= Rowing at the 2024 Summer Olympics – Qualification =

502 athletes qualified for rowing at the 2024 Summer Olympics. About two-thirds of the total quota was awarded to the National Olympic Committees (NOCs), not to specific athletes, at the 2023 World Rowing Championships on 3 to 10 September in Belgrade, Serbia. The remainder of the total quota was attributed to the eligible rowers at each of the four continental qualification regattas in Asia and Oceania, the Americas, Africa, and Europe, and at the final Olympic qualification regatta in Lucerne, Switzerland.

All qualifying NOCs are limited to one berth per event, and only NOCs with fewer than two berths from the World Championships may compete in the continental qualifying regattas. The host nation France would have been automatically granted a berth each in the men's and women's single sculls if it had failed to qualify for any rowing event at the various regattas. Four quota places (two per gender) are entitled to the NOCs competing in the single sculls as bestowed upon the Universality principle.

== Timeline ==
Event	Date	Venue
2023 World Rowing Championships	3–10 September 2023	(Serbia) Belgrade
African Continental Qualification Regatta	23–25 October 2023	(Tunisia) Tunis
Americas Continental Qualification Regatta	14–17 March 2024	(Brazil) Rio de Janeiro
Asian & Oceania Continental Qualification Regatta	19–21 April 2024	(South Korea) Chungju
European Continental Qualification Regatta	25–28 April 2024	(Hungary) Szeged
Final Olympic Qualification Regatta	19–21 May 2024	(Switzerland) Lucerne

== Qualification summary ==
Nation	Men							Women							Crews	Athletes
Nation	M1x	2–	2x	L2x	4–	4x	8+	1x	2–	2x	L2x	4–	4x	8+	Crews	Athletes
Algeria	Yes							Yes							2	2
Angola	Yes														1	1
Argentina				Yes							Yes				2	4
Australia		Yes			Yes		Yes	Yes	Yes	Yes		Yes	Yes	Yes	9	37
Austria								Yes			Yes				2	3
Azerbaijan								Yes							1	1
Belgium	Yes			Yes											2	3
Bermuda	Yes														1	1
Brazil	Yes							Yes							2	2
Bulgaria	Yes							Yes							2	2
Canada											Yes			Yes	2	11
Chile				Yes					Yes						2	4
China			Yes							Yes	Yes	Yes	Yes		5	14
Croatia	Yes	Yes	Yes												3	5
Cuba	Yes							Yes							2	2
Czech Republic				Yes					Yes	Yes					3	6
Denmark	Yes								Yes			Yes		Yes	4	16
Egypt	Yes			Yes											2	3
Estonia						Yes									1	4
France			Yes	Yes	Yes					Yes	Yes				5	12
Germany	Yes	Yes	Yes			Yes	Yes	Yes					Yes		7	23
Great Britain		Yes			Yes	Yes	Yes		Yes	Yes	Yes	Yes	Yes	Yes	10	42
Greece	Yes			Yes					Yes		Yes				4	7
Hong Kong	Yes														1	1
Hungary	Yes														1	1
India	Yes														1	1
Individual Neutral Athletes	Yes							Yes							2	2
Indonesia	Yes														1	1
Iran								Yes			Yes				2	3
Ireland		Yes	Yes	Yes					Yes	Yes	Yes	Yes			7	16
Italy		Yes	Yes	Yes	Yes	Yes	Yes			Yes				Yes	8	34
Japan	Yes			Yes							Yes				3	5
Kazakhstan	Yes														1	1
Kuwait								Yes							1	1
Libya	Yes														1	1
Lithuania	Yes	Yes						Yes	Yes	Yes					5	8
Mexico				Yes				Yes							2	3
Monaco	Yes														1	1
Morocco								Yes							1	1
Netherlands	Yes		Yes		Yes	Yes	Yes	Yes	Yes	Yes		Yes	Yes		10	33
New Zealand	Yes	Yes	Yes		Yes			Yes	Yes	Yes	Yes	Yes			9	20
Nicaragua								Yes							1	1
Norway			Yes	Yes		Yes				Yes					4	10
Paraguay	Yes							Yes							2	2
Peru								Yes			Yes				2	3
Philippines								Yes							1	1
Poland						Yes					Yes				2	6
Romania	Yes	Yes	Yes		Yes	Yes	Yes		Yes	Yes	Yes	Yes	Yes	Yes	12	45
Serbia	Yes		Yes					Yes							3	4
Singapore								Yes							1	1
Slovenia								Yes							1	1
South Africa		Yes						Yes							2	3
Spain		Yes	Yes	Yes				Yes	Yes						5	9
Switzerland		Yes		Yes	Yes	Yes		Yes					Yes		6	17
Thailand	Yes														1	1
Togo								Yes							1	1
Tunisia	Yes										Yes				2	3
Turkey								Yes							1	1
Uganda								Yes							1	1
Ukraine				Yes									Yes		2	6
Uruguay	Yes														1	1
United States	Yes	Yes	Yes		Yes		Yes	Yes	Yes	Yes	Yes	Yes	Yes	Yes	12	42
Uzbekistan				Yes				Yes							2	3
Vietnam								Yes							1	1
Zimbabwe	Yes														1	1
Total: 64 NOCs	32	13	13	16	9	9	7	32	13	13	16	9	9	7	198	502

== Men's events ==
=== Men's single sculls ===
Event	#	Nation	Qualifying rower (Note: For those qualifying from the World Rowing Championships, the NOC may enter a boat at the Olympics with different athletes than those who qualified. For all other qualification regattas, the NOC must enter the athletes who qualified in those events.)
2023 World Rowing Championships	1	Germany	Oliver Zeidler
2023 World Rowing Championships	2	Netherlands	Simon van Dorp
2023 World Rowing Championships	3	New Zealand	Tom Mackintosh
2023 World Rowing Championships	4	Greece	Stefanos Ntouskos
2023 World Rowing Championships	5	Denmark	Sverri Nielsen
2023 World Rowing Championships	6	Croatia	Damir Martin
2023 World Rowing Championships	7	Japan	Ryuta Arakawa
2023 World Rowing Championships	8	Lithuania	Giedrius Bieliauskas
2023 World Rowing Championships	9	Individual Neutral Athletes	Yauheni Zalaty
African Qualification Regatta	1	Egypt	Abdelkhalek El-Banna
African Qualification Regatta	2	Tunisia	Mohamed Taieb
African Qualification Regatta	3	Algeria	Sid Ali Boudina
African Qualification Regatta	4	Zimbabwe	Stephen Cox
African Qualification Regatta	5	Angola	André Matias
Americas Qualification Regatta	1	Brazil	Lucas Verthein
Americas Qualification Regatta	2	Uruguay	Bruno Cetraro
Americas Qualification Regatta	3	Paraguay	Javier Insfrán
Americas Qualification Regatta	4	Bermuda	Dara Alizadeh
Americas Qualification Regatta	5	Cuba	Reidy Cardona Blanco
Asian & Oceania Qualification Regatta	1	Kazakhstan	Vladislav Yakovlev
Asian & Oceania Qualification Regatta	2	Indonesia	Memo
Asian & Oceania Qualification Regatta	3	India	Balraj Panwar
Asian & Oceania Qualification Regatta	4	Hong Kong	Chiu Hin Chun
Asian & Oceania Qualification Regatta	5	Thailand	Premanut Wattananusith
European Qualification Regatta		~~Serbia~~	~~Nikolaj Pimenov~~ (Note: Won the single sculls at the European Qualification Regatta, but declined the Olympic slot after also qualifying in the double sculls at the Final Olympic Qualifyication Regatta.)
European Qualification Regatta	1	Bulgaria	Kristian Vasilev
European Qualification Regatta	2	Belgium	Tim Brys
European Qualification Regatta	3	Slovenia	Isak Žvegelj
Final Qualification Regatta	1	Romania	Mihai Chiruță
Final Qualification Regatta	2	United States	Jacob Plihal
Universality Places	1	Monaco	Quentin Antognelli
Universality Places	2	Libya	Mohamed Bukrah
Total	32		

=== Men's double sculls ===
Event	#	Nation	Qualifying rowers
2023 World Rowing Championships	1	Netherlands	Stef Broenink; Melvin Twellaar
2023 World Rowing Championships	2	Croatia	Martin Sinković; Valent Sinković
2023 World Rowing Championships	3	Ireland	Daire Lynch; Phillip Doyle
2023 World Rowing Championships	4	Italy	Luca Rambaldi; Matteo Sartori
2023 World Rowing Championships	5	Spain	Aleix García; Rodrigo Conde Romero
2023 World Rowing Championships	6	China	Liu Zhiyu; Sulitan Adilijiang
2023 World Rowing Championships	7	Romania	Andrei-Sebastian Cornea; Marian Enache
2023 World Rowing Championships	8	Germany	Jonas Gelsen; Marc Weber
2023 World Rowing Championships	9	Norway	Martin Helseth; Kjetil Borch
2023 World Rowing Championships	10	France	Matthieu Androdias; Hugo Boucheron
2023 World Rowing Championships	11	New Zealand	Robbie Manson; Jordan Parry
Final Qualification Regatta	1	United States	Benjamin Davison; Sorin Koszyk
Final Qualification Regatta	2	Serbia	Martin Mačković; Nikolaj Pimenov
Total	13		

=== Men's lightweight double sculls ===
Event	#	Nation	Qualifying rowers
2023 World Rowing Championships	1	Ireland	Fintan McCarthy; Paul O'Donovan
2023 World Rowing Championships	2	Switzerland	Raphaël Ahumada; Jan Schäuble
2023 World Rowing Championships	3	Italy	Stefano Oppo; Gabriel Soares
2023 World Rowing Championships	4	Czech Republic	Jiří Šimánek; Miroslav Vraštil Jr.
2023 World Rowing Championships	5	Spain	Dennis Carracedo Ferrero; Caetano Horta
2023 World Rowing Championships	6	Norway	Lars Benske; Ask Tjøm
2023 World Rowing Championships	7	Mexico	Miguel Carballo; Alexis López
African Qualification Regatta	1	Egypt	Ahmed Abdelaal; Mohamed Kota
Americas Qualification Regatta	1	Chile	Eber Sanhueza; César Abaroa
Americas Qualification Regatta	2	Argentina	Alejandro Colomino; Pedro Dickson
Asian & Oceania Qualification Regatta	1	Japan	Naoki Furuta; Masayuki Miyaura
Asian & Oceania Qualification Regatta	2	Uzbekistan	Shakhzod Nurmatov; Sobirjon Safaroliev
European Qualification Regatta	1	Ukraine	Igor Khmara; Stanislav Kovalov
European Qualification Regatta	2	Belgium	Niels Van Zandweghe; Tibo Vyvey
Final Qualification Regatta	1	France	Hugo Beurey; Ferdinand Ludwig
Final Qualification Regatta	2	Greece	Petros Gkaidatzis; Antonios Papakonstantinou
Total	16		

=== Men's quadruple sculls ===
Event	#	Nation	Qualifying rowers
2023 World Rowing Championships	1	Netherlands	Finn Florijn; Koen Metsemakers; Lennart van Lierop; Tone Wieten
2023 World Rowing Championships	2	Italy	Nicolò Carucci; Luca Chiumento; Giacomo Gentili; Andrea Panizza
2023 World Rowing Championships	3	Poland	Fabian Baranski; Mateusz Biskup; Dominik Czaja; Miroslaw Zietarski
2023 World Rowing Championships	4	Great Britain	Tom Barras; Callum Dixon; Matt Haywood; Graeme Thomas
2023 World Rowing Championships	5	Germany	Max Appel; Tim Ole Naske; Julius Rommelmann; Moritz Wolff
2023 World Rowing Championships	6	Switzerland	Dominic Condrau; Jan Jonah Plock; Scott Bärlocher; Maurin Lange
2023 World Rowing Championships	7	Romania	Florin Horodișteanu; Marius-Gabriel Lungu; Iliuta-Leontin Nuțescu; Ioan Prundeanu
Final Qualification Regatta	1	Norway	Kristoffer Brun; Jan Oscar Stabe Helvig; Jonas Juel; Erik Andre Solbakken
Final Qualification Regatta	2	Estonia	Tõnu Endrekson; Mikhail Kushteyn; Johann Poolak; Allar Raja
Total	9		

=== Men's coxless pair ===
Event	#	Nation	Qualifying rowers
2023 World Rowing Championships	1	Switzerland	Andrin Gulich; Roman Röösli
2023 World Rowing Championships	2	Great Britain	Tom George; Oliver Wynne-Griffith
2023 World Rowing Championships	3	Ireland	Ross Corrigan; Nathan Timoney
2023 World Rowing Championships	4	Romania	Florin Arteni; Nicu-Iulian Chelaru
2023 World Rowing Championships	5	United States	William Bender; Oliver Bub
2023 World Rowing Championships	6	South Africa	John Smith; Christopher Baxter
2023 World Rowing Championships	7	Spain	Jaime Canalejo; Javier García
2023 World Rowing Championships	8	Australia	Patrick Holt; Simon Keenan
2023 World Rowing Championships	9	New Zealand	Dan Williamson; Phillip Wilson
2023 World Rowing Championships	10	Italy	Giovanni Codato; Davide Comini
2023 World Rowing Championships	11	Croatia	Anton Lončarić; Patrik Lončarić
Final Qualification Regatta	1	Germany	Julius Christ; Sönke Kruse
Final Qualification Regatta	2	Lithuania	Domantas Stankūnas; Dovydas Stankūnas
Total	13		

=== Men's coxless four ===
Event	#	Nation	Qualifying rowers
2023 World Rowing Championships	1	Great Britain	Matt Aldridge; David Ambler; Freddie Davidson; Oliver Wilkes
2023 World Rowing Championships	2	United States	Justin Best; Liam Corrigan; Michael Grady; Nick Mead
2023 World Rowing Championships	3	New Zealand	Matt Macdonald; Oliver Maclean; Tom Murray; Logan Ullrich
2023 World Rowing Championships	4	Netherlands	Eli Brouwer; Guus Mollee; Nelson Ritsema; Rik Rienks
2023 World Rowing Championships	5	Australia	Fergus Hamilton; Alexander Hill; Timothy Masters; James Daniel Robertson
2023 World Rowing Championships	6	France	Benoit Brunet; Teo Rayet; Guillaume Turlan; Thibaud Turlan
2023 World Rowing Championships	7	Romania	Bogdan-Sabin Baitoc; Alexandru-Laurențiu Danciu; Andrei Mândrilă; Ciprian Tudosă
Final Qualification Regatta	1	Italy	Giovanni Abagnale; Nicholas Kohl; Matteo Lodo; Giuseppe Vicino
Final Qualification Regatta	2	Switzerland	Patrick Brunner; Tim Roth; Kai Schätzle; Joel Schürch
Total	9		

=== Men's eight ===
Event	#	Nation	Qualifying rowers
2023 World Rowing Championships	1	Great Britain	Morgan Bolding; Sholto Carnegie; Jacob Dawson; Thomas Digby; Charles Elwes; Thomas Ford; Rory Gibbs; James Rudkin; Harry Brightmore (cox)
2023 World Rowing Championships	2	Netherlands	Sander de Graaf; Ruben Knab; Mick Makker; Olav Molenaar; Ralf Rienks; Gertjan van Doorn; Jacob van de Kerkhof; Jan van der Bij; Dieuwke Fetter (cox)
2023 World Rowing Championships	3	Australia	Ben Canham; Angus Dawson; Jack Hargreaves; Joshua Hicks; Joseph O'Brien; Alexander Purnell; Spencer Turrin; Angus Widdicombe; Kendall Brodie (cox)
2023 World Rowing Championships	4	Romania	Constantin Adam; Sergiu Bejan; Ștefan Berariu; Marius Cozmiuc; Florin Lehaci; Claudiu Neamțu; Mugurel Semciuc; Mihăiță Țigănescu; Adrian Munteanu (cox)
2023 World Rowing Championships	5	Germany	Frederik Breuer; Benedict Eggeling; Laurits Follert; Torben Johannesen; Max John; Olaf Roggensack; Mattes Schönherr; Wolf Niclas Schroeder; Jonas Wiesen (cox)
Final Qualification Regatta	1	United States	Christopher Carlson; Peter Chatain; Clark Dean; Henry Hollingsworth; Evan Olson; Pieter Quinton; Nicholas Rusher; Christian Tabash; Rielly Milne (cox)
Final Qualification Regatta	2	Italy	Vincenzo Abbagnale; Matteo Della Valle; Gennaro Di Mauro; Jacopo Frigerio; Emanuele Gaetani Liseo; Salvatore Monfrecola; Leonardo Pietra Caprina; Davide Verita; Alessandra Faella (cox)
Total	7		

== Women's events ==
=== Women's single sculls ===
Event	#	Nation	Qualifying rower
2023 World Rowing Championships	1	Netherlands	Karolien Florijn
2023 World Rowing Championships	2	New Zealand	Emma Twigg
2023 World Rowing Championships	3	Australia	Tara Rigney
2023 World Rowing Championships	4	United States	Kara Kohler
2023 World Rowing Championships	5	Bulgaria	Desislava Angelova
2023 World Rowing Championships	6	Lithuania	Viktorija Senkutė
2023 World Rowing Championships	7	Austria	Magdalena Lobnig
2023 World Rowing Championships	8	Germany	Alexandra Föster
2023 World Rowing Championships	9	Serbia	Jovana Arsić
African Qualification Regatta	1	Algeria	Nihed Benchadli
African Qualification Regatta	2	South Africa	Courtney Westley
African Qualification Regatta	3	Uganda	Kathleen Noble
African Qualification Regatta	4	Togo	Akoko Komlanvi
African Qualification Regatta	5	Morocco	Majdouline El Allaoui
Americas Qualification Regatta	1	Brazil	Beatriz Tavares
Americas Qualification Regatta	2	Mexico	Kenia Lechuga
Americas Qualification Regatta	3	Paraguay	Alejandra Alonso
Americas Qualification Regatta	4	Peru	Adriana Sanguineti
Americas Qualification Regatta	5	Cuba	Yariulvis Cobas
Asian & Oceania Qualification Regatta	1	Uzbekistan	Hanna Prakatsen
Asian & Oceania Qualification Regatta	2	Iran	Fatemeh Mojallal
Asian & Oceania Qualification Regatta	3	Philippines	Joanie Delgaco
Asian & Oceania Qualification Regatta	4	Vietnam	Phạm Thị Huệ
Asian & Oceania Qualification Regatta	5	Singapore	Saiyidah Aisyah
European Qualification Regatta	1	Individual Neutral Athletes	Tatsiana Klimovich
European Qualification Regatta	2	Azerbaijan	Diana Dymchenko
European Qualification Regatta	—	~~Ukraine~~	~~Yevheniia Dovhodko~~ (Note: Ukraine declined to enter Yevheniia Dovhodko in the single. She will be rowing in the quadrupel sculls in place of Nataliia Dovhodko, who has health problems.)
European Qualification Regatta	3	Slovenia	Nina Kostanjšek
Final Qualification Regatta	1	Spain	Virginia Diaz Rivas
Final Qualification Regatta	2	Switzerland	Aurelia-Maxima Janzen
Universality Places	1	Nicaragua	Evidelia González
Universality Places	2	Kuwait	Suad Al-Faqaan
Total	32		

=== Women's double sculls ===
Event	#	Nation	Qualifying rowers
2023 World Rowing Championships	1	Romania	Ancuța Bodnar; Andrada-Maria Moroșanu
2023 World Rowing Championships	2	Lithuania	Donata Karalienė; Dovilė Rimkutė
2023 World Rowing Championships	3	United States	Kristina Wagner; Sophia Vitas
2023 World Rowing Championships	4	Ireland	Alison Bergin; Zoe Hyde
2023 World Rowing Championships	5	New Zealand	Brooke Francis; Lucy Spoors
2023 World Rowing Championships	6	France	Margaux Bailleul; Emma Lunatti
2023 World Rowing Championships	7	Italy	Stefania Gobbi; Clara Guerra
2023 World Rowing Championships	8	Australia	Amanda Bateman; Harriet Hudson
2023 World Rowing Championships	9	Norway	Thea Helseth; Inger Kavlie
2023 World Rowing Championships	10	China	Shen Shuangmei; Lu Shiyu
2023 World Rowing Championships	11	Netherlands	Lisa Scheenaard; Martine Veldhuis
Final Qualification Regatta	1	Czech Republic	Lenka Luksová; Anna Šantrůčková
Final Qualification Regatta	2	Great Britain	Mathilda Hodgkins-Byrne; Becky Wilde
Total	13		

=== Women's lightweight double sculls ===
Event	#	Nation	Qualifying rowers
2023 World Rowing Championships	1	Great Britain	Emily Craig; Imogen Grant
2023 World Rowing Championships	2	United States	Molly Reckford; Michelle Sechser
2023 World Rowing Championships	3	Romania	Ionela Cozmiuc; Gianina van Groningen
2023 World Rowing Championships	4	Canada	Jennifer Casson; Jill Moffatt
2023 World Rowing Championships	5	New Zealand	Shannon Cox; Jackie Kiddle
2023 World Rowing Championships	6	China	Zou Jiaqi; Qiu Xiuping
2023 World Rowing Championships	7	Ireland	Margaret Cremen; Aoife Casey
African Qualification Regatta	1	Tunisia	Selma Dhaouadi; Khadija Krimi
Americas Qualification Regatta	1	Argentina	Sonia Baluzzo; Evelyn Silvestro
Americas Qualification Regatta	2	Peru	Alessia Palacios; Valeria Palacios
Asian & Oceania Qualification Regatta	1	Japan	Emi Hirouchi; Ayami Oishi
Asian & Oceania Qualification Regatta	2	Iran	Mahsa Javar; Zeinab Norouzi
European Qualification Regatta	1	Poland	Martyna Mikołajczak; Katarzyna Wełna
European Qualification Regatta	2	Austria	Louisa Altenhuber; Lara Tiefenthaler
Final Qualification Regatta	1	France	Claire Bove; Laura Tarantola
Final Qualification Regatta	2	Greece	Zoi Fitsiou; Dimitra Eleni Kontou
Total	16		

=== Women's quadruple sculls ===
Event	#	Nation	Qualifying rowers
2023 World Rowing Championships	1	Great Britain	Lola Anderson; Georgie Brayshaw; Lauren Henry; Hannah Scott
2023 World Rowing Championships	2	Netherlands	Roos de Jong; Tessa Dullemans; Bente Paulis; Laila Youssifou
2023 World Rowing Championships	3	China	Chen Yunxia; Zhang Ling; Lü Yang; Cui Xiaotong
2023 World Rowing Championships	4	Switzerland	Célia Dupré; Lisa Lötscher; Fabienne Schweizer; Pascale Walker
2023 World Rowing Championships	5	Australia	Caitlin Cronin; Laura Gourley; Rowena Meredith; Kathryn Rowan; Ria Thompson
2023 World Rowing Championships	6	Romania	Emanuela-Ioana Ciotău; Patricia Cireș; Oana-Madalina Moroșan; Alexandra Ungureanu
2023 World Rowing Championships	7	Germany	Pia Greiten; Leonie Menzel; Tabea Schendekehl; Maren Völz
Final Qualification Regatta	1	United States	Teal Cohen; Emily Delleman; Grace Joyce; Lauren O'Connor
Final Qualification Regatta	2	Ukraine	Nataliya Dovhodko; Kateryna Dudchenko; Anastasiia Kozhenkova; Daryna Verkhogliad
Total	9		

=== Women's coxless pair ===
Event	#	Nation	Qualifying rowers
2023 World Rowing Championships	1	Netherlands	Ymkje Clevering; Veronique Meester
2023 World Rowing Championships	2	Australia	Annabelle McIntyre; Jessica Morrison
2023 World Rowing Championships	3	Romania	Denisa Tîlvescu; Ioana Vrînceanu
2023 World Rowing Championships	4	Ireland	Aifric Keogh; Fiona Murtagh
2023 World Rowing Championships	5	Chile	Antonia Abraham; Melita Abraham
2023 World Rowing Championships	6	United States	Azja Czajkowski; Jessica Thoennes
2023 World Rowing Championships	7	Greece	Christina Bourmpou; Evangelia Papkonstantinou
2023 World Rowing Championships	8	Spain	Esther Briz; Aina Cid
2023 World Rowing Championships	9	Great Britain	Chloe Brew; Rebecca Edwards
2023 World Rowing Championships	10	Lithuania	Ieva Adomavičiūtė; Kamilė Kralikaitė
2023 World Rowing Championships	11	Czech Republic	Pavlína Flamíková; Radka Novotníková
Final Qualification Regatta	1	Denmark	Hedvig Laerke Rasmussen; Fie Udby Erichsen
Final Qualification Regatta	2	New Zealand	Kate Haines; Alana Sherman
Total	13		

=== Women's coxless four ===
Event	#	Nation	Qualifying rowers
2023 World Rowing Championships	1	Netherlands	Benthe Boonstra; Hermijntje Drenth; Tinka Offereins; Marloes Oldenburg
2023 World Rowing Championships	2	Romania	Iulia-Liliana Balaucă; Larisa Bogdan; Maria Lehaci; Maria-Magdalena Rusu
2023 World Rowing Championships	3	Great Britain	Esme Booth; Helen Glover; Sam Redgrave; Rebecca Shorten
2023 World Rowing Championships	4	United States	Emily Kallfelz; Kaitlin Knifton; Mary Mazzio-Manson; Kelsey Reelick
2023 World Rowing Championships	5	Australia	Olympia Aldersey; Jean Mitchell; Lily Alton-Triggs; Molly Goodman
2023 World Rowing Championships	6	China	Zhang Shuxian; Liu Xiaoxin; Wang Zifeng; Xu Xingye
2023 World Rowing Championships	7	New Zealand	Jackie Gowler; Davina Waddy; Kerri Williams; Phoebe Spoors
Final Qualification Regatta	1	Ireland	Emily Hegarty; Eimear Lambe; Natalie Long; Imogen Magner
Final Qualification Regatta	2	Denmark	Astrid Steensberg; Frida Sanggaard Nielsen; Marie Skytte Hauberg Johannesen; Julie Poulsen
Total	9		

=== Women's eight ===
Event	#	Nation	Qualifying rowers
2023 World Rowing Championships	1	Romania	Adriana Adam; Roxana Anghel; Amalia Bereș; Mădălina Bereș; Iuliana Buhuș; Dumitrița Juncănariu; Iuliana Popa; Simona Radiș; Victoria-Ștefania Petreanu (cox)
2023 World Rowing Championships	2	United States	Charlotte Buck; Molly Bruggeman; Olivia Coffey; Claire Collins; Margaret Hedeman; Meghan Musnicki; Regina Salmons; Madeleine Wanamaker; Nina Castagna (cox)
2023 World Rowing Championships	3	Australia	Katrina Werry; Lucy Stephan; Jacqueline Swick; Georgina Rowe; Sarah Hawe; Giorgia Patten; Bronwyn Cox; Paige Barr; Hayley Verbunt
2023 World Rowing Championships	4	Great Britain	Annie Campbell-Orde; Holly Dunford; Emily Ford; Lauren Irwin; Heidi Long; Rowan McKellar; Eve Stewart; Harriet Taylor; Henry Fieldman (cox)
2023 World Rowing Championships	5	Canada	Abigail Dent; Caileigh Filmer; Kasia Gruchalla-Wesierski; Maya Meschkuleit; Sydney Payne; Jessica Sevick; Kristina Walker; Avalon Wasteneys; Kristen Kit (cox)
Final Qualification Regatta	1	Italy	Veronica Bumbaca; Alice Codato; Linda De Filippis; Alice Gnatta; Elisa Mondelli; Giorgia Pelacchi; Aisha Rocek; Silvia Terrazzi; Emanuele Capponi (cox)
Final Qualification Regatta	2	Denmark	Frida Werner Foldager; Clara Hornnaess; Sara Johansen; Nikoline Laidlaw; Karen Mortensen; Caroline Munch; Nanna Vigild; Sofie Vikkelsoee; Sophie Østergaard (cox)
Total	7		
