= 2023 World Rowing Championships – Men's eight =

Men's eight at the 2023 World Rowing Championships
- Venue: Lake Sava
- Location: Belgrade, Serbia
- Dates: 5 September – 9 September
- Competitors: 90 from 10 nations
- Winning time: 5:24.20

Medalists
| gold medal | Jacob Dawson; Morgan Bolding; Rory Gibbs; Sholto Carnegie; Charles Elwes; Thomas Digby; James Rudkin; Thomas Ford; Harry Brightmore | Great Britain |
| silver medal | Guus Mollee; Olav Molenaar; Jan van Der Bij; Guillaume Krommenhoek; Sander de Graaf; Jacob van De Kerkhof; Gert-Jan van Doorn; Mick Makker; Dieuwke Fetter | Netherlands |
| bronze medal | Patrick Holt; Joshua Hicks; Benjamin Canham; Timothy Masters; James Daniel Robertson; Joseph O'Brien; Angus Dawson; Angus Widdicombe; Kendall Brodie | Australia |

The men's eight competition at the 2023 World Rowing Championships took place at Lake Sava, in Belgrade.

== Schedule ==
The schedule was as follows:

| Date | Time | Round |
|---|---|---|
| Tuesday 5 September 2023 | 13:25 | Heats |
| Friday 8 September 2023 | 11:15 | Repechages |
| Saturday 9 September 2023 | 11:44 | Final B |
| Saturday 9 September 2023 | 14:59 | Final A |

All times are Central European Summer Time (UTC+2)

== Results ==
=== Heats ===
The fastest two boats in each heat advanced directly to the A final. The remaining boats were sent to the repechage.

==== Heat 1 ====
| Rank | Rower | Country | Time | Notes |
|---|---|---|---|---|
| 1 | Dawson, Bolding, Gibbs, Carnegie, Elwes, Digby, Rudkin, Ford, Brightmore | Great Britain | 5:34.35 | FA |
| 2 | Mollee, Molenaar, Van Der Bij, Krommenhoek, De Graaf, Van De Kerkhof, Van Doorn, Makker, Fetter | Netherlands | 5:36.61 | FA |
| 3 | Keane, Bailey, Buczek, Ames, Clegg, Cullen, Stone, Crothers, Court | Canada | 5:38.26 | R |
| 4 | Lindorfer, Gillhofer, Chernikov, Bachmair, Haider, Stadler, Karlovsky, Stekl, Pellegrini | Austria | 5:52.90 | R |
| 5 | Cai Jingying, Lyu Yu, Ji Gaoxing, Zhang Songhu, Cui Binghui, Su Minghua, Ni Xulin, Nie Yide, Liang Weixiong | China | 7:44.56 | R |

==== Heat 2 ====
| Rank | Rower | Country | Time | Notes |
|---|---|---|---|---|
| 1 | Holt, Hicks, Canham, Masters, Robertson, O'Brien, Dawson, Widdicombe, Brodie | Australia | 5:37.85 | FA |
| 2 | Hollingsworth, Dean, Bub, Chatain, Carlson, Hedge, Carlson, Quinton, Catalano | United States | 5:40.41 | FA |
| 3 | Eggeling, Angl, John, Johannesen, Roggensack, Kammann, Schröder, Schönherr, Wiesen | Germany | 5:46.18 | R |
| 4 | Della Valle, Gaetani Liseo, Monfrecola, Abagnale, Di Mauro, Venier, Abbagnale, Pietra Caprina, Faella | Italy | 5:47.22 | R |
| 5 | Tiganescu, Danciu, Baitoc, Semciuc, Cozmiuc, Bejan, Berariu, Lehaci, Munteanu | Romania | 6:08.86 | R |

=== Repechage ===
The fastest two boats advanced to the A final. The remaining boats were sent to the B final.

| Rank | Rower | Country | Time | Notes |
|---|---|---|---|---|
| 1 | Tiganescu, Danciu, Baitoc, Semciuc, Cozmiuc, Bejan, Berariu, Lehaci, Munteanu | Romania | 5:40.36 | FA |
| 2 | Eggeling, Angl, John, Johannesen, Roggensack, Kammann, Schröder, Schönherr, Wiesen | Germany | 5:40.96 | FA |
| 3 | Keane, Bailey, Buczek, Ames, Clegg, Cullen, Stone, Crothers, Court | Canada | 5:42.28 | FB |
| 4 | Della Valle, Gaetani Liseo, Monfrecola, Abagnale, Di Mauro, Venier, Abbagnale, Pietra Caprina, Faella | Italy | 5:47.13 | FB |
| 5 | Chernikov, Gillhofer, Lindorfer, Bachmair, Haider, Stadler, Karlovsky, Stekl, Pellegrini | Austria | 5:54.21 | FB |
| 6 | Cai Jingying, Lyu Yu, Ji Gaoxing, Zhang Songhu, Cui Binghui, Su Minghua, Ni Xulin, Nie Yide, Liang Weixiong | China | 5:55.53 | FB |

=== Finals ===
The A final determined the rankings for places 1 to 6. Additional rankings were determined in the other finals.

==== Final B ====
| Rank | Rower | Country | Time | Total rank |
|---|---|---|---|---|
| 1 | Della Valle, Gaetani Liseo, Monfrecola, Abagnale, Di Mauro, Venier, Abbagnale, Pietra Caprina, Faella | Italy | 5:32.24 | 7 |
| 2 | Keane, Bailey, Buczek, Ames, Clegg, Cullen, Stone, Crothers, Court | Canada | 5:34.10 | 8 |
| 3 | Cai Jingying, Lyu Yu, Ji Gaoxing, Zhang Songhu, Cui Binghui, Su Minghua, Ni Xulin, Nie Yide, Liang Weixiong | China | 5:37.92 | 9 |
| 4 | Chernikov, Steininger, Lindorfer, Bachmair, Haider, Stadler, Karlovsky, Stekl, Pellegrini | Austria | 5:39.27 | 10 |

==== Final A ====
| Rank | Rower | Country | Time |
|---|---|---|---|
| 1 | Dawson, Bolding, Gibbs, Carnegie, Elwes, Digby, Rudkin, Ford, Brightmore | Great Britain | 5:24.20 |
| 2 | Mollee, Molenaar, Van Der Bij, Krommenhoek, De Graaf, Van De Kerkhof, Van Doorn, Makker, Fetter | Netherlands | 5:25.23 |
| 3 | Holt, Hicks, Canham, Masters, Robertson, O'Brien, Dawson, Widdicombe, Brodie | Australia | 5:26.65 |
| 4 | Tiganescu, Danciu, Baitoc, Semciuc, Cozmiuc, Bejan, Berariu, Lehaci, Munteanu | Romania | 5:27.57 |
| 5 | Eggeling, Angl, John, Johannesen, Roggensack, Kammann, Schröder, Schönherr, Wiesen | Germany | 5:28.39 |
| 6 | Hollingsworth, Dean, Bub, Chatain, Carlson, Hedge, Carlson, Quinton, Catalano | United States | 5:29.18 |
