= Rowing at the 2024 Summer Olympics – Men's eight =

Men's eight at the Games of the XXXIII Olympiad
- Olympic rowing
- Venue: Stade nautique de Vaires-sur-Marne
- Dates: 29 July – 3 August 2024
- Competitors: 63 from 7 nations

Medalists
1st place, gold medalist(s)		Sholto Carnegie; Rory Gibbs; Morgan Bolding; Jacob Dawson; Charlie Elwes; Thomas Digby; James Rudkin; Thomas Ford; Harry Brightmore (cox)	Great Britain
2nd place, silver medalist(s)		Ralf Rienks; Olav Molenaar; Sander de Graaf; Ruben Knab; Gert-Jan van Doorn; Jacob van de Kerkhof; Jan van der Bij; Mick Makker; Dieuwke Fetter (cox)	Netherlands
3rd place, bronze medalist(s)		Henry Hollingsworth; Nicholas Rusher; Christian Tabash; Clark Dean; Christopher Carlson; Peter Chatain; Evan Olson; Pieter Quinton; Rielly Milne (cox)	United States

The men's eight event at the 2024 Summer Olympics took place from 29 July to 3 August 2024 at the Stade nautique de Vaires-sur-Marne.

== Background ==
This was the 29th appearance of the event, which was not held at the first Games in 1896 (when bad weather forced the cancellation of all rowing events) but has been held at every Summer Olympics since 1900.

New Zealand won the event at the 2020 Olympics. Great Britain won the 2023 and 2022 World Championships, having earned a bronze medal at the 2020 Olympics. At the 2024 World Rowing Cup II in May, Great Britain won by less than a second to the United States. These two nations did not compete in the World Rowing Cup III in June, the last major international regatta before the Olympics.

== Qualification ==
Each National Olympic Committee (NOC) has been limited to a single boat in the event since 1920. There are 7 qualifying places in the men's eight:

- 5 from the World Championships (Great Britain, Netherlands, Australia, Romania, and Germany)
- 2 from the final qualification regatta (United States and Italy)

== Competition format ==
This rowing event features nine-person boats, with eight rowers and a coxswain. It is a sweep rowing event, with the rowers each having one oar (and thus each rowing on one side). The competition consists of multiple rounds. The course uses the 2000 metres distance that became the Olympic standard in 1912.

Beginning at the 2020 Olympics, the coxswain position has been open to any gender.

There are two heats, with the winner of each advancing directly to the final and the remaining five boats competing in the repechage. The top four in the repechage advance to the final; only the last-place boat will be eliminated (with an overall rank of 7th place). The final determines the medals as well as 4th to 6th places.

== Schedule ==
The competition is scheduled over six days. Times given are session start times; multiple rowing events might have races during a session.

All times are Central European Time (UTC+9)

Date	Time	Round
Monday, 29 July 2024	11:40	Heats
Thursday, 1 August 2024	10:20	Repechage
Saturday, 3 August 2024	11:10	Final

== Results ==
=== Heats ===
The winners of each heat qualified for the final, while the remainder went to the repechage.

==== Heat 1 ====
Rank	Lane	Rower	Nation	Time	Notes
1	4	Hollingsworth; Rusher; Tabash; Dean; Carlson; Chatain; Olson; Quinton; Milne (c)	United States	5:29.94	Q
2	1	Rienks; Molenaar; de Graaf; Knab; van Doorn; van de Kerkhof; van der Bij; Makker; Fetter (c)	Netherlands	5:31.82	R
3	2	Eggeling; Johannesen; Roggensack; Follert; John; Breuer; Schroeder; Schönherr; Wiesen (c)	Germany	5:41.63	R
4	3	Țigănescu; Daniciu; Baitoc; Adam; Cozmiuc; Semciuc; Arteni; Lehaci; Munteanu (c)	Romania	5:55.82	R

==== Heat 2 ====
Rank	Lane	Rower	Nation	Time	Notes
1	1	Carnegie; Gibbs; Bolding; Dawson; Elwes; Digby; Rudkin; Ford; Brightmore (c)	Great Britain	5:37.04	Q
2	3	Canham; Hicks; Turrin; Widdicombe; Hargreaves; Purnell; Dawson; O'Brien; Brodie (c)	Australia	5:42.07	R
3	2	Valle; Frigerio; Liseo; Monfrecola; Verita; Mauro; Caprina; Abbagnale; Faella (c)	Italy	5:52.52	R

=== Repechage ===
Rank	Lane	Rower	Nation	Time	Notes
1	3	Rienks; Molenaar; de Graaf; Knab; van Doorn; van de Kerkhof; van der Bij; Makker; Fetter (c)	Netherlands	5:27.58	Q
2	4	Eggeling; Johannesen; Roggensack; Follert; John; Breuer; Schroeder; Schönherr; Wiesen (c)	Germany	5:29.17	Q
3	5	Țigănescu; Daniciu; Baitoc; Adam; Cozmiuc; Semciuc; Arteni; Lehaci; Munteanu (c)	Romania	5:30.00	Q
4	2	Canham; Hicks; Turrin; Widdicombe; Hargreaves; Purnell; Dawson; O'Brien; Brodie (c)	Australia	5:31.50	Q
5	1	Valle; Frigerio; Liseo; Monfrecola; Verita; Mauro; Caprina; Abbagnale; Faella (c)	Italy	5:36.31	

=== Final ===
Rank	Lane	Rower	Nation	Time	Notes
1st place, gold medalist(s)	4	Carnegie; Gibbs; Bolding; Dawson; Elwes; Digby; Rudkin; Ford; Brightmore (c)	Great Britain	5:22.88	
2nd place, silver medalist(s)	2	Rienks; Molenaar; de Graaf; Knab; van Doorn; van de Kerkhof; van der Bij; Makker; Fetter (c)	Netherlands	5:23.92	
3rd place, bronze medalist(s)	3	Hollingsworth; Rusher; Tabash; Dean; Carlson; Chatain; Olson; Quinton; Milne (c)	United States	5:25.28	
4	5	Eggeling; Johannesen; Roggensack; Follert; John; Breuer; Schroeder; Schönherr; Wiesen (c)	Germany	5:29.80	
5	1	Țigănescu; Daniciu; Baitoc; Adam; Cozmiuc; Semciuc; Arteni; Lehaci; Munteanu (c)	Romania	5:30.15	
6	6	Canham; Hicks; Turrin; Widdicombe; Hargreaves; Purnell; Dawson; O'Brien; Brodie (c)	Australia	5:31.79	
