= 2017 European Rowing U23 Championships =

- Venue: Kruszwica Rowing Club
- Location: Kruszwica, Poland
- Dates: 2-3 September
- Nations: 30

The 1st European Rowing U23 Championships was the 1st edition and was held from 2 to 3 September 2017 at the Kruszwica Rowing Club in Kruszwica, Poland.

== Medal summary ==
=== Men's Events ===
Event	Gold		Silver		Bronze	
BLM1x	Jan Cincibuch; Czech Republic	07:44.38	Jakob Zwölfer; Austria	07:46.64	Aleš Jalen; Slovenia	07:48.58
BLM2-	Turkey; Mert Kaan Kartal; Fatih Ünsal	07:26.67	Hungary; Bence Szabó; Ákos Privaczki-Juhász	07:30.99	Germany; Paul Hotz; Janis Seidenfaden	07:32.01
BLM2x	Denmark; Christian Hagemann; Alexander Modest	06:48.68	Slovakia; Adam Štiffel; Peter Zelinka	06:55.70	Russia; Sergey Cherepkov; Rustam Khaibullin	06:57.38
BLM4-	Germany; Simon Berkemeyer; Tobias Ressemann; Julius Wagner; Henning Sproßmann	06:34.93	Ukraine; Dmytro Halian; Roman Kyrylovskyi; Volodymyr Dziubynskyi; Artem Pshenychnyi	06:40.25	Austria; Lukas Kreitmeier; Vinzent Wiener; Julian Kiralyhidi; Umberto Bertagnoli	06:45.96
BLM4x	Poland; Jakub Dominiczak; Dawid Pieniak; Marcin Sobieraj; Mateusz Świętek	06:09.27	Belarus; Kiryl Tsikhanovich; Artsem Laputsin; Yauheni Zalaty; Uladzimir Kulik	06:12.57	Hungary; Kornél Kovács; Daniel Dano; Kristof Acs; Mate Bacskai	06:12.73
BM1x	Boris Yotov; Bulgaria	07:28.74	Oliver Zeidler; Germany	07:29.29	Marian Enache; Romania	07:30.89
BM2-	Romania; Mihăiță Țigănescu; Cosmin Pascari	07:01.44	Austria; Maximilian Kohlmayr; Florian Walk	07:09.39	Bulgaria; Rangel Katsarski; Stanimir Haladzhov	07:16.83
BM2x	Greece; Ioannis Kalandaridis; Christos Steryiakas	06:47.96	Serbia; Igor Đerić; Aleksandar Beđik	06:49.99	Slovenia; Nik Krebs; Miha Aljančič	06:55.29
BM4-	Romania; Mugurel Semciuc; Alexandru Chioseaua; Andrei Alexandru Tănasă; Sergiu Bejan	06:20.21	Lithuania; Bieliauskas Giedrius; Povilas Stankūnas; Mantas Juškevičius; Saulius Ilonis	06:24.97	Croatia; Patrik Lončarić; Anton Lončarić; Ivan Ante Grgić; Fabio Ipsa	06:29.33
BM4+	Romania; Florin Lehaci; Bogdan Sabin Băițoc; Ștefan Berariu; Ciprian Huc; Adrian Munteanu (cox)	06:42.06	Ukraine; Artem Derkach; Oleh Kravchenko; Stanislav Kozodoi; Oleksii Tymoshenko; Oleksandr Konovaliuk	06:52.92	Hungary; Márton Szabó; Gergely Bedők; Almos Sonfeld; Gergő Ocsenász; Dániel Csorba	07:09.05
BM4x	Poland; Jakub Dominiczak; Dawid Pieniak; Marcin Sobieraj; Mateusz Świętek	06:09.27	Belarus; Kiryl Tsikhanovich; Artsem Laputsin; Yauheni Zalaty; Uladzimir Kulik	06:12.57	Hungary; Kornél Kovács; Dániel Danó; Kristóf Ács; Maté Bácskai	06:12.73
BM8+	Romania; Cristian Ivascu; George Cătrună; Constantin Radu; Constantin Adam; Alexandru Matincă; Alexandru Macovei; Gheorghe Dedu; Ciprian Tudosă; Adrian Munteanu (cox)	05:56.06	Great Britain; Thomas Strudwick; Graham Ord; George Stewart; Oliver Wilkes; Alexander Haynes; Samuel Nunn; William Stewart; Rufus Biggs; Ian Middleton	05:58.97	France; Alexis Guérinot; Nicolas Gilbert; Hugo Quémener; Quentin Stender; Guillaume Turlan; Thibaud Turlan; Paul Goetghebeur; Louis Droissart; Thibaut Hacot	05:59.28

=== Women's Events ===
Event	Gold		Silver		Bronze	
BLW1x	Maia Lund; Norway	08:41.40	Lara Eichenberger; Switzerland	08:44.93	Lovisa Wallin; Sweden	08:47.81
BLW2x	Romania; Ionela-Livia Lehaci; Gianina-Elena Beleaga	07:43.84	Germany; Janika Kölblin; Stefanie Weigt	07:54.98	Austria; Louisa Altenhuber; Laura Arndorfer	07:59.14
BLW4x	Denmark; Marie-Louise Petersen; Ida Langkjær; Nanna Bo Christensen; Marie Moerch-Pedersen	07:22.41	Germany; Sina Schäfer; Lara Richter; Marie-Christine Gerhardt; Eva-Lotta Nebelsieck	07:23.95	None awarded	
BW1x	Pascale Walker; Switzerland	08:17.74	Desislava Georgieva; Bulgaria	08:30.76	Ekaterina Pitirimova; Russia	08:32.00
BW2-	Romania; Madalina Heghes; Iuliana Buhus	07:57.10	Russia; Ekaterina Kozlenko; Olga Nesterenko	08:04.87	Hungary; Eszter Kremer; Dora Polivka	08:08.25
BW2x	Belarus; Tatsiana Klimovich; Krystina Staraselets	07:34.72	Greece; Maria Kyridou; Dimitra-Sofia Tsamopoulou	07:39.22	Switzerland; Debora Hofer; Fabienne Schweizer	07:41.77
BW4-	Romania; Cristina-Georgiana Popescu; Alina Ligia Pop; Beatrice-Madalina Parfenie; Roxana Parascanu	07:14.25	Croatia; Ivana Jurkovic; Josipa Jurkovic; Bruna Milinovic; Izabela Krakic	07:23.86	Denmark; Trine Dahl Pedersen; Emma Sophie Hammer; Marta Kempf; Frida Sanggaard Nielsen	07:25.89
BW4x	Romania; Georgiana Vasile; Nicoleta-Ancuta Bodnar; Elena Logofatu; Nicoleta Pascanu	06:54.16	Poland; Joanna Sliwinska; Katarzyna Boruch; Monika Sobieszek; Agnieszka Robaszkiewicz	07:04.28	Germany; Sina Schäfer; Lara Richter; Marie-Christine Gerhardt; Eva-Lotta Nebelsieck	07:11.80
BW8+	Russia; Kira Yuvchenko; Elizaveta Kornienko; Ekaterina Sevostianova; Maria Kubyshkina; Olga Zaruba; Anna Karpova; Anna Aksenova; Valentina Plaksina; Elizaveta Krylova	06:45.58	Romania; Andrea-Ioana Budeanu; Simona Geanina Radis; Maria-Magdalena Rusu; Amalia Beres; Madalina-Gabriela Casu; Vasilica-Alexandra Rusu; Adriana Ailincai; Maria Tivodariu; Victoria-Stefania Petreanu	06:46.44	Great Britain; Grace Macdonald; Isobel Powell; Lauren Irwin; Chloe Brew; Fiona Bell; Oonagh Cousins; Margaret Saunders; Sophia Heath; Aisling Humphries-Griffiths	06:49.16

== Medal table ==
Rank	Nation	Gold	Silver	Bronze	Total
1	Romania (ROU)	8	1	1	10
2	Poland (POL)	2	1	0	3
3	Denmark (DEN)	2	0	1	3
4	Germany (GER)	1	3	2	6
5	Belarus (BLR)	1	2	0	3
6	Russia (RUS)	1	1	2	4
7	Bulgaria (BUL)	1	1	1	3
7	Switzerland (SUI)	1	1	1	3
9	Greece (GRE)	1	1	0	2
10	Czech Republic (CZE)	1	0	0	1
10	Norway (NOR)	1	0	0	1
10	Turkey (TUR)	1	0	0	1
13	Austria (AUT)	0	2	2	4
14	Ukraine (UKR)	0	2	0	2
15	Hungary (HUN)	0	1	4	5
16	Croatia (CRO)	0	1	1	2
16	Great Britain (GBR)	0	1	1	2
18	Lithuania (LTU)	0	1	0	1
18	Serbia (SRB)	0	1	0	1
18	Slovakia (SVK)	0	1	0	1
21	Slovenia (SLO)	0	0	2	2
22	France (FRA)	0	0	1	1
22	Sweden (SWE)	0	0	1	1
Totals (23 entries)		21	21	20	62

== See also ==
- 2017 European Rowing Championships
- 2017 European Rowing Junior Championships
