= 2018 European Rowing U23 Championships =

- Venue: Brest Rowing Course
- Location: Brest, Belarus
- Dates: 1–2 September
- Competitors: 443 from 25 nations

The 2nd European Rowing U23 Championships was the 2nd edition and was held from 1 to 2 September 2018 at the Brest Rowing Course in Brest, Belarus.

== Medal summary ==
=== Men's events ===
Event	Gold		Silver		Bronze	
BLM1x	Simon Klüter; Germany	6:58.02	Rainer Kepplinger; Austria	6:59.36	Gavin Horsburgh; United Kingdom	7:02.49
BLM2-	Greece; Antonios Papakonstantinou; Ioannis Marokos	6:36.30	Belarus; Dzmitry Mazheryn; Andrei Fedarenka	6:44.39	Hungary; Bence Szabó; Bence Szlovák	6:51.99
BLM2x	Greece; Petros Gkaidatzis; Ninos Nikolaidis	6:18.44	Switzerland; Samuel Breckenridge; Jan Schäuble	6:23.17	Austria; Alexander Maderner; Johannes Hafergut	6:23.67
BLM4x	Germany; Tim Bier; Malte Koch; Philipp Thein; Malte Rietdorf	5:55.52	Czech Republic; Ondřej Čermák; Jan Šmolík; Luboš Zapletal; Jonáš Friedrich	5:57.92	Austria; Lukas Kreitmeier; Umberto Bertagnoli; Levi Weber; Sebastian Kabas	6:00.73
BM1x	Mihai Chiruță; Romania	6:51.29	Giedrius Bieliauskas; Lithuania	6:51.79	Andrey Potapkin; Russia	6:55.33
BM2-	Romania; Dumitru Ciobică; Florin Lehaci	6:29.49	Poland; Bartosz Modrzyński; Lukasz Posylajka	6:30.93	Greece; Ioannis Kalandaridis; Spyridon Kalentzis	6:31.08
BM2x	Greece; Stefanos Douskos; Christos Steryiakas	6:13.52	Poland; Fabian Barański; Mateusz Świętek	6:14.72	Serbia; Igor Đerić; Dušan Slavnić	6:19.14
BM4-	Romania; Mihăiță Țigănescu; Cosmin Pascari; Ștefan Berariu; Ciprian Huc	5:53.95	Hungary; Tamás Dobai; Márton Hopp; Norbert Kiss; Tamás Gerei	6:04.39	Germany; William Strulick; Richard Aurich; Paul Dohrmann; Julius Müller	6:04.90
BM4+	Romania; Alexandru Chioseaua; Mugurel Semciuc; Gheorghe-Robert Dedu; Constantin Cristi Hîrgău; Adrian Munteanu	6:12.87	Russia; Artem Rudnichenko; Daniil Baranov; Ilya Ivanov; Grigoriy Krylov; Evgeniy Terekhov	6:18.71	Ukraine; Bohdan Yurchenko; Kostiantyn Musiienko; Maksym Onipchenko; Roman Skoryi; Denys Dziubynskyi	6:24.27
BM4x	Hungary; Dániel Danó; Márton Szabó; Kristóf Ács; Maté Bácskai	5:48.73	Ukraine; Serhiy Sokhatskyi; Bohdan Martynenko; Yevhen Aleksandrov; Oleksiy Selivanov	5:49.59	Czech Republic; Václav Baldrián; Tomáš Šišma; Radim Hladík; Marek Řehořek	5:51.51
BM8+	Romania; Andrei-Alexandru Tănasă; Marian Cireașă; Alexandru Chioseaua; Nicu-Iulian Chelaru; Bogdan Sabin Băițoc; Mugurel Semciuc; Gheorghe-Robert Dedu; Constantin Cristi Hîrgău; Adrian Munteanu	5:34.31	Belarus; Vitali Dzehtsiarou; Ihar Herus; Aliaksei Tarasevich; Yauheni Maiseyev; Dzianis Akinchyts; Yahor Shedau; Dzianis Shedau; Anton Bahinksi; Danila Haitsiukevich	5:37.38	Ukraine; Serhiy Yevdokymov; Mykola Fedorenko; Artem Derkach; Oleksandr Sydoruk; Stanislav Kozodoi; Oleh Kravchenko; Denys Shkliaruk; Pavlo Yurchenko; Oleksandr Konovaliuk	5:39.31

=== Women's events ===
Event	Gold		Silver		Bronze	
BLW1x	Eline Rol; Switzerland	7:47.22	Kristýna Neuhortová; Czech Republic	7:49.99	Luise Asmussen; Germany	7:50.15
BLW2-	Germany; Maren Weber; Katharina Niel	7:29.27	Russia; Ekaterina Belikova; Alena Novikova	7:35.76	Czech Republic; Tereza Businská; Linda Skálová	7:36.48
BLW2x	Greece; Thomais Emmanouilidou; Eleni Agioti	7:02.42	Switzerland; Soa Meakin; Lara Eichenberger	7:04.99	Germany; Luisa Simon; Sofie Vardakas	7:14.75
BLW4x	Germany; Julia Wolf; Nina Öhlckers; Sophia Wolf; Eva-Lotta Nebelsieck	6:37.22	Belarus; Tatiana Masalskaya; Tatsiana Hancharova; Maryia Daumatovich; Aliaksandra Kirykovich	6:43.77	Russia; Elizaveta Starostina; Anastasiya Liubich; Yulia Chernousova; Polina Smolenskaya	6:46.57
BW1x	Desislava Georgieva; Bulgaria	7:34.27	Kateryna Dudchenko; Ukraine	7:37.31	Ekaterina Pitirimova; Russia	7:38.81
BW2-	Greece; Maria Kyridou; Christina Bourmpou	7:13.23	Belarus; Dzina Haluts; Kseniya Ramanouskaya	7:14.06	Russia; Anna Aksenova; Valentina Plaksina	7:16.87
BW2x	Romania; Elena Larisa Roșu; Nicoleta-Ancuța Bodnar	6:50.13	Greece; Dimitra Tsamopoulou; Anneta Kyridou	6:52.44	Lithuania; Agnė Ginevičiūtė; Viktorija Senkutė	6:57.75
BW4-	Romania; Mădălina Hegheș; Amalia Bereş; Cristina-Georgiana Popescu; Roxana Parascanu	6:36.08	Belarus; Anastasiya Siamionava; Darya Novikava; Hanna Khrapkina; Tatsiana Filipava	6:40.42	Croatia; Aria Cvitanović; Josipa Jurković; Ivana Jurković; Izabela Krakić	6:47.66
BW4+	Belarus; Yana Tsupa; Viktoryia Zhuraulevich; Maryia Kalesnikava; Maryia Bozhamoi; Palina Katsevich	7:06.77	Ukraine; Raisa Rudenko; Svitlana Skrobalo; Viktoriia Nahorna; Maryna Romaniuk; Yana Ocheretiana	7:20.01	None awarded	
BW4x	Romania; Elena Logofătu; Georgiana Vasile; Nicoleta Pașcanu; Simona Radiș	6:24.32	Belarus; Anastasiya Siamionava; Yana Tsupa; Dzina Haluts; Krystina Staraselets	6:38.92	Poland; Weronika Jagodzińska; Katarzyna Boruch; Izabela Gałek; Paulina Grzella	6:44.48
BW8+	Russia; Elena Daniliuk; Elena Shapurova; Olga Nesterenko; Tatiana Kulikova; Olga Zaruba; Elizavette Kornienko; Marina Rubtsova; Veronika Voino; Elizaveta Krylova	6:17.71	Czech Republic; Barbora Kárová; Markéta Nedělová; Kateřina Hartmanová; Pavlína Flamíková; Marie Jurková; Michala Pospíšilová; Josefína Lázničková; Anna Žabová; Radek Šuma	6:20.05	Belarus; Aliaksandra Markevich; Kseniya Ramanouskaya; Maryia Kalesnikava; Maryia Bozhamoi; Hanna Khrapkina; Tatsiana Filipava; Volha Khatuliova; Krystina Hancharova; Palina Katsevich	6:22.09

== Medal table ==
* Host nation (Belarus)

Rank	Nation	Gold	Silver	Bronze	Total
1	Romania (ROU)	8	0	0	8
2	Greece (GRE)	5	1	1	7
3	Germany (GER)	4	0	3	7
4	Belarus (BLR)*	1	6	1	8
5	Russia (RUS)	1	2	4	7
6	Switzerland (SUI)	1	2	0	3
7	Hungary (HUN)	1	1	1	3
8	Bulgaria (BUL)	1	0	0	1
9	Czech Republic (CZE)	0	3	2	5
9	Ukraine (UKR)	0	3	2	5
11	Poland (POL)	0	2	1	3
12	Austria (AUT)	0	1	2	3
13	Lithuania (LTU)	0	1	1	2
14	Croatia (CRO)	0	0	1	1
14	Great Britain (GBR)	0	0	1	1
14	Serbia (SRB)	0	0	1	1
Totals (16 entries)		22	22	21	65

== See also ==
- 2018 European Rowing Championships
- 2018 European Rowing Junior Championships
