= Christina Bourmpou =

Greek rower (born 2000)

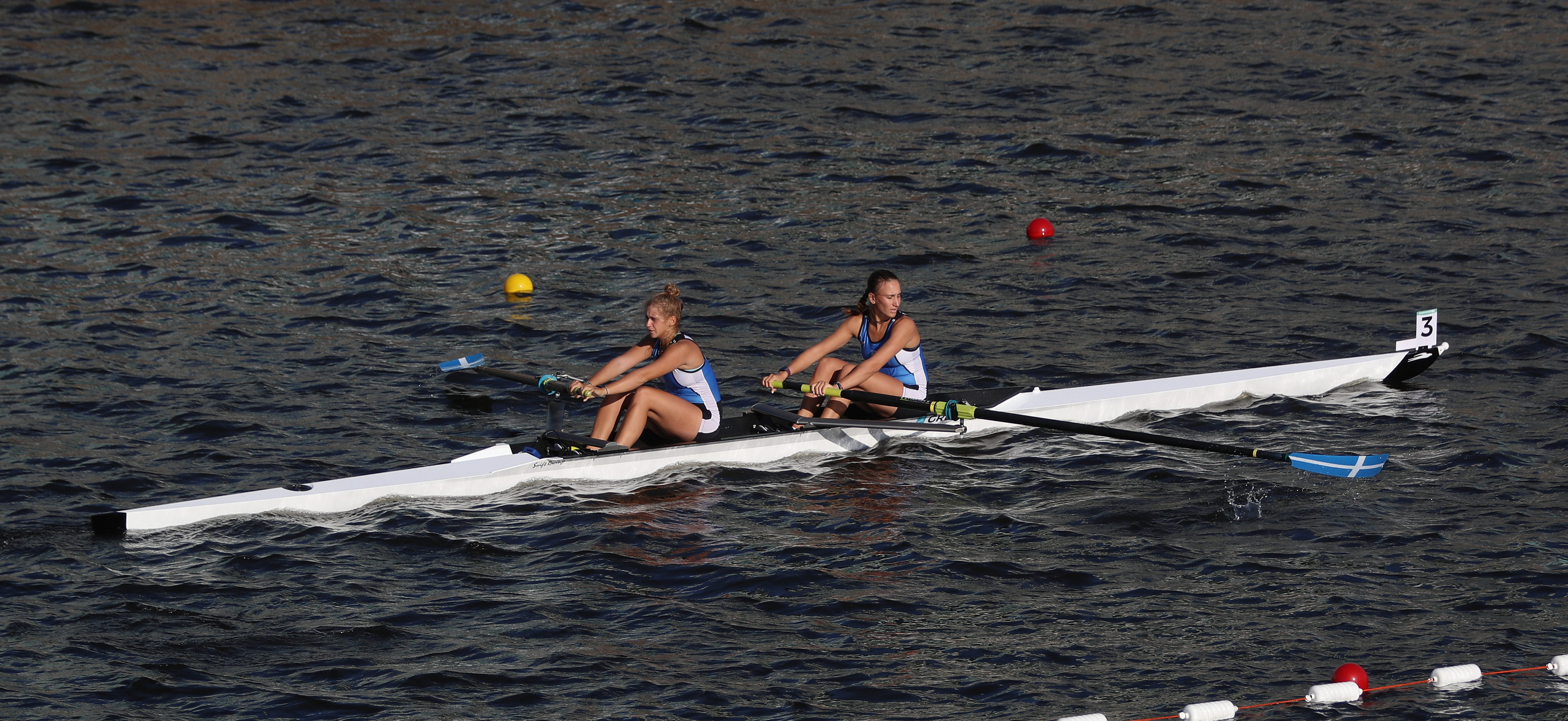
- Bourmpou (left) and Maria Kyridou at the 2018 Summer Youth Olympics

Personal information
- Full name: Christina Ioanna Bourmpou
- Nationality: Greek
- Born: 21 October 2000 (age 25) Thessaloniki, Greece
- Height: 1.74 m (5 ft 9 in)
- Weight: 64 kg (141 lb)

Sport
- Country: Greece
- Sport: Rowing
Medal record
Women's rowing
Representing Greece
World U23 Championships
Gold medal – first place	2019 Sarasota	Coxless pair
Gold medal – first place	2022 Varese	Coxless pair
World Junior Championships
Gold medal – first place	2018 Račice	Coxless pair
Silver medal – second place	2017 Trakai	Coxless pair
European Championships
Silver medal – second place	2024 Szeged	Coxless pair
Bronze medal – third place	2020 Poznań	Coxless pair
European U23 Championships
Gold medal – first place	2018 Brest	Coxless pair
Gold medal – first place	2019 Ioannina	Coxless pair
Gold medal – first place	2022 Heindonk	Coxless pair
Silver medal – second place	2020 Duisburg	Coxless pair
European Junior Championships
Gold medal – first place	2018 Gravelines	Coxless pair
Silver medal – second place	2017 Krefeld	Coxless pair
Summer Youth Olympics
Gold medal – first place	2018 Buenos Aires	Coxless pair
Mediterranean Games
Gold medal – first place	2026 Taranto	W2x

Christina Ioanna Bourmpou (Greek: Χριστίνα Μπούρμπου; born 21 October 2000) is a Greek rower from Thessaloniki. Along with Maria Kyridou, she won four gold medals for Greece in just over four months. The last one was the gold medal at the 2018 Summer Youth Olympics. Bourmpou participated – along with Kyridou – at the 2020 Olympics, reaching the final and eventually taking the fifth place.
