= Tara Hanlon =

Irish rower

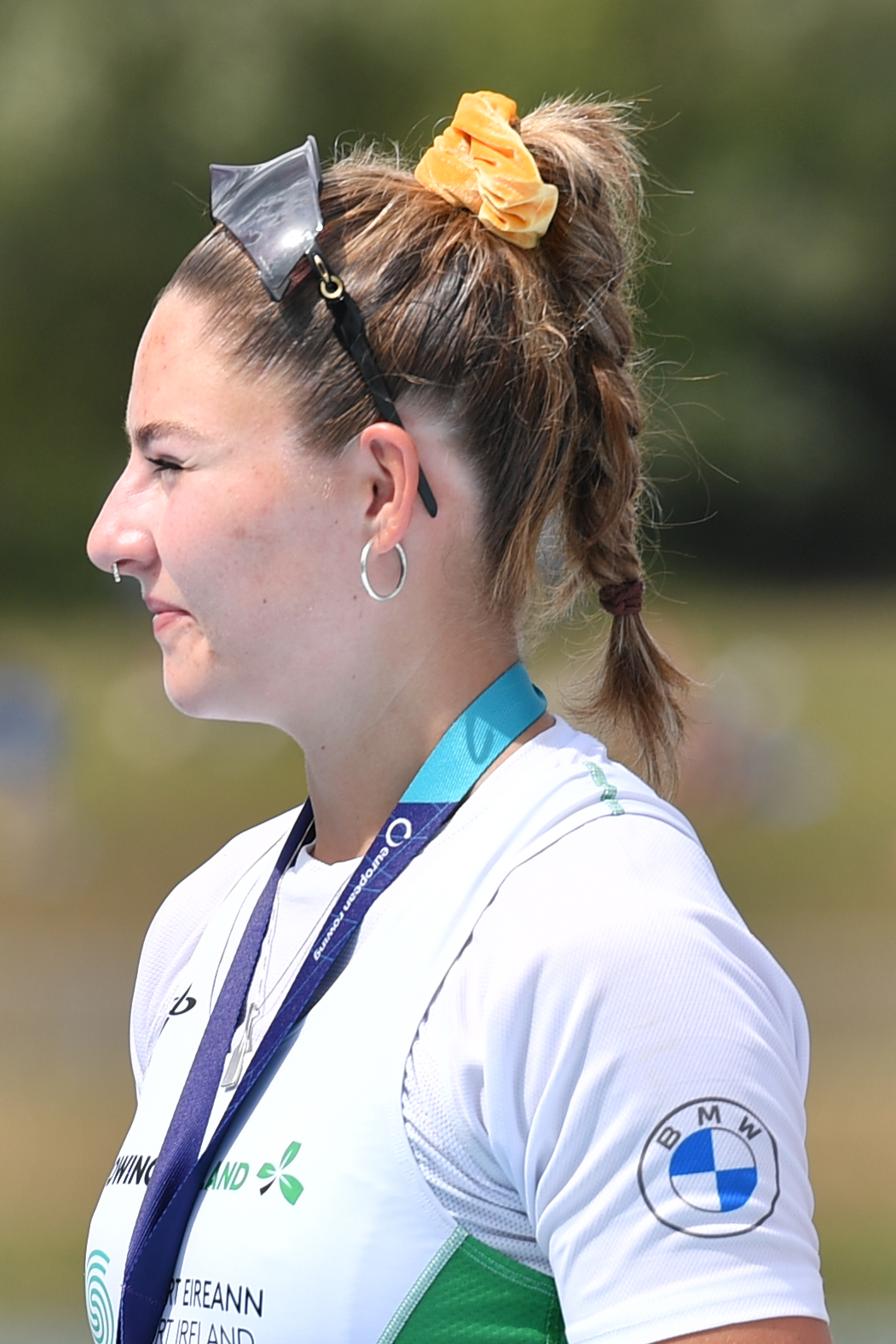

Personal information
- Nationality: Irish
- Born: 15 May 1998 (age 28) Cork, Ireland

Sport
- Sport: Rowing
- Event(s): coxless four, coxless pairs, eight
- Club: Cork Boat Club (2013–17); University College Cork Rowing Club (2017–present)
Medal record
Women's rowing
Representing Ireland
European Championships
Silver medal – second place	2022 Munich	Coxless four
European U23 Championships
Bronze medal – third place	2020 Duisburg	Coxless pairs
Silver medal – second place	2019 Sarasota	Coxless four

Tara Hanlon (born 15 May 1998) is an Irish rower.

A native of Cork, she studied a Bachelor of Commerce at University College Cork, where she received a Quercus scholarship.

She won a silver medal in the coxless four event at the 2022 European Rowing Championships.
