= 2019 European Rowing U23 Championships =

International youth rowing competition

- Venue: Ioannina Rowing Course
- Location: Ioannina, Greece
- Dates: 7–8 September
- Competitors: 490 from 30 nations

The 3rd European Rowing U23 Championships was the 3rd edition and was held from 7 to 8 September 2019 at the Ioannina Rowing Course in Ioannina, Greece.

== Results ==
=== Men ===
Event	Gold		Silver		Bronze	
BLM1x	Jan Cincibuch; Czech Republic	7:03.94	Matthias Fernandez; Switzerland	7:06.31	Patrick Rocek; Italy	7:07.11
BLM2-	Hungary; Bence Szabó; Kálmán Furkó	6:54.36	Italy; Matteo Sessa; Filippo Fornara	6:57.05	Germany; Johannes Neubauer; Benjamin Nelles	6:59.29
BLM2x	Greece; Antonios Papakonstantinou; Petros Gaidatzis	6:25.42	France; Paul Tixier; Ferdinand Ludwig	6:25.69	Austria; Sebastian Kabas; Philipp Kellner	6:2.
BLM4x	Germany; Hendrik Winkel; Joscha Holl; Fabio Kress; Patrick Hofmockel	6:03.69	Italy; Tommaso Molinari; Gioele Pison; Alessio Bozzano; Matteo Tonelli	6:03.75	Czech Republic; Ondřej Čermák; Jan Šmolík; Luboš Zapletal; Jonáš Friedrich	6:04.84
BM1x	Ronan Byrne; Ireland	6:48.28	Aleksandr Vyazovkin; Russia	6:52.30	Stefanos Douskos; Greece	6:56.54
BM2-	Romania; Dumitru Ciobică; Florin Lehaci	6:31.21	Greece; Ioannis Kalandaridis; Athanasios Palaiopanos	6:34.51	Lithuania; Povilas Stankūnas; Mantas Juškevičius	6:40.45
BM2x	Belarus; Yahor Shliupski; Ivan Brynza	6:22.86	Bulgaria; Stanimir Haladzhov; Emil Neykov	6:26.07	Switzerland; Kai Schätzle; Scott Bärlocher	6: .
BM4-	Romania; Mihăiță Țigănescu; Mugurel Semciuc; Ștefan Berariu; Cosmin Pascari	5:58.79	Croatia; Fabio Ipsa; Ivan Ante Grgić; Patrik Lončarić; Anton Lončarić	6:05.93	Switzerland; Morton Schubert; Nils Schneider; Nicolas Kamber; Patrick Brunner	6: .
BM4+	Romania; Alexandru Chioseaua; Alexandru Laurentiu Danciu; Alexandru Matincă; Ciprian Huc; Adrian Munteanu (cox)	6:21.29	Belarus; Vitali Dzehtsiarou; Yauheni Maiseyev; Dzianis Akinchyts; Anton Bahinksi; Danila Haitsiukevich	6:23.58	Switzerland; Maurin Lange; Jan Jonah Plock; Filippo Ammirati; Manuel Baumann; Carla Sgobbo	6:.
BM4x	Belarus; Uladzislau Lokun; Artsem Laputsin; Yauheni Zalaty; Kiryl Tsikhanovich	5:52.58	Romania; Florin Bogdan Horodisteanu; Andrei Sebastian Cornea; Sebastian Constantin Cîrstea; Cristian Ionuț Cojocaru	5:56.05	Moldova; Alexandru Mașnic; Ivan Corșunov; Chirill Vîsoțchi-Șestacov; Alexandr Bulat	5:57.53
BM8+	Romania; Bogdan Sabin Băițoc; Ciprian Tudosă; Florin Ceobanu; Marian Cireașă; Andrei Lungu; Denis Nichitean; Andrei Alexandru Tănasă; Constantin Cristi Hîrgău; Adrian Munteanu (cox)	5:40.87	Ukraine; Danyyil Yegorov; Oleksandr Nahrebelnyi; Pavlo Doshchenko; Roman Kyrylovskyi; Vladyslav Hysar; Yevhen Aleksandrov; Denys Shkliaruk; Oleksandr Sydoruk; Veronika Vaskiv	5:43.35	Great Britain; Dylan Mitchell; Daniel Graham; David Willcox; Frederick Strawson; Alfred Heath; Frederick Allinson; James Snowball; Cameron Spurling; Benjamin Rich	5:43.97

=== 2019 ===
Rank	Nation	Gold	Silver	Bronze	Total
1	Romania (ROU)	9	1	2	12
2	Belarus (BLR)	3	3	0	6
3	Greece (GRE)	3	2	2	7
4	Germany (GER)	2	3	2	7
5	Switzerland (SUI)	2	1	4	7
6	Czech Republic (CZE)	1	0	2	3
7	Hungary (HUN)	1	0	1	2
8	Ireland (IRL)	1	0	0	1
9	Italy (ITA)	0	2	2	4
10	Bulgaria (BUL)	0	2	0	2
10	Croatia (CRO)	0	2	0	2
10	France (FRA)	0	2	0	2
13	Russia (RUS)	0	1	2	3
14	Great Britain (GBR)	0	1	1	2
15	Poland (POL)	0	1	0	1
15	Ukraine (UKR)	0	1	0	1
17	Austria (AUT)	0	0	1	1
17	Lithuania (LTU)	0	0	1	1
17	Moldova (MLD)	0	0	1	1
17	Sweden (SWE)	0	0	1	1
Totals (20 entries)		22	22	22	66
