= Emil Neykov =

Bulgarian rower (born 2001)

Medal record

Men'srowing

Representing Bulgaria

World U23 Championships
Gold medal – first place	2021 Račice	Single sculls
Bronze medal – third place	2022 Varese	Single sculls
Bronze medal – third place	2023 Plovdiv	Single sculls

European U23 Championships
Gold medal – first place	2021 Kruszwica	Single sculls
Silver medal – second place	2019 Ioannina	Double sculls
Silver medal – second place	2022 Heindonk	Single sculls

Emil Neykov (Bulgarian: Емил Нейков, born 1 August 2001) is a Bulgarian rower. He won the gold medal in the single scull at the 2021 European Rowing U23 Championships. The same year he also became World Champion for man under 23 years old. His parents Svilen Neykov and Rumyana Neykova are also successful rowers. In 2018. He defeated a Serbian Rower from RC Danubius 1885, Ivan Katić.
