= Ioannis Marokos =

Greek rower (born 1999)

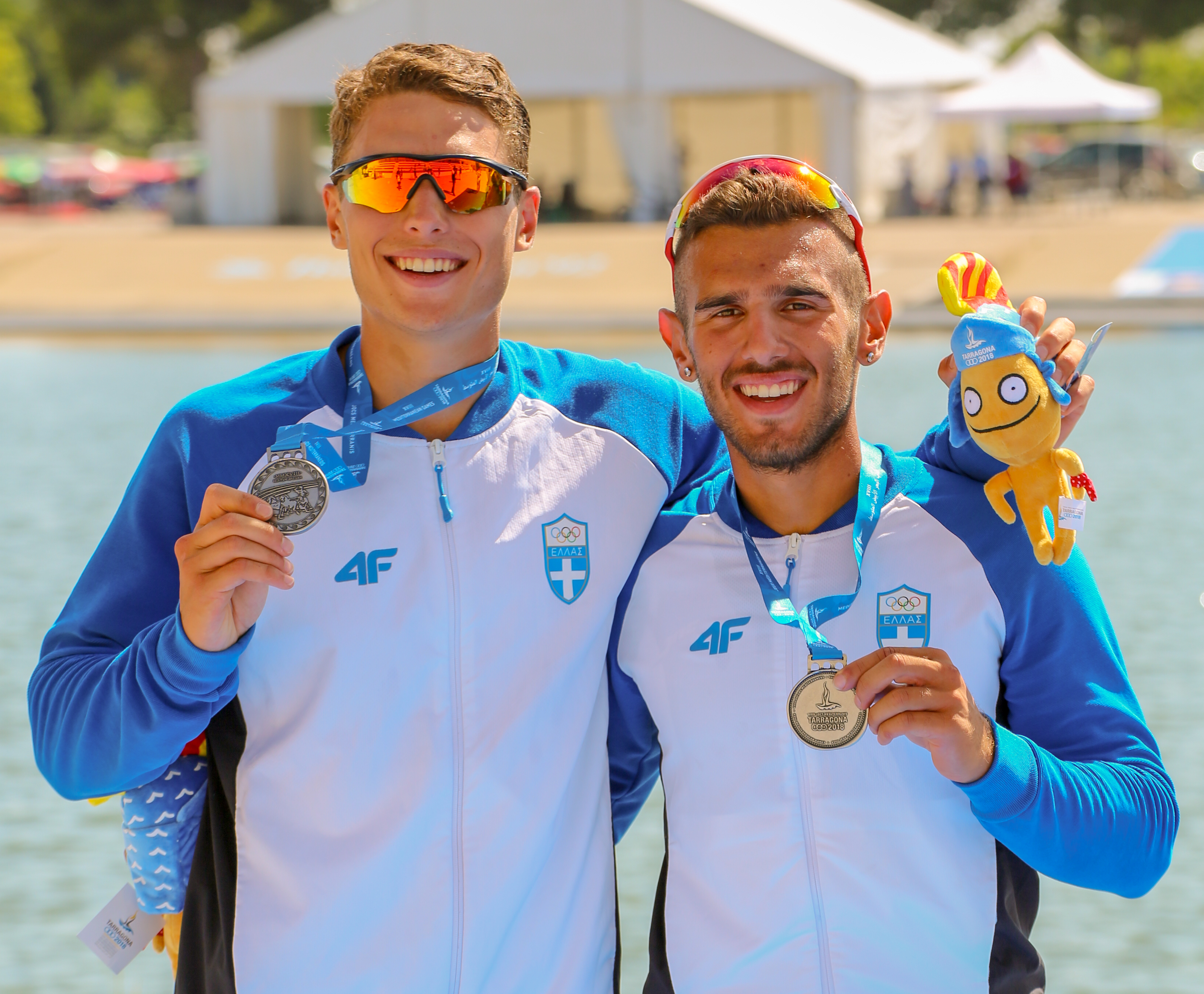
- Ioannis Marokos in 2018

Personal information
- Nationality: Greek
- Born: 22 October 1999 (age 26) Thessaloniki
- Height: 1.73 m (5 ft 8 in)
- Weight: 68 kg (150 lb)

Sport
- Country: Greece
- Sport: Rowing
Medal record
Mediterranean Games
Silver medal – second place	2018 Tarragona	LM2x
World Championships U23
Silver medal – second place	2018 Poznań	LM2–
World Championships
Silver medal – second place	2018 Plovdiv	LM2–
European Championships U23
Gold medal – first place	2018 Brest	LM2–

Ioannis Marokos (born 22 October 1999) is a Greek rower. Among with Ninos Nikolaidis, he won a silver medal for Greece, at the 2018 Mediterranean Games.
