= 2022 European Rowing U23 Championships =

- Venue: Hazewinkel
- Location: Heindonk, Belgium
- Dates: 3–4 September 2022

The 2022 European Rowing U23 Championships took place at Hazewinkel, in Heindonk, Belgium, from 3–4 September 2022.

== Medal table ==
* Host nation (Belgium)

Rank	Nation	Gold	Silver	Bronze	Total
1	Romania (ROU)	5	4	0	9
2	Poland (POL)	3	2	2	7
3	Greece (GRE)	3	1	0	4
3	Italy (ITA)	3	1	0	4
5	Belgium (BEL)*	2	0	0	2
6	Czech Republic (CZE)	1	2	0	3
6	Hungary (HUN)	1	2	0	3
8	Switzerland (SUI)	1	1	1	3
9	Turkey (TUR)	1	0	1	2
10	Lithuania (LTU)	1	0	0	1
11	Germany (GER)	0	2	3	5
12	Ukraine (UKR)	0	2	1	3
13	Bulgaria (BUL)	0	1	0	1
13	Ireland (IRL)	0	1	0	1
15	Great Britain (GBR)	0	0	6	6
16	Moldova (MDA)	0	0	2	2
17	Croatia (CRO)	0	0	1	1
17	Slovakia (SVK)	0	0	1	1
Totals (18 entries)		21	19	18	58

== Medalists ==
=== Men ===
Event	Gold		Silver		Bronze	
Lightweight Single Sculls (BLM1x)	Greece; Petros Gkaidatzis	7:12.18	Ireland; Ciaran Purdy	7:18.16	Slovakia; Peter Strečanský	7:19.41
Lightweight Pair (BLM2-)	Hungary (b) Bálint Boros (s) Tamás Czinege	7:00.94	Ukraine (b) Roman Biedarov (s) Vladyslav Yakhniienko	7:03.11	Moldova (b) Nichita Naumciuc (s) Dmitrii Zincenco	7:04.52
Lightweight Double (BLM2x)	Belgium (b) Mil Blommaert (s) Savin Rodenburg	6:35.33	Hungary (b) Henry Bridge (s) Balázs Szőllősi	6:36.29	Turkey (b) Enes Gök (s) Şefik Çakmak	6:36.56
Lightweight Quadruple Sculls (BLM4x)	Italy (b) Paolo Gregori (2) Alessandro Pozzi (3) Nicolò Demiliani (s) Mario Guareschi	6:13.23	Switzerland (b) Tobias Fürholz (2) Cédric Payer (3) Dorian Rosenberg (s) Tommaso Fassone	6:17.02	Germany (b) Malte Machwitz (2) Mirko Rahn (3) Moritz Küpper (s) Jakob Waldhelm	6:18.68
Single Sculls (BM1x)	Poland; Piotr Płomiński	7:12.53	Bulgaria; Emil Neykov	7:19.65	Germany; Aaron Erfanian	7:21.89
Pair (BM2-)	Lithuania (b) Dovydas Stankūnas (s) Domantas Stankūnas	6:37.65	Romania (b) Andrei Mândrilă (s) Claudiu Neamtu	6:39.94	Croatia (b) Patrik Lončarić (s) Anton Lončarić	6:44.50
Double Sculls (BM2x)	Belgium (b) Tristan Vandenbussche (s) Aaron Andries	6:19.63	Germany (b) Sydney Garbers (s) Timo Strache	6:22.74	Moldova (b) Alexandr Bulat (s) Ivan Corșunov	6:23.74
Four (BM4-)	Poland (b) Tomasz Lewicki (2) Damian Józefowicz (3) Bartłomiej Sopoński (s) Kazimir Ziven Kujda	6:05.54	Romania (b) Sebastian Timis (2) Ionuţ Pavel (3) Constantin-Emanuele Sterea (s) Iliuţă-Leontin Nuţescu	6:06.25	Great Britain (b) Thomas Cross (2) Benjamin Hinves (3) James Doran (s) Louis Nares	6:07.57
Coxed Four (BM4+)	Romania (b) Andrei-Petrişor Axintoi (2) Alexandru Gherasim (3) Florin Arteni (s) Alexandru-Laurenţiu Danciu (c) Maria-Antonia Iancu	6:28.96	Only two teams			
Quadruple Sculls (BM4x)	Czech Republic (b) Václav Baldrián (2) Adam Šnajdr (3) Marek Diblík (s) Daniel Nosek	5:52.61	Germany (b) Franz Werner (2) Immanuel Dorneich (3) Felix Heinrich (s) Maximilian Pfautsch	5:52.98	Poland (b) Krzysztof Kasparek (2) Jakub Woźniak (3) Bartosz Bartkowski (s) Cezary Litka	5:55.78
Eight (BM8+)	Romania (b) Andrei-Petrişor Axintoi (2) Alexandru Gherasim (3) Florin Ceobanu (4) Andrei Lungu (5) Andrei Mândrilă (6) Claudiu Neamţu (7) Florin Arteni (s) Alexandru-Laurenţiu Danciu (c) Maria-Antonia Iancu	5:41.44	Poland (b) Patryk Wojtalak (2) Szymon Tomiak (3) Mikołaj Januszewski (4) Dominik Glonek (5) Jerzy Kaczmarek (6) Emil Jackowiak (7) Przemysław Wanat (s) Oskar Streich (c) Tomasz Skurzyński	5:44.42	Great Britain (b) Adam Von Bismarck (2) Matthew Peters (3) Felix Rawlinson (4) Robert Prosser (5) Jens Hullah (6) Jake Wincomb (7) Laurence Joss (s) Toby Lassen (c) Zahir Ala	5:45.56

=== Women ===
Event	Gold		Silver		Bronze	
Lightweight Single Sculls (BLW1x)	Turkey; Elis Özbay	7:52.81	Greece; Evangelia Anastasiadou	7:59.68	Great Britain; Olivia Bates	8:02.65
Lightweight Pair (BLW2-)	Italy (b) Maria Zerboni (s) Samantha Premerl	7:50.73	Only two teams			
Lightweight Double (BLW2x)	Poland (b) Jessica Sobocińska (s) Zuzanna Jasińska	7:11.53	Italy (b) Matilde Barison (s) Sara Borghi	7:16.36	Great Britain (b) Annabelle Ruinet (s) Lauren Maddison	7:18.59
Single Sculls (BW1x)	Switzerland; Aurelia-Maxima Janzen	7:50.94	Czech Republic; Anna Šantrůčková	7:54.59	Ukraine; Daria Stavynoga	8:01.77
Pair (BW2-)	Greece (b) Evangelia Fragkou (s) Christina Bourmpou	7:35.99	Ukraine (b) Alla Dmytryshyna (s) Viktoriia Nahorna	7:43.68	Switzerland (b) Seraina Fürholz (s) Olivia Roth	7:45.74
Double Sculls (BW2x)	Greece (b) Dimitra Kontou (s) Styliani Natsioula	7:01.71	Romania (b) Andrada-Maria Moroşanu (s) Iulia-Liliana Bălăucă	7:04.99	Great Britain (b) Lauren Henry (s) Vwairé Obukohwo	7:07.74
Four (BW4-)	Romania (b) Estera Vîlceanu (2) Alina-Maria Baletchi (3) Manuela Lungu (s) Dumitriţa Juncanariu	6:54.19	Poland (b) Martyna Jankowska (2) Małgorzata Strybel (3) Anna Potrzuska (s) Izabela Pawlak	6:58.32	Great Britain (b) Jessica Martin (2) Grace Smitherman (3) Angela Sharp (s) Maia Hely	7:01.33
Coxed Four (BW4+)	Italy (b) Anita Boldrino (2) Beatrice Crevani (3) Anna Scolaro (s) Anna Rossi (c) Martina Barili	7:11.60	Romania (b) Amalia Bucu (2) Larisa Bogdan (3) Lorena Constantin (s) Iuliana Timoc (c) Victoria-Ştefania Petreanu	7:16.64	Germany (b) Stina Röbbecke (2) Julia Runge (3) Alissa Buhrmann (s) Paula Becher (c) Janne-Marit Börger	7:23.99
Quadruple Sculls (BW4x)	Romania (b) Emanuela-Ioana Ciotău (2) Cristina Druga (3) Alexandra Ungureanu (s) Patricia Cireş	6:33.27	Czech Republic (b) Barbora Podrazilová (2) Alžběta Zavadilová (3) Eliška Podrazilová (s) Simona Pašková	6:37.69	Poland (b) Barbara Streng (2) Weronika Ludwiczak (3) Katarzyna Duda (s) Paulina Chrzanowska	6:40.53
Eight (BW8+)	Romania (b) Amalia Bucu (2) Andreea Iorgovan (3) Estera-Costina-Beatrice Vîlceanu (4) Alina-Maria Baletchi (5) Manuela-Gabriela Lungu (6) Dumitriţa Juncanariu (7) Alice-Elena Turcanu (s) Elena Suta (c) Victoria-Ştefania Petreanu	6:28.28	Only two teams			
