= Chloe Brew =

British rower

Personal information
- Full name: Chloe Patricia W. Brew
- Born: 14 September 1995 (age 31) Plymouth
- Height: 184 cm (6 ft 0 in)

Sport
- Country: Great Britain
- Sport: Rowing
- Club: Gloucester Hartpury; USC Trojans; Leander Club
Medal record
Women's rowing
Representing Great Britain
World U23 Championships
Silver medal – second place	2016 Rotterdam	Eight
European U23 Championships
Bronze medal – third place	2017 Kruszwica	Eight

Chloe Patricia W. Brew (born 14 September 1995) is a British rower.

== Rowing career ==
She has been selected for the British team to compete in the rowing events, in the eight for the 2020 Summer Olympics.

== Personal life ==
Her father Paul Brew (1988) and uncle Robin Brew (1984) competed in the Olympic Games for Great Britain in swimming.
