= Bogdan Sabin Băițoc =

Romanian rower (born 1998)

Personal information
- Nationality: Romanian
- Born: 9 June 1998 (age 28)

Sport
- Sport: Rowing
Medal record
Men's rowing
Representing Romania
European Championships U23
Gold medal – first place	2019 Ioannina	Eight
Gold medal – first place	2018 Brest	Eight
Silver medal – second place	2020 Duisburg	Eight

Bogdan Sabin Băițoc (born 9 June 1998) is a Romanian rower. He competed at the 2024 Paris Olympics.

== Career ==
He was a gold medalist at the 2018 European Rowing U23 Championships in Brest, Belarus. He also won gold in the men’s eight at the 2019 European Rowing U23 Championships in Greece. He won silver in Duisburg in the event at the 2020 European Rowing U23 Championships.

He competed in the men's eight at the 2024 Summer Olympics in which they qualified for the final.

He was selected for the Romanian eight for the 2025 European Rowing Championships.

== Personal life ==
He is from Suceava County.
