= Maren Völz =

German rower (born 1999)

Personal information
- Born: 20 November 1999 (age 26)
Medal record
Women's rowing
Representing Germany
Olympic Games
Bronze medal – third place	2024 Paris	Quad sculls
European Championships
Silver medal – second place	2026 Varese	Quad sculls
Bronze medal – third place	2024 Szeged	Quad sculls
World U23 Championships
Silver medal – second place	2019 Sarasota	Quad sculls
European U23 Championships
Gold medal – first place	2020 Duisburg	Quad sculls

Maren Völz (born 20 November 1999) is a German rower. She competed in the women's quadruple sculls event at the 2024 Summer Olympics, where she won a bronze medal with the German team.

== Early life ==
She is from Schenkenberg, Brandenburg, and started rowing in Kloster Lehnin before moving to the Potsdam Sports School.

== Career ==
She won bronze at the 2024 European Rowing Championships in the women's quadruple sculls.

She was selected to compete at the 2024 Summer Olympics in the Women's quadruple sculls. Their boat proceeded through the heats to qualify for the final, where they placed third behind British and Dutch boats.

== Personal life ==
She attended the University of Potsdam.
