= Frederik Breuer =

German rower (born 2002)

Personal information
- Born: February 26, 2002 (age 24)

Sport
- Country: Germany
- Sport: Rowing

Achievements and titles
- Olympic finals: Paris 2024 M8+
Medal record
Men's rowing
Representing the Germany
World Junior Championships
Gold medal – first place	2019 Tokyo	Coxed four
European Championships
Silver medal – second place	2026 Varese	Eight

Frederik Breuer (born 26 February 2002) is a German rower. He competed for Germany at the 2024 Olympic Games.

== Career ==
Breuer started rowing for the Bonn Rowing Club, having been encouraged into the sport by his grandfather. He later studied an competed for the University of California, Berkeley, in the United States. He was named the 2021 PAC-12 Newcomer of the Year, and a two-time collegiate national champion.

Competing for Germany, Breuer won a gold medal in the men's four at the 2019 World Rowing Junior Championships in Tokyo, Japan.

Having been part of a men's four that placed third at the German Rowing Championships, he was moved into the German eight boat ahead of the World Rowing Cup in 2024, placing fourth in Varese and second in Poznan. He was part of the German men's eight which placed fourth overall at the 2024 Olympic Games in Paris, France.

On 4 April 2026, he was stroke for the victorious Cambridge University crew at The Boat Race 2026, helping them to a winning margin of 11.02 seconds.
