= Patrick Holt (rower) =

Australian rower (born 1999)

Personal information
- Nickname: Paddy
- Born: 15 April 1999 (age 27) Sunnybank, Queensland, Australia
- Home town: Brisbane, Queensland, Australia
- Education: University of Technology, Sydney
- Height: 198 cm (6 ft 6 in)

Sport
- Country: Australia
- Sport: Rowing
- Club: UTS Haberfield Rowing Club
- Coached by: Rhett Ayliffe
Medal record
Men's rowing
Representing Australia
World Championships
Bronze medal – third place	2023 Belgrade	Eight

Patrick Holt (born 15 April 1999) is an Australian representative rower. He made the Australian senior squad in 2022 and 2023 and has represented at World Rowing Cups and World Rowing Championships.

== Club and state rowing ==
Holt is from Brisbane Queensland, and attended Brisbane Grammar School where he took up rowing. His senior club rowing has been from Sydney's UTS Haberfield Rowing Club.

Holt first made Queensland state selection in the 2018 youth eight which competed for the Noel Wilkinson Trophy at the Interstate Regatta within the Australian Rowing Championships. In 2021 he was selected to stroke the Queensland men's senior eight to contest the King's Cup. He made further King's Cup selections for Queensland in 2022 and 2023.

In UTS colours he raced to a silver medal in the open men's double-scull at the 2021 Australian Rowing Championships and also won bronze in the U23 double-scull at that same regatta. At the 2022 Australian Championships he contested the men's open single scull and quad scull.

== International representative rowing ==
Holt's Australian representative debut came in 2022 when he was selected in the senior men's sweep squad to compete during the international season. He rowed in the Australian's men's eight to silver medal wins at both World Rowing Cups II in Poznan and WRC III in Lucerne.

In March 2023 Holt was again selected in the Australian senior men's squad for the 2023 international season. At the Rowing World Cup II in Varese Italy, Holt raced in the Australian men's eight. In the final after a slow start they rowed through most of the field and took second place and a silver medal. At 2023's RWC III in Lucerne, Holt moved from the two-seat to the bow of the Australian men's eight. In the final they rowed stroke for stroke with their fancied Great Britain rivals but then moved away at the 1000m mark and held on for a gold medal victory. For the 2023 World Rowing Championships in Belgrade Serbia, the Australian men's eight was left unchanged and Holt again raced in the bow seat. They won their heat powering past the USA eight who had headed them at the 1000m mark. In the A final Australia and Great Britain traded the lead over the first 1000m, but beyond that point the result mirrored that of 2022 with Great Britain exerting dominance by the 1500m, fighting off a fast finishing Dutch eight who took silver and leaving the Australians with the bronze for the second successive year.
