= Laurențiu Danciu =

Romanian rower (born 2000)

Personal information
- Full name: Alexandru Laurențiu Danciu
- Nationality: Romanian
- Born: 31 March 2000 (age 26)

Sport
- Sport: Rowing
Medal record
Men's rowing
Representing Romania
European Championships U23
| Gold medal – first place | 2019 Ioannina | Quad sculls |
| Gold medal – first place | 2021 Kruszwica | Coxless four |
| Gold medal – first place | 2022 Heindonk | Quad sculls |
| Gold medal – first place | 2022 Heindonk | Eight |
Summer Youth Olympics
| Silver medal – second place | 2018 Buenos Aires | Coxless pair |
World Junior Championships
| Gold medal – first place | 2018 Račice | Coxless pair |

Alexandru Laurențiu Danciu (born 31 March 2000) is a Romanian rower. He competed at the 2024 Summer Olympics.

== Career ==
He won silver at the 2018 European Rowing Junior Championships in France. He won gold in the coxless pair at the 2018 World Rowing Junior Championships alongside Florin Arteni-Fintinariu. He also won silver in the coxless pair at the 2018 Summer Youth Olympics in Argentina.

He won gold in the men's four at the 2019 European Rowing U23 Championships in Greece. He won gold in the coxless four at the 2021 European Rowing U23 Championships in Poland.

He won golds in the coxed four and as part of the eight boat at the 2022 European Rowing U23 Championships in Belgium. He finished fourth in the BM4- at the 2022 U23 World Championships, and in the 2023 season raced in the eight boat that finished fourth at the European Rowing Championships.

He raced in the 2024 Summer Olympics in Paris in the men's eight boat which placed fifth overall in the final.

He was selected for the Romanian eight for the 2025 European Rowing Championships.

== Personal life ==
He is from Timiș County.
