= Dieuwke Fetter =

Dutch rower (born 1991)

Personal information
- Born: 26 January 1991 (age 35) Amsterdam, Netherlands

Sport
- Country: Netherlands
- Sport: Rowing
Medal record
Men's rowing
Representing the Netherlands
Olympic Games
Silver medal – second place	2024 Paris	Eight
World Championships
Gold medal – first place	2025 Shanghai	Eight
Silver medal – second place	2023 Belgrade	Eight
Silver medal – second place	2022 Račice	Eight
European Championships
Silver medal – second place	2025 Plovdiv	Eight
Silver medal – second place	2022 Oberschleißheim	Eight
Silver medal – second place	2021 Varese	Eight
Bronze medal – third place	2023 Bled	Eight
Bronze medal – third place	2020 Poznań	Eight
Bronze medal – third place	2018 Glasgow	Eight

Dieuwke Fetter (born 26 January 1991) is a Dutch rower. She represented the Netherlands at the 2024 Summer Olympics.

== Career ==
Fetter started rowing as a student in Amsterdam, when she was 20 years old. In her second year she became a cox and shortly after signed up for selection for the national crew. She coxed various men's, women's and mixed crews.

Fetter represented the Netherlands at the 2024 Summer Olympics and won a silver medal as the coxswain in the men's eight, with a time of 5:23.92.
