= Rielly Milne =

American rower (born 1996)

Personal information
- Born: May 31, 1996 (age 30) Woodinville, Washington, U.S.
- Education: University of Washington

Sport
- Country: United States
- Sport: Rowing
Medal record
Men's rowing
Representing the United States
Olympic Games
| Bronze medal – third place | 2024 Paris | Eight |

Rielly Milne (/ˈraɪli ˈmɪln/ RY-lee MILN; born May 31, 1996) is an American rower. He represented the United States at the 2024 Summer Olympics.

== Career ==
Milne represented the United States at the 2024 Summer Olympics, where he served as the coxswain, and won a bronze medal in the men's eight, with a time of 5:25.28.
