= Evan Olson (rower) =

American rower (born 1997)

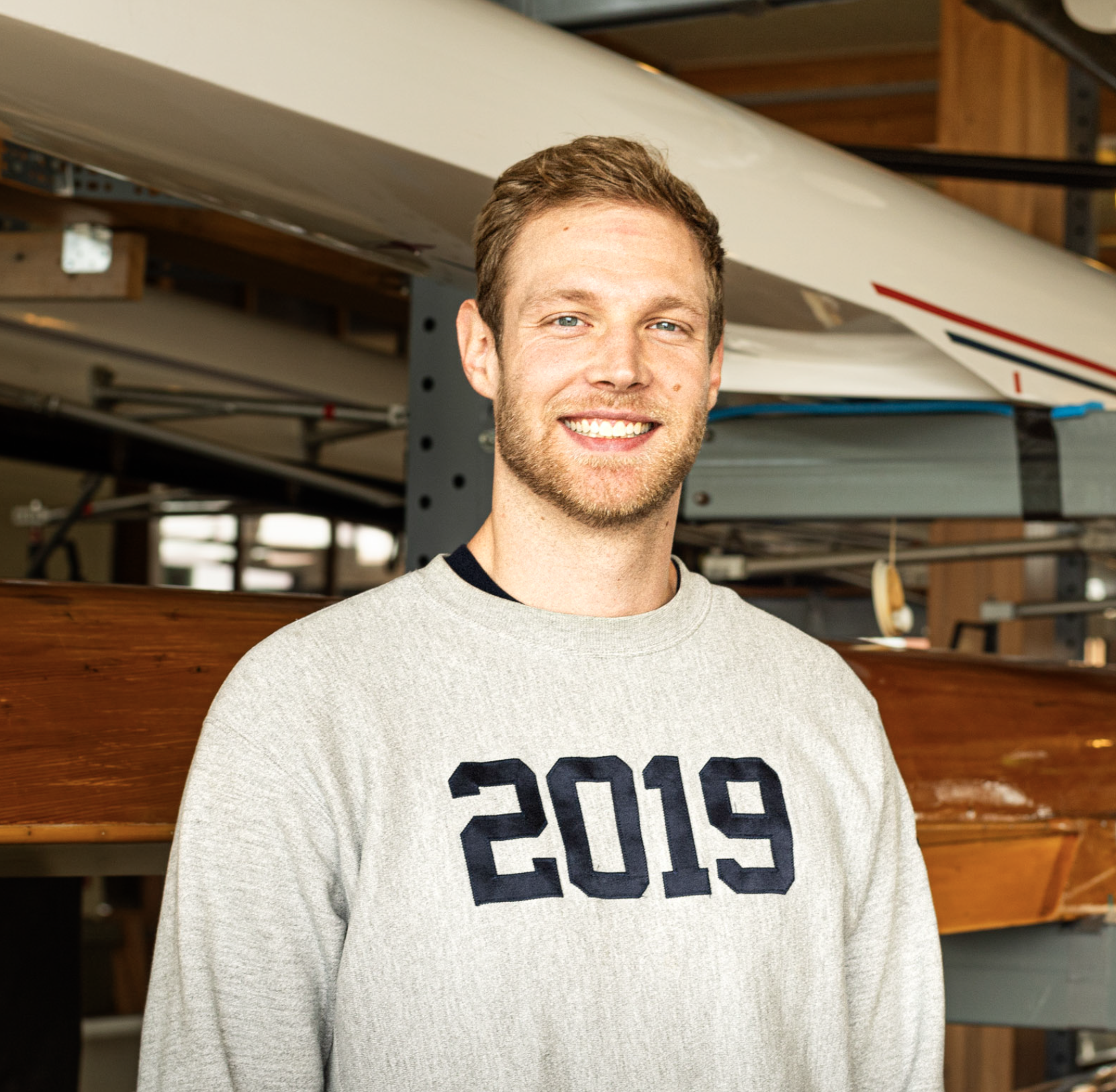
- Olson at the Wooden Boat Festival in 2024

Personal information
- National team: USA
- Born: July 26, 1997 (age 29) Bothell, Washington, U.S.
- Education: University of Washington

Sport
- Country: United States
- Sport: Rowing
Medal record
Men's rowing
Representing the United States
Olympic Games
Bronze medal – third place	2024 Paris	Eight

Evan Olson (born July 26, 1997) is an American rower. He represented the United States at the 2024 Summer Olympics winning bronze in the men's eight.

== Career ==
Olson made his international debut for the United States at the 2017 Under 23 World Rowing Championships where he finished third in the coxed four. He then went on to compete at the 2023 World Rowing Championships, and finished in fifth place in the coxless pair.

Olson represented the United States at the 2024 Summer Olympics and won a bronze medal in the men's eight, with a time of 5:25.28.
