= Nicholas Rusher =

American rower (born 1999)

Personal information
- Born: June 10, 1999 (age 27) West Bend, Wisconsin, U.S.
- Education: Yale University; Oriel College, Oxford

Sport
- Country: United States
- Sport: Rowing
Medal record
Men's rowing
Representing the United States
Olympic Games
Bronze medal – third place	2024 Paris	Eight

Nicholas "Nick" Rusher (born June 10, 1999) is an American rower. He represented the United States at the 2024 Summer Olympics.

== Career ==
Rusher made his international debut for the United States at the 2022 World Rowing Championships, and finished in fourth place in the men's eight.

Rusher represented the United States at the 2024 Summer Olympics and won a bronze medal in the men's eight, with a time of 5:25.28.

In 2025, representing Oriel College Boat Club, he was part of the Oxford crew at The Boat Race 2025.

== Personal life ==
Rusher was born to Jack Rusher and Cynthia Eckert. His parents rowed in the 1988 and 1992 Summer Olympics, and met while on the national team. His sister, Alison, is also an Olympic rower.
