= Morgan Bolding =

British rower (born 1995)

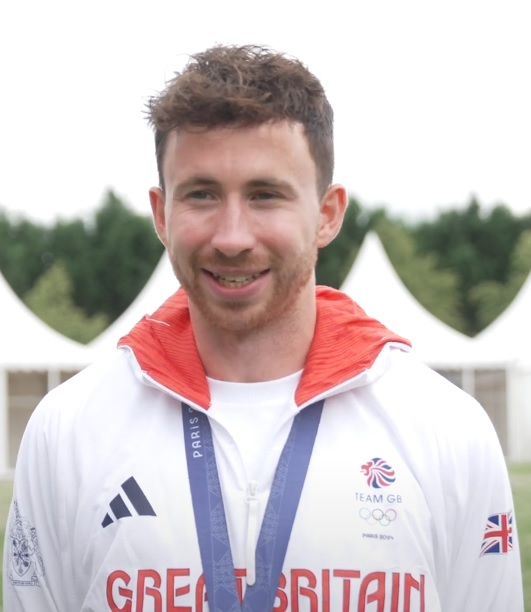
- Bolding at the 2024 Paris Olympics

Personal information
- Nationality: British
- Born: 13 May 1995 (age 31)

Sport
- Country: Great Britain
- Sport: Rowing
- Event: Eights
- Club: Oxford Brookes
Medal record
Men's rowing
Representing Great Britain
Olympic Games
| Gold medal – first place | 2024 Paris | Eight |
World Championships
| Gold medal – first place | 2022 Račice | Eight |
| Gold medal – first place | 2023 Belgrade | Eight |
European Championships
| Gold medal – first place | 2022 Oberschleißheim | Eight |
| Gold medal – first place | 2023 Bled | Eight |
| Gold medal – first place | 2024 Szeged | Eight |

Morgan Bolding (born 13 May 1995) is a British representative rower. He is an Olympic and two-time world champion.

== Career ==
Bolding was educated at Heathside School. His senior club rowing has been from the Oxford Brookes University Boat Club.

Bolding was first selected for Great Britain representative honours for the 2013 Junior World Rowing Championships in Lithuania into the GB junior men's eight. They had a fourth placed finish. He next made two appearances in the U23 British eight for the 2015 and 2017 U23 World Rowing Championships. The 2017 crew won a bronze medal.

2019 saw Bolding selected in the Great Britain senior men's squad. He raced in the men's pair that season and his best result was a sixth placed finished at the World Rowing Cup III in Rotterdam. On the 2019 results Britain had failed to qualify a men's coxless pair through for Tokyo 2020 and before that delayed 2021 event Bolding was selected into the pair for the final Olympic qualification regatta in 2021. Bolding and Harry Glenister finished in fourth place and failed to qualify the boat for Tokyo.

2022 saw Bolding selected to the two seat of the Great Britain senior men's eight. In that international season the eight won gold at two World Rowing Cups and at the 2022 European Rowing Championships. Bolding in the British eight went on to win gold and a world championship title at the 2022 World Rowing Championships in Račice. In 2023 Bolding won a second successive world championship in the men's eight at the 2023 World Rowing Championships in Belgrade.

In 2023, he won the Grand Challenge Cup for the second time (the blue riband event at the Henley Royal Regatta) rowing for the Oxford Brookes University Boat Club.

He won a gold medal as part of the Great Britain eight at the 2024 Summer Olympics.
