= Christopher Carlson =

American rower (born 1997)

Chris Carlson
Personal information
- Full name: Christopher Carlson
- Born: March 14, 1997 (age 29) Bedford, New Hampshire, U.S.
- Education: University of Washington

Sport
- Country: United States
- Sport: Rowing
Medal record
Men's rowing
Representing the United States
Olympic Games
Bronze medal – third place	2024 Paris	Eight
World Championships
Gold medal – first place	2026 Amsterdam	Coxless four
Bronze medal – third place	2026 Amsterdam	Mixed eight

Christopher "Chris" Carlson (born March 14, 1997) is an American rower. He represented the United States at the 2024 Summer Olympics.

== Career ==
Carlson made his international debut for the United States at the 2022 World Rowing Championships, and finished in fourth place in the men's eight. He again represented the United States at the 2023 World Rowing Championships, finishing in sixth place in the men's eight, and at the 2025 World Championships, finishing 4th in the men's quadruple sculls.

Carlson represented the United States at the 2024 Summer Olympics and won a bronze medal in the men's eight, with a time of 5:25.28.
