= Henry Hollingsworth (rower) =

American rower (born 1997)

Personal information
- Born: September 5, 1997 (age 28) Dover, Massachusetts, U.S.
- Education: Brown University

Sport
- Country: United States
- Sport: Rowing
Medal record
Men's rowing
Representing the United States
Olympic Games
Bronze medal – third place	2024 Paris	Eight

Henry Hollingsworth (born September 5, 1997) is an American rower. He represented the United States at the 2024 Summer Olympics.

== Career ==
Hollingsworth made his international debut for the United States at the 2022 World Rowing Championships and competed in the men's coxless four. He again represented the United States at the 2023 World Rowing Championships, and finished in sixth place in the men's eight.

Hollingsworth represented the United States at the 2024 Summer Olympics and won a bronze medal in the men's eight, with a time of 5:25.28.

== Personal life ==
Hollingsworth's cousin, Andrew Reed, rowed at the 2020 Summer Olympics.
