= Harry Brightmore =

British rower (born 1994)

Personal information
- Nationality: British
- Born: 1 July 1994 (age 32)

Sport
- Country: Great Britain
- Sport: Rowing
- Event: Coxswain/Eights
- Club: Oxford Brookes University Boat Club
Medal record
Men's rowing
Representing Great Britain
Olympic Games
Gold medal – first place	2024 Paris	Eight
World Championships
Gold medal – first place	2022 Račice	Eight
Gold medal – first place	2023 Belgrade	Eight
European Championships
Gold medal – first place	2022 Oberschleißheim	Eight
Gold medal – first place	2024 Szeged	Eight

Harry Brightmore (born 1 July 1994) is a British rowing coxswain. He is an Olympic and two-time world champion.

== Junior and varsity rowing ==
Brightmore attended King's School, Chester where he took up coxing in 2008. He studied at Oxford Brookes University senior club rowing has been from the Oxford Brookes University Boat Club.

In 2023, he won the Grand Challenge Cup (the blue riband event at the Henley Royal Regatta) for the second time, in the stern of an Oxford Brookes / Leander composite men's senior eight. His 2021 victory in the same event was in an all Oxford Brookes crew.

== International representative career ==
Brightmore made his international representative debut for Great Britain in a coxed four which rowed to an overall fourth placing at the 2014 U23 World Rowing Championships. In 2015 and 2016 he coxed the British U23 men's eight at those years' U23 World Championships. His first senior national representative appearance was under the canvas of the GB men's coxed pair at the 2017 World Rowing Championships.

It was 2022 when Brightmore took hold of the rudder ropes in the GB men's senior eight and that same year he became a world champion when that crew won the eights title at the 2022 World Rowing Championships. He had earlier won gold that season at the 2022 European Rowing Championships.

At the 2023 World Rowing Championships in Belgrade, he won a second World Championship gold medal in the men's eight.

He won a gold medal as part of the Great Britain eight at the 2024 Summer Olympics.
