= Jacob van de Kerkhof =

Dutch rower (born 1995)

Personal information
- Born: 12 October 1995 (age 30)

Sport
- Country: Netherlands
- Sport: Rowing

Achievements and titles
- Olympic finals: Paris 2024 M8+
Medal record
Men's rowing
Representing the Netherlands
Olympic Games
Silver medal – second place	2024 Paris	Eight
World Championships
Silver medal – second place	2023 Belgrade	Eight
Silver medal – second place	2022 Racice	Eight
European Championships
Bronze medal – third place	2023 Bled	Eight
Silver medal – second place	2022 Munich	Eight

Jacob van de Kerkhof (born 12 October 1995) is a Dutch rower. He won a silver medal in the men's eight at the 2024 Summer Olympics.

== Career ==
He won silver medal in the men's eight at the 2022 European Rowing Championships in Munich. He won a silver medal at the 2022 World Rowing Championships in the men's eight, in the Czech Republic.

He won a silver medal in the men's eight at the 2023 European Rowing Championships in Bled, Slovenia. He won a silver medal in the men's eight at the 2023 World Rowing Championships in Belgrade.

He won a silver medal in the men's eight at the 2024 Summer Olympics in Paris.

== Personal life ==
He is completing a doctorate from the University of Utrecht, studying the freedom of expression on social media platforms within the context of the Digital Services Act.
