= Benedict Eggeling =

German rower (born 1999)

Personal information
- Born: 16 February 1999 (age 27)

Sport
- Country: Germany
- Sport: Rowing

Achievements and titles
- Olympic finals: Paris 2024 M8+
Medal record
Men's rowing
Representing the Germany
European Championships
Silver medal – second place	2024 Szeged	Eight
Silver medal – second place	2026 Varese	Mixed eight
Bronze medal – third place	2026 Varese	Coxless four

Benedict Eggeling (born 16 February 1999) is a German rower. He competed at the 2024 Paris Olympics.

== Early and personal life ==
From Eschwege, he played handball and competed in handball before focusing on rowing. He was a member of Eschwege Rowing Club from the age of nine years old, and as a teenager he won bronze in the 3000 metres long-distance single scull race at the national competition in Wolfsburg. In 2014, Eggeling moved to Bedford School in England. In 2017, he returned to Germany, and lived in Hamburg before later being based in Dortmund. He attended the University of Münster.

== Career ==
He won gold in Duisburg at the 2020 European Rowing U23 Championships in the men’s eight. He won a bronze medal in the men’s eight at the 2021 World Rowing U23 Championships in the Czech Republic. He was a bronze medal winner in the men's 8 at Luzern in 2022 in the Rowing World Cup.

He won a silver medal at the 2024 European Rowing Championships in Szeged. He competed in the men's eight at the 2024 Summer Olympics in Paris.

He was selected for the German eight for the 2025 European Rowing Championships.
