= 2020 European Rowing U23 Championships =

- Venue: Rowing Course
- Location: Duisburg, Germany
- Dates: 5–6 September
- Nations: 32

The 4th European Rowing U23 Championships was the 4th edition and was held from 5 to 6 September 2020 at the Sportpark Duisburg in Duisburg, Germany.

== Results ==
=== Medal summary ===
Rank	Nation	Gold	Silver	Bronze	Total
1	Italy (ITA)	5	6	3	14
2	Romania (ROU)	5	3	2	10
3	Germany (GER)	4	5	6	15
4	Greece (GRE)	2	1	2	5
4	Ireland (IRL)	2	1	2	5
6	France (FRA)	2	0	2	4
7	Czech Republic (CZE)	1	1	0	2
8	Belgium (BEL)	1	0	0	1
9	Netherlands (NED)	0	2	1	3
10	Belarus (BLR)	0	1	0	1
10	Croatia (CRO)	0	1	0	1
10	Portugal (POR)	0	1	0	1
13	Russia (RUS)	0	0	2	2
14	Slovenia (SLO)	0	0	1	1
14	Spain (ESP)	0	0	1	1
Totals (15 entries)		22	22	22	66

=== Men ===
Event	Gold		Silver		Bronze	
BLM1x	Italy; Niels Torre	07:00.07	Czech Republic; Jan Cincibuch	07:03.02	Greece; Antonios Papakonstantinou	07:08.19
BLM2-	Italy; Simone Mantegazza; Simone Fasoli	06:52.19	Portugal; Tomás Barreto; Simão Simões	06:57.51	Germany; Marcel Gallien; Mirko Rahn	06:59.32
BLM2x	Belgium; Tibo Vyvey; Marlon Colpaert	06:26.86	Germany; Nikita Mohr; Melvin Mueller-Ruchholtz	06:30.92	France; Paul Tixier; Ferdinand Ludwig	06:31.38
BLM4x	France; Pierrick Verger; Baptiste Savaete; Corentin Amet; Florian Ludwig	06:04.97	Italy; Alessandro Benzoni; Patrick Rocek; Giulio Acernese; Alberto Zamariola	06:06.70	Germany; Finn Wolter; Johannes Thein; Fabio Kress; Joscha Holl	06:07.07
BM1x	Italy; Nicolò Carucci	07:00.04	Germany; Moritz Wolff	07:00.89	Romania; Mihai Chiruță	07:01.81
BM2-	Romania; Dumitru Ciobîcă; Florin Lehaci	06:31.59	Croatia; Patrik Lončarić; Anton Lončarić	06:33.38	Slovenia; Jaka Čas; Nik Krebs	06:38.16
BM2x	Ireland; Daire Lynch; Ronan Byrne	06:23.56	Belarus; Yahor Shliupski; Ivan Brynza	06:27.49	Spain; Iván Rico Castro; Aleix García Pujolar	06:29.17
BM4-	Romania; Florin Arteni; Mugurel Semciuc; Stefan Berariu; Cosmin Pascari	05:56.64	Italy; Volodymyr Kuflyk; Edoardo Lanzavecchia; Alessandro Bonamoneta; Nunzio Di Colandrea	06.00.10	Greece; Leonidas Palaiopanos; Ioannis Kalandaridis; Zisis Boukouvalas; Athanasios Palaiopanos	06:00.96
BM4+	Germany; Paul Dohrmann; Robin Göritz; Henning Köncke; Julius Christ; Till Martini (Cox)	06:10.47	Italy; Matteo Della Valle; Aniello Sabbatino; Jacopo Frigerio; Davide Comini; Filippo Wiesenfeld (Cox)	06:12.35	Ireland; Alex Byrne; Ross Corrigan; Jack Dorney; John Kearney; Leah O'Regan (Cox)	06:12.99
BM4x	Czech Republic; Václav Baldrián; Marek Diblík; Tomáš Šišma; Filip Zima	06:01.14	Italy; Riccardo Mattana; Gustavo Ferrio; Lorenzo Gaione; Emanuele Giarri	06:02.06	Germany; Aaron Erfanian; Paul Berghoff; Franz Werner; Anton Finger	06:02.49
BM8+	Germany; Mark Hinrichs; Benjamin Leibelt; Benedict Eggeling; Floyd Benedikter; Ole Kruse; Mattes Schoenherr; Julian Garth; Jasper Angl; Florian Koch (Cox)	05:44.40	Romania; Gheorghe Morar; Constantin Hîrgău; George Cătruna; Nicu-Iulian Chelaru; Bogdan Sabin Băițoc; Marian Cireaşă; Florin Arteni; Ciprian Huc; Petre-Florin Enăşescu (Cox)	05:47.62	Italy; Edoardo Benini; Luca Armani; Marco Felici; Andrea Carando; Davide Verità; Antonio Cascone; Paolo Covini; Giovanni Codato; Emanuele Capponi (Cox)	05:48.60

=== Women ===
Event	Gold		Silver		Bronze	
BLW1x	Greece; Evangelia Anastasiadou	07:49.51	Netherlands; Femke van de Vliet	07:51.90	Italy; Greta Martinelli	07:54.08
BLW2-	Ireland; Cliodhna Nolan; Lydia Heaphy	07:30.83	Germany; Luisa Simon; Antonia Michaels	07:35.90	Italy; Sofia Tanghetti; Isabella Mondini	07:41.33
BLW2x	Italy; Giulia Mignemi; Silvia Crosio	06:58.68	Ireland; Aoife Casey; Margaret Cremen	07:04.49	Germany; Luise Asmussen; Cosima Clotten	07:11.27
BLW4x	Italy; Sara Borghi; Bianca Saffirio; Ilaria Corazza; Arianna Passini	06:42.68	Germany; Cecilia Sommerfeld; Pia Leonie Otto; Natalie Weber; Antonia Wuerich	06:45.07	France; Fanny Puybaraud; Ines Boccanfuso; Loanne Guivarc h Aurelie Morizot	06:49.99
BW1x	Greece; Anneta Kyridou	07:39.60	Germany; Alexandra Foester	07:41.93	Russia; Anastasiia Liubich	07:50.04
BW2-	Romania; Adriana Ailincai; Alina-Maria Baletchi	07:08.80	Greece; Maria Kyridou; Christina Bourmpou	07:10.41	Ireland; Tara Hanlon; Emily Hegarty	07:15.92
BW2x	Romania; Nicoleta-Ancuta Bodnar; Simona Geanina Radis	07:08.47	Italy; Clara Guerra; Alessandra Montesano	07:17.31	Germany; Lisa Gutfleisch; Marie-Sophie Zeidler	07:22.75
BW4-	Romania; Andreea Popa; Maria Tivodariu; Maria-Magdalena Rusu; Dumitrita Juncanariu	06:44.31	Italy; Khadija Alajdi el Idrissi; Benedetta Faravelli; Veronica Bumbaca; Giorgia Pelacchi	06:44.31	Netherlands; Lisa Goossens; Iris Klok; Susanna Temming; Eve Stewart	06:46.08
BW4+	France; Maya Cornut; Adele Brosse; Pauline Rossignol; Emma Cornelis; Elsa Taboulet (Cox)	06:56.75	Romania; Damaris Lebada; Alexandra Ungureanu; Laura Pal; Vasilica-Alexandra Rusu; Victoria-Stefania Petreanu (Cox)	07:02.41	Germany; Paula Rossen; Marie Markhoff; Anna Kracklauer; Chiara Kracklauer; Annalena fisch (Cox)	07:05.79
BW4x	Germany; Lena Osterkamp; Maren Voelz; Tabea Kuhnert; Sophie Leupold	06:39.21	Netherlands; Nika Vos; Lisa Bruijnincx; Jacobien Van westreenen Femke Paulis	06:41.58	Romania; Larisa Elena Rosu; Cristina Drugă; Andrea-Ioana Budeanu; Georgiana-Simona Tataru	06:43.65
BW8+	Germany; Sarjana Klamp; Clara Oberdorfer; Annika Weber; Lisa Holbrook; Annabelle Bachmann; Lea Dahn; Katarina Tkachenko; Katja Fuhrmann; Neele Erdtmann (Cox)	06:27.36	Romania; Lorena Constantin; Ioana-Madalina Morosan; Madalina-Gabriela Casu; Iuliana Timoc; Ioana-Irina Acsinte; Roxana-Iuliana Anghel; Amalia Bucu; Raluca-Georgiana Dinulescu; Victoria-Stefania Petreanu (Cox)	06:28.59	Russia; Anna Kovtun; Elena Zakhvatova; Sofiia Budanova; Anastasiia Bazhenova; Marina Rubtsova; Daria Kukushkina; Elena Daniliuk; Elena Shapurova; Alla Neustroeva (Cox)	06:30.96
