= Olav Molenaar =

Dutch rower (born 1999)

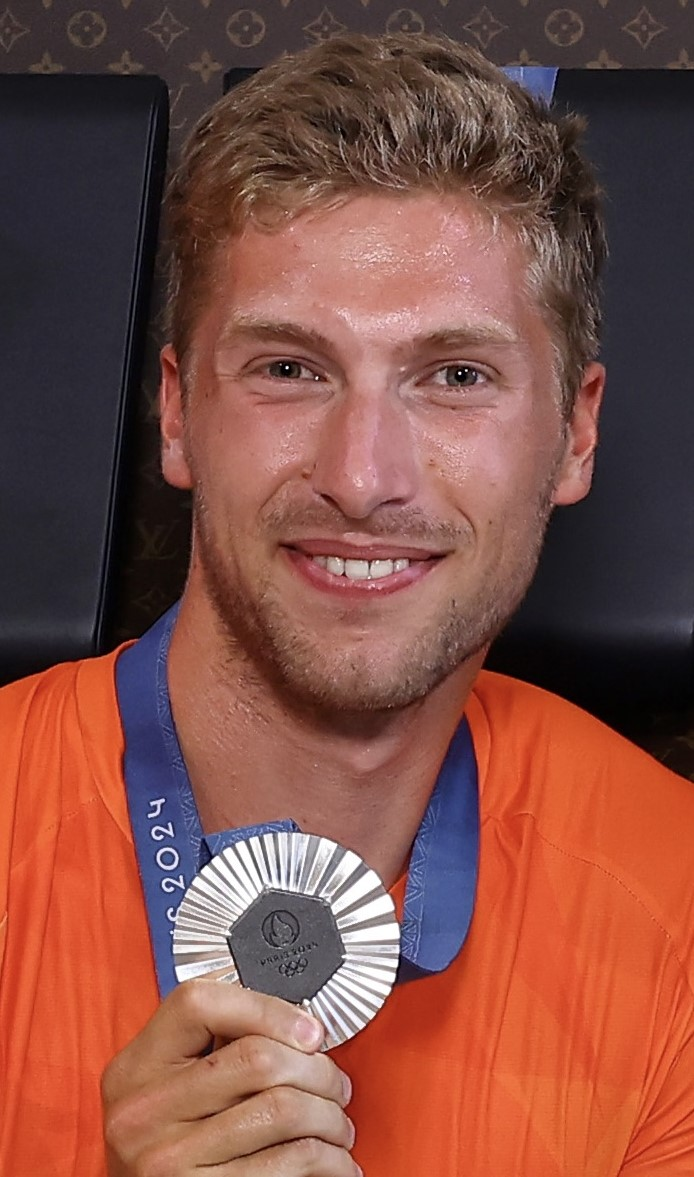

Personal information
- Born: 28 March 1999 (age 27)

Sport
- Country: Netherlands
- Sport: Rowing

Achievements and titles
- Olympic finals: Paris 2024 M8+
Medal record
Men's rowing
Representing the Netherlands
Olympic Games
Silver medal – second place	2024 Paris	Eight
World Championships
Silver medal – second place	2023 Belgrade	Eight
European Championships
Silver medal – second place	2025 Plovdiv	Eight
Silver medal – second place	2023 Bled	M4-

Olav Molenaar (born 28 March 1999) is a Dutch rower. He competed at the 2024 Paris Olympics, winning a silver medal in the men's eight.

== Early and personal life ==
From Zaandam, he started rowing at his local club ZZV Zaandam at a young age. He later moved to Het Spaarne. His father Johan, mother Joy and sister Myrrith are all active members of the Zaanse club. He attended the University of California, Berkeley.

== Career ==
He won a silver medal in the coxless four at the 2023 European Rowing Championships in Bled, Slovenia.

He won a silver medal in the men's eight at the 2023 World Rowing Championships in Belgrade.

He competed in the men's eight at the 2024 Summer Olympics, winning the silver medal.

He was selected for the Dutch eight for the 2025 European Rowing Championships.
