= Ben Canham =

Australian rower (born 1997)

Personal information
- Nationality: Australian
- Born: 28 June 1997 (age 28)

Sport
- Country: Australia
- Sport: Rowing
- Club: Mercantile Rowing Club
Medal record
Men's rowing
Representing Australia
World Championships
Bronze medal – third place	2022 Račice	Eight
Bronze medal – third place	2023 Belgrade	Eight
U23 World Championships
Gold medal – first place	2019 Sarasota	M4+

Benjamin Canham (born 28 June 1997) is an Australian representative rower. He was an U23 world champion in 2019 and has also represented at senior World Championships. He won a bronze medal at the 2022 World Championships.

== Club and state rowing ==
Canham was educated at Brighton Grammar School in Melbourne where he took up rowing. His Australian senior club rowing has been from the Mercantile Rowing Club in Melbourne.

He first made state selection for Victoria in the 2017 men's youth eight which contested the Noel Wilkinson Trophy at the Interstate Regatta within the Australian Rowing Championships. In 2021 he moved into the Victorian senior men's eight which contested and won the King's Cup at the Interstate Regatta. Canham also raced in the 2022 and 2023 Victorian King's Cup eights.

== International representative rowing ==
Canham made his Australian representative debut in a coxed four at the 2019 U23 World Rowing Championships in Sarasota Florida. That crew led their final from start to finish and were crowned as world champions. Canham was selected in the Australian team for the 2022 international season and the 2022 World Rowing Championships. He rowed in the three seat of the Australian men's eight to silver medal placings at both of the World Rowing Cups in 2022. At the 2022 World Rowing Championships at Racize, Canham rowed in the four seat of the eight. The crew won through their repechage to make the A final where they raced to a third place and a World Championship bronze medal.

In March 2023 Canham was again selected in the Australian senior men's sweep-oar squad for the 2023 international season. At the Rowing World Cup II in Varese Italy, Canham raced in the Australian men's eight. In the final after a slow start they rowed through most of the field and took second place and a silver medal. At 2023's RWC III in Lucerne, Canham again rowed in the Australian men's eight. In the final they rowed stroke for stroke with their fancied Great Britain rivals but then moved away at the 1000m mark and held on for a gold medal victory. For the 2023 World Rowing Championships in Belgrade Serbia, the Australian men's eight was left unchanged and Holt again raced in the three seat. They won their heat powering past the USA eight who had headed them at the 1000m mark. In the A final Australia and Great Britain traded the lead over the first 1000m, but beyond that point the result mirrored that of 2022 with Great Britain exerting dominance by the 1500m, fighting off a fast finishing Dutch eight who took silver and leaving the Australians with the bronze for the second successive year.
