= Gennaro Di Mauro =

Italian rower

Personal information
- Full name: Gennaro Alberto Di Mauro
- Nationality: Italy
- Born: 8 November 2001 (age 24) Massa di Somma, Italy
- Height: 2.10 m (6 ft 11 in)

Sport
- Sport: Rowing
- Club: University of California, Berkeley; University of Oxford

Gennaro Alberto Di Mauro (born 8 November 2001) is an Italian rower. He competed in the Tokyo 2020 Summer Olympics, in single sculls, and in the Paris 2024 Summer Olympics, in the men's eight. In 2022, he set a world indoor record over 6000 m.

== Career ==
In 2017, he participated in the junior world championships, finishing fifth.

In 2018, he participated at the European junior championships, at the junior world championships. At the Italian indoor rowing championships he set the new Italian junior record on the 2000 m rowing.

In 2019, he finished fourth at the Junior World Championships.

In 2022, he set a new world indoor record for 6000 m.

Di Mauro rowed for the University of California crew.

In 2026, he represented the University of Oxford at the Head of the Charles Regatta.
