= Laurits Follert =

German rower (born 1996)

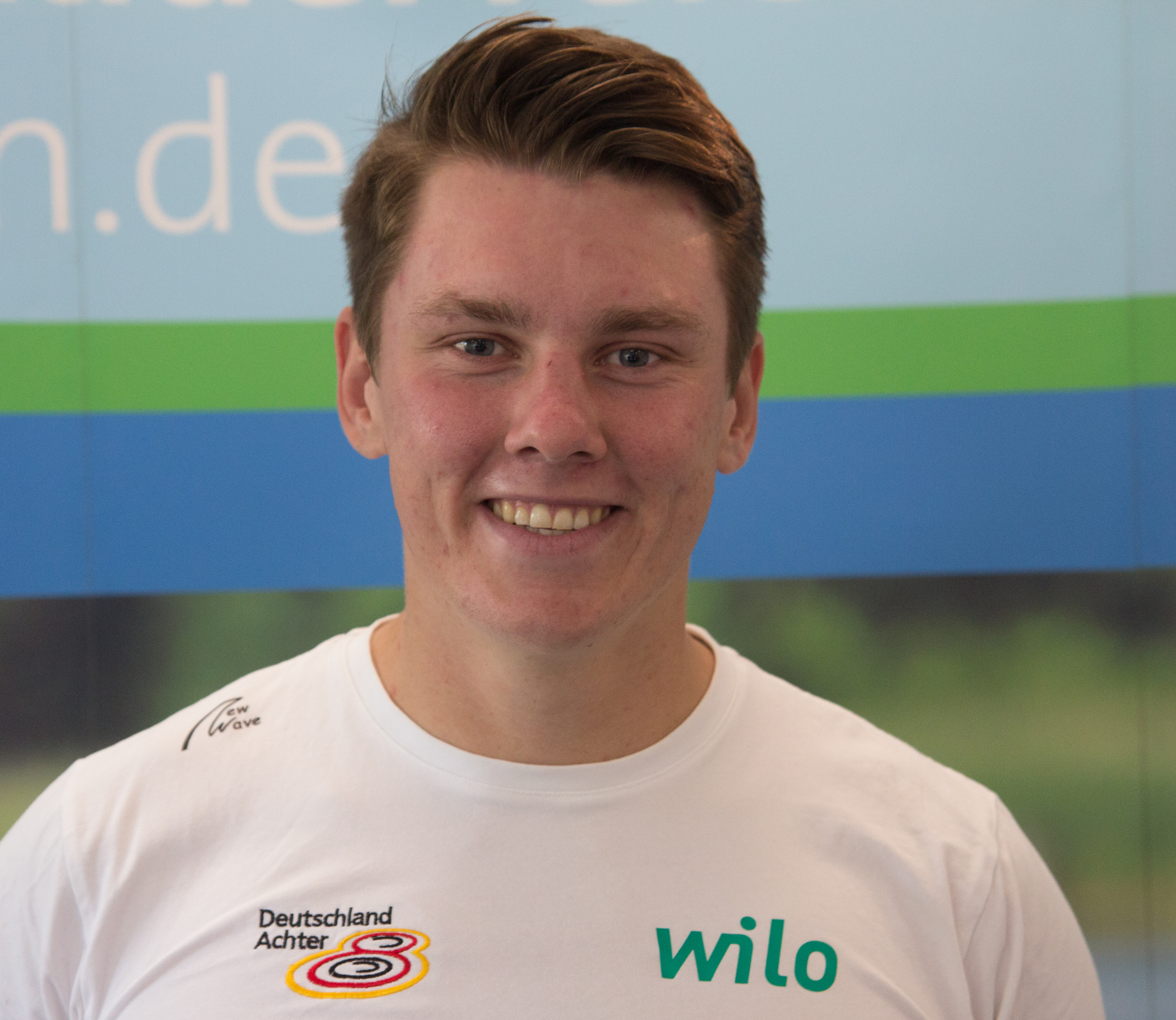

Personal information
- Nationality: German
- Born: 10 April 1996 (age 30) Duisburg, Germany
- Height: 1.94 m (6 ft 4 in)
- Weight: 93 kg (205 lb)

Sport
- Country: Germany
- Sport: Rowing
- Event: Eight
- Club: Crefelder Ruder-Club 1883 e.V.
Medal record
Men's rowing
Representing Germany
Olympic Games
Silver medal – second place	2020 Tokyo	Eight
World Championships
Gold medal – first place	2019 Ottensheim	Eight
European Championships
Silver medal – second place	2024 Szeged	Eight

Laurits Follert (born 10 April 1996) is a German representative rower - a world champion and an Olympic silver medallist. He won a 2019 world championship as a member of the German men's eight who took gold at the 2019 World Rowing Championships in Ottensheim, Austria.

== Early rowing career ==
Follert's club rowing has been from the Crefelder Rowing Club 1883 ev in Krefeld in North Rhine-Westphalia.

== International rowing career ==
Follert's representative debut for Germany came in 2013 when he was selected to row in the men's eight at the World Junior Rowing Championships at Lithuania. That crew rowed to a first placing and a junior world championship. In 2014 Follert was selected to row in a junior German men's pair which placed a fourth at the 2014 Junior World Championships.

2015 saw Follert move into the German U23 men's eight which took the gold medal at the World U23 Rowing Championships and then placed third in 2016 at the U23 World Championships in Rotterdam.

Follert in 2017 was elevated to the German senior squad and a coxless four which competed at World Rowing Cups and took sixth place at the 2017 World Rowing Championships. That same four went to the 2016 European Championships and placed seventh. In 2018 he moved into a coxless pair which raced at the World Rowing Cups and the European Championships but he did not race for Germany at the World Championships that year.

In 2019 the German men's eight were defending their two successive world championship titles. Follert managed to unseat Felix Wimberger and moved into the two seat for their successful international season culminating in their third straight world championship title at the 2019 World Rowing Championships in Ottensheim. Their 2019 performances qualified that boat for Tokyo 2020. By the time of the 2021 selections for those delayed Olympics, Follerts was still in the crew and set to make his Olympic rowing debut. At that Tokyo 2021 Olympic regatta he rowed at two in the German eight to an Olympic silver medal.
