= Constantin Adam =

Romanian rower (born 1996)

Personal information
- Born: 12 July 1996 (age 30) Călărași, Romania

Sport
- Country: Romania
- Sport: Rowing
Medal record
Representing Romania
European Championships
Gold medal – first place	2026 Varese	Eight
Silver medal – second place	2021 Varese	Eight
Bronze medal – third place	2024 Szeged	Eight

Constantin Adam (born 12 July 1996) is a Romanian rower. He competed in the men's coxless four event at the 2016 Summer Olympics.
