= Alexandru Chioseaua =

Romanian rower

Personal information
- Full name: Alexandru Petrișor Chioseaua
- Nationality: Romanian
- Born: 29 September 1997 (age 27); Slobozia, Romania

Sport
- Sport: Rowing

Alexandru Petrișor Chioseaua (born 29 September 1997) is a Romanian rower. He competed in the men's eight event at the 2020 Summer Olympics.
