= Emanuele Gaetani Liseo =

Italian rower (born 1996)

Personal information
- Born: 22 November 1996 (age 29) Palermo, Italy

Sport
- Country: Italy
- Sport: Rowing
- Club: Telimar
Medal record
European Championships
Bronze medal – third place	2022 Munich	Eight

Emanuele Gaetani Liseo (born 22 November 1996) is an Italian rower who won a bronze medal at the 2022 European Rowing Championships.
