= Olaf Roggensack =

German rower

Personal information
- Nationality: German
- Born: 29 May 1997 (age 29)

Sport
- Sport: Rowing
Medal record
Men's rowing
Representing Germany
Olympic Games
Silver medal – second place	2020 Tokyo	Eight
European Championships
Silver medal – second place	2024 Szeged	Eight
Silver medal – second place	2026 Varese	Eight

Olaf Roggensack (born 29 May 1997) is a German rower. He competed in the men's eight event at the 2020 Summer Olympics where he won an Olympic silver medal. He has been twice a junior world champion.

== Junior rowing ==
Roggensack made his first international appearance for Germany in the coxless four selected for the 2014 World Rowing Junior Championships. The crew won all three of their races and a world junior title. The next year, he competed in the coxless pair at the 2015 World Rowing Junior Championships and was again undefeated in all races, winning his second junior world championship title.

== Senior international rowing ==
In 2020 Roggensack was the only new man added to the well-established German senior men's eight—the Deutschlandachter—when he replaced Christopher Reinhardt in the three seat. Roggensack was in the crew for the 2020 European Championship victory and then held his seat for their Tokyo Olympics campaign in 2021. He rowed in the eight at the 2021 European Championships, two 2021 World Rowing Cups and then at the Tokyo Olympics where they won their heat. In the Olympic final as favourites they led at the 500m mark but the unfancied New Zealand crew took a lead at the halfway point and couldn't be headed. The German eight with Roggensack in the three seat finished the regatta with an Olympic silver medal.
