= Ștefan Berariu =

Romanian rower (born 1999)

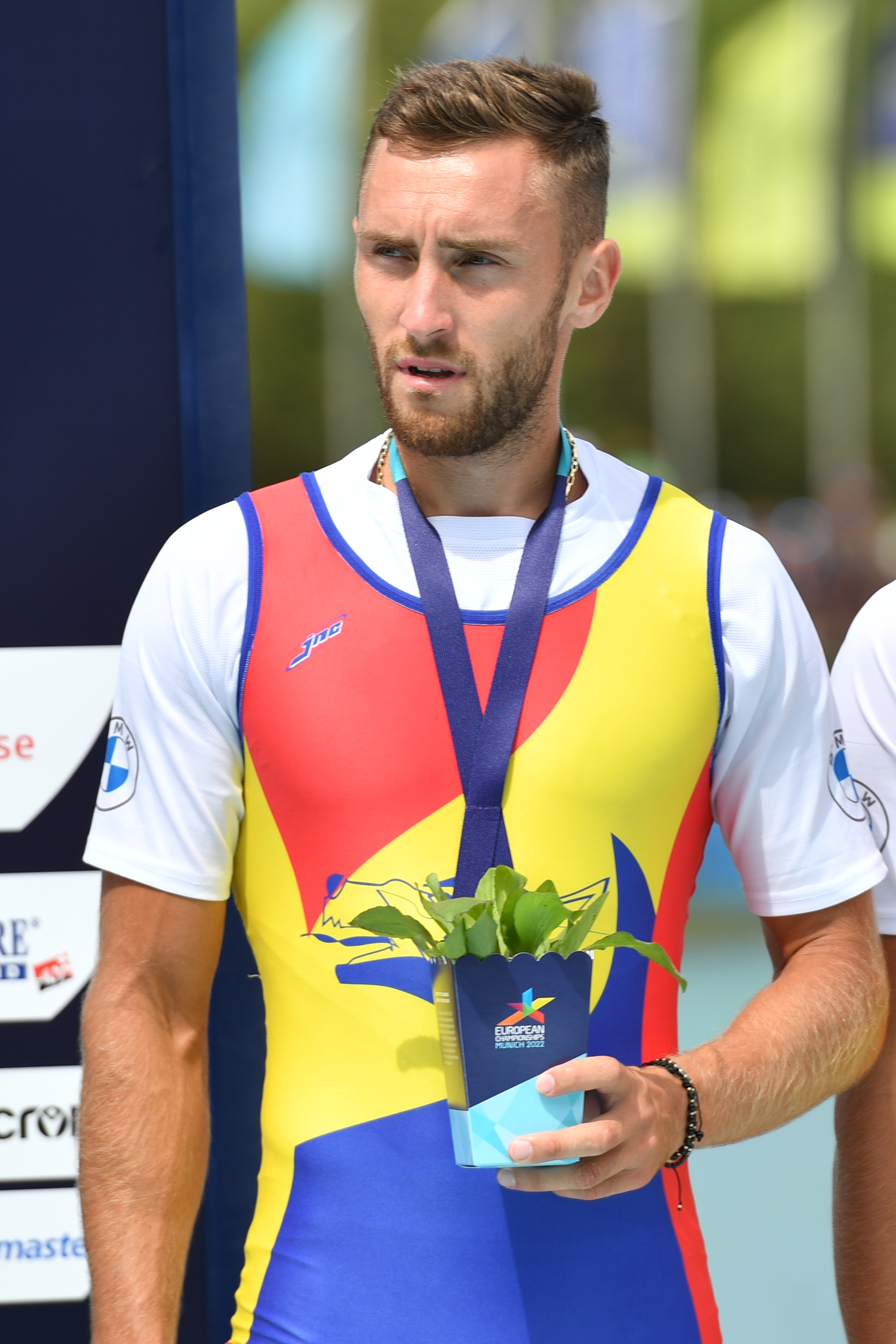
- Berariu in 2022

Personal information
- Full name: Ștefan Constantin Berariu
- Nationality: Romanian
- Born: 14 January 1999 (age 27) Dumbrăveni, Suceava, Romania
- Education: University of Craiova
- Height: 190 cm (6 ft 3 in)

Sport
- Country: Romania
- Sport: Rowing
- Event: Coxless four
- Club: CS Dinamo Bucuresti
- Coached by: Antonio Colamonici; Dorin Alupei
Medal record
Men's rowing
Representing Romania
Olympic Games
Silver medal – second place	2020 Tokyo	Coxless four
World Championships
Gold medal – first place	2025 Shanghai	Mixed eight
Gold medal – first place	2026 Amsterdam	Mixed eight
Silver medal – second place	2019 Ottensheim	Coxless four
Silver medal – second place	2025 Shanghai	Coxless four
European Championships U23
Gold medal – first place	2019 Ioannina	Coxless four
Gold medal – first place	2020 Duisburg	Coxless four
Gold medal – first place	2021 Kruszwica	Coxless four
European Championships
Gold medal – first place	2018 Glasgow	Coxless four
Gold medal – first place	2026 Varese	Coxless pair
Gold medal – first place	2026 Varese	Mixed eight
Silver medal – second place	2021 Varese	Coxless four
Silver medal – second place	2023 Bled	Eight
Bronze medal – third place	2022 Oberschleißheim	Coxless four
Bronze medal – third place	2024 Szeged	Eight
World Junior Championships
Gold medal – first place	2016 Rotterdam	Coxless four
Silver medal – second place	2017 Trakai	Coxless pair

Ștefan Constantin Berariu (born 14 January 1999) is a Romanian rower. Competing in coxless fours he won silver medals at the 2020 Summer Olympics, 2021 European Championships and 2019 World Rowing Championships and Gold medal at the 2019 European Rowing U23 Championships, 2020 European Rowing U23 Championships and 2021 European Rowing U23 Championships.
