= Vincenzo Abbagnale =

Italian rower (born 1993)

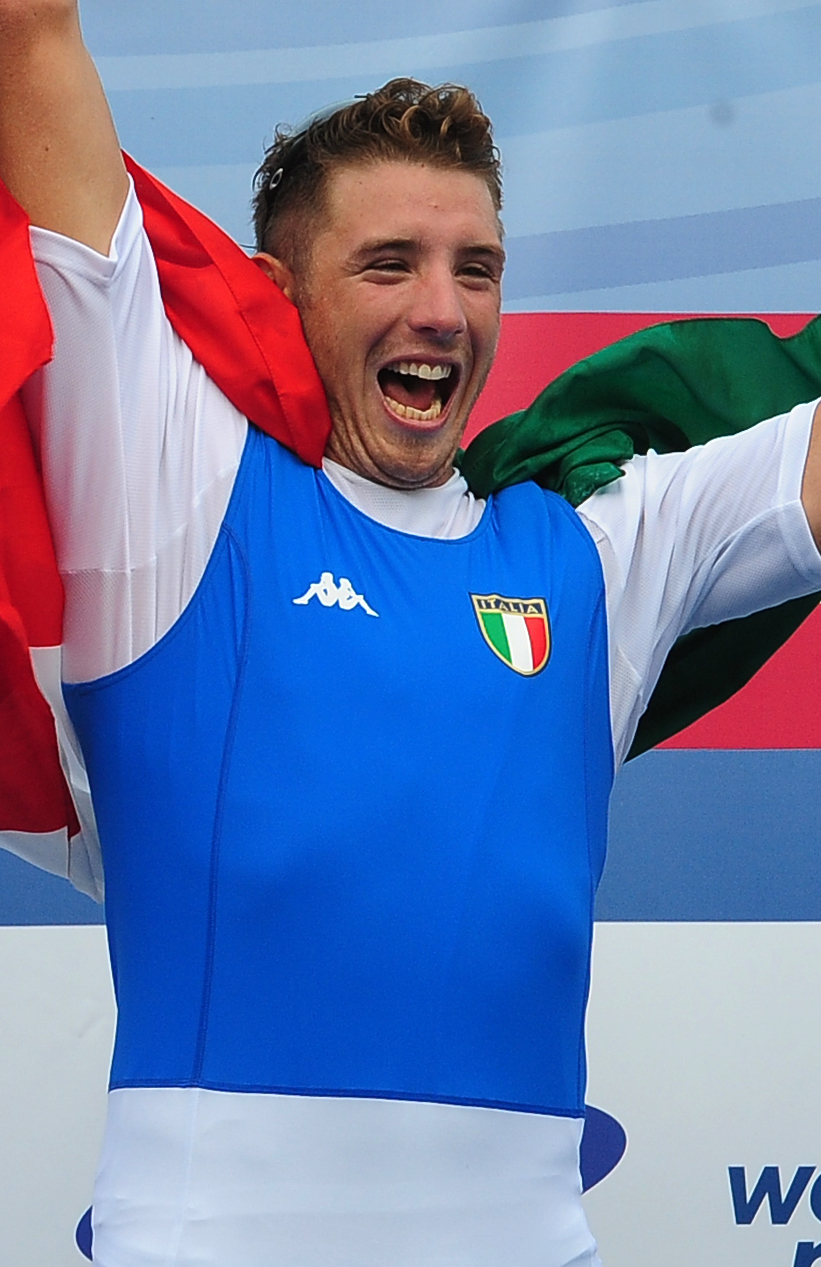

Personal information
- Born: 13 March 1993 (age 33) Scafati, Italy
- Height: 1.85 m (6 ft 1 in)
- Weight: 85 kg (187 lb)

Sport
- Sport: Rowing
- Club: G.S. Marina Militare
Medal record
Men's rowing
Representing Italy
World Championships
| Gold medal – first place | 2013 Chungju | Coxed pair |
European Championships
| Bronze medal – third place | 2022 Munich | Eight |

Vincenzo Abbagnale (born 13 March 1993) is an Italian rower. He is the son of Giuseppe Abbagnale. He won the gold medal at the 2013 World Championships. He competed at the 2020 Summer Olympics.

Vincenzo Abbagnale is an athlete of the Gruppo Sportivo della Marina Militare.

== See also ==
- Abbagnale brothers
