= Leonardo Pietra Caprina =

Italian rower

Personal information
- Born: 25 September 1997 (age 28) Milan, Italy
- Height: 1.90
- Weight: 90

Sport
- Country: Italy
- Sport: Rowing
- Club: Canottieri Firenze
Medal record
World Championships
Bronze medal – third place	2017 Sarasota	Eight
European Championships
Bronze medal – third place	2022 Munich	Eight

Leonardo Pietra Caprina (born 25 September 1997) is an Italian rower who won a bronze medal at the 2017 World Rowing Championships and 2022 European Rowing Championships in the eight.
