= Ciprian Huc =

Romanian rower

Personal information
- Nationality: Romanian
- Born: 8 April 1999 (age 27)

Sport
- Sport: Rowing
Medal record
Men's rowing
Representing Romania
World Junior Championships
Bronze medal – third place	2017 Trakai	Coxless four

Ciprian Huc (born 8 April 1999) is a Romanian rower. He competed in the men's eight event at the 2020 Summer Olympics.
