= Adrian Munteanu =

Romanian rower

Munteanu Adrian Petre
Personal information
- Nationality: Romanian
- Born: 13 October 1997 (age 28) Orșova, Romania

Sport
- Sport: Rowing

Achievements and titles
- Olympic finals: 5 place Paris 2024 M8+ & 7 place Tokyo 2020 M8+
Medal record
Men's rowing
Representing Romania
European Championships
Gold medal – first place	2022 Oberschleißheim	Eight
Silver medal – second place	2023 Bled	Eight
Silver medal – second place	2021 Varese	Eight
Silver medal – second place	2020 Poznań	Eight
Bronze medal – third place	2018 Glasgow	Eight
Bronze medal – third place	2024 Szeged	Eight

Adrian Munteanu (born 13 October 1997) is a Romanian rower. He competed in the men's eight event at the 2020 Summer Olympics.
