= European Rowing U23 Championships =

Continental rowing event

- Status: Active
- Genre: Sports Event
- Date: Midyear
- Frequency: Annual
- Location: Europe
- Inaugurated: 2017
- Organiser: FISA

The European Rowing U23 Championships is an international rowing regatta organized by FISA (International Rowing Federation). It is a week-long event for rowers under 23 years old at the end of the calendar year in which the event takes place.

== History ==
The inaugural championship took place in September 2017. European Member National Federations are eligible to compete.

== Events ==
Number	Events	Gold	Silver	Bronze	Total
1 - 2017	21	21	21	20	62
2 - 2018	22	22	22	21	65
3 - 2019	22	22	22	22	66
4 - 2020	22	22	22	22	66
5 - 2021	22	22	22	21	65
6 - 2022	21	21	19	18	58
7 - 2023	21	21	21	16	58
Total		151	149	140	440

== Editions ==
#	Year	Host City	Host Country	Dates	Nations	Events	Ref
1	2017	Kruszwica	Poland	2–3 September	30	21	
2	2018	Brest	Belarus	1–2 September	25	22	
3	2019	Ioannina	Greece	7–8 September	30	22	
4	2020	Duisburg	Germany	5–6 September	32	22	
5	2021	Kruszwica	Poland	4–5 September	30	22	
6	2022	Heindonk	Belgium	3–4 September	30	21	
7	2023	Krefeld	Germany	26–27 August	27	21	
8	2024	Edirne	Turkey	7–8 September		22	
9	2025	Račice	Czech Republic	6–7 September		22	
10	2026	Kruszwica	Poland	6–7 September	28	18	

== Medals (2017–2023) ==
Rank	Nation	Gold	Silver	Bronze	Total
1	Romania (ROU)	48	15	5	68
2	Germany (GER)	16	16	20	52
3	Greece (GRE)	15	9	8	32
4	Italy (ITA)	14	15	8	37
5	Switzerland (SUI)	8	9	8	25
6	Poland (POL)	6	14	8	28
7	Belarus (BLR)	5	13	3	21
8	Czech Republic (CZE)	5	7	5	17
9	Bulgaria (BUL)	4	4	1	9
10	Turkey (TUR)	4	3	1	8
11	Belgium (BEL)	4	0	3	7
12	Hungary (HUN)	3	5	7	15
13	Great Britain (GBR)	3	4	13	20
14	Russia (RUS)	3	4	10	17
15	Lithuania (LTU)	3	3	3	9
16	Ireland (IRL)	3	2	2	7
17	France (FRA)	2	2	3	7
18	Denmark (DEN)	2	0	2	4
19	Austria (AUT)	1	4	6	11
20	Croatia (CRO)	1	4	3	8
21	Norway (NOR)	1	2	1	4
22	Ukraine (UKR)	0	8	6	14
23	Netherlands (NED)	0	2	1	3
24	Slovenia (SLO)	0	1	3	4
25	Portugal (POR)	0	1	2	3
26	Serbia (SRB)	0	1	1	2
26	Slovakia (SVK)	0	1	1	2
28	Moldova (MDA)	0	0	3	3
29	Sweden (SWE)	0	0	2	2
30	Spain (ESP)	0	0	1	1
Totals (30 entries)		151	149	140	440

== See also ==
- European Rowing Championships
- European Rowing U19 Championships
- World Rowing U23 Championships
