= Miles Beeson =

British Rower (born 2001)

Personal information
- National team: GB Rowing Team
- Citizenship: British
- Born: 21 January 2001 (age 25)
- Home town: Aberdeen, Scotland
- Education: Albyn School; Yale University
- Occupations: Rower; Founder – F&S; Business Development – Ebar
- Height: 6 ft 7 in (201 cm)
- Weight: 210 lb (95 kg) – 2022
- Life partner: Raime Jones (Engaged)
- Relatives: Alexander Beeson (Brother); Zoe Beeson (Sister)
- Website: feathernsquare.com

Sport
- Country: Great Britain
- Sport: Rowing
- Events: Eight; Coxless Four; Coxless Pair
- University team: Yale Men's Crew (Heavyweight)
- Club: Aberdeen Schools Rowing Association; Molesey Boat Club; Leander Club; Aberdeen Boat Club
Medal record
Men's rowing
Representing Great Britain
World Championships
Silver medal – second place	2025 Shanghai	Eight
Silver medal – second place	2026 Amsterdam	Eight
European Championships
Gold medal – first place	2025 Plovdiv	Eight
U23 World Championships
Gold medal – first place	2023 Plovdiv	Coxless Pair
Gold medal – first place	2022 Varese	Coxless Four
Gold medal – first place	2021 Račice	Eight
Junior World Championships
Silver medal – second place	2019 Tokyo	Coxless Four

Miles Beeson (born 21 January 2001) is a British rower from Aberdeen, Scotland. He is a European champion and three-time U23 world champion. He is also the founder of Feather & Square, a hand-care brand for rowers.

== Early life and education ==
Beeson grew up in Aberdeen and attended Albyn School. He went to Yale University from 2018 to 2023 and studied Political Science and Economics, and International Relations and Affairs.

== Rowing career ==
=== Junior career ===
Beeson first start took up rowing in 2013 at the Aberdeen Schools Rowing Association (ASRA), after his mother signed him up for a summer course for beginners. In 2018 he won the National Schools Regatta in a pair with fellow Aberdonian Robert Powell.

For his first international vest, Beeson was selected to race the eight in the 2016 GB vs France Match. He was one of four ASRA rowers to be selected, alongside rowers from Eton College Boat Club. They caught a crab off the start which left France with the lead, but chased down the French over 1500m to win by a significant margin.

Beeson was a member of the Scottish junior men's team, and competed at the 2016 Home International Regatta in Cardiff Bay, Wales. He raced in the pair with Robert Powell, and in the eight, finishing third and fourth, respectively.

In 2017 Beeson was selected for the GB team at the Coupe de la Jeunesse in the eight. On Saturday he came 3rd, and on Sunday he won. Beeson was the first ASRA athlete to win a medal at the Coupe since 2000.

Beeson competed twice at the Junior World Rowing Championships, in 2018 and 2019. In 2018 he raced the pair with Robert Powell, and came 1st in B final, 7th overall. In Tokyo in 2019 he switched to the coxless four, finishing second, alongside crewmates Felix Rawlinson, Joseph Middleton, and Oliver Parish.

=== U23 career ===
Miles Beeson had a series of successful showings over three U23 world championships. He is the only British athlete to win every sweep event at the U23 world championships.

In his debut at the 2021 championships in Račice, Czech Republic, he was part of the gold medal-winning GB eight. Beeson was in the two seat and his crewmates were Noah Norman, Simon Nunayon, Tobias Schröder, Felix Drinkall, Callum Sullivan, Joshua Bowesman-Jone, Michael Dalton, and Scott Cockle. Although they were only in 4th place at the 500m mark, they fought back to take the lead with about five strokes left in the race.

In 2022 in Varese, Italy, Beeson took part in the BM4, with crewmates Douwe de Graaf, Calvin Tarczy, and Theodore Darlow. They won their heat, and went on to win the final by over two seconds, ahead of New Zealand.

For his final U23 championships in 2023 in Plovdiv, Bulgaria, Beeson competed in the pair with Henry Geffen, again taking gold. The pair came second in their heat behind Italy, but won their A/B semi-final, and went on the beat the Italians by less than a second in the A final in a tightly fought race. Beeson is named in the Molesey Boat Club list of champions for all three of his U23 wins.

From 2018 to 2023, Beeson was an student athlete at Yale University, competing in the heavyweight men's crew. As a freshman he rowed in the 2V and won bronze at the Intercollegiate Rowing Association (IRA) nationals. His sophomore season was cancelled due to COVID-19. He spent most of the 21/22 season rowing in the 1V, which won the Albert Cup and set a new Yale course record. He remained in the Yale 1V for his whole senior year.

=== Senior career ===
Beeson made his senior World Championship debut in 2025 in the eight, held on Dianshan Lake, in Shanghai, China. His crewmates were Matt Rowe, Matt Aldridge, Sam Nunn, Fergus Woolnough, David Bewicke-Copley, Archie Drummond, Will Stewart, and Will Denegri. They won their heat, but came second in the A Final, behind the Netherlands.

Beeson won the 2025 European Rowing Championships in the eight. The GB eight beat the Netherlands and won the final by just over two-tenths of a second.

At the 2024 World Cup III, Beeson raced in the M4, finishing 5th. In 2025, at the World Cup – Varese, Beeson came 1st on the eight. In Seville, at the first 2026 World Cup, Beeson sat in the seven seat of the GB mens eight. They came third in the preliminary race and moved up to second in the final.

Beeson trains and competes with Leander Club. He won the Head of the River Race with them in 2024 and 2025.

=== GB rowing trials ===
During his U23 career, Beeson was exempt from GB on water trials as he was based overseas.

In 2024, a 4 km water assessment formed the November trials in which Beeson came 10th in the M2- category with his pairs partner Harry Geffen, with whom he had won the U23 world championships the year prior. At the February trials he came 5th in the M2- over the 5 km time trial with partner Jack Prior. The April trials, an invitation only, 2 km, multi-lane regatta held in Caversham, were used for development athletes as the Olympic hopeful crews were racing at the World Cup I. Beeson once again placed 5th in the Men's pair, again racing with Jack Prior. During April trials he was presented the Mark Lees Award, given out each year to up-and-coming rowers based on their results in the previous season.

At the February 2025 trials, Beeson raced with Tom Ballinger and placed 6th over the 5 km time trial. In the April 2 km trial he paired up with Joshua Bowesman-Jones, with whom he had raced in the gold-winning BM8+ in 2021, and together they came 3rd.

With Beeson being exempt from November trials due to racing at the World Championships and February trials being cancelled due to bad weather, the April 2026 invitational trials were his main chance to demonstrate his skills against other British rowers. This time racing with Archie Drummond, Beeson once again placed 3rd. At these trials, he raced for both Leander Club and Aberdeen BC, the latter for the first time.

== Feather & Square ==
In 2021, while at Yale University, Beeson founded Feather & Square, in response to a lack of available treatments for rowing blisters. The company's main product is a British-produced hand balm designed to moisturise skin without softening it, and heal dry, blistered hands. The company also sells Feather & Square merchandise, such as caps and jumpers. The Feather & Square social media pages publish short-form meme content that has become popular amongst the rowing community.
