= 2022 World Rowing U23 Championships =

Rowing event

- Venue: Lake Varese
- Location: Varese, Italy
- Dates: 25–30 July

The 2022 World Rowing U23 Championships was the 18th edition of the World Rowing U23 Championships that was held from 25 July to 30 July 2022 in Varese, Italy along with the 2022 World Rowing Junior Championships.

== Men's events ==
Event	Gold		Silver		Bronze	
Openweight events
M1x	Jonas Gelsen; Germany	7:11.71	Isaiah Harrison; United States	7:14.89	Emil Neykov; Bulgaria	7:16.31
M2x	Belgium (b) Tristan Vandenbussche (s) Aaron Andries	6:18.64	Moldova (b) Alexandr Bulat (s) Ivan Corșunov	6:21.86	Ireland (b) Konan Pazzaia (s) Brian Colsh	6:23.19
M4x	Italy (b) Nicolò Bizzozero (2) Leonardo Tedoldi (3) Matteo Sartori (s) Andrea Pazzagli	5:53.05	Germany (b) Tom Granitz (2) Paul Berghoff (3) Oliver Holtz (s) Alexander Finger	5:54.84	New Zealand (b) Jack Ready (2) Ben Olifiers (3) Jonte Wright (s) Benjamin Mason	5:58.91
M2-	South Africa (b) Damien Bonhage-Koen (s) Christopher Baxter	6:19.99	Lithuania (b) Dovydas Stankūnas (s) Domantas Stankūnas	6:21.25	Romania (b) Andrei Mândrilă (s) Claudiu Neamţu	6:23.28
M4-	Great Britain (b) Theodore Darlow (2) Miles Beeson (3) Calvin Tarczy (s) Douwe de Graaf	6:03.04	New Zealand (b) Angus Gilbert (2) Logan Ullrich (3) Campbell Crouch (s) Flynn Eliadis-Watson	6:05.86	Ireland (b) Adam Murphy (2) Nathan Timoney (3) Andrew Sheehan (s) John Kearney	6:09.10
M4+	Great Britain (b) Henry Pearson (2) Robert Prosser (3) Benjamin Hinves (s) Bruce Turnell (c) William Denegri	6:02.90	United States (b) Zachary Vachal (2) Benjamin Dukes (3) Nathan Phelps (s) Erik Spinka (c) William Dempsey	6:06.13	Italy (b) Antonio Zaffiro (2) Aniello Sabbatino (3) Volodymyr Kuflyk (s) Ivan Galimberti (c) Filippo Wiesenfeld	6:07.92
M8+	Great Britain (b) Isaac Workman (2) Theodore Bell (3) Jack Prior (4) Matthew Heywood (5) Thomas Horncastle (6) Thomas O'Sullivan (7) Jake Wincomb (s) Harry Geffen (c) Scott Cockle	5:51.71	United States (b) Kai Hoite (2) Alexander Abuhoff (3) Adam Campain (4) Charles Fargo (5) Miles Hudgins (6) Jacob Hudgins (7) James Wright (s) William Legenzowski (c) Jack DiGiovanni	5:53.97	Australia (b) Jamie Arnold (2) Marcus Emmett (3) Patrick Long (4) Joshua Hill (5) Alexander McClean (6) Angus Dawson (7) Darcy McCluskey (s) Fergus Hamilton (c) Harry Keenan	5:54.90
Lightweight events
LM1x	Felipe Klüver; Uruguay	7:08.83	Gian Struzina; Switzerland	7:12.73	Stephen Harris; Canada	7:17.56
LM2x	Italy (b) Giovanni Borgonovo (s) Giulio Acernese	6:34.37	Ireland (b) Ciaran Purdy (s) Hugh Moore	6:36.95	France (b) Pierrick Verger (s) Baptiste Savaete	6:38.34
LM4x	Italy (b) Luca Borgonovo (2) Nicolò Demiliani (3) Krystian Maron (s) Matteo Tonelli	5:45.42	Germany (b) Adrian Reinstädtler (2) Tim Streib (3) Oskar Kroglowski (s) Yannick Dörr	5:49.70	France (b) Léo-Paul Fiacre (2) Antoine Lefèbvre (3) Louis Pruvost (s) Clément Mariot	5:51.29
LM2-	United States (b) Collin Hay (s) Nathaniel Sass	6:36.94	Italy (b) Francesco Bardelli (s) Stefano Pinsone	6:37.92	Chile (b) Manuel Fernández (s) Rodrigo Paz	6:41.76

== Women's events ==
Event	Gold		Silver		Bronze	
Openweight events
W1x	Alexandra Föster; Germany	7:56.13	Aurelia-Maxima Janzen; Switzerland	8:03.03	Alison Bergin; Ireland	8:03.49
W2x	Romania (b) Andrada-Maria Moroşanu (s) Iulia-Liliana Bălăucă	7:02.61	Canada (b) Elisa Bolinger (s) Grace VandenBroek	7:04.70	Great Britain (b) Vwairé Obukohwo (s) Katherine George	7:05.18
W4x	Netherlands (b) Lisa Bruijnincx (2) Vera Sneijders (3) Willemijn Mulder (s) Femke Paulis	6:18.30	Romania (b) Emanuela-Ioana Ciotău (2) Cristina Drugă (3) Alexandra Ungureanu (s) Patricia Cireş	6:18.88	Germany (b) Lena Siekerkotte (2) Johanna Debus (3) Lena Wölke (s) Rianne Lagerpusch	6:20.72
W2-	Greece (b) Evangelia Fragkou (s) Christina Bourmpou	6:58.41	Lithuania (b) Martyna Kazlauskaitė (s) Kamilė Kralikaitė	7:04.27	Germany (b) Katarina Tkachenko (s) Luisa Schade	7:05.69
W4-	United States (b) Caitlin Esse (2) Anna Jensen (3) Francesca Raggi (s) Kaitlin Knifton	6:38.12	Great Britain (b) Phoebe Campbell (2) Lauren Carey (3) Georgina Robinson (s) Lettice Cabot	6:43.88	Australia (b) Eliza Gaffney (2) Genevieve Hart (3) Jacqueline Swick (s) Paige Barr	6:46.76
W4+	Australia (b) Isabella Scammell (2) Samantha Morton (3) Emma Wilson (s) Emmie Frederico (c) Nicholas Dunlop	6:44.15	Italy (b) Anna Scolaro (2) Anna Rossi (3) Khadija Alajdi El Idrissi (s) Alice Codato (c) Alessandra Faella	6:45.73	United States (b) Katherine Kelly (2) Elena Collier-Hezel (3) Greta Filor (s) Angela Szabo (c) Caroline Ricksen	6:48.35
W8+	United States (b) Hannah Heideveld (2) Sophia Hahn (3) Madison Moore (4) Camille Vandermeer (5) Margaret Hedeman (6) Kathia Nitsch (7) Azja Czajkowski (s) Isabella Battistoni (c) Rachel Rane	6:23.03	Great Britain (b) Abigail Topp (2) Phoebe Snowden (3) Hannah Medcalf (4) Natasha Morrice (5) Katharine Kalap (6) Zoe Scheske (7) Daisy Bellamy (s) Elizabeth Witt (c) Sam Shuker	6:27.81	Germany (b) Tori Schwerin (2) Paula Gerundt (3) Emilia Fritz (4) Olivia Clotten (5) Luise Bachmann (6) Maike Böttcher (7) Lene Mührs (s) Anni Kötitz (c) Annalena Fisch	6:31.20
Lightweight events
LW1x	Evangelia Anastasiadou; Greece	7:40.82	Elis Özbay; Turkey	7:43.81	Giulia Clerici; Italy	7:49.07
LW2x	Italy (b) Elena Sali (s) Greta Parravicini	7:21.58	Germany (b) Ayse Gündüz (s) Lea Schneider	7:24.78	Poland (b) Jessika Sobocińska (s) Wiktoria Kalinowska	7:25.67
LW4x	Italy (b) Bianca Saffirio (2) Maria Sole Perugino (3) Alice Ramella (s) Sara Borghi	6:30.20	Germany (b) Rieke Hülsen (2) Claire Licht (3) Finja Lara Rothardt (s) Romy Dreher	6:37.91	France (b) Noémie Sepe (2) Marion Chagnot (3) Eugénie Bertrand (s) Inès Boccanfuso	6:46.40
LW2-	Italy (b) Maria Zerboni (s) Samantha Premerl	7:17.42	Peru (b) Alessia Palacios (s) Valeria Palacios	7:20.99	Germany (b) Anna Händle (s) Cecilia Sommerfeld	7:22.10

== Medal table ==
* Host nation (Italy)

Rank	Nation	Gold	Silver	Bronze	Total
1	Italy (ITA)*	6	2	2	10
2	United States (USA)	3	3	1	7
3	Great Britain (GBR)	3	2	1	6
4	Germany (GER)	2	4	4	10
5	Greece (GRE)	2	0	0	2
6	Romania (ROU)	1	1	1	3
7	Australia (AUS)	1	0	2	3
8	Belgium (BEL)	1	0	0	1
8	Netherlands (NED)	1	0	0	1
8	South Africa (RSA)	1	0	0	1
8	Uruguay (URU)	1	0	0	1
12	Lithuania (LTU)	0	2	0	2
12	Switzerland (SUI)	0	2	0	2
14	Ireland (IRL)	0	1	3	4
15	Canada (CAN)	0	1	1	2
15	New Zealand (NZL)	0	1	1	2
17	Moldova (MDA)	0	1	0	1
17	Peru (PER)	0	1	0	1
17	Turkey (TUR)	0	1	0	1
20	France (FRA)	0	0	3	3
21	Bulgaria (BUL)	0	0	1	1
21	Chile (CHI)	0	0	1	1
21	Poland (POL)	0	0	1	1
Totals (23 entries)		22	22	22	66

== Participants ==
A total of 780 rowers from the national teams of the following 56 countries was registered to compete at 2022 World Rowing U23 Championships.

- Algeria (3)
- Argentina (6)
- Australia (38)
- Austria (11)
- Azerbaijan (1)
- Bahamas (1)
- Belgium (5)
- Brazil (8)
- Bulgaria (3)
- Canada (27)
- Chile (8)
- Chinese Taipei (4)
- Croatia (5)
- Cyprus (1)
- Czech Republic (20)
- Denmark (14)
- Egypt (14)
- Estonia (16)
- Finland (2)
- France (39)
- Germany (70)
- Great Britain (46)
- Greece (10)
- Hungary (14)
- Ireland (10)
- Israel (3)
- Italy (66)
- Japan (8)
- Kazakhstan (2)
- Latvia (4)
- Lithuania (11)
- Mexico (8)
- Moldova (4)
- Morocco (1)
- Netherlands (27)
- New Zealand (29)
- Norway (7)
- Philippines (3)
- Peru (4)
- Poland (24)
- Portugal (2)
- Puerto Rico (1)
- Romania (44)
- Singapore (2)
- Slovenia (2)
- South Africa (4)
- Spain (16)
- Switzerland (16)
- Thailand (1)
- Tunisia (2)
- Turkey (5)
- Ukraine (17)
- United States (68)
- Uruguay (13)
- Uzbekistan (8)
- Zimbabwe (2)

== See also ==
- 2022 World Rowing Championships
- 2022 World Rowing Junior Championships
