= 2026 World Rowing Championships – Men's eight =

Men's eight at the 2026 World Rowing Championships
- Venue: Bosbaan
- Location: Amsterdam, Netherlands
- Dates: 29–30 August
- Competitors: 117 from 13 nations
- Winning time: 5:17.75

Medalists
gold medal	Ralf Rienks; Finn Florijn; Wibout Rustenburg; Jorn Salverda; Sander de Graaf; Pieter van Veen; Jan van der Bij; Mick Makker; Jonna de Vries	Netherlands
silver medal	William Stewart; Matthew Rowe; Gabriel Obholzer; Sam Nunn; David Bewicke-Copley; Harry Geffen; Miles Beeson; Archie Drummond; Tom Bryce	Great Britain
bronze medal	Rohan Lavery; Austin Reinehr; Alex Nichol; Jack Robertson; Harry Manton; Fergus Hamilton; Patrick Long; Mitch Salisbury; Nicholas Dunlop	Australia

The men's eight competition at the 2026 World Rowing Championships will take place at Bosbaan, in Amsterdam.

== Schedule ==
The schedule was as follows:

Date	Time	Round
Saturday, 29 August 2026	16:46	Heats
Sunday, 30 August 2026	11:05	Semifinals
Sunday, 30 August 2026	14:05	Final B
Sunday, 30 August 2026	14:38	Final A

All times are Central European Summer Time (UTC+2)

== Results ==
=== Heats ===
The two fastest boats in each heat and the six fastest times advanced to the semifinals. Remaining crew eliminated.

==== Heat 1 ====
Rank	Rower	Country	Time	Notes
1	William Stewart; Matthew Rowe; Gabriel Obholzer; Sam Nunn; David Bewicke-Copley; Harry Geffen; Miles Beeson; Archie Drummond; Tom Bryce (c)	Great Britain	5:29.90	SF
2	Claudiu Neamtu; Mateus-Simion Cozminciuc; Mugurel Semciuc; Andrei Mândrilă; Constantin Adam; Sergiu Bejan; Florin Arteni; Fabrizio-Alexandru Scripcariu; Rucsandra-Ioana Bucsa (F) (c)	Romania	5:32.10	SF
3	Nunzio di Colandrea; Alfonso Scalzone; Giovanni Abagnale; Matteo Sartori; Leonardo Pietra Caprina; Giuseppe Vicino; Matteo Lodo; Giovanni Codato; Alessandra Faella (F) (c)	Italy	5:32.46	SF
4	Dzianis Kucharau; Uladzislau Lokun; Aliaksei Bandziuk; Aliaksandr Daroshchanka; Dzianis Klimiato; Anton Kupalau; Dzmitry Furman; Siarhei Valadzko; Valeryia Tseliak (F) (c)	Individual Neutral Athletes	5:41.39	SF
5	Wangjia Wangjia; Sun Jiahui; Yin Junjie; Sun Simiao; Zhang Yuanze; Zhang Songhu; Ji Gaoxing; Su Fuxiang; Liang Xiaotong (c)	China	5:43.32	

==== Heat 2 ====
Rank	Rower	Country	Time	Notes
1	Ralf Rienks; Finn Florijn; Wibout Rustenburg; Jorn Salverda; Sander de Graaf; Pieter van Veen; Jan van der Bij; Mick Makker; Jonna de Vries (F) (c)	Netherlands	5:30.53	SF
2	Soenke Kruse; Tobias Strangemann; Olaf Roggensack; Mattes Schönherr; Max John; Julius Christ; Paul Klapperich; Frederik Breuer; Jonas Wiesen (c)	Germany	5:31.70	SF
3	Szymon Tomiak; Kazmir Ziven Kujda; Cezary Litka; Michał Szpakowski; Jerzy Kaczmarek; Mateusz Wilangowski; Emilian Jackowiak; Oskar Streich; Julia Wisniewska (F) (c)	Poland	5:39.35	SF
4	Maksym Semenov; Oleh Kravchenko; Artem Verestiuk; Yuriy Ivanov; Mykola Mazur; Ivan Dovhodko; Maksym Boklazhenko; Oleksii Selivanov; Anastasiia Kozyr (F) (c)	Ukraine	5:43.26	SF

==== Heat 3 ====
Rank	Rower	Country	Time	Notes
1	Michael Herman; Charles Fargo; Wilson Morton; Billy Bender; Madison Molitor; Samuel Sullivan; Nathan Phelps; Josh Diggons; Rachel Rane (F) (c)	United States	5:29.99	SF
2	Rohan Lavery; Austin Reinehr; Alex Nichol; Jack Robertson; Harry Manton; Fergus Hamilton; Patrick Long; Mitch Salisbury; Nicholas Dunlop (c)	Australia	5:30.19	SF
3	Campbell Crouch; Fred Vavasour; Harry Fitzpatrick; Joshua Vodanovich; Ollie Maclean; Matt Macdonald; Oliver Welch; Benjamin Taylor; Oliver Duncan (c)	New Zealand	5:34.30	SF
4	Saulius Aušbikavičius; Arnedas Kelmelis; Povilas Juškevičius; Jonas Šaparavičius; Dovydas Stankūnas; Mantas Juškevičius; Povilas Stankūnas; Domantas Stankūnas; Edgaras Savickis (c)	Lithuania	5:37.10	SF

=== Semifinals ===
The three fastest boats in each heat advance to the Final A. The remaining boats were sent to the Final B.

==== Semifinal 1 ====
Rank	Rower	Country	Time	Notes
1	Ralf Rienks; Finn Florijn; Wibout Rustenburg; Jorn Salverda; Sander de Graaf; Pieter van Veen; Jan van der Bij; Mick Makker; Jonna de Vries (F) (c)	Netherlands	5:20.77	FA
2	William Stewart; Matthew Rowe; Gabriel Obholzer; Sam Nunn; David Bewicke-Copley; Harry Geffen; Miles Beeson; Archie Drummond; Tom Bryce (c)	Great Britain	5:21.08	FA
3	Soenke Kruse; Theis Hagemeister; Olaf Roggensack; Mattes Schönherr; Tassilo Von Mueller; Julius Christ; Paul Klapperich; Frederik Breuer; Jonas Wiesen (c)	Germany	5:25.88	FA
4	Campbell Crouch; Fred Vavasour; Harry Fitzpatrick; Joshua Vodanovich; Ollie Maclean; Matt Macdonald; Oliver Welch; Benjamin Taylor; Oliver Duncan (c)	New Zealand	5:28.36	FB
5	Szymon Tomiak; Kazmir Ziven Kujda; Cezary Litka; Michał Szpakowski; Jerzy Kaczmarek; Mateusz Wilangowski; Emilian Jackowiak; Oskar Streich; Julia Wisniewska (F) (c)	Poland	5:41.16	FB
6	Maksym Semenov; Oleh Kravchenko; Artem Verestiuk; Yuriy Ivanov; Mykola Mazur; Ivan Dovhodko; Maksym Boklazhenko; Oleksii Selivanov; Anastasiia Kozyr (F) (c)	Ukraine	6:13.92	FB

==== Semifinal 2 ====
Rank	Rower	Country	Time	Notes
1	Rohan Lavery; Austin Reinehr; Alex Nichol; Jack Robertson; Harry Manton; Fergus Hamilton; Patrick Long; Mitch Salisbury; Nicholas Dunlop (c)	Australia	5:23.71	FA
2	Michael Herman; Charles Fargo; Wilson Morton; Billy Bender; Madison Molitor; Samuel Sullivan; Nathan Phelps; Josh Diggons; Rachel Rane (F) (c)	United States	5:25.04	FA
3	Nunzio di Colandrea; Alfonso Scalzone; Giovanni Abagnale; Matteo Sartori; Leonardo Pietra Caprina; Giuseppe Vicino; Matteo Lodo; Giovanni Codato; Alessandra Faella (F) (c)	Italy	5:25.49	FA
4	Claudiu Neamtu; Mateus-Simion Cozminciuc; Mugurel Semciuc; Andrei Mândrilă; Constantin Adam; Sergiu Bejan; Florin Arteni; Fabrizio-Alexandru Scripcariu; Rucsandra-Ioana Bucsa (F) (c)	Romania	5:25.82	FB
5	Saulius Aušbikavičius; Arnedas Kelmelis; Povilas Juškevičius; Jonas Šaparavičius; Dovydas Stankūnas; Mantas Juškevičius; Povilas Stankūnas; Domantas Stankūnas; Edgaras Savickis (c)	Lithuania	5:50.45	FB
6	Dzianis Kucharau; Uladzislau Lokun; Aliaksei Bandziuk; Aliaksandr Daroshchanka; Dzianis Klimiato; Anton Kupalau; Dzmitry Furman; Siarhei Valadzko; Valeryia Tseliak (F) (c)	Individual Neutral Athletes	6:01.98	FB

=== Finals ===
The A final determined the rankings for places 1 to 6. Additional rankings were determined in the other finals.

==== Final B ====
Rank	Rower	Country	Time	Total rank
1	Claudiu Neamtu; Mateus-Simion Cozminciuc; Mugurel Semciuc; Andrei Mândrilă; Constantin Adam; Sergiu Bejan; Florin Arteni; Fabrizio-Alexandru Scripcariu; Rucsandra-Ioana Bucsa (F) (c)	Romania	5:22.77	7
2	Campbell Crouch; Fred Vavasour; Harry Fitzpatrick; Joshua Vodanovich; Ollie Maclean; Matt Macdonald; Oliver Welch; Benjamin Taylor; Oliver Duncan (c)	New Zealand	5:23.58	8
3	Saulius Aušbikavičius; Arnedas Kelmelis; Povilas Juškevičius; Jonas Šaparavičius; Dovydas Stankūnas; Mantas Juškevičius; Povilas Stankūnas; Domantas Stankūnas; Edgaras Savickis (c)	Lithuania	5:24.99	9
4	Dzianis Kucharau; Uladzislau Lokun; Aliaksei Bandziuk; Aliaksandr Daroshchanka; Dzianis Klimiato; Anton Kupalau; Dzmitry Furman; Siarhei Valadzko; Valeryia Tseliak (F) (c)	Individual Neutral Athletes	5:30.79	10
5	Szymon Tomiak; Kazmir Ziven Kujda; Cezary Litka; Michał Szpakowski; Jerzy Kaczmarek; Mateusz Wilangowski; Emilian Jackowiak; Oskar Streich; Julia Wisniewska (F) (c)	Poland	5:31.25	11
6	Maksym Semenov; Oleh Kravchenko; Artem Verestiuk; Yuriy Ivanov; Mykola Mazur; Ivan Dovhodko; Maksym Boklazhenko; Oleksii Selivanov; Anastasiia Kozyr (F) (c)	Ukraine	5:42.54	12

==== Final A ====
Rank	Rower	Country	Time
1st place, gold medalist(s)	Ralf Rienks; Finn Florijn; Wibout Rustenburg; Jorn Salverda; Sander de Graaf; Pieter van Veen; Jan van der Bij; Mick Makker; Jonna de Vries (F) (c)	Netherlands	5:17.75
2nd place, silver medalist(s)	William Stewart; Matthew Rowe; Gabriel Obholzer; Sam Nunn; David Bewicke-Copley; Harry Geffen; Miles Beeson; Archie Drummond; Tom Bryce (c)	Great Britain	5:17.81
3rd place, bronze medalist(s)	Rohan Lavery; Austin Reinehr; Alex Nichol; Jack Robertson; Harry Manton; Fergus Hamilton; Patrick Long; Mitch Salisbury; Nicholas Dunlop (c)	Australia	5:18.28
4	Soenke Kruse; Theis Hagemeister; Olaf Roggensack; Mattes Schönherr; Tassilo Von Mueller; Julius Christ; Paul Klapperich; Frederik Breuer; Jonas Wiesen (c)	Germany	5:20.71
5	Michael Herman; Charles Fargo; Wilson Morton; Billy Bender; Madison Molitor; Samuel Sullivan; Nathan Phelps; Josh Diggons; Rachel Rane (F) (c)	United States	5:22.32
6	Nunzio di Colandrea; Alfonso Scalzone; Giovanni Abagnale; Matteo Sartori; Leonardo Pietra Caprina; Giuseppe Vicino; Matteo Lodo; Giovanni Codato; Alessandra Faella (F) (c)	Italy	5:32.14
