= List of world best times in rowing =

There are no world records in rowing due to the huge variability that weather conditions can have on times. Instead, there are world best times, which are set over the international rowing distance of 2,000 m.

== On-water records ==
Rowing times are strongly affected by weather conditions, and to a lesser extent by water temperature – the majority of these times were set in warm water with a strong tailwind. World best rowing times have also decreased because of improvements in technology to both the boats and the oars, along with improvements in the conditioning of the rowers.

Because environmental conditions have a strong impact on boat speed, World Rowing recognizes world best times instead of world records. A world best time is one recorded on a regatta course that has previously held the World Championships, Olympic Games, or World Cup since 1980. A number of record times were set at the 2005 World Rowing Championships held on the Nagara River at Kaizu, Gifu Prefecture, Japan, but due to a fast current caused by heavy rainfall from the remnants of Typhoon Mawar, World Rowing declared that the race results were not eligible to be considered as world best times.

There is a category for lightweight rowing. For men, the crew average, wearing racing kit, cannot exceed 70 kg (154 lb) and no rower may be over 72.5 kg (160 lb). For women, the limits are 57 kg (126 lb) and 59 kg (130 lb).

Hamish Bond and Eric Murray hold the record for most consecutive wins with 69.

=== Men ===
Boat	Time	Crew	Nation	Date	Event	Location	Ref
M1x; Single sculls	6:30.74	Robbie Manson	New Zealand	2017	Final; World Cup II	Poznań, Poland	
M2- Coxless pair	6:08.50	Hamish Bond; Eric Murray	New Zealand	2012	Heat; Olympic Games	Dorney, United Kingdom	
M2+ Coxed pair	6:33.26	Hamish Bond; Eric Murray; Caleb Shepherd (cox)	New Zealand	2014	Final; World Championships	Amsterdam, Netherlands	
M2x; Double sculls	5:59.72	Martin Sinković; Valent Sinković	Croatia	2014	Semi-final; World Championships	Amsterdam, Netherlands	
M4- Coxless four	5:37.86	Andrew Triggs Hodge; Tom James; Pete Reed; Alex Gregory	(United Kingdom) Great Britain	2012	Heat; World Cup II	Lucerne, Switzerland	
M4+ Coxed four	5:58.96	Matthias Ungemach; Armin Eichholz; Armin Weyrauch; Bahne Rabe; Jörg Dederding (cox)	Germany	1991	Final; World Championships	Vienna, Austria	
M4x; Quadruple sculls	5:32.03	Dirk Uittenbogaard; Abe Wiersma; Tone Wieten; Koen Metsemakers	Netherlands	28 July 2021	Final; Olympic Games	Tokyo, Japan	
M8+ Eight	5:17.75	Ralf Rienks; Finn Florijn; Wibout Rustenburg; Jorn Salverda; Sander de Graaf; Pieter van Veen; Jan van der Bij; Mick Makker; Jonna de Vries (cox)	Netherlands	30 August 2026	Final; World Rowing Championships	Amsterdam, Netherlands	
LM1x; Lightweight single sculls	6:39.56	Niels Torre	Italy	18 August 2024	Heat; World Championships	St. Catharines, Canada	
LM2- Lightweight coxless pair	6:22.91	Simon Niepmann; Lucas Tramèr	Switzerland	2014	Final; World Championships	Amsterdam, Netherlands	
LM2x; Lightweight double sculls	6:05.33	Fintan McCarthy; Paul O'Donovan	(Republic of Ireland) Ireland	28 July 2021	Semi-final; Olympic Games	Tokyo, Japan	
LM4- Lightweight coxless four	5:43.16	Kasper Winther Jørgensen; Jacob Larsen; Jacob Barsøe; Morten Jørgensen	Denmark	2014	Semi-final; World Championships	Amsterdam, Netherlands	
LM4x; Lightweight quadruple sculls	5:42.75	Georgios Konsolas; Spyridon Giannaros; Panagiotis Magdanis; Eleftherios Konsolas	Greece	2014	Final; World Championships	Amsterdam, Netherlands	
LM8+ Lightweight eight	5:30.24	Klaus Altena; Christian Dahlke; Thomas Melges; Bernhard Stomporowski; Michael Kobor; Uwe Maerz; Michael Buchheit; Kai von Warburg; Olaf Kaska (cox)	Germany	1992	Heat; World Championships	Montreal, Canada	

The greatest distance rowed in 24 hours is 342 km (212.5 miles) by Hannes Obreno, Pierre de Loof, Tim Brys, Mathieu Foucaud, Thijs Obreno, Giel Vanschoenbeek, Arjan van Belle and Thibaut Schollaert (all Belgians) on the Watersportbaan in Ghent, Belgium, on 2–3 October 2014. All eight participants were members of a student rowing club called VSR (Vlaamse Studentenvereniging der Roeiers [translates to Flanders Student Rowing Club]).

The greatest distance rowed in 1 hour is 17,555 m (10.91 miles) by the Delftse Studenten Roeivereniging Proteus-Eretes during the Hour boat race on 17 December 2017.

=== Women ===
Boat	Time	Crew	Nation	Date	Event	Location	Ref
W1x; Single sculls	7:07.71	Rumyana Neykova	Bulgaria	2002	Final; World Championships	Seville, Spain	
W2- Coxless pair	6:47.11	Annabelle McIntyre; Jessica Morrison	Australia	24 June 2023	Final; Holland Beker Regatta	Amsterdam, Netherlands	
W2x; Double sculls	6:37.31	Olympia Aldersey; Sally Kehoe	Australia	2014	Semi-final; World Championships	Amsterdam, Netherlands	
W4- Coxless four	6:14.36	Grace Prendergast; Kayla Pratt; Kerri Gowler; Kelsey Bevan	New Zealand	2014	Final; World Championships	Amsterdam, Netherlands	
W4x; Quadruple sculls	6:05.13	Chen Yunxia; Zhang Ling; Lü Yang; Cui Xiaotong	China	28 July 2021	Final; Olympic Games	Tokyo, Japan	
W8+ Eight	5:51.88	Cristina Drugă; Geanina Dumitrița Juncănariu; Ancuța Bodnar; Maria Lehaci; Maria-Magdalena Rusu; Amalia Chelaru; Adriana Adam; Simona Radiș; Victoria-Ștefania Petreanu (cox)	Romania	30 August 2026	Final; World Championships	Amsterdam, Netherlands	
LW1x; Lightweight single sculls	7:23.36	Imogen Grant	(United Kingdom) Great Britain	9 July 2022	Final; World Cup III	Lucerne, Switzerland	
LW2- Lightweight coxless pair	7:17.02	Jessika Sobocinska; Katarzyna Wełna	Poland	24 August 2024	Final; World Championships	St. Catharines, Canada	
LW2x; Lightweight double sculls	6:40.47	Emily Craig; Imogen Grant	(United Kingdom) Great Britain	17 June 2023	Semi-final; World Cup II	Varese, Italy	
LW4x; Lightweight quadruple sculls	6:15.95	Mirte Kraaijkamp; Elisabeth Woerner; Maaike Head; Ilse Paulis	Netherlands	2014	Final; World Championships	Amsterdam, Netherlands	

== Indoor records ==
These results are based on a standard distance of 2,000 meters.

SIR – Static Indoor Rower (Indoor Rower) – Concept2
IRwS – Indoor Rower with Slides (Slides) – Concept2
DIR – Dynamic Indoor Rower (Dynamic)

DIR Concept2
DIR RP3

Type	Category	Time	Split	Nation	Date	Name	Ref
SIR	Open Men	5:33.4	1:23.3	Netherlands	18 March 2026	Simon Van Dorp	
SIR	Lightweight Men	5:56.7	1:29.2	Denmark	2012	Henrik Stephansen	
SIR	Open Women	6:21.1	1:35.3	United States	2021	Brooke Mooney	
SIR	Lightweight Women	6:53.8	1:43.4	Canada	2019	Jennifer Casson	
IRwS	Open Men	5:40.6	1:25.1	United States	2024	Marcus Cannon Lorgen	
IRwS	Lightweight Men	6:03.5	1:30.8	United States	3 November 2026	Will Tran	
IRwS	Open Women	6:46.8	1:41.7	United States	2006	Taliesin Davies	
IRwS	Lightweight Women	7:29.7	1:52.4	United States	2008	Lynn Bender	
DIR C2	Open Men	5:41.8	1:25.4	New Zealand	2012	Eric Murray	
DIR RP3	Open Men	5:21.47	1:20.37	Netherlands	14 April 2026	Simon Van Dorp	
DIR	Lightweight Men	5:56.80	1:29.2	(Republic of Ireland) Ireland	7 March 2024	Jake McCarthy	
DIR	Open Women	6:18.56	1:34.64	(Republic of Ireland) Ireland	30 January 2026	Fiona Murtagh	
DIR	Lightweight Women	8:10.4	2:02.6	United States	2013	Elizabeth Sheldon	

- Lwt Men: 75 kg (165 lb) maximum weight
- Lwt Women: 61.5 kg (136 lb) maximum weight

Note: the standard machine for indoor records is the Concept2 indoor rower. "Split" refers to the average time to complete 500 m (i.e., the 2,000 m time divided by 4).
