= 2025 World Rowing Championships – Men's eight =

Men's eight at the 2025 World Rowing Championships
- Venue: Dianshan Lake
- Location: Shanghai, China
- Dates: 25–27 September
- Competitors: 90 from 10 nations
- Winning time: 5:27.67

Medalists
gold medal	Eli Brouwer; Finn Florijn; Wibout Rustenburg; Jorn Salverda; Sander de Graaf; Pieter van Veen; Jan van der Bij; Mick Makker; Jonna de Vries	Netherlands
silver medal	William Stewart; Archie Drummond; David Bewicke-Copley; Fergus Woolnough; Miles Beeson; Samuel Nunn; Matt Aldridge; Matthew Rowe; William Denegri	Great Britain
bronze medal	Christian Tabash; Jacob Hudgins; Michael Herman; Alexander Hedge; Madison Molitor; Billy Bender; Gus Rodríguez; Pieter Quinton; Rachel Rane	United States

The men's eight competition at the 2025 World Rowing Championships took place at Dianshan Lake, in Shanghai.

== Schedule ==
The schedule was as follows:

Date	Time	Round
Thursday 25 September 2025	10:17	Heats
Saturday, 27 September 2025	13:49	Final B
Saturday, 27 September 2025	15:18	Final A

All times are UTC+08:00

== Results ==
=== Heats ===
The two fastest boats in each heat and the four fastest times advanced to the Final A.

==== Heat 1 ====
Rank	Rower	Country	Time	Notes
1	William Stewart; Archie Drummond; David Bewicke-Copley; Fergus Woolnough; Miles Beeson; Samuel Nunn; Matt Aldridge; Matthew Rowe; William Denegri (c)	Great Britain	5:41.07	FA
2	Emanuele Gaetani Liseo; Salvatore Monfrecola; Giovanni Abagnale; Matteo Sartori; Leonardo Pietra Caprina; Giuseppe Vicino; Nunzio di Colandrea; Giovanni Codato; Alessandra Faella (F) (c)	Italy	5:41.83	FA
3	Mitch Salisbury; Alexander McClean; Jack Robertson; Marcus Emmett; Harry Manton; Alex Nichol; Angus Dawson; Patrick Long; Nicholas Dunlop (c)	Australia	5:43.29	FA
4	Tomasz Lewicki; Kazmir Ziven Kujda; Szymon Tomiak; Mateusz Wilangowski; Jerzy Kaczmarek; Michał Szpakowski; Emilian Jackowiak; Oskar Streich; Magdalena Ladna (F) (c)	Poland	5:45.52	FA
5	Mihăiță Țigănescu; Laurențiu Danciu; Mateus Simion Cozminciuc; Fabrizio-Alexandru Scripcariu; Bogdan Sabin Băițoc; Leontin Nutescu; Constantin Adam; Claudiu Neamțu; Adrian Munteanu (c)	Romania	5:55.41	FB

==== Heat 2 ====
Rank	Rower	Country	Time	Notes
1	Eli Brouwer; Finn Florijn; Wibout Rustenburg; Jorn Salverda; Sander de Graaf; Pieter van Veen; Jan van der Bij; Mick Makker; Jonna de Vries (F) (c)	Netherlands	5:42.29	FA
2	Christian Tabash; Jacob Hudgins; Michael Herman; Alexander Hedge; Madison Molitor; Billy Bender; Gus Rodríguez; Pieter Quinton; Rachel Rane (F) (c)	United States	5:46.36	FA
3	Paul Klapperich; Mattes Schoenherr; Benedict Eggeling; Tobias Strangemann; Olaf Roggensack; Julius Christ; Soenke Kruse; Theis Hagemeister; Jonas Wiesen (c)	Germany	5:49.18	FB
4	Maijken Meindertsma; Samuel Stewart; Ryan Clegg; Axel Ewashko; Trevor Jones; Terek Been; Joel Cullen; Steven Rosts; Laura Court (F) (c)	Canada	6:11.74	FB
5	Cao Chuang; Xia Hongyu; Yang Yue; Cong Sheng; Xia Yufei; Zhang Maolin; Liu Dang; Shen Yushuang; Song Jiayi (F) (c)	China	6:14.03	FB

=== Finals ===
The A final determined the rankings for places 1 to 6. Additional rankings were determined in the other finals.

==== Final B ====
Rank	Rower	Country	Time	Notes
1	Paul Klapperich; Mattes Schoenherr; Benedict Eggeling; Tobias Strangemann; Olaf Roggensack; Julius Christ; Soenke Kruse; Theis Hagemeister; Jonas Wiesen (c)	Germany	5:33.18	7
2	Mihăiță Țigănescu; Laurențiu Danciu; Mateus Simion Cozminciuc; Fabrizio-Alexandru Scripcariu; Bogdan Sabin Băițoc; Leontin Nutescu; Constantin Adam; Claudiu Neamțu; Adrian Munteanu (c)	Romania	5:36.58	8
3	Maijken Meindertsma; Samuel Stewart; Ryan Clegg; Axel Ewashko; Trevor Jones; Terek Been; Joel Cullen; Steven Rosts; Laura Court (F) (c)	Canada	5:43.15	9
4	Cao Chuang; Cong Sheng; Xia Yufei; Xia Hongyu; Yang Yue; Zhang Maolin; Liu Dang; Shen Yushuang; Song Jiayi (F) (c)	China	5:52.25	10

==== Final A ====
Rank	Rower	Country	Time	Notes
1st place, gold medalist(s)	Eli Brouwer; Finn Florijn; Wibout Rustenburg; Jorn Salverda; Sander de Graaf; Pieter van Veen; Jan van der Bij; Mick Makker; Jonna de Vries (F) (c)	Netherlands	5:27.67	
2nd place, silver medalist(s)	William Stewart; Archie Drummond; David Bewicke-Copley; Fergus Woolnough; Miles Beeson; Samuel Nunn; Matt Aldridge; Matthew Rowe; William Denegri (c)	Great Britain	5:29.93	
3rd place, bronze medalist(s)	Christian Tabash; Jacob Hudgins; Michael Herman; Alexander Hedge; Madison Molitor; Billy Bender; Gus Rodríguez; Pieter Quinton; Rachel Rane (F) (c)	United States	5:30.09	
4	Mitch Salisbury; Alexander McClean; Jack Robertson; Marcus Emmett; Harry Manton; Alex Nichol; Angus Dawson; Patrick Long; Nicholas Dunlop (c)	Australia	5:34.77	
5	Emanuele Gaetani Liseo; Salvatore Monfrecola; Giovanni Abagnale; Matteo Sartori; Leonardo Pietra Caprina; Giuseppe Vicino; Nunzio di Colandrea; Giovanni Codato; Alessandra Faella (F) (c)	Italy	5:35.88	
6	Tomasz Lewicki; Kazmir Ziven Kujda; Szymon Tomiak; Mateusz Wilangowski; Jerzy Kaczmarek; Michał Szpakowski; Emilian Jackowiak; Oskar Streich; Magdalena Ladna (F) (c)	Poland	5:37.35	
