= Rowing at the 2010 South American Games – Men's lightweight pair =

The Men's lightweight pair event at the 2010 South American Games was held over March 22 at 10:00.

== Medalists ==
Gold	Silver	Bronze
Miguel Angel Silva; Fabian Zbinden; Chile	Carlo Lauro; Pablo Manhic; Argentina	Alisson Araujo; Ronald Brito; Brazil

== Records ==
World Best Time
World best time	Ireland	6:26.61	Paris, France	1994

== Results ==
Rank	Rowers	Country	Time
1st place, gold medalist(s)	Miguel Angel Silva, Fabian Zbinden	Chile	7:00.34
2nd place, silver medalist(s)	Carlo Lauro, Pablo Manhic	Argentina	7:08.80
3rd place, bronze medalist(s)	Alisson Araujo, Ronald Brito	Brazil	7:26.94
	Julio Cesar Sanchez, Carlos Rolando Duarte	Ecuador	DNF
