= 2025 European Rowing Championships =

2025 edition of the European Rowing Championships

2025 European Championships
- Venue: Plovdiv
- Location: Plovdiv, Bulgaria
- Dates: 28 May – 1 June 2025 / 20 events

The 2025 European Rowing Championships were held from 29 May to 1 June 2025 in Plovdiv, Bulgaria.

In the PR1 men's single sculls finals, Great Britain's Benjamin Pritchard took the gold medal in a new world best time.

== Medal table ==
* Host nation (Bulgaria)

Rank	Nation	Gold	Silver	Bronze	Total
1	Great Britain	6	1	2	9
2	Germany	5	1	0	6
3	Romania	3	2	2	7
4	Netherlands	2	4	1	7
5	Ukraine	1	2	1	4
6	Austria	1	1	0	2
–	Individual Neutral Athletes (AIN)	1	0	2	3
7	Poland	1	0	1	2
8	Italy	0	3	3	6
9	Greece	0	2	0	2
10	Croatia	0	1	0	1
10	Georgia	0	1	0	1
10	Norway	0	1	0	1
10	Turkey	0	1	0	1
14	Denmark	0	0	1	1
14	France	0	0	1	1
14	Ireland	0	0	1	1
14	Israel	0	0	1	1
14	Moldova	0	0	1	1
14	Spain	0	0	1	1
14	Switzerland	0	0	1	1
Totals (20 entries)		20	20	19	59

== Medal summary ==
=== Men ===
Event	Gold		Silver		Bronze	
Openweight events
M1x	Yauheni Zalaty; Individual Neutral Athletes	6:41.09	Stefanos Ntouskos; Greece	6:44.90	Mihai Chiruță; Romania	6:45.80
M2x	Poland; Mirosław Ziętarski; Mateusz Biskup	6:02.93	Romania; Andrei Cornea; Marian Enache	6:03.87	Ireland; Fintan McCarthy; Konan Pazzaia	6:05.48
M4x	Great Britain; Cedol Dafydd; Callum Dixon; Matthew Haywood; Rory Harris	5:35.02	Netherlands; Mats van Sabben; Lucas Keijzer; Simon van Dorp; Gert-Jan van Doorn	5:36.70	Poland; Dominik Czaja; Piotr Plomiński; Jakub Woźniak; Konrad Domański	5:36.76
M2−	Romania; Florin Arteni; Florin Sorin Lehaci	6:11.57	Italy; Nunzio di Colandrea; Giovanni Codato	6:15.06	Spain; Jaime Canalejo Pazos; Javier Garcia Ordonez	6:16.72
M4−	Romania; Stefan Constantin Berariu; Sergiu Vasile Bejan; Andrei Mandrila; Ciprian Tudosa	5:48.27	Croatia; Patrik Loncaric; Anton Loncaric; Martin Sinkovic; Valent Sinkovic	5:49.78	France; Armand Pfister; Nikola Kolarevic; Valentin Onfroy; Teo Rayet	5:52.18
M8+	Great Britain; William Stewart; Matthew Rowe; Miles Beeson; Fergus Woolnough; David Bewicke-Copley; Sam Nunn; Matthew Aldridge; Archie Drummond; William Denegri	5:21.22	Netherlands; Lennart van Lierop; Jorn Salverda; Eli Brouwer; Olav Molenaar; Wibout Rustenburg; Guillaume Krommenhoek; Jan van der Bij; Mick Makker; Jonna de Vries	5:21.46	Italy; Davide Comini; Salvatore Monfrecola; Francesco Pallozzi; Alfonso Scalzone; Giovanni Abagnale; Alessandro Gardino; Nunzio di Colandrea; Giovanni Codato; Alessandra Faella	5:24.00
Lightweight events
LM1x	Germany; Fabio Kress	6:51.24	Turkey; Halil Kaan Köroğlu	6:51.63	Individual Neutral Athletes (AIN); Mikita Karneyeu	7:00.23
LM2x	Germany; Joachim Agne; Finn Wolter	6:25.53	Austria; Elias Hautsch; Mathias Mair	6:35.50	Not Awarded	
LM2-	Germany; Maximilian Aigner; Alexander Aigner	6:54.71	Georgia; Davit Lashkareishvili; Giorgi Kanteladze	6:59.12	Moldova; Nichita Naumciuc; Dmitrii Zincenco	7:03.99
Pararowing events
PR1 M1x	Benjamin Pritchard; Great Britain	8:40.38	Roman Polianskyi; Ukraine	8:51.93	Giacomo Perini; Italy	8:55.96

=== Women ===
Event	Gold		Silver		Bronze	
Openweight events
W1x	Lauren Henry; Great Britain	7:17.80	Fiona Murtagh; Ireland	7:21.11	Frida Sanggaard Nielsen; Denmark	7:23.57
W2x	Netherlands; Roos de Jong; Tessa Dullemans	6:48.83	Greece; Dimitra Kontou; Zoi Fitsiou	6:49.11	Romania; Andrada-Maria Morosanu; Mariana-Laura Dumitru	6:51.96
W4x	Great Britain; Sarah McKay; Lola Anderson; Cameron Nyland; Rebecca Wilde	6:11.00	Germany; Sarah Wibberenz; Frauke Hundeling; Lisa Gutfleisch; Pia Greiten	6:12.62	Netherlands; Lisa Bruijnincx; Lisanne van der Leij; Margot Leeuwenburgh; Willemijn Mulder	6:14.02
W2−	Romania; Maria Magdalena Rusu; Simona Radiș	6:49.18	Italy; Laura Meriano; Alice Codato	6:52.64	Great Britain; Eleanor Brinkhoff; Megan Slabbert	6:55.74
W4−	Netherlands; Nika Vos; Linn van Aanholt; Ymkje Clevering; Tinka Offereins	6:19.60	Romania; Ancuța Bodnar; Maria Lehaci; Adriana Adam; Amalia Bereș	6:21.50	Great Britain; Daisy Bellamy; Lauren Irwin; Martha Birtles; Heidi Long	6:26.28
W8+	Great Britain; Eleanor Brinkhoff; Daisy Bellamy; Amelia Standing; Juliette Perry; Lauren Irwin; Martha Birtles; Heidi Long; Megan Slabbert; Jack Tottem	6:02.34	Netherlands; Linn van Aanholt; Nika Johanna Vos; Claire de Kok; Ilse Kolkman; Hermine Drenth; Vera Sneijders; Ymkje Clevering; Tinka Offereins; Dieuwke Fetter	6:04.05	Italy; Clara Guerra; Elisa Mondelli; Stefania Gobbi; Giorgia Pelacchi; Silvia Terrazzi; Kiri English-Hawke; Laura Meriano; Alice Codato; Emanuele Capponi	6:07.13
Lightweight events
LW1x	Austria; Lara Tiefenthaler	7:29.39	Norway; Maia Emilie Lund	7:31.73	Individual Neutral Athletes (AIN); Mariia Zhovner	7:31.76
Para-rowing events
PR1 W1x	Anna Sheremet; Ukraine	9:56.60	Eva Mol; Netherlands	10:33.77	Claire Ghiringhelli; Switzerland	10:39.18

=== Mixed para-rowing events ===
Event	Gold		Silver		Bronze	
PR2 Mix2x	Germany; Jasmina Bier; Paul Umbach	8:04.35	Ukraine; Anna Aisanova; Iaroslav Koiuda	8:06.93	Israel; Shahar Milfelder; Saleh Shahin	8:10.00
PR3 Mix2x	Germany; Valentin Luz; Kathrin Marchand	6:57.41	Great Britain; Samuel Murray; Annabel Caddick	7:03.54	Ukraine; Dariia Kotyk; Stanislav Samoliuk	7:13.13
