= Gabriel Obholzer =

British rower (born 2003)

Personal information
- Nationality: British
- Born: 17 July 2003 (age 23)

Sport
- Country: Great Britain
- Sport: Rowing
- Event: Eight
Medal record
Men's rowing
Representing Great Britain
World Championships
Silver medal – second place	2026 Amsterdam	Eight
World U23 Championships
Gold medal – first place	2024 St. Catharines	Eight
Gold medal – first place	2025 Poznan	Eight

Gabriel Obholzer (born 17 July 2003) is a British rower. He was a medalist at the 2026 World Rowing Championships having previously won a gold medal at the World Rowing U23 Championships. He was a winner competing for Cambridge at The Boat Race 2026.

== Biography ==
The son of Rupert Obholzer who won an Olympic gold in 1996, and nephew of Anton Obholzer was competed for Great Britain at the Seoul Olympics in 1988, his mother Andrea rowed for Cambridge in the 1991 Boat Race.

Obholzer was educated at Radnor House School, Twickenham and rowed at Tideway Scullers School from the age of 11 years-old. He broke the British junior record at the British Rowing Indoor Championships as a teenager in 2020.

Obholzer spent four years studying and competing at Harvard University in the United States and later competed for Cambridge University and was a member of the winning boat at the The Boat Race 2026. He was a gold medalist competing in the men’s eight at the World Rowing U23 Championships in 2024 and 2025.

Obholzer won a silver medal at the 2026 World Rowing Championships in Amsterdam, in August 2026 as part of the men's eight.
