= Rohan Lavery =

Australian rower (born 2000)

Personal information
- Born: 13 September 2000 (age 25)
- Home town: Melbourne, Victoria, Australia
- Height: 189 cm (6 ft 2 in)

Sport
- Country: Australia
- Sport: Rowing
- Club: Melbourne University Boat Club
- Coached by: Rhett Ayliffe, Mark Prater

Achievements and titles
- National finals: King's Cup 2021-2022
Medal record
Men's rowing
Representing Australia
World Championships
Bronze medal – third place	2022 Račice	Eight
Bronze medal – third place	2026 Amsterdam	Eight

Rohan Lavery (born 13 September 2000) is an Australian representative rower. He is twice an Australian national champion and has represented at underage and senior World Championships. He won a bronze medal at the 2022 World Championships.

== Club and state rowing ==
Lavery was educated at Wesley College Melbourne where he took up rowing. His Australian senior club rowing has been from the Melbourne University Boat Club in Melbourne.

Lavery's state representative debut for Victoria came in 2019 when he was selected in the state youth eight to contest the Noel Wilkinson trophy at the Interstate Regatta. In 2021 he was selected in the Victorian men's senior eight which contested and won the Kings Cup. In 2022 and 2023 he again rowed in the Victorian men's senior eight at the Interstate Regatta.

== International representative rowing ==
Lavery made his Australian representative debut as stroke of the coxless four at the 2019 U23 World Rowing Championships in Sarasota, Florida. That crew finished in overall ninth place.

In March 2022 Lavery was selected in the Australian team for the 2022 international season and the 2022 World Rowing Championships. He stroked the Australian men's eight to silver medal placings at each of the World Rowing Cups in June and July. At the 2022 World Rowing Championships at Racize, Lavery moved into the bow seat of the eight rowing behind his brother Nicholas. The eight won through their repechage to make the A final where they raced to a third place and a World Championship bronze medal.

In March 2023 Lavery was again selected in the Australian senior men's sweep-oar squad for the 2023 international season.
