= Matthew Rowe (rower) =

British rower (born 1999)

Personal information
- Nationality: British
- Born: 19 May 1999 (age 27)

Sport
- Country: Great Britain
- Sport: Rowing
- Event: Fours/Eights
Medal record
Men's rowing
Representing Great Britain
World Championships
| Silver medal – second place | 2025 Shanghai | Eight |
| Silver medal – second place | 2026 Amsterdam | Eight |
European Championships
| Gold medal – first place | 2025 Plovdiv | Eight |

Matthew Rowe (born 19 May 1999) is a British rower. He was a gold medalist at the 2025 European Rowing Championships, and a silver medalist at the 2025 World Rowing Championships, in the men's eight.

== Early and personal life ==
Rowe qualifies for Wales through his grandfather and revived support from Welsh Rowing. He lived in Teddington and started rowing at the age of 14 years-old, having been inspired at an earlier age by family friend Rebecca Romero. He joined Kingston Rowing Club in 2014. He later attended Shrewsbury School from sixth form.

== Career ==
Rowe a gold medal at the 2019 World Rowing U23 Championships in the men's eight and also represented Great Britain at that level at the 2021 World Rowing U23 Championships in the Czech Republic, winning a bronze medal in the men’s four.

He made his senior debut for Great Britain in 2024, winning a bronze medal in the coxless four at the final World Rowing Cup event. That year, he was a member of the Leander Club crew which set a new course record at the Head of the River Race on the River Thames.

He won a gold medal at the 2025 European Rowing Championships in Plovdiv, in the men's eight and also won with the team at the World Rowing Cup event in Varese.

He won a silver medal at the 2025 World Rowing Championships in Shanghai, China, in September 2025 as part of the men's eight. He also won a silver medal at the 2026 World Rowing Championships in Amsterdam, in August 2026 as part of the men's eight.
