= Eli Brouwer =

Dutch rower

Personal information
- Born: July 14, 2000 (age 26)

Sport
- Sport: Rowing
Medal record
Men's rowing
Representing Netherlands
World Championships
Gold medal – first place	2025 Shanghai	Eight
Silver medal – second place	2026 Amsterdam	Coxless four
Silver medal – second place	2026 Amsterdam	Mixed eight
European Championships
Silver medal – second place	2025 Plovdiv	Eight

Eli Brouwer (born 14 July 2000) is a Dutch rower. He was a gold medalist at the 2025 World Rowing Championships.

== Career ==
Brouwer competed for the Netherlands at the 2025 European Rowing Championships in Plovdiv in June 2025, and won a silver medal in the eight event. He then also competed in Shanghai at the 2025 World Rowing Championships in September, and won a gold medal in the eight, the first time the Netherlands won gold in the event.

In Amsterdam in June 2026, he won a silver medal at the 2026 World Rowing Championships in the men's coxless four.
