= Pieter van Veen =

Dutch rower (born 1998)

Personal information
- Nationality: Dutch
- Born: 14 July 1998 (age 28)

Sport
- Country: Netherlands
- Sport: Rowing
- Event: Eight
Medal record
Men's rowing
Representing the Netherlands
World Championships
Gold medal – first place	2025 Shanghai	Eight
Gold medal – first place	2026 Amsterdam	Eight
World University Games
Gold medal – first place	2021 Chengdu	Coxless pair

Pieter van Veen (born 14 July 1998) is a Dutch rower.

== Career ==
Van Veen competed at the 2025 World Rowing Championships and won a gold medal in the eight with a time of 5:27.67. This was the first time the Netherlands won gold in the event at the World Rowing Championships. In August 2026, he competed at the 2026 World Rowing Championships and won a gold medal in the eight with a world best time of 5:17.75. Seven of the eight members were on the team that won their first world title in 2025.
