= Tom Bryce =

British rower (born 2003)

Personal information
- Born: 28 October 2003 (age 22)

Sport
- Country: United Kingdom
- Sport: Rowing
- Event: Eight
- Club: Oxford Brookes University Boat Club
Medal record
Rowing
Representing Great Britain
World Championships
Gold medal – first place	2025 Shanghai	PR3 Mix4+
Silver medal – second place	2026 Amsterdam	Eight
World U23 Championships
Gold medal – first place	2023 Plovdiv	Eight
Gold medal – first place	2024 St. Catharines	Eight
Gold medal – first place	2025 Poznan	Eight

Tom Bryce (born 28 October 2003) is a British coxswain.

== Career ==
Bryce rows for the Oxford Brookes University Boat Club. He is a three-time World U23 Champion in the men's eight.

He served as coxswain for Great Britain at the 2025 World Rowing Championships and won a gold medal in the PR3 Mixed coxed four event with a time of 6:52.12. This extended their fourteen year winning streak in the event at the World Rowing Championships. In August 2026, he competed at the 2026 World Rowing Championships and won a silver medal in the eights race, finishing 0.06 seconds behind the gold medal winning Dutch boat.
