= William Stewart (rower) =

British rower (born 1997)

Will Stewart
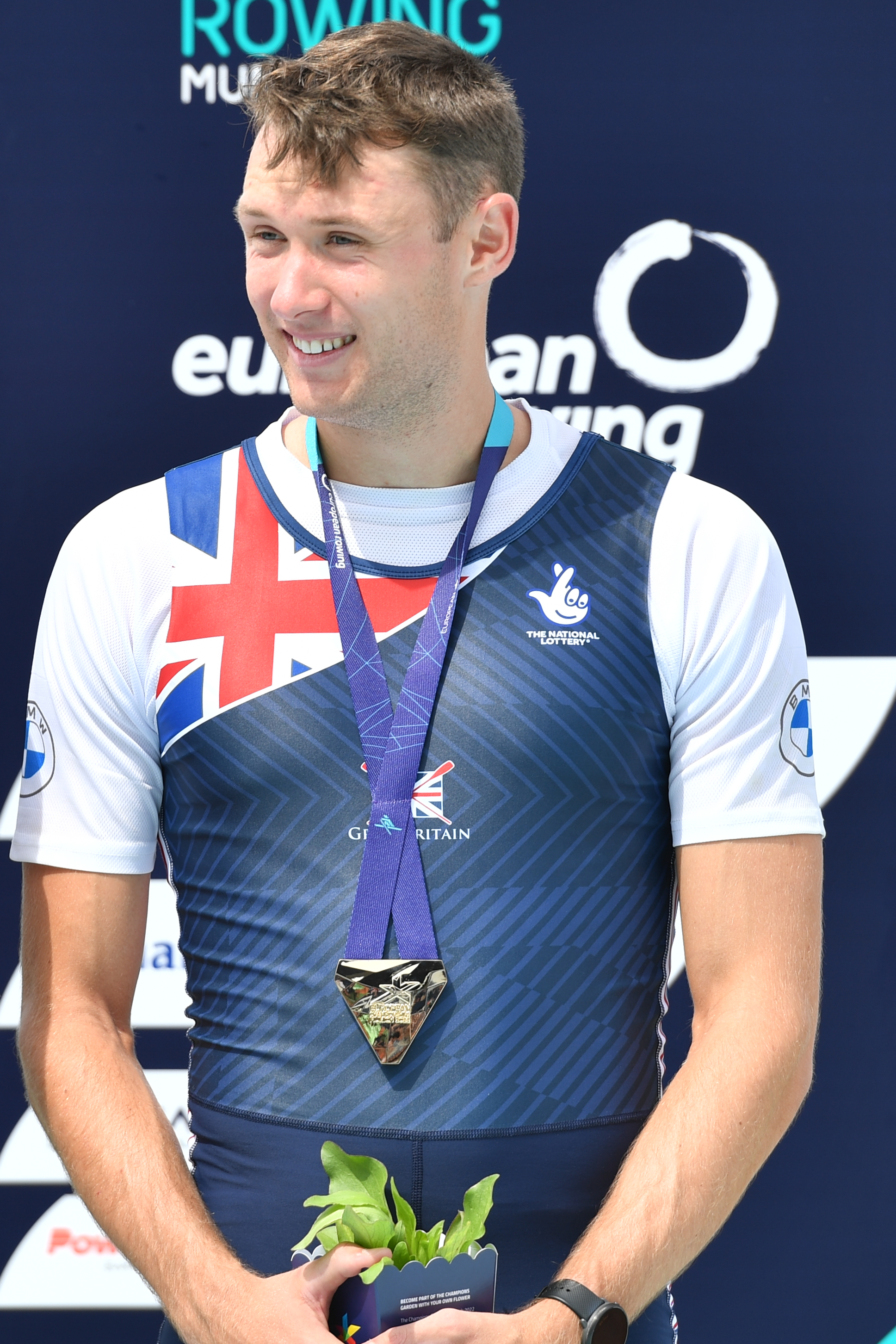
- Stewart 2022 in Munich

Personal information
- Nationality: British
- Born: 11 May 1997 (age 29)

Sport
- Country: Great Britain
- Sport: Rowing
- Event: Fours/Eights
- Club: Leander Club
Medal record
Men's rowing
Representing Great Britain
World Championships
Gold medal – first place	2022 Racize	Coxless four
Silver medal – second place	2025 Shanghai	Eight
Silver medal – second place	2026 Amsterdam	Eight
European Championships
Gold medal – first place	2022 Munich	Coxless four
Gold medal – first place	2025 Plovdiv	Eight

William Stewart (born 11 May 1997) is a British rower.

== Career ==
Stewart became a world champion after winning the coxless four at the 2022 World Rowing Championships. He had earlier won gold that season at the 2022 European Rowing Championships.

In 2023, he won the Grand Challenge Cup (the blue riband event at the Henley Royal Regatta) rowing for the Leander Club.
