= Sander de Graaf =

Dutch rower

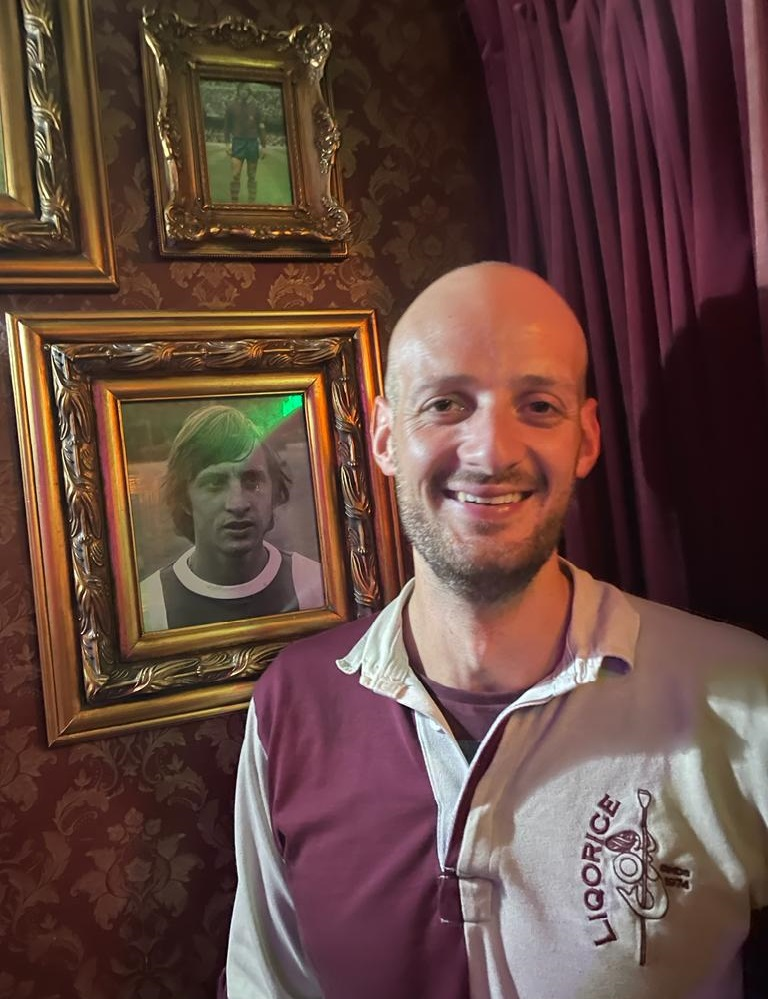
- De Graaf in 2022

Personal information
- Born: 13 June 1995 (age 31) Made, Netherlands
- Education: Eindhoven University of Technology
- Height: 2.06 m (6 ft 9 in)
- Weight: 98 kg (216 lb)

Sport
- Country: Netherlands
- Sport: Rowing
- Club: ESR Thêta

Achievements and titles
- Olympic finals: Tokyo 2020 M4-
Medal record
Men's rowing
Representing the Netherlands
Olympic Games
Silver medal – second place	2024 Paris	Eight
World Championships
Gold medal – first place	2025 Shanghai	Eight
Gold medal – first place	2026 Amsterdam	Eight
Silver medal – second place	2023 Belgrade	Eight
Bronze medal – third place	2022 Račice	Coxless four
European Championships
Gold medal – first place	2020 Poznań	Coxless four
Silver medal – second place	2022 Munich	Coxless four
Bronze medal – third place	2023 Bled	Eight

Sander de Graaf (born 13 June 1995) is a Dutch rower. He won a gold medal at the 2020 European Championships and competed at the 2020 Summer Olympics, both in the men's coxless four events.

== Career ==
De Graaf joined a rowing club during his first year at Eindhoven University of Technology in 2013.

He competed in the 2017 World U23 Championships, partnering with Jochem Kostelijk to finish seventh in the coxless pair event. In 2018, he paired with Vincent Klaassens at the World Championships, the World Rowing Cup and the European Championships. They also took a bronze medal at the Dutch national championships.

De Graaf transitioned to the coxless four event thereafter. He teamed with Freek Robbers, Jan van der Bij and Nelson Ritsema in the final stage of the 2019 World Rowing Cup in Rotterdam, where they placed seventh. In early 2020, national team head coach Mark Emke switched out veteran Vincent van der Want in favor of de Graaf on the Dutch boat. The new crew composed of de Graaf, van der Bij, Ritsema and Boudewijn Röell won the gold medal at the 2020 European Championships in Poznań. They were unable to repeat as European champions in 2021, however, finishing in fourth place. De Graaf competed with the crew the delayed 2020 Summer Olympics in Tokyo, which they had qualified for due to their performance at the 2019 World Championships prior to his inclusion. At the Tokyo Games he helped the crew reach the final via repechage, where they ultimately placed sixth.
