= Linn van Aanholt =

Dutch rower (born 2001)

Personal information
- Nationality: Dutch
- Born: 16 March 2001 (age 25)

Sport
- Country: Netherlands
- Sport: Rowing
Medal record
Women's rowing
Representing the Netherlands
World Championships
Gold medal – first place	2025 Shanghai	Eight
Silver medal – second place	2026 Amsterdam	Mixed eight
Bronze medal – third place	2026 Amsterdam	Coxless four
European Championships
Gold medal – first place	2025 Plovdiv	Coxless four
Silver medal – second place	2025 Plovdiv	Eight

Linn van Aanholt (born 16 March 2001) is a Dutch rower.

== Career ==
Aanholt competed at the 2025 European Rowing Championships and won a gold medal in the coxless four and a silver medal in the eight. In September 2025, she competed at the 2025 World Rowing Championships and won a gold medal in the eight with a time of 6:08.10. This was the Netherland's first gold in the event at the World Rowing Championships.

In August 2026, she competed at the 2026 World Rowing Championships and won a silver medal in the mixed eight with a time of 5:38.42 and a bronze medal in the coxless four with a time of 6:13.74.

== Personal life ==
Aanholt began her International Bachelor Economics and Business Economics (IBEB) program at Erasmus School of Economics (ESE) in 2020. She is currently pursuing her master's degree.
