= Jonna de Vries =

Dutch rower (born 1990)

Personal information
- Nationality: Dutch
- Born: 2 September 1990 (age 36)

Sport
- Country: Netherlands
- Sport: Rowing
- Event: Eight
Medal record
Women's rowing
Representing the Netherlands
World Championships
Gold medal – first place	2025 Shanghai	Eight
Gold medal – first place	2026 Amsterdam	Eight
European Championships
Silver medal – second place	2025 Plovdiv	Eight

Jonna de Vries (born 2 September 1990) is a Dutch coxswain.

== Career ==
Following a five-year break from rowing, de Vries was named the coxswain for the Dutch men's eight team in 2024. She competed at the 2025 European Rowing Championships and won a silver medal in the eight event. She then competed at the 2025 World Rowing Championships and won a gold medal in the eight with a time of 5:27.67. This was the first time the Netherlands won gold in the event at the World Rowing Championships. In August 2026, she competed at the 2026 World Rowing Championships and won a gold medal in the eight with a world best time of 5:17.75. Seven of the eight members were on the team that won their first world title in 2025.
