= Christian Tabash =

American rower (born 1999)

Personal information
- Born: May 14, 1999 (age 27) Alexandria, Virginia, U.S.
- Education: Harvard University

Sport
- Country: United States
- Sport: Rowing

Achievements and titles
- Olympic finals: Paris 2024 M8+
Medal record
Men's rowing
Representing the United States
Olympic Games
| Bronze medal – third place | 2024 Paris | Eight |
World Championships
| Bronze medal – third place | 2025 Shanghai | Eight |

Christian Tabash (born May 14, 1999) is an American rower. He competed at the 2024 Summer Olympics.

== Early and personal life ==
Tabash was born in Alexandria, Virginia to parents Katia and Peter Tabash. Tabash is Palestinian American. He attended Gonzaga College High School and Harvard University, where he graduated with a degree in government. In 2018, he worked as a research assistant to Noura Erakat. He is fluent in French and Haitian Créole.

== Career ==
He won the silver medal in the eight at the 2017 World Rowing Junior Championships and bronze in the four with coxswain at the 2021 World Rowing U23 Championships.

While taking graduate courses at University of California, Berkeley, Tabash was a member of the university's rowing team.

He won the eight at the 2024 World Rowing Final Olympic & Paralympic Qualification Regatta in Lucerne.

Tabash represented the United States at the 2024 Summer Olympics and won a bronze medal in the men's eight, with a time of 5:25.28.

At the 2025 World Rowing Championships in Shanghai, he was part of the United States team that won bronze medal in the men's eight.
