= Nika Johanna Vos =

Dutch rower (born 1998)

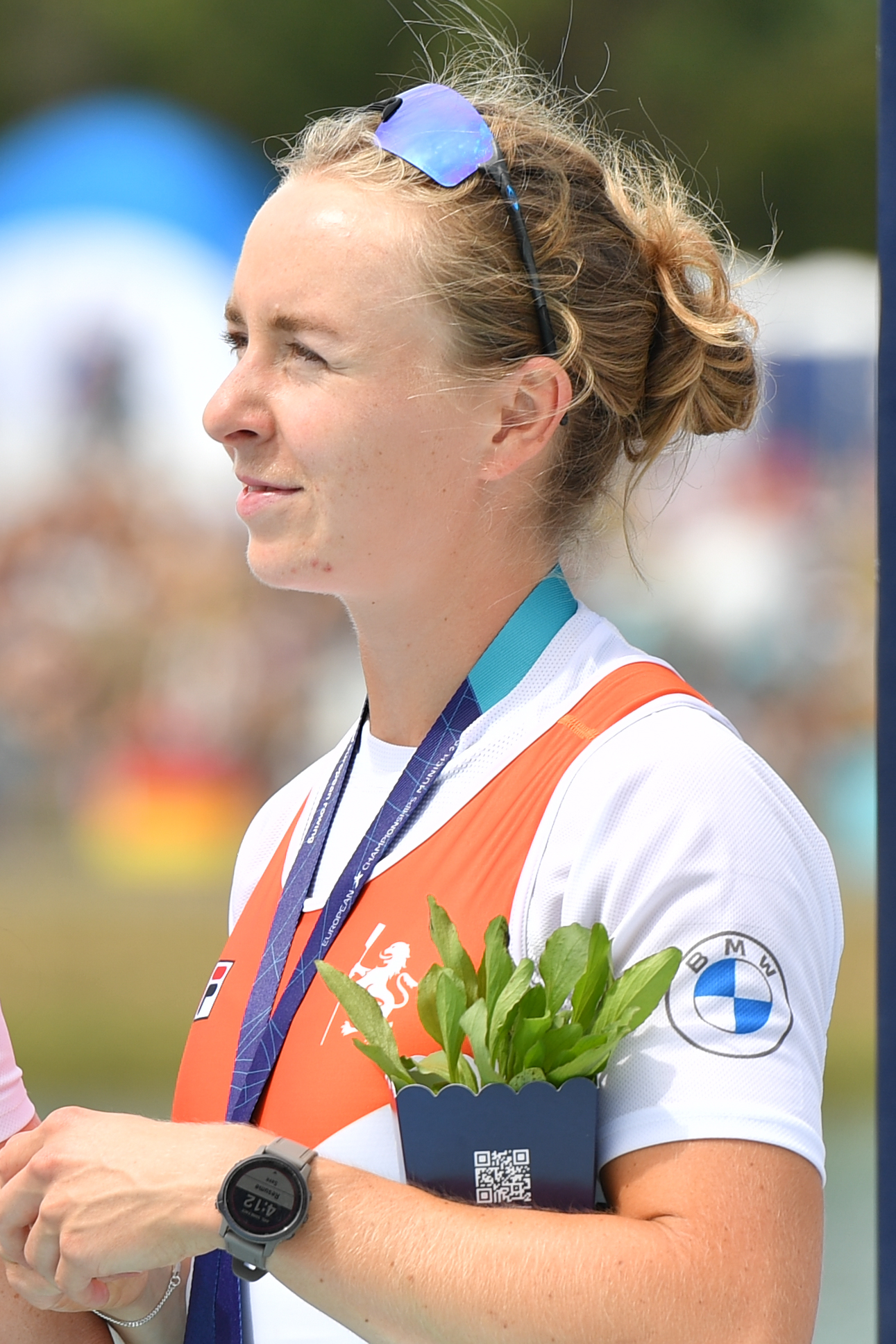
- Vos in 2022

Personal information
- Nationality: Dutch
- Born: 26 August 1998 (age 28) Breda, Netherlands
- Height: 1.77 m (5 ft 10 in)
- Weight: 72 kg (159 lb)

Sport
- Country: Netherlands
- Sport: Rowing
Medal record
Women's rowing
Representing the Netherlands
World Championships
Gold medal – first place	2025 Shanghai	Eight
Silver medal – second place	2022 Račice	Quadruple sculls
Silver medal – second place	2026 Amsterdam	Mixed eight
Bronze medal – third place	2026 Amsterdam	Coxless four
European Championships
Gold medal – first place	2025 Plovdiv	Coxless four
Silver medal – second place	2022 Oberschleißheim	Quadruple sculls
Silver medal – second place	2025 Plovdiv	Eight
Bronze medal – third place	2024 Szeged	Quadruple sculls

Nika Johanna Vos (born 26 August 1998) is a Dutch rower.

== Career ==
In August 2022, Vos competed at the 2022 European Rowing Championships and won a silver medal in the quadruple sculls. The next month she competed at the 2022 World Rowing Championships and won a silver medal in the quadruple sculls with the same crew.

In April 2024, she competed at the 2024 European Rowing Championships and won a bronze medal in the quadruple sculls. She again competed at the 2025 European Rowing Championships and won a gold medal in the coxless four and a silver medal in the eight.

In September 2025, she competed at the 2025 World Rowing Championships and won a gold medal in the eight with a time of 6:08.10. This was the Netherland's first gold in the event at the World Rowing Championships. In August 2026, she competed at the 2026 World Rowing Championships and won a silver medal in the mixed eight with a time of 5:38.42 and a bronze medal in the coxless four with a time of 6:13.74.
