= Jorn Salverda =

Dutch rower (born 1997)

Personal information
- Nationality: Dutch
- Born: 18 August 1997 (age 29)

Sport
- Country: Netherlands
- Sport: Rowing
- Event: Eight
Medal record
Men's rowing
Representing the Netherlands
World Championships
| Gold medal – first place | 2025 Shanghai | Eight |
| Gold medal – first place | 2026 Amsterdam | Eight |
European Championships
| Silver medal – second place | 2025 Plovdiv | Eight |

Jorn Salverda (born 18 August 1997) is a Dutch rower.

== Career ==
Salverda competed at the 2025 European Rowing Championships and won a silver medal in the eight event. He then competed at the 2025 World Rowing Championships and won a gold medal in the eight with a time of 5:27.67. This was the first time the Netherlands won gold in the event at the World Rowing Championships. In August 2026, he competed at the 2026 World Rowing Championships and won a gold medal in the eight with a world best time of 5:17.75. Seven of the eight members were on the team that won their first world title in 2025.
