= The Boat Race 2026 =

Annual contest between Oxford and Cambridge

- Cambridge leading Oxford near the end of the main men's race
- Date: 4 April 2026

Men's race
- Winner: Cambridge
- Margin of victory: 4 lengths
- Winning time: 17 minutes 56 seconds
- Overall record (Cambridge–Oxford): 89–81
- Umpire: Ciarán Hayes

Women's race
- Winner: Oxford
- Margin of victory: 3 lengths
- Winning time: 19 minutes 15 seconds
- Overall record (Cambridge–Oxford): 49–31
- Umpire: Clare Harvey

Reserves' races
- Men's winners: Goldie
- Women's winners: Blondie

The Boat Race 2026 was the annual rowing contest between Oxford and Cambridge universities on the River Thames on 3–4 April 2026.

Held annually, the Boat Race is contested along a 4.2-mile (6.8 km) tidal stretch of the river known as the Tideway, in south-west London. This was the 171st men's race and the 80th women's race.

Four races were held on the Friday for the lightweight and veteran crews. On the Saturday, the main races were preceded by a procession of traditional Thames boats called the Festival of Rowing. There were then four races: the Women, the Women's Reserves, the Men's Reserves and the Men. Cambridge won seven of the eight races, all except the main Women's Boat Race which was won by Oxford.

The event was watched by large crowds on the river banks and broadcast on television by Channel 4 for the first time.

== History ==
The Championship Course along which the races were conducted (historic names used)

The Boat Race is an annual side-by-side rowing competition between the University of Oxford (the "Dark Blues") and the University of Cambridge (the "Light Blues"). First held in 1829, the race usually takes place on the 4.2-mile (6.8 km) Championship Course, between Putney and Mortlake on the River Thames in south-west London.

The event is a major point of rivalry between the two universities; the race is followed by the general public throughout the United Kingdom and broadcast worldwide to an audience of millions.

== Crews ==
The crews were announced on 12 March 2026 at Somerset House and included Olympic and international rowers.

=== Men ===
Harry Geffen was the stroke in the Oxford Men’s Blue Boat. Bernard (Oxford), Mouelle (Cambridge) and Hatcher (Cambridge) were the only returning participants from last year. Both crews were dominated by postgraduate students with Underwood (Oxford), Bernard (Oxford) and Wild (Cambridge) the only undergraduates with Wild, aged 18, being one of the youngest ever competitors in the men's Blue Boat. Oxford’s four-man Fergus Pim, a 19-year-old Scot, was in his first season of rowing, having spent 4 seasons previously sculling with the Scottish World Class Start programme. Oxford's cox and president, Tobias Bernard, rowed on the Tideway while attending Westminster School. The Cambridge crew was described as their best ever and arguably the fastest eight in the world at that time with world champion class rowers in their reserve boat.

Seat	Cambridge			Oxford		
Seat	Name	Nationality	College	Name	Nationality	College
Bow	Simon Hatcher	American	Peterhouse	Felix Crabtree	British	Hertford
2	Noam Mouelle (President)	French	Hughes Hall	Julian Schöberl	Austrian	Green Templeton
3	Kyle Fram	American	Lucy Cavendish	James Fetter	British	Oriel
4	Patrick Wild	British	Peterhouse	Fergus Pim	British	New College
5	Gabriel Obholzer	British	Peterhouse	Alex Underwood	British	Pembroke
6	Alexander McClean	Australian	Hughes Hall	Jamie Arnold	Australian	Jesus
7	Will Klipstine	American	Hughes Hall	Alexander Sullivan	Australian	Oriel
Stroke	Frederik Breuer	German	Lucy Cavendish	Harry Geffen	British	Keble
Cox	Sammy Houdaigui	American	Fitzwilliam	Tobias Bernard (President)	British/French	Magdalen

=== Women ===
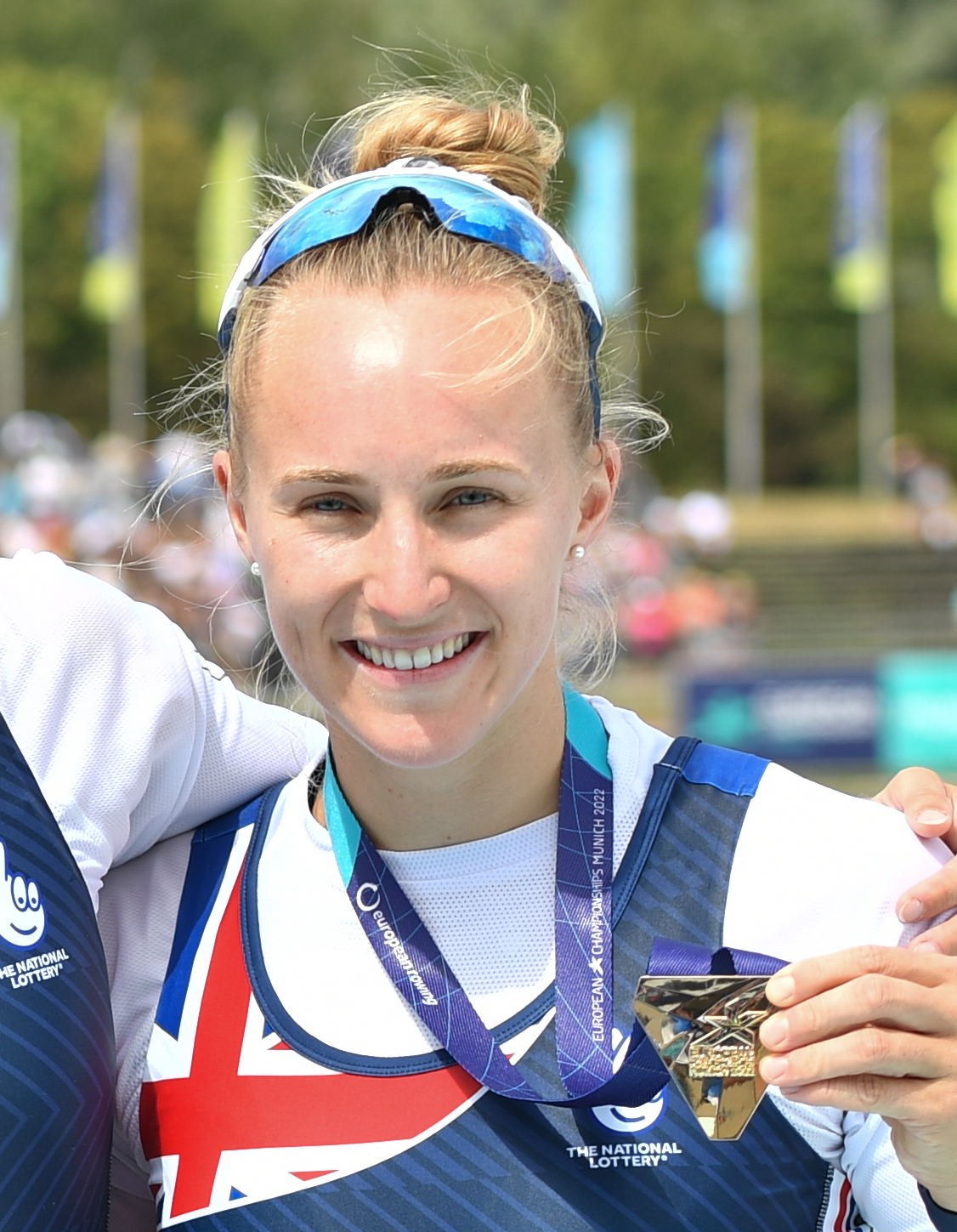
Heidi Long (pictured in 2022) – stroke of the victorious Oxford women's boat

Olympic bronze medallist Heidi Long was the stroke for the Oxford women’s Blue Boat. Spanish Olympian Esther Briz rowed for Oxford women; Kyla Delray has represented Great Britain at Junior, Under 23 and Senior level at World Rowing Championships. Cambridge stroke Aidan Wrenn-Walz has represented the USA at junior level. Camille Vandermeer was part of the USA’s World Rowing Championships’ squad last year. Gemma King, President and bow, was taking part in her seventh Boat Race – her third in the Blue Boat. The women's blue boats included two sisters in opposing crews, which previously occurred in 2004.

Seat	Cambridge			Oxford		
Seat	Name	Nationality	College	Name	Nationality	College
Bow	Gemma King (President)	British	St John's	Annie Anezakis	Australian	Pembroke
2	Isobel Campbell	British/American/Canadian	Hughes Hall	Emily Molins	American	St Hilda's
3	Charlotte Ebel	American/German	Newnham	Lilli Freischem	German	Reuben
4	Carys Earl	British/Swiss	Gonville & Caius	Julietta Camahort	American	Green Templeton
5	Antonia Galland	German	Peterhouse	Kyra Delray	British	Wolfson
6	Camille Vandermeer	American	Peterhouse	Esther Briz Zamorano	Spanish	St Edmund Hall
7	Mia Freischem	German	Darwin	Sarah Marshall	British	Nuffield
Stroke	Aidan Wrenn-Walz	American	Fitzwilliam	Heidi Long (President)	British	Lady Margaret Hall
Cox	Matt Moran	British/Swiss	Emmanuel	Louis Corrigan	British	Green Templeton

== Races ==
On Friday, 3 April, there were four races: the women's lightweight and veteran races and then the men's veteran and lightweight. Cambridge won all four races. The main races took place on Saturday, 4 April. This was the 80th women's race and the 171st men's race. The races were preceded by the Festival of Rowing – a procession of traditional boats used by Thames watermen such as skiffs.

=== Women's ===
Oxford won for the first time in 10 years by three lengths while Cambridge's Blondie won the reserves' race for the second year in a row with a winning distance of 9 lengths.

Oxford won the toss as favourites for the women's race and elected to take the Surrey station – the southern side – so giving Cambridge the northern, Middlesex side of the course. Conditions were windy and rough, with choppy water creating difficult steering and rhythm for both crews. From the start at Putney, Oxford established an immediate advantage, striking cleanly and moving ahead within the opening strokes.

By the time the crews approached Hammersmith Bridge, Oxford had built a commanding lead of several seconds, rowing confidently in the challenging conditions while Cambridge struggled to match their early pace. Despite attempts from the Light Blues to close the gap along the middle section of the course, including taking a tighter racing line on the bends, Oxford maintained control and responded to every push.

Through the long stretch towards Barnes Bridge, Cambridge made brief inroads after electing to remove themselves from the faster water in the middle of the river to be sheltered by moving closer to the bank, reducing the deficit slightly as they sought calmer water, but Oxford’s rhythm, led by president Heidi Long, remained composed. The Dark Blues resisted the challenge and continued to hold a clear advantage into the closing stages.

In the final metres, Oxford rowed through the finish with authority to win in 19 minutes 15 seconds, ending Cambridge’s eight-year winning streak in the women’s race and securing their first victory since 2016.

It was Oxford’s 31st victory in the Women’s Boat Race, reducing Cambridge’s overall lead in the event. At the finish, emotional celebrations followed as the Oxford crew marked a landmark triumph, having led from the start in one of the most decisive performances of recent years.

=== Men's ===
The Cambridge men's boat crossing the finish line.

Cambridge won the men's race for the fourth year in a row with three and a half lengths lead and Cambridge's Goldie won the reserves' race also for the fourth consecutive year with a margin of 19 lengths over Oxford.

Cambridge won the toss as the overwhelming favourites and elected to start from the Middlesex station, handing Oxford the Surrey side of the Championship Course. Conditions were still windy and overcast, with choppy water posing a significant challenge to both crews. Oxford made a competitive start, matching Cambridge’s early rhythm as the crews remained closely aligned through the opening stages from Putney.

As the boats approached Hammersmith Bridge, Cambridge began to assert control, edging ahead by a small but clear margin as their higher rhythm and cleaner water gave them the advantage. Despite Oxford’s attempts to respond along the long middle stretch of the course, the Light Blues steadily extended their lead, handling the increasingly rough conditions more effectively. By the approach to Barnes Bridge, Cambridge had stretched their advantage to over a length and continued to pull away as Oxford struggled to close the gap.

In the final stages, Cambridge maintained their dominance, rowing confidently through the closing metres to secure victory by around three and a half lengths. The winning time was reported at 17 minutes 57 seconds, underlining the strength of a crew that claimed a fourth consecutive triumph and their 89th overall victory in the men’s race.

The result continued Cambridge’s recent dominance in the event, marking their seventh win in eight years and extending their overall lead over Oxford. At the finish, the Light Blue crew celebrated in traditional fashion after a commanding performance in difficult conditions, having turned an initially close contest into a decisive victory.

== Sponsorship ==
This was the second year of title sponsorship by French luxury brand Chanel. The Chanel J12 Boat Race was named after the J12 unisex watch launched by Chanel in 2000 which was inspired by the J Class racing yachts.

== Post-race activity ==
Crew and officials at the Mortlake Anglian & Alpha Boat Club after the men's race. The boats are the umpire's launch Amaryllis and the RNLI lifeboat Hurley Burly.

The crews debarked at the Mortlake Anglian & Alpha Boat Club by Chiswick Bridge for the prize-giving and post-race hospitality.

== Coverage ==
The BBC had covered the event for almost a century since it first broadcast it on the radio in 1927, but its director of sport, Alex Kay-Jelski, did not like the event and so did not bid strongly for the rights. Instead, Channel 4 won the bidding in October 2025 for a five-year term. Times Radio won the rights for radio broadcasting, and so the BBC did not broadcast live coverage at all.

The coverage was still produced by the same production company, FilmNova, and the presentation led by Clare Balding, who had presented the event for the BBC since 2010 and had rowed herself at the Cambridge college Newnham. She was joined by Jamie Laing from Made in Chelsea and Ade Adepitan, who is a former paralympian. The main commentator was Alex Jacques, who was assisted by three Olympic rowers: Martin Cross, Jess Eddie and Pete Reed. Hannah Fry provided a report on the science of rowing.

The main men's and women's races were broadcast on Channel 4's live television channel while both reserve races were streamed live on Channel 4's YouTube channel. The live broadcast was marred by repeated airing of foul language by crew members, and presenters Balding and Laing made apologies for this during the coverage. Such swearing was not new, however, as there were similar incidents in previous years, including 2013 and 2022. Overall, the broadcast was fairly successful on the new channel, with a total UK audience of about 3 million, which peaked at about 2 million during the main men's race, giving it the largest share of the TV audience at that time, at 31.3%.
