= Wibout Rustenburg =

Dutch rower (born 1998)

Personal information
- Nationality: Dutch
- Born: 17 September 1998 (age 27)

Sport
- Country: Netherlands
- Sport: Rowing
- Event: Eight
Medal record
Men's rowing
Representing the Netherlands
World Championships
Gold medal – first place	2025 Shanghai	Eight
Gold medal – first place	2026 Amsterdam	Eight
European Championships
Silver medal – second place	2025 Plovdiv	Eight

Wibout Rustenburg (born 17 September 1998) is a Dutch rower.

== Early life and education ==
Rustenburg was born to Nico and Christine Rustenburg. His older sister, Lies Rustenburg, is also a rower who represented the Netherlands at the 2016 Summer Olympics. He earned his undergraduate degree from the University of Amsterdam before attending UC Berkeley School of Law to earn his master's degree.

== Career ==
Rustenburg competed at the 2025 European Rowing Championships and won a silver medal in the eight event. He then competed at the 2025 World Rowing Championships and won a gold medal in the eight with a time of 5:27.67. This was the first time the Netherlands won gold in the event at the World Rowing Championships. In August 2026, he competed at the 2026 World Rowing Championships and won a gold medal in the eight with a world best time of 5:17.75.
