= Gus Rodriguez =

American rower

Personal information
- Full name: Augustine Rodriguez
- Born: June 1, 1999 (age 27)
- Education: Brown University; University of California Berkeley

Sport
- Sport: Rowing
Medal record
Men's rowing
Representing United States
World Championships
Gold medal – first place	2026 Amsterdam	Coxless four
Bronze medal – third place	2025 Shanghai	Eight
Bronze medal – third place	2026 Amsterdam	Mixed eight

Augustine Rodriguez (born 1 June 1999) is an American rower. He was a gold medalist at the 2026 World Rowing Championships.

== Career ==
The son of rowers Meg and Raoul Rodriguez, his father won a silver medal at the 1988 Olympic Games in the men's eight competing his United States, while his mother, was the first female captain of Vesper Boat Club in Philadelphia.

Rodriguez attended Brown University, competing in rowing for the Brown Bears varsity team in the stroke seat. At the 2021 World Rowing U23 Championships in Račice, Rodriguez was part of the United States team that won the silver medal in the men's eight. He was named U.S. Rowing’s 2021 Under 23 Athlete of the Year. He later attended the University of California, Berkeley as a graduate, and won the 2023 intercollegiate national championship for the California Golden Bears varsity team.

Rodriguez was a reserve rower for the United States team at the 2024 Olympic Games. At the 2025 World Rowing Championships in Shanghai, he was part of the United States team that won bronze medal in the men's eight.

In August 2026, he was a gold medalist at the 2026 World Rowing Championships in Amsterdam, in the men's four.

== Personal life ==
He is of Cuban descent.
