= Willemijn Mulder =

Dutch rower (born 2000)

Personal information
- Nationality: Dutch
- Born: 20 April 2000 (age 26)

Sport
- Country: Netherlands
- Sport: Rowing
- Event: Quadruple sculls
Medal record
Women's rowing
Representing the Netherlands
World Championships
Gold medal – first place	2025 Shanghai	Quadruple sculls
European Championships
Bronze medal – third place	2024 Szeged	Quadruple sculls
Bronze medal – third place	2025 Plovdiv	Quadruple sculls
World U23 Championships
Gold medal – first place	2022 Varese	Quadruple sculls
Silver medal – second place	2021 Račice	Eight

Willemijn Mulder (born 20 April 2000) is a Dutch rower.

== Career ==
In April 2024, Mulder competed at the 2024 European Rowing Championships and won a bronze medal in the quadruple sculls. She was subsequently selected as a reserve for the 2024 Summer Olympics.

She competed at the 2025 European Rowing Championships and won a bronze medal in the quadruple sculls event. She then competed at the 2025 World Rowing Championships and won a gold medal in the quadruple sculls with a time of 6:32.92. This was the Netherland's first gold in the event at the World Rowing Championships since 2017.
