= 2022 World Rowing Junior Championships =

Rowing event

- Venue: Lake Varese
- Location: Varese, Italy
- Dates: 27–31 July

The 2022 World Rowing Junior Championships was the 55th edition of the World Rowing Junior Championships that was held from 27 to 31 July 2022 in Varese, Italy along with the 2022 World Rowing U23 Championships.

== Men's events ==
Event	Gold		Silver		Bronze	
Openweight events
Single scull (JM1x)	Marco Prati; Italy	6:50.41	Cornelius Conrad; Germany	7:01.09	Peter Strečanský; Slovakia	7:02.12
Double scull (JM2x)	Germany (b) Ole Hanack (s) Jakob Gayer	6:21.52	Turkey (b) Ahmet Kabadayı (s) Halil Köroğlu	6:22.97	Italy (b) Marco Dri (s) Marco Selva	6:24.42
Quad scull (JM4x)	Czech Republic (b) Tomáš Panchártek (2) Kryštof Janáč (3) Jakub Sprinzl (s) Ondřej Pecival	5:50.83	Italy (b) Stefano Solano (2) Maichol Brambilla (3) Matteo Belgeri (s) Marco Gandola	5:51.19	Greece (b) Panagiotis Adam (2) Apostolos Lykomitros (3) Nikolaos Cholopoulos (s) Dimitrios Papazoglou	5:53.18
Coxless pair (JM2-)	Serbia (b) Mihajlo Dedić (s) Nemanja Luledžija	6:29.64	Slovenia (b) Arne Završnik (s) Jakob Brglez	6:31.97	Germany (b) Vinzent Kuhn (s) Kieran Holthues	6:35.07
Coxless four (JM4-)	Great Britain (b) Saxon Stacey (2) Cameron Tasker (3) Joshua Brangan (s) Alexander Forbes	5:56.81	Denmark (b) Simon Mikkelsen (2) Christian Søndergaard (3) Elias Andersen (s) Tobias Bosnes	6:01.84	Romania (b) Cosmin Iulian Plesescu (2) Eduard Moldovan (3) Nicolae Stoian (s) Marian Dunca	6:03.19
Coxed four (JM4+)	Australia (b) Brandon Smith (2) Oliver St. Pierre (3) Joseph Lynch (s) Joshua Wilson (c) Ryder Taylor	6:12.91	Italy (b) Santo Zaffiro (2) Nicola Mancini (3) Jacopo Sartori (s) Giulio Zuccalà (c) Lorenzo Fanchi	6:13.44	Turkey (b) Alper Eren (2) Cevdet Mutlu (3) Eren Akbas (s) Yasin Sen (c) Ege Büyükçetin	6:15.10
Eight (JM8+)	Germany (b) Tom Hesse (2) Johannes Benien (3) Carl Sgonina (4) Tobias Strangemann (5) Moritz Müller (6) Aaron Fuchs (7) Leonhard Göz (s) Paul Stern (c) Lina Mistera	5:33.43	Great Britain (b) Matthew Johnston (2) Thomas Griffin (3) Hylton Harvey (4) Zachary Day (5) Maximilian Peel (6) Jake Birch (7) Benjamin Lundie (s) Joseph Olagundoye (c) James Trotman	5:35.36	United States (b) Andrew Cavanaugh (2) Davis Kelly (3) Luke Smith (4) Travis O'Neil (5) Jordan Dykema (6) Owen Finnerty (7) Kian Aminian (s) John Patton (c) Adam Casler	5:38.17

== Women's events ==
Event	Gold		Silver		Bronze	
Openweight events
W1x	Aikaterini Gkogkou; Greece	7:35.64	Aurora Spirito; Italy	7:41.09	Lina Kühn; Switzerland	7:41.91
W2xs	Greece (b) Sofia Dalidou (s) Styliani Natsioula	6:57.40	Italy (b) Angelica Erpini (s) Francesca Rubeo	7:02.60	Germany (b) Paula Lutz (s) Helena Brenke	7:03.15
W4x	Romania (b) Andreea Todirică (2) Iulia Nedelcu (3) Delia Gradinaciuc (s) Ana-Maria Matran	6:29.50	Germany (b) Sandrine Bartos (2) Marlene Zukunft (3) Lea Berkemeyer (s) Charlotte Luster	6:32.53	Great Britain (b) Alice McCarthy (2) Laura Burton (3) Megan Knight (s) Matilda Drewett	6:33.54
W2-	Greece (b) Ioanna Asvesta (s) Elisavet Argyraki	7:16.95	Italy (b) Sofia Naselli (s) Martina Scarpello	7:17.45	Germany (b) Lilian Albrecht (s) Leni Kötitz	7:26.40
W4-	Italy (b) Giorgia Sciattella (2) Lucrezia Monaci (3) Benedetta Pahor (s) Elisa Grisoni	6:32.76	Romania (b) Iuliana Boldea (2) Elena Mocanu (3) Andreea Dinu (s) Valentina Azoiţei	6:33.63	France (b) Léa Herscovici (2) Caroline Lagarde (3) Léontine Fouquet (s) Jeanne Sellier	6:35.64
W4+	United States (b) Ella Wheeler (2) Annika Jeffery (3) Lindsey Brail (s) Sophia Greco (c) Ella Casano	6:52.84	Italy (b) Isabella Bianchi (2) Caterina Monteggia (3) Emma Cuzzocrea (s) Alice Pettinari (c) Margherita Fanchi	6:55.09	Romania (b) Narcisa-Florentina Negură (2) Andreea Petraş (3) Beatrice Piseru (s) Georgiana Blănariu (c) Irina Despa	6:55.78
W8+	United States (b) Eugenia Rodriguez-Vazquez (2) Lily Pember (3) Sarah Bradford (4) Quincy Stone (5) Eleanor Bijeau (6) Phoebe Wise (7) Sofia Simone (s) Nora Goodwillie (c) Frances McKenzie	6:12.16	Great Britain (b) Megan Johnston (2) Isla Bathgate (3) Isla Wilding (4) Annalisa Janss (5) Alice Baker (6) Isabel Llabres Diaz (7) Madeleine Greenstock (s) Martha Stepherd (c) Sophie Wrightson	6:14.57	Germany (b) Leonie Ristow (2) Celina Grunwald (3) Tjorven Schneider (4) Lilly Waske (5) Janina Kröber (6) Florentina Riffel (7) Isabell Heine (s) Michelle Lebahn (c) Emma Mehner	6:15.05

== Medal table ==
* Host nation (Italy)

Rank	Nation	Gold	Silver	Bronze	Total
1	Greece (GRE)	3	0	1	4
2	Italy (ITA)*	2	6	1	9
3	Germany (GER)	2	2	4	8
4	United States (USA)	2	0	1	3
5	Great Britain (GBR)	1	2	1	4
6	Romania (ROU)	1	1	2	4
7	Australia (AUS)	1	0	0	1
7	Czech Republic (CZE)	1	0	0	1
7	Serbia (SRB)	1	0	0	1
10	Turkey (TUR)	0	1	1	2
11	Denmark (DEN)	0	1	0	1
11	Slovenia (SLO)	0	1	0	1
13	France (FRA)	0	0	1	1
13	Slovakia (SVK)	0	0	1	1
13	Switzerland (SUI)	0	0	1	1
Totals (15 entries)		14	14	14	42

== Participants ==
A total of 674 rowers from the national teams of the following 51 countries was registered to compete at 2022 World Rowing Junior Championships.

- Algeria (1)
- Australia (33)
- Austria (8)
- Belgium (1)
- Brazil (3)
- Bulgaria (5)
- Canada (18)
- Chile (2)
- China (23)
- Chinese Taipei (2)
- Croatia (7)
- Cyprus (4)
- Czech Republic (18)
- Denmark (11)
- Egypt (12)
- Estonia (5)
- France (20)
- Germany (54)
- Great Britain (37)
- Greece (21)
- Hungary (19)
- Ireland (8)
- Italy (54)
- Japan (5)
- Kazakhstan (3)
- Latvia (9)
- Lithuania (4)
- Mexico (4)
- Moldova (4)
- Netherlands (20)
- New Zealand (25)
- Norway (3)
- Paraguay (1)
- Peru (1)
- Poland (23)
- Puerto Rico (3)
- Romania (42)
- Serbia (18)
- Slovakia (3)
- Slovenia (6)
- South Africa (14)
- Spain (14)
- Sri Lanka (2)
- Switzerland (14)
- Thailand (4)
- Tunisia (2)
- Turkey (9)
- Ukraine (19)
- United States (54)
- Uruguay (1)
- Vanuatu (1)

== See also ==
- 2022 World Rowing Championships
- 2022 World Rowing U23 Championships
