= Pieter Quinton =

American rower (born 1998)

Pieter Gerard Quinton
Personal information
- Born: February 11, 1998 (age 28) Evanston, IL, U.S.
- Education: Harvard University; University of Washington
- Height: 6 ft 5 in (196 cm)
- Weight: 195 lb (88 kg)

Sport
- Country: United States
- Sport: Rowing
Medal record
Men's rowing
Representing the United States
Olympic Games
Bronze medal – third place	2024 Paris	Eight
World Championships
Gold medal – first place	2026 Amsterdam	Coxless four
Bronze medal – third place	2025 Shanghai	Eight
Bronze medal – third place	2026 Amsterdam	Mixed eight

Pieter Quinton (/ˈpiːtər ˈkwɪntən/ PEE-tər KWIN-tən; born February 11, 1998) is an American rower. He won a bronze medal at the 2024 Summer Olympics in the men's eight.

== Early life ==
Quinton grew up in Portland, Oregon. He started rowing in 2011 at Rose City Rowing Club. He attended Grant High School. He graduated from Harvard University in 2020, and was a graduate student at the University of Washington in 2021. Quinton was part of the Huskies' undefeated national champion boat in 2021, winning the program's 19th national title in the Varsity 8+.

== Career ==
He competed as part of the United States men's eight boat at the 2022 and 2023 World Rowing Championships.

Quinton represented the United States at the 2024 Summer Olympics and won a bronze medal in the men's eight, with a time of 5:25.28.

At the 2025 World Rowing Championships in Shanghai, he was part of the United States team that won bronze medal in the men's eight.

In August 2026, he was a gold medalist at the 2026 World Rowing Championships in Amsterdam, in the men's four.

== Personal life ==
Quinton's younger brother Philip is a professional soccer player for Real Salt Lake.
