= Jack Robertson (rower) =

Australian rower

Personal information
- Full name: James Robertson
- Nickname: Robbo
- Born: 23 January 1998 (age 28) Fitzroy, Victoria, Australia
- Home town: Melbourne, Victoria, Australia
- Education: Melbourne Grammar School; University of California, Berkeley; University of Oxford
- Height: 195 cm (6 ft 5 in)

Sport
- Country: Australia
- Sport: Rowing
- Club: Mercantile Rowing Club
- Coached by: Lyall McCarthy OAM
Medal record
Men's rowing
Representing Australia
World Championships
Bronze medal – third place	2023 Belgrade	Eight
Bronze medal – third place	2026 Amsterdam	Eight

Jack Robertson (born 23 January 1998) is an Australian representative rower. He is an Australian champion, has represented at U23 World Championships, rowed in the victorious Oxford VIII in the 2022 Boat Race and in 2023 made the Australian senior squad.

== Club, varsity and state rowing ==
Robertson attended Melbourne Grammar School where he took up rowing and was Captain of Boats in his 2016 senior year. His senior club rowing has been from Melbourne's Mercantile Rowing Club.

He first made Victorian state selection in the 2017 youth eight which competed for the Noel Wilkinson Trophy at the Interstate Regatta within the Australian Rowing Championships. In 2021 he made the Victorian men's senior eight which won the King's Cup. In 2023 he was again selected in the Victorian men's senior eight. In Mercantile colours he contested a coxless four title at the 2021 Australian Rowing Championships.

Robertson attended the University of California (Berkeley) to row and to study a Bachelor of Arts. In his Freshman and Sophomore years he raced in their second varsity eight. In 2020 he made the UCB first varsity eight for the Head of the Charles. In 2022 he undertook post-graduate studies at Oxford University and rowed to victory in the Oxford VIII in the 2022 Boat Race.

== International representative rowing ==
Robertson's Australian representative debut came in 2019 when he was selected in the Australian men's U23 eight to contest the World Rowing U23 Championships in Sarasota, Florida. That crew made the A final and finished in sixth place.

In March 2023 Robertson was selected in Australian men's senior sweep squad for the 2023 international season. At the Rowing World Cup II in Varese Italy, he rowed in the Australian men's eight. In the final after a slow start they rowed through most of the field to take second place and a silver medal. At 2023's RWC III in Lucerne, Robertson moved from the four seat into the five in the Australian men's eight. In the final they rowed stroke for stroke with their fancied Great Britain rivals but then moved away at the 1000m mark and held on for an upset gold medal victory. For the 2023 World Rowing Championships in Belgrade Serbia, the Australian men's eight was left unchanged and Robertson again raced in the five seat. They won their heat powering past the USA eight who had headed them at the 1000m mark. In the A final Australia and Great Britain traded the lead over the first 1000m, but beyond that point the result mirrored that of 2022 with Great Britain exerting dominance by the 1500m, fighting off a fast finishing Dutch eight who took silver and leaving the Australians with the bronze for the second successive year.
