= Fergus Woolnough =

British rower (born 2002)

Personal information
- Nationality: British
- Born: 8 October 2002 (age 24)

Sport
- Country: Great Britain
- Sport: Rowing
- Event: Pairs/Fours/Eights
Medal record
Men's rowing
Representing Great Britain
World Championships
| Silver medal – second place | 2025 Shanghai | Eight |
European Championships
| Gold medal – first place | 2025 Plovdiv | Eight |
World U23 Championships
| Gold medal – first place | 2023 Plovdiv | Eight |
| Gold medal – first place | 2024 St. Catharines | Coxless four |

Fergus Woolnough (born 8 October 2002) is a British rower.

== Early life ==
From Gloucestershire, he started rowing at Hartpury University and College Boat Club and joined the British Rowing World Class Start program from the age of 14 years-old. He also played rugby union as a youngster for his local club in Thornbury. He later attended Hartpury College and Oxford Brookes University.

== Career ==
Woolnough won two titles at the British Rowing Junior Championships in 2019. He won a gold medal in the men's eight at the 2023 World Rowing U23 Championships in Plovdiv, Bulgaria.

He won gold in the men’s U23 coxless four at the 2024 World Rowing Championships alongside Joshua Brangan, Harry Geffen and Jake Wincomb.

On his debut rowing for Great Britain at the senior level, he won a gold medal in the men's eight at the 2025 European Rowing Championships in Plovdiv. He also won gold as part of the British team at the World Rowing Cup in Italy in June 2025. He won a silver medal at the 2025 World Rowing Championships in Shanghai, China, in September 2025 as part of the men's eight.
