= Sam Nunn (rower) =

British rower (born 1996)

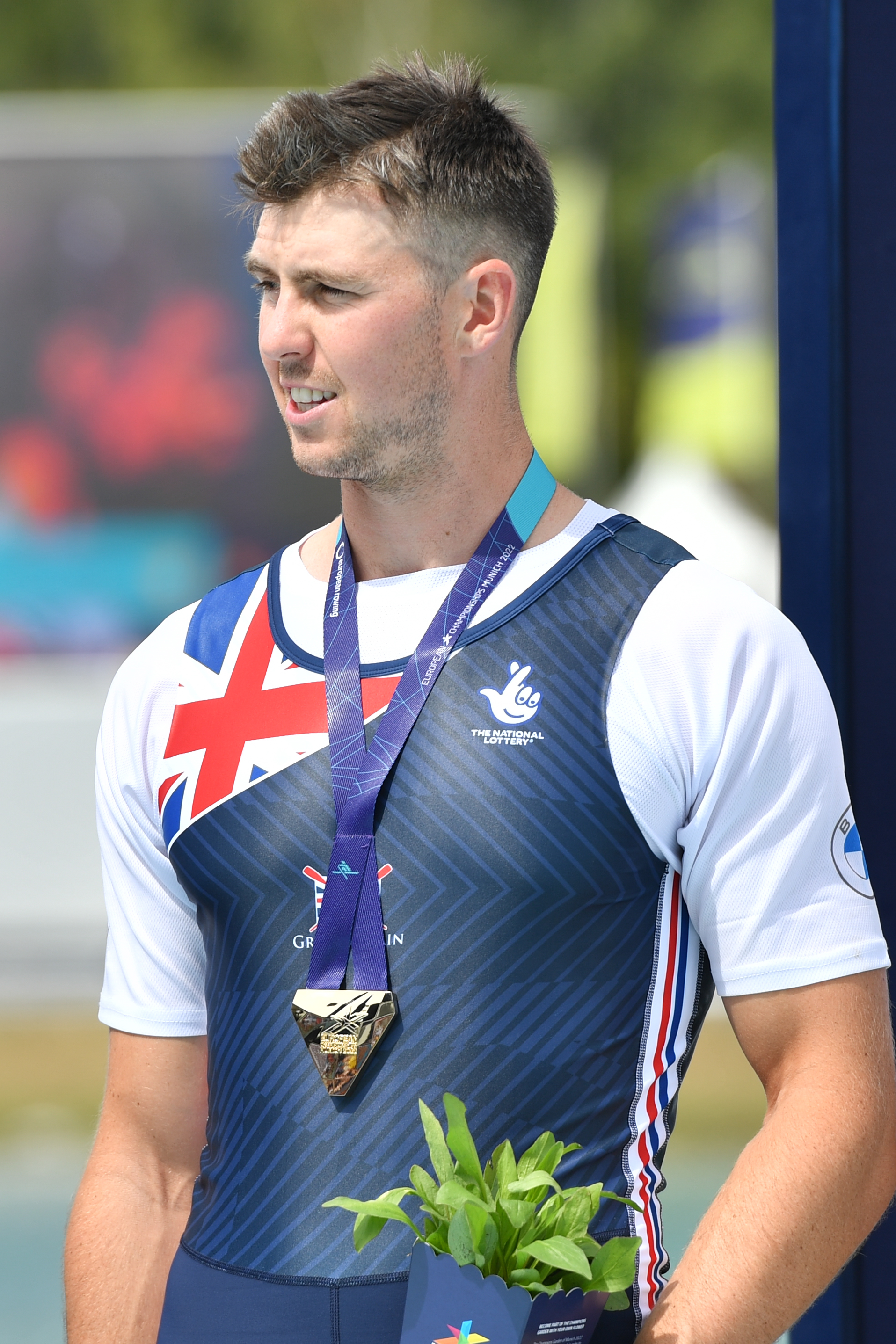
- Nunn 2022 in Munich

Personal information
- Nationality: British
- Born: 12 September 1996 (age 29)

Sport
- Country: Great Britain
- Sport: Rowing
- Event: Fours/Eights
- Club: Oxford Brookes University Boat Club
Medal record
Men's rowing
Representing Great Britain
World Championships
Gold medal – first place	2022 Racize	Coxless four
Silver medal – second place	2025 Shanghai	Eight
Silver medal – second place	2026 Amsterdam	Eight
European Championships
Gold medal – first place	2022 Munich	Coxless four
Gold medal – first place	2025 Plovdiv	Coxless eight

Sam Nunn (born 12 September 1996) is a British rower.

== Career ==
In 2021, Nunn won the Grand Challenge Cup (the blue riband event at the Henley Royal Regatta) rowing for the Oxford Brookes University Boat Club.

He became a world champion after winning the coxless four at the 2022 World Rowing Championships. He had earlier won the gold medal win in the same boat class at the 2022 European Rowing Championships.
