= Andrei Mândrilă =

Romanian rower

Personal information
- Nationality: Romanian
- Born: 28 November 2002 (age 23) Câmpulung Moldovenesc

Sport
- Sport: Rowing
Medal record
Men's rowing
Representing Romania
World Championships
Silver medal – second place	2025 Shanghai	Coxless four
European Championships
Gold medal – first place	2025 Plovdiv	Coxless four
Gold medal – first place	2026 Varese	Eight
World U23 Championships
Bronze medal – third place	2022 Varese	Coxless pair
European Championships U23
Gold medal – first place	2021 Kruszwica	Coxless four
Gold medal – first place	2022 Heindonk	Eight
Gold medal – first place	2023 Krefeld	Eight
Gold medal – first place	2023 Krefeld	Coxless pair
Gold medal – first place	2024 Edirne	Eight

Andrei Mândrilă (born 28 November 2002) is a Romanian rower. He competed in the coxless four at the 2024 Summer Olympics.

== Career ==
He represented Romania at the Olympic Games in Paris in 2024. In the four-frame event he ranked 5th, together with Ștefan Berariu, Sergiu Bejan and Ciprian Tudosă. At the European Championships in Plovdiv in 2025, they won the gold medal.

== Recognition ==
- 2025 - Honorary citizen of Craiova.
