= Mick Makker =

Dutch rower

Personal information
- Born: 5 February 1993 (age 33)

Sport
- Country: Netherlands
- Sport: Rowing
Medal record
Men's rowing
Representing NED
Olympic Games
| Silver medal – second place | 2024 Paris | Eight |
World Championships
| Gold medal – first place | 2025 Shanghai | Eight |
| Gold medal – first place | 2026 Amsterdam | Eight |
| Silver medal – second place | 2023 Belgrade | Eight |
| Silver medal – second place | 2022 Račice | Eight |
European Championships
| Silver medal – second place | 2025 Plovdiv | Eight |
| Silver medal – second place | 2022 Oberschleißheim | Eight |
| Bronze medal – third place | 2023 Bled | Eight |

Mick Makker (born 5 February 1993) is a Dutch rower. He won a silver medal in the eight at the 2023 World Rowing Championships.
