= Harry Geffen =

British rower (born 2003)

Personal information
- Nationality: British
- Born: 21 March 2003 (age 23)

Sport
- Country: Great Britain
- Sport: Rowing
- Event: Pairs/Fours/Eights
Medal record
Men's rowing
Representing Great Britain
World Championships
Silver medal – second place	2026 Amsterdam	Eight
World U23 Championships
Gold medal – first place	2022 Varese	Eight
Gold medal – first place	2023 Plovdiv	Coxless Pair
Gold medal – first place	2024 St. Catharines	Coxless four
Gold medal – first place	2025 Poznan	Eight

Harry Geffen (born 21 March 2003) is a British rower. He was a medalist at the 2026 World Rowing Championships, having previously won multiple gold medals at the World Rowing U23 Championships. He competed at The Boat Race 2026.

== Career ==
Geffen started rowing after his older brother William who competed for Oxford University Boat Club, with the pair later becoming training partners.

Geffen studied and competed at Yale University in the United States and later competed for Oxford University. Geffen was the stroke in the Oxford Men’s Blue Boat at the The Boat Race 2026. He was a multiple gold medalist competing for Great Britain at the World Rowing U23 Championships, stroking the U23 Eight to gold in 2022, before also winning gold in the Pair in 2023, and the Coxless Four in 2024, and the men’s eight in 2025.

Having competed in the men's pair at the 2025 World Rowing Championships in Shanghai, Geffen won a silver medal at the 2026 World Rowing Championships in Amsterdam, in August 2026 as part of the men's eight.
