= Archie Drummond =

British rower (born 2002)

Personal information
- Nationality: British
- Born: 14 April 2002 (age 24)

Sport
- Country: Great Britain
- Sport: Rowing
- Event: Eights
Medal record
Men's rowing
Representing Great Britain
World Championships
Silver medal – second place	2025 Shanghai	Eight
Silver medal – second place	2026 Amsterdam	Eight
European Championships
Gold medal – first place	2025 Plovdiv	Eight

Archie Drummond (born 14 April 2002) is a British rower. He was a gold medalist at the 2025 European Rowing Championships and a silver medalist at the 2025 and 2026 World Rowing Championships.

== Biography ==
Of Scottish descent, Drummond was a rugby union player and rowed as part of his rehabilitation following an injury. He began to commit full-time to rowing after joining the GB World Class Start programme in 2018.

Having trained at Twickenham Rowing Club, Drummond set British and world age-group records on the Concept 2 rowing machine and won a Pac-12 conference championship and the Windermere Cup in 2024 while competing for the University of Washington.

As part of the Great Britain's men's eight, he won the gold medal at the 2025 European Rowing Championships in Plovdiv, rowing stroke. He won the silver medal at the 2025 World Rowing Championships in Shanghai in the Men's eight.

In August 2026, he won the silver medal at the 2026 World Rowing Championships in Amsterdam in the Men's eight.
