= Fergus Hamilton =

Australian rower (born 2000)

Personal information
- Nicknames: Greg, Frog
- Nationality: Australian/ NZ / GB
- Born: 29 January 2000 (age 26) Reading, United Kingdom
- Home town: Jindera, Victoria
- Height: 200 cm (6 ft 7 in)

Sport
- Country: Australia
- Sport: Rowing
- Club: RBNTC / Mercantile / Yale
- Coached by: Lyall McCarthy
Medal record
Men's rowing
Representing Australia
World Championships
Bronze medal – third place	2026 Amsterdam	Eight
Junior World Championships
Gold medal – first place	2017 Trakai	Double sculls
U23 World Championships
Bronze medal – third place	2022 Varese	Eight

Fergus Hamilton (born 29 January 2000) is an Australian representative rower. He was a 2017 World Junior Champion, he stroked the U23 M8+ to Bronze medal at the 2022 World U23 World Rowing Championships and in 2023 he joined the Australian senior squad in the M2- and placed 8th at World Championships to qualify the M2- for 2024 Paris Olympics.

== Club and varsity rowing ==
Hamilton initially started rowing in a single scull at home on a farm dam in Gippsland until he could join the rowing program at Gippsland Grammar School. He moved to Melbourne Grammar School in Year 9 where he enjoyed a successful rowing career which included winning Victorian APS Head of the River in 2016, competing at Henley Royal Regatta in the Princess Elizabeth Cup 2016 and being nominated as Captain of Boats for 2017 which was his senior year. Fergus was selected to compete at the 2017 Junior World Rowing Championships with Cormac Kennedy-Leverett in the M2x where they won gold.

During his school years as a boarder Fergus would row with Corowa Rowing Club during his school holidays, his senior club rowing has been from Melbourne's Mercantile Rowing Club. His father Richard Hamilton rowed for Great Britain at Atlanta 1996.

In 2018 Fergus won a place at Yale University to study Anthropology. He rowed in the men's heavyweight crews in his Freshman and Sophomore years before returning to Australia during the Covid Pandemic in 2020. Fergus returned to Yale in 2021 to complete his studies and was nominated Yale Heavyweight Crew Captain in 2023. Fergus rowed in the Varsity VIII from 2019 to 2023 enjoying many wins including the Head of the Charles, Eastern Sprints and Yale Harvard regatta. He was twice named as Intercollegiate Rowing Coaches Association (IRCA) All-American crew and All-Ivy Crew.

== International representative rowing ==
Being in the varsity program at Yale, Hamilton found himself selected to Australian underage squads before having rowed for his state of Victoria. His Australian representative debut came in 2017 when selected in a double-scull to contest the Junior World Rowing Championships in Trakai, Lithuania. Racing with Cormac Kennedy-Leverett they won their heat, semi-final and final to take the Junior World Championship title.

Leading up to the 2022 World Rowing U23 Championships Hamilton stroked the U23 men's eight competing as an Australia 2 crew at the World Rowing Cup III in Lucerne. Two weeks later in that crew he won a bronze medal at the U23 World Championships in Varese.

In 2023 Hamilton was a late selection into the Australian men's senior sweep squad for the international season. At the Rowing World Cup III in Lucerne Switzerland, Hamilton raced as Australia's men's pair entrant with Simon Keenan. They won the B final for an overall seventh placing. Hamilton and Keenan were selected to race Australia's coxless pair at 2023 World Rowing Championships in Belgrade, Serbia. They won their heat, progressed through quarters and semis and ultimately placed 2nd in the B final for an overall eight place world ranking. In the process they qualified an Australian men's coxless pair for Paris 2024.
