= Lisa Bruijnincx =

Dutch rower (born 2001)

Lia Bruijnincx
Personal information
- Nationality: Dutch
- Born: 6 August 2001 (age 25)

Sport
- Country: Netherlands
- Sport: Rowing
- Event: Quadruple sculls
Medal record
Women's rowing
Representing the Netherlands
World Championships
| Gold medal – first place | 2025 Shanghai | Quadruple sculls |
| Gold medal – first place | 2026 Amsterdam | Quadruple sculls |
European Championships
| Bronze medal – third place | 2025 Plovdiv | Quadruple sculls |

Lisa Bruijnincx (born 6 August 2001) is a Dutch rower.

== Career ==
Bruijnincx competed at the 2025 European Rowing Championships and won a bronze medal in the quadruple sculls event. She then competed at the 2025 World Rowing Championships and won a gold medal in the quadruple sculls with a time of 6:32.92. This was the Netherland's first gold in the event at the World Rowing Championships since 2017.

In August 2026, she competed at the 2026 World Rowing Championships and won a gold medal in the quadruple sculls with a time of 6:08.18.
