= Jan van der Bij =

Dutch rower (born 1991)

Personal information
- Nationality: Netherlands
- Born: 25 September 1991 (age 34)

Sport
- Sport: Rowing
- Club: A.A.S.R. Skøll

Achievements and titles
- Olympic finals: Tokyo 2020 M4-
Medal record
Men's rowing
Representing Netherlands
Olympic Games
Silver medal – second place	2024 Paris	Eight
World Championships
Gold medal – first place	2025 Shanghai	Eight
Gold medal – first place	2026 Amsterdam	Eight
Silver medal – second place	2023 Belgrade	Eight
European Championships
Gold medal – first place	2020 Poznań	Coxless four
Silver medal – second place	2025 Plovdiv	Eight
Bronze medal – third place	2023 Bled	Eight

Jan van der Bij (born 25 September 1991) is a Dutch rower. He competed in the 2020 Summer Olympics, held July–August 2021 in Tokyo. He has also participated in the World Rowing Cup since 2018.
