= 2026 World Rowing Championships =

International rowing event

- Venue: Bosbaan
- Location: Amsterdam, Netherlands
- Dates: 24–30 August

The 54th World Rowing Championships were held from 24 to 30 August 2026 in Amsterdam, Netherlands, under the organization of World Rowing and the Royal Dutch Rowing Federation (KNRB).

The event took place at the Bosbaan, the venue that had previously hosted the World Rowing Championships of 1977 and 2014. The Bosbaan underwent extensive renovations in order to be ready for the 2026 championship.

Unlike all previous World Rowing Championships, the event had a dual leadership. Former Olympic champions Ilse Paulis and Nico Rienks jointly took on the role of Regatta Director.

== Medal summary ==
=== Medal table ===
* Host nation (Netherlands)

Rank	Nation	Gold	Silver	Bronze	Total
1	Netherlands*	4	3	3	10
2	Germany	3	2	0	5
3	United States	3	0	6	9
4	Romania	3	0	0	3
5	Great Britain	2	4	2	8
6	Mexico	2	0	1	3
7	Ireland	1	2	0	3
8	Ukraine	1	1	1	3
9	Greece	1	1	0	2
10	Italy	1	0	1	2
11	New Zealand	1	0	0	1
11	Uzbekistan	1	0	0	1
13	Australia	0	3	2	5
–	Individual Neutral Athletes	0	2	0	2
14	Belgium	0	1	1	2
14	France	0	1	1	2
16	China	0	1	0	1
16	Serbia	0	1	0	1
16	Uruguay	0	1	0	1
19	Switzerland	0	0	2	2
20	Israel	0	0	1	1
20	Norway	0	0	1	1
20	Tunisia	0	0	1	1
Totals (22 entries)		23	23	23	69

Non-Olympic/Paralympic classes

=== Men ===
Event	Gold		Silver		Bronze	
Openweight events
M1x	Oliver Zeidler; Germany	6:35.22	Yauheni Zalaty; Individual Neutral Athletes 1	6:38.33	Jonas Juel; Norway	6:44.03
M2x	Netherlands (b) Melvin Twellaar (s) Simon van Dorp	6:04.42	Serbia (b) Martin Mačković (s) Nikolaj Pimenov	6:07.58	Belgium (b) Aaron Andries (s) Tibo Vyvey	6:09.73
M4x	Italy (b) Luca Chiumento (2) Andrea Panizza (3) Luca Rambaldi (S) Giacomo Gentili	5:33.60	Germany (b) Marc Weber (2) Felix Heinrich (3) Jonas Gelsen (S) Ole Hohensee	5:34.46	Great Britain (b) Cedol Dafydd (2) Callum Dixon (3) Tobias Schroder (S) Rory Harris	5:35.40
M2−	New Zealand (b) Oliver Welch (s) Benjamin Taylor	6:21.93	Australia (b) Angus Dawson (s) Alexander Hill	6:23.87	Italy (b) Matteo Lodo (s) Giovanni Codato	6:27.45
M4−	United States (b) Gus Rodriguez (2) Peter Chatain (3) Christopher Carlson (S) Pieter Quinton	5:41.57	Netherlands (b) Lennart van Lierop (2) Gert-Jan van Doorn (3) Eli Brouwer (S) Rik Rienks	5:41.84	Great Britain (b) Daniel Graham (2) James Robson (3) Douwe de Graaf (S) George Bourne	5:44.16
M8+	Netherlands; Ralf Rienks; Finn Florijn; Wibout Rustenburg; Jorn Salverda; Sander de Graaf; Pieter van Veen; Jan van der Bij; Mick Makker; Jonna de Vries (F) (c)	5:17.75	Great Britain; William Stewart; Matthew Rowe; Gabriel Obholzer; Sam Nunn; David Bewicke-Copley; Harry Geffen; Miles Beeson; Archie Drummond; Tom Bryce (c)	5:17.81	Australia; Rohan Lavery; Austin Reinehr; Alex Nichol; Jack Robertson; Harry Manton; Fergus Hamilton; Patrick Long; Mitch Salisbury; Nicholas Dunlop (c)	5:18.28
Lightweight events
LM1x	Petros Gkaidatzis; Greece	6:47.77	Felipe Klüver; Uruguay	6:51.50	Alexis López; Mexico	6:52.06
LM2x	Uzbekistan (b) Shakhzod Nurmatov (s) Sobirjon Safaroliev	6:21.93	Germany (b) Naveen Shah (s) Maximilian Rühling	6:23.87	United States (b) Jamie Copus (s) Sean Richardson	6:27.45

=== Women ===
Event	Gold		Silver		Bronze	
Openweight events
W1x	Lauren Henry; Great Britain	7:15.93	Fiona Murtagh; Ireland	7:18.04	Karolien Florijn; Netherlands	7:18.84
W2x	Ireland (b) Zoe Hyde (s) Margaret Cremen	6:43.48	Netherlands (b) Roos de Jong (s) Benthe Boonstra	6:44.51	Switzerland (b) Salome Ullrich (s) Fabienne Schweizer	6:48.51
W4x	Netherlands (b) Marieke Keijser (2) Lisa Bruijnincx (3) Margot Leeuwenburgh (S) Tessa Dullemans	6:08.18	Great Britain (b) Lola Anderson (2) Hannah Scott (3) Finnola Stratton (S) Imogen Grant	6:09.78	United States (b) Kristina Wagner (2) Evan Park (3) Sophia Vitas (S) Emily Kallfelz	6:10.33
W2−	Romania (b) Adriana Adam (s) Simona Radiș	6:49.86	France (b) Emma Cornelis (s) Hezekia Peron	6:56.21	United States (b) Regina Salmons (s) Mia Levy	6:59.76
W4−	United States (b) Molly Bruggeman (2) Azja Czajkowski (3) Teal Cohen (S) Kaitlin Knifton	6:09.87	Australia (b) Giorgia Patten (2) Bronwyn Cox (3) Jacqueline Swick (S) Georgina Rowe	6:12.40	Netherlands (b) Ymkje Clevering (2) Nika Johanna Vos (3) Linn van Aanholt (S) Tinka Offereins	6:13.74
W8+	Romania; Cristina Drugă; Geanina Dumitrița Juncănariu; Ancuța Bodnar; Maria Lehaci; Maria-Magdalena Rusu; Amalia Chelaru; Adriana Adam; Simona Radiș; Victoria-Ștefania Petreanu (c)	5:51.88	United Kingdom; Elizabeth Witt; Jade Lindo; Amelia Standing; Katherine George; Lauren Irwin; Eve Stewart; Heidi Long; Annie Campbell-Orde; Jack Tottem (M) (c)	5:52.76	United States; Dahlia Levine; Megan Lee; Charlotte Buck; Jess Thoennes; Claire Collins; Camille Vandermeer; Alexandria Vallancey-Martinson; Etta Carpender; Nina Castagna (c)	5:53.76
Lightweight events
LW1x	Kenia Lechuga; Mexico	7:29.16	Mariia Zhovner; Individual Neutral Athletes 1	7:32.73	Femke van de Vliet; Netherlands	7:35.56
LW2x	Mexico (b) Aylin Ibarra (s) Melissa Márquez	7:10.02	Greece (b) Paschalina Mouratidou (s) Gavriela Lioliou	7:12.05	Tunisia (b) Khadija Krimi (s) Selma Dhaouadi	7:14.90

=== Mixed ===
Event	Gold		Silver		Bronze	
Mix2x	Netherlands; Roos de Jong; Simon van Dorp	6:15.80	Ireland; Konan Pazzaia; Margaret Cremen	6:22.34	United States; Sophia Vitas; Cedar Cunningham	6:22.75
Mix8+	Romania; Cristina Drugă; Amalia Chelaru; Adriana Adam; Florin Lehaci; Cosmin Iulian Plesescu; Ciprian Tudosă; Ștefan Berariu; Simona Radiș; Victoria-Ștefania Petreanu (F) (c)	5:35.75	Netherlands; Linn van Aanholt; Nika Johanna Vos; Ymkje Clevering; Gert-Jan van Doorn; Lennart van Lierop; Eli Brouwer; Rik Rienks; Tinka Offereins; Richelle Rietdijk (F) (c)	5:38.42	United States; Molly Bruggeman; Azja Czajkowski; Teal Cohen; Gus Rodríguez; Peter Chatain; Chris Carlson; Pieter Quinton; Kate Knifton; Rachel Rane (F) (c)	5:38.61

=== Pararowing ===
Event	Gold		Silver		Bronze	
PR1M1x	Benjamin Pritchard; Great Britain	8:50.46	Erik Horrie; Australia	8:57.27	Roman Polianskyi; Ukraine	9:01.38
PR1W1x	Anna Sheremet; Ukraine	9:48.91	Laurence Vandevyver; Belgium	10:17.77	Claire Ghiringhelli; Switzerland	10:39.76
PR2Mix2x	Germany (b) Jasmina Bier (s) Paul Umbach	8:08.26	China (b) Liu Shuang (s) Jiang Jijian	8:09.24	Israel (b) Shahar Milfelder (s) Saleh Shahin	8:14.46
PR3Mix2x	Germany (b) Valentin Luz (s) Kathrin Marchand	7:03.97	Ukraine (b) Stanislav Samoliuk (s) Dariia Kotyk	7:09.28	Australia (b) Ella Marshall (s) Sam Stunell	7:12.56
PR3Mix4+	United States (b) Gabriella Bigler (2) Skylar Dahl (3) Maxwell Allemeier (s) Alex Flynn (c) Hannah Diaz	6:46.60	Great Britain (b) Francesca Allen (2) Charlotte Coburn (3) Jonty Ridley (s) Joshua O'Brien (c) Omar Al-Miqdadi	6:47.87	France (b) Eva David (2) Helene Balzac (3) Grégoire Bireau (s) Laurent Cadot (c) Maiwenn Dumont	6:50.73
