= Giovanni Abagnale =

Italian rower (born 1995)

Personal information
- Born: 11 January 1995 (age 31) Gragnano, Italy

Sport
- Sport: Rowing
- Club: G.S. Marina Militare
Medal record
Men's rowing
Representing Italy
Olympic Games
Bronze medal – third place	2016 Rio de Janeiro	Coxless pair
World Championships
Silver medal – second place	2017 Sarasota	Coxless four
European Championships
Gold medal – first place	2017 Račice	Coxless four
Silver medal – second place	2024 Szeged	Coxless four
Bronze medal – third place	2014 Belgrade	Coxless four
Bronze medal – third place	2025 Plovdiv	Coxless eight
Bronze medal – third place	2026 Varese	Eight

Giovanni Abagnale (born 11 January 1995) is an Italian rower. He competed in the men's coxless pair event at the 2016 Summer Olympics. and the coxless Pair at the 2020 Summer Olympics.

He won a silver medal at the 2017 World Rowing Championships in the coxless four. Abagnale is an athlete of the Gruppo Sportivo della Marina Militare.
