= David Bewicke-Copley =

British rower (born 1997)

Personal information
- Nationality: British
- Born: 21 September 1997 (age 28)

Sport
- Country: Great Britain
- Sport: Rowing
- Event: Eights
- Club: Oxford Brookes University Boat Club
Medal record
Men's rowing
Representing Great Britain
World Championships
Gold medal – first place	2022 Račice	Eight
Silver medal – second place	2025 Shanghai	Eight
Silver medal – second place	2026 Amsterdam	Eight
European Championships
Gold medal – first place	2022 Munich	Eight

David Bewicke-Copley (born 21 September 1997) is a British representative rower. He was a 2022 world champion and has twice won the Grand Challenge Cup at Henley.

== School, varsity and club rowing ==
Bewicke-Copley is the eldest son of the 7th Baron Cromwell. He was educated at Eton College where he took up rowing. He attended Princeton University and was part of their elite senior rowing program. When he competed for (and won) the Grand Challenge Cup (the blue riband event at the Henley Royal Regatta) in both 2021 and 2022 he raced in Oxford Brookes University Boat Club colours. He stroked that 2021 Grand Challenge Cup winning crew.

== Representative career ==
Bewicke-Copley first earnt representative honours for Great Britain in 2016 when he was selected in the GB men's eight to contest the 2016 Under 23 World Rowing Championships. He made four consecutive representative appearances in the GB U23 men's eight at the U23 World Championships of 2016, 2017, 2018 and 2019 winning one bronze, two silver and a gold medal (in 2019).

Bewicke-Copley was selected into the three seat of the Great Britain senior eight for the World Rowing Cup I and III of 2022 where both those crews took gold as well as at the 2022 European Rowing Championships that season. Unchanged, that crew went to the 2022 World Rowing Championships where they won their heat and led over the full course in the final to claim the senior world champion eights title at the 2022 World Rowing Championships, Great Britain's first such win since 2015.

Bewicke-Copley was the only member of the 2022 GB world champion men's eight who did not return to the crew in 2023 to defend their title.
