= 2025 World Rowing Championships =

International rowing event

- Venue: Dianshan Lake
- Location: Shanghai, China
- Dates: 21–28 September

The World Rowing Championships were the 53rd edition, held from 21 to 28 September 2025 in Shanghai, China, under the organization of the International Federation of Rowing Societies (FISA) and the Chinese Rowing Federation.

Shanghai was supposed to hold the 2021 World Rowing Championships at the Shanghai Water Sports Centre on Dianshan Lake, but the competition was cancelled due to the COVID-19 pandemic. The 2025 event used the venue that had been chosen for the 2021 competition. The competition consisted of all 12 Olympic flatwater events (but not coastal rowing), and a full programme of Paralympic pararowing events. in addition to a further series of non-Olympic lightweight events, and mixed sex events for able-bodied rowers.

== Medal summary ==
=== Medal table ===
* Host nation (China)

Rank	Nation	Gold	Silver	Bronze	Total
1	Netherlands	4	1	1	6
2	Great Britain	3	4	1	8
3	China*	3	3	1	7
4	Romania	2	4	0	6
5	Ireland	2	0	2	4
5	United States	2	0	2	4
7	Germany	1	2	3	6
8	Ukraine	1	2	0	3
9	Italy	1	1	0	2
10	New Zealand	1	0	2	3
11	Poland	1	0	1	2
12	Greece	1	0	0	1
12	Uruguay	1	0	0	1
14	Austria	0	1	0	1
14	France	0	1	0	1
14	Indonesia	0	1	0	1
14	Serbia	0	1	0	1
14	South Korea	0	1	0	1
14	Tunisia	0	1	0	1
20	Australia	0	0	2	2
20	Individual Neutral Athletes	0	0	2	2
20	Switzerland	0	0	2	2
23	Denmark	0	0	1	1
23	Israel	0	0	1	1
23	Mexico	0	0	1	1
23	Peru	0	0	1	1
Totals (26 entries)		23	23	23	69

Non-Olympic/Paralympic classes

=== Medalists ===
==== Men ====
Event	Gold		Silver		Bronze	
Openweight events
M1x	Stefanos Ntouskos; Greece	6:36.75	Oliver Zeidler; Germany	6:37.17	Yauheni Zalaty; Individual Neutral Athletes	6:38.60
M2x	Poland (b) Mirosław Ziętarski (s) Mateusz Biskup	6:11.97	Serbia (b) Martin Mačković (s) Nikolaj Pimenov	6:13.57	Ireland (b) Philip Doyle (s) Fintan McCarthy	6:15.13
M4x	Italy (b) Luca Chiumento (2) Luca Rambaldi (3) Andrea Panizza (s) Giacomo Gentili	5:48.08	Great Britain (b) Cedol Dafydd (2) Callum Dixon (3) Matt Haywood (s) Rory Harris	5:50.06	Poland (b) Dominik Czaja (2) Piotr Płomiński (3) Jakub Woźniak (s) Konrad Domański	5:51.34
M2−	New Zealand (b) Oliver Welch (s) Benjamin Taylor	6:37.87	Romania (b) Florin Arteni (s) Florin Lehaci	6:42.85	Switzerland (b) Jonah Plock (s) Patrick Brunner	6:43.84
M4−	Great Britain (b) Daniel Graham (2) James Robson (3) Douwe De Graaf (s) George Bourne	5:48.48	Romania (b) Ștefan Berariu (2) Sergiu Bejan (3) Andrei Mândrilă (s) Ciprian Tudosă	5:50.56	Netherlands (b) Lennart van Lierop (2) Melvin Twellaar (3) Guillaume Krommenhoek (s) Gert-Jan van Doorn	5:52.01
M8+	Netherlands; Eli Brouwer; Finn Florijn; Wibout Rustenburg; Jorn Salverda; Sander de Graaf; Pieter van Veen; Jan van der Bij; Mick Makker; Jonna de Vries (F) (c)	5:27.67	Great Britain; William Stewart; Archie Drummond; David Bewicke-Copley; Fergus Woolnough; Miles Beeson; Samuel Nunn; Matt Aldridge; Matthew Rowe; William Denegri (c)	5:29.93	United States; Christian Tabash; Jacob Hudgins; Michael Herman; Alexander Hedge; Madison Molitor; Billy Bender; Gus Rodríguez; Pieter Quinton; Rachel Rane (F) (c)	5:30.09
Lightweight events
LM1x	Felipe Klüver; Uruguay	6:54.10	Julian Schöberl; Austria	6:57.85	Jacob McCarthy; Ireland	6:59.07
LM2x	China (b) Li Yawei (s) Sun Man	6:44.90	Indonesia (b) Ali Mardiansyah (s) Rafiq Wijdan Yasir	6:47.40	Germany (b) Joachim Agne (s) Paul Maissenhälter	6:50.24

==== Women ====
Event	Gold		Silver		Bronze	
Openweight events
W1x	Fiona Murtagh; Ireland	7:12.27	Lauren Henry; Great Britain	7:12.30	Frida Sanggaard Nielsen; Denmark	7:15.89
W2x	Netherlands (b) Roos de Jong (s) Benthe Boonstra	6:49.34	China (b) Chen Yunxia (s) Zhang Ling	6:50.22	Individual Neutral Athletes (b) Tatsiana Klimovich (s) Alena Furman	6:53.26
W4x	Netherlands (b) Lisa Bruijnincx (2) Margot Leeuwenburgh (3) Willemijn Mulder (s) Tessa Dullemans	6:32.92	Great Britain (b) Sarah McKay (2) Hannah Scott (3) Lola Anderson (s) Becky Wilde	6:34.52	Germany (b) Sarah Wibberenz (2) Frauke Hundeling (3) Lisa Gutfleisch (s) Pia Greiten	6:36.00
W2−	Romania (b) Maria Magdalena Rusu (s) Simona Radiș	7:08.52	France (b) Emma Cornelis (s) Hézékia Péron	7:13.31	United States (b) Jessica Thoennes (s) Holly Drapp	7:13.93
W4−	United States (b) Camille Vandermeer (2) Azja Czajkowski (3) Teal Cohen (s) Kaitlin Knifton	6:27.71	Romania (b) Ancuța Bodnar (2) Dumitrița Juncănariu (3) Adriana Adam (s) Amalia Bereș	6:28.44	New Zealand (b) Juliette Lequeux (2) Rebecca Leigh (3) Isla Blake (s) Alana Sherman	6:31.11
W8+	Netherlands; Linn van Aanholt; Nika Johanna Vos; Lisanne Van Der Lelij; Vera Sneijders; Hermijntje Drenth; Ilse Kolkman; Ymkje Clevering; Tinka Offereins; Dieuwke Fetter (c)	6:08.10	Romania; Cristina Druga; Roxana Anghel; Iulia-Liliana Balauca; Maria Lehaci; Ancuța Bodnar; Dumitrița Juncănariu; Adriana Adam; Amalia Bereș; Victoria-Ștefania Petreanu (c)	6:10.83	Great Britain; Eleanor Brinkhoff; Juliette Perry; Amelia Standing; Martha Birtles; Lauren Irwin; Eve Stewart; Heidi Long; Megan Slabbert; Jack Tottem (M) (c)	6:12.66
Lightweight events
LW1x	Michelle Sechser; United States	7:30.14	Pan Dandan; China	7:30.45	Kenia Lechuga; Mexico	7:32.23
LW2x	China (b) Zou Jiaqi (s) Fu Ling	7:26.12	Tunisia (b) Khadija Krimi (s) Selma Dhaouadi	7:40.90	Peru (b) Alessia Palacios (s) Valeria Palacios	7:46.04

=== Mixed ===
Event	Gold		Silver		Bronze	
Mix2x	Ireland (b) Fintan McCarthy (s) Margaret Cremen	6:24.22	Netherlands (b) Roos de Jong (s) Melvin Twellaar	6:24.91	Switzerland (b) Celia Dupre (s) Raphael Ahumada	6:27.18
Mix8+	Romania; Maria Magdalena Rusu; Maria Lehaci; Andrada-Maria Moroșanu; Florin Lehaci; Florin Arteni; Ciprian Tudosă; Ștefan Berariu; Simona Radiș; Victoria-Ștefania Petreanu (c)	5:34.46	Italy; Laura Meriano; Elisa Mondelli; Aisha Rocek; Alice Codato; Giacomo Gentili; Andrea Panizza; Nunzio Di Colandrea; Giovanni Codato; Alessandra Faella (c)	5:39.58	New Zealand; Isla Blake; Juliette Lequeux; Rebecca Leigh; Flynn Eliadis-Watson; Campbell Crouch; Benjamin Taylor; Oliver Welch; Alana Sherman; Harrison Molloy (c)	5:41.06

=== Pararowing ===
Event	Gold		Silver		Bronze	
PR1M1x	Benjamin Pritchard; Great Britain	8:55.65	Roman Polianskyi; Ukraine	9:02.74	Erik Horrie; Australia	9:04.10
PR1W1x	Anna Sheremet; Ukraine	10:18.49	Kim Se-jeong; South Korea	10:47.53	Shao Shasha; China	10:50.78
PR2Mix2x	China (b) Liu Shuang (s) Jiang Jijian	8:07.75	Germany (b) Jasmina Bier (s) Paul Umbach	8:15.58	Israel (b) Shahar Milfelder (s) Saleh Shahin	8:17.15
PR3Mix2x	Germany; Valentin Luz; Kathrin Marchand	6:58.64	Ukraine; Stanislav Samoliuk; Dariia Kotyk	7:05.33	Australia; Lisa Greissl; Sam Stunell	7:06.60
PR3Mix4+	Great Britain (b) Francesca Allen (2) Giedrė Rakauskaitė (3) Edward Fuller (s) Joshua O'Brien (c) Tom Bryce	6:52.12	China (b) Wang Xixi (2) Zeng Wanbin (3) Wu Yunlong (s) Jiang Lingtao (c) Yu Li	6:59.06	Germany (b) Kathrin Marchand (2) Hermine Krumbein (3) Philipp Dosse (s) Marc Lembeck (c) Inga Thöne	7:04.98

== Participating nations ==
672 rowers from 56 countries participated:

- Australia (41)
- Austria (3)
- Belgium (4)
- Brazil (12)
- Canada (26)
- Chile (26)
- China (56) (host)
- Croatia (9)
- Czech Republic (17)
- Denmark (14)
- Egypt (3)
- Estonia (3)
- France (24)
- Georgia (2)
- Germany (46)
- Ghana (1)
- Great Britain (48)
- Greece (6)
- Hong Kong (12)
- Hungary (2)
- India (2)
- Individual Neutral Athletes (13)
- Indonesia (6)
- Iraq (2)
- Ireland (22)
- Israel (2)
- Italy (40)
- Japan (9)
- Kazakhstan (4)
- Kuwait (2)
- Lithuania (10)
- Malaysia (5)
- Mexico (7)
- Moldova (1)
- Netherlands (35)
- New Zealand (18)
- Norway (4)
- Peru (3)
- Poland (31)
- Romania (40)
- Serbia (4)
- Slovenia (1)
- South Africa (5)
- South Korea (8)
- Spain (22)
- Sudan (1)
- Sweden (4)
- Switzerland (15)
- Togo (1)
- Tunisia (5)
- Turkey (4)
- Ukraine (18)
- United States (44)
- Uruguay (3)
- Uzbekistan (11)
