= 2019 World Rowing Championships – Men's quadruple sculls =

Men's quadruple sculls at the 2019 World Rowing Championships
- Venue: Linz-Ottensheim
- Location: Ottensheim, Austria
- Dates: 25–31 August
- Competitors: 68 from 17 nations
- Winning time: 5:51.75

Medalists
gold medal	Dirk Uittenbogaard; Abe Wiersma; Tone Wieten; Koen Metsemakers	Netherlands
silver medal	Dominik Czaja; Wiktor Chabel; Szymon Pośnik; Fabian Barański	Poland
bronze medal	Filippo Mondelli; Andrea Panizza; Luca Rambaldi; Giacomo Gentili	Italy

The men's quadruple sculls competition at the 2019 World Rowing Championships took place at the Linz-Ottensheim regatta venue. A top-eight finish ensured qualification for the Tokyo Olympics.

== Schedule ==
The schedule was as follows:

Date	Time	Round
Sunday 25 August 2019	12:36	Heats
Tuesday 27 August 2019	10:42	Repechages
Thursday 29 August 2019	12:42	Semifinals A/B
Saturday 31 August 2019	10:35	Final C
Saturday 31 August 2019	12:36	Final B
Saturday 31 August 2019	15:30	Final A

All times are Central European Summer Time (UTC+2)

== Results ==
=== Heats ===
The two fastest boats in each heat advanced directly to the A/B semifinals. The remaining boats were sent to the repechages.

==== Heat 1 ====
Rank	Rowers	Country	Time	Notes
1	Hamish Playfair; Campbell Watts; Cameron Girdlestone; David Watts	Australia	5:51.32	SA/B
2	Karl Schulze; Timo Piontek; Max Appel; Hans Gruhne	Germany	5:53.45	SA/B
3	Erik Solbakken; Martin Helseth; Jan Helvig; Olaf Tufte	Norway	5:57.18	R
4	Jonathan Walton; Angus Groom; Jack Beaumont; Peter Lambert	Great Britain	5:59.28	R
5	Dmytro Mikhay; Serhiy Hryn; Oleksandr Nadtoka; Ivan Dovhodko	Ukraine	6:19.46	R
6	Žygimantas Gališanskis; Rolandas Maščinskas; Dominykas Jančionis; Aurimas Adomavičius	Lithuania	6:21.03	R

==== Heat 2 ====
Rank	Rowers	Country	Time	Notes
1	Dominik Czaja; Wiktor Chabel; Szymon Pośnik; Fabian Barański	Poland	5:51.16	SA/B
2	Ilya Kondratyev; Artyom Kosov; Nikolay Pimenov; Pavel Sorin	Russia	5:52.46	SA/B
3	Yi Xudi; Zang Ha; Liu Dang; Zhang Quan	China	5:52.67	R
4	John Graves; Gregory Ansolabehere; Tristan Amberger; Michael Knippen	United States	5:56.95	R
5	Thomas Lehner; Armin Auerbach; Julian Brabec; Joerg Auerbach	Austria	6:04.61	R
6	Alexandru Maşnic; Ivan Corșunov; Chirill Visotchi-Sestacov; Alexandr Bulat	Moldova	6:17.56	R

==== Heat 3 ====
Rank	Rowers	Country	Time	Notes
1	Dirk Uittenbogaard; Abe Wiersma; Tone Wieten; Koen Metsemakers	Netherlands	5:47.00	SA/B
2	Filippo Mondelli; Andrea Panizza; Luca Rambaldi; Giacomo Gentili	Italy	5:54.11	SA/B
3	Nathan Flannery; Lewis Hollows; Cameron Crampton; Jordan Parry	New Zealand	5:57.39	R
4	Kaur Kuslap; Allar Raja; Tõnu Endrekson; Kaspar Taimsoo	Estonia	6:07.17	R
5	Thibaud Turlan; Guillaume Turlan; Stanislas Desgrippes; Maxime Ducret	France	6:12.33	R

=== Repechages ===
The three fastest boats in each repechage advanced to the A/B semifinals. The remaining boats were sent to the C final.

==== Repechage 1 ====
Rank	Rowers	Country	Time	Notes
1	Erik Solbakken; Martin Helseth; Jan Helvig; Olaf Tufte	Norway	5:47.08	SA/B
2	Kaur Kuslap; Allar Raja; Tõnu Endrekson; Kaspar Taimsoo	Estonia	5:48.93	SA/B
3	Yi Xudi; Zang Ha; Liu Dang; Zhang Quan	China	5:50.93	SA/B
4	Thomas Lehner; Armin Auerbach; Julian Brabec; Joerg Auerbach	Austria	5:53.83	FC
5	Žygimantas Gališanskis; Rolandas Maščinskas; Dominykas Jančionis; Aurimas Adomavičius	Lithuania	6:05.46	FC

==== Repechage 2 ====
Rank	Rowers	Country	Time	Notes
1	Jonathan Walton; Angus Groom; Jack Beaumont; Peter Lambert	Great Britain	5:45.41	SA/B
2	Nathan Flannery; Lewis Hollows; Cameron Crampton; Jordan Parry	New Zealand	5:47.13	SA/B
3	Dmytro Mikhay; Serhiy Hryn; Oleksandr Nadtoka; Ivan Dovhodko	Ukraine	5:47.54	SA/B
4	John Graves; Gregory Ansolabehere; Tristan Amberger; Michael Knippen	United States	5:48.80	FC
5	Thibaud Turlan; Guillaume Turlan; Stanislas Desgrippes; Maxime Ducret	France	5:52.64	FC
6	Alexandru Maşnic; Alexandr Bulat; Ivan Corșunov; Chirill Visotchi-Sestacov	Moldova	5:58.27	FC

=== Semifinals ===
The three fastest boats in each semi advanced to the A final. The remaining boats were sent to the B final.

==== Semifinal 1 ====
Rank	Rowers	Country	Time	Notes
1	Filippo Mondelli; Andrea Panizza; Luca Rambaldi; Giacomo Gentili	Italy	5:33.22	FA
2	Dominik Czaja; Wiktor Chabel; Szymon Pośnik; Fabian Barański	Poland	5:34.08	FA
3	Hamish Playfair; Campbell Watts; Cameron Girdlestone; David Watts	Australia	5:36.61	FA
4	Jonathan Walton; Angus Groom; Jack Beaumont; Peter Lambert	Great Britain	5:39.86	FB
5	Dmytro Mikhay; Serhiy Hryn; Oleksandr Nadtoka; Ivan Dovhodko	Ukraine	5:42.97	FB
6	Kaur Kuslap; Allar Raja; Tõnu Endrekson; Kaspar Taimsoo	Estonia	5:43.68	FB

==== Semifinal 2 ====
Rank	Rowers	Country	Time	Notes
1	Dirk Uittenbogaard; Abe Wiersma; Tone Wieten; Koen Metsemakers	Netherlands	5:33.59	FA
2	Karl Schulze; Timo Piontek; Max Appel; Hans Gruhne	Germany	5:36.61	FA
3	Yi Xudi; Zang Ha; Liu Dang; Zhang Quan	China	5:37.96	FA
4	Erik Solbakken; Martin Helseth; Jan Helvig; Olaf Tufte	Norway	5:38.27	FB
5	Nathan Flannery; Lewis Hollows; Cameron Crampton; Jordan Parry	New Zealand	5:42.79	FB
6	Ilya Kondratyev; Artyom Kosov; Nikolay Pimenov; Pavel Sorin	Russia	5:43.29	FB

=== Finals ===
The A final determined the rankings for places 1 to 6. Additional rankings were determined in the other finals.

==== Final C ====
Rank	Rowers	Country	Time
1	John Graves; Gregory Ansolabehere; Tristan Amberger; Michael Knippen	United States	5:48.61
2	Thomas Lehner; Armin Auerbach; Julian Brabec; Joerg Auerbach	Austria	5:52.95
3	Žygimantas Gališanskis; Rolandas Maščinskas; Dominykas Jančionis; Aurimas Adomavičius	Lithuania	5:56.99
4	Thibaud Turlan; Guillaume Turlan; Stanislas Desgrippes; Maxime Ducret	France	5:58.64
5	Alexandru Maşnic; Ivan Corșunov; Chirill Visotchi-Sestacov; Alexandr Bulat	Moldova	6:01.85

==== Final B ====
Rank	Rowers	Country	Time
1	Erik Solbakken; Martin Helseth; Jan Helvig; Olaf Tufte	Norway	5:58.13
2	Jonathan Walton; Angus Groom; Jack Beaumont; Peter Lambert	Great Britain	5:58.65
3	Nathan Flannery; Lewis Hollows; Cameron Crampton; Jordan Parry	New Zealand	6:01.59
4	Dmytro Mikhay; Serhiy Hryn; Oleksandr Nadtoka; Ivan Dovhodko	Ukraine	6:02.15
5	Ilya Kondratyev; Artyom Kosov; Nikolay Pimenov; Pavel Sorin	Russia	6:06.15
6	Kaur Kuslap; Allar Raja; Tõnu Endrekson; Kaspar Taimsoo	Estonia	6:09.63

==== Final A ====
Rank	Rowers	Country	Time
1st place, gold medalist(s)	Dirk Uittenbogaard; Abe Wiersma; Tone Wieten; Koen Metsemakers	Netherlands	5:51.75
2nd place, silver medalist(s)	Dominik Czaja; Wiktor Chabel; Szymon Pośnik; Fabian Barański	Poland	5:55.59
3rd place, bronze medalist(s)	Filippo Mondelli; Andrea Panizza; Luca Rambaldi; Giacomo Gentili	Italy	5:56.11
4	Hamish Playfair; Campbell Watts; Cameron Girdlestone; David Watts	Australia	6:01.03
5	Karl Schulze; Timo Piontek; Max Appel; Hans Gruhne	Germany	6:04.31
6	Yi Xudi; Zang Ha; Liu Dang; Zhang Quan	China	6:19.05
