= 2018 World Rowing Championships – Men's quadruple sculls =

Men's quadruple sculls at the 2018 World Rowing Championships
- Venue: Plovdiv Regatta Venue
- Location: Plovdiv, Bulgaria
- Dates: 9–15 September
- Competitors: 48 from 12 nations
- Winning time: 5:35.31

Medalists
gold medal	Filippo Mondelli; Andrea Panizza; Luca Rambaldi; Giacomo Gentili	Italy
silver medal	Caleb Antill; Campbell Watts; Alexander Purnell; David Watts	Australia
bronze medal	Dmytro Mikhay; Serhiy Hryn; Oleksandr Nadtoka; Ivan Dovhodko	Ukraine

The men's quadruple sculls competition at the 2018 World Rowing Championships in Plovdiv took place at the Plovdiv Regatta Venue.

== Schedule ==
The schedule was as follows:

Date	Time	Round
Sunday 9 September 2018	17:15	Heats
Thursday 13 September 2018	13:06	Repechages
Saturday 15 September 2018	10:34	Final B
Saturday 15 September 2018	13:16	Final A

All times are Eastern European Summer Time (UTC+3)

== Results ==
=== Heats ===
Heat winners advanced directly to the A final. The remaining boats were sent to the repechages.

==== Heat 1 ====
Rank	Rowers	Country	Time	Notes
1	Dmytro Mikhay; Serhiy Hryn; Oleksandr Nadtoka; Ivan Dovhodko	Ukraine	5:38.31	FA
2	Dirk Uittenbogaard; Stefan Broenink; Koen Metsemakers; Abe Wiersma	Netherlands	5:38.97	R
3	Caleb Antill; Campbell Watts; Alexander Purnell; David Watts	Australia	5:40.53	R
4	Graeme Thomas; Jonathan Walton; John Collins; Tom Barras	Great Britain	5:42.90	R
5	Nathan Flannery; Mahé Drysdale; Cameron Crampton; Lewis Hollows	New Zealand	5:44.79	R
6	Filippo Mondelli; Andrea Panizza; Luca Rambaldi; Giacomo Gentili	Italy	5:54.30	R

==== Heat 2 ====
Rank	Rowers	Country	Time	Notes
1	Szymon Pośnik; Maciej Zawojski; Dominik Czaja; Wiktor Chabel	Poland	5:39.13	FA
2	Dovydas Nemeravičius; Saulius Ritter; Rolandas Maščinskas; Aurimas Adomavičius	Lithuania	5:42.58	R
3	Ruben Steinhardt; Philipp Syring; Hans Gruhne; Stephan Krüger	Germany	5:44.75	R
4	Mickaël Marteau; Thibaut Verhoeven; Albéric Cormerais; Maxime Ducret	France	5:47.50	R
5	Artyom Kosov; Viacheslav Mikhaylevskiy; Nikolay Pimenov; Pavel Sorin	Russia	5:48.83	R
6	Erik Frid; Michael Knippen; Gregory Ansolabehere; Justin Keen	United States	5:51.18	R

=== Repechages ===
The two fastest boats in each repechage advanced to the A final. The remaining boats were sent to the B final.

==== Repechage 1 ====
Rank	Rowers	Country	Time	Notes
1	Dirk Uittenbogaard; Stefan Broenink; Koen Metsemakers; Abe Wiersma	Netherlands	5:40.87	FA
2	Filippo Mondelli; Andrea Panizza; Luca Rambaldi; Giacomo Gentili	Italy	5:42.70	FA
3	Graeme Thomas; Jonathan Walton; John Collins; Tom Barras	Great Britain	5:45.55	FB
4	Ruben Steinhardt; Philipp Syring; Hans Gruhne; Stephan Krüger	Germany	5:48.13	FB
5	Artyom Kosov; Viacheslav Mikhaylevskiy; Nikolay Pimenov; Pavel Sorin	Russia	6:00.83	FB

==== Repechage 2 ====
Rank	Rowers	Country	Time	Notes
1	Caleb Antill; Campbell Watts; Alexander Purnell; David Watts	Australia	5:42.81	FA
2	Nathan Flannery; Mahé Drysdale; Cameron Crampton; Lewis Hollows	New Zealand	5:43.21	FA
3	Dovydas Nemeravičius; Saulius Ritter; Rolandas Maščinskas; Aurimas Adomavičius	Lithuania	5:43.70	FB
4	Mickaël Marteau; Thibaut Verhoeven; Albéric Cormerais; Maxime Ducret	France	5:53.51	FB
5	Erik Frid; Michael Knippen; Gregory Ansolabehere; Justin Keen	United States	5:55.03	FB

=== Finals ===
The A final determined the rankings for places 1 to 6. Additional rankings were determined in the B final.

==== Final B ====
Rank	Rowers	Country	Time
1	Graeme Thomas; Jonathan Walton; John Collins; Tom Barras	Great Britain	5:39.88
2	Ruben Steinhardt; Philipp Syring; Hans Gruhne; Stephan Krüger	Germany	5:40.69
3	Mickaël Marteau; Thibaut Verhoeven; Albéric Cormerais; Maxime Ducret	France	5:44.00
4	Artyom Kosov; Viacheslav Mikhaylevskiy; Nikolay Pimenov; Pavel Sorin	Russia	5:46.84
5	Erik Frid; Michael Knippen; Gregory Ansolabehere; Justin Keen	United States	5:47.85
6	Dovydas Nemeravičius; Saulius Ritter; Rolandas Maščinskas; Aurimas Adomavičius	Lithuania	5:52.51

==== Final A ====
Rank	Rowers	Country	Time
1st place, gold medalist(s)	Filippo Mondelli; Andrea Panizza; Luca Rambaldi; Giacomo Gentili	Italy	5:35.31
2nd place, silver medalist(s)	Caleb Antill; Campbell Watts; Alexander Purnell; David Watts	Australia	5:36.51
3rd place, bronze medalist(s)	Dmytro Mikhay; Serhiy Hryn; Oleksandr Nadtoka; Ivan Dovhodko	Ukraine	5:37.28
4	Nathan Flannery; Mahé Drysdale; Cameron Crampton; Lewis Hollows	New Zealand	5:37.39
5	Dirk Uittenbogaard; Stefan Broenink; Koen Metsemakers; Abe Wiersma	Netherlands	5:37.91
6	Szymon Pośnik; Maciej Zawojski; Dominik Czaja; Wiktor Chabel	Poland	5:39.43
