= Rowing at the 2016 Summer Olympics – Men's quadruple sculls =

Men's quadruple sculls at the Games of the XXXI Olympiad
- Venue: Rodrigo de Freitas Lagoon
- Date: 6–11 August 2016
- Competitors: 40 from 10 nations
- Teams: 10
- Winning time: 6:06.81

Medalists
1st place, gold medalist(s)		Philipp Wende; Lauritz Schoof; Karl Schulze; Hans Gruhne	Germany
2nd place, silver medalist(s)		Karsten Forsterling; Alexander Belonogoff; Cameron Girdlestone; James McRae	Australia
3rd place, bronze medalist(s)		Andrei Jämsä; Allar Raja; Tõnu Endrekson; Kaspar Taimsoo	Estonia

The men's quadruple sculls competition at the 2016 Summer Olympics in Rio de Janeiro was held from 6 to 11 August at the Lagoon Rodrigo de Freitas.

The medals for the competition were presented by James Tomkins, Australia, member of the International Olympic Committee, and the gifts were presented by Patrick Rombaut, Belgium, Member of the Executive Committee of the International Rowing Federation.

== Results ==
=== Heats ===
First two of each heat qualify to Final A, remainder goes to the repechage.

==== Heat 1 ====
Rank	Rower	Country	Time	Notes
1	Andrei Jämsä; Allar Raja; Tõnu Endrekson; Kaspar Taimsoo	Estonia	5:51.710	FA
2	Dmytro Mikhay; Artem Morozov; Oleksandr Nadtoka; Ivan Dovhodko	Ukraine	5:52.900	FA
3	Philipp Wende; Lauritz Schoof; Karl Schulze; Hans Gruhne	Germany	5:53.630	R
4	Nathan Flannery; John Storey; George Bridgewater; Jade Uru	New Zealand	5:59.130	R
5	Julien Bahain; Robert Gibson; Will Dean; Pascal Lussier	Canada	6:34.550	R

==== Heat 2 ====
Rank	Rower	Country	Time	Notes
1	Karsten Forsterling; Alexander Belonogoff; Cameron Girdlestone; James McRae	Australia	5:50.980	FA
2	Mateusz Biskup; Wiktor Chabel; Dariusz Radosz; Mirosław Ziętarski	Poland	5:51.280	FA
3	Nico Stahlberg; Augustin Maillefer; Roman Röösli; Barnabé Delarze	Switzerland	5:51.520	R
4	Jack Beaumont; Sam Townsend; Angus Groom; Peter Lambert	Great Britain	5:52.770	R
5	Dovydas Nemeravičius; Martynas Džiaugys; Dominykas Jančionis; Aurimas Adomavičius	Lithuania	5:58.700	R

=== Repechage ===
First two of heat qualify to Final A, remainder goes to the Final B.

Rank	Rower	Country	Time	Notes
1	Philipp Wende; Lauritz Schoof; Karl Schulze; Hans Gruhne	Germany	5:51.43	FA
2	Jack Beaumont; Sam Townsend; Angus Groom; Peter Lambert	Great Britain	5:53.10	FA
3	Dovydas Nemeravičius; Martynas Džiaugys; Dominykas Jančionis; Aurimas Adomavičius	Lithuania	5:55.78	FB
4	Nico Stahlberg; Augustin Maillefer; Roman Röösli; Barnabé Delarze	Switzerland	5:56.13	FB
5	Julien Bahain; Robert Gibson; Will Dean; Pascal Lussier	Canada	5:56.28	FB
6	Nathan Flannery; John Storey; George Bridgewater; Jade Uru	New Zealand	5:58.92	FB

=== Finals ===
==== Final B ====
Rank	Rower	Country	Time	Notes
1	Nico Stahlberg; Augustin Maillefer; Roman Röösli; Barnabé Delarze	Switzerland	6:11.18	
2	Julien Bahain; Robert Gibson; Will Dean; Pascal Lussier	Canada	6:13.55	
3	Dovydas Nemeravičius; Martynas Džiaugys; Dominykas Jančionis; Aurimas Adomavičius	Lithuania	6:15.16	
4	Nathan Flannery; John Storey; George Bridgewater; Jade Uru	New Zealand	6:18.92	

==== Final A ====
Rank	Rower	Country	Time	Notes
1st place, gold medalist(s)	Philipp Wende; Lauritz Schoof; Karl Schulze; Hans Gruhne	Germany	6:06.81	Lane 1
2nd place, silver medalist(s)	Karsten Forsterling; Alexander Belonogoff; Cameron Girdlestone; James McRae	Australia	6:07.96	Lane 3
3rd place, bronze medalist(s)	Andrei Jämsä; Allar Raja; Tõnu Endrekson; Kaspar Taimsoo	Estonia	6:10.65	Lane 4
4	Mateusz Biskup; Wiktor Chabel; Dariusz Radosz; Mirosław Ziętarski	Poland	6:12.09	Lane 2
5	Jack Beaumont; Sam Townsend; Angus Groom; Peter Lambert	Great Britain	6:13.08	Lane 6
6	Dmytro Mikhay; Artem Morozov; Oleksandr Nadtoka; Ivan Dovhodko	Ukraine	6:16.30	Lane 5
