= Rowing at the 2020 Summer Olympics – Men's quadruple sculls =

Men's quadruple sculls at the Games of the XXXII Olympiad
- Olympic rowing
- Venue: Sea Forest Waterway
- Dates: 23–28 July 2021
- Competitors: 40 from 10 nations
- Winning time: 5:32.03

Medalists
| 1st place, gold medalist(s) | | Dirk Uittenbogaard; Abe Wiersma; Tone Wieten; Koen Metsemakers | Netherlands |
| 2nd place, silver medalist(s) | | Harry Leask; Angus Groom; Tom Barras; Jack Beaumont | Great Britain |
| 3rd place, bronze medalist(s) | | Jack Cleary; Caleb Antill; Cameron Girdlestone; Luke Letcher | Australia |

The men's quadruple sculls event at the 2020 Summer Olympics took place from 23 to 28 July 2021 at the Sea Forest Waterway. 40 rowers from 10 nations competed.

== Background ==
This was the 12th appearance of the event, which has been held every year since 1976.

The reigning medalists in the event were Germany, Australia, and Estonia. All three qualified a boat for the event.

== Qualification ==
Each National Olympic Committee (NOC) has been limited to a single boat in the event since 1912. There were 10 qualifying places in the men's quadruple sculls:

- 8 from the 2019 World Championship
- 2 from the final qualification regatta

== Competition format ==
This rowing event is a quadruple scull event, meaning that each boat is propelled by four rowers. The "scull" portion means that the rower uses two oars, one on each side of the boat; this contrasts with sweep rowing in which each rower has one oar and rows on only one side. The competition consists of two rounds. Finals are held to determine the placing of each boat. The course used the 2000 metres distance that became the Olympic standard in 1912.

During the first round two heats were held. The first two boats in each heat advanced to final A, while all others were relegated to the repechages.

The repechage offered rowers a second chance to qualify for Final A. The top two boats in the repechage moved on to Final A, with the remaining boats sent to Final B.

There are two finals. Final A determined the medalists and the places through 6th. Final B determined places seven through ten.

== Schedule ==
The competition was held over five days.

All times are Japan Standard Time (UTC+9)

| Date | Time | Round |
|---|---|---|
| Friday, 23 July 2021 | 11:30 | Heats |
| Sunday, 25 July 2021 | 10:40 | Repechage |
| Wednesday, 28 July 2021 | 8:50 | Final B |
| Wednesday, 28 July 2021 | 10:30 | Final A |

== Results ==
=== Heats ===
The first two of each heat qualified for the final, while the remainder went to the repechage.

==== Heat 1 ====
| Rank | Lane | Rower | Nation | Time | Notes |
|---|---|---|---|---|---|
| 1 | 5 | Dirk Uittenbogaard; Abe Wiersma; Tone Wieten; Koen Metsemakers | Netherlands | 5:39.80 | Q |
| 2 | 4 | Jack Cleary; Caleb Antill; Cameron Girdlestone; Luke Letcher | Australia | 5:41.54 | Q |
| 3 | 2 | Harry Leask; Angus Groom; Tom Barras; Jack Beaumont | Great Britain | 5:42.01 | R |
| 4 | 1 | Yi Xudi; Zang Ha; Liu Dang; Zhang Quan | China | 5:43.44 | R |
| 5 | 3 | Armandas Kelmelis; Martynas Dziaugys; Dovydas Nemeravicius; Dominykas Jancionis | Lithuania | 6:03.07 | R |

==== Heat 2 ====
| Rank | Lane | Rower | Nation | Time | Notes |
|---|---|---|---|---|---|
| 1 | 2 | Dominik Czaja; Wiktor Chabel; Szymon Posnik; Fabian Baranski | Poland | 5:39.25 | Q |
| 2 | 3 | Simone Venier; Andrea Panizza; Luca Rambaldi; Giacomo Gentili | Italy | 5:39.28 | Q |
| 3 | 1 | Juri-Mikk Udam; Allar Raja; Tonu Endrekson; Kaspar Taimsoo | Estonia | 5:47.12 | R |
| 4 | 4 | Martin Helseth; Olaf Karl Tufte; Jan Oscar Stabe Helvig; Erik Andre Solbakken | Norway | 5:49.02 | R |
| 5 | 5 | Tim Ole Naske; Karl Schulze; Hans Gruhne; Max Appel | Germany | 5:50.11 | R |

=== Repechage ===
The first two in the repechage qualified for the final, while the remainder went to the B final (out of medal contention).

| Rank | Lane | Rower | Nation | Time | Notes |
|---|---|---|---|---|---|
| 1 | 3 | Harry Leask; Angus Groom; Tom Barras; Jack Beaumont | Great Britain | 5:55.91 | FA |
| 2 | 4 | Juri-Mikk Udam; Allar Raja; Tonu Endrekson; Kaspar Taimsoo | Estonia | 5:56.52 | FA |
| 3 | 2 | Yi Xudi; Zang Ha; Liu Dang; Zhang Quan | China | 5:56.86 | FB |
| 4 | 5 | Martin Helseth; Olaf Karl Tufte; Jan Oscar Stabe Helvig; Erik Andre Solbakken | Norway | 6:02.85 | FB |
| 5 | 1 | Tim Ole Naske; Karl Schulze; Hans Gruhne; Max Appel | Germany | 6:02.86 | FB |
| 6 | 6 | Armandas Kelmelis; Martynas Dziaugys; Dovydas Nemeravicius; Dominykas Jancionis | Lithuania | 6:14.73 | FB |

=== Finals ===
==== Final B ====
| Rank | Lane | Rower | Nation | Time | Notes |
|---|---|---|---|---|---|
| 7 | 3 | Yi Xudi; Zang Ha; Liu Dang; Zhang Quan | China | 5:46.07 | |
| 8 | 4 | Tim Ole Naske; Karl Schulze; Hans Gruhne; Max Appel | Germany | 5:46.78 | |
| 9 | 2 | Martin Helseth; Olaf Karl Tufte; Jan Oscar Stabe Helvig; Erik Andre Solbakken | Norway | 5:47.34 | |
| 10 | 1 | Armandas Kelmelis; Martynas Dziaugys; Dovydas Nemeravicius; Dominykas Jancionis | Lithuania | 5:51.64 | |

==== Final A ====
| Rank | Lane | Rower | Nation | Time | Notes |
|---|---|---|---|---|---|
| 1st place, gold medalist(s) | 4 | Dirk Uittenbogaard; Abe Wiersma; Tone Wieten; Koen Metsemakers | Netherlands | 5:32.03 | OB, WB |
| 2nd place, silver medalist(s) | 1 | Harry Leask; Angus Groom; Tom Barras; Jack Beaumont | Great Britain | 5:33.75 | |
| 3rd place, bronze medalist(s) | 5 | Jack Cleary; Caleb Antill; Cameron Girdlestone; Luke Letcher | Australia | 5:33.97 | |
| 4 | 3 | Dominik Czaja; Wiktor Chabel; Szymon Posnik; Fabian Baranski | Poland | 5:34.27 | |
| 5 | 2 | Simone Venier; Andrea Panizza; Luca Rambaldi; Giacomo Gentili | Italy | 5:37.29 | |
| 6 | 6 | Juri-Mikk Udam; Allar Raja; Tonu Endrekson; Kaspar Taimsoo | Estonia | 5:38.58 | |
