= Armandas Kelmelis =

Lithuanian rower (born 1998)

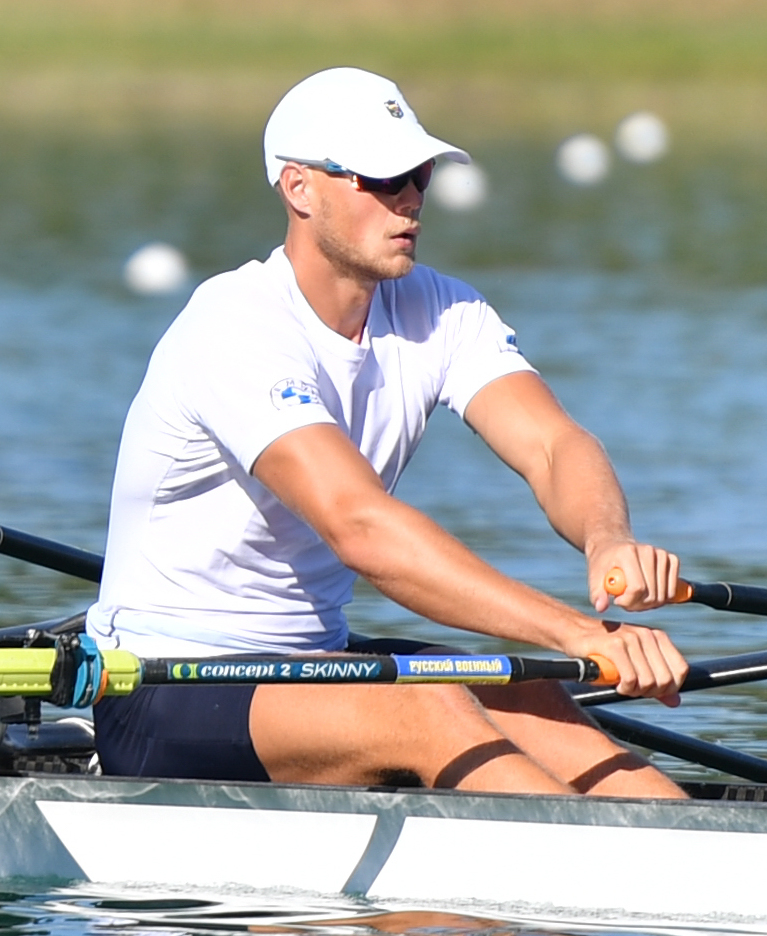
- Kelmelis at the 2022 European Championships

Personal information
- Born: 22 March 1998 (age 28) Kaunas, Lithuania
- Height: 193 cm (6 ft 4 in)
- Weight: 86 kg (190 lb)
Medal record
Men's rowing
Representing Lithuania
European Championships
Bronze medal – third place	2022 Munich	Double sculls
World Junior Championships
Gold medal – first place	2016 Rotterdam	JM1x
Silver medal – second place	2014 Hamburg	JM2x
European Junior Championships
Gold medal – first place	2016 Trakai	JM1x
Silver medal – second place	2015 Racise	JM1x
Bronze medal – third place	2014 Hacevinkel	JM2x

Armandas Kelmelis (born 22 March 1998) is a Lithuanian rower.

In 2016 less than a month before 2016 Summer Olympics started, he was selected to Olympic team due withdrawal of injured Rolandas Maščinskas. Kelmelis finished 19th in the men's single sculls event.

He also competed for Lithuania at the 2020 Summer Olympics, finishing 10th in the men's quadruple sculls event, with Martynas Džiaugys, Dovydas Nemeravičius and Dominykas Jančionis.

Kelmelis won a bronze medal at the 2022 European Rowing Championships in the men's double sculls event with Dovydas Nemeravičius.
