= Abe Wiersma =

Dutch rower

Personal information
- Nationality: Dutch
- Born: 14 August 1994 (age 31) Amsterdam, Netherlands
- Height: 1.93 m (6 ft 4 in)
- Weight: 92 kg (203 lb)

Sport
- Country: Netherlands
- Sport: Rowing
- Event: Quadruple sculls
- Club: Willem III RV
Medal record
Men's rowing
Representing the Netherlands
Olympic Games
Gold medal – first place	2020 Tokyo	Quadruple sculls
World Championships
Gold medal – first place	2019 Ottensheim	Quadruple sculls
Silver medal – second place	2022 Račice	Eight
European Championships
Gold medal – first place	2019 Lucerne	Quadruple sculls
Gold medal – first place	2020 Poznań	Quadruple sculls
Silver medal – second place	2021 Varese	Quadruple sculls
Silver medal – second place	2022 Munich	Eight

Abe Wiersma (born 14 August 1994 in Amsterdam) is a Dutch representative rower, an Olympian and an Olympic and world champion. He won his world championship in the men's quad scull at the 2019 World Rowing Championships. In the Dutch men's quad scull at Tokyo 2020 he won an Olympic gold medal and set a new world's best time for that event.

== International representative rowing ==
Wiersma's Dutch representative debut came in 2011 when he was selected in a quad scull to race at the Junior World Rowing Championships at Eton Dorney. The following year, he also raced for The Netherlands in the quad at the 2012 World Junior Championships. From 2014 to 2016, Wiersma rowed for The Netherlands at World Rowing U23 Championships firstly in the quad and then in the double scull winning bronze medals in both 2015 and 2016.

In 2017, Wiersma and Koen Metsemakers secured seats in the Dutch senior men's quad scull and they raced in that boat at all three World Rowing Cups, the European Championships and the 2017 World Rowing Championships in Sarasota, Florida where they finished in overall fourth place. Wiersma held his seat in 2018 again competing at three World Rowing Cups, the 2018 European Championships and the 2018 World Rowing Championships in Plovdiv.

In 2019 with Metsemakers at stroke and Stefan Broenink changed out for Tone Wieten, the Dutch quad continued to improve their rankings, winning gold at the European Championships, taking third place at the World Rowing Cup III and then at the 2019 World Rowing Championships in Linz-Ottensheim taking the gold medal ahead of Poland, winning Wiersma and the crew a World Championship title. The crew stayed together with limited international racing in 2020 when they again won the European Championships.

They commenced their 2021 campaign for the delayed Tokyo Olympics with a second placing at the 2021 European Championships and a gold medal at the World Rowing Cup II in May 2021.
