= Serhiy Hryn =

Serhiy Hryn may refer to:

- Serhiy Hryn (footballer) (born 1994), Ukrainian footballer
- Serhiy Hryn (rower) (born 1981), Ukrainian rower
