= Dmytro Mikhay =

Ukrainian rower

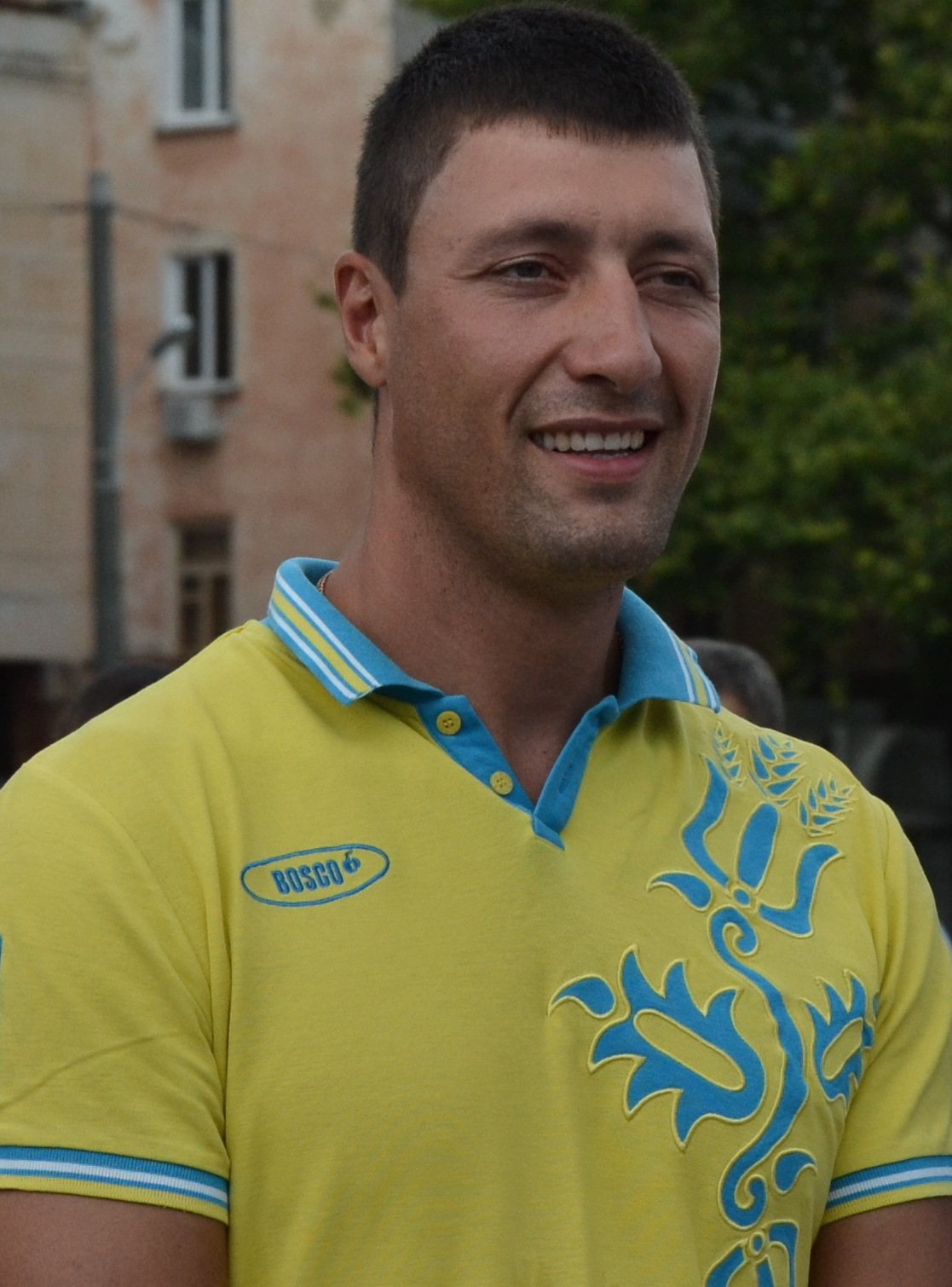

Personal information
- Nationality: Ukrainian
- Born: 27 February 1990 (age 36) Kherson, Ukrainian SSR, Soviet Union
- Height: 1.95 m (6 ft 5 in)
- Weight: 94 kg (207 lb)

Sport
- Country: Ukraine
- Sport: Rowing
Medal record
Men's rowing
Representing Ukraine
World Championships
Gold medal – first place	2014 Amsterdam	Quadruple sculls
Bronze medal – third place	2018 Plovdiv	Quadruple sculls
European Championships
Gold medal – first place	2014 Belgrade	Quadruple sculls
Silver medal – second place	2015 Poznań	Quadruple sculls
Universiade
Silver medal – second place	2013 Kazan	Eight
Silver medal – second place	2015 Gwangju	Eight

Dmytro Valeriyovych Mikhay (Ukrainian: Дмитро Валерійович Міхай; born 27 February 1990) is a Ukrainian rower. He won the gold medal in the quadruple sculls at the 2014 World Rowing Championships in Amsterdam, with what is still a world's fastest time as of September 2018.

He competed in the double sculls at the 2012 Summer Olympics with Artem Morozov. He won the gold medal in the quadruple sculls at the 2014 World Rowing Championships in Amsterdam with Morozov, Oleksandr Nadtoka and Ivan Dovhodko. The team also won the European Championships that year. The team of Mikhay, Morozov, Nadtoka and Dovhodko won the silver medal at the 2015 European Championships.

He competed at the 2016 Olympic Games in the men's quadruple sculls with Morozov, Oleksandr Nadtoka and Ivan Dovhodko. In 2018, Mikhay, alongside Sergii Gryn, Nadtoka and Dovhodko won the bronze medal in the men's quadruple sculls at the World Championships.

Following the 2022 Russian invasion of Ukraine, Mikhay and his wife Dasha escaped to England, where they are living with the family of his friend, former rower Jack Beaumont, in Nettlebed, near Henley-on-Thames in Oxfordshire.
