= Augustin Maillefer =

Swiss rower

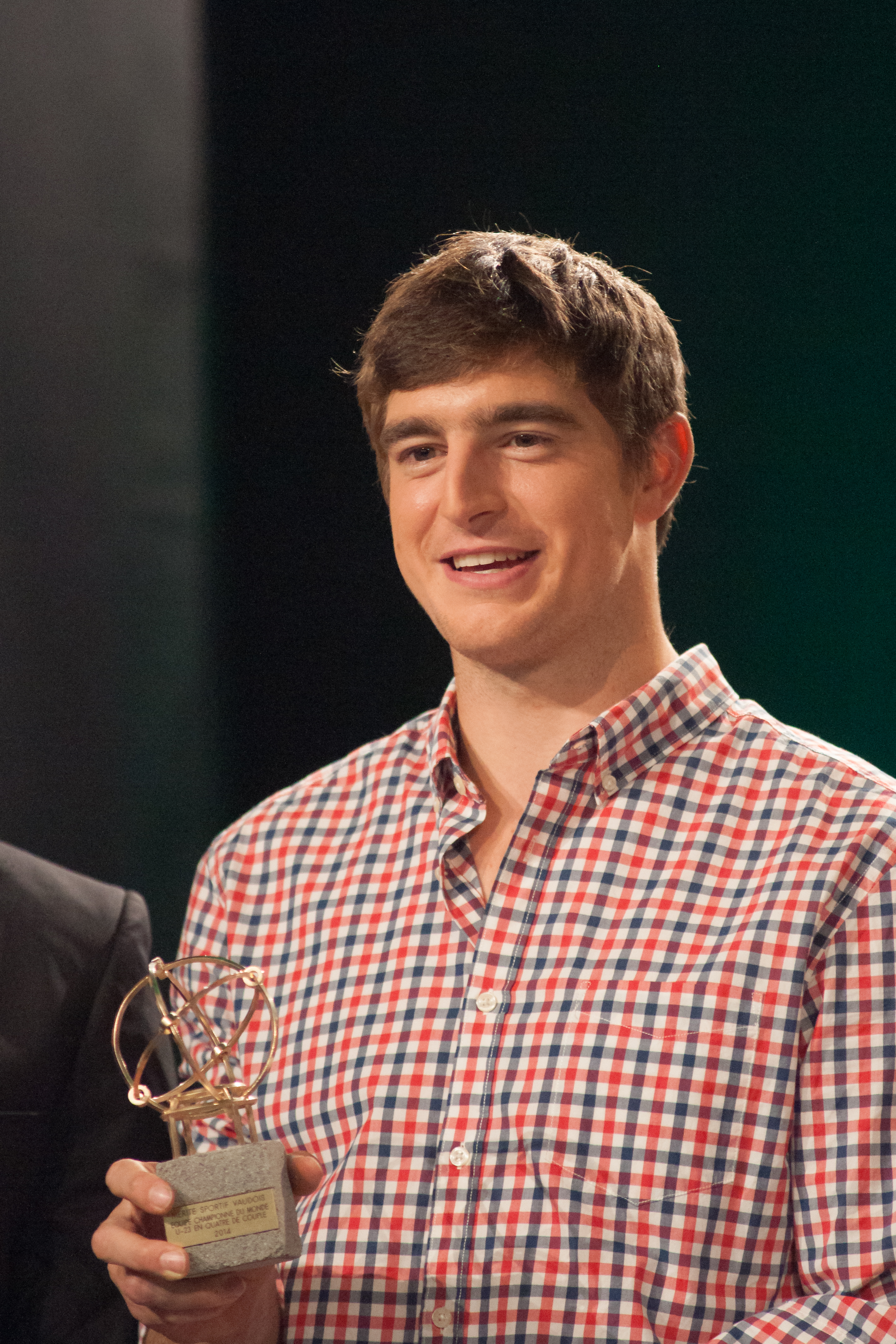
- Maillefer in 2014

Personal information
- Born: 29 April 1993 (age 33)

Sport
- Sport: Rowing

Augustin Maillefer (born 29 April 1993) is a Swiss rower. He competed in the men's quadruple sculls event at the 2016 Summer Olympics.
