= Angus Groom =

British rower

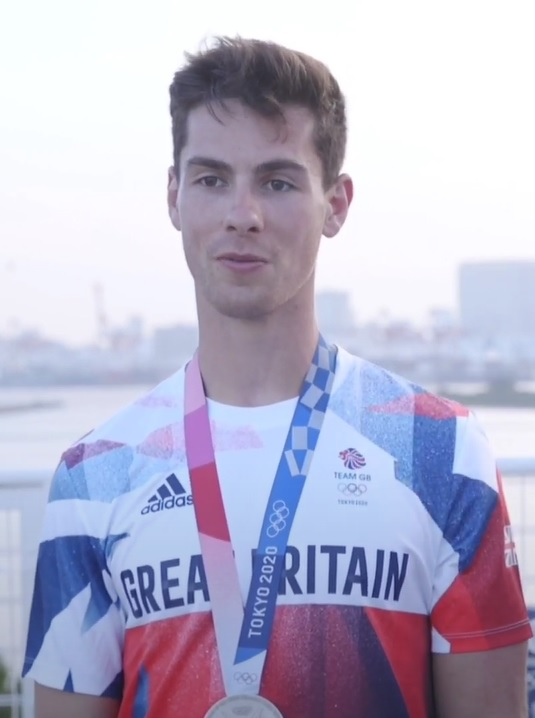
- Groom after the 2020 Summer Olympics

Personal information
- Born: 16 June 1992 (age 34) Glasgow, Scotland
- Height: 195 cm (6 ft 5 in)
- Weight: 94 kg (207 lb)

Sport
- Country: Great Britain
- Sport: Rowing
- Club: Leander Club
Medal record
Men's rowing
Representing Great Britain
Olympic Games
| Silver medal – second place | 2020 Tokyo | Quadruple sculls |
European Championships
| Bronze medal – third place | 2019 Lucerne | Quadruple sculls |

Angus Groom (born 16 June 1992) is a British rower. He is a silver medallist at the 2020 Summer Olympics. He has also won two World Cup gold medals, two World Cup silver medals, a World Cup bronze and European championship bronze.

== Career ==
Groom learnt to row in 2005 at Walton Rowing Club, and first represented Britain at the GB-France Match in 2008 before going on to row at the World Rowing Junior Championships. From 2010 to 2013 he read for a degree in Natural Sciences at Durham University as a member of Hatfield College. In 2013, he was named as Team Durham’s Sportsman of the Year after winning all three BUCS Championship sculling events and helping Durham claim the Victor Ludorum for a tenth successive year. He was a member of the Scotland Team at the 2014 Commonwealth Rowing Championships.

He competed in the men's quadruple sculls event at the 2016 Summer Olympics.

At the 2020 Summer Olympics held in 2021 in Tokyo, Groom won a silver together with Harry Leask, Tom Barras and Jack Beaumont in the Men's quadruple sculls. Groom announced his retirement from international rowing after the Games to start a career as research scientist in medical science after studying at the University of Oxford.

Following the Olympics, Groom rowed for the Oxford University Boat Club in 2022. It was in this year that Oxford ended Cambridge's run of wins in The Boat Race, claiming victory by two and a quarter lengths.
