= Dariusz Radosz =

Polish rower (born 1986)

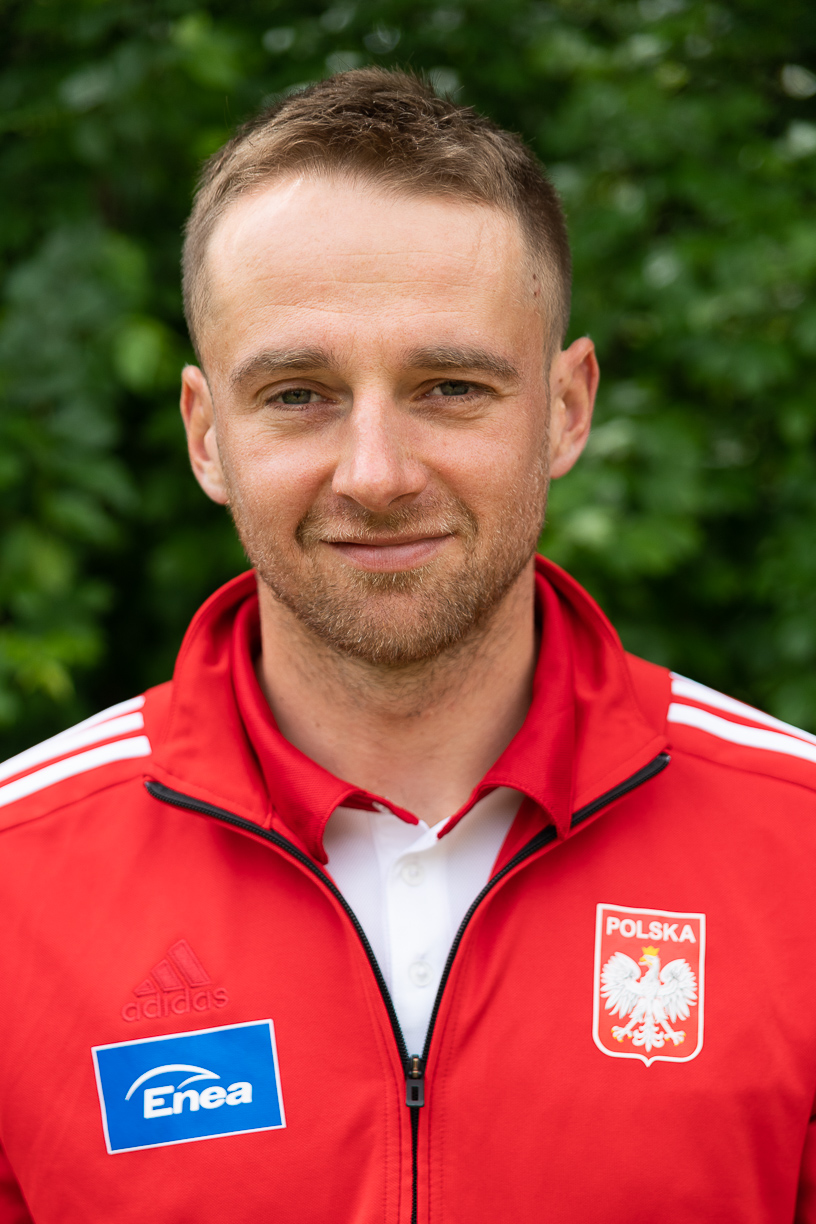

Personal information
- Born: 13 August 1986 (age 39) Toruń, Poland

Sport
- Sport: Rowing
Medal record
Men's rowing
Representing Poland
European Championships
Silver medal – second place	2017 Račice	M4x

Dariusz Radosz (born 13 August 1986) is a Polish rower. He competed in the men's quadruple sculls event at the 2016 Summer Olympics.
