= Australian National University Boat Club =

The Australian National University Boat Club
- Location: Sullivans Creek, Canberra, Australia
- Home water: Lake Burley Griffin, Canberra
- Founded: 18 April 1964
- Affiliations: Rowing ACT
- Website: http://www.anuboatclub.org/

Events
- Disher Challenge Cup

The Australian National University Boat Club is the rowing club of Australian National University and is based in Canberra, Australia, on the lower reaches of Sullivan's Creek, two hundred metres from the Lake Burley Griffin. Founded in 1964, the ANU Boat Club is Canberra's oldest rowing club. The present club boathouse has been located on the banks of Sullivan's creek since 1971.

== History ==
The Australian National University Rowing Club was established in 1964 and is the oldest continuing rowing club in the Australian Capital Territory.

== The Boat House ==
The present day boathouse was constructed in 1971 for the university's Sports Union, replacing a temporary corrugated iron shed used to house the racing shells of the ANU Boat Club. It was opened by Mr Moshe Erell, Israeli Ambassador to Australia who was also made an honorary member. The design included room for thirty boat racks, a maintenance workshop, showers and toilets, and space was made available for future expansions. More recent modifications include the installation of a roof safety system and additions of higher density racks and storage to accommodate Australian National University Mountaineering Club equipment.

After the significant drop in river height following repair work to the Scrivener Dam a temporary floating pontoon was installed and has remained as a launching site for boats onto the river.

In 2019 it was announced that the Boat Club would be moving to a new location on the other side of Sullivan's Creek as part of the University's SA8 building program.

== Members ==
=== World champions ===
- Caleb Antill 2016 U23 World Champion and 2017 silver medallist - M4X
