= Dirk Uittenbogaard =

Dutch rower (born 1990)

Personal information
- Full name: Lucas Theodoor Dirk Uittenbogaard
- Nationality: Dutch
- Born: 8 May 1990 (age 36) Amsterdam, Netherlands
- Height: 1. 98 m
- Weight: 90 kg (198 lb)

Sport
- Country: Netherlands
- Sport: Rowing
- Events: Quadruple sculls, Eight
Medal record
Men's rowing
Representing the Netherlands
Olympic Games
Gold medal – first place	2020 Tokyo	Quadruple sculls
Bronze medal – third place	2016 Rio de Janeiro	Eight
World Championships
Gold medal – first place	2019 Ottensheim	Quadruple sculls
Bronze medal – third place	2015 Aiguebelette	Eight
European Championships
Gold medal – first place	2019 Lucerne	Quadruple sculls
Gold medal – first place	2019 Lucerne	Quadruple sculls
Silver medal – second place	2021 Varese	Quadruple sculls

Lucas Theodoor Dirk Uittenbogaard (born 8 May 1990) is a Dutch representative rower. He is a European champion, an Olympic gold and bronze medallist and is the reigning world champion in the men's quad scull won at the 2019 World Rowing Championships. He won a bronze medal in the eight at the 2015 World Rowing Championships and competed in the men's eight event at the 2016 Summer Olympics in Rio de Janeiro, winning a bronze medal. In the Dutch men's quad scull at Tokyo 2020 he won an Olympic gold medal and set a new world's best time for that event.

== International representative rowing ==
Uittenbogaard's representative debut for The Netherlands came in 2006 when he was selected in a double scull to race at the Junior World Rowing Championships in Beijing. The following year, he also raced for The Netherlands in the quad at the 2008 World Junior Championships. From 2009 to 2012, Uittenbogaard rowed for The Netherlands at World Rowing U23 Championships firstly in the quad, then as a single sculler, then moving into the double scull for 2011–12.

2013 saw Uittenbogaard selected in Dutch senior representative crews. He rowed in the men's quad at the 2013 World Rowing Championships in South Korea, then in a double scull during 2014 including the 2014 World Rowing Championships. He earned a seat in the Dutch senior men's eight for the 2015 World Rowing Cup III and then raced in the eight at the 2015 World Rowing Championships (third place), and the 2016 Olympic Games (third place). In 2017, he rowed in a Dutch men's pair at two World Rowing Cups.

In 2018, Uittenbogaard secured a seat in The Netherlands' quad-scull and raced in that boat at all three World Rowing Cups, the 2018 European Championships and the 2018 World Rowing Championships in Plovdiv. In 2019, with Metsemakers at stroke and Stefan Broenink changed out for Tone Wieten the Dutch quad continued to improve their rankings, winning gold at the European Championships, taking third place at the World Rowing Cup III and then at the 2019 World Rowing Championships in Linz-Ottensheim taking the gold medal ahead of Poland and winning Uittenbogaard and the crew a World Championship title. The crew stayed together with limited international racing in 2020 when they again won the European Championships. They commenced their 2021 campaign for the delayed Tokyo Olympics with a second placing at the 2021 European Championships and a gold medal at the World Rowing Cup II in May 2021.
