= Luca Rambaldi =

Italian rower

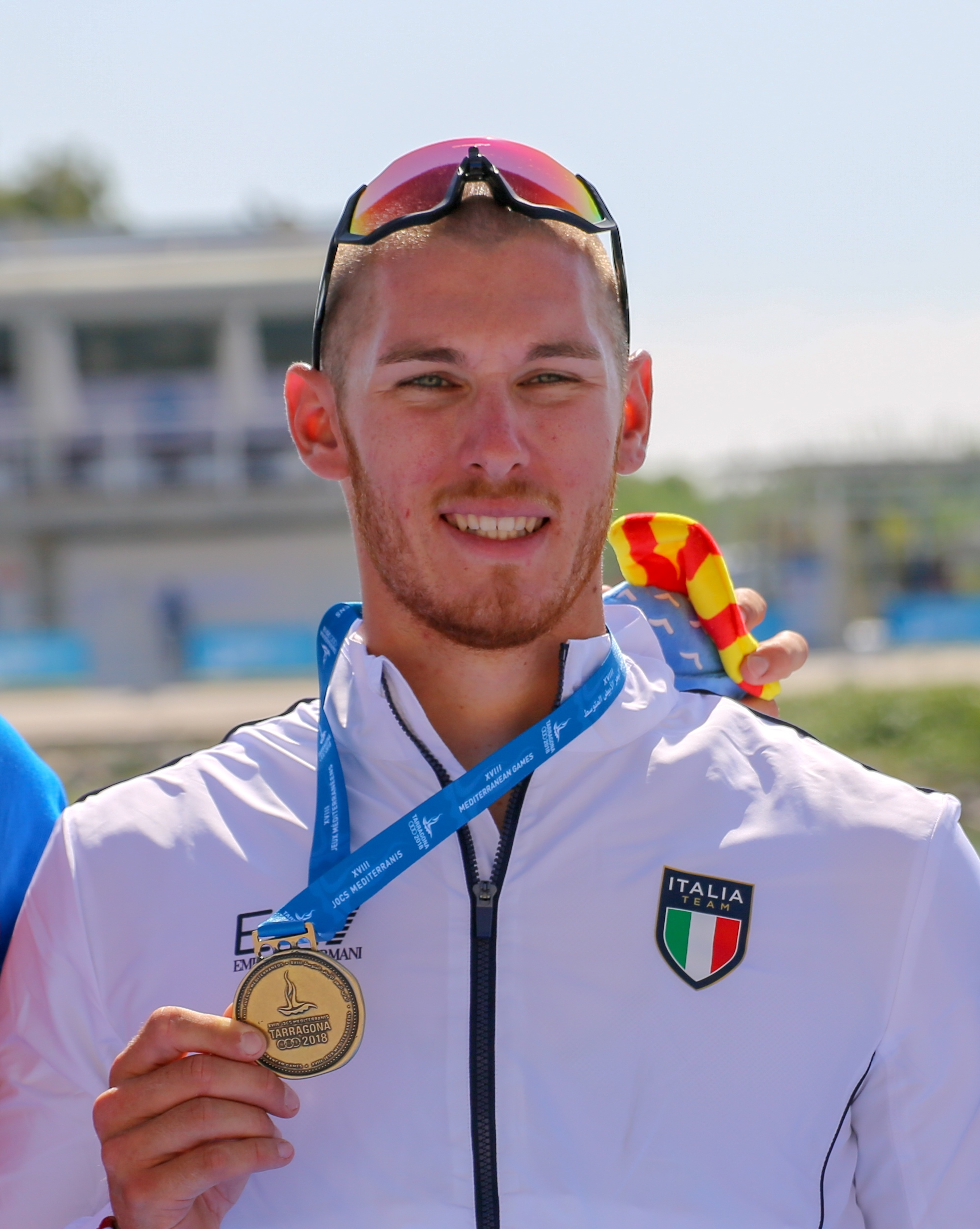
- Rambaldi in 2018

Personal information
- Born: 9 December 1994 (age 31) Ferrara, Italy
- Height: 1.91 m (6 ft 3 in)
- Weight: 89 kg (196 lb)

Sport
- Country: Italy
- Sport: Rowing
- Events: Double sculls, Quadruple sculls
- Club: Fiamme Gialle

Achievements and titles
- Olympic finals: Tokyo 2020 M4X
Medal record
World Championships
Gold medal – first place	2018 Plovdiv	Quadruple sculls
Gold medal – first place	2025 Shanghai	Quadruple sculls
Gold medal – first place	2026 Amsterdam	Quadruple sculls
Bronze medal – third place	2019 Ottensheim	Quadruple sculls

Luca Rambaldi (born 9 December 1994) is an Italian rower who won quadruple sculls gold at the 2018 World Rowing Championships and the European Rowing Championships. He placed fifth in quadruple sculls at the 2020 Summer Olympics.

== Achievements ==
Rank	Competition	Event
World Championships
Gold medal – first place	2018 Plovdiv	Quadruple sculls
Bronze medal – third place	2017 Sarasota	Double sculls
Bronze medal – third place	2019 Ottensheim	Quadruple sculls
European Championships
Gold medal – first place	2017 Račice	Double sculls
Gold medal – first place	2018 Glasgow	Quadruple sculls
Gold medal – first place	2021 Varese	Quadruple sculls
Silver medal – second place	2019 Lucerne	Quadruple sculls
Silver medal – second place	2020 Poznań	Double sculls
Silver medal – second place	2023 Bled	Double sculls
Bronze medal – third place	2013 Seville	Quadruple sculls
