= Filippo Mondelli =

Italian rower (1994–2021)

Personal information
- Nationality: Italian
- Born: 18 June 1994 Como, Italy
- Died: 29 April 2021 (aged 26) Cernobbio, Italy
- Height: 1.85 m (6 ft 1 in)
- Weight: 86 kg (190 lb)

Sport
- Country: Italy
- Sport: Rowing
- Event(s): Double sculls, Quadruple sculls
- Club: Fiamme Gialle
Medal record
Men's rowing
Representing Italy
World Championships
Gold medal – first place	2018 Plovdiv	Quadruple sculls
Bronze medal – third place	2017 Sarasota	Double sculls
Bronze medal – third place	2019 Ottensheim	Quadruple sculls
European Championships
Gold medal – first place	2017 Račice	Double sculls
Gold medal – first place	2018 Glasgow	Quadruple sculls
Silver medal – second place	2019 Lucerne	Quadruple sculls

Filippo Mondelli (18 June 1994 – 29 April 2021) was an Italian rower, gold medallist at the 2018 European Rowing Championships and at the 2018 World Rowing Championships in the men's quadruple sculls.

In February 2020 he was reported to be suffering from osteosarcoma in his left leg. He died in Cernobbio in April 2021, at the age of 26.
