= Caleb Antill =

Australian rower (born 1995)

Personal information
- Nationality: Australian
- Born: 8 August 1995 (age 30) Canberra, Australian Capital Territory
- Height: 1.88 m (6 ft 2 in)
- Weight: 92 kg (203 lb)

Sport
- Country: Australia
- Sport: Rowing
- Event: M4x
- Club: ANU Boat Club

Achievements and titles
- National finals: King's Cup (2015; President's Cup 2018-19,22; Australian champion (4X) 2017,19-22
Medal record
Men's rowing
Representing Australia
Olympic Games
Bronze medal – third place	2020 Tokyo	Quadruple sculls
World Championships
Silver medal – second place	2018 Plovdiv	Quadruple sculls
Bronze medal – third place	2022 Račice	Double sculls

Caleb Antill (born 8 August 1995) is an Australian representative rower. He is an Olympian, a multiple Australian national champion, was a 2016 U23 world champion and has represented at World Rowing Championships, winning medals in 2018 and 2022. He raced in the Australian men's quad scull at Tokyo 2021 to a bronze medal.

== Club and state rowing ==
Antill's senior club rowing has been from the ANU Boat Club.

Antill competed for the ANU Boat Club at the 2014 and 2015 Intervarsity Championships. In 2014 he rowed in the ANU eight, a coxed four and a coxless pair. In 2015 he competed in the coxed four and won the double-sculls university championship title with Luke Letcher.

Antill first made state selection for the Australian Capital Territory in their 2015 men's eight competing for the King's Cup at the Interstate Regatta. In 2018, 2019, 2022 and 2023 he was the ACT's single sculling entrant and raced for the President's Cup at the Interstate Regatta.

At the 2017 Australian Championships he won the open men's quad scull national title rowing with Luke Letcher, Hamish Playfair and David Watts. In 2019 he again won the Australian national quad scull championship in a composite SUBC /ANU Boat Club. In 2021 and 2022 he again won the Australian Championship title in the open men's quad scull in composite Australian selection crews. He won the open men's national single scull title at the 2023 Australian Rowing Championships and the open double scull title racing with Cormac Kennedy-Leverett.

== International rowing career ==
Antill made his Australian representative debut in 2016 at the World Rowing U23 Championships in Rotterdam where he raced in Australia's U23 quad scull to an U23 World Championship title and a gold medal. In 2017 he was Australia's single sculler at the U23 World Championships in Plovdiv. He made the A final and finished in sixth place. He was the men's sculling reserve at the 2017 senior World Championships in Sarasota.

He made his first Australian senior appearance in 2018 in the Australian squad scull. With Luke Letcher, Alexander Purnell and David Watts they raced at two World Rowing Cups and then at for the 2018 World Rowing Championships Letcher was changed out for Campbell Watts. With Antill in the bow seat that crew placed third in their heat and then in the repechage went out hard and alongside New Zealand they surprised the Lithuanian world champions knocking them out of the final. In the final the Australian quad rowed through most of the field from the 1000m mark and finished in second place to Italy for a silver world championship medal. In 2019 he was selected with Purnell, Watts and Cameron Girdlestone to row Australia's quad scull for the 2019 international season. They placed 2nd at the World Rowing Cup II in Poznan and 4th at WRC III in Rotterdam. Antill and David Bartholot were selected to race Australia's double scull at the 2019 World Rowing Championships in Linz, Austria. The double were looking for a top eleven finish at the 2019 World Championships to qualify for the Tokyo Olympics. They finished sixth in the B-final for an overall twelfth world place and failed to qualify the boat for Tokyo 2020.

By the time of national team selections in 2021 for the delayed Tokyo Olympics, Antill had forced his way into the Australian quad scull, which had qualified for the Olympics on 2019 performances. Antill was selected to race that boat with Cameron Girdlestone, Luke Letcher and Jack Cleary in the other seats. This combination had won the Australian national title in the quad in 2021. In Tokyo the quad won their heat and progressed straight to the A final. They were behind the lead for much of the race but winds had blown up before the event and some crews struggled with their bladework in the chop. With Antill sculling at two Australian quad kept their composure and technique and managed a bronze medal finish on the line.

Antill and Cleary were selected as the Australian men's double scull for the 2022 international season and the 2022 World Rowing Championships. Racing with Cleary in the double Antill won bronze at the World Rowing Cup II in Poznan and then with David Bartholot he took silver at the WRC III in Lucerne. At the Henley Royal Regatta in 2022 Antill and Cleary had beaten the British double to win the Double Sculls Challenge Cup. At the 2022 World Rowing Championships at Racize, he raced with Bartholot in Australia's representative double scull. They qualified for the A final and raced to a third place and a bronze medal at the World Championships.

In March 2023 Antill and Bartholot were selected as Australian men's sculling squad for the 2023 international season. At the Rowing World Cup II in Varese, Italy with Campbell Watts and Cormac Kennedy-Leverett they raced as Australia's M4X entrant. They made the A final and with Bartholot changed out for Henry Youl they finished in sixth place. At 2023's RWC III in Lucerne, with Bartholot back in the boat they again raced the M4X. Again they made the A final and in a photo finish for the bronze medal, they finished behind Romania in fourth place. At the 2023 World Rowing Championships in Belgrade Serbia, Antill, Youl, Bartholot and Cleary were selected to race Australia's quad scull. They placed third in their heat and then won their repechage to progress to the A/B semifinals. Ultimately they finished third in the B final for an overall ninth place world ranking. This result did not qualify the boat for the 2024 Paris Olympics.
