= Rowing at the 2014 Asian Games – Men's quadruple sculls =

Men's quadruple sculls at the 2014 Asian Games
- Venue: Tangeum Lake
- Date: 20–24 September 2014
- Competitors: 36 from 9 nations

Medalists
gold medal	China; Ma Jian, Liu Zhiyu, Liu Dang, Zhang Quan
silver medal	South Korea; Kim In-won, Kim Hwi-gwan, Lee Seon-soo, Choi Do-sub
bronze medal	Kazakhstan; Vitaliy Vassilyev, Mikhail Taskin, Yevgeniy Vassilyev, Vladislav Yakovlev

The men's quadruple sculls competition at the 2014 Asian Games in Chungju, South Korea was held from 20 September to 24 September at the Tangeum Lake International Rowing Center.

== Schedule ==
All times are Korea Standard Time (UTC+09:00)

Date	Time	Event
Saturday, 20 September 2014	11:20	Heats
Monday, 22 September 2014	10:40	Repechage
Wednesday, 24 September 2014	10:20	Finals

== Results ==
=== Heats ===
- Qualification: 1–2 → Final A (FA), 3–5 → Repechage (R)

==== Heat 1 ====
Rank	Team	Time	Notes
1	China (CHN); Ma Jian; Liu Zhiyu; Liu Dang; Zhang Quan	6:00.95	FA
2	Chinese Taipei (TPE); Tsai Yu-chung; Hsu Wen-chuan; Wang Ming-hui; Yu Tsung-wei	6:07.45	FA
3	Hong Kong (HKG); Leung Chun Shek; Kwan Ki Cheong; Law Hiu Fung; Wong Wai Kin	6:14.40	R
4	Iran (IRI); Siavash Saeidi; Khashayar Abbasabadi; Masoud Fathi; Saber Naderi	6:19.00	R
5	Thailand (THA); Sitthakarn Paisanwan; Poonlap Maigerd; Prem Nampratueng; Nawamin Deenoi	6:27.53	R

==== Heat 2 ====
Rank	Team	Time	Notes
1	South Korea (KOR); Kim In-won; Kim Hwi-gwan; Lee Seon-soo; Choi Do-sub	6:07.03	FA
2	Kazakhstan (KAZ); Vitaliy Vassilyev; Mikhail Taskin; Yevgeniy Vassilyev; Vladislav Yakovlev	6:08.04	FA
3	Iraq (IRQ); Ahmed Hussein; Nameer Abdul-Ridha; Mohammed Riyadh; Anas Ajeel	6:21.36	R
4	Uzbekistan (UZB); Ernazar Khamidullaev; Yuriy Sukhovlyanskiy; Abubakir Uzakbaev; Ruslan Naurzaliev	6:44.52	R

=== Repechage ===
- Qualification: 1–2 → Final A (FA), 3–5 → Final B (FB)

Rank	Team	Time	Notes
1	Hong Kong (HKG); Leung Chun Shek; Kwan Ki Cheong; Law Hiu Fung; Wong Wai Kin	6:08.90	FA
2	Iran (IRI); Siavash Saeidi; Khashayar Abbasabadi; Masoud Fathi; Saber Naderi	6:11.21	FA
3	Uzbekistan (UZB); Ernazar Khamidullaev; Yuriy Sukhovlyanskiy; Abubakir Uzakbaev; Ruslan Naurzaliev	6:14.89	FB
4	Iraq (IRQ); Ahmed Hussein; Nameer Abdul-Ridha; Mohammed Riyadh; Anas Ajeel	6:15.13	FB
5	Thailand (THA); Sitthakarn Paisanwan; Poonlap Maigerd; Prem Nampratueng; Nawamin Deenoi	6:23.38	FB

=== Finals ===
==== Final B ====
Rank	Team	Time
1	Uzbekistan (UZB); Ernazar Khamidullaev; Yuriy Sukhovlyanskiy; Abubakir Uzakbaev; Ruslan Naurzaliev	6:22.61
2	Iraq (IRQ); Ahmed Hussein; Nameer Abdul-Ridha; Mohammed Riyadh; Anas Ajeel	6:23.45
3	Thailand (THA); Sitthakarn Paisanwan; Poonlap Maigerd; Prem Nampratueng; Nawamin Deenoi	6:29.09

==== Final A ====
Rank	Team	Time
1st place, gold medalist(s)	China (CHN); Ma Jian; Liu Zhiyu; Liu Dang; Zhang Quan	6:29.57
2nd place, silver medalist(s)	South Korea (KOR); Kim In-won; Kim Hwi-gwan; Lee Seon-soo; Choi Do-sub	6:36.44
3rd place, bronze medalist(s)	Kazakhstan (KAZ); Vitaliy Vassilyev; Mikhail Taskin; Yevgeniy Vassilyev; Vladislav Yakovlev	6:37.66
4	Iran (IRI); Siavash Saeidi; Khashayar Abbasabadi; Masoud Fathi; Saber Naderi	6:42.70
5	Hong Kong (HKG); Leung Chun Shek; Kwan Ki Cheong; Law Hiu Fung; Wong Wai Kin	6:45.13
6	Chinese Taipei (TPE); Tsai Yu-chung; Hsu Wen-chuan; Wang Ming-hui; Yu Tsung-wei	6:51.18
