= Alexander Belonogoff =

Australian rower (born 1990)

Personal information
- Born: 17 April 1990 (age 36) Moura, Queensland
- Education: Rockhampton Grammar School

Sport
- Country: Australia
- Sport: Rowing
- Club: Sydney University Boat Club
Medal record
Men's rowing
Representing Australia
Olympic Games
| Silver medal – second place | 2016 Rio de Janeiro | Quad scull |
World Championships
| Bronze medal – third place | 2014 Amsterdam | M2x |
U23 World Championships
| Bronze medal – third place | 2009 Racize | M4x |
| Bronze medal – third place | 2012 Trakai | M4x |
Junior World Championships
| Bronze medal – third place | 2008 Linz | M2x |

Alexander Belonogoff (born 17 April 1990) is an Australian rower. He is an Australian national champion, an Olympic silver medallist who has represented at World Championships.

== Personal ==
Known as "Sasha", Belonogoff was born in Moura, Queensland and raised in Rockhampton. He attended Moura State Primary School and Rockhampton Grammar School. He studied for a B Applied Science at the University of Sydney. He is a rural doctor living and working in Far North Queensland with his wife and three young sons. His family is Russian.

== Club and national career ==
Belonogoff rows from the Sydney University Boat Club. For the five consecutive years 2011 to 2015 he was the New South Wales state representative selected to race for the Presidents Cup - the men's single scull - in the Interstate Regatta at the Australian Rowing Championships. He won that event in 2014 and 2015.

== International rowing career ==
Belonogoff's Australian representative debut was in a double scull with Nicholas Barneier at the 2008 Junior World Rowing Championships in Linz, Austria. They rowed to a bronze medal. In 2009, 2010 and 2012 he represented at the World Rowing U23 Championships in a quad scull in respectively Racice, Brest and Trakai. He won bronze medals in 2009 and 2012.

In 2013 Belonogoff contested three World Rowing Cups in either a double scull or a quad scull and then at the 2013 World Rowing Championships he competed in the double scull which placed eighth overall. In 2014 he again competed in three World Rowing Cups in either a double scull or a quad scull and then at the 2014 World Rowing Championships in Amsterdam he won bronze in the men's double racing with James McRae. He continued to compete for Australian at every opportunity in 2015 racing at two World Cups and at the 2015 World Championships to fifth place in the double scull. Then in 2016 he competed and won the silver medal in the quadruple scull at the 2016 Summer Olympics in a crew with McRae, Karsten Forsterling and Cameron Girdlestone.
