= Ilya Kondratyev =

Russian rower

Personal information
- Nationality: Russia
- Born: 27 March 1990 (age 35); Kaluga, Russia

Sport
- Sport: Rowing

Ilya Dmitriyevich Kondratyev (Russian: Илья Дмитриевич Кондратьев, born 27 March 1990) is a Russian rower. He competed in the 2020 Summer Olympics.
