= Koen Metsemakers =

Dutch rower

Personal information
- Nationality: Dutch
- Born: 30 April 1992 (age 34) Hasselt, Overijssel

Sport
- Country: Netherlands
- Sport: Rowing
- Event: Quadruple sculls
Medal record
Men's rowing
Representing the Netherlands
Olympic Games
Gold medal – first place	2024 Paris	Quadruple sculls
Gold medal – first place	2020 Tokyo	Quadruple sculls
World Championships
Gold medal – first place	2019 Ottensheim	Quadruple sculls
Gold medal – first place	2023 Belgrade	Quadruple sculls
European Championships
Gold medal – first place	2019 Lucerne	Quadruple sculls
Gold medal – first place	2020 Poznań	Quadruple sculls
Silver medal – second place	2021 Varese	Quadruple sculls
Silver medal – second place	2023 Bled	Quadruple sculls

Koen Metsemakers, born 30 April 1992 (age 34), is a Dutch rower. He has won multiple World- and European championship gold medals and is a double Olympic gold medalist at both the 2020 Summer Olympics and the 2024 Summer Olympics in the men's quadruple sculls (M4x). He is also a current world's best time holder in that boat class.

== International representative rowing ==
Metsemakers Dutch representative debut came in 2016 when he raced in a double-scull at the World Rowing Cup III. The following year he secured a seat in the Dutch quad-scull and raced in that boat at all three World Rowing Cups, the European Championships and the 2017 World Rowing Championships in Sarasota, Florida where they finished in overall fourth place. He held that seat in 2018 again competing at three World Rowing Cups, the 2018 European Championships and the 2018 World Rowing Championships in Plovdiv.

In 2019 with Metsemakers at stroke and Stefan Broenink changed out for Tone Wieten, the Dutch quad continued to improve their rankings, winning gold at the European Championships, taking third place at the World Rowing Cup III and then at the 2019 World Rowing Championships in Linz-Ottensheim taking the gold medal ahead of Poland and winning a World Championship title. The crew stayed together with limited international racing in 2020 when they again won the European Championships.

They commenced their 2021 campaign for the delayed Tokyo Olympics with a second placing at the 2021 European Championships and a gold medal at the World Rowing Cup II in May 2021.

In 2022 Metsemakers participated at World Rowing Cup I and II in the men's double sculls (M2x) together with Stef Broenink. In the first World Rowing Cup he placed first in the B-final, and improved on that with a bronze medal in the second World Cup.

In 2023 Metsemakers won a silver medal at the European Rowing Championships in the men's quadruple sculls, only coming 2nd to the previous year's world champions of Poland. Metsemakers then competed at World Rowing Cup III and the following World Rowing Championships, winning both.

In 2024 Metsemakers competed at World Rowing Cup I and II in the men's quadruple sculls, winning both. At the 2024 Summer Olympics Metsemakers won his 2nd Olympic gold medal in the men's quadruple sculls.

== Personal ==
Metsemakers took up rowing while studying at Radboud University in Nijmegen, becoming a member of the university's rowing society N.S.R.V. Phocas. He completed a master's degree in Dentistry and then commenced medical studies at Vrije Universiteit Amsterdam.
