= Harry Leask =

British rower (born 1995)

Personal information
- Full name: Harry D. Leask
- Born: 16 October 1995 (age 30) Edinburgh, Scotland, United Kingdom
- Height: 195 cm (6 ft 5 in)

Sport
- Sport: Rowing
- Club: Leander Club
Medal record
Men's rowing
Representing Great Britain
Olympic Games
Silver medal – second place	2020 Tokyo	Quadruple sculls
World Championships
Silver medal – second place	2022 Račice	Quadruple sculls
European Championships
Bronze medal – third place	2018 Glasgow	Double sculls

Harry D. Leask (born 16 October 1995) is a British rower.

== Rowing career ==
In 2021, he won a European bronze medal in the double sculls in Glasgow.

He has been selected for the British team to compete in the rowing events, in the quadruple sculls for the 2020 Summer Olympics.
