= Martin Helseth =

Norwegian rower (born 1994)

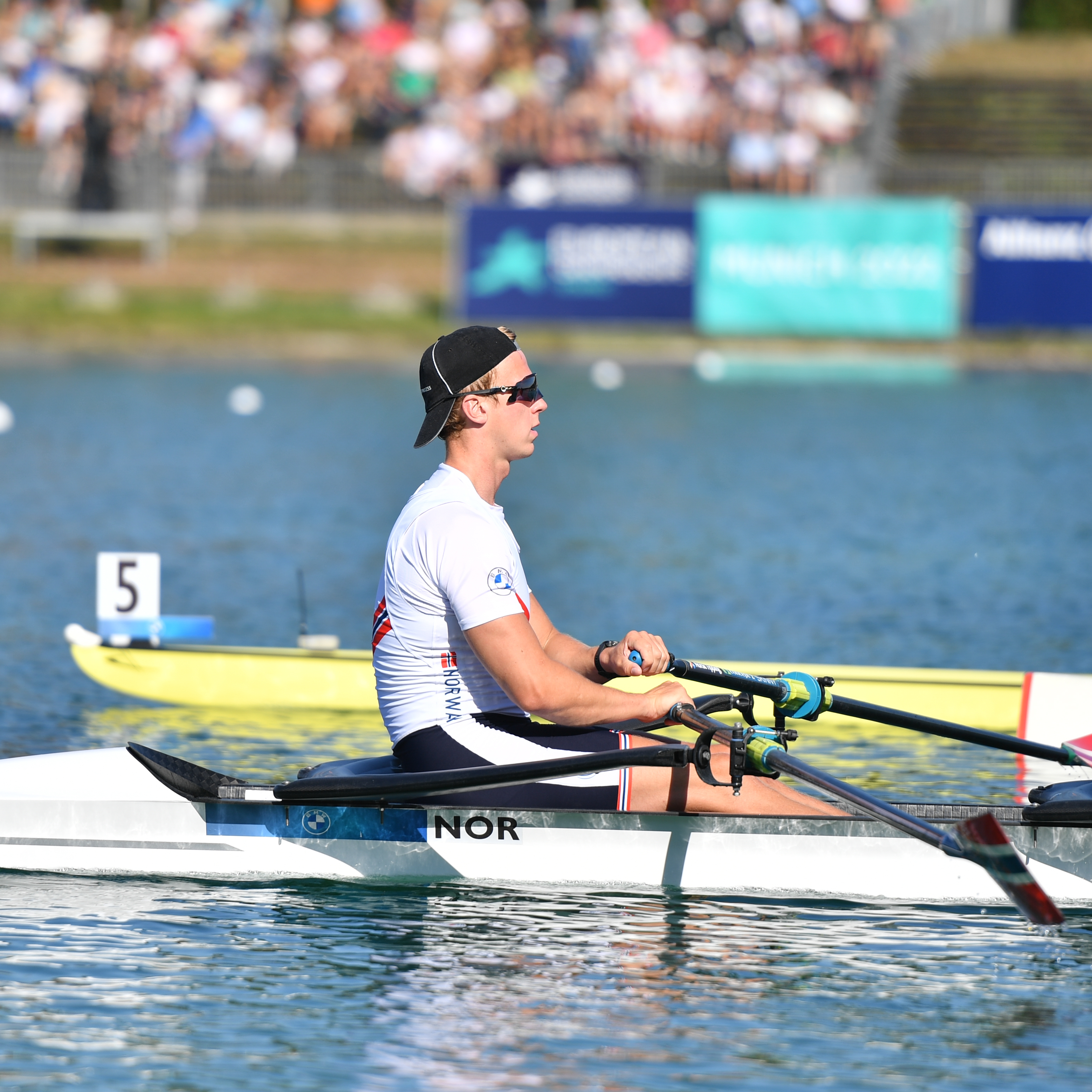

Personal information
- Born: 11 July 1994 (age 31) Ålesund, Norway
- Height: 192 cm (6 ft 4 in)

Sport
- Sport: Rowing
- Club: Aalesund Roklub

Martin Helseth (born 11 July 1994) is a Norwegian competitive rower, born in Ålesund.

He competed at the 2020 Summer Olympics in Tokyo 2021, in men's quadruple sculls.

He won national titles in single scull in 2016, 2017, 2018, 2021 and 2022.
