= Wiktor Chabel =

Polish rower (born 1985)

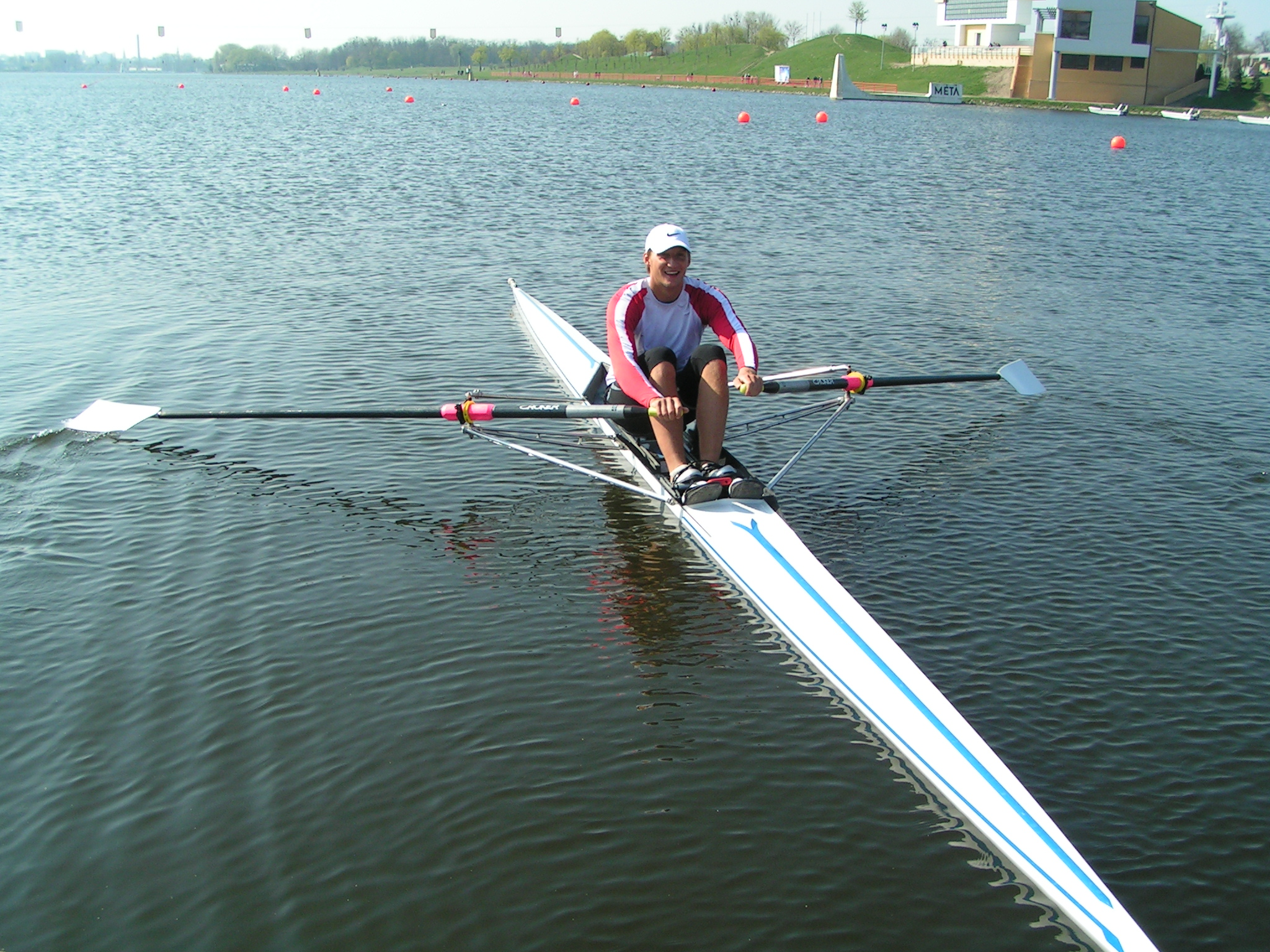

Personal information
- Nationality: Polish
- Born: 23 November 1985 (age 40) Sandomierz, Poland
- Height: 1.97 m (6 ft 6 in)
- Weight: 92 kg (203 lb)

Sport
- Country: Poland
- Sport: Rowing
- Event: Quadruple sculls
- Club: Krakow AZS-AWF

Achievements and titles
- Olympic finals: Tokyo 2020 M4X
Medal record
Men's rowing
Representing Poland
World Championships
Silver medal – second place	2019 Ottensheim	Quadruple sculls
European Championships
Silver medal – second place	2017 Račice	Quadruple sculls
Bronze medal – third place	2009 Brest	Quadruple sculls
Bronze medal – third place	2011 Plovdiv	Quadruple sculls
Bronze medal – third place	2018 Glasgow	Quadruple sculls

Wiktor Chabel (born 23 November 1985) is a Polish rower. He competed in the men's quadruple sculls event at the 2016 Summer Olympics. In October 2017 he married a Polish rower Monika Ciaciuch.
