= Hamish Playfair =

Australian rower (born 1991)

Personal information
- Born: 21 December 1991 (age 34)
- Education: Shore School
- Relative: Judy Playfair

Sport
- Country: Australia
- Sport: Rowing
- Club: Sydney University Boat Club; UTS Haberfield Rowing Club

Achievements and titles
- National finals: King's Cup 2017 – 2019; Australian champion 4X 2017

Hamish Playfair (born 21 December 1991) is an Australian rower. He is a four-time national champion and an Australian representative at World Rowing Championships.

== Club and state rowing ==
Raised in Sydney, Playfair was educated and introduced to rowing at Shore School. His senior rowing was initially from the Sydney University Boat Club and then from 2017 he moved to the UTS Haberfield Rowing Club.

He debuted at state representative level for New South Wales in the 2010 youth eight which contested the Noel Wilkinson Trophy at the Interstate Regatta within the 2010 Australian Rowing Championships. He rowed again in the New South Wales youth eight in 2011 when they placed second at the Interstate Regatta.

He first rowed in the New South Wales men's senior eight when they won the 2017 King's Cup at the Interstate Regatta. He rowed again to King's Cup victories in the 2018 and 2019 New South Wales men's eight.

At the 2017 Australian Championships he won the open men's quad scull national title rowing with Luke Letcher, Caleb Antill and David Watts.

== International representative rowing ==
Playfair made his Australian representative debut in 2013 in an U23 quad scull at the World Rowing Cup III in Lucerne. That quad went on to the 2013 World Rowing U23 Championships in Linz where they finished in overall ninth place. In 2014 he stroked Australia's second quad at the World Rowing Cup I and took bronze.

After moving to the UTS Haberfield Rowing Club in 2017 Playfair came into senior Australian representative contention as a sweep oared rower. He rowed a coxless pair at the World Rowing Cup II in Poznan with Simon Keenan and won the B Final. He was in the three seat of the Australian eight for the WRC III in Lucerne when they took a silver medal. He rowed at bow in the Australian eight at the 2017 World Rowing Championships in Sarasota when they missed the A final and finished in overall eighth.

Playfair did make the Australian squad for the 2018 international representative season (selected in the Men's Quadruple Scull) however due to illness he had to withdraw from the team. At the end of that year he came back into the Australian senior training squad for the 2018/19 season. In 2019 he was selected with Campbell Watts to row Australia's double scull for the 2019 international season. They placed 5th at the World Rowing Cup II in Poznan and 6th at WRC III in Rotterdam. With Cameron Girdlestone and Campbell and David Watts, Playfair was selected to race Australia's quad scull at the 2019 World Rowing Championships in Linz, Austria. The quad were looking for a top eight finish at the 2019 World Championships to qualify for the Tokyo Olympics. They won their heat and placed third in semi-final, thereby qualifying the boat for the A-final and the Tokyo 2020. They finished in overall world fourth place.

== Establishment family ==
Playfair is the great-grandson of the Sydney businessman, politician and soldier Thomas Alfred "Jack" Playfair. Jack's grandfather John Thomas Playfair had founded a successful wholesale meat business in The Rocks, Sydney provisioning Sydney's shipping trade. Hamish is the nephew of Judy Playfair an Australian breaststroke swimmer, who won a silver medal in the 4×100-metre medley relay at the 1968 Mexico Olympics. Hamish's own father Angus also rowed for New South Wales in the youth eight of 1981. and died of melanoma in 2009 when Hamish was aged eighteen.
