= David Watts (rower) =

Australian rower (born 1992)

Personal information
- Nationality: Australian
- Born: 5 February 1992 (age 34)
- Height: 1.91 m (6 ft 3 in)
- Weight: 95 kg (209 lb)

Sport
- Country: Australia
- Sport: Rowing
- Club: Sydney Rowing Club

Achievements and titles
- Olympic finals: 2016 Rio Olympics M2X, 7th
- National finals: King's Cup (8+) 2014-16; President's Cup (1X) 2018; Aust champion (4X) 2017
Medal record
Representing Australia
World Championships
Silver medal – second place	2015 Aiguebelette	Quadruple sculls
Silver medal – second place	2018 Plovdiv	Quadruple sculls

David Watts (born 5 February 1992) is an Australian rower. A national champion and national representative, he is a 2016 Olympian and won silver medals at the 2015 and 2018 World Rowing Championships.

== School, club and state rowing ==
Watts was born in England before moving to Perth, Western Australia. As a child he was a successful state swimmer and a young member of a teenage squad which swam across the arduous English Channel establishing himself as a determined, young athlete, aged 13 years. He moved to the sport of rowing after being identified as a talented athlete by the Western Australian Institute of Sport's Talent Identification Program. He attended a public school, Churchlands SHS then Trinity College, Perth for year 12 . He was a welcome member of their champion 1st VIII of 2009.

He won numerous medals at state level and first represented Australia in Ottensheim in the Junior Men's World Championships, in the four, at the young age of 16, stroking the boat and finishing a very respectable 4th place in the A final. In 2009, aged 17, he won the Australian National Schoolboy's single scull (representing Trinity College, Perth), the under 19 single scull, two further gold medals and one silver in various crew boats. Earlier that year, aged 16, he also claimed the long-standing W.A. PSA indoor ergometer record.

Watts' senior rowing was initially from the Swan River Rowing Club in Perth, and later the Sydney Rowing Club when he moved east for national representation.

From 2007 until the present, Watts has won numerous National medals in various boats, both sweep and sculling. He has rowed regularly in Western Australian men's senior eights contesting the King's Cup at the Australian Rowing Championships.

== International rowing career ==
Watts made a number of underage appearances for Australia – at the 2008 and 2010 Junior World Rowing Championships; the inaugural 2010 Youth Olympics as one of only two, Australian male rowers selected and the 2012 and 2014 World Rowing U23 Championships, winning three bronze medals, including one at the Youth Olympics, Singapore.

At the 2015 World Rowing Championships on Lac d'Aiguebelette, France, as the crew's youngest rower, he stroked the men's quadruple scull (M4x) to a silver medal with David Crawshay, Karsten Forsterling and Cameron Girdlestone. qualifying the quad for the Rio Olympics.

In 2016 Watts was selected to stroke Australia's double scull at the 2016 Summer Olympics with Chris Morgan, successfully winning the B final in an extremely competitive boat class.

In 2017 Watts rowed Australia's double scull with Luke Letcher at two World Rowing Cups in Europe and then at the 2017 World Rowing Championships where they finished in a disappointing seventeenth place. In 2018 he had more success with a new crew of Caleb Antill, Nicholas Purnell and Campbell Watts when he again stroked the quad to a silver medal success in Plovdiv, Bulgaria, rowing through most of the field from the 1000m mark and finishing in second place just behind Italy, eliminating the world champions, Lithuania, along the way.

In 2018 he was Western Australia's selected representative in the single sculls event – contesting the President's Cup – at the Interstate Regatta, winning the silver medal.

In 2019 he was selected with Alex Purnell, Antill and Girdlestone to row Australia's quad scull for the 2019 international season. They placed 2nd at the World Rowing Cup II in Poznan and 4th at WRC III in Rotterdam. With Girdlestone, Campbell Watts and Hamish Playfair, Watts was again selected as the experienced stroke seat to race Australia's quad scull at the 2019 World Rowing Championships in Linz, Austria. The quad were looking for a top eight finish at the 2019 World Championships to qualify for the Tokyo Olympics. They won their heat and placed third in the semi-final, thereby qualifying the boat for the A-final and the Olympics in Tokyo 2020. They finished in overall world fourth place.

In May, 2021 at the final Olympic qualification regatta in Lucerne, Switzerland, after already qualifying the Australian men's quad for the Tokyo Olympics together with Campbell Watts, they attempted to qualify the men's double scull for Australia which had failed to qualify in 2019. The Watts crew made the A final, finishing a close 3rd place after a hard-fought battle and missed the Olympic cut-off qualification by one second.

Watts is one of Australia's top scullers who stroked two quad sculls towards Olympic qualification, Rio 2016 and Tokyo 2020/21. His leadership skills were observed and encouraged by Rowing Australia and he is a member of their Ambassador program and Athlete's Commission 2020/21.
