= Oscar Stabe Helvig =

Norwegian rower

Personal information
- Full name: Jan Oscar Stabe Helvig
- Born: 2 October 1995 (age 30) Oslo, Norway
- Height: 201 cm (6 ft 7 in)

Sport
- Country: Norway
- Sport: Rowing
- Event(s): Quadruple sculls, Double sculls
- Club: Norske Studenters Roklub

Jan Oscar Stabe Helvig (born 2 October 1995) is a Norwegian competitive rower, born in Oslo. Also known as Oscar Stabe Helvig or Oscar Helvig, he competed at the 2020 Summer Olympics in Tokyo 2021, in men's quadruple sculls and in the same event at the 2024 Summer Olympics.

Helvig also competed in double sculls or quadruple sculls events at the World Rowing Championships (2017, 2018, 2019, 2022 and 2023) and the European Rowing Championships (2015, 2017, 2018, 2019, 2021 and 2022).
