= Cameron Girdlestone =

Australian rower

Personal information
- Born: Sydney, New South Wales, Australia
- Education: The King's School

Sport
- Country: Australia
- Sport: Rowing
- Club: Sydney University Boat Club

Achievements and titles
- National finals: President's Cup 2010,19-21; King's Cup 2016; Aust champion (4X) 2019,21-22; Aust champion (2X) 2019; Aust champion (1X) 2021
Medal record
Men's rowing
Representing Australia
Olympic Games
Silver medal – second place	2016 Rio de Janeiro	Quad scull
Bronze medal – third place	2020 Tokyo	Quad scull
World Championships
Silver medal – second place	2015 Aiguebelette	M4x

Cameron Girdlestone is an Australian representative rower. He is a five-time Australian national champion, a medalist at World Championships, a dual Olympian and an Olympic silver and bronze medallist. He raced in the Australian men's quad scull at the Tokyo 2020 Olympics to a bronze medal.

== Personal life ==
Cameron Girdlestone was born in Sydney and attended Samuel Gilbert Primary school. He took up rowing at high school at The King's School, Parramatta.

At the conclusion of the 2020 Tokyo Olympics he was elected as a member of the AOC's Athlete's Commission.

== Club and national career ==
Girdlestone rows from the Sydney University Boat Club. He first rowed in the Interstate Regatta at the Australian Rowing Championships in 2010 representing New South Wales in the men's single scull in the President's Cup event. In 2016 he was seated in the New South Wales state eight which placed second in the King's Cup that year.

At the 2019 Australian Championships he won the open men's double scull national title with his SUBC clubmate Campbell Watts and he stroked a composite quad scull to win the open men's quad title. In 2021 he won an Australian Championship title in the open men's single scull and also won a national title in the open men's quad scull. In 2019 and 2021 he was the New South Wales representative sculler to contest the President's Cup at the Interstate Regatta. In 2022 he won another national open men's quad scull title in a composite Australian selection crew.

== International rowing career ==
At the 2015 World Rowing Championships on Lac d'Aiguebelette in Aiguebelette France he finished 2nd in the men's quadruple sculls (M4x) event, rowing with David Crawshay, Karsten Forsterling and David Watts.

In the quadruple scull at the 2016 Rio Olympics in a crew with James McRae, Karsten Forsterling and Alexander Belonogoff he won the silver medal. In 2019 he was selected with Alex Purnell, David Watts and Caleb Antill to row Australia's quad scull for the 2019 international season. They placed 2nd at the World Rowing Cup II in Poznan and 4th at WRC III in Rotterdam. With Hamish Playfair and Campbell and David Watts, Girdlestone was selected to race Australia's quad scull at the 2019 World Rowing Championships in Linz, Austria. The quad were looking for a top eight finish at the 2019 World Championships to qualify for the Tokyo Olympics. They won their heat and placed third in semi-final, thereby qualifying the boat for the A-final and the Tokyo 2020. They finished in fourth place.

By the time of national team selections in 2021 for the delayed Tokyo Olympics, Girdlestone was the sole crew member who'd qualified the boat for Tokyo to be picked to race it. Girdlestone was selected at stroke with Caleb Antill, Luke Letcher and Jack Cleary in the other seats. This combination had won the Australian national title in the quad in 2021. In Tokyo the quad won their heat and progressed straight to the A final. They were behind the lead for much of the race but winds had blown up before the event and some crews struggled with their blade-work in the chop. With Girdlestone sculling at three Australian quad kept their composure and technique and managed a bronze medal finish on the line.
