= Szymon Pośnik =

Polish rower

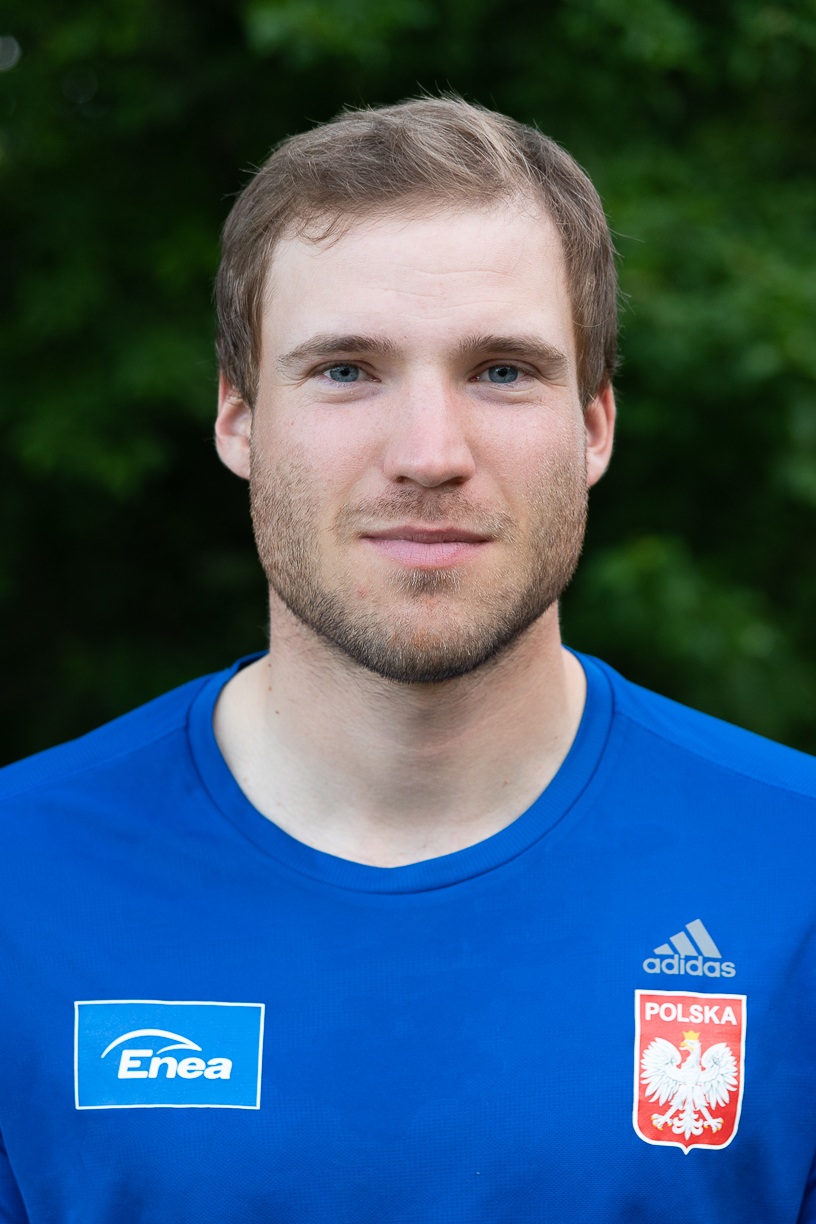
- Polish rower Szymon Pośnik

Personal information
- Nationality: Polish
- Born: 15 June 1993 (age 33)
- Height: 1.88 m (6 ft 2 in)
- Weight: 77 kg (170 lb)

Sport
- Country: Poland
- Sport: Rowing
- Event: Quadruple sculls
- Club: Warszawa MOS nr 2

Achievements and titles
- Olympic finals: Tokyo 2020 M4X
Medal record
Men's rowing
Representing Poland
World Championships
Silver medal – second place	2019 Ottensheim	Quadruple sculls
European Championships
Bronze medal – third place	2018 Glasgow	Quadruple sculls

Szymon Pośnik (born 15 June 1993) is a Polish rower.

He won a medal at the 2019 World Rowing Championships.
