= Alexander Purnell =

Australian rower (born 1995)

Alex Purnell OAM
Personal information
- Full name: Alexander Purnell
- Nationality: Australian
- Born: 30 January 1995 (age 31) St Leonards, New South Wales Australia
- Education: Shore School
- Height: 1.95 m (6 ft 5 in)
- Weight: 88 kg (194 lb)

Sport
- Country: Australia
- Sport: Rowing
- Event: M4x
- Club: Sydney Uni Boat Club

Achievements and titles
- National finals: King's Cup 2017 - 2022
Medal record
Men's rowing
Representing Australia
Olympic Games
Gold medal – first place	2020 Tokyo	Coxless four
World Championships
Silver medal – second place	2018 Plovdiv	Quadruple sculls
Silver medal – second place	2022 Račice	Coxless four

Alexander (Steve) Purnell OAM (born 30 January 1995) is an Australian rower. He is an Olympic and national champion who has represented Australia at underage and senior world championships. In 2018 in an Australian eight, he won the Grand Challenge Cup at the Henley Royal Regatta. He rowed in the bow seat of the Australian men's coxless four to a gold medal victory at the Tokyo Olympics.

== Varsity, club and state rowing ==
Purnell began his rowing career at Shore School in Sydney. His senior club rowing has been from the Sydney University Boat Club.

Purnell competed for the SUBC at the 2014 and 2015 Intervarsity Championships. In 2014, he rowed in the Sydney University eight and a coxed four and won both titles. In 2015 he rowed in the double scull and the eight and took the title in the eight. With Marcus Britt he won the open men's national coxless pair title at the 2023 Australian Rowing Championships. At the 2023 Australian Rowing Championships he won the open coxless four national title in an all SUBC crew.

He first made state selection for New South Wales in the 2013 youth eight contesting the Noel Wilkinson Trophy at the Interstate Regatta within the Australian Rowing Championships. He again raced in the New South Wales youth eight in 2014 and 2015, rowing to an Interstate championship victory in 2015.

In 2017, he was selected to stroke the New South Wales senior men's eight competing for the King's Cup at the Interstate Regatta. Purnell raced in three consecutive King's Cup victories for New South Wales from 2017 to 2019. He rowed in the seat behind his older brother Nicholas Purnell in those 2018 and 2019 victories. Nicholas is himself an Australian representative and Olympian rower and was selected as a 2021 Tokyo Olympian. In Tokyo the brothers became the first to row in the same Australian Olympic squad since the Stewart brothers. Alex again rowed in the New South Wales men's King's Cup eights of 2021, 2022 and 2023, stroking the 2022 and 2023 crews to victory.

== International representative rowing ==
Alex Purnell made his Australian representative debut in 2013 in a junior quad scull which contested the 2013 Junior World Rowing Championships in Trakai to an eleventh place finish. In 2015 he was selected in an U23 quad scull which competed at the World Rowing U23 Championships in Plovdiv and rowed to a bronze medal. The following year at the 2016 World Rowing U23 Championships in Rotterdam he was seated in the Australian U23 eight which raced to a seventh place finish.

2017 saw Purnell elevated to the Australian senior squad and into the men's eight. He raced in the eight at two World Rowing Cups in Europe and then at the 2017 World Rowing Championships in Sarasota to a seventh placing.

Purnell was selected in the Australian squad for their 2018 international tour. He rowed in the quad scull to a fourth place at the World Rowing Cup II in Linz, Austria. In the touring party's second regatta of the 2018 season Purnell was seated in the Australian men's eight racing as the Georgina Hope Rinehart National Training Centre, in honour of Rowing Australia patron, Gina Rinehart. That eight won the 2018 Grand Challenge Cup at the Henley Royal Regatta - the fourth Australian men's eight to ever do so. He was back in the Australian quad for the 2018 World Rowing Championships in Plovdiv. That crew placed third in their heat and then in the repechage they went out hard and alongside New Zealand they surprised the Lithuanian world champions knocking them out of the final. In the final the Australian quad rowed through most of the field from the 1000m mark and finished in second place for a silver world championship medal.

In 2019, he was selected with Caleb Antill, David Watts and Cameron Girdlestone to row Australia's quad scull for the 2019 international season. They placed 2nd at the World Rowing Cup II in Poznan and 4th at WRC III in Rotterdam. Purnell was then selected to race in the Australian men's eight at the 2019 World Rowing Championships in Linz, Austria. The eight were looking for a top five finish at the 2019 World Championships to qualify for the Tokyo Olympics. The eight placed second in their heat and fourth in the final and qualified for Tokyo 2020.

By the time of national team selections in 2021 for the delayed Tokyo Olympics, Purnell had forced his way into the Australian coxless four, which had qualified for the Olympics on 2019 performances. Purnell was selected to join the former two-time world champions Jack Hargreaves, Alexander Hill and Spencer Turrin in that boat. This combination had won the 2021 Australian national title in the coxless four.

In Tokyo the Australian coxless four won their heat and progressed straight to the A final where they held a lead from the first 500m, and were being challenged by the British four who lost their steering and control in the final 500m. With Purnell steering straight and true from the bow seat the Australians kept their composure and held off the Romanians in a tight finish, taking the gold in an Olympic best time.

In March 2022 Purnell, Hargreaves, Turrin and Jack O'Brien were selected as the men's four in the Australian team for the 2022 international season and the 2022 World Rowing Championships. They took gold at the World Rowing Cup II in Poznan in June, won the Stewards Challenge Cup at the Henley Royal Regatta in July and a week later finished second at the WRC III in Lucerne. At the 2022 World Rowing Championships at Racize, he rowed in the Australian coxless four to a silver medal.

With Alex Hill's renewed intention, in March 2023 selectors picked Purnell, Turrin, Hargreaves and Hill as the Australian coxless four for the 2023 international season and world championship preparation. At the Rowing World Cup II in Varese, Italy they raced as Australia's M4- entrant. They made the A final and won the silver medal behind the Great Britain four. At 2023's RWC III in Lucerne, that unchanged four again raced the M4-. They won their heat and semi but again were beaten into second place by Great Britain in the A final. That crew was selected intact as Australia's coxless four for the 2023 World Rowing Championships in Belgrade Serbia. They placed second in their heat. They placed 3rd in the A/B semi-final at which point they qualified an Australian M4- boat for the 2024 Paris Olympics. In the A final the Australian four finished fifth, giving them a fifth place world ranking from the regatta.

== Accolades ==
In the 2022 Australia Day Honours Purnell was awarded the Medal of the Order of Australia.

== Personal ==
He is the partner of frontline worker, Laura Triggs.
