= Yi Xudi =

Chinese rower

Personal information
- Nationality: China
- Born: 20 August 1993 (age 33)

Sport
- Sport: Rowing
Medal record
Men's rowing
Representing China
Asian Games
Gold medal – first place	2022 Hangzhou	Quadruple sculls
Gold medal – first place	2026 Aichi–Nagoya	Double sculls

Yi Xudi (born 20 August 1993) is a Chinese rower. He competed in the 2020 Summer Olympics.
