= Liu Dang =

Chinese rower (born 1989)

Personal information
- Nationality: Chinese
- Born: 17 August 1989 (age 36)

Sport
- Sport: Rowing
- Event: Quadruple sculls
Medal record
Men's rowing
Representing China
Asian Games
Gold medal – first place	2014 Incheon	Quadruple sculls

Liu Dang (Chinese: 刘荡, born 17 August 1989) is a Chinese rower. He competed in the 2020 Summer Olympics.
