= Zang Ha =

Chinese rower

Personal information
- Nationality: Chinese
- Born: 14 March 1996 (age 30)

Sport
- Country: China
- Sport: Rowing
Medal record
Men's rowing
Representing China
Asian Games
Gold medal – first place	2022 Hangzhou	Quadruple sculls

Zang Ha (born 14 March 1996) is a Chinese rower. He competed in the 2020 Summer Olympics.
