= Zhang Quan =

Chinese rower

Personal information
- Nationality: Chinese
- Born: 14 September 1990 (age 35) Dongguan, China

Sport
- Sport: Rowing
- Event: Quadruple sculls
Medal record
Men's rowing
Representing China
Asian Games
Gold medal – first place	2014 Incheon	Quadruple sculls

Zhang Quan (Chinese: 张全, born 14 September 1990) is a Chinese rower. He competed in the 2020 Summer Olympics.
