= Artyom Kosov =

Russian rower

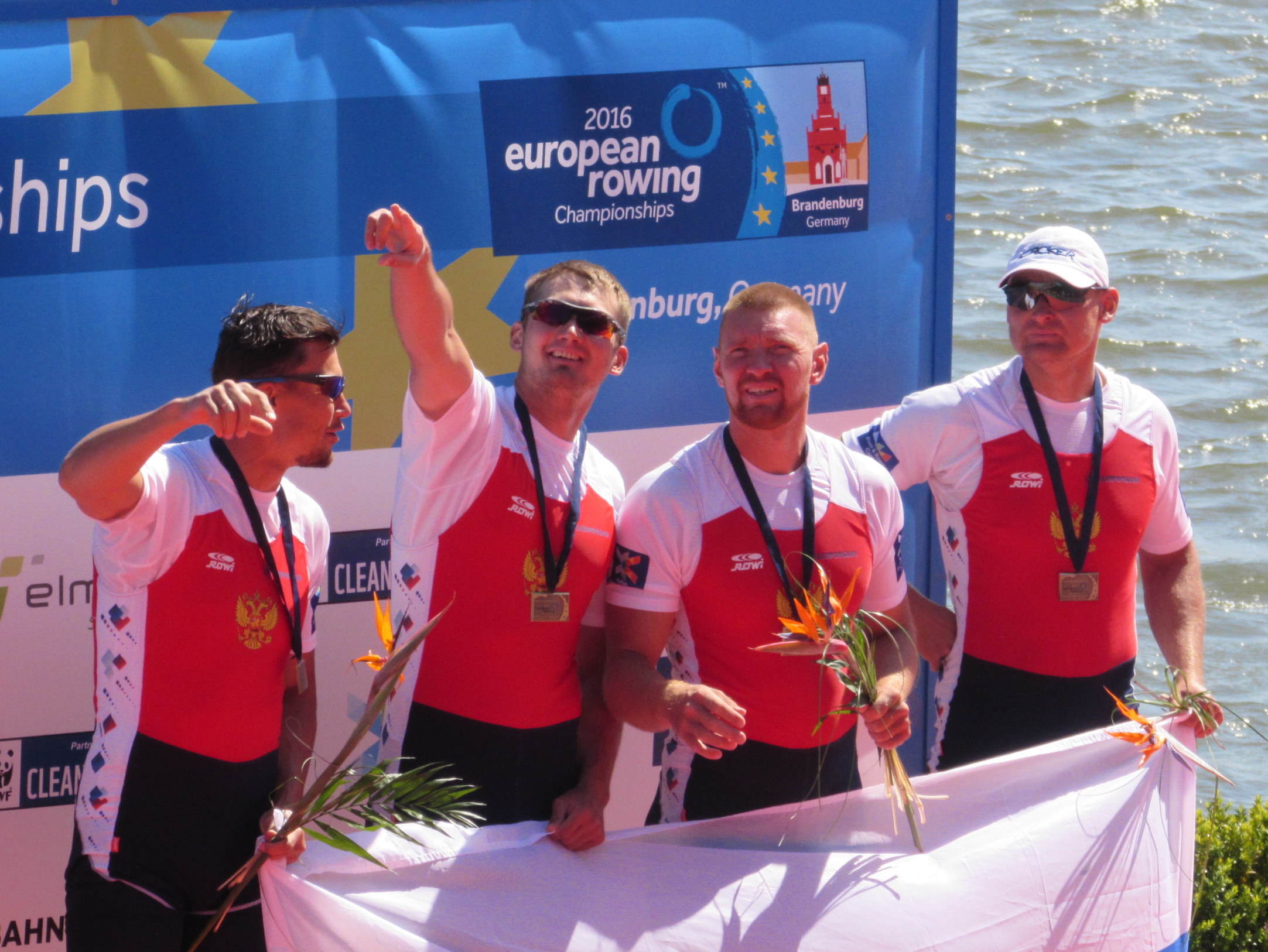

Personal information
- Nationality: (Russia) Russian
- Born: 4 August 1986 (age 39) Kazan, RSFSR, USSR (now Russia)
- Height: 193 cm (6 ft 4 in)
- Weight: 85 kg (187 lb)

Sport
- Sport: Rowing
- Club: azan Aviator
Medal record
Representing Russia
European Championships
Bronze medal – third place	2011 Plovdiv	M2x
Silver medal – second place	2014 Belgrade	M8+
Bronze medal – third place	2014 Poznan	M8+

Artyom Vyacheslavovich Kosov (Russian: Артём Вячеславович Косов, born 4 August 1986) is a Russian rower who won three medals at the European championships in 2011–2015. He was disqualified from competing in the quadruple sculls at the 2016 Summer Olympics after his teammate Sergey Fedorovtsev failed a drug test in 2016.
