= Pavel Sorin =

Russian rower

Medal record

Men's rowing

Representing Russia

European Championships
Gold medal – first place	2015 Poznan	M4x

Representing Uzbekistan

Asian Games
Silver medal – second place	2026 Aichi–Nagoya	Double sculls
Bronze medal – third place	2026 Aichi–Nagoya	Quadruple sculls

Pavel Mikhailovich Sorin (Russian: Павел Михайлович Сорин, born 12 March 1995 in Pskov) is a Russian-born Uzbekistani rower. He won the gold medal in the quadruple sculls at the 2015 European Rowing Championships. He was removed from the squad for the 2020 Olympics after failing a drugs test.
