= Tone Wieten =

Dutch rower (born 1994)

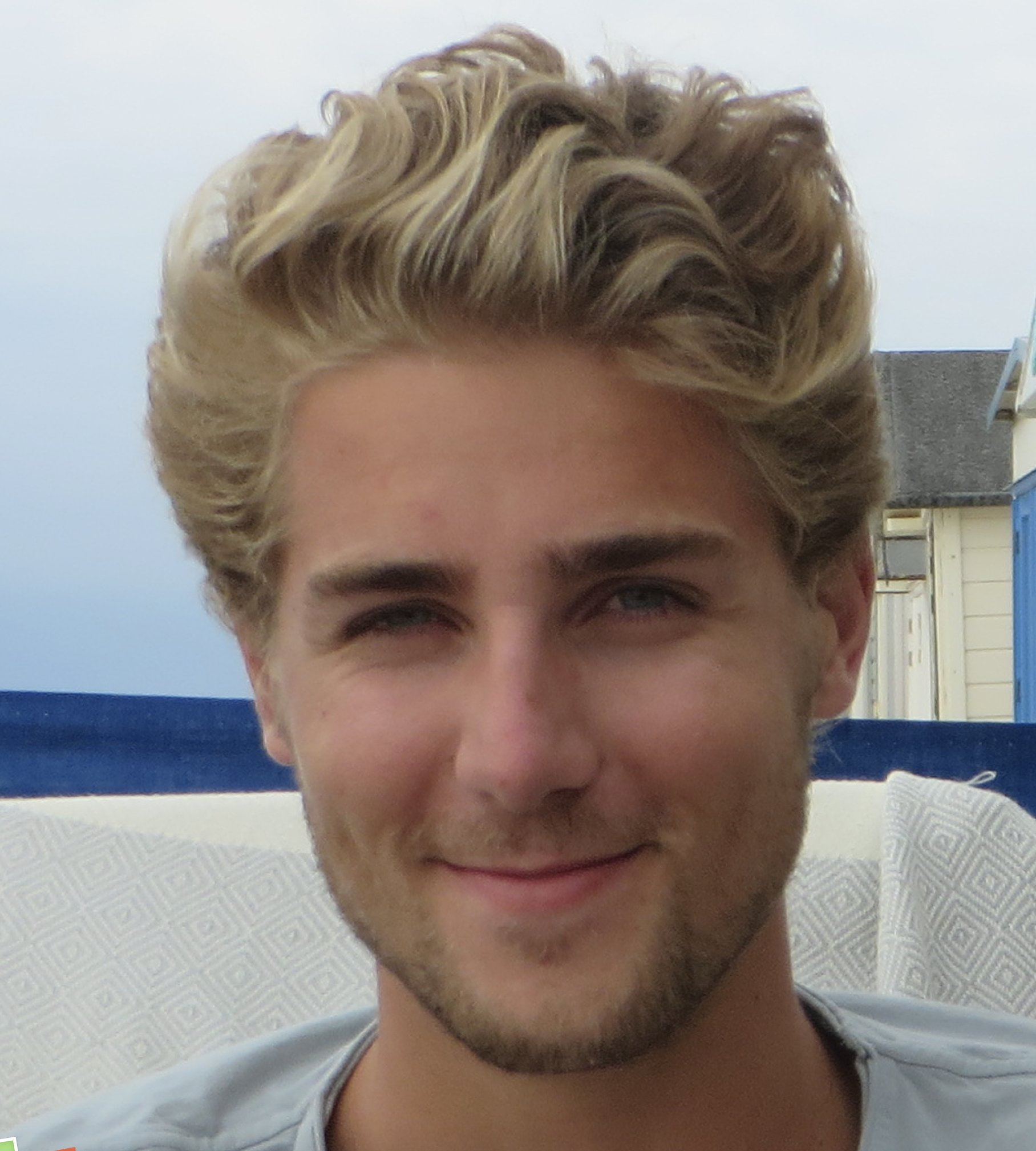

Personal information
- Nationality: Dutch
- Born: 17 March 1994 (age 32) Amsterdam, Netherlands
- Height: 2.02 m (6 ft 8 in)
- Weight: 98 kg (216 lb)

Sport
- Country: Netherlands
- Sport: Rowing
- Event(s): Quadruple sculls, Eight
Medal record
Men's rowing
Representing the Netherlands
Olympic Games
Gold medal – first place	2024 Paris	Quadruple sculls
Gold medal – first place	2020 Tokyo	Quadruple sculls
Bronze medal – third place	2016 Rio de Janeiro	Eight
World Championships
Gold medal – first place	2019 Ottensheim	Quadruple sculls
Gold medal – first place	2023 Belgrade	Quadruple sculls
Bronze medal – third place	2015 Aiguebelette	Eight
European Championships
Gold medal – first place	2020 Poznań	Quadruple sculls
Gold medal – first place	2019 Lucerne	Quadruple sculls
Silver medal – second place	2023 Bled	Quadruple sculls
Silver medal – second place	2021 Varese	Quadruple sculls
Bronze medal – third place	2017 Račice	Eight

Tone Wieten (born 17 March 1994) is a Dutch representative rower. He is a European champion, a dual Olympian and an Olympic and world champion. His world championship title was won in the men's quad scull at the 2019 World Rowing Championships. He won a bronze medal in the Dutch eight at the 2015 World Rowing Championships. At the 2016 Summer Olympics in Rio de Janeiro he was in the Dutch men's eight which won a bronze medal. In the Dutch men's quad scull at Tokyo 2020 he won an Olympic gold medal and set a new world's best time for that event.

== Club and other rowing ==
Wieten has raced for the Hollandia Roeiclub based in Utrecht. In 2016 he was in a Hollandia eight which won the Grand Challenge Cup at the Henley Royal Regatta.

== International representative rowing ==
Wieten's Dutch representative debut came in 2013 when he was selected in the Dutch U23 men's eight to contest the World Rowing U23 Championships in Linz-Ottensheim. He was again in the Dutch U23 men's eight for the 2014 U23 World Championships.

He earned a seat in the Dutch senior men's eight for the 2014 World Rowing Cup I when they rowed to a silver medal in Sydney, Australia. He kept his seat in the eight for the next three years racing at European Championships, World Rowing Cups during the international season and at the 2015 World Rowing Championships (third place), the 2016 Olympic Games (third place) and the 2017 World Rowing Championships (fourth place).

In 2018, Wieten was selected in the Dutch men's coxless four. They were competitive at all three World Rowing Cups and the European Championships and placed fourth at the 2018 World Rowing Championships.

In 2019, Wieten made the switch to sculling boats. The Dutch men's quad was a world class crew who had finished just off the podium at international regattas and the 2017 and 2018 World Championships. In 2019 with Wieten replacing Stefan Broenink in the three seat, the Dutch quad continued to improve their rankings, winning gold at the European Championships, taking third place at the World Rowing Cup III and then at the 2019 World Rowing Championships in Linz-Ottensheim taking the gold medal ahead of Poland and winning a World Championship title. The crew stayed together with limited international racing in 2020 when they again won the European Championships.

They commenced their 2021 campaign for the delayed Tokyo Olympics with a second placing at the 2021 European Championships and a gold medal at the World Rowing Cup II in May 2021.
