= Oleksandr Nadtoka =

Ukrainian rower (born 1991)

Olexandr Nadtoka
Personal information
- Nationality: Ukrainian
- Born: 6 March 1991 (age 35) Zaporizhia, Ukrainian SSR, Soviet Union
- Height: 1.96 m (6 ft 5 in)
- Weight: 93 kg (205 lb)

Sport
- Country: Ukraine
- Sport: Rowing
Medal record
Men's rowing
Representing Ukraine
World Championships
Gold medal – first place	2014 Amsterdam	Quadruple sculls
Bronze medal – third place	2018 Plovdiv	Quadruple sculls
European Championships
Gold medal – first place	2014 Belgrade	Quadruple sculls
Silver medal – second place	2012 Varese	Quadruple sculls
Silver medal – second place	2015 Poznań	Quadruple sculls
Universiade
Silver medal – second place	2013 Kazan	Double sculls
Silver medal – second place	2015 Gwangju	Eight

Oleksandr Oleksandrovich Nadtoka (Ukrainian: Олександр Олександрович Надтока; born 6 March 1991) is a Ukrainian rower. He won the gold medal in the quadruple sculls at the 2014 World Rowing Championships in Amsterdam.
