= Ivan Dovhodko =

Ukrainian rower (born 1989)

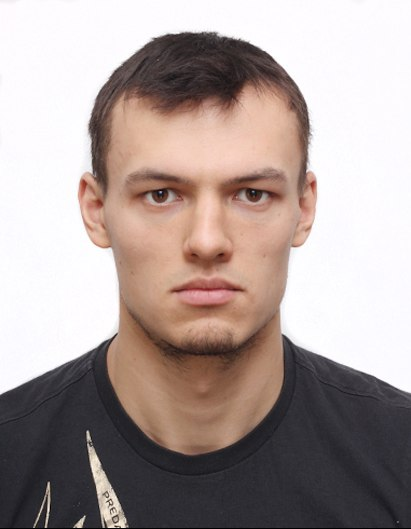

Personal information
- Nationality: Ukrainian
- Born: 15 January 1989 (age 37) Kiev, Ukrainian SSR, Soviet Union
- Height: 1.93 m (6 ft 4 in)
- Weight: 85 kg (187 lb)

Sport
- Country: Ukraine
- Sport: Rowing
- Event: M4x
Medal record
Men's rowing
Representing Ukraine
World Championships
Gold medal – first place	2014 Amsterdam	Quadruple sculls
Bronze medal – third place	2018 Plovdiv	Quadruple sculls
European Championships
Gold medal – first place	2014 Belgrade	Quadruple sculls
Silver medal – second place	2012 Varese	Quadruple sculls
Silver medal – second place	2015 Poznań	Quadruple sculls
Bronze medal – third place	2010 Montemor-o-Velho	Quadruple sculls
Universiade
Silver medal – second place	2013 Kazan	Double sculls
Silver medal – second place	2015 Gwangju	Eight

Ivan Viktorovych Dovhodko (Ukrainian: Іван Вікторович Довгодько; born 15 January 1989) is a Ukrainian rower. He competed in the quadruple sculls at the 2012 and 2016 Summer Olympics. He won the gold medal in the quadruple sculls at the 2014 World Rowing Championships in Amsterdam, setting a new world's best time. He has won a gold, two silvers and a bronze in the quadruple sculls at European level.

His sister Nataliya is also an Olympic rower. His father, Viktor Dovgodko, and his mother, Valentine Dovgodko, were also both international rowers.

He was originally coached by Raisa Kirilova at the "Burevisnyk" Kyiv club, before being coached by Maxim Mulyarchuk. While coached by Mulyarchuk, he was part of the Ukrainian team that won bronze in the quadruple sculls at the 2005 World Junior Championship. In 2008 when he aged out of junior rowing, he began being coached by Vladimir Opalnik. Under Opalnik, he was part of the Ukrainian team that won silver at the 2009 World U-23 Championship.

As part of the Ukrainian national team, he is coached by Nikolai Dovgan.
