= Nathan Flannery =

New Zealand rower

Personal information
- Born: 22 October 1992 (age 33)
- Height: 179 cm (5 ft 10 in)
- Weight: 76 kg (168 lb)

Nathan Flannery (born 22 October 1992) is a New Zealand rower who started with the sport in 2006. He qualified in 2016 to row in the New Zealand's men's quadruple scull. At the Olympic qualifying regatta in Lucerne, Switzerland, in May 2016—the last chance to qualify for the 2016 Olympics—they came third behind teams from Russia and Canada, and thus did not qualify. After a positive doping test returned by Russian crew member Sergey Fedorovtsev, the Russian team was disqualified by the world rowing federation and the New Zealand team was assigned an Olympic quota spot. For the competition in Rio, Flannery replaced Robbie Manson in the bow. The other two teammates are George Bridgewater and Jade Uru.
