= Martynas Džiaugys =

Lithuanian rower (born 1986)

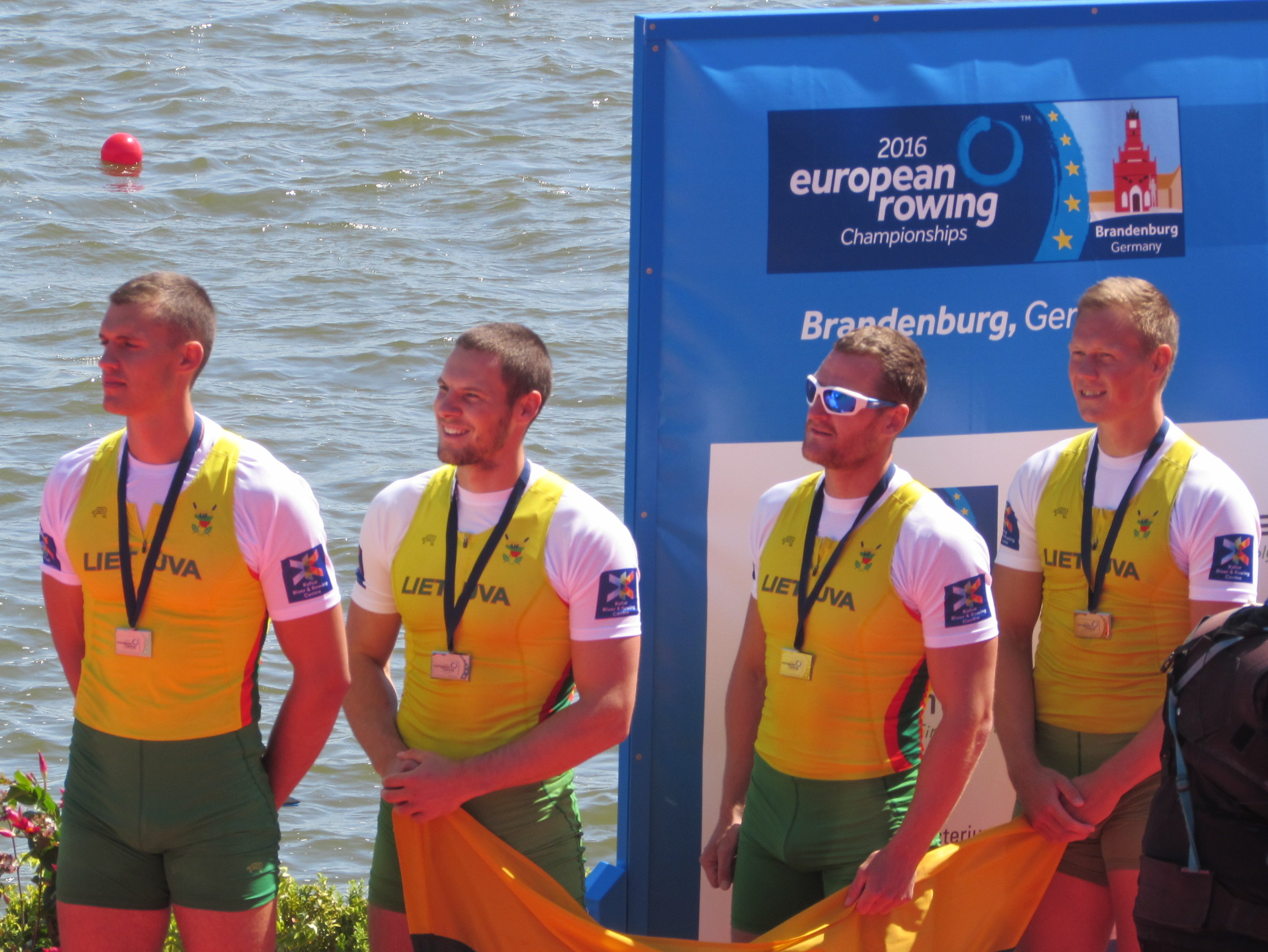

Personal information
- Born: 8 November 1986 (age 39)
Medal record
Men's rowing
Representing Lithuania
World Championships
Gold medal – first place	2017 Sarasota	Quadruple sculls
European Championships
Gold medal – first place	2017 Račice	Quadruple sculls
Silver medal – second place	2016 Brandenburg	Quadruple sculls
Bronze medal – third place	2020 Poznan	Quadruple sculls

Martynas Džiaugys (born 8 November 1986) is a Lithuanian rower.

In 2016 European championships he won silver with Lithuanian quadruple sculls team. He was also selected to the national team to represent Lithuania in 2016 Summer Olympics.
