= Hans Gruhne =

German rower (born 1988)

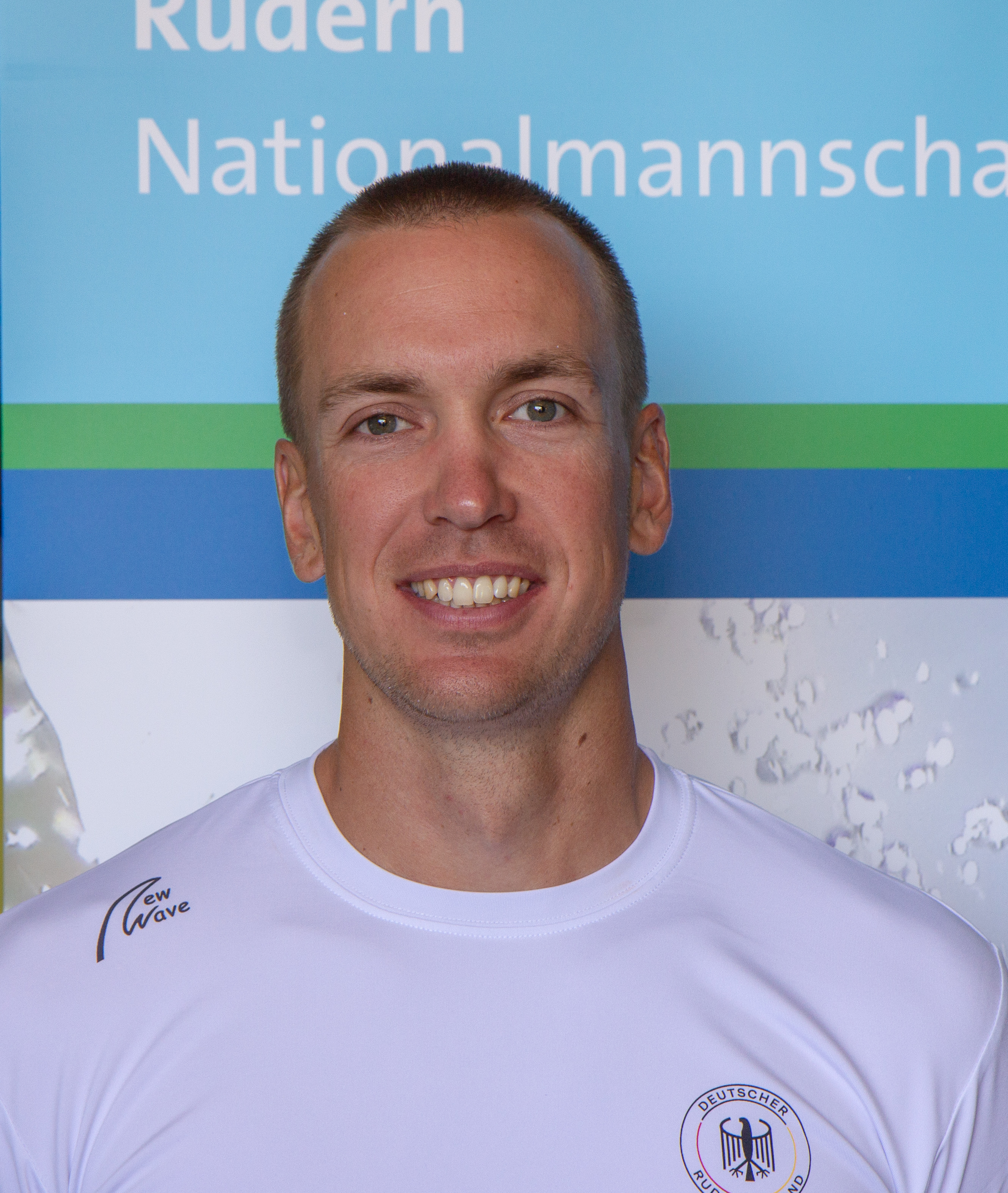
- Gruhne in 2018

Personal information
- Born: 5 August 1988 (age 37) Berlin, Germany
Medal record
Men's rowing
Representing Germany
Olympic Games
Gold medal – first place	2016 Rio de Janeiro	M4x
World Championships
Gold medal – first place	2015 Aiguebelette	M4x
Silver medal – second place	2011 Bled	M2x
Bronze medal – third place	2007 Munich	M4x
European Championships
Bronze medal – third place	2014 Belgrade	M2x

Hans Gruhne (born 5 August 1988) is a German rower. He won gold as part of the German team in the men's quadruple sculls at the 2016 Rio Olympics. He finished 6th in the men's quadruple sculls at the 2008 Summer Olympics.
