= Aurimas Adomavičius =

Lithuanian rower (born 1993)

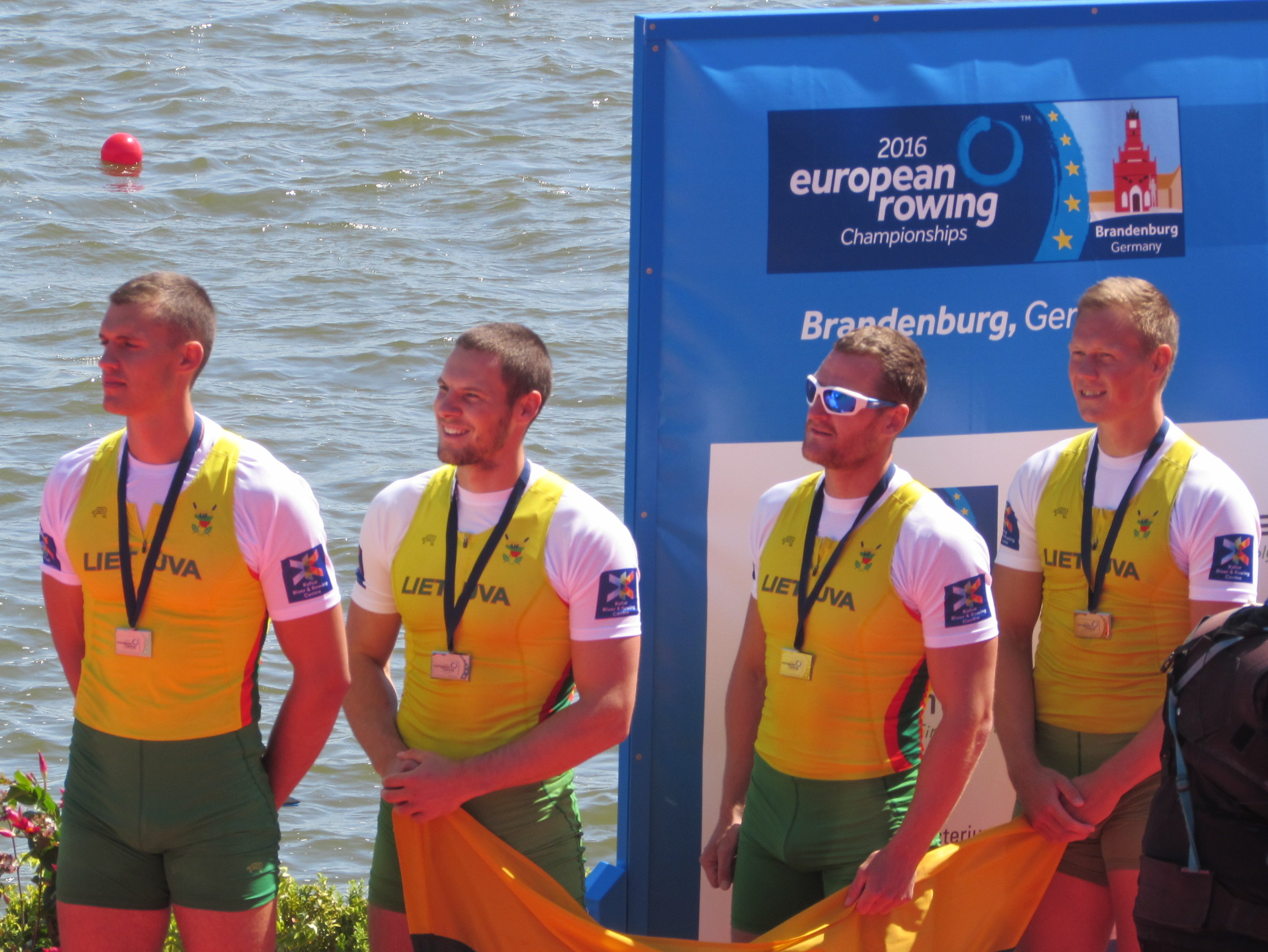

Personal information
- Born: 23 September 1993 (age 32) Kaunas, Lithuania
Medal record
Men's rowing
Representing Lithuania
World Championships
Gold medal – first place	2017 Sarasota	Quadruple sculls
European Championships
Gold medal – first place	2017 Račice	Quadruple sculls
Silver medal – second place	2016 Brandenburg	Quadruple sculls
Silver medal – second place	2018 Glasgow	Quadruple sculls
Bronze medal – third place	2020 Poznan	Quadruple sculls

Aurimas Adomavičius (born 23 September 1993) is a Lithuanian rower.

At the 2016 European Championships, he won silver with the Lithuanian quadruple sculls team. He was also selected to the national team to represent Lithuania in the 2016 Summer Olympics.

In April 2023 Adomavičius announced about retirement from professional sport.
