= Serhiy Hryn (rower) =

Ukrainian rower (born 1981)

Personal information
- Nationality: Ukrainian
- Born: 27 December 1981 (age 44) Kyiv, Ukrainian SSR, Soviet Union
- Height: 1.94 m (6 ft 4 in)
- Weight: 93 kg (205 lb)

Sport
- Country: Ukraine
- Sport: Rowing
Medal record
Men's rowing
Representing Ukraine
Olympic Games
Bronze medal – third place	2004 Athens	Quadruple sculls
World Championships
Silver medal – second place	2006 Eton	Quadruple sculls
Bronze medal – third place	2018 Plovdiv	Quadruple sculls
European Championships
Gold medal – first place	2009 Brest	Quadruple sculls
Bronze medal – third place	2008 Marathon	Quadruple sculls
Bronze medal – third place	2010 Montemor-o-Velho	Quadruple sculls
Bronze medal – third place	2015 Poznań	Double sculls

Serhiy Mikhailovich Hryn (Ukrainian: Гринь Сергій Михайлович; born 27 December 1981) is a Ukrainian rower.
