= Dominykas Jančionis =

Lithuanian rower (born 1993)

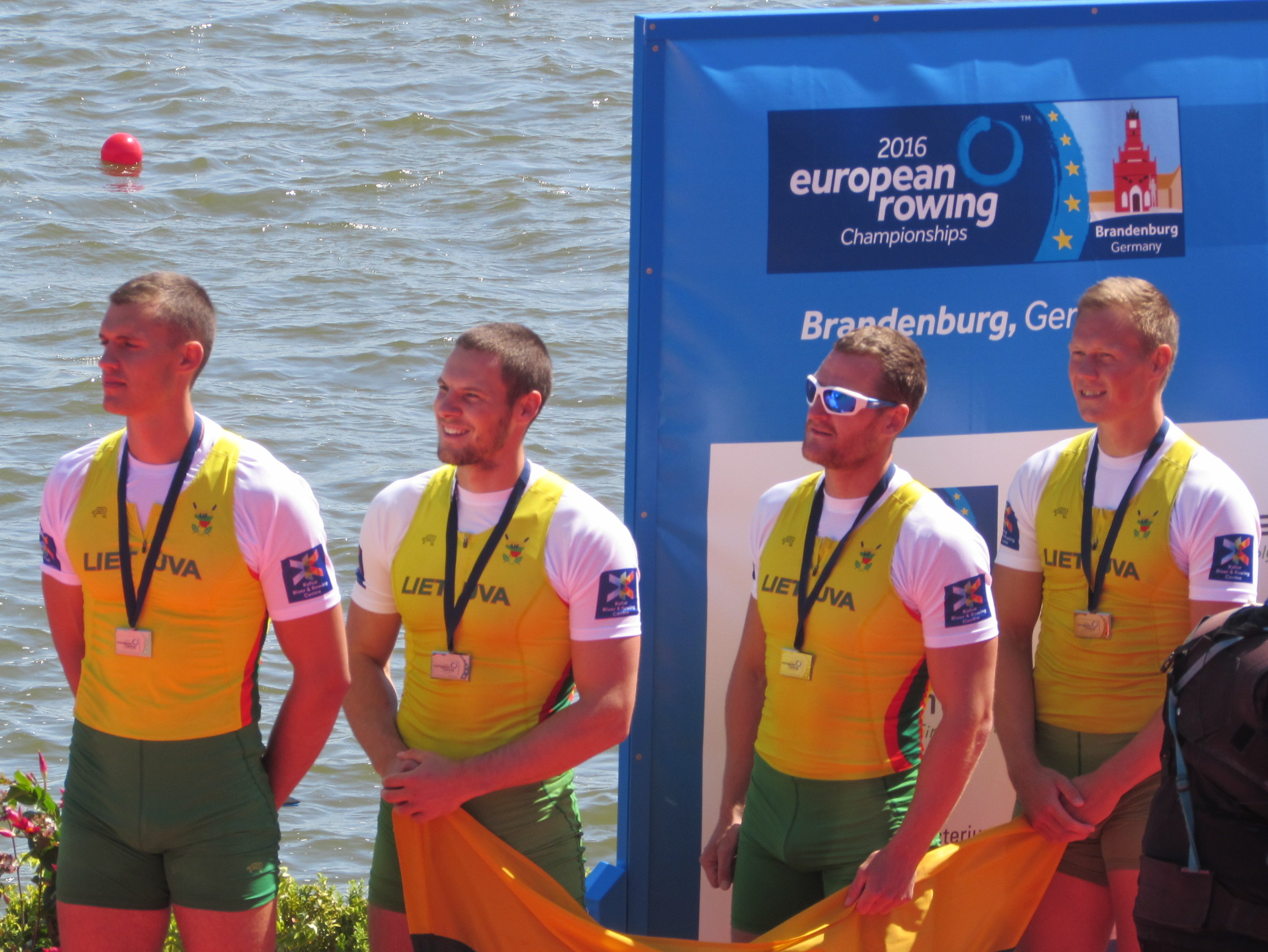

Personal information
- Born: 28 February 1993 (age 33)
Medal record
Men's rowing
Representing Lithuania
European Championships
Silver medal – second place	2016 Brandenbrug	M4x
Bronze medal – third place	2020 Poznan	Quadruple sculls

Dominykas Jančionis (born 28 February 1993) is a Lithuanian rower.

In 2016 European championships he won silver with Lithuanian quadruple sculls team. He was also selected to the national team to represent Lithuania in 2016 Summer Olympics.
