= 2023 World Rowing Championships – Men's quadruple sculls =

Men's quadruple sculls at the 2023 World Rowing Championships
- Venue: Lake Sava
- Location: Belgrade, Serbia
- Dates: 4 September – 9 September
- Competitors: 68 from 17 nations
- Winning time: 5:52.33

Medalists
gold medal	Lennart van Lierop; Finn Florijn; Tone Wieten; Koen Metsemakers	Netherlands
silver medal	Nicolò Carucci; Andrea Panizza; Luca Chiumento; Giacomo Gentili	Italy
bronze medal	Dominik Czaja; Fabian Barański; Mirosław Ziętarski; Mateusz Biskup	Poland

The men's quadruple sculls competition at the 2023 World Rowing Championships took place at Lake Sava, in Belgrade.

== Schedule ==
The schedule was as follows:

Date	Time	Round
Monday 4 September 2023	11:39	Heats
Tuesday 5 September 2023	12:36	Repechages
Thursday 7 September 2023	11:55	Semifinals A/B
Saturday 9 September 2023	10:40	Final C
Saturday 9 September 2023	12:20	Final B
Saturday 9 September 2023	15:26	Final A

All times are Central European Summer Time (UTC+2)

== Results ==
=== Heats ===
The fastest two boats in each heat advanced directly to the AB semifinals. The remaining boats were sent to the repechages.

==== Heat 1 ====
Rank	Rower	Country	Time	Notes
1	Dominik Czaja; Fabian Barański; Mirosław Ziętarski; Mateusz Biskup	Poland	6:00.17	SA/B
2	Dominic Condrau; Jan Jonah Plock; Scott Bärlocher; Maurin Lange	Switzerland	6:01.98	SA/B
3	Henry Youl; David Bartholot; Jack Cleary; Caleb Antill	Australia	6:03.83	R
4	Han Wei; Yi Xudi; Zang Ha; Sulitan Adilijiang	China	6:11.21	R
5	Daniel de Groot; Steven Rosts; Terek Been; Liam Smit	Canada	6:13.44	R
6	Daniel Nosek; Jan Potůček; Dalibor Neděla; Filip Zima	Czech Republic	6:20.69	R

==== Heat 2 ====
Rank	Rower	Country	Time	Notes
1	Lennart van Lierop; Finn Florijn; Tone Wieten; Koen Metsemakers	Netherlands	5:59.78	SA/B
2	Mykola Kalashnyk; Dmytro Hula; Oleksandr Nadtoka; Ivan Dovhodko	Ukraine	6:04.57	SA/B
3	Mikhail Kushteyn; Allar Raja; Tõnu Endrekson; Johann Poolak	Estonia	6:07.62	R
4	Kevin Cardno; Liam Galloway; William Legenzowski; Dominique Williams	United States	6:08.73	R
5	Mihai Chiruta; Andrei-Sebastian Cornea; Ioan Prundeanu; Marian Enache	Romania	6:09.64	R
6	Konan Pazzaia; Ronan Byrne; Andrew Sheehan; Brian Colsh	Ireland	6:17.50	R

==== Heat 3 ====
Rank	Rower	Country	Time	Notes
1	Nicolò Carucci; Andrea Panizza; Luca Chiumento; Giacomo Gentili	Italy	6:01.12	SA/B
2	Callum Dixon; George Bourne; Matt Haywood; Tom Barras	Great Britain	6:03.18	SA/B
3	Erling Øyasæter; Martin Helseth; Jonas Juel; Erik André Solbakken	Norway	6:06.08	R
4	Anton Finger; Max Appel; Tim Ole Naske; Moritz Wolf	Germany	6:09.80	R
5	Armandas Kelmelis; Povilas Juškevičius; Dominykas Jančionis; Giedrius Bieliauskas	Lithuania	6:17.37	R

=== Repechages ===
The three fastest boats in each repechage advanced to the AB semifinals. The remaining boats were sent to the C final.

==== Repechage 1 ====
Rank	Rower	Country	Time	Notes
1	Henry Youl; David Bartholot; Jack Cleary; Caleb Antill	Australia	5:49.76	SA/B
2	Erling Øyasæter; Martin Helseth; Jonas Juel; Erik André Solbakken	Norway	5:51.48	SA/B
3	Kevin Cardno; Liam Galloway; William Legenzowski; Dominique Williams	United States	5:51.49	SA/B
4	Konan Pazzaia; Ronan Byrne; Andrew Sheehan; Brian Colsh	Ireland	5:53.03	FC
5	Armandas Kelmelis; Povilas Juškevičius; Dominykas Jančionis; Giedrius Bieliauskas	Lithuania	5:56.92	FC
6	Daniel Nosek; Jan Potůček; Dalibor Neděla; Filip Zima	Czech Republic	6:01.15	FC

==== Repechage 2 ====
Rank	Rower	Country	Time	Notes
1	Anton Finger; Max Appel; Tim Ole Naske; Moritz Wolf	Germany	5:49.77	SA/B
2	Mihai Chiruta; Andrei-Sebastian Cornea; Ioan Prundeanu; Marian Enache	Romania	5:49.89	SA/B
3	Mikhail Kushteyn; Allar Raja; Tõnu Endrekson; Johann Poolak	Estonia	5:52.06	SA/B
4	Daniel de Groot; Steven Rosts; Terek Been; Liam Smit	Canada	5:56.04	FC
5	Han Wei; Yi Xudi; Zang Ha; Sulitan Adilijiang	China	5:57.99	FC

=== Semifinals A/B ===
The three fastest boats in each Semifinal advanced to the A final. The remaining boats were sent to the B final.

==== Semifinal 1 ====
Rank	Rower	Country	Time	Notes
1	Dominik Czaja; Fabian Barański; Mirosław Ziętarski; Mateusz Biskup	Poland	6:16.01	FA
2	Nicolò Carucci; Andrea Panizza; Luca Chiumento; Giacomo Gentili	Italy	6:17.13	FA
3	Anton Finger; Max Appel; Tim Ole Naske; Moritz Wolf	Germany	6:17.56	FA
4	Mykola Kalashnyk; Dmytro Hula; Oleksandr Nadtoka; Ivan Dovhodko	Ukraine	6:18.19	FB
5	Erling Øyasæter; Martin Helseth; Jonas Juel; Erik André Solbakken	Norway	6:27.96	FB
6	Kevin Cardno; Liam Galloway; William Legenzowski; Dominique Williams	United States	6:33.11	FB

==== Semifinal 2 ====
Rank	Rower	Country	Time	Notes
3	Dominic Condrau; Jan Jonah Plock; Scott Bärlocher; Maurin Lange	Switzerland	6:14.47	FA
1	Lennart van Lierop; Finn Florijn; Tone Wieten; Koen Metsemakers	Netherlands	6:06.20	FA
2	Callum Dixon; George Bourne; Matt Haywood; Tom Barras	Great Britain	6:12.64	FA
4	Mihai Chiruta; Andrei-Sebastian Cornea; Ioan Prundeanu; Marian Enache	Romania	6:16.32	FB
5	Mikhail Kushteyn; Allar Raja; Tõnu Endrekson; Johann Poolak	Estonia	6:18.49	FB
6	Henry Youl; David Bartholot; Jack Cleary; Caleb Antill	Australia	6:19.35	FB

=== Finals ===
The A final determined the rankings for places 1 to 6. Additional rankings were determined in the other finals.

==== Final C ====
Rank	Rower	Country	Time	Total rank
1	Konan Pazzaia; Ronan Byrne; Andrew Sheehan; Brian Colsh	Ireland	5:51.61	13
2	Han Wei; Yi Xudi; Zang Ha; Sulitan Adilijiang	China	5:52.91	14
3	Armandas Kelmelis; Povilas Juškevičius; Dominykas Jančionis; Giedrius Bieliauskas	Lithuania	5:55.42	15
4	Dalibor Neděla; Jan Potůček; Marek Diblík; Filip Zima	Czech Republic	5:55.81	16
5	Daniel de Groot; Steven Rosts; Terek Been; Liam Smit	Canada	5:56.49	17

==== Final B ====
Rank	Rower	Country	Time	Total rank
1	Mihai Chiruta; Andrei-Sebastian Cornea; Ioan Prundeanu; Marian Enache	Romania	5:49.89	7
2	Mikhail Kushteyn; Allar Raja; Tõnu Endrekson; Johann Poolak	Estonia	5:53.44	8
3	Kevin Cardno; Liam Galloway; William Legenzowski; Dominique Williams	United States	5:54.78	9
4	Erling Øyasæter; Martin Helseth; Jonas Juel; Erik André Solbakken	Norway	5:54.87	10
5	Henry Youl; David Bartholot; Jack Cleary; Caleb Antill	Australia	5:54.87	11
6	Mykola Kalashnyk; Dmytro Hula; Oleksandr Nadtoka; Ivan Dovhodko	Ukraine	5:58.49	12

==== Final A ====
Rank	Rower	Country	Time
1st place, gold medalist(s)	Lennart van Lierop; Finn Florijn; Tone Wieten; Koen Metsemakers	Netherlands	5:52.33
2nd place, silver medalist(s)	Nicolò Carucci; Andrea Panizza; Luca Chiumento; Giacomo Gentili	Italy	5:54.58
3rd place, bronze medalist(s)	Dominik Czaja; Fabian Barański; Mirosław Ziętarski; Mateusz Biskup	Poland	5:55.02
4	Callum Dixon; George Bourne; Matt Haywood; Tom Barras	Great Britain	5:55.75
5	Dominic Condrau; Jan Jonah Plock; Scott Bärlocher; Maurin Lange	Switzerland	6:02.31
6	Anton Finger; Max Appel; Tim Ole Naske; Moritz Wolf	Germany	6:03.85
