= Rowing at the 2024 Summer Olympics – Men's quadruple sculls =

Men's quadruple sculls at the Games of the XXXIII Olympiad
- Venue: Stade nautique de Vaires-sur-Marne, National Olympic Nautical Stadium of Île-de-France, Vaires-sur-Marne
- Dates: 27–31 July 2024
- Competitors: 9 from 9 nations

Medalists
1st place, gold medalist(s)		Lennart van Lierop; Finn Florijn; Tone Wieten; Koen Metsemakers	Netherlands
2nd place, silver medalist(s)		Luca Chiumento; Luca Rambaldi; Giacomo Gentili; Andrea Panizza	Italy
3rd place, bronze medalist(s)		Fabian Barański; Mateusz Biskup; Dominik Czaja; Mirosław Ziętarski	Poland

The men's quadruple sculls event at the 2024 Summer Olympics took place from 27 to 31 July 2024 at the Stade nautique de Vaires-sur-Marne, National Olympic Nautical Stadium of Île-de-France, Vaires-sur-Marne.

== Background ==
This was the 13th appearance of the event, which was first held at the 1976 Olympics.

== Qualification ==
Each National Olympic Committee (NOC) was limited to a single boat (one rower) in the event since 1912.

== Competition format ==
This rowing event is a quadruple scull event, meaning that each boat is propelled by four rowers. The "scull" portion means that the rower uses two oars, one on each side of the boat; this contrasts with sweep rowing in which each rower has one oar and rows on only one side. The competition consists of two rounds. Finals are held to determine the placing of each boat. The course used the 2000 metres distance that became the Olympic standard in 1912.

During the first round two heats were held. The first two boats in each heat advanced to final A, while all others were relegated to the repechages.

The repechage offered rowers a second chance to qualify for Final A. The top two boats in the repechage moved on to Final A, with the remaining boats sent to Final B.

There are two finals. Final A determined the medalists and the places through 6th. Final B determined places seven through nine.

== Schedule ==
The competition was held over six days.

All times are Central European Summer Time (UTC+2)

Date	Time	Round
Saturday, 27 July 2024	12:30	Heats
Monday, 29 July 2024	11:20	Repechage
Wednesday, 31 July 2024	12:02	Final B
Wednesday, 31 July 2024	12:26	Final A

== Results ==
=== Heats ===
The first three of each heat qualified for the final, while the remainder went to the repechage.

==== Heat 1 ====
Rank	Lane	Rower	Nation	Time	Notes
1	5	Lennart van Lierop; Finn Florijn; Tone Wieten; Koen Metsemakers	Netherlands	5:41.69	Q
2	2	Thomas Barras; Callum Dixon; Matthew Haywood; Graeme Thomas	Great Britain	5:44.82	Q
3	3	Anton Finger; Max Appel; Tim Ole Naske; Moritz Wolff	Germany	5:46.90	R
4	1	Kristoffer Brun; Oscar Stabe Helvig; Jonas Slettemark Juel; Erik André Solbakken	Norway	5:50.48	R
5	4	Leontin Nutescu; Andrei Lungu; Florin Bogdan Horodisteanu; Ioan Prundeanu	Romania	5:51.14	R

==== Heat 2 ====
Rank	Lane	Rower	Nation	Time	Notes
1	2	Luca Chiumento; Luca Rambaldi; Giacomo Gentili; Andrea Panizza	Italy	5:43.31	Q
2	4	Fabian Barański; Mateusz Biskup; Dominik Czaja; Mirosław Ziętarski	Poland	5:44.39	Q
3	3	Dominic Condrau; Jan Jonah Plock; Scott Bärlocher; Maurin Lange	Switzerland	5:49.50	R
4	1	Tõnu Endrekson; Mikhail Kushteyn; Johann Poolak; Allar Raja	Estonia	5:52.04	R

=== Repechage ===
The first two qualified for the final, while the remainder went to the B final and were out of medal contention.

Rank	Lane	Rower	Nation	Time	Notes
1	2	Anton Finger; Max Appel; Tim Ole Naske; Moritz Wolff	Germany	5:52.39	FA
2	3	Dominic Condrau; Jan Jonah Plock; Scott Bärlocher; Maurin Lange	Switzerland	5:52.55	FA
3	4	Kristoffer Brun; Oscar Stabe Helvig; Jonas Slettemark Juel; Erik André Solbakken	Norway	5:53.13	FB
4	1	Tõnu Endrekson; Mikhail Kushteyn; Johann Poolak; Allar Raja	Estonia	5:55.74	FB
5	5	Iliuță-Leontin Nuțescu; Andrei Lungu; Florin Bogdan Horodisteanu; Ioan Prundeanu	Romania	5:56.32	FB

=== Finals ===
==== Final B ====
Rank	Lane	Rower	Nation	Time	Notes
7	3	Tõnu Endrekson; Mikhail Kushteyn; Johann Poolak; Allar Raja	Estonia	5:50.55	
8	2	Kristoffer Brun; Oscar Stabe Helvig; Jonas Slettemark Juel; Erik André Solbakken	Norway	5:51.88	
9	1	Iliuță-Leontin Nuțescu; Andrei Lungu; Florin Bogdan Horodisteanu; Ioan Prundeanu	Romania	5:54.77	

==== Final A ====
Rank	Lane	Rower	Nation	Time	Notes
1st place, gold medalist(s)	4	Lennart van Lierop; Finn Florijn; Tone Wieten; Koen Metsemakers	Netherlands	5:42.00	
2nd place, silver medalist(s)	3	Luca Chiumento; Luca Rambaldi; Giacomo Gentili; Andrea Panizza	Italy	5:44.40	
3rd place, bronze medalist(s)	5	Fabian Barański; Mateusz Biskup; Dominik Czaja; Mirosław Ziętarski	Poland	5:44.59	
4	2	Tom Barras; Callum Dixon; Matt Haywood; Graeme Thomas	Great Britain	5:46.51	
5	6	Anton Finger; Max Appel; Tim Ole Naske; Moritz Wolff	Germany	5:50.62	
6	1	Dominic Condrau; Jan Jonah Plock; Scott Bärlocher; Maurin Lange	Switzerland	5:58.04	
