= Tobias Schröder =

British rower (born 1999)

Personal information
- Born: 25 May 1999 (age 27)
- Education: Exeter College, Oxford

Sport
- Sport: Rowing
Medal record
Men's rowing
Representing Great Britain
World Championships
Bronze medal – third place	2026 Amsterdam	Quadruple sculls
U23 World Championships
Gold medal – first place	2021 Račice	Eight

Tobias Schröder (born 25 May 1999) is a British rower. He was a medalist at the 2026 World Rowing Championships and a winner at The Boat Race 2022.

== Career ==
Schroder was a member of swimming club Nottingham Leander prior to taking up rowing. Having previously taken part in 2019, he rode stroke as part of the winning Oxford crew at the 2022 Boat Race.

Having won the gold medal in the men’s eight at the 2021 World Rowing U23 Championships, he joined the Team GB senior sculling squad in 2023, he competed in the double sculls and won the British Rowing Indoor Championships title in 2026 with 5:47 for 2k. In August, he won the bronze medal representing Great Britain at the 2026 World Rowing Championships in Amsterdam in the men's quadruple sculls, having transitioned into the team alongside Callum Dixon as well as Cedol Dafydd and Rory Harris. The boat also won the third and final World Rowing Cup regatta of the 2026 season in Lucerne.
