= 2022 World Rowing Championships – Men's quadruple sculls =

Men's quadruple sculls at the 2022 World Rowing Championships
- Venue: Labe aréna
- Location: Račice, Czech Republic
- Dates: 19 September – 24 September
- Competitors: 68 from 17 nations
- Winning time: 5:40.08

Medalists
gold medal	Dominik Czaja; Mateusz Biskup; Mirosław Ziętarski; Fabian Barański	Poland
silver medal	Harry Leask; George Bourne; Matthew Haywood; Tom Barras	Great Britain
bronze medal	Nicolò Carucci; Andrea Panizza; Luca Chiumento; Giacomo Gentili	Italy

The men's quadruple sculls competition at the 2022 World Rowing Championships took place at the Račice regatta venue.

== Schedule ==
The schedule was as follows:

Date	Time	Round
Monday 19 September 2022	12:41	Heats
Tuesday 20 September 2022	12:05	Repechages
Thursday 22 September 2022	12:45	Semifinals A/B
Saturday 24 September 2022	11:12	Final C
Saturday 24 September 2022	12:44	Final B
Saturday 24 September 2022	15:26	Final A

All times are Central European Summer Time (UTC+2)

== Results ==
=== Heats ===
The four fastest boats in each heat advanced directly to the AB semifinals. The remaining boats were sent to the repechages.

==== Heat 1 ====
Rank	Rower	Country	Time	Notes
1	Nicolò Carucci; Andrea Panizza; Luca Chiumento; Giacomo Gentili	Italy	5:43.94	SA/B
2	Jan van der Bij; Simon van Dorp; Stef Broenink; Finn Florijn	Netherlands	5:45.19	SA/B
3	Zygimantas Galisanskis; Dominykas Jančionis; Giedrius Bieliauskas; Aurimas Adomavičius	Lithuania	5:45.60	R
4	Mikhail Kushteyn; Allar Raja; Tõnu Endrekson; Johann Poolak	Estonia	5:52.93	R
5	James Plihal; Jonathan Kirkegaard; Kevin Cardno; Dominique Williams	United States	5:56.61	R
6	Ihram Ihram; Sulpianto Sulpianto; Rendi Setia Maulana; Memo Memo	Indonesia	6:14.94	R

==== Heat 2 ====
Rank	Rower	Country	Time	Notes
1	Harry Leask; George Bourne; Matthew Haywood; Tom Barras	Great Britain	5:41.91	SA/B
2	Mihai Chiruta; Ciprian Tudosă; Ioan Prundeanu; Marian Enache	Romania	5:42.94	SA/B
3	Jonas Juel; Mathias Føyner Wie; Martin Helseth; Erik Andre Solbakken	Norway	5:49.44	R
4	Valentin Onfroy; Benoit Brunet; Victor Marcelot; Théophile Onfroy	France	5:51.65	R
5	Phillip Wilson; Jamie Hindle-Daniels; Stephen Jones; Jack O'Leary	New Zealand	5:52.60	R
6	Jan Fleissner; Tomas Sisma; Dalibor Nedela; Filip Zima	Czech Republic	6:04.93	R

==== Heat 3 ====
Rank	Rower	Country	Time	Notes
1	Dominik Czaja; Mateusz Biskup; Mirosław Ziętarski; Fabian Barański	Poland	5:43.00	SA/B
2	Mykola Kalashnyk; Pavlo Yurchenko; Olexandr Nadtoka; Ivan Dovgodko	Ukraine	5:45.56	SA/B
3	Dominic Condrau; Nils Schneider; Kai Schätzle; Patrick Brunner	Switzerland	5:49.72	R
4	Zang Ha; Yi Xudi; Liu Zhiyu; Sulitan Adilijiang	China	5:52.55	R
5	Ruben Claeys; Ward Lemmelijn; Gaston Mercier; Tim Brys	Belgium	5:54.11	R

=== Repechages ===
The three fastest boats in each heat advanced to the AB semifinals. The remaining boats were sent to the Final C.

==== Repechage 1 ====
Rank	Rower	Country	Time	Notes
1	Valentin Onfroy; Benoit Brunet; Victor Marcelot; Théophile Onfroy	France	5:46.44	SA/B
2	Dominic Condrau; Nils Schneider; Kai Schätzle; Patrick Brunner	Switzerland	5:46.50	SA/B
3	Zygimantas Galisanskis; Dominykas Jančionis; Giedrius Bieliauskas; Aurimas Adomavičius	Lithuania	5:49.41	SA/B
4	Ruben Claeys; Ward Lemmelijn; Gaston Mercier; Tim Brys	Belgium	5:49.73	FC
5	Jan Fleissner; Tomas Sisma; Dalibor Nedela; Filip Zima	Czech Republic	5:50.09	FC
6	Ihram Ihram; Sulpianto Sulpianto; Rendi Setia Maulana; Memo Memo	Indonesia	6:00.94	FC

==== Repechage 2 ====
Rank	Rower	Country	Time	Notes
1	Mikhail Kushteyn; Allar Raja; Tõnu Endrekson; Johann Poolak	Estonia	5:46.01	SA/B
2	Zang Ha; Yi Xudi; Liu Zhiyu; Sulitan Adilijiang	China	5:46.93	SA/B
3	Jonas Juel; Mathias Føyner Wie; Martin Helseth; Erik Andre Solbakken	Norway	5:47.34	SA/B
4	Phillip Wilson; Jamie Hindle-Daniels; Stephen Jones; Jack O'Leary	New Zealand	5:51.60	FC
5	James Plihal; Jonathan Kirkegaard; Kevin Cardno; Dominique Williams	United States	5:51.86	FC

=== Semifinals A/B ===
The three fastest boats advanced to the Final A. The remaining boats were sent to the Final B.

==== Semifinal 1 ====
Rank	Rower	Country	Time	Notes
1	Nicolò Carucci; Andrea Panizza; Luca Chiumento; Giacomo Gentili	Italy	5:53.52	FA
2	Harry Leask; George Bourne; Matthew Haywood; Tom Barras	Great Britain	5:53.93	FA
3	Mikhail Kushteyn; Allar Raja; Tõnu Endrekson; Johann Poolak	Estonia	5:56.00	FA
4	Mykola Kalashnyk; Pavlo Yurchenko; Olexandr Nadtoka; Ivan Dovgodko	Ukraine	5:56.81	FB
5	Jonas Juel; Mathias Føyner Wie; Martin Helseth; Erik Andre Solbakken	Norway	6:00.94	FB
6	Dominic Condrau; Nils Schneider; Kai Schätzle; Patrick Brunner	Switzerland	6:03.12	FB

==== Semifinal 2 ====
Rank	Rower	Country	Time	Notes
1	Dominik Czaja; Mateusz Biskup; Mirosław Ziętarski; Fabian Barański	Poland	5:48.18	FA
2	Mihai Chiruta; Ciprian Tudosă; Ioan Prundeanu; Marian Enache	Romania	5:49.85	FA
3	Jan van der Bij; Simon van Dorp; Stef Broenink; Finn Florijn	Netherlands	5:51.13	FA
4	Valentin Onfroy; Benoit Brunet; Victor Marcelot; Théophile Onfroy	France	5:59.40	FB
5	Zygimantas Galisanskis; Dominykas Jančionis; Giedrius Bieliauskas; Aurimas Adomavičius	Lithuania	6:02.46	FB
6	Zang Ha; Yi Xudi; Liu Zhiyu; Sulitan Adilijiang	China	6:08.24	FB

=== Finals ===
The A final determined the rankings for places 1 to 6. Additional rankings were determined in the other finals

==== Final C ====
Rank	Rower	Country	Time	Total rank
1	Ruben Claeys; Ward Lemmelijn; Gaston Mercier; Tim Brys	Belgium	5:51.74	13
2	James Plihal; Jonathan Kirkegaard; Kevin Cardno; Dominique Williams	United States	5:52.05	14
3	Jan Fleissner; Tomas Sisma; Dalibor Nedela; Filip Zima	Czech Republic	5:55.36	15
4	Phillip Wilson; Jamie Hindle-Daniels; Stephen Jones; Jack O'Leary	New Zealand	5:56.51	16
5	Ihram Ihram; Sulpianto Sulpianto; Rendi Setia Maulana; Memo Memo	Indonesia	5:58.63	17

==== Final B ====
Rank	Rower	Country	Time	Total rank
1	Mykola Kalashnyk; Pavlo Yurchenko; Olexandr Nadtoka; Ivan Dovgodko	Ukraine	5:47.85	7
2	Valentin Onfroy; Benoit Brunet; Victor Marcelot; Théophile Onfroy	France	5:49.43	8
3	Zygimantas Galisanskis; Dominykas Jančionis; Giedrius Bieliauskas; Aurimas Adomavičius	Lithuania	5:49.52	9
4	Jonas Juel; Mathias Føyner Wie; Martin Helseth; Erik Andre Solbakken	Norway	5:49.57	10
5	Dominic Condrau; Nils Schneider; Kai Schätzle; Patrick Brunner	Switzerland	5:52.35	11
6	Zang Ha; Yi Xudi; Liu Zhiyu; Sulitan Adilijiang	China	5:53.36	12

==== Final A ====
Rank	Rower	Country	Time	Notes
1st place, gold medalist(s)	Dominik Czaja; Mateusz Biskup; Mirosław Ziętarski; Fabian Barański	Poland	5:40.08	
2nd place, silver medalist(s)	Harry Leask; George Bourne; Matthew Haywood; Tom Barras	Great Britain	5:40.97	
3rd place, bronze medalist(s)	Nicolò Carucci; Andrea Panizza; Luca Chiumento; Giacomo Gentili	Italy	5:42.14	
4	Jan van der Bij; Simon van Dorp; Stef Broenink; Finn Florijn	Netherlands	5:43.14	
5	Mikhail Kushteyn; Allar Raja; Tõnu Endrekson; Johann Poolak	Estonia	5:45.52	
6	Mihai Chiruta; Ciprian Tudosă; Ioan Prundeanu; Marian Enache	Romania	5:46.08	
