= 2026 World Rowing Championships – Men's quadruple sculls =

Men's quadruple sculls at the 2026 World Rowing Championships
- Venue: Bosbaan
- Location: Amsterdam, Netherlands
- Dates: 25–29 August
- Competitors: 76 from 19 nations
- Winning time: 5:33.60

Medalists
gold medal	Luca Chiumento; Andrea Panizza; Luca Rambaldi; Giacomo Gentili	Italy
silver medal	Marc Weber; Felix Heinrich; Jonas Gelsen; Ole Hohensee	Germany
bronze medal	Cedol Dafydd; Callum Dixon; Tobias Schroder; Rory Harris	Great Britain

The men's quadruple sculls competition at the 2026 World Rowing Championships took place at Bosbaan, in Amsterdam.

== Schedule ==
The schedule was as follows:

Date	Time	Round
Tuesday, 25 August 2026	15:25	Heats
Thursday, 27 August 2026	15:38	Final C
Thursday, 27 August 2026	16:57	Semifinals
Saturday, 29 August 2026	12:00	Final B
Saturday, 29 August 2026	13:21	Final A

All times are Central European Summer Time (UTC+2)

== Results ==
=== Heats ===
The two fastest boats in each heat and the six fastest times advanced to the semifinals. Other crews to Final C and remaining crew eliminated.

==== Heat 1 ====
Rank	Rower	Country	Time	Notes
1	Luca Chiumento; Andrea Panizza; Luca Rambaldi; Giacomo Gentili	Italy	6:14.90	SF
2	Mu Xiaolong; Xue Hao; Nie Yide; Ou Zhiwei	China	6:17.30	SF
3	Mihăiță Țigănescu; Alexandru Gherasim; Florin Horodișteanu; Ioan Prundeanu	Romania	6:19.67	SF
4	Manel Balastegui; Igor Teixidor Buch; Gonzalo Garcia Ferrero; Jordi Jofre i Senciales	Spain	6:22.97	SF
5	Balraj Panwar; Jakar Khan; Satnam Singh; Salman Khan	India	6:35.26	FC

==== Heat 2 ====
Rank	Rower	Country	Time	Notes
1	Marc Weber; Felix Heinrich; Jonas Gelsen; Ole Hohensee	Germany	6:16.11	SF
2	Hamish Danks; Johnson Daubney; Jackson Free; Marcus Della Marta	Australia	6:19.14	SF
3	Dominik Czaja; Mateusz Biskup; Mirosław Ziętarski; Konrad Domański	Poland	6:20.01	SF
4	Matěj Smejkal; Jan Čížek; Martin Ježek; Michal Zindulka	Czech Republic	6:23.87	SF
5	Maksim Hrybouski; Fiodar Shorakh; Raman Shabatsko; Pavel Sinenka	Individual Neutral Athletes 1	6:25.04	FC

==== Heat 3 ====
Rank	Rower	Country	Time	Notes
1	James Wright; Jacob Plihal; Cedar Cunningham; Ben Davison	United States	6:23.20	SF
2	Mats van Sabben; Thijs Ruiken; Lucas Keijzer; Percijn Van Haeringen	Netherlands	6:23.97	SF
3	Maksim Zhevlachenko; Aleksandr Iakovlev; Nikita Eskin; Andrei Potapkin	Individual Neutral Athletes 2	6:24.48	FC
4	Yuriy Ivanov; Artem Verestiuk; Oleksandr Nadtoka; Ivan Dovhodko	Ukraine	6:29.24	FC
5	Ryan Spelman; Martin O'Grady; Andrew Sheehan; Konan Pazzaia	Ireland	6:44.42	

==== Heat 4 ====
Rank	Rower	Country	Time	Notes
1	Goran Mahmutović; Roko Bošković; Damir Martin; Ivan Talaja	Croatia	6:20.85	SF
2	Cedol Dafydd; Callum Dixon; Tobias Schroder; Rory Harris	Great Britain	6:22.31	SF
3	Uku Siim Timmusk; Nikita Zoglo; Johann Poolak; Mikhail Kushteyn	Estonia	6:24.34	FC
4	Raphaël Ahumada; Bojan Reuffurth; Donat Vonder Mühll; Maurin Lange	Switzerland	6:28.88	FC

=== Semifinals ===
The three fastest boats in each heat advance to the Final A. The remaining boats were sent to the Final B.

==== Semifinal 1 ====
Rank	Rower	Country	Time	Notes
1	Luca Chiumento; Andrea Panizza; Luca Rambaldi; Giacomo Gentili	Italy	5:45.85	FA
2	Mats van Sabben; Thijs Ruiken; Lucas Keijzer; Percijn Van Haeringen	Netherlands	5:46.42	FA
3	Dominik Czaja; Mateusz Biskup; Mirosław Ziętarski; Konrad Domański	Poland	5:46.76	FA
4	Goran Mahmutović; Roko Bošković; Damir Martin; Ivan Talaja	Croatia	5:47.57	FB
5	Hamish Danks; Johnson Daubney; Jackson Free; Marcus Della Marta	Australia	5:55.60	FB
6	Manel Balastegui; Igor Teixidor Buch; Gonzalo Garcia Ferrero; Jordi Jofre i Senciales	Spain	5:57.64	FB

==== Semifinal 2 ====
Rank	Rower	Country	Time	Notes
1	Cedol Dafydd; Callum Dixon; Tobias Schroder; Rory Harris	Great Britain	5:44.40	FA
2	Marc Weber; Felix Heinrich; Jonas Gelsen; Ole Hohensee	Germany	5:44.61	FA
3	James Wright; Jacob Plihal; Cedar Cunningham; Ben Davison	United States	5:45.62	FA
4	Mu Xiaolong; Xue Hao; Nie Yide; Ou Zhiwei	China	5:54.48	FB
5	Matěj Smejkal; Jan Čížek; Martin Ježek; Michal Zindulka	Czech Republic	5:55.23	FB
6	Mihăiță Țigănescu; Alexandru Gherasim; Florin Horodișteanu; Ioan Prundeanu	Romania	6:02.54	FB

=== Finals ===
The A final determined the rankings for places 1 to 6. Additional rankings were determined in the other finals.

==== Final C ====
Rank	Rower	Country	Time	Total rank
1	Maksim Zhevlachenko; Aleksandr Iakovlev; Nikita Eskin; Andrei Potapkin	Individual Neutral Athletes 2	5:57.24	13
2	Yuriy Ivanov; Artem Verestiuk; Oleksandr Nadtoka; Ivan Dovhodko	Ukraine	5:58.77	14
3	Uku Siim Timmusk; Nikita Zoglo; Johann Poolak; Mikhail Kushteyn	Estonia	6:00.24	15
4	Maksim Hrybouski; Fiodar Shorakh; Raman Shabatsko; Pavel Sinenka	Individual Neutral Athletes 1	6:01.23	16
5	Raphaël Ahumada; Bojan Reuffurth; Donat Vonder Mühll; Maurin Lange	Switzerland	6:01.45	17
6	Balraj Panwar; Jakar Khan; Satnam Singh; Salman Khan	India	6:10.15	18

==== Final B ====
Rank	Rower	Country	Time	Notes
1	Goran Mahmutović; Roko Bošković; Damir Martin; Ivan Talaja	Croatia	5:38.98	7
2	Hamish Danks; Johnson Daubney; Jackson Free; Marcus Della Marta	Australia	5:42.66	8
3	Mu Xiaolong; Xue Hao; Nie Yide; Ou Zhiwei	China	5:43.17	9
4	Matěj Smejkal; Jan Čížek; Martin Ježek; Michal Zindulka	Czech Republic	5:45.58	10
5	Manel Balastegui; Igor Teixidor Buch; Gonzalo Garcia Ferrero; Jordi Jofre i Senciales	Spain	5:47.04	11
6	Mihăiță Țigănescu; Alexandru Gherasim; Florin Horodișteanu; Ioan Prundeanu	Romania	5:54.32	12

==== Final A ====
Rank	Rower	Country	Time
1st place, gold medalist(s)	Luca Chiumento; Andrea Panizza; Luca Rambaldi; Giacomo Gentili	Italy	5:33.60
2nd place, silver medalist(s)	Marc Weber; Felix Heinrich; Jonas Gelsen; Ole Hohensee	Germany	5:34.46
3rd place, bronze medalist(s)	Cedol Dafydd; Callum Dixon; Tobias Schroder; Rory Harris	Great Britain	5:35.40
4	Mats van Sabben; Thijs Ruiken; Lucas Keijzer; Percijn Van Haeringen	Netherlands	5:39.22
5	Dominik Czaja; Mateusz Biskup; Mirosław Ziętarski; Konrad Domański	Poland	5:42.13
6	James Wright; Jacob Plihal; Cedar Cunningham; Ben Davison	United States	5:45.47
