= Gert-Jan van Doorn =

Dutch rower (born 1999)

Personal information
- Born: 3 February 1999 (age 27)

Sport
- Country: Netherlands
- Sport: Rowing

Achievements and titles
- Olympic finals: Paris 2024 M8+
Medal record
Men's rowing
Representing the Netherlands
Olympic Games
| Silver medal – second place | 2024 Paris | Eight |
World Championships
| Silver medal – second place | 2023 Belgrade | Eight |
| Silver medal – second place | 2026 Amsterdam | Coxless four |
| Silver medal – second place | 2026 Amsterdam | Mixed eight |
| Bronze medal – third place | 2025 Shanghai | Coxless four |
European Championships
| Silver medal – second place | 2025 Plovdiv | Quadruple sculls |
| Bronze medal – third place | 2023 Bled | Eight |

Gert-Jan van Doorn (born 3 February 1999) is a Dutch rower. He won a silver medal in the men's eight at the 2024 Summer Olympics in Paris.

== Early and personal life ==
He attended the University of Washington in Seattle, United States. He had to remain in Spokane, Washington during the COVID-19 pandemic.

== Career ==
In July 2022, with his University of Washington boat, he won the Visitors Challenge at the Henley Regatta.

He won a silver medal in the coxless four at the 2023 European Rowing Championships in Bled, Slovenia. He won a silver medal in the men's eight at the 2023 World Rowing Championships in Belgrade.

He won a silver medal in the men's eight at the 2024 Summer Olympics in Paris.

In Amsterdam in June 2026, he won a silver medal at the 2026 World Rowing Championships in the men's coxless four alongside Lennart van Lierop, Rik Rienks and Eli Brouwer.
