= Rory Harris =

British rower (born 1998)

Personal information
- Born: 9 August 1998 (age 28)

Sport
- Sport: Rowing
- Club: Leander Club
Medal record
Men's rowing
Representing Great Britain
World Championships
Silver medal – second place	2025 Shanghai	Quadruple sculls
Bronze medal – third place	2026 Amsterdam	Quadruple sculls
European Championships
Gold medal – first place	2025 Plovdiv	Quadruple sculls

Rory Harris (born 9 August 1998) is a British rower. Competing in the quadruple sculls, he won a gold medal at the 2025 European Championships and a silver medal at the 2025 World Championships.

== Career ==
Harris is from a family of rowers, but initially took part in cross country running before focusing on rowing in secondary school. He started rowing at Walton Rowing Club, later competing for Pangbourne, and Molesey and Leander Club. He studied at University of Reading, where he had success in British Universities and Colleges Sport (BUCS) rowing.

He won the gold medal at the 2025 European Rowing Championships in Plovdiv in the men's quadruple sculls as the team of Harris, Callum Dixon, Cedol Dafydd and Matt Haywood achieved a European best time of five minutes and 35 seconds. It was Great Britain's first ever European gold in the men’s quadruple sculls. He won the 2025 World Rowing Cup Series with the British men’s quad, placing third in Varese and winning the event in Lucerne.

He won the silver medal at the 2025 World Rowing Championships in Shanghai in the men's quadruple sculls with, Dixon, Dafydd and Haywood, as they finished runner-up to the boat from Italy.
