= James Robson (rower) =

British rower (born 1994)

Personal information
- Born: 6 August 1994 (age 32)

Sport
- Sport: Rowing
- Club: Leander Club
Medal record
Men's rowing
Representing Great Britain
World Championships
Gold medal – first place	2025 Shanghai	Coxless four
Bronze medal – third place	2026 Amsterdam	Coxless four

James Robson (born 6 August 1994) is a British rower. He was a gold medalist at the 2025 World Rowing Championships in the coxless four.

== Biography ==
From Suffolk, he started rowing at Oundle School in 2012, and later studied at Newcastle University and for an MBA at Peterhouse, Cambridge. A member of the Leander Club, he competes despite being diagnosed with atrial fibrillation in 2022, speaking in 2025, Robson said that he has "learned to deal with it…and it doesn't affect me at all". Robson was a reserve for the men's eight at the 2024 Olympic Games in Paris, France. Representing Peterhouse Boat Club, he was a member of the winning Cambridge boat at the 2025 Varsity Boat Race.

Robson was a gold medalist at the 2025 World Rowing Championships in the coxless four in Shanghai, in September 2025, alongside George Bourne, Dan Graham and Douwe de Graaf.
