= Douwe de Graaf =

British rower (born 2000)

Personal information
- Born: 23 May 2000 (age 26)

Sport
- Sport: Rowing
- Club: Leander Club
Medal record
Men's rowing
Representing Great Britain
World Championships
Gold medal – first place	2025 Shanghai	Coxless four
Bronze medal – third place	2026 Amsterdam	Coxless four

Douwe de Graaf (born 23 May 2000) is a British rower. He was a gold medalist at the 2025 World Rowing Championships in the coxless four.

== Biography ==
He started rowing in 2013 at St Paul's School, London, where his older brother was a member of the men’s eight. He attended Harvard University in the United States, and later studied for an MPhil in Finance and Economics at St Edmund's College, Cambridge.

He was a medalist at the World Junior Rowing Championships and was a gold medalist in the men’s pair, alongside Calvin Tarczy, at the 2021 World Rowing U23 Championships in the Czech Republic.

In 2024, he was a member of the Leander Club crew which set a new course record at the Head of the River Race on the River Thames. He won the Men’s pairs at the GB Trails alongside George Bourne in February 2025. Representing St Edmund's College Boat Club, he was a member of the winning Cambridge boat at the 2025 Varsity Boat Race. He was a gold medalist at the 2025 World Rowing Championships in the coxless four in Shanghai, in September 2025, alongside Bourne, Dan Graham and James Robson.
