= Cedol Dafydd =

British rower (born 2000)

Personal information
- Born: 4 October 2000 (age 25)
- Education: University of Bath

Sport
- Sport: Rowing
Medal record
Men's rowing
Representing Great Britain
World Championships
Silver medal – second place	2025 Shanghai	Quadruple sculls
Bronze medal – third place	2026 Amsterdam	Quadruple sculls
European Championships
Gold medal – first place	2025 Plovdiv	Quadruple sculls

Cedol Dafydd (born 4 October 2000) is a Welsh rower. Competing in the quadruple sculls, he won a gold medal for Great Britain at the 2025 European Championships and a silver medal at the 2025 World Championships.

== Biography ==
From Bangor, Gwynedd, Wales, he was a member of Swim Gwynedd performance club, played rugby union at Bangor RFC, and also competed in long-distance running prior to taking up rowing. Dafydd began his rowing career with the Bath, Somerset-based South West Performance Development Academy. He was educated at the University of Bath, graduating in Sports Management and Coaching.

He won the gold medal at the 2025 European Rowing Championships in Plovdiv in the men's quadruple sculls, as the team of Dafydd, Rory Harris, Callum Dixon, and Matt Haywood achieved a European best time of five minutes and 35 seconds. It was Great Britain's first ever European gold in the men’s quadruple sculls. He won the 2025 World Rowing Cup Series with the British men’s quad, placing third in Varese and winning the event in Lucerne.

He won the silver medal at the 2025 World Rowing Championships in Shanghai in the men's quadruple sculls with Harris, Dixon and Haywood.
