= Daniel Graham (rower) =

British rower (born 1999)

Personal information
- Born: 24 February 1999 (age 27)

Sport
- Sport: Rowing
- Club: Leander Club
Medal record
Men's rowing
Representing Great Britain
World Championships
Gold medal – first place	2025 Shanghai	Coxless four
Bronze medal – third place	2026 Amsterdam	Coxless four

Daniel Graham (born 24 February 1999) is a British rower. He was a gold medalist at the 2025 World Rowing Championships in the coxless four.

== Biography ==
Graham started rowing at Tyne United Rowing Club and later rowed at Newcastle University, where he studied ancient history. He later joined the Leander Club. He represented Great Britain at the 2021 World Rowing U23 Championships in the Czech Republic, but had to replace by Callum Sullivan after the heats of the men's four due to sickness.

Graham finished third with the GB development boat at the World Rowing Cup regatta in Poznań in 2024. That year, he was a member of the Leander Club crew which set a new course record at the Head of the River Race on The Thames.

Graham competed in the men’s four at the 2025 European Rowing Championships in May 2025. He was a gold medalist at the 2025 World Rowing Championships in the coxless four in Shanghai, in September 2025, alongside George Bourne, James Robson and Douwe de Graaf.
