= Rik Rienks =

Dutch rower (born 1995)

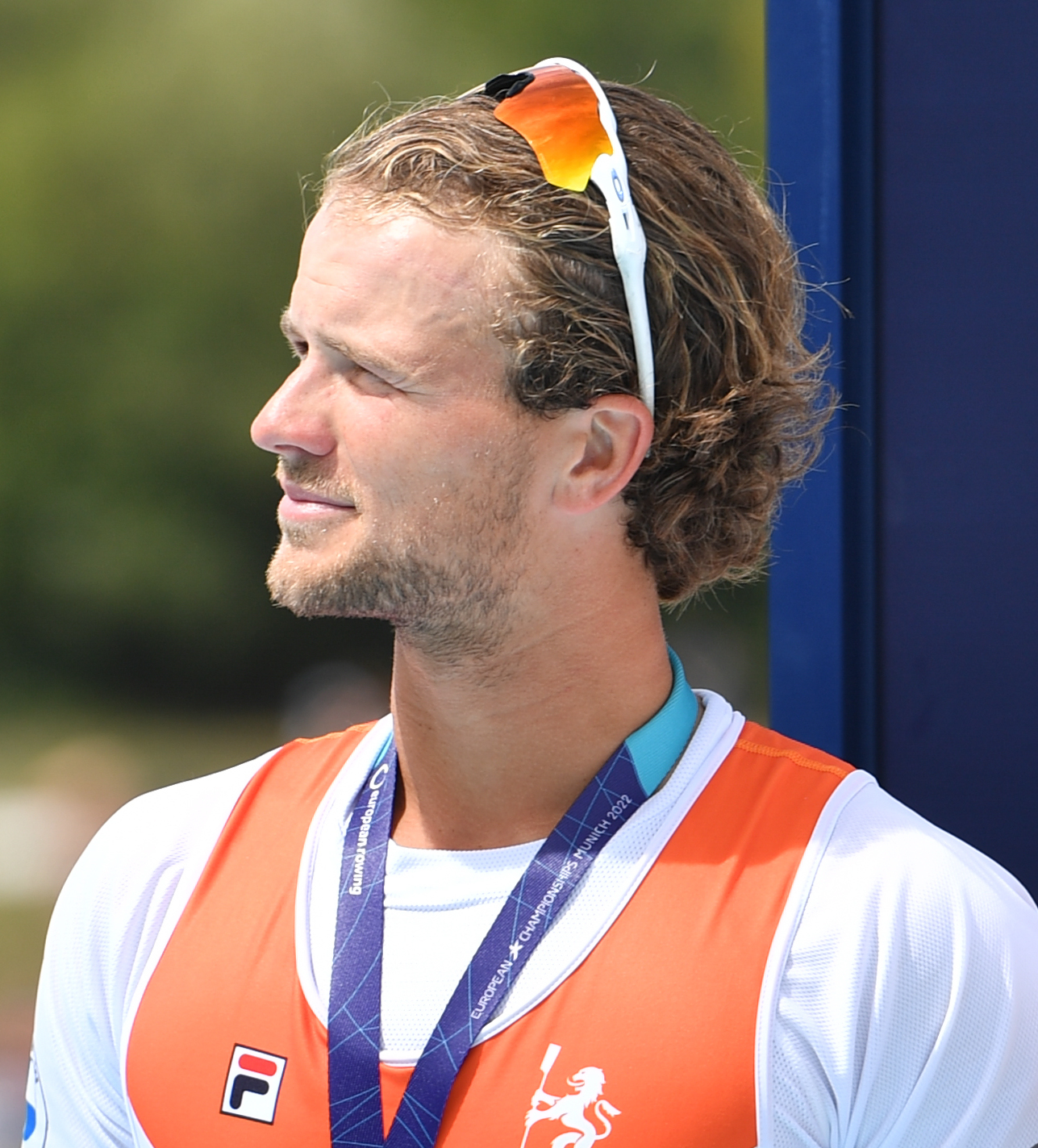
- Rienks in 2022

Personal information
- Born: 17 March 1995 (age 31)
- Parents: Nico Rienks, Harriet van Ettekoven
- Relative: Ralf Rienks (brother)

Sport
- Country: Netherlands
- Sport: Rowing
Medal record
Men's rowing
Representing the Netherlands
World Championships
| Silver medal – second place | 2026 Amsterdam | Coxless four |
| Silver medal – second place | 2026 Amsterdam | Mixed eight |
| Bronze medal – third place | 2022 Racice | Coxless four |
European Championships
| Silver medal – second place | 2022 Munich | Coxless four |
| Bronze medal – third place | 2023 Bled | Eight |

Rik Rienks (born 17 March 1995) is a Dutch rower. He was a medalist at the 2022 and 2026 World Rowing Championships, and competed at the 2024 Olympic Games.

== Biography ==
From from a rowing family, his His father Nico Rienks won gold at the 1988 and 1996 Olympic Games. His mother Harriet van Ettekoven won bronze at the 1984 Olympic Games.

His brother Ralf Rienks is also a rower, with the pair competing together for the national team in two World Championships in the four in the coxless four, before placing eighth together in the pair at the 2025 World Rowing Championships and Silver Goblets & Nickalls’ Challenge Cup at the 2025 Henley Regatta. The pair had been split-up for the 2024 Olympic Games with Rik competing in the coxless four with the Dutch team that finished seventh overall. Prior to that, they had won a silver medal in the coxless four at the 2022 European Rowing Championships in Munich and won a bronze medal at the 2022 World Rowing Championships in the men's coxless four in the Czech Republic, as well as a bronze medal in the men's eight at the 2023 European Rowing Championships in Bled, Slovenia.

In Amsterdam in June 2026, he won a silver medal at the 2026 World Rowing Championships in the men's coxless four alongside Lennart van Lierop, Gert-Jan van Doorn and Eli Brouwer.

== Personal life ==
He completed bachelor's and master's degrees at Vrije Universiteit in Amsterdam.
