= 2026 World Rowing Championships – Men's coxless four =

Men's coxless four at the 2026 World Rowing Championships
- Venue: Bosbaan
- Location: Amsterdam, Netherlands
- Dates: 25–29 August
- Competitors: 68 from 17 nations
- Winning time: 5:41.57

Medalists
gold medal	Gus Rodríguez; Peter Chatain; Chris Carlson; Pieter Quinton	United States
silver medal	Lennart van Lierop; Gert-Jan van Doorn; Eli Brouwer; Rik Rienks	Netherlands
bronze medal	Daniel Graham; James Robson; Douwe de Graaf; George Bourne	Great Britain

The men's coxless four competition at the 2026 World Rowing Championships took place at Bosbaan, in Amsterdam.

== Schedule ==
The schedule was as follows:

Date	Time	Round
Tuesday, 25 August 2026	14:53	Heats
Thursday, 27 August 2026	15:28	Final C
Thursday, 27 August 2026	16:35	Semifinals
Saturday, 29 August 2026	11:50	Final B
Saturday, 29 August 2026	12:46	Final A

All times are Central European Summer Time (UTC+2)

== Results ==
=== Heats ===
The two fastest boats in each heat and the six fastest times advanced to the semifinals. Other crews to Final C.

==== Heat 1 ====
Rank	Rower	Country	Time	Notes
1	Daniel Graham; James Robson; Douwe de Graaf; George Bourne	Great Britain	6:25.68	SF
2	Nikolas Pender; Ben Canham; Patrick Holt; Benjamin Scott	Australia	6:28.45	SF
3	Davide Comini; Salvatore Monfrecola; Emanuele Gaetani Liseo; Alessandro Gardino	Italy	6:31.19	SF
4	Mantas Juškevičius; Saulius Aušbikavičius; Povilas Stankūnas; Arnedas Kelmelis	Lithuania	6:32.43	SF
5	Maksym Semenov; Oleh Kravchenko; Maksym Boklazhenko; Oleksii Selivanov	Ukraine	6:33.17	SF
6	Fionnan Mc Quillan-Tolan; James Doran; Adam Murphy; Jack Dorney	Ireland	6:34.50	FC

==== Heat 2 ====
Rank	Rower	Country	Time	Notes
1	Gus Rodríguez; Peter Chatain; Chris Carlson; Pieter Quinton	United States	6:22.22	SF
2	Armand Pfister; Alistair Gicqueau; Florian Ludwig; Teo Rayet	France	6:25.62	SF
3	Fred Vavasour; Ollie Maclean; Harry Fitzpatrick; Matt Macdonald	New Zealand	6:25.64	SF
4	Li Chun; Li Zepeng; Shao Zhiqiang; Bian Shihao	China	6:33.10	SF
5	Aksel Poulsen; Magnus Valbirk; Christian Søndergaard; Nikolaj Kragh Simonsen	Denmark	6:40.61	FC
6	Eric Pastor; Pau Sánchez Batlle; Dennis Carracedo Ferrero; Jorge Knabe	Spain	6:41.51	FC

==== Heat 3 ====
Rank	Rower	Country	Time	Notes
1	Lennart van Lierop; Gert-Jan van Doorn; Eli Brouwer; Rik Rienks	Netherlands	6:24.10	SF
2	Jasper Angl; Mark Hinrichs; Benedict Eggeling; René Schmela	Germany	6:24.70	SF
3	Cosmin Iulian Plesescu; Leontin Nutescu; Andrei Vatamaniuc; Ciprian Tudosă	Romania	6:28.16	SF
4	Steven Rosts; Axel Eiger Ewashko; Ryan Clegg; Samuel Stewart	Canada	6:41.84	FC
5	Jaswinder Singh; Yogesh Kumar; Babu Lal Yadav; Nitin Kumar	India	7:01.36	FC

=== Semifinals ===
The three fastest boats in each heat advance to the Final A. The remaining boats were sent to the Final B.

==== Semifinal 1 ====
Rank	Rower	Country	Time	Notes
1	Gus Rodríguez; Peter Chatain; Chris Carlson; Pieter Quinton	United States	5:57.48	FA
2	Daniel Graham; James Robson; Douwe de Graaf; George Bourne	Great Britain	5:58.30	FA
3	Cosmin Iulian Plesescu; Leontin Nutescu; Andrei Vatamaniuc; Ciprian Tudosă	Romania	6:01.73	FA
4	Armand Pfister; Alistair Gicqueau; Florian Ludwig; Teo Rayet	France	6:09.59	FB
5	Mantas Juškevičius; Saulius Aušbikavičius; Povilas Stankūnas; Arnedas Kelmelis	Lithuania	6:14.69	FB
6	Maksym Semenov; Oleh Kravchenko; Maksym Boklazhenko; Oleksii Selivanov	Ukraine	6:16.21	FB

==== Semifinal 2 ====
Rank	Rower	Country	Time	Notes
1	Lennart van Lierop; Gert-Jan van Doorn; Eli Brouwer; Rik Rienks	Netherlands	5:58.70	FA
2	Jasper Angl; Mark Hinrichs; Benedict Eggeling; René Schmela	Germany	6:00.15	FA
3	Fred Vavasour; Ollie Maclean; Harry Fitzpatrick; Matt Macdonald	New Zealand	6:00.42	FA
4	Li Chun; Li Zepeng; Shao Zhiqiang; Bian Shihao	China	6:02.09	FB
5	Nikolas Pender; Ben Canham; Patrick Holt; Benjamin Scott	Australia	6:10.13	FB
6	Davide Comini; Salvatore Monfrecola; Emanuele Gaetani Liseo; Alessandro Gardino	Italy	6:13.48	FB

=== Finals ===
The A final determined the rankings for places 1 to 6. Additional rankings were determined in the other finals.

==== Final C ====
Rank	Rower	Country	Time	Total rank
1	Steven Rosts; Axel Eiger Ewashko; Ryan Clegg; Samuel Stewart	Canada	6:07.21	13
2	Fionnan Mc Quillan-Tolan; James Doran; Adam Murphy; Jack Dorney	Ireland	6:09.62	14
3	Aksel Poulsen; Magnus Valbirk; Christian Søndergaard; Nikolaj Kragh Simonsen	Denmark	6:13.14	15
4	Eric Pastor; Pau Sánchez Batlle; Dennis Carracedo Ferrero; Jorge Knabe	Spain	6:19.27	16
5	Jaswinder Singh; Yogesh Kumar; Babu Lal Yadav; Nitin Kumar	India	6:25.02	17

==== Final B ====
Rank	Rower	Country	Time	Total rank
1	Armand Pfister; Alistair Gicqueau; Florian Ludwig; Teo Rayet	France	5:52.11	7
2	Li Chun; Li Zepeng; Shao Zhiqiang; Bian Shihao	China	5:52.11	8
3	Davide Comini; Salvatore Monfrecola; Emanuele Gaetani Liseo; Alessandro Gardino	Italy	5:54.72	9
4	Nikolas Pender; Ben Canham; Patrick Holt; Benjamin Scott	Australia	5:54.87	10
5	Mantas Juškevičius; Saulius Aušbikavičius; Povilas Stankūnas; Domantas Stankūnas	Lithuania	5:59.29	11
6	Maksym Semenov; Oleh Kravchenko; Maksym Boklazhenko; Oleksii Selivanov	Ukraine	6:04.38	12

==== Final A ====
Rank	Rower	Country	Time
1st place, gold medalist(s)	Gus Rodríguez; Peter Chatain; Chris Carlson; Pieter Quinton	United States	5:41.57
2nd place, silver medalist(s)	Lennart van Lierop; Gert-Jan van Doorn; Eli Brouwer; Rik Rienks	Netherlands	5:41.84
3rd place, bronze medalist(s)	Daniel Graham; James Robson; Douwe de Graaf; George Bourne	Great Britain	5:44.16
4	Jasper Angl; Mark Hinrichs; Benedict Eggeling; René Schmela	Germany	5:49.64
5	Cosmin Iulian Plesescu; Leontin Nutescu; Andrei Vatamaniuc; Ciprian Tudosă	Romania	5:50.14
6	Fred Vavasour; Ollie Maclean; Harry Fitzpatrick; Matt Macdonald	New Zealand	5:59.88
