= Tom Barras (rower) =

British rower (born 1994)

Personal information
- Full name: Thomas Elliott Barras
- Nationality: British
- Born: 7 January 1994 (age 32) Staines
- Height: 191 cm (6 ft 3 in)
- Weight: 90 kg (198 lb)

Sport
- Country: Great Britain
- Sport: Rowing
- Events: Men's single sculls, Men’s quadruple sculls
Medal record
Men's rowing
Representing Great Britain
Olympic Games
Silver medal – second place	2020 Tokyo	Quadruple sculls
World Championships
Silver medal – second place	2022 Račice	Quadruple sculls
Bronze medal – third place	2017 Sarasota	Single sculls

Thomas Elliott Barras (born 7 January 1994) is a British rower. He won a bronze medal in the single scull at the 2017 World Championships and a silver medal in the quadruple scull at the Tokyo 2020 Olympic Games. He is also a qualified physiotherapist, having graduated with a degree in Physiotherapy from Cardiff University.

== Early life and education ==
Barras is from Staines-upon-Thames, Surrey, and learned to row aged eleven at Burway Rowing Club. He attended Tiffin School and then completed A Levels in PE, Biology, and Politics at Esher Sixth Form College. During his time at Esher, he was selected for the 2012 World Rowing Junior Championships, marking his first Great Britain vest. He graduated with a Bachelor of Science (BSc) in Physiotherapy from Cardiff University in 2015.

== Rowing career ==
After progressing through under-23 squads, Barras debuted at senior level in 2017 at Nathan Benderson Park, Sarasota, Florida, where his sprint secured bronze in the men’s single sculls behind Ondřej Synek and Ángel Fournier.

=== Tokyo 2020 Olympic silver ===
For the postponed Tokyo Games Barras joined Harry Leask, Angus Groom and Jack Beaumont in a rebuilt men’s quadruple sculls. . In the final the crew finished second to the Netherlands, earning Britain’s first Olympic medal in men’s quads. Barras later reflected that the result came from “head-down belief” in the closing strokes.

At the Paris 2024 Olympics he again stroked the quad, which finished fourth after a late charge for bronze.

== Achievements ==
=== Olympic Games ===
- 2024 – 4th, quadruple sculls (with Callum Dixon, Matthew Haywood, Graeme Thomas)
- 2020 – Silver, quadruple sculls (with Harry Leask, Angus Groom, Jack Beaumont)

=== World Championships ===
- 2022 – Silver, quadruple sculls (with Harry Leask, George Bourne, Matthew Haywood)
- 2017 – Bronze, single sculls

== Physiotherapy and mentoring ==
Alongside full-time training Barras practises musculoskeletal physiotherapy in NHS and private clinics. He continues to support Burway Rowing Club, mentoring junior athletes whenever his schedule allows.
