= 2026 World Rowing Championships – Mixed eight =

Mixed eight at the 2026 World Rowing Championships
- Venue: Bosbaan
- Location: Amsterdam, Netherlands
- Dates: 30 August
- Competitors: 54 from 6 nations
- Winning time: 5:35.75

Medalists
gold medal	Cristina Drugă; Amalia Chelaru; Adriana Adam; Florin Lehaci; Cosmin Iulian Plesescu; Ciprian Tudosă; Ștefan Berariu; Simona Radiș; Victoria-Ștefania Petreanu	Romania
silver medal	Linn van Aanholt; Nika Johanna Vos; Ymkje Clevering; Gert-Jan van Doorn; Lennart van Lierop; Eli Brouwer; Rik Rienks; Tinka Offereins; Richelle Rietdijk	Netherlands
bronze medal	Molly Bruggeman; Azja Czajkowski; Teal Cohen; Gus Rodríguez; Peter Chatain; Chris Carlson; Pieter Quinton; Kate Knifton; Rachel Rane	United States

The mixed eight competition at the 2026 World Rowing Championships will take place at Bosbaan, in Amsterdam.

== Schedule ==
The schedule was as follows:

Date	Time	Round
Sunday, 30 August 2026	16:08	Final

All times are Central European Summer Time (UTC+2)

== Results ==
=== Final ===
The Final determined the rankings for places 1 to 6.

Rank	Rower	Country	Time
1st place, gold medalist(s)	Cristina Drugă; Amalia Chelaru; Adriana Adam; Florin Lehaci; Cosmin Iulian Plesescu; Ciprian Tudosă; Ștefan Berariu; Simona Radiș; Victoria-Ștefania Petreanu (F) (c)	Romania	5:35.75
2nd place, silver medalist(s)	Linn van Aanholt; Nika Johanna Vos; Ymkje Clevering; Gert-Jan van Doorn; Lennart van Lierop; Eli Brouwer; Rik Rienks; Tinka Offereins; Richelle Rietdijk (F) (c)	Netherlands	5:38.42
3rd place, bronze medalist(s)	Molly Bruggeman; Azja Czajkowski; Teal Cohen; Gus Rodríguez; Peter Chatain; Chris Carlson; Pieter Quinton; Kate Knifton; Rachel Rane (F) (c)	United States	5:38.61
4	Alistair Gicqueau; Téo Rayet; Armand Pfister; Florian Ludwig; Mya Bosquet; Violaine Aernoudts; Emma Cornelis; Hézékia Péron; Malo Jacq Bodet (c)	France	5:45.71
5	Sarah Wibberenz; Lisa Gutfleisch; Hannah Reif; Frauke Hundeling; Benedict Eggeling; Tobias Strangemann; Leonard Brahms; René Schmela; Till Martini (c)	Germany	5:46.00
6	Lisa Lötscher; Fabienne Schweizer; Salome Ulrich; Maurin Lange; Donat Vonder Mühll; Patrick Brunner; Jonah Plock; Olivia Roth; Chiara Wicki (F) (c)	Switzerland	5:57.79
