= 2025 World Rowing Championships – Men's quadruple sculls =

Men's quadruple sculls at the 2025 World Rowing Championships
- Venue: Dianshan Lake
- Location: Shanghai, China
- Dates: 21–26 September
- Competitors: 57 from 14 nations
- Winning time: 5:48.08

Medalists
gold medal	Luca Chiumento; Luca Rambaldi; Andrea Panizza; Giacomo Gentili	Italy
silver medal	Cedol Dafydd; Callum Dixon; Matthew Haywood; Rory Harris	Great Britain
bronze medal	Dominik Czaja; Piotr Plominski; Jakub Woźniak; Konrad Domanski	Poland

The men's quadruple sculls competition at the 2025 World Rowing Championships took place at Dianshan Lake, in Shanghai.

== Schedule ==
The schedule was as follows:

Date	Time	Round
Sunday 21 September 2025	11:15	Heats
Tuesday, 23 September 2025	11:13	Semifinals
Tuesday, 23 September 2025	11:50	Final C
Thursday, 25 September 2025	13:53	Final B
Thursday, 25 September 2025	15:12	Final A

All times are UTC+08:00

== Results ==
=== Heats ===
The two fastest boats in each heat and the six fastest times advanced to the semifinals. The remaining boats were sent to the Final C.

==== Heat 1 ====
Rank	Rower	Country	Time	Notes
1	Cedol Dafydd; Callum Dixon; Matthew Haywood; Rory Harris	Great Britain	5:39.44	SF
2	Nathan Phelps; Jacob Plihal; Cedar Cunningham; Chris Carlson	United States	5:42.16	SF
3	Yoann Lamiral; Hugo Roch; Victor Marcelot; Martin Bauer	France	5:43.09	SF
4	Wangjia Wangjia; Mu Xiaolong; Liu Baishun; Zhang Quan	China	5:45.30	SF
5	Alexandru Gherasim; Nicu-Iulian Chelaru; Cristian-Vasile Nicoară; Florin Horodișteanu	Romania	5:48.13	SF

==== Heat 2 ====
Rank	Rower	Country	Time	Notes
1	Luca Chiumento; Luca Rambaldi; Andrea Panizza; Giacomo Gentili	Italy	5:38.09	SF
2	Mykola Mazur; Yuriy Ivanov; Oleksandr Nadtoka; Ivan Dovhodko	Ukraine	5:40.41	SF
3	Caetano Horta; Igor Teixidor Buch; Gonzalo García Ferrero; Jordi Jofre	Spain	5:40.84	SF
4	Nicholas Blackman; Johnson Daubney; Jackson Free; Alexander Rossi	Australia	5:43.86	SF
5	Filip Zima; Jan Čížek; Martin Ježek; Michal Zindulka	Czech Republic	5:45.44	SF

==== Heat 3 ====
Rank	Rower	Country	Time	Notes
1	Tom Graenitz; Felix Heinrich; Ole Hohensee; Oliver Holtz	Germany	5:43.71	SF
2	Dominik Czaja; Piotr Plominski; Jakub Woźniak; Konrad Domanski	Poland	5:46.39	SF
3	Boris Cesarec; Goran Mahmutović; Roko Bošković; Karlo Borković	Croatia	5:50.40	FC
4	Ronan Byrne; Brian Colsh; Adam Murphy; Andrew Sheehan	Ireland	5:51.97	FC

=== Semifinals ===
The three fastest boats in each heat advance to the Final A. The remaining boats were sent to the Final B.

==== Semifinal 1 ====
Rank	Rower	Country	Time	Notes
1	Luca Chiumento; Luca Rambaldi; Andrea Panizza; Giacomo Gentili	Italy	5:43.89	FA
2	Nathan Phelps; Jacob Plihal; Cedar Cunningham; Chris Carlson	United States	5:45.95	FA
3	Mykola Mazur; Yuriy Ivanov; Oleksandr Nadtoka; Ivan Dovhodko	Ukraine	5:47.16	FA
4	Alexandru Gherasim; Nicu-Iulian Chelaru; Cristian-Vasile Nicoară; Florin Horodișteanu	Romania	5:53.20	FB
5	Yoann Lamiral; Hugo Roch; Victor Marcelot; Martin Bauer	France	5:53.38	FB
6	Nicholas Blackman; Johnson Daubney; Jackson Free; Alexander Rossi	Australia	5:54.74	FB

==== Semifinal 2 ====
Rank	Rower	Country	Time	Notes
1	Cedol Dafydd; Callum Dixon; Matthew Haywood; Rory Harris	Great Britain	5:42.55	FA
2	Dominik Czaja; Piotr Plominski; Jakub Woźniak; Konrad Domanski	Poland	5:43.79	FA
3	Tom Graenitz; Felix Heinrich; Ole Hohensee; Oliver Holtz	Germany	5:44.94	FA
4	Wangjia Wangjia; Mu Xiaolong; Liu Baishun; Zhang Quan	China	5:48.11	FB
5	Caetano Horta; Igor Teixidor Buch; Gonzalo García Ferrero; Jordi Jofre	Spain	5:51.64	FB
6	Filip Zima; Jan Čížek; Martin Ježek; Michal Zindulka	Czech Republic	5:53.88	FB

=== Finals ===
The A final determined the rankings for places 1 to 6. Additional rankings were determined in the other finals.

==== Final C ====
Rank	Rower	Country	Time	Total rank
1	Ronan Byrne; Brian Colsh; Adam Murphy; Andrew Sheehan	Ireland	5:57.75	13
2	Boris Cesarec; Goran Mahmutović; Roko Bošković; Karlo Borković	Croatia	6:01.67	14

==== Final B ====
Rank	Rower	Country	Time	Total rank
1	Wangjia Wangjia; Mu Xiaolong; Liu Baishun; Zhang Quan	China	5:56.99	7
2	Caetano Horta; Igor Teixidor Buch; Gonzalo García Ferrero; Jordi Jofre	Spain	5:57.68	8
3	Alexandru Gherasim; Nicu-Iulian Chelaru; Cristian-Vasile Nicoară; Florin Horodișteanu	Romania	5:59.69	9
4	Jakub Podrazil; Jan Čížek; Martin Ježek; Michal Zindulka	Czech Republic	6:02.64	10
5	Yoann Lamiral; Hugo Roch; Victor Marcelot; Martin Bauer	France	6:02.69	11
6	Nicholas Blackman; Johnson Daubney; Jackson Free; Alexander Rossi	Australia	6:05.42	12

==== Final A ====
Rank	Rower	Country	Time	Notes
1st place, gold medalist(s)	Luca Chiumento; Luca Rambaldi; Andrea Panizza; Giacomo Gentili	Italy	5:48.08	
2nd place, silver medalist(s)	Cedol Dafydd; Callum Dixon; Matthew Haywood; Rory Harris	Great Britain	5:50.06	
3rd place, bronze medalist(s)	Dominik Czaja; Piotr Plominski; Jakub Woźniak; Konrad Domanski	Poland	5:51.34	
4	Nathan Phelps; Jacob Plihal; Cedar Cunningham; Chris Carlson	United States	5:55.61	
5	Tom Graenitz; Felix Heinrich; Ole Hohensee; Oliver Holtz	Germany	5:57.56	
6	Mykola Mazur; Yuriy Ivanov; Oleksandr Nadtoka; Ivan Dovhodko	Ukraine	6:06.82	
