= Fabian Barański =

Polish rower (born 1999)

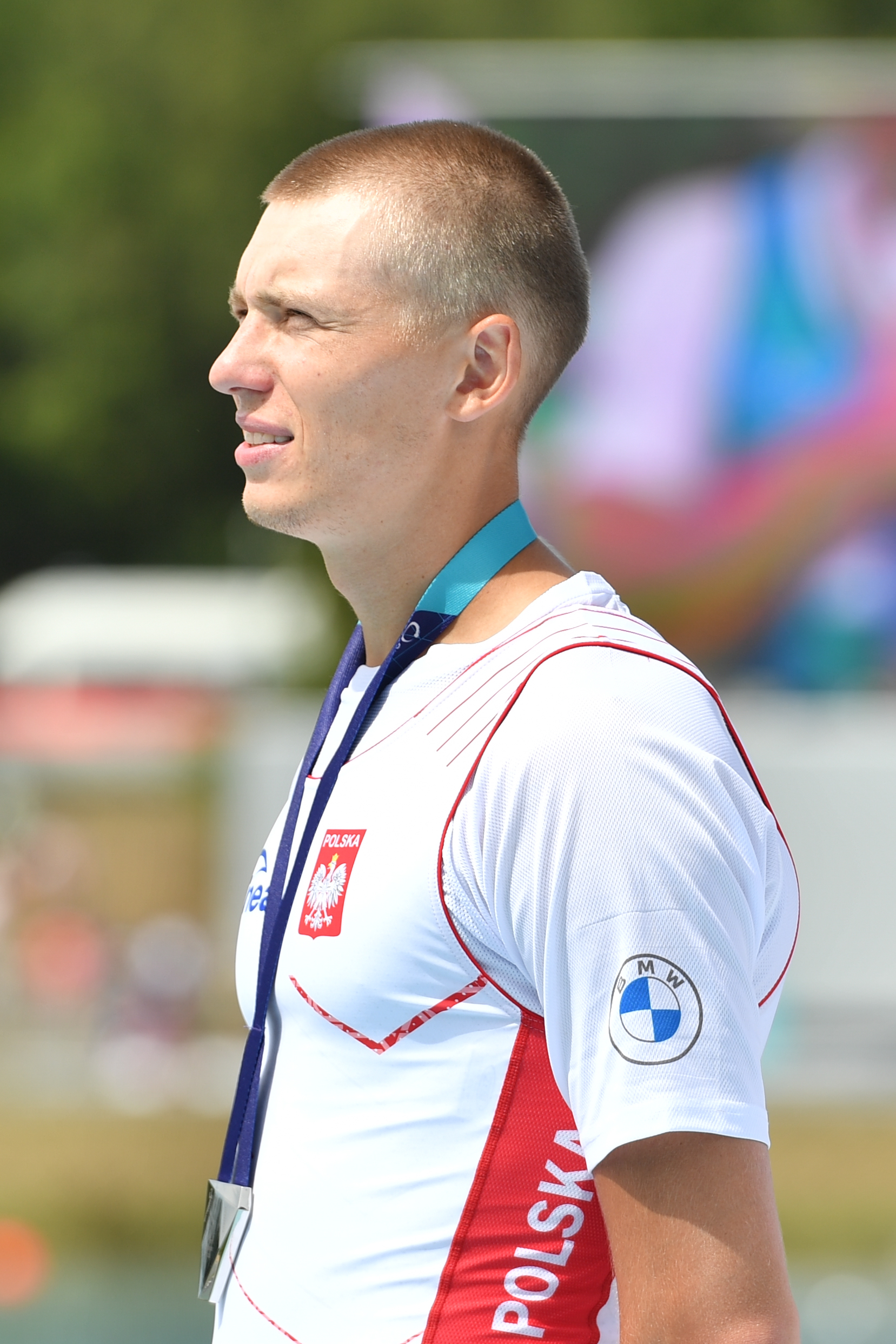
- Barański in 2022

Personal information
- Nationality: Polish
- Born: 27 May 1999 (age 27) Włocławek, Poland
- Height: 1.96 m (6 ft 5 in)
- Weight: 90 kg (198 lb)

Sport
- Country: Poland
- Sport: Rowing
- Event(s): Double sculls Quadruple sculls
- Club: WTW Włoclawek
Medal record
Men's rowing
Representing Poland
Olympic Games
Bronze medal – third place	2024 Paris	Quadruple sculls
World Championships
Gold medal – first place	2022 Račice	Quadruple sculls
Silver medal – second place	2019 Ottensheim	Quadruple sculls
Bronze medal – third place	2023 Belgrade	Quadruple sculls
European Championships
Gold medal – first place	2019 Lucerne	Double sculls
Gold medal – first place	2023 Bled	Quadruple sculls
Silver medal – second place	2022 Oberschleißheim	Quadruple sculls
Bronze medal – third place	2024 Szeged	Quadruple sculls

Fabian Barański (born 27 May 1999) is a Polish rower. He won a bronze medal in the quadruple sculls at the 2024 Summer Olympics in Paris.

He won medals at the 2019, 2022, and 2023 World Rowing Championships.
