= Peter Chatain =

American rower (born 1999)

Personal information
- Born: November 8, 1999 (age 26) Winnetka, Illinois, U.S.
- Education: Stanford University
- Height: 1.98 m (6 ft 6 in)

Sport
- Country: United States
- Sport: Rowing

Achievements and titles
- Olympic finals: Paris 2024 M8+
Medal record
Men's rowing
Representing the United States
Olympic Games
Bronze medal – third place	2024 Paris	Eight
World Championships
Gold medal – first place	2026 Amsterdam	Coxless four
Bronze medal – third place	2026 Amsterdam	Mixed eight
World U23 Championships
Silver medal – second place	2021 Racice	Eight
World Rowing Cup
Silver medal – second place	2024 Lucerne	Eight
Silver medal – second place	2026 Plovdiv	Pair
Silver medal – second place	2026 Plovdiv	Eight

Peter Chatain (born November 8, 1999) is an American rower. He won a bronze medal in the men's eight at the 2024 Summer Olympics.

== Early and personal life ==
He is from Winnetka, Illinois. When he was twelve, he discovered rowing when he attended a University of Michigan rowing camp. At New Trier High School, he initially played hockey but eventually dedicated himself to rowing.

He graduated from Stanford University in 2022 with a degree in mathematics and a minor in physics. He was a graduate student at Stanford University in 2023 studying computer science. After graduation, he worked as a machine learning engineer at a tech start-up firm in San Francisco while simultaneously training for the 2024 Olympics.

== Career ==
In 2021, he won silver with the United States at the Under-23 World Rowing Championships in the men's eight. He then competed in the United States men's eight at the 2023 World Rowing Championships.

He competed in the men's eight at the 2024 Paris Olympics and won a bronze medal with a time of 5:25.28. Competing in the men's pair at the 2026 World Rowing Cup in Plovdiv, Peter captured the silver medal and set a new American best time of 6:11.77.

Competing at the 2026 World Rowing Championships, he won gold in the men’s four and bronze in the mixed eight.
