= Andrea Panizza =

Italian rower (born 1998)

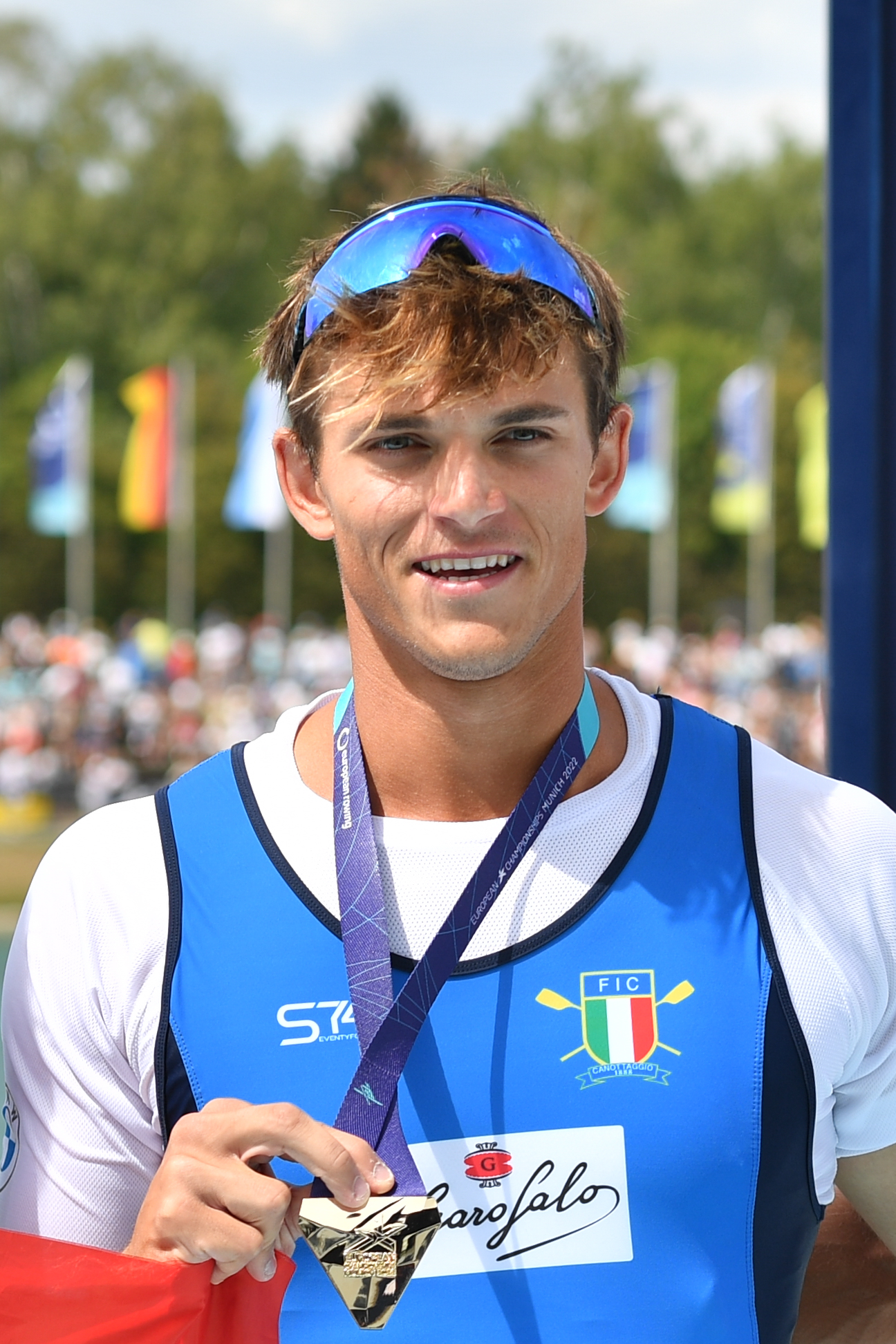

Personal information
- Born: 14 July 1998 (age 28) Lecco, Italy
- Height: 1.86 m (6 ft 1 in)
- Weight: 100 kg (220 lb)

Sport
- Country: Italy
- Sport: Rowing
- Event: Quadruple sculls
- Club: Fiamme Gialle

Achievements and titles
- Olympic finals: Tokyo 2020 M4X
Medal record
Men's rowing
Representing Italy
Olympic Games
| Silver medal – second place | 2024 Paris | Quadruple sculls |
World Championships
| Gold medal – first place | 2018 Plovdiv | Quadruple sculls |
| Gold medal – first place | 2025 Shanghai | Quadruple sculls |
| Gold medal – first place | 2026 Amsterdam | Quadruple sculls |
| Silver medal – second place | 2023 Belgrade | Quadruple sculls |
| Silver medal – second place | 2025 Shanghai | Mixed eight |
| Bronze medal – third place | 2019 Ottensheim | Quadruple sculls |
| Bronze medal – third place | 2022 Račice | Quadruple sculls |
European Championships
| Gold medal – first place | 2018 Glasgow | Quadruple sculls |
| Gold medal – first place | 2021 Varese | Quadruple sculls |
| Gold medal – first place | 2022 Oberschleißheim | Quadruple sculls |
| Gold medal – first place | 2024 Szeged | Quadruple sculls |
| Silver medal – second place | 2019 Lucerne | Quadruple sculls |
| Bronze medal – third place | 2017 Račice | Quadruple sculls |
| Bronze medal – third place | 2023 Bled | Quadruple sculls |
| Bronze medal – third place | 2026 Varese | Eight |

Andrea Panizza (born 14 July 1998) is an Italian rower. He competed at the 2020 Summer Olympics, in Quadruple sculls.

He participated at the 2018 World Rowing Championships where he became world champion in quad scull.
