= 2025 World Rowing Championships – Men's coxless four =

Men's coxless four at the 2025 World Rowing Championships
- Venue: Dianshan Lake
- Location: Shanghai, China
- Dates: 22–26 September
- Competitors: 76 from 19 nations
- Winning time: 5:48.48

Medalists
gold medal	Daniel Graham; James Robson; Douwe de Graaf; George Bourne	Great Britain
silver medal	Ștefan Berariu; Sergiu Bejan; Andrei Mândrilă; Ciprian Tudosă	Romania
bronze medal	Lennart van Lierop; Melvin Twellaar; Guillaume Krommenhoek; Gert-Jan van Doorn	Netherlands

The men's coxless four competition at the 2025 World Rowing Championships took place at Dianshan Lake, in Shanghai.

== Schedule ==
The schedule was as follows:

Date	Time	Round
Monday 22 September 2025	11:27	Heats
Wednesday, 24 September 2025	11:28	Semifinals
Wednesday, 24 September 2025	12:00	Final C
Friday, 26 September 2025	13:23	Final B
Friday, 26 September 2025	15:19	Final A

All times are UTC+08:00

== Results ==
=== Heats ===
The two fastest boats in each heat and the four fastest times advanced to the semifinals. Other crews to Final C and remaining crew eliminated.

==== Heat 1 ====
Rank	Rower	Country	Time	Notes
1	Ștefan Berariu; Sergiu Bejan; Andrei Mândrilă; Ciprian Tudosă	Romania	5:57.83	SF
2	Matthew Dunham; Zackary Rumble; Campbell Crouch; Flynn Eliadis-Watson	New Zealand	6:00.69	SF
3	Fazliddin Karimov; Dilshodjon Khudoyberdiev; Davrjon Davronov; Alisher Turdiev	Uzbekistan	6:02.37	SF
4	Axel Ewashko; Ryan Clegg; Steven Rosts; Joel Cullen	Canada	6:09.10	FC
5	Chan Tik Lun; Chen Pak Hong; Lam San Tung; To Siu Po	Hong Kong	BUW	El

==== Heat 2 ====
Rank	Rower	Country	Time	Notes
1	Daniel Graham; James Robson; Douwe de Graaf; George Bourne	Great Britain	5:54.18	SF
2	Nikolas Pender; Fergus Hamilton; Austin Reinehr; Alex Hill	Australia	5:56.54	SF
3	Lennart van Lierop; Melvin Twellaar; Guillaume Krommenhoek; Gert-Jan van Doorn	Netherlands	5:59.80	SF
4	Jorge Knabe; Pau Sánchez Batlle; Juan Miguel Palomino; Eric Pastor	Spain	6:11.74	FC
5	Li Fuyi; Ma Wenbo; Guo Yiwen; Guo Tingbiao	China	6:19.94	FC

==== Heat 3 ====
Rank	Rower	Country	Time	Notes
1	Dovydas Stankūnas; Mantas Juskevicius; Povilas Stankunas; Domantas Stankūnas	Lithuania	5:58.45	SF
2	Christian Tabash; Alexander Hedge; Gus Rodríguez; Pieter Quinton	United States	6:02.28	SF
3	Wolf Niclas Schroeder; René Schmela; Max John; Friedrich Amelingmeyer	Germany	6:05.65	FC
4	Joakim Viberg Larsen; Magnus Rathenborg; Aksel Poulsen; Magnus Valbirk	Denmark	6:09.01	FC
5	Jan Chládek; Miroslav Vokalek; Vit Baldinus; Tomáš Šišma	Czech Republic	6:12.32	FC

==== Heat 4 ====
Rank	Rower	Country	Time	Notes
1	Patrik Lončarić; Anton Lončarić; Martin Sinković; Valent Sinković	Croatia	5:59.89	SF
2	Armand Pfister; Hugo Boucheron; Valentin Onfroy; Teo Rayet	France	6:00.14	SF
3	Alfonso Scalzone; Davide Comini; Nunzio di Colandrea; Giovanni Codato	Italy	6:00.91	SF
4	Maksym Semenov; Oleh Kravchenko; Maksym Boklazhenko; Oleksii Selivanov	Ukraine	6:04.26	SF

=== Semifinals ===
The three fastest boats in each heat advance to the Final A. The remaining boats were sent to the Final B.

==== Semifinal 1 ====
Rank	Rower	Country	Time	Notes
1	Daniel Graham; James Robson; Douwe de Graaf; George Bourne	Great Britain	5:52.03	FA
2	Lennart van Lierop; Melvin Twellaar; Guillaume Krommenhoek; Gert-Jan van Doorn	Netherlands	5:53.86	FA
3	Nikolas Pender; Fergus Hamilton; Austin Reinehr; Alex Hill	Australia	5:55.83	FA
4	Christian Tabash; Alexander Hedge; Gus Rodríguez; Pieter Quinton	United States	5:58.18	FB
5	Patrik Lončarić; Anton Lončarić; Martin Sinković; Valent Sinković	Croatia	6:01.31	FB
6	Maksym Semenov; Oleh Kravchenko; Maksym Boklazhenko; Oleksii Selivanov	Ukraine	6:07.41	FB

==== Semifinal 2 ====
Rank	Rower	Country	Time	Notes
1	Dovydas Stankūnas; Mantas Juskevicius; Povilas Stankunas; Domantas Stankūnas	Lithuania	5:54.75	FA
2	Ștefan Berariu; Sergiu Bejan; Andrei Mândrilă; Ciprian Tudosă	Romania	5:56.53	FA
3	Armand Pfister; Hugo Boucheron; Valentin Onfroy; Teo Rayet	France	5:56.94	FA
4	Matthew Dunham; Zackary Rumble; Campbell Crouch; Flynn Eliadis-Watson	New Zealand	5:57.94	FB
5	Alfonso Scalzone; Davide Comini; Nunzio di Colandrea; Giovanni Codato	Italy	6:04.41	FB
6	Fazliddin Karimov; Dilshodjon Khudoyberdiev; Davrjon Davronov; Alisher Turdiev	Uzbekistan	6:05.12	FB

=== Finals ===
The A final determined the rankings for places 1 to 6. Additional rankings were determined in the other finals.

==== Final C ====
Rank	Rower	Country	Time	Total rank
1	Jan Chládek; Miroslav Vokalek; Vit Baldinus; Tomáš Šišma	Czech Republic	6:06.95	13
2	Joakim Viberg Larsen; Magnus Rathenborg; Aksel Poulsen; Magnus Valbirk	Denmark	6:06.99	14
3	Wolf Niclas Schroeder; René Schmela; Max John; Friedrich Amelingmeyer	Germany	6:08.40	15
4	Jorge Knabe; Pau Sánchez Batlle; Juan Miguel Palomino; Eric Pastor	Spain	6:09.98	16
5	Axel Ewashko; Ryan Clegg; Steven Rosts; Joel Cullen	Canada	6:13.20	17
6	Li Fuyi; Ma Wenbo; Guo Yiwen; Guo Tingbiao	China	6:18.68	18

==== Final B ====
Rank	Rower	Country	Time	Total rank
1	Patrik Lončarić; Anton Lončarić; Martin Sinković; Valent Sinković	Croatia	6:01.42	7
2	Matthew Dunham; Zackary Rumble; Campbell Crouch; Flynn Eliadis-Watson	New Zealand	6:04.24	8
3	Maksym Semenov; Oleh Kravchenko; Maksym Boklazhenko; Oleksii Selivanov	Ukraine	6:07.05	9
4	Fazliddin Karimov; Dilshodjon Khudoyberdiev; Davrjon Davronov; Alisher Turdiev	Uzbekistan	6:07.59	10
5	Christian Tabash; Alexander Hedge; Gus Rodríguez; Pieter Quinton	United States	6:50.64	11
6	Alfonso Scalzone; Davide Comini; Nunzio di Colandrea; Giovanni Codato	Italy	DNS	12

==== Final A ====
Rank	Rower	Country	Time	Notes
1st place, gold medalist(s)	Daniel Graham; James Robson; Douwe de Graaf; George Bourne	Great Britain	5:48.48	
2nd place, silver medalist(s)	Ștefan Berariu; Sergiu Bejan; Andrei Mândrilă; Ciprian Tudosă	Romania	5:50.56	
3rd place, bronze medalist(s)	Lennart van Lierop; Melvin Twellaar; Guillaume Krommenhoek; Gert-Jan van Doorn	Netherlands	5:52.01	
4	Dovydas Stankūnas; Mantas Juskevicius; Povilas Stankunas; Domantas Stankūnas	Lithuania	5:53.54	
5	Nikolas Pender; Fergus Hamilton; Austin Reinehr; Alex Hill	Australia	5:58.60	
6	Armand Pfister; Hugo Boucheron; Valentin Onfroy; Teo Rayet	France	6:01.10	
