= Giacomo Gentili =

Italian rower (born 1997)

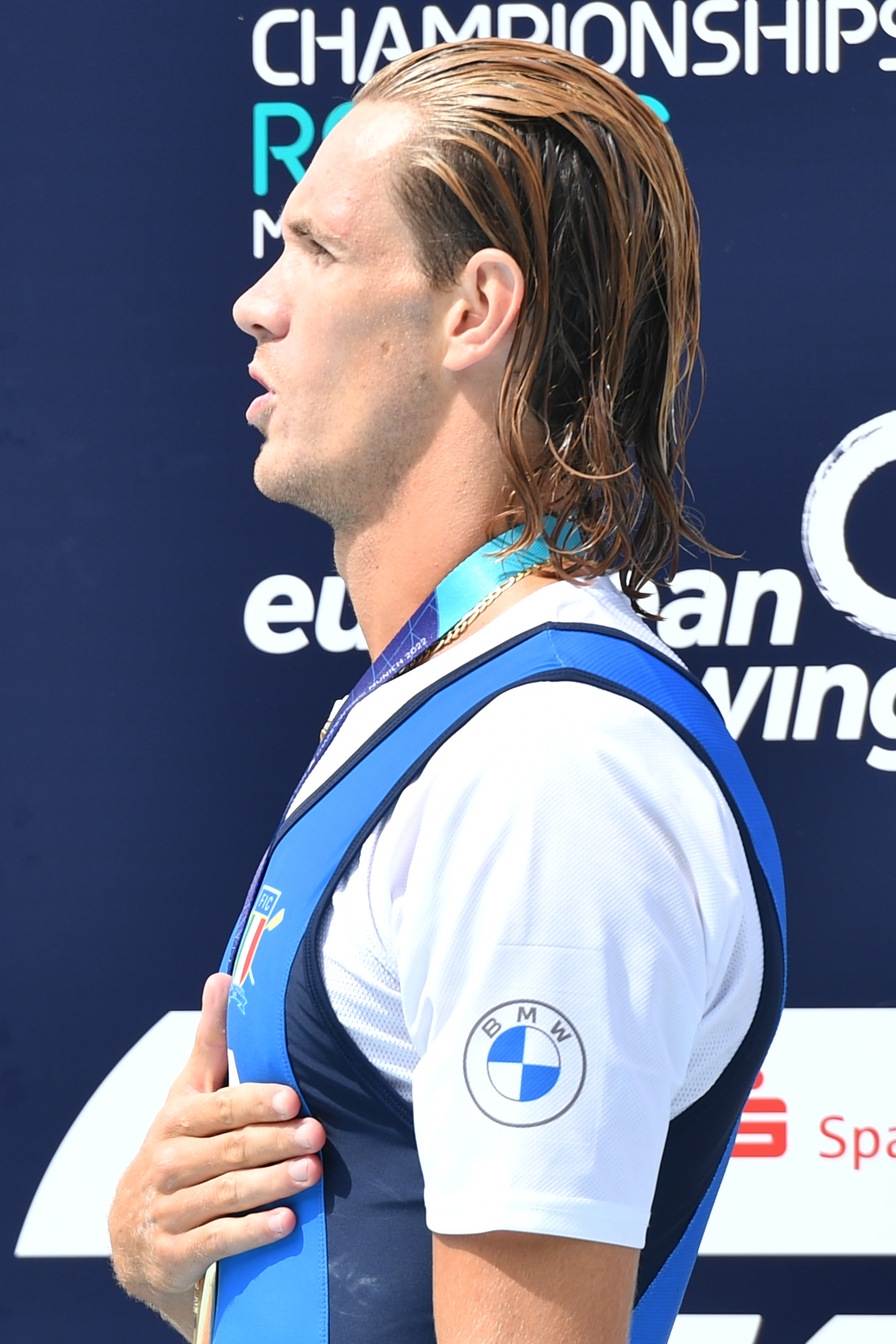

Personal information
- Born: 3 July 1997 (age 29) Cremona, Italy
- Height: 1.98 m (6 ft 6 in)

Sport
- Country: Italy
- Sport: Rowing
- Event: Quadruple sculls
- Club: Fiamme Gialle

Achievements and titles
- Olympic finals: Tokyo 2020 M4X
Medal record
Men's rowing
Representing Italy
Olympic Games
Silver medal – second place	2024 Paris	Quadruple sculls
World Championships
Gold medal – first place	2018 Plovdiv	Quadruple sculls
Gold medal – first place	2025 Shanghai	Quadruple sculls
Gold medal – first place	2026 Amsterdam	Quadruple sculls
Silver medal – second place	2023 Belgrade	Quadruple sculls
Silver medal – second place	2025 Shanghai	Mixed eight
Bronze medal – third place	2019 Ottensheim	Quadruple sculls
Bronze medal – third place	2022 Račice	Quadruple sculls
European Championships
Gold medal – first place	2018 Glasgow	Quadruple sculls
Gold medal – first place	2021 Varese	Quadruple sculls
Gold medal – first place	2022 Oberschleißheim	Quadruple sculls
Gold medal – first place	2024 Szeged	Quadruple sculls
Silver medal – second place	2019 Lucerne	Quadruple sculls
Silver medal – second place	2020 Poznań	Quadruple sculls
Bronze medal – third place	2017 Račice	Quadruple sculls
Bronze medal – third place	2023 Bled	Quadruple sculls

Giacomo Gentili (born 3 July 1997) is an Italian rower. He is a world champion and an Olympic finalist, and competed at the 2020 Summer Olympics, in Quadruple sculls.

He participated at the 2018 World Rowing Championships where he became world champion in quad scull. The following year, he won bronze in the men's quad at the 2019 World Rowing Championships.
