= Nicolò Carucci =

Italian rower (born 2001)

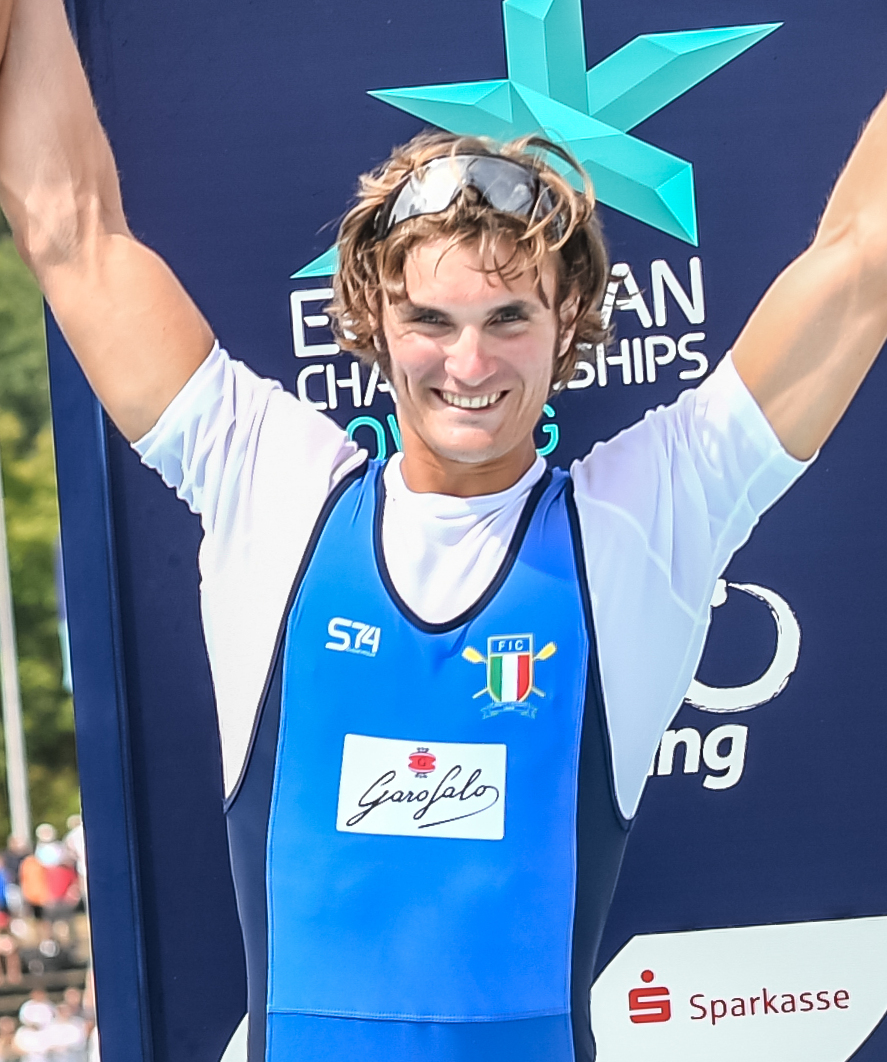

Personal information
- Nationality: Italian
- Born: 22 February 2001 (age 25) Milan, Italy

Sport
- Country: Italy
- Sport: Rowing
Medal record
Men's rowing
Representing Italy
World Championships
| Silver medal – second place | 2023 Belgrade | Quadruple sculls |
| Bronze medal – third place | 2022 Račice | Quadruple sculls |
European Championships
| Gold medal – first place | 2022 Oberschleißheim | Quadruple sculls |
| Gold medal – first place | 2024 Szeged | Quadruple sculls |
| Bronze medal – third place | 2023 Bled | Quadruple sculls |
European U23 Championships
| Gold medal – first place | 2020 Duisburg | Single sculls |

Nicolò Carucci (born 22 February 2001 in Milan) is an Italian rower.

He won the gold medal in the single sculls at European U23 Championships in 2020.
