= 2021 World Rowing Junior Championships =

- Location: Plovdiv, Bulgaria
- Dates: 11–15 August

The 54th World Rowing Junior Championships took place from 11 to 15 August 2021 in Plovdiv, Bulgaria.These rowers are all 18 years of age or younger consisting of 14 boat classes.

== Results ==
=== Men ===
Event	Gold		Silver		Bronze	
Single scull (JM1x)	Povilas Juškevičius; Lithuania	07:02.00	Aaron Andries; Belgium	07:02.60	Isaiah Harrison; United States	07:03.67
Coxless pair (JM2-)	Romania; Andrei-Petrisor Axintoi; Iliuta-Leontin Nutescu	06:41.99	Germany; Paul Martin; Kieran Holthues	06:43.65	Canada; Alexander Gonin; Matteo Banducci	06:45.22
Double scull (JM2x)	Germany; Finn Stäblein; Adrian Groth	06:28.32	France; Samuel Arque; Martin Bauer	06:34.20	Poland; Mikołaj Kulka; Daniel Galeza	06:35.13
Coxless four (JM4-)	Spain; Jorge Knabe; Pablo Moreno; Juan Palomino; Eric Pastor	06:03.66	Italy; Pietro Gilli; Antonio Distefano; Victor Kushnir; Francesco Bardelli	06:06.56	Germany; Johann Svoboda; Lukas Wojciechowski; Kort Fricke; Mika Richter	06:09.86
Coxed four (JM4+)	Italy; Emilio Pappalettera; Simone Pappalepore; Luca Vicino; Marco Vicino; Andrea Pagliaro	06:18.23	Turkey; Enver Erman; Serkan Erkal; Kaan Aydın; Ali Ardıl İlgün; Ege Büyükçetin	06:21.53	France; Balthazar Chove; Pierre-Esteban Soubeste; Ethan Chouraqui; Awen Thomas; Lucie Mercier	06:24.31
Quad scull (JM4x)	Germany; Timo Strache; Adrian-Nick Bastian; Sydney Garbers; Maximilian Pfautsch	05:52.22	Italy; Francesco Pallozzi; Marco Gandola; Nicolò Bizzozero; Andrea Licatalosi	05:54.59	Czech Republic; Jiří Ingr; Jan Čížek; Jan Koška; Adam Šnajdr	05:56.10
Eight (JM8+)	United States; Stephen Warming; Aidan Murphy; Julian Thomas; Miles Hudgins; John Patton; Jordan Dykema; Ryan Link; Tyler Horler; Adam Casler	05:47.70	Germany; Fritz Rautenberg; Dominic Ruehling; Elias Wittenburg; Hannes Post; Mark Kohlbach; Moritz Grauert; Enno Mönch; Henning Käufer; Lina Mistera	05:50.03	Russia; Ivan Pozdniakov; Alexander Nikolaev; Dmitrii Gunkin; Daniil Smirnov; Ignat Trembach; Mikhail Deriugin; Lev Dobriantsev; Kirill Solomonov; Ivan Chebotarev	05:52.17

=== Women ===
Event	Gold		Silver		Bronze	
Single sculls	Aurelia-Maxima Janzen; Switzerland	07:55.02	Giulia Clerici; Italy	07:57.37	Evangelia Fragkou; Greece	07:57.53
Coxless pair	France; Zélie Jacoulet; Fleur Vaucoret	07:29.90	Chile; Magdalena Jesus Nannig Rojas; Antonia Leonor Liewald Heise	07:30.39	Germany; Lena Gresens; Anni Kötitz	07:32.17
Double sculls	Netherlands; Lotta van Westreenen; Phaedra Van Der Molen	07:13.80	France; Gaia Chiavini; Jeanne Roche	07:14.06	Ireland; Holly Davis; Rachel Bradley	07:15.62
Coxless four	Romania; Daria-Ioana Dinulescu; Maria Guzran; Elena-Maria Robitu; Ancuta-Adelina Ungurean	06:51.15	France; Céline Gorguet; Lea Herscovici; Jeanne Sellier; Agathe Oudet	06:52.26	Italy; Giorgia Sciattella; Emma Cuzzocrea; Irene Cravero; Elisa Grisoni	06:52.39
Coxed four	United States; Quincy Stone; Imogen Cabot; Jane Cox; Julia Veith; Victoria Grieder	07:05.90	Italy; Vittoria Calabrese; Alice Codato; Anna Benazzo; Chiara Benvenuti; Serena Mossi	07:11.41	Germany; Anna Hördemann; Paula Becher; Emma Arp; Nora Radke; Anna Lena Brökel	07:15.19
Quadruple sculls	Switzerland; Thalia Ahumada Ireland; Nicole Schmid; Lina Kühn; Olivia Roth	06:34.81	Italy; Susanna Pedrola; Giulia Bosio; Alice Gnatta; Francesca Rubeo	06:36.19	Germany; Rebecca Falkenberg; Lina Goetze; Johanna Debus; Marlene Schollmeyer	06:38.65
Eight	United States; Elsa Hartman; Catherine van Stone; Paloma Sequeira; Sophie Klessel; Mia Levy; Julietta Camahort; Sofia Simone; Nora Goodwillie; Lauren Peters	06:34.51	Germany; Andra Aumann; Johanna Sziedat; Celina Grunwald; Anna Schepinski; Marie-Luise Kohlbach; Frederike Förster; Eva Weitzel; Emilia Fritz; Magdalena Hallay	06:38.20	Romania; Elena Silvia Mocanu; Elena-Andreea Cerbu; Ana-Maria Loghin; Florentina-Georgiana Neculaeasa; Valentina Amalia Azoitei; Alexandra-Georgiana Ruscuta; Petruta-Ionela Popa; Mariana-Laura Dumitru; Victoria-Stefania Petreanu	06:39.89

== Medal table ==
* Host nation (Bulgaria)

Rank	Nation	Gold	Silver	Bronze	Total
1	United States (USA)	3	0	1	4
2	Germany (GER)	2	3	4	9
3	Romania (ROU)	2	0	1	3
4	Switzerland (SUI)	2	0	0	2
5	Italy (ITA)	1	5	1	7
6	France (FRA)	1	3	1	5
7	Lithuania (LTU)	1	0	0	1
7	Netherlands (NED)	1	0	0	1
7	Spain (ESP)	1	0	0	1
10	Belgium (BEL)	0	1	0	1
10	Chile (CHI)	0	1	0	1
10	Turkey (TUR)	0	1	0	1
13	Canada (CAN)	0	0	1	1
13	Czech Republic (CZE)	0	0	1	1
13	Greece (GRE)	0	0	1	1
13	Ireland (IRL)	0	0	1	1
13	Poland (POL)	0	0	1	1
13	Russia (RUS)	0	0	1	1
Totals (18 entries)		14	14	14	42
