= 2020 Baltic Rowing Championships =

- Venue: Galvė
- Location: Trakai, Lithuania
- Date: August 7–8

The 2020 Baltic Rowing Championships were held in Trakai, Lithuania on 7–8 of August 2020. Rowers from Lithuania, Latvia and Estonia competed for the Baltic champions title.

== Medallists ==
=== Men's ===
Event	Gold	Silver	Bronze
M1x	Giedrius Bieliauskas; Lithuania	Dominykas Jančionis; Lithuania	Kaur Kuslap; Estonia
M2x	Lithuania; Dovydas Nemeravičius; Aurimas Adomavičius	Estonia; Allar Raja; Juri-Mikk Udam	Estonia; Ander Koppel; Elar Loot
M4x	Lithuania; Paulius Černevičius; Justas Kuskevičius; Domantas Maročka; Virgilijus Prušinskas	Lithuania; Benas Paunksnis; Arnedas Kelmelis; Povilas Juškevičius; Rokas Jakubauskas	Estonia; Kristofer Karl Orgse; Siim Uku Timmusk; Hannes Lehemets; Mark Kiradi

=== Women's ===
Event	Gold	Silver	Bronze
W1x	Ieva Adomavičiūtė; Lithuania	Lina Šaltytė-Masilionė; Lithuania	Viktorija Senkutė; Lithuania
W2x	Lithuania; Viktorija Senkutė; Ieva Adomavičiūtė	Estonia; Elo Luik; Liisu Mitt	Lithuania; Ugnė Juzėnaitė; Dovilė Rimkutė

== Medal table ==
* Host nation (Lithuania)

Rank	Nation	Gold	Silver	Bronze	Total
1	Lithuania*	5	3	2	10
2	Estonia	0	2	3	5
3	Latvia	0	0	0	0
Totals (3 entries)		5	5	5	15
