= Guillaume Krommenhoek =

Dutch rower (born 1992)

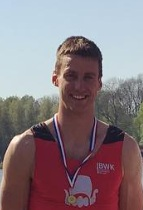

Personal information
- Born: 11 July 1992 (age 33) Amsterdam, Netherlands
- Height: 2.02 m (6 ft 8 in)

Sport
- Country: Netherlands
- Sport: Rowing
- Club: AASR Skol
Medal record
Men's rowing
Representing the Netherlands
World Championships
Silver medal – second place	2022 Račice	Eight
Silver medal – second place	2023 Belgrade	Eight
Bronze medal – third place	2025 Shanghai	Coxless four
European Championships
Silver medal – second place	2025 Plovdiv	Eight
Silver medal – second place	2022 Munich	Eight

Guillaume Krommenhoek (born 11 July 1992) is a Dutch rower. After he quit his American Football career he started rowing in 2015 at students rowing association A.A.S.R. Skoll. He competed in the men's coxless pair at the 2020 Summer Olympics. Currently he is the stroke of the men's eight that won a silver medal at the 2022 World Rowing Championships. He is preparing to compete in his second consecutive Olympics in Paris in 2024.
