= The Boat Race 2025 =

Cambridge vs Oxford rowing race

- Date: 13 April 2025

Men's race
- Winner: Cambridge
- Winning time: 16 minutes 56 seconds
- Overall record (Cambridge–Oxford): 88–81
- Umpire: Sarah Winckless

Women's race
- Winner: Cambridge
- Winning time: 19 minutes 24 seconds
- Overall record (Cambridge–Oxford): 49–30
- Umpire: Matthew Pinsent

The Boat Race 2025 was a series of side-by-side rowing races in London which took place on 13 April 2025.

Held annually, The Boat Race is contested between crews from the universities of Oxford and Cambridge, usually along a 4.2-mile (6.8 km) tidal stretch of the River Thames, known as the Tideway, in south-west London. This was the 79th women's race and the 170th men's race. As with the previous year, Cambridge won both the men's and women's races.

This was the last Boat Race to be televised by the BBC and from 2026, all men's and women's boat races will be broadcast on Channel 4.

== Background ==
The Championship Course along which the races were conducted (historic names used)

The Boat Race is an annual side-by-side rowing competition between the University of Oxford (sometimes referred to as the "Dark Blues") and the University of Cambridge (sometimes referred to as the "Light Blues"). First held in 1829, the race usually takes place on the 4.2-mile (6.8 km) Championship Course, between Putney and Mortlake on the River Thames in south-west London.

The rivalry is a major point of honour between the two universities; the race is followed throughout the United Kingdom and broadcast worldwide.

The French luxury brand Chanel took over the title sponsor for the 2025 race. The Chanel J12 Boat Race is named after the J12 unisex watch launched by Chanel in 2000 and "inspired by the J Class 12-metre race boats from the early 20th century".

== Crews ==
The crews were announced on 26 March 2025 at Battersea Power Station.

=== Men ===
Seat	Cambridge			Oxford		
Seat	Name	Nationality	College	Name	Nationality	College
Bow	Simon Hatcher	American	Peterhouse	Tom Sharrock	British	Magdalen
2	Noam Mouelle	French	Hughes Hall	William O'Connell	Australian	Oriel
3	Luke Beever	British	Emmanuel	Felix Rawlinson	British	Reuben
4	Gabriel Mahler	Czech	Peterhouse	James Doran	British/Irish	Oriel
5	George Bourne	British	Peterhouse	Tassilo von Müller	German	Hertford
6	James Robson	British	Peterhouse	Tom Mackintosh (President)	New Zealander	Oriel
7	Luca Ferraro (President)	British	Peterhouse	Nick Rusher	American	Oriel
Stroke	Douwe de Graaf	British/Dutch	St Edmund's	Nicholas Kohl	Italian/German	Wolfson
Cox	Ollie Boyne	British	Downing	Tobias Bernard	British/French	Magdalen

=== Women ===
Seat	Cambridge			Oxford		
Seat	Name	Nationality	College	Name	Nationality	College
Bow	Katy Hempson	British	Christ's	Sarah Polsom	American/British	Wolfson
2	Gemma King	British	St John's	Lilli Freischem	German	Reuben
3	Carys Earl	British/Swiss	Gonville & Caius	Tessa Haining	American/British	Balliol
4	Annie Wertheimer	American	St Edmund's	Alexia Lowe	British/French	St Antony's
5	Sophia Hahn	American/German	Hughes Hall	Sarah Marshall	British	Jesus
6	Claire Collins	American	Peterhouse	Annie Anezakis (President)	Australian	Pembroke
7	Tash Morrice	British	Jesus	Kyra Delray	British	Wolfson
Stroke	Samantha Morton	Australian	Hughes Hall	Heidi Long	British	Lady Margaret Hall
Cox	Jack Nicholas	British/South African	Pembroke	Daniel Orton	British	Merton

== Races ==
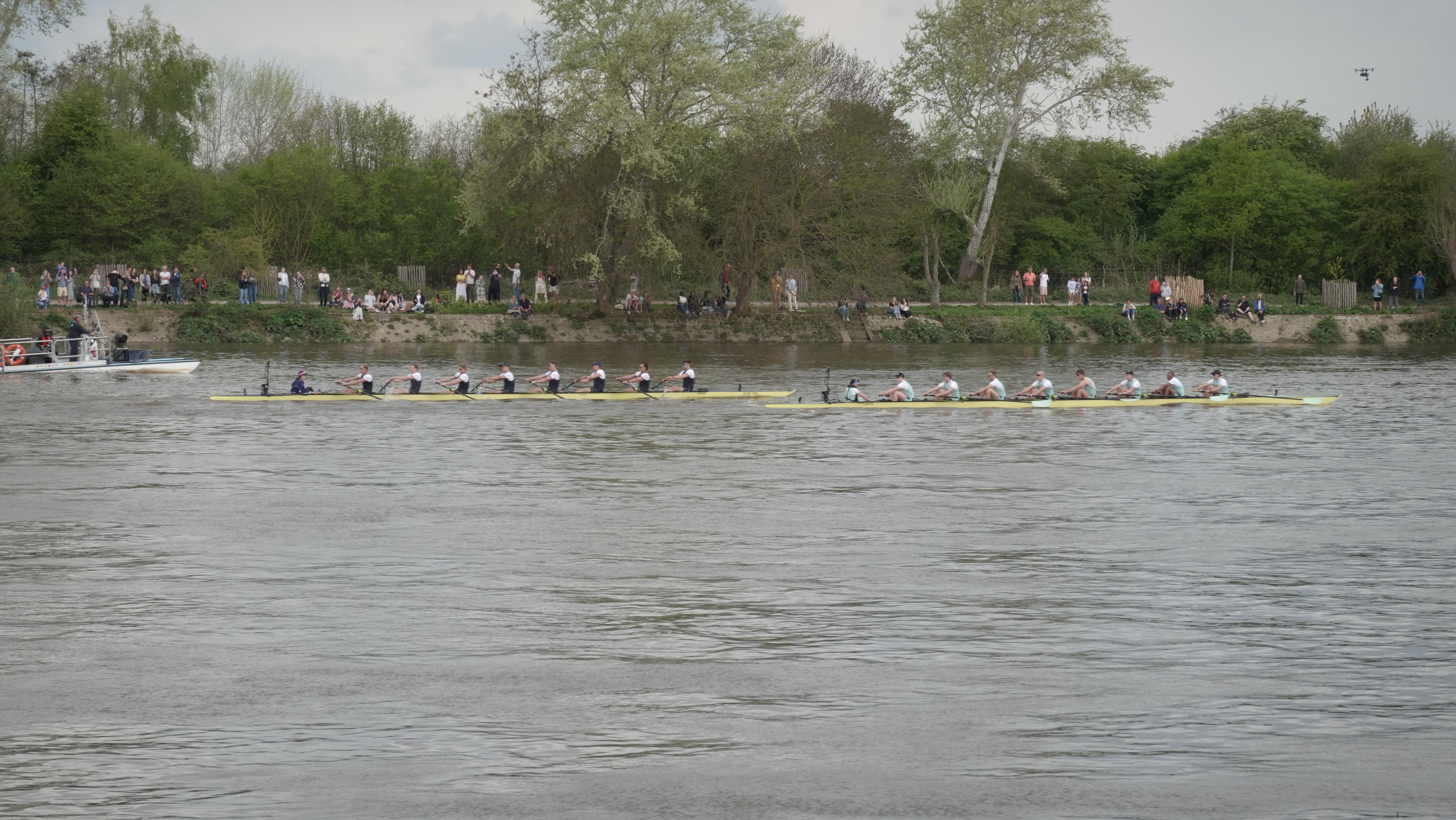
Cambridge leading the men's race just after passing Craven Cottage, Fulham

=== Women's ===
The women's race, umpired by Matthew Pinsent, began at 13:21 BST but was temporarily halted when the Oxford crew drifted towards Cambridge and the teams' oars collided. Pinsent considered disqualifying Oxford, but the race restarted with a one-third-length advantage to Cambridge. Cambridge won the race with a time of 19:24.80, beating Oxford by 7.72 seconds.

=== Men's ===
The men's race, umpired by Sarah Winckless, was scheduled to commence at 14:21, but was postponed for ten minutes while debris in the river was cleared. Cambridge won the race with a time of 16:56.72, beating Oxford by 16.22 seconds.
