= Luca Chiumento =

Italian rower (born 1997)

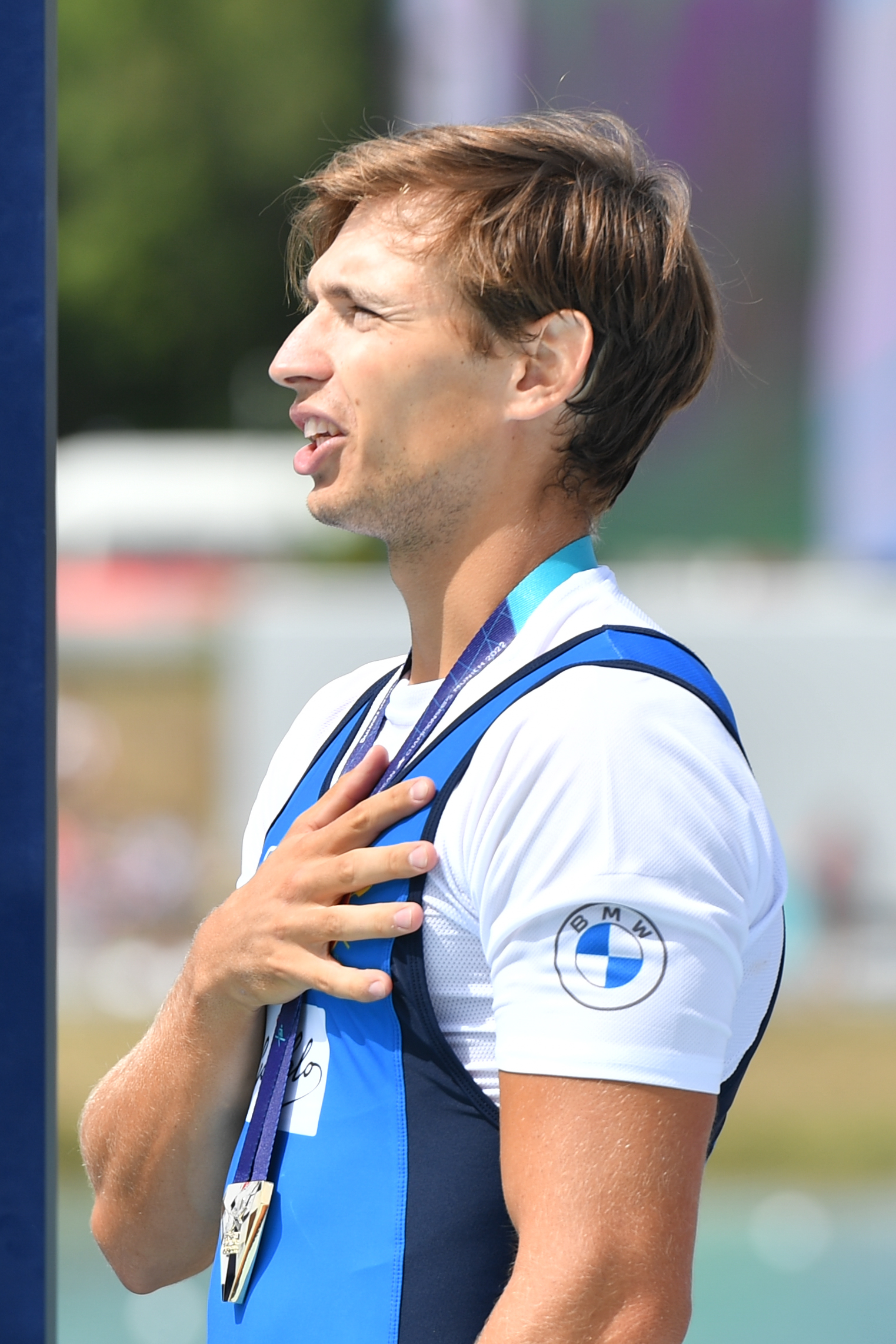

Personal information
- Born: 19 November 1997 (age 28) Padua, Italy

Sport
- Country: Italy
- Sport: Rowing
- Club: Fiamme Gialle
Medal record
Men's rowing
Representing Italy
Olympic Games
Silver medal – second place	2024 Paris	Quadruple sculls
World Championships
Gold medal – first place	2025 Shanghai	Quadruple sculls
Gold medal – first place	2026 Amsterdam	Quadruple sculls
Silver medal – second place	2023 Belgrade	Quadruple sculls
Bronze medal – third place	2022 Račice	Quadruple sculls
European Championships
Gold medal – first place	2022 Oberschleißheim	Quadruple sculls
Gold medal – first place	2024 Szeged	Quadruple sculls
Silver medal – second place	2020 Poznań	Quadruple sculls
Bronze medal – third place	2023 Bled	Quadruple sculls
Bronze medal – third place	2026 Varese	Eight

Luca Chiumento (born 19 November 1997) is an Italian rower who won a gold medal at the 2022 European Rowing Championships.
