= Finn Florijn =

Dutch rower (born 1999)

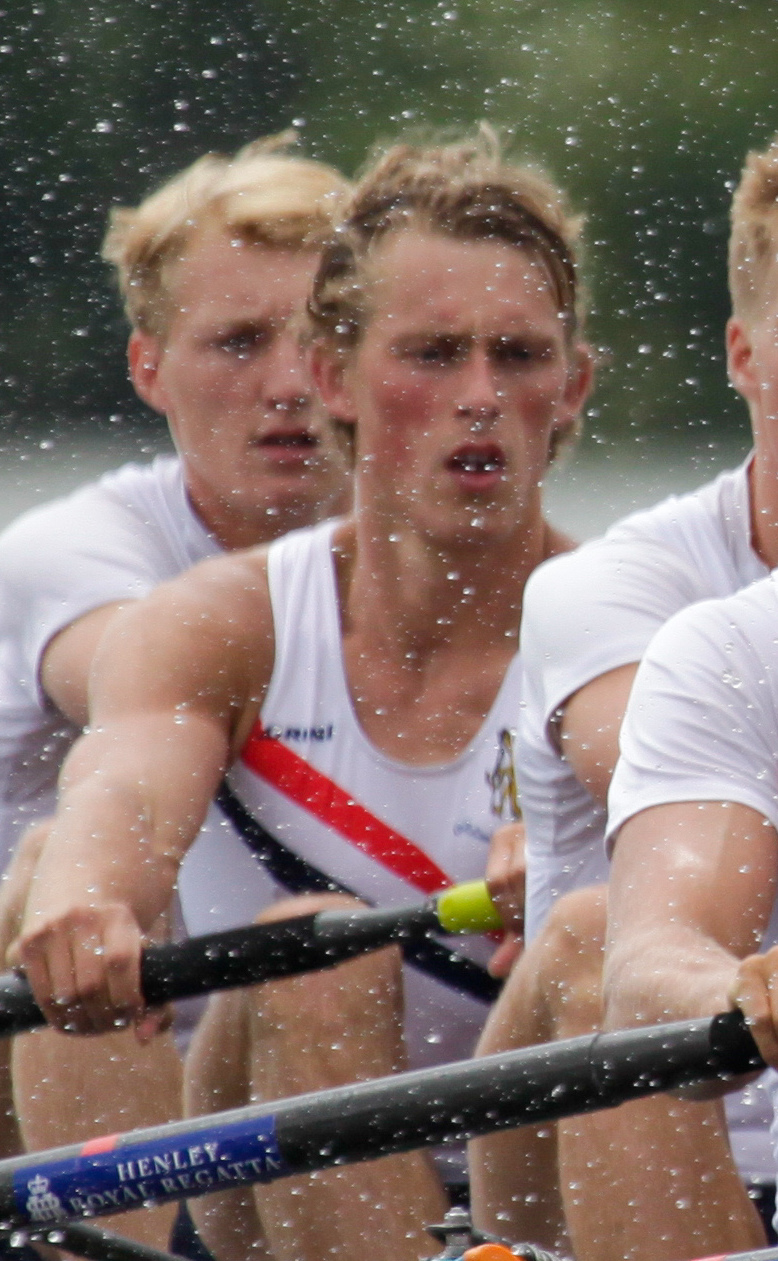

Personal information
- Nationality: Dutch
- Born: 29 November 1999 (age 26) Leiden, Netherlands
- Parent: Ronald Florijn (father)
- Relative: Karolien Florijn (sister)

Sport
- Country: Netherlands
- Sport: Rowing
Medal record
Olympic Games
Gold medal – first place	2024 Paris	Quadruple sculls
World Championships
Gold medal – first place	2023 Belgrade	Quadruple sculls
Gold medal – first place	2025 Shanghai	Eight
Gold medal – first place	2026 Amsterdam	Eight
European Championships
Silver medal – second place	2023 Bled	Quadruple sculls

Finn Florijn (born 29 November 1999) is a Dutch rower.

He is the son of Ronald Florijn, who won gold at the 1988 Summer Olympics in the double sculls and gold at the 1996 Summer Olympics in the eight and Antje Rehaag, another Olympic rower. His sister is Karolien Florijn, who won silver at the 2020 Summer Olympics Women's coxless four and gold at the 2024 Summer Olympics Women's single sculls.

He competed in the heats of the 2020 Summer Olympics, but had to withdraw before the repechage because he had contracted COVID-19.

He was more successful in the 2024 Summer Olympics, where he was a member of the Dutch team that won the gold medal in the Men's quadruple sculls.
