= Cosmin Iulian Plesescu =

Romanian rower (born 2004)

Personal information
- Nationality: Romanian
- Born: 26 March 2004 (age 22)

Sport
- Country: Romania
- Sport: Rowing
Medal record
Men's rowing
Representing Romania
World Championships
Gold medal – first place	2026 Amsterdam	Mixed eight
European Championships
Silver medal – second place	2026 Varese	Coxless four

Cosmin Iulian Plesescu (born 26 March 2004) is a Romanian rower.

== Career ==
On 1 August 2026, Plesescu competed at the 2026 European Rowing Championships and won a silver medal in the coxless four with a time of 5:44.13. Later that month he competed at the 2026 World Rowing Championships and won a gold medal in the mixed eight with a time of 5:35.75.
