= Povilas Juškevičius =

Lithuanian rower (born 2003)

Personal information
- Born: 5 February 2003 (age 23)

Sport
- Club: Kaunas Bangpūtys
Medal record
Men's rowing
Representing Lithuania
World Junior Championships
Gold medal – first place	2021 Plovdiv	Single sculls
Baltic Championships
Silver medal – second place	2020 Trakai	Quadruple sculls

Povilas Juškevičius (born 5 February 2003) is a Lithuanian rower.

At the 2021 World Junior Championships, he won gold medal at the single sculls event.

University of Washington oarsman 2022–Present.
