= Dominik Czaja =

Polish rower (born 1995)

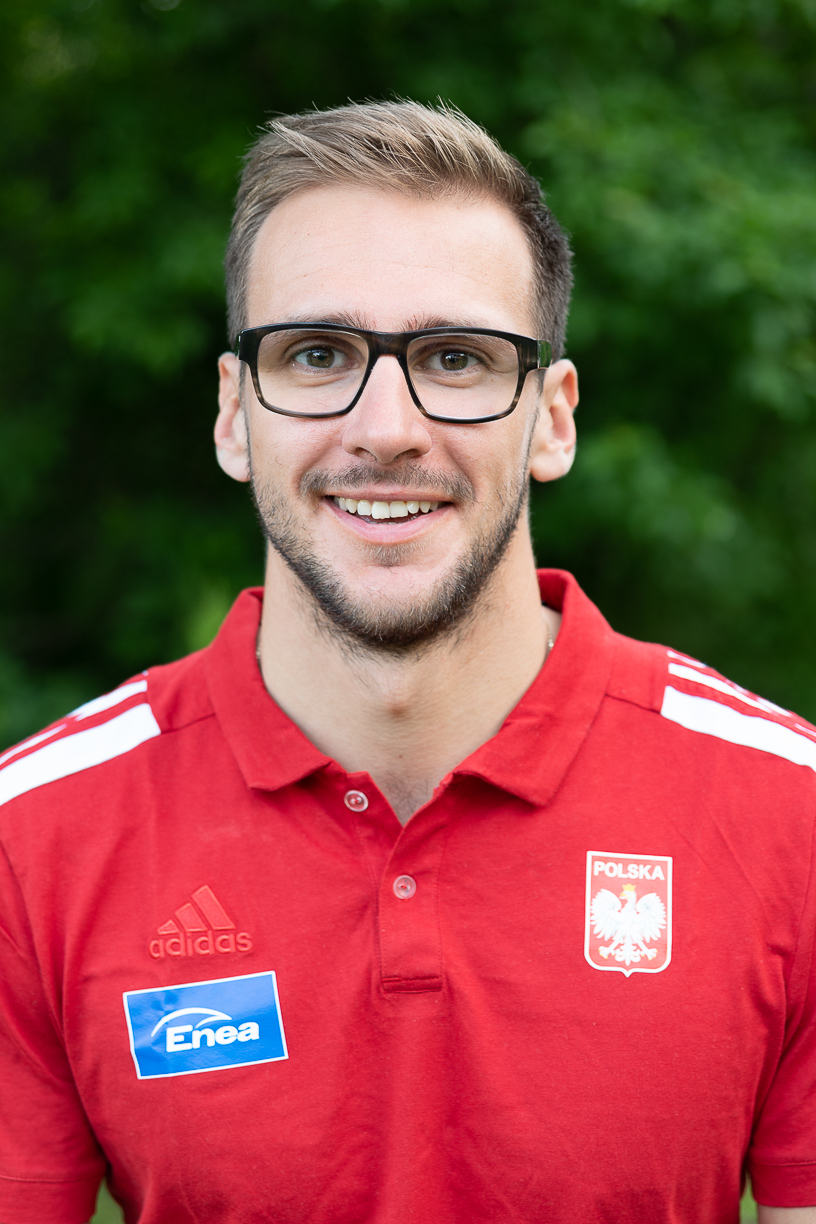
- Czaja in 2019

Personal information
- Born: 12 August 1995 (age 30) Kraków, Poland
- Height: 1.88 m (6 ft 2 in)
- Weight: 75 kg (165 lb)

Sport
- Country: Poland
- Sport: Rowing
- Events: Double sculls Quadruple sculls
- Club: AZS AWF Warsaw
Medal record
Men's rowing
Representing Poland
Olympic Games
Bronze medal – third place	2024 Paris	Quadruple sculls
World Championships
Gold medal – first place	2022 Račice	Quadruple sculls
Silver medal – second place	2019 Ottensheim	Quadruple sculls
Bronze medal – third place	2023 Belgrade	Quadruple sculls
Bronze medal – third place	2025 Shanghai	Quadruple sculls
European Championships
Gold medal – first place	2023 Bled	Quadruple sculls
Silver medal – second place	2017 Račice	Quadruple sculls
Silver medal – second place	2022 Oberschleißheim	Quadruple sculls
Silver medal – second place	2026 Varese	Quadruple sculls
Bronze medal – third place	2018 Glasgow	Quadruple sculls
Bronze medal – third place	2024 Szeged	Quadruple sculls
Bronze medal – third place	2025 Plovdiv	Quadruple sculls

Dominik Czaja (born 12 August 1995) is a Polish rower. At the 2024 Summer Olympics in Paris, he won a bronze medal in the quadruple sculls.

He won medals at the 2019, 2022, and 2023 World Rowing Championships.
