= Lennart van Lierop =

Dutch rower (born 1994)

Personal information
- Born: 20 May 1994 (age 32) The Hague

Sport
- Country: Netherlands
- Sport: Rowing
Medal record
Men's rowing
Representing NED
Olympic Games
Gold medal – first place	2024 Paris	Quadruple sculls
World Championships
Gold medal – first place	2023 Belgrade	Quadruple sculls
Silver medal – second place	2022 Račice	Eight
Silver medal – second place	2026 Amsterdam	Coxless four
Silver medal – second place	2026 Amsterdam	Mixed eight
Bronze medal – third place	2025 Shanghai	Coxless four
European Championships
Gold medal – first place	2023 Bled	Single sculls
Silver medal – second place	2022 Oberschleißheim	Eight

Lennart van Lierop (born 20 May 1994) is a Dutch rower. He won a gold medal in the quadruple sculls at the 2023 World Rowing Championships.
