= Max Appel =

German rower

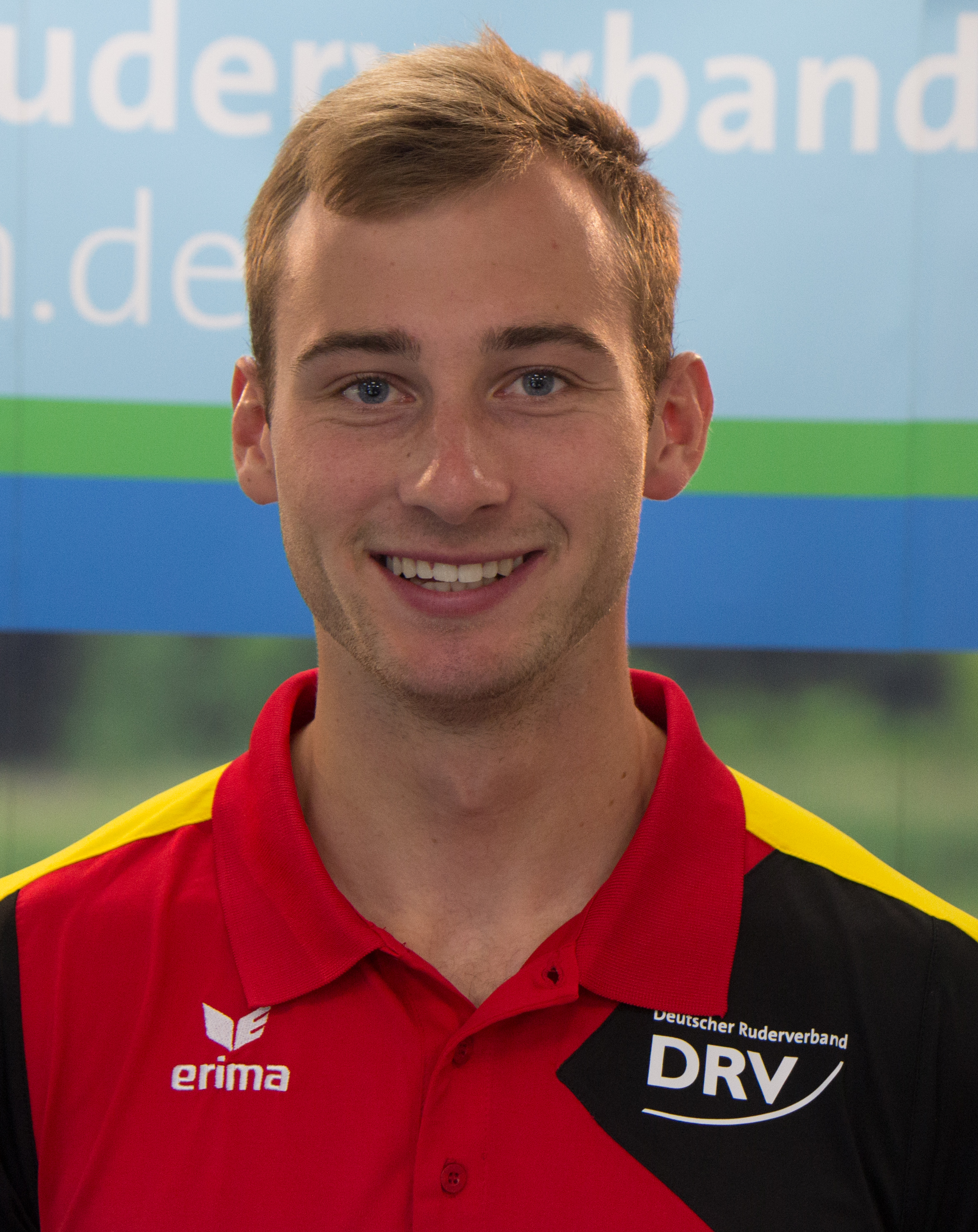
- Appel in 2017

Personal information
- Nationality: German
- Born: 19 March 1996 (age 30) Ratzeburg, Germany
- Height: 1.94 m (6 ft 4 in)

Sport
- Country: Germany
- Sport: Rowing
Medal record
Men's rowing
Representing Germany
World U23 Championships
Gold medal – first place	2016 Rotterdam	Double sculls
World Junior Championships
Gold medal – first place	2013 Trakai	Quadruple sculls
Gold medal – first place	2014 Hamburg	Double sculls

Max Appel (born 19 March 1996) is a German rower. He competed in the 2020 Summer Olympics.
