= Erik André Solbakken =

Norwegian rower

Erik Solbakken
Personal information
- Full name: Erik André Solbakken
- Nationality: Norwegian
- Born: 30 August 1994 (age 31) Fredrikstad, Norway

Sport
- Sport: Rowing
- Club: Moss Roklubb

Erik André Solbakken (born 30 August 1994) is a Norwegian competitive rower, born in Fredrikstad. He competed at the 2020 Summer Olympics in Tokyo 2021, in men's quadruple sculls.
