= George Bourne (rower) =

British rower (born 1998)

Personal information
- Born: 22 March 1998 (age 28)

Sport
- Sport: Rowing
- Club: Tideway Scullers School
Medal record
Men's rowing
Representing Great Britain
World Championships
Gold medal – first place	2025 Shanghai	Coxless four
Silver medal – second place	2022 Račice	Quadruple sculls
Bronze medal – third place	2026 Amsterdam	Coxless four

George Bourne (born 22 March 1998) is a British rower.

== Biography ==
Bourne is from Hauxton in Cambridgeshire and attended Tonbridge School. He later studied at Durham University.

At the 2022 World Rowing Championships held in Račice, Czech Republic, Bourne was part of the British crew that won the silver medal in the quadruple sculls event. He then switched to the men's single sculls at the 2024 World Rowing Championships, narrowly missing out on qualifying the boat for the Paris Olympics.

In 2025, representing Peterhouse Boat Club, he was part of the Cambridge crew that won The Boat Race 2025.
