= Florin Horodișteanu =

Romanian rower (born 1999)

Personal information
- Full name: Florin Bogdan Horodișteanu
- Nationality: Romania
- Born: 12 April 1999 (age 27) Dorohoi, Romania

Sport
- Sport: Rowing
Medal record
Men's rowing
Representing Romania
European U23 Championships
Silver medal – second place	2019 Ioannina	Coxless four

Florin Bogdan Horodișteanu (born 12 April 1999) is a Romanian rower. He competed in the 2024 Summer Olympics at men's quadruple sculls. He won a silver medal at the 2019 European Rowing U23 Championships.
