= Matt Haywood =

British rower (born 1998)

Personal information
- Full name: Matthew Haywood
- Born: 11 May 1998 (age 28)

Sport
- Sport: Rowing
- Club: Nottingham Rowing Club; Burton Leander Rowing Club
Medal record
Men's rowing
Representing Great Britain
World Championships
Silver medal – second place	2022 Račice	Quadruple sculls
Silver medal – second place	2025 Shanghai	Quadruple sculls
European Championships
Gold medal – first place	2025 Plovdiv	Quadruple sculls

Matthew Haywood (born 11 May 1998) is a British rower.

At the 2022 World Rowing Championships held in Račice, Czech Republic, Haywood was part of the British crew that won the silver medal in the quadruple sculls event. He also won a silver medal as part of the British men's quadruple sculls crew at the 2025 World Championships in Shanghai, China.

== Early life ==
Haywood is from Burton upon Trent, Staffordshire.
