= Callum Dixon (rower) =

British rower (born 2000)

Callum Dixon OLY
Personal information
- Born: 22 January 2000 (age 26) Tower Hamlets, London, England

Sport
- Country: Great Britain
- Sport: Rowing
- Events: Men's double sculls, Men’s quadruple sculls
- Club: Twickenham Rowing Club
Medal record
Men's rowing
Representing Great Britain
World Championships
Silver medal – second place	2025 Shanghai	Quadruple sculls
Bronze medal – third place	2026 Amsterdam	Quadruple sculls
European Championships
Gold medal – first place	2025 Plovdiv	Quadruple sculls
European U23 Championships
Gold medal – first place	2021 Kruszwica	Double sculls

Callum Dixon OLY (born 22 January 2000) is a British rower. He won a silver medal in the men's quadruple sculls at the 2025 World Championships and a gold medal in the same discipline at the 2025 European Rowing Championships. Dixon also competed for Great Britain in the men's quadruple sculls at the 2024 Summer Olympics.

== Biography ==
Born and raised in Tower Hamlets, Dixon has severe dyslexia which means he can only read about 25 words on a good day.

After a short stint in mainstream education, he was home-schooled alongside his three siblings and has no GCSE or A-Level qualifications, although, with help from his mother, he achieved a psychology degree from the Open University.

From a young age he took part in a variety of sports including tennis, climbing and swimming but found his main passion was sailing.

Dixon joined the British sailing team in 2016 competing in the Finn class and progressed through the age-group categories to compete on the World Cup circuit, but when it was dropped from the Olympic programme he decided to change sports to pursue his ambition of being an Olympian.

At the suggestion of Olympic sailing champion Giles Scott, whose brother Nick was British Rowing head of performance at the time, Dixon turned his hand to rowing.

He made it onto the British rowing squad, winning a gold medal at the 2021 European Rowing Under-23s in Poland in the men's double sculls with Nathan Hull.

Dixon made his Rowing World Cup debut in 2022 and was in the men's quadruple sculls boat which finished fourth at the 2023 European Rowing Championships in Slovenia, and the 2023 World Rowing Championships in Serbia although the disappointment on missing out on a medal at the latter was tempered by the fact their performance was good enough to gain qualification for the 2024 Summer Olympics.

It was fourth again for Dixon and his men's quadruple sculls teammates at the 2024 European Rowing Championships in Hungary.

In June 2024, Dixon was named in the Great Britain rowing team for that year's Summer Olympics in Paris as part of the men's quadruple sculls squad. At the Games, the crew finished second in their heat to secure a place in the final where they came fourth.

In June 2025, Dixon was a member of the first Great Britain crew to take the gold medal in the men's quadruple sculls at the European Rowing Championships in Plovdiv, Bulgaria.

He won a silver medal as part of the British men's quadruple sculls crew at the 2025 World Championships in Shanghai, China, in September 2025.

Dixon won a bronze medal as a member of the British men's quadruple sculls crew at the 2026 World Rowing Championships in Amsterdam, Netherlands.
