= Rowing at the 2024 Summer Olympics – Women's single sculls =

Women's single sculls at the Games of the XXXIII Olympiad
- Olympic rowing
- Venue: Stade nautique de Vaires-sur-Marne, National Olympic Nautical Stadium of Île-de-France, Vaires-sur-Marne
- Dates: 27 July – 3 August 2024
- Competitors: 32 from 32 nations

Medalists
1st place, gold medalist(s)		Karolien Florijn	Netherlands
2nd place, silver medalist(s)		Emma Twigg	New Zealand
3rd place, bronze medalist(s)		Viktorija Senkutė	Lithuania

The women's single sculls event at the 2024 Summer Olympics took place from 27 July to 3 August 2024 at the Stade nautique de Vaires-sur-Marne, National Olympic Nautical Stadium of Île-de-France in Vaires-sur-Marne. 32 rowers from 32 nations competed.

== Background ==
This was the 13th appearance of the event, which has been held at every Summer Olympics since 1976.

== Qualification ==
Each National Olympic Committee (NOC) has been limited to a single boat (one rower) in the event since 1976.

== Competition format ==
This rowing event is a single scull event, meaning that each boat is propelled by a single rower. The "scull" portion means that the rower uses two oars, one on each side of the boat; this contrasts with sweep rowing in which each rower has one oar and rows on only one side (not feasible for singles events). The competition consists of multiple rounds. The competition continues to use the five-round format introduced in 2012. Finals are held to determine the placing of each boat; these finals are given letters with those nearer to the beginning of the alphabet meaning a better ranking. Semifinals are named based on which finals they fed, with each semifinal having two possible finals. The course uses the 2000 metres distance that became the Olympic standard in 1912.

During the first round six heats are held. The first three boats in each heat advance to the quarterfinals, while all others are relegated to the repechages.

The repechage is a round which offers rowers a second chance to qualify for the quarterfinals. Placing in the repechage heats determines which quarterfinal the boat would race in. The top two boats in each repechage heat move on to the quarterfinals, with the remaining boats going to the E/F semifinals.

The four quarterfinals are the second round for rowers still competing for medals. Placing in the quarterfinal heats determines which semifinal the boat would race in. The top three boats in each quarterfinal move on to the A/B semifinals, with the bottom three boats going to the C/D semifinals.

Six semifinals are held, two each of A/B semifinals, C/D semifinals, and E/F semifinals. For each semifinal race, the top three boats move on to the better of the two finals, while the bottom three boats go to the lesser of the two finals possible. For example, a second-place finish in an A/B semifinal would result in advancement to the A final.

The fifth and final round is the finals. Each final determines a set of rankings. The A final determines the medals, along with the rest of the places through 6th. The B final gives rankings from 7th to 12th, the C from 13th to 18th, and so on. Thus, to win a medal rowers have to finish in the top three of their heat (or top two of their repechage heat), top three of their quarterfinal, and top three of their A/B semifinal to reach the A final.

== Schedule ==
The competition was held over eight days. Times given are session start times; multiple rowing events might have races during a session.

All times are Central European Summer Time (UTC+2)

Date	Time	Round
Saturday, 27 July 2024	10:12	Heats
Sunday, 28 July 2024	9:00	Repechage
Monday, 29 July 2024	9:54	Semifinals E/F
Tuesday, 30 July 2024	9:30	Quarterfinals
Wednesday, 31 July 2024	10:14	Semifinals C/D
Thursday, 1 August 2024	9:30	Semifinals A/B
Friday, 2 August 2024	9:42	Final F
Friday, 2 August 2024	10:06	Final E
Friday, 2 August 2024	10:30	Final D
Saturday, 3 August 2024	9:30	Final C
Saturday, 3 August 2024	9:54	Final B
Saturday, 3 August 2024	10:18	Final A

== Results ==
=== Heats ===
The first three of each heat qualify for the quarterfinals, while the remainder go to the repechage.

==== Heat 1 ====
Rank	Lane	Rower	Nation	Time	Notes
1	5	Tara Rigney	Australia	7:30.71	Q
2	3	Virginia Díaz Rivas	Spain	7:37.30	Q
3	2	Paige Badenhorst	South Africa	7:39.19	Q
4	4	Fatemeh Mojallal	Iran	8:01.30	R
5	1	Kathleen Noble	Uganda	8:08.90	R
6	6	Evidelia González	Nicaragua	8:23.25	R

==== Heat 2 ====
Rank	Lane	Rower	Nation	Time	Notes
1	3	Karolien Florijn	Netherlands	7:36.90	Q
2	4	Aurelia-Maxima Katharina Janzen	Switzerland	7:41.15	Q
3	1	Nina Kostanjšek	Slovenia	7:46.30	Q
4	5	Joanie Delgaco	Philippines	7:56.26	R
5	2	Nihed Benchadli	Algeria	8:06.62	R
6	6	Majdouline El Allaoui	Morocco	8:30.47	R

==== Heat 3 ====
Rank	Lane	Rower	Nation	Time	Notes
1	3	Emma Twigg	New Zealand	7:34.97	Q
2	4	Hanna Prakatsen	Uzbekistan	7:37.80	Q
3	2	Kenia Lechuga	Mexico	7:46.11	Q
4	1	Alejandra Alonso	Paraguay	7:52.44	R
5	5	Yariulvis Cobas	Cuba	8:11.13	R

==== Heat 4 ====
Rank	Lane	Rower	Nation	Time	Notes
1	2	Viktorija Senkutė	Lithuania	7:30.01	Q
2	5	Tatsiana Klimovich	Individual Neutral Athletes	7:34.31	Q
3	3	Beatriz Tavares	Brazil	7:49.66	Q
4	4	Elis Özbay	Turkey	7:57.06	R
5	1	Adriana Sanguineti	Peru	8:03.87	R

==== Heat 5 ====
Rank	Lane	Rower	Nation	Time	Notes
1	3	Alexandra Föster	Germany	7:36.35	Q
2	1	Desislava Angelova	Bulgaria	7:42.73	Q
3	5	Diana Dymchenko	Azerbaijan	7:52.53	Q
4	2	Phạm Thị Huệ	Vietnam	8:03.84	R
5	4	Saiyidah Aisyah	Singapore	8:17.04	R

==== Heat 6 ====
Rank	Lane	Rower	Nation	Time	Notes
1	2	Kara Kohler	United States	7:32.46	Q
2	5	Magdalena Lobnig	Austria	7:39.39	Q
3	3	Jovana Arsić	Serbia	7:52.53	Q
4	1	Suad Al-Faqaan	Kuwait	8:16.32	R
5	4	Akoko Komlanvi	Togo	8:44.88	R

=== Repechage ===
The first two in each heat qualify for the quarterfinals; the rest go to Semifinals E/F (out of medal contention).

==== Repechage heat 1 ====
Rank	Lane	Rower	Nation	Time	Notes
1	3	Joanie Delgaco	Philippines	7:55.00	Q
2	4	Phạm Thị Huệ	Vietnam	8:00.97	Q
3	2	Yariulvis Cobas	Cuba	8:10.64	E/F
4	1	Evidelia González	Nicaragua	8:26.23	E/F
5	5	Akoko Komlanvi	Togo	8:43.11	E/F

==== Repechage heat 2 ====
Rank	Lane	Rower	Nation	Time	Notes
1	2	Fatemeh Mojallal	Iran	7:56.48	Q
2	3	Elis Özbay	Turkey	8:00.00	Q
3	4	Nihed Benchadli	Algeria	8:10.34	E/F
4	1	Saiyidah Aisyah	Singapore	8:23.03	E/F

==== Repechage heat 3 ====
Rank	Lane	Rower	Nation	Time	Notes
1	2	Alejandra Alonso	Paraguay	7:57.14	Q
2	4	Adriana Sanguineti	Peru	8:07.05	Q
3	1	Kathleen Noble	Uganda	8:15.10	E/F
4	5	Suad Al-Faqaan	Kuwait	8:28.89	E/F
5	3	Majdouline El Allaoui	Morocco	8:42.07	E/F

=== Quarterfinals ===
The first three of each heat qualify to the semifinals A/B, remaining Crews to Semifinal C/D

==== Quarterfinal 1 ====
Rank	Lane	Rower	Nation	Time	Notes
1	4	Tara Rigney	Australia	7:30.57	QAB
2	3	Kara Kohler	United States	7:34.96	QAB
3	5	Desislava Angelova	Bulgaria	7:41.25	QAB
4	2	Beatriz Tavares	Brazil	7:47.29	QCD
5	1	Adriana Sanguineti	Peru	7:57.84	QCD
6	6	Fatemeh Mojallal	Iran	8:00.37	QCD

==== Quarterfinal 2 ====
Rank	Lane	Rower	Nation	Time	Notes
1	3	Karolien Florijn	Netherlands	7:29.07	QAB
2	4	Alexandra Föster	Germany	7:30.98	QAB
3	5	Tatsiana Klimovich	Individual Neutral Athletes	7:34.30	QAB
4	6	Alejandra Alonso	Paraguay	7:47.40	QCD
5	2	Kenia Lechuga	Mexico	7:50.35	QCD
6	1	Phạm Thị Huệ	Vietnam	7:56.96	QCD

==== Quarterfinal 3 ====
Rank	Lane	Rower	Nation	Time	Notes
1	3	Emma Twigg	New Zealand	7:26.89	QAB
2	2	Aurelia-Maxima Katharina Janzen	Switzerland	7:31.12	QAB
3	4	Virginia Díaz Rivas	Spain	7:34.01	QAB
4	1	Diana Dymchenko	Azerbaijan	7:53.76	QCD
5	5	Jovana Arsić	Serbia	7:56.18	QCD
6	6	Joanie Delgaco	Philippines	7:58.30	QCD

==== Quarterfinal 4 ====
Rank	Lane	Rower	Nation	Time	Notes
1	3	Viktorija Senkutė	Lithuania	7:33.35	QAB
2	4	Hanna Prakatsen	Uzbekistan	7:35.91	QAB
3	2	Magdalena Lobnig	Austria	7:40.07	QAB
4	5	Paige Badenhorst	South Africa	7:44.03	QCD
5	1	Nina Kostanjšek	Slovenia	7:56.31	QCD
6	6	Elis Özbay	Turkey	7:56.51	QCD

=== Semifinals ===
The first three of each heat qualify to the better final (E, C, A) while the remainder go to the lower final (F, D, B).

==== Semifinal A/B 1 ====
Rank	Lane	Rower	Nation	Time	Notes
1	3	Karolien Florijn	Netherlands	7:21.26	FA
2	4	Tara Rigney	Australia	7:23.58	FA
3	6	Desislava Angelova	Bulgaria	7:27.16	FA
4	2	Hanna Prakatsen	Uzbekistan	7:29.28	FB
5	5	Aurelia-Maxima Katharina Janzen	Switzerland	7:31.65	FB
6	1	Virginia Díaz Rivas	Spain	7:37.52	FB

==== Semifinal A/B 2 ====
Rank	Lane	Rower	Nation	Time	Notes
1	3	Emma Twigg	New Zealand	7:17.19	FA
2	4	Viktorija Senkutė	Lithuania	7:19.15	FA
3	2	Kara Kohler	United States	7:22.33	FA
4	5	Alexandra Föster	Germany	7:24.63	FB
5	1	Tatsiana Klimovich	Individual Neutral Athletes	7:26.56	FB
6	6	Magdalena Lobnig	Austria	7:40.02	FB

==== Semifinal C/D 1 ====
Rank	Lane	Rower	Nation	Time	Notes
1	2	Jovana Arsić	Serbia	7:44.60	FC
2	5	Nina Kostanjšek	Slovenia	7:48.86	FC
3	3	Beatriz Tavares	Brazil	7:49.96	FC
4	4	Alejandra Alonso	Paraguay	7:56.50	FD
5	1	Joanie Delgaco	Philippines	8:00.18	FD
6	6	Fatemeh Mojallal	Iran	8:06.23	FD

==== Semifinal C/D 2 ====
Rank	Lane	Rower	Nation	Time	Notes
1	3	Paige Badenhorst	South Africa	7:55.91	FC
2	5	Kenia Lechuga	Mexico	7:58.00	FC
3	4	Diana Dymchenko	Azerbaijan	7:59.23	FC
4	6	Elis Özbay	Turkey	8:02.47	FD
5	2	Adriana Sanguineti	Peru	8:17.84	FD
6	1	Phạm Thị Huệ	Vietnam	8:22.85	FD

==== Semifinal E/F 1 ====
Rank	Lane	Rower	Nation	Time	Notes
1	2	Yariulvis Cobas	Cuba	8:36.16	FE
2	3	Saiyidah Aisyah	Singapore	8:47.41	FE
3	1	Suad Al-Faqaan	Kuwait	9:01.78	FE
4	4	Akoko Komlanvi	Togo	9:16.28	FF

==== Semifinal E/F 2 ====
Rank	Lane	Rower	Nation	Time	Notes
1	1	Nihed Benchadli	Algeria	8:34.67	FE
2	2	Kathleen Noble	Uganda	8:38.70	FE
3	3	Evidelia González	Nicaragua	8:43.78	FE
4	4	Majdouline El Allaoui	Morocco	8:49.70	FF

=== Finals ===
==== Final F ====
Rank	Lane	Rower	Nation	Time	Notes
31	2	Majdouline El Allaoui	Morocco	8:20.81	
32	1	Akoko Komlanvi	Togo	8:46.73	

==== Final E ====
Rank	Lane	Rower	Nation	Time	Notes
25	4	Nihed Benchadli	Algeria	7:54.25	
26	2	Kathleen Noble	Uganda	7:56.10	
27	3	Yariulvis Cobas	Cuba	7:57.99	
28	5	Saiyidah Aisyah	Singapore	8:03.29	
29	6	Suad Al-Faqaan	Kuwait	8:05.18	
30	1	Evidelia González	Nicaragua	8:08.61	

==== Final D ====
Rank	Lane	Rower	Nation	Time	Notes
19	4	Alejandra Alonso	Paraguay	7:42.09	
20	2	Joanie Delgaco	Philippines	7:43.83	
21	1	Fatemeh Mojallal	Iran	7:46.08	
22	3	Elis Özbay	Turkey	7:46.95	
23	6	Phạm Thị Huệ	Vietnam	7:47.84	
24	5	Adriana Sanguineti	Peru	7:49.31	

==== Final C ====
Rank	Lane	Rower	Nation	Time	Notes
13	4	Jovana Arsić	Serbia	7:26.09	
14	3	Paige Badenhorst	South Africa	7:27.76	
15	6	Beatriz Tavares	Brazil	7:31.31	
16	2	Kenia Lechuga	Mexico	7:31.99	
17	1	Diana Dymchenko	Azerbaijan	7:35.19	
18	5	Nina Kostanjšek	Slovenia	7:39.00	

==== Final B ====
Rank	Lane	Rower	Nation	Time	Notes
7	3	Alexandra Föster	Germany	7:23.53	
8	5	Tatsiana Klimovich	Individual Neutral Athletes	7:25.61	
9	2	Aurelia-Maxima Katharina Janzen	Switzerland	7:27.01	
10	1	Magdalena Lobnig	Austria	7:30.54	
11	4	Hanna Prakatsen	Uzbekistan	7:33.57	
12	6	Virginia Díaz Rivas	Spain	7:34.61	

==== Final A ====
Rank	Lane	Rower	Nation	Time	Notes
1st place, gold medalist(s)	3	Karolien Florijn	Netherlands	7:17.28	
2nd place, silver medalist(s)	4	Emma Twigg	New Zealand	7:19.14	
3rd place, bronze medalist(s)	5	Viktorija Senkutė	Lithuania	7:20.85	
4	2	Tara Rigney	Australia	7:21.38	
5	6	Kara Kohler	United States	7:25.07	
6	1	Desislava Angelova	Bulgaria	7:33.19	
