= 2023 World Rowing Championships – Women's single sculls =

Women's single sculls at the 2023 World Rowing Championships
- Venue: Lake Sava
- Location: Belgrade, Serbia
- Dates: 3 September – 10 September
- Competitors: 31 from 31 nations
- Winning time: 7:14.35

Medalists
gold medal	Karolien Florijn	Netherlands
silver medal	Emma Twigg	New Zealand
bronze medal	Tara Rigney	Australia

The women's single sculls competition at the 2023 World Rowing Championships took place at Lake Sava, in Belgrade.

== Schedule ==
The schedule was as follows:

Date	Time	Round
Sunday 3 September 2023	10:26	Heats
Monday 4 September 2023	16:26	Repechages
Wednesday 6 September 2023	11:54	Quarterfinals AD
Wednesday 6 September 2023	15:58	Semifinals E/F
Thursday 7 September 2023	15:55	Semifinals C/D
Thursday 7 September 2023	17:30	Final F
Thursday 7 September 2023	17:40	Final E
Friday 8 September 2023	10:15	Semifinals A/B
Sunday 10 September 2023	09:47	Final D
Sunday 10 September 2023	10:25	Final C
Sunday 10 September 2023	11:23	Final B
Sunday 10 September 2023	14:44	Final A

All times are Central European Summer Time (UTC+2)

== Results ==
=== Heats ===
The three fastest boats in each heat advanced directly to the quarterfinals. The remaining boats were sent to the repechages.

==== Heat 1 ====
Rank	Rower	Country	Time	Notes
1	Alexandra Föster	Germany	7:23.31	QAD
2	Virginia Díaz Rivas	Spain	7:25.48	QAD
3	Clara Guerra	Italy	7:26.01	QAD
4	Anna Prakaten	Uzbekistan	7:28.76	R
5	Elis Özbay	Turkey	7:33.03	R
6	Alia Qali	Kuwait	9:19.93	R

==== Heat 2 ====
Rank	Rower	Country	Time	Notes
1	Emma Twigg	New Zealand	7:23.43	QAD
2	Liu Ruiqi	China	7:26.62	QAD
3	Inger Seim Kavlie	Norway	7:28.26	QAD
4	Marta Wieliczko	Poland	7:33.43	R
5	Kira Yuvchenko	Individual Neutral Athletes	7:33.54	R

==== Heat 3 ====
Rank	Rower	Country	Time	Notes
1	Tara Rigney	Australia	7:21.90	QAD
2	Viktorija Senkutė	Lithuania	7:24.08	QAD
3	Marie Jacquet	France	7:28.57	QAD
4	Akoko Komlanvi	Togo	8:28.48	R
5	Maryam Isa	Bahrain	11:17.51	R

==== Heat 4 ====
Rank	Rower	Country	Time	Notes
1	Desislava Angelova	Bulgaria	7:24.96	QAD
2	Magdalena Lobnig	Austria	7:25.53	QAD
3	Ioana-Madalina Morosan	Romania	7:29.86	QAD
4	Lucy Glover	Great Britain	7:37.14	R
5	Laine Rumpe	Latvia	7:54.95	R

==== Heat 5 ====
Rank	Rower	Country	Time	Notes
1	Kara Kohler	United States	7:24.88	QAD
2	Tatsiana Klimovich	Individual Neutral Athletes	7:28.92	QAD
3	Aurelia-Maxima Janzen	Switzerland	7:39.31	QAD
4	Nina Kostanjšek	Slovenia	7:45.60	R
5	Adriana Sanguineti Velasco	Peru	7:50.72	R

==== Heat 6 ====
Rank	Rower	Country	Time	Notes
1	Karolien Florijn	Netherlands	7:18.55	QAD
2	Jovana Arsić	Serbia	7:23.33	QAD
3	Diana Serebrianska	Ukraine	7:32.55	QAD
4	Lenka Lukšová	Czech Republic	7:38.84	R
5	Shiho Yonekawa	Japan	7:39.59	R

=== Repechages ===
The two fastest boats in each heat advanced to the quarterfinals. The remaining boats were sent to the EF semifinals.

==== Repechage 1 ====
Rank	Rower	Country	Time	Notes
1	Anna Prakaten	Uzbekistan	8:05.40	Q
2	Lenka Lukšová	Czech Republic	8:15.16	Q
3	Adriana Sanguineti Velasco	Peru	8:32.42	SEF
4	Maryam Isa	Bahrain	12:08.94	SEF

==== Repechage 2 ====
Rank	Rower	Country	Time	Notes
1	Shiho Yonekawa	Japan	8:14.11	Q
2	Lucy Glover	Great Britain	8:14.77	Q
3	Elis Özbay	Turkey	8:21.51	SEF
4	Marta Wieliczko	Poland	8:24.55	SEF

==== Repechage 3 ====
Rank	Rower	Country	Time	Notes
1	Kira Yuvchenko	Individual Neutral Athletes	8:23.44	Q
2	Nina Kostanjšek	Slovenia	8:35.73	Q
3	Laine Rumpe	Latvia	8:48.83	SEF
4	Akoko Komlanvi	Togo	9:17.09	SEF
5	Alia Qali	Kuwait	10:20.69	SEF

=== Quarterfinals ===
The three fastest boats in each Quarterfinal advanced to the AB semifinals. The remaining boats were sent to the CD semifinals.

==== Quarterfinal 1 ====
Rank	Rower	Country	Time	Notes
1	Emma Twigg	New Zealand	7:52.44	SA/B
2	Viktorija Senkutė	Lithuania	7:57.48	SA/B
3	Alexandra Föster	Germany	7:58.16	SA/B
4	Anna Prakaten	Uzbekistan	8:07.24	SC/D
5	Diana Serebrianska	Ukraine	8:12.99	SC/D
6	Nina Kostanjšek	Slovenia	8:40.79	SC/D

==== Quarterfinal 2 ====
Rank	Rower	Country	Time	Notes
1	Tara Rigney	Australia	7:56.73	SA/B
2	Desislava Angelova	Bulgaria	7:58.68	SA/B
3	Tatsiana Klimovich	Individual Neutral Athletes	7:59.85	SA/B
4	Kira Yuvchenko	Individual Neutral Athletes	8:07.35	SC/D
5	Ioana-Madalina Morosan	Romania	8:10.50	SC/D
6	Lucy Glover	Great Britain	8:15.65	SC/D

==== Quarterfinal 3 ====
Rank	Rower	Country	Time	Notes
1	Kara Kohler	United States	7:52.41	SA/B
2	Jovana Arsić	Serbia	7:56.23	SA/B
3	Virginia Díaz Rivas	Spain	7:59.32	SA/B
4	Inger Seim Kavlie	Norway	8:01.25	SC/D
5	Marie Jacquet	France	8:08.44	SC/D
6	Shiho Yonekawa	Japan	8:11.76	SC/D

==== Quarterfinal 4 ====
Rank	Rower	Country	Time	Notes
1	Karolien Florijn	Netherlands	7:53.39	SA/B
2	Magdalena Lobnig	Austria	7:55.93	SA/B
3	Aurelia-Maxima Janzen	Switzerland	7:57.38	SA/B
4	Liu Ruiqi	China	8:03.70	SC/D
5	Lenka Lukšová	Czech Republic	8:12.49	SC/D
6	Clara Guerra	Italy	8:16.15	SC/D

=== Semifinals E/F ===
The two fastest boats in each Semifinal advanced to the Final E. The remaining boats were sent to the Final F.

==== Semifinal 1 ====
Rank	Rower	Country	Time	Notes
1	Marta Wieliczko	Poland	8:40.11	FE
2	Adriana Sanguineti Velasco	Peru	8:59.64	FE
3	Laine Rumpe	Latvia	9:15.88	FE
4	Alia Qali	Kuwait	10:48.80	FF

==== Semifinal 2 ====
Rank	Rower	Country	Time	Notes
1	Elis Özbay	Turkey	8:45.53	FE
2	Akoko Komlanvi	Togo	9:41.70	FE
3	Maryam Isa	Bahrain	13:17.30	FF

=== Semifinals C/D ===
The three fastest boats in each Semifinal advanced to the Final C. The remaining boats were sent to the Final D.

==== Semifinal 1 ====
Rank	Rower	Country	Time	Notes
1	Anna Prakaten	Uzbekistan	8:16.44	FC
2	Shiho Yonekawa	Japan	8:18.83	FC
3	Kira Yuvchenko	Individual Neutral Athletes	8:18.92	FC
4	Marie Jacquet	France	8:20.62	FD
5	Lenka Lukšová	Czech Republic	8:36.23	FD
6	Nina Kostanjšek	Slovenia	8:46.17	FD

==== Semifinal 2 ====
Rank	Rower	Country	Time	Notes
1	Liu Ruiqi	China	8:17.68	FC
2	Inger Seim Kavlie	Norway	8:18.83	FC
3	Ioana-Madalina Morosan	Romania	8:24.33	FC
4	Clara Guerra	Italy	8:29.19	FD
5	Diana Serebrianska	Ukraine	8:33.58	FD
6	Lucy Glover	Great Britain	8:33.93	FD

=== Semifinals A/B ===
The three fastest boats in each semifinal advanced to the A final. The remaining boats were sent to the B final.

==== Semifinal 1 ====
Rank	Rower	Country	Time	Notes
1	Karolien Florijn	Netherlands	7:29.07	FA
2	Emma Twigg	New Zealand	7:33.92	FA
3	Desislava Angelova	Bulgaria	7:42.45	FA
4	Alexandra Föster	Germany	7:58.35	FB
5	Jovana Arsić	Serbia	8:07.33	FB
6	Virginia Díaz Rivas	Spain	8:16.30	FB

==== Semifinal 2 ====
Rank	Rower	Country	Time	Notes
1	Kara Kohler	United States	7:44.66	FA
2	Tara Rigney	Australia	7:46.42	FA
3	Viktorija Senkutėa	Lithuania	7:46.81	FA
4	Magdalena Lobnig	Austria	7:54.45	FB
5	Aurelia-Maxima Janzen	Switzerland	8:02.82	FB
6	Tatsiana Klimovich	Individual Neutral Athletes	8:07.45	FB

=== Finals ===
The A final determined the rankings for places 1 to 6. Additional rankings were determined in the other finals.

==== Final F ====
Rank	Rower	Country	Time	Total rank
1	Alia Qali	Kuwait	9:53.90	30
2	Maryam Isa	Bahrain	11:21.79	31

==== Final E ====
Rank	Rower	Country	Time	Total rank
1	Marta Wieliczko	Poland	7:59.56	25
2	Elis Özbay	Turkey	8:05.89	26
3	Laine Rumpe	Latvia	8:25.28	27
4	Adriana Sanguineti Velasco	Peru	8:35.42	28
5	Akoko Komlanvi	Togo	9:12.87	29

==== Final D ====
Rank	Rower	Country	Time	Total rank
1	Marie Jacquet	France	7:27.21	19
2	Clara Guerra	Italy	7:28.15	20
3	Lenka Lukšová	Czech Republic	7:37.04	21
4	Lucy Glover	Great Britain	7:37.93	22
5	Diana Serebrianska	Ukraine	7:40.42	23
6	Nina Kostanjšek	Slovenia	7:46.40	24

==== Final C ====
Rank	Rower	Country	Time	Total rank
1	Inger Seim Kavlie	Norway	7:32.72	13
2	Liu Ruiqi	China	7:33.57	14
3	Anna Prakaten	Uzbekistan	7:36.36	15
4	Shiho Yonekawa	Japan	7:38.42	16
5	Kira Yuvchenko	Individual Neutral Athletes	7:44.85	17
6	Ioana-Madalina Morosan	Romania	7:50.22	18

==== Final B ====
Rank	Rower	Country	Time	Total rank
1	Magdalena Lobnig	Austria	7:31.91	7
2	Alexandra Föster	Germany	7:32.44	8
3	Jovana Arsić	Serbia	7:34.76	9
4	Tatsiana Klimovich	Individual Neutral Athletes	7:40.42	10
5	Aurelia-Maxima Janzen	Switzerland	7:43.31	11
6	Virginia Díaz Rivas	Spain	7:45.74	12

==== Final A ====
Rank	Rower	Country	Time
1st place, gold medalist(s)	Karolien Florijn	Netherlands	7:14.35
2nd place, silver medalist(s)	Emma Twigg	New Zealand	7:19.43
3rd place, bronze medalist(s)	Tara Rigney	Australia	7:21.07
4	Kara Kohler	United States	7:23.98
5	Desislava Angelova	Bulgaria	7:24.08
6	Viktorija Senkutė	Lithuania	7:35.20
