= 2022 World Rowing Championships – Women's single sculls =

Women's single sculls at the 2022 World Rowing Championships
- Venue: Labe aréna
- Location: Račice, Czech Republic
- Dates: 18 September – 25 September
- Competitors: 23 from 23 nations
- Teams: 7:31.66

Medalists
gold medal	Karolien Florijn	Netherlands
silver medal	Emma Twigg	New Zealand
bronze medal	Tara Rigney	Australia

The women's single sculls competition at the 2022 World Rowing Championships took place at the Račice regatta venue.

== Schedule ==
The schedule was as follows:

Date	Time	Round
Sunday 18 September 2022	10:12	Heats
Monday 19 September 2022	15:51	Repechages
Thursday 22 September 2022	15:30	Semifinals C/D
Friday 23 September 2022	11:36	Semifinals A/B
Sunday 25 September 2022	10:48	Final D
Sunday 25 September 2022	11:24	Final C
Sunday 25 September 2022	12:20	Final B
Sunday 25 September 2022	14:25	Final A

All times are Central European Summer Time (UTC+2)

== Results ==
=== Heats ===
The fastest boats in each heat advanced directly to the AB semifinals. The remaining boats were sent to the repechages.

==== Heat 1 ====
Rank	Rower	Country	Time	Notes
1	Tara Rigney	Australia	7:30.16	SAB
2	Virginia Díaz Rivas	Spain	7:34.33	R
3	Lu Shiyu	China	7:35.16	R
4	Siri Eva Kristiansen	Norway	7:45.59	R
5	Mahsa Javar	Iran	7:51.73	R
6	Ghada Ibrahim	Egypt	8:35.03	R

==== Heat 2 ====
Rank	Rower	Country	Time	Notes
1	Karolien Florijn	Netherlands	7:31.82	SAB
2	Kara Kohler	United States	7:35.17	R
3	Jovana Arsić	Serbia	7:39.86	R
4	Shiho Yonekawa	Japan	7:47.42	R
5	Shannon Kennedy	Canada	7:58.38	R
6	Nina Kostanjšek	Slovenia	8:04.60	R

==== Heat 3 ====
Rank	Rower	Country	Time	Notes
1	Alexandra Föster	Germany	7:33.44	SAB
2	Emma Lunatti	France	7:36.15	R
3	Jeannine Gmelin	Switzerland	7:39.00	R
4	Alison Bergin	Ireland	7:48.85	R
5	Tabea Minichmayr	Austria	8:02.92	R
	Huang Yi-ting	Chinese Taipei	DNS	R

==== Heat 4 ====
Rank	Rower	Country	Time	Notes
1	Emma Twigg	New Zealand	7:31.92	SAB
2	Hannah Scott	Great Britain	7:39.22	R
3	Desislava Angelova	Bulgaria	7:42.41	R
4	Lenka Antošová	Czech Republic	7:44.66	R
5	Svetlana Germanovich	Kazakhstan	8:20.76	R

=== Repechages ===
The two fastest boats in each repechage advanced to the AB semifinals. The remaining boats were sent to the CD semifinals.

==== Repechage 1 ====
Rank	Rower	Country	Time	Notes
1	Virginia Díaz Rivas	Spain	7:34.21	SAB
2	Jovana Arsić	Serbia	7:35.97	SAB
3	Alison Bergin	Ireland	7:38.99	SCD
4	Ghada Ibrahim	Egypt	8:01.95	SCD
5	Svetlana Germanovich	Kazakhstan	8:12.35	SCD

==== Repechage 2 ====
Rank	Rower	Country	Time	Notes
1	Lenka Antošová	Czech Republic	7:31.01	SAB
2	Jeannine Gmelin	Switzerland	7:31.21	SAB
3	Kara Kohler	United States	7:32.97	SCD
4	Mahsa Javar	Iran	7:47.89	SCD
5	Nina Kostanjšek	Slovenia	7:49.67	SCD

==== Repechage 3 ====
Rank	Rower	Country	Time	Notes
1	Emma Lunatti	France	7:32.85	SAB
2	Desislava Angelova	Bulgaria	7:35.39	SAB
3	Siri Eva Kristiansen	Norway	7:38.92	SCD
4	Shannon Kennedy	Canada	7:53.42	SCD

==== Repechage 4 ====
Rank	Rower	Country	Time	Notes
1	Lu Shiyu	China	7:36.79	SAB
2	Hannah Scott	Great Britain	7:38.89	SAB
3	Shiho Yonekawa	Japan	7:53.29	SCD
4	Tabea Minichmayr	Austria	8:01.11	SCD

=== Semifinals C/D ===
The three fastest boats in each semi advanced to the C final. The remaining boats were sent to the D final.

==== Semifinal 1 ====
Rank	Rower	Country	Time	Notes
1	Alison Bergin	Ireland	8:02.94	FC
2	Shiho Yonekawa	Japan	8:05.63	FC
3	Shannon Kennedy	Canada	8:07.07	FC
4	Mahsa Javar	Iran	8:10.86	FD
5	Svetlana Germanovich	Kazakhstan	8:38.65	FD

==== Semifinal 2 ====
Rank	Rower	Country	Time	Notes
1	Kara Kohler	United States	7:57.09	FC
2	Siri Eva Kristiansen	Norway	8:01.00	FC
3	Nina Kostanjšek	Slovenia	8:04.01	FC
4	Tabea Minichmayr	Austria	8:09.34	FD
5	Ghada Ibrahim	Egypt	8:24.07	FD

=== Semifinals A/B ===
The three fastest boats in each semi advanced to the A final. The remaining boats were sent to the B final.

==== Semifinal 1 ====
Rank	Rower	Country	Time	Notes
1	Karolien Florijn	Netherlands	7:26.68	FA
2	Tara Rigney	Australia	7:29.34	FA
3	Lu Shiyu	China	7:29.62	FA
4	Jeannine Gmelin	Switzerland	7:32.34	FB
5	Emma Lunatti	France	7:39.86	FB
6	Jovana Arsić	Serbia	7:50.93	FB

==== Semifinal 2 ====
Rank	Rower	Country	Time	Notes
1	Emma Twigg	New Zealand	7:27.96	FA
2	Virginia Díaz Rivas	Spain	7:32.09	FA
3	Hannah Scott	Great Britain	7:32.32	FA
4	Alexandra Föster	Germany	7:33.07	FB
5	Lenka Antošová	Czech Republic	7:34.70	FB
6	Desislava Angelova	Bulgaria	7:43.99	FB

=== Finals ===
The A final determined the rankings for places 1 to 6. Additional rankings were determined in the other finals

==== Final D ====
Rank	Rower	Country	Time	Total rank
1	Mahsa Javar	Iran	8:01.58	19
2	Tabea Minichmayr	Austria	8:10.80	20
3	Svetlana Germanovich	Kazakhstan	8:12.09	21
	Ghada Ibrahim	Egypt	DNF	22

==== Final C ====
Rank	Rower	Country	Time	Total rank
1	Kara Kohler	United States	7:43.01	13
2	Siri Eva Kristiansen	Norway	7:44.26	14
3	Shiho Yonekawa	Japan	7:48.13	15
4	Shannon Kennedy	Canada	7:50.18	16
5	Alison Bergin	Ireland	7:55.06	17
6	Nina Kostanjšek	Slovenia	7:59.38	18

==== Final B ====
Rank	Rower	Country	Time	Total rank
1	Alexandra Föster	Germany	7:35.99	7
2	Jeannine Gmelin	Switzerland	7:38.29	8
3	Emma Lunatti	France	7:40.75	9
4	Jovana Arsić	Serbia	7:42.28	10
5	Lenka Antošová	Czech Republic	7:42.80	11
6	Desislava Angelova	Bulgaria	7:43.62	12

==== Final A ====
Rank	Rower	Country	Time	Notes
1st place, gold medalist(s)	Karolien Florijn	Netherlands	7:31.66	
2nd place, silver medalist(s)	Emma Twigg	New Zealand	7:34.03	
3rd place, bronze medalist(s)	Tara Rigney	Australia	7:36.96	
4	Lu Shiyu	China	7:37.93	
5	Hannah Scott	Great Britain	7:41.90	
6	Virginia Díaz Rivas	Spain	7:44.46	
