= 2026 World Rowing Championships – Women's single sculls =

Women's single sculls at the 2026 World Rowing Championships
- Venue: Bosbaan
- Location: Amsterdam, Netherlands
- Dates: 26–30 August
- Competitors: 26 from 26 nations
- Winning time: 7:15.93

Medalists
gold medal	Lauren Henry	Great Britain
silver medal	Fiona Murtagh	Ireland
bronze medal	Karolien Florijn	Netherlands

The women's single sculls competition at the 2026 World Rowing Championships took place at Bosbaan, in Amsterdam.

== Schedule ==
The schedule was as follows:

Date	Time	Round
Wednesday 26 August 2026	14:16	Heats
Friday 28 August 2026	14:05	Quarterfinals
Friday 28 August 2026	15:21	Final E
Saturday 29 August 2026	11:05	Final D
Saturday 29 August 2026	11:15	Final C
Saturday 29 August 2026	16:05	Semifinals
Sunday, 30 August 2026	14:10	Final B
Sunday, 30 August 2026	14:52	Final A

All times are Central European Summer Time (UTC+2)

== Results ==
=== Heats ===
The two fastest boats in each heat and the fourteen fastest times advanced directly to the quarterfinals. The remaining boats were sent to the Final E.

==== Heat 1 ====
Rank	Rower	Country	Time	Notes
1	Frida Sanggaard Nielsen	Denmark	8:02.81	QF
2	Kateryna Dudchenko	Ukraine	8:03.23	QF
3	Tara Rigney	Australia	8:10.59	QF
4	Bianca-Camelia Ifteni	Romania	8:13.74	QF
5	Kathryn Glen	New Zealand	8:21.48	QF
6	Sophie Souwer	Italy	8:21.69	QF

==== Heat 2 ====
Rank	Rower	Country	Time	Notes
1	Karolien Florijn	Netherlands	8:10.56	QF
2	Jovana Arsić	Serbia	8:14.63	QF
3	Zoltana Gadanyi	Hungary	8:37.17	QF
4	Maiju Kainlauri	Finland	8:40.80	Q
5	Mae Tasha	Malaysia	9:22.68	FE

==== Heat 3 ====
Rank	Rower	Country	Time	Notes
1	Viktorija Senkutė	Lithuania	8:04.26	QF
2	Alice Prokešová	Czech Republic	8:09.08	QF
3	Wang Sixuan	China	8:13.67	QF
4	Mazarine Guilbert	Belgium	8:15.64	QF
5	Nicole Martínez	Paraguay	8:27.18	QF

==== Heat 4 ====
Rank	Rower	Country	Time	Notes
1	Lauren Henry	Great Britain	7:54.69	QF
2	Lauren O'Connor	United States	7:59.74	QF
3	Alexandra Föster	Germany	8:03.41	QF
4	Anna Prakaten	Uzbekistan	8:08.76	QF
5	Louise Lefebvre	France	8:11.31	QF

==== Heat 5 ====
Rank	Rower	Country	Time	Notes
1	Paige Badenhorst	South Africa	8:00.98	QF
2	Fiona Murtagh	Ireland	8:01.18	QF
3	Aurelia-Maxima Janzen	Switzerland	8:01.71	QF
4	Beatriz Tavares	Brazil	8:13.18	QF
5	Devi Kailasa Lockwood	Syria	8:51.05	FE

=== Quarterfinals ===
The three fastest boats in each heat advance to the semifinals. The remaining boats were sent to the Final C and Final D.

==== Quarterfinal 1 ====
Rank	Rower	Country	Time	Notes
1	Lauren Henry	Great Britain	7:14.82	SF
2	Karolien Florijn	Netherlands	7:29.79	SF
3	Beatriz Tavares	Brazil	7:35.04	SF
4	Alice Prokešová	Czech Republic	7:38.76	FC
5	Kathryn Glen	New Zealand	7:43.65	FC
6	Maiju Kainlauri	Finland	8:03.83	FD

==== Quarterfinal 2 ====
Rank	Rower	Country	Time	Notes
1	Jovana Arsić	Serbia	7:27.60	SF
2	Lauren O'Connor	United States	7:31.82	SF
3	Paige Badenhorst	South Africa	7:34.05	SF
4	Louise Lefebvre	France	7:49.15	FD
5	Zoltana Gadanyi	Hungary	8:02.25	FD
	Mazarine Guilbert	Belgium	DNS	

==== Quarterfinal 3 ====
Rank	Rower	Country	Time	Notes
1	Fiona Murtagh	Ireland	7:20.80	SF
2	Aurelia-Maxima Janzen	Switzerland	7:21.71	SF
3	Tara Rigney	Australia	7:27.00	SF
4	Frida Sanggaard Nielsen	Denmark	7:27.26	FC
5	Bianca-Camelia Ifteni	Romania	7:38.23	FC
6	Nicole Martínez	Paraguay	7:55.16	FD

==== Quarterfinal 4 ====
Rank	Rower	Country	Time	Notes
1	Viktorija Senkutė	Lithuania	7:26.98	SF
2	Kateryna Dudchenko	Ukraine	7:29.83	SF
3	Alexandra Föster	Germany	7:34.64	SF
4	Anna Prakaten	Uzbekistan	7:42.19	FC
5	Wang Sixuan	China	7:47.02	FC
6	Sophie Souwer	Italy	7:49.08	FD

=== Semifinals ===
==== Semifinal 1 ====
Rank	Rower	Country	Time	Notes
1	Lauren Henry	Great Britain	7:14.58	FA
2	Karolien Florijn	Netherlands	7:23.96	FA
3	Viktorija Senkutė	Lithuania	7:29.68	FA
4	Lauren O'Connor	United States	7:36.40	FB
5	Paige Badenhorst	South Africa	7:44.42	FB
6	Alexandra Föster	Germany	7:53.16	FB

==== Semifinal 2 ====
Rank	Rower	Country	Time	Notes
1	Fiona Murtagh	Ireland	7:24.68	FA
2	Jovana Arsić	Serbia	7:26.25	FA
3	Aurelia-Maxima Janzen	Switzerland	7:29.00	FA
4	Tara Rigney	Australia	7:33.69	FB
5	Kateryna Dudchenko	Ukraine	7:41.10	FB
6	Beatriz Tavares	Brazil	7:46.50	FB

=== Finals ===
The A final determined the rankings for places 1 to 6. Additional rankings were determined in the other finals.

==== Final E ====
Rank	Rower	Country	Time	Total rank
1	Devi Kailasa Lockwood	Syria	8:12.51	24
2	Mae Tasha	Malaysia	8:36.16	25

==== Final D ====
Rank	Rower	Country	Time	Total rank
1	Sophie Souwer	Italy	7:40.28	19
2	Zoltana Gadanyi	Hungary	7:45.81	20
3	Nicole Martínez	Paraguay	7:49.77	21
4	Louise Lefebvre	France	7:52.31	22
5	Maiju Kainlauri	Finland	8:15.29	23

==== Final C ====
Rank	Rower	Country	Time	Total rank
1	Frida Sanggaard Nielsen	Denmark	7:30.05	13
2	Bianca-Camelia Ifteni	Romania	7:33.26	14
3	Alice Prokešová	Czech Republic	7:40.49	15
4	Anna Prakaten	Uzbekistan	7:40.59	16
5	Wang Sixuan	China	7:46.77	17
6	Kathryn Glen	New Zealand	7:47.15	18

==== Final B ====
Rank	Rower	Country	Time	Total rank
1	Alexandra Föster	Germany	7:19.64	7
2	Tara Rigney	Australia	7:24.09	8
3	Kateryna Dudchenko	Ukraine	7:25.50	9
4	Paige Badenhorst	South Africa	7:26.46	10
5	Lauren O'Connor	United States	7:30.84	11
6	Beatriz Tavares	Brazil	7:38.22	12

==== Final A ====
Rank	Rower	Country	Time
1st place, gold medalist(s)	Lauren Henry	United Kingdom	7:15.93
2nd place, silver medalist(s)	Fiona Murtagh	Ireland	7:18.04
3rd place, bronze medalist(s)	Karolien Florijn	Netherlands	7:18.84
4	Aurelia-Maxima Janzen	Switzerland	7:23.47
5	Viktorija Senkutė	Lithuania	7:23.59
6	Jovana Arsić	Serbia	7:36.61
