= Rowing at the 2025 Summer World University Games – Women's single sculls =

Women's single sculls at the 2025 Summer World University Games
- Venue: Regattabahn Duisburg
- Location: Duisburg
- Dates: 25 July (heats, quarterfinals); 26 July (semifinals); 27 July (finals A—E)
- Competitors: 26 from 26 nations

Medalists
gold medal	Anna Šantrůčková	Czech Republic
silver medal	Alexandra Föster	Germany
bronze medal	Elis Özbay	Turkey

The women's single sculls at the 2025 Summer World University Games in Rhine-Ruhr, Germany was held from 25 to 27 July 2025. Anna Šantrůčková from Czech Republic won the gold medal, Alexandra Föster from Germany earned the silver medal and Elis Özbay from Turkey took the bronze medal.

== Schedule ==
All times are Central European Time (UTC+1)

Date	Time	Round
25 July 2025	10:30	Heats
25 July 2025	15:32	Quarterfinals
26 July 2025	8:46	Semifinals
27 July 2025	9:10	Final E
27 July 2025	9:18	Final D
27 July 2025	9:26	Final C
27 July 2025	9:34	Final B
27 July 2025	10:40	Final A

== Results ==
=== Heats ===
The two fastest boats in each heat and the fourteen fastest times advanced directly to the quarterfinals. The remaining boats were sent to the final E.

==== Heat 1 ====
Rank	Rower	Country	Time	Notes
1	Olivia Negrinotti	Switzerland	7:55.30	Q
2	Zara Povey	Great Britain	7:57.77	Q
3	Jacobien van Westreenen	Netherlands	8:03.44	Q
4	Ilaria Corazza	Italy	8:13.41	Q
5	Martina Moya	Spain	8:21.74	Q
6	Kalpani Aleththuge	Sri Lanka	10:22.85	FE

==== Heat 2 ====
Rank	Rower	Country	Time	Notes
1	Alexandra Föster	Germany	7:58.44	Q
2	Elis Özbay	Turkey	8:02.36	Q
3	Sachino Inoue	Japan	8:18.88	Q
4	Ingrid Lofgren	United States	8:20.07	Q
5	Antoaneta Karaivanova	Bulgaria	8:41.40	Q

==== Heat 3 ====
Rank	Rower	Country	Time	Notes
1	Veronika Shliaptseva	Individual Neutral Athletes	8:21.44	Q
2	Eloïse Joris	Belgium	8:43.31	Q
3	Laura Pohevica	Latvia	8:50.99	Q
4	Lin Yu-han	Chinese Taipei	9:02.03	Q
5	Park Seo-yeon	South Korea	9:20.81	Q

==== Heat 4 ====
Rank	Rower	Country	Time	Notes
1	Anna Šantrůčková	Czech Republic	7:58.29	Q
2	Jessika Sobocińska	Poland	8:02.05	Q
3	Eszter Fehérvári	Hungary	8:19.67	Q
4	Mariya Chernets	Kazakhstan	8:24.41	Q
5	Dhanshree Sangale	India	9:31.23	FE

==== Heat 5 ====
Rank	Rower	Country	Time	Notes
1	Malika Tagmatova	Uzbekistan	8:16.15	Q
2	Emily Munroe	Canada	8:26.47	Q
3	Rachel Kõllo	Estonia	8:33.96	Q
4	Sophie Reinehr	Australia	8:36.20	Q
5	Anastasia Iakovlev	Slovakia	8:50.52	Q

=== Quarterfinals ===
The three fastest boats in each heat advanced directly to the quarterfinals. The six fastest times advanced to the final C. The remaining boats were sent to the final D.

==== Quarterfinal 1 ====
Rank	Rower	Country	Time	Notes
1	Jessika Sobocińska	Poland	8:58.91	Q
2	Olivia Negrinotti	Switzerland	9:05.29	Q
3	Eloïse Joris	Belgium	9:14.13	Q
4	Martina Moya	Spain	9:22.09	FC
5	Mariya Chernets	Kazakhstan	9:23.21	FC
6	Park Seo-yeon	South Korea	10:25.63	FD

==== Quarterfinal 2 ====
Rank	Rower	Country	Time	Notes
1	Alexandra Föster	Germany	8:57.61	Q
2	Elis Özbay	Turkey	9:04.32	Q
3	Rachel Kõllo	Estonia	9:20.50	Q
4	Ingrid Lofgren	United States	9:25.91	FD
5	Emily Munroe	Canada	9:28.15	FD
6	Lin Yu-han	Chinese Taipei	10:13.75	FD

==== Quarterfinal 3 ====
Rank	Rower	Country	Time	Notes
1	Eszter Fehérvári	Hungary	8:48.44	Q
2	Veronika Shliaptseva	Individual Neutral Athletes	8:49.98	Q
3	Zara Povey	Great Britain	8:52.09	Q
4	Jacobien van Westreenen	Netherlands	9:01.67	FC
5	Sophie Reinehr	Australia	9:17.37	FC
6	Laura Pohevica	Latvia	9:25.96	FD

==== Quarterfinal 4 ====
Rank	Rower	Country	Time	Notes
1	Anna Šantrůčková	Czech Republic	8:48.00	Q
2	Malika Tagmatova	Uzbekistan	8:54.71	Q
3	Ilaria Corazza	Italy	8:59.57	Q
4	Sachino Inoue	Japan	9:06.33	FC
5	Anastasia Iakovlev	Slovakia	9:12.20	FC
6	Antoaneta Karaivanova	Bulgaria	9:42.95	FD

=== Semifinals ===
The three fastest boats in each heat advanced directly to the final A. The remaining boats were sent to the final B.

==== Semifinal 1 ====
Rank	Rower	Country	Time	Notes
1	Anna Šantrůčková	Czech Republic	7:53.78	Q
2	Ilaria Corazza	Italy	7:57.50	Q
3	Olivia Negrinotti	Switzerland	7:59.44	Q
4	Jessika Sobocińska	Poland	8:12.89	FB
5	Malika Tagmatova	Uzbekistan	8:15.68	FB
6	Eloïse Joris	Belgium	8:36.24	FB

==== Semifinal 2 ====
Rank	Rower	Country	Time	Notes
1	Alexandra Föster	Germany	7:52.51	Q
2	Zara Povey	Great Britain	7:54.22	Q
3	Elis Özbay	Turkey	7:54.64	Q
4	Veronika Shliaptseva	Individual Neutral Athletes	8:04.25	FB
5	Eszter Fehérvári	Hungary	8:04.87	FB
6	Rachel Kõllo	Estonia	8:18.66	FB

=== Finals ===
The A final determined the rankings for places 1 to 6. Additional rankings were determined in the other finals.

==== Final E ====
Rank	Rower	Country	Time	Total rank
1	Dhanshree Sangale	India	9:56.91	25
2	Kalpani Aleththuge	Sri Lanka	10:52.35	26

==== Final D ====
Rank	Rower	Country	Time	Total rank
1	Emily Munroe	Canada	8:39.06	19
2	Ingrid Lofgren	United States	8:45.98	20
3	Antoaneta Karaivanova	Bulgaria	9:11.77	21
4	Laura Pohevica	Latvia	9:17.83	22
5	Lin Yu-han	Chinese Taipei	9:26.55	23
6	Park Seo-yeon	South Korea	9:39.53	24

==== Final C ====
Rank	Rower	Country	Time	Total rank
1	Jacobien van Westreenen	Netherlands	8:27.22	13
2	Mariya Chernets	Kazakhstan	8:38.48	14
3	Sophie Reinehr	Australia	8:42.34	15
4	Sachino Inoue	Japan	8:44.51	16
5	Martina Moya	Spain	8:48.10	17
6	Anastasia Iakovlev	Slovakia	9:02.03	18

==== Final B ====
Rank	Rower	Country	Time	Total rank
1	Veronika Shliaptseva	Individual Neutral Athletes	8:29.03	7
2	Jessika Sobocińska	Poland	8:31.60	8
3	Eszter Fehérvári	Hungary	8:36.09	9
4	Rachel Kõllo	Estonia	8:38.17	10
5	Malika Tagmatova	Uzbekistan	8:42.54	11
6	Eloïse Joris	Belgium	8:44.18	12

==== Final A ====
Rank	Rower	Country	Time	Notes
1st place, gold medalist(s)	Anna Šantrůčková	Czech Republic	8:20.42	
2nd place, silver medalist(s)	Alexandra Föster	Germany	8:21.09	
3rd place, bronze medalist(s)	Elis Özbay	Turkey	8:32.72	
4	Olivia Negrinotti	Switzerland	8:34.18	
5	Zara Povey	Great Britain	8:35.89	
6	Ilaria Corazza	Italy	8:52.16	
