= 2026 World Rowing Championships – Women's double sculls =

Women's double sculls at the 2026 World Rowing Championships
- Venue: Bosbaan
- Location: Amsterdam, Netherlands
- Dates: 24–28 August
- Competitors: 38 from 19 nations
- Winning time: 6:43.48

Medalists
gold medal	Zoe Hyde; Margaret Cremen	Ireland
silver medal	Roos de Jong; Benthe Boonstra	Netherlands
bronze medal	Salome Ulrich; Fabienne Schweizer	Switzerland

The women's double sculls competition at the 2026 World Rowing Championships took place at Bosbaan, in Amsterdam.

== Schedule ==
The schedule was as follows:

Date	Time	Round
Monday 24 August 2026	18:18	Heats
Wednesday 26 August 2026	15:34	Final C
Wednesday 26 August 2026	17:49	Semifinals
Friday, 28 August 2026	15:05	Final B
Friday, 28 August 2026	18:17	Final A

All times are Central European Summer Time (UTC+2)

== Results ==
=== Heats ===
The two fastest boats in each heat and the four fastest times advanced to the semifinals. Other crews to Final C and remaining crew eliminated.

==== Heat 1 ====
Rank	Rower	Country	Time	Notes
1	Zoe Hyde; Margaret Cremen	Ireland	7:46.73	SF
2	Diana Serebrianska; Yevheniya Dovhodko	Ukraine	7:51.07	SF
3	Zhang Xinyu; Shen Shuangmei	China	7:55.67	FC
4	Isa Darvin; Grace Joyce	United States	7:57.31	FC
5	Sophie Egnot-Johnson; Eva Hofmans	New Zealand	8:02.82	FC

==== Heat 2 ====
Rank	Rower	Country	Time	Notes
1	Martyna Kazlauskaitė; Dovilė Rimkutė	Lithuania	7:38.67	SF
2	Mya Bosquet; Emma Lunatti	France	7:41.42	SF
3	Lisa Gutfleisch; Sarah Wibberenz	Germany	7:43.22	SF
4	Clara Guerra; Alice Gnatta	Italy	7:50.67	SF
5	Dimitra Kontou; Evangelia Anastasiadou	Greece	7:50.92	FC

==== Heat 3 ====
Rank	Rower	Country	Time	Notes
1	Sarah McKay; Cameron Nyland	Great Britain	7:40.42	SF
2	Wiktoria Kalinowska; Julia Rogiewicz	Poland	7:45.70	SF
3	Grace Vandenbroek; Alizée Brien	Canada	7:47.25	SF
4	Tatsiana Klimovich; Alena Furman	Individual Neutral Athletes	7:50.65	SF
5	Laura Swoboda; Lara Tiefenthaler	Austria	8:02.05	FC

==== Heat 4 ====
Rank	Rower	Country	Time	Notes
1	Roos de Jong; Benthe Boonstra	Netherlands	7:43.33	SF
2	Salome Ulrich; Fabienne Schweizer	Switzerland	7:45.61	SF
3	Mariana-Laura Dumitru; Alexandra Ungureanu	Romania	7:58.20	FC
4	Bianca Wollmeister; Alejandra Alonso	Paraguay	8:28.62	

=== Semifinals ===
The three fastest boats in each heat advance to the Final A. The remaining boats were sent to the Final B.

==== Semifinal 1 ====
Rank	Rower	Country	Time	Notes
1	Salome Ulrich; Fabienne Schweizer	Switzerland	7:10.78	FA
2	Roos de Jong; Benthe Boonstra	Netherlands	7:11.19	FA
3	Grace Vandenbroek; Alizée Brien	Canada	7:13.63	FA
4	Martyna Kazlauskaitė; Dovilė Rimkutė	Lithuania	7:14.28	FB
5	Tatsiana Klimovich; Alena Furman	Individual Neutral Athletes	7:25.91	FB
6	Diana Serebrianska; Yevheniya Dovhodko	Ukraine	7:36.56	FB

==== Semifinal 2 ====
Rank	Rower	Country	Time	Notes
1	Zoe Hyde; Margaret Cremen	Ireland	7:09.17	FA
2	Clara Guerra; Alice Gnatta	Italy	7:11.98	FA
3	Wiktoria Kalinowska; Julia Rogiewicz	Poland	7:12.43	FA
4	Sarah McKay; Cameron Nyland	Great Britain	7:14.43	FB
5	Mya Bosquet; Emma Lunatti	France	7:16.25	FB
6	Lisa Gutfleisch; Sarah Wibberenz	Germany	7:19.12	FB

=== Finals ===
The A final determined the rankings for places 1 to 6. Additional rankings were determined in the other finals.

==== Final C ====
Rank	Rower	Country	Time	Total rank
1	Dimitra Kontou; Evangelia Anastasiadou	Greece	7:20.88	13
2	Zhang Xinyu; Shen Shuangmei	China	7:22.59	14
3	Laura Swoboda; Lara Tiefenthaler	Austria	7:24.52	15
4	Isa Darvin; Grace Joyce	United States	7:26.18	16
5	Mariana-Laura Dumitru; Alexandra Ungureanu	Romania	7:28.69	17
6	Sophie Egnot-Johnson; Eva Hofmans	New Zealand	7:34.67	18

==== Final B ====
Rank	Rower	Country	Time	Total rank
1	Sarah McKay; Cameron Nyland	Great Britain	6:47.30	7
2	Lisa Gutfleisch; Sarah Wibberenz	Germany	6:49.42	8
3	Mya Bosquet; Emma Lunatti	France	6:50.64	9
4	Tatsiana Klimovich; Alena Furman	Individual Neutral Athletes	6:53.64	10
5	Diana Serebrianska; Yevheniya Dovhodko	Ukraine	7:05.72	11
	Martyna Kazlauskaitė; Dovilė Rimkutė	Lithuania	DNS	12

==== Final A ====
Rank	Rower	Country	Time
1st place, gold medalist(s)	Zoe Hyde; Margaret Cremen	Ireland	6:43.48
2nd place, silver medalist(s)	Roos de Jong; Benthe Boonstra	Netherlands	6:44.51
3rd place, bronze medalist(s)	Salome Ulrich; Fabienne Schweizer	Switzerland	6:48.51
4	Wiktoria Kalinowska; Julia Rogiewicz	Poland	6:54.07
5	Grace Vandenbroek; Alizée Brien	Canada	6:54.82
6	Clara Guerra; Alice Gnatta	Italy	6:56.47
