= 2025 World Rowing Championships – Women's double sculls =

Women's double sculls at the 2025 World Rowing Championships
- Venue: Dianshan Lake
- Location: Shanghai, China
- Dates: 22–26 September
- Competitors: 24 from 12 nations
- Winning time: 6:49.34

Medalists
gold medal	Roos de Jong; Benthe Boonstra	Netherlands
silver medal	Chen Yunxia; Zhang Ling	China
bronze medal	Tatsiana Klimovich; Alena Furman	Individual Neutral Athletes

The women's double sculls competition at the 2025 World Rowing Championships took place at Dianshan Lake, in Shanghai.

== Schedule ==
The schedule was as follows:

Date	Time	Round
Monday 22 September 2025	10:37	Heats
Friday, 26 September 2025	13:29	Final B
Friday, 26 September 2025	14:37	Final A

All times are UTC+08:00

== Results ==
=== Heats ===
The two fastest boats in each heat and the two fastest times advanced directly to Final A. The remaining boats were sent to Final B.

==== Heat 1 ====
Rank	Rower	Country	Time	Notes
1	Élodie Ravera-Scaramozzino; Emma Lunatti	France	6:56.82	FA
2	Salome Ulrich; Fabienne Schweizer	Switzerland	6:58.63	FA
3	Evangelia Anastasiadou; Zoi Fitsiou	Greece	7:00.28	FA
4	Anna Prakaten; Malika Tagmatova	Uzbekistan	7:00.58	FB
5	Isabela Darvin; Grace Joyce	United States	7:00.83	FB
6	Bianca-Camelia Ifteni; Mariana-Laura Dumitru	Romania	7:11.30	FB

==== Heat 2 ====
Rank	Rower	Country	Time	Notes
1	Chen Yunxia; Zhang Ling	China	6:54.96	FA
2	Roos de Jong; Benthe Boonstra	Netherlands	6:56.68	FA
3	Tatsiana Klimovich; Alena Furman	Individual Neutral Athletes	6:57.80	FA
4	Zoe Hyde; Margaret Cremen	Ireland	7:02.25	FB
5	Cameron Nyland; Lucy Glover	Great Britain	7:10.71	FB
6	Aina Cid i Centelles; Virginia Díaz Rivas	Spain	7:15.76	FB

=== Finals ===
The A final determined the rankings for places 1 to 6. Additional rankings were determined in the other finals.

==== Final B ====
Rank	Rower	Country	Time	Total rank
1	Zoe Hyde; Margaret Cremen	Ireland	7:00.20	7
2	Isabela Darvin; Grace Joyce	United States	7:00.93	8
3	Anna Prakaten; Malika Tagmatova	Uzbekistan	7:02.60	9
4	Aina Cid i Centelles; Virginia Díaz Rivas	Spain	7:09.53	10
5	Cameron Nyland; Lucy Glover	Great Britain	7:11.50	11
6	Bianca-Camelia Ifteni; Mariana-Laura Dumitru	Romania	7:15.71	12

==== Final A ====
Rank	Rower	Country	Time	Notes
1st place, gold medalist(s)	Roos de Jong; Benthe Boonstra	Netherlands	6:49.34	
2nd place, silver medalist(s)	Chen Yunxia; Zhang Ling	China	6:50.22	
3rd place, bronze medalist(s)	Tatsiana Klimovich; Alena Furman	Individual Neutral Athletes	6:53.26	
4	Salome Ulrich; Fabienne Schweizer	Switzerland	6:55.35	
5	Élodie Ravera-Scaramozzino; Emma Lunatti	France	6:57.39	
6	Evangelia Anastasiadou; Zoi Fitsiou	Greece	7:04.10	
