= Fiona Murtagh (rower) =

Irish rower (born 1995)

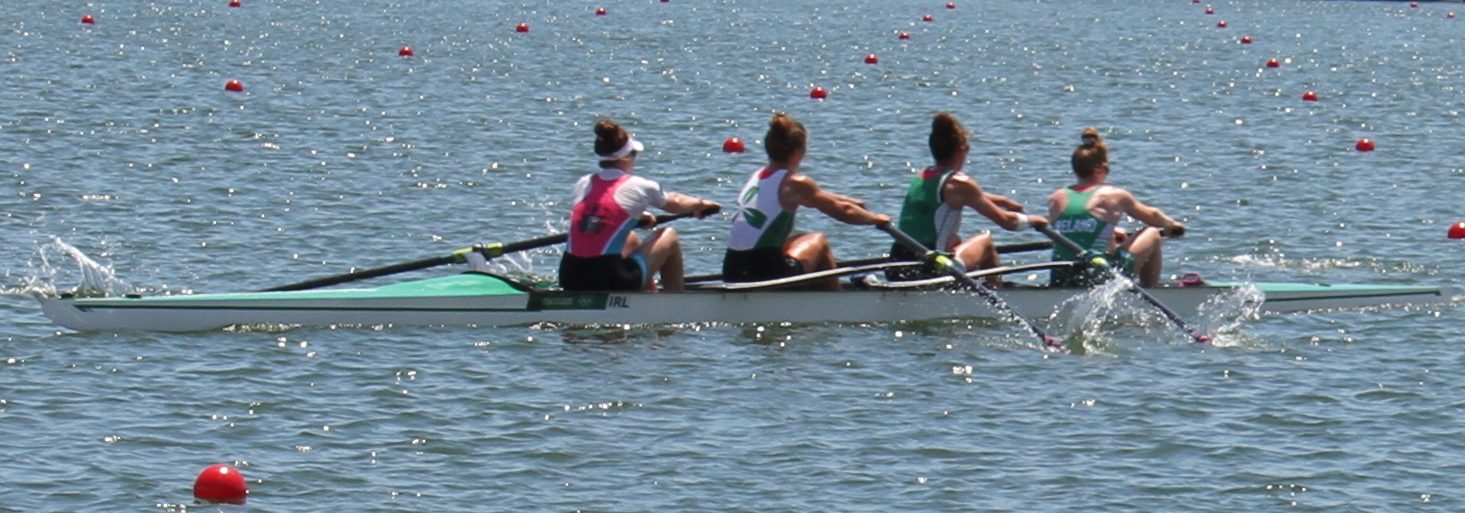
- Murtagh at the 2020 Summer Olympics

Personal information
- Nationality: Irish
- Born: 11 July 1995 (age 31) Galway, Ireland
- Height: 1.85 m (6 ft 1 in)

Sport
- Sport: Rowing
- College team: Fordham Rams
Medal record
Women's rowing
Representing Ireland
Olympic Games
Bronze medal – third place	2020 Tokyo	Coxless four
World Championships
Gold medal – first place	2025 Shanghai	Single sculls
Silver medal – second place	2026 Amsterdam	Single sculls
European Championships
Silver medal – second place	2025 Plovdiv	Single sculls
Silver medal – second place	2021 Varese	Coxless four
Bronze medal – third place	2020 Poznan	Coxless four

Fiona Murtagh (F'YOH-na MUR-tah; born 11 July 1995) is an Irish rower. She competed in the women's coxless four event at the 2020 Summer Olympics and won a bronze medal. Murtagh attended Fordham University from 2012 to 2016 on a rowing scholarship. Along with her team-mates, she was named as the Irish Times/Sport Ireland Sportswoman for July 2021.
