= Tara Rigney =

Australian rower (born 1999)

Personal information
- Born: 30 March 1999 (age 27) Westminster, London, UK
- Home town: Sydney, New South Wales, Australia
- Years active: 2019–current
- Height: 182 cm (6 ft 0 in)

Sport
- Country: Australia
- Sport: Rowing
- Club: Sydney University Boat Club
- Coached by: Ellen Randell

Achievements and titles
- National finals: Nell Slatter trophy 2021; Aust Champion W2X 2021
Medal record
Women's rowing
Representing Australia
World Championships
Bronze medal – third place	2023 Belgrade	Single sculls
Bronze medal – third place	2022 Račice	Single sculls

Tara Rigney (born 30 March 1999) is an Australian representative rower. A sculler, she is a three-time Australian national champion, a dual world championship medallist and a 2021 Tokyo Olympian and 2024 Paris Olympian who competed in the Australian women's Double-Scull and Single Scull events respectively.

== Early life and education ==
Tara Rigney was born on 30 March 1999 in Westminster, London, England.

She attended at Loreto Kirribilli school in Sydney, where she took up rowing, although in her senior years she played netball for the school.

She later rowed for the Sydney University Boat Club.

== State rowing ==
Rigney's state representative debut for New South Wales came in 2019, when she was selected in the state women's youth VIII which raced and won the Bicentennial Cup at the Interstate Regatta.

In 2021, following a dominant performance at the New South Wales state titles, she was selected as the NSW senior women's sculling representative for the Interstate Regatta. She won that national title, the Nell Slatter trophy. At that same regatta, she won an Australian Championship title in the double scull with Amanda Bateman. In a quad scull contesting the 2021 open women's quad title, she finished in second place.

She won the open women's national single scull title at the 2023 Australian Rowing Championships as well as the open double scull title racing with Rowena Meredith. That year, she was again selected as NSW's single scull representative at the Interstate Regatta and won that national title.

== International representative rowing ==
Rigney made her Australian representative debut in 2019 when she was picked for the World Rowing U23 Championships in Sarasota in a coxless pair. That crew finished in tenth place.

After the New South Wales Institute of Sport identified Rigney as having potential, she was invited to join the women's national training centre at Penrith in 2021.

By the time of national team selections in 2021 for the delayed Tokyo Olympics, Rigney's strong performances at that year's Australian Championships saw her selected to join Amanda Bateman who had already qualified for Australia's double scull boat class during the 2019 international representative season. Bateman and Rigney placed third in their heat, fifth in the semi-final and won the petite final for an overall seventh-place finish at the Olympic regatta. They were coached by Ellen Randall.

Rigney was selected in the Australian sculling squad for the 2022 international season and the 2022 World Rowing Championships. Racing as Australia's single scull entrant, she won bronze at the World Rowing Cup II in Poznan and then took silver at the WRC III in Lucerne. At the 2022 World Rowing Championships at Racize, she raced as Australia's representative single sculler. She qualified for the A final and raced to a third place and a bronze medal at the World Championships.

In March 2023 Rigney was again selected in the Australian women's sculling squad for the 2023 international season. At the WRC II in Varese, Italy she raced as Australia's 1X entrant and won the silver medal. She backed up that performance three weeks later at the WRCIII in Lucerne, winning her heat and semi-final and taking the silver medal in the W1X final behind 2022 world-champion Karolien Florijn. Rigney was Australia's single scull choice at the 2023 World Rowing Championships in Belgrade, Serbia. She dominated her heat on day 1 and won her quarter-final. She placed 2nd in the A/B semi-final at which point she qualified an Australian W1X boat for the 2024 Paris Olympics. In the A final at the 500m mark she was second behind the eventual winner Karolien Florijn but was then also headed by Emma Twigg. She held that third place through to the finish, won the bronze medal and a third place world ranking from the regatta.
