= Lauren Henry =

British rower (born 2001)

Lauren Henry MBE
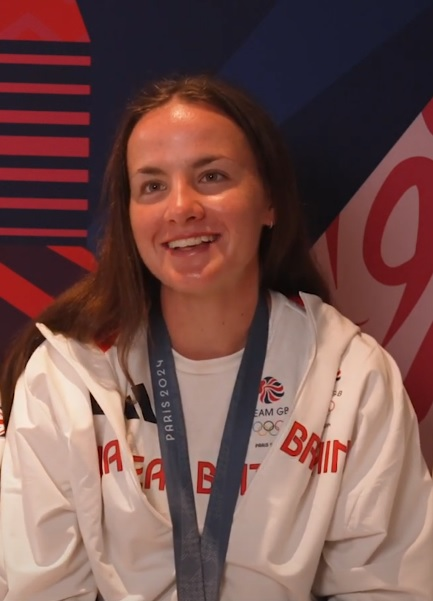
- Henry at the 2024 Summer Olympics

Personal information
- Born: 21 December 2001 (age 24) Lutterworth, Leicestershire, England

Sport
- Country: Great Britain
- Sport: Rowing
- Club: Leicester RC/University of Leicester BC
- Coached by: Andrew Randell, Peter Sheppard
Medal record
Women's rowing
Representing Great Britain
Olympic Games
Gold medal – first place	2024 Paris	Quadruple sculls
World Championships
Gold medal – first place	2023 Belgrade	Quadruple sculls
Gold medal – first place	2026 Amsterdam	Single sculls
Silver medal – second place	2025 Shanghai	Single sculls
European Championships
Gold medal – first place	2024 Szeged	Quadruple sculls
Gold medal – first place	2025 Plovdiv	Single sculls
Gold medal – first place	2026 Varese	Single sculls
Bronze medal – third place	2023 Bled	Quadruple sculls
U23 European Championships
Bronze medal – third place	2022 Hazewinkel	Double sculls

Lauren Henry (born 21 December 2001) is an Olympic gold medallist and world champion British rower.

== Career ==
Henry took the overall win in the British Rowing Senior Trials 2023 in the W1x, whilst still an U23 eligible athlete.

Henry won a bronze medal in her first senior event; in the quadruple sculls at the 2023 European Rowing Championships.

At the 2023 World Rowing Championships in Belgrade, she won the World Championship gold medal in the Quadruple sculls with Lola Anderson, Hannah Scott and Georgina Brayshaw.

The team won the gold medal in the quadruple sculls at the 2024 Paris Summer Olympics.

Henry moved into the single sculls after the Paris Games. She won the gold medal in the women’s single scull at the 2025 European Rowing Championships and set a new British record and European best time. It was the second fastest time ever recorded in the women’s single sculls event. She started the 2026 international season with a win in the women's single at World Rowing Cup I in Seville, Spain.
