= Emma Lunatti =

French rower

Personal information
- Born: 3 July 1998 (age 28) Saint-Martin-d'Hères, France
- Height: 1.77 m (5 ft 10 in)
- Weight: 75 kg (165 lb)

Sport
- Country: France
- Sport: Rowing
- Event: Sculls
- Club: Aviron Grenoblois

Emma Lunatti (born 3 July 1998) is a French rower. She finished 9th in the women's quadruple sculls event at the 2020 Summer Olympics and 5th in the women's double sculls event at the 2024 Summer Olympics.

== See also ==
- 2022 World Rowing Championships – Women's single sculls
- 2023 World Rowing Championships – Women's double sculls
- 2025 World Rowing Championships – Women's double sculls
- 2026 World Rowing Championships – Women's double sculls
