= Nihed Benchadli =

Algerian rower (born 2001)

Personal information
- Nationality: Algerian
- Born: 30 September 2001 (age 25) Oran, Algeria

Sport
- Country: Algeria
- Sport: Rowing
- Event: Single sculls

Nihed Benchadli (born 30 September 2001) is an Algerian rower. At the 2024 Summer Olympics, he competed in the women's single sculls event, where she finished 5th in her heat and was eliminated.
