= Jessika Sobocińska =

Polish rower

Personal information
- Born: 13 March 2001 (age 24)

Sport
- Sport: Rowing

Jessika Sobocińska (born 13 March 2001) is a Polish professional rower. She won a gold medal at the 2024 World Rowing Championships in the lightweight coxless pair. In April 2025, she received the Głos Wielkopolski award.

== Awards ==
World Championship
Year	Place	Medal	Type
2024	St. Catharines (Canada)	Gold	Lightweight coxless pair
World Rowing U23 Championships
Year	Place	Medal	Type
2022	Varese (Italy)	Bronze	Lightweight coxless pair
