= Karolien Florijn =

Dutch rower (born 1998)

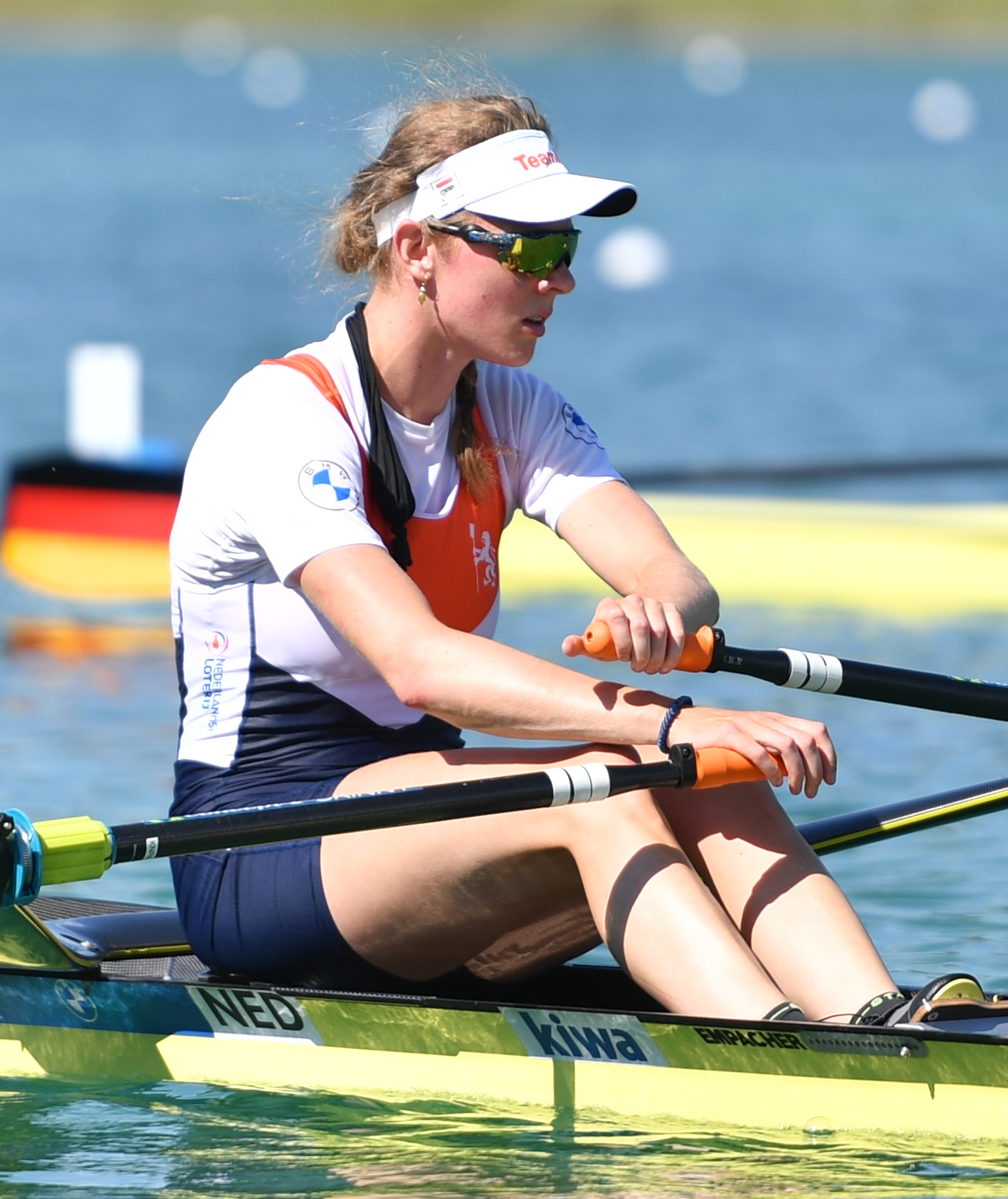
- Florijn in 2022

Personal information
- Nationality: Dutch
- Born: 6 April 1998 (age 28) Leiden
- Parents: Ronald Florijn (father); Antje Rehaag (mother)
- Relative: Finn Florijn (brother)

Sport
- Country: Netherlands
- Sport: Rowing
- Events: Coxless four, eights, single sculls, quadruple sculls
- Club: Nereus
Medal record
Women's rowing
Representing the Netherlands
Olympic Games
Gold medal – first place	2024 Paris	Single sculls
Silver medal – second place	2020 Tokyo	Coxless four
World Championships
Gold medal – first place	2022 Račice	Single sculls
Gold medal – first place	2023 Belgrade	Single sculls
Silver medal – second place	2019 Ottensheim	Coxless four
Bronze medal – third place	2018 Plovdiv	Quadruple sculls
Bronze medal – third place	2026 Amsterdam	Single sculls
European Championships
Gold medal – first place	2019 Lucerne	Coxless four
Gold medal – first place	2020 Poznań	Coxless four
Gold medal – first place	2021 Varese	Coxless four
Gold medal – first place	2022 Munich	Single sculls
Gold medal – first place	2023 Bled	Single sculls
Silver medal – second place	2017 Račice	Eight
Bronze medal – third place	2018 Glasgow	Quadruple sculls

Karolien Florijn (born 6 April 1998) is a Dutch rower. She was a member of the Dutch coxless four, along with Ellen Hogerwerf, Ymkje Clevering and Veronique Meester, that won an Olympic silver medal in Tokyo 2020. The same crew was a three-time European Champion (in 2019, 2020 and 2021) and won a silver medal at the 2019 World Rowing Championships. Florijn returned to the single sculls in 2022, winning the overall World Rowing Cup trophy and winning the gold medal at the European Championships in Munich. She won the single sculls event at the 2024 Paris Summer Olympic Games.

== Rowing family ==
She is the daughter of Ronald Florijn, who won gold at the 1988 Summer Olympics in the double sculls and gold at the 1996 Summer Olympics in the eight and Antje Rehaag, former Olympic rower and 1994 world champion in the German women's eight. One of her brothers, Finn, is also an Olympic rower, and a Paris Summer Olympics gold medalist.
