= Emma Twigg =

New Zealand rower (born 1987)

Emma Twigg MNZM
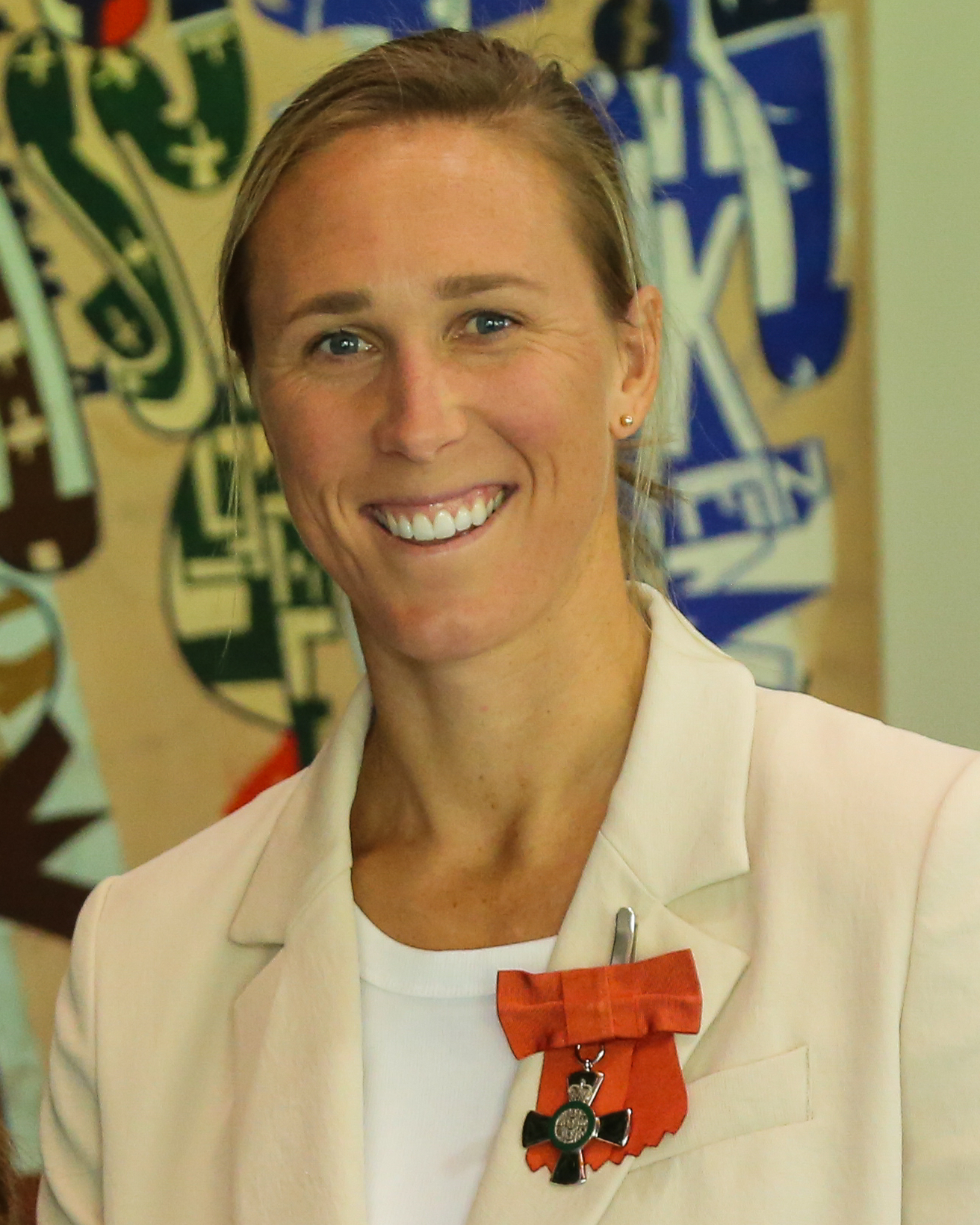
- Twigg in 2022

Personal information
- Born: 1 March 1987 (age 39) Napier, New Zealand
- Height: 1.81 m (5 ft 11 in)
- Weight: 80 kg (176 lb)

Sport
- Sport: Rowing
- Event: Single sculls
- Club: Hawkes Bay RC
Medal record
Women's rowing
Representing New Zealand
Olympic Games
Silver medal – second place	2024 Paris	Single sculls
Gold medal – first place	2020 Tokyo	Single sculls
World Championships
Gold medal – first place	2014 Amsterdam	Single sculls
Silver medal – second place	2013 Chungju	Single sculls
Silver medal – second place	2019 Ottensheim	Single sculls
Silver medal – second place	2022 Račice	Single sculls
Silver medal – second place	2023 Belgrade	Single sculls
Bronze medal – third place	2010 Karapiro	Single sculls
Bronze medal – third place	2011 Bled	Single sculls

Emma Kimberley Twigg MNZM (born 1 March 1987) is a New Zealand rower. A single sculler, she was the 2014 world champion and won gold in her fourth Olympics in Tokyo in July 2021. Previous Olympic appearances were in 2008 (ninth place), 2012 (fourth place), and 2016 (fourth place). She has retired from rowing twice, first for master-level studies in Europe in 2015 and then after the 2016 Olympics, disappointed at having narrowly missed an Olympic medal for the second time. After two years off the water, she started training again in 2018 and won silver at the 2019 World Rowing Championships. Since her marriage in 2020, she has become an outspoken advocate for LGBT athletes. At the 2020 Summer Olympics, Twigg won gold in the woman's single scull. At the 2024 Summer Olympics, Twigg won Silver in the same event.

== Early life, education and work ==
Twigg was born in 1987 in Napier, New Zealand. Her father is rowing coach Peter Twigg. She received her secondary education at Napier Girls' High School and was head prefect in her final year.

Twigg gained a Bachelor of Communications from University of Waikato while a professional rower. She took 2015 off from rowing and completed a FIFA Master in Management, Law, and Humanities of Sport.

She retired from rowing after the 2016 Summer Olympics and was employed by the International Olympic Committee (IOC) in Switzerland for two years. While working at the 2018 Winter Olympics in Pyeongchang County, South Korea, the idea formed to start rowing again with a view of attending the 2020 Tokyo Olympics. Twigg joined fellow former IOC employee Rebecca Wardell and another rower in April 2018 to cycle from Switzerland towards Singapore for four months, but changed her mind after six weeks and flew home instead to restart training and be with her new partner.

== Career ==
Encouraged to take up rowing by her father, Twigg started the sport in 2001 aged 14 while at Napier Girls' High School; she also joined Hawke's Bay Rowing Club, where her father is a rowing coach. Aged 16, she won her first national titles. She first represented New Zealand internationally at the 2003 World Rowing Junior Championships in Athens, Greece, where she was part of the junior women's eight that came sixth. At the 2004 World Rowing Junior Championships in Banyoles, Spain, she came third with the junior women's eight in the B-final. As rowing became more serious, she moved from Napier to Cambridge to be at the high performance centre near Lake Karapiro.

For the 2004/05 southern hemisphere summer season, Twigg switched to the single scull boat class. At the July 2005 World Rowing U23 Championships in Amsterdam, Netherlands, she came fourth. At the August 2005 World Rowing Junior Championships in Brandenburg, Germany, she won gold. For the 2005/06 southern hemisphere summer season, Twigg joined the elite rowers and was part of the women's eight. At the 2006 World Rowing Cup II in Poznań, Poland, they came second in the B-final. At the 2006 World Rowing Cup III on the Rotsee in Switzerland, they came fifth. At the 2006 World Rowing Championships, the team won the B-final (i.e. came seventh overall). The following season, Twigg was back in the single scull because every other boat was already full (Georgina and Caroline Evers-Swindell had the double, and Nicky Coles and Juliette Haigh were in the pair). At the 2007 World Rowing U23 Championships in Glasgow, United Kingdom, she won a gold medal with three boat lengths ahead of the silver. The win gained her entry to the elite women's team. At the 2007 World Rowing Championships at Oberschleißheim Regatta Course near Munich, Germany, she came sixth and this gave New Zealand a qualification for this boat class at the 2008 Summer Olympics.

In preparation for the 2008 Olympics, Twigg raced at all three World Rowing Cups; she came third at Cup I at Oberschleißheim Regatta Course, came fifth at Cup II at the Rotsee, and came third at Cup III in Poznań. She could not hold onto this form for the Beijing Olympics, where she missed the A-final and came third in the B-final (or ninth overall). Aged 21, she was the youngest New Zealand rower in Beijing and is listed as New Zealand Olympian number 1097. In 2009, Twigg attended World Rowing Cups II and III and came second in both events. She won the 2009 Princess Royal Challenge Cup at the Henley Royal Regatta. At the 2009 World Rowing Championships in Poznań, she came in fourth place, narrowly beaten by Czech rower Miroslava Knapková for the bronze medal.

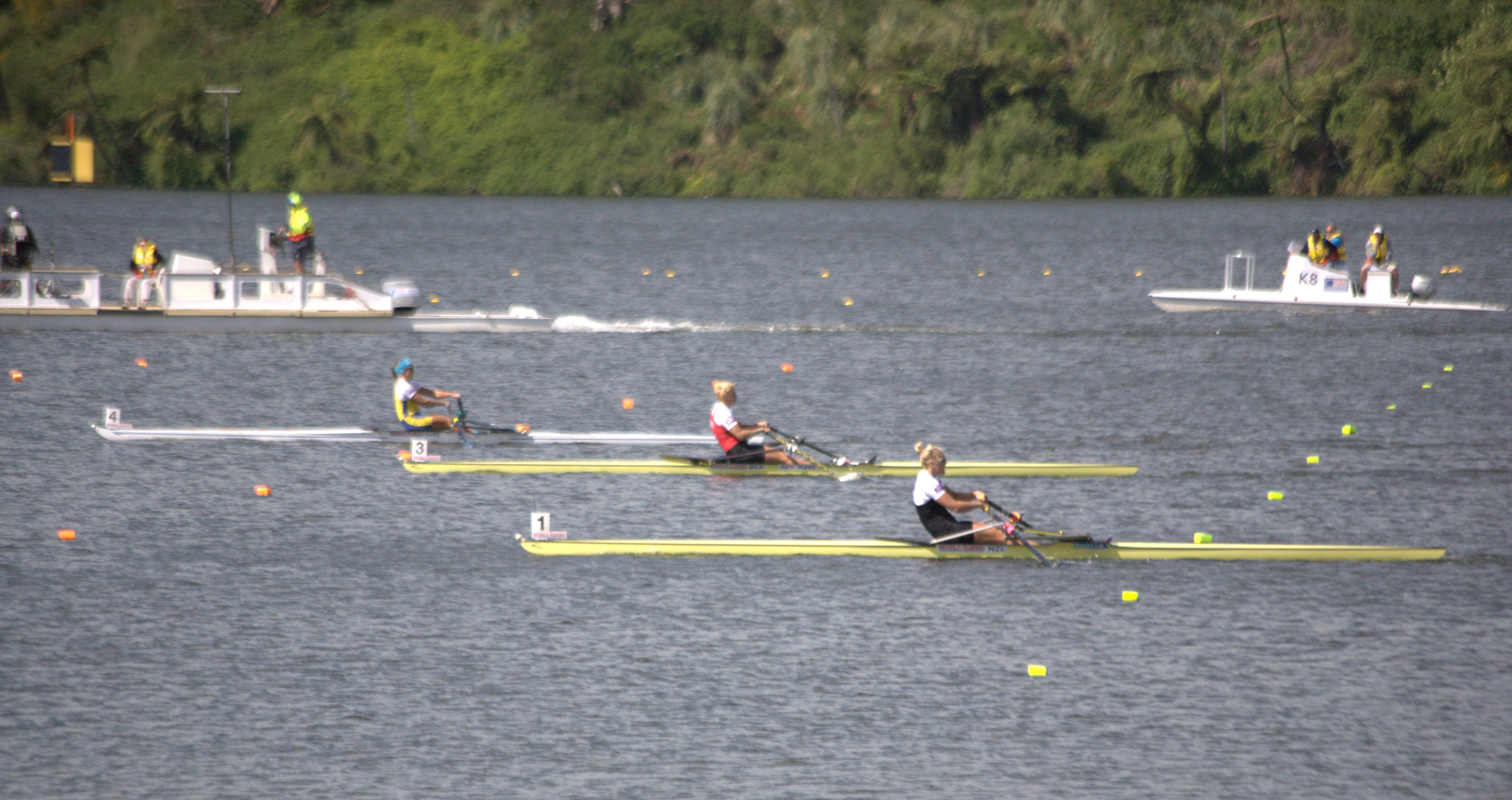
2010 World Rowing Championships W1x final showing Twigg (bronze; foreground), Ekaterina Karsten (silver), and Frida Svensson (gold)

In 2010, Twigg travelled to Europe to compete in World Rowing Cups I and II, gaining a second and a seventh placement. The 2010 World Rowing Championships were held on her home training course on Lake Karapiro near Cambridge and there she gained her first World Rowing Championship medal: a bronze. In 2011, Twigg attended World Rowing Cups II and III and came second and first, respectively. At the 2011 World Rowing Championships in Bled, Slovenia, Twigg won her second World Rowing Championship bronze medal. That bronze medal qualified New Zealand to be represented in this boat class at the 2012 Summer Olympics. In the Olympic year, Twigg went to World Rowing Cups II and III in preparation. She came fifth at the Rotsee and was second in Oberschleißheim. At the London Olympics, she came fourth.

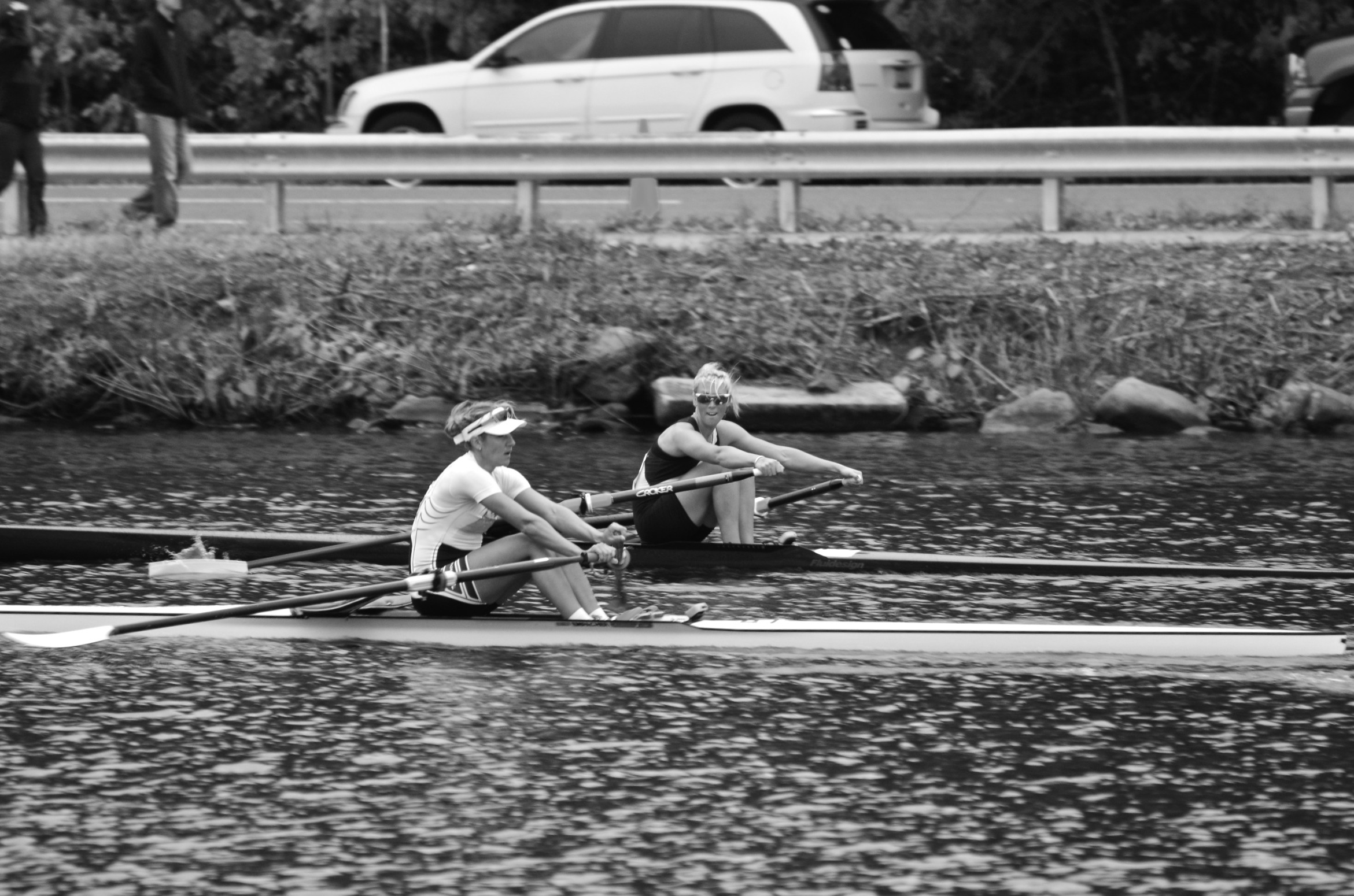
Miroslava Knapková (front) and Twigg at the Head of the Charles Regatta in October 2013

In 2013, Twigg attended World Rowing Cups II and III and came first and fourth, respectively. At the 2013 World Rowing Championships in Chungju in South Korea, she won the silver medal. In 2014, she went to all three World Rowing Cups, with Cup I held in Sydney, Australia, followed by two Cups in Europe. She dominated throughout all Cup events and came first in every single race. She carried the consistent form through to the 2014 World Rowing Championships in Amsterdam, where she also won her heat, semi-final, and the A-final, which gave her the world championship crown.

Before the 2014 World Rowing Championships, Twigg announced that she would take the southern hemisphere 2014/15 rowing season off for study in Europe, with an aim to get back into rowing in time for the 2016 Rio Olympics. The study timetable meant that she would miss the 2015 World Rowing Championships, which doubled as an Olympic qualifying event. She had to rely on the 2016 European & Final Qualification Regatta at the Rotsee in May 2016; she won all three races in this sudden death competition and gained her Olympic qualification. At the 2016 World Rowing Cup III in Poznań, she was beaten by her then-arch rival Kim Brennan from Australia and had to settle for second place. At the 2016 Summer Olympics, she very narrowly missed out on a medal, just beaten by the Chinese rower Duan Jingli for bronze. Deeply disappointed on having again missed out on an Olympic medal, she announced her retirement from rowing not long after the medal ceremony, calling coming fourth at the Olympics for a second time "almost my worst nightmare".

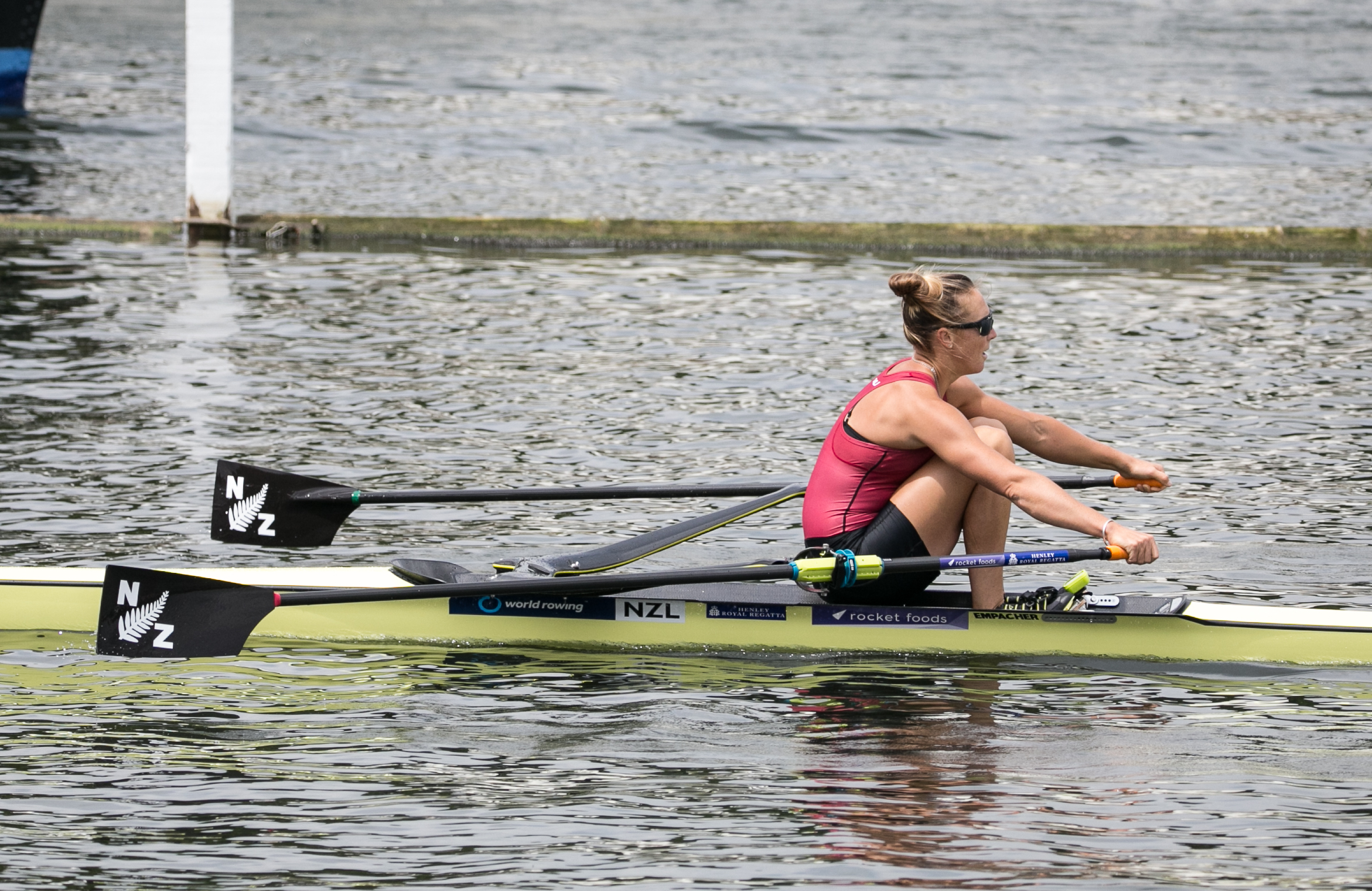
Twigg at the 2019 Henley Royal Regatta

After work for the IOC, she started training on the water again in September 2018, with Mike Rodger as her coach. By the time the 2018 Christmas Regatta was held at Lake Karapiro, she had regained her national dominance in single scull, leaving Brooke Donoghue and Hannah Osborne for second and third place, respectively. At the North Island Club Champs in January 2019, Twigg again displaced Osborne and Donoghue to second and third place, respectively. In February 2019 at the NZ Rowing Championships held on Lake Ruataniwha, Twigg took out the national title, with Donoghue and lightweight rower Zoe McBride coming second and third, respectively. With other elite rowers, she travelled to 2019 World Rowing Cups II and III in Poznań and Amsterdam, which she both won. In July 2019, Twigg won the Princess Royal Challenge Cup (Open women's single scull) at the Henley Royal Regatta. At the 2019 World Rowing Championships, Twigg won silver, beaten by the Irish rower and reigning 2019 European Championship holder Sanita Pušpure (who had not competed in the 2019 Rowing World Cups). The 2019 World Rowing Championships qualified New Zealand to be represented in this boat class at the 2020 Summer Olympics in Tokyo.

The Summer Olympics were postponed by a year due to the COVID-19 pandemic and Twigg did no international racing during 2020. Twigg was announced on 12 June 2021 as part of the squad for Tokyo. On 30 July 2021, Twigg won the gold medal in the women's single sculls event.

Twigg also plays cricket. In the 2021–22 season, she played two matches for the Northern Districts A team, and also featured as the twelfth man for the Northern Braves in their final match of the 2021–22 Super Smash tournament in January 2022.

== Honours and awards ==
Following her U23 world championship title in 2007, Twigg won the Emerging Talent Award at the Halberg Awards. As part of the prize, she received a NZ$25k scholarship. In 2014, Twigg earned the title of 2014 World Rowing Female Rower of the Year from the World Rowing Federation. At the 2014 Halberg Awards, she was a finalist in the Sportswoman of the Year category but lost to golfer Lydia Ko. In 2016, she won one of the Prime Minister's Sport Scholarships.

In the 2022 Queen's Birthday and Platinum Jubilee Honours, Twigg was appointed a Member of the New Zealand Order of Merit, for services to rowing.

== Personal life ==
Twigg met her wife Charlotte (née Mizzi) in 2018 through a mutual friend. They became engaged during summer 2019 after a year of dating and married in January 2020, with her wife taking on the family name Twigg. Fellow rower Lucy Spoors was one of the bridesmaids. Their marriage spurred Twigg to become an advocate for LGBTQIA+ athletes. Their son was born in April 2022.

Awards
Preceded by Rebecca Spence	Halberg Awards – Emerging Talent Award; 2007	Succeeded by Jossi Wells
