= Nina Kostanjšek =

Slovenian rower (born 1993)

Personal information
- Nationality: Slovenian
- Born: 4 June 1993 (age 33)
- Height: 176 cm (5 ft 9 in)

Sport
- Sport: Rowing
- Event: Sculls
Medal record
Women's rowing
Representing Slovenia
Mediterranean Games
Bronze medal – third place	2026 Taranto	Single sculls

Nina Kostanjšek (born 4 June 1993) is a Slovenian rower. She competed at the 2024 Paris Olympics.

== Career ==
She came to rowing late, and is a trained dentist. She became national champion in 2017, and her first international appearances for the national team of Slovenia include the 2018 Mediterranean Games, and at the European Rowing Championships in 2020 and 2022. She competed at the 2022 World Rowing Championships in the Women's single sculls in the Czech Republic.

She competed at the 2023 World Rowing Championships in the single sculls in Belgrade. She reached the final of the single sculls at the 2024 European Rowing Championships in Szeged. She was selected to compete at the 2024 Paris Olympics in the single sculls. She qualified for the quarter finals.
