= Elis Özbay =

Turkish rower (born 2001)

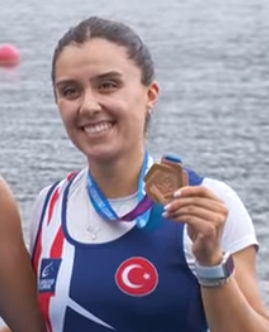
- At the 2025 World University Games

Personal information
- Nationality: Turkish
- Born: 24 July 2001 (age 25)
- Education: Logistics management at Yeditepe University
- Height: 1.73 m (5 ft 8 in)

Sport
- Country: Turkey
- Sport: Rowing
- Events: Lightweight single sculls (LW1x), double sculls (LW2x)
- Club: Fenerbahçe Rowing
Medal record
Women's Rowing
Representing Turkey
World Rowing Cup
Bronze medal – third place	2021 Zagreb	LW1x
World University Games
Bronze medal – third place	2025 Rhine-Ruhr	Single sculls
World U23 Championships
Gold medal – first place	2021 Račice	LW2x
Gold medal – first place	2023 Plovdiv	LW1x
Silver medal – second place	2022 Varese	LW1x
European U23 Championships
Gold medal – first place	2021 Kruszwica	BLW2x
Gold medal – first place	2022 Heindonk	BLW1x
European Universities Championships
Gold medal – first place	2022 Istanbul	LW1x
Mediterranean Games
Silver medal – second place	2026 Taranto	W2x

Elis Özbay (born 24 July 2001) is a Turkish rower competing in the lightweight single sculls and double sculls events. She participated at the 2024 Olympics in Paris, France, as the first Turkish female rower.

== Career ==
In her youth years, Özbay played volleyball five years long. She then switched over to rowing with the encouragement of her physical education teacher in the school. She entered Academy of Fenerbahçe Rowing. In the beginning, she found this sport hard because her hands were wounded while rowing. For her development, the club imported a carbon fiber racing shell from Italy worth €20,000.

Özbay is 1.73 m (5 ft 8 in) tall.

=== 2021 ===
At the 2021 World Rowing Cup in Zagreb, Croatia, Özbay won the bronze medal in the lightweight single sculls (LW1x) event.

She claimed the gold medal in the Lightweight Double Sculls (LW2x) event at the 2021 World Rowing U23 Championships in Račice, Czech Republic.

She captured the gold medal with her teammate in the Lightweight Double Sculls (BLW2x) event at the 2021 European Rowing U23 Championships in Kruszwica, Poland.

=== 2022 ===
She won the silver medal in the Lightweight Single Sculls (LW1x) event at the 2022 World Rowing U23 Championships in Varese, Italy.

She became champion in the Lightweight Single Sculls (BLW1x) event at the 2022 European Rowing U23 Championships in Heindonk, Belgium.

At the 2022 European Universities Rowing Championships in Golden Horn, Istanbul, Turkey, she became champion in the lightweight single sculls event.

=== 2023 ===
At the Croatia Open 2023 in Zagreb, Croatia, Özbay took the silver medal in the single sculls (SWA1x) event.

She finished the Final E of the single sculls event at the 2023 World Rowing Championships in Belgrade, Serbia as runner-up ranking 26 in total.

She won the gold medal in the Lightweght Single Scull event at the 2023 World Rowing U23 Championships in Plovdiv, Bulgaria.

=== 2024 ===
Özbay received the bronze medal in the single sculls event at the 2024 Croatia Open in Zagreb, Croatia.

She competed at the Final Qualification Regatta in Lucerne, Switzerland in May 2024.According to her ranking, she qualified to represent her country at the 2024 Olympics in Paris, France, as the first Turkish female rower.

== Personal life ==
Elis Özbay was born to Efsun and Salih Özbay on 24 July 2001.

She is a student of logistics management at Yeditepe University.
