= European Universities Rowing Championships =

The European Universities Rowing Championships were first organised in 2005 and were held annually until 2011. In 2012 the first European Universities Games (a multi-sport event) were held, and thereafter the Games will take place in even years, with the European Universities Championships in individual sports (including rowing) taking place in odd years.

The European Universities Rowing Championships are coordinated by the European University Sports Association along with the 18 other sports on the program of the European universities championships.

== Summary ==
| Edition | Year | Location | Nb of countries | Nb of universities | Nb of participants |
|---|---|---|---|---|---|
| 1st European Universities Rowing Championships | 2005 | Great Britain; Cardiff | 11 | * | 287 |
| 2nd European Universities Rowing Championships | 2006 | France; Brive | 13 | 52 | 350 |
| 3rd European Universities Rowing Championships | 2007 | Spain; Girona | 13 | 60 | 336 |
| 4th European Universities Rowing Championships | 2008 | Croatia; Zagreb | 14 | 49 | 406 |
| 5th European Universities Rowing Championships | 2009 | Poland; Kruwica | 14 | 66 | 410 |
| 6th European Universities Rowing Championships | 2010 | Netherlands; Amsterdam | 13 | 70 | 443 |
| 7th European Universities Rowing Championships | 2011 | Russia; Moscow | 15 | 54 | 383 |
| 1st European Universities Games | 2012 | Spain; Cordoba | No rowing scheduled | | |
| 8th European Universities Rowing Championships | 2013 | Poland; Poznan | 14 | 61 | 400 |
| 2nd European Universities Games | 2014 | Netherlands; Rotterdam | 13 | 47 | 328 |
| 9th European Universities Rowing Championships | 2015 | Germany; Hannover | * | * | * |
| 3rd European Universities Games | 2016 | Croatia; Zagreb & Rijeka | * | * | * |
| 10th European Universities Rowing Championships | 2017 | Serbia; Subotica | * | * | * |
| 4th European Universities Games | 2018 | Portugal; Coimbra | * | * | * |
| 11th European Universities Rowing Championships | 2019 | Sweden; Jönköping | * | * | * |
| 5th European Universities Games | 2020 | Serbia; Belgrade | Postponed until summer 2021, due to the COVID-19 outbreak | | |

== Results 2005 - Cardiff ==
| Category | | Winner | Silver Medallist | Bronze Medallist | Bronze Medallist |
|---|---|---|---|---|---|
| Men | LM2x | University of Maastricht; Netherlands | * | * | * |
| Men | M2x | University of Zagreb; Croatia | * | * | * |
| Men | M2- | University of Belgrade; Serbia | * | * | * |
| Men | LM4- | University of Utrecht; Netherlands | * | * | * |
| Men | M4x | University of Kassel; Germany | * | * | * |
| Men | M4- | Karlsruhe Institute of Technology; Germany | * | * | * |
| Men | M8 | Charles University in Prague; Czech Republic | * | * | * |
| Women | LW2x | University of Amsterdam; Netherlands | * | * | * |
| Women | W2x | University of Freiburg; Germany | * | * | * |
| Women | W2- | University of Oxford; Great Britain | * | * | * |
| Women | W4x | University of Hannover; Germany | * | * | * |
| Women | W4- | University of Nottingham; Great Britain | * | * | * |
| Women | W8 | University of Oxford; Great Britain | * | * | * |

== Results 2006 - Brive ==
| Category | | Winner | Silver Medallist | Bronze Medallist | Bronze Medallist |
|---|---|---|---|---|---|
| Men | LM2x | State University of Physical Education in Moscow; Russia | * | * | * |
| Men | M2x | University of Vienna; Austria | * | * | * |
| Men | M2- | Imperial College; Great Britain | * | * | * |
| Men | LM4- | University of Tilburg; Netherlands | * | * | * |
| Men | M4x | University of Newcastle; Great Britain | * | * | * |
| Men | M4- | University of Hamburg; Germany | * | * | * |
| Men | M8+ | Czech Technical University of Prague; Czech Republic | * | * | * |
| Women | LW2x | University Of Poznan; Poland | * | * | * |
| Women | W2x | University Of Zurich; Switzerland | * | * | * |
| Women | W2- | Imperial London University; Great Britain | * | * | * |
| Women | W4x | University Of Utrecht; Netherlands | * | * | * |
| Women | W4- | University Of Southampton; Great Britain | * | * | * |
| Women | W8+ | University Of Amsterdam; Netherlands | * | * | * |

== Results 2007 - Girona/Banyoles ==
| Category | | Winner | Silver Medallist | Bronze Medallist |
|---|---|---|---|---|
| Men | M1x | Stuttgart University; Germany | University of Vienna; Austria | Université de Lille 1 – SUAPS; France |
| Men | LM1x | University of Darmstadt; Germany | Imperial College / UL; Great Britain | IUT le Creusot; France |
| Men | LM2x | University of Karlsruhe; Germany | University of Vienna; Austria | Durham University; Great Britain |
| Men | M2x | University of Vienna; Austria | University of Dresden; Germany | Imperial College / UL; Great Britain |
| Men | M2- | University of Girona; Spain | University of Linz; Austria | University of Hamburg; Germany |
| Men | M4- | Bristol University; Great Britain | University of Karlsruhe; Germany | CUS Milano; Italy |
| Men | M4x | University of Vienna; Austria | Kassel University; Germany | University of Girona; Spain |
| Men | LM4- | Durham University; Great Britain | Technical Delft University; Netherlands | University of Birmingham; Great Britain |
| Men | LM4x | University of Linz; Austria | Loughborough University; Great Britain | Durham University; Great Britain |
| Men | M8+ | Czech University of Technology; Czech Republic | Hamburg University; Germany | Newcastle University; Great Britain |
| Women | LW1x | Giessen University S.F. Germany | University of Sevilla; Spain | University of Vienna; Austria |
| Women | W1x | University of Koln; Germany | CUS Milano; Italy | University of Zurich; Switzerland |
| Women | LW2x | University of Girona; Spain | Adam Mickiewicz University; Poland | Amsterdam University; Netherlands |
| Women | W2x | CUS Milano; Italy | Newcastle University; Great Britain | Berlin University S.F. Germany |
| Women | W2- | Durham University; Great Britain | Technical Delft University; Netherlands | Nancy 2 University; France |
| Women | LW4x | Durham University; Great Britain | Adam Mickiewicz University; Poland | CUS Milano; Italy |
| Women | W4x | Berlin University; Germany | Lyon I University; France | West of England University; Great Britain |
| Women | W4- | Heidelberg University; Germany | Birmingham University; Great Britain | Oxford Brookes University; Great Britain |
| Women | W8+ | Groningen University; Netherlands | University of Zurich; Switzerland | Cambridge University; Great Britain |

== Results 2008 - Zagreb ==
| Category | | Winner | Silver Medallist | Bronze Medallist |
|---|---|---|---|---|
| Men | M1x | University of Economics; Poland | University of Zagreb; Croatia | Lyon Superior Institute of Osteopathy; France |
| Men | LM1x | University of Szeged; Hungary | University of Karlsruhe; Germany | University of Zagreb; Croatia |
| Men | LM2x | University of Bydgoszcz; Poland | University of Hamburg; Germany | Adam Mickiewicz University; Poland |
| Men | M2x | University of Zagreb; Croatia | University of Economics; Poland | Leon Kozminski Academy Warsaw; Poland |
| Men | M2- | University of Karlsruhe; Germany | University of Zagreb I Croatia | University of Zagreb II; Croatia |
| Men | M4- | University of Zagreb; Croatia | University of Economics; Poland | University of Hamburg; Germany |
| Men | M4x | University of Milano; Italy | University of Hannover; Germany | University of Nottingham; Great Britain |
| Men | LM4- | University of Bydgoszcz; Poland | University of Amsterdam; Netherlands | University of Oxford; Great Britain |
| Men | LM4x | University of Mainz; Germany | University of Vienna; Austria | Loughborough University; Great Britain |
| Men | M8+ | University of Economics; Poland | University of Bydgoszcz; Poland | University of Zagreb; Croatia |
| Women | LW1x | University of Vienna; Austria | University of Rijeka; Croatia | University of Koln; Germany |
| Women | W1x | University of Karlsruhe; Germany | University of Vienna; Austria | University of Milano; Italy |
| Women | LW2x | Adam Mickiewicz University; Poland | University of Economics; Poland | University of Hannover; Germany |
| Women | W2x | University of Vienna; Austria | University Pays Basque; Spain | University of Newcastle; Great Britain |
| Women | W2- | University of VU Amsterdam; Netherlands | University of Economics; Poland | Imperial College; Great Britain |
| Women | LW4x | Adam Mickiewicz University; Poland | Imperial College; Great Britain | University of Milano; Italy |
| Women | W4x | University of Mainz; Germany | University of Vienna; Austria | University of Pays Basque; Spain |
| Women | W4- | University of Economics; Poland | Heidelberg University; Germany | University of Groningen; Netherlands |
| Women | W8+ | University of Zurich; Switzerland | University of Utrecht; Netherlands | University of Groningen; Netherlands |

== Results 2009 - Kruszwica ==
| Category | | Winner | Silver Medallist | Bronze Medallist |
|---|---|---|---|---|
| Men | M1x | University of Economy Bydgoszcz; Poland | * | * |
| Men | LM1x | University of Economy Bydgoszcz; Poland | * | * |
| Men | LM2x | University of Economy Bydgoszcz; Poland | * | * |
| Men | M2- | Karlsruhe University; Germany | * | * |
| Men | M2x | Poznan University of Life Science; Poland | * | * |
| Men | M4- | University of Economy Bydgoszcz; Poland | * | * |
| Men | M4x | University of Economy Bydgoszcz; Poland | * | * |
| Men | LM4- | University of Economy Bydgoszcz; Poland | * | * |
| Men | M8+ | University of Economy Bydgoszcz; Poland | * | * |
| Women | LW1x | Adam Mickiewicz University Poznan; Poland | * | * |
| Women | W1x | College of Education and Administration Poznan; Poland | * | * |
| Women | LW2x | University of Economy Bydgoszcz; Poland | * | * |
| Women | W2x | University of Basque Country; Spain | * | * |
| Women | W2- | Edinburgh University; Great Britain | * | * |
| Women | LW4x | University of Economy Bydgoszcz; Poland | * | * |
| Women | W4x | University of Basque Country; Spain | * | * |
| Women | W4- | University of Economy of Bydgoszcz; Poland | * | * |
| Women | W8+ | University of Bydgoszcz; Poland | * | * |

== Results 2010 - Amsterdam ==
| Category | | Winner | Silver Medallist | Bronze Medallist |
|---|---|---|---|---|
| Men | M1x | University of Hertfordshire; Great Britain | * | * |
| Men | LM1x | Police Academy Lower Saxony; Germany | * | * |
| Men | LM2- | University of Vienna; Austria | * | * |
| Men | LM2x | University of Economy Bydgoszcz; Poland | * | * |
| Men | M2- | University of Bochum; Germany | * | * |
| Men | M2x | Poznan University of Life Science; Poland | * | * |
| Men | M4- | Kazimierz Wielki University; Poland | * | * |
| Men | M4x | Bremen Universities; Germany | * | * |
| Men | LM4x | University of Mainz; Germany | * | * |
| Men | LM4- | Kazimierz Wielki University; Poland | * | * |
| Men | LM8+ | University of Nottingham; Great Britain | * | * |
| Men | M8+ | University of Zagreb; Croatia | * | * |
| Women | LW1x | Kiel University; Germany | * | * |
| Women | W1x | University of Passau; Germany | * | * |
| Women | LW2x | University of Economy Bydgoszcz; Poland | * | * |
| Women | W2x | University of Economy Bydgoszcz; Poland | * | * |
| Women | W2- | Hamburg Universities; Germany | * | Eindhoven University of Technology; Netherlands |
| Women | LW4x | University of Heidelberg; Germany | University of London; Great Britain | Oxford University; Great Britain |
| Women | W4x | University of Economy Bydgoszcz; Poland | * | * |
| Women | W4- | Oxford Brooks University; Great Britain | * | * |
| Women | LW8+ | Oxford University; Great Britain | * | * |
| Women | W8+ | Hamburg Universities; Germany | * | * |

== Results 2011 - Moscow ==
| Category | | Winner | Silver Medallist | Bronze Medallist |
|---|---|---|---|---|
| Men | M1x | Beuth Berlin; Germany | Moscow Aviation Institute; Russia | University of Coimbra; Portugal |
| Men | LM1x | WG Damstadt; Germany | St Petersberg State Marine TU; Russia | Klaipeda University; Lithuania |
| Men | LM2x | University of Wurzberg; Germany | University of Zurich; Switzerland | University of Vienna; Austria |
| Men | LM2- | University of Wurzburg; Germany | University of Twente; Netherlands | Nottingham Trent University; Great Britain |
| Men | M2x | University of East London; Great Britain | University of Osnabruck; Germany | University of Zagreb; Croatia |
| Men | M2- | University of Tourism, Economy and Law; Ukraine | WG Karlsruhe; Germany | Moscow State Regional Socio-Humanitarian institute Russia |
| Men | M4- | University of Economy Bydgoszcz; Poland | University of Vienna; Austria | KW Bydgoszcz; Poland |
| Men | M4x | University of Bremen; Germany | Moscow Aviation Institute; Russia | Reading University; Great Britain |
| Men | LM4- | WG Hamburg; Germany | University of Coimbra; Portugal | KW Bydgoszcz; Poland |
| Men | LM4x | Budapest University of Technology; Hungary | University of London; Great Britain | University of Hannover; Germany |
| Men | LM8 | WG Hamburg; Germany | Vrije Amsterdam; Netherlands | Nottingham Trent University; Great Britain |
| Men | M8+ | University of Economics; Poland | University of Bydgoszcz; Poland | University of Zagreb; Croatia |
| Women | LW1x | University of Heidelberg; Germany | Nottingham Trent University; Great Britain | University of Vienna; Austria |
| Women | W1x | Kuban State University of Physical Education, Sport and Tourism; Russia | University of Bath; Great Britain | Moscow PCSYT; Russia |
| Women | LW2x | University of Bremen; Germany | University of Economy Bydgoszcz A Poland | University of Economy Bydgoszcz B Poland |
| Women | W2x | University of Vienna; Austria | Moscow PCSYT; Russia | University of Mainz; Germany |
| Women | W2- | TU Dresden; Germany | Moscow TM; Russia | Reading University; Great Britain |
| Women | LW4x | Reading University; Great Britain | University of Economy Bydgoszcz; Poland | * |
| Women | W4x | Moscow PCSYT; Russia | WG Karlsruhe; Germany | University of Economy Bydgoszcz; Poland |
| Women | W4- | Kazan Federal University; Russia | University of London; Great Britain | University of Heildelberg; Germany |
| Women | W8+ | University of Hannover; Germany | Reading University; Great Britain | University of Groningen; Netherlands |

== Results 2013 - Poznan ==
| Category | | Winner | Silver Medallist | Bronze Medallist |
|---|---|---|---|---|
| Men | M1x | Poznan University of Life Sciences; Poland | University of Magdeburg; Germany | Robert Gordon University; Great Britain |
| Men | LM1x | University of Economy Bydgoszcz; Poland | University of Vienna; Austria | University of Frankfurt; Germany |
| Men | LM2x | University of Zürich; Switzerland | University of Hannover; Germany | Norwegian University of Science and Technology in Trondheim; Norway |
| Men | LM2- | University of Wurzburg; Germany | University of Twente; Netherlands | Nottingham Trent University; Great Britain |
| Men | M2x | Poznan University of Life Sciences; Poland | Poznan University of Life Sciences; Poland | Magnitogorsk State University; Russia |
| Men | M2- | TU Darmstadt; Germany | Klaipeda University; Lithuania | Durham University; Great Britain |
| Men | M4- | University of Vienna; Austria | University of Newcastle; Great Britain | TU Dresden; Germany |
| Men | M4x | University of Economy Bydgoszcz; Poland | University of Bremen; Germany | Poznan University of Life Sciences; Poland |
| Men | LM4- | Imperial College London; Great Britain | University of Würzburg; Germany | University of Amsterdam; Netherlands |
| Men | LM4x | University of Hamburg; Germany | University of Nottingham; Great Britain | University of Zürich; Switzerland |
| Men | M8+ | University of Zagreb; Croatia | University of Economy Bydgoszcz; Poland | Université de Lorraine; France |
| Women | LW1x | University of Vienna; Austria | University of Zagreb; Croatia | ABK Stuttgart National Academy of Art; Germany |
| Women | W1x | Kuban State University of Physical Education, Sport and Tourism; Russia | TU Berlin; Germany | Teesside University; Great Britain |
| Women | LW2x | University of Vienna; Austria | University of Bremen; Germany | Kazimierz Wielki University in Bydgoszcz; Poland |
| Women | W2x | University of Economy Bydgoszcz; Poland | Kazimierz Wielki University in Bydgoszcz; Poland | Imperial College London; Great Britain |
| Women | W2- | University of Bremen; Germany | Kuban State University of Physical Education, Sport and Tourism; Russia | Edinburgh University; Great Britain |
| Women | LW4x | University of Exeter; Great Britain | University of Vienna; Austria | Adam Mickiewicz University in Poznan; Poland |
| Women | W4x | University of Economy Bydgoszcz; Poland | Imperial College London; Great Britain | University of Hamburg; Germany |
| Women | W4- | Durham University; Great Britain | University of Zürich; Switzerland | University of Mainz; Germany |
| Women | W8+ | University of Newcastle; Great Britain | Université de Lorraine; France | University of Hamburg; Germany |

== Results 2014 - Rotterdam ==
| Category | | Winner | Silver Medallist | Bronze Medallist |
|---|---|---|---|---|
| Men | M1x | TU Dresden; Germany | Kaunas University of Technology; Lithuania | Tilburg University; Netherlands |
| Men | LM1x | University of Lucerne; Switzerland | University of Porto; Portugal | University of Liege; Belgium |
| Men | LM2x | TU Dortmund; Germany | Budapest University of Technology and Economics; Hungary | Swiss Federal Institute of Technology Zürich; Switzerland |
| Men | LM2- | University of Wurzburg; Germany | University of Twente; Netherlands | Nottingham Trent University; Great Britain |
| Men | M2x | Swiss Federal Institute of Technology Lausanne; Switzerland | Cardiff University; Great Britain | University of Liege; Belgium |
| Men | M2- | Szechenyi Istvan University; Hungary | Kadir Has University; Turkey | Erasmus University Rotterdam 1 Netherlands |
| Men | M4- | Newcastle University; Great Britain | Tilburg University; Netherlands | TU Dresden; Germany |
| Men | M4x | TU Berlin; Germany | Reading University; Great Britain | University of Würzburg; Germany |
| Men | LM4- | Imperial College London; Great Britain | University of Würzburg; Germany | University of Amsterdam; Netherlands |
| Men | LM4x | Utrecht University; Netherlands | Imperial College London; Great Britain | University of Hamburg; Germany |
| Men | M8+ | Szechenyi Istvan University; Hungary | Norwegian University of Science and Technology; Norway | University of Zagreb; Croatia |
| Women | LW1x | Swiss Federal Institute of Technology Zürich; Switzerland | Szechenyi Istvan University; Hungary | Loughborough University; Great Britain |
| Women | W1x | Cardiff University; Great Britain | Swiss Federal Institute of Technology Zürich; Switzerland | University of Zürich; Switzerland |
| Women | LW2x | Durham University; Great Britain | University of Bremen; Germany | University of Vienna; Austria |
| Women | W2x | University of Lausanne; Switzerland | Delft University of Technology; Netherlands | University of Bremen; Germany |
| Women | W2- | University of Lucerne; Switzerland | University of Bremen; Germany | Newcastle University; Great Britain |
| Women | LW4x | Oxford University; Great Britain | Tilburg University; Netherlands | University of Heidelberg; Germany |
| Women | W4x | University of Economy Bydgoszcz; Poland | Imperial College London; Great Britain | University of Hamburg; Germany |
| Women | W4- | Delft University of Technology; Netherlands | University of Bremen; Germany | Newcastle University; Great Britain |
| Women | W8+ | Newcastle University; Great Britain | Delft University of Technology; Netherlands | University of Zürich; Switzerland |

== Results 2018 - Coimbra ==
| Category | | Winner | Silver Medallist | Bronze Medallist |
|---|---|---|---|---|
| Men | M1x | Kanuas University; Lithuania | University Eastern Finland; Finland | Budapest UTE; Hungary |
| Men | LM1x | Slovak UTB; Slovakia | Reading University; Great Britain | Marmara University; Turkey |
| Men | LM2x | University Coimbra; Portugal | Marmara University; Turkey | Reading University; Great Britain |
| Men | LM2- | University Wageningen; Netherlands | University Notthingham; Great Britain | University Coimbra; Portugal |
| Men | M2x | Reading University; Great Britain | University Hannover; Germany | Eindhoven University; Netherlands |
| Men | M2- | Szechenyilstvan University; Hungary | University Stuttgart; Germany | Szechenyilstvan University; Hungary |
| Men | M4- | University Cambridge; Great Britain | University London; Great Britain | Kartsruhe IT; Great Britain |
| Men | M4x | University Bremen; Germany | Reading University; Great Britain | Univerzity Zürich; Switzerland |
| Men | LM4x | Karlsruhe IT; Germany | University Klagenfurt; Austria | University Bath; Great Britain |
| Men | LM4- | University Oxfordbr; Great Britain | Szechenyilstvan University; Hungary | University Lyon; France |
| Men | M8+ | Imperial college Great Britain | Delft University; Netherlands | Rhine-Westphalia ITA; Germany |
| Women | LW1x | University Porto; Portugal | Utrecht University; Netherlands | Corvinus UB; Hungary |
| Women | W1x | University Bochum; Germany | University Münster; Germany | Szechenyilstvan University; Hungary |
| Women | LW2x | University Porto; Portugal | University Wurzburg; Germany | University Twente; Netherlands |
| Women | W2x | University Duisburg-Essen; Germany | Reading University; Great Britain | Delft University; Netherlands |
| Women | W2- | Budapest UTE; Hungary | Utrecht University; Netherlands | Justus LUG; Germany |
| Women | LW4x | Delft University; Netherlands | University Wurzburg; Germany | Durham University; Great Britain |
| Women | W4x | Reading University; Great Britain | University Erlangen-Nuremberg; Germany | University Cambridge; Great Britain |
| Women | W4- | Delft University; Netherlands | University Twente; Netherlands | Imperial college Great Britain |
| Women | W8+ | University Bristol; Great Britain | University London; Great Britain | University Zagreb; Croatia |

== Results 2019 - Jönköping ==
| Category | | Winner | Silver Medallist | Bronze Medallist |
|---|---|---|---|---|
| Men | M1x | QU Belfast; Ireland | Eastern Finland; Finland | Jönköping; Sweden |
| Men | LM1x | UOE Bydgoszcz; Poland | Salzburg; Austria | Amsterdam; Netherlands |
| Men | LM2x | Tallinn; Estonia | MU Szczecin; Poland | Nottingham; Great Britain |
| Men | LM2- | Bochum; Germany | Glasgow; Great Britain | Vienna; Austria |
| Men | M2x | Jönköping; Sweden | Zagreb; Croatia | Hannover; Germany |
| Men | M2- | Stuttgart; Germany | Szechenyi; Poland | Tartu; Estonia |
| Men | M4- | Szechenyi; Hungary | Delft; Netherlands | Lyon; France |
| Men | M4x | Reading; Great Britain | Hannover; Germany | Szechenyi; Hungary |
| Men | LM4x | Lyon; France | Delft; Netherlands | Vienna; Austria |
| Men | LM4- | Rotterdam; Netherlands | Oxford; Great Britain | Hannover; Germany |
| Men | M8+ | IC London; Great Britain | Karlsruhe IT; Germany | Szechenyi; Poland |
| Women | LW1x | Bath; Great Britain | KWU Bydgoszcz; Poland | Basel; Switzerland |
| Women | W1x | Bochum; Germany | UPE Hungary; Hungary | Wuppertal; Germany |
| Women | LW2x | Utrecht; Netherlands | Karlsruhe IT; Germany | Petro MBS Ukraina; Ukraine |
| Women | W2x | Estonia; Estonia | Budapest; Hungary | Duisburg-Essen; Germany |
| Women | W2- | Budapest; Hungary | Giessen; Germany | Cambridge; Great Britain |
| Women | LW4x | Utrecht; Netherlands | Oxford; Great Britain | Amsterdam; Netherlands |
| Women | W4x | Reading; Great Britain | SFIT Zürich; Switzerland | Hamburg; Germany |
| Women | W4- | Linz; Austria | Hannover; Germany | IC London; Great Britain |
| Women | W8+ | Linz; Austria | SFIT Zürich; Switzerland | Erlangen-Nuremberg; Germany |
