= Alena Furman =

Belarusian rower

Personal information
- Born: Alena Kryvasheyenka; 8 May 1991 (age 35)

Sport
- Sport: Rowing
Medal record
Women's rowing
Representing Belarus
World Championships
Bronze medal – third place	2012 Plovdiv	Lwt single sculls
Bronze medal – third place	2025 Shanghai	Double sculls
European Championships
Gold medal – first place	2018 Glasgow	Lwt single sculls
Gold medal – first place	2019 Lucerne	Lwt double sculls
Gold medal – first place	2024 Szeged	Lwt single sculls
Gold medal – first place	2026 Varese	Double sculls

Alena Furman (née Kryvasheyenka, born 8 May 1991) is a Belarusian rower. She competed in the women's coxless pair event at the 2016 Summer Olympics.
