= Alison Bergin =

Irish rower (born 2002)

Personal information
- Born: 25 February 2002 (age 24) Waterford, County Waterford, Ireland
- Home town: Kildinan, County Cork, Ireland

Sport
- Country: Ireland
- Sport: Rowing
- Event: Double sculls
- Club: Fermoy Rowing Club
Medal record
Women's rowing
Representing Ireland
World U23 Championships
Bronze medal – third place	2022 Varese	W1x
Silver medal – second place	2023 Plovdiv	W1x

Alison Bergin (born 25 February 2002) is an Irish rower. She was selected for the 2024 Paris Olympics.

== Career ==
A member of Fermoy Rowing Club, she won a bronze medal in the single sculls at the 2022 World Rowing U23 Championships. The following year she upgraded her medal at the event, winning a silver in the single sculls in 2023.

Alongside Zoe Hyde she was a heat winner at the senior 2023 World Rowing Championships, before placing fourth overall in the double sculls. She was selected for the 2024 Paris Olympics with Hyde for the double sculls.

== Personal life ==
She is a student of sport and exercise management at Munster Technological University.
