= Lucy Glover =

British rower (born 1998)

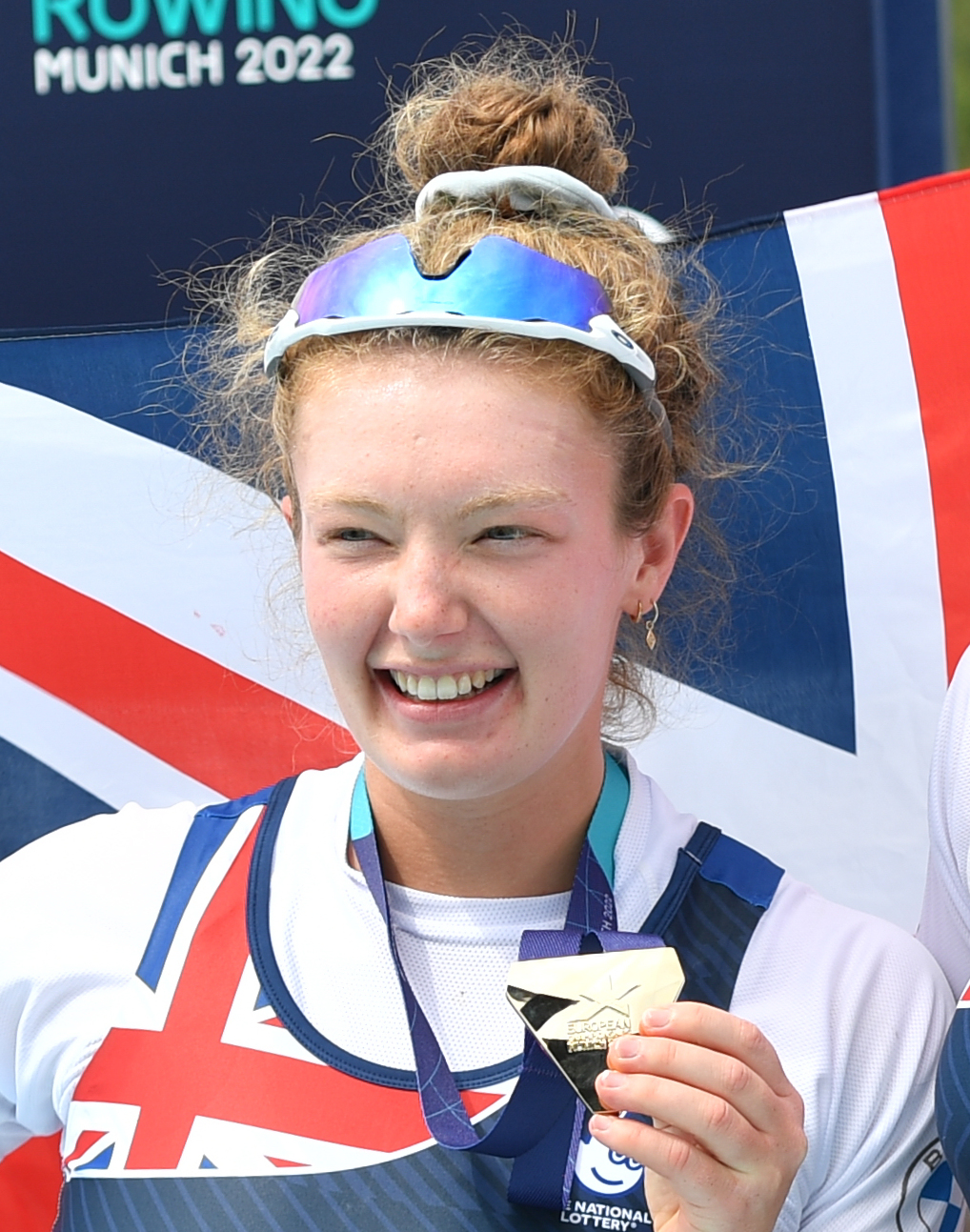
- Glover at the 2022 European Championships

Personal information
- Born: 25 November 1998 (age 27) Warrington, England
- Height: 169 cm (5 ft 7 in)

Sport
- Club: Warrington Rowing Club; Edinburgh University Boat Club
Medal record
Women's rowing
Representing Great Britain
World Championships
Bronze medal – third place	2022 Račice	Quadruple sculls
European Championships
Gold medal – first place	2022 Munich	Quadruple sculls
Silver medal – second place	2021 Varese	Quadruple sculls
Bronze medal – third place	2023 Bled	Quadruple sculls

Lucy Glover (born 25 November 1998) is a British rower. In 2021, she won a European silver medal in the quadruple sculls in Varese, Italy. She has been selected for the 2020 Summer Olympics.
