= Desislava Angelova =

Bulgarian rower (born 1997)

Personal information
- Nationality: Bulgarian
- Born: 16 October 1997 (age 27); Pleven, Bulgaria

Sport
- Sport: Rowing

Desislava Angelova (Bulgarian: Десислава Ангелова) (born 16 October 1997) is a Bulgarian rower. She competed at the 2024 Paris Olympics.

== Career ==
She placed seventh in the final of the Women's single sculls at the 2022 European Rowing Championships in Munich.

She placed reached the Women's single sculls final at the 2023 World Rowing Championships in Belgrade, placing fifth overall.

She placed fifth in the final of the 2024 European Rowing Championships single sculls in Szeged.

She competed at the 2024 Paris Olympics in the single sculls, and qualified for the quarter finals. She subsequently reached the final, finishing in sixth place.
