= Aurelia-Maxima Janzen =

Swiss rower (born 2003)

Aurelia-Maxima Katharina Janzen
Personal information
- Born: 27 December 2003 (age 22)

Sport
- Country: Switzerland
- Sport: Rowing
- Event: Single sculls
Medal record
Women's rowing
Representing Switzerland
European Championships
Silver medal – second place	2023 Bled	Single sculls
World U23 Championships
Gold medal – first place	2023 Plovdiv	Single sculls
Gold medal – first place	2025 Poznań	Single sculls
Silver medal – second place	2021 Račice	Single sculls
Silver medal – second place	2022 Varese	Single sculls
Silver medal – second place	2024 St. Catharines	Single sculls
European U23 Championships
Gold medal – first place	2022 Heindonk	Single sculls
Gold medal – first place	2023 Krefeld	Single sculls
Gold medal – first place	2024 Edirne	Single sculls
Gold medal – first place	2025 Račice	Single sculls
Silver medal – second place	2021 Kruszwica	Single sculls
World U19 Championships
Gold medal – first place	2021 Plovdiv	Single sculls
European U19 Championships
Gold medal – first place	2021 Munich	Single sculls

Aurelia-Maxima Katharina Janzen (born 27 December 2003) is a Swiss rower. She competed at the 2024 Paris Olympics.

== Career ==
She raced her first U23 champs aged 17 years-old. She won a gold at the 2021 World Rowing Junior Championships. She won gold at the 2022 European Rowing U23 Championships, and two silvers at the 2021 and 2022 World Rowing U23 Championships, all in the single scull.

She won the 2023 German Championships in Brandenburg. She won a silver medal at the 2023 European Rowing Championships in Bled, and also competed in 2024 in Szeged.

She secured a place at the Olympic Games with her performance in Lucerne in May 2024. She competed in the single sculls at the 2024 Paris Olympics, qualifying for the quarter finals.

At the World U23 Championships in Poland in July 2025, she won the single sculls by over 10 seconds from Greece’s Eleni Diavati and Australian Romy Cantwell.

== Personal life ==
She has dual citizenship of Switzerland and Germany. She favours the use of old fashioned Macon blades.
