= Tatsiana Klimovich =

Belarusian rower

Personal information
- Born: 19 January 1995 (age 31) Ivaki, Belarus
- Height: 177 cm (5 ft 10 in)
- Weight: 72 kg (159 lb)

Sport
- Sport: Rowing
Medal record
World Championships
Bronze medal – third place	2025 Shanghai	Double sculls
European Championships
Gold medal – first place	2026 Varese	Double sculls

Tatsiana Klimovich (born 19 January 1995) is a Belarusian rower. She competed in the 2020 Summer Olympics. Tatsiana is participating in 2024 Olympics in Paris as an individual independent athlete.
