= Jovana Arsić =

Serbian rower (born 1992)

Personal information
- Nationality: Serbia
- Born: 10 September 1992 (age 33) Novi Sad, FR Yugoslavia (modern Serbia)

Sport
- Country: Serbia
- Sport: Rowing
- Club: Partizan
- Coached by: Nikola Stojić
Medal record
Women's rowing
Representing Serbia
European Championships
Gold medal – first place	2024 Szeged	Single sculls
Bronze medal – third place	2023 Bled	Single sculls
Bronze medal – third place	2026 Varese	Single sculls
Mediterranean Games
Silver medal – second place	2026 Taranto	Single sculls

Jovana Arsić (born 10 September 1992) is a Serbian rower. She has competed in the 2020 and 2024 Summer Olympics.
