= Virginia Díaz Rivas =

Spanish rower (born 1991)

Virginia Díaz
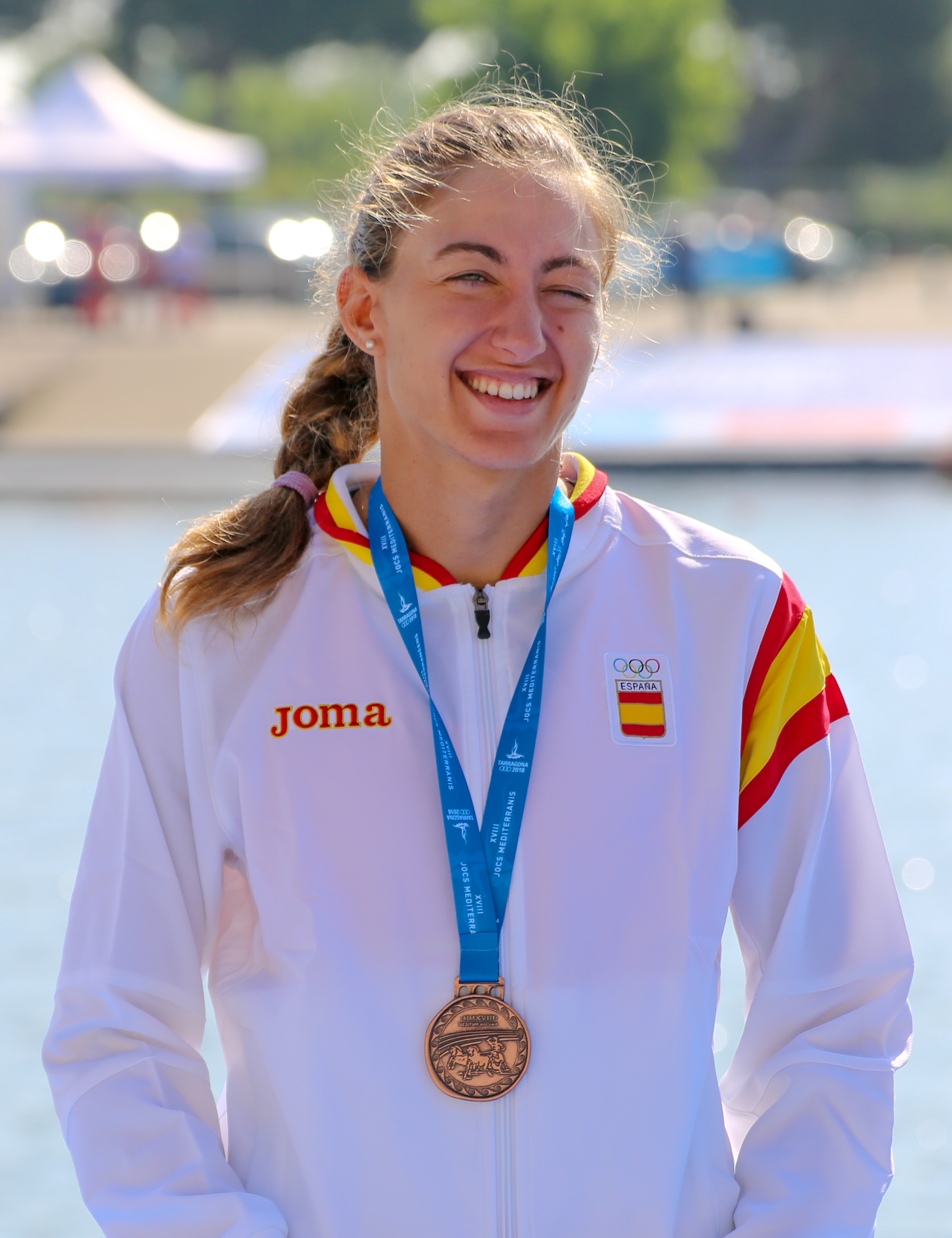
- Díaz at the 2018 Mediterranean Games

Personal information
- Full name: Virginia Díaz Rivas
- Nationality: Spanish
- Born: 14 August 1991 (age 34) El Astillero, Cantabria, Spain
- Height: 180 cm (5 ft 11 in)

Sport
- Sport: Rowing
Medal record
Women's rowing
Representing Spain
Mediterranean Games
Bronze medal – third place	2018 Tarragona	Single sculls
European Championships
Gold medal – first place	2019 Lucerne	Coxless pair
Silver medal – second place	2020 Poznan	Coxless pair
Bronze medal – third place	2021 Varese	Coxless pair

Virginia Díaz Rivas (Note: In this Spanish name, the first or paternal surname is Díaz and the second or maternal family name is Rivas.) (born 15 August 1991) is a Spanish rower. She competed in the women's coxless pair event at the 2020 Summer Olympics.

Alongside coxless pair partner Aina Cid, Díaz Rivas has won a gold, silver and bronze medal at the European Rowing Championships. She also placed fifth with Cid at the 2019 World Rowing Championships.
