= Alexandra Föster =

German rower (born 2002)

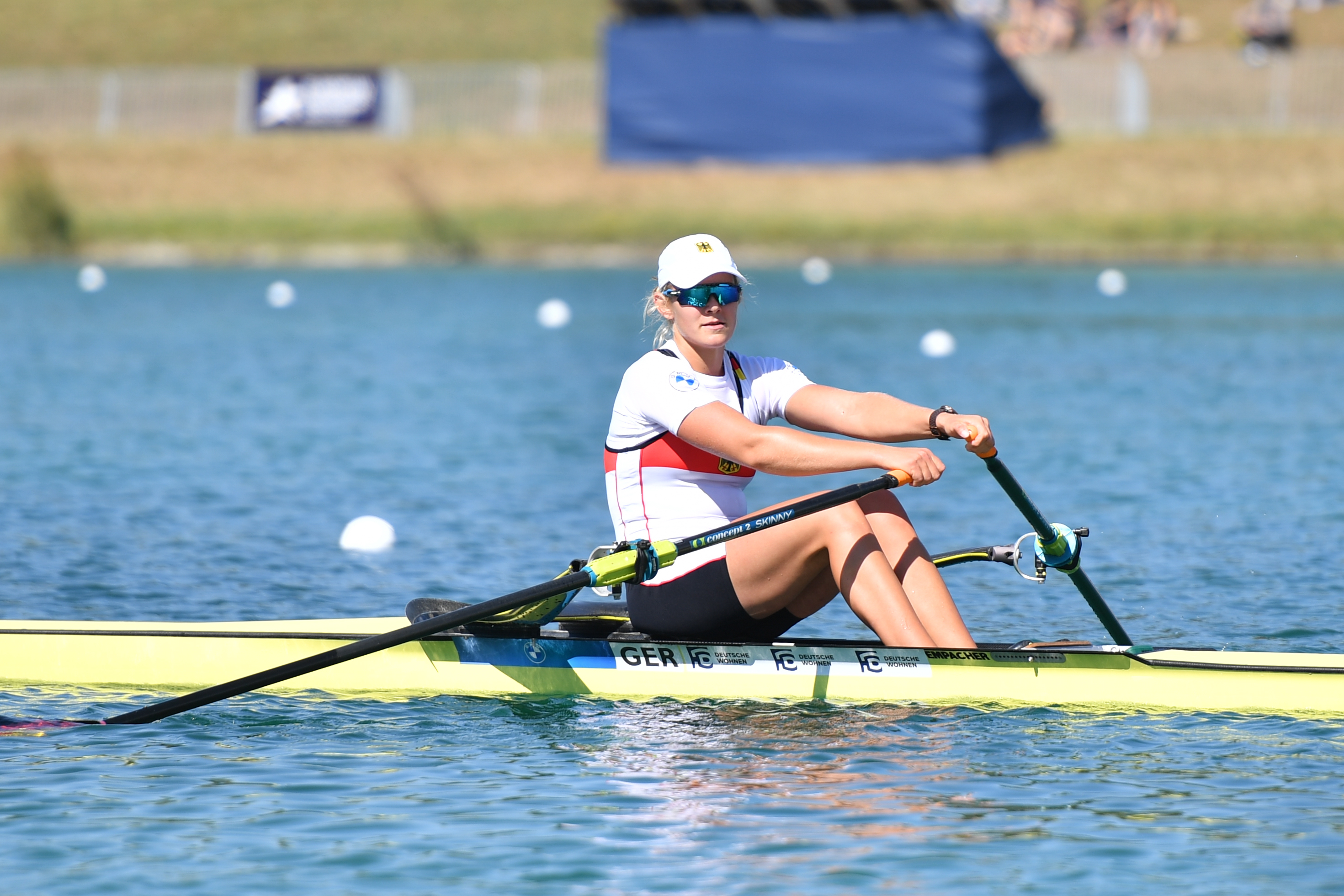

Personal information
- Born: 13 January 2002 (age 24) Meschede, Germany

Sport
- Sport: Rowing
Medal record
Women's rowing
Representing Germany
European Championships
Silver medal – second place	2024 Szeged	W1x
Bronze medal – third place	2022 Oberschleißheim	W1x
World University Games
Silver medal – second place	2025 Rhine-Ruhr	W1x
World U23 Championships
Gold medal – first place	2021 Račice	W1x
Gold medal – first place	2022 Varese	W1x
Gold medal – first place	2024 St. Catharines	W1x
European U23 Championships
Gold medal – first place	2020 Duisburg	W1x
World Junior Championships
Gold medal – first place	2019 Tokyo	JW1x
Silver medal – second place	2018 Račice	JW4x
European Junior Championships
Bronze medal – third place	2019 Essen	JW1x

Alexandra Föster (born 13 January 2002) is a German rower. She won a gold medal in the single scull at the World U23 Championships in 2021 and 2022 and a bronze medal at the 2022 European Rowing Championships.
