= Romania at the 2022 European Championships =

in (Germany) Munich 11 August 2022 – 22 August 2022
- Competitors: 89 in 8 sports
- Medals Ranked 9th: Gold 8 Silver 2 Bronze 5 Total 15

European Championships appearances
- 2018; 2022

Romania competed at the 2022 European Championships in Munich from August 11 to August 22, 2022.

== Medallists ==
Medal	Name	Sport	Event	Date
Gold	Ioana Vrinceanu; Denisa Tilvescu	Rowing	Women's coxless pair	13 August
Gold	Marius Cozmiuc; Sergiu Bejan	Rowing	Men's coxless pair	13 August
Gold	Ancuța Bodnar; Simona Radiș	Rowing	Women's double sculls	13 August
Gold	Ionela-Livia Cozmiuc	Rowing	Women's lightweight single sculls	14 August
Gold	Magdalena Rusu; Iuliana Buhus; Ancuța Bodnar; Denisa Tilvescu; Madalina Beres; Amalia Beres; Ioana Vrinceanu; Simona Radiș; Adrian Munteanu	Rowing	Women's eight	14 August
Gold	Bianca Ghelber	Athletics	Women's hammer throw	17 August
Gold	Bernadette Szőcs	Table tennis	Women's doubles	18 August
Gold	Cătălin Chirilă	Canoeing	Men's C–1 1000 metres	20 August
Silver	Ovidiu Ionescu; Bernadette Szőcs	Table tennis	Mixed doubles	15 August
Silver	Elizabeta Samara; Andreea Dragoman	Table tennis	Women's doubles	18 August
Bronze	Madalina Beres; Iuliana Buhus; Magdalena Rusu; Amalia Beres	Rowing	Women's coxless four	13 August
Bronze	Mihaita Țigănescu; Mugurel Semciuc; Stefan Berariu; Florin Lehaci	Rowing	Men's coxless four	13 August
Bronze	Mihai Chiruță; Ciprian Tudosa; Ioan Prundeanu; Marian Enache	Rowing	Men's quadruple sculls	13 August
Bronze	Adina Diaconu	Table tennis	Women's doubles	18 August
Bronze	Cătălin Chirilă	Canoeing	Men's C–1 500 metres	21 August

== Competitors ==
The following is the list of number of competitors in the Championships:

Sport	Men	Women	Total
Athletics	12	9	21
Gymnastics (men and women)	5	5	10
Canoe sprint	5	1	6
Cycling mountain bike	2	0	2
Cycling road	3	1	4
Cycling track	1	0	1
Rowing	21	13	34
Table tennis	5	6	11
Total	54	35	89

== Athletics ==
Romania entered the following athletes.

Key

- Q = Qualified for the next round
- q = Qualified for the next round as a fastest loser or, in field events, by position without achieving the qualifying target
- NR = National record
- PB = Personal best
- SB = Season best
- N/A = Round not applicable for the event

=== Men ===
Track and road events

Athlete	Event	Heat		Semifinal		Final	
Athlete	Event	Result	Rank	Result	Rank	Result	Rank
Mihai Sorin Dringo	400 m	Bye		47.06	22	Did not advance	
Alin Ionuţ Anton	110 m hurdles	14.18	23	Did not advance			
Ilie Corneschi	Marathon	—				2:18:59	38
Narcis Mihăilă	35 km walk	—				2:45:03	16
Marius Cocioran	35 km walk	—				DNF	

Field events

Athlete	Event	Qualification		Final	
Athlete	Event	Distance	Position	Distance	Position
Gabriel Bitan	Long jump	7.64	16	Did not advance	
Valentin Toboc	Long jump	NM		Did not advance	
Răzvan Cristian Grecu	Triple jump	16.44	9 q	NM	
Andrei Toader	Shot put	20.50	6 q	19.15	12
Alin Firfirică	Dscus throw	64.17	6 q	64.35	7
Alexandru Novac	Javelin throw	77.68	7 q	75.78	9
Denis Adrian Both	Javelin throw	74.62	18	Did not advance	

=== Women ===
Track and road events

Athlete	Event	Heat		Semifinal		Final	
Athlete	Event	Result	Rank	Result	Rank	Result	Rank
Claudia Bobocea	1500 m	4:03.63	4 Q	—		4:07.74	11
Claudia Prisecaru	3000 m steeplechase	9:43.51	10 Q	—		9:35.17	6
Mihaela Acatrinei	35 km walk	—				DNF	
Ana Veronica Rodean	35 km walk	—				DNF	

Field events

Athlete	Event	Qualification		Final	
Athlete	Event	Distance	Position	Distance	Position
Daniela Stanciu	High jump	1.83	14	Did not advance	
Alina Rotaru	Long jump	6.58	8 q	6.26	11
Florentina Iusco	Long jump	NM		Did not advance	
Elena Panțuroiu	Triple jump	14.00 SB	7 q	14.01 SB	8
Bianca Ghelber	Hammer throw	71.27	3 q	72.72	1st place, gold medalist(s)

== Gymnastics ==
Romania has entered five male and five female athletes.

=== Men ===
Qualification

Athlete	Event	Qualification								Final							
Athlete	Event	Apparatus						Total	Rank	Apparatus						Total	Rank
Athlete	Event	F	PH	R	V	PB	HB	Total	Rank	F	PH	R	V	PB	HB	Total	Rank
Gabriel Burtănete	Team															—	
Robert Burtănete	Team															—	
Răzvan-Denis Marc	Team															—	
Toma Roland Modoianu-Zseder	Team															—	
Andrei Muntean	Team															—	
Total	Team																

=== Women ===
Qualification

Athlete	Event	Qualification						Final					
Athlete	Event	Apparatus				Total	Rank	Apparatus				Total	Rank
Athlete	Event	V	UB	BB	F	Total	Rank	V	UB	BB	F	Total	Rank
Ana Bărbosu	Team											—	
Maria Ceplinschi	Team											—	
Andreea Preda	Team											—	
Silviana Sfiringu	Team											—	
Ioana Stănciulescu	Team											—	
Total	Team												
