= 2025 World Rowing Championships – Women's eight =

Women's eight at the 2025 World Rowing Championships
- Venue: Dianshan Lake
- Location: Shanghai, China
- Dates: 25–27 September
- Competitors: 91 from 10 nations
- Winning time: 6:08.10

Medalists
gold medal	Linn van Aanholt; Nika Johanna Vos; Lisanne Van Der Lelij; Vera Sneijders; Hermijntje Drenth; Ilse Kolkman; Ymkje Clevering; Tinka Offereins; Dieuwke Fetter	Netherlands
silver medal	Cristina Druga; Roxana Anghel; Iulia-Liliana Balauca; Maria Lehaci; Ancuța Bodnar; Dumitrița Juncănariu; Adriana Adam; Amalia Bereș; Victoria-Ștefania Petreanu	Romania
bronze medal	Eleanor Brinkhoff; Juliette Perry; Amelia Standing; Martha Birtles; Lauren Irwin; Eve Stewart; Heidi Long; Megan Slabbert; Jack Tottem	Great Britain

The women's eight competition at the 2025 World Rowing Championships took place at Dianshan Lake, in Shanghai.

== Schedule ==
The schedule was as follows:

Date	Time	Round
Thursday 25 September 2025	10:05	Heats
Saturday, 27 September 2025	13:41	Final B
Saturday, 27 September 2025	15:05	Final A

All times are UTC+08:00

== Results ==
=== Heats ===
The two fastest boats in each heat and the four fastest times advanced to the Final A.

==== Heat 1 ====
Rank	Rower	Country	Time	Notes
1	Cristina Druga; Roxana Anghel; Iulia-Liliana Balauca; Maria Lehaci; Ancuța Bodnar; Dumitrița Juncănariu; Adriana Adam; Amalia Bereș; Victoria-Ștefania Petreanu (c)	Romania	6:23.65	FA
2	Linn van Aanholt; Nika Johanna Vos; Lisanne Van Der Lelij; Vera Sneijders; Hermijntje Drenth; Ilse Kolkman; Ymkje Clevering; Tinka Offereins; Dieuwke Fetter (c)	Netherlands	6:27.10	FA
3	Georgie Gleeson; Katherine Easton; Sophie Houston; Ella Bramwell; Zara Collisson; Laura Gourley; Jamie Ford; Paige Barr; Hayley Verbunt (c)	Australia	6:29.02	FA
4	Brenna Randall; Cassidy Deane; Parker Illingworth; Alexis Cronk; Caroline de Paiva; Kristen Siermachesky; Sally Jones; Caileigh Filmer; Kristen Kit (c)	Canada	6:36.58	FB
5	Wei Qian; Xiao Huichen; Zhou Yuxiu; Xiong Jingran; Sangjizhuoma Sangjizhuoma; Wang Hong; Nie Zhenxue; Liu Si; Qiao Yafei (c)	China	7:07.41	FB

==== Heat 2 ====
Rank	Rower	Country	Time	Notes
1	Eleanor Brinkhoff; Juliette Perry; Amelia Standing; Martha Birtles; Lauren Irwin; Eve Stewart; Heidi Long; Megan Slabbert; Jack Tottem (M) (c)	Great Britain	6:27.72	FA
2	Michelle Lebahn; Lene Mührs; Olivia Clotten; Anna Härtl; Luise Bachmann; Tabea Schendekehl; Paula Hartmann; Nora Peuser; Florian Koch (M) (c)	Germany	6:29.42	FA
3	Alexandria Vallancey-Martinson; Kaitlyn Kynast; Charlotte Buck; Mia Levy; Anna Jensen; Etta Carpender; Hannah Heideveld; Megan Lee; Nina Castagna (c)	United States	6:30.73	FA
4	Stefania Gobbi; Giorgia Pelacchi; Clara Guerra; Kiri English-Hawke; Silvia Terrazzi; Aisha Rocek; Elisa Mondelli; Veronica Bumbaca; Emanuele Capponi (M) (c)	Italy	6:31.69	FB
5	Kornelia Mattik; Weronika Ludwiczak; Julia Hakobyan; Kamila Jasinska; Rozalia Linowska; Paulina Zietarska; Anna Potrzuska; Barbara Stepien; Julia Wisniewska (c)	Poland	6:44.73	FB

=== Finals ===
The A final determined the rankings for places 1 to 6. Additional rankings were determined in the other finals.

==== Final B ====
Rank	Rower	Country	Time	Notes
1	Cassidy Deane; Alexis Cronk; Parker Illingworth; Kristen Siermachesky; Caroline de Paiva; Alizée Brien; Sally Jones; Caileigh Filmer; Kristen Kit (c)	Canada	6:16.14	7
2	Stefania Gobbi; Giorgia Pelacchi; Clara Guerra; Kiri English-Hawke; Silvia Terrazzi; Aisha Rocek; Elisa Mondelli; Veronica Bumbaca; Emanuele Capponi (M) (c)	Italy	6:18.38	8
3	Kornelia Mattik; Weronika Ludwiczak; Julia Hakobyan; Kamila Jasinska; Rozalia Linowska; Paulina Zietarska; Anna Potrzuska; Barbara Stepien; Julia Wisniewska (c)	Poland	6:33.33	9
4	Wei Qian; Xiao Huichen; Zhou Yuxiu; Xiong Jingran; Sangjizhuoma Sangjizhuoma; Wang Hong; Nie Zhenxue; Liu Si; Qiao Yafei (c)	China	6:48.56	10

==== Final A ====
Rank	Rower	Country	Time
1st place, gold medalist(s)	Linn van Aanholt; Nika Johanna Vos; Lisanne Van Der Lelij; Vera Sneijders; Hermijntje Drenth; Ilse Kolkman; Ymkje Clevering; Tinka Offereins; Dieuwke Fetter (c)	Netherlands	6:08.10
2nd place, silver medalist(s)	Cristina Druga; Roxana Anghel; Iulia-Liliana Balauca; Maria Lehaci; Ancuța Bodnar; Dumitrița Juncănariu; Adriana Adam; Amalia Bereș; Victoria-Ștefania Petreanu (c)	Romania	6:10.83
3rd place, bronze medalist(s)	Eleanor Brinkhoff; Juliette Perry; Amelia Standing; Martha Birtles; Lauren Irwin; Eve Stewart; Heidi Long; Megan Slabbert; Jack Tottem (M) (c)	Great Britain	6:12.66
4	Michelle Lebahn; Lene Mührs; Olivia Clotten; Anna Härtl; Luise Bachmann; Tabea Schendekehl; Paula Hartmann; Nora Peuser; Florian Koch (M) (c)	Germany	6:12.83
5	Alexandria Vallancey-Martinson; Kaitlyn Kynast; Charlotte Buck; Mia Levy; Anna Jensen; Etta Carpender; Hannah Heideveld; Megan Lee; Nina Castagna (c)	United States	6:16.09
6	Georgie Gleeson; Katherine Easton; Sophie Houston; Ella Bramwell; Zara Collisson; Laura Gourley; Jamie Ford; Paige Barr; Hayley Verbunt (c)	Australia	6:19.01
