= 2026 World Rowing Championships – Women's eight =

Women's eight at the 2026 World Rowing Championships
- Venue: Bosbaan
- Location: Amsterdam, Netherlands
- Dates: 29–30 August
- Competitors: 90 from 10 nations
- Winning time: 5:51.88

Medalists
| gold medal | Cristina Drugă; Geanina Dumitrița Juncănariu; Ancuța Bodnar; Maria Lehaci; Maria-Magdalena Rusu; Amalia Chelaru; Adriana Adam; Simona Radiș; Victoria-Ștefania Petreanu | Romania |
| silver medal | Elizabeth Witt; Jade Lindo; Amelia Standing; Katherine George; Lauren Irwin; Eve Stewart; Heidi Long; Annie Campbell-Orde; Jack Tottem | Great Britain |
| bronze medal | Dahlia Levine; Megan Lee; Charlotte Buck; Jess Thoennes; Claire Collins; Camille Vandermeer; Alexandria Vallancey-Martinson; Etta Carpender; Nina Castagna | United States |

The women's eight competition at the 2026 World Rowing Championships took place at Bosbaan, in Amsterdam.

== Schedule ==
The schedule was as follows:

| Date | Time | Round |
|---|---|---|
| Saturday, 29 August 2026 | 16:33 | Heats |
| Sunday, 30 August 2026 | 14:15 | Final B |
| Sunday, 30 August 2026 | 15:07 | Final A |

All times are Central European Summer Time (UTC+2)

== Results ==
=== Heats ===
The two fastest boats in each heat and the two fastest times advanced to the Final A. Other crews to Final B.

==== Heat 1 ====
| Rank | Rower | Country | Time | Notes |
|---|---|---|---|---|
| 1 | Elizabeth Witt; Jade Lindo; Amelia Standing; Katherine George; Lauren Irwin; Eve Stewart; Heidi Long; Annie Campbell-Orde; Jack Tottem (M) (c) | Great Britain | 6:07.95 | FA |
| 2 | Cassidy Deane; Alexis Cronk; Kristen Siermachesky; Alex Pidgeon; Shaye de Paiva; Avalon Wasteneys; Maylie Valiquette; Sally Jones; Kristen Kit (c) | Canada | 6:10.07 | FA |
| 3 | Georgie Gleeson; Eliza Gaffney; Lily Triggs; Ella Bramwell; Samantha Morton van Eybergen; Paige Barr; Jaime Ford; Laura Gourley; Hayley Verbunt (c) | Australia | 6:12.99 | FB |
| 4 | Nora Peuser; Paula Hartmann; Olivia Clotten; Antonia Galland; Pia Greiten; Annabelle Bachmann; Luise Bachmann; Tabea Schendekehl; Florian Koch (M) (c) | Germany | 6:13.59 | FB |
| 5 | Clara Guerra; Giorgia Pelacchi; Angelica Merlini; Alice Gnatta; Silvia Terrazzi; Elisa Mondelli; Laura Meriano; Alice Codato; Emanuele Capponi (M) (c) | Italy | 6:15.45 | FB |

==== Heat 2 ====
| Rank | Rower | Country | Time | Notes |
|---|---|---|---|---|
| 1 | Dahlia Levine; Megan Lee; Charlotte Buck; Jess Thoennes; Claire Collins; Camille Vandermeer; Alexandria Vallancey-Martinson; Etta Carpender; Nina Castagna (c) | United States | 6:01.63 | FA |
| 2 | Cristina Drugă; Geanina Dumitrița Juncănariu; Ancuța Bodnar; Maria Lehaci; Maria-Magdalena Rusu; Amalia Chelaru; Adriana Adam; Simona Radiș; Victoria-Ștefania Petreanu (c) | Romania | 6:03.41 | FA |
| 3 | Claire de Kok; Vera Sneijders; Lisanne Van Der Lelij; Hannah Heideveld; Willemijn Mulder; Ilse Kolkman; Hermijntje Drenth; Bente Paulis; Dieuwke Fetter (c) | Netherlands | 6:07.11 | FA |
| 4 | Kate Haines; Ella Cossill; Rebecca Leigh; Stella Clayton-Greene; Veronica Wall; Alana Sherman; Isla Blake; Olivia Hay; Harrison Molloy (M) (c) | New Zealand | 6:11.11 | FA |
| 5 | Li Yahui; Wu Yongmei; Feng Shiyue; Li Bingjie; Zhu Chenyang; Sun Fengjiao; Zhao Zihe; Wu Yihui; Song Jiayi (c) | China | 6:22.05 | FB |

=== Finals ===
The A final determined the rankings for places 1 to 6. Additional rankings were determined in the other finals.

==== Final B ====
| Rank | Rower | Country | Time | Notes |
|---|---|---|---|---|
| 1 | Georgie Gleeson; Eliza Gaffney; Lily Triggs; Ella Bramwell; Samantha Morton van Eybergen; Paige Barr; Jaime Ford; Laura Gourley; Hayley Verbunt (c) | Australia | 5:58.00 | 7 |
| 2 | Clara Guerra; Giorgia Pelacchi; Angelica Merlini; Alice Gnatta; Silvia Terrazzi; Elisa Mondelli; Laura Meriano; Alice Codato; Emanuele Capponi (M) (c) | Italy | 6:00.62 | 8 |
| 3 | Nora Peuser; Paula Hartmann; Olivia Clotten; Antonia Galland; Pia Greiten; Annabelle Bachmann; Luise Bachmann; Tabea Schendekehl; Florian Koch (M) (c) | Germany | 6:00.87 | 9 |
| 4 | Li Yahui; Wu Yongmei; Feng Shiyue; Li Bingjie; Zhu Chenyang; Sun Fengjiao; Zhao Zihe; Wu Yihui; Song Jiayi (c) | China | 6:13.93 | 10 |

==== Final A ====
| Rank | Rower | Country | Time |
|---|---|---|---|
| 1st place, gold medalist(s) | Cristina Drugă; Geanina Dumitrița Juncănariu; Ancuța Bodnar; Maria Lehaci; Maria-Magdalena Rusu; Amalia Chelaru; Adriana Adam; Simona Radiș; Victoria-Ștefania Petreanu (c) | Romania | 5:51.88 |
| 2nd place, silver medalist(s) | Elizabeth Witt; Jade Lindo; Amelia Standing; Katherine George; Lauren Irwin; Eve Stewart; Heidi Long; Annie Campbell-Orde; Jack Tottem (M) (c) | Great Britain | 5:52.76 |
| 3rd place, bronze medalist(s) | Dahlia Levine; Megan Lee; Charlotte Buck; Jess Thoennes; Claire Collins; Camille Vandermeer; Alexandria Vallancey-Martinson; Etta Carpender; Nina Castagna (c) | United States | 5:53.76 |
| 4 | Claire de Kok; Vera Sneijders; Lisanne Van Der Lelij; Hannah Heideveld; Willemijn Mulder; Ilse Kolkman; Hermijntje Drenth; Bente Paulis; Dieuwke Fetter (c) | Netherlands | 5:55.02 |
| 5 | Cassidy Deane; Alexis Cronk; Kristen Siermachesky; Alex Pidgeon; Shaye de Paiva; Avalon Wasteneys; Maylie Valiquette; Sally Jones; Kristen Kit (c) | Canada | 6:00.26 |
| 6 | Kate Haines; Ella Cossill; Rebecca Leigh; Stella Clayton-Greene; Veronica Wall; Alana Sherman; Isla Blake; Olivia Hay; Harrison Molloy (M) (c) | New Zealand | 6:11.70 |
