= Romania at the 2018 European Championships =

- IOC code: ROU

in (United Kingdom) Glasgow (Germany) Berlin 2 August 2018 – 12 August 2018
- Competitors: 91 in 6 sports
- Medals Ranked 17th: Gold 3 Silver 4 Bronze 3 Total 10

European Championships appearances
- 2018; 2022

Romania competed at the inaugural 7 sports 2018 European Championships from 2 to 12 August 2018. It competed in 6 sports.

== Medallists ==
Medal	Name	Sport	Event	Date
Gold	Mădălina Bereș; Denisa Tîlvescu	Rowing	Woman's coxless pair	4 August
Gold	Ștefan Berariu; Ciprian Huc; Cosmin Pascari; Mihăiță Țigănescu	Rowing	Men's coxless four	4 August
Gold	Adriana Ailincăi; Viviana Iuliana Bejinariu; Mădălina Bereș; Daniela Druncea; Beatrice-Mădălina Parfenie; Iuliana Popa; Denisa Tîlvescu; Maria Tivodariu; Ioana Vrînceanu	Rowing	Women's eight	4 August
Silver	Iuliana Buhuș; Mădălina-Gabriela Cașu; Mădălina Hegheș; Roxana Parascanu	Rowing	Women's coxless four	4 August
Silver	Robert Glință	Swimming	Men's 50 metre backstroke	4 August
Silver	Marian Enache; Ioan Prundeanu	Rowing	Men's double sculls	5 August
Silver	Denisa Golgotă	Gymnastics	Women's floor exercise	5 August
Bronze	Marius Cozmiuc; Ciprian Tudosă	Rowing	Men's coxless pair	4 August
Bronze	Constantin Adam; Vlad Dragoș Aicoboae; Sergiu Bejan; Adrian Damii; Alexandru-Cosmin Macovei; Alexandru Matincă; Adrian Munteanu; Cristi Ilie Pîrghie; Constantin Radu	Rowing	Men's eight	5 August
Bronze	Denisa Golgotă	Gymnastics	Women's vault	5 August
