= Rowing at the 2024 Summer Olympics – Women's eight =

Women's eight at the Games of the XXXIII Olympiad
- Olympic rowing
- Venue: Stade nautique de Vaires-sur-Marne
- Dates: 29 July – 3 August 2024
- Competitors: 63 from 7 nations

Medalists
1st place, gold medalist(s)		Adriana Adam; Roxana Anghel; Amalia Bereș; Ancuta Bodnar; Maria-Magdalena Rusu; Maria Lehaci; Ioana Vrinceanu; Simona Radiș; Victoria-Ștefania Petreanu (cox)	Romania
2nd place, silver medalist(s)		Abigail Dent; Caileigh Filmer; Kasia Gruchalla-Wesierski; Maya Meschkuleit; Sydney Payne; Jessica Sevick; Kristina Walker; Avalon Wasteneys; Kristen Kit (cox)	Canada
3rd place, bronze medalist(s)		Annie Campbell-Orde; Holly Dunford; Emily Ford; Lauren Irwin; Heidi Long; Rowan McKellar; Eve Stewart; Harriet Taylor; Henry Fieldman (cox)	Great Britain

The women's eight event at the 2024 Summer Olympics took place from 29 July to 3 August 2024 at the Stade nautique de Vaires-sur-Marne, the National Olympic Nautical Stadium of Île-de-France in Vaires-sur-Marne. Seven nations were represented with one boat each; 56 rowers and 7 coxswains competed.

== Background ==
Women first competed in Olympic rowing at the 1976 Montreal Olympics and the eight was competed all Olympics since then, such that this was the thirteenth appearance of the event.

== Qualification ==
Each National Olympic Committee (NOC) is limited to a single boat in the event. There were seven qualifying places in the women's eight:

- 5 from the 2023 World Championship (Romania, Australia, the United States, Canada, and Great Britain)
- 2 from the final qualification regatta (Italy and Denmark)

== Schedule ==
The competition is scheduled over six days. Times given are session start times; multiple rowing events might have races during a session.

All times are Central European Time (UTC+2)

Date	Time	Round
Monday, 29 July 2024	12:00	Heats
Thursday, 1 August 2024	10:10	Repechage
Saturday, 3 August 2024	10:50	Final

== Rowers per team ==
Number	Rowers	Nation
1	Katrina Werry; Lucy Stephan; Jacqueline Swick; Georgina Rowe; Sarah Hawe; Giorgia Patten; Bronwyn Cox; Paige Barr; Hayley Verbunt	Australia
2	Abigail Dent; Caileigh Filmer; Kasia Gruchalla-Wesierski; Maya Meschkuleit; Sydney Payne; Jessica Sevick; Kristina Walker; Avalon Wasteneys; Kristen Kit (cox)	Canada
3	Veronica Bumbaca; Alice Codato; Linda De Filippis; Alice Gnatta; Elisa Mondelli; Giorgia Pelacchi; Aisha Rocek; Silvia Terrazzi; Emanuele Capponi (cox)	Italy
4	Annie Campbell-Orde; Holly Dunford; Emily Ford; Lauren Irwin; Heidi Long; Rowan McKellar; Eve Stewart; Harriet Taylor; Henry Fieldman (cox)	Great Britain
5	Magdalena Rusu; Roxana Anghel; Amalia Bereș; Ancuța Bodnar; Maria Lehaci; Adriana Adam; Ioana Vrînceanu; Simona Radiș; Victoria-Ștefania Petreanu (cox)	Romania
6	Frida Werner Foldager; Clara Hornnaess; Sara Johansen; Nikoline Laidlaw; Karen Mortensen; Caroline Munch; Nanna Vigild; Sofie Vikkelsoee; Sophie Østergaard (cox)	Denmark
7	Charlotte Buck; Molly Bruggeman; Olivia Coffey; Claire Collins; Margaret Hedeman; Meghan Musnicki; Regina Salmons; Madeleine Wanamaker; Nina Castagna (cox)	United States

== Results ==
=== Heats ===
==== Heat 1 ====
Rank	Lane	Nation	Time	Notes
1	2	Great Britain	6:16.20	Q
2	4	Australia	6:18.61	R
3	1	Canada	6:21.31	R
4	3	Denmark	6:39.30	R

==== Heat 2 ====
Rank	Lane	Nation	Time	Notes
1	1	Romania	6:12.31	Q
2	3	United States	6:19.00	R
3	2	Italy	6:28.47	R

==== Repechage ====
Rank	Lane	Nation	Time	Notes
1	2	United States	6:03.93	Q
2	4	Canada	6:04.81	Q
3	3	Australia	6:06.09	Q
4	1	Italy	6:09.65	Q
5	5	Denmark	6:22.21	

=== Final ===
Rank	Lane	Nation	Time	Notes
1st place, gold medalist(s)	3	Romania	5:54.39	
2nd place, silver medalist(s)	2	Canada	5:58.84	
3rd place, bronze medalist(s)	4	Great Britain	5:59.51	
4	6	Australia	6:00.73	
5	5	United States	6:01.73	
6	1	Italy	6:07.51	
