= 2024 European Rowing Championships =

2024 edition of the European Rowing Championships

- Venue: Regattabahn Szeged
- Location: Szeged, Hungary
- Dates: 25–28 April 2024 / 21 events

The 2024 European Rowing Championships were held from 25 to 28 April 2024 in Szeged, Hungary.

== Medal table ==
* Host nation (Hungary)

Rank	Nation	Gold	Silver	Bronze	Total
1	Great Britain	8	1	1	10
2	Romania	4	2	2	8
3	Italy	2	3	3	8
4	Norway	2	0	1	3
5	Germany	1	5	2	8
6	Ukraine	1	1	2	4
7	Switzerland	1	1	1	3
8	Austria	1	0	0	1
8	Serbia	1	0	0	1
–	Individual Neutral Athletes (AIN)	1	0	0	1
10	Greece	0	3	0	3
11	France	0	1	3	4
12	Lithuania	0	1	1	2
13	Belgium	0	1	0	1
13	Hungary*	0	1	0	1
13	Ireland	0	1	0	1
13	Spain	0	1	0	1
17	Czech Republic	0	0	2	2
18	Croatia	0	0	1	1
18	Netherlands	0	0	1	1
18	Poland	0	0	1	1
Totals (20 entries)		22	22	21	65

== Medal summary ==
=== Men ===
Event	Gold		Silver		Bronze	
Openweight events
M1x	Oliver Zeidler; Germany	7:38.47	Stefanos Ntouskos; Greece	7:41.36	Giedrius Bieliauskas; Lithuania	7:43.35
M2x	Romania; Andrei-Sebastian Cornea; Marian Enache	6:44.55	Spain; Aleix García; Rodrigo Conde	6:51.07	Germany; Jonas Gelsen; Marc Weber	6:51.49
M4x	Italy; Nicolò Carucci; Andrea Panizza; Luca Chiumento; Giacomo Gentili	6:03.93	Switzerland; Dominic Condrau; Jan Jonah Plock; Scott Bärlocher; Maurin Lange	6:04.66	Poland; Dominik Czaja; Mateusz Biskup; Mirosław Ziętarski; Fabian Barański	6:05.33
M2−	Great Britain; Oliver Wynne-Griffith; Thomas George	7:01.54	Romania; Florin Arteni; Florin Lehaci	7:03.88	Switzerland; Roman Röösli; Andrin Gulich	7:06.50
M4−	Great Britain; Oliver Wilkes; David Ambler; Matt Aldridge; Freddie Davidson	6:17.63	Italy; Matteo Lodo; Giovanni Abagnale; Giuseppe Vicino; Nicholas Kohl	6:20.27	France; Thibaud Turlan; Guillaume Turlan; Benoît Brunet; Téo Rayet	6:22.86
M8+	Great Britain; Sholto Carnegie; Rory Gibbs; Morgan Bolding; Jacob Dawson; Charles Elwes; Thomas Digby; James Rudkin; Thomas Ford; Harry Brightmore (cox)	5:52.90	Germany; Benedict Eggeling; Laurits Follert; Olaf Roggensack; Mattes Schönherr; Max John; Torben Johannesen; Wolf-Niclas Schröder; Hannes Ocik; Jonas Wiesen (cox)	5:55.23	Romania; Mihăiță Țigănescu; Ciprian Tudosă; Constantin Adam; Mugurel Semciuc; Florin Arteni; Sergiu Bejan; Ștefan Berariu; Florin Lehaci; Adrian Munteanu (cox)	5:56.11
Lightweight events
LM1x	Niels Torre; Italy	7:41.72	Marlon Colpaert; Belgium	7:54.83	Baptiste Savaete; France	7:55.10
LM2x	Switzerland; Jan Schäuble; Raphaël Ahumada	6:47.56	Italy; Stefano Oppo; Gabriel Soares	6:49.83	Norway; Lars Benske; Ask Tjøm	6:50.06
LM2-	Austria	Hungary	Not Awarded			
Pararowing events
PR1 M1x	Roman Polianskyi; Ukraine	9:38.87	Giacomo Perini; Italy	9:43.51	Benjamin Pritchard; Great Britain	9:48.87

=== Women ===
Event	Gold		Silver		Bronze	
Openweight events
W1x	Jovana Arsić; Serbia	8:23.42	Alexandra Föster; Germany	8:28.16	Alice Prokešová; Czech Republic	8:34.97
W2x	Norway; Thea Helseth; Inger Seim Kavlie	7:39.42	Lithuania; Donata Karalienė; Dovilė Rimkutė	7:41.50	Romania; Ancuța Bodnar; Simona Radiș	7:43.66
W4x	Great Britain; Lauren Henry; Hannah Scott; Lola Anderson; Georgina Brayshaw	6:41.19	Ukraine; Nataliya Dovgodko; Kateryna Dudchenko; Daryna Verkhogliad; Anastasiya Kozhenkova	6:43.02	Germany; Maren Völz; Lisa Gutfleisch; Leonie Menzel; Pia Greiten	6:46.63
W2−	Romania; Ioana Vrînceanu; Roxana Anghel	7:52.05	Greece; Evangelia Anastasiadou; Christina Bourmpou	8:00.87	Croatia; Ivana Jurković; Josipa Jurković	8:03.13
W4−	Great Britain; Helen Glover; Esme Booth; Samantha Redgrave; Rebecca Shorten	6:53.95	Romania; Mădălina Bereș; Maria Tivodariu; Maria-Magdalena Rusu; Amalia Bereș	6:55.47	Netherlands; Maartje Damen; Nika Vos; Ilse Kolkman; Willemijn Mulder	6:58.23
W8+	Romania; Maria-Magdalena Rusu; Roxana Anghel; Adriana Adam; Maria Tivodariu; Mădălina Bereș; Amalia Bereș; Ioana Vrînceanu; Simona Radis; Victoria-Ștefania Petreanu (cox)	6:32.00	Great Britain; Heidi Long; Rowan McKellar; Holly Dunford; Eve Stewart; Lauren Irwin; Emily Ford; Harriet Taylor; Annie Campbell-Orde; Henry Fieldman (cox)	6:35.16	Italy; Giorgia Pelacchi; Linda De Filippis; Alice Gnatta; Aisha Rocek; Alice Codato; Silvia Terrazzi; Elisa Mondelli; Veronica Bumbaca; Emanuele Capponi (cox)	6:37.41
Lightweight events
LW1x	Alena Furman; Individual Neutral Athletes (AIN)	8:32.17	Margaret Cremen; Ireland	8:42.96	Kristýna Neuhortová; Czech Republic	8:49.89
LW2x	Romania; Gianina van Groningen; Ionela Cozmiuc	7:29.63	Greece; Dimitra Eleni Kontou; Zoi Fitsiou	7:31.94	Italy; Valentina Rodini; Silvia Crosio	7:33.73
Para-rowing events
PR1 W1x	Birgit Skarstein; Norway	10:52.40	Manuela Diening; Germany	10:55.67	Nathalie Benoit; France	11:05.27

=== Mixed para-rowing events ===
Event	Gold		Silver		Bronze	
PR2 Mix2x	Great Britain; Gregg Stevenson; Lauren Rowles	9:15.19	Germany; Jasmina Bier; Paul Umbach	9:28.60	Ukraine; Anna Aisanova; Iaroslav Koiuda	9:28.98
PR3 Mix2x	Great Britain; Samuel Murray; Annabel Caddick	7:55.26	Germany; Hermine Krumbein; Jan Helmich	7:56.99	Ukraine; Dariia Kotyk; Stanislav Samoliuk	8:01.50
PR3 Mix4+	Great Britain; Francesca Allen; Joshua O'Brien; Giedrė Rakauskaitė; Edward Fuller; Erin Kennedy (cox)	7:35.67	France; Candyce Chafa; Rémy Taranto; Grégoire Bireau; Margot Boulet; Émilie Acquistapace (cox)	7:48.53	Italy; Carolina Foresti; Tommaso Schettino; Marco Frank; Greta Elizabeth Muti; Enrico D'Aniello (cox)	8:05.24
