= Dumitrița Juncănariu =

Romanian rower (born 2000)

Geanina Dumitrița Juncănariu
Personal information
- Full name: Geanina Dumitrița Juncănariu
- Nationality: Romanian
- Born: 9 October 2000 (age 26) Botoșani, Romania

Sport
- Country: Romania
- Sport: Rowing
Medal record
Women's rowing
Representing Romania
World Championships
Gold medal – first place	2026 Amsterdam	Eight
Silver medal – second place	2025 Shanghai	Coxless four
Silver medal – second place	2025 Shanghai	Eight
European Championships
Gold medal – first place	2026 Varese	Eight

Geanina Dumitrița Juncănariu (born 9 October 2000) is a Romanian rower.

== Career ==
=== Junior career ===
She won a silver medal in the women’s coxless four at the 2017 World Rowing Junior Championships in Trakai, Lithuania.

=== Under-23 career ===
She won gold at the 2019 European Rowing U23 Championships in Greece. They won gold again the following year, at the 2020 European Rowing U23 Championships in Duisburg, Germany in the coxless four. She also won a medal at the 2021 European Rowing U23 Championships in Poland.

She was a member of the Romanian women's four-man crew that won a bronze medal at the 2021 World Rowing U23 Championships in Račice, Czech Republic. She won gold as part of the Romanian coxless four at the 2022 European Rowing U23 Championships in Belgium.
