= Eve Stewart (rower) =

British rower (born 1998)

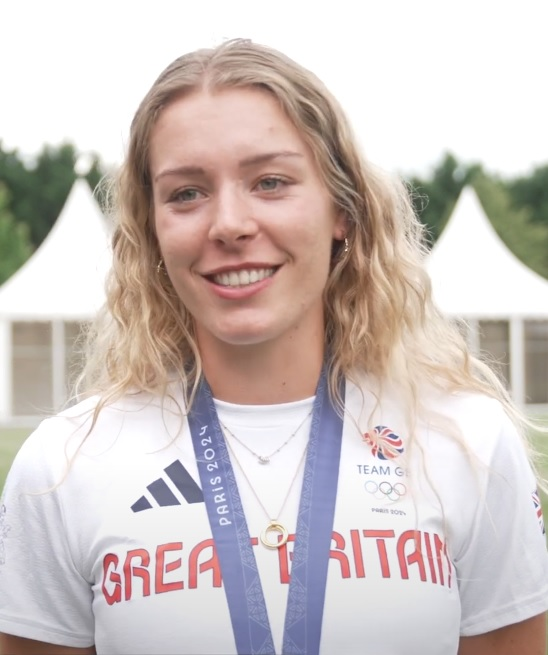
- Stewart at the 2024 Summer Olympics

Personal information
- Born: 13 January 1998 (age 28) Amsterdam, Netherlands

Sport
- Sport: Rowing
- Club: Leander Club
Medal record
Women's rowing
Representing Great Britain
Olympic Games
Bronze medal – third place	2024 Paris	Eight
World Championships
Silver medal – second place	2026 Amsterdam	Eight
Bronze medal – third place	2025 Shanghai	Eight
European Championships
Silver medal – second place	2024 Szeged	Eight
Silver medal – second place	2026 Varese	Eight

Eve Stewart (born 13 January 1998) is a British Athlete. She won a bronze medal at the Paris Olympics in the eight.

== Early life ==
Born and raised in the Netherlands, Stewart studied at the Amsterdam International Community School and the University of Iowa. She earned the bow seat of Iowa’s first varsity eight in her freshman year. That year, Iowa qualified for the NCAA finals for the first time in 16 years. The following season she was in the stroke position as they returned to the NCAA finals.

== Career ==
She was named in the U-23 Dutch National Team for the 2018 World Rowing Championships in Poznań, Poland.

In 2023, she rowed in a pair with Eleanor Brinkhoff and the duo finished fourth in the GB rowing team winter assessments.

She was named by Great Britain for the World Rowing Cup I in Varese, Italy in April 2024, to compete in the eight and the four. She won a silver medal as part of the eight. She was subsequently named for the silver medal winning women's eight at the 2024 European Rowing Championships in Szeged, Hungary.

She won a bronze medal as part of the Great Britain eight at the 2024 Summer Olympics. She is also the first University of Iowa rower to qualify for the Olympics and win a medal.

In August 2026, she was a silver medalist in the women's eight at the 2026 European Rowing Championships. She also won a silver medal at the 2026 World Rowing Championships in Amsterdam, in August 2026 as part of the Women's eight.

== Personal life ==
Her mother Rachel Stewart played netball for Wales and competed in the finals of the British Junior Dressage Championships. Her grandmother Pat Stewart, was from Yorkshire, and also known as the ex Tiller girl, ‘the Blackpool belle’, was a dancer and model whose photograph taken by Bert Hardy for the magazine Picture Post and became a hugely popular image, described as "a carefree snapshot of postwar Britain, one of the most memorable images of the 20th century".
