= 2023 European Rowing Championships =

2023 European Championships
- Venue: Lake Bled
- Location: Bled, Slovenia
- Dates: 25–28 May 2023 / 21 Events

The 2023 European Rowing Championships were held from 25 to 28 May 2023 in Bled, Slovenia.

== Medal table ==
* Host nation (Slovenia)

Rank	Nation	Gold	Silver	Bronze	Total
1	Great Britain	5	3	2	10
2	Romania	5	1	0	6
3	Netherlands	2	5	4	11
4	Switzerland	2	1	1	4
5	France	2	0	4	6
6	Italy	1	3	2	6
7	Ukraine	1	2	1	4
8	Croatia	1	0	0	1
8	Norway	1	0	0	1
8	Poland	1	0	0	1
11	Greece	0	3	1	4
12	Germany	0	1	2	3
13	Israel	0	1	0	1
13	Lithuania	0	1	0	1
15	Spain	0	0	2	2
16	Czech Republic	0	0	1	1
16	Serbia	0	0	1	1
Totals (17 entries)		21	21	21	63

== Medal summary ==
=== Men ===
Event	Gold		Silver		Bronze	
Openweight events
M1x	Lennart van Lierop; Netherlands	6:46.91	Stefanos Ntouskos; Greece	6:47.87	Oliver Zeidler; Germany	6:48.14
M2x	Croatia; Martin Sinković; Valent Sinković	6:07.00	Italy; Luca Rambaldi; Matteo Sartori	6:08.25	Netherlands; Stef Broenink; Melvin Twellaar	6:10.74
M4x	Poland; Dominik Czaja; Mateusz Biskup; Mirosław Ziętarski; Fabian Barański	5:40.24	Netherlands; Finn Florijn; Simon van Dorp; Tone Wieten; Koen Metsemakers	5:41.67	Italy; Nicolò Carucci; Andrea Panizza; Luca Chiumento; Giacomo Gentili	5:42.01
M2−	Switzerland; Roman Röösli; Andrin Gulich	6:22.34	Great Britain; Oliver Wynne-Griffith; Thomas George	6:22.44	Spain; Jaime Canalejo; Javier García	6:22.96
M4−	Great Britain; Oliver Wilkes; David Ambler; Matthew Aldridge; Freddie Davidson	5:49.34	Netherlands; Guus Mollee; Nelson Ritsema; Olav Molenaar; Gert-Jan van Doorn	5:52.24	France; Thibaud Turlan; Guillaume Turlan; Benoît Brunet; Téo Rayet	5:53.12
M8+	Great Britain; Rory Gibbs; Morgan Bolding; Jacob Dawson; Thomas Digby; Charles Elwes; Sholto Carnegie; James Rudkin; Thomas Ford; Henry Fieldman	5:28.09	Romania; Mihăiță Țigănescu; Ciprian Tudosă; Florin Arteni; Mugurel Semciuc; Marius Cozmiuc; Sergiu Bejan; Ștefan Berariu; Florin Lehaci; Adrian Munteanu	5:28.14	Netherlands; Nicolas van Sprang; Rik Rienks; Jan van der Bij; Ruben Knab; Sander de Graaf; Jacob van de Kerkhof; Ralf Rienks; Mick Makker; Dieuwke Fetter	5:28.61
Lightweight events
LM1x	Hugo Beurey; France	6:51.26	Niels Torre; Italy	6:51.81	Andri Struzina; Switzerland	6:57.25
LM2x	Switzerland; Jan Schäuble; Raphaël Ahumada	6:13.81	Italy; Stefano Oppo; Gabriel Soares	6:15.06	Greece; Petros Gaidatzís; Antonios Papakonstantinou	6:15.99
Pararowing events
PR1M1x	Giacomo Perini; Italy	8:55.08	Roman Polianskyi; Ukraine	9:00.19	Marcus Klemp; Germany	9:28.26

=== Women ===
Event	Gold		Silver		Bronze	
Openweight events
W1x	Karolien Florijn; Netherlands	7:24.18	Aurelia-Maxima Janzen; Switzerland	7:29.45	Jovana Arsić; Serbia	7:31.86
W2x	Romania; Ancuța Bodnar; Simona Radiș	6:40.83	Lithuania; Donata Karalienė; Dovilė Rimkutė	6:41.18	Netherlands; Roos de Jong; Laila Youssifou	6:45.98
W4x	Ukraine; Daryna Verkhohliad; Nataliya Dovhodko; Anastasiya Kozhenkova; Kateryna Dudchenko	6:19.12	Netherlands; Martine Veldhuis; Lisa Scheenaard; Ilse Kolkman; Tessa Dullemans	6:20.28	Great Britain; Lauren Henry; Hannah Scott; Georgina Brayshaw; Lucy Glover	6:22.13
W2−	Romania; Ioana Vrînceanu; Roxana Anghel	6:56.40	Netherlands; Ymkje Clevering; Veronique Meester	6:57.56	Spain; Aina Cid; Esther Briz Zamorano	7:03.56
W4−	Romania; Mădălina Bereș; Maria Tivodariu; Maria-Magdalena Rusu; Amalia Bereș	6:22.69	Great Britain; Heidi Long; Rowan McKellar; Helen Glover; Rebecca Shorten	6:23.72	Netherlands; Marloes Oldenburg; Benthe Boonstra; Hermine Drenth; Tinka Offereins	6:27.10
W8+	Romania; Maria-Magdalena Rusu; Roxana Anghel; Adriana Adam; Maria Tivodariu; Mădălina Bereș; Amalia Bereș; Ioana Vrînceanu; Simona Radiș; Victoria-Stefania Petreanu	6:01.55	Great Britain; Natasha Morrice; Emily Ford; Lauren Irwin; Karen Bennett; Esme Booth; Samantha Redgrave; Harriet Taylor; Annie Campbell-Orde; Henry Fieldman	6:08.01	Italy; Giorgia Pelacchi; Sofia Secoli; Veronica Bumbaca; Alice Gnatta; Elisa Mondelli; Silvia Terrazzi; Alice Codato; Linda De Filippis; Emanuele Capponi	6:13.07
Lightweight events
LW1x	Ionela Cozmiuc; Romania	7:32.43	Evangelia Anastasiadou; Greece	7:35.14	Kristyna Neuhortová; Czech Republic	7:40.29
LW2x	Great Britain; Emily Craig; Imogen Grant	6:52.32	Greece; Dímitra Eleni Kontou; Zoi Fitsiou	6:54.78	France; Laura Tarantola; Claire Bové	6:55.30
Para-rowing events
PR1 W1x	Birgit Skarstein; Norway	10:05.80	Moran Samuel; Israel	10:07.97	Nathalie Benoit; France	10:08.36

=== Mixed para-rowing events ===
Event	Gold		Silver		Bronze	
PR2Mix2x	Great Britain; Lauren Rowles; Gregg Stevenson	8:02.94	Netherlands; Corné de Koning; Chantal Haenen	8:08.87	Ukraine; Svitlana Bohuslavska; Iaroslav Koiuda	8:13.88
PR3Mix2x	France; Guylaine Marchand; Laurent Cadot	7:35.81	Ukraine; Dariia Kotyk; Stanislav Samoliuk	7:37.69	Great Britain; Annabel Caddick; Samuel Murray	7:43.68
PR3Mix4+	Great Britain; Francesca Allen; Giedrė Rakauskaitė; Morgan Fice-Noyes; Edward Fuller; Erin Kennedy (c)	6:52.50	Germany; Susanne Lackner; Jan Helmich; Marc Lembeck; Kathrin Marchand; Inga Thöne (c)	6:57.42	France; Erika Sauzeau; Gregoire Bireau; Remy Taranto; Margot Boulet; Émilie Acquistapace (c)	7:01.48
