= 2025 World Rowing Championships – Mixed eight =

Mixed eight at the 2025 World Rowing Championships
- Venue: Dianshan Lake
- Location: Shanghai, China
- Dates: 28 September
- Competitors: 90 from 10 nations
- Winning time: 5:34.46

Medalists
gold medal	Maria-Magdalena Rusu; Maria Lehaci; Andrada-Maria Moroșanu; Florin Lehaci; Florin Arteni; Ciprian Tudosă; Ștefan Berariu; Simona Radiș; Victoria-Ștefania Petreanu	Romania
silver medal	Laura Meriano; Elisa Mondelli; Aisha Rocek; Alice Codato; Giacomo Gentili; Andrea Panizza; Nunzio di Colandrea; Giovanni Codato; Alessandra Faella	Italy
bronze medal	Isla Blake; Juliette Lequeux; Rebecca Leigh; Flynn Eliadis-Watson; Campbell Crouch; Benjamin Taylor; Oliver Welch; Alana Sherman; Harrison Molloy	New Zealand

The mixed eight competition at the 2025 World Rowing Championships took place at Dianshan Lake, in Shanghai.

== Schedule ==
The schedule was as follows:

Date	Time	Round
Sunday 28 September 2025	10:19	Heats
Sunday 28 September 2025	13:45	Final B
Sunday 28 September 2025	14:57	Final A

All times are UTC+08:00

== Results ==
=== Heats ===
The two fastest boats in each heat and the two fastest times advanced directly to Final A. The remaining boats were sent to Final B.

==== Heat 1 ====
Rank	Rower	Country	Time	Notes
1	Maria-Magdalena Rusu (F); Maria Lehaci (F); Andrada-Maria Moroșanu (F); Florin Lehaci; Florin Arteni; Ciprian Tudosă; Ștefan Berariu; Simona Radiș (F); Victoria-Ștefania Petreanu (F) (c)	Romania	5:50.02	FA, WB
2	Laura Meriano (F); Elisa Mondelli (F); Aisha Rocek (F); Alice Codato (F); Giacomo Gentili; Andrea Panizza; Nunzio di Colandrea; Giovanni Codato; Alessandra Faella (F) (c)	Italy	5:56.73	FA
3	Nina Wettstein (F); Salome Ulrich (F); Lisa Lötscher (F); Patrick Brunner; Jonah Plock; Kai Schaetzle; Maurin Lange; Fabienne Schweizer (F); Olivia Nacht (F) (c)	Switzerland	6:03.54	FB
4	Michala Pospíšilová (F); Pavlína Flamíková (F); Jan Čížek; Dalibor Neděla; Jakub Podrazil; Martin Ježek; Anna Šantrůčková (F); Alžběta Zavadilová (F); Monika Perglerová (F) (c)	Czech Republic	6:06.07	FB
5	Winne Hung (F); Leung King Wan (F); Leung Wing Wun (F); Claire Susan Burley (F); Chan Tik Lun; Chen Pak Hong; Lam San Tung; To Siu Po; Wong Sheung Yee (F) (c)	Hong Kong	6:43.98	FB

==== Heat 2 ====
Rank	Rower	Country	Time	Notes
1	Kate Knifton (F); Camille Vandermeer (F); Teal Cohen (F); Azja Czajkowski (F); Billy Bender; Jacob Hudgins; Nathan Phelps; Christopher Carlson; Nina Castagna (F) (c)	United States	5:55.74	FA
2	Anna Härtl (F); Tabea Schendekehl (F); Luise Bachmann (F); Julius Christ; Paul Klapperich; Theis Hagemeister; Soenke Kruse; Frauke Hundeling (F); Jonas Wiesen (M) (c)	Germany	5:57.37	FA
3	Nika Johanna Vos (F); Hermijntje Drenth (F); Tinka Offereins (F); Ymkje Clevering (F); Lennart van Lierop; Guillaume Krommenhoek; Gert-Jan van Doorn; Mick Makker; Jonna de Vries (F) (c)	Netherlands	5:58.73	FA
4	Isla Blake (F); Juliette Lequeux (F); Rebecca Leigh (F); Flynn Eliadis-Watson; Campbell Crouch; Benjamin Taylor; Oliver Welch; Alana Sherman (F); Harrison Molloy (M) (c)	New Zealand	6:02.30	FA
5	Lin Xinyu (F); Zhang Ling (F); Wang Zifeng (F); Ju Rui (F); Liu Dang; Cong Sheng; Wangjia Wangjia; Zhang Maolin; Song Jiayi (F) (c)	China	5	FB

=== Finals ===
The A final determined the rankings for places 1 to 6. Additional rankings were determined in the other finals.

==== Final B ====
Rank	Rower	Country	Time	Total rank
1	Nina Wettstein (F); Salome Ulrich (F); Lisa Lötscher (F); Maurin Lange; Jonah Plock; Patrick Brunner; Kai Schaetzle; Fabienne Schweizer (F); Olivia Nacht (F) (c)	Switzerland	6:00.60	7
2	Michala Pospíšilová (F); Pavlína Flamíková (F); Anna Šantrůčková (F); Dalibor Neděla; Jan Čížek; Martin Ježek; Jakub Podrazil; Alžběta Zavadilová (F); Monika Perglerová (F) (c)	Czech Republic	6:04.42	8
3	Lin Xinyu (F); Zhang Ling (F); Wang Zifeng (F); Ju Rui (F); Liu Dang; Cong Sheng; Wangjia Wangjia; Zhang Maolin; Song Jiayi (F) (c)	China	6:21.53	9
4	Chan Tik Lun; Leung King Wan (F); Leung Wing Wun (F); Claire Susan Burley (F); Winne Hung (F); Chen Pak Hong; Lam San Tung; To Siu Po; Wong Sheung Yee (F) (c)	Hong Kong	6:38.30	10

==== Final A ====
Rank	Rower	Country	Time	Notes
1st place, gold medalist(s)	Maria-Magdalena Rusu (F); Maria Lehaci (F); Andrada-Maria Moroșanu (F); Florin Lehaci; Florin Arteni; Ciprian Tudosă; Ștefan Berariu; Simona Radiș (F); Victoria-Ștefania Petreanu (F) (c)	Romania	5:34.46	WB
2nd place, silver medalist(s)	Laura Meriano (F); Elisa Mondelli (F); Aisha Rocek (F); Alice Codato (F); Giacomo Gentili; Andrea Panizza; Nunzio di Colandrea; Giovanni Codato; Alessandra Faella (F) (c)	Italy	5:39.58	
3rd place, bronze medalist(s)	Isla Blake (F); Juliette Lequeux (F); Rebecca Leigh (F); Flynn Eliadis-Watson; Campbell Crouch; Benjamin Taylor; Oliver Welch; Alana Sherman (F); Harrison Molloy (M) (c)	New Zealand	5:41.06	
4	Kate Knifton (F); Teal Cohen (F); Azja Czajkowski (F); Camille Vandermeer (F); Nathan Phelps; Billy Bender; Christopher Carlson; Jacob Hudgins; Nina Castagna (F) (c)	United States	5:42.69	
5	Nika Johanna Vos (F); Ymkje Clevering (F); Tinka Offereins (F); Hermijntje Drenth (F); Lennart van Lierop; Guillaume Krommenhoek; Gert-Jan van Doorn; Mick Makker; Jonna de Vries (F) (c)	Netherlands	5:42.85	
6	Anna Härtl (F); Tabea Schendekehl (F); Luise Bachmann (F); Julius Christ; Paul Klapperich; Theis Hagemeister; Soenke Kruse; Frauke Hundeling (F); Jonas Wiesen (M) (c)	Germany	5:45.99	
