= Annie Campbell-Orde =

British rower (born 1995)

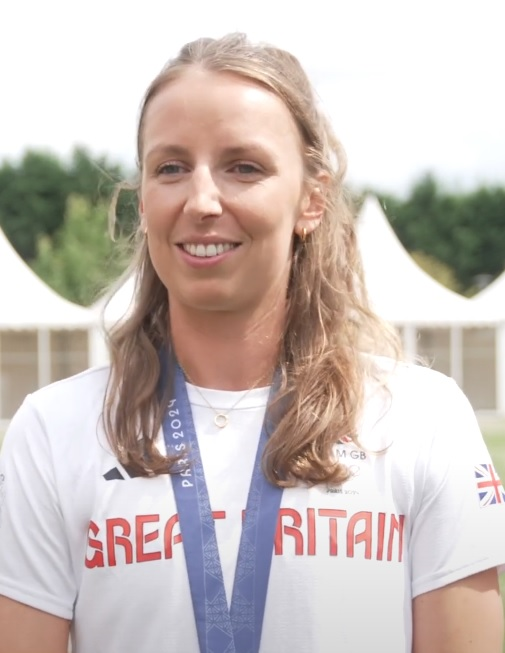
- Campbell-Orde at the 2024 Paris Olympics

Personal information
- Full name: Annie Grace Campbell-Orde
- Born: 5 October 1995 (age 31) Wells, Somerset, England

Sport
- Sport: Rowing
- Club: Leander Club
Medal record
Women's rowing
Representing Great Britain
Olympic Games
Bronze medal – third place	2024 Paris	Eight
World Championships
Silver medal – second place	2026 Amsterdam	Eight
European Championships
Silver medal – second place	2023 Bled	Eight
Silver medal – second place	2024 Szeged	Eight
Silver medal – second place	2026 Varese	Eight

Annie Grace Campbell-Orde (born 5 October 1995) is a British rower.

== Early life and education ==
Campbell-Orde learned to row at Nottingham Rowing Club. She attended Wells Cathedral School and Millfield School, followed by Loughborough University.

== Career ==
Campbell-Orde was selected as a spare for the 2022 European Rowing Championships in Munich. She was part of the British crew that won the silver medal in the women's eight at the 2023 European Rowing Championships in Bled.

She won a bronze medal as part of the Great Britain eight at the 2024 Summer Olympics.
