= Lizzie Witt =

British rower (born 2000)

Personal information
- Full name: Elizabeth Witt
- Born: 3 December 2000 (age 25)

Sport
- Sport: Rowing
Medal record
Women's rowing
Representing Great Britain
World Championships
Silver medal – second place	2026 Amsterdam	Eight
European Championships
Silver medal – second place	2026 Varese	Eight

Elizabeth Witt (born 3 December 2000) is a British rower. She was a silver medalist at the 2026 World Rowing Championships and 2026 European Rowing Championships.

== Biography ==
From Richmond, London, Witt started rowing at school and continued through university where she studied physics at Imperial College.

Witt placed sixth in the women's pair alongside Jade Lindo at the World Rowing Championships in Shanghai in September 2025.

In August 2026, she was a silver medalist in the women's eight at the 2026 European Rowing Championships. She also won a silver medal at the 2025 World Rowing Championships in Amsterdam, in August 2026 as part of the Women's eight.
