= Lauren Irwin =

British rower (born 1998)

Personal information
- Born: 20 August 1998 (age 28) Sunderland
- Home town: Peterlee
- Height: 186 cm (6 ft 1 in)

Sport
- Sport: Rowing
- Club: Leander Club
Medal record
Women's rowing
Representing Great Britain
Olympic Games
Bronze medal – third place	2024 Paris	Eight
World Championships
Silver medal – second place	2026 Amsterdam	Eight
Bronze medal – third place	2025 Shanghai	Eight
European Championships
Gold medal – first place	2025 Plovdiv	Eight
Silver medal – second place	2022 Oberschleißheim	Eight
Silver medal – second place	2023 Bled	Eight
Silver medal – second place	2024 Szeged	Eight
Silver medal – second place	2026 Varese	Eight
Bronze medal – third place	2025 Plovdiv	Coxless four

Lauren Irwin (born 20 August 1998) is a British rower.

== Early life and education ==
Irwin is from Peterlee in County Durham and attended St Bede's Catholic School and Durham Sixth Form Centre. From 2016 to 2019, she studied sport health and exercise at Durham University. She was a member of College of St Hild and St Bede, Durham, but never competed for their boat club.

== Career ==
Irwin made her senior debut at the 2021 World Cup regatta in Sabaudia. At the 2022 European Rowing Championships in Munich, Irwin was part of the British crew that took the silver medal in the Women's eight. She replicated this achievement a year later at the 2023 European Rowing Championships held on Lake Bled.

She won a bronze medal as part of the Great Britain eight at the 2024 Summer Olympics.
