= 2021 World Rowing U23 Championships =

Rowing event

- Location: Račice, Czech Republic
- Dates: 7–11 July

The 2021 World Rowing U23 Championships was the 17th edition of the World Rowing U23 Championships and was held from 7 July to 11 July 2021 in Račice, Czech Republic.

== Men's events ==
| Event | Gold | | Silver | | Bronze | |
Openweight events
| M1x | Emil Neykov; Bulgaria | 6:56.72 | Piotr Plominski; Poland | 6:58.47 | Bastian Secher; Denmark | 7:00.80 |
| M2x | Greece (b) Christos Stergiakas (s) Athanasios Palaiopanos | 6:23.49 | Germany (b) Aaron Erfanian (s) Moritz Wolff | 6:25.62 | Switzerland (b) Kai Schätzle (s) Tim Roth | 6:29.12 |
| M4x | Czech Republic (b) Daniel Nosek (2) Tomas Sisma (3) Dalibor Nedela (s) Filip Zima | 5:47.49 | Italy (b) Nicolò Carucci (2) Leonardo Tedoldi (3) Matteo Sartori (s) Pietro Cangialosi | 5:48.55 | Netherlands (b) Guus Mollee (2) Olav Molenaar (3) Noud Scholten (s) Gert-Jan van Doorn | 5:49.06 |
| M2- | Great Britain (b) Calvin Tarczy (s) Douwe de Graaf | 6:30.73 | Lithuania (b) Dovydas Stankūnas (s) Domantas Stankūnas | 6:33.46 | Turkey (b) Kaan Aydın (s) Aydın Sahin | 6:37.56 |
| M4- | Canada (b) Liam Keane (2) Adam Krol (3) Peter Lancashire (s) John Walkey | 5:56.68 | Ireland (b) Jack Dorney (2) Alex Byrne (3) Ross Corrigan (s) John Kearney | 5:58.66 | Great Britain (b) Callum Sullivan (2) Matthew Rowe (3) Henry Blois-Brooke (s) Iwan Hadfield | 6:02.01 |
| M4+ | Italy (b) Andrea Carando (2) Davide Verità (3) Aniello Sabbatino (s) Nunzio Di Colandrea (c) Filippo Wiesenfeld | 6:06.40 | Ireland (b) Reilly Fionn (2) Adam Murphy (3) Ryan Spelman (s) Andrew Sheehan (c) Leah Regan | 6:12.84 | United States (b) Liam Galloway (2) William Geib (3) Christian Tabash (s) Erik Spinka (c) James Catalano | 6:14.69 |
| M8+ | Great Britain (b) Noah Norman (2) Miles Beeson (3) Simon Nunayon (4) Tobias Schröder (5) Felix Drinkall (6) Callum Sullivan (7) Joshua Bowesman-Jones (s) Michael Dalton (c) Scott Cockle | 5:34.34 | United States (b) William Bender (2) Nicholas Rusher (3) Jacob Hudgins (4) Kenneth Coplan (5) Peter Chatain (6) Griffin Dunne (7) Rhett Burns (s) Augustine Rodriguez (c) Sydney Edwards | 5:34.55 | Germany (b) Mark Hinrichs (2) Henry Hopmann (3) Benedict Eggeling (4) Floyd Benedikter (5) Tassilo von Müller (6) Mattes Schönherr (7) Julian Garth (s) Jasper Angl (c) Till Martini | 5:35.58 |
Lightweight events
| LM1x | Antonios Papakonstantinou; Greece | 6:57.63 | Niels Torre; Italy | 6:59.96 | Lazar Penev; Bulgaria | 7:10.74 |
| LM2x | Germany (b) Fabio Kress (s) Melvin Mueller-Ruchholtz | 6:21.29 | France (b) Ferdinand Ludwig (s) Victor Marcelot | 6:22.28 | Belgium (b) Marlon Colpaert (s) Tibo Vyvey | 6:24.85 |
| LM4x | Germany (b) Finn Wolter (2) Paul Leerkamp (3) Aaron Wenk (s) Julian Bothe | 5:56.23 | France (b) Pierrick Verger (2) Cornelus Palsma (3) Baptiste Savaete (s) Corentin Amet | 5:57.68 | Italy (b) Matteo Tonelli (2) Giulio Acernese (3) Alessandro Benzoni (s) Giovanni Borgonovo | 5:59.12 |
| LM2- | Chile (b) Manuel Fernández (s) Roberto Liewald | 6:47.58 | Italy (b) Simone Fasoli (s) Simone Mantegazza | 6:49.98 | Uzbekistan (b) Shakhzod Nurmatov (s) Evgeniy Agafonov | 6:52.46 |

== Women's events ==
| Event | Gold | | Silver | | Bronze | |
Openweight events
| W1x | Alexandra Föster; Germany | 7:35.24 | Aurelia-Maxima Janzen; Switzerland | 7:39.47 | Katherine Williams; South Africa | 7:42.98 |
| W2x | Netherlands (b) Lisa Bruijnincx (s) Fien van Westreenen | 7:15.61 | Germany (b) Cora Loch (s) Judith Guhse | 7:16.38 | Greece (b) Angeliki Arabatzi (s) Evangelia Fragkou | 7:16.51 |
| W4x | Switzerland (b) Salome Ulrich (2) Nina Wettstein (3) Lisa Lötscher (s) Celia Dupre | 6:30.87 | Germany (b) Marie-Sophie Zeidler (2) Luise Bachmann (3) Tabea Kuhnert (s) Sarah Wibberenz | 6:34.48 | Italy (b) Sara Borghi (2) Lucrezia Baudino (3) Gaia Colasante (s) Vittoria Tonoli | 6:35.65 |
| W2- | Croatia (b) Ivana Jurković (s) Josipa Jurković | 7:17.20 | United States (b) Caitlin Esse (s) Lucy Koven | 7:19.79 | Germany (b) Lena Sarassa (s) Hannah Reif | 7:22.39 |
| W4- | Great Britain (b) Amelia Standing (2) Holly Dunford (3) Lettice Cabot (s) Daisy Bellamy | 6:35.66 | United States (b) Kelsey Mcginley (2) Teal Cohen (3) Alexandria Vallancey-Martinson (s) Francesca Raggi | 6:37.52 | Romania (b) Alice-Elena Turcanu (2) Alina-Maria Baletchi (3) Andreea Popa (s) Dumitrita Juncanariu | 6:40.76 |
| W4+ | Romania (b) Adriana Surupaceanu (2) Ioana-Madalina Morosan (3) Lorena Constantin (s) Iuliana Timoc (c) Victoria-Stefania Petreanu | 7:12.79 | Germany (b) Tori Schwerin (2) Maike Böttcher (3) Magdalena Rabl (s) Anna Haendle (c) Annalena Fisch | 7:14.63 | Italy (b) Veronica Bumbaca (2) Khadija Alajdi El Idrissi (3) Laura Meriano (s) Clara Massaria (c) Camilla Infante | 7:15.39 |
| W8+ | United States (b) Mckenna Bryant (2) Sophia Hahn (3) Anna Jensen (4) Sierra Bishop (5) Kelsey Mcginley (6) Teal Cohen (7) Alexandria Vallancey-Martinson (s) Francesca Raggi (c) Isabel Aronin | 6:16.69 | Netherlands (b) Vienna van Niersen (2) Susanna Temming (3) Willemijn Mulder (4) Vera Sneijders (5) Jessy Vermeer (6) Iris Klok (7) Isabel van Opzeeland (s) Femke Paulis (c) Lotte Wolfenter | 6:20.43 | Germany (b) Katharina Bauer (2) Paula Hartmann (3) Alissa Buhrmann (4) Anna Kracklauer (5) Stina Roebbecke (6) Lisa Holbrook (7) Annika Weber (s) Katja Fuhrmann (c) Neele Erdtmann | 6:26.45 |
Lightweight events
| LW1x | Silvia Crosio; Italy | 7:49.92 | Evangelia Anastasiadou; Greece | 7:55.42 | Aleksandra Fomina; Russia | 7:56.51 |
| LW2x | Turkey (b) Merve Uslu (s) Elis Ozbay | 7:14.44 | Italy (b) Bianca Saffirio (s) Greta Parravicini | 7:16.98 | Poland (b) Zuzanna Jasinska (s) Wiktoria Kalinowska | 7:18.19 |
| LW4x | Italy (b) Greta Martinelli (2) Ilaria Corazza (3) Elena Sali (s) Arianna Passini | 6:44.31 | Germany (b) Eva Hohoff (2) Romy Dreher (3) Natalie Weber (s) Antonia Würich | 6:53.76 | | |
| LW2- | Italy (b) Maria Zerboni (s) Samantha Premerl | 7:31.65 | Germany (b) Antonia Michaels (s) Cecilia Sommerfeld | 7:38.01 | United States (b) Bonnie Pushner (s) Lindsey Rust | 7:41.94 |

== Medal table ==
* Host nation (Czech Republic)

| Rank | Nation | Gold | Silver | Bronze | Total |
|---|---|---|---|---|---|
| 1 | Italy (ITA) | 4 | 4 | 3 | 11 |
| 2 | Germany (GER) | 3 | 6 | 3 | 12 |
| 3 | Great Britain (GBR) | 3 | 0 | 1 | 4 |
| 4 | Greece (GRE) | 2 | 1 | 1 | 4 |
| 5 | United States (USA) | 1 | 3 | 2 | 6 |
| 6 | Netherlands (NED) | 1 | 1 | 1 | 3 |
| 6 | Switzerland (SUI) | 1 | 1 | 1 | 3 |
| 8 | Bulgaria (BUL) | 1 | 0 | 1 | 2 |
| 8 | Romania (ROU) | 1 | 0 | 1 | 2 |
| 8 | Turkey (TUR) | 1 | 0 | 1 | 2 |
| 11 | Canada (CAN) | 1 | 0 | 0 | 1 |
| 11 | Chile (CHI) | 1 | 0 | 0 | 1 |
| 11 | Croatia (CRO) | 1 | 0 | 0 | 1 |
| 11 | Czech Republic (CZE)* | 1 | 0 | 0 | 1 |
| 15 | France (FRA) | 0 | 2 | 0 | 2 |
| 15 | Ireland (IRL) | 0 | 2 | 0 | 2 |
| 17 | Poland (POL) | 0 | 1 | 1 | 2 |
| 18 | Lithuania (LTU) | 0 | 1 | 0 | 1 |
| 19 | Belgium (BEL) | 0 | 0 | 1 | 1 |
| 19 | Denmark (DEN) | 0 | 0 | 1 | 1 |
| 19 | Russia (RUS) | 0 | 0 | 1 | 1 |
| 19 | South Africa (RSA) | 0 | 0 | 1 | 1 |
| 19 | Uzbekistan (UZB) | 0 | 0 | 1 | 1 |
| Totals (23 entries) | | 22 | 22 | 21 | 65 |

== Participants ==
A total of 781 rowers from the national teams of the following 54 countries was registered to compete at 2021 World Rowing U23 Championships.

- Austria (21)
- Azerbaijan (1)
- Belgium (10)
- Brazil (10)
- Bulgaria (2)
- Canada (19)
- Chile (12)
- Ivory Coast (1)
- Croatia (8)
- Cyprus (1)
- Czech Republic (45)
- Denmark (18)
- Egypt (1)
- Spain (19)
- Estonia (10)
- Finland (1)
- France (43)
- Great Britain (24)
- Germany (72)
- Greece (14)
- Hungary (17)
- Ireland (15)
- Israel (1)
- Italy (57)
- Kazakhstan (2)
- Saudi Arabia (1)
- Latvia (1)
- Lithuania (11)
- Morocco (1)
- Moldova (6)
- Mexico (3)
- Netherlands (48)
- Norway (8)
- Panama (1)
- Paraguay (1)
- Peru (3)
- Poland (31)
- Portugal (3)
- Romania (49)
- South Africa (3)
- Russia (20)
- Singapore (2)
- Slovenia (4)
- Serbia (14)
- Switzerland (20)
- Slovakia (7)
- Sweden (2)
- Tunisia (2)
- Turkey (10)
- Ukraine (28)
- United States (68)
- Uruguay (3)
- Uzbekistan (6)
- Zimbabwe (1)

== See also ==
- 2021 World Rowing Championships
- 2021 World Rowing Junior Championships
