= Harriet Taylor (rower) =

British rower (born 1994)

Personal information
- Full name: Harriet Alexandra Emily Taylor
- Nickname: Hattie
- Nationality: British
- Born: 12 February 1994 (age 32) Sunningdale, England
- Height: 182 cm (6 ft 0 in)

Sport
- Country: Great Britain
- Sport: Rowing
- College team: Syracuse Orange (2014–2017)
Medal record
Women's rowing
Representing Great Britain
Olympic Games
Bronze medal – third place	2024 Paris	Eight
European Championships
Silver medal – second place	2019 Lucerne	Eight
Silver medal – second place	2023 Bled	Eight
Silver medal – second place	2024 Szeged	Eight
Bronze medal – third place	2021 Varese	Coxless four

Harriet "Hattie" Alexandra Emily Taylor (born 12 February 1994) is a British rower.

== Early life and education ==
Taylor was born in February 1994 to Andrew and Helen Taylor of Sunningdale, England. She attended the Sir William Perkins's School in Chertsey, Surrey, England. After receiving only a few offers after high school, She headed to Melbourne University Boat club in Australia, where she met with Syracuse coaches and made her way to Syracuse, New York.

She joined Syracuse rowing in 2013 and graduated with a degree in political science in 2017.

== Career ==
Taylor was on the Great Britain's U-23 team, winning a bronze medal at the World Rowing Championships in 2015.

She won a silver medal in the eight at the 2019 European Rowing Championships. In 2021, she won a European bronze medal in the coxless four in Varese, Italy.

Taylor and the Great Britain team finished fourth in the coxless four event in the Tokyo 2020 Olympics.

She was in the women's eight boat which won silver medals at the 2023 European Rowing Championships in Slovenia and the 2024 European Rowing Championships in Hungary.

She won a bronze medal as part of the Great Britain eight at the 2024 Summer Olympics.
