= Emily Ford (rower) =

British rower (born 1994)

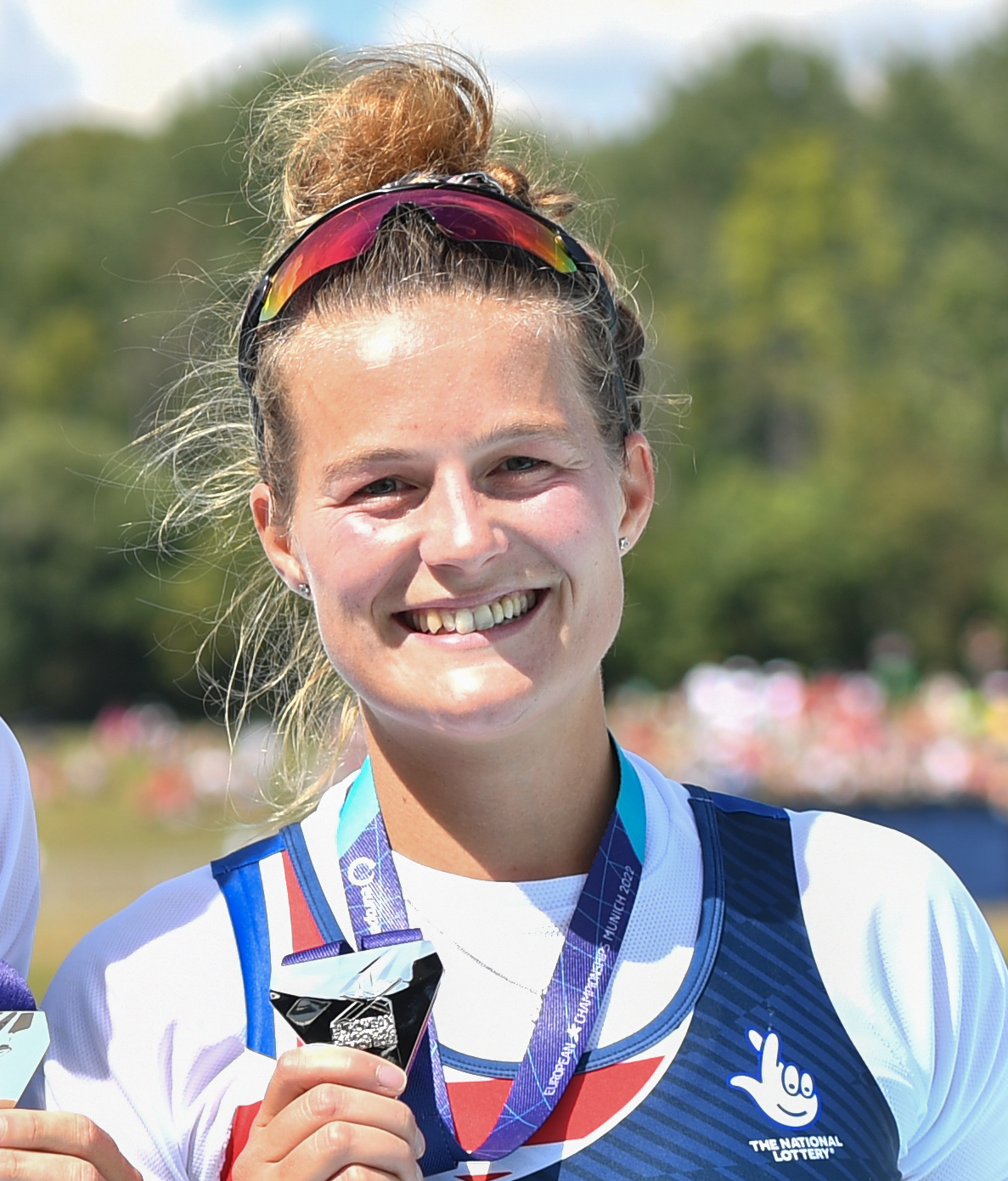
- Ford at the 2022 European Championships

Personal information
- Born: 8 November 1994 (age 32) Holmes Chapel, Cheshire, England
- Height: 181 cm (5 ft 11 in)
- Relative: Thomas (brother)

Sport
- Country: Great Britain
- Sport: Rowing
- Events: Coxless pair, Eight
- Club: Leander Club
Medal record
Women's rowing
Representing Great Britain
Olympic Games
Bronze medal – third place	2024 Paris	Eight
European Championships
Silver medal – second place	2022 Oberschleißheim	Coxless pair
Silver medal – second place	2023 Bled	Eight
Silver medal – second place	2024 Szeged	Eight

Emily Ford (born 8 November 1994) is a British international rower and Olympic medallist.

== Rowing career ==
She won a bronze medal as part of the Great Britain eight at the 2024 Summer Olympics.

== Personal life ==
From Holmes Chapel in Cheshire, her brother Thomas is also a British international rower and fellow Olympic medal winner.

In July 2025, Ford will be awarded an honorary degree from Keele University.
