= Esprit Scholengroep =

Community of schools in Amsterdam, Netherlands

The Esprit Scholengroep is a community of primary and secondary schools in Amsterdam. On their official website they describe themselves as multicultural, international and dynamic.

The level of education and the origin of students varies at each school. Many schools in this community respond to the increasing demand for English education.

== Schools ==
=== Amsterdam International Community School ===
Amsterdam International Community School offers total English education through the International Baccalaureate program making it an official international School. It is both a primary as well as a secondary school.

=== Berlage Lyceum ===
Berlage Lyceum is named after Hendrik Petrus Berlage, an Amsterdam architect. The school offers bilingual education in English and Dutch.

=== Cartesius Lyceum ===
The Cartesius Lyceum is named after French philosopher René Descartes and uses his famous quote "Cogito ergo sum" in their logo.

In 1954, the Spinoza Lyceum (also part of the Esprit scholengroep) had a lack of space. They added two classrooms in the Western part of Amsterdam. These became the "Cartesius Lyceum" in 1956. A larger school building was opened by former Queen Juliana in 1962. After merging with another school in 1988, the number of students decreased. In 1999 the Cartesius Lyceum moved close to Jordaan where no secondary schools were yet situated.

=== Europaschool ===
The European School was founded in 1992 in south Amsterdam. It offers four years of education and has language classes in English, Spanish, French or Dutch.

=== Het 4de Gymnasium ===
Het 4de Gymnasium (“the fourth gymnasium”) is the latest school to join the community. Its first students graduated in 2005. The school offers ‘Fast Lane English’, an intensive course of English. Participants receive a Cambridge Certificate of Proficiency in English.

=== De Nieuwe Internationale School Esprit ===
De nieuwe international school of esprit (DeNISE) offers a bilingual primary and middle year education in English and Dutch. Also like AICS, the school does offer the IB diploma, since 2018. And is a part of the international middle years curriculum.

=== Marcanti College ===
Marcanti College has a 6-year primary and secondary education program that focuses on smaller class sizes to make it easier for students to get better grades. The also offers Business and entrepreneurship classes that most Dutch schools don't offer. The school does not offer bilingual diploma.

=== Montessorischool De Eilanden ===
Montessorischool De Eilanden primary school based on anthropology that was founded in 1992 by a group of parents. It offers primary Dutch language education.

=== Montessorischool Landsmeer ===
Montessorischool Landsmeer is one of the oldest schools that is a part of the esprit scholen and was founded in September 1970 and acquired by esprit in January 2013. The school offers primary and secondary education in Dutch.

=== Mundus College ===
Mundus College is a primary and secondary school that offers education in Dutch and focuses on students with international backgrounds

=== WSV ===
WSV is a primary school that claims to be "free from political, religious or ideological bond and is open to students of all faiths and nationalities." The school offers English classes but is primarily in Dutch.
