= Holly Dunford =

British rower

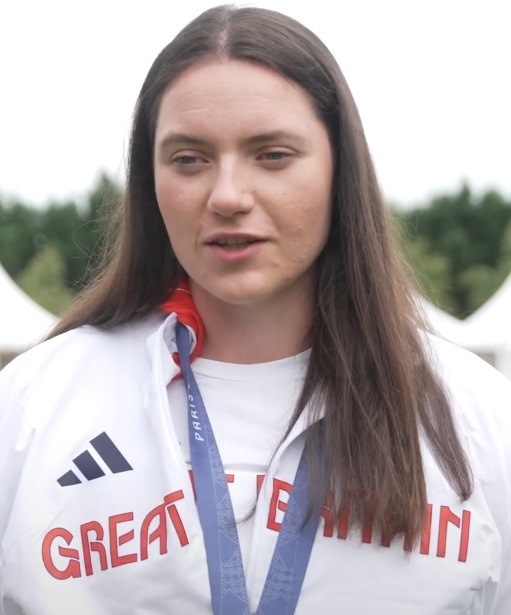
- Dunford at the 2024 Summer Olympics

Personal information
- Born: 14 October 1999 (age 27)
- Home town: Tadworth, Surrey, England
- Height: 6 ft 0 in (183 cm)

Sport
- Sport: Rowing
- Club: Molesey Boat Club
Medal record
Women's rowing
Representing Great Britain
Olympic Games
Bronze medal – third place	2024 Paris	Eight
European Championships
Silver medal – second place	2024 Szeged	Eight

Holly Dunford (born 14 October 1999) is a British rower. She won a bronze medal at the 2024 Summer Olympics and a silver medal at the 2024 European Rowing Championships in the eight.

== Early life ==
From Tadworth, in Surrey, she became inspired to take up rowing after watching the 2012 London Olympics. She has two siblings, Rachel and William, both her brother and sister are rowers. She attended Heathside School and the University of Washington.

== Career ==
Dunford won gold for Great Britain at the 2017 World Rowing Junior Championships in Lithuania in 2017, alongside Zoe Adamson in the women's double. She also had with three first-place finishes in the single sculls at the GB Rowing Team Junior trials. She also set a new national record for under-18s on the indoor rowing machine. In December 2017 she won the SportsAid one-to-watch award.

Dunford won a silver medal in the Great Britain women's eight at the 2019 World Rowing Under-23 Championships in July 2019. She won gold in the Great Britain women's four at the 2021 World Rowing U23 Championships in Račice, Czechia.

She made her debut in a senior British vest at the World Cup regatta in Italy in April 2024, winning silver in the four and the eight. She was a silver medalist at the 2024 European Rowing Championships in Szeged, Hungary. She won in the 'Sports Person of the Year' category at the Reigate and Banstead Sports Awards 2024.

She won a bronze medal as part of the Great Britain eight at the 2024 Summer Olympics.
