= 2026 European Rowing Championships =

2026 edition of the European Rowing Championships

- Venue: Lake Varese
- Location: Varese, Italy
- Dates: 31 July – 2 August
- Organizing body: World Rowing

The 2026 European Rowing Championships were held from 31 July to 2 August 2026 on Lake Varese, Italy. Organised by World Rowing, it was the 19th consecutive edition of the European Rowing Championships since they were revived in 2007.

== Overview ==
Organised for the first time in 1893, the first edition of the European Rowing Championships was held on Lake Orta, Italy. The championships were held annually until the 1973 edition, after which they were discontinued. They were reintroduced in 2007 and have been held annually since. The 2026 edition, organised by World Rowing, was held from 31 July to 2 August on Lake Varese, Italy. There were openweight and lightweight events both for men and women, as well as mixed and pararowing events.

== Medal summary ==
=== Medal table ===
* Host nation (Italy)

Rank	Nation	Gold	Silver	Bronze	Total
1	Romania	6	1	1	8
2	Germany	5	6	1	12
3	Great Britain	5	1	0	6
4	Italy*	2	2	5	9
–	(Authorised Neutral Athletes) Individual Neutral Athletes	2	1	2	5
5	Greece	1	2	2	5
6	Ukraine	1	2	1	4
7	Serbia	1	0	1	2
7	Switzerland	1	0	1	2
9	Lithuania	0	2	1	3
10	Netherlands	0	2	0	2
11	Azerbaijan	0	1	0	1
11	Czech Republic	0	1	0	1
11	Georgia	0	1	0	1
11	Poland	0	1	0	1
11	Spain	0	1	0	1
16	Croatia	0	0	2	2
16	Israel	0	0	2	2
18	Denmark	0	0	1	1
18	France	0	0	1	1
Totals (19 entries)		24	24	21	69

Romania topped the medal table after winning four gold medals on the final day, including victories in all three eights events. The final day's racing was affected by severe weather, which forced a temporary evacuation of Lake Varese and changes to the racing schedule.

=== Men ===
Event	Gold		Silver		Bronze	
Openweight events
M1x	Germany; Oliver Zeidler	6:36.39	Authorised Neutral Athletes; Yauheni Zalaty	6:39.94	Greece; Stefanos Ntouskos	6:40.97
M2x	Serbia; Martin Mačković; Nikolaj Pimenov	6:04.45	Spain; Caetano Horta; Rodrigo Conde	6:06.22	Croatia; Martin Sinković; Valent Sinković	6:08.35
M4x	Germany; Marc Weber; Felix Heinrich; Jonas Gelsen; Ole Hohensee	5:37.21	Poland; Dominik Czaja; Mateusz Biskup; Mirosław Ziętarski; Konrad Domański	5:38.24	Croatia; Goran Mahmutović; Roko Bošković; Damir Martin; Ivan Talaja	5:40.40
M2−	Romania; Ștefan Berariu; Florin Lehaci	6:15.62	Lithuania; Dovydas Stankūnas; Domantas Stankūnas	6:18.29	Italy; Matteo Lodo; Giovanni Codato	6:18.78
M4−	Great Britain; Theodore Bell; Sam Ford; Joshua Brangan; Thomas O'Sullivan	5:43.38; ECHB	Romania; Cosmin Iulian Plesescu; Leontin Nutescu; Andrei Vatamaniuc; Ciprian Tudosă	5:44.13	Germany; Jasper Angl; Mark Hinrichs; Benedict Eggeling; René Schmela	5:46.22
M8+	Romania; Claudiu Neamtu; Mateus-Simion Cozminciuc; Mugurel Semciuc; Andrei Mândrilă; Constantin Adam; Sergiu Bejan; Florin Arteni; Fabrizio-Alexandru Scripcariu; Rucsandra-Ioana Bucsa	5:25.95	Germany; Sönke Kruse; Theis Hagemeister; Olaf Roggensack; Mattes Schönherr; Tassilo Von Mueller; Julius Christ; Paul Klapperich; Frederik Breuer; Jonas Wiesen	5:28.85	Italy; Luca Chiumento; Salvatore Monfrecola; Giovanni Abagnale; Matteo Sartori eonardo Pietra Caprina; Andrea Panizza; Nunzio Di Colandrea; Giuseppe Vicino; Alessandra Faella	5:31.74
Lightweight events
LM1x	Greece; Petros Gkaidatzis	6:50.92	Germany; Fabio Kress	6:54.63	Ukraine; Ihor Khmara	6:56.80
LM2x	Italy; Tito Christoforakis; Giovanni Borgonovo	6:21.78	Azerbaijan; Ziya Mammadzada; Nurlan Pashayev	6:28.55	not awarded	
LM2-	Germany; Patrick Erdmann; Johannes Ursprung	6:49.72	Georgia; Giorgi Kanteladze; Davit Lashkareishvili	6:53.32	not awarded	
Pararowing events
PR1 M1x	Benjamin Pritchard; Great Britain	9:07.88	Giacomo Perini; Italy	9:15.44	Shmuel Daniel; Israel	9:35.55

=== Women ===
Event	Gold		Silver		Bronze	
Openweight events
W1x	Great Britain; Lauren Henry	7:15.11	Lithuania; Viktorija Senkutė	7:19.22	Serbia; Jovana Arsić	7:21.58
W2x	Authorised Neutral Athletes; Tatsiana Klimovich; Alena Furman	6:44.78	Greece; Dimitra Kontou; Evangelia Anastasiadou	6:46.10	Lithuania; Martyna Kazlauskaitė; Dovilė Rimkutė	6:46.66
W4x	Switzerland; Nina Wettstein; Flavia Lötscher; Célia Dupré; Lisa Lötscher	6:12.17	Germany; Maren Völz; Juliane Faralisch; Johanna Debus; Frauke Hundeling	6:12.85	Romania; Mariana-Laura Dumitru; Emanuela Ioana Ciotau; Andrada-Maria Moroșanu; Iulia-Liliana Balauca	6:14.40
W2−	Romania; Adriana Adam; Simona Radiș	6:49.04	Czech Republic; Anna Šantrůčková; Pavlína Flamíková	6:56.11	Italy; Laura Meriano; Alice Codato	6:57.29
W4−	Great Britain; Sarah Marshall; Eleanor Brinkhoff; Angharad Broughton; Holly Youd	6:23.03	Germany; Hannah Reif; Paula Hartmann; Annabelle Bachmann; Pia Greiten	6:24.65	Authorised Neutral Athletes; Ekaterina Zhevlachenko; Ekaterina Glazkova; Marina Rubtsova; Valentina Plaksina	6:25.26
W8+	Romania; Cristina Drugă; Dumitrița Juncănariu; Ancuța Bodnar; Maria Tivodariu; Maria-Magdalena Rusu; Amalia Bereș; Adriana Adam; Simona Radiș; Victoria-Ștefania Petreanu	5:56.14	Great Britain; Elizabeth Witt; Megan Slabbert; Amelia Standing; Katherine George; Lauren Irwin; Eve Stewart; Heidi Long; Annie Campbell-Orde; Jack Tottem	6:01.57	Italy; Clara Guerra; Giorgia Pelacchi; Angelica Merlini; Sophie Souwer; Silvia Terrazzi; Elisa Mondelli; Laura Meriano; Alice Codato; Emanuele Capponi	6:03.65
Lightweight events
LW1x	Authorised Neutral Athletes; Mariya Zhovner	7:30.47	Netherlands; Tosca Kettler	7:36.58	Greece; Gavriela Lioliou	7:39.14
LW2x	Italy; Elena Sali; Melissa Schincariol	6:55.95	Greece; Paschalina Mouratidou; Gavriela Lioliou	7:03.09	not awarded	
Pararowing events
PR1 W1x	Anna Sheremet; Ukraine	10:02.25	Eva Mol; Netherlands	10:40.80	Claire Ghiringhelli; Switzerland	10:43.41

=== Mixed events ===
Event	Gold		Silver		Bronze	
Mix2x	Romania; Marian Enache; Iulia-Liliana Bălăucă	6:27.87	Germany; Juliane Faralisch; Arno Gaus	6:28.86	Italy; Niels Torre; Sophie Souwer	6:30.41
Mix8+	Romania; Maria-Magdalena Rusu; Maria Tivodariu; Ancuța Bodnar; Amalia Bereș; Andrei Vatamaniuc; Leontin Nutescu; Ștefan Berariu; Florin Lehaci; Victoria-Ștefania Petreanu	5:41.90	Germany; Sarah Wibberenz; Lisa Gutfleisch; Hannah Reif; Frauke Hundeling; Benedict Eggeling; Tobias Strangemann; Leonard Brahms; René Schmela; Till Martini	5:46.93	Denmark; Clara Hornnaess; Karen Mortensen; Amalie Louise Thorsen; Aksel Poulsen; Magnus Valbirk; Nikolaj Kragh Simonsen; Christian Soendergaard; Frida Werner Foldager; Sophie Oestergaard	5:51.52
Pararowing events
PR2 Mix2x	Germany; Jasmina Bier; Paul Umbach	8:03.84	Ukraine; Anna Aisanova; Iaroslav Koiuda	8:04.24	Israel; Shahar Milfelder; Saleh Shahin	8:13.49
PR3 Mix2x	Germany; Valentin Luz; Kathrin Marchand	6:55.91	Ukraine; Stanislav Samoliuk; Dariia Kotyk	7:06.07	Authorised Neutral Athletes; Anton Voronov; Anna Piskunova	7:22.06
PR3 Mix4+	Great Britain; Francesca Allen; Joshua O'Brien; Charlotte Coburn; Jonty Ridley; Omar Al-Miqdadi (cox)	6:47.80	Italy; Martina Osualdini; Marco Frank; Carolina Foresti; Stanislau Litvinchuk; Chiara Reto (cox)	6:53.75	France; Eva David; Helene Balzac; Grégoire Bireau; Laurent Cadot; Maiwenn Dumont (cox)	6:55.82
