= Jade Lindo =

British rower (born 1999)

Personal information
- Born: 10 December 1999 (age 26)

Sport
- Sport: Rowing
Medal record
Women's rowing
Representing Great Britain
World Championships
Silver medal – second place	2026 Amsterdam	Eight

Jade Lindo (born 10 December 1999) is a British rower. She was a silver medalist at the 2026 World Rowing Championships.

== Biography ==
Lindo grew up in Molesey before moving to Cranleigh, Surrey. Initially participating in athletics as a sprinter, she took up rowing after being identified via the Discover Your Gold talent ID programme and soon joined the GB Start pathway at Twickenham Boat Club. She continued with the sport while studying architecture at the University of Nottingham. In 2022, she represented Great Britain at the World Rowing Beach Sprint Finals.

Lindo placed sixth in the women's pair alongside Lizzie Witt at the 2025 World Rowing Championships in Shanghai in September 2025.

In 2026, she was part of the winning women's eight boat at the World Rowing Cup in Lucerne. In August 2026, she was a silver medalist at the 2026 World Rowing Championships in the Women's eight.
