= Cristina Drugă =

Romanian rower (born 2001)

Personal information
- Nationality: Romanian
- Born: 12 December 2001 (age 24)

Sport
- Country: Romania
- Sport: Rowing
- Event: Eight
Medal record
Women's rowing
Representing Romania
World Championships
Gold medal – first place	2026 Amsterdam	Eight
Gold medal – first place	2026 Amsterdam	Mixed eight
Silver medal – second place	2025 Shanghai	Eight
European Championships
Gold medal – first place	2026 Varese	Eight

Cristina Drugă (born 12 December 2001) is a Romanian rower.

== Career ==
Drugă competed at the 2025 World Rowing Championships and won a silver medal in the eight with a time of 6:10.83.

On 31 July 2026, she competed at the 2026 European Rowing Championships and won a gold medal in the eight with a time of 5:56.14. The next month she competed at the 2026 World Rowing Championships and won a gold medal in the eight with a world best time of 5:51.88. She also won a gold medal in the mixed eight with a time of 5:35.75.
