= Roxana Anghel =

Romanian rower (born 1998)

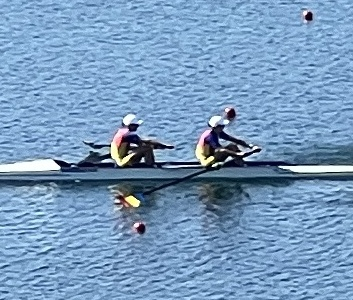

Personal information
- Nationality: Romanian
- Born: 1 January 1998 (age 28) Câmpulung Moldovenesc, Romania
- Height: 1.80 m (5 ft 11 in)

Sport
- Country: Romania
- Sport: Rowing
- Event(s): Eight; Coxless pair
- Club: CS Dinamo București
Medal record
Olympic Games
| Gold medal – first place | 2024 Paris | Eight |
| Silver medal – second place | 2024 Paris | Coxless pair |
World Championships
| Gold medal – first place | 2023 Belgrade | Eight |
| Silver medal – second place | 2025 Shanghai | Eight |
| Bronze medal – third place | 2023 Belgrade | Coxless pair |
European Championships
| Gold medal – first place | 2023 Bled | Coxless pair |
| Gold medal – first place | 2023 Bled | Eight |
| Gold medal – first place | 2024 Szeged | Coxless pair |
| Gold medal – first place | 2024 Szeged | Eight |

Roxana-Iuliana Anghel (born 1 January 1998) is a Romanian rower. She won the gold medal in the women's eight and the silver medal in the women's coxless pair with Ioana Vrînceanu at the 2024 Summer Olympics. Anghel is also a world champion in the women's eight and a four-time European champion, with two titles in eight and coxless pair events. She competed in the women's coxless four at the 2020 Summer Olympics
