= Adriana Adam =

Romanian rower (born 1999)

Personal information
- Nationality: Romanian
- Born: 11 April 1999 (age 27) Văleni, Romania
- Height: 1.85 m (6 ft 1 in)

Sport
- Country: Romania
- Sport: Rowing
- Events: Eight; Coxless pair
Medal record
Women's rowing
Representing Romania
Olympic Games
Gold medal – first place	2024 Paris	Eight
World Championships
Gold medal – first place	2022 Račice	Eight
Gold medal – first place	2023 Belgrade	Eight
Gold medal – first place	2026 Amsterdam	Coxless pair
Gold medal – first place	2026 Amsterdam	Eight
Gold medal – first place	2026 Amsterdam	Mixed eight
Silver medal – second place	2025 Shanghai	Coxless four
Silver medal – second place	2025 Shanghai	Eight
European Championships
Gold medal – first place	2018 Glasgow	Eight
Gold medal – first place	2020 Poznań	Coxless pair
Gold medal – first place	2023 Bled	Eight
Gold medal – first place	2024 Szeged	Eight
Gold medal – first place	2026 Varese	Coxless pair
Gold medal – first place	2026 Varese	Eight
Silver medal – second place	2019 Lucerne	Coxless pair
Silver medal – second place	2021 Varese	Coxless pair
Silver medal – second place	2025 Plovdiv	Coxless four

Adriana Adam (née Ailincăi) (born 11 April 1999) is a Romanian rower. She is an Olympic champion and won the gold medal in the women's eight at the 2024 Summer Olympics. Adam is also a two-time world champion in eight and four-time European champion, including titles in eight and coxless pair. She competed in the 2020 Summer Olympics.
