= Ilse Kolkman =

Dutch rower (born 1997)

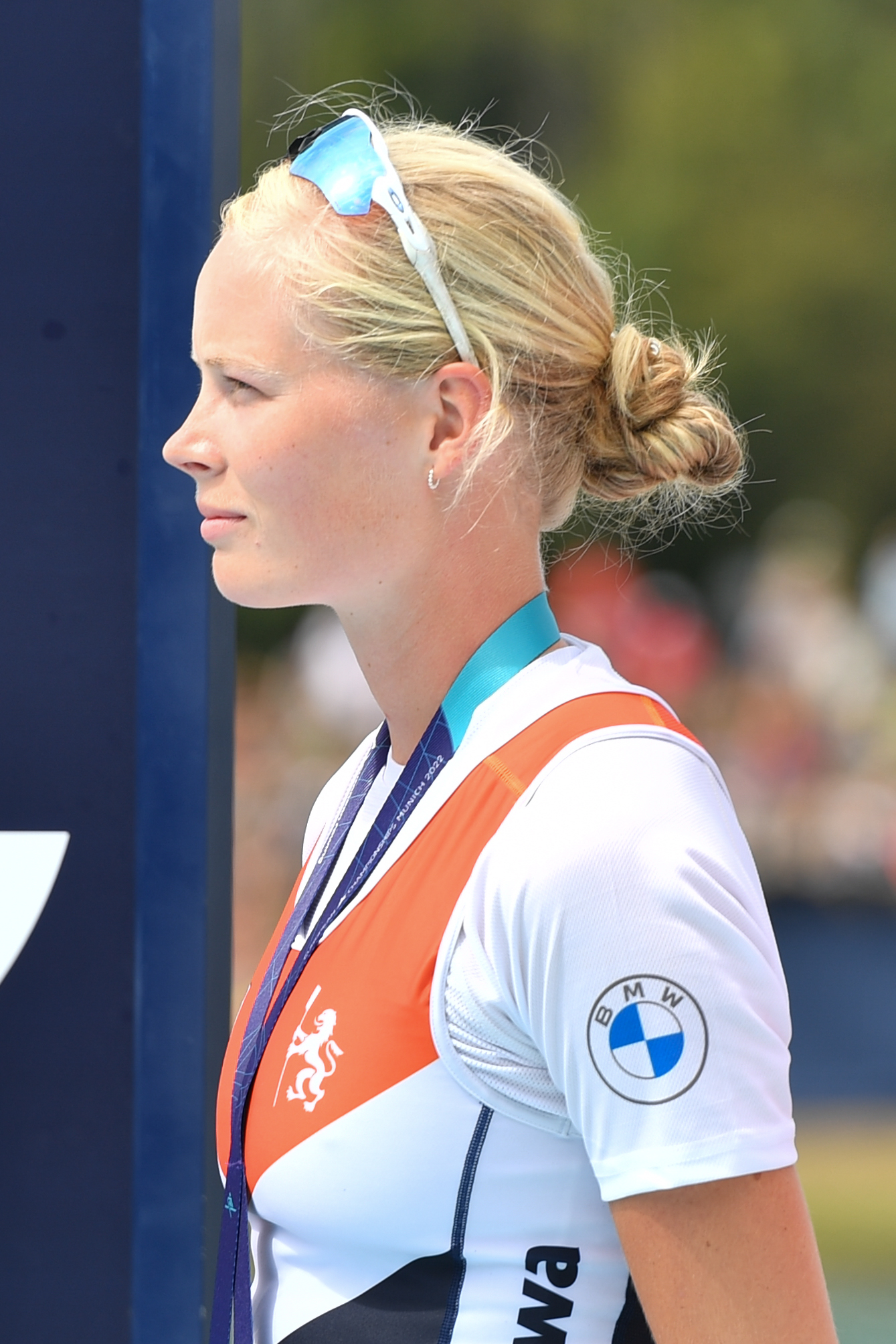
- Kolkman in 2022

Personal information
- Nationality: Dutch
- Born: 6 February 1997 (age 29)

Sport
- Country: Netherlands
- Sport: Rowing
Medal record
Women's rowing
Representing the Netherlands
World Championships
Gold medal – first place	2025 Shanghai	Eight
Silver medal – second place	2022 Račice	Quadruple sculls
European Championships
Silver medal – second place	2022 Oberschleißheim	Quadruple sculls
Silver medal – second place	2023 Bled	Quadruple sculls
Silver medal – second place	2025 Plovdiv	Eight
Bronze medal – third place	2024 Szeged	Quadruple sculls

Ilse Kolkman (born 6 February 1997) is a Dutch rower.

== Career ==
In August 2022, Kolkman competed at the 2022 European Rowing Championships and won a silver medal in the quadruple sculls. The next month she competed at the 2022 World Rowing Championships and won a silver medal in the quadruple sculls with the same crew.

In April 2024, she competed at the 2024 European Rowing Championships and won a bronze medal in the quadruple sculls. She again competed at the 2025 European Rowing Championships and won a silver medal in the eight.

In September 2025, she competed at the 2025 World Rowing Championships and won a gold medal in the eight with a time of 6:08.10. This was the Netherland's first gold in the event at the World Rowing Championships.

== Personal life ==
Kolkman studied psychology at the University of Groningen.
