= Ancuța Bodnar =

Romanian rower (born 1998)

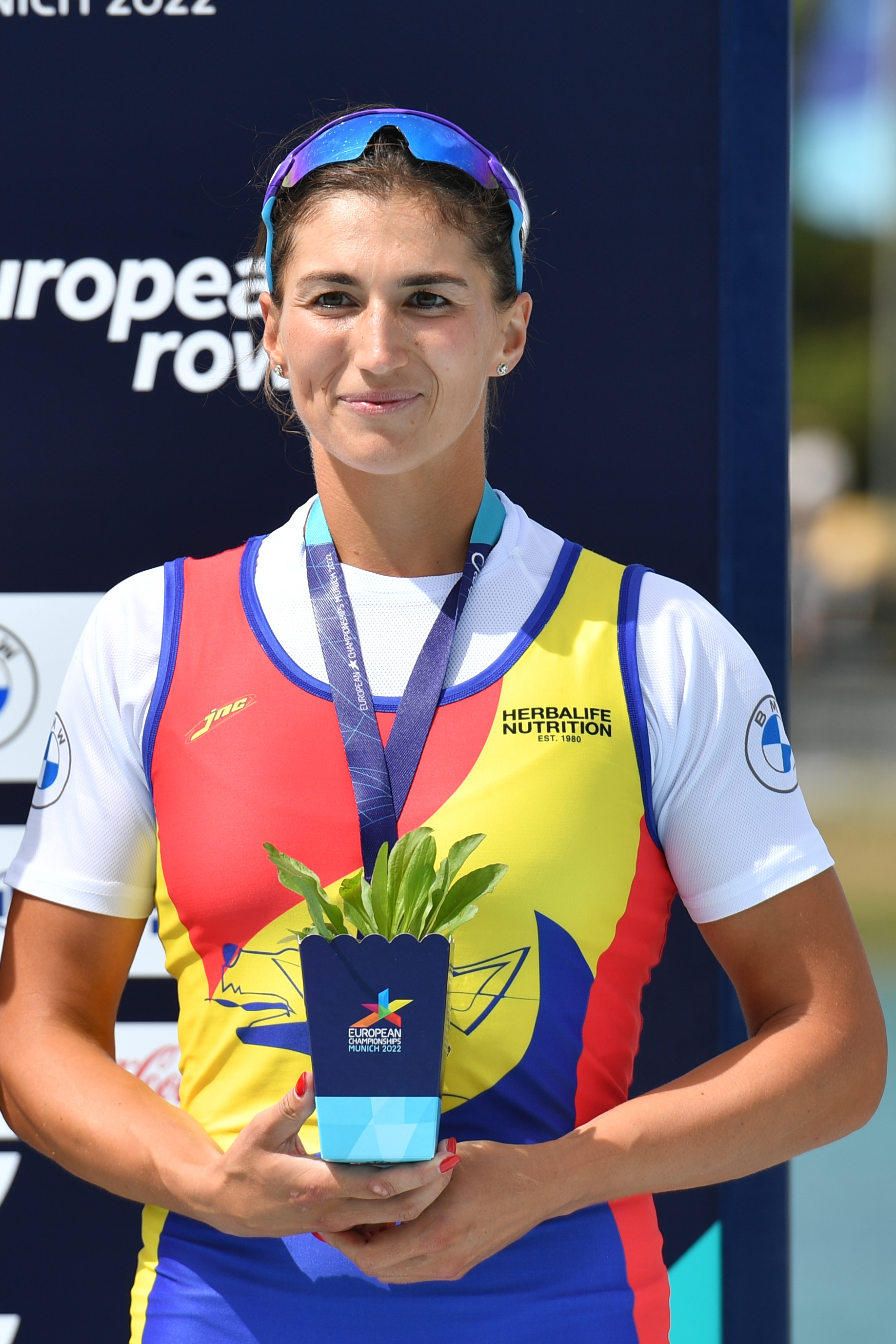
- Bodnar at the 2022 European Championships

Personal information
- Full name: Nicoleta Ancuța Bodnar
- Born: 25 September 1998 (age 27) Vatra Moldoviței, Romania
- Education: University of Craiova
- Height: 179 cm (5 ft 10 in)

Sport
- Country: Romania
- Sport: Rowing
- Event: Double sculls
- Club: CS Dinamo Bucuresti
- Coached by: Antonio Colamonici; Dorin Alupei
Medal record
Women's rowing
Representing Romania
Olympic Games
Gold medal – first place	2020 Tokyo	Double sculls
Gold medal – first place	2024 Paris	Eight
Silver medal – second place	2024 Paris	Double sculls
World Championships
Gold medal – first place	2022 Račice	Double sculls
Gold medal – first place	2023 Belgrade	Double sculls
Gold medal – first place	2026 Amsterdam	Eight
Silver medal – second place	2019 Ottensheim	Double sculls
Silver medal – second place	2025 Shanghai	Coxless four
Silver medal – second place	2025 Shanghai	Eight
European Championships
Gold medal – first place	2020 Poznań	Double sculls
Gold medal – first place	2021 Varese	Double sculls
Gold medal – first place	2022 Oberschleißheim	Double sculls
Gold medal – first place	2022 Oberschleißheim	Eight
Gold medal – first place	2023 Bled	Double sculls
Gold medal – first place	2026 Varese	Eight
Gold medal – first place	2026 Varese	Mixed eight
Silver medal – second place	2019 Lucerne	Double sculls
Silver medal – second place	2025 Plovdiv	Coxless four
Bronze medal – third place	2024 Szeged	Double sculls

Nicoleta Ancuța Bodnar (born 25 September 1998) is a Romanian rower who predominantly competes in double sculls, together with Simona Radiș. She is a two-time Olympic champion and won the gold medal in the women's double sculls at the 2020 Summer Olympics, the gold medal in the women's eight and the silver medal in the women's double sculls at the 2024 Summer Olympics. Bodnar is also a two-time world champion and a four-time European champion in double sculls, and a European champion in eight.
