= Maria-Magdalena Rusu =

Romanian rower (born 1999)

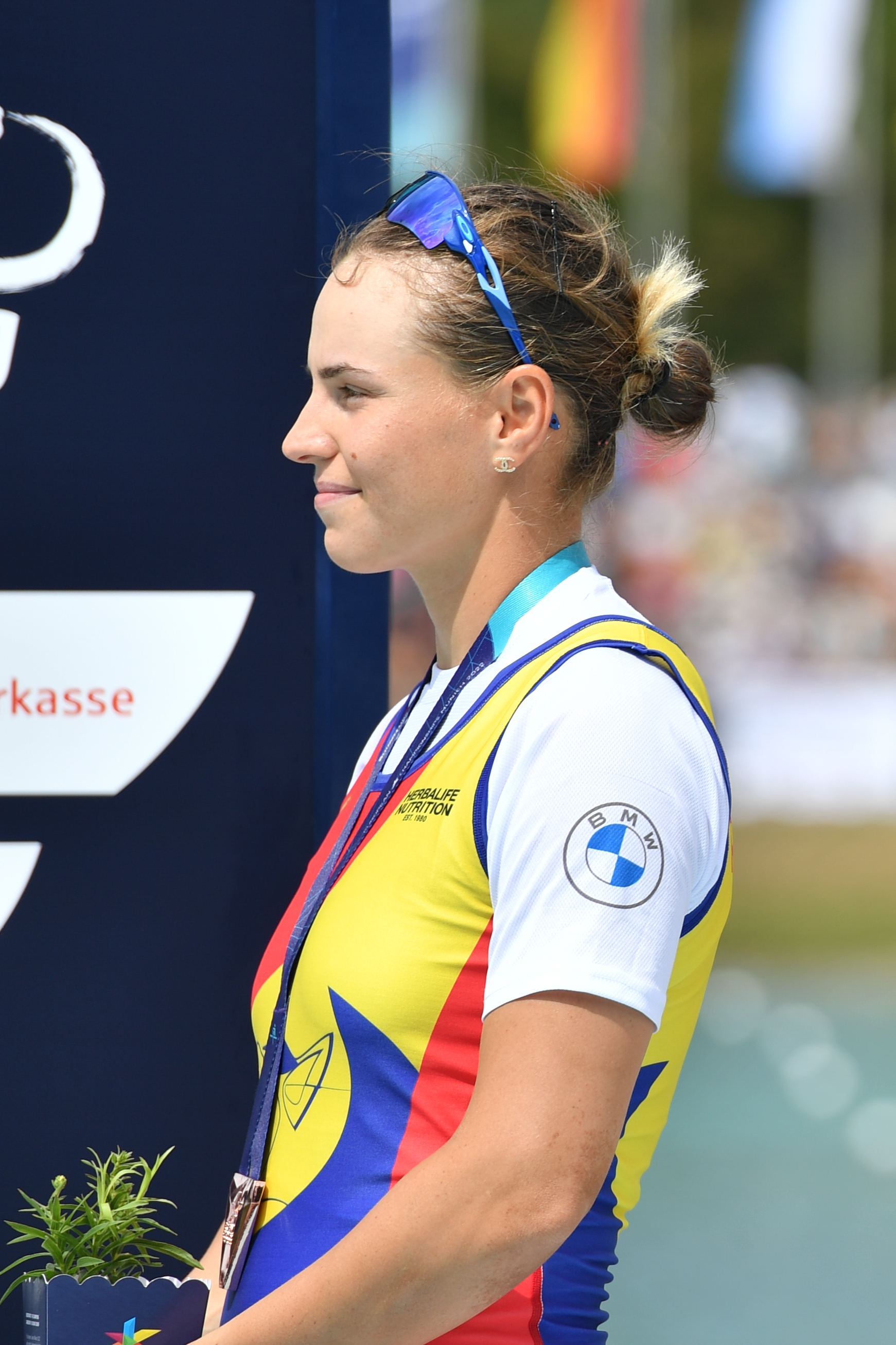
- Rusu in 2022

Personal information
- Nationality: Romanian
- Born: 30 September 1999 (age 26) Vaslui, Romania
- Height: 1.75 m (5 ft 9 in)

Sport
- Country: Romania
- Sport: Rowing
- Events: Eight; Coxless four
Medal record
Women's rowing
Representing Romania
Olympic Games
Gold medal – first place	2024 Paris	Eight
World Championships
Gold medal – first place	2022 Račice	Eight
Gold medal – first place	2023 Belgrade	Eight
Gold medal – first place	2025 Shanghai	Coxless pair
Gold medal – first place	2025 Shanghai	Mixed eight
Gold medal – first place	2026 Amsterdam	Eight
Silver medal – second place	2023 Belgrade	Coxless four
European Championships
Gold medal – first place	2019 Lucerne	Eight
Gold medal – first place	2020 Poznań	Eight
Gold medal – first place	2021 Varese	Eight
Gold medal – first place	2022 Oberschleißheim	Eight
Gold medal – first place	2023 Bled	Coxless four
Gold medal – first place	2023 Bled	Eight
Gold medal – first place	2024 Szeged	Eight
Gold medal – first place	2025 Plovdiv	Coxless pair
Gold medal – first place	2026 Varese	Eight
Gold medal – first place	2026 Varese	Mixed eight
Silver medal – second place	2024 Szeged	Coxless four
Bronze medal – third place	2022 Oberschleißheim	Coxless four

Maria-Magdalena Rusu (born 30 September 1999) is a Romanian rower. She is an Olympic champion and won the gold medal in the women's eight at the 2024 Summer Olympics. Rusu is also a two-time world champion in eight and seven-time European champion, including titles in eight and coxless four. She competed in the women's eight event at the 2020 Summer Olympics.
