= Victoria-Ștefania Petreanu =

Romanian rower

Personal information
- Nationality: Romanian
- Born: 21 January 2003 (age 23) Constanța, Romania

Sport
- Country: Romania
- Sport: Rowing
- Event: Eight
Medal record
Women's rowing
Representing Romania
Olympic Games
Gold medal – first place	2024 Paris	Eight
World Championships
Gold medal – first place	2022 Račice	Eight
Gold medal – first place	2023 Belgrade	Eight
Gold medal – first place	2025 Shanghai	Mixed eight
Gold medal – first place	2026 Amsterdam	Eight
Gold medal – first place	2026 Amsterdam	Mixed eight
Silver medal – second place	2025 Shanghai	Eight
European Championships
Gold medal – first place	2023 Bled	Eight
Gold medal – first place	2024 Szeged	Eight
Gold medal – first place	2026 Varese	Eight
Gold medal – first place	2026 Varese	Mixed eight

Victoria-Ștefania Petreanu (born 21 January 2003) is a Romanian rowing coxswain. She is an Olympic champion and won the gold medal in the women's eight at the 2024 Summer Olympics. Petreanu is also a two-time world champion and two-time European champion in eight.
