= Lisanne Van Der Lelij =

Dutch rower (born 1996)

Personal information
- Nationality: Dutch
- Born: 17 July 1996 (age 30)

Sport
- Country: Netherlands
- Sport: Rowing
- Event: Eight
Medal record
Women's rowing
Representing the Netherlands
World Championships
Gold medal – first place	2025 Shanghai	Eight
European Championships
Silver medal – second place	2025 Plovdiv	Quadruple sculls
World University Games
Silver medal – second place	2021 Chengdu	Eight

Lisanne Van Der Lelij (born 17 July 1996) is a Dutch rower.

== Career ==
In June 2025, Van Der Lelij competed at the 2025 European Rowing Championships and won a bronze medal in the quadruple sculls. In September 2025, she competed at the 2025 World Rowing Championships and won a gold medal in the eight with a time of 6:08.10. This was the Netherland's first gold in the event at the World Rowing Championships. Van der Lelij was only in her second year on the national team. The Dutch eight were subsequently named the 2025 World Rowing Women's Crew of the Year.
