= Vera Sneijders =

Dutch rower (born 2001)

Personal information
- Nationality: Dutch
- Born: 4 March 2001 (age 25)

Sport
- Country: Netherlands
- Sport: Rowing
- Event: Eight
Medal record
Women's rowing
Representing the Netherlands
World Championships
Gold medal – first place	2025 Shanghai	Eight
European Championships
Silver medal – second place	2025 Plovdiv	Eight
World U23 Championships
Gold medal – first place	2022 Varese	Quadruple sculls
Silver medal – second place	2021 Račice	Eight

Vera Sneijders (born 4 March 2001) is a Dutch rower.

== Career ==
In June 2025, Sneijders competed at the 2025 European Rowing Championships and won a silver medal in the eight. In September 2025, she competed at the 2025 World Rowing Championships and won a gold medal in the eight with a time of 6:08.10. This was the Netherland's first gold in the event at the World Rowing Championships. The Dutch eight were subsequently named the 2025 World Rowing Women's Crew of the Year.
