= Amalia Chelaru =

Romanian rower (born 1997)

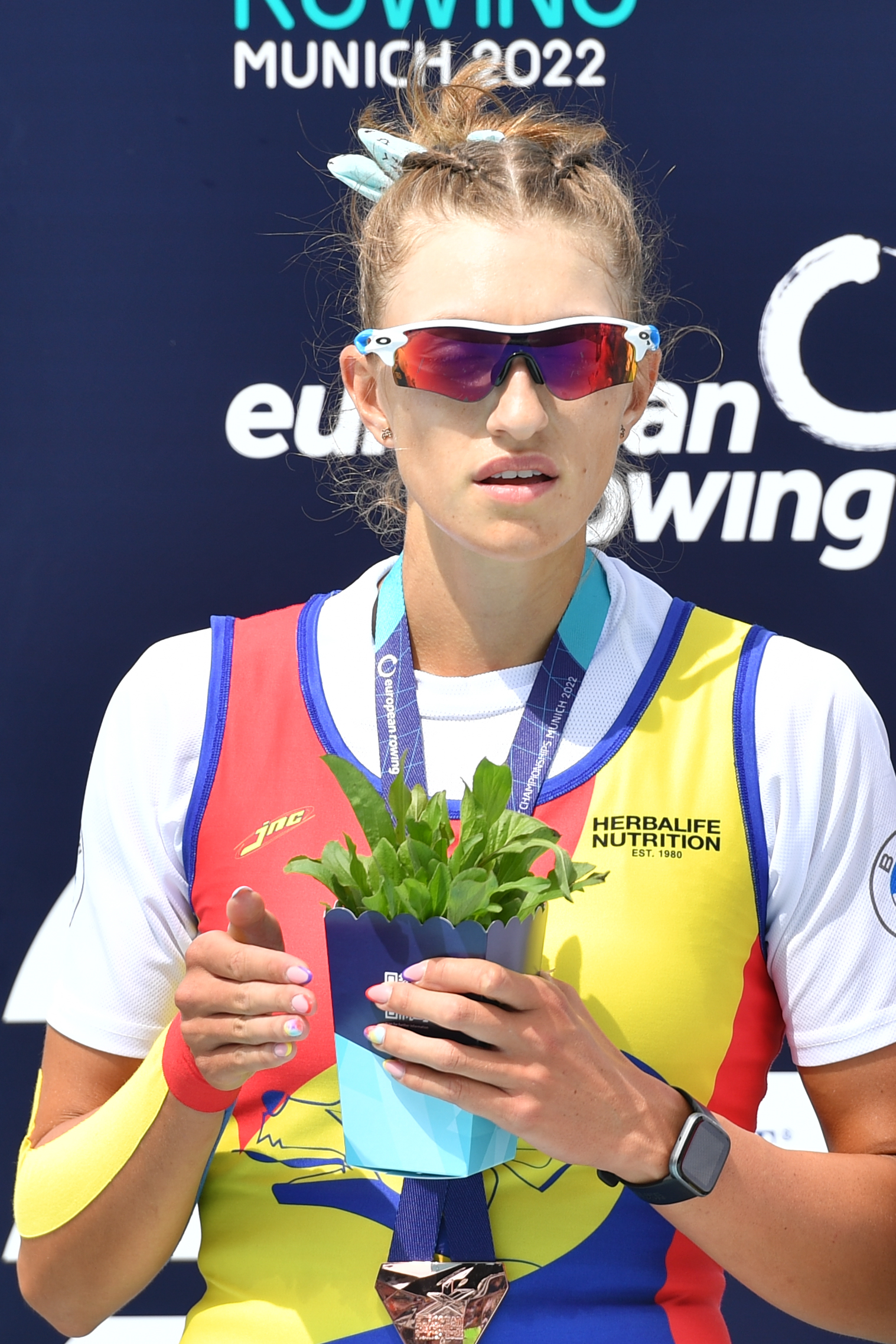
- Chelaru in 2022

Personal information
- Nationality: Romanian
- Born: 18 June 1997 (age 29) Pașcani, Romania
- Height: 1.88 m (6 ft 2 in)

Sport
- Country: Romania
- Sport: Rowing
- Events: Eight; Coxless four
Medal record
Women's rowing
Representing Romania
Olympic Games
Gold medal – first place	2024 Paris	Eight
World Championships
Gold medal – first place	2022 Račice	Eight
Gold medal – first place	2023 Belgrade	Eight
Gold medal – first place	2026 Amsterdam	Eight
Gold medal – first place	2026 Amsterdam	Mixed eight
Silver medal – second place	2023 Belgrade	Coxless four
Silver medal – second place	2025 Shanghai	Coxless four
Silver medal – second place	2025 Shanghai	Eight
European Championships
Gold medal – first place	2019 Lucerne	Eight
Gold medal – first place	2020 Poznań	Eight
Gold medal – first place	2021 Varese	Eight
Gold medal – first place	2022 Oberschleißheim	Eight
Gold medal – first place	2023 Bled	Coxless four
Gold medal – first place	2023 Bled	Eight
Gold medal – first place	2024 Szeged	Eight
Gold medal – first place	2026 Varese	Eight
Gold medal – first place	2026 Varese	Mixed eight
Silver medal – second place	2024 Szeged	Coxless four
Silver medal – second place	2025 Plovdiv	Coxless four
Bronze medal – third place	2022 Oberschleißheim	Coxless four

Amalia Chelaru (née Bereș; born 18 June 1997) is a Romanian rower. She is an Olympic champion and won the gold medal in the women's eight at the 2024 Summer Olympics. Chelaru is also a two-time world champion in eight and seven-time European champion, including titles in eight and coxless four. She competed in the women's eight at the 2020 Summer Olympics. Chelaru is the younger sister of fellow rower Mădălina Bereș.
