= Grégoire Bireau =

French Paralympic rower

Personal information
- Born: 20 November 2002 (age 23)
- Home town: Toulouse, France

Sport
- Country: France
- Sport: Pararowing
- Disability class: PR3
Medal record
Pararowing
Representing France
Paralympic Games
Bronze medal – third place	2024 Paris	PR3Mix4+
World Championships
Bronze medal – third place	2026 Amsterdam	PR3Mix4+
European Championships
Silver medal – second place	2024 Szeged	PR3Mix4+
Bronze medal – third place	2026 Varese	PR3Mix4+

Grégoire Bireau (born 20 November 2002) is a French pararower. He represented France at the 2024 Summer Paralympics.

== Career ==
Bireau represented France at the 2024 Summer Paralympics and won a bronze medal in the mixed cox four event.
