= Amsterdam International Community School =

Coordinates: 52.331861°N 4.864865°E

Amsterdam International Community School (AICS)
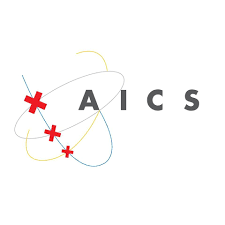

Location
- Arent Janszoon Ernststraat 1179; Amsterdam, North Holland 1081 HL

Information
- Established: 2003
- Principal: Rynette de Villiers
- Grades: Group 1 – DP2 & CP2
- Language: English
- Color: Turquoise Dark Blue Dark Orange Mustard Yellow
- Nickname: AICS
- Website: https://aics.espritscholen.nl

The Amsterdam International Community School or AICS, is a school in the South and South East of Amsterdam established in 2003 which accepts children from 4 to 18 years old. It is a part of the Esprit Scholengroep. AICS is made up of 2 different campuses (South and South East, known as Sandcastle). The AICS has more than 2000 students from various cultures and nationalities to reach their goal of diversity.

AICS is an English-language Dutch public international school and offers both Primary education and Secondary education with the possibility of the IB diploma and the IB Career-related Programme diploma to be achieved.

== Leadership ==
Rynette de Villiers is the current Principal of the school, she started in 2021. Annette Sloan was the director of the school from 2018 - 2020. Nico de Vrede was interim director in the first half of 2018. From 2006-2017 Kees van Ruitenbeek was the principal, he continued to lead the projects for realisation of new buildings until the end of 2020. From 2003-2006 Sylvia Visser was the first principal of AICS, she requested the license to start the school in 2002 while working as the principal of the Berlage Lyceum, also located in the south of Amsterdam.

The school has two deputy principals, Netty Foley (curriculum) and Noorul Choudhury (Business) Boris Prickarts has been deputy director (previously known as headmaster) since the start of the school in 2003 until he left in June 2020. The AICS is working with a team of heads of school (previously known as leaders for learning) for each part of the school (9 in 2020). Finally there is a leader of operations and a leader of administration.

== AICS South ==
AICS South used to be located near the WTC in the south of Amsterdam (Prinses Irenestraat 59). It is the largest and first campus of the AICS, located here since 2007. It had more than 1000 students attending. This campus offers primary education to children aged 4 to 11 and secondary (IB MYP) education to children aged 11 to 16. Finally it offers the IB Diploma Programme for students aged 16-18.

From 2003-2007 the secondary school was located at the Wodanstraat 3. The primary school started at the Wodanstraat in 2004, moved to the Hygiëaplein in 2005 and to the Uiterwaardenstraat in 2006. In 2007 the primary and secondary school reunited at the Prinses Irenestraat.

The new South campus building opened at the Arent Janszoon Ernststraat 1179 at the start of 2022. It is a purpose built school building designed by Mecanoo architects.

== AICS Satellite ==
AICS Satellite was opened in 2016 due to the increasing demand for international education in Amsterdam. It is located at Arent Janszoon Ernststraat 130, opposite the mall Gelderlandplein. It has approximately 200 students attending. It offers primary education for children age 4 to 11.

The campus closed in 2023 to merge with the South and Southeast (Sand Castle) campuses.

== AICS South East ==
This campus is the latest addition. It was previously located at the Darlingstraat 2 in the South East area of Amsterdam. There, it had more than 300 students attending. It is now located in the Sand Castle in Bijlmerplein, Amsterdam-Zuidoost. It offers primary education to children aged 4 to 11 and secondary (IB MYP) education to children aged 11 to 16.

It started in 2018 at the President Brandstraat 29 in the Eastern part of the city. In 2019 the construction of the modular and circular building at the Darlingstraat was completed and the campus moved there.

In 2020, renovations of the Sand Castle in Bijlmerplein (formerly the headquarters of ING until 2017) began for the campus' expansion.

In September of 2023, the campus officially moved to the Sand Castle in Bijlmerplein to begin the school year of 2023-2024.
