= Simona Radiș =

Romanian rower

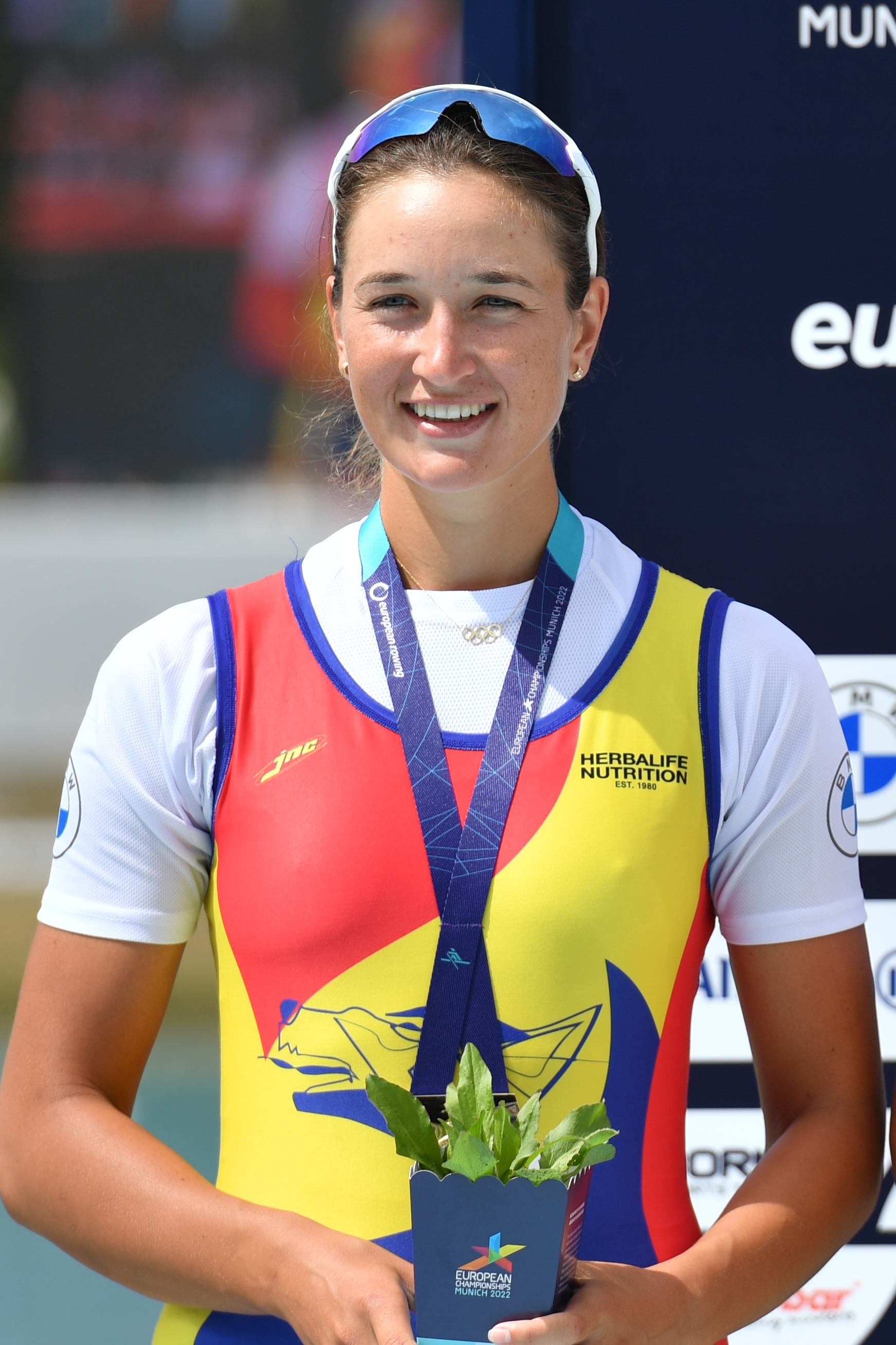
- Radiș in 2022

Personal information
- Full name: Simona Geanina Radiș
- Born: 5 April 1999 (age 27) Botoșani, Romania
- Height: 184 cm (6 ft 0 in)

Sport
- Country: Romania
- Sport: Rowing
- Event: Double sculls
- Club: Steaua București
- Coached by: Antonio Colamonici; Dorin Alupei
Medal record
Women's rowing
Representing Romania
Olympic Games
Gold medal – first place	2020 Tokyo	Double sculls
Gold medal – first place	2024 Paris	Eight
Silver medal – second place	2024 Paris	Double sculls
World Championships
Gold medal – first place	2022 Račice	Double sculls
Gold medal – first place	2022 Račice	Eight
Gold medal – first place	2023 Belgrade	Double sculls
Gold medal – first place	2025 Shanghai	Coxless pair
Gold medal – first place	2025 Shanghai	Mixed eight
Gold medal – first place	2026 Amsterdam	Coxless pair
Gold medal – first place	2026 Amsterdam	Eight
Gold medal – first place	2026 Amsterdam	Mixed eight
Silver medal – second place	2019 Ottensheim	Double sculls
European Championships
Gold medal – first place	2020 Poznań	Double sculls
Gold medal – first place	2021 Varese	Double sculls
Gold medal – first place	2022 Oberschleißheim	Double sculls
Gold medal – first place	2022 Oberschleißheim	Eight
Gold medal – first place	2023 Bled	Double sculls
Gold medal – first place	2023 Bled	Eight
Gold medal – first place	2024 Szeged	Eight
Gold medal – first place	2025 Plovdiv	Coxless pair
Gold medal – first place	2026 Varese	Coxless pair
Gold medal – first place	2026 Varese	Eight
Silver medal – second place	2019 Lucerne	Double sculls
Bronze medal – third place	2024 Szeged	Double sculls

Simona Geanina Radiș (born 5 April 1999) is a Romanian rower who predominantly competes in double sculls, together with Ancuța Bodnar. She is a two-time Olympic champion and won the gold medal in the women's double sculls at the 2020 Summer Olympics, the gold medal in the women's eight and the silver medal in the women's double sculls at the 2024 Summer Olympics. Radiș is also a two-time world champion and a four-time European champion in double sculls, and a world champion and three-time European champion in eight.
