= Nina Castagna =

American rower (born 2000)

Personal information
- Born: Cristina Castagna; June 21, 2000 (age 26)
- Height: 5 ft 5 in (165 cm)

Sport
- Country: United States
- Sport: Rowing
- Event: Eight
- College team: Washington Huskies
Medal record
World Championships
Bronze medal – third place	2026 Amsterdam	Eight

Cristina Castagna (/kəˈstɑːnjə/ kə-STAHN-yə; born June 21, 2000) is an American rowing coxswain. She represented the United States in the women's eight at the 2024 Summer Olympics, where they placed fifth.

== Career ==
Castagna was raised in Cincinnati, Ohio, and attended Walnut Hills High School. She wanted to row as a high school freshman but was instead trained to cox because of her size at 4 feet 10 inches (1.47 m) and 78 pounds (35 kg).

Castagna attended the University of Washington, where she competed with the Huskies rowing team from 2019 to 2023. She finished as high as second place in the varsity eight at the NCAA championships. She was given first-team All-Pac-12 honors three times and first-team All-American during her final season.

Castagna won silver with the United States in the women's eight at the 2023 World Rowing Championships. Castagna was selected to cox the United States women's eight at the 2024 Summer Olympics in France.
