= Ella Bramwell =

Australian rower

Personal information
- Nationality: Australian
- Born: 8 June 1999 (age 25)
- Home town: Adelaide, South Australia
- Height: 187 cm (6 ft 2 in)

Sport
- Country: Australia
- Sport: Rowing
- Club: Adelaide Rowing Club
- Coached by: John Keogh, Tom Westgarth

Ella Bramwell (born 8 June 1999) is an Australian representative sweep-oar rower. She has represented at senior World Championships and won medals at World Rowing Cups.

== Club and state rowing ==
Bramwell is a South Australian. Her senior club rowing has been from the Adelaide Rowing Club

Bramwell first made state selection for South Australia in the 2017 women's youth eight which contested the Bicentennial Cup at the Interstate Regatta within the Australian Rowing Championships. She made her second and third South Australian youth eight appearance in 2018 and 2019. In 2021 Bramwell moved into the South Australia women's senior eight which contested the Queen's Cup at the Interstate Regatta.

== International representative rowing ==
In March 2022 Bramwell was selected in the Australian training squad to prepare for the 2022 international season and the 2022 World Rowing Championships. She rowed in the five seat of the Australian women's eight at World Rowing Cups II and III taking bronze in Poznan and winning gold in Lucerne. At the 2022 World Rowing Championships at Racize, she was again in the Australian women's senior eight. They made the A final and finished in fifth place.
