= Ciprian Tudosă =

Romanian rower

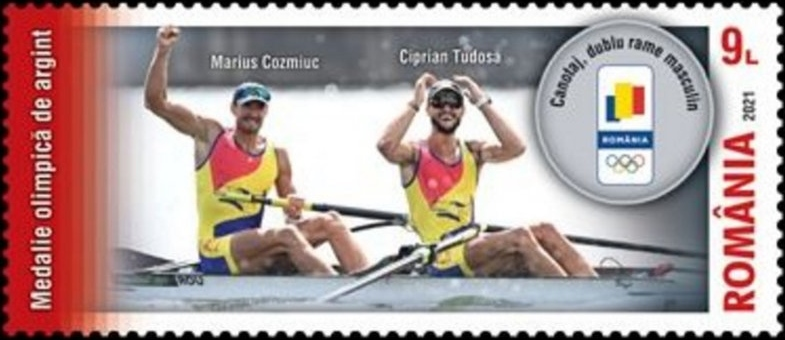
- Tudosă (right) at the 2020 Summer Olympics

Personal information
- Full name: Ciprian Tudosă
- Born: 31 March 1997 (age 29) Fălticeni, Romania
- Education: University of Bacău
- Height: 197 cm (6 ft 6 in)

Sport
- Sport: Rowing
- Club: CN Nicu Gane Falticeni
- Coached by: Vasile Avramia
Medal record
Men's rowing
Representing Romania
Olympic Games
Silver medal – second place	2020 Tokyo	Coxless pair
World Championships
Gold medal – first place	2025 Shanghai	Mixed eight
Gold medal – first place	2026 Amsterdam	Mixed eight
Silver medal – second place	2018 Plovdiv	Coxless pair
Silver medal – second place	2025 Shanghai	Coxless four
European Championships
Gold medal – first place	2020 Poznań	Coxless pair
Gold medal – first place	2025 Plovdiv	Coxless four
Silver medal – second place	2017 Račice	Coxless four
Silver medal – second place	2019 Lucerne	Coxless pair
Silver medal – second place	2023 Bled	Eight
Silver medal – second place	2026 Varese	Coxless four
Bronze medal – third place	2018 Glasgow	Coxless pair
Bronze medal – third place	2022 Oberschleißheim	Quadruple sculls
Bronze medal – third place	2024 Szeged	Eight
World Junior Championships
Gold medal – first place	2015 Rio de Janeiro	Coxless four

Ciprian Tudosă (born 31 March 1997) is a Romanian rower. Comppeting in coxless pairs, together with Marius Cozmiuc, he won silver medals at the 2018 World Rowing Championships and 2020 Summer Olympics.
