= Clara Guerra =

Italian rower

Personal information
- National team: Italy
- Born: 1 October 1998 (age 27) Verona, Italy

Sport
- Sport: Rowing
- Club: G.S. Fiamme Gialle
Medal record
Women's rowing
Representing Italy
European Championships
Bronze medal – third place	2025 Plovdiv	Eight
Bronze medal – third place	2026 Varese	Eight
Event	1st	2nd	3rd
World Championships	1	2	2
European Championships	0	2	3
Total	1	4	5

Clara Guerra (born 1 October 1998) is an Italian lightweight rower who won medals at senior level at the World Rowing Championships and European Rowing Championships.

== Biography ==
Guerra started the activity in 2010, having her senior debut in 2017. In addition to the two international medals won at a senior level, at the youth level she won six more medals, always between World and European championships (including a Junior World Record in 2016, Rotterdam. JW1x, Final time: 7:34.47).

== Achievements ==
Year	Competition	Venue	Rank	Event	Time
2018	European Championships	(United Kingdom) Glasgow	3rd	Lightweight single sculls	7:47.71
2018	World Championships	(Romania) Plovdiv	2nd	Lightweight single sculls	7:51.96

== See also ==
- Italy at the 2018 European Championships
