= Charlotte Buck =

American rower

Personal information
- Born: February 15, 1995 (age 31) Nyack, New York, U.S.
- Education: Columbia University
- Height: 6 ft 0 in (183 cm)
- Weight: 180 lb (82 kg)

Sport
- Country: United States
- Sport: Rowing
- Event: Eight

Achievements and titles
- Olympic finals: Tokyo 2020 W8+
Medal record
Women's rowing
Representing the United States
World Championships
Silver medal – second place	2023 Belgrade	Eight
Bronze medal – third place	2026 Amsterdam	Eight

Charlotte Buck (born February 15, 1995) is an American rower. She competed at the 2020 Summer Olympics in the women's eight event. Buck is from Nyack, New York, and graduated from Nyack High School before attending Columbia University.
