= Ioana Vrînceanu =

Romanian rower (born 1994)

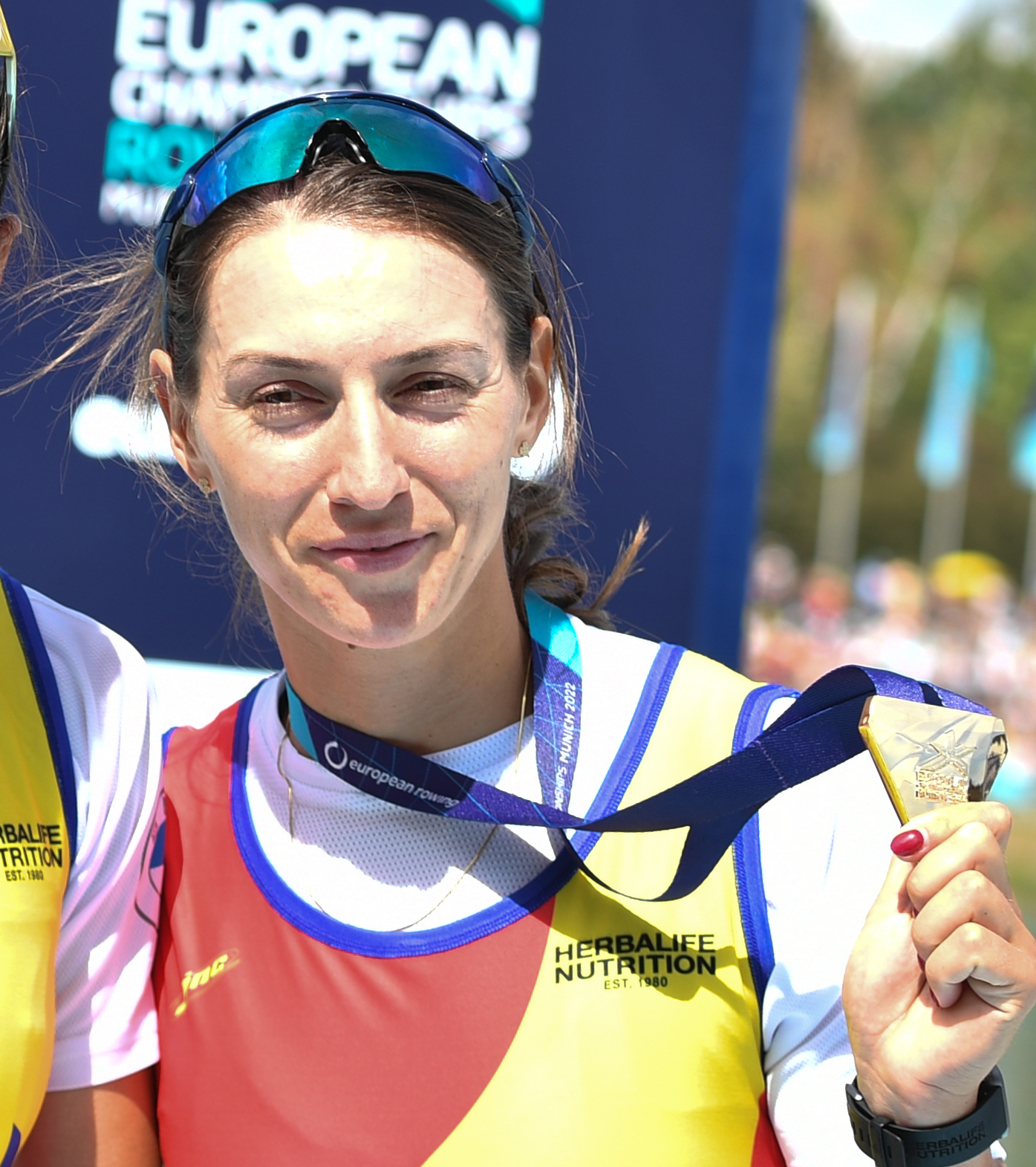
- Vrînceanu in 2022

Personal information
- Born: 7 March 1994 (age 32) Târgu Neamț, Romania
- Height: 1.79 m (5 ft 10 in)

Sport
- Country: Romania
- Sport: Rowing
- Event(s): Coxless pair Eight
- Club: CSA Steaua București
Medal record
Women's rowing
Representing Romania
Olympic Games
Gold medal – first place	2024 Paris	Eight
Silver medal – second place	2024 Paris	Coxless pair
World Championships
Gold medal – first place	2017 Sarasota	Eight
Gold medal – first place	2022 Račice	Eight
Gold medal – first place	2023 Belgrade	Eight
Bronze medal – third place	2023 Belgrade	Coxless pair
European Championships
Gold medal – first place	2017 Račice	Eight
Gold medal – first place	2018 Glasgow	Eight
Gold medal – first place	2020 Poznań	Eight
Gold medal – first place	2021 Varese	Eight
Gold medal – first place	2022 Oberschleißheim	Coxless pair
Gold medal – first place	2022 Oberschleißheim	Eight
Gold medal – first place	2023 Bled	Coxless pair
Gold medal – first place	2023 Bled	Eight
Gold medal – first place	2024 Szeged	Coxless pair
Gold medal – first place	2024 Szeged	Eight
Silver medal – second place	2019 Lucerne	Coxless four

Ioana Vrînceanu (born 7 March 1994) is a Romanian rower. She won the gold medal in the women's eight and the silver medal in the women's coxless pair with Roxana Anghel at the 2024 Summer Olympics. Vrînceanu is also a three-time world champion in eight and a ten-time European champion, including seven titles in eight and three titles in coxless pair. She competed at the 2020 Summer Olympics in the women's eight.
