= Aisha Rocek =

Italian rower (born 1998)

Personal information
- National team: Italy
- Born: 29 December 1998 (age 27) Erba, Italy

Sport
- Sport: Rowing
- Club: C.S. Carabinieri
- Start activity: 2015
Medal record
Event / 1st / 2nd / 3rd; European Championships / 0 / 1 / 1
World Championships
Silver medal – second place	2025 Shanghai	Mixed eight

Aisha Rocek (born 29 December 1998) is an Italian female rower bronze medal winner at senior level at the European Rowing Championships. She competed at the 2020 Summer Olympics, in Pair.

== Biography ==
Her mother Jana Tyrolova was a volleyball national team for the then Czechoslovakia, her father Jaroslav "Jaro" Rocek is a former rower. Her twin brother Patrick Rocek is also a rover. Both parents came to Italy from Czechoslovakia in 1981. In 2017 Aisha Rocek has joined the Carabinieri corps.
