= Dovilė Rimkutė =

Lithuanian rower (born 2001)

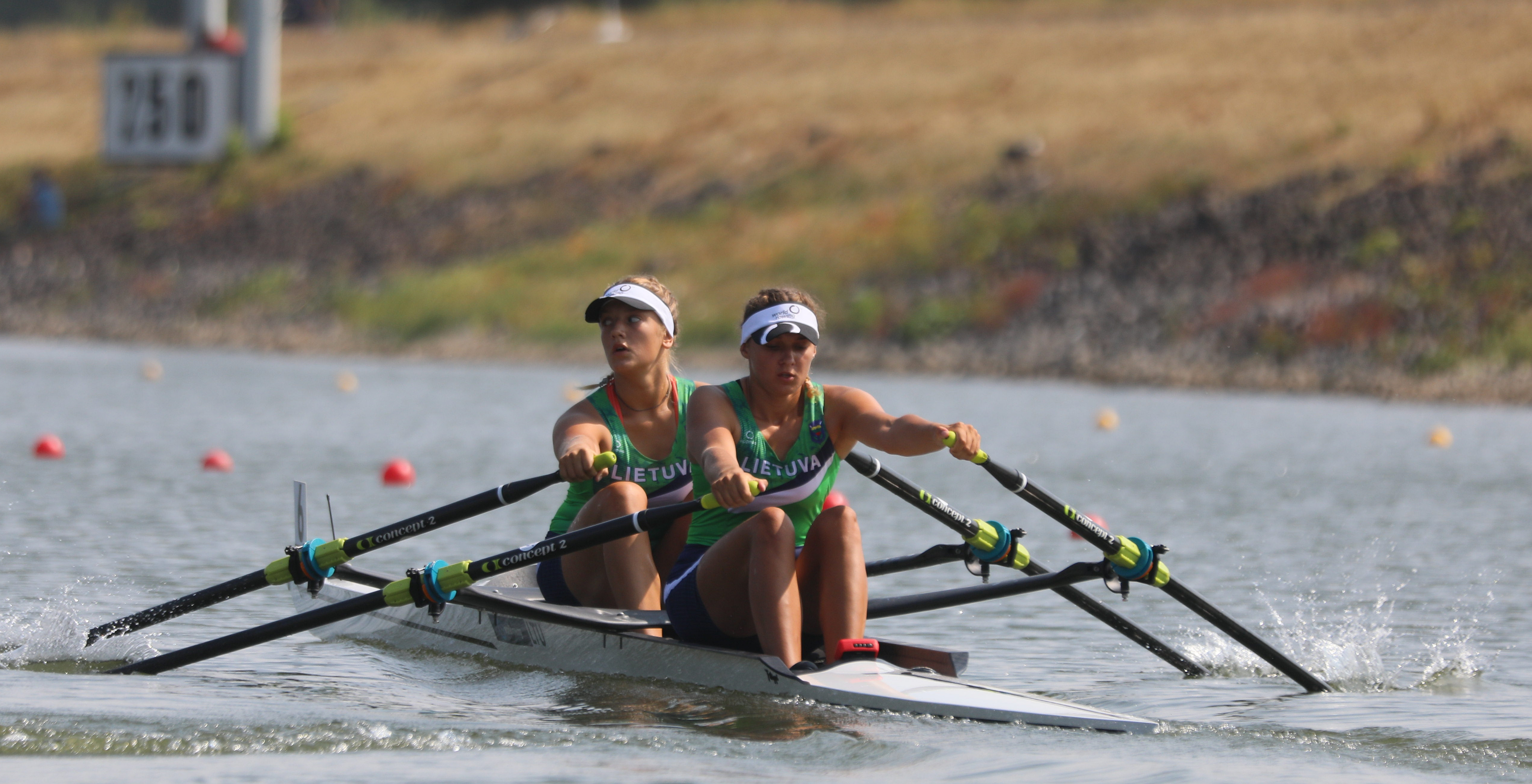
- Rimkutė at the 2018 World Junior Championships

Personal information
- Born: 8 October 2001 (age 24)

Sport
- Country: Lithuania
- Sport: Rowing
Medal record
Women's rowing
Representing Lithuania
World Championships
Silver medal – second place	2023 Belgrade	W2x
European Championships
Silver medal – second place	2023 Bled	W2x
Silver medal – second place	2024 Szeged	W2x
Bronze medal – third place	2026 Varese	W2x
World Junior Championships
Bronze medal – third place	2019 Tokyo	JW2x
European U23 Championships
Bronze medal – third place	2021 Kruszwica	BW2x
European Junior Championships
Gold medal – first place	2019 Essen	JW2x

Dovilė Rimkutė (born 8 October 2001) is a Lithuanian female rower. She won a silver medal at the 2023 European championships in women's double scull alongside Donata Karalienė.
