= Beatrice Giuliani =

Italian female rower

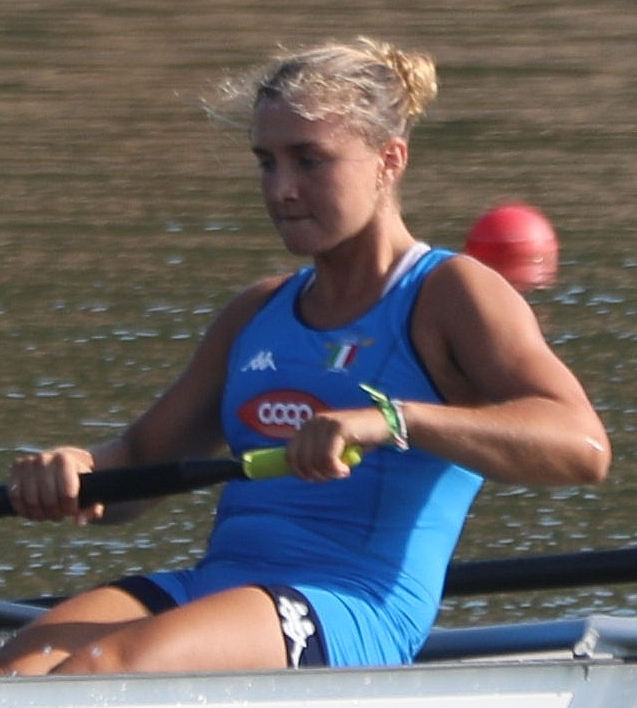
- Giuliani in 2018.

Personal information
- National team: Italy
- Born: 27 November 2002 (age 23) Milan, Italy

Sport
- Sport: Rowing
- Club: Società Canottieri Milano
Medal record
Women's rowing
Representing Italy
World Rowing Junior Championships
Gold medal – first place	2018 Račice	Coxed four
Gold medal – first place	2019 Tokyo	Coxed four
Bronze medal – third place	2019 Tokyo	Eight
European Rowing Junior Championships
Bronze medal – third place	2019 Essen	Coxed four

Beatrice Giuliani (born 27 November 2002) is an Italian rower who has won two gold medals at the World Rowing Junior Championships.
