= Lucrezia Baudino =

Italian rower

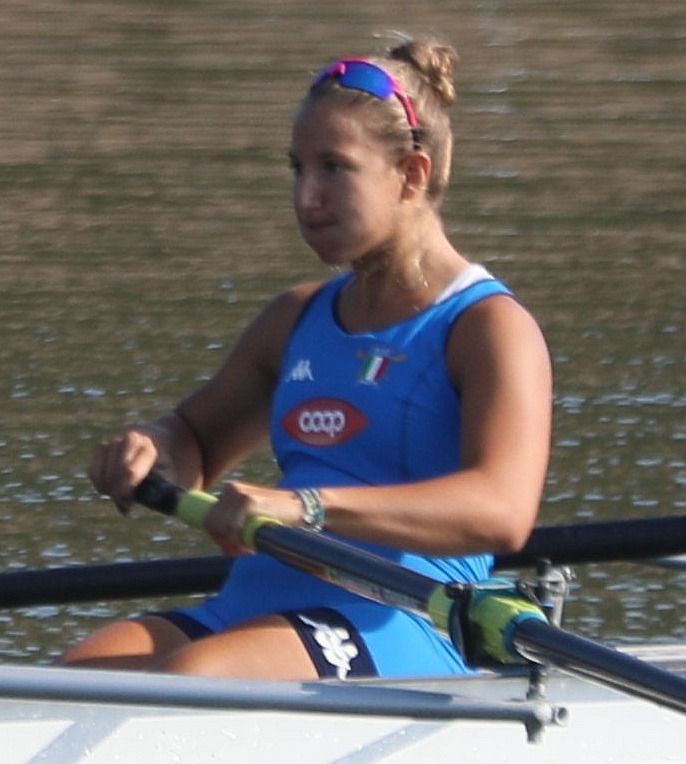
- Baudino in 2018.

Personal information
- National team: Italy
- Born: 3 July 2001 (age 24) Ivrea, Italy

Sport
- Sport: Rowing
- Club: Canottieri Candia 2010
Medal record
Women's rowing
Representing Italy
World Rowing U23 Championships
Bronze medal – third place	2021 Račice	Quadruple sculls
World Rowing Junior Championships
Gold medal – first place	2018 Račice	Coxed four
Gold medal – first place	2019 Tokyo	Coxed four
Bronze medal – third place	2019 Tokyo	Eight
European Rowing Junior Championships
Bronze medal – third place	2019 Essen	Coxed four

Lucrezia Baudino (born 3 July 2001) is an Italian rower who has won two gold medals at the World Rowing Junior Championships.
