= Clara Massaria =

Italian female rower

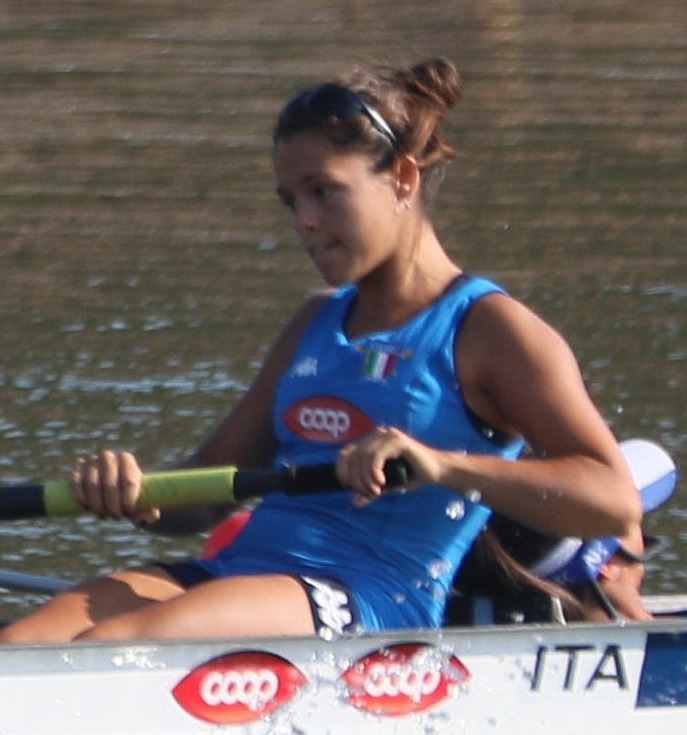
- Massaria in 2018.

Personal information
- National team: Italy
- Born: 3 April 2002 (age 24) Pisa, Italy

Sport
- Sport: Rowing
- Club: CUS Torino
Medal record
Women's rowing
Representing Italy
World Rowing U23 Championships
Bronze medal – third place	2021 Račice	Coxed four
World Rowing Junior Championships
Gold medal – first place	2018 Račice	Coxed four
Gold medal – first place	2019 Tokyo	Coxed four
Bronze medal – third place	2019 Tokyo	Eight
European Rowing Junior Championships
Silver medal – second place	2018 Gravelines	Coxless four
Bronze medal – third place	2019 Essen	Coxed four
Fixed seat rowing
Gold medal – first place	2026 Palio di San Ranieri	Sant'Antonio

Clara Massaria (born 3 April 2002) is an Italian rower who has won two gold medals at the World Rowing Junior Championships.

== Biography ==
Massaria started rowing at the age of 12 at Società Canottieri Arno. She first competed with the Italian junior team in 2018. In 2022, she moved to Turin and joined CUS Torino.

In 2026 she was the coxswain of Sant'Antonio in the it:Palio di San Ranieri. In that occasion Sant'Antonio returned to win the regatta after a 39-year winless spell.
