= Luka Đorđević (rower) =

Azerbaijani rower (born 1991)

Medal record

Representing Serbia

U23 World Championship
Gold medal – first place	2011 Amsterdam	Coxed fours
Gold medal – first place	2012 Trakai	Coxed fours

Junior World Championship
Gold medal – first place	2009 Brive-la-Gaillarde	Coxless pairs

Luka Đorđević (Serbian Cyrillic: Лука Ђорђевић, pronounced [lûːka dʑǒːrdʑeʋitɕ]; Azerbaijani: Luka Corceviç, born 12 May 1991 in Belgrade) is a Serbian-born Azerbaijani rower.

He won a gold medal at the 2011 World Rowing U23 Championships in Men's Coxed fours and posted U23 world record. He repeated the success in 2012.

Since 2013 he competes for Azerbaijan. In the past, he crewed for the Serbia National team from 2007 to 2011.
