= Leonardo Apuzzo =

Italian rower (born 2000)

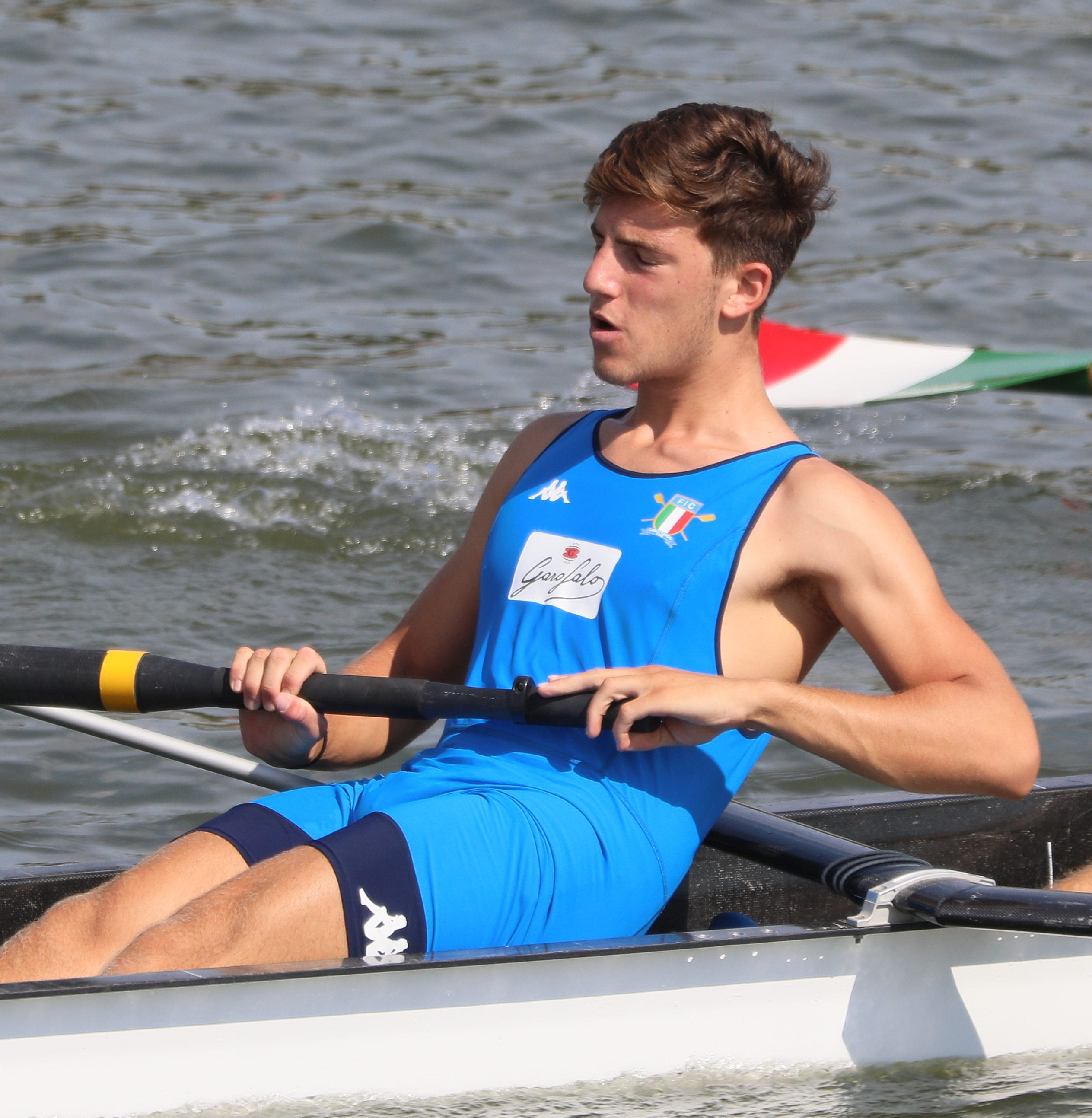
- Apuzzo in 2018.

Personal information
- National team: Italy
- Born: 16 August 2000 (age 25) Castellammare di Stabia, Italy

Sport
- Sport: Rowing
- Club: Circolo Nautico Stabia
Medal record
Event	1st	2nd	3rd
World Junior Championships	2	0	0
European Junior Championships	1	0	0
Total	3	0	0

Leonardo Apuzzo (born 16 August 2000) is an Italian rower twice world champion at junior level at the World Rowing Junior Championships.

== Achievements ==
Year	Competition	Venue	Rank	Event	Time
2017	World Junior Championships	(Lithuania) Trakai	1st	Coxed four	6:33.71
2018	European Junior Championships	(France) Gravelines	1st	Coxed four	6:38.26
2018	World Junior Championships	(Czech Republic) Račice	1st	Coxed four	6:17.49
