= Alessandro Calder =

Italian rower

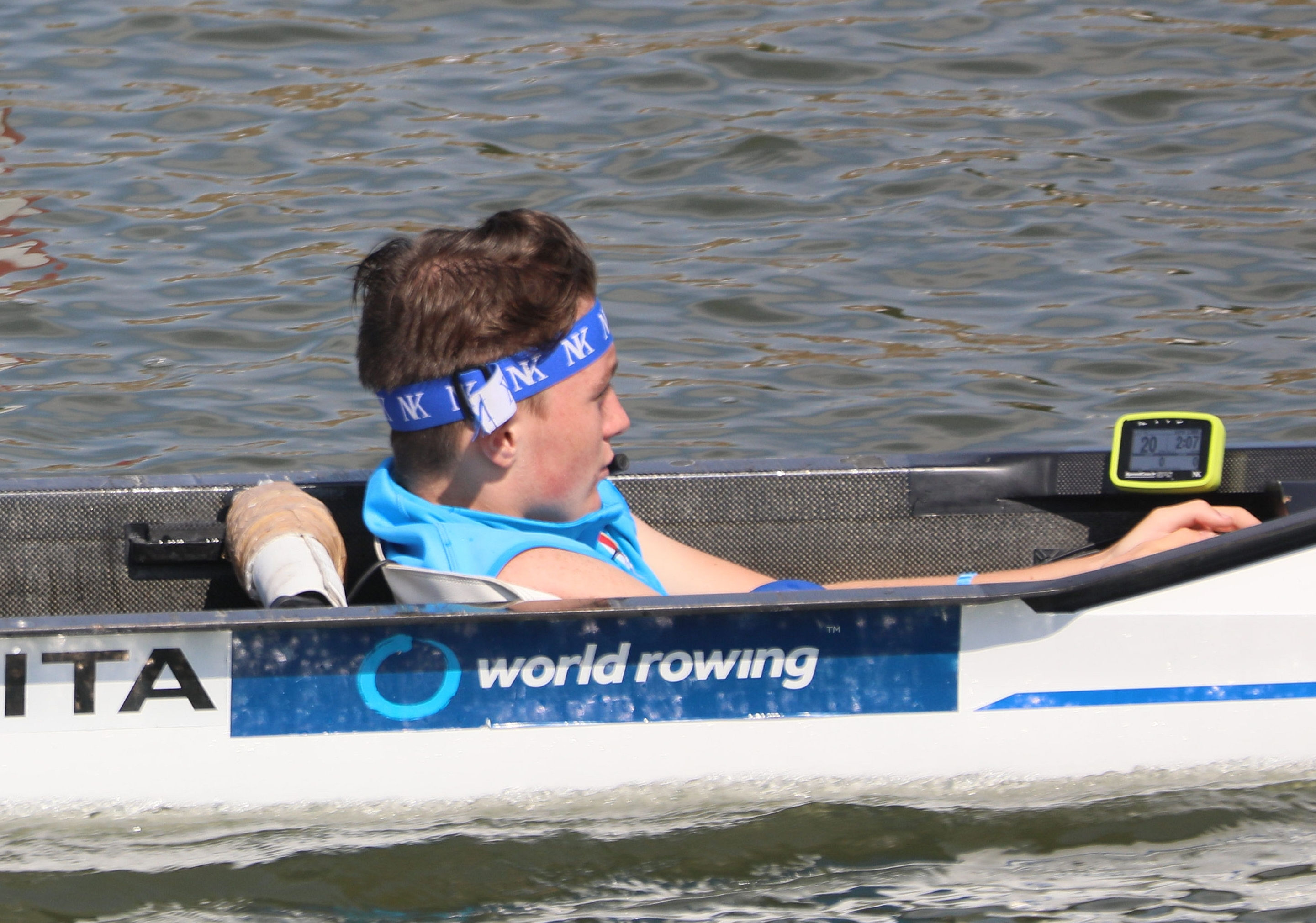
- Calder in 2018.

Personal information
- National team: Italy
- Born: 1 November 2001 (age 24) Sanremo, Italy

Sport
- Sport: Rowing
- Position: Coxwain
- Club: Rowing Club Genovese
Medal record
Event	1st	2nd	3rd
World Junior Championships	1	0	0
European Junior Championships	1	0	0
Total	2	0	0

Alessandro Calder (born 1 November 2001) is an Italian rower world champion at junior level at the World Rowing Junior Championships.

== Achievements ==
Year	Competition	Venue	Rank	Event	Time
2018	European Junior Championships	(France) Gravelines	1st	Coxed four	6:38.26
2018	World Junior Championships	(Czech Republic) Račice	1st	Coxed four	6:17.49
