= Nadine Agyemang-Heard =

Italian rower (born 2002)

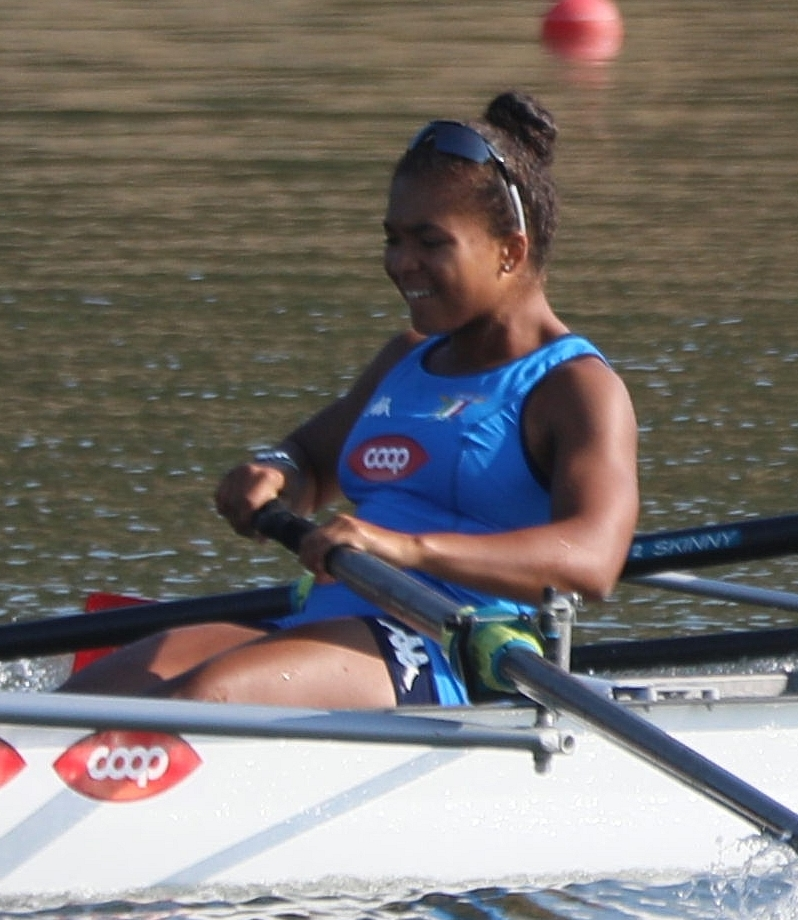
- Agyemang-Heard in 2018.

Personal information
- National team: Italy
- Born: 13 March 2002 (age 24) London, United Kingdom

Sport
- Sport: Rowing
- Club: Canottieri Moltrasio
Medal record
Event	1st	2nd	3rd
World Junior Championships	1	1	1
European Junior Championships	0	0	1
Total	1	1	2

Nadine Agyemang-Heard (born 13 March 2002) is an Italian rower world champion at junior level at the World Rowing Junior Championships.

== Achievements ==
Year	Competition	Venue	Rank	Event	Time
2018	World Junior Championships	(Czech Republic) Račice	1st	Coxed four	7:14.19
2019	European Junior Championships	(Germany) Essen	3rd	Coxless pair	7:25.33
2019	World Junior Championships	(Japan) Tokyo	2nd	Coxless four	7:05.28
2019	World Junior Championships	(Japan) Tokyo	3rd	Eight	6:37.49
