= 2019 European Rowing Junior Championships =

- Venue: Baldeneysee regatta
- Location: Essen, Germany
- Dates: 18–19 May 2019
- Competitors: 570 from 34 nations

The 2019 European Rowing Junior Championships (U19) took place in Essen, Germany, between 18 and 19 May 2019.

== Medal summary ==
=== Men ===
Event	Gold	Time	Silver	Time	Bronze	Time
JM1x	Tristan Vandenbussche; Belgium	6:56.60	Ivan Brynza; Belarus	6:57.52	Tim Roth; Switzerland	7:00.87
JM2-	Germany (GER); Ben Gebauer; Tjark Löwa	6:43.56	Denmark (DEN); Casper Pedersen; Tobias Bork Kristensen	6:44.82	Italy (ITA); Emilio Pappalettera; Alessandro Gardino	6:45.10
JM2x	Germany (GER); Paul Krüger; Aaron Erfanian	6:22.59	Italy (ITA); Matteo Sartori; Nicolò Carucci	6:23.71	Greece (GRE); Vasileios Baroutas; Dimitrios Stasinos	6:27.22
JM4-	Germany (GER); Mark Hinrichs; Hanno Brach; Bruno Spät; Cedric Wiemer	6:04.40	Greece (GRE); Ioannis Petalotidis; Leonidas Palaiopanos; Dimitrios Zografos; Theodoros Lapikof	6:08.13	Italy (ITA); Giorgio Battigaglia; Alessandro Bonamoneta; Achille Benazzo; Francesco Cella	6:10.73
JM4x	Czech Republic (CZE); Jakub Kyncl; Jan Vacek; Marek Diblík; Tomáš Zobal	5:55.98	Germany (GER); Paul Leerkamp; Sören Henkel; Hermann Krüger; Nils Stutz	5:56.55	Russia (RUS); Vladimir Gayevskiy; Viktor Kovalev; Aleksandr Kovalskiy; Egor Grachev	5:58.98
JM4+	Germany (GER); Erik Bruns; Nikolas Rossbach; Paul Röder; Leon Braatz; Florian Wünscher	6:19.88	Ireland (IRL); Matthew Gallagher; James O'Donovan; Jack Dorney; John Kearney; Leah O'Regan	6:20.18	Turkey (TUR); Mert Ali Dağlı; Cavit Caner Başaran; Ahmet Eren Savaş; Emir Saygılı; Toprak Ata Kıvrak	6:22.12
JM8+	Germany (GER); Nikita Mohr; Joshua Klaas; Julius Matischik; Mattis Koch; Gero Hensengerth; Erik Kohlbach; Frederik Breuer; Korwin Hildebrandt; Julius Fabry	5:46.08	Poland (POL); Patryk Wojtalak; Borys Kaliber; Julian Kościuk; Łukasz Kasztelan; Bartosz Bartkowski; Oskar Streich; Jerzy Kaczmarek; Krzysztof Jagodziński; Radosław Gromowski	5:48.38	Russia (RUS); Pavel Bakhaev; Denis Verbenko; Vladislav Burmistrov; Kirill Puzynia; Lev Zakharov; Ivan Kladov; Oleg Dudko; Danil Liashchuk; Evgeniy Suvorov	5:48.39

=== Women ===
Event	Gold	Time	Silver	Time	Bronze	Time
JW1x	Daria Stavynoha; Ukraine	7:43.94	Maria Kyridou; Greece	7:45.25	Alexandra Föster; Germany	7:51.68
JW2-	Czech Republic (CZE); Eliška Podrazilová; Anna Šantrůčková	7:18.58	Germany (GER); Noreen Junges; Maike Böttcher	7:21.44	Italy (ITA); Nadine Agyemang-Heard; Arianna Passini	7:25.33
JW2x	Lithuania (LTU); Ugnė Juzėnaitė; Dovilė Rimkutė	7:07.41	Italy (ITA); Anna Benazzo; Giulia Bosio	7:08.52	Germany (GER); Jette Prehm; Judith Guhse	7:10.19
JW4-	Germany (GER); Magdalena Rabl; Luisa Gathmann; Lisa Weber; Clara Oberdorfer	6:45.45	Italy (ITA); Matilde Barison; Serena Mossi; Ilaria Compagnoni; Greta Schwartz	6:47.41	Denmark (DEN); Mathilde Kiilgaard; Christine Cardel; Cecilie Brünnich; Marie Ramm	6:48.21
JW4x	Germany (GER); Alina Henze; Hannah Grimm; Luise Bachmann; Sarah Wibberenz	6:38.46	Italy (ITA); Alice Ramella; Alexandra Kushnir; Laura Pagnoncelli; Ilaria Corazza	6:40.44	Czech Republic (CZE); Barbora Podrazilová; Marie Štefková; Nikola Kropáčková; Simona Pašková	6:40.58
JW4+	Germany (GER); Tori Schwerin; Mathilda Kitzmann; Amelie Sens; Lena Kolwey; Annalena Fisch	7:02.30	France (FRA); Eva Klimacek; Lou-Anne Caniard; Gwendoline Toutoux; Ombeline Lucas; Mathilde Varnet	7:06.38	Italy (ITA); Clara Massaria; Lucrezia Baudino; Beatrice Giuliani; Lucia Rebuffo; Giulia Clerici	7:08.32
JW8+	Russia (RUS); Mariia Rakova; Sofiia Ozhereleva; Nataliia Kholopova; Liliana Pushkareva; Sofiia Demateva; Anastasiia Bazhenova; Svetlana Titova; Ekaterina Pankova; Pavel Gryzunov	6:27.51	Germany (GER); Pia Renner; Paula Burbott; Antonia Galland; Stina Roebbecke; Elisa Patzelt; Olivia Clotten; Helena Spanke; Cecilia Sommerfeld; Emilie Meyer	6:31.05	Czech Republic (CZE); Nella Martincová; Vanda Nejedlová; Valentýna Klimková; Simona Kohoutová; Veronika Skružná; Emma Benýšková; Veronika Činková; Magdalena Kindlová; Vilém Vítek	6:32.80

=== Medal table ===
* Host nation (Germany)

Rank	Nation	Gold	Silver	Bronze	Total
1	Germany (GER)*	8	3	2	13
2	Czech Republic (CZE)	2	0	2	4
3	Russia (RUS)	1	0	2	3
4	Belgium (BEL)	1	0	0	1
4	Lithuania (LTU)	1	0	0	1
4	Ukraine (UKR)	1	0	0	1
7	Italy (ITA)	0	4	4	8
8	Greece (GRE)	0	2	1	3
9	Denmark (DEN)	0	1	1	2
10	Belarus (BLR)	0	1	0	1
10	France (FRA)	0	1	0	1
10	Ireland (IRL)	0	1	0	1
10	Poland (POL)	0	1	0	1
14	Switzerland (SUI)	0	0	1	1
14	Turkey (TUR)	0	0	1	1
Totals (15 entries)		14	14	14	42
