= Vaires-sur-Marne Nautical Stadium =

French nautical stadium

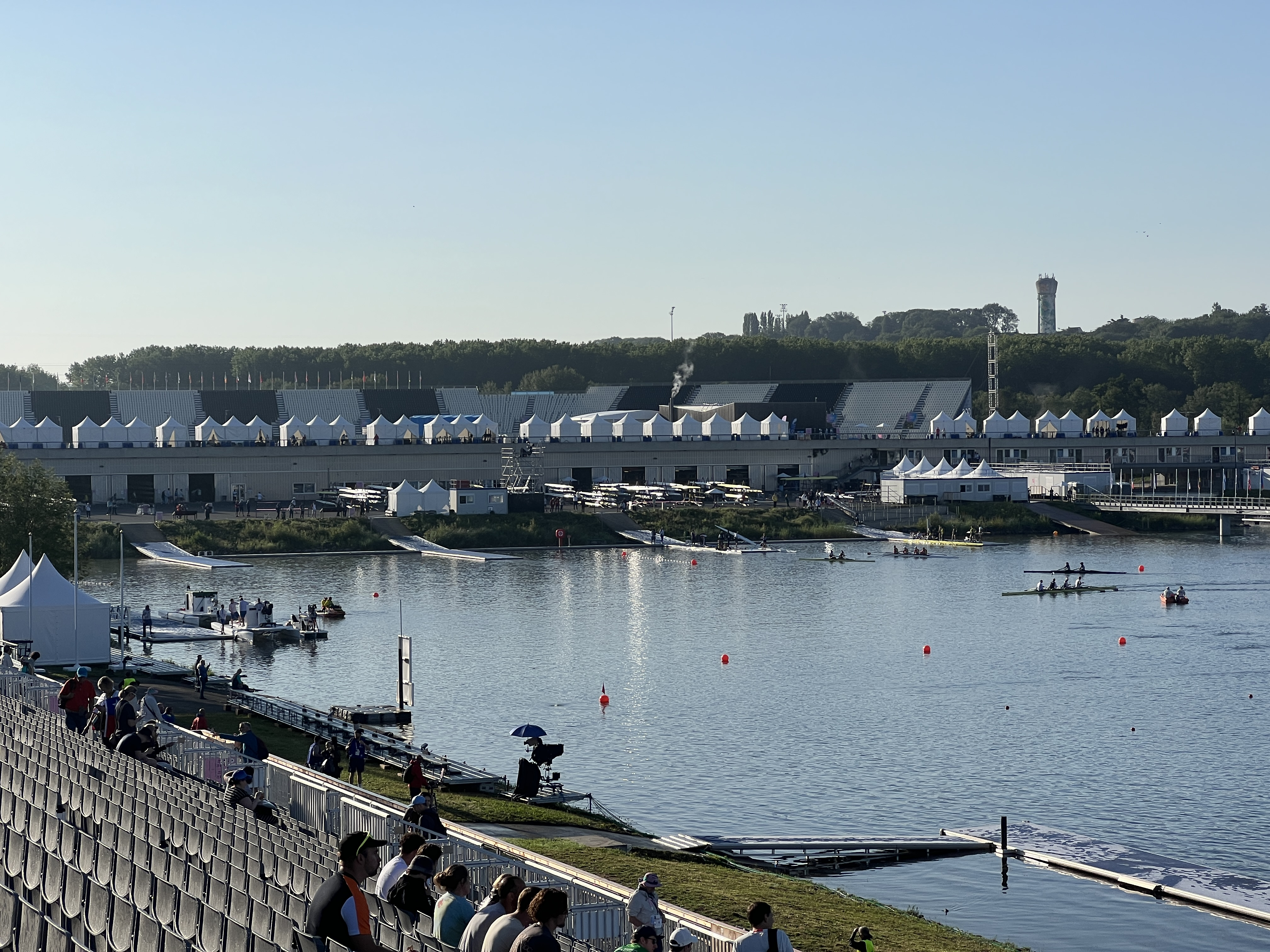
- Vaires-sur-Marne Nautical Stadium during the 2024 Summer Olympics

- Location within France
- Location: Vaires-sur-Marne, France
- Coordinates: 48.8636°N 2.6240°E
- Designation: Auer Weber
- Built: 2016–2019
- Max. length: 150 m (490 ft), 300 m (980 ft) and 2,200 m (7,200 ft) courses
- Surface area: 370 acres (150 ha)
- Surface elevation: 39 m (128 ft)

The Vaires-sur-Marne Nautical Stadium also known as the Olympic Nautical Stadium D'île-De-France is a regatta venue for rowing and canoeing, situated in Vaires-sur-Marne, Île-de-France and in the proximity of the Marne River.

== History ==
The venue is known for hosting various aquatic events since the 20th century. Several of them have been the 1995 edition of the World Rowing Cup, the 2023 World Rowing Under 19 Championships and the 1991 ICF Canoe Sprint World Championships. The venue was renovated between 2016 and 2019 in order to host the 2024 Summer Olympics.

== Architecture and fittings ==
The venue's complex was designed by architects Auer+Weber+Assoziierte and stretches beyond the three main elements of the Vaires Torcy leisure base: the Vaires-Sur-Marne lake, the water stadium and the village area. The sports center spans upon a total of 4,400 meters. It mainly features the white water stadium with courses of 300 and 150 meters each. Additionally, it houses a 2,200 meter rowing and sprint canoe kayak course with a finishing tower. Other facilities within the complex include a sports medicine center, weight training center administrative spaces, media center, as training and accommodation facilities. The stadium of the venue has a total of 24,000 seats, of which 14,000 are standard seats and 10,000 are standing along the course seats.
