= 2026 World Rowing Under 19 Championships =

Rowing event

2026 World Rowing Under 19 Championship
- Venue: Plovdiv Regatta Venue
- Location: Plovdiv, Bulgaria
- Dates: 6–9 August

The 2026 World Rowing Under 19 Championships is the 59th edition of the World Rowing U19 Championships and was held from 6 to 9 August 2026 in Plovdiv, Bulgaria.

== Medal table ==
* Host nation (Bulgaria)

Rank	Nation	Gold	Silver	Bronze	Total
1	Germany (GER)	3	1	2	6
1	Romania (ROU)	3	1	2	6
3	Italy (ITA)	2	1	0	3
4	Great Britain (GBR)	1	3	1	5
5	Poland (POL)	1	2	0	3
6	Greece (GRE)	1	1	1	3
–	Authorised Neutral Athletes (ANA)	1	0	1	2
7	Estonia (EST)	1	0	0	1
7	Spain (ESP)	1	0	0	1
9	United States (USA)	0	1	1	2
10	Czech Republic (CZE)	0	1	0	1
10	Norway (NOR)	0	1	0	1
10	Switzerland (SUI)	0	1	0	1
10	Uzbekistan (UZB)	0	1	0	1
14	Australia (AUS)	0	0	2	2
15	Belgium (BEL)	0	0	1	1
15	Denmark (DEN)	0	0	1	1
15	France (FRA)	0	0	1	1
15	Hungary (HUN)	0	0	1	1
Totals (18 entries)		14	14	14	42

Source: Medal Standings

== Men's events ==
Event	Gold		Silver		Bronze	
Openweight events
JM1x	Greece; Iason Mouselimis	6:50.57	Norway; Raphael Arkadiusz Pintsch	6:53.03	Belgium; Sepp Driesen	6:57.02
JM2x	Estonia; Endrik Hansen; Riko Raimon Kubja	6:18.60	Great Britain; Alfie Webb; Quinn Mosley	6:19.23	Authorised Neutral Athletes; Vladislav Makarov; Kirill Kozitsin	6:19.57
JM4x	Germany; Philipp Prüfer; Jakob Gelsen; Anori Laurin Benz; Christopher Tom Woerden	5:53.52	Poland; Adam Stanski; Tomasz Król; Karol Zywno; Alan Zapałowski	5:53.85	Denmark; Oscar Munck Aabenhus; Andreas Bork Kristensen; Oscar Østergaard Nielsen; Otto Hesseldahl Kjærulf	5:54.14
JM2-	Romania; Radu-Andrei Enescu; Dumitru Cristian Pascari	6:33.46	Greece; Georgios Chiotis; Apostolos Stavros Alexiou	6:34.07	Germany; Jan Kohlbach; Niclas Brell	6:35.40
JM4-	Spain; Borja Nunez Martinez; Robert Privistirescu; Juan Jesus Ortega Fernandez; Manuel Cruz Alcantara	6:00.97	Great Britain; Nicholas Conway; Csombor Hanczar; Edward Ludgate; Guy Parsons	6:02.22	France; Francois Stambach; Mael Khaloua; Gabin Fantino-Apert; Balthazar Mezoughi Auguste	6:03.18
JM8+	Great Britain; Laszlo Earle; George Petrow; Jack Holden; Aiden Hughes; Monty Sutherland; Paul Turner; Jacopo Tan; Jonathan Miles; Nathaniel Barnes (c)	5:33.84	United States; Malcolm Stanton; Patrick Caldwell; Peter Ward; Beckett Kallman; Parker Mansfield; Charles Winder; Ethan Pirigyi; Cole Martin; Jacob Bobrow (c)	5:36.46	Germany; Paul Tamussino; Julius Engelmann; Pepe Jonuscheit; Jakob Große Beilage; Jann Henner De Boer; Lars Berkemeyer; Richard Haack; Max Leon Brueckelmeier; Ella Loetsch (c)	5:37.22

== Women's events ==
Event	Gold		Silver		Bronze	
Openweight events
JW1x	Italy; Alizee Ribolzi	7:34.16	Switzerland; Olivia Leunig	7:40.71	Greece; Paschalina Mouratidou	7:42.53
JW2x	Authorised Neutral Athletes; Tatiana Cherkasova; Anastasiia Burovtseva	6:57.58	Poland; Daria Dolna; Natalia Chodulska	7:00.32	Romania; Gabriela Costine Ursu; Andreea Mariuca Dumitrascu	7:03.79
JW4x	Poland; Marcelina Szkudlarczyk; Zuzanna Królikiewicz; Anna Solarska; Zuzanna Czaja	6:32.58	Czech Republic; Anita Syrůčková; Tea Vetešníková; Diana Lankoci; Terezie Cikánková	6:34.17	Romania; Ioana Gabriela Cristescu; Francesca Iulia Stejar; Sonia Teodora Bital; Daria-Elena Maximiuc	6:35.86
JW2-	Italy; Carolina Cassani; Letizia Martorana	7:10.77	Uzbekistan; Rayhon Sattorova; Aydana Smetullaeva	7:12.90	Australia; Piper Hallam; Emma Peele	7:17.70
JW4-	Romania; Ana-Maria Bordanc; Alexandra Daria Crăciun; Anca-Andreea Culidiuc; Denisa Mihaela Vasilica	6:36.78	Great Britain; Isis Thurnham; Ottilie Campbell-Reide; Henriette Smit; Anna Trapmore	6:39.53	Australia; Oceane Jeannerat; Charlotte Hansen-Knarhoi; Stella Wandel; Olivia Hansen-Knarhoi	6:46.69
JW8+	Romania; Teodora Sandu; Carolina Panuta; Elena Bianca Nitu; Maya Renata Bumbac; Elena Denisa Baciu; Mariana Cașu; Angela Gabriela Cazacu; Mădălina-Dumitrița Ursaciuc; Sarra-Maria Vasca (c)	6:16.02	Germany; Hannah Eckert; Jonna Thiebes; Caitlin Morton; Mathilda Theresa Wendler; Emilia Kreutz; Pia Hagel; Meike Mattheis; Carla Zajonc; Mia-Sophie Walesch (c)	6:18.37	Great Britain; Hannah Palin; Freya Coupe; Florence Grose; Elayna Yap; Mia Tans; Annunciata Ings; Aaliyah Hall; Alice Dargue; Charlie Watkins (c)	6:24.31

== Mixed events ==
Event	Gold		Silver		Bronze	
Openweight events
JMix2x	Germany; Anori Laurin Benz; Kaya Wölk	6:49.47	Italy; Roberta Romani; Elia Bressan	6:50.80	Hungary; Márton Mezősi; Janka Demko	6:50.92
JMix8+	Germany; Maria Pesch; Helena Tibitanzl; Maike Van Beek; Jan Kohlbach; Aron Schaefer; Jan Bornemann; Niclas Brell; Charlotte Paulat; Elias Lukowiak (c)	5:58.52; WCHB	Romania; Anca-Andreea Culidiuc; Jessica Popescu; Razvan Ioan Marin; Andrei Mihai Balan; Radu-Andrei Enescu; Dumitru Cristian Pascari; Marina Ariana Balint; Denisa Mihaela Vasilica; Sarra-Maria Vasca (c)	6:00.61	United States; Lynn Gulli; Tessa Murphy; Olivia Lill; Sophia Rostad; Vrishank Nalla; John Piersma; Elliot Davis; Noah Stephens-Arismendez; Jacob Bobrow (c)	6:02.64

== See also ==
- 2026 World Rowing Championships
