= Sea Forest Waterway =

Rowing venue in Tokyo, Japan

- 海の森水上競技場 (Japanese)
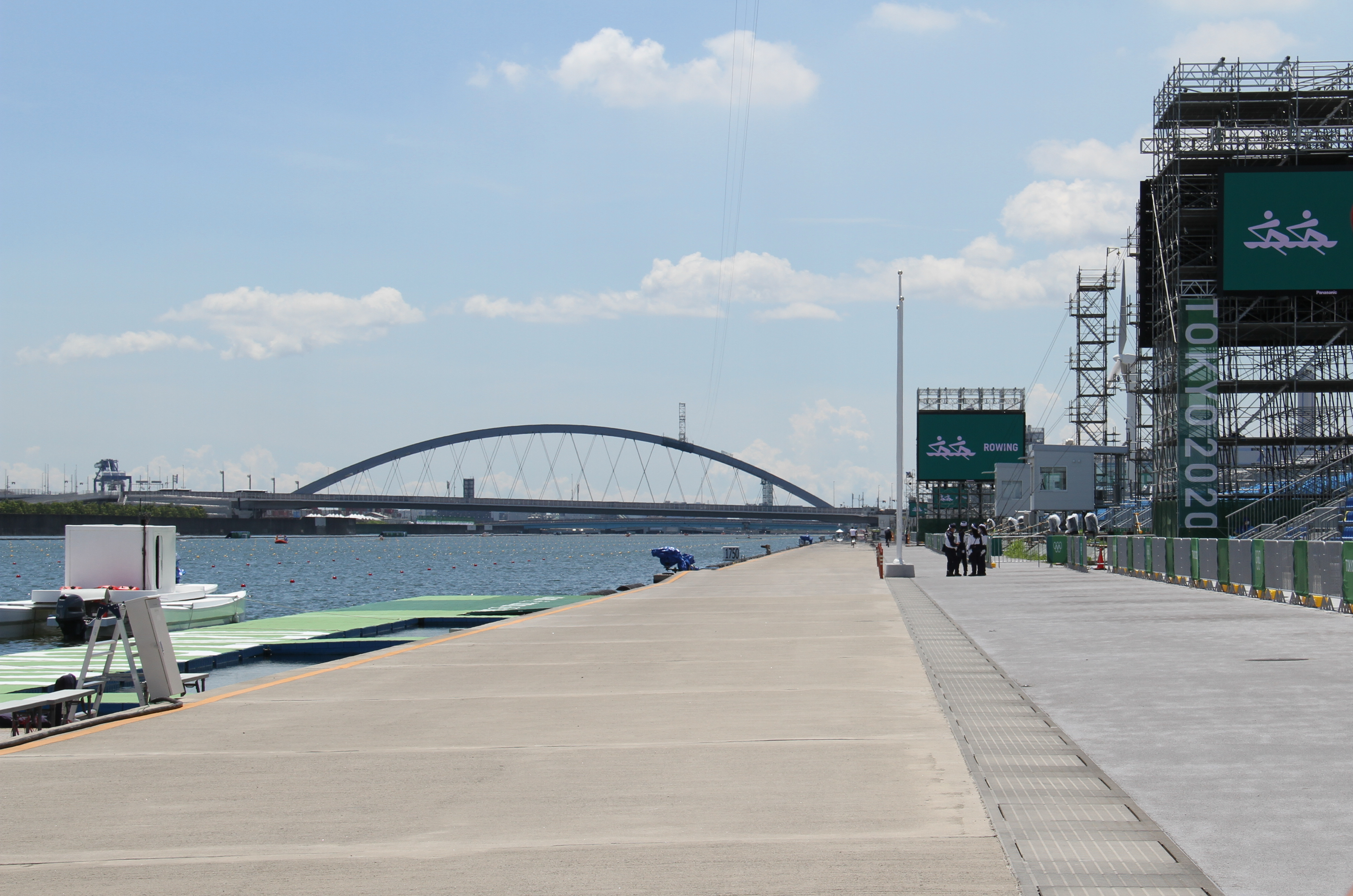
- Sea Forest Waterway in July 2021

- Location within Japan
- Coordinates: 35°36′4″N 139°48′25″E
- Part of: Tokyo Bay
- Built: 2016–2019

The Sea Forest Waterway (Japanese: 海の森水上競技場, Hepburn: Umi no mori suijō kyōgi-jō) is a regatta venue for rowing and canoeing, situated in Kōtō and Ōta, Tokyo Bay, in Japan.

== History ==
The venue was built for the 2020 Summer Olympics and Paralympic Games. Construction began in 2016 and it was inaugurated in June 2019. It was built by Tokyo Metropolitan Government on the waterfront site and is the only rowing venue in Tokyo that meets international standards.

The first international event that was held here were the 2019 World Rowing Junior Championships.

Olympic rowing events are held from 23 to 30 July 2021. The Japan Rowing Association hopes to be able to continue to maintain it after the Olympics.

In January 2021, it was reported that oysters were attaching themselves to the floats used to suppress waves in the venue, resulting in 140 million yen (US$1.3 million) in costs to remove them.

== Location and description ==
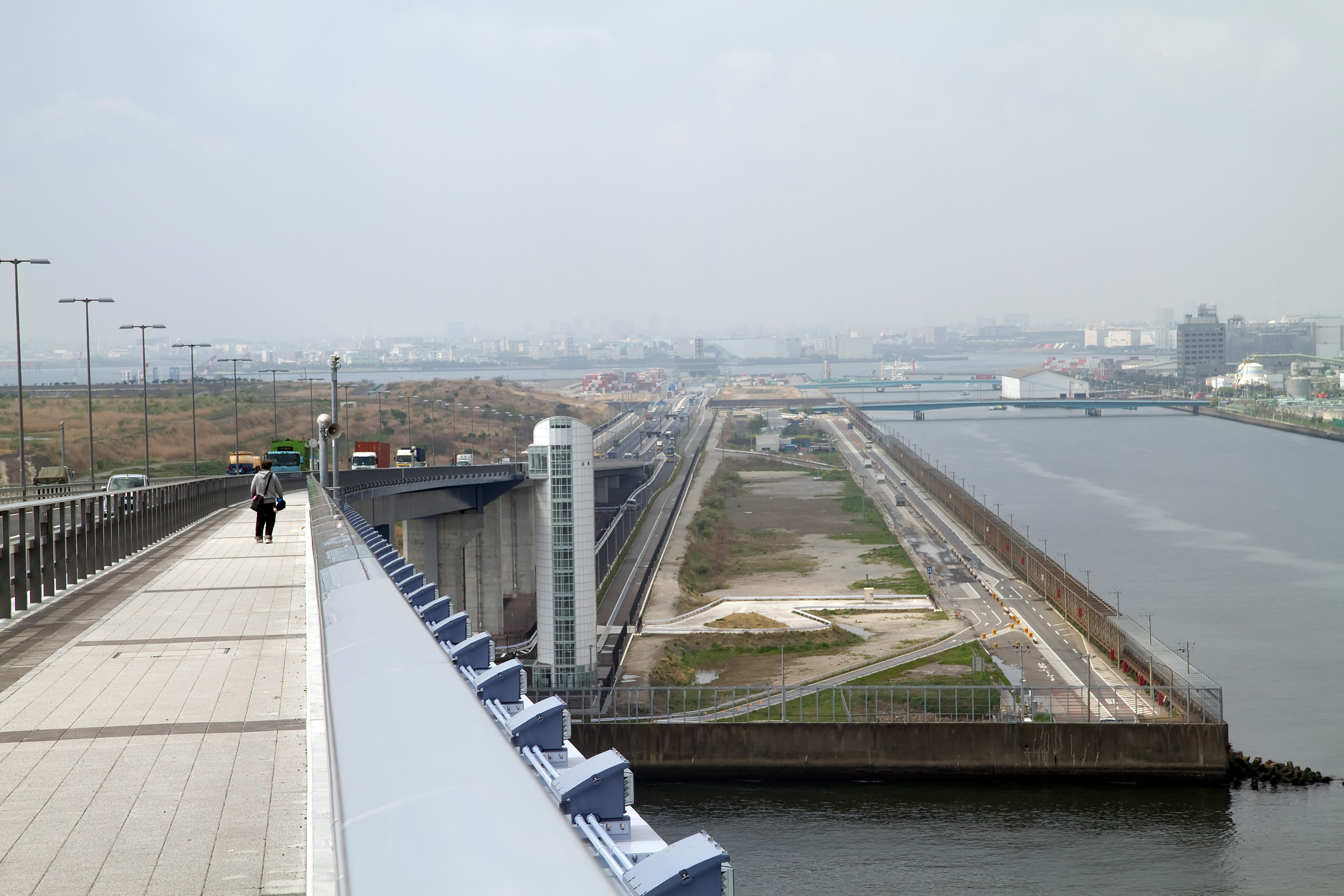
2012 view from Tokyo Gate Bridge of the waterway where the regatta venue was built in 2019

Sea Forest Waterway is located in the special ward of Kōtō. The course is located between two artificial islands, with the buildings associated with the course on Umi no mori. The other island is Reiwajima, which belongs to the Ōta special ward. Tokyo Port Seaside Road is a four-lane highway on Reiwajima, with Tokyo Gate Bridge connecting this road across Tokyo Bay. Tokyo Gate Bridge provides the backdrop to the rowing course looking from start to the finish line. There is no public transport access to the venue, with the nearest rapid transit station—Tokyo Teleport Station that is located on the Rinkai Line—is about 7 kilometres (4.3 mi) away.

The course is separated from Tokyo Bay by dams at each end of the course, which hold the water at a consistent depth of about 6 metres (20 ft). The course is 2,335 metres (7,661 ft) long and 198 metres (650 ft) wide. Each lane is 12.5 metres (41 ft) wide. There are eight lanes. The facility has a 2,000-seat permanent grandstand as well as space for a temporary grandstand for 14,000 more spectators for Olympic events.

The starting pontoons are located immediately adjacent to and north-east of the Chubo-Ohashi Bridge. At the 700-metre-mark (2,300 ft), the Umi no mori Ohashi Bridge goes over the course. Haneda Airport is just to the south from here, with planes flying low over Sea Forest Waterway.
