= 2023 World Rowing Under 19 Championships =

Rowing event

2023 World Rowing Under 19 Championship
- Venue: Vaires-sur-Marne Nautical Stadium
- Location: Paris, France
- Dates: 2–6 August

The 2023 World Rowing Under 19 Championships is the 56th edition of the World Rowing Junior Championships and was held from 2 to 6 August 2023 in Paris, France.

== Men's events ==
Event	Gold		Silver		Bronze	
Openweight events
Single scull (JM1x)	Halil Kaan Köroğlu; Turkey	7:06.42	Panagiotis Makrygiannis; Greece	7:08.62	Peter Strečanský; Slovakia	7:12.87
Double scull (JM2x)	Italy; Josef Giorgio Marvucic, Maichol Brambilla	6:32.49	Greece; Nikolaos Cholopoulos, Dimitrios Papazoglou	6:34.31	Switzerland; Nicolas Chambers, Ivo Löpfe	6:34.70
Quad scull (JM4x)	Germany; Cornelius Conrad, Kjell Richter; Oscar Krause, Lorenz Grimm	5:57.27	Great Britain; Alexander Patton, Nathaniel Gauden, Harry Ruinet, Jack Cadwallader	5:59.61	China; Pan Hang; Xu Wang; Chen Cheng; Heng Xingyu	6:00.99
Coxless pair (JM2-)	Turkey; Aytimur Selçuk; Enes Biber	6:33.83	Germany; Tobias Strangemann; Johannes Benien	6:38.57	South Africa; Myles Laburn; Braden Howard	6:40.05
Coxless four (JM4-)	Romania; Mateus Simion Cozminciuc; Fabrizio Alexandru Scripcariu; Constantin Flocea; Sergiu Anfimov	6:06.24	Germany; Keno Salzmann; Alvar Flöter; Jacob Rastetter; Simon Gimplinger	6:09.96	France; Alexandre Jolard; Alan Mitchell; Maxime Eymard; Hector Guimet	6:11.49
Coxed four (JM4+)	Italy; Natan Sartor; Filippo Bancora; Guglielmo Melegari; Francesco Garruccio; Riccardo Doni	6:21.72	Germany; Leon Gronbach; Sebastian Hopf; Levin Burkhart; Amadeus Maus; Leonard Rieth	6:24.02	Turkey; Erdem Ahmet; Yiğit Yaşar Doğruok; Gökmen Kaan Sezer; Yusuf Ziya Ateş; Selin Boz	6:26.54
Eight (JM8+)	Great Britain; Gabriel George; Frederick Middleton; Robert Rawlinson; Osian James; Alp Karadogan; Jamie Ginsberg; Felix Peerless; Samuel Scowen; Natalia Toms	5:48.43	Germany; Franz Rudolph; Tom Olbrich; Lasse Junge; Leo Fischer; Moritz Müller; Bilal Hamini; Jannes Korthals; Daniel Hopf; Sadeepa Jagoda	5:50.87	Romania; Antonel Avacaritei; Silviu-George Elenes; Stefan Cobzaru; Silviu-Marian Dumitriu; Darius Florin Simion; Sebastian Alexandru Tasca; Constantin Filip; Stefan Bogdan Moales; Alexandru Nedelcu	5:52.21

== Women's events ==
Event	Gold		Silver		Bronze	
Openweight events
JW1x	Bianca Camelia Ifteni; Romania	7:52.33	Holly Davis; Ireland	7:56.40	Cloe Callorda; Uruguay	8:03.46
JW2x	Great Britain; Matilda Drewett; Jessica Weir	7:10.79	Greece; Sofia Dalidou; Gabriela Lioliou	7:12.36	Italy; Giorgia Gregorutti; Melissa Schincariol	7:15.09
JW4x	Germany; Tjorven Stina Schneider; Lena Giesing; Antonia Nake; Lea Hafke	6:45.32	Italy; Matilde Paoletti; Angelica Erpini; Noemi de Vincenzi; Beatrice Ravini Perelli	6:45.67	Great Britain; Eloise Etherington; Olivia Cheesmur; Chloe Sheppard; Lily Martin	6:48.044
JW2-	Romania; Ionela Elena Scutaru; Gabriela Tivodariu	7:26.70	Greece; Christina Papaioannou; Dimitra Papaioannou	7:30.90	Australia; Katie Jackson; Lucy Richardson	7:31.16
JW4-	Italy; Francesca Rubeo; Sara Lucia Caterisano; Lucrezia Monaci; Giorgia Sciattella	6:50.49	Great Britain; Martha Shepherd; Rhiannon Luke; Violet Holbrow-Brooksbank; Madeleine Greenstock	6:50.91	Romania; Ioana Ruxandra Pascovici; Iuliana Isabela Boldea; Delia Mirabela Gradinaciu; Andreea-Nicoleta Dinu	6:51.74
JW4+	United States; Ella Wheeler; Rebecca Stelmach; Delaney Lundberg; Carly Brown; Lucy Herrick	7:07.97	Italy; Giulia Zaffanella; Matilde Orsetti; Giulia Orefice; Marta Orefice; Margherita Fanchi	7:10.00	Not awarded	
JW8+	Great Britain; Ailish Harkin; Aggie Burt; Alice Colclough; Tess Peake; Helena Purves; Niamh Comerford; Emily Myers; Isadora Kennedy; Sophie Wrightson	6:26.00	Germany; Nike Versace; Melina Lindenmuth; Leonie Goller; Leni Kötitz; Sara Grauer; Klara Oenings; Florentina Riffel; Alina Krüger; Emma Lauri Mehner	6:26.09	Romania; Narcisa-Florentina Negură; Adina Alexandra Florea; Rebeca Andreea Andriesei; Bianca Elena Draghici; Beatrice Piseru; Georgiana Blănariu; Andreea Bianca Marin; Denisa Cristina Ailincăi; Irina Lucia Andreea Despa	6:26.14

== Medal table ==
* Host nation (France)

Rank	Nation	Gold	Silver	Bronze	Total
1	Great Britain (GBR)	3	2	1	6
1	Italy (ITA)	3	2	1	6
3	Romania (ROU)	3	0	3	6
4	Germany (GER)	2	5	0	7
5	Turkey (TUR)	2	0	1	3
6	United States (USA)	1	0	0	1
7	Greece (GRE)	0	4	0	4
8	Ireland (IRL)	0	1	0	1
9	Australia (AUS)	0	0	1	1
9	China (CHN)	0	0	1	1
9	France (FRA)*	0	0	1	1
9	Slovakia (SVK)	0	0	1	1
9	South Africa (RSA)	0	0	1	1
9	Switzerland (SUI)	0	0	1	1
9	Uruguay (URU)	0	0	1	1
Totals (15 entries)		14	14	13	41

== See also ==
- 2023 World Rowing Championships
- 2023 World Rowing U23 Championships
