= 2025 World Rowing Under 19 Championships =

Rowing event

2025 World Rowing Under 19 Championship
- Venue: Galvė
- Location: Trakai, Lithuania
- Dates: 6–10 August

The 2025 World Rowing Under 19 Championships is the 58th edition of the World Rowing Junior Championships and was held from 6 to 10 August 2025 in Trakai, Lithuania.

== Medal table ==
* Host nation (Lithuania)

Rank	Nation	Gold	Silver	Bronze	Total
1	Great Britain (GBR)	4	2	1	7
2	Greece (GRE)	2	1	1	4
3	Germany (GER)	2	0	4	6
4	United States (USA)	1	1	0	2
5	Romania (ROU)	1	0	1	2
6	Ireland (IRL)	1	0	0	1
6	Poland (POL)	1	0	0	1
8	Italy (ITA)	0	2	1	3
9	Czech Republic (CZE)	0	2	0	2
9	Uzbekistan (UZB)	0	2	0	2
11	Australia (AUS)	0	1	0	1
11	Spain (ESP)	0	1	0	1
13	Austria (AUT)	0	0	2	2
14	Canada (CAN)	0	0	1	1
14	Switzerland (SUI)	0	0	1	1
Totals (15 entries)		12	12	12	36

== Men's events ==
Event	Gold		Silver		Bronze	
Openweight events
Single scull (JM1x)	Mads Schmied; Germany	7:30.19	Jamalbek Turgunov; Uzbekistan	7:36.21	Paul Schinnerl; Austria	7:37.27
Double scull (JM2x)	Ireland; Jonah Kirby; Jack Rafferty	6:39.57	Greece; Konstantinos Giannoulis; Iason Mouselimis	6:46.83	Germany; Felix Krones; Julius Klein	6:57.37
Quad scull (JM4x)	Germany; Miklas Scheer; Oskar Mueller; Eric Mengebier; Florian Schulze	6:12.23	Italy; Elia Bressan; Pietro Zampaglione; Leonardo Bellomo; Giovanni Paoli	6:15.55	Switzerland; Constantin Feuerstein; Matteo Mueller; Moritz Petry; Gabriel Hars	6:17.42
Coxless pair (JM2-)	Great Britain; Patrick Wild; Alp Karadogan	7:02.22	Australia; Jack Hansen-Knarhoi; Lachlan Brown	7:03.73	Greece; Andreas Bourkas; Alexandros Chatziavgoustidis	7:08.84
Coxless four (JM4-)	Great Britain; Edward Galer; Edward Bayfield; Isaac Dean; Elam Hughes	6:21.19	Italy; Jacopo Cappagli; Romeo Schirinzi; Cesare Borlenghi; Matteo Trevisan	6:25.03	Germany; Nicolai Gablenz; Peer Luis Czorny; Collin Liebe; Jan Lehzen	6:27.11
Eight (JM8+)	Great Britain; Alastair Heathcote; Harry Bernard; Leo Robertson; Richard Wolskel; Gaspard Wenger; Luca Hunt-Davis; Nicholas Conway; Ivo Monaghan; Felix Jamieson	5:57.59	Czech Republic; Antonin Kral; Petr Michalcik; Tadeas Muk; Tomas Bradac; Matous Chynava; Jan Vlastnik; Eduard Tylecek; Vit Truhlar; Marketa Buresova	6:01.10	Germany; Konstantin Wetzler; Georg Rieck; Julius Watzka; Jakob Bergmann; Alex Ian Aderhold; Moritz Bitz; Felix Zeymer; Maximilian Gillmann; Ella Loetsch	6:02.88

== Women's events ==
Event	Gold		Silver		Bronze	
Openweight events
JW1x	Varvara Lykomitrou; Greece	8:25.97	Esther Fuerte Chacon; Spain	8:30.18	Maria Hauser; Austria	8:32.61
JW2x	Greece; Paschalina Mouratidou; Eleni Diavati	7:39.77	Great Britain; Emily Nicholas; Catherine Gardner	7:44.67	Germany; Anna Keller; Greta Amort	7:48.41
JW4x	Poland; Marcelina Szkudlarczyk; Zuzanna Krolikiewicz; Anna Solarska; Zuzanna Czaja	6:56.26	Czech Republic; Anita Syruckova; Terezie Cikankova; Ella Bodisova; Anna Hoskova	6:58.94	Great Britain; Lily Anderson; Charlotte van der Wiele; Lauren Kennedy; Eleanor Lawrence-Preston	6:58.94
JW2-	Romania; Teodora Lehaci; Denisa Mihaela Vasilica	8:02.79	Uzbekistan; Rayhon Sattorova; Aydana Smetullaeva	8:04.74	Canada; Ciana Della Siega; Novella Rusman	8:10.72
JW4-	United States; Teagan Farley; Lia Nathan; Lauren Dubois; Claire van Praagh	7:09.61	Great Britain; Sophie Haisman; Ottilie Campbell-Reide; Chloe Hughes; Amelia Westbrook	7:10.20	Italy; Elisa Marconcini; Matilde Orsetti; Carolina Cassani; Letizia Martorana	7:12.92
JW8+	Great Britain; Charlotte Tong; Ione Haley; Eve Pinsent; Freya Coupe; Charlotte Taylor-Aubery; Elayna Yap; Lucy Pillar; Lara Bone; Hannah Jacobs	6:47.87	United States; Madeline Glover; Caitlin Cecere; Ana Ciechanover; Zara Taylor; Eden Alfi; Alexis Gormley; Kathryn Dahl; Stefania McMasters; Avery Harries-Jones	6:49.50	Romania; Teodora Sandu; Mariana Casu; Ioana Gabriela Cristescu; Angela Gabriela Cazacu; Sava Elena Danci; Madalina-Dumitrita Ursaciuc; Francesca Iulia Stejar; Elena Maria Toma; Stefania- Jakril Baicusi	6:51.05

== See also ==
- 2025 World Rowing Championships
- 2025 World Rowing U23 Championships
