= 2022 European Rowing U19 Championships =

- Venue: Lake Varese
- Location: Varese, Italy
- Dates: 21–22 May 2022

The 2022 European Rowing U19 Championships took place in Varese, Italy, between 21 and 22 May 2022. The age category was renamed from "junior" to "under 19" at the end of 2020, and came into effect at the end of 2021.

== Medalists ==
| Event | Gold | Silver | Bronze |
Men
| Junior men's single sculls (JM1x) | Great Britain; Marcus Chute | Belgium; Boris Taeldeman | France; Pierre Molins |
| Junior men's pair (JM2-) | Serbia (b) Mihajlo Dedić (s) Nemanja Luledžija | Romania (b) Andrei-Vlad-Robert Vatamaniuc (s) Iliuţă-Leontin Nuţescu | Italy (b) Luca Vicino (s) Marco Vicino |
| Junior men's double sculls (JM2x) | Turkey (b) Ahmet Ali Kabadayı (s) Halil Kaan Köroğlu | France (b) Alric Rodrigue (s) Come Gonzalez | Poland (b) Piotr Śliwiński (s) Daniel Gałęza |
| Junior men's four (JM4-) | Romania (b) Cosmin Iulian Plesescu (2) Eduard Angel Moldovan (3) Nicolae Razvan Stoian (s) Marian Stefan Dunca | Italy (b) Guglielmo Melegari (2) Martino Cappagli (3) Emanuele Meliani (s) Giorgio Maddaloni | Serbia (b) Filip Milanović (2) Zoran Bosnić (3) Predrag Cvetković (s) Viktor Popović |
| Junior men's quadruple sculls (JM4x) | Czech Republic (b) Tomáš Panchartek (2) Kryštof Janáč (3) Jakub Sprinzl (s) Ondřej Pecival | Greece (b) Panagiotis Adam (2) Apostolos Lykomitros (3) Nikolaos Cholopoulos (s) Dimitrios Papazoglou | Ukraine (b) Mykhailo Hrabar (2) Oleksandr Ivanov (3) Mykhailo Maiko (s) Danylo Romanenko |
| Junior men's coxed four (JM4+) | Turkey (b) Hamdi Okan Atmaca (2) Fatih Mehmet Avcı (3) Yusuf Ziya Ateş (s) Alper Şevket Eren (c) Tuana Fatma Yıldız | Italy (b) Santo Zaffiro (2) Giulio Zuccala (3) Jacopo Sartori (s) Marco Miatello (c) Lorenzo Fanchi | Hungary (b) Ferenc Szigeti (2) Amir Shah (3) Áron Boros (s) Péter Gasztonyi (c) Dániel Tóth |
| Junior men's eight (JM8+) | Italy (b) Nicolo Gabriele Marelli (2) Alberto Briccola (3) Ferdinando Emanuele Chierchia (4) Davide Salvatore Piovesana (5) Manuel Caldara (6) Antonio Distefano (7) Gregorio Menicagli (s) Francesco Garruccio (c) Leo Vaughan Bozzetta | Ukraine (b) Kyrylo Furs (2) Vladyslav Khrushch (3) Roman Rudenko (4) Roman Pokryshka (5) Yevhen Sotnikov (6) Pavlo Bolotov (7) Mykyta Oliinyk (s) Mark Haidar (c) Pavlo Subit | France (b) Pierre Czerwik (2) Alexis Rose (3) Alexandre Jolard (4) Maxime Eymard (5) Lucas Fauché (6) Pierre-Esteban Soubeste (7) Louis Vigouroux (s) Harry Fisher (c) Lucie Mercier |
Women
| Junior women's single sculls (JW1x) | Greece; Aikaterini Gkogkou | Italy; Aurora Spirito | Switzerland; Lina Kühn |
| Junior women's pair (JW2-) | Greece (b) Ioanna Asvesta (s) Elisavet Ira Argyraki | Italy (b) Sofia Naselli (s) Martina Scarpello | France (b) Léontine Fouquet (s) Jeanne Sellier |
| Junior women's double sculls (JW2x) | Greece (b) Sofia Dalidou (s) Styliani Natsioula | France (b) Milla Massemin (s) Salomé Degeorges | Lithuania (b) Ūla Jonušaitė (s) Saulė Kryževičiūtė |
| Junior women's four (JW4-) | Italy (b) Benedetta Pahor (2) Emma Cuzzocrea (3) Giorgia Sciattella (s) Elisa Grisoni | France (b) Rachel Mazzolini (2) Apoline Dansault (3) Caroline Lagarde (s) Léa Herscovici | Romania (b) Ioana Ruxandra Pascovici (2) Georgiana Blanariu (3) Elena Silvia Mocanu (s) Andreea Ioana Serban |
| Junior women's quadruple sculls (JW4x) | Romania (b) Andreea Todirica (2) Iulia Valentina Nedelcu (3) Delia Mirabela Gradinaciuc (s) Ana-Maria Matran | Poland (b) Kinga Kusiowska (2) Anna Khlibenko (3) Gabriela Stefaniak (s) Natasha Malicka | France (b) Eléa Cloutier (2) Jessica Ravoire (3) Lucie Assier (s) Maëlle Merdens |
| Junior women's eight (JW8+) | Romania (b) Narcisa-Florentina Negura (2) Andreea Petras (3) Cosmina Alexandra Grigore (4) Iuliana Isabela Boldea (5) Beatrice Piseru (6) Denisa Cristina Ailincăi (7) Felicia Maria Mihai (s) Andra Elena Filote (c) Irina Lucia Andreea Despa | Italy (b) Lucrezia Monaci (2) Matilde Paoletti (3) Vittoria Calabrese (4) Alice Pettinari (5) Isabella Bianchi (6) Marta Orefice (7) Giulia Orefice (s) Caterina Monteggia (c) Ilaria Colombo | Ukraine (b) Zinaida Kataieva (2) Alisa Lehenchenko (3) Daria Klievtsova (4) Maryna Demianova (5) Yelyzaveta Nazarenko (6) Anastasiia Draha (7) Viktoriia Pashchenko (s) Iryna Yatsuliak (c) Anastasiia Kozyr |

== Medal table ==
* Host nation (Italy)

| Rank | Nation | Gold | Silver | Bronze | Total |
|---|---|---|---|---|---|
| 1 | Romania | 3 | 1 | 1 | 5 |
| 2 | Greece | 3 | 1 | 0 | 4 |
| 3 | Italy* | 2 | 5 | 1 | 8 |
| 4 | Turkey | 2 | 0 | 0 | 2 |
| 5 | Serbia | 1 | 0 | 1 | 2 |
| 6 | Czech Republic | 1 | 0 | 0 | 1 |
| 6 | Great Britain | 1 | 0 | 0 | 1 |
| 8 | France | 0 | 3 | 4 | 7 |
| 9 | Ukraine | 0 | 1 | 2 | 3 |
| 10 | Poland | 0 | 1 | 1 | 2 |
| 11 | Belgium | 0 | 1 | 0 | 1 |
| 12 | Hungary | 0 | 0 | 1 | 1 |
| 12 | Lithuania | 0 | 0 | 1 | 1 |
| 12 | Switzerland | 0 | 0 | 1 | 1 |
| Totals (14 entries) | | 13 | 13 | 13 | 39 |

== Participants ==
A total of 917 rowers from the national teams of the following 29 countries was registered to compete at 2022 European Rowing U-19 Championships.

- Armenia (2 in 1 event)
- Austria (8 in 3 events)
- Belgium (1 in 1 event)
- Bosnia and Herzegovina (1 in 1 event)
- Bulgaria (5 in 2 events)
- Croatia (17 in 5 events)
- Czech Republic (25 in 6 events)
- Denmark (9 in 4 events)
- Estonia (9 in 3 events)
- France (32 in 9 events)
- Great Britain (5 in 3 events)
- Georgia (2 in 2 events)
- Germany (1 in 1 event)
- Greece (21 in 8 events)
- Hungary (23 in 9 events)
- Italy (49 in 13 events)
- Latvia (4 in 1 event)
- Lithuania (10 in 3 events)
- Moldova (6 in 4 events)
- Norway (3 in 2 events)
- Poland (25 in 6 events)
- Portugal (4 in 1 event)
- Romania (43 in 11 events)
- Slovenia (8 in 4 events)
- Serbia (8 in 3 events)
- Switzerland (21 in 6 events)
- Slovakia (1 in 1 event)
- Turkey (16 in 3 events)
- Ukraine (32 in 6 events)
