= 2018 World Rowing Junior Championships =

- Venue: Labe Aréna Račice
- Location: Račice, Czech Republic
- Dates: 8–12 August

The 52nd World Rowing Junior Championships took place from 8 to 12 August 2018 at the Labe Aréna Račice in Račice, Czech Republic. All rowers are 18 years of age or younger.

== Medal summary ==
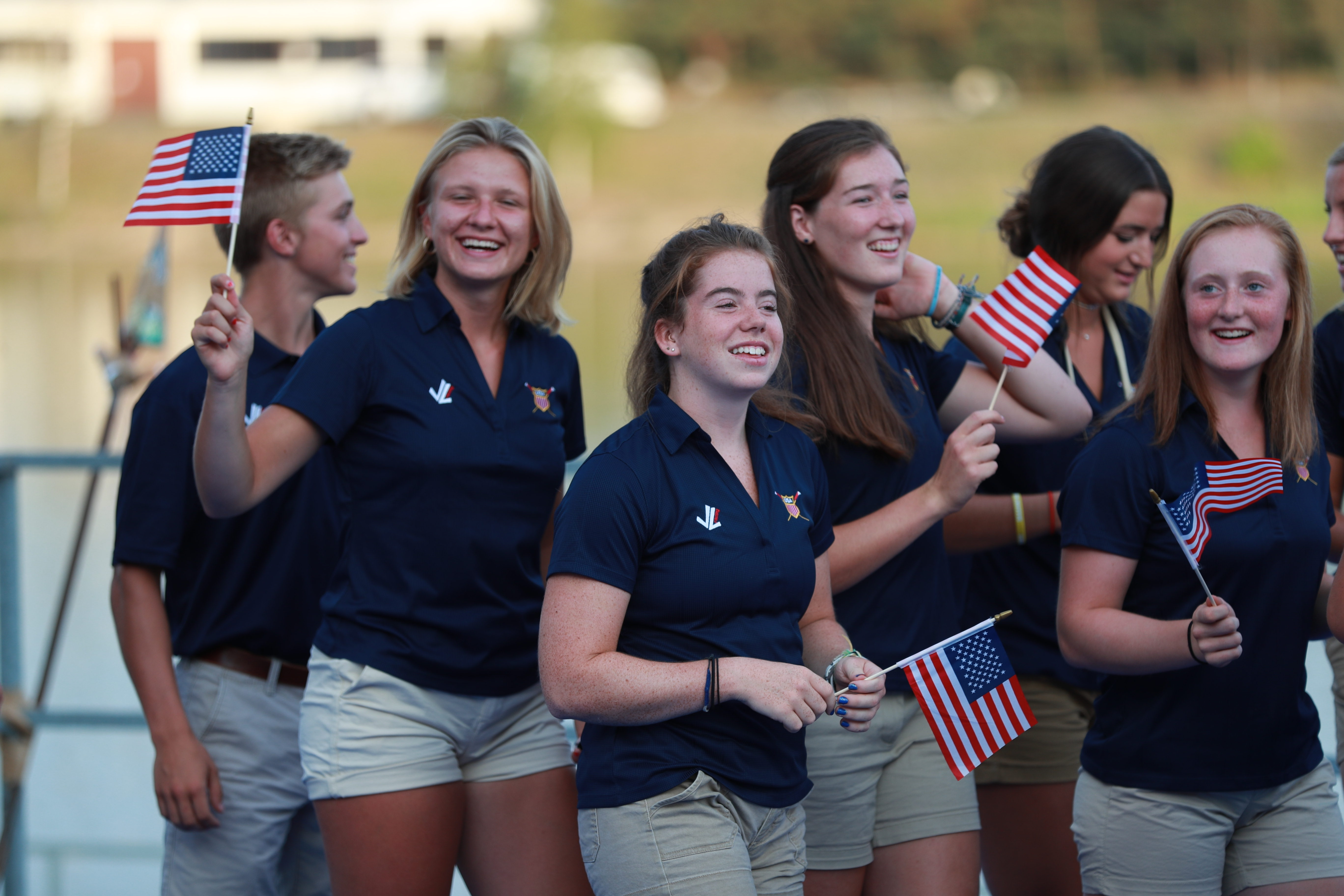
Rowers from the United States

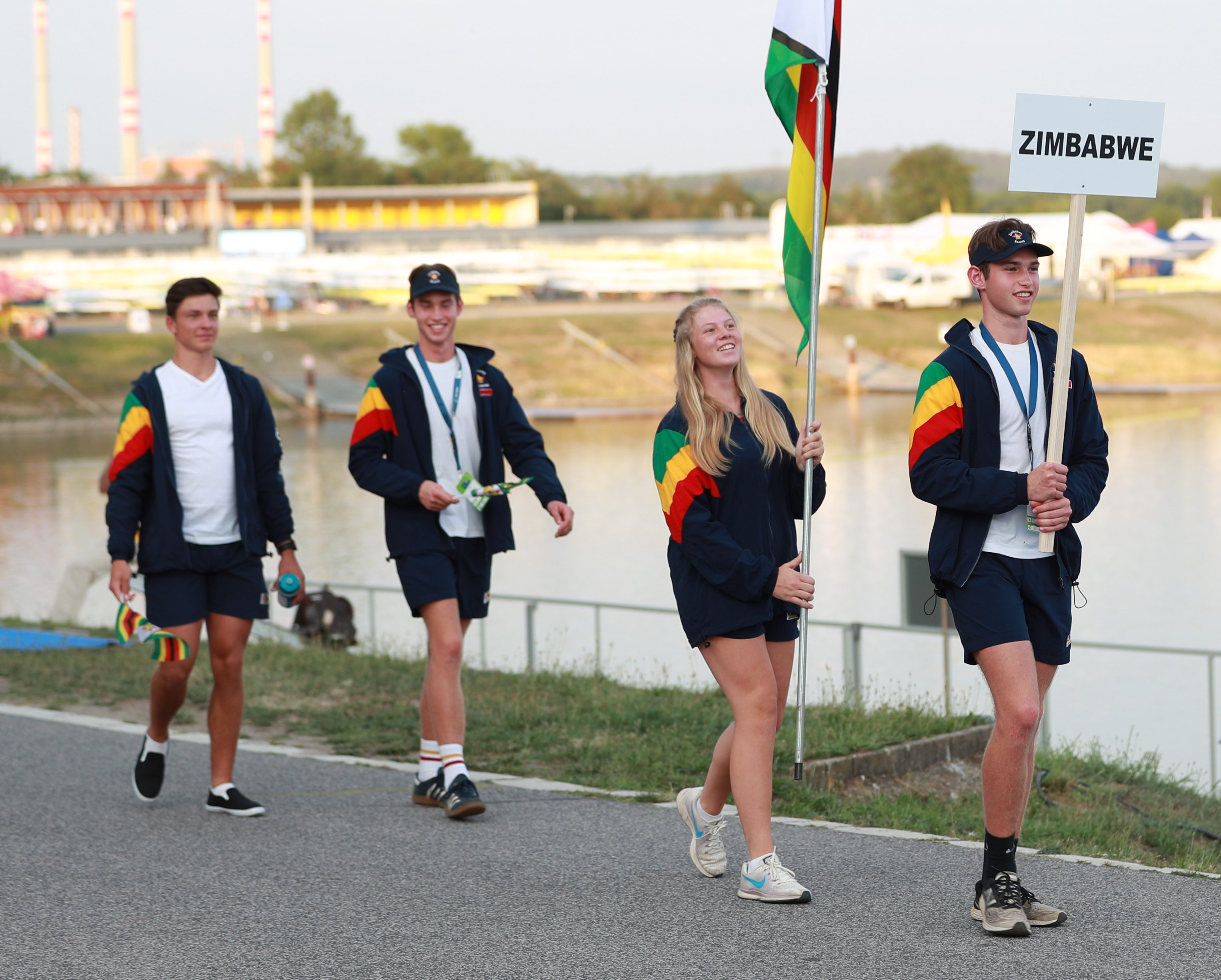
Zimbabwe team

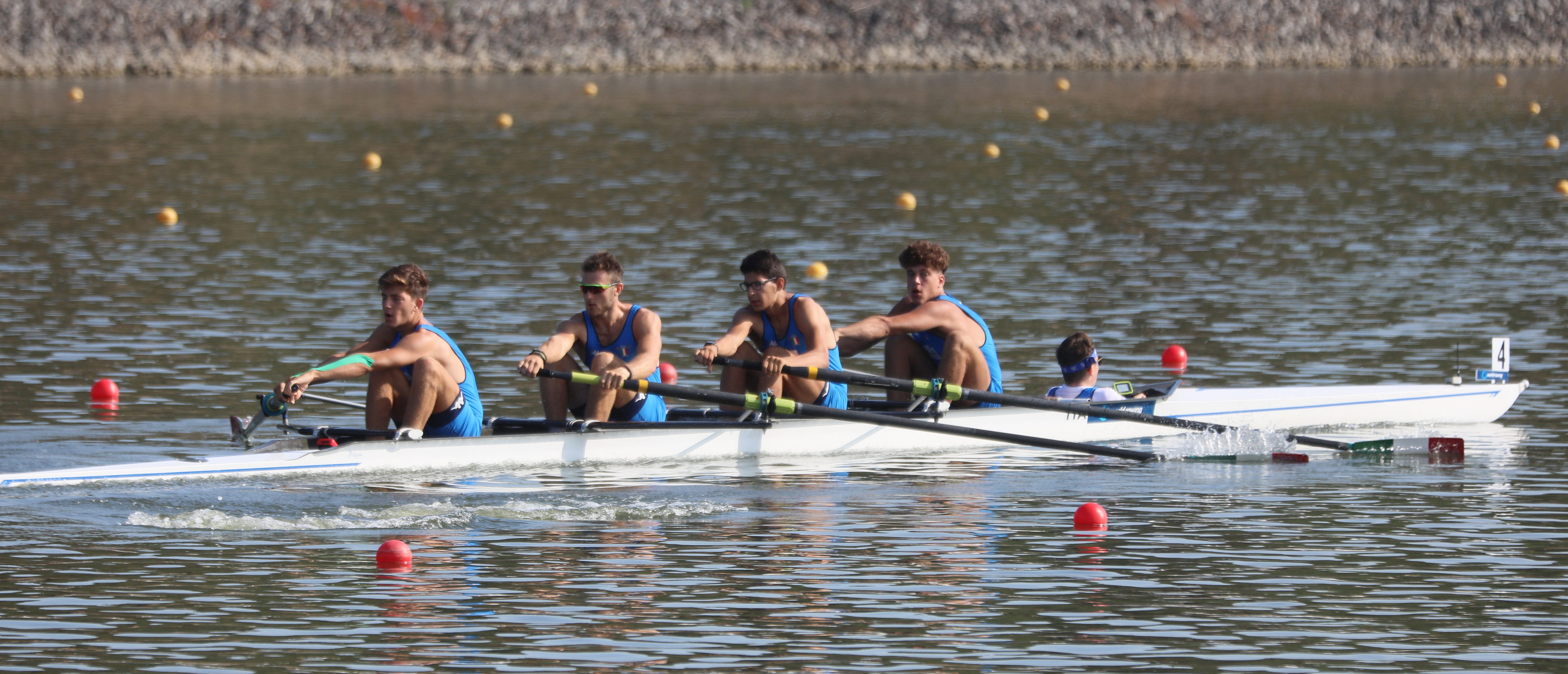
The Italian team (from left Apuzzo, Dini, Verità, Sabbatino and the coxwain Calder), winners in the coxed four.

=== Men's events ===
Event	Gold		Silver		Bronze	
Single scull (JM1x)	Clark Dean (USA)	07:01.37	Cormac Kennedy-Leverett (AUS)	07:05.00	Tristan Vandenbussche (BEL)	07:07.51
Coxless pair (JM2-)	Romania; Alexandru Laurențiu Danciu; Florin Nicolae Arteni-Fîntînariu	06:32.39	Germany; Jasper Angl; Elias Kun	06:32.49	Croatia; Anton Lončarić; Patrik Lončarić	06:37.67
Double scull (JM2x)	Germany; Paul Krüger; Klas Ole Lass	06:26.39	Greece; Grigorios Schizodimos; Petros Gaidatzis	06:29.57	Czech Republic; Jan Vacek; Jakub Kyncl	06:31.67
Coxless four (JM4-)	Great Britain; Douwe de Graaf; Theodore Darlow; Michael Dalton; Calvin Tarczy	05:52.79	New Zealand; Angus Gilbert; Flynn Eliadis-Watson; Campbell Crouch; Elliott Jenkins	05:56.20	Italy; Alessandro Bonamoneta; Achille Benazzo; Alberto Zamariola; Nicolas Castelnovo	05:58.09
Coxed four (JM4+)	Italy; Aniello Sabbatino; Davide Verità; Federico Dini; Leonardo Apuzzo; Alessandro Calder (cox)	06:17.49	United States; Michael Fairley; Henry Bellew; Owen King; Chase Haskell; George Doty	06:19.98	Australia; Isaac Schmidt; Miller Eagle-Rowe; Benjamin Gerrard; Logan Ullrich; Hamish Henriques	06:22.29
Quad scull (JM4x)	Czech Republic; Marek Řehořek; Radim Hladík; Václav Baldrián; Tomáš Šišma	05:51.81	Great Britain; Bryn Ellery; Jake Offiler; Victor Kleshnev; James Cartwright	05:53.21	Germany; Alexander Finger; Paul Berghoff; Merlin Schmid; Aaron Erfanian	05:54.32
Eight (JM8+)	Great Britain; Jake Swann; Thomas Horncastle; George Dickinson; Max Shakespeare; Axel De Boissard; Oliver Parish; Connor Sheridan; Dominic Sullivan; Oscar Olsen	05:37.56	United States; Harrison Schofield; Ryan Beeler; John Ozaeta; Nicholas Fisher; Eli Kalfaian; Dylan White; Harrison Burke; Henry Lowe; Charles Fargo	05:38.34	Germany; Mattes Schönherr; Soeren Henkel; Felix Braband; Patrick Pott; Paul Kirsch; Max Schwartzkopff; Floyd Benedikter; Benjamin Zeisberg; Marvin Paul	05:40.15

=== Women's events ===
Event	Gold		Silver		Bronze	
JW1x	Tabita Maftei (ROU)	07:32.34	Maria Sol Ordas (ARG)	07:33.11	Greta Martinelli (ITA)	07:41.22
JW2-	Greece; Maria Kyridou; Christina Bourmpou	07:17.10	United States; Lucy Koven; Caitlin Esse	07:23.61	Chile; Isidora Niemeyer; Cristina Hostetter Wells	07:26.71
JW2x	China; Zhang Peibing; Liu Ying	07:17.41	Greece; Ismini Noni; Eleni Agioti	07:19.40	New Zealand; Stella Clayton-Greene; Kathryn Glen	07:20.10
JW4-	United States; Julia Braz; Kelsey McGinley; Margaret Hedeman; Catherine Garrett	06:42.81	Italy; Khadija Alajdi El Idrissi; Arianna Passini; Chiara Di Pede; Vittoria Tonoli	06:43.20	New Zealand; Kayla Baker; Grace Watson; Brooke Kilmister; Holly Mills	06:45.03
JW4+	Italy; Beatrice Giuliani; Nadine Agyemang-Heard; Clara Massaria; Lucrezia Baudino; Giulia Clerici (cox)	07:14.19	Australia; Isabelle Furrer; Lauren Graham; Ella Mentzines; Laura Chancellor; Hannah Cowap	07:16.92	United States; Caroline Ricksen; Noelle Amlicke; Kaitlin Knifton; Heidi Jacobson; Julia Abbruzzese	07:17.59
JW4x	Switzerland; Célia Dupré; Emma Kovacs; Jana Nussbaumer; Lisa Loetscher	06:25.82	Germany; Annika Steinle; Klara Thiele; Annabelle Bachmann; Alexandra Foester	06:26.65	Netherlands; Lisa Bruijnincx; Femke Paulis; Fien van Westreenen; Susanna Temming	06:28.62
JW8+	Czech Republic; Marie Stefkova; Zuzana Stepankova; Katerina Pivkova; Barbora Karova; Nikola Kropackova; Lucie Novakova; Barbora Matlova; Valentyna Kolarova; Emma Benyskova	06:27.81	United States; Isabel Mezei; Jessica Mixon; Hannah Schaenman; Samantha Henriksen; Azja Czajkowski; Gabrielle Graves; Alin Pasa; Lena Brown; Francesca Raggi	06:29.62	Romania; Victoria-Stefania Petreanu; Lorena Constantin; Alice-Elena Turcanu; Iuliana Timoc; Laura Pal; Amalia Bucu; Georgiana-Simona Tataru; Gabriela Paraschiv; Alexandra Ungureanu	06:31.19

== Medal table ==
Rank	Nation	Gold	Silver	Bronze	Total
1	United States (USA)	2	4	1	7
2	Italy (ITA)	2	1	2	5
3	Great Britain (GBR)	2	1	0	3
4	Czech Republic (CZE)	2	0	1	3
4	Romania (ROU)	2	0	1	3
6	Germany (GER)	1	2	2	5
7	Greece (GRE)	1	2	0	3
8	China (CHN)	1	0	0	1
8	Switzerland (SUI)	1	0	0	1
10	Australia (AUS)	0	2	1	3
11	New Zealand (NZL)	0	1	2	3
12	Argentina (ARG)	0	1	0	1
13	Belgium (BEL)	0	0	1	1
13	Chile (CHI)	0	0	1	1
13	Croatia (CRO)	0	0	1	1
13	Netherlands (NED)	0	0	1	1
Totals (16 entries)		14	14	14	42

== See also ==
- 2018 World Rowing Championships
- 2018 World Rowing U23 Championships
