= 2019 World Rowing Junior Championships =

- Venue: Sea Forest Waterway
- Location: Odaiba, Tokyo Bay, Japan
- Dates: 7–11 August

The 53rd World Rowing Junior Championships took place from 7 to 11 August 2019 at the Sea Forest Waterway, Odaiba (Tokyo Bay) in Tokyo, Japan. All rowers are 18 years of age or younger.

== Regatta venue ==
The regatta was held at Sea Forest Waterway, the venue constructed for the 2020 Summer Olympic and Paralympic Games in Tokyo. The water is about 6 metres (20 ft) deep. The course is 2,335 metres (7,661 ft) long and 198 metres (650 ft) wide. Each lane is 12.5 m (41 ft) wide. There are 8 lanes.

== Results ==
=== Men ===
Event	Gold		Silver		Bronze	
Single scull (JM1x)	Belarus; Ivan Brynza	7:15.98	Belgium; Tristan Vandenbussche	7:18.92	Switzerland; Tim Roth	7:20.61
Double scull (JM2x)	Australia; Hamish Henriques; Harrison Fox	6:32.81	Germany; Paul Krüger; Aaron Erfanian	6:34.85	Italy; Matteo Sartori; Nicolò Carucci	6:36.62
Quad scull (JM4x)	Germany; Elrond Kullmann; Paul Berghoff; Alexander Finger; Sören Henkel	6:09.96	Italy; Lorenzo Manigrasso; Leonardo Tedoldi; Jacopo Mascitelli; Edoardo Rocchi	6:11.54	Russia; Vladimir Gayevskiy; Viktor Kovalev; Aleksandr Kovalskiy; Egor Grachev	6:13.18
Coxless pair (JM2-)	Romania; Florin Arteni-Fîntînariu; Alexandru Gherasim	6:56.79	Italy; Achille Benazzo; Alessandro Bonamoneta	6:59.64	Germany; Kasper Virnekäs; Tom Tewes	7:00.23
Coxless four (JM4-)	Germany; Mark Hinrichs; Hanno Brach; Bruno Spät; Cedric Wiemer	6:18.25	Great Britain; Oliver Parish; Joseph Middleton; Miles Beeson; Felix Rawlinson	6:19.75	Italy; Alessandro Gardino; Emilio Pappalettera; Giorgio Battigaglia; Simone Fasoli	6:21.08
Coxed four (JM4+)	Germany; Erik Bruns; Frederik Breuer; Tjark Löwa; Ben Gebauer; Julius Fabry (cox)	6:32.41	South Africa; Nathan Fletcher; Brandon Janse van Vuuren; Daton Wolfaardt; Sebastian Prince; Bakang Zondi (cox)	6:32,71	China; Lin Ruida; Liu Wei; Xu Huawei; Zhang Lele; Yang Kun (cox)	6:33.90
Eight (JM8+)	Germany; Leon Knaack; Leon Braatz; Jonas Huth; Jan Szymczak; Julian Garth; Nick Welzenbach; Erik Kohlbach; Ryan Smith; Florian Wünscher (cox)	6:12.10	United States; Jacob Hudgins; Savas Koutsouras; Travis Keating; James Patton; Ian Burnett; John Ozaeta; Gregoire le Meur; Harrison Schofield; Audrey Gates (cox)	6:16.50	Great Britain; Dominic Brown; Cameron Spiers; James Watson-Gandy; Henry Pearson; Maximillan Beekenkamp; Simon Nunayon; Connor Brown; Iwan Hadfield; Benjamin Ray (cox)	6:19.82

=== Women ===
Event	Gold		Silver		Bronze	
Single sculls	Alexandra Föster; Germany	8:31.38	Anastasiia Liubich; Russia	8:38.15	Katelin Gildersleeve; United States	8:41.90
Coxless pair	Czech Republic; Anna Šantrůčková; Eliška Podrazilová	7:42.98	China; Wen Jiayi; Zheng Jiayao	7:48.80	Germany; Stina Röbbecke; Elisa Patzelt	7:52.66
Double sculls	Netherlands; Lisa Bruijnincx; Jacobien van Westreenen	7:25.50	China; Zhang Hairong; Zhang Peibing	7:27.66	Lithuania; Ugnė Juzėnaitė; Dovilė Rimkutė	7:30.23
Coxless four	China; Yu Wen; Chen Jianan; Wang Tingting; Zhang Xuan	7:01.42	Italy; Lucia Rebuffo; Serena Mossi; Nadine Agyemang-Heard; Arianna Passini	7:05.08	Germany; Lena Kolwey; Tori Schwerin; Maike Böttcher; Noreen Junges	7:06.71
Coxed four	Italy; Bianca Saffirio; Beatrice Giuliani; Lucrezia Baudino; Clara Massaria; Giulia Clerici	7:19.80	China; Lin Meixuan; Dai Lulu; Zhou Ziquan; Pan Zhinuo; Cai Jiyao	7:21.78	Germany; Marit Runge; Luisa Gathman; Magdalena Rabl; Lisa Weber; Annalena Fisch	7:24.74
Quadruple sculls	New Zealand; Eva Hofmans; Rebecca Leigh; Shakira Mirfin; Phoebe Trolove	6:54.32	Germany; Johanna Sinkewitz; Luise Bachmann; Charlotte Moritz; Sarah Wibberenz	6:56.71	Romania; Patricia Cireș; Andrada-Maria Moroşanu; Gabriela Paraschiv; Cosmina-Maria Podaru	6:58.76
Eight	China; Wang Xiao; Xu Yixi; Li Xia; Li Qian; Wang Yanrong; Zhang Peixin; Sun Mingxia; Yang Rongrong; Song Jiayi	6:35.34	Germany; Clara Oberdorfer; Klara Kerstan; Kristin Wagner; Svea Pichner; Lene Mührs; Olivia Clotten; Emma Kögler; Mathilda Kitzmann; Janne-Marit Börger	6:35.93	Italy; Bianca Saffirio; Serena Mossi; Lucia Rebuffo; Beatrice Giuliani; Lucrezia Baudino; Clara Massaria; Nadine Agyemang-Heard; Arianna Passini; Giulia Clerici	6:37.49

== Medal table ==
* Host nation (Japan)

Rank	Nation	Gold	Silver	Bronze	Total
1	Germany	5	3	4	12
2	China	2	3	1	6
3	Italy	1	3	3	7
4	Romania	1	0	1	2
5	Australia	1	0	0	1
5	Belarus	1	0	0	1
5	Czech Republic	1	0	0	1
5	Netherlands	1	0	0	1
5	New Zealand	1	0	0	1
10	Great Britain	0	1	1	2
10	Russia	0	1	1	2
10	United States	0	1	1	2
13	Belgium	0	1	0	1
13	South Africa	0	1	0	1
15	Lithuania	0	0	1	1
15	Switzerland	0	0	1	1
Totals (16 entries)		14	14	14	42
