= Jake Offiler =

English rower

Jake Offiler is a London born rower who, as part of the United Kingdom team, won silver in the 2018 World Rowing Junior Championships. He is also a member of Globe RC. Earlier in the 2017-18 season he was part of the Great Britain team that attended the 2018 European Rowing Junior Championships in Gravelines, France. There he won a gold medal in the double sculls, making him and his partner Great Britain's first Junior European Champions.
