= 2018 European Rowing Junior Championships =

- Venue: Le Parc des Rives de l'Aa
- Location: Gravelines, France
- Dates: 26–27 May 2018
- Competitors: 470 from 34 nations

The 2018 European Rowing Junior Championships took place in Gravelines, France, between 26 and 27 May 2018.

== Medal summary ==
=== Men ===
Event	Gold	Time	Silver	Time	Bronze	Time
JM1x	Moritz Wolff (GER)	7:21.74	Ivan Brynza (BLR)	7:26.34	Gabriel Mahler (CZE)	7:26.40
JM2-	Croatia (CRO); Patrik Lončarić; Anton Lončarić	7:10.04	Romania (ROU); Florin Arteni-Fintinariu; Iulian Nestian	7:11.55	Italy (ITA); Simone Fasoli; Davide Comini	7:15.01
JM2x	Great Britain (GBR); Jake Offiler; James Cartwright	6:50.95	Italy (ITA); Filippo Graziano; Nicolò Carucci	6:51.23	Belarus (BLR); Yahor Shliupski; Uladzislau Lokun	6:51.46
JM4-	Italy (ITA); Alberto Zamariola; Achille Benazzo; Alessandro Bonamoneta; Nicolas Castelnovo	6:38.26	Romania (ROU); Gheorghe Morar; Denis Nichitean; Andrei Lungu; Alexandru-Laurenţiu Danciu	6:42.16	Serbia (SRB); Marko Đuranović; Kosta Petković; Pavle Lijeskić; Veljko Matić	6:45.72
JM4x	Czech Republic (CZE); Václav Baldrián; Tomáš Šišma; Radim Hladík; Marek Řehořek	6:31.50	Romania (ROU); Sebastian-Constantin Cirstea; Cosmin Carpea; Dumitru-Valentin Bucur; Dorin Simion	6:33.25	France (FRA); Jean-Pierre Izart; Téva Mellier; Hugues Larchevêque; Romain Harat	6:33.67
JM4+	Italy (ITA); Aniello Sabbatino; Davide Verità; Federico Dini; Leonardo Apuzzo; Alessandro Calder	6:20.99	Russia (RUS); Sergrei Korneiasov; Kirill Kalganov; Yury Serov; Denis Verbenko; Ilia Popov	6:24.63	Ukraine (UKR); Viacheslav Suhlob; Vladyslav Shmaldii; Danyyil Yegorov; Yevhenii Chumak; Denys Dziubynskyi	6:28.35
JM8+	Russia (RUS); Pavel Bakhaev; Aleksandr Serbeniuk; Aleksandr Martynenko; Danil Liashchuk; Lev Zakharov; Alexey Lopatin; Oleg Dudko; Ivan Kladov; Ilia Popov	6:09.63	Italy (ITA); Yuri Zerboni; Edoardo Rimoldi; Filippo Sardella; Gabriele Colombo; Volodymyr Kuflyk; Ivan Galimberti; Matteo Panceri; Roberto Gerosa; Emanuele Capponi	6:11.99	France (FRA); Marc Mouton-Didier; Clément Navarre; Timothée Guérinot; Brieuc Huck; Mathis Nottelet; Arnaud Buard; Victor El Kholti; Thomas Bolle; Guilhem De Clerck	6:12.27

=== Women ===
Event	Gold	Time	Silver	Time	Bronze	Time
JW1x	Esther Briz (ESP)	7:41.64	Greta Martinelli (ITA)	7:45.63	Jana Nussbaumer (SUI)	7:45.95
JW2-	Greece (GRE); Maria Kyridou; Christina Bourmpou	7:54.08	Romania (ROU); Tabita Maftei; Alina-Maria Baletchi	7:57.98	Lithuania (LTU); Vytautė Urbonaitė; Kamilė Kralikaitė	8:05.90
JW2x	France (FRA); Clara Valinducq; Lucine Ahyi	7:34.21	Italy (ITA); Ilaria Corazza; Maria Ludovica Costa	7:35.19	Russia (RUS); Viktoriia Luganskaya; Olga Inozemtseva	7:40.56
JW4-	Romania (ROU); Cristina Druga; Laura Pal; Alexandra Ungureanu; Geanina-Dumitrita Giuncanariu	7:23.99	Italy (ITA); Clara Massaria; Vittoria Tonoli; Khadija Alajdi El Idrissi; Chiara Di Pede	7:25.54	Denmark (DEN); Mathilde Kiilgaard; Matilde Hjorth; Marie Ramm; Emma Olesen	7:29.49
JW4x	Czech Republic (CZE); Josefína Lázničková; Anna Šantrůčková; Michala Pospíšilová; Eliška Podrazilová	7:09.99	Switzerland (SUI); Lisa Lötscher; Olivia Negrinotti; Emma Kovacs; Célia Dupré	7:13.40	Romania (ROU); Georgiana-Simona Tataru; Adriana Surupaceanu; Gabriela Paraschiv; Nicoleta Mustea	7:23.34
JW4+	Ukraine (UKR); Svitlana Skrobalo; Viktoriia Nahorna; Kateryna Ustiuzhanina; Anastasiia Ustiuzhanina; Yana Ocheretiana	7:08.64	France (FRA); Eva Bastian; Noémie Aubert; Leire Urreizti; Marie Pachebat; Agathe Angonin	7:13.39	none awarded	
JW8+	Czech Republic (CZE); Barbora Podrazilová; Valentýna Kolářová; Ellen Michaeli; Emma Benýšková; Kateřina Pivková; Nikola Kropáčková; Barbora Kárová; Marie Štefková; Lucie Nováková	6:54.38	Romania (ROU); Amalia Bucu; Cristina Raileanu; Lorena Constantin; Georgiana Morosanu; Elena-Catalina Onciu; Teodora Mandrila; Alice-Elena Turcanu; Iuliana Timoc; Victoria-Stefania Petreanu	6:56.49	Belarus (BLR); Inesa Sys; Volha Zgurskaya; Veranika Hulevich; Alesia Dubrouskaya; Yauheniya Kulbitskaya; Yuliya Kruhlikava; Valeryia Paperyna; Anhelina Lyskouskaya; Marharyta Nikalaichyk	7:01.08

=== Medal table ===
Rank	Nation	Gold	Silver	Bronze	Total
1	Czech Republic (CZE)	3	0	1	4
2	Italy (ITA)	2	5	1	8
3	Romania (ROU)	1	5	1	7
4	France (FRA)	1	1	2	4
5	Russia (RUS)	1	1	1	3
6	Ukraine (UKR)	1	0	1	2
7	Croatia (CRO)	1	0	0	1
7	Germany (GER)	1	0	0	1
7	Great Britain (GBR)	1	0	0	1
7	Greece (GRE)	1	0	0	1
7	Spain (ESP)	1	0	0	1
12	Belarus (BLR)	0	1	2	3
13	Switzerland (SUI)	0	1	1	2
14	Denmark (DEN)	0	0	1	1
14	Lithuania (LTU)	0	0	1	1
14	Serbia (SRB)	0	0	1	1
Totals (16 entries)		14	14	13	41
