= 2017 World Rowing Junior Championships =

- Venue: Trakai Rowing Centre
- Location: Trakai, Lithuania
- Dates: 2–6 August

The 51st World Rowing Junior Championships were held from 2 to 6 August 2017 at the Trakai Rowing Centre in Trakai, Lithuania. All rowers are age 18 or younger in this competition.

== Medal summary ==
=== Men's events ===
Event	Gold		Silver		Bronze	
Single scull (JM1x)	United States; Clark Dean	07:04.73	Germany; Moritz Wolff	07:07.98	South Africa; Mmbudzeni Masutha	07:11.10
Coxless pair (JM2-)	Croatia; Patrik Lončarić; Anton Lončarić	06:51.11	Romania; Ștefan Constantin Berariu; Florin Sorin Lehaci	06:54.50	Turkey; Aydın İnanç Şahin; İsmail Ali Bekiroğlu	06:58.90
Double scull (JM2x)	Australia; Cormac Kennedy-Leverett; Fergus Hamilton	06:34.05	Belarus; Artsem Laputsin; Yauheni Zalaty	06:37.07	Greece; Christos Steryiakas; Charalampos Dinenas	06:40.86
Coxless four (JM4-)	Great Britain; Douwe de Graaf; Casper Woods; Calvin Tarczy; Felix Drinkall	06:15.43	New Zealand; Daniel Hunter Williamson; Thomas Russel; Matthew Macdonald; Benjamin Taylor	06:17.12	Romania; Dumitru-Alexandru Ciobica; Nicu-Iulian Chelaru; Cristian-Ionut Cojocaru; Ciprian Huc	06:22.80
Coxed four (JM4+)	Italy; Federico Dini; Aniello Sabbatino; Aniello Di Ruocco; Leonardo Apuzzo; Riccardo Zoppini	06:33.71	Switzerland; Nils Schneider; Anton Flohr; Oliver Gisiger; Nico Müller; Nicolas Mamassis	06:36.91	Germany; Elias Kun; Henry Hopmann; Jasper Angl; Oliver Peikert; Elisa Carnetto	06:37.95
Quad scull (JM4x)	Switzerland; Valentin Huehn; Dominic Condrau; Andrin Gulich; Linus Copes	06:04.97	Great Britain; Victor Kleshnev; Ollie Costley; Bryn Ellery; Tom Smith	06:06.06	Italy; Danilo Amalfitano; Gabriele D'Alfonsi; Nunzio Di Colandrea; Leonardo Radice Karoschitz	06:06.23
Eight (JM8+)	Germany; Tobias Dirschauer; Mika Marinus Kohout; Leon Münch; Patrick Pott; Ole Kruse; Mattes Schönherr; John Heithoff; Yannik Sacherer; Max Schwartzkopff	05:49.13	United States; Spencer Brennessel Beaumont; Chase Barrows; Nolan Parks; Harrison Burke; Gordon Holterman; Nikita Lilichenko; Christian Tabash; Geoffrey Dettlinger; Sydney Edwards	05:50.10	Great Britain; Luke Robinson; Tom Worthington; Henry Blois-Brooke; Tobias Schroder; Patrick Adams; Seb Newman; Henry Jones; Matthew Rowe; Axel De Boissard	05:50.26

=== Women's events ===
Event	Gold		Silver		Bronze	
JW1x	Spain; Esther Briz Zamorano	07:58.72	South Africa; Megan Hancock	07:59.70	France; Margaux Bailleul	08:02.54
JW2-	Romania; Adriana Ailincai; Maria Tivodariu	07:35.83	Greece; Margarita Georgoudi; Christina Bourmpou	07:38.79	Germany; Katja Fuhrmann; Marie-Sophie Zeidler	07:40.95
JW2x	Great Britain; Holly Dunford; Zoe Adamson	07:10.13	Germany; Maren Voelz; Nora Peuser	07:11.32	Canada; Grace Vandenbroek; Kieanna Stephens	07:15.51
JW4-	Croatia; Ivana Jurkovic; Josipa Jurkovic; Bruna Milinovic; Izabela Krakic	06:57.75	Romania; Ioana-Irina Acsinte; Geanina-Dumitrita Juncanariu; Elena-Catalina Onciu; Alina-Maria Baletchi	07:00.87	United States; Kelsey Mcginley; Gwenyth Lynch; Rose Carr; Kaitlyn Kynast	07:04.60
JW4x	Romania; Larisa Elena Rosu; Andreea Grapinoiu; Simona Geanina Radiș; Tabita Maftei	06:46.27	Germany; Annabelle Bachmann; Sophie Leupold; Tabea Kuhnert; Leonie Menzel	06:46.72	Switzerland; Jana Nussbaumer; Lisa Loetscher; Emma Kovacs; Eline Rol	06:50.99
JW8+	Czech Republic; Linda Skalova; Marie Stefkova; Katerina Hartmanova; Anna-Marie Mackova; Zuzana Metlicka; Veronika Kiacova; Josefina Laznickova; Valentyna Kolarova; Sofie Sumanova	06:27.97	Germany; Hannah Reif; Katharina Stamer; Annabel Oertel; Katarina Tkachenko; Lena Sarassa; Patricia Schwarzhuber; Inke Buse; Leonie Heuer; Neele Erdtmann	06:28.40	Romania; Elena Danut; Elena-Cosmina Ciritel; Monica-Georgiana Andron; Ioana-Madalina Morosan; Andreea Popa; Raluca-Georgiana Dinulescu; Maria-Magdalena Rusu; Vasilica-Alexandra Rusu; Victoria-Stefania Petreanu	06:30.27

== Medal table ==
Rank	Nation	Gold	Silver	Bronze	Total
1	Romania (ROU)	2	2	2	6
2	Great Britain (GBR)	2	1	1	4
3	Croatia (CRO)	2	0	0	2
4	Germany (GER)	1	4	2	7
5	Switzerland (SUI)	1	1	1	3
5	United States (USA)	1	1	1	3
7	Italy (ITA)	1	0	1	2
8	Australia (AUS)	1	0	0	1
8	Czech Republic (CZE)	1	0	0	1
8	Spain (ESP)	1	0	0	1
11	Greece (GRE)	0	1	1	2
11	South Africa (RSA)	0	1	1	2
13	Belarus (BLR)	0	1	0	1
13	New Zealand (NZL)	0	1	0	1
15	Canada (CAN)	0	0	1	1
15	France (FRA)	0	0	1	1
15	Turkey (TUR)	0	0	1	1
Totals (17 entries)		13	13	13	39

== See also ==
- 2017 World Rowing Championships
- 2017 World Rowing U23 Championships
