= Heffen =

- Village
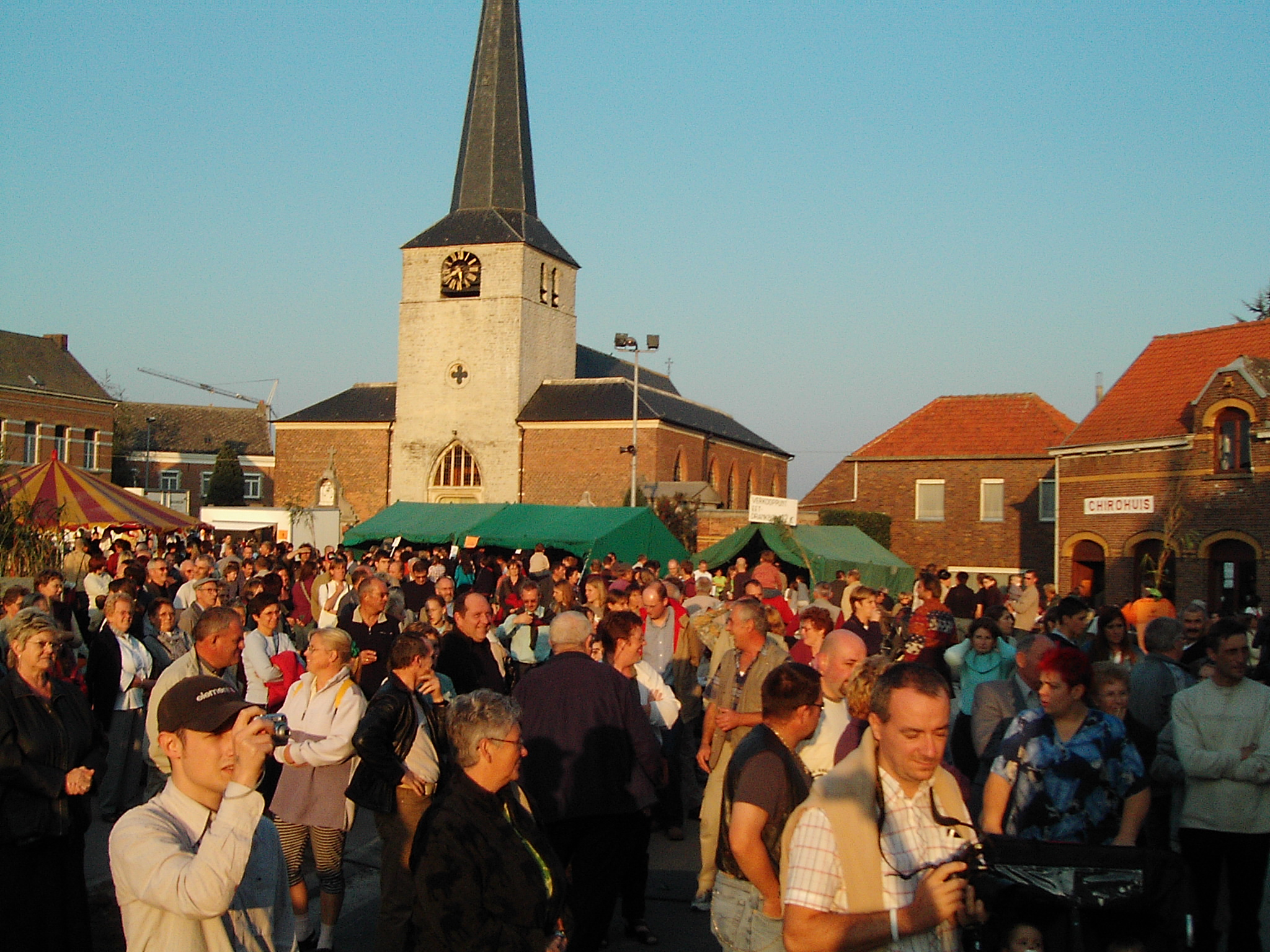
- Heffen during pumpkin day

- Location in Belgium
- Coordinates: 51°02′N 04°25′E
- Country: Belgium
- Region: Flemish Region
- Province: Antwerp
- Municipality: Mechelen

Area
  - Total: 6.98 km^{2} (2.69 sq mi)

Population (2021)
  - Total: 2,160
  - Density: 309/km^{2} (801/sq mi)
- Time zone: CET

Heffen is a village and deelgemeente in the municipality of Mechelen in the Belgian province of Antwerp.

== Geography ==
Heffen occupies 6,95 km² and houses 2122 residents (1 january 2007). The village is located to the north-west of Mechelen at the river Zenne. Heffen was added to the municipality of Mechelen in 1976.

== Places of interest ==
- The parish church, devoted to Our Lady of Perpetual Help, dates back to the 14th century. Its baroque spire from 1755 was destroyed by lightning in 1865. Its octagonal spire from 1866 was demolished in 1899 and replaced by the current spire. The church and its surrounding churchyard are protected as a monument and a landscape.
- The townhouse dating back to 1877.

== Demographics ==
=== Evolution of the population ===
==== 19th century ====
Year	1806	1816	1830	1846	1856	1866	1876	1880	1890
Population	815	800	920	952	933	902	969	1014	1109
Comment: result of census at 31/12

==== 20th century to 1976 municipal reform ====
Year	1900	1910	1920	1930	1947	1961	1970	1976
Population	1095	1224	1303	1341	1482	1615	1702	1669
Comment: results of census at 31/12 up until 1970 + 31/12/1976

==== Recent census results ====
	Absolute numbers			Percentage		
Year	1997	2001	2004	1997	2001	2004
Total	1930	2021	2110	2,56	2,67	2,74
Youth (<25j)	657	653	674	34,04	32,31	31,94
