= Centro Universitario Sportivo Italiano =

Italian university sports club

- Abbreviation: CUSI
- Founded: 1946
- Affiliation: Italian National Olympic Committee
- Location: Rome
- President: Lorenzo Lentini

Official website
- www.cusi.it
- (Italy)

The Centro Universitario Sportivo Italiano (CUSI), (English: Italian University Sports Centre) is an association that promotes sports activity at the university level, and is recognized by the Italian National Olympic Committee.

It is headquartered in Rome, Via Angelo Brofferio 7. The current president is Lorenzo Lentini.

== Committees for university sports ==
Most Italian universities have a CUS (Comitato per lo sport Universitario). As of September 2017, there were 48 such committees.

== Activity ==
Every year since 1947, when the first event was held in Bologna, the CUSI organizes the Campionati Nazionali Universitari (National University Championships).

== See also ==
- International University Sports Federation
