= European Rowing U19 Championships =

Continental rowing event

- Status: Active
- Genre: Sports event
- Date: Varies
- Frequency: Annual
- Location: Europe
- Inaugurated: 2011
- Organiser: World Rowing Federation

The European Rowing U19 Championships (formerly known as the European Rowing Junior Championships) is an international rowing regatta organized by the World Rowing Federation. It is a two-to-three-day-long event for rowers under 19 years old at the end of the calendar year in which the event takes place. The age category was renamed from "junior" to "under 19" at the end of 2020, and this change came into effect at the end of 2021.

== History ==
Although the World Rowing Federation states that the inaugural championships took place in 2008, the first event took place in 2011. European Member National Federations are eligible to compete.

== Editions ==
| # | Year | Host city | Host country | Dates | Nations | Events | Ref |
|---|---|---|---|---|---|---|---|
| 1 | 2011 | Kruszwica | Poland | 24–26 June | | | |
| 2 | 2012 | Bled | Slovenia | 8–10 June | | 13 | |
| 3 | 2013 | Minsk | Belarus | 24–26 May | | 13 | |
| 4 | 2014 | Heindonk | Belgium | 24–25 May | 31 | 13 | |
| 5 | 2015 | Račice | Czech Republic | 23–24 May | 31 | 13 | |
| 6 | 2016 | Trakai | Lithuania | 9–10 July | | 13 | |
| 7 | 2017 | Krefeld | Germany | 20–21 May | 32 | 13 | |
| 8 | 2018 | Gravelines | France | 26–27 May | 34 | 14 | |
| 9 | 2019 | Essen | Germany | 18–19 May | 34 | 14 | |
| 10 | 2020 | Belgrade | Serbia | 26–27 September | 27 | 14 | |
| 11 | 2021 | Oberschleißheim | Germany | 9–10 October | 27 | 14 | |
| 12 | 2022 | Varese | Italy | 21–22 May | 29 | 14 | |
| 13 | 2023 | Brive-la-Gaillarde | France | 20–21 May | 26 | 14 | |
| 14 | 2024 | Kruszwica | Poland | 1–2 June | 25 | 14 | |
| 15 | 2025 | Kruszwica | Poland | 24–25 May | 27 | 14 | |
| 16 | 2026 | Brandenburg an der Havel | Germany | 23–24 May | 32 | 14 | |

== Results ==
- https://www.kwgoplokruszwica.pl/me2011/wyniki/indexang.htm
- https://www.the-sports.org/rowing-european-junior-championships-2012-medals-epa38041.html
- https://www.the-sports.org/rowing-european-junior-championships-2013-medals-epa39729.html
- https://www.the-sports.org/rowing-european-junior-championships-2014-medals-epa56510.html
- https://www.the-sports.org/rowing-european-junior-championships-2015-medals-epa60606.html
- https://www.the-sports.org/rowing-european-junior-championships-2016-medals-epa64016.html
- https://www.the-sports.org/rowing-european-junior-championships-2017-medals-epa74775.html
- https://www.the-sports.org/rowing-european-junior-championships-2018-medals-epa87243.html
- https://www.the-sports.org/rowing-european-junior-championships-2019-medals-epa87244.html
- https://www.the-sports.org/rowing-european-junior-championships-2020-medals-epa106088.html
- https://www.the-sports.org/rowing-european-junior-championships-2021-medals-epa110886.html
- https://www.the-sports.org/rowing-european-junior-championships-2022-medals-epa110889.html
- https://www.the-sports.org/rowing-european-junior-championships-2023-medals-epa110895.html
- https://www.the-sports.org/rowing-european-junior-championships-2024-medals-epa110901.html

== See also ==
- Coupe de la Jeunesse
- European Rowing U23 Championships
- European Rowing Championships
- World Rowing Junior Championships
