= Heindonk =

- Village
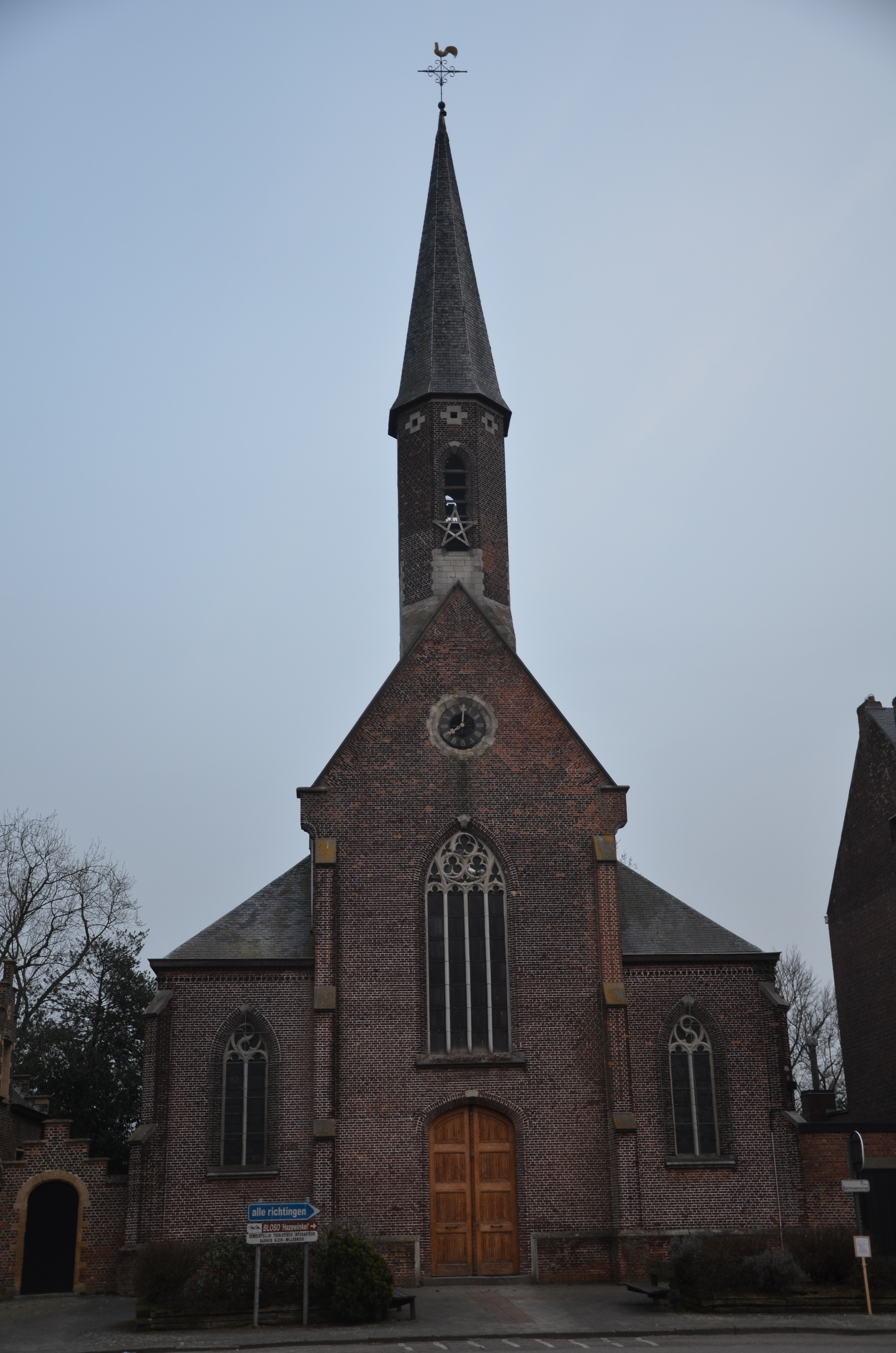
- Saint John the Baptist and Saint Amandus Church

- Location in Belgium
- Coordinates: 51°04′00″N 04°24′25″E
- Country: Belgium
- Region: Flemish Region
- Province: Antwerp
- Municipality: Willebroek

Area
  - Total: 3.68 km^{2} (1.42 sq mi)
- Elevation: 4 m (13 ft)

Population (2021)
  - Total: 700
  - Density: 190/km^{2} (490/sq mi)
- Time zone: UTC+1 (Central European Time Zone)
  - Summer (DST): UTC+2 (Central European Summer Time)
- Postal code: 2830
- Area code: 03
- ISO 3166 code: BE

Heindonk is a Belgian village in the municipality of Willebroek in the province of Antwerp in Belgium. It is situated northwest of the city of Mechelen.

== History ==
Historically the village was a part of the parish of Zemst. In 1603, it became part of Heffen. In 1803, the village became an independent municipality. In 1977, the municipality was merged into Willebroek.

== Overview ==
In Heindonk is the Hazewinkel, a 2,000 m rowing and regatta course, where many World Championships Rowing took place. Apart from the Hazewinkel Heindonk is surrounded by water and nature. The rivers Zenne coming from Brussels, Dyle coming from Louvain, Nete coming from Lier and the channel Louvain-Dyle all come together north of Heindonk, forming the river Rupel.

A surf-lake called 'De Bocht', is near a small castle called De Bocht, which means 'the curve', because it is next to the Rupel where the river makes a curve between the towns Terhagen and Rumst on the other side of the river. At the side of Heindonk this curve creates a creek, called the 'Potpolder'. Next to The Hazewinkel there is 'Het Broek', a 675ha nature reserve situated in Heindonk and neighbouring villages Blaasveld and Heffen.

Situated in the metropolitan area between Brussels and Antwerp it is remote due to its enclosement by the rivers, rowing- and surflakes and nature reserve.
