= World Rowing U19 Championships =

International junior rowing event

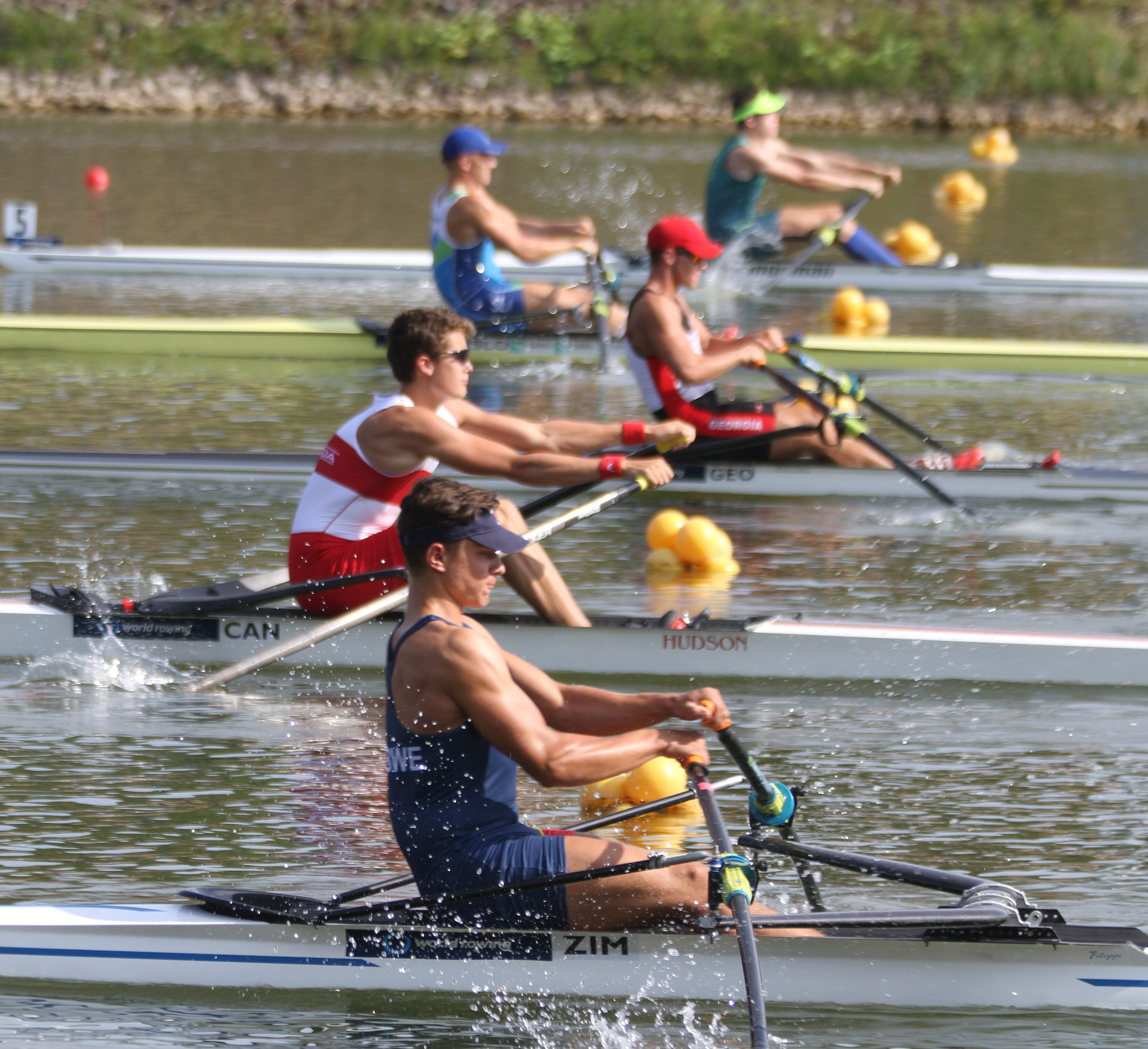
World Rowing Junior Championships

The World Rowing U19 Championships, former name World Rowing Junior Championships is an international rowing regatta organized by FISA (the International Rowing Federation). A rower or coxswain shall be classified as a Junior until 31 December of the year in which he reaches the age of 18. After that date, he shall be classified as an Under 23 rower. During Olympic years it is held at the same location as the Senior World Rowing Championships.

The first FISA Youth Regatta was held in 1967 and has been held every year since then, being raised to the status of FISA Junior Champs in 1970 and Junior World Champs in 1985.

Many European countries send athletes not up to the standard for World Championships to the Coupe de la Jeunesse.

== Venues ==
Year	Dates	Host city	No. of events	1st place	2nd place	3rd place
1967	29–30 July	(West Germany) Ratzeburg	7	Italy	West Germany	Yugoslavia
1968	2–4 August	(Netherlands) Amsterdam	7	East Germany	Netherlands	United States
1969	6–10 August	(Italy) Naples	7	West Germany	Czechoslovakia	France
1970	5–8 August	Ioannina	7	East Germany	West Germany	Italy
1971	28–31 July	(Socialist Federal Republic of Yugoslavia) Bled	7	East Germany	Soviet Union	West Germany
1972	2–5 August	(Italy) Milan	7	East Germany	West Germany	Soviet Union
1973	1–4 August	(United Kingdom) Nottingham	7	East Germany	West Germany	Soviet Union
1974	1–4 August	(West Germany) Ratzeburg	8	East Germany	West Germany	Italy
1975	6–10 August	(Canada) Montreal	8	East Germany	Soviet Union	West Germany
1976	11–14 August	(Austria) Villach	8	East Germany	Soviet Union	West Germany
1977	4–7 August	(Finland) Tampere	8	East Germany	West Germany	Poland
1978	29–30 July	(Socialist Federal Republic of Yugoslavia) Belgrade	14	East Germany	Soviet Union	Czechoslovakia
1979	14–18 August	(Soviet Union) Moscow	14	Soviet Union	East Germany	Bulgaria
1980	13–17 August	(Belgium) Heindonk	14	East Germany	Soviet Union	Bulgaria
1981	4–8 August	Sofia	14	East Germany	Romania	Soviet Union
1982	4–8 August	(Italy) Piediluco	14	East Germany	Soviet Union	West Germany
1983	3–7 August	(France) Vichy	14	East Germany	Soviet Union	Bulgaria
1984	18–21 July	(Sweden) Jönköping	14	East Germany	Soviet Union	France
1985	7–11 August	(East Germany) Brandenburg an der Havel	14	East Germany	Romania	Soviet Union
1986	30 July – 3 August	(Czechoslovakia) Račice	14	East Germany	Soviet Union	Italy
1987	5–9 August	(West Germany) Cologne	14	East Germany	Soviet Union	Italy
1988	3–7 August	(Italy) Milan	14	East Germany	Soviet Union	Italy
1989	1–6 August	(Hungary) Szeged	14	East Germany	Soviet Union	Yugoslavia
1990	1–5 August	(France) Aiguebelette-le-Lac	14	East Germany	Soviet Union	Italy
1991	1–4 August	(Spain) Banyoles	14	Germany	Czechoslovakia	Soviet Union
1992	12–15 August	(Canada) Montreal	14	Germany	Czechoslovakia	Australia
1993	4–8 August	(Norway) Ås	14	Germany	Australia	Norway
1994	6–15 August	(Germany) Oberschleißheim	14	Germany	Romania	Switzerland
1995	1–5 August	(Poland) Poznań	14	Germany	Australia	Denmark
1996	5–11 August	(United Kingdom) Glasgow	14	Germany	Romania	Australia
1997	6–10 August	(Belgium) Heindonk	14	Germany	Romania	Australia
1998	4–8 August	(Austria) Ottensheim	14	Germany	Romania	Australia
1999	5–8 August	(Bulgaria) Plovdiv	14	Germany	Romania	Great Britain
2000	2–5 August	(Croatia) Zagreb	14	Germany	Italy	Belarus
2001	8–11 August	(Germany) Duisburg	14	Romania	France	Germany
2002	7–10 August	(Lithuania) Trakai	14	Italy	Romania	Australia
2003	6–9 August	(Greece) Athens	14	Italy	Australia	Romania
2004	27–31 July	(Spain) Banyoles	14	Romania	Ukraine	Germany
2005	3–6 August	(Germany) Brandenburg an der Havel	14	Germany	Romania	Italy
2006	2–5 August	(Netherlands) Amsterdam	14	Germany	Romania	New Zealand
2007	8–11 August	(China) Beijing	13	China	Germany	Romania
2008	22–28 July	(Austria) Ottensheim	13	Germany	New Zealand	United States
2009	5–8 August	(France) Brive-la-Gaillarde	13	Germany	Australia	Great Britain; Romania
2010	5–8 August	(Czech Republic) Račice	13	Germany	Romania	Greece; United States
2011	3–7 August	(United Kingdom) Dorney	13	Germany	Romania	Italy
2012	15–19 August	(Bulgaria) Plovdiv	13	Italy	Romania	Germany
2013	7–11 August	(Lithuania) Trakai	13	Germany	Romania	Italy
2014	6–10 August	(Germany) Hamburg	13	Germany	Romania	China
2015	5–8 August	(Brazil) Rio de Janeiro	13	Germany	Italy	Netherlands
2016	23–28 August	(Netherlands) Rotterdam	13	Italy	Germany	Czech Republic
2017	2–6 August	(Lithuania) Trakai	13	Romania	Great Britain	Croatia
2018	8–12 August	(Czech Republic) Račice	13	United States	Italy	Great Britain
2019	7–11 August	(Japan) Tokyo	14	Germany	China	Italy
2020	16–23 August	(Slovenia) Bled	cancelled			
2021	11–15 August	(Bulgaria) Plovdiv	14	United States	Germany	Romania
2022	27–31 July	(Italy) Varese	14	Greece	Italy	Germany
2023	2–6 August	(France) Paris	14	Great Britain; Italy	–	Romania
2024	18–25 August	(Canada) St. Catharines	14	Romania	Italy	Greece
2025	6–10 August	(Lithuania) Trakai	12	Great Britain	Greece	Germany
2026	6–9 August	(Bulgaria) Plovdiv	14	Romania Germany	–	Italy

== Medal table ==
As of 2025.

Rank	Nation	Gold	Silver	Bronze	Total
1	East Germany	146	53	17	216
2	Germany	142	107	73	322
3	Romania	74	42	42	158
4	Italy	49	71	58	178
5	Soviet Union	42	61	48	151
6	Great Britain	30	45	34	109
7	Australia	27	23	27	77
8	United States	24	32	33	89
9	West Germany	18	41	41	100
10	China	15	8	16	39
11	Czech Republic	13	8	10	31
12	France	12	35	32	79
13	Greece	12	22	16	50
14	Bulgaria	11	14	21	46
15	Netherlands	9	4	19	32
16	Russia	8	15	15	38
17	Czechoslovakia	8	11	20	39
18	Poland	8	11	19	38
19	Switzerland	8	7	11	26
20	New Zealand	7	11	14	32
21	Slovenia	7	7	7	21
22	Belarus	6	13	6	25
23	Yugoslavia	6	12	6	24
24	Lithuania	5	3	3	11
25	Denmark	4	8	10	22
26	Serbia	4	2	4	10
27	Spain	3	8	10	21
28	Croatia	3	7	8	18
29	Estonia	3	2	1	6
30	Canada	2	3	16	21
31	Ukraine	2	3	8	13
32	Latvia	2	3	6	11
33	Norway	2	2	6	10
34	Turkey	2	2	4	8
35	Ireland	1	2	1	4
36	Argentina	1	1	0	2
37	Portugal	1	0	0	1
38	Austria	0	8	9	17
39	South Africa	0	5	5	10
40	Belgium	0	3	5	8
41	Hungary	0	2	9	11
42	Sweden	0	2	2	4
43	Chile	0	2	1	3
44	Uzbekistan	0	2	0	2
–	Individual Neutral Athletes	0	1	1	2
45	Slovakia	0	0	2	2
46	Brazil	0	0	1	1
46	Finland	0	0	1	1
46	Uruguay	0	0	1	1
Totals (48 entries)		717	724	699	2,140
