= 2023 World Rowing Championships – Women's coxless pair =

Women's coxless pair at the 2023 World Rowing Championships
- Venue: Lake Sava
- Location: Belgrade, Serbia
- Dates: 4 September – 9 September
- Competitors: 44 from 22 nations
- Winning time: 7:20.52

Medalists
gold medal	Ymkje Clevering; Veronique Meester	Netherlands
silver medal	Jessica Morrison; Annabelle McIntyre	Australia
bronze medal	Ioana Vrînceanu; Roxana Anghel	Romania

The women's coxless pair competition at the 2023 World Rowing Championships took place at Lake Sava, in Belgrade.

== Schedule ==
The schedule was as follows:

Date	Time	Round
Monday 4 September 2023	09:42	Heats
Tuesday 5 September 2023	11:26	Repechages
Thursday 7 September 2023	09:35	Semifinals A/B
Thursday 7 September 2023	16:35	Semifinals C/D
Saturday 9 September 2023	09:30	Final D
Saturday 9 September 2023	09:58	Final C
Saturday 9 September 2023	11:10	Final B
Saturday 9 September 2023	13:34	Final A

All times are Central European Summer Time (UTC+2)

== Results ==
=== Heats ===
The fastest boats in each heat advanced directly to the AB semifinals. The remaining boats were sent to the repechages.

==== Heat 1 ====
Rank	Rower	Country	Time	Notes
1	Ioana Vrînceanu; Roxana Anghel	Romania	7:11.47	SA/B
2	Aina Cid; Esther Briz Zamorano	Spain	7:15.77	R
3	Radka Novotniková; Pavlina Flamiková	Czech Republic	7:19.53	R
4	Kate Haines; Alana Sherman	New Zealand	7:19.71	R
5	Nicole Martinez; Alejandra Alonso	Paraguay	7:25.98	R
6	Wang Tingting; Zhang Xuan	China	7:28.41	R

==== Heat 2 ====
Rank	Rower	Country	Time	Notes
1	Melita Abraham; Antonia Abraham	Chile	7:12.97	SA/B
2	Alison Rusher; Meghan Musnicki	United States	7:13.39	R
3	Evangelia Anastasiadou; Christina Bourmpou	Greece	7:13.84	R
4	Lena Sarassa; Hannah Reif	Germany	7:24.33	R
5	Ina Nikulina; Kseniya Zalataya	Individual Neutral Athletes	7:27.93	R
6	Emma Cornelis; Agathe Oudet	France	7:28.26	R

==== Heat 3 ====
Rank	Rower	Country	Time	Notes
1	Ymkje Clevering; Veronique Meester	Netherlands	7:12.19	SA/B
2	Aifric Keogh; Fiona Murtagh	Ireland	7:17.14	R
3	Emily Ford; Esme Booth	Great Britain	7:21.93	R
4	Hedvig Rasmussen; Fie Udby Erichsen	Denmark	7:28.22	R
5	Caileigh Filmer; Maya Meschkuleit	Canada	7:32.83	R

==== Heat 4 ====
Rank	Rower	Country	Time	Notes
1	Jessica Morrison; Annabelle McIntyre	Australia	7:11.83	SA/B
2	Kamilė Kralikaitė; Ieva Adomavičiūtė	Lithuania	7:19.69	R
3	Alice Codato; Aisha Rocek	Italy	7:24.37	R
4	Martyna Jankowska; Barbara Jechorek	Poland	7:38.59	R
5	Ivana Jurković; Josipa Jurković	Croatia	7:45.55	R

=== Repechages ===
The two fastest boats in each repechage advanced to the AB semifinals. The remaining boats were sent to the CD semifinals.

==== Repechage 1 ====
Rank	Rower	Country	Time	Notes
1	Evangelia Anastasiadou; Christina Bourmpou	Greece	7:03.32	SA/B
2	Aina Cid; Esther Briz Zamorano	Spain	7:04.09	SA/B
3	Hedvig Rasmussen; Fie Udby Erichsen	Denmark	7:05.42	SC/D
4	Wang Tingting; Zhang Xuan	China	7:19.79	SC/D
	Ivana Jurković; Josipa Jurković	Croatia	DNS	

==== Repechage 2 ====
Rank	Rower	Country	Time	Notes
1	Alison Rusher; Meghan Musnicki	United States	7:06.88	SA/B
2	Emily Ford; Esme Booth	Great Britain	7:10.12	SA/B
3	Nicole Martinez; Alejandra Alonso	Paraguay	7:15.24	SC/D
4	Emma Cornelis; Agathe Oudet	France	7:16.01	SC/D
5	Martyna Jankowska; Barbara Jechorek	Poland	7:24.15	SC/D

==== Repechage 3 ====
Rank	Rower	Country	Time	Notes
1	Aifric Keogh; Fiona Murtagh	Ireland	7:03.13	SA/B
2	Alice Codato; Aisha Rocek	Italy	7:07.93	SA/B
3	Kate Haines; Alana Sherman	New Zealand	7:09.78	SC/D
4	Ina Nikulina; Kseniya Zalataya	Individual Neutral Athletes	7:14.39	SC/D

==== Repechage 4 ====
Rank	Rower	Country	Time	Notes
1	Kamilė Kralikaitė; Ieva Adomavičiūtė	Lithuania	7:09.46	SA/B
2	Radka Novotniková; Pavlina Flamiková	Czech Republic	7:12.91	SA/B
3	Caileigh Filmer; Maya Meschkuleit	Canada	7:19.97	SC/D
4	Lena Sarassa; Hannah Reif	Germany	7:23.38	SC/D

=== Semifinals C/D ===
The three fastest boats in each semifinal advanced to the C final. The remaining boats were sent to the D final.

==== Semifinal 1 ====
Rank	Rower	Country	Time	Notes
1	Ina Nikulina; Kseniya Zalataya	Individual Neutral Athletes	7:46.94	FC
2	Caileigh Filmer; Maya Meschkuleit	Canada	7:49.13	FC
3	Karen Mortensen; Fie Udby Erichsen	Denmark	7:50.58	FC
4	Joséphine Cornut-Danjou; Agathe Oudet	France	7:59.44	FD

==== Semifinal 2 ====
Rank	Rower	Country	Time	Notes
1	Nicole Martinez; Alejandra Alonso	Paraguay	7:40.68	FC
2	Kate Haines; Alana Sherman	New Zealand	7:42.51	FC
3	Lena Sarassa; Hannah Reif	Germany	7:47.08	FC
4	Wang Tingting; Zhang Xuan	China	7:50.67	FD
5	Martyna Jankowska; Barbara Jechorek	Poland	8:05.18	FD

=== Semifinals A/B ===
The three fastest boats in each semifinal advanced to the A final. The remaining boats were sent to the B final.

==== Semifinal 1 ====
Rank	Rower	Country	Time	Notes
1	Ioana Vrînceanu; Roxana Anghel	Romania	7:38.69	FA
2	Aifric Keogh; Fiona Murtagh	Ireland	7:43.69	FA
3	Melita Abraham; Antonia Abraham	Chile	7:47.50	FA
4	Kamilė Kralikaitė; Ieva Adomavičiūtė	Lithuania	7:51.93	FB
5	Aina Cid; Esther Briz Zamorano	Spain	7:54.30	FB
6	Emily Ford; Esme Booth	Great Britain	8:00.63	FB

==== Semifinal 2 ====
Rank	Rower	Country	Time	Notes
1	Jessica Morrison; Annabelle McIntyre	Australia	7:32.30	FA
2	Ymkje Clevering; Veronique Meester	Netherlands	7:33.17	FA
3	Alison Rusher; Meghan Musnicki	United States	7:46.87	FA
4	Evangelia Anastasiadou; Christina Bourmpou	Greece	7:53.49	FB
5	Radka Novotniková; Pavlina Flamiková	Czech Republic	7:59.74	FB
6	Alice Codato; Aisha Rocek	Italy	8:05.80	FB

=== Finals ===
The A final determined the rankings for places 1 to 6. Additional rankings were determined in the other finals.

==== Final D ====
Rank	Rower	Country	Time	Total rank
1	Emma Cornelis; Agathe Oudet	France	7:16.29	19
2	Wang Tingting; Zhang Xuan	China	7:18.80	20
3	Martyna Jankowska; Barbara Jechorek	Poland	7:22.58	21

==== Final C ====
Rank	Rower	Country	Time	Total rank
1	Kate Haines; Alana Sherman	New Zealand	7:07.18	13
2	Lena Sarassa; Hannah Reif	Germany	7:11.28	14
3	Nicole Martinez; Alejandra Alonso	Paraguay	7:12.34	15
4	Karen Mortensen; Fie Udby Erichsen	Denmark	7:13.10	16
5	Ina Nikulina; Kseniya Zalataya	Individual Neutral Athletes	7:13.64	17
6	Caileigh Filmer; Maya Meschkuleit	Canada	7:15.96	18

==== Final B ====
Rank	Rower	Country	Time	Total rank
1	Evangelia Anastasiadou; Christina Bourmpou	Greece	7:11.94	7
2	Aina Cid; Esther Briz Zamorano	Spain	7:12.32	8
3	Emily Ford; Esme Booth	Great Britain	7:16.76	9
4	Kamilė Kralikaitė; Ieva Adomavičiūtė	Lithuania	7:17.33	10
5	Radka Novotniková; Pavlina Flamiková	Czech Republic	7:17.38	11
6	Alice Codato; Aisha Rocek	Italy	7:23.85	12

==== Final A ====
Rank	Rower	Country	Time
1st place, gold medalist(s)	Ymkje Clevering; Veronique Meester	Netherlands	7:20.52
2nd place, silver medalist(s)	Jessica Morrison; Annabelle McIntyre	Australia	7:22.90
3rd place, bronze medalist(s)	Ioana Vrînceanu; Roxana Anghel	Romania	7:24.33
4	Aifric Keogh; Fiona Murtagh	Ireland	7:28.99
5	Melita Abraham; Antonia Abraham	Chile	7:34.39
6	Alison Rusher; Meghan Musnicki	United States	7:34.43
