= Rowing at the 2024 Summer Olympics – Women's coxless pair =

Women's coxless pair at the Games of the XXXIII Olympiad
- Olympic rowing
- Venue: Stade nautique de Vaires-sur-Marne, National Olympic Nautical Stadium of Île-de-France, Vaires-sur-Marne
- Dates: 28 July – 2 August 2024
- Competitors: 26 from 13 nations

Medalists
1st place, gold medalist(s)		Ymkje Clevering; Veronique Meester	Netherlands
2nd place, silver medalist(s)		Ioana Vrînceanu; Roxana Anghel	Romania
3rd place, bronze medalist(s)		Jessica Morrison; Annabelle McIntyre	Australia

The women's coxless pair event at the 2024 Summer Olympics took place from 28 July to 2 August 2024 at the Stade nautique de Vaires-sur-Marne, National Olympic Nautical Stadium of Île-de-France in Vaires-sur-Marne. 26 rowers from 13 nations competed.

== Background ==
This will be the 13th appearance of the event, which has been held at every Summer Olympics since 1976.

== Qualification ==
Each National Olympic Committee (NOC) has been limited to a single boat (one rower) in the event since 1976.

== Competition format ==
This rowing event is a coxless pair event, meaning that each boat is propelled by two rowers. The "coxless" portion means that there is no coxswain. Each rower has one oar. The course uses the 2000 metres distance that became the Olympic standard in 1912.

During the first round three heats were held. The first three boats in each heat advanced to the semifinals, with the others relegated to the repechage.

The repechage offered rowers a second chance to qualify for the semifinals. Placing in the repechage determined which semifinal the boat would race in. The top three boats in the repechage moved on to the semifinals, with the remaining boats being eliminated.

Two semifinals were held, each with 6 boats. The top three boats from each heat advanced to Final A and competed for a medal. The remaining boats advanced to Final B.

The third and final round was the finals. Each final determined a set of rankings. The A final determined the medals, along with the rest of the places through 6th, while the B final gave rankings from 7th to 12th.

== Schedule ==
The competition is held over eight days. Times given are session start times; multiple rowing events might have races during a session.

All times are Central European Summer Time (UTC+2)

Date	Time	Round
Sunday, 28 July 2024	10:30	Heats
Monday, 29 July 2024	10:30	Repechage
Wednesday, 31 July 2024	10:54	Semifinals
Friday, 2 August 2024	10:54	Finals

== Results ==
=== Heats ===
The first three of each heat qualified for the semifinals, while the remainder went to the repechage.

==== Heat 1 ====
Rank	Lane	Rower	Nation	Time	Notes
1	3	Ymkje Clevering; Veronique Meester	Netherlands	7:17.81	Q
2	4	Kamilė Kralikaitė; Ieva Adomavičiūtė	Lithuania	7:22.53	Q
3	5	Azja Czajkowski; Jessica Thoennes	United States	7:25.52	Q
4	1	Hedvig Rasmussen; Fie Udby Erichsen	Denmark	7:30.91	R
5	2	Kate Haines; Alana Sherman	New Zealand	7:43.56	R

==== Heat 2 ====
Rank	Lane	Rower	Nation	Time	Notes
1	2	Ioana Vrînceanu; Roxana Anghel	Romania	7:24.27	Q
2	4	Aifric Keogh; Fiona Murtagh	Ireland	7:28.22	Q
3	1	Radka Novotníková; Pavlína Flamíková	Czech Republic	7:28.23	Q
4	3	Rebecca Edwards; Chloe Brew	Great Britain	7:29.70	R

==== Heat 3 ====
Rank	Lane	Rower	Nation	Time	Notes
1	1	Jessica Morrison; Annabelle McIntyre	Australia	7:16.58	Q
2	3	Evangelia Anastasiadou; Christina Bourmpou	Greece	7:20.49	Q
3	4	Melita Abraham; Antonia Abraham	Chile	7:23.01	Q
4	2	Esther Briz Zamorano; Aina Cid Centelles	Spain	7:24.09	R

=== Repechage ===
The first three pairs in the repechage qualified for the semifinals, while the fourth pair was eliminated.

Rank	Lane	Rower	Nation	Time	Notes
1	2	Hedvig Rasmussen; Fie Udby Erichsen	Denmark	7:34.57	Q
2	3	Esther Briz Zamorano; Aina Cid Centelles	Spain	7:36.98	Q
3	4	Rebecca Edwards; Chloe Brew	Great Britain	7:37.11	Q
4	1	Kate Haines; Alana Sherman	New Zealand	7:46.18	

=== Semifinals ===
The first three of each heat qualify to the Final A, other to Final B

==== Semifinal A/B 1 ====
Rank	Lane	Rower	Nation	Time	Notes
1	4	Ymkje Clevering; Veronique Meester	Netherlands	7:10.16	FA
2	3	Ioana Vrînceanu; Roxana Anghel	Romania	7:14.53	FA
3	5	Evangelia Anastasiadou; Christina Bourmpou	Greece	7:18.28	FA
4	6	Hedvig Rasmussen; Fie Udby Erichsen	Denmark	7:19.11	FB
5	1	Rebecca Edwards; Chloe Brew	Great Britain	7:28.76	FB
6	2	Radka Novotníková; Pavlína Flamíková	Czech Republic	7:33.68	FB

==== Semifinal A/B 2 ====
Rank	Lane	Rower	Nation	Time	Notes
1	4	Jessica Morrison; Annabelle McIntyre	Australia	7:14.14	FA
2	6	Azja Czajkowski; Jessica Thoennes	United States	7:15.59	FA
3	3	Kamilė Kralikaitė; Ieva Adomavičiūtė	Lithuania	7:19.27	FA
4	2	Melita Abraham; Antonia Abraham	Chile	7:26.82	FB
5	1	Esther Briz Zamorano; Aina Cid Centelles	Spain	7:30.36	FB
6	5	Aifric Keogh; Fiona Murtagh	Ireland	7:32.97	FB

=== Finals ===
==== Final B ====
Rank	Lane	Rower	Nation	Time	Notes
7	5	Esther Briz Zamorano; Aina Cid Centelles	Spain	7:07.08	
8	1	Aifric Keogh; Fiona Murtagh	Ireland	7:08.88	
9	4	Melita Abraham; Antonia Abraham	Chile	7:10.45	
10	6	Radka Novotníková; Pavlína Flamíková	Czech Republic	7:10.46	
11	3	Hedvig Rasmussen; Fie Udby Erichsen	Denmark	7:12.01	
12	2	Rebecca Edwards; Chloe Brew	Great Britain	7:16.02	

==== Final A ====
Rank	Lane	Rower	Nation	Time	Notes
1st place, gold medalist(s)	3	Ymkje Clevering; Veronique Meester	Netherlands	6:58.67	
2nd place, silver medalist(s)	5	Ioana Vrînceanu; Roxana Anghel	Romania	7:02.97	
3rd place, bronze medalist(s)	4	Jessica Morrison; Annabelle McIntyre	Australia	7:03.54	
4	2	Azja Czajkowski; Jessica Thoennes	United States	7:05.31	
5	1	Kamilė Kralikaitė; Ieva Adomavičiūtė	Lithuania	7:05.34	
6	6	Evangelia Anastasiadou; Christina Bourmpou	Greece	7:13.30	
