= 2023 World Rowing Championships – Women's eight =

Women's eight at the 2023 World Rowing Championships
- Venue: Lake Sava
- Location: Belgrade, Serbia
- Dates: 5 September – 10 September
- Competitors: 72 from 8 nations
- Winning time: 6:01.28

Medalists
gold medal	Maria-Magdalena Rusu; Roxana Anghel; Adriana Adam; Iuliana Buhus; Madalina Beres; Maria Tivodariu; Ioana Vrinceanu; Amalia Beres; Victoria-Ștefania Petreanu	Romania
silver medal	Emily Froehlich; Margaret Hedeman; Jessica Thoennes; Regina Salmons; Alina Hagstrom; Brooke Mooney; Mary Mazzio-Manson; Charlotte Buck; Cristina Castagna	United States
bronze medal	Paige Barr; Georgie Gleeson; Olympia Aldersey; Lily Alton-Triggs; Georgina Rowe; Jacqueline Swick; Molly Goodman; Bronwyn Cox; Hayley Verbunt	Australia

The women's eight competition at the 2023 World Rowing Championships took place at Lake Sava, in Belgrade.

== Schedule ==
The schedule was as follows:

Date	Time	Round
Tuesday 5 September 2023	13:40	Heats
Friday 8 September 2023	11:25	Repechages
Sunday 10 September 2023	11:51	Final B
Sunday 10 September 2023	14:10	Final A

All times are Central European Summer Time (UTC+2)

== Results ==
=== Heats ===
The fastest two boats in each heat advanced directly to the A final. The remaining boats were sent to the repechage.

==== Heat 1 ====
Rank	Rower	Country	Time	Notes
1	Froehlich, Hedeman, Thoennes, Salmons, Hagstrom, Mooney, Mazzio-Manson, Buck, Castagna	United States	6:18.36	FA
2	Barr, Gleeson, Aldersey, Triggs, Rowe, Swick, Goodman, Cox, Verbunt	Australia	6:20.56	R
3	Deane, Sevick, Edwards, Cronk, Gruchalla-Wesierski, Rosts, Payne, Wasteneys, Kit	Canada	6:23.92	R
4	Liu Nan, Yu Wen, Bao Lijun, Yu Siyuan, Xie Xiaohan, Zhang Hairong, Ren Wanning, Dong Xiya, Xu Xiaohan	China	6:40.39	R

==== Heat 2 ====
Rank	Rower	Country	Time	Notes
1	Rusu, Anghel, Adam, Buhus, Beres, Tivodariu, Vrinceanu, Beres, Petreanu	Romania	6:17.67	FA
2	Morrice, Edwards, Irwin, Bennett, Booth, Ford, Taylor, Campbell-Orde, Fieldman	Great Britain	6:23.85	R
3	Pelacchi, De Filippis, Gnatta, Rocek, Codato, Terrazzi, Mondelli, Bumbaca, Capponi	Italy	6:25.31	R
4	Lebahn, Saccomando, Heuser, Galland, Fritz, Clotten, Mührs, Kerstan, Fisch	Germany	6:39.51	R

=== Repechage ===
The fastest four boats advanced to the A final. The remaining boats were sent to the B final.

Rank	Rower	Country	Time	Notes
1	Barr, Gleeson, Aldersey, Triggs, Rowe, Swick, Goodman, Cox, Verbunt	Australia	6:19.66	FA
2	Morrice, Edwards, Irwin, Bennett, Booth, Ford, Taylor, Campbell-Orde, Fieldman	Great Britain	6:19.71	FA
3	Deane, Sevick, Edwards, Cronk, Gruchalla-Wesierski, Rosts, Payne, Wasteneys, Kit	Canada	6:24.08	FA
4	Pelacchi, De Filippis, Gnatta, Rocek, Codato, Terrazzi, Mondelli, Bumbaca, Capponi	Italy	6:29.37	FA
5	Lebahn, Saccomando, Heuser, Galland, Fritz, Clotten, Mührs, Kerstan, Fisch	Germany	6:39.56	FB
6	Liu Nan, Yu Wen, Bao Lijun, Yu Siyuan, Xie Xiaohan, Zhang Hairong, Ren Wanning, Dong Xiya, Xu Xiaohan	China	6:41.45	FB

=== Finals ===
The A final determined the rankings for places 1 to 6. Additional rankings were determined in the other finals.

==== Final B ====
Rank	Rower	Country	Time	Total rank
1	Liu Nan, Yu Wen, Bao Lijun, Yu Siyuan, Xie Xiaohan, Zhang Hairong, Ren Wanning, Dong Xiya, Xu Xiaohan	China	6:19.53	7
2	Lebahn, Saccomando, Heuser, Galland, Fritz, Clotten, Mührs, Kerstan, Fisch	Germany	6:20.83	8

==== Final A ====
Rank	Rower	Country	Time
1st place, gold medalist(s)	Rusu, Anghel, Adam, Buhus, Beres, Tivodariu, Vrinceanu, Beres, Petreanu	Romania	6:01.28
2nd place, silver medalist(s)	Froehlich, Hedeman, Thoennes, Salmons, Hagstrom, Mooney, Mazzio-Manson, Buck, Castagna	United States	6:03.73
3rd place, bronze medalist(s)	Barr, Gleeson, Aldersey, Triggs, Rowe, Swick, Goodman, Cox, Verbunt	Australia	6:04.17
4	Morrice, Edwards, Irwin, Bennett, Booth, Ford, Taylor, Campbell-Orde, Fieldman	Great Britain	6:05.40
5	Deane, Sevick, Edwards, Cronk, Gruchalla-Wesierski, Rosts, Payne, Wasteneys, Kit	Canada	6:07.15
6	Pelacchi, De Filippis, Gnatta, Rocek, Codato, Terrazzi, Mondelli, Bumbaca, Capponi	Italy	6:09.23
