= Camille Vandermeer =

American rower

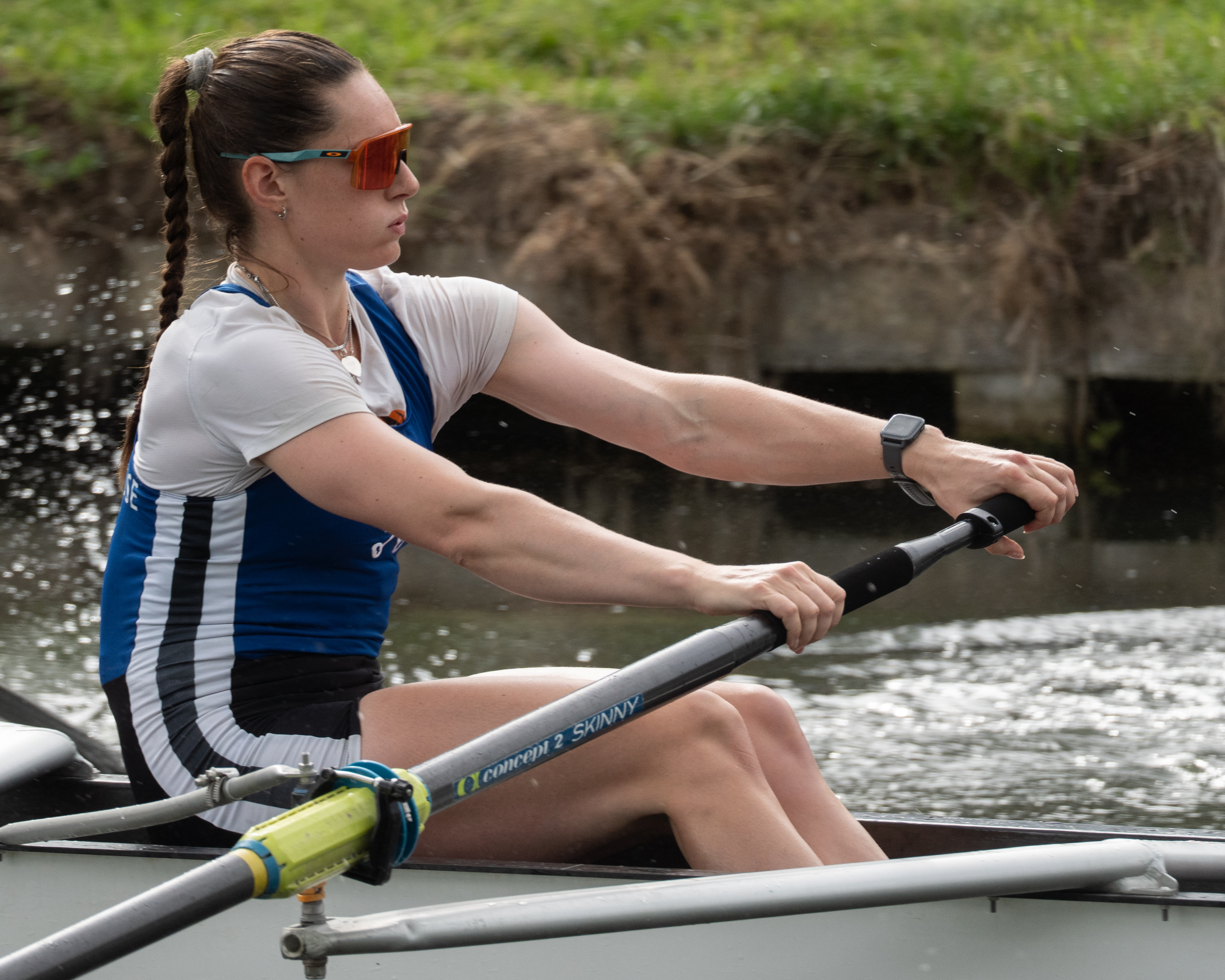
- Vandermeer at May Bumps in 2026

Personal information
- Born: 3 September 2000 (age 26)

Sport
- Country: United States
- Sport: Rowing
Medal record
Women's rowing
Representing United States
World Championships
Gold medal – first place	2025 Shanghai	Coxless four
Bronze medal – third place	2026 Amsterdam	Eight

Camille Vandermeer (born 3 September 2000) is an American rower. She was a gold medalist at the 2025 World Rowing Championships in the women's coxless four.

== Early and personal life ==
From Elmira, New York, she initially played soccer and also ran track at Notre Dame High School, before focusing on rowing. She is from a rowing family; her mother Sue rowed for Cornell University and her uncle, Andrew Kallfelz, is a rowing coach. She is the cousin of rowers Eliza and Emily Kallfelz. She competed at the 2018 World Rowing Junior Championships in the women's double, and went on to become the captain of the women's rowing team at Princeton University.

== Career ==
Alongside Azja Czajkowski, Teal Cohen and Kate Knifton she was a gold medalist as part of the American coxless four at the 2025 World Rowing Championships in Shanghai, China, in September 2025. They had also previously qualified fastest for the final. She went through the 2025 season unbeaten, having also won the 2025 World Rowing Cup series with victories in Varese and Lucerne.

In April 2026, she was part of the Cambridge University crew for The Boat Race 2026.
