= 2025 World Rowing Championships – Women's coxless four =

Women's coxless four at the 2025 World Rowing Championships
- Venue: Dianshan Lake
- Location: Shanghai, China
- Dates: 22–26 September
- Competitors: 49 from 12 nations
- Winning time: 6:27.71

Medalists
gold medal	Camille Vandermeer; Azja Czajkowski; Teal Cohen; Kate Knifton	United States
silver medal	Ancuța Bodnar; Dumitrița Juncănariu; Adriana Adam; Amalia Bereș	Romania
bronze medal	Juliette Lequeux; Rebecca Leigh; Isla Blake; Alana Sherman	New Zealand

The women's coxless four competition at the 2025 World Rowing Championships took place at Dianshan Lake, in Shanghai.

== Schedule ==
The schedule was as follows:

Date	Time	Round
Monday 22 September 2025	11:15	Heats
Friday, 26 September 2025	13:45	Final B
Friday, 26 September 2025	15:05	Final A

All times are UTC+08:00

== Results ==
=== Heats ===
The two fastest boats in each heat and the two fastest times advanced to the semifinals. The remaining boats were sent to the Final B.

==== Heat 1 ====
Rank	Rower	Country	Time	Notes
1	Camille Vandermeer; Azja Czajkowski; Teal Cohen; Kate Knifton	United States	6:29.75	FA
2	Ancuța Bodnar; Dumitrița Juncănariu; Adriana Adam; Amalia Bereș	Romania	6:30.87	FA
3	Lauren Irwin; Eve Stewart; Heidi Long; Megan Slabbert	Great Britain	6:33.60	FA
4	Wu Yongmei; Lin Xinyu; Ju Rui; Wang Zifeng	China	6:34.00	FA
5	Caileigh Filmer; Alexis Cronk; Sally Jones; Brenna Randall	Canada	6:40.79	FB
6	Violaine Aernoudts; Mya Bosquet; Margaux Bailleul; Fleur Vaucoret	France	6:42.55	FB

==== Heat 2 ====
Rank	Rower	Country	Time	Notes
1	Juliette Lequeux; Rebecca Leigh; Isla Blake; Alana Sherman	New Zealand	6:31.51	FA
2	Nika Johanna Vos; Hermijntje Drenth; Ymkje Clevering; Tinka Offereins	Netherlands	6:31.92	FA
3	Emmie Frederico; Eliza Gaffney; Georgina Rowe; Jacqui Swick	Australia	6:34.30	FB
4	Imogen Magner; Aisling Hayes; Emma Waters; Natalie Long	Ireland	6:35.57	FB
5	Elisabeth Kaalund Keller; Nanna Vigild; Karen Frost; Amalie Louise Thorsen	Denmark	6:46.29	FB
6	Sahoko Kinota; Haruna Sakakibara; Akiho Takano; Rena Suzuki	Japan	6:49.48	FB

=== Finals ===
The A final determined the rankings for places 1 to 6. Additional rankings were determined in the other finals.

==== Final B ====
Rank	Rower	Country	Time	Notes
1	Emmie Frederico; Eliza Gaffney; Georgina Rowe; Jacqui Swick	Australia	6:41.31	7
2	Caroline de Paiva; Alexis Cronk; Sally Jones; Brenna Randall	Canada	6:44.89	8
3	Imogen Magner; Aisling Hayes; Emma Waters; Natalie Long	Ireland	6:48.01	9
4	Violaine Aernoudts; Mya Bosquet; Margaux Bailleul; Fleur Vaucoret	France	6:52.50	10
5	Elisabeth Kaalund Keller; Nanna Vigild; Karen Frost; Amalie Louise Thorsen	Denmark	6:52.89	11
6	Sahoko Kinota; Haruna Sakakibara; Akiho Takano; Rena Suzuki	Japan	6:54.29	12

==== Final A ====
Rank	Rower	Country	Time	Notes
1st place, gold medalist(s)	Camille Vandermeer; Azja Czajkowski; Teal Cohen; Kate Knifton	United States	6:27.71	
2nd place, silver medalist(s)	Ancuța Bodnar; Dumitrița Juncănariu; Adriana Adam; Amalia Bereș	Romania	6:28.44	
3rd place, bronze medalist(s)	Juliette Lequeux; Rebecca Leigh; Isla Blake; Alana Sherman	New Zealand	6:31.11	
4	Nika Johanna Vos; Hermijntje Drenth; Ymkje Clevering; Tinka Offereins	Netherlands	6:33.33	
5	Lauren Irwin; Eve Stewart; Heidi Long; Megan Slabbert	Great Britain	6:33.76	
6	Wu Yongmei; Lin Xinyu; Ju Rui; Wang Zifeng	China	6:41.30	
