= 2026 World Rowing Championships – Women's coxless pair =

Women's coxless pair at the 2026 World Rowing Championships
- Venue: Bosbaan
- Location: Amsterdam, Netherlands
- Dates: 24–28 August
- Competitors: 36 from 18 nations
- Winning time: 6:49.86

Medalists
gold medal	Adriana Adam; Simona Radiș	Romania
silver medal	Emma Cornelis; Hézékia Péron	France
bronze medal	Regina Salmons; Mia Levy	United States

The women's coxless pair competition at the 2026 World Rowing Championships took place at Bosbaan, in Amsterdam.

== Schedule ==
The schedule was as follows:

Date	Time	Round
Monday 24 August 2026	17:39	Heats
Wednesday 26 August 2026	15:24	Final C
Wednesday 26 August 2026	17:27	Semifinals
Friday, 28 August 2026	14:54	Final B
Friday, 28 August 2026	17:28	Final A

All times are Central European Summer Time (UTC+2)

== Results ==
=== Heats ===
The two fastest boats in each heat and the six fastest times advanced to the semifinals. Other crews to Final C.

==== Heat 1 ====
Rank	Rower	Country	Time	Notes
1	Regina Salmons; Mia Levy	United States	7:46.79	SF
2	Emma Cornelis; Hézékia Péron	France	7:49.47	SF
3	Emmie Frederico; Katherine Easton	Australia	7:52.22	SF
4	Juliette Lequeux; Katherine Lush	New Zealand	7:55.88	SF
5	Akiho Takano; Shiho Yonekawa	Japan	8:20.12	FC
6	Lorrayne Lane Melo De Araujo; Mariana Macedo	Brazil	8:23.96	FC

==== Heat 2 ====
Rank	Rower	Country	Time	Notes
1	Adriana Adam; Simona Radiș	Romania	7:42.46	SF
2	Ugnė Juzėnaitė; Kamilė Kralikaitė	Lithuania	7:50.42	SF
3	Laura Meriano; Alice Codato	Italy	7:56.94	SF
4	Imogen Magner; Natalie Long	Ireland	8:03.42	SF
5	Ren Wanning; Zhu Hongshan	China	8:06.70	FC
6	Virginia Díaz Rivas; Iria Jarama Diaz	Spain	8:19.12	FC

==== Heat 3 ====
Rank	Rower	Country	Time	Notes
1	Melita Abraham; Antonia Abraham	Chile	7:51.95	SF
2	Anna Šantrůčková; Pavlína Flamíková	Czech Republic	7:56.30	SF
3	Luise Bachmann; Tabea Schendekehl	Germany	7:56.78	SF
4	Ivana Jurković; Josipa Jurković	Croatia	8:02.70	SF
5	Courtney Westley; Katherine Williams	South Africa	8:05.47	FC
6	Sofia Meakin; Olivia Roth	Switzerland	8:15.20	FC

=== Semifinals ===
The three fastest boats in each heat advance to the Final A. The remaining boats were sent to the Final B.

==== Semifinal 1 ====
Rank	Rower	Country	Time	Notes
1	Adriana Adam; Simona Radiș	Romania	7:20.94	FA
2	Melita Abraham; Antonia Abraham	Chile	7:29.85	FA
3	Laura Meriano; Alice Codato	Italy	7:31.34	FA
4	Juliette Lequeux; Katherine Lush	New Zealand	7:40.56	FB
5	Imogen Magner; Natalie Long	Ireland	7:41.74	FB
6	Ugnė Juzėnaitė; Kamilė Kralikaitė	Lithuania	7:47.59	FB

==== Semifinal 2 ====
Rank	Rower	Country	Time	Notes
1	Regina Salmons; Mia Levy	United States	7:25.01	FA
2	Emma Cornelis; Hézékia Péron	France	7:25.85	FA
3	Anna Šantrůčková; Pavlína Flamíková	Czech Republic	7:27.89	FA
4	Luise Bachmann; Tabea Schendekehl	Germany	7:29.74	FB
5	Emmie Frederico; Katherine Easton	Australia	7:32.99	FB
6	Ivana Jurković; Josipa Jurković	Croatia	7:37.57	FB

=== Finals ===
The A final determined the rankings for places 1 to 6. Additional rankings were determined in the other finals.

==== Final C ====
Rank	Rower	Country	Time	Total rank
1	Courtney Westley; Katherine Williams	South Africa	7:36.70	13
2	Ren Wanning; Zhu Hongshan	China	7:41.84	14
3	Virginia Díaz Rivas; Iria Jarama Diaz	Spain	7:42.56	15
4	Sofia Meakin; Olivia Roth	Switzerland	7:49.69	16
5	Lorrayne Lane Melo De Araujo; Mariana Macedo	Brazil	7:57.29	17
6	Akiho Takano; Shiho Yonekawa	Japan	7:59.75	18

==== Final B ====
Rank	Rower	Country	Time	Total rank
1	Luise Bachmann; Tabea Schendekehl	Germany	7:02.87	7
2	Emmie Frederico; Katherine Easton	Australia	7:06.34	8
3	Juliette Lequeux; Katherine Lush	New Zealand	7:07.51	9
4	Ugnė Juzėnaitė; Kamilė Kralikaitė	Lithuania	7:11.19	10
5	Imogen Magner; Natalie Long	Ireland	7:14.03	11
6	Ivana Jurković; Josipa Jurković	Croatia	7:31.47	12

==== Final A ====
Rank	Rower	Country	Time
1st place, gold medalist(s)	Adriana Adam; Simona Radiș	Romania	6:49.86
2nd place, silver medalist(s)	Emma Cornelis; Hézékia Péron	France	6:56.21
3rd place, bronze medalist(s)	Regina Salmons; Mia Levy	United States	6:59.76
4	Laura Meriano; Alice Codato	Italy	7:02.66
5	Anna Šantrůčková; Pavlína Flamíková	Czech Republic	7:03.82
6	Melita Abraham; Antonia Abraham	Chile	7:07.54
