= Hézékia Péron =

French rower (born 2005)

Personal information
- Nationality: French
- Born: 8 September 2005 (age 20)

Sport
- Country: France
- Sport: Rowing
Medal record
Women's rowing
Representing France
World Championships
Silver medal – second place	2025 Shanghai	Coxless pair
Silver medal – second place	2026 Amsterdam	Coxless pair

Hézékia Péron (born 8 September 2005) is a French rower.

== Career ==
Péron made her senior debut at the 2025 World Rowing Championships and won a silver medal in the coxless pair with a time of 7:13.31, along with Emma Cornelis. This was France's first medal in the event at the World Rowing Championships since Céline Garcia and Christine Gossé in 1995. She again competed at the 2026 World Rowing Championships and won a silver medal in the coxless pair with a time of 6:56.21.
