= Lily Alton-Triggs =

Australian rower (born 1998)

Lily Alton
Personal information
- Nationality: Australian
- Born: 29 September 1998 (age 27)

Sport
- Country: Australia
- Sport: Rowing
- Club: UQBC
Medal record
Women's rowing
Representing Australia
World Championships
Bronze medal – third place	2023 Belgrade	W8+

Lily Alton-Triggs (born 29 September 1998) is an Australian representative rower. She has represented at underage and senior World Championships and was selected in the 2023 Australian senior squad winning a bronze medal in the Australian women's eight at the 2023 World Rowing Championships.

== Club and state rowing ==
Alton-Triggs attended St Margaret's Anglican Girls' School Brisbane where she took up rowing. Her senior club rowing has been from the University of Queensland Boat Club.

Alton-Triggs first made Queensland state selection in the 2015 women's youth eight which contested and placed second for the Bicentennial Cup at the Interstate Regatta within the Australian Rowing Championships. She made further Queensland youth eight appearances for a Bicentennial Cup victory in 2016 and in 2017 to second place.

She made senior state selection for Queensland in 2019 when picked in the senior women's eight to contest the Queen's Cup at the Interstate Regatta. She rowed in further Queensland Queen's Cup eights in 2021 (3rd place) 2022 and 2023 (3rd place).

== International representative rowing ==
Alton-Trigg's Australian representative debut was in 2015 when selected in the Australian junior women's coxless four to compete at the 2015 World Junior Rowing Championships in Rio de Janeiro. They recorded an overall ninth-placed finish although they did not start in the B final for medical reasons. The next year she was selected to race a coxless pair with Annika Hoffman at the 2016 World Junior Championships in Rotterdam. They rowed to a fourth-place finish. In 2019 she was picked in a coxless four to race for Australia at the U23 World Rowing Championships in Sarasota. They finished in ninth place.

In March 2023 Alton-Triggs was selected in the Australian senior women's sweep-oar squad for the 2023 international season. At the Rowing World Cup II in Varese Italy, Alton-Triggs raced in the Australian women's eight. They led from the start in the A final and won the gold medal. At 2023's RWC III in Lucerne, the eight was unchanged. In the final they led through to the 1500m mark but finished in third place for the bronze medal. For the 2023 World Rowing Championships in Belgrade Serbia, the Australian women's eight was unchanged overall although Alton-Triggs moved from bow into the four seat. They finished 2nd in their heat and then needed to proceed through a repechage which they won. In the A final they led through the first 1000m on a low rating of 37/38 but were rowed through by the high-rating Romanians and a fast finishing USA eight. The Australians won the bronze medal, a 3rd place world ranking and Paris 2024 qualification.
