= Regina Salmons =

American rower (born 1997)

Personal information
- Nationality: American
- Born: April 21, 1997 (age 29) Methuen, Massachusetts
- Education: University of Pennsylvania
- Height: 6 ft 1 in (185 cm)
- Other interests: Poetry

Sport
- Country: United States
- Sport: Rowing
- Event: Women's eight
- College team: Penn Quakers

Achievements and titles
- Olympic finals: Tokyo 2020 W8+ Paris 2024 W8+
Medal record
Women's rowing
Representing the United States
World Championships
Silver medal – second place	2023 Belgrade	Eight
Bronze medal – third place	2026 Amsterdam	Coxless pair

Regina Salmons OLY (/rəˈdʒiːnə ˈsælmənz/ rə-JEE-nə SAL-mənz; born April 21, 1997) is an American rower and two-time Olympian. She competed in the women's eight event at the 2020 Summer Olympics and the women’s eight event at the 2024 Summer Olympics. She graduated from the University of Pennsylvania in 2018, where she earned honors for her thesis in creative writing and served as editor-in-chief of a feminist literary magazine on campus.

As a collegiate athlete, Salmons was a senior captain and rowed on Penn's Varsity Eight team, which placed third at the 2018 Ivy League Championships. That same year, she earned first-team All Ivy and Collegiate Rowing Coaches Association (CRCA) All-Conference recognition. With US Rowing, she finished fifth at the 2019 World Rowing Cup II, and won gold in the 2018 World Rowing Under 23 Championships in the pair. She also earned gold in the four and eight at the 2016 World Rowing Under 23 Championships.
