= Hayley Verbunt =

Australian rowing cox

Hayley Mead Verbunt
Personal information
- Born: 18 December 2002 (age 23) Malvern, Victoria, Australia
- Height: 169 cm (5 ft 7 in)

Sport
- Country: Australia
- Sport: Rowing
- Event: Women's eight (W8+)
- Club: Mercantile Rowing Club
- Coached by: John Keogh, Hally Champan
Medal record
Women's rowing
Representing Australia
World Championships
Bronze medal – third place	2023 Belgrade	W8+

Hayley Verbunt (born 18 December 2002) is an Australian representative rowing coxswain. She is a national senior and underage champion and in 2023 made the Australian senior squad winning a bronze medal in the Australian women's coxed eight at the 2023 World Rowing Championships.

== Club and state rowing ==
Verbunt attended Firbank Girls' Grammar School in Melbourne where she took up rowing. Her senior club rowing has been from Melbourne's Mercantile Rowing Club.

She first made Victorian state selection in the 2021 women's youth eight which competed for the Bicentennial Cup at the Interstate Regatta within the Australian Rowing Championships and in 2022 she coxed the Victorian men's youth eight at the Interstate Regatta. In 2023 she was selected in the Victorian women's senior eight which won the Queen's Cup.

In Mercantile colours she won the 2021 U21 Australian championship title in a women's coxed four and in 2022 she coxed an U23 men's 8+ at the Australian Rowing Championships. In 2022 she raced at the Henley Royal Regatta in the Wargrave Cup in a Mercantile women's club 8+.

== International representative rowing ==
Verbunt's Australian representative debut came in 2022 when she was selected in the Australian U21 squad to contest the Trans-Tasman series of match races against New Zealand youth crews. The Australian team were victorious on overall points and brought back the Rusty Robertson Trophy.

In March 2023 Verbunt was selected in Australian women's squad for the 2023 international season. At the Rowing World Cup II in Varese, Italy she steered the Australian women's eight. They led from the start in the A final and won the gold medal. At 2023's RWC III in Lucerne, the eight was unchanged. In the final they led through to the 1500m mark but finished in third place for the bronze medal. For the 2023 World Rowing Championships in Belgrade Serbia, the Australian women's eight was unchanged aside from some seat shifts in the bow end with Verbunt again in the stern. They finished 2nd in their heat and needed to proceed through a repechage which they won. In the A final they led through the first 1000m on a low rating of 37/38 but were rowed through by the high-rating Romanians and a fast finishing USA eight. The Australians won the bronze medal, a 3rd place world ranking and Paris 2024 qualification.
