= Josh Sale =

American baseball player (born 1991)

- Outfielder / Third baseman
- Born: July 5, 1991 (age 35); Seattle, Washington, U.S.
- Bats: Left Throws: Right
- Stats at Baseball Reference

Joshua Ezekiel Gasu Sale (born July 5, 1991) is an American former professional baseball outfielder and third baseman. He was drafted by the Tampa Bay Rays in the 1st round of the 2010 Major League Baseball draft.

== Career ==
Sale attended Bishop Blanchet High School in Seattle, Washington. During his senior year Sale batted .520 with 5 home runs, 6 doubles, and drove in 20 runs. Sale led Washington state with 13 home runs as a junior.

=== Tampa Bay Rays ===
The Tampa Bay Rays selected Sale in the first round, with the 17th overall selection, of the 2010 Major League Baseball draft. Sale was one of three Seattle area players selected by the Rays in the first three rounds of the draft, the others being Drew Vettleson and Ryan Brett. He made his professional debut in 2011 with the rookie ball Princeton Rays, slashing .210/.289/.346 in 60 games. In 2012, Sale played in 74 games for the Single-A Bowling Green Hot Rods, hitting .264/.391/.464 with 10 home runs and 44 RBI. In August 2012, Sale was suspended for fifty games for the use of banned stimulants. On May 29, 2013, the Rays suspended Sale for conduct detrimental to the organization regarding an incident involving a post on Facebook regarding a visit to a strip club. In 2014, Sale appeared in 90 games for the High-A Charlotte Stone Crabs, batting .238/.313/.344 with 4 home runs and 46 RBI. He was suspended yet again in August 2014 for a second drug violation. On February 27, 2015, Sale was released by the Rays organization.

=== Gastonia Honey Hunters ===
After spending 2015 through 2020 out of professional baseball, on May 21, 2021, Sale signed with the Gastonia Honey Hunters of the Atlantic League of Professional Baseball. Over 120 games in 2021, he hit .284/.394/.593/.986 with 34 home runs and 104 RBI. He became a free agent following the season.

=== Texas Rangers ===
On January 26, 2022, Sale signed a minor league contract with the Texas Rangers. In his first action in affiliated ball since 2014, he spent the majority of the season (72 games) with the Triple-A Round Rock Express, also appearing in 1 game for the Double-A Frisco RoughRiders. In 239 total at-bats, Sale slashed .226/.342/.414 with 11 home runs and 33 RBI. He elected free agency following the season on November 10.

On February 3, 2023, Sale re-signed with the Rangers on a new minor league contract. Sale hit just .179/.329/.328 with 3 home runs and 10 RBI in 24 games split between Frisco and Round Rock. He was released by the Rangers organization on June 3.
