= Bishop Blanchet High School =

School in Seattle, Washington, United States

Location
- 8200 Wallingford Avenue North; Seattle, (King County), Washington 98103; United States; 47.68930°N 122.33551°W

Information
- Other name: Blanchet
- School type: Private, college preparatory school
- Motto: Fons sapientiae verbum Dei (The fount of knowledge is the word of God.)
- Religious affiliation: Roman Catholic
- Founded: 1954; 72 years ago
- Oversight: Archdiocese of Seattle
- President: Antonio DeSapio
- Principal: Samuel Procopio
- Chaplain: Fr. Colin Parrish
- Faculty: 72.6 (2015–16)
- Grades: 9–12
- Gender: Coeducational
- Enrollment: 855 (2015–16)
- Average class size: 22
- Student to teacher ratio: 12∶1 (2015–16)
- Colors: Green; Gold
- Slogan: Tradition of Faith, Scholarship and Service.
- Athletics conference: Metro League
- Sports: Baseball • Basketball • Cross-country • Football • Golf • Lacrosse • Soccer • Softball • Swim and Dive • Tennis • Track and field • Ultimate • Volleyball • Wrestling
- Mascot: Braves (1954-2021); Bears (2022-present)
- Rivals: Seattle Prep. Panthers; O'Dea Irish; Holy Names Cougars
- Publication: Brave Magazine; Voices (Literary Magazine)
- Newspaper: The Miter
- Yearbook: Pallium
- Tuition: $19,450 (2021-22)
- Affiliation: NCEA
- Website: www.bishopblanchet.org
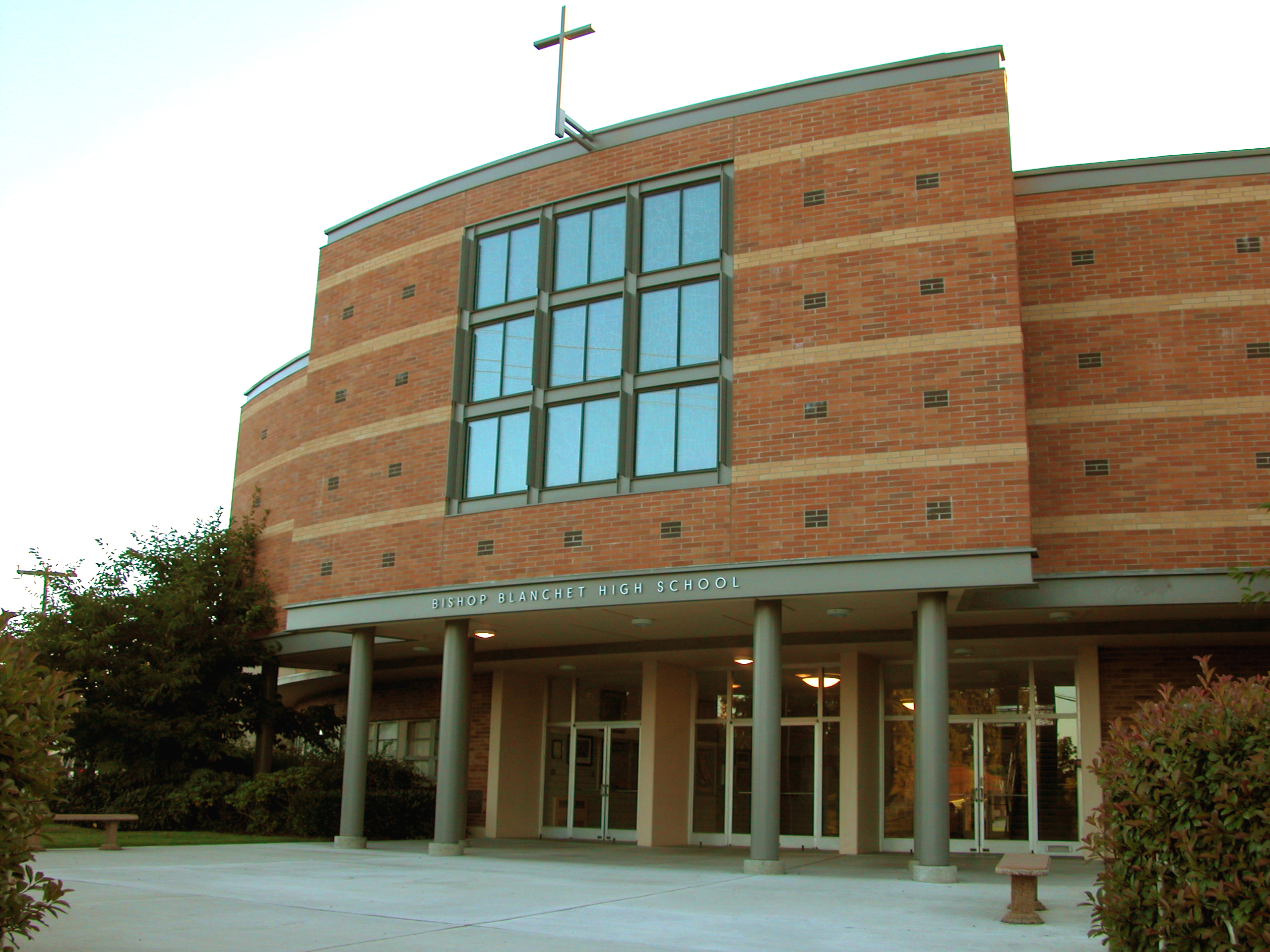
- Last updated: February 4, 2019; 7 years ago

Bishop Blanchet High School is a private coeducational Catholic high school located north of Green Lake in Seattle, United States. The school was founded in 1954 by the Archdiocese of Seattle, and named for the first bishop of the diocese, A.M.A. Blanchet (1797–1887). Originally named Blanchet High School, in 1999 the title Bishop was added to make the school easily identified as Catholic.

Bishop Blanchet has an enrollment of approximately 850 students, 60% of whom are Catholic. The school employs 73 teachers, 69 of them full-time. Most students come from Archdiocesan elementary and middle schools.

== Academics ==
Bishop Blanchet High School offers Honors and Advanced Placement courses.

== History ==
The school was founded in February 1954 and opened in 1955. The school underwent minor renovations in 2002, 2013 and 2025

== Extracurricular activities ==
Blanchet has a range of sports, clubs, and activities.

=== The Miter ===
Bishop Blanchet's student newspaper, The Miter, is published every month during the school year. Its articles are published on the newspaper's website.

=== Athletics ===
Blanchet has 36 teams in 17 interscholastic sports, It has won state championships in the following sports:

- Baseball (1): 1996
- Boys Basketball (1): 1963
- Girls Basketball (2): 1995, 1996
- Boys Cross Country (9): 1983, 1984, 1986, 1991, 1992, 2001, 2002, 2004, 2021
- Football (1): 1974
- Boys Soccer (2): 1974, 1980
- Softball (1): 1980
- Volleyball (4): 1991, 2004, 2006, 2009

==== Athletic scholarship scandal ====
In 2015, Bishop Blanchet High School self-reported that its athletics program had violated the recruiting policies of the Washington Interscholastic Activities Association (WIAA). A parent had been giving tuition assistance to a player on the girls' basketball team, and during investigation of what had happened, it was determined that the head coach of the football team had been administering a scholarship fund to provide tuition assistance for football players who would otherwise have been ineligible for financial aid.

The WIAA responded by expunging the records of the football and girls' basketball teams for several previous seasons and placing the school's athletic program on a two-year probation. The coach was dismissed from his head coaching position but was allowed to continue at the school as a physical education teacher, and the school began a training program to educate its staff about WIAA policies.

=== Arts ===
Bishop Blanchet High School provides band, choir, drama, and visual arts classes. The Drama department boasts a "black box" theater within the school premises, which serves as the venue for a fall play, one acts, improv performances, classes, and rehearsals. Additionally, every spring, Blanchet presents a musical at the Moore Theatre. In 2008, the school's Drama Program was recognized by Stage Directions magazine as "The Top High School Theatre Program in the Northwest".

=== Esports ===
A team of students representing Bishop Blanchet High School won the NintendoVS Splatoon 3 High School Exhibition at Nintendo Live 2023, defeating another high school in the Archdiocese of Seattle, O'Dea High School. During the 2022-2023 school year, the school's League of Legends team won both PlayVS season finals in the Mountain Region during both fall and spring seasons going undefeated in both, resulting in a perfect 24-0.

== Notable alumni ==
- Jon Jon Augustavo – filmmaker and music video director
- Caprice Benedetti – actress
- Gillian d'Hondt – professional basketball player (various European teams) and coach
- Bob Ferguson (1983) – lawyer, activist, politician; current Governor of Washington State
- Alina Hagstrom - internationally competitive rower
- Bianca Kajlich (1995) – actress
- Jake Lamb (2009) – professional baseball player (various MLB teams)
- Tom Lampkin – professional baseball player (various MLB teams)
- Thayne McCulloh (transferred before graduating) – President, Gonzaga University
- Ellis McLoughlin (2008) – professional soccer player (San Jose Earthquakes)
- Rick Redman (1961) – professional football player (San Diego Chargers and Portland Storm)
- Pat Shanahan (1980) – former Boeing executive and former acting United States Secretary of Defense
- Josh Sale (2010) – professional baseball player (Tampa Bay Rays)
- Joe Steele (1975) – college football player (University of Washington Huskies)
- Joseph J. Tyson (1975) – Bishop, Diocese of Yakima
- Tom Workman (1963) – professional basketball player (several NBA and ABA teams)
