= Margaret Hedeman =

American rower (born 2000)

Personal information
- Born: September 1, 2000 (age 26) Concord, Massachusetts , U.S.

Sport
- Country: United States
- Sport: Rowing

Achievements and titles
- Olympic finals: Paris 2024 W8+
Medal record
Women's rowing
Representing the United States
World Championships
Silver medal – second place	2023 Belgrade	Eight

Margaret Hedeman (born September 1, 2000) is an American rower. She competed at the 2024 Paris Olympics.

== Early life ==
She is from Concord, Massachusetts. She attended Concord-Carlisle High School. She began her rowing career at Community Rowing, Inc. in Boston, Massachusetts before studying at Yale University. She graduated from Yale in 2023 as a 2023 First-Team All-Ivy Selection, as well as a 2020, 2022 and 2023 CRCA Scholar Athlete.

== Career ==
Hedeman won a gold medal in the four at the 2018 World Rowing Junior Championships, and in the eight at the 2022 World Rowing U23 Championships.

She won a silver medal at the 2023 World Rowing Championships and placed third in the eight at the 2024 World Rowing Cup II. She competed in the women's eight at the 2024 Paris Olympics.
