= Jessica Morrison =

Australian rower (born 1992)

Jessica Morrison OAM
Personal information
- Nationality: Australian
- Born: 18 May 1992 (age 34) Fitzroy, Victoria, Australia
- Height: 1.80 m (5 ft 11 in)
- Weight: 72 kg (159 lb)

Sport
- Country: Australia
- Sport: Rowing
- Event: All sweep boats
- Club: Mercantile Rowing Club

Achievements and titles
- National finals: Queen's Cup 2016-21, 23
Medal record
Women's rowing
Representing Australia
Olympic Games
Gold medal – first place	2020 Tokyo	Coxless four
Bronze medal – third place	2024 Paris	Coxless pair
World Championships
Silver medal – second place	2019 Ottensheim	Coxless pair
Silver medal – second place	2019 Ottensheim	Eight
Silver medal – second place	2023 Belgrade	Coxless pair

Jessica Morrison OAM (born 18 May 1992) is an Australian representative rower and dual Olympian. She is an Australian national champion and won two silver medals at the 2019 World Rowing Championships. She competed in the Australian women's eight at the 2016 Summer Olympics and in two boats at the 2020 Tokyo Olympics doubling-up in the coxless pair and the coxless four. In the four at the Tokyo 2020 she won a gold medal and became an Olympic champion.

== Club and state rowing ==
Raised in Melbourne, Morrison's senior rowing was from the Mercantile Rowing Club.

Morrison was first selected to represent Victoria in the 2016 senior women's eight which won the Queen's Cup at the Interstate Regatta within the Australian Rowing Championships. She then rowed in the successful Victorian Queen's Cup eights of 2017 and 2018. She was in the 2019 Victorian crew who were finally beaten in the Queen's Cup by New South Wales after a fourteen year Victorian hold. In 2021 and 2023 she won further Queen's Cup victories in the Victorian women's eight.

At the New South Wales State Championships in February 2020 she rowed in crews which won the women's elite pair and the women's elite coxless four. In 2021 rowing with Annabelle McIntyre she won an Australian Championship title in the open women's coxless pair.

== International representative rowing ==
Morrison was in the Australian women's eight which initially missed qualification for the 2016 Rio Olympics but received a late call up following the Russian drug scandal. WADA had discovered Russian state sponsored drug testing violations and the IOC acted to protect clean athletes and set strict entry guidelines for Russian athletes resulting in most of their rowers and nearly all of their crews being withdrawn from the Olympic regatta. The crew had dispersed two months earlier after their failure to qualify but reconvened, travelled at the last minute to Rio and borrowed a shell. They finished last in their heat, last in the repechage and were eliminated.

In 2019 Morrison was back in representative contention and picked in the Australian women's sweep squad for the 2019 international season. With Annabelle McIntyre she was selected to race the coxless pair and they took a silver medal at Rowing World Cup II in Poznan and won the gold in that event at RWC III in Rotterdam. Morrison and McIntyre also secured seats at the pace-setting end of the Australian women's eight and rowing at seven behind Molly Goodman, Morrison won gold in Poznan and silver in Rotterdam. Morrison was selected in Australia's women's eight and also with McIntyre to race Australia's coxless pair at the 2019 World Rowing Championships in Linz, Austria. The pair were looking for a top eleven finish to qualify for the Tokyo Olympics and the eight was seeking a top five finish. In the pair they won their heat, quarter-final and semi-final, thereby qualifying the boat for Tokyo 2020. In the A-final they led the race through the 3 x 500m marks but were pipped by New Zealand in a close finish and took the silver medal. In the Australian women's eight they placed second in their heat, came through the repechage and led in the final from the start and at all three 500m marks until they were overrun by New Zealand by 2.7secs. The Australian eight took the silver medal and qualified for Tokyo 2020.

At the Tokyo Olympics in 2021 Morrison and McIntyre won their heat in the pair and two hours later backed-up in the four with Rosie Popa and Lucy Stephan to hold out a fast finishing Irish crew for another heat victory, setting a new Olympic best time in the process. Four days later in the final of the coxless four they led from the start, were challenged hard to the finish by the Dutch crew but took the gold in another Olympic best time. Two days rowing at the Olympic regatta were lost due to bad weather and in the reshuffled schedule Morrison and McIntyre's semi-final in the pair started less than two hours after the medal ceremony for the four. The girls were challenged in the semi and although they finished less a second behind the winning Greek pair, they were in fourth place and missed the cut of the A final. Morrison and McIntyre won the petite final the next day for an overall seventh place in the coxless pair at the Olympic regatta.

At the Henley Royal Regatta in 2022 Morrison teamed up with American Meghan Musnicki and went through to win the final of the Hambleden Pairs Challenge Cup over the British crew racing as Leander.

In March 2023 she was again selected with McIntyre in the Australian senior women's sweep-oar squad for the 2023 international season. At the Rowing World Cup II in Varese, Italy Morrison and McIntyre raced as Australia's 2- entrant. They dominated the field in the A final and won the gold medal. They backed up that performance three weeks later at the WRC III in Lucerne, winning their heat and semi-final and comfortably taking gold in the W2- final. Morrison and McIntyre contested the Australian women's pair at the 2023 World Rowing Championships in Belgrade, Serbia where they won their heat and semi-final at which point they qualified the boat for the 2024 Paris Olympics. In the A final they were headed by the Dutch pair of Clevering and Meester off the start and that position remained unchanged throughout the race. They had to settle for the silver medal and a second place world ranking from the regatta.

== Accolades ==
In the 2022 Australia Day Honours Morrison was awarded the Medal of the Order of Australia.
