= Georgie Gleeson =

Australian rower (born 1998)

Personal information
- Born: 8 September 1998 (age 27)
- Home town: Melbourne, Victoria, Australia
- Height: 173 cm (5 ft 8 in)

Sport
- Country: Australia
- Sport: Rowing
- Club: Sydney University Boat Club
- Coached by: John Keogh, Ellen Randell, Tom Westgarth
Medal record
Women's rowing
Representing Australia
World Championships
Bronze medal – third place	2023 Belgrade	W8+

Georgie Gleeson (born 8 September 1998) is an Australian representative sweep-oar rower. She is an Australian national champion and has represented and medalled at senior World Championships.

== Club and state rowing ==
Gleeson's senior club rowing was from the Mercantile Rowing Club on Melbourne. After making national training squads and relocating to Sydney she rowed from the Sydney University Boat Club.

Gleeson first made Victorian state selection in the 2017 women's youth eight which contested and won the Bicentennial Cup at the Interstate Regatta within the Australian Rowing Championships. She made a second Victorian youth eight appearance for another Bicentennial Cup victory in 2018.

In 2021 Gleeson moved into the Victorian's women's senior eight which contested and won the Queen's Cup at the Interstate Regatta. In 2022 and 2023 she again raced in Victorian Queen's Cup eights to victory.

== International representative rowing ==
Gleeson was selected in the Australian senior training team for the 2022 international season and the 2022 World Rowing Championships. She raced in a single scull at the World Rowing Cup II in June 2022 to a silver medal. At the 2022 World Rowing Championships at Racize, she rowed Australia's coxless pair with Eliza Gaffney. They finished third in the B final for an overall ninth place finish at the regatta.

In March 2023 Gleeson was again selected in the Australian senior women's sweep-oar squad for the 2023 international season. At the Rowing World Cup II in Varese Italy, Gleeson raced in the Australian women's eight. They led from the start in the A final and won the gold medal. At 2023's RWC III in Lucerne, the eight was unchanged. In the final they led through to the 1500m mark but finished in third place for the bronze medal. For the 2023 World Rowing Championships in Belgrade Serbia, the Australian women's eight was unchanged overall although Gleeson moved into the two seat. They finished 2nd in their heat and then needed to proceed through a repechage which they won. In the A final they led through the first 1000m on a low rating of 37/38 but were rowed through by the high-rating Romanians and a fast finishing USA eight. The Australians won the bronze medal, a 3rd place world ranking and Paris 2024 qualification.
