= 2026 World Rowing Championships – Women's coxless four =

Women's coxless four at the 2026 World Rowing Championships
- Venue: Bosbaan
- Location: Amsterdam, Netherlands
- Dates: 25–29 August
- Competitors: 52 from 13 nations
- Winning time: 6:09.87

Medalists
gold medal	Molly Bruggeman; Azja Czajkowski; Teal Cohen; Kate Knifton	United States
silver medal	Giorgia Patten; Bronwyn Cox; Jacqueline Swick; Georgina Rowe	Australia
bronze medal	Ymkje Clevering; Nika Johanna Vos; Linn van Aanholt; Tinka Offereins	Netherlands

The women's coxless four competition at the 2026 World Rowing Championships will take place at Bosbaan, in Amsterdam.

== Schedule ==
The schedule was as follows:

Date	Time	Round
Tuesday, 25 August 2026	13:37	Heats
Thursday, 27 August 2026	15:25	Semifinals
Saturday, 29 August 2026	10:45	Final B
Saturday, 29 August 2026	12:01	Final A

All times are Central European Summer Time (UTC+2)

== Results ==
=== Heats ===
The two fastest boats in each heat and the six fastest times advanced to the semifinals. Remaining crew eliminated.

==== Heat 1 ====
Rank	Rower	Country	Time	Notes
1	Giorgia Patten; Bronwyn Cox; Jacqueline Swick; Georgina Rowe	Australia	7:09.67	SF
2	Ancuța Bodnar; Maria Tivodariu; Maria-Magdalena Rusu; Dumitrița Juncănariu	Romania	7:17.15	SF
3	Ella Cossill; Kate Haines; Isla Blake; Alana Sherman	New Zealand	7:22.55	SF
4	Karen Mortensen; Amalie Louise Thorsen; Clara Hornnaess; Frida Werner Foldager	Denmark	7:28.98	SF
5	Zhang Shuxian; Li Duolei; Zhang Yangjing; Liu Yaqi	China	7:39.87	SF

==== Heat 2 ====
Rank	Rower	Country	Time	Notes
1	Ymkje Clevering; Nika Johanna Vos; Linn van Aanholt; Tinka Offereins	Netherlands	7:11.34	SF
2	Sarah Marshall; Eleanor Brinkhoff; Angharad Broughton; Holly Youd	Great Britain	7:22.78	SF
3	Ekaterina Zhevlachenko; Ekaterina Glazkova; Marina Rubtsova; Valentina Plaksina	Individual Neutral Athletes	7:31.36	SF
4	Zuzanna Madaj; Kamila Jasinska; Anna Potrzuska; Weronika Ludwiczak	Poland	7:45.77	

==== Heat 3 ====
Rank	Rower	Country	Time	Notes
1	Molly Bruggeman; Azja Czajkowski; Teal Cohen; Kate Knifton	United States	7:10.10	SF
2	Claire Feerick; Aisling Hayes; Emma Waters; Emma Fagan	Ireland	7:21.08	SF
3	Silvia Terrazzi; Elisa Mondelli; Angelica Merlini; Giorgia Pelacchi	Italy	7:29.03	SF
4	Hannah Reif; Paula Hartmann; Annabelle Rachmann; Pia Greiten	Germany	7:31.33	SF

=== Semifinals ===
The three fastest boats in each heat advance to the Final A. The remaining boats were sent to the Final B.

==== Semifinal 1 ====
Rank	Rower	Country	Time	Notes
1	Giorgia Patten; Bronwyn Cox; Jacqueline Swick; Georgina Rowe	Australia	6:35.52	FA
2	Ymkje Clevering; Nika Johanna Vos; Linn van Aanholt; Tinka Offereins	Netherlands	6:38.15	FA
3	Hannah Reif; Paula Hartmann; Annabelle Rachmann; Pia Greiten	Germany	6:44.19	FA
4	Claire Feerick; Aisling Hayes; Emma Waters; Emma Fagan	Ireland	6:47.44	FB
5	Karen Mortensen; Amalie Louise Thorsen; Clara Hornnaess; Frida Werner Foldager	Denmark	7:00.29	FB
6	Zhang Shuxian; Li Duolei; Zhang Yangjing; Liu Yaqi	China	7:03.30	FB

==== Semifinal 2 ====
Rank	Rower	Country	Time	Notes
1	Molly Bruggeman; Azja Czajkowski; Teal Cohen; Kate Knifton	United States	6:34.05	FA
2	Ancuța Bodnar; Maria Tivodariu; Maria-Magdalena Rusu; Dumitrița Juncănariu	Romania	6:42.06	FA
3	Sarah Marshall; Eleanor Brinkhoff; Angharad Broughton; Holly Youd	Great Britain	6:45.13	FA
4	Ella Cossill; Kate Haines; Isla Blake; Alana Sherman	New Zealand	6:51.94	FB
5	Ekaterina Zhevlachenko; Ekaterina Glazkova; Marina Rubtsova; Valentina Plaksina	Individual Neutral Athletes	6:55.44	FB
6	Silvia Terrazzi; Elisa Mondelli; Angelica Merlini; Giorgia Pelacchi	Italy	6:58.44	FB

=== Finals ===
The A final determined the rankings for places 1 to 6. Additional rankings were determined in the other finals.

==== Final B ====
Rank	Rower	Country	Time	Total rank
1	Claire Feerick; Aisling Hayes; Emma Waters; Emma Fagan	Ireland	6:26.34	7
2	Ella Cossill; Kate Haines; Isla Blake; Alana Sherman	New Zealand	6:29.00	8
3	Ekaterina Zhevlachenko; Ekaterina Glazkova; Marina Rubtsova; Valentina Plaksina	Individual Neutral Athletes	6:35.44	9
4	Karen Mortensen; Amalie Louise Thorsen; Clara Hornnaess; Frida Werner Foldager	Denmark	6:37.97	10
5	Zhang Shuxian; Li Duolei; Zhang Yangjing; Liu Yaqi	China	6:45.26	11
6	Silvia Terrazzi; Elisa Mondelli; Angelica Merlini; Giorgia Pelacchi	Italy	7:49.07	12

==== Final A ====
Rank	Rower	Country	Time
1st place, gold medalist(s)	Molly Bruggeman; Azja Czajkowski; Teal Cohen; Kate Knifton	United States	6:09.87
2nd place, silver medalist(s)	Giorgia Patten; Bronwyn Cox; Jacqueline Swick; Georgina Rowe	Australia	6:12.40
3rd place, bronze medalist(s)	Ymkje Clevering; Nika Johanna Vos; Linn van Aanholt; Tinka Offereins	Netherlands	6:13.74
4	Ancuța Bodnar; Maria Tivodariu; Maria-Magdalena Rusu; Dumitrița Juncănariu	Romania	6:29.27
5	Sarah Marshall; Eleanor Brinkhoff; Angharad Broughton; Holly Youd	Great Britain	6:31.97
6	Hannah Reif; Paula Hartmann; Annabelle Rachmann; Pia Greiten	Germany	6:42.33
