= Veronique Meester =

Dutch rower (born 1995)

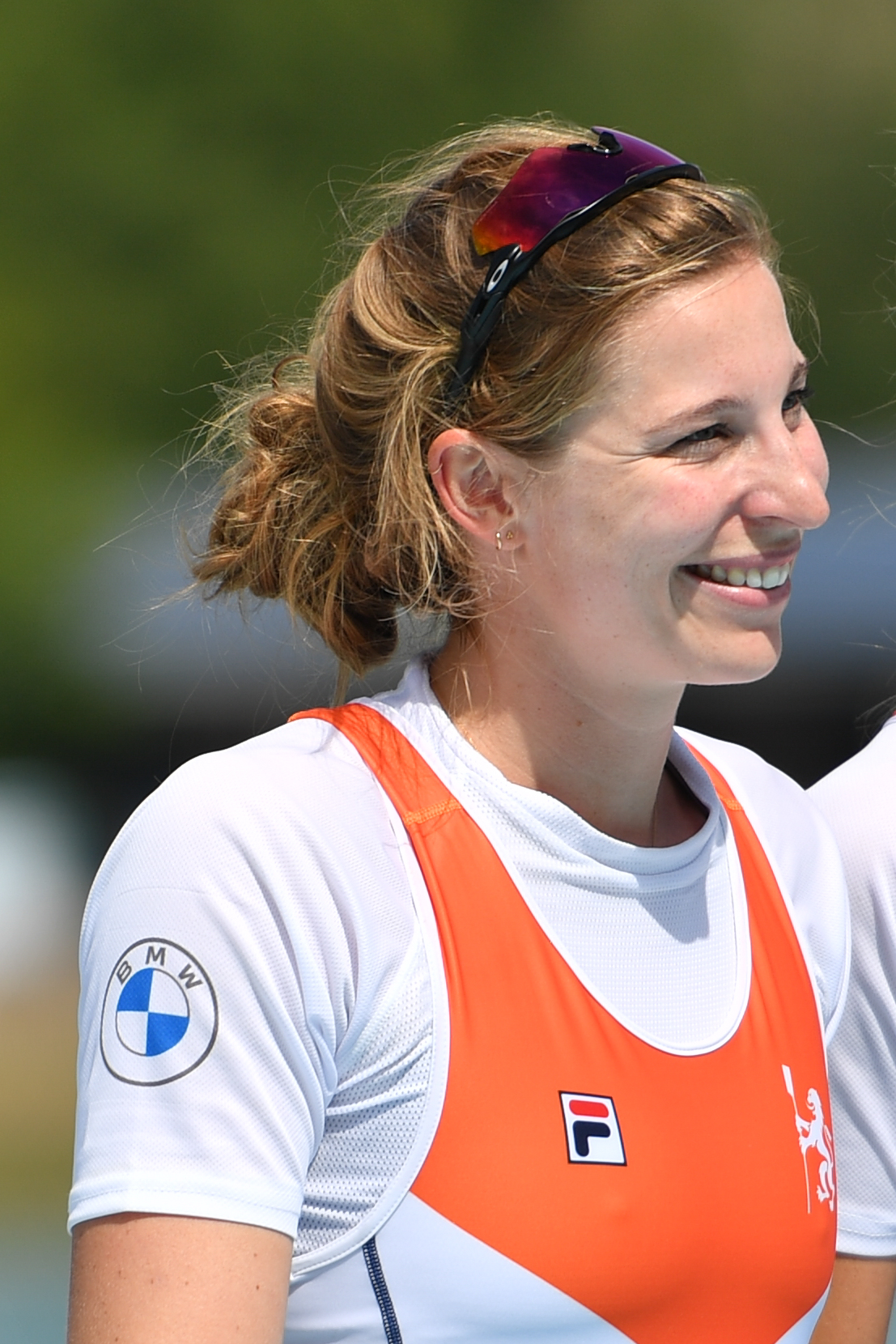
- Meester in 2022

Personal information
- Nationality: Dutch
- Born: 7 April 1995 (age 31)

Sport
- Country: Netherlands
- Sport: Rowing
- Events: Coxless four, coxless pair, eight
Medal record
Women's rowing
Representing the Netherlands
Olympic Games
Gold medal – first place	2024 Paris	Coxless pair
Silver medal – second place	2020 Tokyo	Coxless four
World Championships
Gold medal – first place	2023 Belgrade	Coxless pair
Silver medal – second place	2019 Ottensheim	Coxless four
Silver medal – second place	2022 Račice	Coxless pair
Silver medal – second place	2022 Račice	Eight
European Championships
Gold medal – first place	2019 Lucerne	Coxless four
Gold medal – first place	2020 Poznań	Coxless four
Gold medal – first place	2021 Varese	Coxless four
Silver medal – second place	2017 Račice	Eight
Silver medal – second place	2023 Bled	Coxless pair
Bronze medal – third place	2022 Oberschleißheim	Coxless pair
Bronze medal – third place	2022 Oberschleißheim	Eight

Veronique Meester (born 7 April 1995) is a Dutch rower. She was a member of the Dutch coxless four, along with Ellen Hogerwerf, Ymkje Clevering and Karolien Florijn, that won an Olympic silver medal in Tokyo 2020. The same crew was a three-time European Champion (in 2019, 2020 and 2021) and won a silver medal at the 2019 World Rowing Championships. In August 2022 Meester and her former coxless four teammate Ymkje Clevering won the bronze medal in the coxless pair at the European Championships in Munich. In the same setup with Clevering, she went on to win the 2023 World Championships and won Gold at the 2024 Summer Olympics.
