= Iuliana Buhuș =

Romanian rower

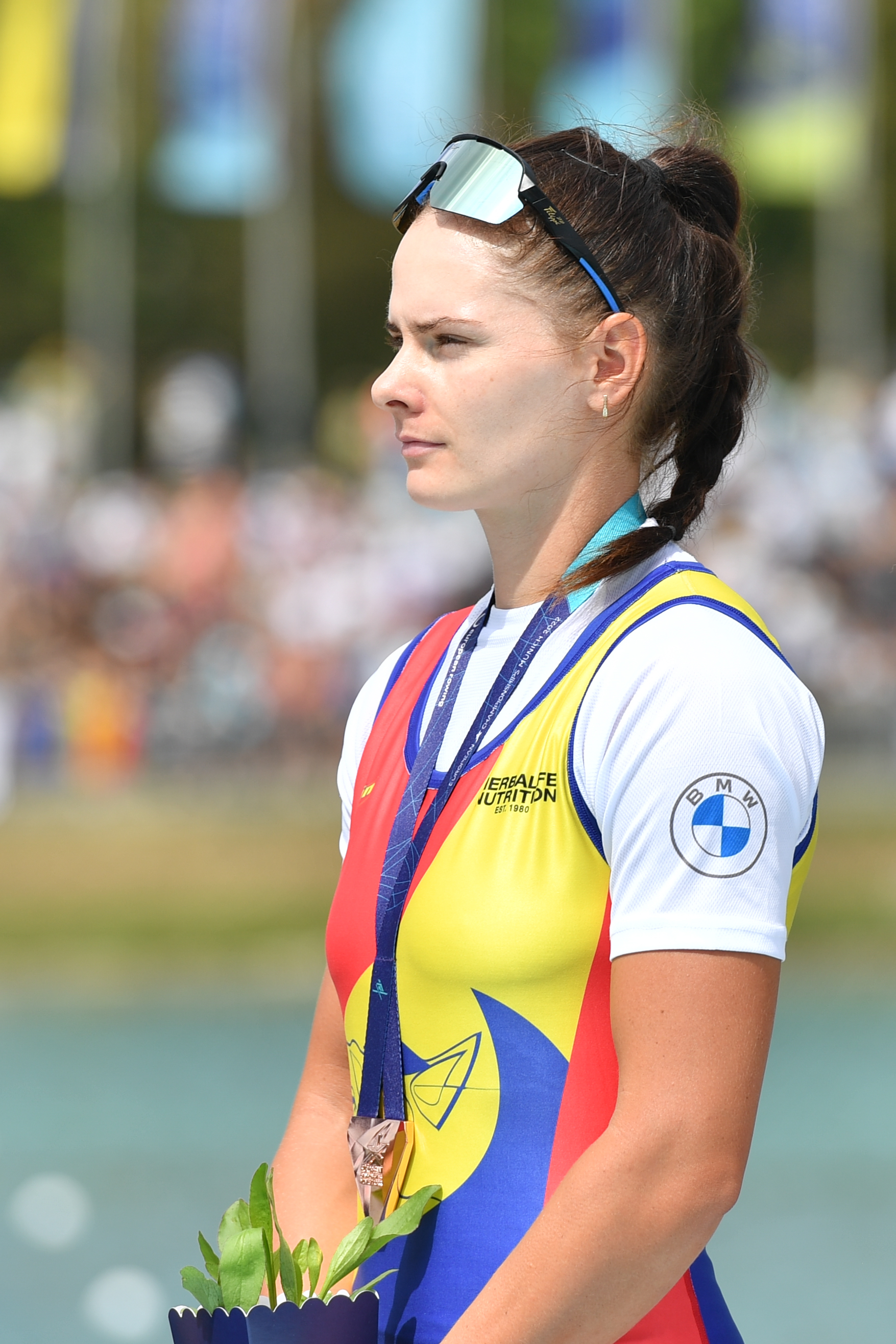

Personal information
- Nationality: Romanian
- Born: 4 July 1995 (age 30) Bârlad, Romania
- Height: 1.80 m (5 ft 11 in)

Sport
- Country: Romania
- Sport: Rowing
Medal record
Women's rowing
Representing Romania
World Championships
Gold medal – first place	2022 Račice	Eight
Gold medal – first place	2023 Belgrade	Eight
European Championships
Gold medal – first place	2020 Poznań	Coxless pair
Gold medal – first place	2022 Munich	Eight
Silver medal – second place	2018 Glasgow	Coxless four
Silver medal – second place	2021 Varese	Coxless pair
Bronze medal – third place	2022 Munich	Coxless four

Iuliana Buhuș (born 4 July 1995) is a Romanian rower. She competed in the 2020 Summer Olympics.
