= Paige Barr =

Australian rower (born 2001)

Personal information
- Born: 31 May 2001 (age 25) Bairnsdale, Victoria, Australia
- Height: 174 cm (5 ft 9 in)

Sport
- Country: Australia
- Sport: Rowing
- Club: Merantile Boat Club
- Coached by: John Keogh, Hally Chapman
Medal record
Women's rowing
Representing Australia
World Championships
| Bronze medal – third place | 2023 Belgrade | W8+ |

Paige Barr (born 31 May 2001) is an Australian representative sweep-oar rower. She has represented Australia at senior World Championships and won medals at World Rowing Cups at senior and underage World Championships.

== Club and state rowing ==
Barr was raised in Bairnsdale, Victoria and attended Gippsland Grammar School, where she took up rowing. Her senior club rowing has been with the University of Queensland Rowing Club in Brisbane.

Barr first made state selection for Victoria in the 2021 women's U21 youth eight and followed this up with selection in the 2022 women's eight, which contested and won the Queen's Cup at the Interstate Regatta within the Australian Rowing Championships. She raced in another Victorian senior women's eight to a Queen's Cup victory in 2023.

Racing in Mercantile colours, she won the Australian championship title in the U21 coxless four at the 2021 Australian Rowing Championships and, in 2022, won silver in the national women's U23 single scull title.

== International representative rowing ==
In March 2022, Barr was selected for the Australian training squad for the 2022 international season and the 2022 World Rowing Championships. She rowed in the three-seat of the Australian women's eight at World Rowing Cups II and III, taking bronze in Poznan and winning gold in Lucerne. She was then selected for Australia’s U23 coxless four to row at the U23 World Rowing Championships in Varese, alongside Jacqueline Swick and Eliza Gaffney, and received a bronze medal. At the 2022 World Rowing Championships at Racize, she was back in the Australian women's senior eight. They made the A final and finished in fifth place.

In March 2023, she was again selected in the Australian senior women's sweep-oar squad for the 2023 international season. At the Rowing World Cup II in Varese Italy, Barr raced in the Australian women's eight. They led from the start in the A final and won the gold medal. At 2023's RWC III in Lucerne, the eight was unchanged. In the final, they led through to the 1500m mark but finished in third place for the bronze medal. For the 2023 World Rowing Championships in Belgrade Serbia, the Australian women's eight was unchanged overall although Barr moved into the bow seat. They finished 2nd in their heat and then needed to proceed through a repechage.

== Personal life ==
Barr currently studies a Bachelor of Exercise and Sport Science at Deakin University.

== External link, ==
- Paige Barr at World Rowing
- Paige Barr at Rowing Australia (archive)
- Paige Barr at the Australian Olympic Committee
- Paige Barr at Olympics.com
- Paige Barr at the Paris 2024 Summer Olympics (archived, alternate link)
- Paige Barr on TikTok
