= Brooke Mooney =

American rower

Personal information
- Nationality: American
- Born: February 15, 1996 (age 30)
- Height: 1.91 m (6 ft 3 in)

Sport
- Country: United States
- Sport: Rowing

Achievements and titles
- Olympic finals: Tokyo 2020 W8+
Medal record
Women's rowing
Representing the United States
World Championships
| Silver medal – second place | 2023 Belgrade | Eight |

Brooke Mooney (born February 15, 1996) is an American rower. She competed in the women's eight event at the 2020 Summer Olympics.
