= Annabelle McIntyre =

Australian rower (born 1996)

Annabelle McIntyre OAM
Personal information
- Nationality: Australian
- Born: 12 September 1996 (age 29) Hamilton Hill, Western Australia, Australia
- Height: 1.80 m (5 ft 11 in)

Sport
- Country: Australia
- Sport: Rowing
- Event: All sweep boats
- Club: Fremantle Rowing Club

Achievements and titles
- National finals: Queen's Cup 2015, 2017-22; Nell Slatter Trophy 2018
Medal record
Women's rowing
Representing Australia
Olympic Games
Gold medal – first place	2020 Tokyo	Coxless four
Bronze medal – third place	2024 Paris	Coxless pair
World Championships
Silver medal – second place	2019 Ottensheim	Coxless pair
Silver medal – second place	2019 Ottensheim	Eight
Silver medal – second place	2023 Belgrade	Coxless pair
Bronze medal – third place	2018 Plovdiv	Eight
Bronze medal – third place	2022 Račice	Coxless four
U23 World Championships
Silver medal – second place	2017 Plovdiv	Coxless pair

Annabelle McIntyre OAM (born 12 September 1996) is an Australian national representative rower. She is an Olympic champion, a multiple Australian national champion and won medals at the 2019 World Rowing Championships and 2018 World Championships. She was selected as a 2021 Tokyo Olympian and doubled-up, racing both the Australian coxless pair and the coxless four. In the four she stroked the Australian crew to a gold medal victory.

== Club and state rowing ==
Raised in Hamilton Hill, Western Australia McIntyre took up rowing in 2013 at the Fremantle Rowing Club.

Her state representative debut for Western Australia came in the 2014 youth eight which contested the Bicentennial Cup at the Interstate Regatta within the Australian Rowing Championships. She made West Australia's senior women's eight in 2015 and contested the Queen's Cup at the Interstate Regatta for WA in 2015 and from 2017 to 2021. In 2018 she was also Western Australia's single sculls entrant racing for the Nell Slatter Trophy at the Interstate Regatta. She placed third in the single scull. In 2019 she was seated in the West Australian women's eight who placed third in the Queen's Cup. In 2021 and 2022 she again rowed in the WA Queen's Cup eight, stroking that crew in 2022.

In 2018 she crewed a composite Australian selection eight which won the open women's eight title at the Australian Rowing Championships and in a composite Australian selection four she won the 2018 open women's coxless four national title. At the New South Wales State Championships in February 2020 she rowed in crews which won the women's elite pair and the women's elite coxless four. In 2021 rowing with Jessica Morrison she won an Australian Championship title in the open women's coxless pair.

== International representative rowing ==
McIntyre made her Australian representative debut in a coxless pair at the 2017 World Rowing U23 Championships. Rowing with Bronwyn Cox she won a silver medal. In 2018 McIntyre was elevated to the senior Australian squad. She didn't race in an Australian boat in their early international campaign of 2018 but at the 2018 World Rowing Championships in Plovdiv, McIntyre moved into the five seat of the Australian women's eight. They won their heat and placed third in the final, winning McIntyre a bronze world championship medal.

McIntyre was picked in the Australian women's sweep squad for the 2019 international season. With Jessica Morrison she was selected to race the coxless pair and they took a silver medal at Rowing World Cup II in Poznan and won gold in that event at RWC III in Rotterdam. McIntyre and Morrison also secured seats at the pace-setting end of the Australian women's eight and rowing at six, McIntyre won gold in Poznan and silver in Rotterdam. She was again selected in the Australian women's eight and also with Morrison to race Australia's coxless pair at the 2019 World Rowing Championships in Linz, Austria. The pair were looking for a top eleven finish to qualify for the Tokyo Olympics and the eight was seeking a place in the top five. The pair won their heat, quarter-final and semi-final, thereby qualifying that boat for Tokyo 2020. In the A-final they led the race through the 3 x 500m marks but were pipped by New Zealand in a close finish and took the silver medal. In the Australian women's eight they placed second in their heat, came through the repechage and led in the final from the start and at all three 500m marks till they were overrun by New Zealand by 2.7secs. The Australian eight took the silver medal and qualified for Tokyo 2020.

At the Tokyo Olympics in 2021 Morrison and McIntyre won their heat in the pair and two hours later backed-up in the four with Rosie Popa and Lucy Stephan to hold out a fast finishing Irish crew for another heat victory, setting a new Olympic best time in the process. Four days later in the final of the coxless four they led from the start, were challenged hard to the finish by the Dutch crew but took the gold in another Olympic best time. Two days rowing at the Olympic regatta were lost due to bad weather and in the reshuffled schedule Morrison and McIntyre's semi-final in the pair started less than two hours after the medal ceremony for the four. The girls were challenged in the semi and although they finished less a second behind the winning Greek pair, they were in fourth place and missed the cut of the A final. Morrison and McIntyre won the petite final the next day for an overall seventh place in the coxless pair at the Olympic regatta.

McIntyre was selected in the Australian women's sweep squad for the 2022 international season and the 2022 World Rowing Championships. She stroked the Australian women's coxless four at the World Rowing Cup II in Poznan to a gold medal victory. At the 2022 World Rowing Championships at Racize, she stroked the Australian coxless four to a bronze medal.

In March 2023 she was again selected in the Australian senior women's sweep-oar squad for the 2023 international season. At the WRC II in Varese Italy, McIntyre and Morrison raced as Australia's 2- entrant. They dominated the field in the A final and won the gold medal. They backed up that performance three weeks later at the WRC III in Lucerne, winning their heat and semi-final and comfortably taking gold in the W2- final. McIntyre and Morrison contested the Australian women's pair at the 2023 World Rowing Championships in Belgrade, Serbia where they won their heat and semi-final at which point they qualified the boat for the 2024 Paris Olympics. In the A final they were headed by the Dutch pair of Clevering and Meester off the start and that position remained unchanged throughout the race. They had to settle for the silver medal and a second place world ranking from the regatta.

== Accolades ==
In the 2022 Australia Day Honours McIntyre was awarded the Medal of the Order of Australia.
