= 2025 World Rowing Championships – Women's coxless pair =

Women's coxless pair at the 2025 World Rowing Championships
- Venue: Dianshan Lake
- Location: Shanghai, China
- Dates: 21–25 September
- Competitors: 30 from 15 nations
- Winning time: 7:08.52

Medalists
gold medal	Maria-Magdalena Rusu; Simona Radiș	Romania
silver medal	Emma Cornelis; Hezekia Peron	France
bronze medal	Jessica Thoennes; Holly Drapp	United States

The women's pair competition at the 2025 World Rowing Championships took place at Dianshan Lake, in Shanghai.

== Schedule ==
The schedule was as follows:

Date	Time	Round
Sunday 21 September 2025	10:19	Heats
Tuesday 23 September 2025	10:43	Semifinals
Thursday, 25 September 2025	13:35	Final B
Thursday, 25 September 2025	14:30	Final A

All times are UTC+08:00

== Results ==
=== Heats ===
The two fastest boats in each heat and the next six fastest times advanced to the semifinals. The remaining boats were sent to Final C.

==== Heat 1 ====
Rank	Rower	Country	Time	Notes
1	Emma Cornelis; Hezekia Peron	France	6:57.51	SF
2	Laura Meriano; Alice Codato	Italy	6:58.04	SF
3	Jessica Thoennes; Holly Drapp	United States	7:00.17	SF
4	Aoife Casey; Emily Hegarty	Ireland	7:13.17	FC
5	Marina Rubtsova; Valentina Plaksina	Individual Neutral Athletes	7:15.56	FC

==== Heat 2 ====
Rank	Rower	Country	Time	Notes
1	Jovana Arsić; Elena Oriabinskaia	Serbia	7:01.03	SF
2	Melita Abraham; Antonia Abraham	Chile	7:02.42	SF
3	Elizabeth Witt; Jade Lindo	Great Britain	7:03.44	SF
4	Anna Šantrůčková; Pavlína Flamíková	Czech Republic	7:03.57	SF
5	Sheung Yee Wong; King Wan Leung	Hong Kong	7:37.30	FC

==== Heat 3 ====
Rank	Rower	Country	Time	Notes
1	Maria-Magdalena Rusu; Simona Radiș	Romania	6:51.75	SF
2	Lisa Lötscher; Celia Dupre	Switzerland	6:59.23	SF
3	Ugnė Juzėnaitė; Kamilė Kralikaitė	Lithuania	7:03.76	SF
4	Taylor Caudle; Eleanor Price	Australia	7:09.32	SF
5	Clara Hornnaess; Frida Werner Foldager	Denmark	7:11.33	SF

=== Semifinals ===
The three fastest boats in each heat advanced to the Final A. The remaining boats were sent to Final B.

==== Semifinal 1 ====
Rank	Rower	Country	Time	Notes
1	Maria-Magdalena Rusu; Simona Radiș	Romania	6:58.53	FA
2	Laura Meriano; Alice Codato	Italy	7:04.59	FA
3	Elizabeth Witt; Jade Lindo	Great Britain	7:07.99	FA
4	Anna Šantrůčková; Pavlína Flamíková	Czech Republic	7:13.92	FB
5	Lisa Lötscher; Celia Dupre	Switzerland	7:14.68	FB
6	Clara Hornnaess; Frida Werner Foldager	Denmark	7:22.05	FB

==== Semifinal 2 ====
Rank	Rower	Country	Time	Notes
1	Emma Cornelis; Hezekia Peron	France	6:59.71	FA
2	Jessica Thoennes; Holly Drapp	United States	7:01.64	FA
3	Jovana Arsić; Elena Oriabinskaia	Serbia	7:05.72	FA
4	Melita Abraham; Antonia Abraham	Chile	7:06.26	FB
5	Ugnė Juzėnaitė; Kamilė Kralikaitė	Lithuania	7:16.46	FB
6	Taylor Caudle; Eleanor Price	Australia	7:25.47	FB

=== Finals ===
The A final determined the rankings for places 1 to 6. Additional rankings were determined in the other finals.

==== Final C ====
Rank	Rower	Country	Time	Total Rank
1	Aoife Casey; Emily Hegarty	Ireland	7:24.06	13
2	Marina Rubtsova; Valentina Plaksina	Individual Neutral Athletes	7:32.93	14
3	Sheung Yee Wong; King Wan Leung	Hong Kong	7:46.44	15

==== Final B ====
Rank	Rower	Country	Time	Total Rank
1	Melita Abraham; Antonia Abraham	Chile	7:25.83	7
2	Anna Šantrůčková; Pavlína Flamíková	Czech Republic	7:28.57	8
3	Lisa Lötscher; Celia Dupre	Switzerland	7:31.44	9
4	Ugnė Juzėnaitė; Kamilė Kralikaitė	Lithuania	7:37.98	10
5	Taylor Caudle; Eleanor Price	Australia	7:43.28	11
6	Clara Hornnaess; Frida Werner Foldager	Denmark	7:49.14	12

==== Final A ====
Rank	Rower	Country	Time	Total Rank
1st place, gold medalist(s)	Maria-Magdalena Rusu; Simona Radiș	Romania	7:08.52	1
2nd place, silver medalist(s)	Emma Cornelis; Hezekia Peron	France	7:13.31	2
3rd place, bronze medalist(s)	Jessica Thoennes; Holly Drapp	United States	7:13.93	3
4	Laura Meriano; Alice Codato	Italy	7:24.79	4
5	Jovana Arsić; Elena Oriabinskaia	Serbia	7:28.53	5
6	Elizabeth Witt; Jade Lindo	Great Britain	7:36.32	6
