= Azja Czajkowski =

American rower (born 2000)

Personal information
- Born: 16 June 2000 (age 26)
- Education: Stanford University

Sport
- Country: United States
- Sport: Rowing
- Club: San Diego Rowing Club
Medal record
Women's rowing
Representing United States
World Championships
| Gold medal – first place | 2025 Shanghai | Coxless four |
| Gold medal – first place | 2026 Amsterdam | Coxless four |
| Bronze medal – third place | 2026 Amsterdam | Mixed eight |

Azja Czajkowski (/ˈɑːʒə tʃaɪˈkaʊski/ AH-zhə chy-KOW-skee; born 16 June 2000) is an American rower. She competed at the 2024 Paris Olympics.

== Early life ==
She attended Rancho Buena Vista High School and Stanford University. In 2023, she was named the Collegiate Rowing Coaches Association (CRCA) Division I Athlete of the Year.

== Career ==
She is a member of San Diego Rowing Club. She won silver in the eight at the 2018 World Rowing Junior Championships.

She was an alternate at the 2023 World Rowing Championships. She qualified for the 2024 Summer Olympics in the coxless pair alongside Jessica Thoennes at the 2024 U.S. Olympic & Paralympic Team Trials in Sarasota, Florida with both rowers previously been part of the American eight boat.

She won a gold medal as part of the American coxless four at the 2025 World Rowing Championships in Shanghai, China, in September 2025.
