= Emma Cornelis =

French rower (born 1999)

Personal information
- Nationality: French
- Born: 7 May 1999 (age 27)

Sport
- Country: France
- Sport: Rowing
Medal record
Women's rowing
Representing France
World Championships
Silver medal – second place	2025 Shanghai	Coxless pair
Silver medal – second place	2026 Amsterdam	Coxless pair

Emma Cornelis (born 7 May 1999) is a French rower.

== Career ==
Cornelis won the 2024 Hambleden Pairs Challenge Cup.

She competed at the 2025 World Rowing Championships and won a silver medal in the coxless pair with a time of 7:13.31, along with Hézékia Péron. This was France's first medal in the event at the World Rowing Championships since Céline Garcia and Christine Gossé in 1995. She again competed at the 2026 World Rowing Championships and won a silver medal in the coxless pair with a time of 6:56.21.
