= Kaitlin Knifton =

American rower (born 2000)

Kate Knifton
Personal information
- Nationality: American
- Born: 5 July 2000 (age 26) Austin, TX
- Height: 6'0
- Weight: 160

Sport
- Country: United States
- Sport: Rowing
- Club: Texas Rowing Center
Medal record
World Championships
Gold medal – first place	2025 Shanghai	Coxless four
Gold medal – first place	2026 Amsterdam	Coxless four
Bronze medal – third place	2026 Amsterdam	Mixed eight

Kaitlin "Kate" Knifton (/ˈnɪftən/ NIF-tən; born July 5, 2000) is an American rower. She represented the United States at the 2024 Summer Olympics.
