= Esther Briz =

Spanish rower (born 2000)

Esther Briz Zamorano
Personal information
- Born: 31 January 2000 (age 26) Zaragoza, Spain
- Education: Stanford University

Sport
- Country: Spain
- Sport: Rowing
- Club: CN Helios
Medal record
Women's rowing
Representing Spain
European Championships
Bronze medal – third place	2023 Bled	Coxless pair

Esther Briz Zamorano (born 31 January 2000) is a Spanish rower. She competed at the 2024 Paris Olympics.

== Early life ==
From Zaragoza, she followed her older brother Pablo into competitive rowing. She attended Stanford University where she competed for the Stanford Cardinal rowing team at the NCAA Championships and graduated in 2022 with a degree in Management Sciences and Engineering.

== Career ==
She is a member of CN Helios. Alongside Ander Martin Domingo, she won gold at the 2021 World Rowing Coastal Championships, and the 2021 World Rowing Beach Sprint Finals in the Mixed Double. They won the Coastal Mixed Double Sculls at the 2022 World Rowing Coastal Championships & Beach Sprint Finals in Pembrokeshire, Wales. They also claimed the same title at the European level in San Sebastián in October 2022.

Alongside Aina Cid, she won a bronze medal in the coxless pairs at the 2023 European Rowing Championships in Bled, Slovenia.

She competed in the coxless pairs alongside Aina Cid at the 2024 Paris Olympics.

Briz was part of the victorious Oxford University crew at The Boat Race 2026.
