= Teal Cohen =

American rower (born 1999)

Personal information
- Born: 7 May 1999 (age 27) Dallas, TX
- Education: The University of Washington
- Height: 5 ft 10 in (178 cm)

Sport
- Country: United States
- Sport: Rowing
Medal record
Women's rowing
Representing United States
World Championships
Gold medal – first place	2025 Shanghai	Coxless four
Gold medal – first place	2026 Amsterdam	Coxless four
Bronze medal – third place	2026 Amsterdam	Mixed eight

Teal Cohen (born 7 May 1999) is an American rower. She competed at the 2024 Olympic Games and was a gold medalist at the 2025 World Rowing Championships as a member of the American coxless four.

== Biography ==
From Texas, she attended Hockaday School in Dallas. She started rowing when she was in high school. She studied at the University of Washington and won the NCAA Championship in the women's eight for Washington in 2019. She won the gold medal in the eight and the silver medal in the coxless four at the 2021 World Rowing U23 Championships. After graduating in political science and law in 2022, she began to train full time in Princeton, at the US Rowing Training Centre.

She competed in the women’s quadruple sculls at the 2024 Olympic Games and helped the team to a ninth place finish overall.

She won a gold medal as part of the American coxless four at the 2025 World Rowing Championships in Shanghai, China, in September 2025.
