= Jacqueline Swick =

Australian rower

Jacqui Swick
Personal information
- Full name: Jacqueline Swick
- Born: 31 May 2002 (age 24) Subiaco, Western Australia

Sport
- Country: Australia
- Sport: Rowing
Medal record
Women's rowing
Representing Australia
World Championships
Silver medal – second place	2026 Amsterdam	Coxless four
Bronze medal – third place	2023 Belgrade	W8+

Jacqueline (Jacqui) Swick (born 31 May 2002) is an Australian representative sweep-oar rower. She has represented at World Championships and won medals at World Rowing Cups, underage and senior World Championships. Jacqui rowed in the Australian Women's Eight at the 2024 Paris Olympic Games.

== Club and state rowing ==
Swick is a Western Australian and attended Presbyterian Ladies' College, Perth where she took up rowing. Her senior club rowing has been from the Swan River Rowing Club in Perth.

Swick first made state selection for Western Australia in youth eight selected to race at the 2020 Interstate Regatta, cancelled due to the COVID-19 pandemic. In 2021 she rowed in the West Australian youth eight to a victory at the Interstate Regatta.

Swick's senior state selection came in the 2022 women's senior eight which contested the Queen's Cup at the Interstate Regatta within the Australian Rowing Championships. She again raced in the West Australian Queen's Cup eight in the 2023 Interstate Regatta. Racing in Swan River colours she won the Australian championship title in the U23 coxless four at the 2022 Australian Rowing Championships.

== International representative rowing ==
Swick was selected in the Australian squad for the 2022 international season and the 2022 World Rowing Championships. She rowed in the four seat of the Australian women's eight at World Rowing Cups II and III taking bronze in Poznan and winning gold in Lucerne. She was then selected in Australia's U23 coxless four to row at the U23 World Rowing Championships in Varese. In that crew with Genevieve Hart, Paige Barr and Eliza Gaffney she won a bronze medal. At the 2022 World Rowing Championships at Racize, she was back in the Australian women's senior eight. They made the A final and finished in fifth place.

In 2023 she was again selected in the Australian senior women's sweep-oar squad for the 2023 international season. At the Rowing World Cup II in Varese Italy, Swick raced in the Australian women's eight. They led from the start in the A final and won the gold medal. At 2023's RWC III in Lucerne, the eight was unchanged. In the final they led through to the 1500m mark but finished in third place for the bronze medal. For the 2023 World Rowing Championships in Belgrade Serbia, the Australian women's eight was unchanged aside from some seat shifts in the bow end and Swick again raced in the six seat. They finished 2nd in their heat and then needed to proceed through a repechage which they won. In the A final they led through the first 1000m on a low rating of 37/38 but were rowed through by the high-rating Romanians and a fast finishing USA eight. The Australians won the bronze medal, a 3rd place world ranking and Paris 2024 qualification.

Jacqui was selected to the Australia Women's Eight for the 2024 Paris Olympic Games. The crew placed second in their Heat in the third fastest qualifying time (6:18.61) but booked a spot in the repechage two days later. They were third in the Rep, with the USA and Canada getting their bows in front but beating Italy and Denmark to secure their A Final spot. In the A Final, eventual winners Romania dominated the race and the Australian crew finished fourth - the best result for an Australian Women's Eight in Olympic history, and just 1.2 seconds back from Bronze medalists, Great Britain.
