= Natasha Morrice =

British rower

Personal information
- Born: 25 April 2000 (age 26)

Sport
- Sport: Rowing
- Club: Leander Club
Medal record
Women's rowing
Representing Great Britain
European Championships
Silver medal – second place	2023 Bled	Eight

Natasha Morrice (born 25 April 2000) is a British rower.

== Career ==
Morrice attended Guildford High School and Durham University, where she took up rowing with the university boat club. She was part of the British crew that won the silver medal in the women's eight at the 2023 European Rowing Championships in Bled.
