= Eliza Gaffney =

Australian rower (born 2000)

Personal information
- Nationality: Australian
- Born: 1 December 2000 (age 25)

Sport
- Country: Australia
- Sport: Rowing
Medal record
Women's rowing
Representing Australia

Eliza Gaffney (born 1 December 2000) is an Australian representative sweep-oar rower. She is a national champion, has represented at senior World Championships and was a medallist at U23 World Championships.

== Club and state rowing ==
Gaffney was raised in Melbourne and educated at the Ruyton Girls' School where she took up rowing. Her senior club rowing has been from the Melbourne University Boat Club.

Gaffney first made Victorian state selection in the 2021 Victorian's women's senior eight which contested and won the Queen's Cup at the Interstate Regatta. In 2022 she again raced in the Victorian Queen's Cup eight to victory.

In MUBC colours she has won a national title at the Australian Rowing Championships in 2021 - gold in the women's coxless four. She also won medals at the 2022 Australian Championships - silver in women's pair and bronze in the women's coxless four. At the 2023 Australian Rowing Championships she won the open coxless four national title in an all MUBC crew.

== International representative rowing ==
In March 2022 Gaffney was selected in the Australian senior training team to prepare for the 2022 international season and the 2022 World Rowing Championships. She raced in a coxless pair at the World Rowing Cup II in June 2022. She was then selected in Australia's U23 coxless four to row at the U23 World Rowing Championships in Varese. In that crew with Genevieve Hart, Jacqueline Swick and Paige Barr she won a bronze medal.

At the 2022 World Rowing Championships at Racize, Gaffney rowed Australia's coxless pair with Georgie Gleeson. They finished third in the B final for an overall ninth place finish at the regatta.
