= Kamilė Kralikaitė =

Lithuanian rower (born 2001)

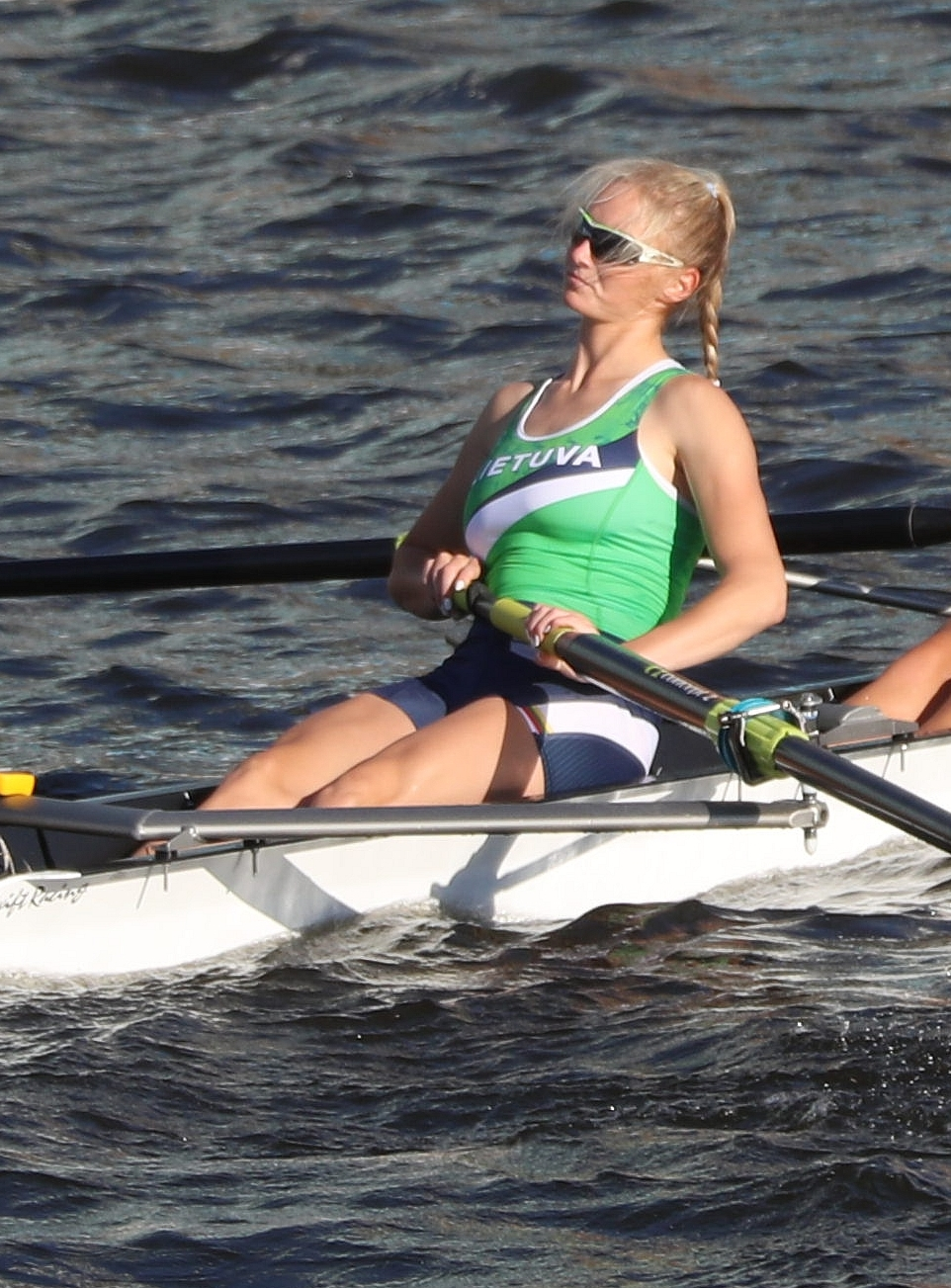

Personal information
- Nationality: Lithuanian
- Born: 29 June 2001 (age 25) Kaišiadorys, Lithuania

Sport
- Country: Lithuania
- Sport: Rowing
- Event: Coxless pair
- College team: Syracuse Orange (2020–2024)
Medal record
Women's rowing
Representing Lithuania
World U23 Championships
Gold medal – first place	2023 Plovdiv	Coxless pair
Silver medal – second place	2022 Varese	Coxless pair

Kamilė Kralikaitė (born 29 June 2001) is a Lithuanian rower. She was a finalist in the coxless pair at the 2024 Summer Olympics. She previously won the gold medal at the 2023 World Rowing U23 Championships, also in the women's coxless pair.

== Early and personal life ==
She is from the central Lithuanian city of Kaisiadorys, but attended Syracuse University in the United States, graduating with a B.A. in International Relations in 2024. At Syracuse, she was 2024 All-American, three-time All-ACC First Team selection and two-time All-ACC Academic Team honoree. She was a member of the Syracuse Orange women's rowing team that won their first-ever Atlantic Coast Conference Rowing Championship in 2024.

== Career ==
She was a silver medalist at the 2022 World Rowing U23 Championships in Varese, Italy in the coxless pair alongside Martyna Kazlauskaite. Alongside Kazlauskaite, she won the gold medal at the 2023 World Rowing U23 Championships in Plovdiv, Bulgaria.

Competimg alongside Ieva Adomaviciute, she finished in tenth place in the coxless pair at the 2023 World Rowing Championships in Belgrade, Serbia.

She qualified for her Olympic debut at the 2024 Olympic Games in Paris, France, in the women's coxless pair alongside Ieva Adomavičiūtė. They proceeded to move through the preliminary heats to qualify their boat for the final, after finishing third in their semi-final behind the Australian and American crews following a mini-battle for third place with the Chilean boat they triumphed with a time of 7:19.27. In the final, they finished in fifth place, the highest ever finish in the event in foe a Lithuanian pair. They covered the course in the final in 7:05.34, just .03 seconds behind the fourth place United States boat.
