= Rebecca Edwards (rower) =

Northern Irish rower

Rebecca Edwards BEM
Personal information
- Full name: Rebecca Elizabeth Sarah Edwards
- Born: 20 August 1993 (age 33) Aughnacloy, Northern Ireland
- Height: 178 cm (5 ft 10 in)

Sport
- Country: Great Britain
- Sport: Rowing
- Club: Leander Club
Medal record
Women's rowing
Representing Great Britain
European Championships
Silver medal – second place	2022 Oberschleißheim	Eight

Rebecca Elizabeth Sarah Edwards BEM (born 20 August 1993) is a Northern Irish rower who competes internationally for Great Britain.

== Rowing career ==
She was selected for the British team to compete in the rowing events, in the eight for the 2020 Summer Olympics.

Edwards was awarded the British Empire Medal (BEM) in the 2023 Birthday Honours for services to rowing.
