= Evangelia Anastasiadou =

Greek rower (born 2002)

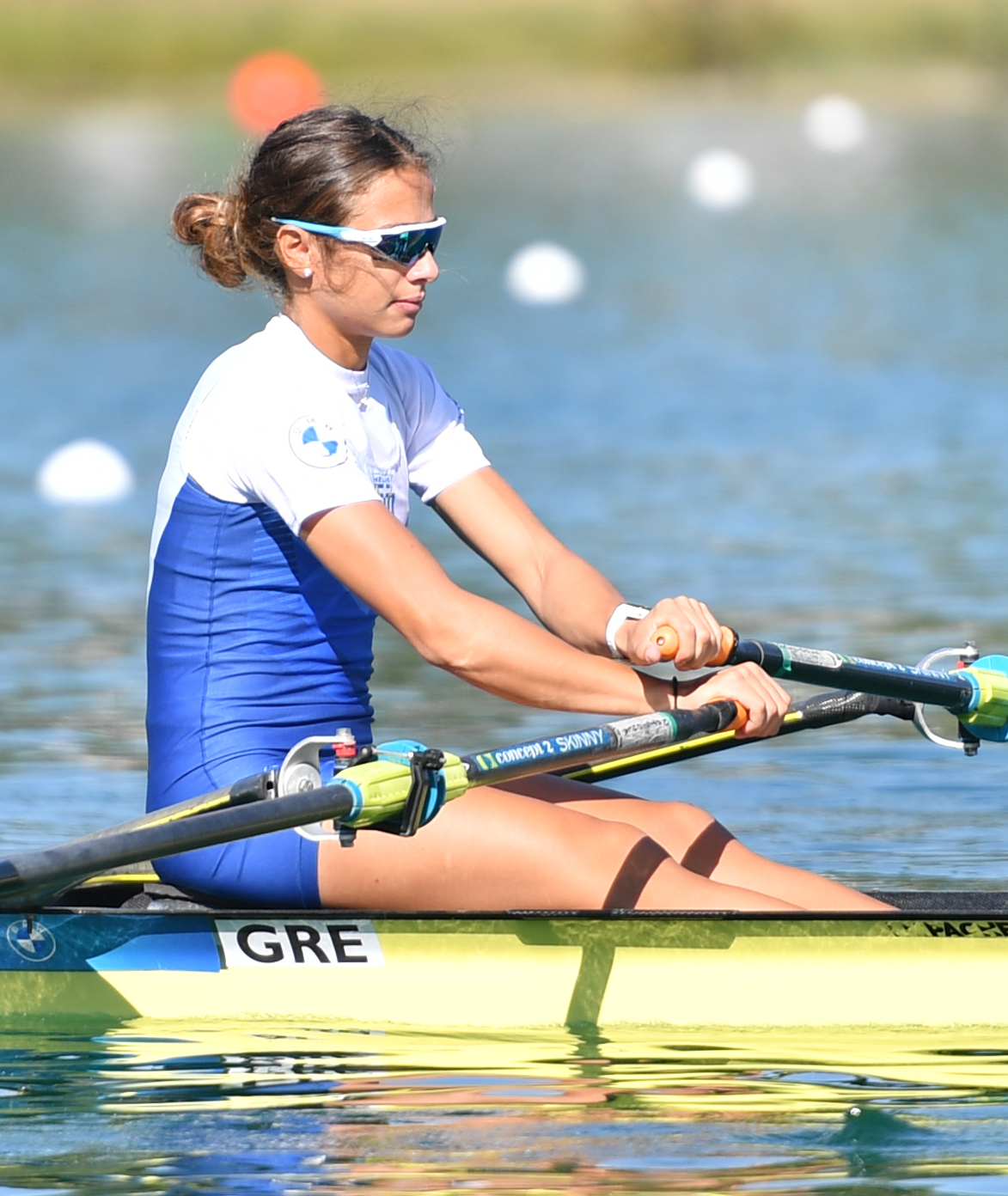

Personal information
- Born: 16 March 2002 (age 24) Kastoria, Greece
- Height: 1.65 m (5 ft 5 in)

Sport
- Country: Greece
- Sport: Rowing
- Events: Women's single sculls, Women's lightweight single sculls, Women's double sculls, Women's lightweight double sculls
Medal record
Women's rowing
Representing Greece
World U23 Championships
Gold medal – first place	2022 Varese	BLW1x
Gold medal – first place	2023 Plovdiv	BLW2x
Gold medal – first place	2024 St. Catharines	LW2x
Silver medal – second place	2021 Račice	BLW1x
European Championships
Silver medal – second place	2022 Oberschleißheim	W1x
Silver medal – second place	2023 Bled	LW1x
Silver medal – second place	2024 Szeged	Coxless pair
Silver medal – second place	2026 Varese	Double sculls
European U23 Championships
Gold medal – first place	2020 Duisburg	BLW1x
Gold medal – first place	2021 Kruszwica	BW2x
Gold medal – first place	2024 Edirne	BLW2x
Silver medal – second place	2022 Heindonk	BLW1x
Mediterranean Games
Gold medal – first place	2026 Taranto	W1x
Gold medal – first place	2026 Taranto	Mix2x

Evangelia Anastasiadou (Greek: Ευαγγελία Αναστασιάδου; born 16 March 2002) is a Greek rower. She won a silver medal in the single sculls at the 2022 European Rowing Championships.
