= Mary Mazzio-Manson =

American rower

Daisy Mazzio-Manson
Personal information
- Nationality: American
- Born: 1 February 1998 (age 27)

Sport
- Country: United States
- Sport: Rowing

Daisy Mazzio-Manson (/ˈmɑːzioʊ/ MAH-zee-oh; born February 1, 1998) is an American rower. She represented the United States at the 2024 Summer Olympics.
