= Jessica Thoennes =

American rower (born 1995)

Personal information
- Born: September 20, 1995 (age 30) Madison, Wisconsin, U.S.
- Height: 1.88 m (6 ft 2 in)

Sport
- Country: United States
- Sport: Rowing

Achievements and titles
- Olympic finals: Tokyo 2020 W8+[Rowing 2024 Summer Olympics- Women's Coxless Pair]
Medal record
Women's rowing
Representing the United States
World Championships
Silver medal – second place	2023 Belgrade	Eight
Bronze medal – third place	2025 Shanghai	Coxless pair

Jessica Thoennes (born September 20, 1995) is an American rower. She competed in the women's eight event at the 2020 Summer Olympics. She is openly bisexual.
