= Alina Hagstrom =

American rower

Personal information
- Nationality: American
- Born: September 27, 1996 (age 30) Seattle, Washington
- Education: Bishop Blanchet High School; Oregon State University
- Height: 5 ft 11 in (180 cm)

Sport
- Sport: rowing

Alina Hagstrom (born September 27, 1996) is an American rower. She has competed in the rowing World Championships, most notably winning the pair race in the World Rowing Under 23 Championships in 2018. She finished fourth in her race in the 2022 championships and second in 2023. She was an alternate for the USA Women's rowing team in the 2024 Summer Olympics.

== Rowing career ==
Hagstrom attended Bishop Blanchet High School, where she rowed on their rowing team, the Green Lake Crew. With Green Lake, Hagstrom went to the Henley Royal Regatta and the Henley Women's Regatta in England. Hagstrom and her crew also won a bronze medal in the 4+ at the US Rowing National Youth Championships in Sarasota, Florida. She played soccer and basketball in high school, too.

After graduating high school in 2015, Hagstrom went to Oregon State University. She majored in public health with minors in biology and chemistry and continued to compete in rowing. Hagstrom raced in the 5-seat at the Head of Oklahoma regatta and won gold in the 2015–16 season, and duplicated that feat in the 6-seat the following year. She became the fourth rower in OSU history to earn all-conference honors multiple times. Hagstrom graduated in 2019.

In July 2018, Hagstrom went to the Under 23 World Championships in Poznan, Poland. She won gold in the women's pair.

After graduating, Hagstrom continued to row. She finished fourth in the pair race at the 2023 US Rowing National Selection Regatta and fifth in the pair at the US Rowing Winter Speed Order.

In 2022, Hagstrom competed internationally for the first time since college. She placed fourth in the eight at the 2022 World Rowing Championships and second in the eight in 2023. Hagstrom finished eleventh in the single sculls in the 2024 World Rowing Cup II. She placed fourth in the quadruple sculls in the 2025 World Rowing Championships.

Hagstrom was an alternate for the American Women's Rowing Team in the Paris 2024 Summer Olympics.

== Personal life ==
Hagstrom was born on September 27, 1996 in Seattle, Washington to Keith and Mary Hagstrom. She has a brother John.

Hagstrom is openly LGBTQ.
