= 2023 World Rowing Championships =

International rowing event

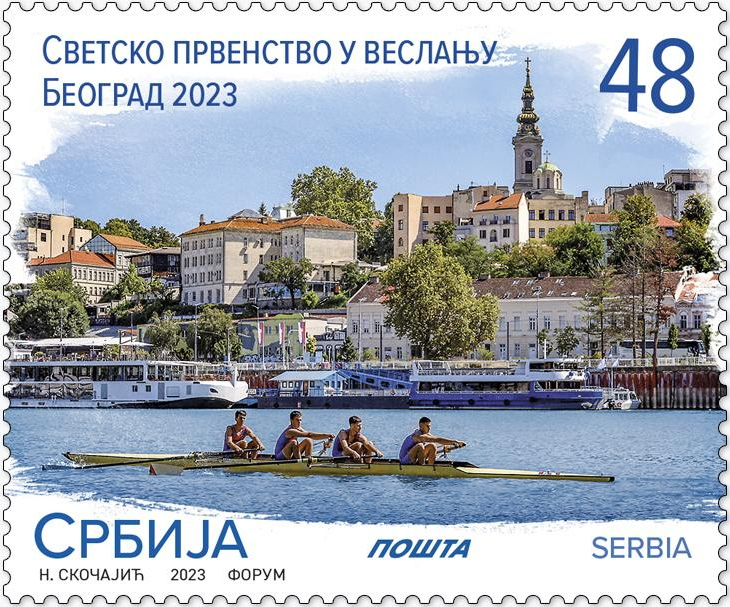
- Serbian stamp dedicated to the 2023 World Rowing Championships
- Venue: Lake Sava
- Location: Belgrade, Serbia
- Dates: 3–10 September

The 2023 World Rowing Championships were held from 3 to 10 September 2023 in Belgrade, Serbia.

== Medal summary ==
=== Medal table ===
* Host nation (Serbia)

Rank	Nation	Gold	Silver	Bronze	Total
1	Netherlands	6	3	0	9
2	Great Britain	6	1	2	9
3	Italy	3	4	1	8
4	Ukraine	3	0	1	4
5	Romania	2	1	2	5
6	Switzerland	2	1	0	3
7	Ireland	2	0	2	4
8	Germany	1	2	2	5
9	Australia	1	1	3	5
10	Norway	1	0	0	1
11	United States	0	5	2	7
12	New Zealand	0	1	2	3
13	China	0	1	1	2
13	France	0	1	1	2
15	Croatia	0	1	0	1
15	Hungary	0	1	0	1
15	Lithuania	0	1	0	1
15	Mexico	0	1	0	1
19	Poland	0	0	3	3
20	Moldova	0	0	1	1
Totals (20 entries)		27	25	23	75

Non-Olympic/Paralympic classes

=== Men ===
Event	Gold		Silver		Bronze	
Openweight events
M1x	Oliver Zeidler; Germany	6:38.08	Simon van Dorp; Netherlands	6:39.26	Thomas Mackintosh; New Zealand	6:40.33
M2x	Netherlands; Melvin Twellaar; Stef Broenink	6:09.19	Croatia; Martin Sinković; Valent Sinković	6:12.44	Ireland; Daire Lynch; Philip Doyle	6:13.41
M4x	Netherlands; Lennart van Lierop; Finn Florijn; Tone Wieten; Koen Metsemakers	5:52.33	Italy; Nicolò Carucci; Andrea Panizza; Luca Chiumento; Giacomo Gentili	5:54.58	Poland; Dominik Czaja; Fabian Barański; Mirosław Ziętarski; Mateusz Biskup	5:55.02
M2−	Switzerland; Roman Röösli; Andrin Gulich	6:51.09	Great Britain; Oliver Wynne-Griffith; Tom George	6:53.46	Ireland; Ross Corrigan; Nathan Timoney	6:54.22
M4−	Great Britain; Oliver Wilkes; David Ambler; Matt Aldridge; Freddie Davidson	6:04.35	United States; Justin Best; Nick Mead; Michael Grady; Liam Corrigan	6:06.37	New Zealand; Ollie Maclean; Logan Ullrich; Tom Murray; Matt Macdonald	6:08.44
M8+	Great Britain; Jacob Dawson; Morgan Bolding; Rory Gibbs; Sholto Carnegie; Charles Elwes; Thomas Digby; James Rudkin; Thomas Ford; Harry Brightmore	5:24.20	Netherlands; Guus Mollee; Olav Molenaar; Jan van Der Bij; Guillaume Krommenhoek; Sander de Graaf; Jacob van de Kerkhof; Gert-Jan van Doorn; Mick Makker; Dieuwke Fetter	5:25.23	Australia; Patrick Holt; Joshua Hicks; Ben Canham; Timothy Masters; James Daniel Robertson; Joseph O'Brien; Angus Dawson; Angus Widdicombe; Kendall Brodie	5:26.65
Lightweight events
LM1x	Andri Struzina; Switzerland	7:42.41	Niels Torre; Italy	7:44.90	Artur Mikołajczewski; Poland	7:47.72
LM2x	Ireland; Fintan McCarthy; Paul O'Donovan	6:32.09	Switzerland; Jan Schäuble; Raphaël Ahumada	6:34.38	Italy; Stefano Oppo; Gabriel Soares	6:34.77
LM4x	Italy; Luca Borgonovo; Nicolò Demiliani; Pietro Ruta; Matteo Tonelli	6:29.42	Germany; Max von Bülow; Simon Klueter; Fabio Kress; Joachim Agne	6:37.83	Not awarded	
LM2−	Italy; Francesco Bardelli; Stefano Pinsone	7:34.82	Hungary; Bence Szabó; Kálmán Furkó	7:40.23	Moldova; Dmitrii Zincenco; Nichita Naumciuc	7:57.24

=== Women ===
Event	Gold		Silver		Bronze	
Openweight events
W1x	Karolien Florijn; Netherlands	7:14.35	Emma Twigg; New Zealand	7:19.43	Tara Rigney; Australia	7:21.07
W2x	Romania; Ancuța Bodnar; Simona Radiș	6:46.94	Lithuania; Donata Karalienė; Dovilė Rimkutė	6:50.34	United States; Kristina Wagner; Sophia Vitas	6:50.45
W4x	Great Britain; Lauren Henry; Hannah Scott; Lola Anderson; Georgina Brayshaw	6:29.70	Netherlands; Roos de Jong; Tessa Dullemans; Laila Youssifou; Bente Paulis	6:30.37	China; Chen Yunxia; Zhang Ling; Lü Yang; Cui Xiaotong	6:35.05
W2−	Netherlands; Ymkje Clevering; Veronique Meester	7:20.52	Australia; Jessica Morrison; Annabelle McIntyre	7:22.90	Romania; Ioana Vrînceanu; Roxana Anghel	7:24.33
W4−	Netherlands; Marloes Oldenburg; Hermijntje Drenth; Tinka Offereins; Benthe Boonstra	6:41.82	Romania; Mădălina Bereș; Maria Tivodariu; Maria-Magdalena Rusu; Amalia Bereș	6:43.29	Great Britain; Heidi Long; Rowan McKellar; Helen Glover; Rebecca Shorten	6:44.31
W8+	Romania; Maria-Magdalena Rusu; Roxana Anghel; Adriana Adam; Iuliana Buhuș; Mădălina Bereș; Maria Tivodariu; Ioana Vrînceanu; Amalia Bereș; Victoria-Ștefania Petreanu	6:01.28	United States; Emily Froehlich; Margaret Hedeman; Jessica Thoennes; Regina Salmons; Alina Hagstrom; Brooke Mooney; Mary Mazzio-Manson; Charlotte Buck; Cristina Castagna	6:03.73	Australia; Paige Barr; Georgie Gleeson; Olympia Aldersey; Lily Alton-Triggs; Georgina Rowe; Jacqueline Swick; Molly Goodman; Bronwyn Cox; Hayley Verbunt	6:04.17
Lightweight events
LW1x	Siobhan McCrohan; Ireland	8:47.96	Kenia Lechuga; Mexico	8:51.57	Sophia Luwis; United States	8:52.48
LW2x	Great Britain; Emily Craig; Imogen Grant	7:19.23	United States; Michelle Sechser; Mary Jones	7:22.89	Romania; Mariana-Laura Dumitru; Ionela Cozmiuc	7:23.70
LW2−	Italy; Serena Mossi; Elisa Grisoni	8:33.13	Germany; Luise Münch; Eva Hohoff	8:40.64	Not awarded	

=== Pararowing ===
Event	Gold		Silver		Bronze	
PR1M1x	Roman Polianskyi; Ukraine	8:59.60	Giacomo Perini; Italy	9:04.40	Benjamin Pritchard; Great Britain	9:09.43
PR2M1x	Corné de Koning; Netherlands	9:48.32	Gian Filippo Mirabile; Italy	10:08.88	Paul Umbach; Germany	10:42.49
PR3M2−	Ukraine; Ivan Kupriichuk; Andrii Syvykh	8:30.78	Not awarded			
PR1W1x	Birgit Skarstein; Norway	10:05.91	Nathalie Benoit; France	10:07.70	Anna Sheremet; Ukraine	10:10.31
PR2W1x	Anna Aisanova; Ukraine	12:03.39	Not awarded			
PR2Mix2x	Great Britain; Lauren Rowles; Gregg Stevenson	8:45.67	China; Liu Shuang; Jiang Jijian	8:47.28	Poland; Jolanta Majka; Michał Gadowski	9:05.13
PR3Mix2x	Australia; Nikki Ayers; Jed Altschwager	8:07.07	United States; Gemma Wollenschlaeger; Todd Vogt	8:15.22	France; Elur Alberdi; Laurent Cadot	8:27.09
PR3Mix4+	Great Britain; Francesca Allen; Morgan Fice-Noyes; Giedrė Rakauskaitė; Edward Fuller; Erin Kennedy	7:22.20	United States; Skylar Dahl; Saige Harper; Alex Flynn; Benjamin Washburne; Emelie Eldracher	7:25.01	Germany; Susanne Lackner; Jan Helmich; Marc Lembeck; Kathrin Marchand; Inga Thoene	7:29.74
