= Aina Cid =

Spanish rower (born 1994)

Personal information
- Full name: Aina Cid i Centelles
- Born: 1 September 1994 (age 31)
- Home town: Amposta, Catalonia, Spain
- Height: 5 ft 7 in (170 cm)

Sport
- Country: Spain
- Sport: Rowing
- College team: Ohio State Buckeyes
Medal record
Women's rowing
Representing Spain
World Championships
Bronze medal – third place	2018 Plovdiv	Coxless pair
European Championships
Gold medal – first place	2019 Lucerne	Coxless pair
Silver medal – second place	2020 Poznan	Coxless pair
Bronze medal – third place	2021 Varese	Coxless pair
Bronze medal – third place	2023 Bled	Coxless pair

Aina Cid i Centelles (Note: In this Catalan name, the first or paternal surname is Cid and the second or maternal family name is Centelles; both are generally joined by the conjunction "i".) (born 1 September 1994) is a Spanish competitive rower.

She competed at the 2016 Summer Olympics in Rio de Janeiro, in the women's coxless pair. She also competed at the 2020 Summer Olympics and 2024 Summer Olympics.

Cid rowed for the Ohio State Buckeyes from 2014 to 2017, and helped the team to an NCAA national championship title in 2015. porky
