= Sweden at the 2022 European Championships =

in (Germany) Munich 11 August 2022 – 22 August 2022
- Competitors: 107 in 10 sports
- Medals Ranked 19th: Gold 3 Silver 2 Bronze 4 Total 9

European Championships appearances
- 2018; 2022

Sweden will compete at the 2022 European Championships in Munich from August 11 to August 22, 2022.

== Medallists ==
Medal	Name	Sport	Event	Date
Gold	Mattias Falck; Kristian Karlsson	Table tennis	Men's doubles	18 August
Gold	Armand Duplantis	Athletics	Men's pole vault	20 August
Gold	David Åhman; Jonatan Hellvig	Beach volleyball	Men's tournament	21 August
Silver	Thobias Montler	Athletics	Men's long jump	16 August
Silver	Perseus Karlström	Athletics	Men's 20 kilometres walk	20 August
Bronze	Jon Persson; Anton Källberg	Table tennis	Men's doubles	18 August
Bronze	Mattias Falck	Table tennis	Men's singles	20 August
Bronze	Kristian Karlsson	Table tennis	Men's singles	20 August
Bronze	Petter Menning	Canoe sprint	Men's K-1 200 m	21 August

== Competitors ==
The following is the list of number of competitors in the Championships:

Sport	Men	Women	Total
Athletics	27	25	52
Beach volleyball	2	0	2
Gymnastics (men and women)	5	4	9
Canoe sprint	8	7	15
Cycling road	2	3	5
Cycling track	1	0	1
Rowing	8	0	8
Sport climbing	2	0	2
Table tennis	5	4	9
Triathlon	2	2	4
Total	62	45	107

== Athletics ==
Sweden entered the following athletes.

Key

- Q = Qualified for the next round
- q = Qualified for the next round as a fastest loser or, in field events, by position without achieving the qualifying target
- NR = National record
- PB = Personal best
- SB = Season best
- N/A = Round not applicable for the event

=== Men ===
Track and road events

Athlete	Event	Heat		Semifinal		Final	
Athlete	Event	Result	Rank	Result	Rank	Result	Rank
Henrik Larsson	100 m	10.31	2 Q	10.28	6	Did not advance	
Andreas Kramer	800 m	1:46.50	5 q	1:48.37	1 Q	1:45.38	4
Samuel Pihlström	1500 m	3:40.70	8	—		Did not advance	
Andreas Almgren	5000 m	—				13:26.48 PB	4
Jonas Glans	5000 m	—				13:32.71	10
Archie Casteel	Marathon	—				2:17:44	31
Ebba Tulu Chala	Marathon	—				2:23:04	54
Jonas Leandersson	Marathon	—				2:16:54	28
Mustafa Mohamed	Marathon	—				2:19:52 SB	45
Linus Rosdal	Marathon	—				2:17:09 SB	29
Samuel Tsegay Tesfamariam	Marathon	—				DNF	–
Joel Bengtsson	110 m hurdles	13.84	2 Q	13.67	5	Did not advance	
Max Hrelja	110 m hurdles	13.80	7	Did not advance			
Carl Bengtström	400 m hurdles	Bye		49.52	4	Did not advance	
Emil Blomberg	3000 m steeplechase	8:35.22	8 q	—		8:33.09	10
Vidar Johansson	3000 m steeplechase	8:38.42	9	—		Did not advance	
Simon Sundström	3000 m steeplechase	8:50.30	12	—		Did not advance	
Perseus Karlström	20 km walk	—				1:19:23	2nd place, silver medalist(s)
Perseus Karlström	35 km walk	—				DNF	–

Field events

Athlete	Event	Qualification		Final	
Athlete	Event	Distance	Position	Distance	Position
Armand Duplantis	Pole vault	5.65	=6 q	6.06 CR	1st place, gold medalist(s)
Thobias Montler	Long jump	8.06	1 Q	8.06	2nd place, silver medalist(s)
Jesper Hellström	Triple jump	16.07	12 q	16.23 SB	10
Simon Pettersson	Discus throw	62.39	10 q	67.12	4
Daniel Ståhl	Discus throw	66.39	3 Q	66.39	5
Ragnar Carlsson	Hammer throw	74.65	10 q	74.00	9
Jakob Samuelsson	Javelin throw	70.39	23	Did not advance	

Combined events – Decathlon

Athlete	Event	100 m	LJ	SP	HJ	400 m	110H	DT	PV	JT	1500 m	Final	Rank
Marcus Nilsson	Result	11.39 SB	7.00 SB	15.69 SB	1.99 SB	49.77 SB	14.88	46.06	5.20 PB	66.69 PB	4:18.51 SB	8327 PB	4
Marcus Nilsson	Points	776	814	832	794	825	864	789	972	839	822	8327 PB	4
Fredrik Samuelsson	Result	11.17	6.91	14.18 SB	1.96 =SB	50.70	14.83 SB	41.38	4.80	63.53 SB	4:44.94 SB	7757	13
Fredrik Samuelsson	Points	823	792	739	767	783	870	693	849	791	650	7757	13

=== Women ===
Track and road events

Athlete	Event	Heat		Semifinal		Final	
Athlete	Event	Result	Rank	Result	Rank	Result	Rank
Julia Henriksson	200 m	23.62	6	Did not advance			
Lisa Lilja	200 m	23.20	4 Q	23.96	8	Did not advance	
Lovisa Lindh	800 m	2:03.48	5	Did not advance			
Hanna Hermansson	1500 m	4:07.08	3 Q	—		4:05.76 PB	7
Yolanda Ngarambe	1500 m	4:05.68 SB	9	—		Did not advance	
Sarah Lahti	5000 m	—				DNS	–
Sarah Lahti	10,000 m	—				32:42.27 SB	14
Camilla Elofsson	Marathon	—				2:45:34	44
Hanna Lindholm	Marathon	—				2:38:44	30
Sanna Mustonen	Marathon	—				2:43:23 SB	41
Emilia Lillemo	3000 m steeplechase	10:09.18	13	—		Did not advance	
Linn Söderholm	3000 m steeplechase	9:57.53	10	—		Did not advance	
Julia Henriksson; Daniella Busk; Filippa Sivnert; Elvira Tanderud	4 × 100 m relay	44.10	5	—		Did not advance	

Field events

Athlete	Event	Qualification		Final	
Athlete	Event	Distance	Position	Distance	Position
Maja Nilsson	High jump	1.83	=15	Did not advance	
Lisa Gunnarsson	Pole vault	4.10	24	Did not advance	
Khaddi Sagnia	Long jump	6.59	7 q	6.61	6
Maja Åskag	Triple jump	13.23	20	Did not advance	
Axelina Johansson	Shot put	17.97	6 q	18.04	7
Sara Lennman	Shot put	16.95	18	Did not advance	
Fanny Roos	Shot put	17.79	8 q	18.55	4
Vanessa Kamga	Discus throw	51.66	25	Did not advance	
Grete Ahlberg	Hammer throw	68.73	5 q	67.29	9

Combined events – Heptathlon

Athlete	Event	100H	HJ	SP	200 m	LJ	JT	800 m	Final	Rank
Bianca Salming	Result	14.37	1.86 SB	14.26	26.04	5.83 SB	50.15 SB	2:11.85 SB	6185 PB	8
Bianca Salming	Points	927	1054	811	794	798	863	938	6185 PB	8

== Beach Volleyball ==
Sweden has qualified 1 male pair.

Athlete	Event	Preliminary round			Round of 24	Round of 16	Quarterfinals	Semifinals	Final / BM	
Athlete	Event	Opposition Score	Opposition Score	Rank	Opposition Score	Opposition Score	Opposition Score	Opposition Score	Opposition Score	Rank
David Åhman; Jonatan Hellvig	Men's	Berntsen – Mol (NOR); W 2–0	Mol – Sørum (NOR); L 0–2	2 Q	Métral – Haussener (SUI); W 2–1	Cottafava – Nicolai (ITA); W 2–1	Herrera – Gavira (ESP); W 2–1	Mol – Sørum (NOR); W 2–1	Perušič – Schweiner (CZE); W 2–0	1st place, gold medalist(s)

== Gymnastics ==
Sweden has entered 5 men and 4 women.

=== Men ===
Qualification

Athlete	Event	Qualification								Final							
Athlete	Event	Apparatus						Total	Rank	Apparatus						Total	Rank
Athlete	Event	F	PH	R	V	PB	HB	Total	Rank	F	PH	R	V	PB	HB	Total	Rank
Karl Idesjö	Team															—	
Joakim Lenberg	Team															—	
David Rumbutis	Team															—	
William Sundell	Team															—	
Kim Vanström	Team															—	
Total	Team																

=== Women ===
Qualification

Athlete	Event	Qualification						Final					
Athlete	Event	Apparatus				Total	Rank	Apparatus				Total	Rank
Athlete	Event	V	UB	BB	F	Total	Rank	V	UB	BB	F	Total	Rank
Alva Eriksson	Team											—	
Tonya Paulsson	Team											—	
Emelie Westlund	Team											—	
Nathalie Westlund	Team											—	
Total	Team												

== Table tennis ==
Athlete	Event	Group play stage	Preliminary round 1	Preliminary round 2	Round of 64	Round of 32	Round of 16	Quarterfinals	Semifinals	Final / BM	
Athlete	Event	Opposition Result	Opposition Result	Opposition Result	Opposition Result	Opposition Result	Opposition Result	Opposition Result	Opposition Result	Opposition Result	Rank
Mattias Falck	Men's singles	BYE			Levenko (AUT)						
Kristian Karlsson	Men's singles	BYE			Kojic (CRO)						
Anton Källberg	Men's singles	BYE			Szudi (HUN)						
Truls Möregårdh	Men's singles	BYE			Lakatos (HUN)						
Jon Persson	Men's singles	BYE			Walker (ENG)						
Filippa Bergand	Women's singles	Zeqiri (KOS); W 3–0 Tomanovska (CZE); L 2–3 Mešetović (BIH); W 3–0	BYE	Jeger (CRO); L 1–3	did not advance						
Linda Bergström	Women's singles	BYE			Carlsen (NOR); W 4–0	Dragoman (ROU)					
Stina Källberg	Women's singles	BYE			Sevcikova (CZE); W 4–0	Han (GER)					
Rebecca Muskantor	Women's singles	Labosova (SVK); L 1–3 Carlsen (NOR); L 1–3	did not advance								
Mattias Falck; Kristian Karlsson	Men's doubles	—		BYE		Chen/Serdaroglu (AUT); W 3–1	Rasmussen/Andersen (DEN); W 3–1	Lambiet/Allegro (BEL); W 3–0	Källberg/Persson (SWE)		
Anton Källberg; Jon Persson	Men's doubles	—		BYE		Lebesson/Gauzy (FRA); W 3–2	Nuytinck/Dyjas (MIX); W 3–2	Kubik/Kulczycki (POL); W 3–2	Falck/Karlsson (SWE)		
Filippa Bergand; Rebecca Muskantor	Women's doubles	—		BYE		Solja/Sevcikova (MIX); W 3–1	Bergström/Källberg (SWE); L 1–3	did not advance			
Linda Bergström; Stina Källberg	Women's doubles	—		BYE		Todorovic/Surjan (SRB); W 3–0	Bergand/Muskantor (SWE); W 3–1	Ni/de Nutte (LUX)			
Kristian Karlsson; Stina Källberg	Mixed doubles	—		BYE		Kožul/Stražar (SLO); L 1–3	did not advance				
Truls Möregårdh; Linda Bergström	Mixed doubles	—		BYE	Libene/Avameri (EST); W 3–2	Qiu/Mittelham (GER); L 2–3	did not advance				

== Triathlon ==
Athlete	Event	Swim (1.5 km)	Trans 1	Bike (40 km)	Trans 2	Run (10 km)	Total Time	Rank
Andreas Carlsson	Men's	18:39	0:34	51:07	0:23	33:03	1:43:44	19
Gabriel Sandör	Men's	19:34	0:32	53:04	0:26	35:26	1:49:00	47
Marie Carlsson	Women's	20:52	0:36	58:54	0:32	did not finish		
Emma Varga	Women's	20:16	0:40	59:29	0:29	42:23	2:03:14	39

Relay

Athlete	Event	Swim (300 m)	Trans 1	Bike (6.8 km)	Trans 2	Run (2 km)	Total Group Time	Rank
Andreas Carlsson; Emma Varga; Gabriel Sandör; Marie Carlsson	Mixed relay	3:49; 0:06; 4:08; 4:08	0:43; 0:49; 0:41; 0:51	10:58; 12:19; 11:25; 12:49	0:25; 0:26; 0:23; 0:33	4:30; 5:43; 4:43; 6:59	1:30:32	16
