= Munich 2022 =

Munich 2022 may refer to:

- 2022 European Championships
- 2022 European Men's Artistic Gymnastics Championships
- 2022 European Women's Artistic Gymnastics Championships
- 2022 European Athletics Championships
- 2022 European Beach Volleyball Championships
- 2022 Canoe Sprint European Championships
- 2022 European Cycling Championships, see 2022 European Championships
- 2022 European Rowing Championships
- 2022 IFSC Climbing European Championships
- 2022 European Table Tennis Championships
- 2022 European Triathlon Championships
