= Italy at the 2022 European Championships =

in (Germany) Munich 11 August 2022 – 22 August 2022
- Competitors: 291 in 12 sports
- Medals Ranked 3rd: Gold 14 Silver 18 Bronze 19 Total 51

European Championships appearances
- 2018; 2022

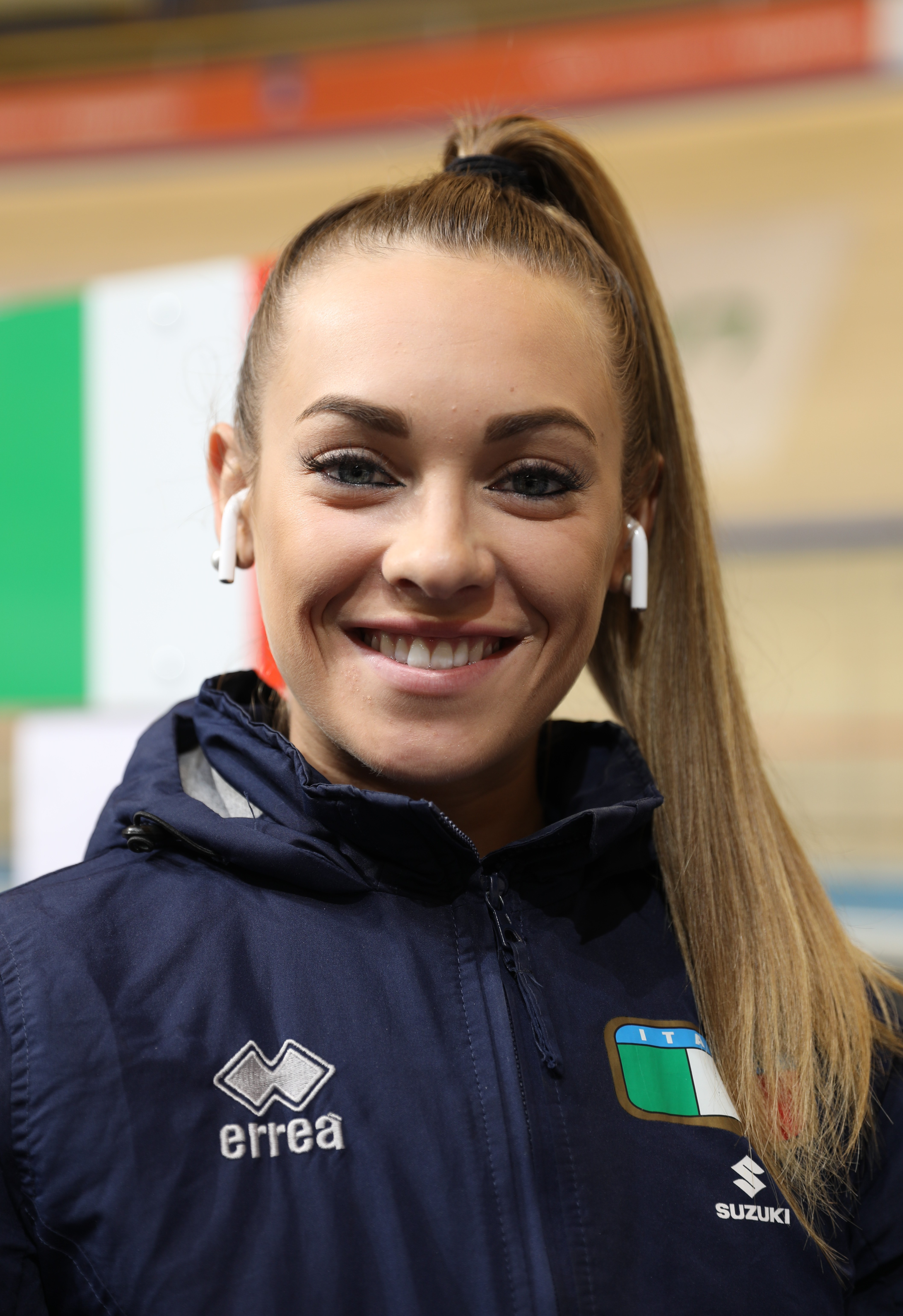
Letizia Paternoster, silver medal in team pursuit.

Italy competed at the 2022 European Championships in Munich from August 11 to August 22, 2022.

== Medallists ==
Medal	Name	Sport	Event	Date
Gold	Asia D'Amato	Gymnastics	Women's individual all-around	11 August
Gold	Giacomo Perini	Rowing	Men's PR1 single sculls	13 August
Gold	Antonio Vicino; Martino Goretti; Niels Torre; Patrick Rocek	Rowing	Men's lightweight quadruple sculls	13 August
Gold	Nicolò Carucci; Andrea Panizza; Luca Chiumento; Giacomo Gentili	Rowing	Men's quadruple sculls	13 August
Gold	Angela Andreoli; Alice D'Amato; Asia D'Amato; Martina Maggio; Giorgia Villa	Gymnastics	Women's team all-around	13 August
Gold	Giulia Mignemi; Paola Piazzolla; Silvia Crosio; Arianna Noseda	Rowing	Women's lightweight quadruple sculls	14 August
Gold	Elia Viviani	Cycling track	Men's elimination race	14 August
Gold	Rachele Barbieri	Cycling track	Women's omnium	15 August
Gold	Silvia Zanardi; Rachele Barbieri	Cycling track	Women's madison	16 August
Gold	Marcell Jacobs	Athletics	Men's 100 metres	16 August
Gold	Gianmarco Tamberi	Athletics	Men's high jump	18 August
Gold	Manfredi Rizza; Andrea di Liberto	Canoeing	Men's K–2 200 metres	20 August
Gold	Federico Mancarella	Canoeing	Men's KL2 200 metres	21 August
Gold	Yemaneberhan Crippa	Athletics	Men's 10,000 metres	21 August
Silver	Rachele Barbieri; Vittoria Guazzini; Letizia Paternoster; Silvia Zanardi; Martina Fidanza (Note: She ran preliminary round.)	Cycling track	Women's team pursuit	12 August
Silver	Davide Plebani	Cycling track	Men's individual pursuit	13 August
Silver	Gabriel Soares	Rowing	Men's lightweight single sculls	14 August
Silver	Pietro Ruta; Stefano Oppo	Rowing	Men's lightweight double sculls	14 August
Silver	Asia D'Amato	Gymnastics	Women's vault	14 August
Silver	Alice D'Amato	Gymnastics	Women's uneven bars	14 August
Silver	Martina Maggio	Gymnastics	Women's floor exercise	14 August
Silver	Silvia Zanardi	Cycling track	Women's points race	14 August
Silver	Matteo Bianchi	Cycling track	Men's 1 km time trial	15 August
Silver	Simone Consonni	Cycling track	Men's omnium	15 August
Silver	Andrea Dallavalle	Athletics	Men's triple jump	17 August
Silver	Nicolae Craciun; Daniele Santini	Canoeing	Men's C–2 1000 metres	19 August
Silver	Ahmed Abdelwahed	Athletics	Men's 3000 metres steeplechase	19 August
Silver	Yumin Abbadini; Nicola Bartolini; Lorenzo Minh Casali; Andrea Cingolani; Matteo Levantesi	Gymnastics	Men's team all-around	20 August
Silver	Eleonora De Paolis	Canoeing	Women's KL1 200 metres	21 August
Silver	Esteban Farias	Canoeing	Men's KL1 200 metres	21 August
Silver	Elisa Balsamo	Cycling road	Women's road race	21 August
Silver	Susanna Cicali	Canoeing	Women's K-1 5000 metres	21 August
Bronze	Martina Maggio	Gymnastics	Women's individual all-around	11 August
Bronze	Kiri Tontodonati; Stefania Gobbi	Rowing	Women's double sculls	13 August
Bronze	Vincenzo Abbagnale; Cesare Gabbia; Emanuele Gaetani Liseo; Matteo Lodo; Marco Di Costanzo; Matteo Castaldo; Giuseppe Vicino; Leonardo Pietra Caprina; Enrico D'Aniello	Rowing	Men's eight	13 August
Bronze	Miriam Vece	Cycling track	Women's 500 m time trial	13 August
Bronze	Vittoria Guazzini	Cycling track	Women's individual pursuit	13 August
Bronze	Manlio Moro	Cycling track	Men's individual pursuit	13 August
Bronze	Valentina Rodini; Federica Cesarini	Rowing	Women's lightweight double sculls	14 August
Bronze	Angela Andreoli	Gymnastics	Women's floor exercise	14 August
Bronze	Matteo Giupponi	Athletics	Men's 35 kilometres walk	16 August
Bronze	Yemaneberhan Crippa	Athletics	Men's 5000 metres	16 August
Bronze	Filippo Ganna	Cycling road	Men's time trial	17 August
Bronze	Sara Fantini	Athletics	Women's hammer throw	17 August
Bronze	Osama Zoghlami	Athletics	Men's 3000 metres steeplechase	19 August
Bronze	Filippo Tortu	Athletics	Men's 200 metres	19 August
Bronze	Carlo Tacchini	Canoeing	Men's C–1 1000 metres	20 August
Bronze	Carlo Tacchini	Canoeing	Men's C–1 5000 metres	20 August
Bronze	Samuele Burgo; Andrea Schera	Canoeing	Men's K–2 1000 metres	21 August\
Bronze	Zaynab Dosso; Gloria Hooper; Anna Bongiorni; Alessia Pavese; Dalia Kaddari	Athletics	Women's 4 × 400 metres relay	21 August
Bronze	Rachele Barbieri	Cycling road	Women's road race	21 August

== Competitors ==
Italy enrolled 244 athletes (136 men and 108 women) in the seven sports of this edition of the European Championships.

Sport	Men	Women	Total
Athletics	53	45	98
Beach volleyball	8	6	14
Gymnastics (men and women)	5	5	10
Canoe sprint	20	7	27
Cycling BMX	2	0	2
Cycling mountain bike	3	3	6
Cycling road	9	9	18
Cycling track	14	7	21
Rowing	33	25	58
Sport climbing	9	11	20
Table tennis	3	4	7
Triathlon	5	5	10
Total	164	127	291

== Beach Volleyball ==
Italy qualified 4 male and 3 female pairs.

=== Men ===
Athlete	Event	Preliminary round			Round of 24	Round of 16	Quarterfinals	Semifinals	Final / BM	
Athlete	Event	Opposition Score	Opposition Score	Rank	Opposition Score	Opposition Score	Opposition Score	Opposition Score	Opposition Score	Rank
Davide Benzi; Carlo Bonifazi	Men's	Carambula – Rossi (ITA)								
Adrian Carambula; Enrico Rossi	Men's	Benzi – Bonifazi (ITA)								
Daniele Lupo; Alex Ranghieri	Men's	Krattiger – Breer (SUI)								
Paolo Nicolai; Samuele Cottafava	Men's	Šépka – Semerád (CZE)								

=== Women ===
Athlete	Event	Preliminary round			Round of 24	Round of 16	Quarterfinals	Semifinals	Final / BM	
Athlete	Event	Opposition Score	Opposition Score	Rank	Opposition Score	Opposition Score	Opposition Score	Opposition Score	Opposition Score	Rank
Marta Menegatti; Valentina Gottardi	Women's	Orsi Toth – Orsi Toth (ITA)								
Reka Orsi Toth; Viktoria Orsi Toth	Women's	Menegatti – Gottardi (ITA)								
Claudia Scampoli; Margherita Bianchin	Women's	Kotnik – Lovsin (SLO)								

== Cycling ==
=== Road ===
Men

Athlete	Event	Time	Rank
Filippo Baroncini	Road race	4:39:12	57
Mattia Cattaneo	Time trial	28:47.40	14
Alberto Dainese	Road race	4:38:49	11
Filippo Ganna	Road race	4:39:14	61
Filippo Ganna	Time trial	27:14.00	3rd place, bronze medalist(s)
Jacopo Guarnieri	Road race	4:39:18	66
Jonathan Milan	Road race	4:40:34	87
Luca Mozzato	Road race	4:45:27	117
Matteo Trentin	Road race	4:39:18	64
Elia Viviani	Road race	4:38:49	7

Women

Athlete	Event	Time	Rank
Arianna Fidanza	Time trial	33:54.93	21
Alessia Vigilia	Time trial	33:23.32	14

== Gymnastics ==
Italy has entered five male and five female athletes.

=== Men ===
Qualification

Athlete	Event	Qualification								Final							
Athlete	Event	Apparatus						Total	Rank	Apparatus						Total	Rank
Athlete	Event	F	PH	R	V	PB	HB	Total	Rank	F	PH	R	V	PB	HB	Total	Rank
Nicola Bartolini	Team															—N/a	
Lorenzo Minh Casali	Team															—N/a	
Ludovico Edalli	Team															—N/a	
Matteo Levantesi	Team															—N/a	
Marco Lodadio	Team															—N/a	
Total	Team																

=== Women ===
Qualification

Athlete	Event	Qualification						Final					
Athlete	Event	Apparatus				Total	Rank	Apparatus				Total	Rank
Athlete	Event	V	UB	BB	F	Total	Rank	V	UB	BB	F	Total	Rank
Angela Andreoli	Team											—N/a	
Alice D'Amato	Team											—N/a	
Asia D'Amato	Team											—N/a	
Martina Maggio	Team											—N/a	
Giorgia Villa	Team											—N/a	
Total	Team												

== Triathlon ==
=== Men ===
Athlete	Event	Swim (1.5 km)	Trans 1	Bike (40 km)	Trans 2	Run (10 km)	Total Time	Rank
Nicola Azzano	Men's							
Gianluca Pozzatti	Men's							
Michele Sarzilla	Men's							

=== Women ===
Athlete	Event	Swim (1.5 km)	Trans 1	Bike (40 km)	Trans 2	Run (10 km)	Total Time	Rank
Luisa Iogna-Prat	Women's							
Bianca Seregni	Women's							
Verena Steinhauser	Women's							
Ilaria Zane	Women's							

=== Mixed ===
Athlete	Event	Swim (300 m)	Trans 1	Bike (6.8 km)	Trans 2	Run (2 km)	Total Group Time	Rank
	Mixed relay							
