= Cyprus at the 2022 European Championships =

in (Germany) Munich 11 August 2022 – 22 August 2022
- Competitors: 16 in 4 sports
- Medals Ranked 30th: Gold 1 Silver 0 Bronze 0 Total 1

European Championships appearances
- 2018; 2022

Cyprus competed at the 2022 European Championships in Munich from August 11 to August 22, 2022.

== Medallists ==
Medal	Name	Sport	Event	Date
Gold	Marios Georgiou	Artistic gymnastics	Men's horizontal bar	21 August

== Competitors ==
The following is the list of number of competitors in the Championships:

Sport	Men	Women	Total
Artistic gymnastics (men and women)	5	1	6
Athletics	3	4	7
Canoe sprint	1	0	1
Table tennis	1	1	2
Total	10	6	16

== Athletics ==
Cyprus entered the following athletes.

Key

- Q = Qualified for the next round
- q = Qualified for the next round as a fastest loser or, in field events, by position without achieving the qualifying target
- NR = National record
- PB = Personal best
- SB = Season best
- N/A = Round not applicable for the event

Men
Track and road

Athletes	Event	Heats		Semifinal		Final	
Athletes	Event	Result	Rank	Result	Rank	Result	Rank
Milan Trajkovic	110 metres hurdles	Bye		13.54	9	did not advance	

Field events

Athletes	Event	Qualification		Final	
Athletes	Event	Distance	Position	Distance	Position
Apostolos Parellis	Discus throw	61.95	11 q	63.32	8
Alexandros Poursanidis	Hammer throw	70.56	21	did not advance	

Women
Track and road

Athletes	Event	Heats		Semifinal		Final	
Athletes	Event	Result	Rank	Result	Rank	Result	Rank
Natalia Christofi	100 metres hurdles	13.53	18	did not advance			
Olivia Fotopoulou	100 metres	11.62	20	did not advance			
Olivia Fotopoulou	200 metres	23.40	15 Q	23.33	12	did not advance	

Field events

Athletes	Event	Qualification		Final	
Athletes	Event	Distance	Position	Distance	Position
Filippa Fotopoulou	Long jump	6.54	11 q	6.26	12
Androniki Lada	Discus throw	52.80	24	did not advance	

== Canoeing ==
Men

Athlete	Event	Heats		Semifinals		Final	
Athlete	Event	Time	Rank	Time	Rank	Time	Rank
Andreas Potamitis	KL1 200m	—				1:12.069	9

== Gymnastics ==
Cyprus has entered five male and five female athletes.

=== Men ===
Qualification

Athlete	Event	Qualification								Final							
Athlete	Event	Apparatus						Total	Rank	Apparatus						Total	Rank
Athlete	Event	F	PH	R	V	PB	HB	Total	Rank	F	PH	R	V	PB	HB	Total	Rank
Georgios Angonas	Team	12.666	12.000	12.166	13.200	13.666	13.233	76.931	44	Did not advance							
Michalis Chari	Team	13.133	11.066	12.133	13.900	12.700	12.133	75.065	53	Did not advance							
Marios Georgiou	Team	13.533	12.033	0.000	—		14.233 Q	—		Did not advance							
Ilias Georgiou	Team	—	DNS	—			DNS	—		Did not advance							
Sokratis Pilakouris	Team	11.700	—	13.933	12.933	11.200	—			Did not advance							
Total	Team	39.332	35.099	38.232	40.033	37.566	39.599	229.861	20	Did not advance							

Individual finals

Athlete	Event	Apparatus						Total	Rank
Athlete	Event	F	PH	R	V	PB	HB	Total	Rank
Marios Georgiou	Horizontal bar	—				14.400	—	14.400	1st place, gold medalist(s)

=== Women ===
Qualification

Athlete	Qualification					
Athlete	Apparatus				Total	Rank
Athlete	V	UB	BB	F	Total	Rank
Tatiana Bachurina	11.666	11.000	11.766	11.100	45.532	61

== Table tennis ==
Cyprus entered 1 man and 1 woman.

=== Men ===
Athlete	Event	Qualification stage				Preliminary Round 1	Preliminary Round 2	Round of 64	Round of 32	Round of 16	Quarterfinals	Semifinals	Final / BM	
Athlete	Event	Opposition Score	Opposition Score	Opposition Score	Rank	Opposition Score	Opposition Score	Opposition Score	Opposition Score	Opposition Score	Opposition Score	Opposition Score	Opposition Score	Rank
Marios Yiangou	Singles	Lambiet (BEL); L 0–3	Konstantinopoulos (GRE); W 3–0	Pištej (SVK); W 3–1	2 Q	Haug (NOR); L 2–3	Did not advance							73
Marios Yiangou; Michael Tauber (ISR)	Doubles	—				Bye	Kubik / Kulczycki (POL); L 0–3	Did not advance						33

=== Women ===
Athlete	Event	Qualification stage				Preliminary Round 1	Preliminary Round 2	Round of 64	Round of 32	Round of 16	Quarterfinals	Semifinals	Final / BM	
Athlete	Event	Opposition Score	Opposition Score	Opposition Score	Rank	Opposition Score	Opposition Score	Opposition Score	Opposition Score	Opposition Score	Opposition Score	Opposition Score	Opposition Score	Rank
Foteini Meletie	Singles	Tofant (SLO); L 0–3	Puchovanová (SVK); L 0–3	—	3	Did not advance								
Foteini Meletie; Harisa Mešetović (BIH)	Doubles	—				Bye	Yovkova / Trifonova (BUL); L 0–3	Did not advance						33

=== Mixed ===
Athlete	Event	Preliminary Round 1	Preliminary Round 2	Round of 32	Round of 16	Quarterfinals	Semifinals	Final / BM	
Athlete	Event	Opposition Score	Opposition Score	Opposition Score	Opposition Score	Opposition Score	Opposition Score	Opposition Score	Rank
Marios Yiangou; Foteini Meletie	Doubles	Navickas / Riliskyte (LTU); W 3–0	Limonov / Brateyko (UKR); L 0–3	Did not advance					33
