= Hungary at the 2022 European Championships =

in (Germany) Munich 11 August 2022 – 22 August 2022
- Competitors: 142 in 10 sports
- Medals Ranked 5th: Gold 11 Silver 7 Bronze 5 Total 23

European Championships appearances
- 2018; 2022

Hungary will compete at the 2022 European Championships in Munich from August 11 to August 22, 2022.

== Medallists ==
Medal	Name	Sport	Event	Date
Gold	Bence Szabó; Kálmán Furkó	Rowing	Men's lightweight coxless pair	14 August
Gold	Zsófia Kovács	Gymnastics	Women's vault	14 August
Gold	Emese Kőhalmi; Eszter Rendessy	Canoeing	Women's K–2 1000 metres	19 August
Gold	Tamás Juhász	Canoeing	Men's VL2 200 metres	19 August
Gold	Bálint Kopasz	Canoeing	Men's K–1 1000 metres	20 August
Gold	Péter Pál Kiss	Canoeing	Men's KL1 200 metres	21 August
Gold	Noémi Pupp	Canoeing	Women's K–1 1000 metres	21 August
Gold	Giada Bragato; Bianka Nagy	Canoeing	Women's C–2 200 metres	21 August
Gold	Blanka Kiss; Anna Lucz	Canoeing	Women's K–2 200 metres	21 August
Gold	Bálint Kopasz; Bence Nádas	Canoeing	Men's K–2 500 metres	21 August
Gold	Emese Kőhalmi	Canoeing	Women's K–1 5000 metres	21 August
Silver	Bence Halász	Athletics	Men's hammer throw	18 August
Silver	Ádám Varga	Canoeing	Men's K–1 500 metres	19 August
Silver	Giada Bragato; Bianka Nagy	Canoeing	Women's C–2 500 metres	20 August
Silver	Balázs Adolf	Canoeing	Men's C–1 5000 metres	20 August
Silver	Eszter Rendessy	Canoeing	Women's K–1 500 metres	21 August
Silver	Krisztofer Mészáros	Gymnastics	Men's floor	21 August
Silver	Luca Kozák	Athletics	Women's 100 metres hurdles	21 August
Bronze	Viktória Madarász	Athletics	Women's 35 kilometres walk	16 August
Bronze	Mark Miszer; Kornel Beke; Csaba Erdőssy; Tamás Erdélyi	Canoeing	Men's K–4 1000 metres	19 August
Bronze	Bálazs Adolf; Dániel Fejes	Canoeing	Men's C–2 1000 metres	19 August
Bronze	Katalin Varga	Canoeing	Women's KL2 200 metres	21 August
Bronze	Blanka Kiss; Anna Lucz; Zsóka Csikós; Alida Dóra Gazsó	Canoeing	Women's K–4 1000 metres	21 August

== Competitors ==
The following is the list of number of competitors in the Championships:

Sport	Men	Women	Total
Athletics	21	25	46
Gymnastics (men and women)	5	5	10
Canoe sprint	25	16	43
Cycling BMX	2	0	2
Cycling road	2	0	2
Cycling track	4	4	8
Rowing	11	2	13
Sport climbing	1	0	1
Table tennis	5	4	9
Triathlon	4	4	8
Total	82	60	142

== Athletics ==
Hungary entered the following athletes.

Key

- Q = Qualified for the next round
- q = Qualified for the next round as a fastest loser or, in field events, by position without achieving the qualifying target
- NR = National record
- PB = Personal best
- SB = Season best
- N/A = Round not applicable for the event

=== Men ===
Track and road events

Athlete	Event	Heat		Semifinal		Final	
Athlete	Event	Result	Rank	Result	Rank	Result	Rank
Tamás Máté	200 metres	20.94	17	did not advance			
Dániel Huller	800 metres	1:47.19	6 q	1:48.03	8	did not advance	
István Szögi	1500 metres	3:44.20	23	—N/a		did not advance	
Gáspár Csere	Marathon	—N/a				2:18:35 SB	36
Dániel Eszes	110 metres hurdles	14.25	24	did not advance			
Bálint Szeles	110 metres hurdles	13.97	20	did not advance			
Valdó Szűcs	110 metres hurdles	13.73	6 Q	13.78	18	did not advance	
István Palkovits	3000 metres steeplechase	8:40.47	20	—N/a		did not advance	
Máté Helebrandt	35 kilometres walk	—N/a				DQ	
Bence Venyercsán	35 kilometres walk	—N/a				2:41:07 SB	14
Dániel Ajide; Tamás Máté; Zoltán Wahl; Attila Molnár	4 × 400 metres relay	3:04.71	13	—N/a		did not advance	

Field events

Athlete	Event	Qualification		Final	
Athlete	Event	Distance	Position	Distance	Position
Péter Bakosi	High jump	2.12	=19	did not advance	
Tibor Galambos	Triple jump	NM		did not advance	
János Huszák	Discus throw	59.99	20	did not advance	
Róbert Szikszai	Discus throw	61.32	13	did not advance	
Bence Halász	Hammer throw	77.72	4 Q	80.92 PB	2nd place, silver medalist(s)
Krisztián Pars	Hammer throw	NM		did not advance	
Dániel Rába	Hammer throw	71.59	14	did not advance	

=== Women ===
Track and road events

Athlete	Event	Heat		Semifinal		Final	
Athlete	Event	Result	Rank	Result	Rank	Result	Rank
Boglárka Takács	100 metres	11.44	=6 Q	11.49	16	did not advance	
Bianka Bartha-Kéri	800 metres	2:02.99	14	did not advance			
Viktória Wagner-Gyürkés	5000 metres	—N/a				15:16.11 PB	9
Zsófia Erdélyi	Marathon	—N/a				2:48:03	48
Nóra Szabó	Marathon	—N/a				2:34:49 SB	17
Luca Kozák	100 metres hurdles	Bye		12.69 NR	3	12.69 =NR	2nd place, silver medalist(s)
Janka Molnár	400 metres hurdles	57.38	19	did not advance			
Lili Anna Tóth	3000 metres steeplechase	10:08.18 SB	25	—N/a		did not advance	
Barbara Oláh	20 kilometres walk	—N/a				1:38:31	16
Viktória Madarász	35 kilometres walk	—N/a				2:49:58 PB	3rd place, bronze medalist(s)
Rita Récsei	35 kilometres walk	—N/a				3:04:49	13
Anna Luca Kocsis; Jusztina Csóti; Boglárka Takács; Anna Tóth	4 × 100 metres relay	44.19 SB	11	—N/a		did not advance	
Evelin Nádházy; Bianka Bartha-Kéri; Fanni Rapai; Janka Molnár	4 × 400 metres relay	3:29.39 SB	10	—N/a		did not advance	

Field events

Athlete	Event	Qualification		Final	
Athlete	Event	Distance	Position	Distance	Position
Barbara Szabó	High jump	1.78	=19	did not advance	
Hanga Klekner	Pole vault	4.25	=18	did not advance	
Diána Lesti	Long jump	6.29	17	did not advance	
Réka Gyurátz	Hammer throw	68.63	6 q	69.02	7
Réka Szilágyi	Javelin throw	57.40	12 q	60.57 SB	4

Combined events – Heptathlon

Athlete	Event	100H	HJ	SP	200 m	LJ	JT	800 m	Final	Rank
Xénia Krizsán	Result	13.77	1.77 SB	14.02	24.74	6.15	50.38 SB	2:10.90 SB	6372 SB	5
Xénia Krizsán	Points	1011	941	795	911	896	867	951	6372 SB	5

== Cycling ==
=== Road ===
Men

Athlete	Event	Time	Rank
Márton Dina	Road race	4:39:35	77
Márton Dina	Time trial	30:29.10	29
Barnabás Peák	Road race	4:39:14	58
Barnabás Peák	Time trial	28:59.24	19

=== Track ===
Elimination race

Athlete	Event	Final
Athlete	Event	Rank
Gergő Orosz	Men's elimination race	16

Keirin

Athlete	Event	1st Round	Repechage	Semifinal	Final
Athlete	Event	Rank	Rank	Rank	Rank
Bálint Csengői	Men's keirin	DNF R	4	Did not advance	
Sándor Szalontay	Men's keirin	2 R	1 SF	6 F7-12	11

Omnium

Athlete	Event	Qualification		Scratch Race		Tempo Race		Elimination Race		Points Race		Total points	Rank
Athlete	Event	Rank	Points	Rank	Points	Rank	Points	Rank	Points	Rank	Points	Total points	Rank
Bertold Drijver	Men's omnium	19	-20	Did not advance									
Johanna Kitti Borissza	Women's omnium	—N/a		=18	6	20	2	18	6	Did not finish			

Points race

Athlete	Event	Final	
Athlete	Event	Points	Rank
Bertold Drijver	Men's points race	20	11
Johanna Kitti Borissza	Women's points race	Did not finish	

Scratch

Athlete	Event	Final	
Athlete	Event	Laps down	Rank
Gergő Orosz	Men's scratch	Did not finish	
Johanna Kitti Borissza	Women's scratch	0	18

Sprint

Athlete	Event	Qualification		Round 1	Round 2	Quarterfinals	Semifinals	Final	
Athlete	Event	Time Speed (km/h)	Rank	Opposition Time Speed (km/h)	Opposition Time Speed (km/h)	Opposition Time Speed (km/h)	Opposition Time Speed (km/h)	Opposition Time Speed (km/h)	Rank
Bálint Csengői	Men's sprint	10.320; 69.767	19	Martinez Chorro (ESP); L	Did not advance				19
Sándor Szalontay	Men's sprint	9.870; 72.948	9	Bye	Lendel (LTU); W 10.730; 67.101	Carlin (GBR); L, L	Did not advance		8

Team sprint

Athlete	Event	Qualification		Semifinals		Final	
Athlete	Event	Time	Rank	Opponent Results	Rank	Opponent Results	Rank
Petra Jászapáti; Zsuzsanna Kercsó-Magos; Boglárka Sáry	Women's team sprint	44.632	7	No opponent 44.605	6	Did not advance	6

Time trial

Athlete	Event	Qualifying		Final	
Athlete	Event	Time	Rank	Time	Rank
Bálint Csengői	Men's 1 km time trial	1:04.326	18	Did not advance	18
Sándor Szalontay	Men's 1 km time trial	1:01.427	10	Did not advance	10

=== BMX freestyle ===
Athlete	Event	Qualification		Final	
Athlete	Event	Points	Rank	Points	Rank
Kristóf Krausz	Men's	44.80	21	Did not advance	
Zoltán Újváry	Men's	56.60	16	Did not advance	

== Gymnastics ==
Hungary has entered five male and five female athletes.

=== Men ===
Qualification

Athlete	Event	Qualification								Final							
Athlete	Event	Apparatus						Total	Rank	Apparatus						Total	Rank
Athlete	Event	F	PH	R	V	PB	HB	Total	Rank	F	PH	R	V	PB	HB	Total	Rank
Krisztián Balázs	Team	12.966	12.833	13.000	13.766	13.966	13.733	80.264	19	13.166	13.100	—N/a		13.833	13.866	—N/a	
Botond Kardos	Team	13.366	—N/a		13.900	13.666	13.333	—N/a		14.100	—N/a		13.866	14.000	10.300	—N/a	
Balázs Kiss	Team	—N/a	13.166	13.600	—N/a					—N/a		13.366	—N/a			—N/a	
Krisztofer Mészáros	Team	14.500 Q	13.233	13.033	14.400	14.233	13.600	82.999	6	14.433	14.066	13.100	14.266	13.766	13.500	—N/a	
Benedek Tomcsányi	Team	12.233	12.933	13.366	13.933	13.100	12.166	77.731	36	—N/a	13.433	13.533	13.833	—N/a		—N/a	
Total	Team	40.832	39.332	39.999	42.233	41.865	40.666	244.927	8 Q	41.699	40.599	39.999	41.965	41.599	37.666	243.527	6

Individual finals

Athlete	Event	Apparatus						Total	Rank
Athlete	Event	F	PH	R	V	PB	HB	Total	Rank
Krisztofer Mészáros	Floor	14.600	—N/a					14.600	2nd place, silver medalist(s)

=== Women ===
Qualification

Athlete	Event	Qualification						Final					
Athlete	Event	Apparatus				Total	Rank	Apparatus				Total	Rank
Athlete	Event	V	UB	BB	F	Total	Rank	V	UB	BB	F	Total	Rank
Csenge Bácskay	Team	13.300 R	—N/a	~~11.133~~	—N/a			13.800	—N/a			—N/a	
Zsófia Kovács	Team	14.066 Q	13.366	11.900	13.433 Q	52.765	9	14.266	13.633	12.033	12.300	—N/a	
Mirtill Makovits	Team	~~12.100~~	13.066	11.400	12.033	48.599	36	—N/a	12.966	12.266	11.833	—N/a	
Gréta Mayer	Team	12.933	~~11.600~~	12.833	12.700	50.066	21	13.133	—N/a	12.766	12.433	—N/a	
Zója Székely	Team	—N/a	12.466	—N/a				—N/a	12.666	—N/a		—N/a	
Total	Team	40.299	38.898	36.133	38.166	153.496	7 Q	41.199	39.265	37.065	36.566	154.095	7

Individual finals

Athlete	Event	Apparatus				Rank
Athlete	Event	V	UB	BB	F	Rank
Zsófia Kovács	Vault	13.933	—N/a			1st place, gold medalist(s)
Zsófia Kovács	Floor	—N/a			12.533	8

== Rowing ==
Men

Athlete	Event	Heats		Repechage		Semifinals		Final	
Athlete	Event	Time	Rank	Time	Rank	Time	Rank	Time	Rank
Bendegúz Pétervári-Molnár	Single sculls	7:45.59	2 SA/B	Bye		7:37.41	6 FB	7:35.42	10
Maté Bácskai; Márton Szabó	Double sculls	7:14.44	4 R	6:59.97	2 SA/B	6:56.58	6 FB	7:03.55	11
Adrián Juhász; Béla Simon	Coxless pair	7:28.59	4 R	7:18.93	3 SA/B	7:29.36	5 FB	6:56.04	9
Roland Szigeti	Lightweight single sculls	8:37.62	5 R	7:58.49	4	Did not advance			13
Bence Tamás; Péter Galambos	Lightweight double sculls	7:26.14	4 R	7:14.39	5 FB	—N/a		6:59.39	9
Bence Szabó; Kálmán Furko	Lightweight coxless pair	—N/a						7:17.04	1st place, gold medalist(s)
Zsolt Pető	PR1 single sculls	11:47.96	3 R	11:54.60	4 FA	—N/a		11:30.27	6

Women

Athlete	Event	Heats		Repechage		Semifinals		Final	
Athlete	Event	Time	Rank	Time	Rank	Time	Rank	Time	Rank
Vivien Preil; Eszter Krémer	Double sculls	8:21.17	4 R	8:07.64	4	Did not advance			12

== Sport climbing ==
Lead

Athlete	Event	Qualification								Semifinal			Final		
Athlete	Event	Hold	Time	Rank	Hold	Time	Rank	Points	Rank	Hold	Time	Rank	Hold	Time	Rank
Gergő Vályi	Men's lead	14+	1:35	46	30+	4:10	34	41.13	42	Did not advance					

== Table tennis ==
=== Men ===
Athlete	Event	Qualification stage				Preliminary Round 1	Preliminary Round 2	Round of 64	Round of 32	Round of 16	Quarterfinals	Semifinals	Final / BM	
Athlete	Event	Opposition Score	Opposition Score	Opposition Score	Rank	Opposition Score	Opposition Score	Opposition Score	Opposition Score	Opposition Score	Opposition Score	Opposition Score	Opposition Score	Rank
Csaba András	Singles	Žeimys (LTU); W 3–1	Kulczycki (POL); W 3–0	Libene (EST); W 3–0	1 Q	Bye		Lebesson (FRA); W 4–3	Ovtcharov (GER); L 0–4	Did not advance				
Támas Lakatos	Singles	Navickas (LTU); W 3–0	Levajac (SRB); L 1–3	Radulović (MNE); W 3–1	2 Q	Bye	Peto (SRB); W 3–0	Möregårdh (SWE); L 2–4	Did not advance					
János Majoros	Singles	Grebeniuk (UKR); W 3–0	Zelenka (SVK); W 3–1	—N/a	1 Q	Bye		Monteiro (POR); W 4–3	Källberg (SWE); L 1–4	Did not advance				
Ádám Szudi	Singles	Reitspies (CZE); L 1–3	Naumi (FIN); W 3–2	Giardi (SMR); W 3–0	2 Q	Bye	Bobocica (ITA); W 3–0	Källberg (SWE); L 0–4	Did not advance					
Csaba András; János Majoros	Doubles	—N/a					Bye		Yiğenler / Gündüz (TUR); W 3–0	Lambiet / Allegro (BEL); L 0–3	Did not advance			
Nándor Ecseki; Ádám Szudi	Doubles	—N/a					Bye		Kubik / Kulczycki (POL); L 1–3	Did not advance				

=== Women ===
Athlete	Event	Qualification stage				Preliminary Round 1	Preliminary Round 2	Round of 64	Round of 32	Round of 16	Quarterfinals	Semifinals	Final / BM	
Athlete	Event	Opposition Score	Opposition Score	Opposition Score	Rank	Opposition Score	Opposition Score	Opposition Score	Opposition Score	Opposition Score	Opposition Score	Opposition Score	Opposition Score	Rank
Bernadett Bálint	Singles	Bogdanova (LAT); W 3–0	Ciobanu (ROU); L 0–3	Uce-Nikolov (MKD); W 3–0	2 Q	Bye	Šurjan (SRB); L 2–3	Did not advance						
Leonie Hartbrich	Singles	Kirichenko (FIN); W 3–0	Barbosa (LUX); W 3–1	—N/a	1 Q	Bye		Gaponova (UKR); L 1–4	Did not advance					
Dóra Madarász	Singles	Bye						Brateyko (UKR); W 4–1	Samara (ROU); L 3–4	Did not advance				
Georgina Póta	Singles	Bye						Moret (SUI); W 4–3	Szőcs (ROU); L 0–4	Did not advance				
Bernadett Bálint; Leonie Hartbrich	Doubles	—N/a				Bye	Musajeva (LAT) / Chiriacova (MDA); W 3–2	—N/a	Ni / de Nutte (LUX); L 1–3	Did not advance				
Dóra Madarász; Georgina Póta	Doubles	—N/a				Bye		—N/a	Xiao (ESP) / Diaconu (ROU); L 0–3	Did not advance				

=== Mixed ===
Athlete	Event	Preliminary Round 1	Preliminary Round 2	Round of 32	Round of 16	Quarterfinals	Semifinals	Final / BM
Athlete	Event	Opposition Score	Opposition Score	Opposition Score	Opposition Score	Opposition Score	Opposition Score	Rank
Nándor Ecseki; Dóra Madarász	Doubles	Bye		Haug / Carlsen (NOR); W 3–0	Kožul / Stražar (SLO); W 3–2	Lebesson / Yuan (FRA); L 2–3	Did not advance	
Bence Majoros; Leonie Hartbrich	Doubles	Bye	Andersen (DEN) / Matos (POR); L 0–3	Did not advance				

== Triathlon ==
=== Men ===
Athlete	Event	Swim (1.5 km)	Trans 1	Bike (40 km)	Trans 2	Run (10 km)	Total Time	Rank
Bence Bicsák	Men's	18:18	0:33	51:33	0:25	31:57	1:42:46	10
Márk Dévay	Men's	17:33	0:36	51:26	0:27	32:54	1:42:56	12
Csongor Lehmann	Men's	17:37	0:33	51:25	0:23	31:32	1:41:30	4
Tamás Tóth	Men's	18:30	0:37	DNF				

=== Women ===
Athlete	Event	Swim (1.5 km)	Trans 1	Bike (40 km)	Trans 2	Run (10 km)	Total Time	Rank
Zsófia Kovács	Women's	20:03	0:34	59:48	0:31	38:20	1:59:16	31
Noémi Sárszegi	Women's	20:59	0:36	Lapped				

=== Mixed ===
Athlete	Event	Swim (300 m)	Trans 1	Bike (6.8 km)	Trans 2	Run (2 km)	Total Group Time	Rank
Márk Dévay; Zsanett Bragmayer; Csongor Lehmann; Lili Dobi	Mixed relay	15:29	3:04	47:05	1:38	21:10	1:28:35	10
