= Belgium at the 2022 European Championships =

in Munich 11 August 2022 – 22 August 2022
- Competitors: 129 in 10 sports
- Medals Ranked 18th: Gold 3 Silver 3 Bronze 4 Total 10

European Championships appearances
- 2018; 2022

Belgium will compete at the 2022 European Championships in Munich from August 11 to August 22, 2022.

== Medallists ==
Medal	Name	Sport	Event	Date
Gold	Lotte Kopecky	Track Cycling	Women's elimination race	13 August
Gold	Lotte Kopecky	Track Cycling	Women's points race	14 August
Gold	Nafissatou Thiam	Athletics	Women's heptathlon	18 August
Silver	Robbe Ghys	Track Cycling	Men's points race	12 August
Silver	Hermien Peters; Lize Broekx	Canoe Sprint	Women's K–2 500 metres	20 August
Silver	Dylan Borlée; Kevin Borlée; Alexander Doom; Julien Watrin	Athletics	Men's 4 × 400 m relay	20 August
Bronze	Tim Merlier	Road Cycling	Men's road race	14 August
Bronze	Jules Hesters	Track Cycling	Men's elimination race	14 August
Bronze	Robbe Ghys; Fabio Van Den Bossche	TrackCycling	Men's madison	16 August
Bronze	Artuur Peters	Canoe Sprint	Men's K–1 1000 metres	20 August

== Competitors ==
The following is the list of number of competitors in the Championships:

Sport	Men	Women	Total
Artistic gymnastics (men and women)	5	5	10
Athletics	36	25	61
Canoe sprint	2	4	6
Cycling mountain bike	3	2	5
Cycling road	7	8	15
Cycling track	7	4	11
Rowing	6	0	6
Sport climbing	3	1	4
Table tennis	4	1	5
Triathlon	3	3	6
Total	76	53	129

== Athletics ==
The following athletes were selected to compete by the Royal Belgian Athletics Federation.

- including alternates

Key

- Note–Ranks given for track events are within the athlete's heat only
- Q = Qualified for the next round
- q = Qualified for the next round as a fastest loser or, in field events, by position without achieving the qualifying target
- NR = National record
- CHB = Championship best
- WL = World Leading
- PB = Personal best
- SB = Season's best
- — = Round not applicable for the event
- Bye = Athlete not required to compete in round
- DNF = Did not finish
- DNS = Did not start
- NM = No valid trial recorded

Men
Track and road events

Athlete	Event	Heat		Semifinal		Final	
Athlete	Event	Result	Rank	Result	Rank	Result	Rank
Kobe Vleminckx	100 metres	10.34	3 Q	10.34	7	did not advance	
Robin Vanderbemden	200 metres	20.90	5	did not advance			
Dylan Borlée	400 metres	Bye		45.67	2 Q	45.39	5
Kevin Borlée	400 metres	Bye		DNF		did not advance	
Alexander Doom	400 metres	Bye		45.77	6	did not advance	
Eliott Crestan	800 metres	1:47.41	1 Q	1:47.13	5 q	1:45.68 SB	8
Tibo De Smet	800 metres	1:46.48	4 q	1:49.10	6	did not advance	
Aurèle Vandeputte	800 metres	1:48.46	8	did not advance			
Ismael Debjani	1500 metres	3:38.96	2 Q	—N/a		3:43.28	12
Tarik Moukrime	1500 metres	3:41.46	11	—N/a		did not advance	
Ruben Verheyden	1500 metres	3:44.76	13	—N/a		did not advance	
Isaac Kimeli	5000 metres	—N/a				13:33.39	11
Michael Somers	5000 metres	—N/a				13:57.82	23
Simon Debognies	10,000 metres	—N/a				28:08.60	13
Isaac Kimeli	10,000 metres	—N/a				DNF	
Michael Somers	10,000 metres	—N/a				29:10.13	21
Michael Obasuyi	110 metres hurdles	13.90	5	did not advance			
Dries Van Nieuwenhove	400 metres hurdles	50.85	3	51.14	8	did not advance	
Julien Watrin	400 metres hurdles	Bye		48.81 NR	3 q	48.98	6
Rémi Schyns	3000 metres steeplechase	9:21.85	16	—N/a		did not advance	
Tim Van de Velde	3000 metres steeplechase	8:38.23	9	—N/a		did not advance	
Soufiane Bouchikhi	Marathon	—N/a				DNF	
Koen Naert	Marathon	—N/a				2:11:28 SB	8
Nicolaï Saké	Marathon	—N/a				DNF	
Valentijn Hoornaert^{3} Ward Merckx; Jordan Paquot^{2} Robin Vanderbemden; Simon Verherstraeten^{1} Kobe Vleminckx	4 × 100 metres relay	38.73 NR	4 q	—N/a		39.01	6
Dylan Borlée; Jonathan Borlée^{1} Kévin Borlée^{2} Alexander Doom; Jonathan Sacoor^{1} Julien Watrin^{2}	4 × 400 metres relay	3:01.81	4 q	—N/a		2:59.49	2nd place, silver medalist(s)

^{1}ran only the heats ^{2} ran only the final ^{3}did not come in action

Field events

Athlete	Event	Qualification		Final	
Athlete	Event	Distance	Position	Distance	Position
Thomas Carmoy	High jump	2.21	=1 q	2.23	5
Ben Broeders	Pole vault	5.50	=15	did not advance	
Philip Milanov	Discus throw	61.04	15	did not advance	
Timothy Herman	Javelin throw	77.20	12 q	74.84	10

Combined events – Decathlon

Athlete	Event	100 m	LJ	SP	HJ	400 m	110H	DT	PV	JT	1500 m	Final	Rank
Niels Pittomvils	Result	11.32 SB	7.10 SB	15.25	2.02 SB	51.09	14.81 SB	46.77 SB	4.70	56.30	4:42.62 SB	7862	12
Niels Pittomvils	Points	791	838	805	822	765	873	803	819	682	664	7862	12

Women
Track and road events

Athlete	Event	Heat		Semifinal		Final	
Athlete	Event	Result	Rank	Result	Rank	Result	Rank
Rani Rosius	100 metres	11.47	5 q	11.53	6	did not advance	
Delphine Nkansa	100 metres	11.33	1 Q	11.39	4	did not advance	
Delphine Nkansa	200 metres	23.08	2 Q	23.28	4	did not advance	
Imke Vervaet	200 metres	23.05 =PB	2 Q	23.48	6	did not advance	
Cynthia Bolingo	400 metres	Bye		50.83 SB	2 Q	50.94	7
Camille Laus	400 metres	51.91	4 q	54.28	8	did not advance	
Naomi Van den Broeck	400 metres	52.80	7	did not advance			
Vanessa Scaunet	800 metres	DNF		did not advance			
Elise Vanderelst	1500 metres	4:07.62	7	—N/a		did not advance	
Lisa Rooms	5000 metres	—N/a				15:50.59 PB	15
Anne Zagré	100 metres hurdles	13.12	1 Q	13.12	5	did not advance	
Hanne Claes	400 metres hurdles	Bye		55.31	4	did not advance	
Paulien Couckuyt	400 metres hurdles	Bye		56.14	6	did not advance	
Nina Hespel	400 metres hurdles	56.72	5 q	59.15	7	did not advance	
Eline Daelemans	3000 metres steeplechase	10:15.73	16	—N/a		did not advance	
Mieke Gorissen	Marathon	—N/a				2:31:48	13
Hanne Verbruggen	Marathon	—N/a				2:29:44 SB	8
Astrid Verhoeven	Marathon	—N/a				2:40:03	33
Team	Marathon	—N/a				7:41:35	4
Marine Jehaes^{3} Elise Mehuys; Delphine Nkansa; Mariam Oularé^{3} Rani Rosius; Rani Vincke	4 × 100 metres relay	43.58 SB	4 q	—N/a		43.98	6
Cynthia Bolingo^{2} Hanne Claes^{2} Camille Laus; Helena Ponnet; Naomi Van den Broeck^{1} Imke Vervaet^{1}	4 × 400 metres relay	3:25.44 SB	2 Q	—N/a		3:22.12 NR	4

^{1} ran only the heats ^{2}ran only the final ^{3}did not come in action

Field events

Athlete	Event	Qualification		Final	
Athlete	Event	Distance	Position	Distance	Position
Vanessa Sterckendries	Hammer throw	66.95	11	did not advance	

Combined events – Heptathlon

Athlete	Event	100H	HJ	SP	200 m	LJ	JT	800 m	Final	Rank
Nafissatou Thiam	Result	13.34	1.98 CHB PB	14.95	24.64	6.08	48.89	2:17.95	6628	1st place, gold medalist(s)
Nafissatou Thiam	Points	1074	1211	858	920	874	839	852	6628	1st place, gold medalist(s)
Noor Vidts	Result	13.29	1.83	13.86	24.14	6.31	41.82 PB	2:09.63	6467	4
Noor Vidts	Points	1081	1016	785	967	946	702	970	6467	4

== Canoe Sprint ==
=== Men ===
Athlete	Event	Heat		Semifinal		Final	
Athlete	Event	Result	Rank	Result	Rank	Result	Rank
Artuur Peters	K-1 1000 m	3:35.552	1 FA	Bye		3:32.401	3rd place, bronze medalist(s)
Artuur Peters; Bram Sikkens	K-2 500 m	1:35.327	3 SF	1:30.541	3 FA	1:33.080	8

=== Women ===
Athlete	Event	Heat		Semifinal		Final	
Athlete	Event	Result	Rank	Result	Rank	Result	Rank
Lize Broekx; Hermien Peters	K-2 500 m	1:44.976	2 SF	1:42.612	1 FA	1:42.230	2nd place, silver medalist(s)
Lize Broekx; Camille Dewaele; Hermien Peters; Amber Van Broekhoven	K-4 500 m	1:37.217	6 SF	1:37.640	6 X	Did not advance	

X = Eliminated SF = Qualified for Semi-finals FA = Qualified for Final A

== Cycling ==
=== Road ===
==== Men ====
Athlete	Event	Final	
Athlete	Event	Result	Rank
Dries De Bondt	Road race	4:45:27	115
Aimé De Gendt	Road race	4:39:35	79
Rune Herregodts	Road race	4:45:27	116
Rune Herregodts	Time trial	28:43.80	12
Tim Merlier	Road race	4:38:49	3rd place, bronze medalist(s)
Edward Theuns	Road race	4:38:57	29
Dries Van Gestel	Road race	4:39:39	80
Bert Van Lerberghe	Road race	4:38:52	24

==== Women ====
Athlete	Event	Final	
Athlete	Event	Result	Rank
Sanne Cant	Road race	2:59:20	24
Kim De Baat	Road race	DNF	
Valerie Demey	Road race	3:02:28	75
Justine Ghekiere	Road race	2:59:30	34
Lone Meertens	Road race	3:02:32	86
Marthe Truyen	Road race	3:02:28	73
Jesse Vandenbulcke	Road race	3:02:23	69
Julie Van de Velde	Road race	3:02:32	85
Julie Van de Velde	Time trial	32:30.76	7

=== Track ===
Elimination race

Athlete	Event	Rank
Jules Hesters	Men's elimination race	3rd place, bronze medalist(s)
Lotte Kopecky	Women's elimination race	1st place, gold medalist(s)

Keirin

Athlete	Event	1st Round	Repechage	Semifinal	Final
Athlete	Event	Rank	Rank	Rank	Rank
Nicky Degrendele	Women's Keirin	2 SF	Bye	1 F1-6	4

SF = Qualified for Semifinals F1-6 = Qualified for Final 1st - 6th

Madison

Athlete	Event	Final	
Athlete	Event	Points	Rank
Robbe Ghys; Fabio Van Den Bossche	Men's madison	58	3rd place, bronze medalist(s)
Katrijn De Clercq; Marith Vanhove	Women's madison	-120	10

Omnium

Athlete	Event	Qualifying Points Race		Scratch Race		Tempo Race		Elimination Race		Points Race		Total points	Rank
Athlete	Event	Points	Rank	Points	Rank	Points	Rank	Points	Rank	Points	Rank	Total points	Rank
Fabio Van Den Bossche	Men's omnium	11	1 QF	40	1	36	3	24	9	25	6	125	6
Lotte Kopecky	Women's omnium	—N/a		26	8	26	8	38	2	43	7	133	4

QF = Qualified for Finals

Points race

Athlete	Event	Total points	Rank
Robbe Ghys	Men's points race	123	2nd place, silver medalist(s)
Lotte Kopecky	Women's points race	85	1st place, gold medalist(s)

Pursuit

Athlete	Event	Qualification		First round		Final	
Athlete	Event	Time	Rank	Opponent Results	Rank	Opponent Results	Rank
Thibaut Bernard	Men's individual pursuit	4:19.761	10	—N/a		did not advance	
Brent Van Mulders	Men's individual pursuit	4:27.012	18	—N/a		did not advance	
Katrijn De Clercq	Women's individual pursuit	3:38.700	13	—N/a		did not advance	
Marith Vanhove	Women's individual pursuit	3:35.819	11	—N/a		did not advance	
Thibaut Bernard; Maxwell De Broeder; Arthur Senrame; Brent Van Mulders	Men's team pursuit	4:03.021	8	Germany (GER); L 4:00.674	6	Did not advance	

Scratch

Athlete	Event	Laps down	Rank
Jules Hesters	Men's scratch	2	5
Katrijn De Clercq	Women's scratch		8

Sprint

Athlete	Event	Qualification		Round 1	Round 2	Quarterfinals	Semifinals	Final	
Athlete	Event	Time Speed (km/h)	Rank	Opposition	Opposition	Opposition	Opposition	Opposition	Rank
Nicky Degrendele	Women's sprint	10.779 NR	10 Q	Capewell (GBR); L	Did not advance				

NR = National record

Time trial

Athlete	Event	Qualifying		Final	
Athlete	Event	Time	Rank	Time	Rank
Maxwell De Broeder	Men's 1 km time trial	1:03.533	16	Did not advance	
Arthur Senrame	Men's 1 km time trial	1:04.072	17	Did not advance	

=== Mountain bike ===
==== Men ====
Athlete	Event	Time	Rank
Pierre de Froidmont	Cross-country	1:22:32	38
Jens Schuermans	Cross-country	1:18:34	6
Daan Soete	Cross-country	1:20:27	18

==== Women ====
Athlete	Event	Time	Rank
Emeline Detilleux	Cross-country	-1LAP	33
Githa Michiels	Cross-country	1:38:28	29

== Gymnastics ==
Belgium has entered five male and five female athletes.

=== Men ===
Team & Individual All-around Finals

Athlete	Event	Team Qualification and All-Around Final								Team Final							
Athlete	Event	Apparatus						Total	Rank	Apparatus						Total	Rank
Athlete	Event	F	PH	R	V	PB	HB	Total	Rank	F	PH	R	V	PB	HB	Total	Rank
Glen Cuyle	Team	12.100		13.333	14.233											—N/a	
Nicola Cuyle	Team	12.733	12.900			13.033	12.233									—N/a	
Noah Kuavita	Team		13.233	12.666	14.500	14.000	14.066									—N/a	
Takumi Onoshima	Team	13.866	11.166	13.133	13.966	13.533	13.733	79.397	27							—N/a	
Luca Van Den Keybus	Team	12.500	10.900	12.766	14.066	13.500	13.466	77.198	40							—N/a	
Total	Team	39.099	37.299	39.232	42.799	41.033	41.265	240.727	12	Did not advance							

Individual Apparatus Finals

Athlete	Apparatus	Score	Rank
Noah Kuavita	Horizontal bar	13.166	7

=== Women ===
Team & Individual All-around Finals

Athlete	Event	Team Qualification and All-Around Final						Team Final					
Athlete	Event	Apparatus				Total	Rank	Apparatus				Total	Rank
Athlete	Event	V	UB	BB	F	Total	Rank	V	UB	BB	F	Total	Rank
Fien Enghels	Team		12.600	12.700		—N/a			12.633			—N/a	
Noemie Louon	Team	12.700	12.933	12.933	DNS	DNF				12.833		—N/a	
Lisa Vaelen	Team	14.200	13.500	12.933	13.066	53.699	5	14.200	14.066	11.833	13.100	—N/a	
Jutta Verkest	Team	12.733		13.000	12.566	—N/a		13.000		12.933	12.300	—N/a	
Total	Team	39.899	39.566	38.866	37.332	155.663	5 Q	40.133	39.832	37.599	37.966	155.530	5

Individual Apparatus Finals

Athlete	Apparatus	Score	Rank
Lisa Vaelen	Vault	13.583	4

== Rowing ==
Men

Athlete	Event	Heats		Repechage		Semifinals		Final	
Athlete	Event	Time	Rank	Time	Rank	Time	Rank	Time	Rank
Ruben Claeys; Ward Lemmelin; Gaston Mercier; Tim Brys	Quadruple sculls	6:24.16	3 SA/B	—N/a		6:31.47	6 FB	6:07.51	6
Marlon Colpaert	Lightweight single sculls	8:12.13	4 R	7:49.86	2 SA/B	7:29.90	5 FB	7:39.70	5

R = Qualified for Repechage SA/B = Qualified for Semifinal A/B FB = Qualified for Final B

== Sport climbing ==
Boulder

Athlete	Event	Qualification							Semifinal						Final					
Athlete	Event	Boulder					Result	Rank	Boulder				Result	Rank	Boulder				Result	Rank
Athlete	Event	1	2	3	4	5	Result	Rank	1	2	3	4	Result	Rank	1	2	3	4	Result	Rank
Nicolas Collin	Men's boulder	19.9	0.0	3.0	0.0	0.0	22.9	27	Did not advance											
Simon Lorenzi	Men's boulder	3.0	19.8	19.7	3.0	3.0	48.5	23	Did not advance											
Hannes Van Duysen	Men's boulder	3.0	0.0	3.0	0.0	0.0	6	41	Did not advance											
Chloë Caulier	Women's boulder	20.0	3.0	19.7	3.0	20	65.7	1 Q	24.9	3.0	24.9	24.8	77.6	2 Q	3.0	0.0	24.7	3.0	30.7	4

Combined

Athlete	Event	Qualification		Final						
Athlete	Event	Total	Rank	Boulder		Lead			Total	Rank
Athlete	Event	Total	Rank	Result	Place	Hold	Time	Place	Total	Rank
Nicolas Collin	Men's	223.00	21	Did not advance						
Simon Lorenzi	Men's	242.50	19	Did not advance						
Hannes Van Duysen	Men's	312.50	17	Did not advance						
Chloë Caulier	Women's	830.00	5 Q	58.9	6					

Lead

Athlete	Event	Qualification						Semifinal		Final	
Athlete	Event	Route A		Route B		Points	Rank	Points	Rank	Points	Rank
Athlete	Event	Score	Rank	Score	Rank	Points	Rank	Points	Rank	Points	Rank
Nicolas Collin	Men's lead	35+	20	39+	23	22.36	23 Q	32+	20	Did not advance	
Simon Lorenzi	Men's lead	25+	29	40	17	23.78	26 Q	30+	22	Did not advance	
Hannes Van Duysen	Men's lead	26+	28	42+	13	20.15	19 Q	36+	12	Did not advance	
Chloë Caulier	Women's lead	36	=17	30+	11	14.48	14 Q	19+	16	Did not advance	

== Table tennis ==
Belgium entered 4 men and 1 woman.

=== Men ===
Athlete	Event	Group stage				Preliminary Round 1	Preliminary Round 2	Round of 64	Round of 32	Round of 16	Quarterfinals	Semifinals	Final / BM	
Athlete	Event	Opposition Score	Opposition Score	Opposition Score	Rank	Opposition Score	Opposition Score	Opposition Score	Opposition Score	Opposition Score	Opposition Score	Opposition Score	Opposition Score	Rank
Martin Allegro	Singles	Limonov (UKR); W 3–0	Karakasevic (SRB); W 3–0	—N/a	1 Q	Bye		Lebrun (FRA); L 1–4	Did not advance					
Florent Lambiet	Singles	Yiangou (CYP); W 3–0	Pistej (SVK); W 1–3	Konstantinopoulos (GRE); W 3–0	1 Q	Bye		Lebrun (FRA); L 4–1	Did not advance					
Cédric Nuytinck	Singles	Berzosa (ESP); W 3–0	Rasmussen (DEN); W 3–0	—N/a	1 Q	Bye		Gardos (AUT); W 4–1	Lebrun (FRA); L 0–4	Did not advance				
Adrien Rassenfosse	Singles	Cvetko (SLO); W 3–0	Israeli (ISR); W 3–0	—N/a	1 Q	Bye		Gauzy (FRA); W 3–4	Pucar (CRO); L 3–4					
Martin Allegro; Florent Lambiet	Doubles	—N/a				Bye		—N/a	Hribar / Cvetko (SLO); W 1–3	Majoros / András (HUN); W 0–3	Falck / Karlsson (SWE)L 3–0	Did not advance		
Cédric Nuytinck; Jakub Dyjas (POL)	Doubles	—N/a				Bye		—N/a	Zeljko / Kojić (CRO); W 3–1	Persson / Källberg (SWE)L 2–3	Did not advance			
Adrien Rassenfosse; Borgar Haug (NOR)	Doubles	—N/a				Bye	Zhmudenko / Limonov (UKR); W 3–0	—N/a	Martinko / Sirucek (CZE); L 1–3	Did not advance				

=== Women ===
Athlete	Event	Group stage			Preliminary Round 1	Preliminary Round 2	Round of 64	Round of 32	Round of 16	Quarterfinals	Semifinals	Final / BM	
Athlete	Event	Opposition Score	Opposition Score	Rank	Opposition Score	Opposition Score	Opposition Score	Opposition Score	Opposition Score	Opposition Score	Opposition Score	Opposition Score	Rank
Margo Degraef	Singles	Men (NED); L 3–0	Betz (FIN); W 3–0	2	Jeger (CRO); L 3–2	Did not advance							
Margo Degraef; Sofia-Xuan Zhang (ESP)	Doubles	—N/a			Bye	Solja (AUT) / Sevcikova (CZE); L 3–0	Did not advance						

=== Mixed ===
Athlete	Event	Preliminary Round 1	Preliminary Round 2	Round of 32	Round of 16	Quarterfinals	Semifinals	Final / BM	
Athlete	Event	Opposition Score	Opposition Score	Opposition Score	Opposition Score	Opposition Score	Opposition Score	Opposition Score	Rank
Margo Degraef; Michael Tauber (ISR)	Doubles	Caballero / Zhang (ESP); L 1–3	Did not advance						

== Triathlon ==
=== Men ===
Athlete	Event	Swim (1.5 km)		Trans 1	Bike (40 km)		Trans 2	Run (10 km)		Total Time	Rank
Athlete	Event	Time	Rank	Trans 1	Time	Rank	Trans 2	Time	Rank	Total Time	Rank
Jelle Geens	Men's	18:41	48	0:33	0:51:06	1	0:21	0:31:00	1	1:41:39	5
Noah Servais	Men's	18:12	17	0:33	0:54:10	55	0:24	0:36:00	47	1:49:17	50
Erwin Vanderplancke	Men's	18:41	47	0:32	0:51:14	10	0:29	0:35:39	44	1:46:32	38

=== Women ===
Athlete	Event	Swim (1.5 km)		Trans 1	Bike (40 km)		Trans 2	Run (10 km)		Total Time	Rank
Athlete	Event	Time	Rank	Trans 1	Time	Rank	Trans 2	Time	Rank	Total Time	Rank
Valérie Barthelemy	Women's	19:31	8	0:37	0:57:12	20	0:28	0:36:26	15	1:54:11	14
Hanne De Vet	Women's	20:06	31	0:37	0:56:44	4	0:30	0:39:26	31	1:57:21	22
Jolien Vermeylen	Women's	19:43	19	0:35	Did not finish						

=== Mixed ===
Athlete	Event	Swim (300 m)	Trans 1	Bike (6.8 km)	Trans 2	Run (2 km)	Total Group Time	Rank
Jelle Geens; Valerie Barthelemy; Erwin Vanderplancke; Jolien Vermeylen	Mixed relay	3:50; 4:03; 3:41; 3:51	0:41; 0:46; 0:41; 0:44<	11:04; 12:00; 11:11; 12:35	0:22; 0:26; 0:22; 0:24	4:26; 5:17; 4:36; 5:53	1:27:01	4
