= Montenegro at the 2022 European Championships =

in (Germany) Munich 11 August 2022 – 21 August 2022
- Competitors: 6 in 3 sports
- Medals Ranked 33rd: Gold 0 Silver 1 Bronze 0 Total 1

European Championships appearances
- 2018; 2022

Montenegro competed at the 2022 European Championships in Munich, Germany, from 11 to 21 August 2018.

== Medallists ==
Medal	Name	Sport	Event	Date
Silver	Marija Vuković	Athletics	Women's high jump	21 August

== Competitors ==
The following is the list of number of competitors in the Championships:

Sport	Men	Women	Total
Athletics	1	1	2
Cycling road	2	0	2
Table tennis	2	0	2
Total	5	1	6

== Athletics ==
Montenegro entered the following athletes.

Key

- Q = Qualified for the next round
- q = Qualified for the next round as a fastest loser or, in field events, by position without achieving the qualifying target
- NR = National record
- PB = Personal best
- SB = Season best
- N/A = Round not applicable for the event

=== Men ===
Field events

Athlete	Event	Qualification		Final	
Athlete	Event	Result	Rank	Result	Rank
Danijel Furtula	Discus throw	59.10	21	did not advance	

=== Women ===
Field events

Athlete	Event	Qualification		Final	
Athlete	Event	Result	Rank	Result	Rank
Marija Vuković	High jump	1.87	1 q	1.95	2nd place, silver medalist(s)
