= Austria at the 2022 European Championships =

in (Germany) Munich 11 August 2022 – 22 August 2022
- Competitors: 109 in 11 sports
- Medals Ranked 13th: Gold 4 Silver 2 Bronze 2 Total 8

European Championships appearances
- 2018; 2022

Austria competed at the 2022 European Championships in Munich from 11 August to 22 August 2022.

== Medallists ==
Medal	Name	Sport	Event	Date
Gold	Nicolai Uznik	Sport climbing	Men's boulder	13 August
Gold	Jakob Schubert	Sport climbing	Men's boulder & lead	18 August
Gold	Sofia Polcanova	Table tennis	Women's doubles	18 August
Gold	Sofia Polcanova	Table tennis	Women's singles	21 August
Silver	Jessica Pilz	Sport climbing	Women's lead	13 August
Silver	Robert Gardos; Daniel Habesohn	Table tennis	Men's doubles	18 August
Bronze	Robert Gardos; Sofia Polcanova	Table tennis	Mixed doubles	15 August
Bronze	Jessica Pilz	Sport climbing	Women's boulder & lead	17 August

== Competitors ==
The following is the list of number of competitors in the Championships:

Sport	Men	Women	Total
Artistic gymnastics (men and women)	5	5	10
Athletics	5	9	14
Beach volleyball	8	4	12
Canoe sprint	3	2	3
Cycling mountain bike	4	2	6
Cycling road	7	7	14
Cycling track	4	3	7
Rowing	7	5	12
Sport climbing	8	7	15
Table tennis	5	3	8
Triathlon	3	3	6
Total	59	50	109

== Athletics ==
Austria entered the following athletes.

Key

- Q = Qualified for the next round
- q = Qualified for the next round as a fastest loser or, in field events, by position without achieving the qualifying target
- NR = National record
- PB = Personal best
- SB = Season best
- N/A = Round not applicable for the event

=== Men ===
Track and road events

Athlete	Event	Heat		Semifinal		Final	
Athlete	Event	Result	Rank	Result	Rank	Result	Rank
Markus Fuchs	100 metres	Bye		10.42	23	did not advance	
Andreas Vojta	10,000 metres	—				29:56.71	22
Niklas Strohmeyer-Dangl	400 metres hurdles	51.21	24	did not advance			

Field events

Athlete	Event	Qualification		Final	
Athlete	Event	Distance	Position	Distance	Position
Riccardo Klotz	Pole vault	5.30	21	did not advance	
Lukas Weißhaidinger	Discus throw	65.48	5 q	63.02	9

=== Women ===
Track and road events

Athlete	Event	Heat		Semifinal		Final	
Athlete	Event	Result	Rank	Result	Rank	Result	Rank
Magdalena Lindner	100 metres	11.58	16	did not advance			
Susanne Walli	200 metres	23.45	16 q	23.73	21	did not advance	
Susanne Walli	400 metres	51.73 SB	5 Q	52.58	20	did not advance	
Julia Mayer	10,000 metres	—				33:57.29	18
Lena Pressler	400 metres hurdles	57.33	18	did not advance			
Lena Millonig	3000 metres steeplechase	9:57.50	19	—		did not advance	
Magdalena Lindner; Lena Pressler; Viktoria Wallhuber; Susanne Walli	4 × 100 metres relay	DQ		—		did not advance	

Field events

Athlete	Event	Qualification		Final	
Athlete	Event	Distance	Position	Distance	Position
Victoria Hudson	Javelin throw	60.49	5 q	56.07	10

Combined events – Heptathlon

Athlete	Event	100H	HJ	SP	200 m	LJ	JT	800 m	Final	Rank
Ivona Dadic	Result	13.70 SB	1.77 SB	14.31	DQ	DNS	DNF			
Ivona Dadic	Points	1021	941	815	0	DNS	DNF			

== Beach volleyball ==
Austria has qualified 4 male and 2 female pairs.

Athlete	Event	Preliminary round			Round of 24	Round of 16	Quarterfinals	Semifinals	Final / BM	
Athlete	Event	Opposition Score	Opposition Score	Rank	Opposition Score	Opposition Score	Opposition Score	Opposition Score	Opposition Score	Rank
Martin Ermacora; Moritz Pristauz	Men's	Krou – Gauthier-Rat (FRA); L 0–2 (19–21, 18–21)	Sowa - Pfretzschner (GER); L 1–2 (21–19, 23–25, 13–15)	4	Did not advance					
Julian Hörl; Alexander Horst	Men's	Immers – Boermans (NED); W 2–1 (21–19, 21–23, 15–8)	Ehlers - Wickler (GER); W 2–1 (21–16, 15–21, 16–14)	1 Q	—	Nolvak - Tiisaar (EST); W 2–1 (18–21, 21–18, 15–8)	Perusic - Schweiner (CZE); L 0–2 (17–21, 19–21)	Did not advance		
Alexander Huber; Christoph Dressler	Men's	Herrera – Gavira (ESP); L 0–2 (15–21, 25–27)	Henning - Winter (GER); W 2–1 (13–21, 21–18, 15–12)	3 Q	Ehlers - Wickler (GER); L 1–2 (17–21, 21–19, 12–15)	Did not advance				
Robin Seidl; Philipp Waller	Men's	Métral – Haussener (SUI); W 2–1 (21–18, 17–21, 16–14)	Carambula - Rossi (ITA); L 1–2 (17–21, 21–18, 12–15)	2 Q	Penninga - Luini (NED); W 2–1 (24–26, 21–15, 15–10)	Brouwer - Meeuwsen (NED); W 2–1 (21–16, 10–21, 15–10)	Bryl - Losiak (POL); L 1–2 (21–16, 20–22, 11–15)	Did not advance		
Dorina Klinger; Ronja Klinger	Women's	Laboureur – Schulz (GER); L 0–2 (10–21, 13–21)	Bianchin - Scampoli (ITA); L 1–2 (21–15, 19–21, 13–15)	4	Did not advance					
Katharina Schützenhöfer; Lena Plesiutschnig	Women's	van Driel – Piersma (NED); W 2–1 (21–10, 19–21, 16–14)	Verge-Depre - Bentele (SUI); L 0–2 (14–21, 11–21)	2 Q	Windeleff - Bisgaard (DEN); L 0–2 (14–21, 20–22)	Did not advance				

== Canoeing ==
Men

Athlete	Event	Heats		Semifinals		Final	
Athlete	Event	Time	Rank	Time	Rank	Time	Rank
Manfred Pallinger	C–1 200 m	43.458	7 SF	42.921	9	Did not advance	
Manfred Pallinger	C–1 500 m	2:07.458	6 SF	1:55.312	8 BT	1:55.817	17
Manfred Pallinger	C–1 5000 m	—				24:23.877	6
Timon Maurer	K–1 500 m	1:43.040	2 SF	1:42.469	2 FA	1:39.939	5
Timon Maurer	K–1 1000 m	3:37.998	6 SF	3:41.231	6 FB	3:37.549	11
Marcus Swoboda	KL2 200 m	45.929	2 F	Bye		44.467	5
Marcus Swoboda	VL3 200 m	52.126	3 F	Bye		51.850	9

Women

Athlete	Event	Heats		Semifinals		Final	
Athlete	Event	Time	Rank	Time	Rank	Time	Rank
Ana Roxana Lehaci	K–1 5000 m	—				23:56.342	9
Adriana Lehaci; Ana Roxana Lehaci	K–2 200 m	—				40.098	6
Adriana Lehaci; Ana Roxana Lehaci	K–2 500 m	1:53.815	4 SF	1:47.294	5 FB	1:47.951	14

== Cycling ==
=== Road ===
Men

Athlete	Event	Time	Rank
Tobias Bayer	Road race	4:38:57	27
Patrick Gamper	Road race	4:39:35	74
Marco Haller	Road race	4:38:49	19
Rainer Kepplinger	Time trial	28:51.79	17
Patrick Konrad	Road race	4:41:52	102
Lukas Pöstlberger	Road race	4:46:42	125
Sebastian Schönberger	Road race	4:38:57	26

Women

Athlete	Event	Time	Rank
Anna Kiesenhofer	Time trial	32:00.87	5
Alina Reichert	Road race	DNF	
Sarah Rijkes	Road race	2:59:42	47
Carina Schrempf	Road race	2:59:27	26
Christina Schweinberger	Road race	2:59:20	10
Christina Schweinberger	Time trial	32:32.76	8
Kathrin Schweinberger	Road race	3:02:28	78
Gabriela Thanner	Road race	DNF	

=== Track ===
Elimination race

Athlete	Event	Final
Athlete	Event	Rank
Verena Eberhardt	Women's elimination race	15

Madison

Athlete	Event	Final	
Athlete	Event	Points	Rank
Felix Ritzinger; Tim Wafler	Men's madison	DNF	
Verena Eberhardt; Kathrin Schweinberger	Women's madison	−140	12

Omnium

Athlete	Event	Qualification		Scratch Race		Tempo Race		Elimination Race		Points Race		Total points	Rank
Athlete	Event	Rank	Points	Rank	Points	Rank	Points	Rank	Points	Rank	Points	Total points	Rank
Tim Wafler	Men's omnium	8 Q	2	12	18	4	34	11	20	10	2	74	11
Verena Eberhardt	Women's omnium	—		15	12	14	14	20	2	12	5	33	15

Points race

Athlete	Event	Final	
Athlete	Event	Points	Rank
Maximilian Schmidbauer	Men's points race	–17	15
Kathrin Schweinberger	Women's points race	−37	13

Scratch

Athlete	Event	Final	
Athlete	Event	Laps down	Rank
Tim Wafler	Men's scratch	−2	8
Kathrin Schweinberger	Women's scratch	0	12

=== Mountain bike ===
Athlete	Event	Time	Rank
Moritz Bscherer	Men's cross-country	1:25:52	46
Maximilian Foidl	Men's cross-country	DNS	
Karl Markt	Men's cross-country	1:21:29	33
Gregor Raggl	Men's cross-country	1:20:37	23
Corina Druml	Women's cross-country	1:38:10	25
Mona Mitterwallner	Women's cross-country	1:35:14	16

== Gymnastics ==
Austria has entered 5 men and 5 women.

=== Men ===
Qualification

Athlete	Event	Qualification								Final							
Athlete	Event	Apparatus						Total	Rank	Apparatus						Total	Rank
Athlete	Event	F	PH	R	V	PB	HB	Total	Rank	F	PH	R	V	PB	HB	Total	Rank
Alexander Benda	Team	13.500	12.266	12.866	13.800	13.166	13.366	78.964	30	Did not advance							
Vinzenz Höck	Team	—	—	14.866 Q	—	—	13.300	—		Did not advance							
Manuel Helmut Arnold	Team	12.833	13.566	13.000	13.100	12.700	11.633	76.832	45	Did not advance							
Askhab Matiev	Team	12.700	12.533	12.700	13.800	12.800	12.633	77.166	41	Did not advance							
Ricardo Rudy	Team	12.366	13.233	—	13.833	12.700	—	—		Did not advance							
Total	Team	39.033	39.332	40.732	41.433	38.666	39.299	238.495	13	Did not advance							

Individual finals

Athlete	Event	Apparatus						Total	Rank
Athlete	Event	F	PH	R	V	PB	HB	Total	Rank
Vinzenz Höck	Rings	—		14.733	—			14.733	5

=== Women ===
Qualification

Athlete	Event	Qualification						Final					
Athlete	Event	Apparatus				Total	Rank	Apparatus				Total	Rank
Athlete	Event	V	UB	BB	F	Total	Rank	V	UB	BB	F	Total	Rank
Selina Kickinger	Team	12.733	12.600	12.233	11.666	49.232	27	Did not advance					
Carina Kröll	Team	12.566	11.800	12.033	11.700	48.099	39	Did not advance					
Jasmin Mader	Team	12.333	12.066	11.866	12.433	48.698	34	Did not advance					
Alissa Mörz	Team	—	12.100	—				Did not advance					
Charlize Mörz	Team	12.833	—	11.900	11.066	—		Did not advance					
Total	Team	38.132	36.766	36.166	35.799	146.863	11	Did not advance					

== Rowing ==
Men

Athlete	Event	Heats		Repechage		Semifinals		Final	
Athlete	Event	Time	Rank	Time	Rank	Time	Rank	Time	Rank
Christoph Seifriedsberger; Bruno Bachmair	Coxless pair	7:44.90	4 R	7:18.61	2 SA/B	7:41.29	6 FB	7:02.15	11
Rudolph Querfeld; Jakob Stadler; Lorenz Lindorfer; Gabriel Stekl	Coxless four	6:54.46	6 R	6:36.75	4 FB	—		6:16.87	9
Julian Schöberl	Lightweight single sculls	7:51.43	3 SA/B	Bye		7:15.34	3 FA	7:42.90	5

Women

Athlete	Event	Heats		Repechage		Semifinals		Final	
Athlete	Event	Time	Rank	Time	Rank	Time	Rank	Time	Rank
Magdalena Lobnig	Single sculls	8:42.83	1 SA/B	Bye		8:10.36	2 FA	8:10.10	4
Tabea Minichmayr; Katharina Lobnig	Double sculls	8:14.64	5 R	7:56.48	3 SA/B	7:43.82	6 FB	7:28.54	11
Lara Tiefenthaler; Valentina Cavallar	Lightweight double sculls	8:04.97	5 R	7:52.20	5 FB	—		7:45.82	10

== Sport climbing ==
Boulder

Athlete	Event	Qualification		Semifinal		Final	
Athlete	Event	Result	Rank	Result	Rank	Result	Rank
Jan-Luca Posch	Men's boulder	0T2z 0 3	39	Did not advance			
Jakob Schubert	Men's boulder	3T5z 5 14	5 Q	0T3z 0 8	9	Did not advance	
Nicolai Uznik	Men's boulder	3T5z 8 9	1 Q	1T3z 7 9	3 Q	2T2z 6 6	1st place, gold medalist(s)
Johanna Färber	Women's boulder	0T3z 0 7	31	Did not advance			
Eva-Maria Hammermüller	Women's boulder	2T2z 5 3	29	Did not advance			
Sandra Lettner	Women's boulder	2T3z 11 12	27	Did not advance			
Jessica Pilz	Women's boulder	2T4z 5 7	9 Q	2T3z 5 7	8	Did not advance	
Franziska Sterrer	Women's boulder	1T5z 2 14	13 Q	0T2z 0 4	17	Did not advance	

Combined

Athlete	Event	Qualification		Final						
Athlete	Event	Total	Rank	Boulder		Lead			Total	Rank
Athlete	Event	Total	Rank	Points	Place	Hold	Points	Place	Total	Rank
Jakob Schubert	Men's	961.67	5 Q	80.5	4	49+	95.1	1	175.6	1st place, gold medalist(s)
Nicolai Uznik	Men's	1021	4 Q	61.4	6	21+	1.1	8	62.5	8
Eva-Maria Hammermüller	Women's	104	19	Did not advance						
Sandra Lettner	Women's	418	11	Did not advance						
Jessica Pilz	Women's	1220	3 Q	80.6	4	Top	100.0	2	180.6	3rd place, bronze medalist(s)

Lead

Athlete	Event	Qualification								Semifinal			Final		
Athlete	Event	Hold	Time	Rank	Hold	Time	Rank	Points	Rank	Hold	Time	Rank	Hold	Time	Rank
Georg Parma	Men's lead	14+	0:55	=46	17	1:39	=50	48.72	50	Did not advance					
Mathias Posch	Men's lead	22+	2:28	=36	40	5:20	=17	27.22	28	Did not advance					
Stefan Scherz	Men's lead	36+	2:58	=18	17	1:19	=50	30.57	33	Did not advance					
Jakob Schubert	Men's lead	46+	4:01	=3	47+	5:50	=8	6.16	5 Q	46+	5:08	1 Q	34+	3:42	4
Nicolai Uznik	Men's lead	23+	2:16	35	30+	3:17	=34	35.50	37	Did not advance					
Julia Fiser	Women's lead	36	4:07	17	23+	5:32	=30	24.07	22 Q	18+	2:05	20	Did not advance		
Eva-Maria Hammelmüller	Women's lead	35+	3:26	=22	22+	5:05	=34	28.98	29	Did not advance					
Sandra Lettner	Women's lead	35+	4:06	=22	24	2:05	=24	25.22	23 Q	24+	2:47	10	Did not advance		
Jessica Pilz	Women's lead	51	6:00	4	41+	4:42	5	4.47	3 Q	27+	3:05	4 Q	45+	4:46	2nd place, silver medalist(s)
Mattea Pötzi	Women's lead	36	3:40	=17	21	1:43	=39	27.57	26 Q	19+	2:17	17	Did not advance		

Speed

Athlete	Event	Qualification		Round of 16	Quarterfinal	Semifinal	Final	
Athlete	Event	Time	Rank	Opposition Time	Opposition Time	Opposition Time	Opposition Time	Rank
Lawrence Bogeschdorfer	Men's	6.357	15 Q	Boldyrev (UKR); L 6.162	Did not advance			
Lukas Knapp	Men's	6.038	10 Q	Zodda (ITA); L Fall	Did not advance			

== Table tennis ==
Austria entered 5 men and 3 women.

=== Men ===
Athlete	Event	Qualification stage				Preliminary Round 1	Preliminary Round 2	Round of 64	Round of 32	Round of 16	Quarterfinals	Semifinals	Final / BM	
Athlete	Event	Opposition Score	Opposition Score	Opposition Score	Rank	Opposition Score	Opposition Score	Opposition Score	Opposition Score	Opposition Score	Opposition Score	Opposition Score	Opposition Score	Rank
Alexander Chen	Singles	Reinholds (LAT); W 3-0	Piccolin (ITA); L 0-3	Radovic (MNE); W 3-2	2 Q	—	Jevtovic (SRB); L 0-3	Did not advance						65
Robert Gardos	Singles	Bye						Nuytinck (BEL); L 1-4	Did not advance					33
Daniel Habesohn	Singles	Bye						Lind (DEN); W 4-1	Duda (GER); L 3–4	Did not advance				17
Andreas Levenko	Singles	Yılmaz (TUR); W 3–0	Peto (SRB); W 3–2	—	1 Q	Bye		Falck (SWE); L 2–4	Did not advance					33
David Serdaroglu	Singles	Alexandrov (BUL); L 2–3	Martinko (CZE); L 0–3	Karabaxhak (KOS); W 3–0	3	Did not advance								
Alexander Chen; David Serdaroglu	Doubles	—				Bye	Masip / Caballero (ESP); W 3–1	—	Falck / Karlsson (SWE); L 1–3	Did not advance				17
Robert Gardos; Daniel Habesohn	Doubles	—							Chiriță (ROU) / Berzosa (ESP); W 3–2	Širuček / Martinko (CZE); W 3–1	Qiu / Duda (GER); W 3–2	Lebrun / Lebrun (FRA); W 3–1	Falck / Karlsson (SWE); L 1–3	2nd place, silver medalist(s)

=== Women ===
Athlete	Event	Qualification stage				Preliminary Round 1	Preliminary Round 2	Round of 64	Round of 32	Round of 16	Quarterfinals	Semifinals	Final / BM	
Athlete	Event	Opposition Score	Opposition Score	Opposition Score	Rank	Opposition Score	Opposition Score	Opposition Score	Opposition Score	Opposition Score	Opposition Score	Opposition Score	Opposition Score	Rank
Karoline Mischek	Singles	Rodríguez (ESP); W 3–2	Blašková (CZE); W 3–2	—	1 Q	Bye		Altinkaya (TUR); W 4–1	Šurjan (SRB); L 0–4	Did not advance				17
Sofia Polcanova	Singles	Bye						Yılmaz (TUR); W 4–0	Ho (ENG); W 4–1	Partyka (POL); W 4–2	Szőcs (ROU); W 4–2	Winter (GER); W 4–3	Mittelham (GER); W Retired	1st place, gold medalist(s)
Amelie Solja	Singles	Pinto (POR); W 3–0	Tokić (SLO); W 3–0	—	1 Q	Bye		Kukuľková (SVK); L 1–4	Did not advance					33
Karoline Mischek; Tin-Tin Ho (ENG)	Doubles	—				Bye			Malobabić (CRO) / Brateyko (UKR); W 3–2	Matelová (CZE) / Balážová (SVK); L 0–3	Did not advance			9
Sofia Polcanova; Bernadette Szőcs (ROU)	Doubles	—				Bye			Arlia / Monfardini (ITA); W 3–0	Partyka / Bajor (POL); W 3–0	Yu / Shao (POR); W 3–0	Xiao (ESP) / Diaconu (ROU); W 3–0	Samara / Dragoman (ROU); W 3–0	1st place, gold medalist(s)
Amelie Solja; Markéta Ševčíková (CZE)	Doubles	—				Bye	Zhang (ESP) / Degraef (BEL); W 3–0	Bye	Bergand / Muskantor (SWE); L 1–3	Did not advance				17

=== Mixed ===
Athlete	Event	Preliminary Round 1	Preliminary Round 2	Round of 32	Round of 16	Quarterfinals	Semifinals	Final / BM	
Athlete	Event	Opposition Score	Opposition Score	Opposition Score	Opposition Score	Opposition Score	Opposition Score	Opposition Score	Rank
Robert Gardos; Sofia Polcanova	Doubles	Bye		Jarvis / Bardsley (ENG); W 3–1	Qiu / Mittelham (GER); W 3–1	Gauzy / Pavade (FRA); W 3–1	Ionescu / Szőcs (ROU); L 2–3	Did not advance	3rd place, bronze medalist(s)
Daniel Habesohn; Elizabeta Samara (ROU)	Doubles	Bye	Pryshchepa / Bilenko (UKR); W 3–0	Yiğenler / Yılmaz (TUR); W 3–0	Lebesson / Yuan (FRA); L 0–3	Did not advance			9

== Triathlon ==
Athlete	Event	Swim (1.5 km)	Trans 1	Bike (40 km)	Trans 2	Run (10 km)	Total Time	Rank
Tjebbe Kaindl	Men's	18:37	0:30	51:17	0:27	37:13	1:48:04	43
Alois Knabl	Men's	17:39	0:37	51:20	0:24	32:50	1:42:50	11
Leon Pauger	Men's	18:10	0:34	51:38	0:25	32:43	1:43:30	16
Julia Hauser	Women's	20:12	0:36	57:04	0:25	35:49	1:53:41	9
Lisa Perterer	Women's	20:41	0:37	DNF				

=== Mixed ===
Athlete	Event	Swim (300 m)	Trans 1	Bike (6.8 km)	Trans 2	Run (2 km)	Total Group Time	Rank
Therese Feuersinger; Julia Hauser; Alois Knabl; Leon Pauger	Mixed relay	15:27	3:03	46:03	1:45	21:00	1:27:25	6
