= 2022 European Rowing Championships =

2022 European Championships
- Venue: Oberschleißheim Regatta Course
- Location: Oberschleißheim, near Munich, Germany
- Dates: 11–14 August 2022 / 23 Events
- Competitors: 525 from 33 nations

The 2022 European Rowing Championships were held from 11 to 14 August 2022 in Oberschleißheim, near Munich, Germany, as part of the multi-sport 2022 European Championships.

The event constituted 19 events in rowing and 4 in pararowing.

== Medal table ==
* Host nation (Germany)

Rank	Nation	Gold	Silver	Bronze	Total
1	Great Britain	6	3	1	10
2	Romania	5	0	3	8
3	Italy	4	2	3	9
4	Netherlands	2	4	3	9
5	Greece	1	3	0	4
6	Ukraine	1	1	2	4
7	Ireland	1	1	0	2
8	Croatia	1	0	0	1
8	Hungary	1	0	0	1
8	Norway	1	0	0	1
11	France	0	3	0	3
12	Germany*	0	1	2	3
13	Poland	0	1	1	2
13	Spain	0	1	1	2
15	Turkey	0	1	0	1
16	Switzerland	0	0	2	2
17	Bulgaria	0	0	1	1
17	Lithuania	0	0	1	1
Totals (18 entries)		23	21	20	64

== Medal summary ==
=== Men ===
Event	Gold		Silver		Bronze	
Openweight events
M1x	Melvin Twellaar; Netherlands	7:14.72	Stefanos Ntouskos; Greece	7:15.01	Kristian Vasilev; Bulgaria	7:16.37
M2x	Croatia; Martin Sinković; Valent Sinković	6:35.93	Spain; Rodrigo Conde; Aleix García	6:38:46	Lithuania; Armandas Kelmelis; Dovydas Nemeravičius	6:42.11
M4x	Italy; Nicolò Carucci; Andrea Panizza; Luca Chiumento; Giacomo Gentili	6:06.77	Poland; Dominik Czaja; Mateusz Biskup; Mirosław Ziętarski; Fabian Barański	6:07.85	Romania; Mihai Chiruță; Ciprian Tudosă; Ioan Prundeanu; Marian Enache	6:08.27
M2−	Romania; Marius Cozmiuc; Sergiu Bejan	6:44.28	Great Britain; Oliver Wynne-Griffith; Thomas George	6:46.52	Spain; Jaime Canalejo; Javier García Ordóñez	6:49.13
M4−	Great Britain; William Stewart; Sam Nunn; Matthew Aldridge; Freddie Davidson	6:15.43	Netherlands; Ralf Rienks; Ruben Knab; Sander de Graaf; Rik Rienks	6:17.69	Romania; Mihăiță Țigănescu; Mugurel Semciuc; Ștefan Berariu; Florin Lehaci	6:19.49
M8+	Great Britain; Rory Gibbs; Morgan Bolding; David Bewicke-Copley; Sholto Carnegie; Charles Elwes; Thomas Digby; James Rudkin; Thomas Ford; Harry Brightmore (c)	5:49.67	Netherlands; Niki van Sprang; Lennart van Lierop; Abe Wiersma; Jacob van de Kerkhof; Michiel Mantel; Mick Makker; Guus Mollee; Guillaume Krommenhoek; Dieuwke Fetter (c)	5:54.21	Italy; Vincenzo Abbagnale; Cesare Gabbia; Emanuele Gaetani Liseo; Matteo Lodo; Marco Di Costanzo; Matteo Castaldo; Giuseppe Vicino; Leonardo Pietra Caprina; Enrico D'Aniello (c)	5:55.08
Lightweight events
LM1x	Antonios Papakonstantinou; Greece	7:21.84	Gabriel Soares; Italy	7:24.21	Andri Struzina; Switzerland	7:31.23
LM2x	Ireland; Fintan McCarthy; Paul O'Donovan	6:34.72	Italy; Pietro Ruta; Stefano Oppo	6:38.40	Switzerland; Jan Schäuble; Raphaël Ahumada	6:39.67
LM4x	Italy; Antonio Vicino; Martino Goretti; Niels Torre; Patrick Rocek	6:17.83	Not awarded due to only two entrants			
LM2−	Hungary; Bence Szabó; Kálmán Furkó	7:17.04	Turkey; Enes Yenipazarlı; Bayram Sönmez	7:25.55	Not awarded due to only three entrants	
Pararowing events
PR1M1x	Giacomo Perini; Italy	9:38.48	Roman Polianskyi; Ukraine	9:46.44	Benjamin Pritchard; Great Britain	9:53.75

=== Women ===
Event	Gold		Silver		Bronze	
Openweight events
W1x	Karolien Florijn; Netherlands		Evangelia Anastasiadou; Greece		Alexandra Föster; Germany	
W2x	Romania; Ancuța Bodnar; Simona Radiș	7:14.85	Netherlands; Roos de Jong; Laila Youssifou	7:21.84	Italy; Kiri Tontodonati; Stefania Gobbi	7:23.04
W4x	Great Britain; Jessica Leyden; Lola Anderson; Georgina Megan Brayshaw; Lucy Glover	6:49.21	Netherlands; Nika Johanna Vos; Tessa Dullemans; Ilse Kolkman; Bente Paulis	6:52.52	Ukraine; Daryna Verkhohliad; Nataliya Dovhodko; Kateryna Dudchenko; Yevheniya Dovhodko	6:53.76
W2−	Romania; Ioana Vrînceanu; Denisa Tîlvescu	7:34.41	Great Britain; Emily Ford; Esme Booth	7:36.20	Netherlands; Ymkje Clevering; Veronique Meester	7:39.49
W4−	Great Britain; Heidi Long; Rowan McKellar; Samantha Redgrave; Rebecca Shorten	6:50.92	Ireland; Natalie Long; Aifric Keogh; Tara Hanlon; Eimear Lambe	6:52.99	Romania; Mădălina Bereș; Iuliana Buhuș; Magdalena Rusu; Amalia Bereș	6:53.83
W8+	Romania; Magdalena Rusu; Iuliana Buhuș; Ancuța Bodnar; Denisa Tîlvescu; Mădălina Bereș; Amalia Bereș; Ioana Vrînceanu; Simona Radiș; Adrian Munteanu (c)	6:26.38	Great Britain; Rebecca Edwards; Lauren Irwin; Emily Ford; Esme Booth; Samantha Redgrave; Rebecca Shorten; Rowan McKellar; Heidi Long; Morgan Baynham-Williams (c)	6:28.02	Netherlands; Benthe Boonstra; Laila Youssifou; Hermine Drenth; Marloes Oldenburg; Roos de Jong; Tinka Offereins; Ymkje Clevering; Veronique Meester; Aniek van Veenen (c)	6:35.68
Lightweight events
LW1x	Ionela-Livia Cozmiuc; Romania	8:04.41	Zoi Fitsiou; Greece	8:09.21	Martine Veldhuis; Netherlands	8:10.20
LW2x	Great Britain; Emily Craig; Imogen Grant	7:27.82	France; Laura Tarantola; Claire Bove	7:33.33	Italy; Valentina Rodini; Federica Cesarini	7:36.87
LW4x	Italy; Giulia Mignemi; Paola Piazzolla; Silvia Crosio; Arianna Noseda	6:58.48	Not awarded due to only two entrants			
Para-rowing events
PR1 W1x	Birgit Skarstein; Norway	10:59.89	Manuela Diening; Germany	11:07.89	Anna Sheremet; Ukraine	11:18.55

=== Mixed para-rowing events ===
Event	Gold		Silver		Bronze	
PR2Mix2x	Ukraine; Svitlana Bohuslavska; Iaroslav Koiuda	8:53.72	France; Perle Bouge; Stéphane Tardieu	8:57.95	Poland; Jolanta Majka; Michał Gadowski	9:02.88
PR3Mix4+	Great Britain; Francesca Allen; Giedrė Rakauskaitė; Edward Fuller; Oliver Stanhope; Erin Kennedy (c)	7:06.73	France; Erika Sauzeau; Margot Boulet; Jérôme Hamelin; Laurent Cadot; Émilie Acquistapace (c)	7:26.06	Germany; Jan Helmich; Susanne Lackner; Kathrin Marchand; Marc Lembeck; Inga Thöne (c)	7:33.17

== Participating countries ==
- Austria (12)
- Azerbaijan (1)
- Belgium (6)
- Bulgaria (3)
- Croatia (5)
- Czech Republic (17)
- Denmark (19)
- Estonia (7)
- Finland (4)
- France (30)
- Germany (67)
- Great Britain (50)
- Greece (11)
- Hungary (13)
- Ireland (22)
- Israel (3)
- Italy (58)
- Lithuania (13)
- Moldova (2)
- Monaco (1)
- Netherlands (35)
- Norway (20)
- Poland (24)
- Portugal (2)
- Romania (34)
- Serbia (5)
- Slovakia (2)
- Slovenia (7)
- Spain (22)
- Sweden (8)
- Switzerland (24)
- Turkey (4)
- Ukraine (20)
