= Athlete Refugee Team at the 2022 European Championships =

ART at the 2022 European Championships

in Munich
- Competitors: 2 in 1 sport
- Medals: Gold 0 Silver 0 Bronze 0 Total 0

European Championships appearances
- 2018; 2022

Two athletes competed as part of the Athlete Refugee Team at the 2022 European Championships in Munich, Germany, from 11–21 August 2022.

== Competitors ==
=== Sports ===
The following is the list of number of competitors in the Championships:

Sport	Men	Women	Total
Athletics	2	0	2

=== Origin and host NOCs ===
Athlete	Country of origin	Host NOC	Sport	Event
Jamal Abdelmaji Eisa Mohammed	Sudan	Israel	Athletics	Men's 10,000 metres
Tachlowini Gabriyesos	Eritrea	Israel	Athletics	Men's marathon

== Athletics ==
Athlete Refugee Team entered the following athletes.

Athletes	Event	Heats		Semifinal		Final	
Athletes	Event	Result	Rank	Result	Rank	Result	Rank
Jamal Abdelmaji Eisa Mohammed	Men's 10,000 metres	—N/a				DNF	
Tachlowini Gabriyesos	Men's marathon	—N/a				DNF	
