= Poland at the 2022 European Championships =

in (Germany) Munich 11 August 2022 – 22 August 2022
- Competitors: 203 in 12 sports
- Medals Ranked 8th: Gold 8 Silver 16 Bronze 15 Total 39

European Championships appearances
- 2018; 2022

Poland competed at the 2022 European Championships in Munich from August 11 to August 22, 2022.

== Medallists ==
Medal	Name	Sport	Event	Date
Gold	Aleksandra Lisowska	Athletics	Women's marathon	15 August
Gold	Aleksandra Mirosław	Sport climbing	Women's speed	15 August
Gold	Wojciech Nowicki	Athletics	Men's hammer throw	18 August
Gold	Karolina Naja; Anna Puławska	Canoeing	Women's K–2 500 metres	20 August
Gold	Aleksander Kitewski; Arsen Śliwiński	Canoeing	Men's C–2 200 metres	21 August
Gold	Pia Skrzyszowska	Athletics	Women's 100 metres hurdles	21 August
Gold	Anna Puławska	Canoeing	Women's K-1 500 m	21 August
Gold	Karolina Naja; Anna Puławska; Adrianna Kąkol; Dominika Putto	Canoeing	Women's K-4 500 m	21 August
Silver	Dominik Czaja; Mateusz Biskup; Mirosław Ziętarski; Fabian Barański	Rowing	Men's quadruple sculls	13 August
Silver	Aleksandra Kałucka	Sport climbing	Women's speed	15 August
Silver	Marcin Dzieński	Sport climbing	Men's speed	15 August
Silver	Urszula Łoś	Cycling	Women's keirin	16 August
Silver	Natalia Kaczmarek	Athletics	Women's 400 metres	17 August
Silver	Ewa Różańska	Athletics	Women's hammer throw	17 August
Silver	Adrianna Sułek	Athletics	Women's heptathlon	18 August
Silver	Justyna Iskrzycka; Katarzyna Kołodziejczyk	Canoeing	Women's K–2 1000 metres	19 August
Silver	Katarzyna Zdziebło	Athletics	Women's 20 kilometres walk	20 August
Silver	Jakub Stepun; Bartosz Grabowski	Canoeing	Men's K–2 200 metres	20 August
Silver	Anna Kiełbasińska; Iga Baumgart-Witan; Justyna Święty-Ersetic; Natalia Kaczmarek	Athletics	Women's 4 × 400 metres relay	20 August
Silver	Mateusz Surwilo	Canoeing	Men's KL3 200 metres	21 August
Silver	Justyna Iskrzycka	Canoeing	Women's K–1 1000 metres	21 August
Silver	Dominika Putto; Katarzyna Kołodziejczyk	Canoeing	Women's K–2 200 metres	21 August
Silver	Wiktor Głazunow; Tomasz Barniak	Canoeing	Men's C-2 500 metres	21 August
Silver	Pia Skrzyszowska; Anna Kiełbasińska; Marika Popowicz-Drapała; Ewa Swoboda; Magdalena Stefanowicz; Martyna Kotwiła	Athletics	Women's 4 × 100 metres relay	21 August
Bronze	Marlena Karwacka; Urszula Łoś; Nikola Sibiak	Cycling	Women's team sprint	12 August
Bronze	Nikola Wielowska	Cycling	Women's scratch	12 August
Bronze	Jolanta Majka; Michał Gadowski	Rowing	Mixed PR2 double sculls	14 August
Bronze	Monika Jackiewicz; Katarzyna Jankowska; Aleksandra Lisowska; Angelika Mach; Izabela Paszkiewicz	Athletics	Women's marathon team	15 August
Bronze	Natalia Kałucka	Sport climbing	Women's speed	15 August
Bronze	Daria Pikulik	Cycling	Women's omnium	15 August
Bronze	Anna Kiełbasińska	Athletics	Women's 400 metres	17 August
Bronze	Karolina Bronowicz	Canoeing	Women's VL1 200 metres	19 August
Bronze	Sofia Ennaoui	Athletics	Women's 1500 metres	19 August
Bronze	Sylwia Szczerbińska; Julia Walczak	Canoeing	Women's C–2 500 metres	20 August
Bronze	Marta Walczykiewicz	Canoeing	Women's K–1 200 metres	20 August
Bronze	Oleksii Koliadych	Canoeing	Men's C–1 200 metres	20 August
Bronze	Anna Wielgosz	Athletics	Women's 800 metres	20 August
Bronze	Rafał Rosolski	Canoeing	Men's K-1 5000 metres	21 August
Bronze	Adrian Brzeziński; Przemysław Słowikowski; Patryk Wykrota; Dominik Kopeć; Mateusz Siuda	Athletics	Men's 4 × 100 metres relay	21 August

== Competitors ==
The following is the list of number of competitors in the Championships:

Sport	Men	Women	Total
Athletics	39	41	80
Beach volleyball	4	2	6
Gymnastics (men and women)	1	2	3
Canoe sprint	17	15	32
Cycling BMX	2	0	2
Cycling mountain bike	4	4	8
Cycling road	7	6	13
Cycling track	8	9	17
Rowing	15	9	24
Sport climbing	1	5	6
Table tennis	4	4	8
Triathlon	2	2	4
Total	104	99	203

== Athletics ==
Poland entered the following athletes.

Key

- Q = Qualified for the next round
- q = Qualified for the next round as a fastest loser or, in field events, by position without achieving the qualifying target
- NR = National record
- PB = Personal best
- SB = Season best
- N/A = Round not applicable for the event

=== Men ===
Track and road events

Athlete	Event	Heat		Semifinal		Final	
Athlete	Event	Result	Rank	Result	Rank	Result	Rank
Dominik Kopeć	100 m	10.30	4 Q	10.23	15	Did not advance	
Przemysław Słowikowski	100 m	10.35	11 Q	10.24 SB	16	Did not advance	
Adrian Brzeziński	100 m	10.46	15	Did not advance			
Łukasz Żok	200 m	20.78	8 Q	20.93	21	Did not advance	
Patryk Wykrota	200 m	20.81	10 q	22.84	23	Did not advance	
Karol Zalewski	400 m	Bye		45.52	5 q	45.62	6
Patryk Dobek	800 m	1:47.49	9 Q	1:48.63	12	Did not advance	
Mateusz Borkowski	800 m	1:47.74	19	Did not advance			
Kacper Lewalski	800 m	1:48.43	29	Did not advance			
Michał Rozmys	1500 m	3:37.36	1 Q	—		3:37.63	7
Jakub Szymański	110 m hurdles	13.87	13 Q	13.66	13	Did not advance	
Damian Czykier	110 m hurdles	Bye		13.99	22	Did not advance	
Krzysztof Hołub	400 m hurdles	50.12 =PB	11	Did not advance			
Sebastian Urbaniak	400 m hurdles	50.69	16	Did not advance			
Jakub Olejniczak	400 m hurdles	51.77	23	Did not advance			
Adam Nowicki	Marathon	—				2:15:21 SB	18
Arkadiusz Gardzielewski	Marathon	—				2:21:34	49
Kamil Karbowiak	Marathon	—				2:21:48 SB	51
Kamil Jastrzębski	Marathon	—				DNF	
Adam Nowicki; Arkadiusz Gardzielewski; Kamil Karbowiak; Kamil Jastrzębski	Marathon Cup	—				6:58:43	10
Artur Brzozowski	35 km walk	—				DNF	
Adrian Brzeziński; Przemysław Słowikowski; Patryk Wykrota; Dominik Kopeć; Mateusz Siuda^{[a]}	4 × 100 m relay	38.60 SB	4 Q	—		38.15 NR	3rd place, bronze medalist(s)
Szymon Dziuba; Tymoteusz Zimny; Mateusz Rzeźniczak; Karol Zalewski	4 × 400 m relay	3:02.95	9	—		Did not advance	

Field events

Athlete	Event	Qualification		Final	
Athlete	Event	Distance	Position	Distance	Position
Piotr Lisek	Pole vault	5.50	15	Did not advance	
Robert Sobera	Pole vault	5.50	15	Did not advance	
Piotr Tarkowski	Long jump	NM		Did not advance	
Adrian Świderski	Triple jump	15.97	16	Did not advance	
Konrad Bukowiecki	Shot put	20.96	3 q	20.74	6
Michał Haratyk	Shot put	20.85	4 q	20.90	5
Jakub Szyszkowski	Shot put	19.19	21	Did not advance	
Oskar Stachnik	Discus throw	62.52	9 q	60.36	12
Robert Urbanek	Discus throw	60.47	17	Did not advance	
Paweł Fajdek	Hammer throw	79.76	1 Q	79.15	4
Wojciech Nowicki	Hammer throw	78.78	2 Q	82.00 WL	1st place, gold medalist(s)
Marcin Wrotyński	Hammer throw	71.86	13	Did not advance	

Combined events – Decathlon

Athlete	Event	100 m	LJ	SP	HJ	400 m	110H	DT	PV	JT	1500 m	Final	Rank
Paweł Wiesiołek	Result	11.07	7.45 SB	15.11 SB	2.02 SB	49.88 SB	15.32 SB	42.84 SB	4.80 SB	DNS		DNF	
Paweł Wiesiołek	Points	845	922	796	822	820	811	722	849	DNS		DNF	

=== Women ===
Track and road events

Athlete	Event	Heat		Semifinal		Final	
Athlete	Event	Result	Rank	Result	Rank	Result	Rank
Magdalena Stefanowicz	100 m	11.44	6 Q	11.43	14	Did not advance	
Ewa Swoboda	100 m	Bye		11.22	5 Q	11.18	4
Nikola Horowska	200 m	23.32	11 q	23.62	20	Did not advance	
Marika Popowicz-Drapała	200 m	23.47	17	Did not advance			
Iga Baumgart-Witan	400 m	51.09 SB	1 Q	51.17	8 q	51.28	8
Natalia Kaczmarek	400 m	Bye		50.40	1 Q	49.94	2nd place, silver medalist(s)
Anna Kiełbasińska	400 m	Bye		50.45	2 Q	50.29	3rd place, bronze medalist(s)
Adrianna Czapla	800 m	2:01.89	6 q	2:04.15	15	Did not advance	
Anna Wielgosz	800 m	2:02.77	11 Q	2:01.05	6 Q	1:59.87	3rd place, bronze medalist(s)
Angelika Sarna	800 m	2:04.12	23 Q	2:02.15	14	Did not advance	
Sofia Ennaoui	1500 m	4:02.73	1 Q	—		4:03.59	3rd place, bronze medalist(s)
Eliza Megger	1500 m	4:07.56	16	—		Did not advance	
Aleksandra Lisowska	Marathon	—				2:28:36 SB	1st place, gold medalist(s)
Angelika Mach	Marathon	—				2:35:03 SB	19
Monika Jackiewicz	Marathon	—				2:37:15	26
Izabela Paszkiewicz	Marathon	—				DNF	
Katarzyna Jankowska	Marathon	—				DNF	
Aleksandra Lisowska; Angelika Mach; Monika Jackiewicz; Izabela Paszkiewicz; Katarzyna Jankowska	Marathon Cup	—				7:40:54	3rd place, bronze medalist(s)
Klaudia Wojtunik	100 m hurdles	13.40	13 Q	13.03	11	Did not advance	
Pia Skrzyszowska	100 m hurdles	Bye		12.66	2 Q	12.53	1st place, gold medalist(s)
Klaudia Siciarz	100 m hurdles	Bye		13.00	10	Did not advance	
Alicja Konieczek	3000 m steeplechase	9:33.54 SB	3 q	—		9:25.15 SB	4
Patrycja Kapała	3000 m steeplechase	9:59.46	22	—		Did not advance	
Katarzyna Zdziebło	20 km walk	—				1:29:20	2nd place, silver medalist(s)
Olga Niedziałek	35 km walk	—				2:53:12	5
Pia Skrzyszowska; Anna Kiełbasińska; Marika Popowicz-Drapała; Ewa Swoboda; Magdalena Stefanowicz^{[a]} Martyna Kotwiła^{[a]}	4 × 100 m relay	43.49	6 Q	—		42.61 NR	2nd place, silver medalist(s)
Anna Kiełbasińska; Iga Baumgart-Witan; Justyna Święty-Ersetic; Natalia Kaczmarek; Kinga Gacka^{[a]} Małgorzata Hołub-Kowalik^{[a]}	4 × 400 m relay	3:26.05 SB	4	—		3:21.68 SB	2nd place, silver medalist(s)

Field events

Athlete	Event	Qualification		Final	
Athlete	Event	Distance	Position	Distance	Position
Anna Matuszewicz	Long jump	5.93	21	Did not advance	
Adrianna Szóstak	Triple jump	13.36	19	Did not advance	
Karolina Młodawska	Triple jump	12.87	21	Did not advance	
Klaudia Kardasz	Shot put	17.27	14	Did not advance	
Paulina Guba	Shot put	16.66	20	Did not advance	
Daria Zabawska	Discus throw	56.54	15	Did not advance	
Karolina Urban	Discus throw	54.33	23	Did not advance	
Ewa Różańska	Hammer throw	68.26	8 q	72.12 PB	2nd place, silver medalist(s)
Katarzyna Furmanek	Hammer throw	67.62	14	Did not advance	
Malwina Kopron	Hammer throw	NM		Did not advance	

Combined events – Heptathlon

Athlete	Event	100H	HJ	SP	200 m	LJ	JT	800 m	Final	Rank
Adrianna Sułek	Result	13.94	1.89	14.18 PB	24.54	6.55 PB	42.86 PB	2:09.49	6532	2nd place, silver medalist(s)
Adrianna Sułek	Points	987	1093	806	929	1023	722	972	6532	2nd place, silver medalist(s)
Paulina Ligarska	Result	14.22	1.77	13.78	24.72	6.00	43.94	2:13.32	6090	9
Paulina Ligarska	Points	947	941	779	913	850	743	917	6090	9

^{a} Athletes who participated in the heats only.

== Beach Volleyball ==
Norway has qualified 2 male pairs.

Athlete	Event	Preliminary round			Round of 24	Round of 16	Quarterfinals	Semifinals	Final / BM	
Athlete	Event	Opposition Score	Opposition Score	Rank	Opposition Score	Opposition Score	Opposition Score	Opposition Score	Opposition Score	Rank
Michał Bryl; Bartosz Łosiak	Men's	Winter – Henning (GER)								
Piotr Kantor; Maciej Rudol	Men's	Samoilovs – Šmēdiņš (LAT)								

== Cycling ==
=== Road ===
Men

Athlete	Event	Time	Rank
Stanisław Aniołkowski	Road race	4:38:49	15
Alan Banaszek	Road race	DNF	
Norbert Banaszek	Road race	4:42:20	106
Cesare Benedetti	Road race	4:39:10	56
Maciej Bodnar	Road race	4:38:57	31
Jakub Kaczmarek	Road race	4:39:07	39
Filip Maciejuk	Road race	4:39:07	50

== Gymnastics ==
Poland has entered two male and three female athletes.

=== Men ===
Qualification

Athlete	Qualification						Total	Rank
Athlete	Apparatus						Total	Rank
Athlete	F	PH	R	V	PB	HB	Total	Rank
Kacper Garnczarek								
Sebastian Gawroński								

=== Women ===
Qualification

Athlete	Event	Qualification						Final					
Athlete	Event	Apparatus				Total	Rank	Apparatus				Total	Rank
Athlete	Event	V	UB	BB	F	Total	Rank	V	UB	BB	F	Total	Rank
Emilia Kulczyńska	Team											—	
Wiktoria Łopuszańska	Team											—	
Brygida Urbańska	Team											—	
Total	Team												

== Triathlon ==
Athlete	Event	Swim (1.5 km)	Trans 1	Bike (40 km)	Trans 2	Run (10 km)	Total Time	Rank
Maciej Bruździak	Men's							
Michał Oliwa	Men's							
Marcin Stanglewicz	Men's							
Paulina Klimas	Women's							
Roksana Słupek	Women's							
Zuzanna Sudak	Women's							

=== Mixed ===
Athlete	Event	Swim (300 m)	Trans 1	Bike (6.8 km)	Trans 2	Run (2 km)	Total Group Time	Rank
	Mixed relay							
