= 2022 European Artistic Gymnastics Championships =

2022 European Artistic Gymnastics Championships may refer to:

- 2022 European Men's Artistic Gymnastics Championships;
- 2022 European Women's Artistic Gymnastics Championships,

both of which were held in Munich as part of the 2022 European Championships.
