= 2022 European Championships =

Multi-sport European championship

- Host: Munich, Germany
- Nations: 50
- Sport: 9
- Events: 176
- Dates: 11–21 August
- Website: https://www.munich2022.com/en

The 2022 European Championships were the second and final edition of the European Championships. It was a multi-sport event which took place in Munich, Germany from 11 to 21 August 2022.

Athletics, cycling, triathlon, women's artistic gymnastics, men's artistic gymnastics and rowing returned after appearing in the inaugural Championships in 2018. New to this edition of the Championships were beach volleyball, canoe sprint, and, for the first time, a full slate of para-sport events, sport climbing and table tennis.

Unlike the 2018 European Championships, swimming, diving, artistic swimming and open water swimming were not part of the program of the event, as the European Aquatics Championships were held at the same time but in Rome, Italy. Golf, in the form of the European Golf Team Championships, did not return for this edition.

== Venues ==
- Olympiastadion – athletics (track & field events)
- Odeonsplatz – athletics (marathon & race walking)
- Königsplatz – beach volleyball, sport climbing
- Oberschleißheim Regatta Course – canoe sprint, rowing
- Messe München – cycling (track)
- Murnau am Staffelsee – cycling (men's road race)
- Fürstenfeldbruck – cycling (road time trial)
- Landsberg am Lech – cycling (women's road race)
- Olympiapark – cycling (BMX freestyle, mountain bike), triathlon
- Olympiahalle – artistic gymnastics
- Rudi-Sedlmayer-Halle – table tennis

== Calendar ==
The schedule was as follows:

All times and dates use Central European Summer Time (UTC+2)

OC	Opening ceremony	●	Event competitions	1	Gold medal events	CC	Closing ceremony

August 2022		11th Thu	12th Fri	13th Sat	14th Sun	15th Mon	16th Tue	17th Wed	18th Thu	19th Fri	20th Sat	21st Sun	Events
Ceremonies		OC										CC	—N/a
Athletics						7	8	6	6	8	8	7	50
Beach volleyball						●	●	●	●	●	1	1	2
Canoe sprint									●	11	9	21	41
Cycling	BMX freestyle	●	1	1									2
Cycling	Mountain biking									1	1		2
Cycling	Road cycling				1			2				1	4
Cycling	Track cycling	●	6	5	3	4	4						22
Artistic gymnastics		1		1	4				1		1	6	14
Rowing		●	●	11	12								23
Sport climbing		●	●	2	2	2		1	1				8
Table tennis				●	●	1	●	●	2	●	●	2	5
Triathlon			1	1	1								3
Total gold medal events		1	8	21	23	14	12	9	10	20	20	38	176
Cumulative total		1	9	30	53	67	79	88	98	118	138	176	176

== Medal table ==
* Host nation (Germany)

Rank	Nation	Gold	Silver	Bronze	Total
1	Germany*	26	20	14	60
2	Great Britain & N.I.	24	19	17	60
3	Italy	14	18	19	51
4	France	11	17	22	50
5	Hungary	11	7	5	23
6	Spain	9	11	12	32
7	Netherlands	9	7	12	28
8	Poland	8	16	15	39
9	Romania	8	2	5	15
10	Greece	6	4	0	10
11	Ukraine	5	8	9	22
12	Norway	5	1	3	9
13	Austria	4	2	2	8
13	Portugal	4	2	2	8
15	Switzerland	3	5	6	14
16	Slovenia	3	5	2	10
17	Czech Republic	3	4	3	10
18	Belgium	3	3	4	10
19	Sweden	3	2	4	9
20	Croatia	3	1	3	7
21	Lithuania	2	2	3	7
22	Israel	2	1	3	6
23	Finland	2	1	1	4
24	Turkey	1	4	3	8
25	Denmark	1	3	3	7
26	Ireland	1	2	1	4
26	Serbia	1	2	1	4
28	Armenia	1	1	0	2
28	Latvia	1	1	0	2
30	Albania	1	0	0	1
30	Cyprus	1	0	0	1
32	Slovakia	0	1	1	2
33	Moldova	0	1	0	1
33	Montenegro	0	1	0	1
35	Bulgaria	0	0	1	1
35	Estonia	0	0	1	1
35	Luxembourg	0	0	1	1
Totals (37 entries)		176	174	178	528

== Results and standings ==
Official results and standings: ec2022results.com

== Participating teams ==
As a result of the 2022 Russian invasion of Ukraine, athletes from Russia and Belarus were banned from competing at the 2022 European Championships. Two athletes participated as the Athlete Refugee Team. The five British competitors in table tennis were listed as representing England. One athlete was listed as representing World Triathlon.

The official list of participating teams was as follows:

1. Albania (5)
2. Andorra (1)
3. Armenia (16)
4. Athlete Refugee Team (2)
5. Austria (109)
6. Azerbaijan (12)
7. Belgium (129)
8. Bosnia and Herzegovina (8)
9. Bulgaria (30)
10. Croatia (39)
11. Cyprus (16)
12. Czech Republic (166)
13. Denmark (106)
14. England (5)
15. Estonia (38)
16. Finland (107)
17. France (245)
18. Georgia (15)
19. Germany (342)
20. Gibraltar (2)
21. Great Britain & N.I. (252)
22. Greece (75)
23. Greenland (GRL) (1)
24. Hungary (142)
25. Iceland (17)
26. Ireland (88)
27. Israel (72)
28. Italy (291)
29. Kosovo (6)
30. Latvia (52)
31. Lithuania (73)
32. Luxembourg (17)
33. Malta (4)
34. Moldova (17)
35. Monaco (2)
36. Montenegro (6)
37. Netherlands (180)
38. North Macedonia (10)
39. Norway (119)
40. Poland (203)
41. Portugal (106)
42. Romania (89)
43. San Marino (4)
44. Serbia (51)
45. Slovakia (76)
46. Slovenia (76)
47. Spain (236)
48. Sweden (107)
49. Switzerland (153)
50. Turkey (73)
51. Ukraine (157)
52. World Triathlon (1)

== See also ==
- Munich 2022 (disambiguation)
