= Immers =

Immers is a surname. Notable people with the surname include:

- Lex Immers (born 1986), Dutch footballer
- Ted Immers (1941–2024), Dutch footballer
