= 2022 European Triathlon Championships =

2022 European Championships
- Venue: Olympiapark
- Location: Munich, Germany
- Dates: 12–14 August

The 2022 European Triathlon Championships was held from 12 to 14 August 2022 in Munich, Germany. For the second time, the event was part of 2022 European Championships multi event.

== Medal table ==
* Host nation (Germany)

| Rank | Nation | Gold | Silver | Bronze | Total |
|---|---|---|---|---|---|
| 1 | France (FRA) | 2 | 1 | 2 | 5 |
| 2 | Great Britain (GBR) | 1 | 0 | 0 | 1 |
| 3 | Germany (GER)* | 0 | 2 | 0 | 2 |
| 4 | Switzerland (SUI) | 0 | 0 | 1 | 1 |
| Totals (4 entries) | | 3 | 3 | 3 | 9 |

== Medallists ==
| Event | Gold | Silver | Bronze |
|---|---|---|---|
| Men's individual | Léo Bergère; France | Pierre Le Corre; France | Dorian Coninx; France |
| Women's individual | Non Stanford; Great Britain | Laura Lindemann; Germany | Emma Lombardi; France |
| Mixed relay | France; Léo Bergère; Emma Lombardi; Dorian Coninx; Cassandre Beaugrand | Germany; Valentin Wernz; Nina Eim; Simon Henseleit; Laura Lindemann | Switzerland; Max Studer; Cathia Schär; Simon Westermann; Julie Derron |

== Participating countries ==
- Austria (6)
- Azerbaijan (1)
- Belgium (6)
- Croatia (1)
- Denmark (4)
- Estonia (4)
- Finland (1)
- France (7)
- Germany (13)
- Great Britain (11)
- Hungary (8)
- Israel (6)
- Italy (10)
- Latvia (2)
- Lithuania (2)
- Luxembourg (2)
- Netherlands (7)
- Norway (6)
- Poland (4)
- Portugal (8)
- Serbia (1)
- Slovakia (4)
- Spain (8)
- Sweden (4)
- Switzerland (6)
- Turkey (3)
- Ukraine (4)
- World Triathlon (1)
