= 2022 Canoe Sprint European Championships =

2022 European Championships
- Venue: Oberschleißheim Regatta Course
- Location: Munich, Germany
- Dates: 18–21 August

The 2022 Canoe Sprint European Championships (32nd) was held from 18 to 21 August 2022 in Munich, Germany. Event was part of 2022 European Championships multi event.

== Medal table ==
* Host nation (Germany)

Rank	Nation	Gold	Silver	Bronze	Total
1	Hungary	9	4	4	17
2	Germany*	8	3	5	16
3	Spain	5	7	3	15
4	Great Britain	5	3	3	11
5	Poland	4	6	5	15
6	Italy	2	4	3	9
7	Portugal	2	1	2	5
8	Ukraine	1	4	3	8
9	Lithuania	1	1	2	4
10	Denmark	1	1	1	3
11	Czech Republic	1	1	0	2
12	Romania	1	0	1	2
13	France	0	1	3	4
14	Belgium	0	1	1	2
14	Slovenia	0	1	1	2
16	Latvia	0	1	0	1
16	Moldova	0	1	0	1
16	Slovakia	0	1	0	1
19	Croatia	0	0	2	2
20	Sweden	0	0	1	1
Totals (20 entries)		40	41	40	121

== Medallists ==
=== Men ===
Event	Gold		Silver		Bronze	
C-1 200 m	Henrikas Žustautas; Lithuania	39.832	Pablo Graña; Spain	39.894	Oleksii Koliadych; Poland	40.166
C-1 500 m	Martin Fuksa; Czech Republic	1:47.183	Serghei Tarnovschi; Moldova	1:48.160	Cătălin Chirilă; Romania	1:48.364
C-1 1000 m	Cătălin Chirilă; Romania	3:49.681	Martin Fuksa; Czech Republic	3:50.032	Carlo Tacchini; Italy	3:51.637
C-1 5000 m	Sebastian Brendel; Germany	22:50.803	Balázs Adolf; Hungary	22:52.684	Carlo Tacchini; Italy	23:13.346
C-2 200 m	Poland; Aleksander Kitewski; Arsen Śliwiński	36.919	Spain; Antoni Segura; Alfonso Benavides Lithuania; Henrikas Žustautas; Vadim Korobov	37.592	Not awarded	
C-2 500 m	Spain; Joan Antoni Moreno; Adrian Sieiro	1:44.822	Poland; Wiktor Głazunow; Tomasz Barniak	1:45.499	Germany; Sebastian Brendel; Tim Hecker	1:45.510
C-2 1000 m	Germany; Sebastian Brendel; Tim Hecker	3:32.896	Italy; Nicolae Craciun; Daniele Santini	3:34.317	Hungary; Balázs Adolf; Dániel Fejes	3:34.585
K-1 200 m	Kevin Santos; Portugal	36.975	Roberts Akmens; Latvia	37.028	Petter Menning; Sweden	37.055
K-1 500 m	Jacob Schopf; Germany	1:38.012	Ádám Varga; Hungary	1:38.237	Fernando Pimenta; Portugal	1:38.803
K-1 1000 m	Bálint Kopasz; Hungary	3:29.898	Fernando Pimenta; Portugal	3:31.964	Artuur Peters; Belgium	3:32.401
K-1 5000 m	Fernando Pimenta; Portugal	20:14.447	Walter Bouzán; Spain	20:17.659	Rafał Rosolski; Poland	20:44.717
K-2 200 m	Italy; Manfredi Rizza; Andrea Di Liberto	31.662	Poland; Jakub Stepun; Bartosz Grabowski	31.673	Lithuania; Artūras Seja; Ignas Navakauskas	31.678
K-2 500 m	Hungary; Bence Nádas; Bálint Kopasz	1:31.141	Germany; Felix Frank; Moritz Florstedt	1:31.434	Lithuania; Mindaugas Maldonis; Andrej Olijnik	1:32.210
K-2 1000 m	Germany; Martin Hiller; Tamás Grossmann	3:13.812	Spain; Francisco Cubelos; Iñigo Peña	3:14.505	Italy; Samuele Burgo; Andrea Schera	3:15.062
K-4 500 m	Germany; Max Rendschmidt; Tom Liebscher; Jacob Schopf; Max Lemke	1:20.282	Slovakia; Samuel Baláž; Denis Myšák; Csaba Zalka; Adam Botek	1:20.877	France; Guillaume Burger; Maxime Beaumont; Quilian Koch; Guillaume Le Floch	1:20.902
K-4 1000 m	Germany; Tobias-Pascal Schultz; Tom Liebscher; Martin Hiller; Felix Frank	2:53.174	Spain; Francisco Cubelos; Roi Rodríguez; Pedro Vázquez; Iñigo Peña	2:53.627	Hungary; Mark Mizser; Kornél Béke; Csaba Erdőssy; Tamás Erdélyi	2:55.748

=== Women ===
Event	Gold		Silver		Bronze	
C-1 200 m	Antía Jácome; Spain	48.642	Liudmyla Luzan; Ukraine	49.271	Vanesa Tot; Croatia	49.489
C-1 500 m	María Corbera; Spain	2:03.586	Liudmyla Luzan; Ukraine	2:05.096	Vanesa Tot; Croatia	2:06.682
C-1 5000 m	María Corbera; Spain	25:46.953	Annika Loske; Germany	26:42.746	Liudmyla Babak; Ukraine	26:48.788
C-2 200 m	Hungary; Giada Bragato; Bianka Nagy	44.066	Spain; Antía Jácome; María Corbera	44.118	Germany; Lisa Jahn; Sophie Koch	44.879
C-2 500 m	Ukraine; Liudmyla Luzan; Anastasiia Chetverikova	1:57.672	Hungary; Giada Bragato; Bianka Nagy	1:58.924	Poland; Sylwia Szczerbińska; Julia Walczak	1:59.572
K-1 200 m	Emma Jørgensen; Denmark	39.848	Anja Osterman; Slovenia	40.061	Marta Walczykiewicz; Poland	40.134
K-1 500 m	Anna Puławska; Poland	1:53.881	Eszter Rendessy; Hungary	1:54.981	Emma Jørgensen; Denmark Anja Osterman; Slovenia	1:55.206
K-1 1000 m	Noémi Pupp; Hungary	4:00.276	Justyna Iskrzycka; Poland	4:00.542	Isabel Contreras; Spain	4:01.419
K-1 5000 m	Emese Kőhalmi; Hungary	22:54.862	Susanna Cicali; Italy	22:55.712	Eva Barrios; Spain	22:55.775
K-2 200 m	Hungary; Blanka Kiss; Anna Lucz	37.352	Poland; Katarzyna Kołodziejczyk; Dominika Putto	37.568	Germany; Jule Hake; Paulina Paszek	38.690
K-2 500 m	Poland; Karolina Naja; Anna Puławska	1:41.418	Belgium; Hermien Peters; Lize Broekx	1:42.230	Germany; Paulina Paszek; Jule Hake	1:42.702
K-2 1000 m	Hungary; Emese Kőhalmi; Eszter Rendessy	3:33.942	Poland; Justyna Iskrzycka; Katarzyna Kołodziejczyk	3:34.606	Spain; Laia Pèlachs; Begoña Lazkano	3:36.942
K-4 500 m	Poland; Karolina Naja; Anna Puławska; Adrianna Kąkol; Dominika Putto	1:35.251	Denmark; Frederikke Matthiesen; Sara Milthers; Pernille Knudsen; Bolette Iversen	1:37.709	Hungary; Blanka Kiss; Anna Lucz; Zsóka Csikós; Alida Dóra Gazsó	1:37.752

== Paracanoe ==
=== Medal events ===
Non-Paralympic classes

Event	Gold		Silver		Bronze	
Men's KL1	Péter Pál Kiss; Hungary	46.400	Esteban Farias; Italy	47.404	Rémy Boullé; France	48.066
Men's KL2	Federico Mancarella; Italy	41.729	Mykola Syniuk; Ukraine	42.224	David Phillipson; Great Britain	42.698
Men's KL3	Juan Antonio Valle; Spain	40.939	Mateusz Surwilo; Poland	41.466	Jonathan Young; Great Britain	42.006
Men's VL1 (Note: Not included in the medal table due to lack of participation)	Alessio Bedin; Italy	1:05.534	None awarded as only 1 boat competed			
Men's VL2	Tamás Juhász; Hungary	53.948	Higinio Rivero; Spain	55.159	Norberto Mourão; Portugal	55.472
Men's VL3	Jack Eyers; Great Britain	47.214	Vladyslav Yepifanov; Ukraine	48.932	Eddie Potdevin; France	49.104
Women's KL1	Edina Müller; Germany	52.776	Eleonora De Paolis; Italy	54.371	Maryna Mazhula; Ukraine	54.659
Women's KL2	Emma Wiggs; Great Britain	47.845	Charlotte Henshaw; Great Britain	49.887	Katalin Varga; Hungary	50.826
Women's KL3	Laura Sugar; Great Britain	47.443	Nélia Barbosa; France	47.784	Hope Gordon; Great Britain	48.264
Women's VL1	Lillemor Köper; Germany	1:20.886	Esther Bode; Germany	1:22.677	Karolina Bronowicz; Poland	1:30.762
Women's VL2	Emma Wiggs; Great Britain	56.036	Jeanette Chippington; Great Britain	1:01.034	Katharina Bauernschmidt; Germany	1:04.521
Women's VL3	Charlotte Henshaw; Great Britain	57.020	Hope Gordon; Great Britain	57.190	Nataliia Lagutenko; Ukraine	1:01.922

== Participating countries ==
- Armenia (7)
- Austria (5)
- Belgium (6)
- Bosnia and Herzegovina (1)
- Bulgaria (5)
- Croatia (3)
- Cyprus (1)
- Czech Republic (27)
- Denmark (11)
- Estonia (3)
- Finland (6)
- France (20)
- Georgia (7)
- Germany (32)
- Great Britain (30)
- Greece (2)
- Hungary (43)
- Ireland (2)
- Israel (14)
- Italy (27)
- Latvia (16)
- Lithuania (11)
- Luxembourg (1)
- Moldova (5)
- North Macedonia (2)
- Norway (9)
- Poland (32)
- Portugal (22)
- Romania (6)
- Serbia (18)
- Slovakia (17)
- Slovenia (3)
- Spain (43)
- Sweden (15)
- Switzerland (1)
- Turkey (6)
- Ukraine (31)
