= Monaco at the 2022 European Championships =

in (Germany) Munich 11 August 2022 – 22 August 2022
- Competitors: 2 in 2 sports
- Medals: Gold 0 Silver 0 Bronze 0 Total 0

European Championships appearances
- 2018; 2022

Monaco competed at the 2022 European Championships in Munich from August 11 to August 22, 2022.

== Competitors ==
The following is the list of number of competitors in the Championships:

Sport	Men	Women	Total
Gymnastics	0	1	1
Rowing	1	0	1
Total	1	1	2

== Gymnastics ==
Monaco entered one female gymnast.

=== Women ===
Qualification

Athlete	Qualification					
Athlete	Apparatus				Total	Rank
Athlete	V	UB	BB	F	Total	Rank
Joana de Freitas	11.566	8.966	10.000	10.433	40.965	82

== Rowing ==
Athlete	Event	Heats		Repechage		Semifinals		Final		Overall rank
Athlete	Event	Time	Rank	Time	Rank	Time	Rank	Time	Rank	Overall rank
Quentin Antognelli	M1x	8:01.87	3 R	7:48.82	1 SA/B	7:44.65	5 FB	7:31.08	2	8
