= 2022 UEC European Track Championships – Men's elimination race =

Men's elimination race at the 2022 UEC European Track Championships
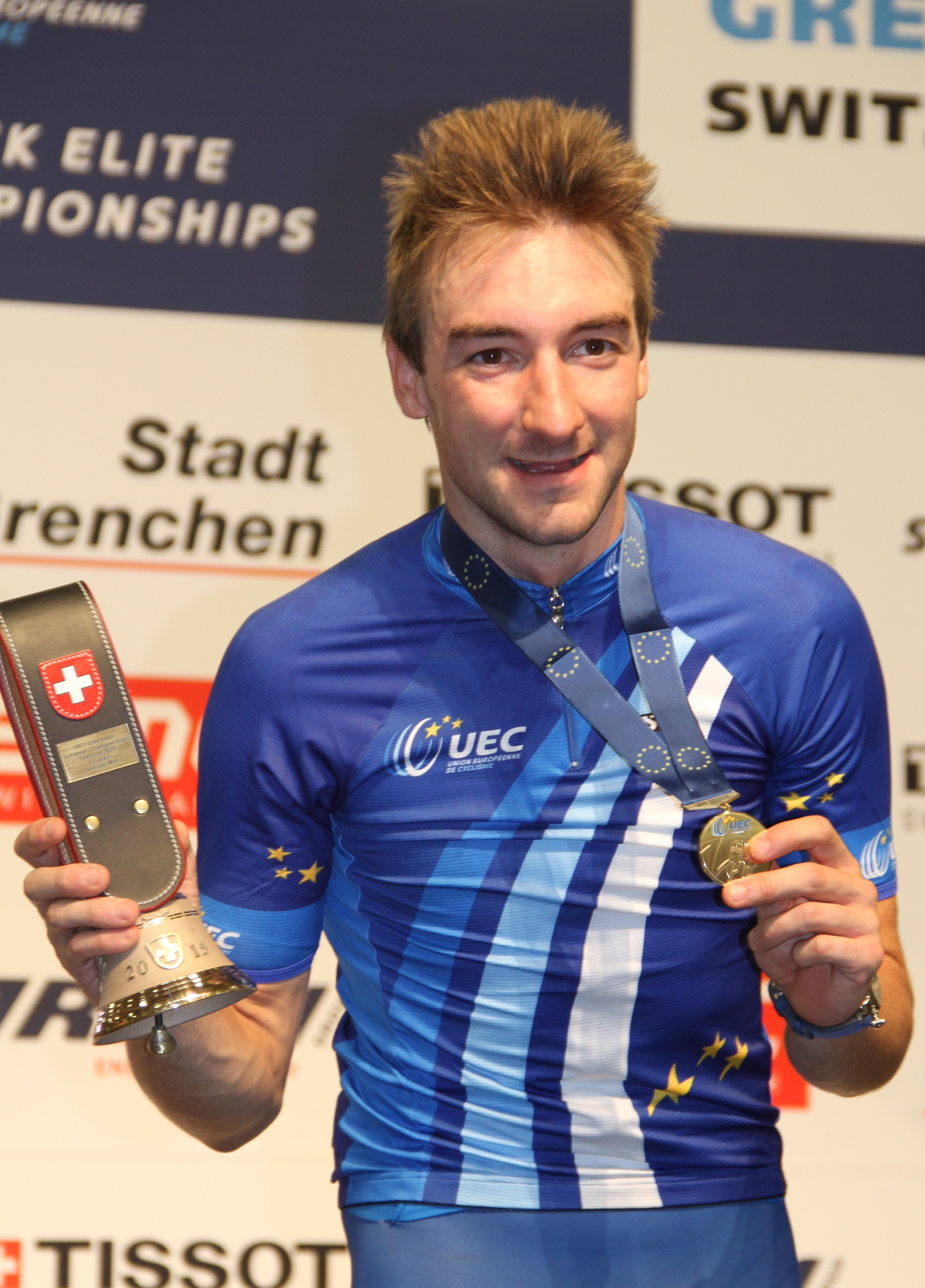
- Elia Viviani, winner despite having completed the road race only five hours earlier.
- Venue: Messe München, Munich
- Date: 14 August
- Competitors: 16 from 16 nations

Medalists
gold medal	Elia Viviani	Italy
silver medal	Theo Reinhardt	Germany
bronze medal	Jules Hesters	Belgium

The men's elimination race competition at the 2022 UEC European Track Championships was held on 14 August 2022.

== Results ==
Rank	Name	Nation
1st place, gold medalist(s)	Elia Viviani	Italy
2nd place, silver medalist(s)	Theo Reinhardt	Germany
3rd place, bronze medalist(s)	Jules Hesters	Belgium
4	Yoeri Havik	Netherlands
5	William Tidball	Great Britain
6	Daniel Staniszewski	Poland
7	Alex Vogel	Switzerland
8	Valentin Tabellion	France
9	Tobias Hansen	Denmark
10	Pavol Rovder	Slovakia
11	Erik Martorell	Spain
12	Jan Voneš	Czech Republic
13	Daniel Dias	Portugal
14	Maksym Vasyliev	Ukraine
15	Rotem Tene	Israel
16	Gergő Orosz	Hungary
