= 2022 European Table Tennis Championships =

- Date: 13–21 August 2022
- Location: Munich, Germany
- Venue: Rudi-Sedlmayer-Halle
- European Table Tennis Championships

The 2022 European Table Tennis Championships were held in Munich, Germany, from 13 to 21 August 2022, as part of the 2022 European Championships.

== Medalists ==
| Event | Gold | Silver | Bronze |
|---|---|---|---|
| Men's singles | Dang Qiu; Germany | Darko Jorgić; Slovenia | Mattias Falck; Sweden Kristian Karlsson; Sweden |
| Women's singles | Sofia Polcanova; Austria | Nina Mittelham; Germany | Shan Xiaona; Germany Sabine Winter; Germany |
| Men's doubles | Sweden; Mattias Falck; Kristian Karlsson | Austria; Robert Gardos; Daniel Habesohn | France; Alexis Lebrun; Félix Lebrun Sweden; Anton Källberg; Jon Persson |
| Women's doubles | Austria; Sofia Polcanova; Romania; Bernadette Szőcs | Romania; Andreea Dragoman; Elizabeta Samara | Luxembourg; Sarah De Nutte; Ni Xialian Romania; Adina Diaconu; Spain; María Xiao |
| Mixed doubles | France; Jia Nan Yuan; Emmanuel Lebesson | Romania; Bernadette Szőcs; Ovidiu Ionescu | Austria; Sofia Polcanova; Robert Gardos Slovakia; Barbora Balážová; Ľubomír Pištej |

== Medal table ==
* Host nation (Germany)

| Rank | Nation | Gold | Silver | Bronze | Total |
|---|---|---|---|---|---|
| 1 | Austria (AUT) | 1.5 | 1 | 1 | 3.5 |
| 2 | Germany (GER)* | 1 | 1 | 2 | 4 |
| 3 | Sweden (SWE) | 1 | 0 | 3 | 4 |
| 4 | France (FRA) | 1 | 0 | 1 | 2 |
| 5 | Romania (ROU) | 0.5 | 2 | 0.5 | 3 |
| 6 | Slovenia (SLO) | 0 | 1 | 0 | 1 |
| 7 | Luxembourg (LUX) | 0 | 0 | 1 | 1 |
| 7 | Slovakia (SVK) | 0 | 0 | 1 | 1 |
| 9 | Spain (ESP) | 0 | 0 | 0.5 | 0.5 |
| Totals (9 entries) | | 5 | 5 | 10 | 20 |

== Participating nations ==
225 players from 39 nations.

- Austria (8)
- Belgium (5)
- Bosnia and Herzegovina (4)
- Bulgaria (5)
- Croatia (7)
- Cyprus (2)
- Czech Republic (9)
- Denmark (4)
- England (5)
- Estonia (4)
- Finland (4)
- France (9)
- Germany (12)
- Greece (7)
- Greenland (1)
- Hungary (9)
- Israel (2)
- Italy (7)
- Kosovo (2)
- Latvia (4)
- Lithuania (5)
- Luxembourg (6)
- Moldova (3)
- Montenegro (2)
- Netherlands (4)
- North Macedonia (2)
- Norway (5)
- Poland (8)
- Portugal (9)
- Romania (11)
- San Marino (2)
- Serbia (8)
- Slovakia (8)
- Slovenia (7)
- Spain (8)
- Sweden (9)
- Switzerland (3)
- Turkey (6)
- Ukraine (8)
