= France at the 2022 European Championships =

in (Germany) Munich 11 August 2022 – 21 August 2022
- Competitors: 245 in 12 sports
- Medals Ranked 4th: Gold 11 Silver 17 Bronze 22 Total 50

European Championships appearances
- 2018; 2022

France will compete at the 2022 European Championships in Munich from August 11 to August 21, 2022.

== Medallists ==
Medal	Name	Sport	Event	Date
Gold	Quentin Lafargue; Benjamin Thomas; Valentin Tabellion; Thomas Denis	Cycling track	Men's team pursuit	12 August
Gold	Benjamin Thomas	Cycling track	Men's points race	12 August
Gold	Léo Bergere	Triathlon	Men's	13 August
Gold	Anthony Jeanjean	Cycling BMX	Men's BMX freestyle	13 August
Gold	Léo Bergere; Emma Lombardi; Dorian Coninx; Cassandre Beaugrand	Triathlon	Mixed relay	14 August
Gold	Sébastien Vigier	Cycling track	Men's sprint	14 August
Gold	Melvin Landerneau	Cycling track	Men's 1 km time trial	15 August
Gold	Donavan Grondin	Cycling track	Men's omnium	15 August
Gold	Yuan Jianan; Emmanuel Lebesson	Table tennis	Mixed doubles	15 August
Gold	Sébastien Vigier	Cycling track	Men's keirin	16 August
Gold	Loana Lecomte	Cycling mountain bike	Women's cross-country	20 August
Silver	Sébastien Vigier; Timmy Gillion; Rayan Helal	Cycling track	Men's team sprint	12 August
Silver	Pierre le Corre	Triathlon	Men's	13 August
Silver	Sam Avezou	Sport climbing	Men's boulder	13 August
Silver	Perle Bouge; Stéphane Tardieu	Rowing	Mixed PR2 double sculls	14 August
Silver	Erika Sauzeau; Margot Boulet; Jérôme Hamelin; Laurent Cadot; Émilie Acquistapace	Rowing	Mixed PR3 coxed four	14 August
Silver	Laura Tarantola; Claire Bové	Rowing	Women's lightweight double sculls	14 August
Silver	Arnaud Démare	Cycling road	Men's individual road race	14 August
Silver	Clara Copponi	Cycling track	Women's omnium	15 August
Silver	Mathilde Gros	Cycling track	Women's sprint	15 August
Silver	Clara Copponi; Marion Borras	Cycling track	Women's madison	16 August
Silver	Thomas Boudat; Donavan Grondin	Cycling track	Men's madison	16 August
Silver	Pascal Martinot-Lagarde	Athletics	Men's 110 metres hurdles	17 August
Silver	Wilfried Happio	Athletics	Men's 400 metres hurdles	19 August
Silver	Pauline Ferrand-Prévot	Cycling mountain bike	Women's cross-country	20 August
Silver	Rénelle Lamote	Athletics	Women's 800 metres	20 August
Silver	Nelia Barbosa	Canoeing	Women's KL3 200 metres	21 August
Silver	Méba-Mickaël Zeze; Pablo Matéo; Ryan Zeze; Jimmy Vicaut	Athletics	Men's 4 × 100 metres relay	21 August
Bronze	Laury Perez	Cycling BMX	Women's BMX freestyle	12 August
Bronze	Victoire Berteau; Valentine Fortin; Clara Copponi; Marion Borras	Cycling track	Women's team pursuit	12 August
Bronze	Emma Lombardi	Triathlon	Women's	12 August
Bronze	Manon Hily	Sport climbing	Women's lead	13 August
Bronze	Dorian Coninx	Triathlon	Men's	13 August
Bronze	Aline Friess	Gymnastics	Women's vault	14 August
Bronze	Lorette Charpy	Gymnastics	Women's uneven bars	14 August
Bronze	Carolann Heduit	Gymnastics	Women's balance beam	14 August
Bronze	Oriane Bertone	Sport climbing	Women's boulder	14 August
Bronze	Victoire Berteau	Cycling track	Women's points race	14 August
Bronze	Rayan Helal	Cycling track	Men's sprint	14 August
Bronze	Guillaume Moro	Sport climbing	Men's speed	15 August
Bronze	Melvin Landerneau	Cycling track	Men's keirin	16 August
Bronze	Jules Pommery	Athletics	Men's long jump	16 August
Bronze	Jean-Marc Pontvianne	Athletics	Men's triple jump	17 August
Bronze	Just Kwaou-Mathey	Athletics	Men's 110 metres hurdles	17 August
Bronze	Alexis Lebrun; Félix Lebrun	Table tennis	Men's doubles	18 August
Bronze	Eddie Potdevin	Canoeing	Men's VL3 200 metres	19 August
Bronze	Guillaume Burger; Maxime Beaumont; Quilian Koch; Guillaume Le Floch	Canoeing	Men's K–4 500 metres	20 August
Bronze	Gilles Biron; Loïc Prevot; Téo Andant; Thomas Jordier	Athletics	Men's 4 × 400 metres relay	20 August
Bronze	Remy Boulle	Canoeing	Men's KL1 200 metres	21 August
Bronze	Yann Schrub	Athletics	Men's 10,000 metres	21 August

== Competitors ==
The following is the list of number of competitors in the Championships:

Sport	Men	Women	Total
Artistic gymnastics (men and women)	5	5	10
Athletics	58	41	99
Beach volleyball	2	4	6
Canoe sprint	13	7	20
Cycling BMX	3	3	6
Cycling mountain bike	4	3	7
Cycling road	10	8	18
Cycling track	10	8	18
Rowing	15	15	30
Sport climbing	7	8	9
Table tennis	4	5	9
Triathlon	4	3	7
Total	135	110	245

== Athletics ==
France entered the following athletes.

Key

- Q = Qualified for the next round
- q = Qualified for the next round as a fastest loser or, in field events, by position without achieving the qualifying target
- NR = National record
- PB = Personal best
- SB = Season best
- N/A = Round not applicable for the event

=== Men ===
Track and road events

Athlete	Event	Heat		Semifinal		Final	
Athlete	Event	Result	Rank	Result	Rank	Result	Rank
Mouhamadou Fall	100 m	Bye		10.16	6 q	10.17	5
Jimmy Vicaut	100 m	Bye		10.18	8	Did not advance	
Méba-Mickaël Zeze	100 m	Bye		10.21	12	Did not advance	
Mouhamadou Fall	200 m	Bye		20.83	19	Did not advance	
Ryan Zeze	200 m	Bye		20.58	14	Did not advance	
Méba-Mickaël Zeze	200 m	Bye		20.47	11	Did not advance	
Thomas Jordier	400 m	45.39 PB	3 Q	45.37 PB	2 Q	45.67	8
Gilles Biron	400 m	45.82	10 Q	45.75	12	Did not advance	
Gabriel Tual	800 m	1:46.08	3 Q	1:47.70	7	Did not advance	
Benjamin Robert	800 m	1:47.66	14 Q	1:48.51	11 Q	1:45.42	5
Yanis Meziane	800 m	1:47.82	20	Did not advance			
Azeddine Habz	1500 m	3:38.47	6 q	—N/a		3:40.92	10
Baptiste Mischler	1500 m	3:39.58	14	—N/a		Did not advance	
Hugo Hay	5000 m	—N/a				13:45.63	19
Felix Bour	5000 m	—N/a				14:05.84	24
Yann Schrub	10,000 m	—N/a				27:47.13 PB	3rd place, bronze medalist(s)
Jimmy Gressier	10,000 m	—N/a				27:49.84	4
Yoann Kowal	10,000 m	—N/a				28:17.39	15
Nicolas Navarro	Marathon	—N/a				2:10:41	5
Michael Gras	Marathon	—N/a				2:12:39	10
Benjamin Choquert	Marathon	—N/a				2:15:48	21
Florian Carvalho	Marathon	—N/a				2:21:51	52
Emmanuel Roudolff	Marathon	—N/a				Did not finish	
Yohan Durand	Marathon	—N/a				Did not finish	
Nicolas Navarro; Michael Gras; Benjamin Choquert; Florian Carvalho; Emmanuel Roudolff |Yohan Durand	Marathon Cup	—N/a				6:39:08	4
Just Kwaou-Mathey	110 m hurdles	Bye		13.30	2 Q	13.30	3rd place, bronze medalist(s)
Pascal Martinot-Lagarde	110 m hurdles	Bye		13.35	4 Q	13.14 =EL	2nd place, silver medalist(s)
Sasha Zhoya	110 m hurdles	Bye		13.46	6 Q	16.51	8
Victor Coroller	400 m hurdles	49.35	1 Q	49.46	9 Q	50.46	8
Ludvy Vaillant	400 m hurdles	Bye		48.52 SB	2 Q	48.79	4
Wilfried Happio	400 m hurdles	Bye		48.89	4 Q	48.56	2nd place, silver medalist(s)
Louis Gilavert	3000 m steeplechase	8:32.26	7 Q	—N/a		8:39.62	15
Djilali Bedrani	3000 m steeplechase	8:35.57	15 q	—N/a		8:28.52	8
Mehdi Belhadj	3000 m steeplechase	8:42.38	22	—N/a		Did not advance	
Kévin Campion	20 km walk	—N/a				1:20:47 PB	6
Gabriel Bordier	20 km walk	—N/a				1:28:11	19
Aurélien Quinionn	35 km walk	—N/a				DSQ	
Méba-Mickaël Zeze; Pablo Matéo; Ryan Zeze; Jimmy Vicaut	4 × 100 m relay	38.17	2 Q	—N/a		37.94 SB	2nd place, silver medalist(s)
Gilles Biron; Loïc Prévot; Téo Andant; Thomas Jordier; Simon Boypa^{[a]}	4 × 400 m relay	3:02.09	6 Q	—N/a		2:59.64 SB	3rd place, bronze medalist(s)

Field events

Athlete	Event	Qualification		Final	
Athlete	Event	Distance	Position	Distance	Position
Sébastien Micheau	High jump	2.21	10 q	NM	
Nathan Ismar	High jump	NM		Did not advance	
Thibaut Collet	Pole vault	5.65	1 q	5.75	5
Renaud Lavillenie	Pole vault	5.65	6 q	5.65	7
Valentin Lavillenie	Pole vault	NM		Did not advance	
Jules Pommery	Long jump	7.83	6 q	8.06	3rd place, bronze medalist(s)
Augustin Bey	Long jump	7.73	13	Did not advance	
Tom Campagne	Long jump	NM		Did not advance	
Jean-Marc Pontvianne	Triple jump	16.96	3 Q	16.94	3rd place, bronze medalist(s)
Enzo Hodebar	Triple jump	16.70	6 q	16.62	7
Benjamin Compaoré	Triple jump	15.17	20	Did not advance	
Quentin Bigot	Hammer throw	77.22	6 q	77.48	7
Jean-Baptiste Bruxelle	Hammer throw	70.79	20	Did not advance	
Yann Chaussinand	Hammer throw	NM		Did not advance	
Felise Vaha'i Sosaia	Javelin throw	74.70	16	Did not advance	

Combined events – Decathlon

Athlete	Event	100 m	LJ	SP	HJ	400 m	110H	DT	PV	JT	1500 m	Final	Rank
Baptiste Thiery	Result	10.87	6.94	12.95 PB	1.90	47.66	15.10	41.93	5.40	55.07 PB	4:18.13 SB	8057 PB	9
Baptiste Thiery	Points	890	799	664	714	926	837	704	1035	664	824	8057 PB	9
Kevin Mayer	Result	11.67	Did not start									Did not finish	
Kevin Mayer	Points	717	Did not start									Did not finish	

=== Women ===
Track and road events

Athlete	Event	Heat		Semifinal		Final	
Athlete	Event	Result	Rank	Result	Rank	Result	Rank
Mallory Leconte	100 m	11.49	12 Q	DQ		Did not advance	
Shana Grebo	200 m	23.00	2 Q	23.13	9 Q	23.06	6
Gémima Joseph	200 m	23.21	10 Q	23.36	13	Did not advance	
Amandine Brossier	400 m	51.26 SB	2 Q	51.21 PB	9	Did not advance	
Sokhna Lacoste	400 m	52.62	14	Did not advance			
Rénelle Lamote	800 m	2:02.22	7 Q	2:00.23	1 Q	1:59.49	2nd place, silver medalist(s)
Agnès Raharolahy	800 m	2:07.02	29	Did not advance			
Aurore Fleury	1500 m	4:07.82	23	—N/a		Did not advance	
Manon Trapp	5000 m	—N/a				16:15.44	19
Alessia Zarbo	10,000 m	—N/a				32:36.28	12
Mekdes Woldu	10,000 m	—N/a				32:39.54	13
Melody Julien	Marathon	—N/a				2:32:19	14
Laura Valette	100 m hurdles	13.30	8 Q	13.20	18	Did not advance	
Cyréna Samba-Mayela	100 m hurdles	Bye		12.82	7 Q	13.05	7
Laëticia Bapté	100 m hurdles	Bye		13.16	15	Did not advance	
Camille Seri	400 m hurdles	56.18 PB	4 Q	Did not finish		Did not advance	
Flavie Renouard	3000 m steeplechase	9:51.49	17	—N/a		Did not advance	
Alexa Lemitre	3000 m steeplechase	9:58.49	21	—N/a		Did not advance	
Clémence Beretta	20 km walk	—N/a				1:30:37 NR	6
Camille Moutard	20 km walk	—N/a				1:34:04	11
Eloise Terrec	20 km walk	—N/a				1:33:16	10
Floriane Gnafoua; Gémima Joseph; Helene Parisot; Mallory Leconte	4 × 100 m relay	43.24 SB	3 Q	—N/a		Did not finish	
Sokhna Lacoste; Marjorie Veyssiere; Diana Iscaye; Amandine Brossier	4 × 400 m relay	3:29.64	11	—N/a		Did not advance	

Field events

Athlete	Event	Qualification		Final	
Athlete	Event	Distance	Position	Distance	Position
Solène Gicquel	High jump	1.87	12 q	1.86	13
Marie-Julie Bonnin	Pole vault	4.40	10 q	4.55 PB	6
Margot Chevrier	Pole vault	4.40	10 q	4.40	10
Ninon Chapelle	Pole vault	4.40	14	Did not advance	
Yanis David	Long jump	6.57	9 q	6.51	8
Maelly Dalmat	Long jump	NM		Did not advance	
Mélina Robert-Michon	Discus throw	58.85	9 q	60.60	8
Amanda Ngandu-Ntumba	Discus throw	54.70	22	Did not advance	
Alexandra Tavernier	Hammer throw	68.99	4 q	66.60	12
Rose Loga	Hammer throw	66.27	20	Did not advance	
Alizée Minard	Javelin throw	52.50	22	Did not advance	

Combined events – Heptathlon

Athlete	Event	100H	HJ	SP	200 m	LJ	JT	800 m	Final	Rank
Léonie Cambours	Result	13.52	1.77	11.95	24.73	NM	36.35	2:22.20	4949	14
Léonie Cambours	Points	1047	941	658	912	0	597	794	4949	14

^{a} Athletes who participated in the heats only.

== Beach Volleyball ==
France has qualified 1 male and 2 female pairs.

Athlete	Event	Preliminary round			Round of 24	Round of 16	Quarterfinals	Semifinals	Final / BM	
Athlete	Event	Opposition Score	Opposition Score	Rank	Opposition Score	Opposition Score	Opposition Score	Opposition Score	Opposition Score	Rank
Youssef Krou; Quincy Aye	Men's	Ermacora – Pristauz (AUT); W 2–0 (21–19, 21–18)	Perušič – Schweiner (CZE); L 1–2 (21–19, 14–21, 10–15)	2 Q	Samoilovs – Šmēdiņš (LAT); L 0–2 (18–21, 18–21)	Did not advance				17
Lezana Placette; Alexia Richard	Women's	Lahti-Liukkonen – Parkkinen (FIN); L 1–2 (19–21, 21–16, 17–19)	Windeleff – Nørager Bisgaard (DEN); L 1–2 (15–21, 17–21)	4	Did not advance					25
Clémence Vieira; Aline Chamereau	Women's	Müller – Tillmann (GER); L 0–2 (14–21, 15–21)	Ahtiainen – Prihti (FIN); L 1–2 (18–21, 15–21)	4	Did not advance					25

== Canoeing ==
Men

Athlete	Event	Heats		Semifinals		Final	
Athlete	Event	Time	Rank	Time	Rank	Time	Rank
Frantz Vasseur	C-1 500 m	2:03.598	5 SF	1:51.979	3 FA	2:01.527	8
Adrien Bart	C-1 1000 m	3:56.808	3 F	Bye		3:55.347	5
Adrien Bart; Loïc Leonard	C-2 500 m	1:45.797	3 F	Bye		1:47.800	7
Cyrille Carré	K-1 500 m	1:45.352	4 SF	1:45.210	4 FB	1:41.505	14
Cyrille Carré	K-1 1000 m	3:42.988	8	Did not advance			23
Cyrille Carré	K-1 5000 m	—N/a				DNF	
Edgar Grigoryan; Francis Mouget	K-2 500 m	1:34.818	3 SF	1:32.262	5 FB	1:33.682	15
Maxime Beaumont; Guillaume Burger; Quilian Koch; Guillaume Le Floch	K-4 500 m	1:21.111	3 F	Bye		1:20.902	3rd place, bronze medalist(s)
Rémy Boullé	KL1 200 m	—N/a				48.066	3rd place, bronze medalist(s)
Abel Aber	VL3 200 m	52.038	2 F	Bye		50.515	6
Eddie Potdevin	VL3 200 m	50.294	2 F	Bye		49.104	3rd place, bronze medalist(s)

Women

Athlete	Event	Heats		Semifinals		Final	
Athlete	Event	Time	Rank	Time	Rank	Time	Rank
Eugénie Dorange	C-1 200 m	49.033	5 SF	48.554	2 F	50.726	7
Eugénie Dorange; Axelle Renard	C-2 500 m	—N/a				2:01.778	5
Vanina Paoletti	K-1 500 m	1:57.401	3 SF	1:55.754	5 FB	1:56.012	10
Manon Hostens; Léa Jamelot	K-2 500 m	1:52.471	4 SF	1:44.429	2 FA	1:44.867	6
Margaux Briswalter; Manon Hostens; Léa Jamelot; Vanina Paoletti	K-4 500 m	1:36.251	2 F	Bye		1:39.174	7
Nélia Barbosa	KL3 200 m	—N/a				47.784	2nd place, silver medalist(s)

== Cycling ==
=== Road ===
Men

Athlete	Event	Time	Rank
Rudy Barbier	Road race	4:41:43	100
Thomas Boudat	Road race	4:39:43	82
Bryan Coquard	Road race	4:41:28	97
Arnaud Démare	Road race	4:38:49	2nd place, silver medalist(s)
Dorian Godon	Road race	4:41:43	101
Hugo Hofstetter	Road race	4:38:57	30
Jérémy Lecroq	Road race	4:41:28	98
Anthony Roux	Time trial	29:11.42	21
Clément Russo	Road race	4:39:28	69
Kévin Vauquelin	Time trial	28:17.61	7

Women

Athlete	Event	Time	Rank
Victoire Berteau	Road race	2:59:51	56
Audrey Cordon-Ragot	Road race	2:59:51	54
Audrey Cordon-Ragot	Time trial	31:53.31	4
Coralie Demay	Road race	3:00:48	61
Eugénie Duval	Road race	2:59:30	33
Valentine Fortin	Road race	3:02:32	84
Juliette Labous	Road race	2:59:51	54
Juliette Labous	Time trial	32:01.10	6
Gladys Verhulst	Road race	2:59:20	9
Margaux Vigié	Road race	2:59:30	37

=== Track ===
Elimination race

Athlete	Event	Final
Athlete	Event	Rank
Valentin Tabellion	Men's elimination race	8
Valentine Fortin	Women's elimination race	4

Keirin

Athlete	Event	1st Round	Repechage	2nd Round	Final
Athlete	Event	Rank	Rank	Rank	Rank
Melvin Landerneau	Men's keirin	2 R	1 SF	3 F1-6	3rd place, bronze medalist(s)
Sébastien Vigier	Men's keirin	1 SF	Bye	3 F1-6	1st place, gold medalist(s)
Mathilde Gros	Women's keirin	3 R	1 SF	2 F1-6	5
Taky Marie-Divine Kouamé	Women's keirin	5 R	2 SF	5 F7–12	11

Madison

Athlete	Event	Final	
Athlete	Event	Points	Rank
Thomas Boudat; Donavan Grondin	Men's madison	91	2nd place, silver medalist(s)
Marion Borras; Clara Copponi	Women's madison	40	2nd place, silver medalist(s)

Omnium

Athlete	Event	Qualification		Scratch Race		Tempo Race		Elimination Race		Points Race		Total points	Rank
Athlete	Event	Rank	Points	Rank	Points	Rank	Points	Rank	Points	Rank	Points	Total points	Rank
Donovan Grondin	Men's omnium	4 Q	6	6	30	9	24	1	40	1	56	150	1st place, gold medalist(s)
Clara Copponi	Women's omnium	—N/a		4	34	1	40	1	40	2	57	171	2nd place, silver medalist(s)

Points race

Athlete	Event	Final	
Athlete	Event	Points	Rank
Benjamin Thomas	Men's points race	135	1st place, gold medalist(s)
Victoire Berteau	Women's points race	47	3rd place, bronze medalist(s)

Pursuit

Athlete	Event	Qualification		Semifinals		Final	
Athlete	Event	Time	Rank	Opponent Results	Rank	Opponent Results	Rank
Thomas Denis	Men's individual pursuit	4:26.776	17	—N/a		did not advance	
Valentin Tabellion	Men's individual pursuit	4:22.389	13	—N/a		Did not advance	
Marion Borras	Women's individual pursuit	3:27.579	7	—N/a		Did not advance	
Jade Labastugue	Women's individual pursuit	3:31.649	10	—N/a		Did not advance	
Thomas Denis; Quentin Lafargue; Benjamin Thomas; Valentin Tabellion	Men's team pursuit	3:54.125	1 Q	Great Britain; W 3:52.110	1 QG	Denmark; W 3:50.507	1st place, gold medalist(s)
Victoire Berteau; Valentine Fortin; Clara Copponi; Marion Borras	Women's team pursuit	4:18.074	3 Q	Italy; L 4:14.489	3 QB	Great Britain; W OVL	3rd place, bronze medalist(s)

Scratch

Athlete	Event	Final	
Athlete	Event	Laps down	Rank
Donavan Grondin	Men's scratch	-2	6
Jade Labastugue	Women's scratch	0	16

Sprint

Athlete	Event	Qualification		Round 1	Round 2	Quarterfinals	Semifinals	Final	
Athlete	Event	Time Speed (km/h)	Rank	Opposition Time Speed (km/h)	Opposition Time Speed (km/h)	Opposition Time Speed (km/h)	Opposition Time Speed (km/h)	Opposition Time Speed (km/h)	Rank
Rayan Helal	Men's sprint	9.675; 74.418	4	Bye	Bohuslávek (CZE); W 10.409; 69.170	van Loon (NED); W 10.218, W 10.766	Carlin (GBR); L, L	Turnbull (GBR); W 10.920, W 10.265	3rd place, bronze medalist(s)
Sébastien Vigier	Men's sprint	9.641; 74.681	3	Bye	Martínez Chorro (ESP); W 10.318; 69.780	Dörnbach (GER); L, W 10.544, W 10.472	Turnbull (GBR); L, W 10.315, W 10.577	Carlin (GBR); L, W 10.206, W 10.513	1st place, gold medalist(s)
Mathilde Gros	Women's sprint	10.326; 69.726	1	Bye	Sibiak (POL); W 11.536; 62.413	Kouamé (FRA); W 11.210, W 11.165	Friedrich (GER); W 11.245, W 10.899	Hinze (GER); L, W 10.969, L	2nd place, silver medalist(s)
Taky Marie-Divine Kouamé	Women's sprint	10.753; 66.958	9	Bye	Łoś (POL); W 11.516; 62.521	Gros (FRA); L, L	Did not advance		7

Team sprint

Athlete	Event	Qualification		Semifinals		Final	
Athlete	Event	Time	Rank	Opponent Results	Rank	Opponent Results	Rank
Melvin Landerneau; Sébastien Vigier; Timmy Gillion; Rayan Helal	Men's team sprint	35.751	3 Q	Czech Republic; W 35.194	2 QG	Netherlands; L 35.516	2nd place, silver medalist(s)
Taky Marie-Divine Kouamé; Mathilde Gros; Julie Michaux	Women's team sprint	38.926	3	No opponent 39.150	3 QB	Poland; L 39.341	4

Time trial

Athlete	Event	Qualifying		Final	
Athlete	Event	Time	Rank	Time	Rank
Quentin Lafargue	Men's 1 km time trial	1:00.550	5 Q	1:01.030	7
Melvin Landerneau	Men's 1 km time trial	59.653	1 Q	59.975	1st place, gold medalist(s)
Taky Marie-Divine Kouamé	Women's 500 m time trial	33.802	7 Q	DNF	
Julie Michaux	Women's 500 m time trial	34.854	13	Did not advance	

=== Mountain bike ===
Athlete	Event	Time	Rank
Joshua Dubau	Men's cross-country	1:19:33	14
Thomas Griot	Men's cross-country	DNF	
Victor Koretzky	Men's cross-country	1:18:27	4
Stéphane Tempier	Men's cross-country	1:19:38	15
Pauline Ferrand Prevot	Women's cross-country	1:28:41	2nd place, silver medalist(s)
Léna Gerault	Women's cross-country	1:34:35	13
Loana Lecomte	Women's cross-country	1:28:04	1st place, gold medalist(s)

=== BMX freestyle ===
Athlete	Event	Qualification		Final	
Athlete	Event	Points	Rank	Points	Rank
Istvan Caillet	Men's	72.95	6 Q	67.00	11
Kevin Fabregue	Men's	77.85	5 Q	60.20	12
Anthony Jeanjean	Men's	88.10	1 Q	93.60	1st place, gold medalist(s)
Lisa-Marie Blanc	Women's	26.20	10	Did not advance	
Laury Perez	Women's	63.70	4 Q	78.20	3rd place, bronze medalist(s)

== Gymnastics ==
France has entered 5 men and 5 women.

=== Men ===
Qualification

Athlete	Event	Qualification								Final							
Athlete	Event	Apparatus						Total	Rank	Apparatus						Total	Rank
Athlete	Event	F	PH	R	V	PB	HB	Total	Rank	F	PH	R	V	PB	HB	Total	Rank
Cameron-Lie Bernard	Team	—N/a	13.000	12.800	—N/a	14.266	12.366	—N/a		—N/a		13.233	—N/a	14.733	—N/a	—N/a	
Paul Degouy	Team	13.733	—N/a	13.200	14.400	14.066	13.833 Q	—N/a		13.600	—N/a	12.866	14.333	13.766	13.333	—N/a	
Benjamin Osberger	Team	13.866	14.366 Q	13.100	14.000	—N/a				14.166	13.166	—N/a	13.266	—N/a		—N/a	
Léo Saladino	Team	13.366	13.066	13.700	14.600 Q	13.866	13.033	81.631	13	13.500	13.166	13.433	14.300	14.033	12.466	—N/a	
Julien Saleur	Team	13.100	13.500	—N/a	14.066	13.733	12.866	—N/a		—N/a	13.466	—N/a			12.966	—N/a	
Total	Team	40.965	40.932	40.000	43.066	42.198	39.732	246.893	5 Q	41.266	39.798	39.532	41.899	42.532	38.765	243.792	5

Individual finals

Athlete	Event	Apparatus						Total	Rank
Athlete	Event	F	PH	R	V	PB	HB	Total	Rank
Paul Degouy	Horizontal bar	—N/a					13.166	13.166	6
Benjamin Osberger	Pommel horse	—N/a	14.566	—N/a				14.566	4
Léo Saldino	Vault	—N/a			13.699	—N/a		13.699	8

=== Women ===
Qualification

Athlete	Event	Qualification						Final					
Athlete	Event	Apparatus				Total	Rank	Apparatus				Total	Rank
Athlete	Event	V	UB	BB	F	Total	Rank	V	UB	BB	F	Total	Rank
Marine Boyer	Team	13.200	—N/a	13.000	12.366	—N/a		—N/a		12.866	12.700	—N/a	
Lorette Charpy	Team	—N/a	13.833	—N/a				—N/a	13.266	—N/a		—N/a	
Aline Friess	Team	14.333	12.500	12.166	12.800	51.799	15	14.233	13.266	—N/a		—N/a	
Carolann Héduit	Team	13.800	13.733	13.400	12.766	53.699	4	13.800	13.800	11.300	12.966	—N/a	
Morgane Osyssek-Reimer	Team	13.300	10.433	12.466	13.200	49.399	25	12.033	—N/a	11.766	13.166	—N/a	
Total	Team	41.433	40.066	38.866	38.766	159.131	3 Q	40.066	40.332	35.932	38.832	155.162	6

Individual finals

Athlete	Event	Apparatus				Total	Rank
Athlete	Event	V	UB	BB	F	Total	Rank
Lorette Charpy	Uneven bars	—N/a	14.166	—N/a		14.166	3rd place, bronze medalist(s)
Aline Friess	Vault	13.599	—N/a			13.599	3rd place, bronze medalist(s)
Carolann Héduit	Balance beam	—N/a		13.400	—N/a	13.400	3rd place, bronze medalist(s)
Morgane Osyssek-Reimer	Floor exercise	—N/a			12.666	12.666	7

== Rowing ==
Men

Athlete	Event	Heats		Repechage		Semifinals		Final	
Athlete	Event	Time	Rank	Time	Rank	Time	Rank	Time	Rank
Victor Marcelot; Benoît Bruner; Valentin Onfroy; Théophile Onfroy	Quadruple sculls	6:24.33	3 SA/B	Bye		6:22.12	2 FA	6:16.27	6
Étienne Juillet; Esteban Catoul	Coxless pair	7:24.63	4 R	7:24.24	4 FC	—N/a		7:19.36	15

Women

Athlete	Event	Heats		Repechage		Semifinals		Final	
Athlete	Event	Time	Rank	Time	Rank	Time	Rank	Time	Rank
Marie Jacquet; Violaine Aernoudts; Margaux Bailleul; Emma Lunatti	Quadruple sculls	7:24.26	4 R	6:57.75	5 FB	—N/a		6:42.37	7
Maya Cornut; Adele Brosse; Julie Voirin; Emma Cornelis	Coxless four	7:27.42	4 R	7:07.80	4 FB	—N/a		6:55.45	7
Aurélie Morizot	Lightweight single sculls	8:43.48	3 R	8:31.98	3 FB	—N/a		8:29.50	8
Laura Tarantola; Claire Bové	Lightweight double sculls	7:51.38	2 R	7:29.05	1 FA	—N/a		7:33.33	2nd place, silver medalist(s)

Mixed

Athlete	Event	Heats		Final	
Athlete	Event	Time	Rank	Time	Rank
Stéphane Tardieu; Perle Bouge	PR2 double sculls	9:20.36	2	8:57.95	2nd place, silver medalist(s)
Érika Sauzeau; Margot Boulet; Jérôme Hamelin; Laurent Cadot; Émilie Acquistapace	PR3 coxed four	7:51.77	2	7:26.06	2nd place, silver medalist(s)

== Sport climbing ==
Boulder

Athlete	Event	Qualification		Semifinal		Final	
Athlete	Event	Result	Rank	Result	Rank	Result	Rank
Sam Avezou	Men's boulder	2T5z 4 11	19 Q	1T3z 6 7	2 Q	2T2z 7 4	2nd place, silver medalist(s)
Manuel Cornu	Men's boulder	4T4z 5 5	1 Q	0T3z 0 8	9	Did not advance	
Paul Jenft	Men's boulder	3T4z 9 7	11 Q	1T2z 6 7	7	Did not advance	
Mickaël Mawem	Men's boulder	4T4z 7 7	3 Q	0T2z 0 7	17	Did not advance	
Mejdi Schalck	Men's boulder	3T4z 6 10	7 Q	1T2z 3 4	5 Q	1T3z 3 6	4
Oriane Bertone	Women's boulder	4T5z 10 10	3 Q	2T3z 2 3	6 Q	2T3z 7 7	3rd place, bronze medalist(s)
Agathe Calliet	Women's boulder	1T2z 1 2	23	Did not advance			
Flavy Cohaut	Women's boulder	1T4z 5 12	17 Q	1T3z 2 8	13	Did not advance	
Fanny Gibert	Women's boulder	3T4z 10 12	7 Q	2T4z 3 10	6 Q	0T3z 0 6	6

Combined

Athlete	Event	Qualification		Final						
Athlete	Event	Total	Rank	Boulder		Lead			Total	Rank
Athlete	Event	Total	Rank	Points	Place	Hold	Points	Place	Total	Rank
Sam Avezou	Men's	925.00	7 Q	80.6	2	38+	40.1	6	120.7	6
Paul Jenft	Men's	640.00	11	Did not advance						
Mickaël Mawem	Men's	242.00	20	Did not advance						
Mejdi Schalck	Men's	850.00	8 Q	80.5	3	30+	15.1	7	95.6	7

Lead

Athlete	Event	Qualification								Semifinal			Final		
Athlete	Event	Hold	Time	Rank	Hold	Time	Rank	Points	Rank	Hold	Time	Rank	Hold	Time	Rank
Sam Avezou	Men's lead	37	3:04	17	39+	3:01	23	20.62	20 Q	21+	2:04	23	Did not advance		
Paul Jenft	Men's lead	29+	3:16	25	43	5:42	12	17.66	15 Q	34	4:21	18	Did not advance		
Mickaël Mawem	Men's lead	34	2:36	21	30	3:43	39	28.96	32	Did not advance					
Mejdi Schalck	Men's lead	36+	2:57	18	Top	5:42	1	8.05	9 Q	34+	3:51	15	Did not advance		
Manon Hily	Women's lead	46+	5:39	8	42+	2:18	4	5.66	4 Q	35	4:14	2 Q	41+	4:54	3rd place, bronze medalist(s)
Hélène Janicot	Women's lead	47+	5:15	6	39	4:39	6	6.00	5 Q	24	2:33	11	Did not advance		

Speed

Athlete	Event	Qualification		Round of 16	Quarterfinal	Semifinal	Final	
Athlete	Event	Time	Rank	Opposition Time	Opposition Time	Opposition Time	Opposition Time	Rank
Bassa Mawem	Men's	5.735	4 Q	Carmanns (GER); W 6.106	Dzieński (POL); L 5.672	Did not advance		
Guillaume Moro	Men's	5.801	6 Q	Zurloni (ITA); W 5.731	Cingari (ITA); W 5.722	Boldyrev (UKR); L 9.099	Noya Cardona (ESP); W 5.551	3rd place, bronze medalist(s)
Aurélia Sarisson	Women's	8.194	9 Q	Bellesini (ITA); W 7.740	Mirosław (POL); L 7.894	Did not advance		
Capucine Viglione	Women's	7.929	7 Q	Brockfeld (GER); L 10.861	Did not advance			

== Table tennis ==
=== Men ===
Athlete	Event	Qualification stage				Preliminary Round 1	Preliminary Round 2	Round of 64	Round of 32	Round of 16	Quarterfinals	Semifinals	Final / BM	
Athlete	Event	Opposition Score	Opposition Score	Opposition Score	Rank	Opposition Score	Opposition Score	Opposition Score	Opposition Score	Opposition Score	Opposition Score	Opposition Score	Opposition Score	Rank
Simon Gauzy	Singles	Bye						Rassenfosse (BEL); L 3–4	Did not advance					
Emmanuel Lebesson	Singles	Bye						András (HUN); L 3–4	Did not advance					
Alexis Lebrun	Singles	Bye						Allegro (BEL); W 4–1	Nuytinck (BEL); W 4–0	Karlsson (SWE); L 2–4	Did not advance			
Félix Lebrun	Singles	Bye						Lambiet (BEL); W 4–1	Karlsson (SWE); L 1–4	Did not advance				
Emmanuel Lebesson; Simon Gauzy	Doubles	—N/a				Bye	Radović / Radulović (MNE); W 3–0	—N/a	Källberg / Persson (SWE); L 2–3	Did not advance				
Alexis Lebrun; Félix Lebrun	Doubles	—N/a				Bye		—N/a	Israeli (ISR) / Piccolin (ITA); W 3–0	Levajac (SRB) / Putuntica (MDA); W 3–0	Redzimski (POL) / Ursu (MDA); W 3–1	Habesohn / Gardos (AUT); L 1–3	Did not advance	3rd place, bronze medalist(s)

=== Women ===
Athlete	Event	Qualification stage				Preliminary Round 1	Preliminary Round 2	Round of 64	Round of 32	Round of 16	Quarterfinals	Semifinals	Final / BM	
Athlete	Event	Opposition Score	Opposition Score	Opposition Score	Rank	Opposition Score	Opposition Score	Opposition Score	Opposition Score	Opposition Score	Opposition Score	Opposition Score	Opposition Score	Rank
Océane Guisnel	Singles	Zhang (ESP); W 3–1	Riliškytė (LTU); W 3–1	—N/a	1 Q	Bye		Winter (GER); L 0–4	Did not advance					
Camille Lutz	Singles	Bye						Arapović (CRO); L 0–4	Did not advance					
Charlotte Lutz	Singles	Jankauskienė (LTU); W 3–2	Bilenko (UKR); L 2–3	—N/a	2 Q	Pinto (POR); W 3–1	Stražar (SLO); W 3–1	Mittelham (GER); L 1–4	Did not advance					
Prithika Pavade	Singles	Bye						Malobabić (CRO); W 4–1	Ni (LUX); L 3–4	Did not advance				
Yuan Jianan	Singles	Bye						Toliou (GRE); W 4–3	Bajor (POL); W 4–1	Pesotska (UKR); W 4–3	Mittelham (GER); L 3–4	Did not advance		
Océane Guisnel; Charlotte Lutz	Doubles	—N/a				Bye	Toftaker / Carlsen (NOR); W 3–2	—N/a	Dragoman / Samara (ROU); L 0–3	Did not advance				
Prithika Pavade; Camille Lutz	Doubles	—N/a				Bye	Munne / Rodríguez (ESP); L w/o	—N/a	Did not advance					

=== Mixed ===
Athlete	Event	Preliminary Round 1	Preliminary Round 2	Round of 32	Round of 16	Quarterfinals	Semifinals	Final / BM	
Athlete	Event	Opposition Score	Opposition Score	Opposition Score	Opposition Score	Opposition Score	Opposition Score	Opposition Score	Rank
Simon Gauzy; Prithika Pavade	Doubles	Bye		Željko / Jeger (CRO); W 3–0	Wang / Kukuľková (SVK); W 3–0	Gardos / Polcanova (AUT); L 1–3	Did not advance		
Emmanuel Lebesson; Yuan Jianan	Doubles	Bye		Konstantinopoulos / Terpou (GRE); W 3–0	Habesohn (AUT) / Samara (ROU); W 3–0	Ecseki / Madarász (HUN); W 3–2	Pištej / Balážová (SVK); W 3–0	Ionescu / Szőcs (ROU); W 3–1	1st place, gold medalist(s)

== Triathlon ==
=== Men ===
Athlete	Event	Swim (1.5 km)	Trans 1	Bike (40 km)	Trans 2	Run (10 km)	Total Time	Rank
Léo Bergère	Men's	17:49	0:33	51:13	0:22	31:12	1:41:09	1st place, gold medalist(s)
Dorian Coninx	Men's	17:39	0:34	51:21	0:22	31:28	1:41:24	3rd place, bronze medalist(s)
Pierre Le Corre	Men's	17:45	0:32	51:17	0:23	31:20	1:41:17	2nd place, silver medalist(s)
Tom Richard	Men's	18:18	0:35	51:29	0:25	34:30	1:45:17	32

=== Women ===
Athlete	Event	Swim (1.5 km)	Trans 1	Bike (40 km)	Trans 2	Run (10 km)	Total Time	Rank
Cassandre Beaugrand	Women's	19:25	0:36	57:19	0:25	35:20	1:53:05	5
Emma Lombardi	Women's	19:42	0:32	57:05	0:24	34:39	1:52:22	3rd place, bronze medalist(s)
Leonie Periault	Women's	19:41	0:38	57:07	0:28	40:30	1:58:24	28

=== Mixed ===
Athlete	Event	Swim (300 m)	Trans 1	Bike (6.8 km)	Trans 2	Run (2 km)	Total Group Time	Rank
Léo Bergere; Emma Lombardi; Dorian Coninx; Cassandre Beaugrand	Mixed relay	15:34	2:59	45:46	1:35	19:27	1:25:30	1st place, gold medalist(s)
