= Germany at the 2022 European Championships =

in (Germany) Munich 11 August 2022 – 22 August 2022
- Competitors: 342 in 12 sports
- Medals Ranked 1st: Gold 26 Silver 20 Bronze 14 Total 60

European Championships appearances
- 2018; 2022

Germany is the host nation of the 2022 European Championships in Munich. It competed with 336 athletes across all 9 sports in the Championships. The team finished with 60 medals, amongst them 26 gold medals, which ranked them 1st at the conclusion of the Championships.

== Medallists ==
Medal	Name	Sport	Event	Date
Gold	Lisa Brennauer; Franziska Brauße; Mieke Kröger; Lisa Klein	Cycling	Women's team pursuit	12 August
Gold	Emma Hinze; Pauline Grabosch; Lea Sophie Friedrich	Cycling	Women's team sprint	12 August
Gold	Emma Hinze	Cycling	Women's 500 m time trial	13 August
Gold	Mieke Kröger	Cycling	Women's individual pursuit	13 August
Gold	Nicolas Heinrich	Cycling	Men's individual pursuit	13 August
Gold	Elisabeth Seitz	Gymnastics	Women's uneven bars	14 August
Gold	Emma Malewski	Gymnastics	Women's balance beam	14 August
Gold	Miriam Dattke; Kristina Hendel; Domenika Mayer; Deborah Schöneborn; Rabea Schöneborn; Katharina Steinruck	Athletics	Women's marathon team	15 August
Gold	Richard Ringer	Athletics	Men's marathon	15 August
Gold	Emma Hinze	Cycling	Women's sprint	15 August
Gold	Lea Sophie Friedrich	Cycling	Women's keirin	16 August
Gold	Roger Kluge; Theo Reinhardt	Cycling	Men's madison	16 August
Gold	Niklas Kaul	Athletics	Men's decathlon	16 August
Gold	Gina Lückenkemper	Athletics	Women's 100 metres	16 August
Gold	Konstanze Klosterhalfen	Athletics	Women's 5000 metres	18 August
Gold	Tobias Schultz; Tom Liebscher; Martin Hiller; Felix Frank	Canoeing	Men's K–4 1000 metres	19 August
Gold	Sebastian Brendel; Tim Hecker	Canoeing	Men's C–2 1000 metres	19 August
Gold	Jacob Schopf	Canoeing	Men's K–1 500 metres	19 August
Gold	Lillemor Köper	Canoeing	Women's VL1 200 metres	19 August
Gold	Max Rendschmidt; Tom Liebscher; Jacob Schopf; Max Lemke	Canoeing	Men's K–4 500 metres	20 August
Gold	Sebastian Brendel	Canoeing	Men's C–1 5000 metres	20 August
Gold	Edina Müller	Canoeing	Women's KL1 200 metres	21 August
Gold	Martin Hiller; Tamás Grossmann	Canoeing	Men's K–2 1000 metres	21 August
Gold	Dang Qiu	Table tennis	Men's singles	21 August
Gold	Julian Weber	Athletics	Men's javelin throw	21 August
Gold	Alexandra Burghardt; Rebekka Haase; Gina Lückenkemper; Lisa Mayer; Jessica-Bianca Wessolly (heats only)	Athletics	Women's 4 × 100 metres relay	21 August
Silver	Kim Lea Müller	Cycling	Women's BMX freestyle	12 August
Silver	Laura Lindemann	Triathlon	Women's	12 August
Silver	Manuela Diening	Rowing	Women's PR1 single sculls	13 August
Silver	Lisa Brennauer	Cycling	Women's individual pursuit	13 August
Silver	Moritz Malcharek	Cycling	Men's scratch	13 August
Silver	Hannah Meul	Sport climbing	Women's boulder	14 August
Silver	Valentin Wernz; Nina Eim; Simon Henseleit; Laura Lindemann	Triathlon	Mixed relay	14 August
Silver	Theo Reinhardt	Cycling	Men's elimination race	14 August
Silver	Simon Boch; Johannes Motschmann; Amanal Petros; Hendrik Pfeiffer; Richard Ringer; Konstantin Wedel	Athletics	Men's marathon team	15 August
Silver	Christopher Linke	Athletics	Men's 35 kilometres walk	16 August
Silver	Maximilian Dörnbach	Cycling	Men's keirin	16 August
Silver	Kristin Pudenz	Athletics	Women's discus throw	16 August
Silver	Tobias Potye	Athletics	Men's high jump	18 August
Silver	Malaika Mihambo	Athletics	Women's long jump	18 August
Silver	Esther Bode	Canoeing	Women's VL1 200 metres	19 August
Silver	Bo Kanda Lita Baehre	Athletics	Men's pole vault	20 August
Silver	Lea Meyer	Athletics	Women's 3000 metres steeplechase	20 August
Silver	Felix Frank; Moritz Florstedt	Canoeing	Men's K–2 500 metres	21 August
Silver	Nina Mittelham	Table tennis	Women's singles	21 August
Silver	Annika Loske	Canoeing	Women's C–1 5000 metres	21 August
Bronze	Kim Bui; Emma Malewski; Pauline Schäfer-Betz; Elisabeth Seitz; Sarah Voss	Gymnastics	Women's team all-around	13 August
Bronze	Jan Helmich; Susanne Lackner; Katharina Marchand; Marc Lembeck; Inga Thöne	Rowing	Mixed PR3 coxed four	14 August
Bronze	Alexandra Föster	Rowing	Women's single sculls	14 August
Bronze	Maximilian Dörnbach	Cycling	Men's 1 km time trial	15 August
Bronze	Claudine Vita	Athletics	Women's discus throw	16 August
Bronze	Katharina Bauernschmidt	Canoeing	Women's VL2 200 metres	19 August
Bronze	Saskia Feige	Athletics	Women's 20 kilometres walk	20 August
Bronze	Paulina Paszek; Jule Hake	Canoeing	Women's K–2 500 metres	20 August
Bronze	Sabine Winter	Table tennis	Women's singles	20 August
Bronze	Shan Xiaona	Table tennis	Women's singles	20 August
Bronze	Lisa Jahn; Sophie Koch	Canoeing	Women's C–2 200 metres	21 August
Bronze	Paulina Paszek; Jule Hake	Canoeing	Women's K–2 200 metres	21 August
Bronze	Sebastian Brendel; Tim Hecker	Canoeing	Men's C–2 500 metres	21 August
Bronze	Nils Dunkel	Gymnastics	Men's pommel horse	21 August

Medals by sport
Sport	1st place, gold medalist(s)	2nd place, silver medalist(s)	3rd place, bronze medalist(s)	Total
Cycling	8	5	1	14
Canoeing	8	3	5	16
Athletics	7	7	2	16
Gymnastics	2	0	2	4
Table tennis	1	1	2	4
Triathlon	0	2	0	2
Rowing	0	1	2	3
Sport climbing	0	1	0	1
Total	26	20	14	60

Medals by gender
Gender	1st place, gold medalist(s)	2nd place, silver medalist(s)	3rd place, bronze medalist(s)	Total
Female	14	11	10	35
Male	12	8	3	23
Mixed	0	1	1	2
Total	26	20	14	60

Multiple medalists
Name	Sport	1st place, gold medalist(s)	2nd place, silver medalist(s)	3rd place, bronze medalist(s)	Total
Emma Hinze	Cycling	3	0	0	3
Sebastian Brendel	Canoeing	2	0	1	3
Gina Lückenkemper	Athletics	2	0	0	2
Martin Hiller	Canoeing	2	0	0	2
Tom Liebscher	Canoeing	2	0	0	2
Jacob Schopf	Canoeing	2	0	0	2
Lea Sophie Friedrich	Cycling	2	0	0	2
Mieke Kröger	Cycling	2	0	0	2
Richard Ringer	Athletics	1	1	0	2
Felix Frank	Canoeing	1	1	0	2
Lisa Brennauer	Cycling	1	1	0	2
Theo Reinhardt	Cycling	1	1	0	2
Tim Hecker	Canoeing	1	0	1	2
Emma Malewski	Gymnastics	1	0	1	2
Elisabeth Seitz	Gymnastics	1	0	1	2
Laura Lindemann	Triathlon	0	2	0	2
Maximilian Dörnbach	Cycling	0	1	1	2
Jule Hake	Canoeing	0	0	2	2
Paulina Paszek	Canoeing	0	0	2	2

== Competitors ==
The following is the list of number of competitors in the Championships:

Sport	Men	Women	Total
Athletics	60	59	119
Beach Volleyball	8	10	18
Canoeing	17	15	32
Cycling BMX	3	3	6
Cycling mountain bike	6	3	9
Cycling road	10	8	18
Cycling track	10	9	19
Gymnastics (men and women)	5	5	10
Rowing	30	37	67
Sport climbing	10	9	19
Table tennis	5	7	12
Triathlon	7	6	13
Total	171	171	342

== Athletics ==
Germany entered the following athletes.

Key

- Q = Qualified for the next round
- q = Qualified for the next round as a fastest loser or, in field events, by position without achieving the qualifying target
- NR = National record
- PB = Personal best
- SB = Season best
- N/A = Round not applicable for the event

=== Men ===
Track and road events

Athlete	Event	Heat		Semifinal		Final	
Athlete	Event	Result	Rank	Result	Rank	Result	Rank
Owen Ansah	100 metres	Bye		10.20	10	did not advance	
Lucas Ansah-Peprah	100 metres	Bye		10.19	9	did not advance	
Julian Wagner	100 metres	Bye		10.21	13	did not advance	
Owen Ansah	200 metres	Bye		20.48	12	did not advance	
Robin Erewa	200 metres	21.12	21	did not advance			
Joshua Hartmann	200 metres	Bye		20.33 PB	4 Q	20.50	5
Manuel Sanders	400 metres	46.19	19	did not advance			
Marvin Schlegel	400 metres	46.21	20	did not advance			
Patrick Schneider	400 metres	45.58	6 Q	45.92	15	did not advance	
Christoph Kessler	800 metres	1:47.72	17	did not advance			
Marc Reuther	800 metres	1:48.33	28	did not advance			
Christoph Kessler	1500 metres	3:39.32	13	—N/a		did not advance	
Mohamed Mohumed	1500 metres	3:45.53	26	—N/a		did not advance	
Davor Aaron Bienenfeld	5000 metres	—N/a				13:45.70	20
Sam Parsons	5000 metres	—N/a				13:30.38	6
Filimon Abraham	10,000 metres	—N/a				28:53.54	19
Samuel Fitwi Sibhatu	10,000 metres	—N/a				28:03.92 PB	9
Nils Voigt	10,000 metres	—N/a				28:02.19	8
Simon Boch	Marathon	—N/a				2:21:39 SB	50
Johannes Motschmann	Marathon	—N/a				2:14:52 SB	15
Amanal Petros	Marathon	—N/a				2:10:39 SB	4
Hendrik Pfeiffer	Marathon	—N/a				2:16:04	24
Richard Ringer	Marathon	—N/a				2:10:21 SB	1st place, gold medalist(s)
Konstantin Wedel	Marathon	—N/a				2:16:09	25
Simon Boch; Johannes Motschmann; Amanal Petros; Hendrik Pfeiffer; Richard Ringer; Konstantin Wedel	Marathon team	—N/a				6:35:52	2nd place, silver medalist(s)
Gregor Traber	110 metres hurdles	13.69	3 Q	13.72	16	did not advance	
Joshua Abuaku	400 metres hurdles	Bye		49.05	5 Q	48.79 PB	5
Constantin Preis	400 metres hurdles	49.63 SB	6 Q	49.55 SB	15	did not advance	
Karl Bebendorf	3000 metres steeplechase	8:31.67	4 Q	—N/a		8:26.49	5
Niklas Buchholz	3000 metres steeplechase	8:33.89	12 q	—N/a		8:37.51	14
Frederik Ruppert	3000 metres steeplechase	9:01.93	28	—N/a		did not advance	
Nils Brembach	20 kilometres walk	—N/a				DQ	
Karl Junghannß	20 kilometres walk	—N/a				1:28:21	20
Leo Köpp	20 kilometres walk	—N/a				1:21:36 SB	9
Carl Dohmann	35 kilometres walk	—N/a				2:36:52	8
Jonathan Hilbert	35 kilometres walk	—N/a				2:32:44 PB	5
Christopher Linke	35 kilometres walk	—N/a				2:29:30 PB	2nd place, silver medalist(s)
Owen Ansah; Lucas Ansah-Peprah; Joshua Hartmann; Kevin Kranz	4 × 100 metres relay	37.97 NR	1 Q	—N/a		DNF	
Marc Koch; Manuel Sanders; Marvin Schlegel; Patrick Schneider	4 × 400 metres relay	3:01.80 SB	3 Q	—N/a		3:02.51	7

Field events

Athlete	Event	Qualification		Final	
Athlete	Event	Distance	Position	Distance	Position
Tobias Potye	High jump	2.21	1 q	2.27	2nd place, silver medalist(s)
Mateusz Przybylko	High jump	2.21	7 q	2.23	6
Jonas Wagner	High jump	2.21	5 q	NM	
Torben Blech	Pole vault	5.65	5 q	5.50	8
Bo Kanda Lita Baehre	Pole vault	5.65	1 q	5.85	2nd place, silver medalist(s)
Oleg Zernikel	Pole vault	5.65	1 q	5.50	9
Maximilian Entholzner	Long jump	5.63	21	did not advance	
Fabian Heinle	Long jump	7.64	15	did not advance	
Simon Bayer	Shot put	19.91	12 q	19.83	11
Torben Brandt	Discus throw	56.33	24	did not advance	
Henrik Janssen	Discus throw	62.60	7 q	61.11	10
Martin Wierig	Discus throw	DNS			
Andreas Hofmann	Javelin throw	77.29	11 q	74.75	11
Thomas Röhler	Javelin throw	71.31	22	did not advance	
Julian Weber	Javelin throw	80.99	2 q	87.66	1st place, gold medalist(s)

Combined events – Decathlon

Athlete	Event	100 m	LJ	SP	HJ	400 m	110H	DT	PV	JT	1500 m	Final	Rank
Arthur Abele	Result	11.24	7.01	15.06 SB	1.81	50.37	14.50	42.38	4.50 SB	60.98 SB	4:40.94 SB	7662 SB	15
Arthur Abele	Points	808	816	793	636	798	911	713	760	753	674	7662 SB	15
Niklas Kaul	Result	11.16 PB	7.10	14.90 SB	2.02	47.87 PB	14.45	41.80	4.90	76.05 CB	4:10.04 PB	8545 SB	1st place, gold medalist(s)
Niklas Kaul	Points	825	838	784	822	915	917	701	880	982	881	8545 SB	1st place, gold medalist(s)
Kai Kazmirek	Result	11.15	7.25	14.09	2.02	48.24 SB	14.42	45.18	5.00 =SB	61.23	4:46.82	8151	8
Kai Kazmirek	Points	827	874	734	822	898	921	771	910	756	638	8151	8
Tim Nowak	Result	11.51	6.97	14.27	2.08 PB	DNS	DNF						
Tim Nowak	Points	750	807	745	878	DNS	DNF						

=== Women ===
Track and road events

Athlete	Event	Heat		Semifinal		Final	
Athlete	Event	Result	Rank	Result	Rank	Result	Rank
Rebekka Haase	100 metres	11.50	13 Q	11.52	18	did not advance	
Gina Lückenkemper	100 metres	Bye		11.11	3 Q	10.99 =SB	1st place, gold medalist(s)
Tatjana Pinto	100 metres	11.43	5 Q	11.55	21	did not advance	
Alexandra Burghardt	200 metres	23.16	8 Q	23.05	6 q	23.24	8
Corinna Schwab	200 metres	Bye		23.44	15	did not advance	
Jessica-Bianca Wessolly	200 metres	23.14 SB	7 Q	23.47	17	did not advance	
Alica Schmidt	400 metres	52.52	12 Q	53.12	23	did not advance	
Corinna Schwab	400 metres	Bye		52.70	21	did not advance	
Christina Hering	800 metres	2:03.00	15 Q	2:00.86	5 q	2:00.82	7
Majtie Kolberg	800 metres	2:02.52	9 q	2:01.20 SB	9	did not advance	
Tanja Spill	800 metres	2:04.60	27	did not advance			
Hanna Klein	1500 metres	4:03.46 SB	3 Q	—N/a		4:05.49	5
Katharina Trost	1500 metres	4:07.20	13 Q	—N/a		4:06.95	10
Sara Benfarès	5000 metres	—N/a				15:20.94 PB	11
Konstanze Klosterhalfen	5000 metres	—N/a				14:50.47	1st place, gold medalist(s)
Alina Reh	5000 metres	—N/a				DNF	
Konstanze Klosterhalfen	10,000 metres	—N/a				31:05.21	4
Alina Reh	10,000 metres	—N/a				32:14.02	8
Miriam Dattke	Marathon	—N/a				2:28:52	4
Domenika Meyer	Marathon	—N/a				2:29:21	6
Kristina Hendel	Marathon	—N/a				2:35:14	20
Deborah Schöneborn	Marathon	—N/a				2:30:35	10
Rabea Schöneborn	Marathon	—N/a				2:31:36	12
Katharina Steinruck	Marathon	—N/a				2:32:41 SB	15
Miriam Dattke; Kristina Hendel; Domenika Meyer; Deborah Schöneborn; Rabea Schöneborn; Katharina Steinruck	Marathon team	—N/a				7:28:48	1st place, gold medalist(s)
Monika Zapalska	100 metres hurdles	13.39	12	did not advance			
Eileen Demes	400 metres hurdles	57.11	17	did not advance			
Carolina Krafzik	400 metres hurdles	54.32 PB	1 Q	55.29	8 Q	56.02	8
Gisèle Wender	400 metres hurdles	57.09	15	did not advance			
Elena Burkard	3000 metres steeplechase	9:43.97	11 q	—N/a		9:39.63 SB	12
Olivia Gürth	3000 metres steeplechase	9:50.95	16	—N/a		did not advance	
Lea Meyer	3000 metres steeplechase	9:39.55	5 Q	—N/a		9:15.35 PB	2nd place, silver medalist(s)
Saskia Feige	20 kilometres walk	—N/a				1:29:25 PB	3rd place, bronze medalist(s)
Katrin Schusters	35 kilometres walk	—N/a				3:18:38	17
Alexandra Burghardt; Rebekka Haase; Gina Lückenkemper; Lisa Mayer; Jessica-Bianca Wessolly (*)	4 × 100 metres relay	43.33	5 Q	—N/a		42.34	1st place, gold medalist(s)
Carolina Krafzik; Mona Mayer; Alica Schmidt; Luna Thiel; Jessica-Bianca Wessolly (*)	4 × 400 metres relay	3:27.92	8 q	—N/a		3:26.09 SB	5

Field events

Athlete	Event	Qualification		Final	
Athlete	Event	Distance	Position	Distance	Position
Marie-Laurence Jungfleisch	High jump	1.87	1 q	1.90 SB	6
Bianca Stichling	High jump	1.83	18	did not advance	
Anjuli Knäsche	Pole vault	4.40	14	did not advance	
Jacqueline Otchere	Pole vault	4.10	23	did not advance	
Mikaelle Assani	Long jump	6.46	13	did not advance	
Merle Homeier	Long jump	6.49	12 q	6.42	9
Maryse Luzolo	Long jump	6.28	18	did not advance	
Malaika Mihambo	Long jump	6.99	1 Q	7.03	2nd place, silver medalist(s)
Neele Eckhardt-Noack	Triple jump	14.53 PB	1 Q	14.45	4
Kristin Gierisch	Triple jump	13.59	16	did not advance	
Jessie Maduka	Triple jump	12.11	22	did not advance	
Sara Gambetta	Shot put	18.53	5 q	18.48	5
Katharina Maisch	Shot put	18.65	3 Q	18.01	8
Julia Ritter	Shot put	17.80	7 q	18.29	6
Shanice Craft	Discus throw	62.64	5 q	62.78	7
Kristin Pudenz	Discus throw	64.25	3 Q	67.87 PB	2nd place, silver medalist(s)
Claudine Vita	Discus throw	63.51	4 Q	65.20 SB	3rd place, bronze medalist(s)
Annika Marie Fuchs	Javelin throw	59.90	6 q	54.52	11
Jana Marie Lowka	Javelin throw	52.98	21	did not advance	
Lea Wipper	Javelin throw	55.07	17	did not advance	
Samantha Borutta	Hammer throw	67.40	15	did not advance	

Combined events – Heptathlon

Athlete	Event	100H	HJ	SP	200 m	LJ	JT	800 m	Final	Rank
Carolin Schäfer	Result	13.39 SB	1.74 SB	13.68	24.16 SB	5.82	50.18 SB	2:17.55	6223 SB	6
Carolin Schäfer	Points	1066	903	773	965	795	864	857	6223 SB	6
Sophie Weißenberg	Result	13.72	1.80 =SB	13.26	24.16	6.35	46.73	DNS	DNF	
Sophie Weißenberg	Points	1018	978	745	965	959	797	DNS	DNF	

== Beach volleyball ==
Germany has qualified 4 male and 5 female pairs.

=== Men ===
Athlete	Event	Preliminary round			Round of 24	Round of 16	Quarterfinals	Semifinals	Final / BM	
Athlete	Event	Opposition Score	Opposition Score	Rank	Opposition Score	Opposition Score	Opposition Score	Opposition Score	Opposition Score	Rank
Nils Ehlers; Clemens Wickler	Men's	Abell – Brinck (DEN); W 2–1 (18–21, 21–14, 20–18)	Hörl – Horst (AUT); L 1–2 (16–21, 21–15, 14–16)	2 Q	Huber – Dressler (AUT); W 2–1 (21–17, 19–21, 15–12)	Krattiger – Breer (SUI); W 2–0 (21–15, 32–30)	Mol – Sørum (NOR); L 0–2 (15–21, 14–21)	did not advance		
Simon Pfretzschner; Philipp Huster	Men's	Brouwer – Meeuwsen (NED); L 0–2 (14–21, 13–21)	Samoilovs – Šmēdiņš (LAT); L 0–2 (15–21, 17–21)	4	did not advance					
Robin Sowa; Lukas Pfretzschner	Men's	Perušič – Schweiner (CZE); L 1–2 (24–26, 21–17, 9–15)	Ermacora – Pristauz (AUT); W 2–1 (19–21, 25–23, 15–13)	3 Q	Nõlvak – Tiisaar (EST); L 0–2 (14–21, 17–21)	did not advance				
Sven Winter; Paul Henning	Men's	Bryl – Łosiak (POL); L 0–2 (14–21, 15–21)	Huber – Dressler (AUT); L 1–2 (21–13, 18–21, 12–15)	4	did not advance					

=== Women ===
Athlete	Event	Preliminary round			Round of 24	Round of 16	Quarterfinals	Semifinals	Final / BM	
Athlete	Event	Opposition Score	Opposition Score	Rank	Opposition Score	Opposition Score	Opposition Score	Opposition Score	Opposition Score	Rank
Karla Borger; Julia Sude	Women's	Baieva – Lazarenko (UKR); W 2–0 (21–13, 21–14)	Gottardi – Menegatti (ITA); W 2–0 (21–19, 21–19)	1 Q	Bye	Scampoli – Bianchin (ITA); W 2–1 (18–21, 21–14, 15–8)	Graudiņa – Kravčenoka (LAT); L 0–2 (18–21, 18–21)	did not advance		
Sandra Ittlinger; Isabel Schneider	Women's	van Driel – Ypma (NED); W 2–0 (21–15, 22–20)	Kociołek – Łodej (POL); W 2–1 (19–21, 21–16, 15–13)	1 Q	Bye	Gottardi – Menegatti (ITA); L 1–2 (21–16, 16–21, 12–15)	did not advance			
Chantal Laboureur; Sarah Schulz	Women's	Klinger – Klinger (AUT); W 2–0 (21–10, 21–13)	Kotnik – Lovšin (SLO); W 2–1 (19–21, 23–21, 30–28)	1 Q	Bye	Böbner – Vergé-Dépré (SUI); W 2–1 (18–21, 21–13, 15–9)	Brunner – Hüberli (SUI); L 0–2 (12–21, 15–21)	did not advance		
Svenja Müller; Cinja Tillmann	Women's	Vieira – Chamereau (FRA); W 2–0 (21–14, 21–15)	Álvarez – Moreno (ESP); L 1–2 (14–21, 21–19, 12–15)	2 Q	Scampoli – Bianchin (ITA); L 1–2 (21–12, 19–21, 17–21)	did not advance				
Kira Walkenhorst; Louisa Lippmann	Women's	Brunner – Hüberli (SUI); L 0–2 (19–21, 9–21)	Paulikienė – Kliokmanaitė (LTU); W 2–1 (21–15, 17–21, 15–12)	3 Q	Böbner – Vergé-Dépré (SUI); L 0–2 (19–21, 20–22)	did not advance				

== Canoeing ==
Men

Athlete	Event	Heats		Semifinals		Final	
Athlete	Event	Time	Rank	Time	Rank	Time	Rank
Fabien Schatz	C-1 200 m	42.319	7 SF	41.140	6	did not advance	
Sebastian Brendel	C-1 5000 m	—N/a				22:50.803	1st place, gold medalist(s)
Sebastian Brendel; Tim Hecker	C-2 500 m	1:44.970	1 F	Bye		1:45.510	3rd place, bronze medalist(s)
Sebastian Brendel; Tim Hecker	C-2 1000 m	—N/a				3:32.896	1st place, gold medalist(s)
Jonas Draeger	K-1 200 m	36.213	4 SF	35.868	1 F	37.309	7
Jacob Schopf	K-1 500 m	1:43.083	1 F	Bye		1:38.012	1st place, gold medalist(s)
Jakob Thordsen	K-1 1000 m	3:34.741	2 SF	3:34.797	1 F	3:34.754	4
Max Rendschmidt	K-1 5000 m	—N/a				21:08.548	7
Jonas Draeger; Moritz Florstedt	K-2 200 m	32.585	4 SF	32.506	1 F	32.024	4
Felix Frank; Moritz Florstedt	K-2 500 m	1:32.209	1 F	Bye		1:31.434	2nd place, silver medalist(s)
Martin Hiller; Tamás Grossmann	K-2 1000 m	3:15.562	1 F	Bye		3:13.812	1st place, gold medalist(s)
Max Rendschmidt; Tom Liebscher; Jacob Schopf; Max Lemke	K-4 500 m	1:20.967	1 F	Bye		1:20.282	1st place, gold medalist(s)
Tobias Schultz; Tom Liebscher; Martin Hiller; Felix Frank	K-4 1000 m	—N/a				2:53.174	1st place, gold medalist(s)
Anas Al Khalifa	KL1 200 m	—N/a				50.305	5
Anas Al Khalifa	VL2 200 m	—N/a				1:02.870	7

Women

Athlete	Event	Heats		Semifinals		Final	
Athlete	Event	Time	Rank	Time	Rank	Time	Rank
Lisa Jahn	C-1 200 m	48.090	2 F	Bye		50.410	5
Annika Loske	C-1 500 m	—N/a				2:11.811	7
Annika Loske	C-1 5000 m	—N/a				26:42.746	2nd place, silver medalist(s)
Lisa Jahn; Sophie Koch	C-2 200 m	—N/a				44.879	3rd place, bronze medalist(s)
Lisa Jahn; Sophie Koch	C-2 500 m	—N/a				2:00.708	4
Jule Hake	K-1 500 m	1:53.719	1 F	Bye		1:55.386	5
Paulina Paszek; Jule Hake	K-2 200 m	—N/a				38.690	3rd place, bronze medalist(s)
Paulina Paszek; Jule Hake	K-2 500 m	1:44.968	1 F	Bye		1:42.702	3rd place, bronze medalist(s)
Julia Hergert; Caroline Arft	K-2 1000 m	3:47.035	3 F	Bye		3:40.120	5
Paulina Paszek; Lena Röhlings; Caroline Arft; Katharina Diederichs	K-4 500 m	1:36.661	3 F	Bye		1:37.792	4
Edina Müller	KL1 200 m	—N/a				52.776	1st place, gold medalist(s)
Anja Adler	KL2 200 m	—N/a				51.132	4
Felicia Laberer	KL3 200 m	—N/a				48.566	4
Esther Bode	VL1 200 m	—N/a				1:22.677	2nd place, silver medalist(s)
Lillemor Köper	VL1 200 m	—N/a				1:20.886	1st place, gold medalist(s)
Katharina Bauernschmidt	VL2 200 m	—N/a				1:04.521	3rd place, bronze medalist(s)
Anja Adler	VL3 200 m	—N/a				1:05.352	4

== Cycling ==
=== Road ===
Men

Athlete	Event	Time	Rank
Pascal Ackermann	Road race	DNF	
Phil Bauhaus	Road race	4:38:49	18
John Degenkolb	Road race	4:41:14	96
Nico Denz	Road race	4:45:52	123
Miguel Heidemann	Time trial	28:51.42	16
Roger Kluge	Road race	4:39:55	83
Alexander Krieger	Road race	4:39:55	84
Nils Politt	Road race	4:41:14	95
Michael Schwarzmann	Road race	4:42:01	103
Maximilian Walscheid	Time trial	29:47.17	25

Women

Athlete	Event	Time	Rank
Franziska Brauße	Road race	3:02:12	82
Lisa Brennauer	Road race	2:59:20	4
Lisa Brennauer	Time trial	32:57.73	12
Romy Kasper	Road race	2:59:30	38
Lisa Klein	Road race	3:02:12	81
Lisa Klein	Time trial	34:35.26	22
Franziska Koch	Road race	3:02:12	80
Mieke Kröger	Road race	2:59:44	49
Liane Lippert	Road race	2:59:30	31
Lea Lin Teutenberg	Road race	3:00:26	58

=== Track ===
Elimination race

Athlete	Event	Final
Athlete	Event	Rank
Theo Reinhardt	Men's elimination race	2nd place, silver medalist(s)
Lea Lin Teutenberg	Women's elimination race	7

Keirin

Athlete	Event	1st Round	Repechage	2nd Round	Final
Athlete	Event	Rank	Rank	Rank	Rank
Maximilian Dörnbach	Men's keirin	1 SF	Bye	1 F1-6	2nd place, silver medalist(s)
Marc Jurczyk	Men's keirin	1 SF	Bye	1 F1-6	6
Lea Sophie Friedrich	Women's keirin	1 SF	Bye	1 F1-6	1st place, gold medalist(s)
Emma Hinze	Women's keirin	DNS			

Madison

Athlete	Event	Final	
Athlete	Event	Points	Rank
Roger Kluge; Theo Reinhardt	Men's madison	101	1st place, gold medalist(s)
Franziska Brauße; Lea Lin Teutenberg	Women's madison	6	6

Omnium

Athlete	Event	Qualification		Scratch Race		Tempo Race		Elimination Race		Points Race		Total points	Rank
Athlete	Event	Rank	Points	Rank	Points	Rank	Points	Rank	Points	Rank	Points	Total points	Rank
Moritz Malcharek	Men's omnium	3 Q	7	11	20	11	20	7	28	7	23	91	9
Lea Lin Teutenberg	Women's omnium	—N/a		6	30	12	18	6	30	6	48	126	6

Points race

Athlete	Event	Final	
Athlete	Event	Points	Rank
Roger Kluge	Men's points race	104	4
Lena Charlotte Reißner	Women's points race	−19	12

Pursuit

Athlete	Event	Qualification		Semifinals		Final	
Athlete	Event	Time	Rank	Opponent Results	Rank	Opponent Results	Rank
Tobias Buck-Gramcko	Men's individual pursuit	4:16.778	8	—N/a		did not advance	
Nicolas Heinrich	Men's individual pursuit	4:08.995	1 QG	—N/a		Plebani (ITA); W 4:09.320	1st place, gold medalist(s)
Lisa Brennauer	Women's individual pursuit	3:21.138	1 QG	—N/a		Kröger (GER); L 3:23.566	2nd place, silver medalist(s)
Mieke Kröger	Women's individual pursuit	3:23.569	2 QG	—N/a		Brennauer (GER); W 3:22.469	1st place, gold medalist(s)
Tobias Buck-Gramcko; Nicolas Heinrich; Theo Reinhardt; Leon Rohde	Men's team pursuit	3:56.239	5 Q	Belgium; W 3:53.167	3 QB	Great Britain; L 3:55.841	4
Franziska Brauße; Lisa Brennauer; Lisa Klein; Mieke Kröger	Women's team pursuit	4:14.688	1 Q	Great Britain; W 4:14.665	2 QG	Italy; W 4:10.872	1st place, gold medalist(s)

Scratch

Athlete	Event	Final	
Athlete	Event	Laps down	Rank
Moritz Malcharek	Men's scratch	-2	2nd place, silver medalist(s)
Lea Lin Teutenberg	Women's scratch	0	15

Sprint

Athlete	Event	Qualification		Round 1	Round 2	Quarterfinals	Semifinals	Final	
Athlete	Event	Time Speed (km/h)	Rank	Opposition Time Speed (km/h)	Opposition Time Speed (km/h)	Opposition Time Speed (km/h)	Opposition Time Speed (km/h)	Opposition Time Speed (km/h)	Rank
Maximilian Dörnbach	Men's sprint	9.785; 73.582	6	Bye	Čechman (CZE); W 10.536; 68.337	Vigier (FRA); W 10.570, L, L	did not advance		
Marc Jurczyk	Men's sprint	9.839; 73.138	7	Bye	Turnbull (GBR); L 10.526; 68.402	did not advance			
Lea Sophie Friedrich	Women's sprint	10.543; 68.291	4	Bye	Walsh (IRL); W 11.395; 63.185	Lohviniuk (UKR); W 10.916, W 10.894	Gros (FRA); L, L	van Riessen (NED); L, L	4
Emma Hinze	Women's sprint	10.372; 69.417	2	Bye	Jaborníková (CZE); W 11.253; 63.982	Capewell (GBR); W 11.057, W 11.198	van Riessen (NED); W 11.168, W 11.195	Gros (FRA); W 11.130, L, W 11.081	1st place, gold medalist(s)

Team sprint

Athlete	Event	Qualification		Semifinals		Final	
Athlete	Event	Time	Rank	Opponent Results	Rank	Opponent Results	Rank
Maximilian Dörnbach; Marc Jurczyk; Nik Schröter	Men's team sprint	36.096	5 Q	Poland; L 35.915	5	did not advance	
Lea Sophie Friedrich; Pauline Grabosch; Emma Hinze	Women's team sprint	38.097	1	No opponent 38.114	1 QG	Netherlands; W 38.061	1st place, gold medalist(s)

Time trial

Athlete	Event	Qualifying		Final	
Athlete	Event	Time	Rank	Time	Rank
Maximilian Dörnbach	Men's 1 km time trial	59.918	3 Q	1:00.225	3rd place, bronze medalist(s)
Marc Jurczyk	Men's 1 km time trial	1:00.590	6 Q	1:00.879	6
Pauline Grabosch	Women's 500 m time trial	33.544	4 Q	33.684	5
Emma Hinze	Women's 500 m time trial	32.732	1 Q	32.667	1st place, gold medalist(s)

=== Mountain bike ===
Athlete	Event	Time	Rank
Maximilian Brandl	Men's cross-country	1:21:09	28
Georg Egger	Men's cross-country	1:21:17	31
David List	Men's cross-country	1:19:22	13
Niklas Schehl	Men's cross-country	DNF	
Julian Schelb	Men's cross-country	1:20:33	21
Luca Schwarzbauer	Men's cross-country	1:18:57	10
Leonie Daubermann	Women's cross-country	1:35:51	17
Nadine Rieder	Women's cross-country	1:36:26	18
Lia Schrievers	Women's cross-country	1:38:11	26

=== BMX freestyle ===
Athlete	Event	Qualification		Final	
Athlete	Event	Points	Rank	Points	Rank
Michael Meisel	Men's	58.20	15	did not advance	
Timo Schulze	Men's	71.20	8 Q	78.60	6
Paul Thölen	Men's	70.70	9 Q	78.00	8
Rebecca Gruhn	Women's	46.80	8 Q	59.20	7
Lara Lessmann	Women's	73.40	3 Q	75.30	4
Kim Lea Müller	Women's	63.60	5 Q	78.60	2nd place, silver medalist(s)

== Gymnastics ==
Germany has entered 5 men and 5 women.

=== Men ===
Qualification

Athlete	Event	Qualification								Final							
Athlete	Event	Apparatus						Total	Rank	Apparatus						Total	Rank
Athlete	Event	F	PH	R	V	PB	HB	Total	Rank	F	PH	R	V	PB	HB	Total	Rank
Lukas Dauser	Team	13.766	13.166	13.333	13.633	14.766 Q	13.500	82.164	9	13.733	—N/a	13.066	13.966	15.533	13.300	—N/a	
Nils Dunkel	Team	—N/a	14.366 Q	13.400	—N/a	13.566	—N/a	—N/a		—N/a	14.466	12.000	—N/a	14.066	—N/a	—N/a	
Lucas Kochan	Team	13.233	—N/a		14.200	—N/a	13.733	—N/a		11.366	—N/a		14.500	—N/a	13.500	—N/a	
Andreas Toba	Team	13.166	13.866	13.966	12.866	12.766	11.933	78.563	33	—N/a	13.666	13.566	14.066	—N/a	13.266	—N/a	
Glenn Trebing	Team	13.800	13.666	13.133	13.766	12.366	12.333	79.064	29	10.900	13.633	—N/a		12.766	—N/a	—N/a	
Total	Team	40.799	41.898	40.699	41.599	41.098	39.566	245.659	7 Q	35.999	41.765	38.632	42.532	42.365	40.066	241.359	7

Individual finals

Athlete	Event	Apparatus						Total	Rank
Athlete	Event	F	PH	R	V	PB	HB	Total	Rank
Lukas Dauser	Parallel bars	—N/a				13.633	—N/a	13.633	8
Nils Dunkel	Pommel horse	—N/a	14.633	—N/a				14.633	3rd place, bronze medalist(s)

=== Women ===
Qualification

Athlete	Event	Qualification						Final					
Athlete	Event	Apparatus				Total	Rank	Apparatus				Total	Rank
Athlete	Event	V	UB	BB	F	Total	Rank	V	UB	BB	F	Total	Rank
Kim Bui	Team	13.100	14.200 Q	12.833	12.866	52.999	9	13.266	13.433	—N/a	13.033	—N/a	
Emma Malewski	Team	12.966	13.100	13.500 Q	12.466	52.032	14	—N/a	13.100	12.700	—N/a	—N/a	
Elisabeth Seitz	Team	13.100	14.200 Q	—N/a				13.333	14.300	—N/a		—N/a	
Pauline Schäfer-Betz	Team	—N/a		13.166 Q	12.766	—N/a		—N/a		13.733	12.433	—N/a	
Sarah Voss	Team	13.433	13.100	12.266	12.100	50.899	17	14.333	—N/a	13.500	11.266	—N/a	
Total	Team	39.633	41.500	39.499	38.098	158.730	4 Q	40.932	40.833	39.933	36.732	158.430	3rd place, bronze medalist(s)

Individual finals

Athlete	Event	Apparatus				Rank
Athlete	Event	V	UB	BB	F	Rank
Kim Bui	Uneven bars	—N/a	14.066	—N/a		5
Emma Malewski	Balance beam	—N/a		13.466	—N/a	1st place, gold medalist(s)
Pauline Schäfer-Betz	Balance beam	—N/a		13.200	—N/a	5
Elisabeth Seitz	Uneven bars	—N/a	14.433	—N/a		1st place, gold medalist(s)

== Rowing ==
Men

Athlete	Event	Heats		Repechage		Semifinals		Final	
Athlete	Event	Time	Rank	Time	Rank	Time	Rank	Time	Rank
Oliver Zeidler	Single sculls	7:54.70	1 SA/B	Bye		7:12.00	1 FA	7:19.67	4
Theis Hagemeister; Malte Großmann; Max John; Marc Kammann	Coxless four	6:46.39	4 R	6:35.32	3 FB	—N/a		6:10.41	7
Olaf Roggensack; Jasper Angl; Julian Garth; Laurits Follert; Benedict Eggeling; Torben Johannesen; Wolf-Niclas Schröder; Mattes Schönherr; Jonas Wiesen	Eight	6:01.68	2	—N/a				5:55.45	4
Simon Klüter; Johannes Ursprung; Fabio Kress; Joachim Agne	Lightweight quadruple sculls	7:08.91	2	—N/a				6:24.14	2

Women

Athlete	Event	Heats		Repechage		Semifinals		Final	
Athlete	Event	Time	Rank	Time	Rank	Time	Rank	Time	Rank
Alexandra Föster	Single sculls	9:13.83	4 R	8:32.98	1 SA/B	8:06.85	2 FA	8:09.86	3rd place, bronze medalist(s)
Judith Guhse; Sophie Leupold	Double sculls	8:04.87	4 R	7:48.13	2 SA/B	7:40.04	5 FB	7:20.39	9
Sarah Wibberenz; Frauke Hundeling; Marie-Sophie Zeidler; Pia Greiten	Quadruple sculls	7:19.80	3 R	6:53.00	3 FA	—N/a		7:10.63	6
Lena Osterkamp; Marie-Cathérine Arnold	Coxless pair	8:08.74	5 R	7:50.85	6 FB	—N/a		7:44.08	10
Christin Stöhner; Paula Rossen; Paula Hartmann; Hanna Winter	Coxless four	7:43.72	5 R	7:22.10	6 'FB	—N/a		7:13.39	10
Hannah Reif; Lena Sarassa; Melanie Göldner; Alyssa Meyer; Nora Peuser; Tabea Kuhnert; Lisa Gutfleisch; Katja Fuhrmann; Larina Hillemann	Eight	6:59.09	4 R	Bye		—N/a		6:46.28	5
Marie-Louise Dräger	Lightweight single sculls	9:01.67	4 R	8:18.10	2 FA	—N/a		8:24.81	6
Marion Reichardt; Johanna Reichardt	Lightweight double sculls	8:03.89	5 R	7:41.46	3 FB	—N/a		7:44.62	9
Rieke Hülsen; Romy Dreher; Katrin Volk; Cosima Clotten	Lightweight quadruple sculls	7:04.21	2	—N/a				7:03.81	2
Manuela Diening	PR1 single sculls	11:53.89	2	—N/a				11:07.89	2nd place, silver medalist(s)

Mixed

Athlete	Event	Heats		Final	
Athlete	Event	Time	Rank	Time	Rank
Leopold Reimann; Sylvia Pille-Steppat	PR2 double sculls	10:22.27	5	9:46.35	5
Jan Helmich; Susanne Lackner; Katharina Marchand; Marc Lembeck; Inga Thöne	PR3 coxed four	8:15.74	4	7:33.17	3rd place, bronze medalist(s)

== Sport climbing ==
Boulder

Athlete	Event	Qualification		Semifinal		Final	
Athlete	Event	Result	Rank	Result	Rank	Result	Rank
Yannick Flohé	Men's boulder	3T5z 11 18	4 Q	0T2z 0 2	13	did not advance	
Max Kleesattel	Men's boulder	1T4z 2 6	11	did not advance			
Philipp Martin	Men's boulder	0T2z 0 7	26	did not advance			
Alexander Megos	Men's boulder	2T4z 2 12	7 Q	0T2z 0 6	14	did not advance	
Christoph Schweiger	Men's boulder	3T5z 9 10	3 Q	1T2z 7 8	8	did not advance	
Alma Bestvater	Women's boulder	2T5z 6 13	4 Q	0T2z 0 2	16	did not advance	
Afra Hönig	Women's boulder	2T3z 10 12	12	did not advance			
Leonie Lochner	Women's boulder	1T2z 1 2	20	did not advance			
Hannah Meul	Women's boulder	3T4z 14 17	7 Q	3T4z 8 10	3 Q	2T3z 3 4	2nd place, silver medalist(s)
Roxana Wienand	Women's boulder	2T4z 15 19	11	did not advance			

Combined

Athlete	Event	Qualification		Final						
Athlete	Event	Total	Rank	Boulder		Lead			Total	Rank
Athlete	Event	Total	Rank	Points	Place	Hold	Points	Place	Total	Rank
Yannick Flohé	Men's	775	10	did not advance						
Philipp Martin	Men's	55	27	did not advance						
Alexander Megos	Men's	785	9	did not advance						
Hannah Meul	Women's	1260	2 Q	80.9	2	43	85.0	5	165.9	4

Lead

Athlete	Event	Qualification								Semifinal			Final		
Athlete	Event	Hold	Time	Rank	Hold	Time	Rank	Points	Rank	Hold	Time	Rank	Hold	Time	Rank
Yannick Flohé	Men's lead	46+	3:15	=3	Top	5:41	=1	3.74	3 Q	40+	3:49	7 Q	29+	3:02	6
Sebastian Halenke	Men's lead	14+	3:10	=46	38+	4:02	=28	36.92	38	did not advance					
Philipp Martin	Men's lead	30+	3:01	24	33	3:27	=31	27.50	30	did not advance					
Alexander Megos	Men's lead	47+	4:03	=1	Top	5:23	=1	2.29	1 Q	42	4:30	5 Q	30+	3:09	5
Käthe Atkins	Women's lead	35+	3:11	=22	22+	1:48	=34	28.98	29	did not advance					
Hannah Meul	Women's lead	46	3:40	=8	24+	2:14	=15	12.71	13 Q	27	2:39	5 Q	37	3:31	7

Speed

Athlete	Event	Qualification		Round of 16	Quarterfinal	Semifinal	Final	
Athlete	Event	Time	Rank	Opposition Time	Opposition Time	Opposition Time	Opposition Time	Rank
Linus Bader	Men's	7.248	21	did not advance				
Leander Carmanns	Men's	6.180	13 Q	Mawem (FRA); L 6.828	did not advance			
Sebastian Lucke	Men's	5.973	9 Q	Boulos (ITA); L 9.172	did not advance			
Dorian Zedler	Men's	6.668	20	did not advance				
Anna Apel	Women's	9.015	15 Q	Kalucka (POL); L 8.420	did not advance			
Nuria Brockfeld	Women's	8.565	10 Q	Viglione (FRA); W 8.151	Kalucka (POL); L 10.564	did not advance		
Julia Koch	Women's	8.908	13 Q	Brożek (POL); L 9.919	did not advance			

== Table tennis ==
Germany entered 5 men and 7 women.

=== Men ===
Athlete	Event	Qualification stage				Preliminary Round 1	Preliminary Round 2	Round of 64	Round of 32	Round of 16	Quarterfinals	Semifinals	Final / BM	
Athlete	Event	Opposition Score	Opposition Score	Opposition Score	Rank	Opposition Score	Opposition Score	Opposition Score	Opposition Score	Opposition Score	Opposition Score	Opposition Score	Opposition Score	Rank
Timo Boll	Singles	Bye						Kulczycki (POL); W 4–3	Jančařík (CZE); W 4–0	Wang (SVK); W 4–0	Qiu (GER); L 0–4	did not advance		
Benedikt Duda	Singles	Bye						Piccolin (ITA); W 4–1	Habesohn (AUT); W 4–3	Qiu (GER); L 1–4	did not advance			
Patrick Franziska	Singles	Bye						Sirucek (CZE); W 4–0	Dyjas (POL); W 4–1	Apolónia (POR); L 2–4	did not advance			
Dimitrij Ovtcharov	Singles	Bye						Andersen (DEN); W 4–1	András (HUN); W 4–0	Freitas (POR); W 4–3	Karlsson (SWE); L 2–4	did not advance		
Dang Qiu	Singles	Bye						Gündüz (TUR); W 4–3	Sgouropoulos (GRE); W 4–0	Duda (GER); W 4–1	Boll (GER); W 4–0	Falck (SWE); W 4–1	Jorgić (SLO); W 4–1	1st place, gold medalist(s)
Benedikt Duda; Dang Qiu	Doubles	—N/a						Bye	Konstantinopoulos / Sgouropoulos (GRE); W 3–1	Pištej (SVK) / Karakašević (SRB); W 3–1	Gardos / Habesohn (AUT); L 2–3	did not advance		

=== Women ===
Athlete	Event	Qualification stage				Preliminary Round 1	Preliminary Round 2	Round of 64	Round of 32	Round of 16	Quarterfinals	Semifinals	Final / BM	
Athlete	Event	Opposition Score	Opposition Score	Opposition Score	Rank	Opposition Score	Opposition Score	Opposition Score	Opposition Score	Opposition Score	Opposition Score	Opposition Score	Opposition Score	Rank
Han Ying	Singles	Bye						Vignjević (SRB); W 4–0	Källberg (SWE); W 4–0	Winter (GER); L w/o	did not advance			
Annett Kaufmann	Singles	Avameri (EST); W 3–1	Terpou (GRE); W 3–0	—N/a	1 Q	Bye		Bajor (POL); L 3–4	did not advance					
Nina Mittelham	Singles	Bye						Lutz (FRA); W 4–1	Wan (GER); W 4–1	Dragoman (ROU); W 4–2	Yuan (FRA); W 4–3	Shan (GER); W 4–1	Polcanova (AUT); L retired	2nd place, silver medalist(s)
Franziska Schreiner	Singles	Chiriacova (MDA); W 3–0	Yılmaz (TUR); W 3–0	Gnjatić (BIH); W 3–0	1 Q	Bye		Xiao (ESP); L 3–4	did not advance					
Shan Xiaona	Singles	Bye						Plaian (ROU); W 4–0	Węgrzyn (POL); W 4–0	Samara (ROU); W 4–0	Shao (POR); W 4–3	Mittelham (GER); L 1–4	Did not advance	3rd place, bronze medalist(s)
Wan Yuan	Singles	Bye						Novakovska (CZE); W 4–2	Mittelham (GER); L 1–4	did not advance				
Sabine Winter	Singles	Bye						Guisnel (FRA); W 4–0	Ciobanu (ROU); W 4–3	Han (GER); W w/o	Piccolin (ITA); W 4–0	Polcanova (AUT); L 3–4	Did not advance	3rd place, bronze medalist(s)
Annett Kaufmann; Franziska Schreiner	Doubles	—N/a				Bye		Barbosa / Gonderinger (LUX); W 3–1	Gaponova / Bilenko (UKR); W 3–0	Mittelham / Winter (GER); L 0–3	did not advance			
Nina Mittelham; Sabine Winter	Doubles	—N/a				Bye			Węgrzyn / Wegrzyn (POL); W 3–2	Kaufmann / Schreiner (GER); W 3–0	Xiao (ESP) / Diaconu (ROU); L 1–3	did not advance		

=== Mixed ===
Athlete	Event	Round of 64	Round of 32	Round of 16	Quarterfinals	Semifinals	Final / BM	
Athlete	Event	Opposition Score	Opposition Score	Opposition Score	Opposition Score	Opposition Score	Opposition Score	Rank
Benedikt Duda; Sabine Winter	Doubles	Piccolin / Vivarelli (ITA); W 3–1	Glod / de Nutte (LUX); W 3–1	Pištej / Balážová (SVK); L 0–3	did not advance			
Qiu Dang; Nina Mittelham	Doubles	Bye	Möreghård / Bergström (SWE); W 3–2	Gardos / Polcanova (AUT); L 1–3	did not advance			

== Triathlon ==
=== Men ===
Athlete	Event	Swim (1.5 km)	Trans 1	Bike (40 km)	Trans 2	Run (10 km)	Total Time	Rank
Tim Hellwig	Men's	17:37	0:35	51:24	0:25	34:06	1:44:07	21
Lasse Lührs	Men's	18:30	0:36	51:14	0:24	32:56	1:43:38	18
Lasse Nygaard Priester	Men's	18:33	0:34	51:16	0:21	DNF		
Jannik Schaufler	Men's	18:10	0:33	51:39	0:21	34:58	1:45:41	35
Jonas Schomburg	Men's	17:41	0:34	51:20	0:24	32:09	1:42:08	7

=== Women ===
Athlete	Event	Swim (1.5 km)	Trans 1	Bike (40 km)	Trans 2	Run (10 km)	Total Time	Rank
Nina Eim	Women's	19:57	0:36	56:50	0:26	35:02	1:52:51	4
Marlene Gomez-Göggel	Women's	19:59	0:33	58:18	0:27	36:56	1:56:13	19
Anabel Knoll	Women's	19:47	0:36	57:01	0:27	DNF		
Annika Koch	Women's	20:03	0:33	56:46	0:27	35:55	1:53:44	10
Laura Lindemann	Women's	19:22	0:37	57:20	0:26	34:34	1:52:19	2nd place, silver medalist(s)
Lisa Tertsch	Women's	19:32	0:33	57:14	0:26	36:18	1:54:03	13

=== Mixed ===
Athlete	Event	Swim (300 m)	Trans 1	Bike (6.8 km)	Trans 2	Run (2 km)	Total Group Time	Rank
Valentin Wernz; Nina Eim; Simon Henseleit; Laura Lindemann	Mixed relay	15:31	2:51	46:15	1:32	19:46	1:26:03	2nd place, silver medalist(s)
