= 2022 UCI Track Cycling World Championships – Men's 1 km time trial =

Men's 1 km time trial at the 2022 UCI Track Cycling World Championships
- Venue: Vélodrome National
- Location: Saint-Quentin-en-Yvelines, France
- Dates: 14 October
- Competitors: 25 from 17 nations
- Winning time: 58.106

Medalists
| gold medal | Jeffrey Hoogland | Netherlands |
| silver medal | Melvin Landerneau | France |
| bronze medal | Alejandro Martínez | Spain |

The Men's 1 km time trial competition at the 2022 UCI Track Cycling World Championships was held on 14 October 2022.

== Results ==
=== Qualifying ===
The qualifying was started at 14:30. The top eight riders qualified for the final.

| Rank | Name | Nation | Time | Behind | Notes |
|---|---|---|---|---|---|
| 1 | Jeffrey Hoogland | Netherlands | 58.294 | | Q |
| 2 | Matteo Bianchi | Italy | 59.460 | +1.166 | Q |
| 3 | Melvin Landerneau | France | 59.549 | +1.255 | Q |
| 4 | Maximilian Dörnbach | Germany | 59.750 | +1.456 | Q |
| 5 | Yuta Obara | Japan | 59.796 | +1.502 | Q |
| 6 | James Hedgcock | Canada | 59.880 | +1.586 | Q |
| 7 | Nick Kergozou | New Zealand | 59.930 | +1.636 | Q |
| 8 | Alejandro Martínez | Spain | 59.938 | +1.644 | Q |
| 9 | Xue Chenxi | China | 1:00.143 | +1.849 | |
| 10 | Marc Jurczyk | Germany | 1:00.386 | +2.092 | |
| 11 | Robin Wagner | Czech Republic | 1:00.535 | +2.241 | |
| 12 | Cristian Ortega | Colombia | 1:00.595 | +2.301 | |
| 13 | Patryk Rajkowski | Poland | 1:00.598 | +2.304 | |
| 14 | Ryan Dodyk | Canada | 1:00.780 | +2.486 | |
| 15 | Quentin Lafargue | France | 1:00.969 | +2.675 | |
| 16 | Liu Qi | China | 1:01.060 | +2.766 | |
| 17 | Santiago Ramírez | Colombia | 1:01.061 | +2.767 | |
| 18 | Muhammad Fadhil Mohd Zonis | Malaysia | 1:01.211 | +2.917 | |
| 19 | Davide Boscaro | Italy | 1:01.276 | +2.982 | |
| 20 | Tomáš Bábek | Czech Republic | 1:01.603 | +3.309 | |
| 21 | Juan Ruiz | Mexico | 1:01.669 | +3.375 | |
| 22 | Andrey Chugay | Kazakhstan | 1:01.850 | +3.511 | |
| 23 | José Moreno | Spain | 1:02.054 | +3.760 | |
| 24 | David Elkathchoongo | India | 1:02.618 | +4.324 | |
| 25 | Jean Spies | South Africa | 1:02.747 | +4.453 | |

=== Final ===
The final was started at 20:00.

| Rank | Name | Nation | Time | Behind | Notes |
|---|---|---|---|---|---|
| 1st place, gold medalist(s) | Jeffrey Hoogland | Netherlands | 58.106 | | |
| 2nd place, silver medalist(s) | Melvin Landerneau | France | 59.568 | +1.462 | |
| 3rd place, bronze medalist(s) | Alejandro Martínez | Spain | 59.871 | +1.765 | |
| 4 | Maximilian Dörnbach | Germany | 59.984 | +1.878 | |
| 5 | Matteo Bianchi | Italy | 1:00.012 | +1.906 | |
| 6 | Yuta Obara | Japan | 1:00.175 | +2.069 | |
| 7 | Nick Kergozou | New Zealand | 1:00.340 | +2.234 | |
| 8 | James Hedgcock | Canada | 1:00.363 | +2.257 | |
