= List of Spanish records in track cycling =

The following are the national records in track cycling in Spain maintained by the Spanish Cycling Federation (Real Federacion Espanola de Ciclismo).

== Men ==
Key to tables: Awaiting ratification Record not kept by Spanish Cycling Federation Not ratified or later rescinded by Spanish Cycling Federation

| Event | Record | Athlete | Date | Meet | Place | Ref |
|---|---|---|---|---|---|---|
| Flying 200m time trial | 9.790 | Alejandro Martínez | 23 April 2023 | Nations Cup | Milton, Canada | |
| Flying 200m time trial | 9.736 | Esteban Sánchez | 3 February 2026 | European Championships | Konya, Turkey | |
| Flying 200m time trial | 9.633 | Juan Peralta | 19 January 2013 | World Cup | Aguascalientes, Mexico | |
| 250m time trial (standing start) | 17.729 | José Moreno Sánchez | 5 December 2013 | World Cup | Aguascalientes, Mexico | |
| Flying 500m time trial | 26.856 | José Manuel Moreno | 31 January 1991 | | Moscow, Russia | |
| Team sprint | 43.601 | José Moreno; Alejandro Martínez; Esteban Sánchez | 1 February 2026 | European Championships | Konya, Turkey | |
| 1km time trial | 59.501 | Alejandro Martínez | 9 February 2023 | European Championships | Grenchen, Switzerland | |
| 1km time trial (sea level) | 59.501 | Alejandro Martínez | 9 February 2023 | European Championships | Grenchen, Switzerland | |
| 4000m individual pursuit | 4:06.718 | Eñaut Urkaregi | 3 February 2026 | European Championships | Konya, Turkey | |
| 4000m team pursuit | 3:56.472 | Xavier Cañellas; Álvaro Navas; Beñat Garaiar; Eñaut Urkaregi | 22 October 2025 | World Championships | Santiago, Chile | |
| 4000m team pursuit | 3:51.299 | Joan Martí Bennassar; Álvaro Navas; Beñat Garaiar; Eñaut Urkaregi | 2 February 2026 | European Championships | Konya, Turkey | |
| Hour record (UCI best human effort) | 53.040 km | Miguel Indurain | 2 September 1994 | | Bordeaux, France | |

== Women ==
| Event | Record | Athlete | Date | Meet | Place | Ref |
|---|---|---|---|---|---|---|
| Flying 200m time trial | 10.863 | Helena Casas | 15 March 2025 | Nations Cup | Konya, Turkery | |
| Flying 200m time trial | 10.845 | Helena Casas | 2 February 2026 | European Championships | Konya, Turkey | |
| Flying 200m time trial | 10.806 | Tania Calvo | 7 December 2013 | World Cup | Aguascalientes, Mexico | |
| 250m time trial (standing start) | 18.857 | Tania Calvo | 17 February 2017 | World Cup | Cali, Colombia | |
| Flying 500m time trial | 34.103 | Ainhoa Ostolaza Etxaniz | 31 January 1991 | | Moscow, Russia | |
| 500m time trial | 34.614 | Tania Calvo | 8 April 2012 | World Championships | Melbourne, Australia | |
| 500m time trial | 33.625 | Tania Calvo | 6 December 2013 | World Cup | Aguascalientes, Mexico | |
| 500m time trial (sea level) | 33.924 | Tania Calvo | 3 March 2018 | World Championships | Apeldoorn, Netherlands | |
| 1 km time trial | 1:07.299 | Helena Casas | 4 February 2026 | European Championship | Konya, Turkey | |
| Team sprint (500 m) | 33.136 | Tania Calvo; Helena Casas | 17 February 2017 | World Cup | Cali, Colombia | |
| 3000m individual pursuit | 3:30.425 | Isabella Escalera | 19 October 2024 | World Championships | Ballerup, Denmark | |
| 4000m individual pursuit | 4:46.382 | Isabella Escalera | 15 February 2025 | European Championships | Heusden-Zolder, Belgium | |
| 3000m team pursuit | 3:32.159 | Débora Gálvez; Leire Olaberria; Gloria Rodríguez | 18 February 2011 | World Cup | Manchester, United Kingdom | |
| 4000m team pursuit | 4:26.621 | Tania Calvo; Isabel Ferreres; Eukene Larrarte; Laura Rodríguez | 9 February 2023 | European Championships | Grenchen, Switzerland | |
| Hour record (UCI best human effort) | 44.158 km | Dori Ruano | 12 October 1996 | | Anoeta, Spain | |
