= 2023 UEC European Track Championships – Men's 1 km time trial =

Men's 1 km time trial at the 2023 UEC European Track Championships
- Venue: Tissot Velodrome, Grenchen
- Date: 9 February
- Competitors: 19 from 14 nations
- Winning time: 58.203

Medalists
gold medal	Jeffrey Hoogland	Netherlands
silver medal	Alejandro Martínez	Spain
bronze medal	Maximilian Dörnbach	Germany

The men's 1 km time trial competition at the 2023 UEC European Track Championships was held on 9 February 2023.

== Results ==
=== Qualifying ===
The top 8 riders qualified for the final.

Rank	Name	Nation	Time	Behind	Notes
1	Jeffrey Hoogland	Netherlands	57.813		Q
2	Alejandro Martínez	Spain	59.501	+1.688	Q
3	Joseph Truman	Great Britain	59.564	+1.751	Q
4	Maximilian Dörnbach	Germany	59.671	+1.858	Q
5	Melvin Landerneau	France	1:00.061	+2.248	Q
6	Matteo Bianchi	Italy	1:00.220	+2.407	Q
7	Patryk Rajkowski	Poland	1:00.983	+3.170	Q
8	Marc Jurczyk	Germany	1:01.094	+3.281	Q
9	Ekain Jiménez	Spain	1:01.594	+3.781	
10	Matěj Hytych	Czech Republic	1:01.863	+4.050	
11	Robin Wagner	Czech Republic	1:01.864	+4.051	
12	Stefano Moro	Italy	1:01.975	+4.162	
13	Justas Beniušis	Lithuania	1:02.220	+4.407	NR
14	Laurynas Vinskas	Lithuania	1:03.500	+5.687	
15	Stamatios Savvakis	Greece	1:03.862	+6.049	
16	Bálint Csengői	Hungary	1:04.619	+6.806	
17	Rodrigo Caixas	Portugal	1:05.117	+7.304	
18	Mykhailo-Yaroslav Dudko	Ukraine	1:05.266	+7.453	
19	Eduard Žalar	Slovenia	1:05.859	+8.046	

=== Final ===
Rank	Name	Nation	Time	Behind	Notes
1st place, gold medalist(s)	Jeffrey Hoogland	Netherlands	58.203		
2nd place, silver medalist(s)	Alejandro Martínez	Spain	59.687	+1.484	
3rd place, bronze medalist(s)	Maximilian Dörnbach	Germany	59.778	+1.575	
4	Joseph Truman	Great Britain	1:00.291	+2.088	
5	Matteo Bianchi	Italy	1:00.483	+2.280	
6	Melvin Landerneau	France	1:00.575	+2.372	
7	Patryk Rajkowski	Poland	1:01.519	+3.316	
8	Marc Jurczyk	Germany	1:01.952	+3.749	
