= 2022 UEC European Track Championships – Men's keirin =

Cycling competition

Men's keirin at the 2022 UEC European Track Championships
- Venue: Messe München, Munich
- Date: 16 August
- Competitors: 20 from 11 nations

Medalists
gold medal	Sébastien Vigier	France
silver medal	Maximilian Dörnbach	Germany
bronze medal	Melvin Landerneau	France

The men's keirin competition at the 2022 UEC European Track Championships was held on 16 August 2022.

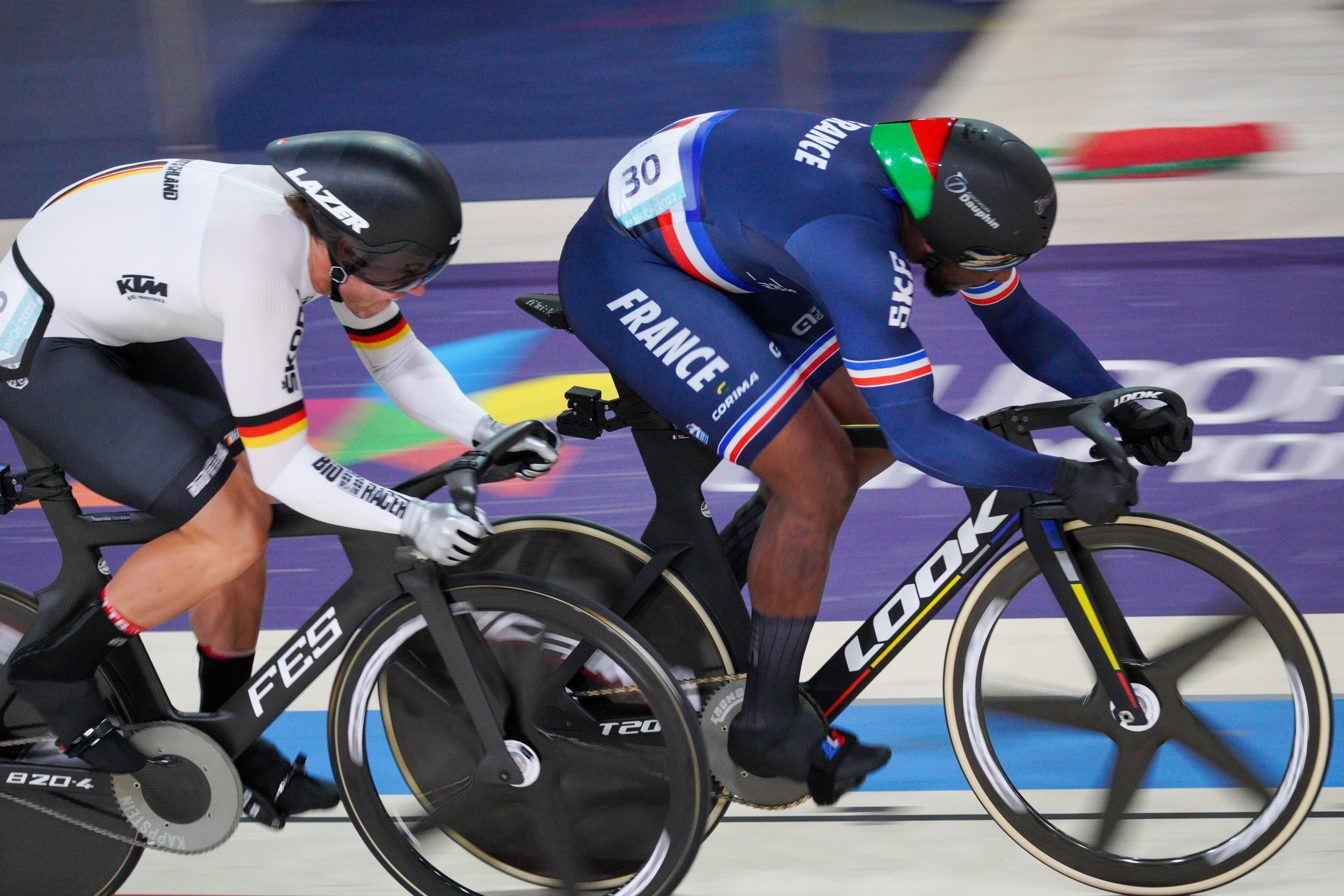
UEC Track Elite European Championships

== Results ==
=== First round ===
The first rider in each heat qualified to the second round, all other riders advanced to the first round repechages.

Heat 1

Rank	Name	Nation	Notes
1	Vladyslav Denysenko	Ukraine	Q
2	Matteo Bianchi	Italy	
3	Vasilijus Lendel	Lithuania	
4	José Moreno Sánchez	Spain	
5	Bálint Csengői	Hungary	DNF

Heat 2

Rank	Name	Nation	Notes
1	Sébastien Vigier	France	Q
2	Svajūnas Jonauskas	Lithuania	
3	Daniele Napolitano	Italy	
4	Matěj Bohuslávek	Czech Republic	
5	Alejandro Martínez	Spain	

Heat 3

Rank	Name	Nation	Notes
1	Marc Jurczyk	Germany	Q
2	Sándor Szalontay	Hungary	
3	Rafal Sarnecki	Poland	
4	Tijmen van Loon	Netherlands	
5	Hamish Turnbull	Great Britain	

Heat 4

Rank	Name	Nation	Notes
1	Maximilian Dörnbach	Germany	Q
2	Melvin Landerneau	France	
3	Tomáš Bábek	Czech Republic	
4	Patryk Rajkowski	Poland	
5	Mykhailo-Yaroslav Dudko	Ukraine	

=== Repechage ===
The first two riders in each heat qualify to the second round.

Heat 1

Rank	Name	Nation	Notes
1	Tomáš Bábek	Czech Republic	Q
2	Alejandro Martínez	Spain	Q
3	Matteo Bianchi	Italy	
4	Tijmen van Loon	Netherlands	

Heat 2

Rank	Name	Nation	Notes
1	Rafal Sarnecki	Poland	Q
2	Svajūnas Jonauskas	Lithuania	Q
3	Matěj Bohuslávek	Czech Republic	
4	Bálint Csengői	Hungary	

Heat 3

Rank	Name	Nation	Notes
1	Sándor Szalontay	Hungary	Q
2	Daniele Napolitano	Italy	Q
3	José Moreno Sánchez	Spain	
4	Mykhailo-Yaroslav Dudko	Ukraine	

Heat 4

Rank	Name	Nation	Notes
1	Melvin Landerneau	France	Q
2	Hamish Turnbull	Great Britain	Q
3	Patryk Rajkowski	Poland	
4	Vasilijus Lendel	Lithuania	

=== Second round ===
The first three riders in each heat qualify to final 1–6, all other riders advance to final 7–12.

Heat 1

Rank	Name	Nation	Notes
1	Maximilian Dörnbach	Germany	Q
2	Vladyslav Denysenko	Ukraine	Q
3	Melvin Landerneau	France	Q
4	Svajūnas Jonauskas	Lithuania	
5	Tomáš Bábek	Czech Republic	
6	Daniele Napolitano	Italy	

Heat 2

Rank	Name	Nation	Notes
1	Marc Jurczyk	Germany	Q
2	Rafal Sarnecki	Poland	Q
3	Sébastien Vigier	France	Q
4	Alejandro Martínez	Spain	
5	Hamish Turnbull	Great Britain	
6	Sándor Szalontay	Hungary	

=== Finals ===
Small final

Rank	Name	Nation	Notes
7	Tomáš Bábek	Czech Republic	
8	Hamish Turnbull	Great Britain	
9	Svajūnas Jonauskas	Lithuania	
10	Alejandro Martínez	Spain	
11	Sándor Szalontay	Hungary	
12	Daniele Napolitano	Italy	

Final

Rank	Name	Nation	Notes
1st place, gold medalist(s)	Sébastien Vigier	France	
2nd place, silver medalist(s)	Maximilian Dörnbach	Germany	
3rd place, bronze medalist(s)	Melvin Landerneau	France	
4	Vladyslav Denysenko	Ukraine	
5	Rafal Sarnecki	Poland	
6	Marc Jurczyk	Germany	
