= 2022 UEC European Track Championships – Men's 1 km time trial =

Men's 1 km time trial at the 2022 UEC European Track Championships
- Venue: Messe München, Munich
- Date: 15 August
- Competitors: 20 from 12 nations
- Winning time: 59.975

Medalists
gold medal	Melvin Landerneau	France
silver medal	Matteo Bianchi	Italy
bronze medal	Maximilian Dörnbach	Germany

The men's 1 km time trial competition at the 2022 UEC European Track Championships was held on 15 August 2022.

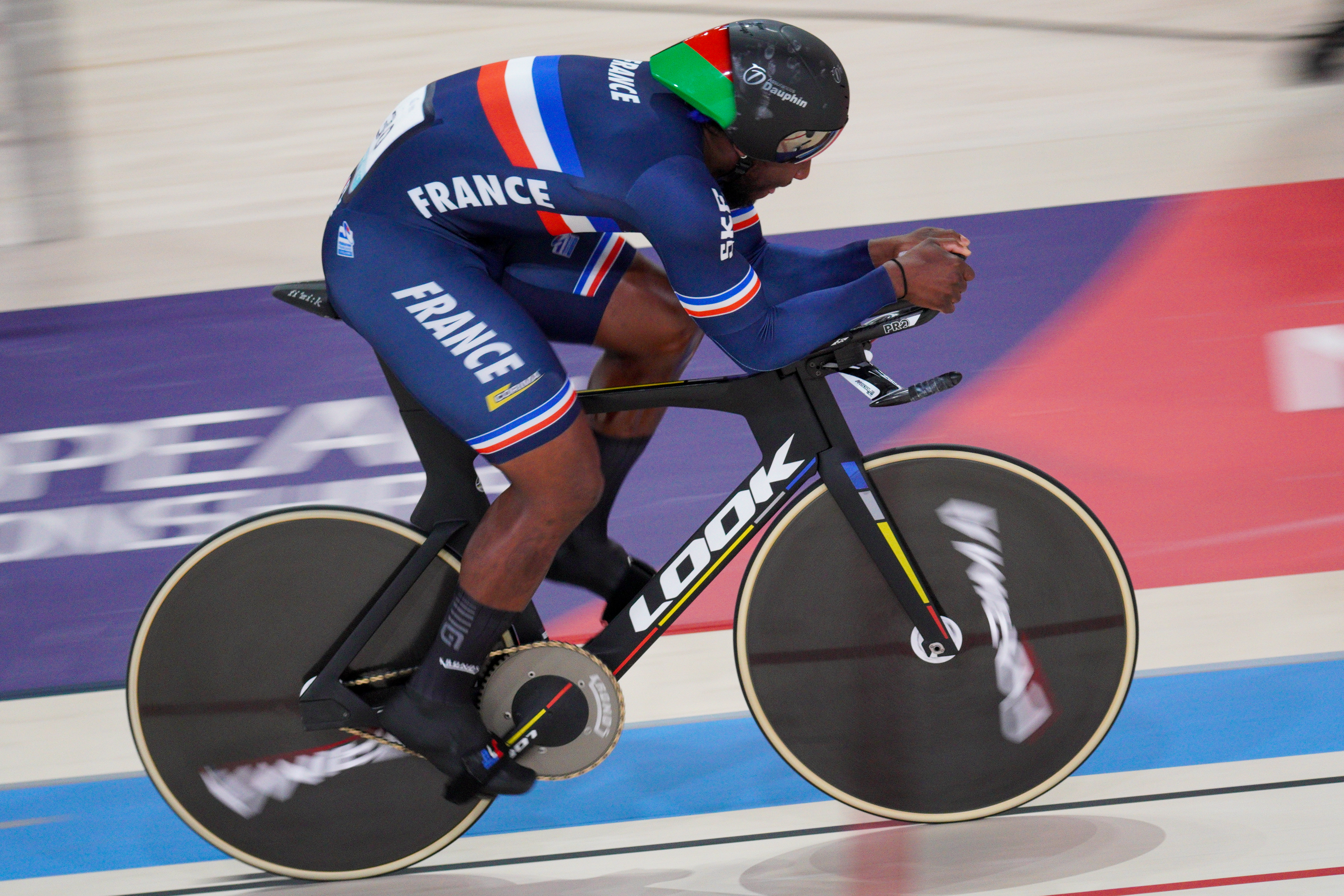
UEC Track Elite European Championships

== Results ==
=== Qualifying ===
The top 8 riders qualified for the final.

Rank	Name	Nation	Time	Behind	Notes
1	Melvin Landerneau	France	59.653		Q
2	Matteo Bianchi	Italy	59.661	+0.008	Q
3	Maximilian Dörnbach	Germany	59.918	+0.265	Q
4	Rasmus Pedersen	Denmark	1:00.234	+0.581	Q
5	Quentin Lafargue	France	1:00.550	+0.897	Q
6	Marc Jurczyk	Germany	1:00.590	+0.937	Q
7	Alejandro Martínez	Spain	1:00.908	+1.255	Q
8	Patryk Rajkowski	Poland	1:01.058	+1.405	Q
9	Davide Boscaro	Italy	1:01.092	+1.439	
10	Sándor Szalontay	Hungary	1:01.427	+1.774	
11	Robin Wagner	Czech Republic	1:01.538	+1.885	
12	Kian Emadi	Great Britain	1:01.910	+2.257	
13	Tomáš Bábek	Czech Republic	1:02.127	+2.474	
14	Justas Beniušis	Lithuania	1:02.905	+3.252	
15	Ekain Jiménez	Spain	1:02.928	+3.275	
16	Maxwell De Broeder	Belgium	1:03.533	+3.880	
17	Arthur Senrame	Belgium	1:04.072	+4.419	
18	Bálint Csengői	Hungary	1:04.326	+4.673	
19	Kacper Majewski	Poland	1:05.418	+5.765	
20	Eduard Žalar	Slovenia	1:08.313	+8.660	

=== Final ===
Rank	Name	Nation	Time	Behind	Notes
1st place, gold medalist(s)	Melvin Landerneau	France	59.975		
2nd place, silver medalist(s)	Matteo Bianchi	Italy	1:00.089	+0.114	
3rd place, bronze medalist(s)	Maximilian Dörnbach	Germany	1:00.225	+0.250	
4	Alejandro Martínez	Spain	1:00.752	+0.777	
5	Rasmus Pedersen	Denmark	1:00.862	+0.887	
6	Marc Jurczyk	Germany	1:00.879	+0.904	
7	Quentin Lafargue	France	1:01.030	+1.055	
8	Patryk Rajkowski	Poland	1:01.493	+1.518	
