= 2022 UEC European Track Championships – Women's 500 m time trial =

Cycling competition

Women's 500 m time trial at the 2022 UEC European Track Championships
- Venue: Messe München, Munich
- Date: 13 August
- Competitors: 16 from 11 nations
- Winning time: 32.668

Medalists
gold medal	Emma Hinze	Germany
silver medal	Olena Starikova	Ukraine
bronze medal	Miriam Vece	Italy

The women's 500 m time trial competition at the 2022 UEC European Track Championships was held on 13 August 2022.

== Results ==
=== Qualifying ===
The top 8 riders qualified for the final.

Rank	Heat	Name	Nation	Time	Behind	Notes
1	1	Emma Hinze	Germany	32.732		Q
2	1	Olena Starikova	Ukraine	33.497	+0.765	Q
3	7	Miriam Vece	Italy	33.528	+0.796	Q
4	8	Pauline Grabosch	Germany	33.544	+0.812	Q
5	8	Steffie van der Peet	Netherlands	33.613	+0.881	Q
6	5	Urszula Łoś	Poland	33.732	+1.000	Q
7	4	Taky Marie-Divine Kouamé	France	33.802	+1.070	Q
8	6	Kyra Lamberink	Netherlands	33.992	+1.260	Q
9	4	Lauren Bell	Great Britain	34.112	+1.380	
10	6	Marlena Karwacka	Poland	34.159	+1.427	
11	7	Veronika Jaborníková	Czech Republic	34.668	+1.936	
12	2	Oleksandra Lohviniuk	Ukraine	34.803	+2.071	
13	3	Julie Michaux	France	34.854	+2.122	
14	3	Orla Walsh	Ireland	35.176	+2.444	
15	5	Helena Casas	Spain	35.224	+2.492	
16	2	Elena Bissolati	Italy	36.175	+3.443	

=== Final ===
Rank	Name	Nation	Time	Behind	Notes
1st place, gold medalist(s)	Emma Hinze	Germany	32.668		
2nd place, silver medalist(s)	Olena Starikova	Ukraine	33.403	+0.735	
3rd place, bronze medalist(s)	Miriam Vece	Italy	33.434	+0.766	
4	Steffie van der Peet	Netherlands	33.673	+1.005	
5	Pauline Grabosch	Germany	33.684	+1.016	
6	Urszula Łoś	Poland	33.685	+1.017	
7	Kyra Lamberink	Netherlands	34.042	+1.374	
	Taky Marie-Divine Kouamé	France	Did not finish		
