= 2022 UEC European Track Championships – Men's points race =

Men's points race at the 2022 UEC European Track Championships
- Venue: Messe München, Munich
- Date: 12 August
- Competitors: 20 from 20 nations
- Winning points: 135

Medalists
gold medal	Benjamin Thomas	France
silver medal	Robbe Ghys	Belgium
bronze medal	Vincent Hoppezak	Netherlands

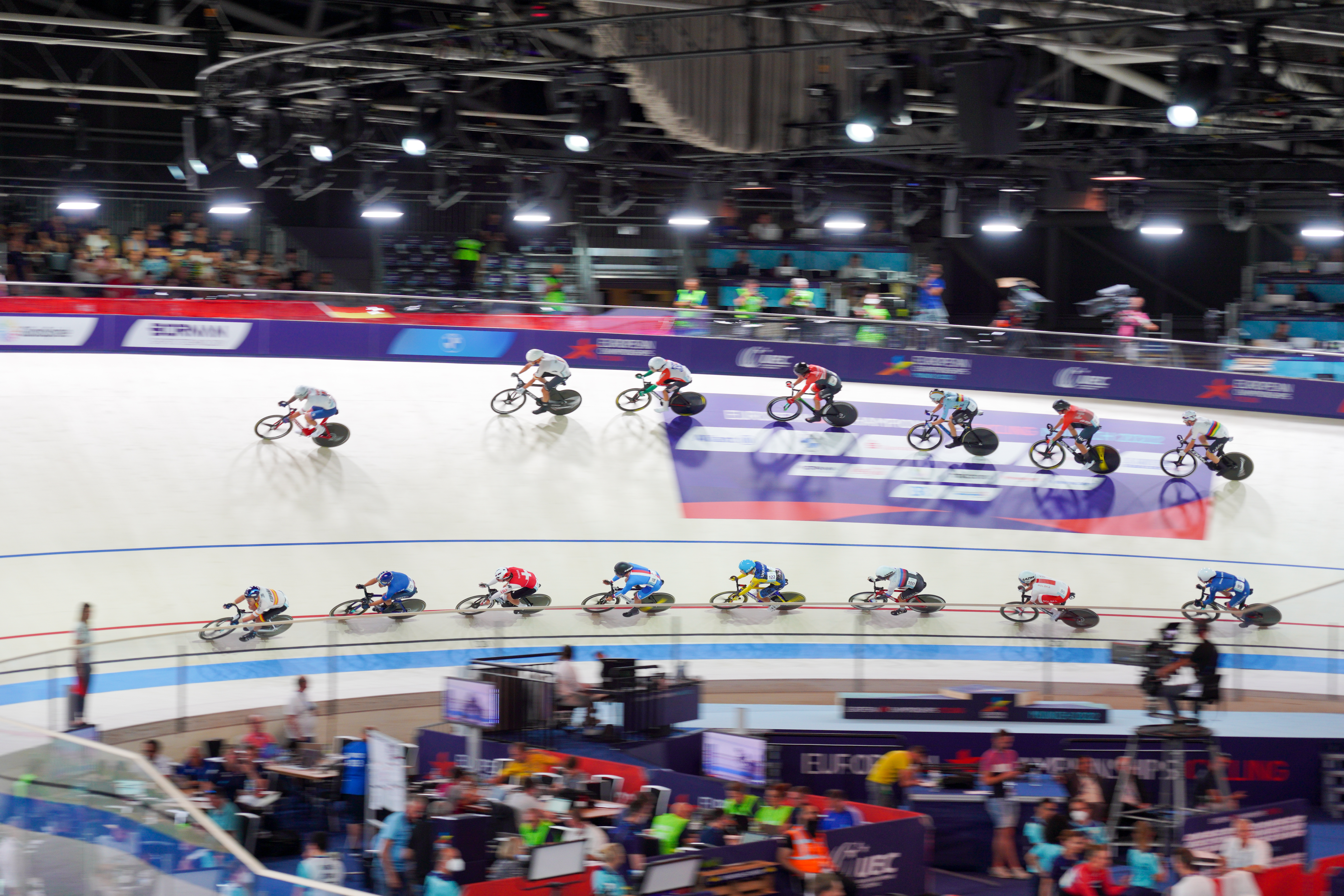
UEC Track Elite European Championships

The men's points race competition at the 2022 UEC European Track Championships was held on 12 August 2022.

== Results ==
200 laps (40 km) were raced with 20 sprints.

Rank	Name	Nation	Lap points	Sprint points	Finish order	Total points
1st place, gold medalist(s)	Benjamin Thomas	France	80	55	1	135
2nd place, silver medalist(s)	Robbe Ghys	Belgium	80	43	6	123
3rd place, bronze medalist(s)	Vincent Hoppezak	Netherlands	100	13	13	113
4	Roger Kluge	Germany	80	24	17	104
5	Matteo Donegà	Italy	80	12	8	92
6	Diogo Narciso	Portugal	80	9	7	89
7	Albert Torres	Spain	40	18	2	58
8	Mykyta Yakovlev	Ukraine	40	12	10	52
9	Jan Voneš	Czech Republic	40	11	3	51
10	Gustav Johansson	Sweden	40	4	12	44
11	Bertold Drijver	Hungary	20	0	9	20
12	Wojciech Pszczolarski	Poland	0	11	15	11
13	Vladislav Logionov	Israel	–20	5	4	–15
14	Daniel Crista	Romania	–20	5	5	–15
15	Maximilian Schmidbauer	Austria	–20	3	11	–17
16	Stepan Grigoryan	Armenia	–20	1	18	–19
17	Martin Chren	Slovakia	–20	0	14	–20
18	William Tidball	Great Britain	–60	0	16	–60
	Dominik Bieler	Switzerland	0	0	–	DNF
	Vitālijs Korņilovs	Latvia	–40	0	–	DNF
