= 2022 UEC European Track Championships – Men's madison =

Men's madison at the 2022 UEC European Track Championships
- Venue: Messe München, Munich
- Date: 16 August
- Competitors: 30 from 15 nations
- Teams: 15
- Winning points: 101

Medalists
gold medal	Roger Kluge; Theo Reinhardt	Germany
silver medal	Thomas Boudat; Donavan Grondin	France
bronze medal	Robbe Ghys; Fabio Van Den Bossche	Belgium

The men's madison competition at the 2022 UEC European Track Championships was held on 16 August 2022.

== Results ==
250 laps (50 km) with 25 sprints were raced.

Rank	Name	Nation	Lap points	Sprint points	Finish order	Total points
1st place, gold medalist(s)	Roger Kluge; Theo Reinhardt	Germany	20	81	4	101
2nd place, silver medalist(s)	Thomas Boudat; Donavan Grondin	France	20	71	1	91
3rd place, bronze medalist(s)	Robbe Ghys; Fabio Van den Bossche	Belgium	20	38	6	58
4	Diogo Narciso; Iúri Leitão	Portugal	20	23	3	43
5	Sebastian Mora; Albert Torres	Spain	0	28	2	28
6	Elia Viviani; Michele Scartezzini	Italy	0	10	5	10
7	Yoeri Havik; Jan Willem van Schip	Netherlands	–20	23	8	3
8	Tobias Hansen; Robin Juel Skivild	Denmark	–20	5	7	–15
9	Wojciech Pszczolarski; Bartosz Rudyk	Poland	–40	0	9	–40
	Rhys Britton; William Tidball	Great Britain	–20	4	–	DNF
	Daniel Babor; Denis Rugovac	Czech Republic	–40	3	–	DNF
	Valère Thiébaud; Claudio Imhof	Switzerland	–60	0	–	DNF
	Roman Gladysh; Maksym Vasyliev	Ukraine	–40	0	–	DNF
	Tim Wafler; Felix Ritzinger	Austria	–40	0	–	DNF
	Rotem Tene; Vladislav Logionov	Israel	–40	0	–	DNF
