= Melvin Landerneau =

French cyclist

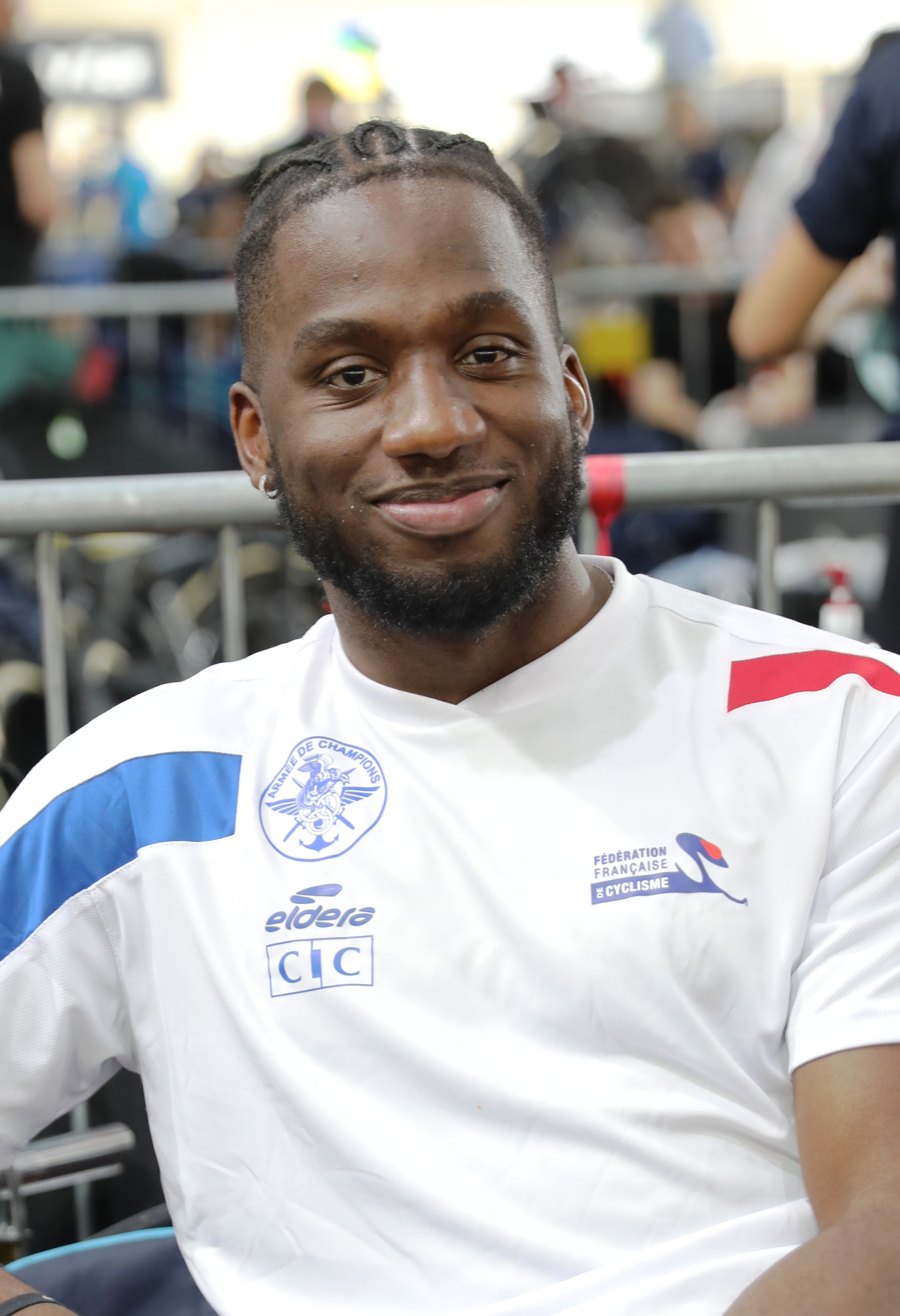
- Landerneau in 2024

Personal information
- Born: 29 September 1997 (age 29)

Cycling career
- Sport: Cycling
- Role: Rider
Medal record
Men's track cycling
Representing France
World Championships
Silver medal – second place	2022 Saint-Quentin-en-Yvelines	1 km time trial
European Championships
Gold medal – first place	2022 Munich	1 km time trial
Silver medal – second place	2022 Munich	Team sprint
Bronze medal – third place	2019 Apeldoorn	Team sprint
Bronze medal – third place	2022 Munich	Keirin
Bronze medal – third place	2023 Grenchen	Team sprint
Bronze medal – third place	2024 Apeldoorn	1 km time trial

Melvin Landerneau (born 29 September 1997) is a French racing cyclist. He rode in the men's sprint event at the 2018 UCI Track Cycling World Championships.
