= 2022 UEC European Track Championships – Women's sprint =

Women's team sprint at the 2022 UEC European Track Championships
- Venue: Messe München, Munich
- Date: 14–15 August
- Competitors: 18 from 11 nations

Medalists
gold medal	Emma Hinze	Germany
silver medal	Mathilde Gros	France
bronze medal	Laurine van Riessen	Netherlands

The women's sprint competition at the 2022 UEC European Track Championships was held on 14 and 15 August 2022.

== Results ==
=== Qualifying ===
The top 14 riders qualified for the 1/8 finals, 15th to 18th places qualified for the 1/16 finals.

Rank	Name	Nation	Time	Notes
1	Mathilde Gros	France	10.326	Q
2	Emma Hinze	Germany	10.372	Q
3	Laurine van Riessen	Netherlands	10.452	Q
4	Lea Friedrich	Germany	10.543	Q
5	Olena Starikova	Ukraine	10.587	Q
6	Hetty van de Wouw	Netherlands	10.593	Q
7	Sophie Capewell	Great Britain	10.697	Q
8	Urszula Łoś	Poland	10.749	Q
9	Taky Marie-Divine Kouamé	France	10.753	Q
10	Nicky Degrendele	Belgium	10.779	Q
11	Miriam Vece	Italy	10.825	Q
12	Oleksandra Lohviniuk	Ukraine	10.880	Q
13	Orla Walsh	Ireland	10.900	Q
14	Lauren Bell	Great Britain	10.933	Q
15	Veronika Jaborníková	Czech Republic	10.994	q
16	Nikola Sibiak	Poland	11.004	q
17	Helena Casas	Spain	11.420	q
18	Elena Bissolati	Italy	11.500	q

=== 1/16 finals ===
Heat winners advanced to the 1/8 finals.

Heat	Rank	Name	Nation	Time	Notes
1	1	Veronika Jaborníková	Czech Republic	X	Q
1	2	Elena Bissolati	Italy		
2	1	Nikola Sibiak	Poland	X	Q
2	2	Helena Casas	Spain		

=== 1/8 finals ===
Heat winners advanced to the quarterfinals.

Heat	Rank	Name	Nation	Time	Notes
1	1	Mathilde Gros	France	X	Q
1	2	Nikola Sibiak	Poland		
2	1	Emma Hinze	Germany	X	Q
2	2	Veronika Jaborníková	Czech Republic		
3	1	Laurine van Riessen	Netherlands	X	Q
3	2	Lauren Bell	Great Britain		
4	1	Lea Friedrich	Germany	X	Q
4	2	Orla Walsh	Ireland		
5	1	Oleksandra Lohviniuk	Ukraine	X	Q
5	2	Olena Starikova	Ukraine		
6	1	Hetty van de Wouw	Netherlands	X	Q
6	2	Miriam Vece	Italy		
7	1	Sophie Capewell	Great Britain	X	Q
7	2	Nicky Degrendele	Belgium		
8	1	Taky Marie-Divine Kouamé	France	X	Q
8	2	Urszula Łoś	Poland		

=== Quarterfinals ===
Matches are extended to a best-of-three format hereon; winners proceed to the semifinals.

Heat	Rank	Name	Nation	Race 1	Race 2	Decider (i.r.)	Notes
1	1	Mathilde Gros	France	X	X		Q
1	2	Taky Marie-Divine Kouamé	France				
2	1	Emma Hinze	Germany	X	X		Q
2	2	Sophie Capewell	Great Britain				
3	1	Laurine van Riessen	Netherlands	X	X		Q
3	2	Hetty van de Wouw	Netherlands				
4	1	Lea Friedrich	Germany	X	X		Q
4	2	Oleksandra Lohviniuk	Ukraine				

=== Semifinals ===
Winners proceed to the gold medal final; losers proceed to the bronze medal final.

Heat	Rank	Name	Nation	Race 1	Race 2	Decider (i.r.)	Notes
1	1	Mathilde Gros	France	X	X		QG
1	2	Lea Friedrich	Germany				QB
2	1	Emma Hinze	Germany	X	X		QG
2	2	Laurine van Riessen	Netherlands				QB

=== Finals ===
Rank	Name	Nation	Race 1	Race 2	Decider (i.r.)
Gold medal final
1st place, gold medalist(s)	Emma Hinze	Germany	X		X
2nd place, silver medalist(s)	Mathilde Gros	France		X	
Bronze medal final
3rd place, bronze medalist(s)	Laurine van Riessen	Netherlands	X	X	
4	Lea Friedrich	Germany			
