= 2022 UEC European Track Championships – Women's individual pursuit =

Women's individual pursuit at the 2022 UEC European Track Championships
- Venue: Messe München, Munich
- Date: 13 August
- Competitors: 19 from 11 nations
- Winning time: 3:19.548

Medalists
gold medal	Mieke Kröger	Germany
silver medal	Lisa Brennauer	Germany
bronze medal	Vittoria Guazzini	Italy

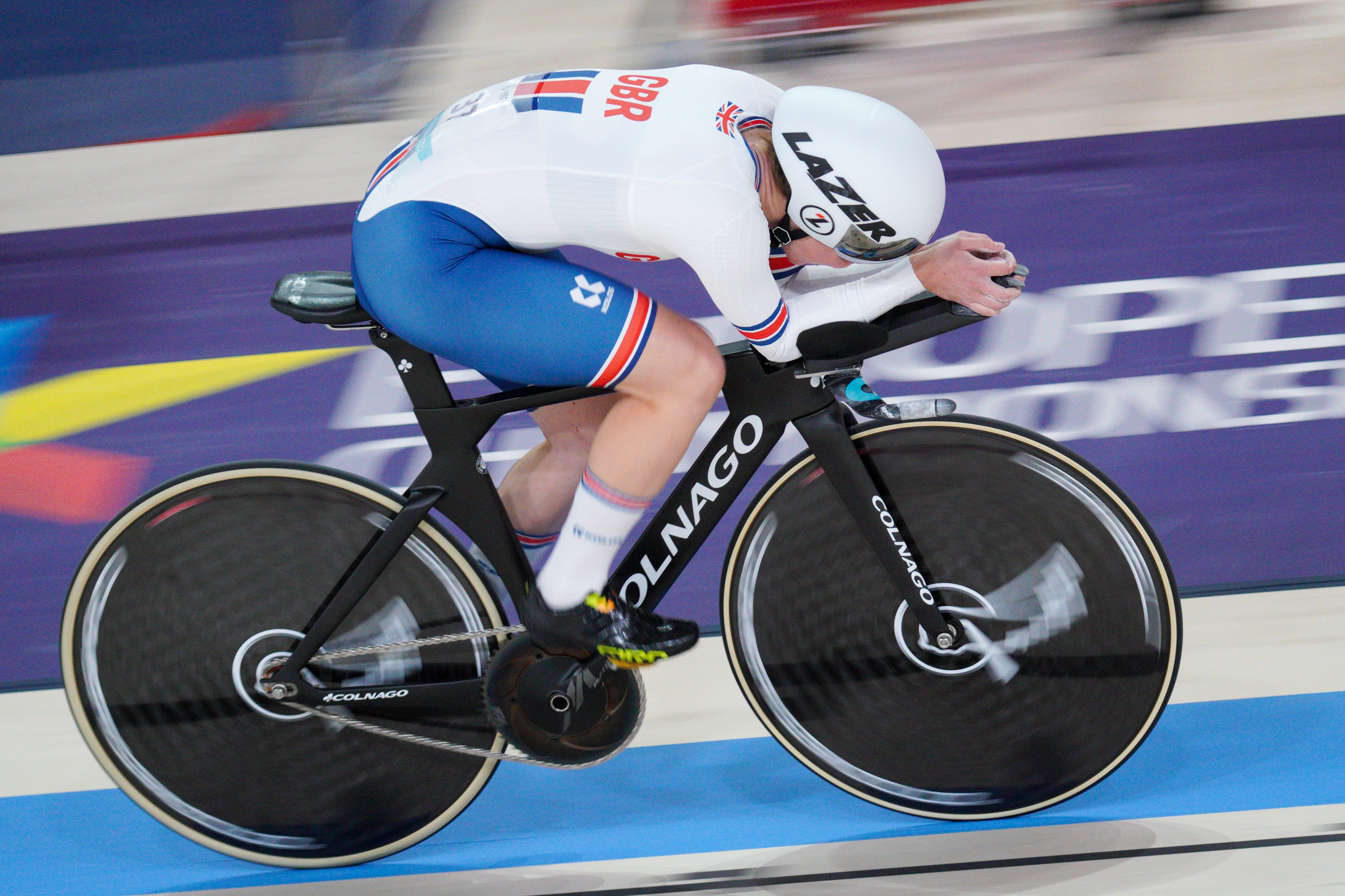
UEC Track Elite European Championships

The women's individual pursuit competition at the 2022 UEC European Track Championships was held on 13 August 2022.

== Results ==
=== Qualifying ===
The first two racers raced for gold, the third and fourth fastest rider raced for the bronze medal.

Rank	Name	Nation	Time	Behind	Notes
1	Lisa Brennauer	Germany	3:21.138		QG
2	Mieke Kröger	Germany	3:23.569	+2.431	QG
3	Vittoria Guazzini	Italy	3:24.503	+3.365	QB
4	Josie Knight	Great Britain	3:25.231	+4.093	QB
5	Anna Morris	Great Britain	3:26.307	+5.169	
6	Kelly Murphy	Ireland	3:26.362	+5.224	
7	Marion Borras	France	3:27.579	+6.441	
8	Daniek Hengeveld	Netherlands	3:28.233	+7.095	
9	Silvia Zanardi	Italy	3:28.500	+7.362	
10	Jade Labastugue	France	3:31.649	+10.511	
11	Marith Vanhove	Belgium	3:35.819	+14.681	
12	Fabienne Buri	Switzerland	3:36.635	+15.497	
13	Katrijn De Clercq	Belgium	3:38.700	+17.562	
14	Olga Wankiewicz	Poland	3:40.432	+19.294	
15	Ziortza Isasi	Spain	3:40.473	+19.335	
16	Viktoriia Yaroshenko	Ukraine	3:42.170	+21.032	
17	Tamara Szalińska	Poland	3:42.313	+21.175	
18	Jasmin Liechti	Switzerland	3:43.075	+21.937	
19	Tania Calvo	Spain	3:45.638	+24.500	

=== Finals ===
Rank	Name	Nation	Time	Behind	Notes
Gold medal final
1st place, gold medalist(s)	Mieke Kröger	Germany	3:22.469		
2nd place, silver medalist(s)	Lisa Brennauer	Germany	3:23.566	+1.097	
Bronze medal final
3rd place, bronze medalist(s)	Vittoria Guazzini	Italy	3:24.813		
4	Josie Knight	Great Britain	3:27.523	+2.710	
