= Alejandro Martínez (cyclist) =

Spanish cyclist (born 1998)

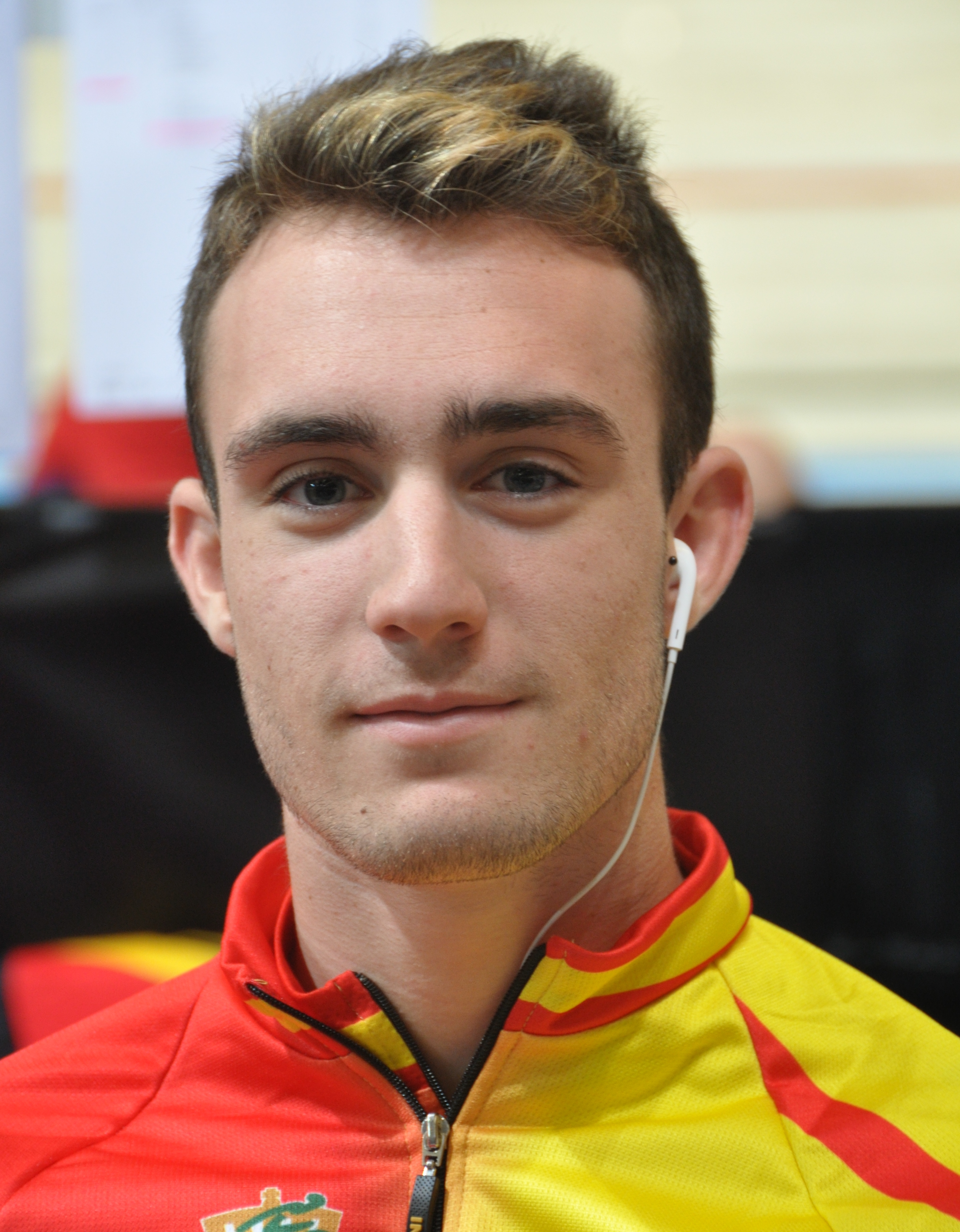
- Martínez in 2017

Personal information
- Full name: Alejandro Martínez Chorro
- Born: 28 May 1998 (age 28) Sant Vicent del Raspeig, Spain

Cycling career
- Sport: Cycling
- Discipline: Track
- Role: Rider
- Rider type: Sprinter
Medal record
Men's track cycling
Representing Spain
World Championships
| Bronze medal – third place | 2022 Saint-Quentin-en-Yvelines | 1 km time trial |
European Championships
| Silver medal – second place | 2023 Grenchen | 1 km time trial |

Alejandro Martínez Chorro (born 28 May 1998) is a Spanish track cyclist, who competes in sprinting events. He won the bronze medal in the 1 km time trial at the 2022 UCI Track Cycling World Championships. He simultaneously set the Spanish record in the event in a time of 59.871 seconds, making him the first Spanish rider to break 1 minute.
