= Maximilian Dörnbach =

German cyclist (born 1995)

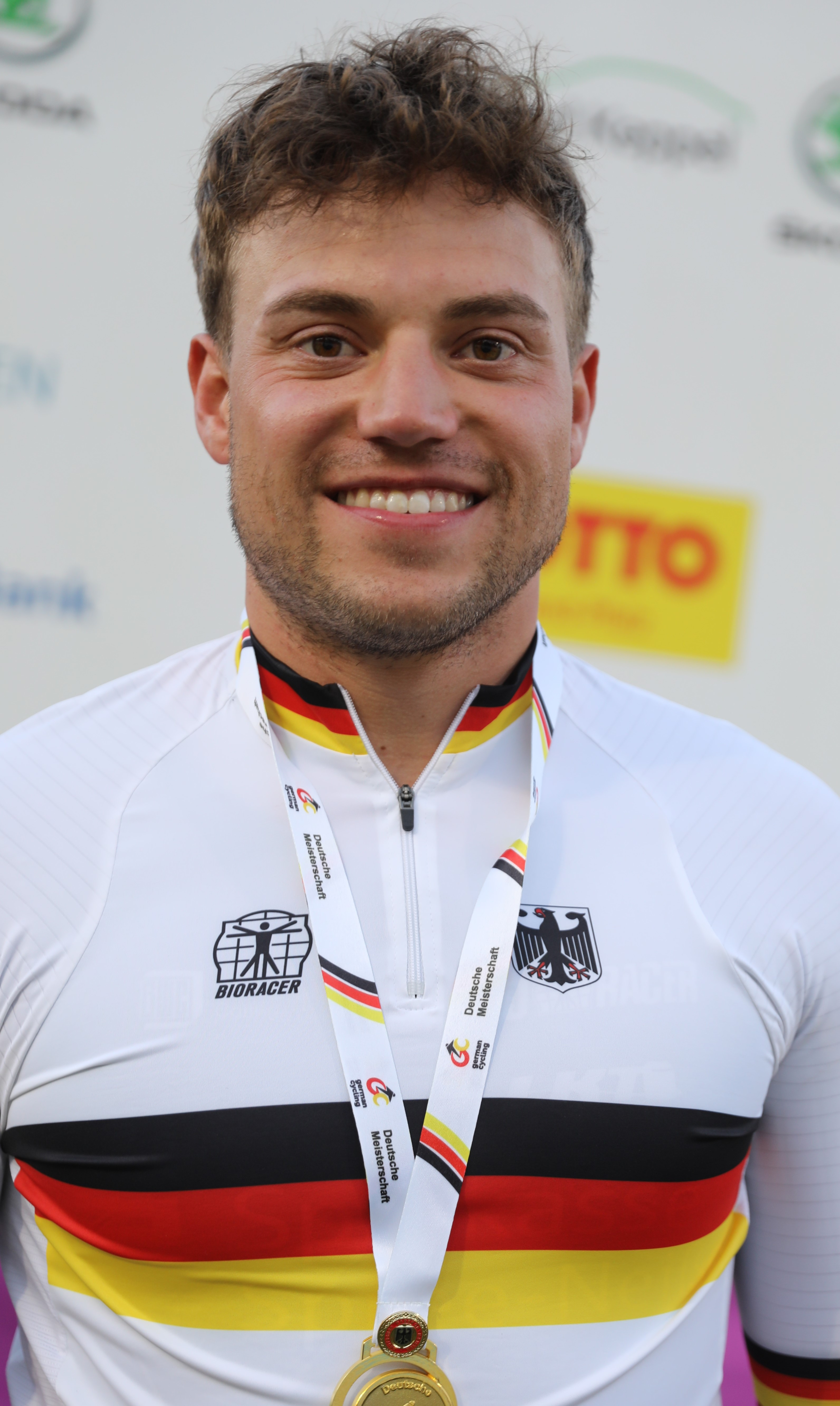
- Dörnbach in 2025

Personal information
- Born: 24 December 1995 (age 30) Heilbad Heiligenstadt, Germany

Cycling career
- Sport: Cycling
- Current team: Team Erdgas.2012
- Discipline: Track
- Role: Rider
- Rider type: Sprinter

Amateur team
- 2005−2014: RSV Pfeil Wingerode

Professional team
- 2017−: Team Erdgas.2012
Medal record
Men's track cycling
Representing Germany
World Championships
Silver medal – second place	2026 Shanghai	Keirin
European Championships
Silver medal – second place	2022 Munich	Keirin
Silver medal – second place	2025 Heusden-Zolder	1 km time trial
Silver medal – second place	2025 Heusden-Zolder	Keirin
Bronze medal – third place	2022 Munich	1 km time trial
Bronze medal – third place	2023 Grenchen	1 km time trial

Maximilian Dörnbach (born 24 December 1995) is a German track cyclist.

== Major results ==
2011
1st Individual sprint, Junior National Track Championships
2012
1st Team sprint, Junior European Track Championships
Junior National Track Championships

1st Kilometer
1st Team sprint (with Richard Assmus and Nikolai Hoffmeister)
1st Keirin
1st Individual sprint

2013
Junior World Track Championships

1st Kilometer
3rd Team sprint

Junior European Track Championships

1st Team sprint
1st Individual sprint
2nd Kilometer

2015
Under-23 European Track Championships

1st Team sprint
1st Kilometer

National Track Championships

1st Kilometer
2nd Team sprint
2nd Keirin

2016
Under-23 European Track Championships

1st Kilometer
3rd Team sprint

2017
National Track Championships

1st Kilometer
1st Team sprint (with Erik Balzer and Maximilian Levy)
3rd Keirin

World Cup

1st Team sprint, Cali (with Robert Förstemann, Max Niederlag and Eric Engler)
2nd Kilometer, Cali
