= Germany at the 2018 European Championships =

- WA code: GER

in (United Kingdom) Glasgow (Germany) Berlin 2 August 2018 – 12 August 2018
- Competitors: 247
- Medals Ranked 5th: Gold 13 Silver 17 Bronze 23 Total 53

European Championships appearances
- 2018; 2022

Germany was one of the host nations of the inaugural 2018 European Championships in Berlin, Germany and Glasgow, United Kingdom. Germany competed at the championships which lasted from 2 to 12 August 2018. Germany competed in 7 sports.

== Medallists ==
Medal	Name	Sport	Event	Date
Gold	Annika Bruhn; Reva Foos; Isabel Marie Gose*; Jacob Heidtmann; Henning Mühlleitner; Marius Zobel*	Swimming	Mixed 4 × 200 metre freestyle relay	4 August
Gold	Lisa Brennauer	Cycling	Women's track individual pursuit	4 August
Gold	Malte Jakschik; Torben Johannesen; Hannes Ocik; Max Planer; Martin Sauer; Richard Schmidt; Jakob Schneider; Johannes Weissenfeld; Felix Wimberger	Rowing	Men's eight	5 August
Gold	Florian Wellbrock	Swimming	Men's 1500 metre freestyle	5 August
Gold	Domenic Weinstein	Cycling	Men's track individual pursuit	5 August
Gold	Stefan Bötticher	Cycling	Men's track keirin	7 August
Gold	Lou Massenberg; Tina Punzel	Diving	Mixed synchro 3m springboard	8 August
Gold	Arthur Abele	Athletics	Men's decathlon	8 August
Gold	Thomas Röhler	Athletics	Men's javelin throw	9 August
Gold	Christin Hussong	Athletics	Women's javelin throw	10 August
Gold	Mateusz Przybylko	Athletics	Men's high jump	11 August
Gold	Malaika Mihambo	Athletics	Women's long jump	11 August
Gold	Gesa Felicitas Krause	Athletics	Women's 3000 metres steeplechase	12 August
Silver	Joachim Eilers	Cycling	Men's track 1km time trial	4 August
Silver	Anna Knauer	Cycling	Women's track elimination race	5 August
Silver	Maria Kurjo; Lou Massenberg	Diving	Mixed team	6 August
Silver	Roger Kluge; Theo Reinhardt	Cycling	Men's track madison	6 August
Silver	Philip Heintz	Swimming	Men's 200 metre individual medley	6 August
Silver	Stefan Bötticher	Cycling	Men's track individual sprint	6 August
Silver	Sarah Köhler	Swimming	Women's 1500 metre freestyle	7 August
Silver	Gina Lückenkemper	Athletics	Women's 100 metres	7 August
Silver	Leonie Beck	Swimming	Women's 5km open water	8 August
Silver	Christina Schwanitz	Athletics	Women's shot put	8 August
Silver	Fabian Heinle	Athletics	Men's long jump	8 August
Silver	Pamela Dutkiewicz	Athletics	Women's 100 metres hurdles	9 August
Silver	Andreas Hofmann	Athletics	Men's javelin throw	9 August
Silver	Kristin Gierisch	Athletics	Women's triple jump	10 August
Silver	Leonie Beck; Sarah Köhler; Sören Meißner; Florian Wellbrock	Swimming	Mixed team 5km relay open water	11 August
Silver	Nadine Müller	Athletics	Women's discus throw	11 August
Silver	Lena Hentschel; Tina Punzel	Diving	Women's synchro 3m springboard	12 August
Bronze	Henning Mühlleitner	Swimming	Men's 400 metre freestyle	3 August
Bronze	Charlotte Becker; Lisa Brennauer; Mieke Kröger; Gudrun Stock	Cycling	Women's track team pursuit	3 August
Bronze	Emma Hinze; Miriam Welte	Cycling	Women's track team sprint	3 August
Bronze	Timo Bichler; Stefan Bötticher; Joachim Eilers	Cycling	Men's track team sprint	3 August
Bronze	Lisa Brennauer	Cycling	Women's road race	5 August
Bronze	Miriam Welte	Cycling	Women's track 500m time trial	6 August
Bronze	Maria Kurjo; Elena Wassen	Diving	Women's synchro 10m platform	7 August
Bronze	Annika Bruhn; Reva Foos; Isabel Marie Gose; Sarah Köhler; Marie Pietruschka*	Swimming	Women's 4 × 200 metre freestyle relay	7 August
Bronze	David Storl	Athletics	Men's shot put	7 August
Bronze	Trixi Worrack	Cycling	Women's road time trial	8 August
Bronze	Maximilian Schachmann	Cycling	Men's road time trial	8 August
Bronze	Maria Kurjo	Diving	Women's 10 m platform	8 August
Bronze	Florian Wellbrock	Swimming	Men's 800 metre freestyle	8 August
Bronze	Rob Muffels	Swimming	Men's 10km open water	9 August
Bronze	Christian Diener; Jan-Philip Glania*; Philip Heintz*; Marius Kusch; Fabian Schwingenschlögl; Damian Wierling	Swimming	Men's 4 × 100 metre medley relay	9 August
Bronze	Cindy Roleder	Athletics	Women's 100 metres hurdles	9 August
Bronze	Patrick Hausding; Lars Rüdiger	Diving	Men's synchro 3m springboard	10 August
Bronze	Marie-Laurence Jungfleisch	Athletics	Women's high jump	10 August
Bronze	Carolin Schäfer	Athletics	Women's heptathlon	10 August
Bronze	Florian Fandler; Elena Wassen	Diving	Mixed synchro 10m platform	11 August
Bronze	Tina Punzel	Diving	Women's 3m springboard	11 August
Bronze	Shanice Craft	Athletics	Women's discus throw	11 August
Bronze	Rebekka Haase; Lisa Marie Kwayie; Gina Lückenkemper; Tatjana Pinto	Athletics	Women's 4 × 100 metres relay	12 August

* Participated in the heats only and received medals.

Medals by sport
Sport	Gold medal	Silver medal	Bronze medal	Total
Aquatics	3	6	10	19
Athletics	6	7	6	19
Cycling	3	4	7	14
Rowing	1	0	0	1
Total	13	17	23	53

Medals by date
Day	Date	Gold medal	Silver medal	Bronze medal	Total
2	3 August	0	0	4	4
3	4 August	2	1	0	3
4	5 August	3	1	1	5
5	6 August	0	4	1	5
6	7 August	1	2	3	6
7	8 August	2	3	4	9
8	9 August	1	2	3	6
9	10 August	1	1	3	5
10	11 August	2	2	3	7
11	12 August	1	1	1	3
Total		13	17	23	53

Medals by gender
Gender	Gold medal	Silver medal	Bronze medal	Total
Male	7	6	8	21
Female	4	9	14	27
Mixed events	2	2	1	5
Total	13	17	23	53

== See also ==
- Germany at the 2018 European Athletics Championships
