= Netherlands at the 2018 European Championships =

- WA code: NED

in (United Kingdom) Glasgow (Germany) Berlin 2 August 2018 – 12 August 2018
- Competitors: 196
- Medals Ranked 4th: Gold 15 Silver 15 Bronze 13 Total 43

European Championships appearances
- 2018; 2022

Netherlands competed at the 2018 European Championships in Berlin, Germany, and Glasgow, Scotland, from 2 to 12 August 2018 in 6 of 7 sports.

== Medallists ==
Medal	Name	Sport	Event	Date
Gold	Jeffrey Hoogland; Harrie Lavreysen; Roy van den Berg	Cycling	Men's team sprint	3 August
Gold	Kirsten Wild	Cycling	Women's scratch	3 August
Gold	Matthijs Büchli	Cycling	Men's 1 km time trial	4 August
Gold	Marieke Keijser; Ilse Paulis	Rowing	Women's lightweight double sculls	5 August
Gold	Sanne Wevers	Gymnastics	Women's balance beam	5 August
Gold	Jeffrey Hoogland	Cycling	Men's sprint	6 August
Gold	Kirsten Wild	Cycling	Women's omnium	6 August
Gold	Ellen van Dijk	Cycling	Women's time trial	8 August
Gold	Celine van Duijn	Diving	Women's 10 m platform	8 August
Gold	Sharon van Rouwendaal	Swimming	Women's 5 km	8 August
Gold	Sharon van Rouwendaal	Swimming	Women's 10 km	9 August
Gold	Ferry Weertman	Swimming	Men's 10 km	9 August
Gold	Esmee Vermeulen; Sharon van Rouwendaal; Pepijn Smits; Ferry Weertman	Swimming	Team	11 August
Gold	Laura Smulders	Cycling	Women's BMX	11 August
Gold	Sifan Hassan	Athletics	Women's 5000 metres	12 August
Silver	Kim Busch; Femke Heemskerk; Kira Toussaint; Ranomi Kromowidjojo; Marjolein Delno*	Swimming	Women's 4 × 100 metre freestyle relay	3 August
Silver	Elsbeth Beeres; Laila Youssifou	Rowing	Women's pair	4 August
Silver	Roos de Jong; Lisa Scheenaard	Rowing	Women's double sculls	4 August
Silver	Vincent van der Want; Boudewijn Roell; Maarten Hurkmans; Simon van Dorp; Mechiel Versluis; Ruben Knab; Lex van den Herik; Freek Robbers; Diederik van Engelenburg	Rowing	Men's eight	5 August
Silver	Marianne Vos	Cycling	Women's road race	5 August
Silver	Femke Heemskerk	Swimming	Women's 200 metre freestyle	6 August
Silver	Femke Heemskerk	Swimming	Women's 100 metre freestyle	8 August
Silver	Nyls Korstanje; Stan Pijnenburg; Femke Heemskerk; Ranomi Kromowidjojo; Kyle Stolk*; Kira Toussaint*	Swimming	Mixed 4 × 100 metre freestyle relay	8 August
Silver	Anna van der Breggen	Cycling	Women's time trial	8 August
Silver	Susan Krumins	Athletics	Women's 10,000m	8 August
Silver	Dafne Schippers	Athletics	Women's 200m	11 August
Silver	Sharon van Rouwendaal	Swimming	Women's 25 km	12 August
Silver	Mathieu van der Poel	Cycling	Men's road race	12 August
Silver	Epke Zonderland	Gymnastics	Men's horizontal bar	12 August
Silver	Dafne Schippers; Marije van Hunenstijn; Jamile Samuel; Naomi Sedney	Athletics	Women's 4 × 100 metres relay	12 August
Bronze	Ranomi Kromowidjojo	Swimming	Women's 50 metre freestyle	4 August
Bronze	Sam Ligtlee	Cycling	Men's 1 km time trial	4 August
Bronze	Olivia van Rooijen; Karolien Florijn; Sophie Souwer; Nicole Beukers	Rowing	Women's quadruple sculls	4 August
Bronze	Elisabeth Hogerwerf; Marloes Oldenburg; Lies Rustenburg; Jose van Veen; Ymkje Clevering; Monica Lanz; Aletta Jorritsma; Carline Bouw; Dieuwke Fetter	Rowing	Women's eight	4 August
Bronze	Jorke Kooijenga; Koen van Brussel; Bart Lukkes; Ward van Zeijl	Rowing	Men's lightweight quadruple sculls	4 August
Bronze	Céline van Gerner; Vera van Pol; Naomi Visser; Tisha Volleman; Sanne Wevers	Gymnastics	Women's Team	4 August
Bronze	Harrie Lavreysen	Cycling	Men's sprint	6 August
Bronze	Kirsten Wild; Amy Pieters	Cycling	Women's madison	7 August
Bronze	Dafne Schippers	Athletics	Women's 100m	7 August
Bronze	Esmee Vermeulen	Swimming	Women's 10 km	9 August
Bronze	Jamile Samuel	Athletics	Women's 200m	11 August
Bronze	Lisanne de Witte	Athletics	Women's 400m	11 August
Bronze	Christopher Garia; Churandy Martina; Hensley Paulina; Taymir Burnet	Athletics	Men's 4 × 100 metres relay	12 August

* Participated in the heats only and received medals.

Medals by sport
Sport	1st place, gold medalist(s)	2nd place, silver medalist(s)	3rd place, bronze medalist(s)	Total
Aquatics	5	5	2	12
Athletics	1	3	4	8
Cycling	7	3	3	13
Gymnastics	1	1	1	3
Rowing	1	3	3	7
Total	15	15	13	43

Medals by date
Day	Date	1st place, gold medalist(s)	2nd place, silver medalist(s)	3rd place, bronze medalist(s)	Total
2	3 August	2	1	0	3
3	4 August	1	2	6	9
4	5 August	2	2	0	4
5	6 August	2	1	1	4
6	7 August	0	0	2	2
7	8 August	3	4	0	7
8	9 August	2	0	1	3
9	10 August	0	0	0	0
10	11 August	2	1	2	5
11	12 August	1	4	1	6
Total		15	15	13	43

Medals by gender
Gender	1st place, gold medalist(s)	2nd place, silver medalist(s)	3rd place, bronze medalist(s)	Total
Male	4	3	4	11
Female	10	11	9	30
Mixed events	1	1	0	2
Total	15	15	13	43

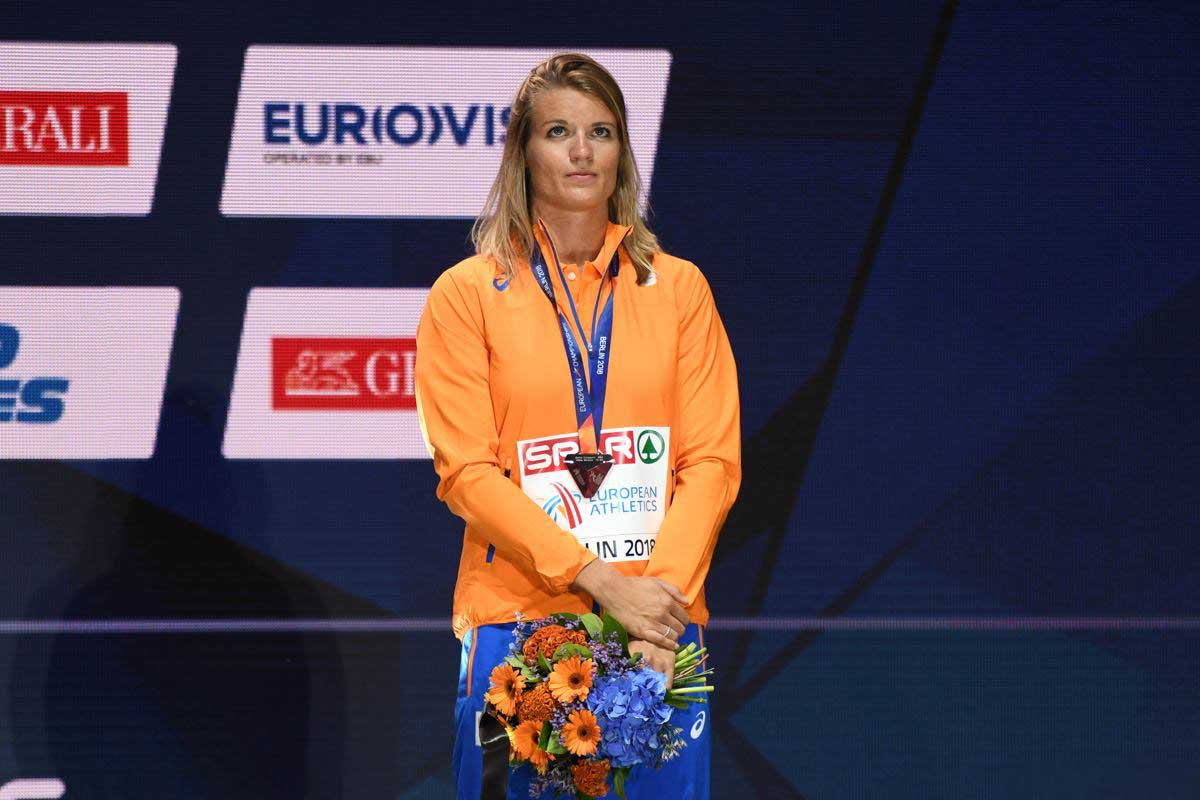
Athletics - Dafne Schippers won the silver medal

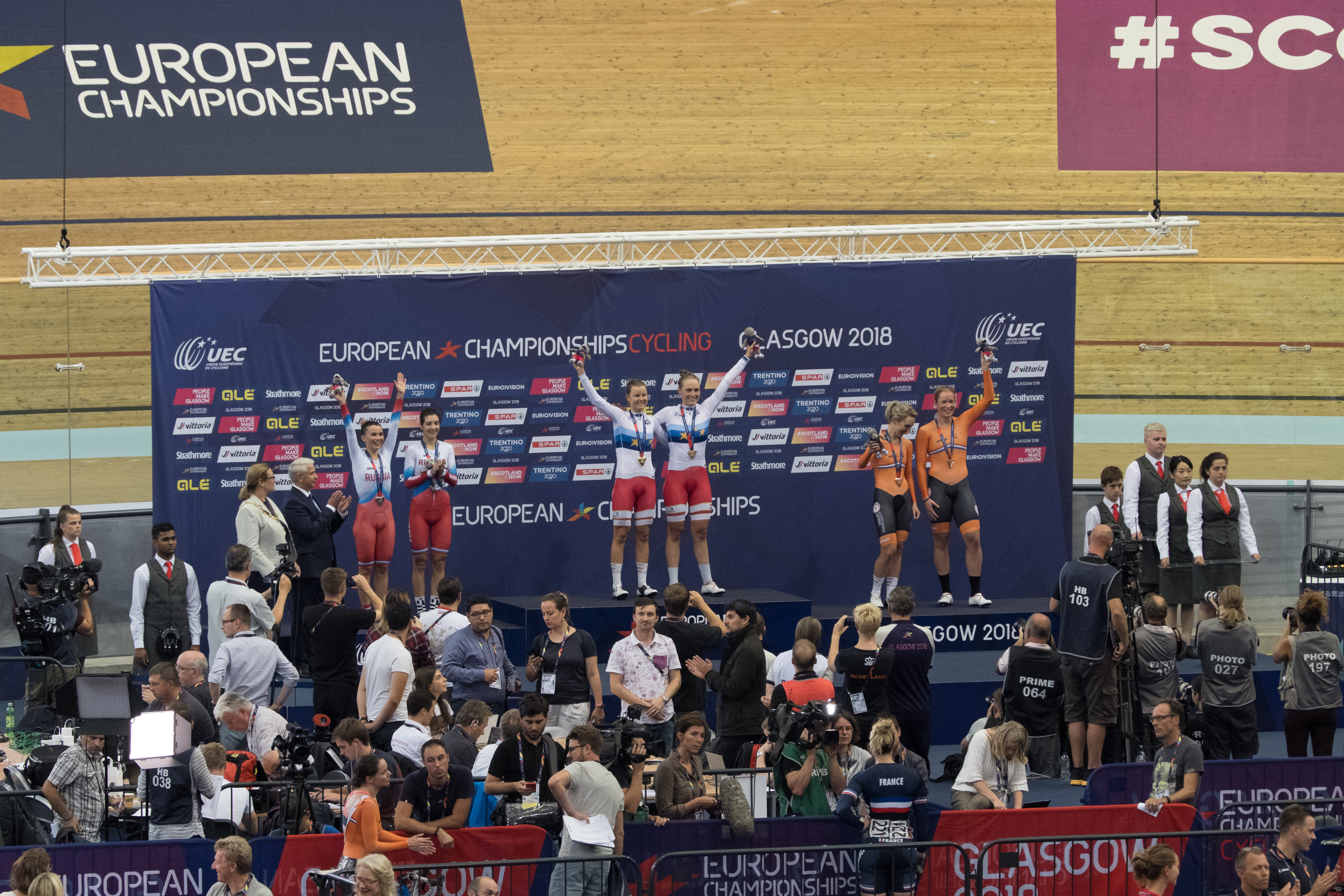
Track cycling - Podium in the women's madison with the Netherlands winning bronze
