= Estonia at the 2018 European Championships =

- IOC code: EST

in (United Kingdom) Glasgow (Germany) Berlin 2 August 2018 – 12 August 2018
- Competitors: 55 in 5 sports
- Medals Ranked 32nd: Gold 0 Silver 0 Bronze 1 Total 1

European Championships appearances
- 2018; 2022

Estonia competed at the inaugural 2018 European Championships from 2 to 12 August 2018. It competed in 5 sports of 7 with 55 athletes.

== Competitors ==
Sport	Men	Women	Total
Athletics	13	9	22
Aquatics	12	7	19
Cycling	5	2	7
Rowing	6	0	6
Triathlon	0	1	1
Total	36	19	55

== Medallists ==
Medal	Name	Sport	Event	Date
Bronze	Magnus Kirt	Athletics	Men's javelin throw	9 August

== Aquatics ==
=== Swimming ===
Men

Athlete	Event	Heat		Semifinal		Final	
Athlete	Event	Time	Rank	Time	Rank	Time	Rank
Marko-Matteus Langel	50 m freestyle	24.10	61	Did not advance			
Marko-Matteus Langel	100 m freestyle	51.95	72	Did not advance			
Marko-Matteus Langel	50 m backstroke	27.33	50	Did not advance			
Karl Johann Luht	50 m freestyle	23.22	49	Did not advance			
Karl Johann Luht	50 m backstroke	25.62	22	Did not advance			
Karl Johann Luht	100 m backstroke	55.60	31	Did not advance			
Nikita Tsernosev	50 m freestyle	23.52	53	Did not advance			
Nikita Tsernosev	100 m freestyle	51.61	69	Did not advance			
Nikita Tsernosev	200 m freestyle	1:55.11	56	Did not advance			
