= North Macedonia at the 2022 European Championships =

in (Germany) Munich 11 August 2022 – 21 August 2022
- Competitors: 10 in 5 sports
- Medals: Gold 0 Silver 0 Bronze 0 Total 0

European Championships appearances
- 2018; 2022

North Macedonia competed at the 2022 European Championships in Munich, Germany, from 11–21 August 2018.

== Competitors ==
The following is the list of number of competitors in the Championships:

Sport	Men	Women	Total
Athletics	1	1	2
Canoe sprint	2	0	2
Cycling road	2	0	2
Sport climbing	1	1	2
Table tennis	1	1	2
Total	7	3	10

== Athletics ==
North Macedonia entered the following athletes.

Key

- Q = Qualified for the next round
- q = Qualified for the next round as a fastest loser or, in field events, by position without achieving the qualifying target
- NR = National record
- PB = Personal best
- SB = Season best
- N/A = Round not applicable for the event

=== Men ===
Track and road events

Athlete	Event	Final	
Athlete	Event	Result	Rank
Dario Ivanovski	Marathon	DNF	

=== Women ===
Track and road events

Athlete	Event	Heat		Semifinal		Final	
Athlete	Event	Result	Rank	Result	Rank	Result	Rank
Drita Islami	400 m hurdles	1:01.56	24	Did not advance			
