= Latvia at the 2018 European Championships =

- IOC code: LAT

in (United Kingdom) Glasgow (Germany) Berlin 2 August 2018 – 12 August 2018
- Competitors: 40 in 5 sports
- Medals: Gold 0 Silver 0 Bronze 0 Total 0

European Championships appearances
- 2018; 2022

Latvia competed at the inaugural 7 sports 2018 European Championships from 2 to 12 August 2018. It competed in 5 sports.
