= Malta at the 2018 European Championships =

- IOC code: MLT

in (United Kingdom) Glasgow (Germany) Berlin 2 August 2018 – 12 August 2018
- Competitors: 6 in 2 sports

European Championships appearances
- 2018; 2022

Malta competed at the inaugural 7 sports 2018 European Championships from the 2nd August to the 12th August 2018. The country fielded 6 athletes across 2 sports—including 2 in athletics and 4 in swimming. A breakdown of the athletes and the events they participated in is below:

Athlete	Sport	Events	Result
Matthew Galea	Swimming	50m Backstroke, 100m Freestyle, 200m Freestyle, 50m Freestyle	Did Not Medal
Michael Stafrace	Swimming	100m Breaststroke, 50m Butterfly, 50m Breaststroke	Did Not Medal
Matthew Zammit	Swimming	100m Freestyle, 50m Freestyle	Did Not Medal
Thomas Wareing	Swimming	100m Backstroke, 200m Backstroke, 400m Individual Medley Men	Did Not Medal
Ian Paul Grech	Athletics	Long Jump Men	Did Not Medal
Charlotte Wingfield	Athletics	200m Running Women	Did Not Medal

The full 2018 results are here plus an update from World Athletics on other competitions Malta has since participated in. No participants medalled.
