= Andorra at the 2022 European Championships =

in (Germany) Munich 11 August 2022 – 22 August 2022
- Competitors: 1 in 1 sport
- Medals: Gold 0 Silver 0 Bronze 0 Total 0

European Championships appearances
- 2018; 2022

Andorra competed at the 2022 European Championships in Munich from August 11 to August 22, 2022.

== Competitors ==
The following is the list of number of competitors in the Championships:

| Sport | Men | Women | Total |
|---|---|---|---|
| Athletics | 1 | 0 | 1 |

== Athletics ==
Andorra entered the following athletes.

Men
Track and road

| Athlete | Event | Heats | | Semifinal | | Final | |
| Athlete | Event | Result | Rank | Result | Rank | Result | Rank |
|---|---|---|---|---|---|---|---|
| Nahuel Carabaña | 3000 m steeplechase | 9:37.74 | 32 | — | | did not advance | |
