= 2018 European Cycling Championships =

- Host city: Glasgow
- Country: United Kingdom
- Sport: 4
- Events: 30
- Opening: 2 August 2018
- Closing: 12 August 2018
- Website: glasgow2018.com

The 2018 European Road Championships and European Track Championships were held in Glasgow, United Kingdom, from 2 to 12 August 2018, the championships were part of the first European Championships with other six sports events happening in Glasgow and Berlin.

In 2018 for the first time the European championships of four cycling specialties (Road, Track, BMX and Mountain bike), were held in a single period and a single venue, and the events were part of the program of the first edition of the European Championships.

== Schedule and titles ==
Competition dates by discipline and titles are.

●	Event Competitions	1	Number of Gold Medal Events

August		2 Thu	3 Fri	4 Sat	5 Sun	6 Mon	7 Tue	8 Wed	9 Thu	10 Fri	11 Sat	12 Sun	Gold medal event
Cycling	Track	●	6	4	4	4	4						30
Cycling	Road				1			2				1	30
Cycling	Mountain Bike						2						30
Cycling	BMX									●	2		30

== Overall medal table ==
In the table the official medal table of the 2018 European Championships.

* Host nation (Great Britain)

Rank	Nation	Gold	Silver	Bronze	Total
1	Netherlands (NED)	7	3	3	13
2	Great Britain (GBR)*	5	4	3	12
3	Italy (ITA)	4	3	1	8
4	Germany (GER)	3	4	7	14
5	Russia (RUS)	3	2	4	9
6	Belgium (BEL)	2	2	3	7
7	Switzerland (SUI)	2	1	2	5
8	France (FRA)	1	4	2	7
9	Ukraine (UKR)	1	2	0	3
10	Denmark (DEN)	1	1	1	3
11	Poland (POL)	1	0	2	3
12	Portugal (POR)	0	2	0	2
13	Spain (ESP)	0	1	1	2
14	Belarus (BLR)	0	1	0	1
15	Austria (AUT)	0	0	1	1
Totals (15 entries)		30	30	30	90

== Track ==
Event	Gold		Silver		Bronze	
Men's Events
Keirin	Stefan Bötticher; Germany		Sébastien Vigier; France		Jack Carlin; Great Britain	
Omnium	Ethan Hayter; Great Britain	133	Elia Viviani; Italy	113	Casper Von Folsach; Denmark	113
Madison	Belgium (BEL); Robbe Ghys; Kenny De Ketele	60	Germany (GER); Theo Reinhardt; Roger Kluge	49	Great Britain (GBR); Oliver Wood; Ethan Hayter	38
Sprint	Jeffrey Hoogland; Netherlands		Stefan Bötticher; Germany		Harrie Lavreysen; Netherlands	
Team Sprint	Netherlands; Jeffrey Hoogland; Harrie Lavreysen; Roy van den Berg; Nils van 't Hoenderdaal	42.888	France; Sébastien Vigier; François Pervis; Quentin Lafargue; Michaël D'Almeida	43.693	Germany; Stefan Bötticher; Timo Bichler; Joachim Eilers	43.805
Team Pursuit	Italy; Filippo Ganna; Francesco Lamon; Elia Viviani; Michele Scartezzini; Liam Bertazzo	3:55.401	Switzerland; Cyrille Thièry; Stefan Bissegger; Frank Pasche; Théry Schir; Claudio Imhof	3:59.705	Great Britain; Ethan Hayter; Steven Burke; Kian Emadi; Charlie Tanfield; Oliver Wood	3:57.463
1 km Time Trial^{[N]}	Matthijs Büchli; Netherlands	1:00.134	Joachim Eilers; Germany	1:00.361	Sam Ligtlee; Netherlands	1:00.905
Pursuit^{[N]}	Domenic Weinstein; Germany	4:13.363	Ivo Oliveira; Portugal	4:15.304	Claudio Imhof; Switzerland	4:16.654
Points Race^{[O]}	Wojciech Pszczolarski; Poland	102	Kenny De Ketele; Belgium	83	Stefan Matzner; Austria	71
Scratch Race^{[O]}	Roman Gladysh; Ukraine		Adrien Garel; France		Tristan Marguet; Switzerland	
Elimination Race^{[O]}	Matthew Walls; Great Britain		Rui Oliveira; Portugal		Szymon Krawczyk; Poland	
Women's Events
Keirin	Mathilde Gros; France		Nicky Degrendele; Belgium		Daria Shmeleva; Russia	
Omnium	Kirsten Wild; Netherlands	156	Katie Archibald; Great Britain	144	Letizia Paternoster; Italy	111
Madison	Denmark; Julie Leth; Amalie Dideriksen	42	Russia; Gulnaz Badykova; Diana Klimova	38	Netherlands; Kirsten Wild; Amy Pieters	34
Sprint	Daria Shmeleva; Russia		Anastasiia Voynova; Russia		Mathilde Gros; France	
Team Sprint	Russia; Anastasiia Voynova; Daria Shmeleva	32.452	Ukraine; Liubov Basova; Olena Starikova	33.108	Germany; Miriam Welte; Emma Hinze	32.981
Team Pursuit	Great Britain; Elinor Barker; Laura Kenny; Katie Archibald; Neah Evans; Eleanor Dickinson	4:16.896	Italy; Letizia Paternoster; Marta Cavalli; Elisa Balsamo; Silvia Valsecchi	4:25.384	Germany; Charlotte Becker; Gudrun Stock; Mieke Kröger; Lisa Brennauer	4:23.105
500m Time Trial^{[N]}	Daria Shmeleva; Russia	33.285	Olena Starikova; Ukraine	33.593	Miriam Welte; Germany	33.600
Pursuit^{[N]}	Lisa Brennauer; Germany	3:26.879	Katie Archibald; Great Britain	3:29.577	Justyna Kaczkowska; Poland	3:34.750
Points Race^{[O]}	Maria Giulia Confalonieri; Italy	33	Ina Savenka; Belarus	32	Gulnaz Badykova; Russia	30
Scratch Race^{[O]}	Kirsten Wild; Netherlands		Emily Kay; Great Britain		Jolien D'Hoore; Belgium	
Elimination Race^{[O]}	Laura Kenny; Great Britain		Anna Knauer; Germany		Evgenia Augustinas; Russia	

Notes

- Competitors named in italics only participated in rounds prior to the final.
- ^{^{N}} These events are not contested in the Olympics.
- ^{^{O}} In the Olympics, these events are contested within the omnium only.

=== Medal table ===
* Host nation (Great Britain)

Rank	Nation	Gold	Silver	Bronze	Total
1	Netherlands (NED)	5	0	3	8
2	Great Britain (GBR)*	4	3	3	10
3	Germany (GER)	3	4	4	11
4	Russia (RUS)	3	2	3	8
5	Italy (ITA)	2	2	1	5
6	France (FRA)	1	3	1	5
7	Belgium (BEL)	1	2	1	4
8	Ukraine (UKR)	1	2	0	3
9	Poland (POL)	1	0	2	3
10	Denmark (DEN)	1	0	1	2
11	Portugal (POR)	0	2	0	2
12	Switzerland (SUI)	0	1	2	3
13	Belarus (BLR)	0	1	0	1
14	Austria (AUT)	0	0	1	1
Totals (14 entries)		22	22	22	66

== Road ==
Event	Gold	Silver	Bronze
Men's Events
Road race	Matteo Trentin; Italy	Mathieu van der Poel; Netherlands	Wout van Aert; Belgium
Time trial	Victor Campenaerts; Belgium	Jonathan Castroviejo; Spain	Maximilian Schachmann; Germany
Women's Events
Road race	Marta Bastianelli; Italy	Marianne Vos; Netherlands	Lisa Brennauer; Germany
Time trial	Ellen van Dijk; Netherlands	Anna van der Breggen; Netherlands	Trixi Worrack; Germany

=== Medal table ===
Rank	Nation	Gold	Silver	Bronze	Total
1	Italy (ITA)	2	0	0	2
2	Netherlands (NED)	1	3	0	4
3	Belgium (BEL)	1	0	1	2
4	Spain (ESP)	0	1	0	1
5	Germany (GER)	0	0	3	3
Totals (5 entries)		4	4	4	12

== Mountain bike ==
Event	Gold	Silver	Bronze
Men's Events
Cross-country	Lars Förster; Switzerland	Luca Braidot; Italy	David Valero; Spain
Women's Events
Cross-country	Jolanda Neff; Switzerland	Pauline Ferrand-Prévot; France	Githa Michiels; Belgium

=== Medal table ===
Rank	Nation	Gold	Silver	Bronze	Total
1	Switzerland (SUI)	2	0	0	2
2	France (FRA)	0	1	0	1
2	Italy (ITA)	0	1	0	1
4	Belgium (BEL)	0	0	1	1
4	Spain (ESP)	0	0	1	1
Totals (5 entries)		2	2	2	6

== BMX ==
Event	Gold	Silver	Bronze
Men's Events
Men	Kyle Evans; Great Britain	Kye Whyte; Great Britain	Sylvain Andre; France
Women's Events
Women	Laura Smulders; Netherlands	Simone Christensen; Denmark	Yaroslava Bondarenko; Russia

=== Medal table ===
* Host nation (Great Britain)

Rank	Nation	Gold	Silver	Bronze	Total
1	Great Britain (GBR)*	1	1	0	2
2	Netherlands (NED)	1	0	0	1
3	Denmark (DEN)	0	1	0	1
4	France (FRA)	0	0	1	1
4	Russia (RUS)	0	0	1	1
Totals (5 entries)		2	2	2	6

== See also ==
- Union Européenne de Cyclisme
