= Luxembourg at the 2022 European Championships =

in (Germany) Munich 11 August 2022 – 22 August 2022
- Competitors: 17 in 6 sports
- Medals Ranked 35th: Gold 0 Silver 0 Bronze 1 Total 1

European Championships appearances
- 2018; 2022

Luxembourg competed at the 2022 European Championships in Munich from August 11 to August 22, 2022.

== Medallists ==
Medal	Name	Sport	Event	Date
Bronze	Ni Xia Lian; Sarah de Nutte	Table tennis	Women's doubles	18 August

== Competitors ==
The following is the list of number of competitors in the Championships:

Sport	Men	Women	Total
Athletics	2	2	4
Gymnastics	0	1	1
Canoe sprint	1	0	1
Cycling road	2	1	3
Table tennis	2	4	6
Triathlon	2	0	2
Total	9	8	17

== Athletics ==
Luxembourg entered the following athletes.

Key

- Q = Qualified for the next round
- q = Qualified for the next round as a fastest loser or, in field events, by position without achieving the qualifying target
- NR = National record
- PB = Personal best
- SB = Season best
- N/A = Round not applicable for the event

=== Men ===
Track and road events

Athlete	Event	Heat		Semifinal		Final	
Athlete	Event	Result	Rank	Result	Rank	Result	Rank
Charles Grethen	1500 m	3:40.33	16	—		Did not advance	

Field events

Athlete	Event	Qualification		Final	
Athlete	Event	Distance	Position	Distance	Position
Bob Bertemes	Shot put	19.77	14	Did not advance	

=== Women ===
Track and road events

Athlete	Event	Heat		Semifinal		Final	
Athlete	Event	Result	Rank	Result	Rank	Result	Rank
Patrizia van der Weken	100 m	11.46	9 Q	11.51	17	Did not advance	
Victoria Rausch	100 m hurdles	13.37	11 q	13.33	20	Did not advance	

== Gymnastics ==
Luxembourg has entered one female gymnast.

=== Women ===
Qualification

Athlete	Qualification					
Athlete	Apparatus				Total	Rank
Athlete	V	UB	BB	F	Total	Rank
Céleste Mordenti						

== Triathlon ==
Athlete	Event	Swim (1.5 km)	Trans 1	Bike (40 km)	Trans 2	Run (10 km)	Total Time	Rank
Lucas Cambresy	Men's							
Bob Haller	Men's							
Gregor Payet	Men's							
