= Azerbaijan at the 2018 European Championships =

- IOC code: AZE

in (United Kingdom) Glasgow (Germany) Berlin 2 August 2018 – 12 August 2018
- Competitors: 18 in 6 sports
- Medals Ranked 29th: Gold 0 Silver 1 Bronze 0 Total 1

European Championships appearances
- 2018; 2022

Azerbaijan competed at the inaugural 7 sports 2018 European Championships from 2 to 12 August 2018. It competed in 6 sports.

== Medallists ==
| Medal | Name | Sport | Event | Date |
|---|---|---|---|---|
| Silver | Alexis Copello | Athletics | Men's triple jump | 12 August |
