= Slovenia at the 2018 European Championships =

- IOC code: SLO

in (United Kingdom) Glasgow (Germany) Berlin 2 August 2018 – 12 August 2018
- Competitors: 40 in 6 sports
- Medals Ranked 28th: Gold 0 Silver 1 Bronze 1 Total 2

European Championships appearances
- 2018; 2022

Slovenia competed at the inaugural 7 sports 2018 European Championships from 2 to 12 August 2018. It competed in 6 sports.

== Medallists ==
Medal	Name	Sport	Event	Date
Silver	Sašo Bertoncelj	Gymnastics	Men's pommel horse	12 August
Bronze	Peter John Stevens	Swimming	Men's 50 metre breaststroke	8 August
