= Azerbaijan at the 2022 European Championships =

in (Germany) Munich 11 August 2022 – 22 August 2022
- Competitors: 12 in 4 sports
- Medals: Gold 0 Silver 0 Bronze 0 Total 0

European Championships appearances
- 2018; 2022

Azerbaijan competed at the 2022 European Championships in Munich from 11 to 22 August 2022.

== Competitors ==
The following is the list of number of competitors in the Championships:

Sport	Men	Women	Total
Gymnastics	4	2	6
Athletics	2	2	4
Rowing	1	0	1
Triathlon	1	0	1
Total	8	4	12

== Athletics ==
Azerbaijan entered the following athletes.

Key

- Q = Qualified for the next round
- q = Qualified for the next round as a fastest loser or, in field events, by position without achieving the qualifying target
- NR = National record
- PB = Personal best
- SB = Season best
- N/A = Round not applicable for the event

=== Men ===
Field events

Athlete	Event	Qualification		Final	
Athlete	Event	Distance	Position	Distance	Position
Nazim Babayev	Triple jump	NM		did not advance	
Alexis Copello	Triple jump	NM		did not advance	

=== Women ===
Field events

Athlete	Event	Qualification		Final	
Athlete	Event	Distance	Position	Distance	Position
Yekaterina Sariyeva	Triple jump	13.66	13	did not advance	
Hanna Skydan	Hammer throw	74.57 SB	1 Q	70.88	4

== Gymnastics ==
Azerbaijan entered four male and two female athletes.

=== Men ===
Qualification

Athlete	Event	Qualification								Final							
Athlete	Event	Apparatus						Total	Rank	Apparatus						Total	Rank
Athlete	Event	F	PH	R	V	PB	HB	Total	Rank	F	PH	R	V	PB	HB	Total	Rank
Aghamurad Gahramanov	Team	12.433	9.300	12.066	13.533	12.600	11.566	71.498	67	Did not advance							
Mansum Safarov	Team	12.800	8.866	11.900	12.466	11.700	11.366	69.098	71	Did not advance							
Nikita Simonov	Team	—		14.600 Q	—	11.666	12.833	—		Did not advance							
İvan Tixonov	Team	13.600	12.233	13.833	14.333 Q	13.800	13.400	81.199	16	Did not advance							
Total	Team	38.833	30.399	40.499	40.332	38.100	37.799	225.962	24	Did not advance							

Individual finals

Athlete	Event	Apparatus						Total	Rank
Athlete	Event	F	PH	R	V	PB	HB	Total	Rank
Nikita Simonov	Rings	—		14.566	—			14.566	6
İvan Tixonov	Vault	—			14.266	—		14.266	6

=== Women ===
Qualification

Athlete	Qualification					
Athlete	Apparatus				Total	Rank
Athlete	V	UB	BB	F	Total	Rank
Samira Gahramanova	11.733	7.366	9.100	10.266	38.465	84
Milana Minakovskaya	11.500	9.966	9.500	10.366	41.332	79

== Rowing ==
Source=

Men

Athlete	Event	Heats		Repechage		Semifinals		Final	
Athlete	Event	Time	Rank	Time	Rank	Time	Rank	Time	Rank
Bahman Nasiri	Single sculls	8:26.20	5 R	7:58.31	3 SC/D	Cancelled		7:54.54	16

== Triathlon ==
Athlete	Event	Swim (1.5 km)	Trans 1	Bike (40 km)	Trans 2	Run (10 km)	Total Time	Rank
Rostislav Pevtsov	Men's	18:37	0:33	51:16	0:29	32:06	1:43:01	14
