= Malta at the 2022 European Championships =

in (Germany) Munich 11 August 2022 – 22 August 2022
- Competitors: 4 in 2 sports
- Medals: Gold 0 Silver 0 Bronze 0 Total 0

European Championships appearances
- 2018; 2022

Malta competed at the 2022 European Championships in Munich from August 11 to August 22, 2022.

== Competitors ==
The following is the list of number of competitors in the Championships:

Sport	Men	Women	Total
Athletics	0	2	2
Gymnastics	0	2	2
Total	0	4	4

== Athletics ==
Malta entered the following athletes.

Key

- Q = Qualified for the next round
- q = Qualified for the next round as a fastest loser or, in field events, by position without achieving the qualifying target
- NR = National record
- PB = Personal best
- SB = Season best
- N/A = Round not applicable for the event

=== Women ===
Track and road events

Athlete	Event	Heat		Semifinal		Final	
Athlete	Event	Result	Rank	Result	Rank	Result	Rank
Janet Richard	400 m	53.49 NR	21	Did not advance			

Field events

Athlete	Event	Qualification		Final	
Athlete	Event	Distance	Position	Distance	Position
Claire Azzopardi	Long jump	5.60	22	Did not advance	

== Gymnastics ==
Malta has entered two female gymnasts.

=== Women ===
Qualification

Athlete	Qualification					
Athlete	Apparatus				Total	Rank
Athlete	V	UB	BB	F	Total	Rank
Ella Borg						
Tara Vella Clark						
