= Iceland at the 2022 European Championships =

in (Germany) Munich 11 August 2022 – 22 August 2022
- Competitors: 17 in 3 sports
- Medals: Gold 0 Silver 0 Bronze 0 Total 0

European Championships appearances
- 2018; 2022

Iceland competed at the 2022 European Championships in Munich from August 11 to August 22, 2022.

== Competitors ==
The following is the list of number of competitors in the Championships:

Sport	Men	Women	Total
Athletics	2	1	3
Gymnastics (men and women)	5	5	10
Cycling road	1	3	4
Total	8	9	17

== Athletics ==
Iceland entered the following athletes.

Key

- Q = Qualified for the next round
- q = Qualified for the next round as a fastest loser or, in field events, by position without achieving the qualifying target
- NR = National record
- PB = Personal best
- SB = Season best
- N/A = Round not applicable for the event

=== Men ===
Field events

Athlete	Event	Qualification		Final	
Athlete	Event	Distance	Position	Distance	Position
Hilmar Örn Jónsson	Hammer throw	76.33 SB	7 q	70.03	12
Guðni Valur Guðnason	Discus throw	61.80	12 q	61.00	11

=== Women ===
Field events

Athlete	Event	Qualification		Final	
Athlete	Event	Distance	Position	Distance	Position
Erna Sóley Gunnarsdóttir	Shot put	16.41	22	did not advance	

== Cycling ==
=== Road ===
Men

Athlete	Event	Time	Rank
Ingvar Ómarsson	Road race	4:42:20	111
Ingvar Ómarsson	Time trial	31:12.19	30

Women

Athlete	Event	Time	Rank
Silja Jóhannesdóttir	Road race	DNF	
Silja Rúnarsdóttir	Time trial	35:44.78	28
Hafdís Sigurðardóttir	Road race	DNF	
Hafdís Sigurðardóttir	Time trial	34:58.81	26

== Gymnastics ==
Iceland entered five male and five female athletes.

=== Men ===
Qualification

Athlete	Event	Qualification								Final							
Athlete	Event	Apparatus						Total	Rank	Apparatus						Total	Rank
Athlete	Event	F	PH	R	V	PB	HB	Total	Rank	F	PH	R	V	PB	HB	Total	Rank
Martin Guðmundsson	Team	13.233	10.766	12.033	12.800	7.666	12.600	69.098	70	Did not advance							
Jón Gunnarsson	Team	—		12.233	—		DNS	—		Did not advance							
Valgarð Reinhardsson	Team	13.433	11.933	12.633	14.033	12.733	12.333	77.098	42	Did not advance							
Jonas Ingi Þorisson	Team	12.633	10.700	11.200	13.666	12.533	12.133	72.865	61	Did not advance							
Atli Snær Valgeirsson	Team	12.333	11.500	—	12.833	9.000	—			Did not advance							
Total	Team	39.299	34.199	36.899	40.532	34.266	37.066	222.261	26	Did not advance							

=== Women ===
Qualification

Athlete	Event	Qualification						Final					
Athlete	Event	Apparatus				Total	Rank	Apparatus				Total	Rank
Athlete	Event	V	UB	BB	F	Total	Rank	V	UB	BB	F	Total	Rank
Þelma Aðalsteinsdóttir	Team	12.333	11.733	12.233	11.133	47.432	42	Did not advance					
Hildur Guðmundsdóttir	Team	11.766	9.666	11.166	11.800	44.398	63	Did not advance					
Guðrún Harðardóttir	Team	—	10.100	11.333	—			Did not advance					
Margrét Kristinsdóttir	Team	11.333	—		11.933	—		Did not advance					
Agnes Suto	Team	11.566	10.500	7.933	11.666	41.665	78	Did not advance					
Total	Team	35.665	32.333	34.732	35.399	138.129	23	Did not advance					
