= Glasgow BMX Centre =

Outdoor BMX racing facility in Knightswood, Glasgow, Scotland

- Interactive map of Glasgow BMX Centre
- Full name: Glasgow BMX Centre
- Location: Knightswood, Glasgow, Scotland
- Coordinates: 55.8941835°N 4.3519439°W
- Owner: Glasgow City Council
- Operator: Glasgow Life
- Field size: 400 m (1,312 ft)
- Public transit: Scotstounhill

Construction
- Groundbreaking: 2017
- Built: 2017–2018
- Opened: 28 February 2018
- Cost: £3.7 million

The Glasgow BMX Centre is an outdoor BMX racing facility in Knightswood, Glasgow, Scotland.

== Events ==
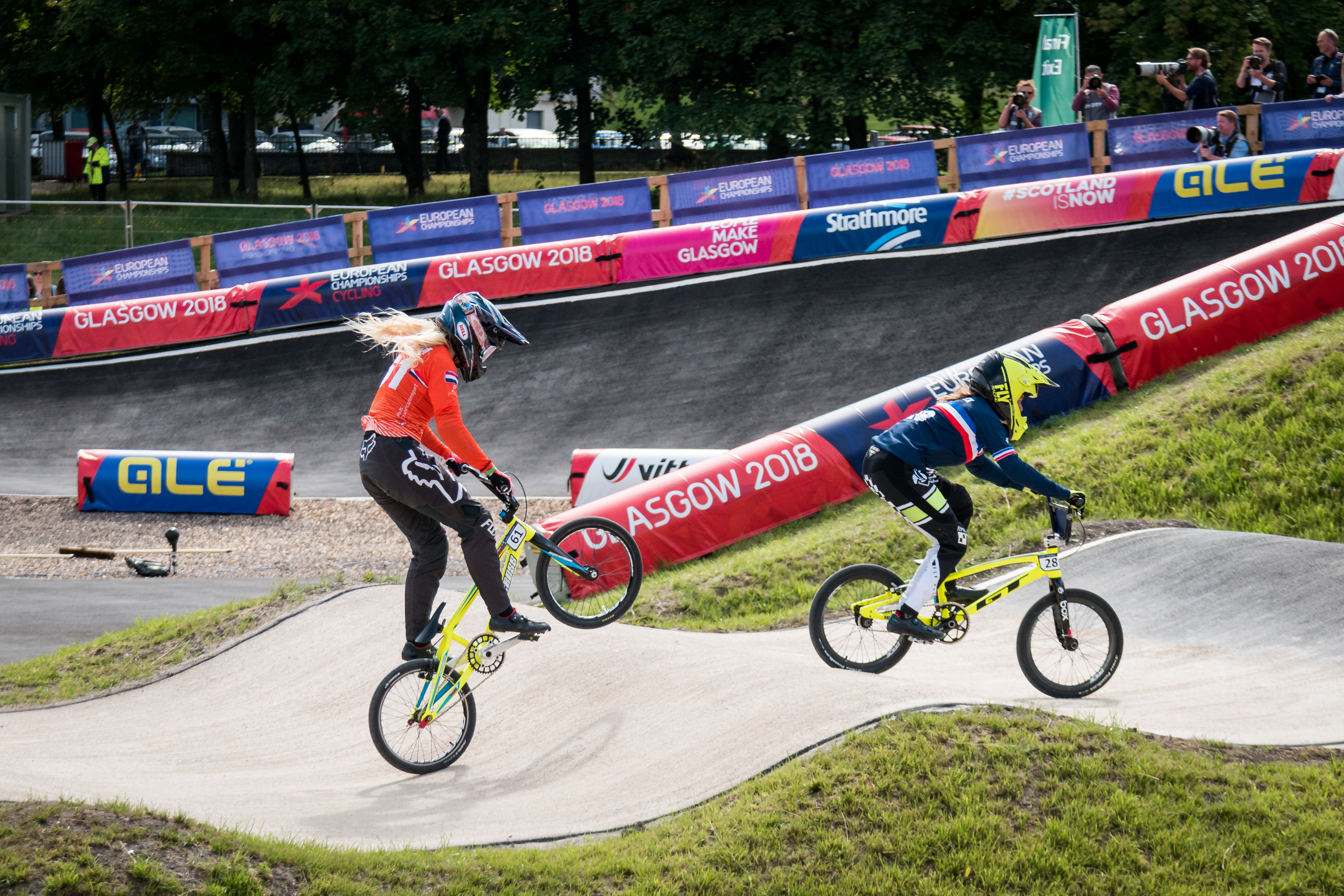
Riders racing in the women's event of the 2018 European BMX Championships

The first major event hosted at the centre was the 2018 European BMX Championships, which formed part of the 2018 European Championships across the cities of Glasgow and Berlin.

In May 2022, it hosted the opening round of the UCI BMX Racing World Cup.

It is due to host the 2023 UCI BMX World Championships as part of the inaugural UCI Cycling World Championships held in Glasgow.

== See also ==
- Commonwealth Arena and Sir Chris Hoy Velodrome
