= Estonia at the 2022 European Championships =

in (Germany) Munich 11 August 2022 – 22 August 2022
- Competitors: 38 in 8 sports
- Medals Ranked 35th: Gold 0 Silver 0 Bronze 1 Total 1

European Championships appearances
- 2018; 2022

Estonia competed at the 2022 European Championships in Munich from August 11 to August 22, 2022.

== Medallists ==
Medal	Name	Sport	Event	Date
Bronze	Janek Õiglane	Athletics	Men's decathlon	16 August

== Competitors ==
The following is the list of number of competitors in the Championships:

Sport	Men	Women	Total
Athletics	9	3	12
Beach volleyball	2	0	2
Canoe sprint	2	1	3
Cycling mountain bike	0	1	1
Cycling road	5	0	5
Rowing	7	0	7
Table tennis	2	2	4
Triathlon	3	1	4
Total	30	8	38

== Athletics ==
Estonia entered 12 athletes.

The following athletes qualified with the entry standard:

- men's marathon: Roman Fosti, Tiidrek Nurme, Kaur Kivistik
- men's 400m and 400m hurdles: ~~Rasmus Mägi~~ (withdrew due to an injury)
- men's decathlon (maximum of 3 athletes allowed per nation): Karel Tilga, Maicel Uibo, Janek Õiglane, ~~Kristjan Rosenberg~~ (injured), ~~Johannes Erm, Risto Lillemets~~
- women's high jump: Karmen Bruus

The following athletes qualified with their rating:

- men's 100m: Karl Erik Nazarov
- men's 110m hurdles: Keiso Pedriks
- men's long jump: Hans-Christian Hausenberg
- women's 400m hurdles: Marielle Kleemeier
- women's javelin throw: Gedly Tugi

=== Men ===
Track and road events

Athlete	Event	Heat		Semifinal		Final	
Athlete	Event	Result	Rank	Result	Rank	Result	Rank
Karl Erik Nazarov	100 m	10.39	13	Did not advance			
Roman Fosti	Marathon	—				2:19:34	41
Kaur Kivistik	Marathon	—				2:17:51	32
Tiidrek Nurme	Marathon	—				2:12:46	11
Estonia	Marathon team	—				6:50:11	6
Keiso Pedriks	110 m hurdles	13.83	11	Did not advance			

Field events

Athlete	Event	Qualification		Final	
Athlete	Event	Distance	Position	Distance	Position
Hans-Christian Hausenberg	Long jump	NM	–	Did not advance	

Combined events – Decathlon

Athlete	Event	100 m	LJ	SP	HJ	400 m	110H	DT	PV	JT	1500 m	Final	Rank
Janek Õiglane	Result	11.01	7.27 SB	14.82	2.02	48.80 PB	14.39	41.97	5.10	70.94	4:42.78	8346	3rd place, bronze medalist(s)
Janek Õiglane	Points	858	878	779	822	871	925	705	941	904	663	8346	3rd place, bronze medalist(s)
Karel Tilga	Result	11.27 SB	7.28 SB	15.21 SB	1.96 SB	50.66 SB	15.16 SB	49.91	NM	DNS		DNF	-
Karel Tilga	Points	801	881	803	767	784	830	869	0	-	-	DNF	-
Maicel Uibo	Result	11.30	7.23	14.55	2.08	50.21 SB	14.79	46.59	5.30 =SB	62.74	4:42.18	8234	5
Maicel Uibo	Points	795	869	762	878	805	875	800	1004	779	667	8234	5

=== Women ===
Track and road events

Athlete	Event	Heat		Semifinal		Final	
Athlete	Event	Result	Rank	Result	Rank	Result	Rank
Marielle Kleemeier	400 m hurdles	57.46	21	Did not advance			

Field events

Athlete	Event	Qualification		Final	
Athlete	Event	Distance	Position	Distance	Position
Karmen Bruus	High jump	1.83	15	Did not advance	
Gedly Tugi	Javelin throw	54.38	18	Did not advance	

== Beach volleyball ==
Estonia has qualified 1 male pair.

Athlete	Event	Preliminary round			Round of 24	Round of 16	Quarterfinals	Semifinals	Final / BM	Rank
Athlete	Event	Opposition Score	Opposition Score	Rank	Opposition Score	Opposition Score	Opposition Score	Opposition Score	Opposition Score	Rank
Kusti Nõlvak; Mart Tiisaar	Men's	Nurminen – Sirén (FIN); W 2–0	Krattiger–Breer (SUI); L 0–2	2	Sowa–Pfretzschner (GER); W 2–0	Hörl–Horst (AUT); L 1–2	Did not advance			9

== Canoeing ==
Men

Athlete	Event	Heats		Semifinals		Final	
Athlete	Event	Time	Rank	Time	Rank	Time	Rank
Joosep Karlson	C-1 500 m	1:57.075	4 SF	1:54.194	7 FB	1:55.737	16
Joosep Karlson	C-1 1000 m	4:28.307	6 SF	4:28.805	7	Did not advance	13
Kevin Poljans	K-1 500 m	1:50.314	7 SF	1:54.956	9	Did not advance	21
Kevin Poljans	K-1 1000 m	4:00.205	8	Did not advance			24
Kevin Poljans	K-1 5000 m	—				KO	14

== Cycling ==
=== Road ===
Men

Athlete	Event	Time	Rank
Tanel Kangert	Road race	4:39:18	62
Tanel Kangert	Time trial	28:31.33	10
Martin Laas	Road race	4:38:49	12
Karl Patrick Lauk	Road race	4:40:59	94
Oskar Nisu	Road race	4:40:10	85
Norman Vahtra	Road race	4:39:18	63

=== Mountain bike ===
Athlete	Event	Time	Rank
Janika Lõiv	Women's cross-country	1:34:04	11

== Rowing ==
Estonia entered 7 rowers. Kaspar Taimsoo in single sculls was replaced by Andrei Jämsä.

Men

Athlete	Event	Heats		Repechage		Semifinals		Final		Overall rank
Athlete	Event	Time	Rank	Time	Rank	Time	Rank	Time	Rank	Overall rank
Andrei Jämsä	Single sculls	8:32.71	4 R	8:13.64	5 SC/D	CNC	FC	8:12.14	5	17
Mikhail Kushteyn; Allar Raja; Tõnu Endrekson; Johann Poolak	Quadruple sculls	6:41.64	4 R	6:14.87	2 SA/B	6:22.53	3 FA	6:13.82	5	5
Ander Koppel; Elar Loot	Lightweight double sculls	7:31.83	6 R	7:09.85	4 FB	-		6:59.60	4	10

== Table tennis ==
=== Men ===
Athlete	Event	Group stage				Preliminary Round 1	Preliminary Round 2	Round of 64	Round of 32	Round of 16	Quarterfinals	Semifinals	Final / BM	
Athlete	Event	Opposition Score	Opposition Score	Opposition Score	Rank	Opposition Score	Opposition Score	Opposition Score	Opposition Score	Opposition Score	Opposition Score	Opposition Score	Opposition Score	Rank
Toomas Libene	Singles	Kulczycki (POL); L 0–3	Žeimys (LTU); L 0–3	András (HUN); L 0–3	4	Did not advance								
Aleksandr Smirnov	Singles	Zhmudenko (UKR); L 1–3	Krastev (BUL); L 0–3	Širuček (CZE); L 0–3	4	Did not advance								
Toomas Libene; Aleksandr Smirnov	Doubles	—				Bye	Redzimski (POL) / Ursu (MDA); L 1–3	—	Did not advance					

=== Women ===
Athlete	Event	Group stage			Preliminary Round 1	Preliminary Round 2	Round of 64	Round of 32	Round of 16	Quarterfinals	Semifinals	Final / BM	
Athlete	Event	Opposition Score	Opposition Score	Rank	Opposition Score	Opposition Score	Opposition Score	Opposition Score	Opposition Score	Opposition Score	Opposition Score	Opposition Score	Rank
Airi Avameri	Singles	Kaufmann (GER); L 1–3	Terpou (GRE); W 3–1	2	Plaian (ROU); L 1–3	Did not advance							
Reelica Hanson	Singles	Arlia (ITA); L 1–3	Bardsley (ENG); L 0–3	3	Did not advance								
Airi Avameri; Reelica Hanson	Doubles	—			Bye	Vignjević / Lupulesku (SRB); L 1–3	—	Did not advance					

=== Mixed ===
Athlete	Event	Preliminary Round 1	Preliminary Round 2	Round of 32	Round of 16	Quarterfinals	Semifinals	Final / BM	
Athlete	Event	Opposition Score	Opposition Score	Opposition Score	Opposition Score	Opposition Score	Opposition Score	Opposition Score	Rank
Aivi Avameri; Toomas Libene	Doubles	Mladenovski / Uce-Nikolov (MKD); W 3–0	Möregårdh / Bergström (SWE); L 2–3	Did not advance					
Reelica Hanson; Aleksandr Smirnov	Doubles	Kogans (LAT) / Betz (FIN); L 1–3	Did not advance						

== Triathlon ==
Athlete	Event	Swim (1.5 km)	Trans 1	Bike (40 km)	Trans 2	Run (10 km)	Total Time	Rank
Henry Räppo	Men's	18:22	0:44	0:51:19	0:23	0:36:49	1:47:35	41
Kevin Vabaorg	Men's	19:12	0:35	LAP				
Kaidi Kivioja	Women's	20:56	0:36	0:58:47	0:26	0:38:44	1:59:28	32
