= Moldova at the 2022 European Championships =

in (Germany) Munich 11 August 2022 – 21 August 2022
- Competitors: 17 in 4 sports
- Medals Ranked 33rd: Gold 0 Silver 1 Bronze 0 Total 1

European Championships appearances
- 2018; 2022

Moldova competed at the 2022 European Championships in Munich, Germany, from 11–21 August 2018.

== Medallists ==
Medal	Name	Sport	Event	Date
Silver	Serghei Tarnovschi	Canoeing	Men's C–1 500 metres	21 August

== Competitors ==
The following is the list of number of competitors in the Championships:

Sport	Men	Women	Total
Athletics	4	3	7
Canoe sprint	3	2	1
Rowing	2	0	2
Table Tennis	2	1	3
Total	11	6	17

== Athletics ==
Moldova entered the following athletes.

Key

- Q = Qualified for the next round
- q = Qualified for the next round as a fastest loser or, in field events, by position without achieving the qualifying target
- NR = National record
- PB = Personal best
- SB = Season best
- N/A = Round not applicable for the event

=== Men ===
Track and road events

Athlete	Event	Final	
Athlete	Event	Result	Rank
Maxim Răileanu	Marathon	2:21:01	47
Ivan Siuris	Marathon	2:25:17	56

Field events

Athlete	Event	Qualification		Final	
Athlete	Event	Distance	Position	Distance	Position
Serghei Marghiev	Hammer throw	74.26	11 q	73.89	10
Andrian Mardare	Javelin throw	78.78	6 q	77.49	7

=== Women ===
Track and road events

Athlete	Event	Final	
Athlete	Event	Result	Rank
Lilia Fisikovici	Marathon	2:47:44	47

Field events

Athlete	Event	Qualification		Final	
Athlete	Event	Distance	Position	Distance	Position
Dimitriana Bezede	Shot put	17.76	9 q	16.98	11
Zalina Marghieva	Hammer throw	67.15	16	did not advance	
