= Latvia at the 2022 European Championships =

in (Germany) Munich 11 August 2022 – 22 August 2022
- Competitors: 52 in 11 sports
- Medals Ranked 28th: Gold 1 Silver 1 Bronze 0 Total 2

European Championships appearances
- 2018; 2022

Latvia competed at the 2022 European Championships in Munich from August 11 to August 22, 2022.

== Medallists ==
Medal	Name	Sport	Event	Date
Gold	Tīna Graudiņa; Anastasija Kravčenoka	Beach volleyball	Women's tournament	20 August
Silver	Roberts Akmens	Canoe sprint	Men's K-1 200 m	21 August

== Competitors ==
The following is the list of number of competitors in the Championships:

Sport	Men	Women	Total
Athletics	4	4	8
Beach volleyball	2	2	4
Gymnastics (men and women)	2	5	7
Canoe sprint	10	6	16
Cycling BMX	3	0	3
Cycling mountain bike	1	0	1
Cycling road	3	2	5
Cycling track	1	0	1
Sport climbing	1	0	1
Table tennis	2	2	4
Triathlon	1	1	2
Total	30	22	52

== Athletics ==
Latvia entered the following athletes.

Key

- Q = Qualified for the next round
- q = Qualified for the next round as a fastest loser or, in field events, by position without achieving the qualifying target
- NR = National record
- PB = Personal best
- SB = Season best
- N/A = Round not applicable for the event

=== Men ===
Track and road events

Athlete	Event	Final	
Athlete	Event	Result	Rank
Raivo Saulgriezis	20 km walk	1:29:24	23

Field events

Athlete	Event	Qualification		Final	
Athlete	Event	Distance	Position	Distance	Position
Patriks Gailums	Javelin throw	77.55	8 q	78.82	6
Rolands Štrobinders	Javelin throw	77.33	10 q	77.10	8
Gatis Čakšs	Javelin throw	74.63	17	Did not advance	

=== Women ===
Track and road events

Athlete	Event	Heat		Semifinal		Final	
Athlete	Event	Result	Rank	Result	Rank	Result	Rank
Gunta Vaičule	400 m	52.26	9 Q	51.25 PB	10	Did not advance	

Field events

Athlete	Event	Qualification		Final	
Athlete	Event	Distance	Position	Distance	Position
Rūta Kate Lasmane	Triple jump	13.49	17	Did not advance	
Madara Palameika	Javelin throw	60.56 SB	4 q	56.55	9
Līna Mūze	Javelin throw	57.69	10 q	58.11	7

== Beach Volleyball ==
Latvia qualified 1 male and 1 female pair.

Athlete	Event	Preliminary round			Round of 24	Round of 16	Quarterfinals	Semifinals	Final / BM	
Athlete	Event	Opposition Score	Opposition Score	Rank	Opposition Score	Opposition Score	Opposition Score	Opposition Score	Opposition Score	Rank
Aleksandrs Samoilovs; Jānis Šmēdiņš	Men's	Kantor – Rudol (POL)								
Anastasija Kravčenoka; Tīna Graudiņa	Women's	Windeleff – Bisgaard (DEN)								

== Gymnastics ==
Latvia entered two male and five female athletes.

=== Men ===
Qualification

Athlete	Qualification						Total	Rank
Athlete	Apparatus						Total	Rank
Athlete	F	PH	R	V	PB	HB	Total	Rank
Dmitrijs Mickevics								
Ricards Plate								

=== Women ===
Qualification

Athlete	Event	Qualification						Final					
Athlete	Event	Apparatus				Total	Rank	Apparatus				Total	Rank
Athlete	Event	V	UB	BB	F	Total	Rank	V	UB	BB	F	Total	Rank
Anastasija Ananjeva	Team											—N/a	
Darja Eļbe	Team											—N/a	
Anna Ločmele	Team											—N/a	
Elena Melke	Team											—N/a	
Arina Olenova	Team											—N/a	
Total	Team												

== Triathlon ==
Athlete	Event	Swim (1.5 km)	Trans 1	Bike (40 km)	Trans 2	Run (10 km)	Total Time	Rank
Artūrs Liepa	Men's							
Baiba Medne	Women's							
