= Macedonia at the 2018 European Championships =

- IOC code: MKD

in (United Kingdom) Glasgow (Germany) Berlin 2 August 2018 – 12 August 2018
- Competitors: 2 in 1 sport

European Championships appearances
- 2018; 2022

Macedonia competed at the inaugural 7 sports 2018 European Championships from 2 to 12 August 2018. It competed in 1 sport.
