= Andorra at the 2018 European Championships =

- IOC code: AND

in (United Kingdom) Glasgow (Germany) Berlin 2 August 2018 – 12 August 2018
- Competitors: 1 (1 man) in 1 sport
- Medals: Gold 0 Silver 0 Bronze 0 Total 0

European Championships appearances
- 2018; 2022

Andorra competed at the inaugural 7 sports 2018 European Championships from 2 to 12 August 2018. It competed in 1 sport.

== Athletics ==
1 athlete represented Andorra in the athletics events.

Men
Track and road

Athlete	Event	Heats		Semifinal		Final	
Athlete	Event	Result	Rank	Result	Rank	Result	Rank
Carles Gómez	1500 metres	4:00.02	34	—N/a		did not advance	
