= Georgia at the 2022 European Championships =

in (Germany) Munich 11 August 2022 – 22 August 2022
- Competitors: 15 in 3 sports
- Medals: Gold 0 Silver 0 Bronze 0 Total 0

European Championships appearances
- 2018; 2022

Georgia competed at the 2022 European Championships in Munich from August 11 to August 22, 2022.

== Competitors ==
The following is the list of number of competitors in the Championships:

| Sport | Men | Women | Total |
|---|---|---|---|
| Athletics | 1 | 1 | 2 |
| Gymnastics (men and women) | 5 | 1 | 6 |
| Canoe sprint | 5 | 2 | 7 |
| Total | 11 | 4 | 15 |

== Athletics ==
Georgia entered the following athletes.

Key

- Q = Qualified for the next round
- q = Qualified for the next round as a fastest loser or, in field events, by position without achieving the qualifying target
- NR = National record
- PB = Personal best
- SB = Season best
- N/A = Round not applicable for the event

=== Men ===
Field events

| Athlete | Event | Qualification | | Final | |
| Athlete | Event | Distance | Position | Distance | Position |
|---|---|---|---|---|---|
| Giorgi Mujaridze | Shot put | 19.43 | 17 | Did not advance | |

=== Women ===
Field events

| Athlete | Event | Qualification | | Final | |
| Athlete | Event | Distance | Position | Distance | Position |
|---|---|---|---|---|---|
| Sopo Shatirishvili | Shot put | 15.52 | 24 | Did not advance | |

== Canoeing ==
Men

| Athlete | Event | Heats | | Semifinals | | Final | |
| Athlete | Event | Time | Rank | Time | Rank | Time | Rank |
|---|---|---|---|---|---|---|---|
| Zaza Nadiradze | C-1 200 m | 43.170 | 8 BT | 39.910 | 1 F | 40.562 | 4 |
| Aleksandre Tsivtsivadze | C-1 500 m | 1:54.002 | 4 SF | Disqualified | | | |
| Gia Gabedava; Malkhaz Tchintcharashvili | C-2 500 m | 1:52.034 | 6 SF | 1:45.120 | 7 | Did not advance | 13 |
| Badri Kavelashvili | K-1 200 m | 35.173 | 1 F | Bye | | 37.101 | 5 |

Women

| Athlete | Event | Heats | | Semifinals | | Final | |
| Athlete | Event | Time | Rank | Time | Rank | Time | Rank |
|---|---|---|---|---|---|---|---|
| Mariam Kerdikashvili | C-1 200 m | 49.188 | 3 F | Bye | | 50.502 | 6 |
| Lidia Sulaberidze | C-1 500 m | —N/a | | | | 2:38.048 | 9 |

== Gymnastics ==
Georgia has entered five male and five female athletes.

=== Men ===
Qualification

| Athlete | Event | Qualification | | | | | | | | Final | | | | | | | |
| Athlete | Event | Apparatus | | | | | | Total | Rank | Apparatus | | | | | | Total | Rank |
| Athlete | Event | F | PH | R | V | PB | HB | Total | Rank | F | PH | R | V | PB | HB | Total | Rank |
|---|---|---|---|---|---|---|---|---|---|---|---|---|---|---|---|---|---|
| Saba Abesadze | Team | 11.600 | 11.500 | 13.033 | 12.866 | 13.166 | 11.066 | 73.231 | 58 | Did not advance | | | | | | | |
| Valiko Duduchava | Team | 11.833 | —N/a | | 13.033 | —N/a | | | | Did not advance | | | | | | | |
| Ioane Jimsheleishvili | Team | 13.700 | 9.666 | 12.933 | 14.000 | 11.133 | 7.100 | 68.532 | 73 | Did not advance | | | | | | | |
| Bidzina Sitchinava | Team | 12.833 | 11.366 | 12.766 | 13.233 | 12.633 | 10.633 | 73.464 | 57 | Did not advance | | | | | | | |
| Levan Skhiladze | Team | —N/a | 12.700 | 13.500 | —N/a | 11.233 | 12.433 | —N/a | | Did not advance | | | | | | | |
| Total | Team | 38.366 | 35.566 | 39.466 | 40.266 | 37.032 | 34.132 | 224.828 | 25 | Did not advance | | | | | | | |

=== Women ===
Qualification

| Athlete | Qualification | | | | | |
| Athlete | Apparatus | | | | Total | Rank |
| Athlete | V | UB | BB | F | Total | Rank |
|---|---|---|---|---|---|---|
| Ani Gobadze | 11.366 | 9.433 | 10.033 | 10.166 | 40.998 | 81 |
