= Cyprus at the 2018 European Championships =

- IOC code: CYP

in (United Kingdom) Glasgow (Germany) Berlin 2 August 2018 – 12 August 2018
- Competitors: 19 in 3 sports
- Medals: Gold 0 Silver 0 Bronze 0 Total 0

European Championships appearances
- 2018; 2022

Cyprus competed at the inaugural 7 sports 2018 European Championships from 2 to 12 August 2018. It competed in 3 sports.

== Aquatics ==
=== Swimming ===
Women

Athlete	Event	Heats		Semifinal		Final	
Athlete	Event	Result	Rank	Result	Rank	Result	Rank
Kalia Antoniou	50 metre freestyle	26.02	34	did not advance			
Kalia Antoniou	100 metre freestyle	57.12	37	did not advance			
Kalia Antoniou	50 metre backstroke	DSQ		did not advance			
Alexandra Schegoleva	50 metre butterfly	28.10	35	did not advance			
Alexandra Schegoleva	100 metre butterfly	1:03.53	36	did not advance			
Alexandra Schegoleva	200 metre breaststroke	2:38.65	32	did not advance			

== Athletics ==
Men
Track and road

Athlete	Event	Heats		Semifinal		Final	
Athlete	Event	Result	Rank	Result	Rank	Result	Rank
Paisios Dimitriades	200 metres	21.31	27	did not advance			
Christos Demetriou	800 metres	1:50.62	31	did not advance			
Amine Khadiri	1500 metres	3:45.97	19	—		did not advance	
Milan Trajković	110 metres hurdles	Bye		13.57	15	did not advance	

Field events

Athletes	Event	Qualification		Final	
Athletes	Event	Distance	Position	Distance	Position
Vasilios Constantinou	High jump	2.11	26	did not advance	
Nikandros Stylianou	Pole vault	5.36	22	did not advance	
Apostolos Parellis	Discus throw	62.32	10 q	63.62 SB	8

Women
Track and road

Athlete	Event	Heats		Semifinal		Final	
Athlete	Event	Result	Rank	Result	Rank	Result	Rank
Olivia Fotopoulou	100 metres	DQ		did not advance			
Natalia Evangelidou	800 metres	2:03.38	21	did not advance			
Natalia Evangelidou	1500 metres	4:25.91	24	—		did not advance	
Natalia Christofi	100 metres hurdles	13.53	18	did not advance			

Field events

Athletes	Event	Qualification		Final	
Athletes	Event	Distance	Position	Distance	Position
Nektaria Panagi	Long jump	6.62	11 q	6.29	11

== Gymnastics ==
=== Men ===
Team

Athlete	Event	Qualification								Final							
Athlete	Event	Apparatus						Total	Rank	Apparatus						Total	Rank
Athlete	Event	F	PH	R	V	PB	HB	Total	Rank	F	PH	R	V	PB	HB	Total	Rank
Ilias Georgiou	Team	12.466	12.666	13.500	13.233	13.700	12.633	—									
Marios Georgiou	Team	13.633	13.033	14.000	13.966	13.266	12.233	—									
Michalis Krasias	Team	—	12.666	11.233	—	9.566	10.400	—									
Neofytos Kyriakou	Team	12.766	—		13.500	—		—									
Total	Team	38.865	38.365	38.733	40.699	36.532	35.266	228.460	20	—							

=== Women ===
Qualification

Athlete	Qualification			
Athlete	Apparatus			
Athlete	V	UB	BB	F
Gloria Philassides	—	9.733	10.100	11.766
Anastasia Theocharous	10.883	9.766	11.533	12.000
