= Kyle Evans =

British BMX rider

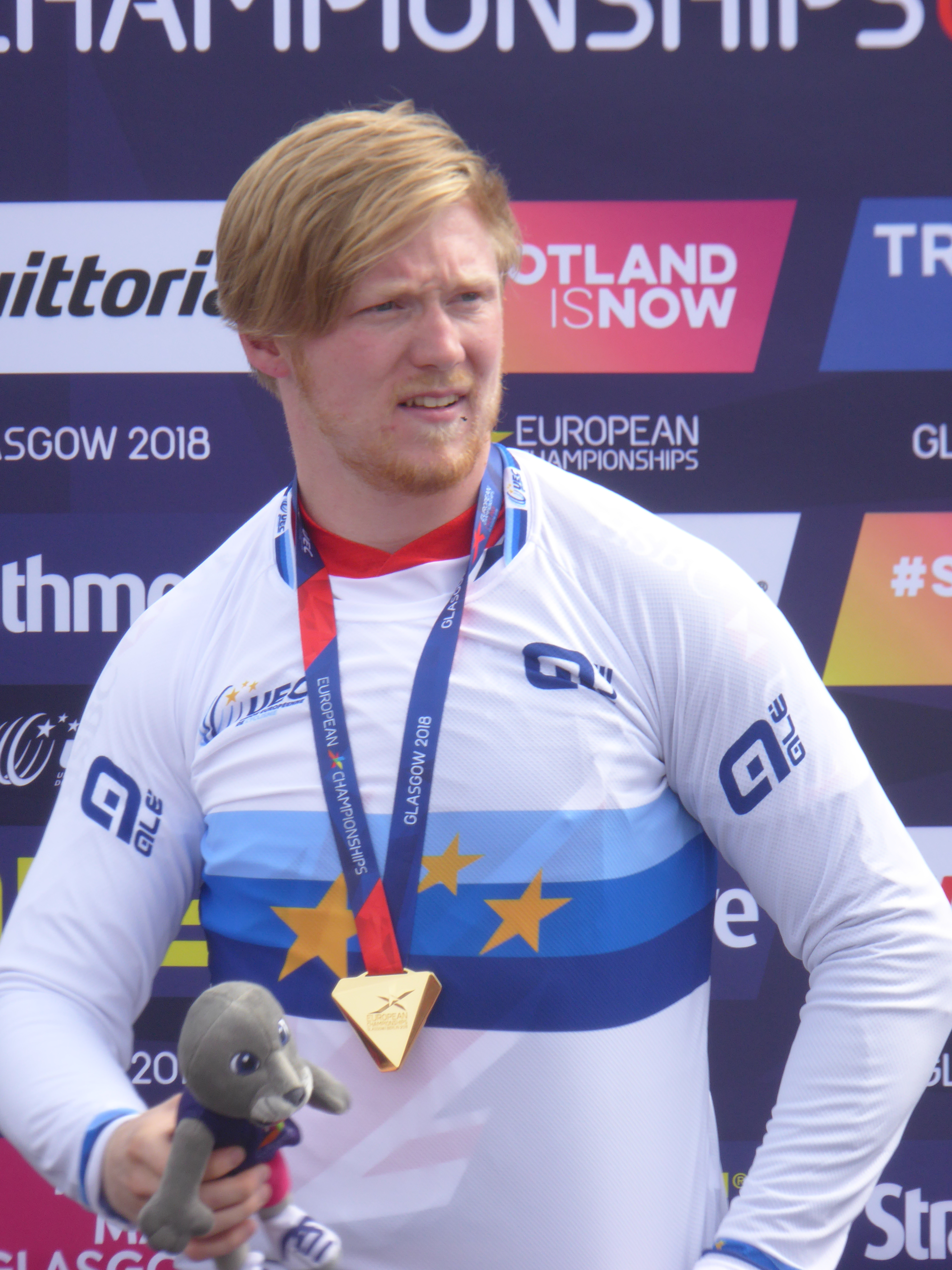
- Evans at the 2018 European BMX Championships

Personal information
- Born: 26 September 1993 (age 33)
- Height: 1.80 m (5 ft 11 in)
- Weight: 81 kg (179 lb)

Cycling career
- Sport: Cycling
- Current team: Retired
- Discipline: BMX racing
- Role: Rider
Medal record
European Championships
Gold medal – first place	2018 Glasgow	Men's BMX

Kyle Evans (born 26 September 1993) is a British former BMX rider from Hindley, Greater Manchester, who represented Great Britain in international competitions. He competed in the men's time trial event at the 2015 UCI BMX World Championships.

Evans was selected for the British cycling team at the 2016 Summer Olympics in Rio de Janeiro, competing in the men's BMX race. After grabbing a twenty-first seed in the opening round with a time of 35.776, Evans scored a total of 19 placing points to take the penultimate spot against seven other riders in his quarter-final heat. He was thus eliminated from the tournament. Evans made an appearance on the ‘Question of Sport’ episode that aired on 14 November 2018. Having retired from BMX racing in 2020, Evans acted as a batonbearer for the 2022 Commonwealth Games Queen's Baton Relay when the baton came to Kidsgrove.
