= 2018 European Mountain Bike Championships =

- Venue: Glasgow United Kingdom
- Date(s): 8 August 2018
- Coordinates: 55°51′40″N 04°15′00″W
- Events: 2

The 2018 European Mountain Bike Championships was held in Glasgow, United Kingdom, on 8 August 2018, the championships are part of the first European Championships with other six sports events happening in Glasgow and Berlin.

In 2018 for the first time the European championships of four cycling specialties (Road, Track, BMX and Mountain bike), were held in a single period and a single venue, and the events were part of the program of the first edition of the European Championships.

== Events ==
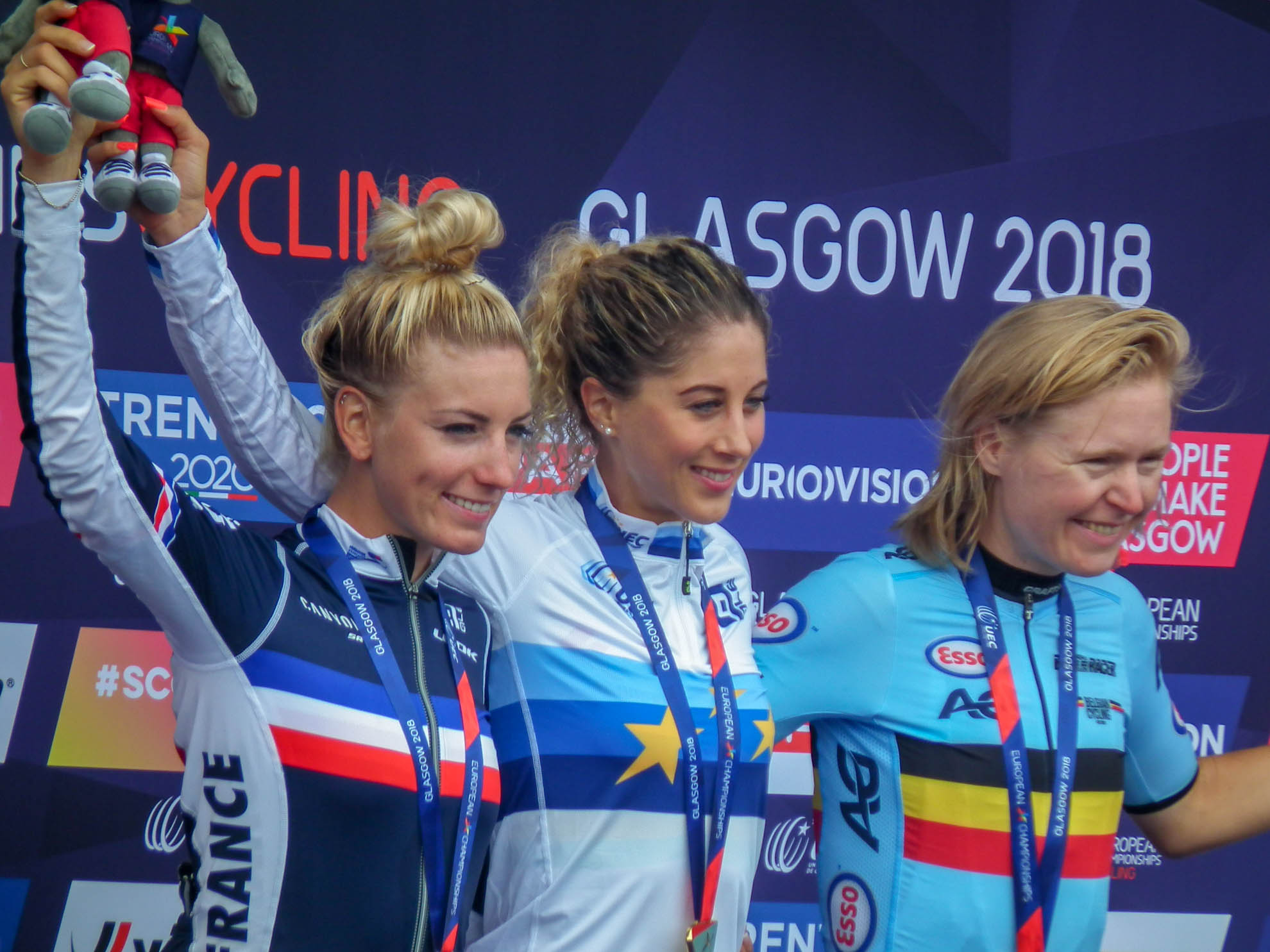
Women's podium

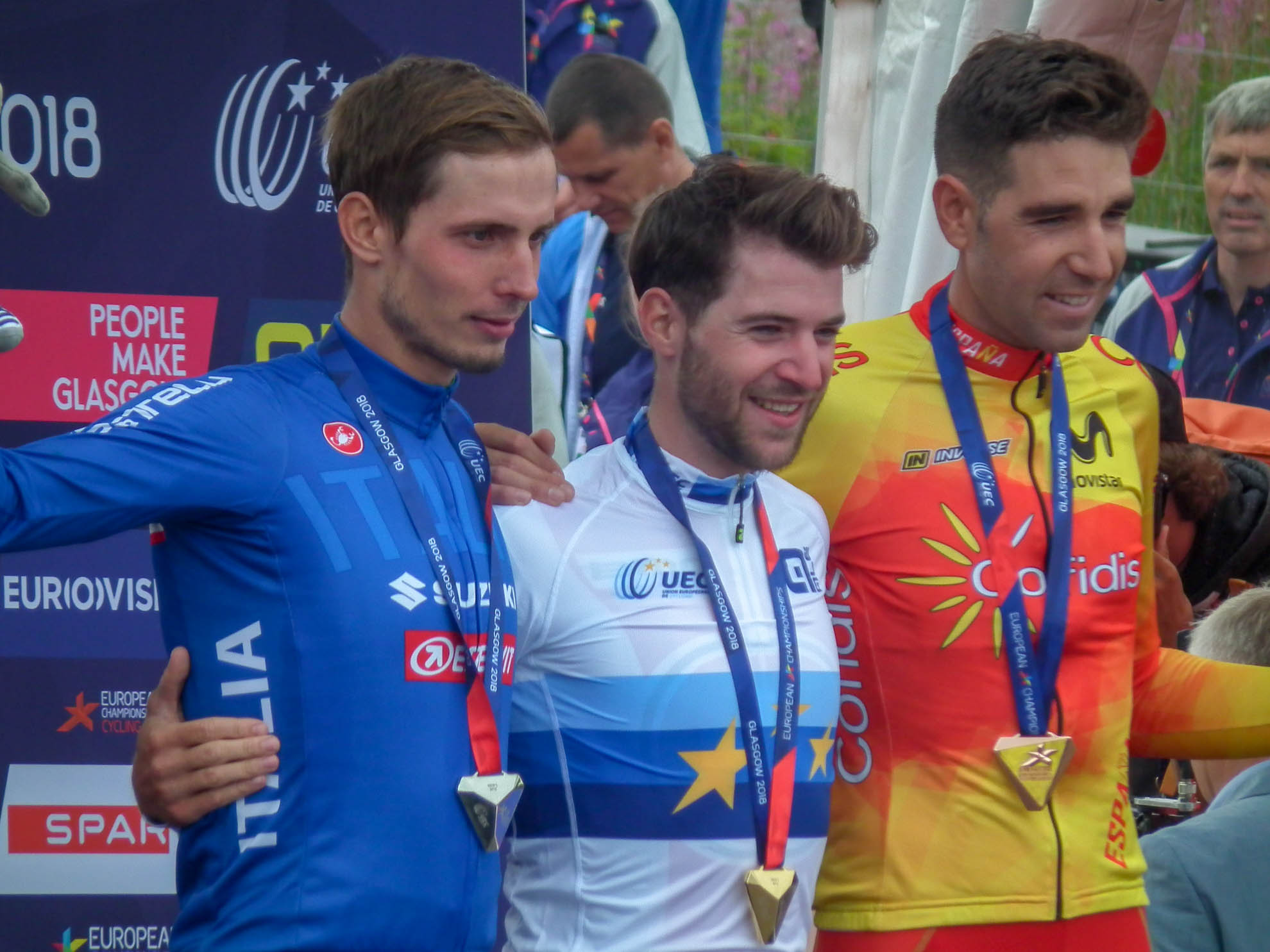
Men's podium

| Event | Gold | Silver | Bronze |
|---|---|---|---|
Men's Events
| Cross-country | Lars Förster; Switzerland | Luca Braidot; Italy | David Valero; Spain |
Women's Events
| Cross-country | Jolanda Neff; Switzerland | Pauline Ferrand-Prévot; France | Githa Michiels; Belgium |

== Medal table ==
| Rank | Nation | Gold | Silver | Bronze | Total |
|---|---|---|---|---|---|
| 1 | Switzerland (SUI) | 2 | 0 | 0 | 2 |
| 2 | France (FRA) | 0 | 1 | 0 | 1 |
| 2 | Italy (ITA) | 0 | 1 | 0 | 1 |
| 4 | Belgium (BEL) | 0 | 0 | 1 | 1 |
| 4 | Spain (ESP) | 0 | 0 | 1 | 1 |
| Totals (5 entries) | | 2 | 2 | 2 | 6 |

== See also ==
- 2018 European Cycling Championships
