= Serbia at the 2022 European Championships =

in (Germany) Munich 11 August 2022 – 22 August 2022
- Competitors: 51 in 8 sports
- Medals Ranked 26th: Gold 1 Silver 2 Bronze 1 Total 4

European Championships appearances
- 2018; 2022

Serbia competed at the 2022 European Championships in Munich from August 11 to August 22, 2022.

== Medallists ==
Medal	Name	Sport	Event	Date
Gold	Ivana Vuleta	Athletics	Women's long jump	18 August
Silver	Armin Sinančević	Athletics	Men's shot put	15 August
Silver	Adriana Vilagoš	Athletics	Women's javelin throw	20 August
Bronze	Angelina Topić	Athletics	Women's high jump	21 August

== Competitors ==
The following is the list of number of competitors in the Championships:

Sport	Men	Women	Total
Athletics	7	7	14
Gymnastics (men and women)	2	0	2
Canoe sprint	14	4	18
Cycling road	1	1	2
Rowing	5	0	5
Sport climbing	0	1	1
Table tennis	4	4	8
Triathlon	1	0	1
Total	34	17	51

== Athletics ==
Serbia entered the following athletes.

Key

- Q = Qualified for the next round
- q = Qualified for the next round as a fastest loser or, in field events, by position without achieving the qualifying target
- NR = National record
- PB = Personal best
- SB = Season best
- N/A = Round not applicable for the event

=== Men ===
Track and road events

Athlete	Event	Heat		Semifinal		Final	
Athlete	Event	Result	Rank	Result	Rank	Result	Rank
Boško Kijanović	400 m	45.75	8 Q	45.88	14	Did not advance	
Elzan Bibić	5000 m	—				13:39.60	18
Luka Trgovčević	110 m hurdles	14.01	21	Did not advance			

Field events

Athlete	Event	Qualification		Final	
Athlete	Event	Distance	Position	Distance	Position
Lazar Anić	Long jump	7.86	4 q	7.37	11
Strahinja Jovančević	Long jump	7.34	19	Did not advance	
Armin Sinančević	Shot put	21.82 SB	1 Q	21.39	2nd place, silver medalist(s)
Asmir Kolašinac	Shot put	19.99	11 q	20.15	8

=== Women ===
Track and road events

Athlete	Event	Heat		Semifinal		Final	
Athlete	Event	Result	Rank	Result	Rank	Result	Rank
Milana Tirnanić	100 m	11.57	14 q	DQ		Did not advance	
Anja Lukić	100 m hurdles	13.63	19	Did not advance			

Field events

Athlete	Event	Qualification		Final	
Athlete	Event	Distance	Position	Distance	Position
Angelina Topić	High jump	1.87	1 q	1.93	3rd place, bronze medalist(s)
Milica Gardašević	Long jump	6.83 =PB	3 Q	6.52	7
Ivana Vuleta	Long jump	6.67	4 q	7.06 =SB	1st place, gold medalist(s)
Dragana Tomašević	Discus throw	55.51	20	Did not advance	
Adriana Vilagoš	Javelin throw	57.70	9 q	62.01	2nd place, silver medalist(s)

== Gymnastics ==
Serbia has entered two male athletes.

=== Men ===
Qualification

Athlete	Qualification						Total	Rank
Athlete	Apparatus						Total	Rank
Athlete	F	PH	R	V	PB	HB	Total	Rank
Ivan Dejanović								
Petar Vefić								

== Triathlon ==
Athlete	Event	Swim (1.5 km)	Trans 1	Bike (40 km)	Trans 2	Run (10 km)	Total Time	Rank
Ognjen Stojanović	Men's							
