= Slovenia at the 2022 European Championships =

in (Germany) Munich 11 August 2022 – 22 August 2022
- Competitors: 76 in 11 sports
- Medals Ranked 16th: Gold 3 Silver 5 Bronze 2 Total 10

European Championships appearances
- 2018; 2022

Slovenia competed at the 2022 European Championships in Munich from August 11 to August 22, 2022.

== Medallists ==
Medal	Name	Sport	Event	Date
Gold	Janja Garnbret	Sport climbing	Women's lead	13 August
Gold	Janja Garnbret	Sport climbing	Women's boulder	14 August
Gold	Janja Garnbret	Sport climbing	Women's boulder & lead	17 August
Silver	Luka Potočar	Sport climbing	Men's lead	14 August
Silver	Darko Jorgić	Table tennis	Men's singles	21 August
Silver	Mia Krampl	Sport climbing	Women's boulder & lead	17 August
Silver	Kristjan Čeh	Athletics	Men's discus throw	19 August
Silver	Anja Osterman	Canoeing	Women's K–1 200 metres	20 August
Bronze	Tina Šutej	Athletics	Women's pole vault	16 August
Bronze	Anja Osterman	Canoeing	Women's K–1 500 metres	21 August

== Competitors ==
The following is the list of number of competitors in the Championships:

Sport	Men	Women	Total
Athletics	9	13	22
Beach volleyball	0	2	2
Gymnastics (men and women)	2	5	7
Canoe sprint	2	1	3
Cycling BMX	1	0	1
Cycling mountain bike	1	1	2
Cycling road	8	3	11
Cycling track	1	0	1
Rowing	6	1	7
Sport climbing	7	6	13
Table tennis	4	3	7
Total	41	35	76

== Athletics ==
Slovenia entered the following athletes.

Key

- Q = Qualified for the next round
- q = Qualified for the next round as a fastest loser or, in field events, by position without achieving the qualifying target
- NR = National record
- PB = Personal best
- SB = Season best
- N/A = Round not applicable for the event

=== Men ===
Track and road events

Athlete	Event	Heat		Semifinal		Final	
Athlete	Event	Result	Rank	Result	Rank	Result	Rank
Jan Vukovič	800 m	1:48.88	31	Did not advance			
Matic Ian Guček	400 m hurdles	Bye		49.93	18	Did not advance	
Primož Kobe	Marathon	—				2:29:23	61
Jure Grkman; Lovro Mesec Košir; Matic Ian Guček; Rok Ferlan	4 × 400 m relay	3:03.68 SB	11	—		Did not advance	

Field events

Athlete	Event	Qualification		Final	
Athlete	Event	Distance	Position	Distance	Position
Robert Renner	Pole vault	5.30	20	Did not advance	
Kristjan Čeh	Dscus throw	69.06 CR	1 Q	68.28	2nd place, silver medalist(s)

=== Women ===
Track and road events

Athlete	Event	Heat		Semifinal		Final	
Athlete	Event	Result	Rank	Result	Rank	Result	Rank
Jerneja Smonkar	800 m	2:03.24	16	Did not advance			
Veronika Sadek	800 m	2:04.57	26	Did not advance			
Agata Zupin; Aneja Simončič; Maja Pogorevc; Anita Horvat	4 × 400 m relay	3:31.57	13	—		Did not advance	
Joni Tomičič Prezelj	100 m hurdles	13.68	21	Did not advance			
Agata Zupin	400 m hurdles	57.42	20	Did not advance			
Maruša Mišmaš-Zrimšek	3000 m steeplechase	9:46.06	9 q	—		9:53.81	15

Field events

Athlete	Event	Qualification		Final	
Athlete	Event	Distance	Position	Distance	Position
Lia Apostolovski	High jump	1.87	1 q	1.90	7
Tina Šutej	Pole vault	4.50	1 q	4.75	3rd place, bronze medalist(s)
Neja Filipič	Triple jump	NM		Did not advance	
Martina Ratej	Javelin throw	58.86 SB	7 q	59.36 SB	5

== Beach Volleyball ==
Slovenia has qualified 1 female pair.

Athlete	Event	Preliminary round			Round of 24	Round of 16	Quarterfinals	Semifinals	Final / BM	
Athlete	Event	Opposition Score	Opposition Score	Rank	Opposition Score	Opposition Score	Opposition Score	Opposition Score	Opposition Score	Rank
Tjaša Kotnik; Tajda Lovšin	Women's	Scampoli – Bianchin (ITA)								

== Cycling ==
=== Road ===
Men

Athlete	Event	Time	Rank
Tilen Finkšt	Road race	4:39:14	60
Aljaž Jarc	Road race	4:42:20	107
Luka Mezgec	Road race	4:38:49	6
Domen Novak	Road race	DNF	
David Per	Road race	4:39:14	59
Jaka Primožič	Road race	4:39:07	55
Jan Tratnik	Road race	4:40:34	88
Jan Tratnik	Time trial	28:46.20	13
Matic Žumer	Road race	4:42:20	110
Matic Žumer	Time trial	30:21.15	28

Women

Athlete	Event	Time	Rank
Eugenia Bujak	Time trial	33:30.81	16

== Gymnastics ==
Slovenia has entered two male and five female athletes.

=== Men ===
Qualification

Athlete	Qualification						Total	Rank
Athlete	Apparatus						Total	Rank
Athlete	F	PH	R	V	PB	HB	Total	Rank
Luka Bojanc								
Nikolaj Božić								

=== Women ===
Qualification

Athlete	Event	Qualification						Final					
Athlete	Event	Apparatus				Total	Rank	Apparatus				Total	Rank
Athlete	Event	V	UB	BB	F	Total	Rank	V	UB	BB	F	Total	Rank
Teja Belak	Team											—	
Lucija Hribar	Team											—	
Sara King	Team											—	
Tjaša Kysselef	Team											—	
Zala Trtnik	Team											—	
Total	Team												

== Triathlon ==
Athlete	Event	Swim (300 m)	Trans 1	Bike (6.8 km)	Trans 2	Run (2 km)	Total Group Time	Rank
	Mixed relay							
