= Iceland at the 2018 European Championships =

- IOC code: ISL

in (United Kingdom) Glasgow (Germany) Berlin 2 August 2018 – 12 August 2018
- Competitors: 19 in 6 sports
- Medals Ranked 24th: Gold 1 Silver 1 Bronze 0 Total 2

European Championships appearances
- 2018; 2022

Iceland competed at the inaugural 7 sports 2018 European Championships from 2 to 12 August 2018. It competed in 6 sports.

== Medallists ==
Medal	Name	Sport	Event	Date
Gold	Axel Bóasson; Birgir Hafþórsson; Valdis Þóra Jónsdóttir; Ólafía Þórunn Kristinsdóttir	Golf	Mixed team	11 August
Silver	Axel Bóasson; Birgir Hafþórsson	Golf	Men's team	12 August

== Aquatics ==
=== Swimming ===
Men

Athlete	Event	Heats		Semifinal		Final	
Athlete	Event	Result	Rank	Result	Rank	Result	Rank
Anton Sveinn McKee	100 metre breaststroke	1:00.90	17 Q	1:00.45	13	did not advance	
Predrag Milos	50 metre freestyle	23.21	47	did not advance			

Women

Athlete	Event	Heats		Semifinal		Final	
Athlete	Event	Result	Rank	Result	Rank	Result	Rank
Eygló Ósk Gústafsdóttir	50 metre backstroke	29.93	37	did not advance			
Eygló Ósk Gústafsdóttir	100 metre backstroke	1:03.82	40	did not advance			

== Athletics ==
Men
Field events

Athletes	Event	Qualification		Final	
Athletes	Event	Distance	Position	Distance	Position
Guðni Valur Guðnason	Discus throw	61.36	16	did not advance	
Sindri Hrafn Guðmundsson	Javelin throw	74.91	20	did not advance	

Women
Track and road

Athlete	Event	Heats		Semifinal		Final	
Athlete	Event	Result	Rank	Result	Rank	Result	Rank
Aníta Hinriksdóttir	800 metres	2:02.15	11 q	DQ		did not advance	

Field events

Athletes	Event	Qualification		Final	
Athletes	Event	Distance	Position	Distance	Position
Ásdís Hjálmsdóttir	Javelin throw	58.64	13	did not advance	

== Cycling ==
=== Mountain bike ===
Athlete	Event	Time	Rank
Ingvar Ómarsson	Men's cross-country	1:45:58	46

== Golf ==
Doubles

Team	Event	Group Stage				Semifinal	Final / BM	
Team	Event	Opposition Score	Opposition Score	Opposition Score	Rank	Opposition Score	Opposition Score	Rank
Axel Bóasson; Birgir Hafþórsson	Men's team	Belgium; W 6 & 5	Italy 3 W 2 & 1	Norway; W 2 up	1 Q	Spain 2 W 2 & 1	Spain 1 L 2 up	Silver medal
Valdia Þóra Jónsdóttir; Ólafía Þórunn Kristinsdóttir	Women's team	Great Britain 3 L 5 & 4	Finland; D Halved	Austria; D Halved	3	did not advance		10

Foursome

Athlete	Event	Foursome 1	Foursome 2	Total		
Athlete	Event	Score	Score	Score	Par	Rank
Axel Bóasson; Birgir Hafþórsson; Valdia Þóra Jónsdóttir; Ólafía Þórunn Kristinsdóttir	Mixed team	70	71	141	-3	Gold medal

== Gymnastics ==
=== Men ===
Qualification

Athlete	Qualification					
Athlete	Apparatus					
Athlete	F	PH	R	V	PB	HB
Eyþór Baldursson	12.566	9.133	12.200	—N/a	11.533	11.100
Valgarð Reinhardsson	12.766	12.100	12.533	14.233 Q	11.866	—N/a

Individual finals

Athlete	Event	Apparatus						Rank
Athlete	Event	F	PH	R	V	PB	HB	Rank
Valgarð Reinhardsson	Vault	—N/a			13.466	—N/a		8

=== Women ===
Team

Athlete	Event	Qualification						Final					
Athlete	Event	Apparatus				Total	Rank	Apparatus				Total	Rank
Athlete	Event	V	UB	BB	F	Total	Rank	V	UB	BB	F	Total	Rank
Þelma Aðalsteinsdóttir	Team	12.100	10.433	11.200	11.766	—N/a		did not advance					
Sigriður Bergþorsdóttir	Team	13.100	9.166	9.900	11.200	—N/a		did not advance					
Margrét Kristinsdóttir	Team	—N/a		9.900	11.766	—N/a		did not advance					
Agnes Suto-Tuuha	Team	12.366	11.133	—N/a		—N/a		did not advance					
Total	Team	37.566	30.732	31.000	34.732	134.030	22	did not advance					

== Triathlon ==
Individual

Athlete	Event	Swim (1.5 km)	Trans 1	Bike (40 km)	Trans 2	Run (10 km)	Total Time	Rank
Edda Hannesdóttir	Women's	18:48	1:01	1:05:52	0:34	39:04	2:05:19	20
