= Yaroslava Bondarenko =

Russian cyclist

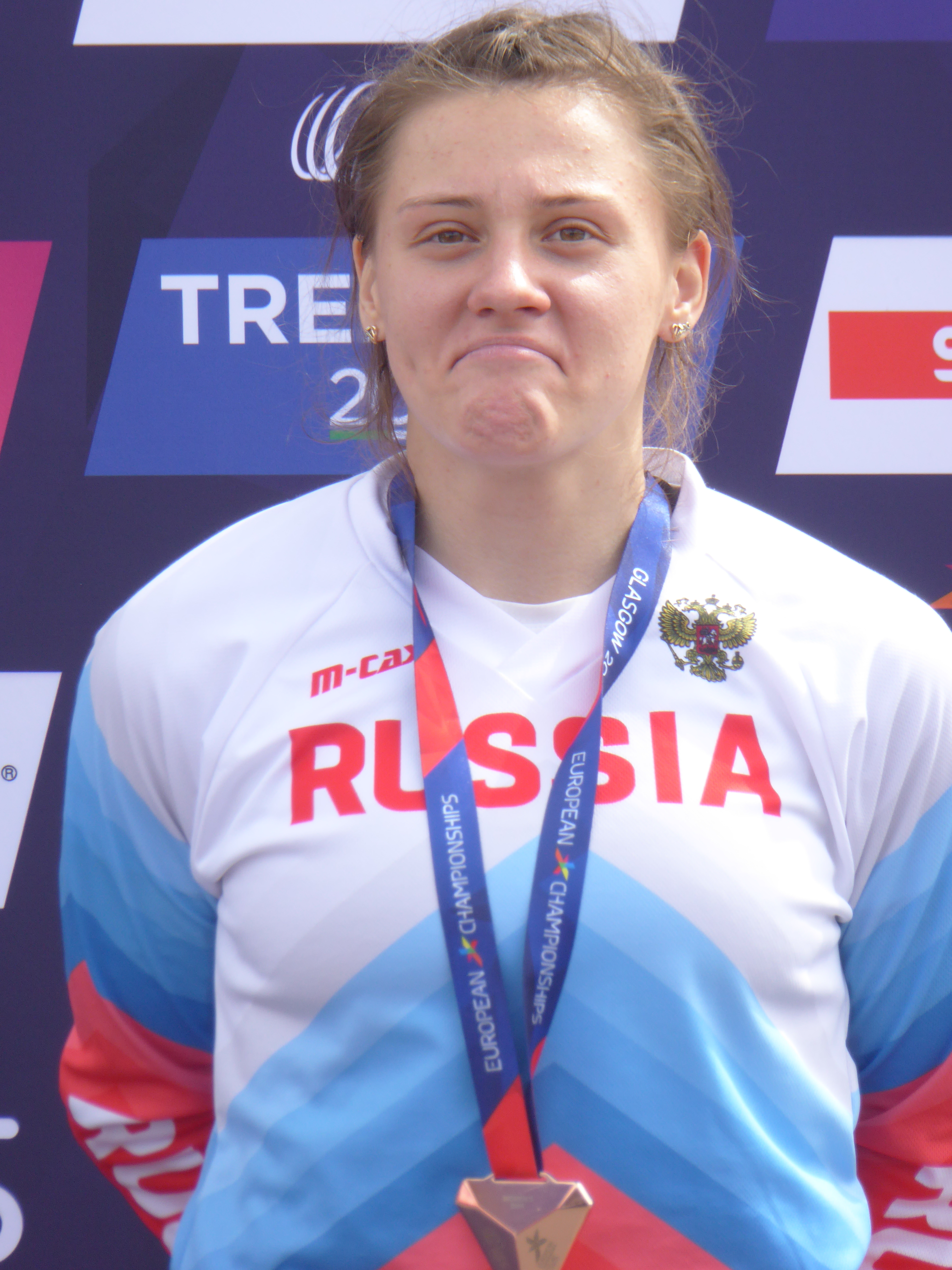
- Bondarenko at the 2018 European BMX Championships

Personal information
- Nationality: Russian
- Born: 27 February 1997 (age 29)
- Height: 1.58 m (5 ft 2 in)
- Weight: 62 kg (137 lb)

Sport
- Country: Russia
- Sport: Cycling
Medal record
Women's BMX racing
Representing Russia
European Championships
Bronze medal – third place	2018 Glasgow	Women's

Yaroslava Aleksandrovna Bondarenko (Russian: Ярослава Александровна Бондаренко; born 27 February 1997) is a Russian cyclist. She represented her country at the 2016 Summer Olympics in BMX. She qualified for the final and finished fifth.
