= 2018 European BMX Championships =

2018 European Mountain Bike Championships
- Host city: Glasgow
- Country: United Kingdom
- Events: 2
- Dates: 10–11 August 2018
- Main venue: Glasgow BMX Centre
- Website: glasgow2018.com

Winter

The 2018 European BMX Championships were held at the Glasgow BMX Centre in Glasgow, United Kingdom, on 10 and 11 August 2018. The championships are part of the first European Championships with other six sports events happening in Glasgow and Berlin.

In 2018, for the first time, the European championships of four cycling events (Road, Track, BMX and Mountain bike) were held in a single period and a single venue, and the events were part of the program of the first edition of the European Championships.

== Events ==
The podiums

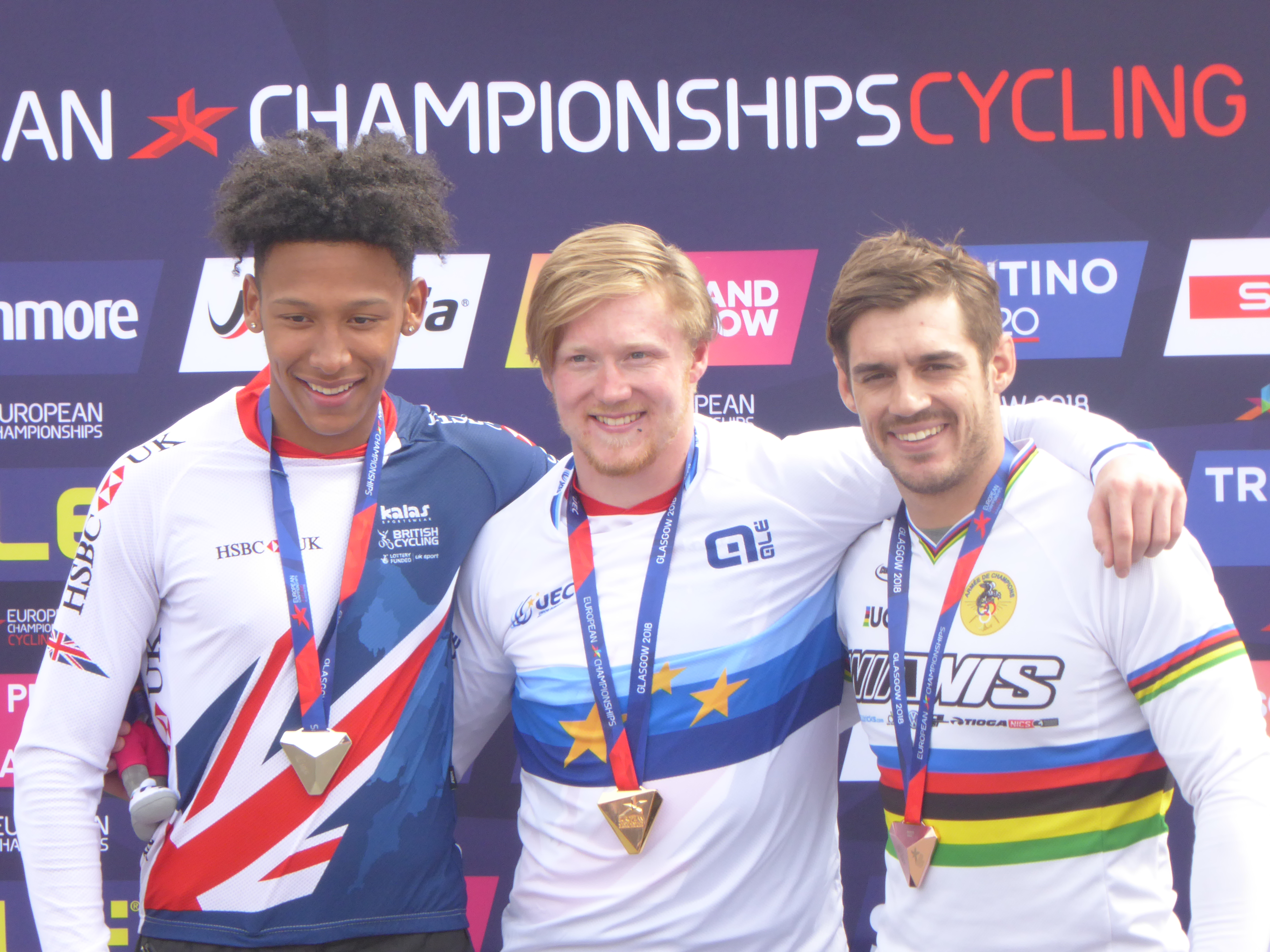
Men's race (from left to right): Kye Whyte (silver), Kyle Evans (gold) and Sylvain André (bronze)

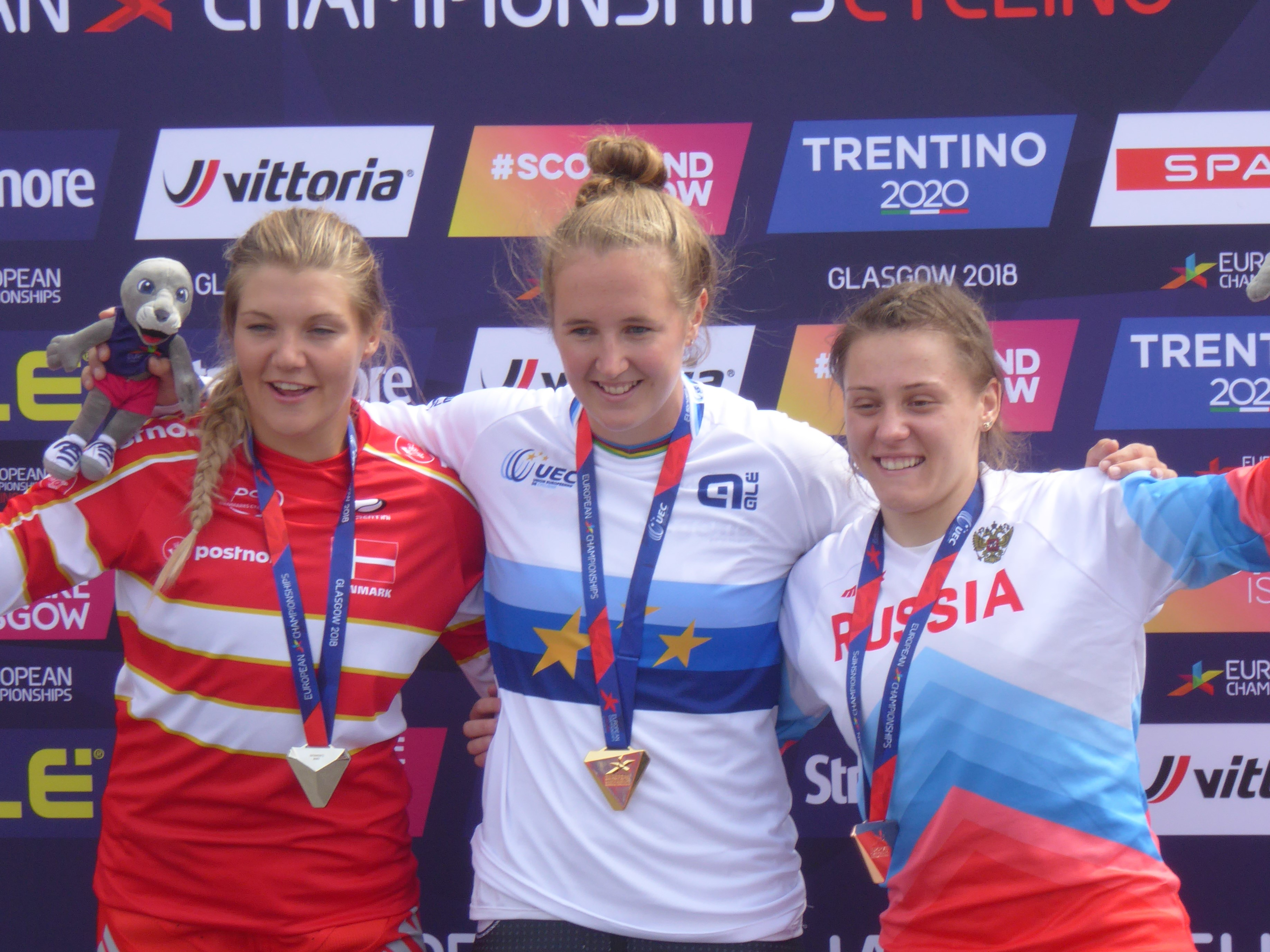
Women's race (from left to right): Simone Christensen (silver), Laura Smulders (gold) and Yaroslava Bondarenko (bronze)

Event	Gold		Silver		Bronze	
Men's	Kyle Evans; Great Britain	34.715	Kye Whyte; Great Britain	35.372	Sylvain André; France	35.458
Women's	Laura Smulders; Netherlands	38.700	Simone Christensen; Denmark	38.965	Yaroslava Bondarenko; Russia	40.067

== Medal table ==
The host country is highlighted in lavender blue

Rank	Nation	Gold	Silver	Bronze	Total
1	Great Britain (GBR)	1	1	0	2
2	Netherlands (NED)	1	0	0	1
3	Denmark (DEN)	0	1	0	1
4	France (FRA)	0	0	1	1
4	Russia (RUS)	0	0	1	1
Totals (5 entries)		2	2	2	6

== See also ==
- 2018 European Cycling Championships
