= 2018 European Championships =

Multi-sports European Championships in Glasgow and Berlin

- Host: Berlin, Germany; Glasgow, Scotland, UK; Edinburgh, Scotland (diving); Gleneagles, Scotland (golf)
- Nations: 53
- Athletes: 3,843
- Sport: 7
- Events: 187
- Dates: 2–12 August
- Website: europeanchampionships.com

The 2018 European Championships were the first edition of the European Championships. It was a multi-sport event which took place in Berlin, Germany, and Glasgow, Scotland, United Kingdom (with Edinburgh hosting the diving events and Gleneagles the golf) from 2 to 12 August 2018. Around 1,500 athletes competed at the European Athletics Championships in Berlin, whilst at the same time more than 3,000 took part in the other championships in Glasgow. Each European Championship was organised by the respective federation and host city.

== Venues ==
Location of the events in Glasgow
Location of the events in Berlin

Most of the events took place in Glasgow and its close surroundings:

- Tollcross International Swimming Centre – swimming
- Loch Lomond – open water swimming
- Scotstoun Sports Campus – synchronised swimming
- Sir Chris Hoy Velodrome – track cycling
- Streets of Glasgow, East Dunbartonshire and Stirling – road cycling
- Cathkin Braes Mountain Bike Trails – mountain biking
- Glasgow BMX Centre (Knightswood) – BMX
- Strathclyde Country Park – rowing and triathlon
- SSE Hydro – artistic gymnastics

Two championships events were hosted at venues in different Scottish cities:

- Royal Commonwealth Pool, Edinburgh – diving
- PGA Centenary Course, Gleneagles – golf

The athletics championships event were held in the second major host city, Berlin:

- Olympiastadion, Berlin – athletics
Logos of the host cities

Glasgow 2018 logo

Berlin 2018 logo

== European Championships Trophy ==
On 1 August, at the "Great Big Opening Party" in Glasgow, a new European Championship Trophy was unveiled, which was awarded to the nation achieving the most gold medals across all seven sports during the Championships. It was presented by Katherine Grainger, Emma Fredh and Angelina Melnikova on behalf of the seven European federations involved in the event. On 12 August, the trophy was presented to the leading nation on the overall table, Russia, in a ceremony in Glasgow.

== List of individual championships ==
The following championships have been brought together in the 2018 European Championships:

- 2018 European Athletics Championships
- 2018 European Aquatics Championships:
  - 2018 European Swimming Championships
  - 2018 European Diving Championships
  - 2018 European Synchronised Swimming Championships
  - 2018 European Open Water Swimming Championships
- 2018 European Cycling Championships:
  - 2018 European Track Cycling Championships
  - 2018 European Road Cycling Championships
  - 2018 European Mountain Bike Championships
  - 2018 European BMX Championships
- 2018 European Golf Team Championships
- 2018 European Artistic Gymnastics Championships:
  - 2018 European Men's Artistic Gymnastics Championships
  - 2018 European Women's Artistic Gymnastics Championships
- 2018 European Rowing Championships
- 2018 European Triathlon Championships

== Participating nations ==
52 nations, plus Authorised Neutral Athletes (Russian athletes competing in the European Athletics Championships under the European Athletics Flag) participated at the European Championships, including:

- Albania (8)
- Andorra (1)
- Armenia (16)
- Austria (84)
- Authorised Neutral Athletes (29)
- Azerbaijan (21)
- Belarus (98)
- Belgium (88)
- Bosnia and Herzegovina (8)
- Bulgaria (32)
- Croatia (44)
- Cyprus (23)
- Czech Republic (114)
- Denmark (68)
- Estonia (47)
- Faroe Islands (FRO) (2)
- Finland (85)
- France (187)
- Georgia (15)
- Germany (247) (hosts)
- Gibraltar (3)
- Great Britain & N.I. (313) (hosts)
- Greece (98)
- Hungary (98)
- Iceland (23)
- Ireland (80)
- Israel (55)
- Italy (236)
- Kosovo (6)
- Latvia (39)
- Liechtenstein (4)
- Lithuania (68)
- Luxembourg (11)
- (North Macedonia) Macedonia (MKD) (2)
- Malta (6)
- Moldova (8)
- Monaco (2)
- Montenegro (4)
- Netherlands (158)
- Norway (75)
- Poland (189)
- Portugal (79)
- Romania (98)
- Russia (172)
- San Marino (8)
- Serbia (33)
- Slovakia (49)
- Slovenia (33)
- Spain (163)
- Sweden (123)
- Switzerland (123)
- Turkey (104)
- Ukraine (163)

== Schedule ==
The original schedule was released in February 2017. The schedule was updated in June 2017 based on the Glasgow ticket schedule and again in March 2018 when the Berlin timetable was released.

| ● | Event competitions | 1 | Number of gold medal events |

| August | | 2 Thu | 3 Fri | 4 Sat | 5 Sun | 6 Mon | 7 Tue | 8 Wed | 9 Thu | 10 Fri | 11 Sat | 12 Sun | Gold medal events |
|---|---|---|---|---|---|---|---|---|---|---|---|---|---|
| Athletics | | | | | | ● | 7 | 5 | 6 | 9 | 11 | 12 | 50 |
| Aquatics | Swimming | | 4 | 6 | 6 | 6 | 6 | 6 | 9 | | | | 72 |
| Aquatics | Diving | | | | | 1 | 2 | 2 | 2 | 2 | 2 | 2 | 72 |
| Aquatics | Synchronised Swimming | | 2 | 1 | 1 | 2 | 3 | | | | | | 72 |
| Aquatics | Open Water Swimming | | | | | | | 2 | 2 | | 1 | 2 | 72 |
| Cycling | Track | ● | 6 | 4 | 4 | 4 | 4 | | | | | | 30 |
| Cycling | Road | | | | 1 | | | 2 | | | | 1 | 30 |
| Cycling | Mountain Bike | | | | | | 2 | | | | | | 30 |
| Cycling | BMX | | | | | | | | | ● | 2 | | 30 |
| Golf | | | | | | | | ● | ● | ● | 1 | 2 | 3 |
| Gymnastics | Men's Artistic Gymnastics | | | | | | | | ● | | 1 | 6 | 12 |
| Gymnastics | Women's Artistic Gymnastics | ● | | 1 | 4 | | | | | | | | 12 |
| Rowing | | ● | ● | 9 | 8 | | | | | | | | 17 |
| Triathlon | | | | | | | | | 1 | 1 | 1 | | 3 |
| Total gold medal events | | | 12 | 21 | 24 | 13 | 24 | 17 | 20 | 12 | 19 | 25 | 187 |
| Cumulative total | | | 12 | 33 | 57 | 70 | 94 | 111 | 131 | 143 | 162 | 187 | 187 |

== Medal table ==
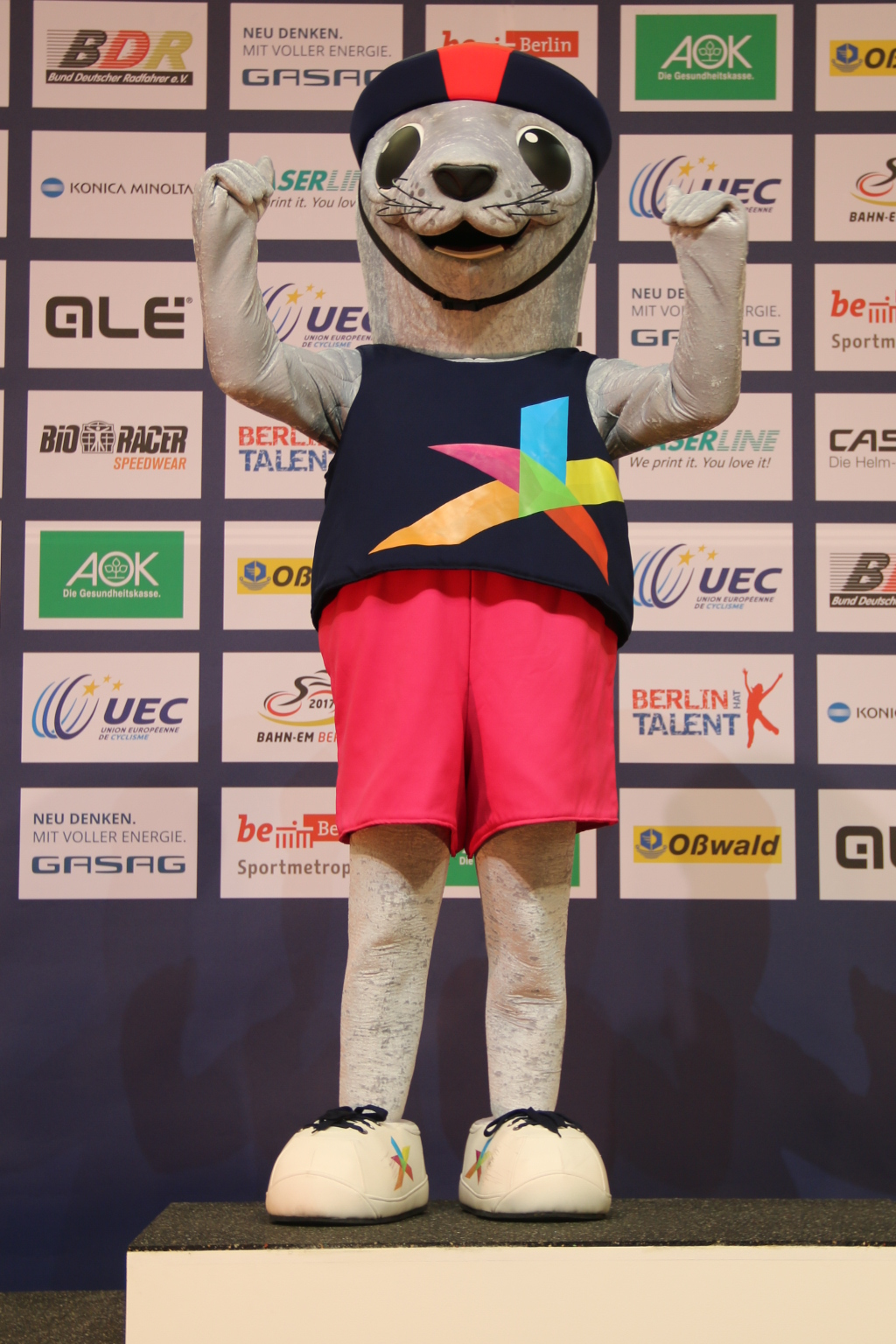
Mascot Bonnie, a female harbour seal

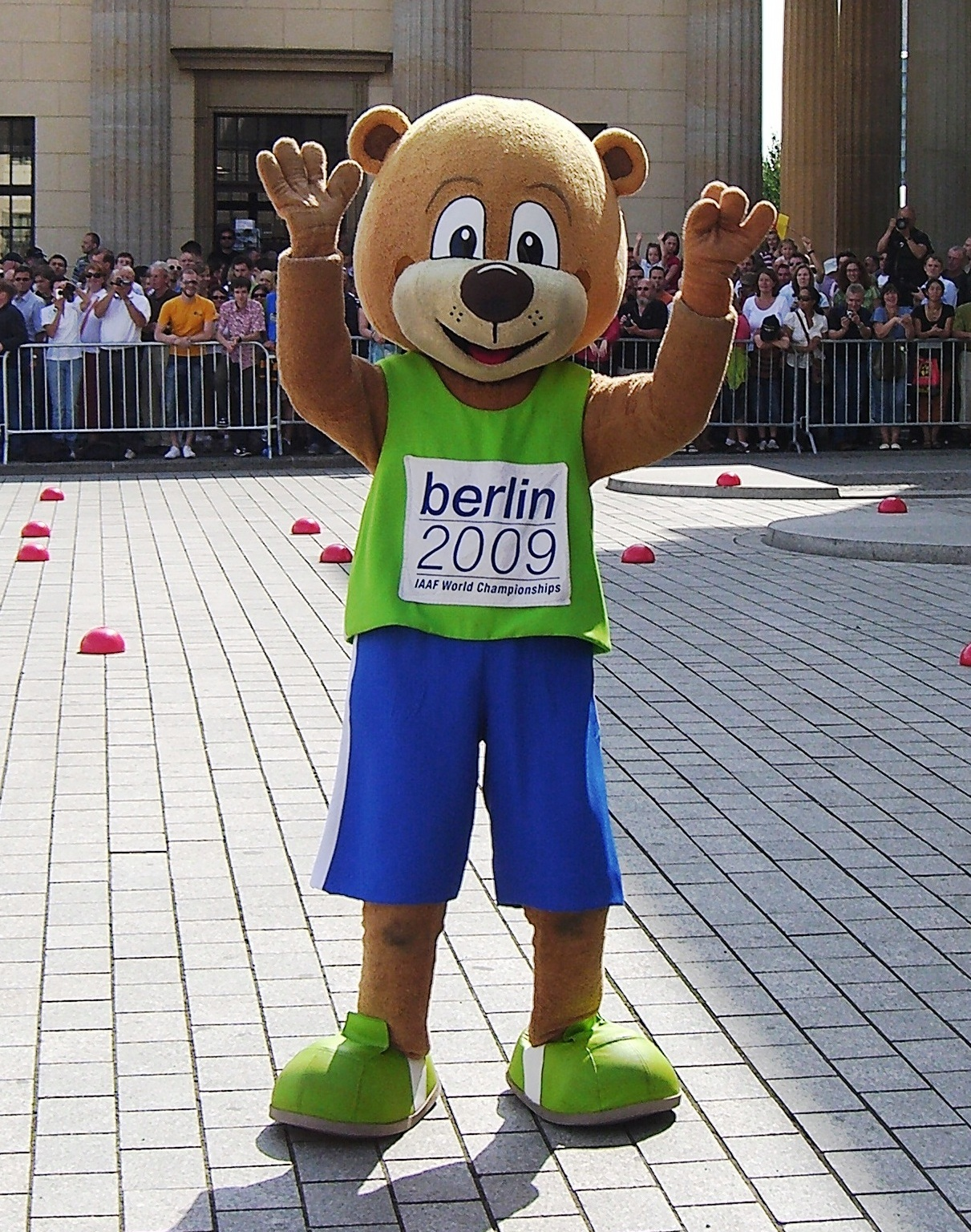
Mascot "Berlino", a bear from the city's coat of arms, first appeared as mascot of the 2009 IAAF World Championships in Athletics

Each sport maintained its own medal table, but an overall medal table is also maintained, the leader of which won the European Championship trophy. Russia won the inaugural trophy and topped the medal table by gold medals won with 31, whilst co-hosts Great Britain topped the total medals table with 74 medals, 26 of which were gold. A chasing pack consisting of Italy, the Netherlands, co-hosts Germany and France each won over 10 gold medals and 40 medals in total.

* Host nation (Host nations: United Kingdom and Germany)

| Rank | Nation | Gold | Silver | Bronze | Total |
|---|---|---|---|---|---|
| 1 | Russia (RUS) | 31 | 19 | 16 | 66 |
| 2 | Great Britain (GBR)* | 26 | 26 | 22 | 74 |
| 3 | Italy (ITA) | 15 | 17 | 28 | 60 |
| 4 | Netherlands (NED) | 15 | 15 | 13 | 43 |
| 5 | Germany (GER)* | 13 | 17 | 24 | 54 |
| 6 | France (FRA) | 13 | 14 | 15 | 42 |
| 7 | Poland (POL) | 9 | 6 | 6 | 21 |
| 8 | Ukraine (UKR) | 8 | 12 | 6 | 26 |
| 9 | Switzerland (SUI) | 8 | 4 | 7 | 19 |
| 10 | Hungary (HUN) | 7 | 4 | 4 | 15 |
| 11 | Belgium (BEL) | 6 | 5 | 8 | 19 |
| 12 | Sweden (SWE) | 6 | 3 | 1 | 10 |
| 13 | Norway (NOR) | 5 | 2 | 1 | 8 |
| 14 | Greece (GRE) | 4 | 3 | 2 | 9 |
| 15 | Belarus (BLR) | 4 | 2 | 3 | 9 |
| 16 | Spain (ESP) | 3 | 7 | 9 | 19 |
| 17 | Romania (ROU) | 3 | 4 | 3 | 10 |
| 18 | Portugal (POR) | 2 | 2 | 0 | 4 |
| 19 | Croatia (CRO) | 2 | 1 | 0 | 3 |
| 20 | Denmark (DEN) | 1 | 4 | 2 | 7 |
| 20 | Lithuania (LTU) | 1 | 4 | 2 | 7 |
| 22 | Turkey (TUR) | 1 | 3 | 2 | 6 |
| – | Authorised Neutral Athletes (ANA)^{[1]} | 1 | 3 | 2 | 6 |
| 23 | Ireland (IRL) | 1 | 1 | 2 | 4 |
| 24 | Iceland (ISL) | 1 | 1 | 0 | 2 |
| 24 | Israel (ISR) | 1 | 1 | 0 | 2 |
| 26 | Czech Republic (CZE) | 0 | 3 | 1 | 4 |
| 27 | Austria (AUT) | 0 | 1 | 3 | 4 |
| 28 | Slovenia (SLO) | 0 | 1 | 1 | 2 |
| 29 | Azerbaijan (AZE) | 0 | 1 | 0 | 1 |
| 29 | Bulgaria (BUL) | 0 | 1 | 0 | 1 |
| 29 | Slovakia (SVK) | 0 | 1 | 0 | 1 |
| 32 | Armenia (ARM) | 0 | 0 | 1 | 1 |
| 32 | Estonia (EST) | 0 | 0 | 1 | 1 |
| 32 | Finland (FIN) | 0 | 0 | 1 | 1 |
| Totals (34 entries) | | 187 | 188 | 186 | 561 |

Notes

^[1] Not included in the official medal table.

In addition, while both the Men's and Women's Gymnastics events included junior competitions in line with previous editions, medals in those competitions are not included within the total.

== Results and standings ==
Official results and standings: ec2018results.com

== Broadcasting ==
All of Europe's major free-to-air broadcasters televised the European Championships in 2018, such as BBC in the United Kingdom, ARD/ZDF in Germany, France Télévisions in France, RAI in Italy and TVE in Spain. Other EBU members who signed up include VRT (Belgium), HRT (Croatia), DR (Denmark), YLE (Finland), RTÉ (Ireland), NOS (Netherlands), NRK (Norway), TVP (Poland), RTP (Portugal), SRG SSR (Switzerland) and SVT (Sweden). The level of coverage was also enhanced by a deal with Eurosport. In total, over 40 EBU members signed agreements as of April 2018. There were discussions with broadcasters in the remaining territories in Europe, plus other global territories like China, Japan and USA.

== Sponsorship ==
Glasgow 2018 had five official partners (People Make Glasgow, Scottish Government, Strathmore Water, Spar & Eurovision) and Berlin 2018 had six official partners (Spar, Le Gruyère, Nike, Toyo Tires, Generali & Eurovision) with another tier of official supporters across the two host cities. Overall over 56 companies signed up to support the inaugural event.
