= 2018 European Road Cycling Championships =

Cycling competition held in Czechia and Scotland

- Venue: Brno, Czech Republic (Under–23 & Junior); Glasgow, United Kingdom (Elite)
- Dates: 12–15 July 2018 (Under–23 & Junior); 5–12 August 2018 (Elite)
- Events: 12

The 2018 European Road Cycling Championships was the 24th edition of the European Road Cycling Championships, and took place from 12 to 15 July 2018 in Brno, Czech Republic for the under-23 and junior events, and from 5 to 9 August 2018 in Glasgow, United Kingdom for the elite events. The event consisted of a total of 6 road races and 6 time trials, regulated by the Union Européenne de Cyclisme (UEC).

The elite portion of the Championships in Glasgow formed a section of both a first unified UEC European Cycling Championships, and the first multi-sport European Championships.

== Elite ==
The podiums for the road races

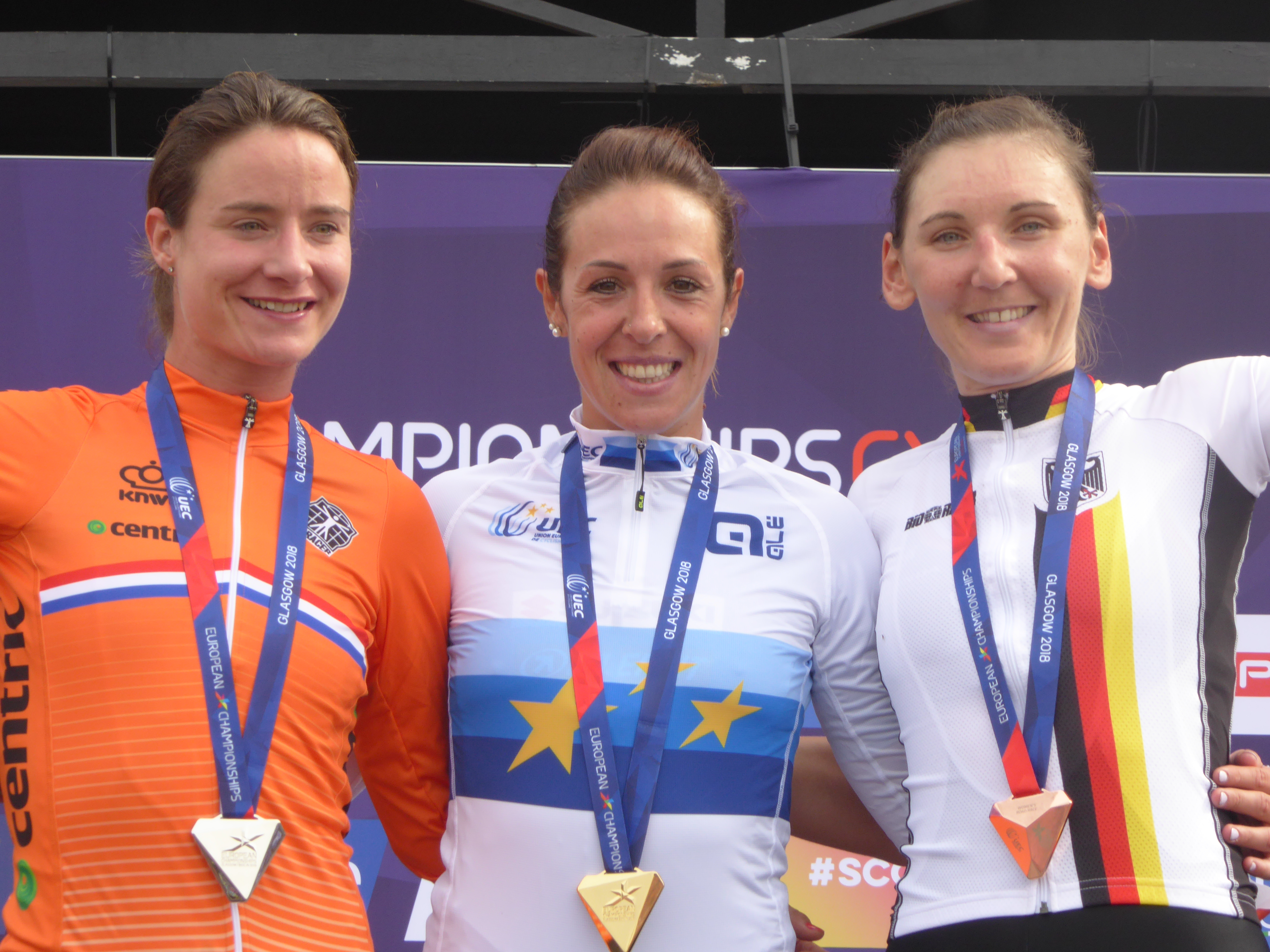
Women's race (from left to right): Marianne Vos (silver), Marta Bastianelli (gold) and Lisa Brennauer (bronze)

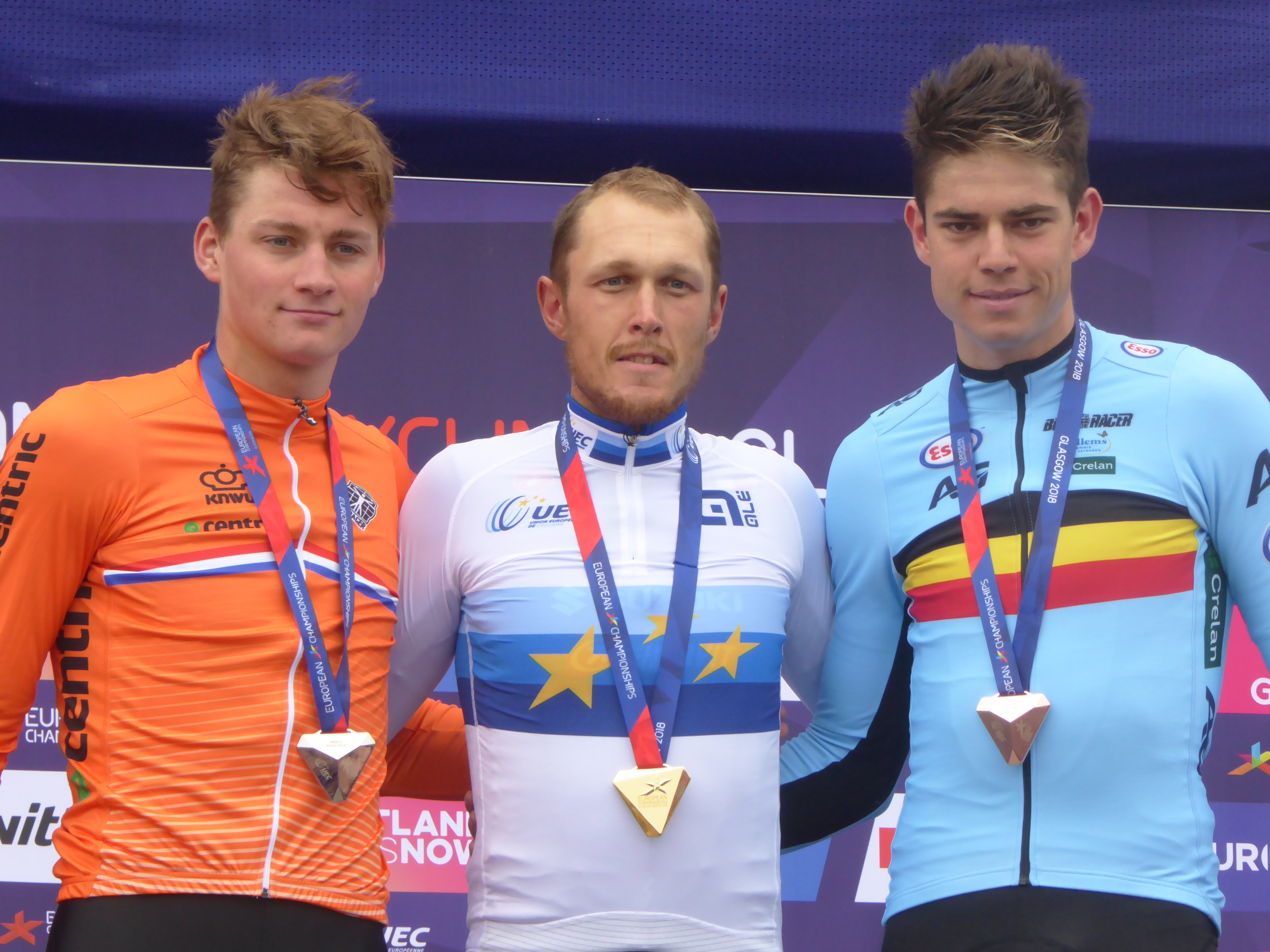
Men's race (from left to right): Mathieu van der Poel (silver), Matteo Trentin (gold) and Wout van Aert (bronze)

Event	Gold		Silver		Bronze	
Men's Elite Events
Road race	Matteo Trentin; Italy	5h 50' 02"	Mathieu van der Poel; Netherlands	+ 0"	Wout van Aert; Belgium	+ 0"
Time trial	Victor Campenaerts; Belgium	53' 38"	Jonathan Castroviejo; Spain	+ 1"	Maximilian Schachmann; Germany	+ 27"
Women's Elite Events
Road race	Marta Bastianelli; Italy	3h 28' 15"	Marianne Vos; Netherlands	+ 0"	Lisa Brennauer; Germany	+ 0"
Time trial	Ellen van Dijk; Netherlands	41' 39"	Anna van der Breggen; Netherlands	+ 2"	Trixi Worrack; Germany	+ 1' 09"

== Medal table ==
Rank	Nation	Gold	Silver	Bronze	Total
1	Italy (ITA)	2	0	0	2
2	Netherlands (NED)	1	3	0	4
3	Belgium (BEL)	1	0	1	2
4	Spain (ESP)	0	1	0	1
5	Germany (GER)	0	0	3	3
Totals (5 entries)		4	4	4	12

== Under 23 ==
Event	Gold		Silver		Bronze	
Men's Under-23 Events
Road race	Marc Hirschi (SWI)	3h 58'14"	Victor Lafay (FRA)	s.t	Fernando Barceló (ESP)	s.t
Time trial	Edoardo Affini (ITA)	29'26"	Izidor Penko (SLO)	+ 26"	Markus Wildauer (AUT)	+ 32"
Women's Under-23 Events
Road race	Nikola Nosková (CZE)	3h 31'47"	Aafke Soet (NED)	+ 3'49"	Letizia Paternoster (ITA)	+ 7'15"
Time trial	Aafke Soet (NED)	33'24"	Lisa Klein (GER)	+ 1'05"	Nikola Nosková (CZE)	+ 1'08"

== Junior ==
Event	Gold		Silver		Bronze	
Road race	Remco Evenepoel (BEL)	3h 15'19"	Alexandre Balmer (SWI)	9'44"	Carlos Rodríguez (ESP)	9"46"
Time trial	Remco Evenepoel (BEL)	29'51"	Ilan Van Wilder (BEL)	+ 24"	Antonio Tiberi (ITA)	+ 40"
Women's Junior Events
Road race	Aigul Gareeva (RUS)	2h 28'29"	Vittoria Guazzini (ITA)	6'01"	Hannah Ludwig (GER)	s.t.
Time trial	Vittoria Guazzini (ITA)	17'00"	Hannah Ludwig (GER)	+ 08"	Marta Jaskulska (POL)	+ 11"

== Overall medal table ==
Rank	Nation	Gold	Silver	Bronze	Total
1	Italy (ITA)	4	1	2	7
2	Belgium (BEL)	3	1	1	5
3	Netherlands (NED)	2	4	0	6
4	Switzerland (SWI)	1	1	0	2
5	Czech Republic (CZE)	1	0	1	2
6	Russia (RUS)	1	0	0	1
7	Germany (GER)	0	2	4	6
8	Spain (ESP)	0	1	2	3
9	France (FRA)	0	1	0	1
9	Slovenia (SLO)	0	1	0	1
11	Austria (AUT)	0	0	1	1
11	Poland (POL)	0	0	1	1
Totals (12 entries)		12	12	12	36
