= Bosnia and Herzegovina at the 2026 European Athletics Championships =

- Flag of Bosnia and Herzegovina
- WA code: BIH

in Birmingham, United Kingdom 10–16 August 2026
- Competitors: 1 (1 man)
- Medals: Gold 0 Silver 0 Bronze 0 Total 0

European Athletics Championships appearances
- 1994; 1998; 2002; 2006; 2010; 2012; 2014; 2016; 2018; 2022; 2024; 2026

Bosnia and Herzegovina competed at the 2026 European Athletics Championships in Birmingham, United Kingdom from 10–16 August 2026.

== Results ==
Bosnia and Herzegovina entered the following athletes.

Key

- Q = Qualified for the next round
- q = Qualified for the next round as a fastest loser or, in field events, by position without achieving the qualifying target
- NR = National record
- PB = Personal best
- SB = Season best
- N/A = Round not applicable for the event

Field events

Athlete	Event	Qualification		Final	
Athlete	Event	Distance	Position	Distance	Position
Mesud Pezer	Men's shot put	18.89	19	Did not advance	
