= Bosnia and Herzegovina at the 2022 European Championships =

in (Germany) Munich 11 August 2022 – 22 August 2022
- Competitors: 8 (5 men and 3 women) in 4 sports
- Medals: Gold 0 Silver 0 Bronze 0 Total 0

European Championships appearances
- 2018; 2022

Bosnia and Herzegovina competed at the 2022 European Championships in Munich from August 11 to August 22, 2022. Bosnia and Herzegovina were represented by 7 competitors in 4 sports.

== Competitors ==
The following is the list of number of competitors in the Championships:

| Sport | Men | Women | Total |
|---|---|---|---|
| Athletics | 2 | 0 | 2 |
| Canoe sprint | 1 | 0 | 1 |
| Cycling road | 1 | 0 | 1 |
| Table tennis | 1 | 3 | 4 |
| Total | 5 | 3 | 8 |

== Athletics ==
Bosnia and Herzegovina entered the following athletes.

Men
Track and road

| Athletes | Event | Heats | | Semifinal | | Final | |
| Athletes | Event | Result | Rank | Result | Rank | Result | Rank |
|---|---|---|---|---|---|---|---|
| Abedin Mujezinović | 800 metres | 1:47.29 | 7 q | 1:50.20 | 16 | did not advance | |
| Amel Tuka | 800 metres | 1:47.73 | 18 | did not advance | | | |

== Canoeing ==
| Athlete | Event | Heats | | Semifinals | | Final | | Overall rank |
| Athlete | Event | Time | Rank | Time | Rank | Time | Rank | Overall rank |
|---|---|---|---|---|---|---|---|---|
| Jasmin Klebic | Men's C-1 200m | 44.069 | 8 | did not advance | | | | 16 |

== Cycling ==
=== Road ===
Men

| Athlete | Event | Time | Rank |
|---|---|---|---|
| Vedad Karic | Road race | DNF | |

== Table tennis ==
Bosnia and Herzegovina entered 1 man and 3 women.

=== Men ===
| Athlete | Event | Qualification stage | | | | Preliminary Round 1 | Preliminary Round 2 | Round of 64 | Round of 32 | Round of 16 | Quarterfinals | Semifinals | Final / BM | |
| Athlete | Event | Opposition Score | Opposition Score | Opposition Score | Rank | Opposition Score | Opposition Score | Opposition Score | Opposition Score | Opposition Score | Opposition Score | Opposition Score | Opposition Score | Rank |
|---|---|---|---|---|---|---|---|---|---|---|---|---|---|---|
| Edin Gutić | Singles | Chiriță (ROU); L 0–3 | Ursu (MDA); L 0–3 | Kojić (CRO); L 0–3 | 4 | Did not advance | | | | | | | | |

=== Women ===
| Athlete | Event | Qualification stage | | | | Preliminary Round 1 | Preliminary Round 2 | Round of 64 | Round of 32 | Round of 16 | Quarterfinals | Semifinals | Final / BM | |
| Athlete | Event | Opposition Score | Opposition Score | Opposition Score | Rank | Opposition Score | Opposition Score | Opposition Score | Opposition Score | Opposition Score | Opposition Score | Opposition Score | Opposition Score | Rank |
|---|---|---|---|---|---|---|---|---|---|---|---|---|---|---|
| Džana Biogradlić | Singles | Partyka (POL); L 0–3 | Munne (ESP); W 3–2 | Toliou (GRE); L 0–3 | 3 | Did not advance | | | | | | | | |
| Marija Gnjatić | Singles | Yılmaz (TUR); L 0–3 | Chiriacova (MDA); L 1–3 | Schreiner (GER); L 0–3 | 4 | Did not advance | | | | | | | | |
| Harisa Mešetović | Singles | Tomanovská (CZE); L 0–3 | Zeqiri (KOS); W 3–2 | Bergand (SWE); L 0–3 | 3 | Did not advance | | | | | | | | |
| Džana Biogradlić; Marija Gnjatić | Doubles | — | | | | Matos (POR) / Pinto (POR); L 0-3 (4-11, 3-11, 7-11) | Did not advance | | | | | | | 33 |
| Harisa Mešetović; Foteini Meletie (CYP) | Doubles | — | | | | Yovkova (BUL) / Trifonova (BUL); L 0-3 (6-11, 3-11, 6-11) | Did not advance | | | | | | | 33 |

=== Mixed ===
| Athlete | Event | Preliminary Round 1 | Preliminary Round 2 | Round of 32 | Round of 16 | Quarterfinals | Semifinals | Final / BM | |
| Athlete | Event | Opposition Score | Opposition Score | Opposition Score | Opposition Score | Opposition Score | Opposition Score | Opposition Score | Rank |
|---|---|---|---|---|---|---|---|---|---|
| Edin Gutić; Harisa Mesetović | Doubles | Andersen (DEN) / Matos (POR); L 1-3 (6-11, 11-6, 8-11, 4-11) | did not advance | | | | | | 49 |
| Federico Giardi (SMR); Džana Biogradlić | Doubles | Alexandrov (BUL) / Trifonova (BUL); L 0-3 (8-11, 10-12, 3-11) | did not advance | | | | | | 49 |
