= Athletics at the 2025 Summer World University Games – Men's shot put =

Men's shot put at the 2025 Summer World University Games
- Venue: Lohrheidestadion
- Location: Bochum, Germany
- Dates: 23 July (qualification); 24 July (final)
- Competitors: 25 from 20 nations
- Winning distance: 20.25 m

Medalists
gold medal	Aiden Smith	South Africa
silver medal	Xing Jialiang	China
bronze medal	Riccardo Ferrara	Italy

The men's shot put event at the 2025 Summer World University Games was held in Bochum, Germany, at Lohrheidestadion on 23 and 24 July.

== Records ==
Prior to the competition, the records were as follows:

Record	Athlete (nation)	Distance (m)	Location	Date
Games record	Konrad Bukowiecki (POL)	21.54 m	Naples, Italy	8 July 2019

== Results ==
=== Qualification ===
All athletes over 19.50 m (Q) or at least the 12 best performers (q) advance to the final.

==== Group A ====
Place	Athlete	Nation	#1	#2	#3	Result	Notes
1	Xing Jialiang	China	18.86	19.38	-	19.38 m	q
2	Aiden Smith	South Africa	18.79	18.26	19.33	19.33 m	q
3	Jason Swarens	United States	18.06	19.18	x	19.18 m	q
4	Gill Samardeep Singh	India	19.10	18.91	x	19.10 m	q
5	Kevin Reim	Germany	17.66	18.26	18.43	18.43 m	q
6	Bjorn van Kins	Netherlands	x	x	17.92	17.92 m	
7	Alexander Kolesnikoff	Australia	17.36	17.85	x	17.85 m	
8	Jonah Chang Anak Rigan	Malaysia	17.57	17.75	x	17.75 m	
9	Balázs Tóth	Hungary	17.53	17.08	17.21	17.53 m	
10	Fatih Alpaslan	Turkey	17.26	17.14	16.86	17.26 m	
11	Wesley Eze	Canada	13.77	x	16.19	16.19 m	
12	Andres David Ayazo	Colombia	11.87	11.45	11.08	11.87 m	
—	Motaz el Gohary	Egypt	x	x	x	NM	

==== Group B ====
Place	Athlete	Nation	#1	#2	#3	Result	Notes
1	Tizian Lauria	Germany	x	18.84	19.09	19.09 m	q
2	Dylan Targgart	United States	18.89	18.97	x	18.97 m	q
3	Riccardo Ferrara	Italy	18.88	18.65	18.57	18.88 m	q
4	Nick Palmer	New Zealand	x	x	18.43	18.43 m	q
5	Piotr Goździewicz	Poland	18.25	18.10	18.42	18.42 m	q
6	Jephté Vogel	Switzerland	17.90	18.40	17.80	18.40 m	q
7	Ali Peker	Turkey	17.77	x	18.14	18.14 m	q
8	Mauricio MacHry	Brazil	17.22	16.65	17.78	17.78 m	
9	Arttu Korkeasalo	Finland	17.31	x	17.02	17.31 m	
10	Arthur Stanat	Canada	17.25	17.14	17.09	17.25 m	
11	Sawan	India	15.99	x	17.03	17.03 m	
12	Ralfs Gauja	Latvia	15.77	x	16.43	16.43 m	

=== Final ===
Place	Athlete	Nation	#1	#2	#3	#4	#5	#6	Result	Notes
1st place, gold medalist(s)	Aiden Smith	South Africa	18.61	x	19.23	18.71	x	20.25	20.25 m	
2nd place, silver medalist(s)	Xing Jialiang	China	18.53	19.28	19.55	19.12	20.08	18.04	20.08 m	
3rd place, bronze medalist(s)	Riccardo Ferrara	Italy	19.40	19.48	19.27	19.91	x	19.52	19.91 m	
4	Nick Palmer	New Zealand	x	17.83	19.71	19.16	x	19.14	19.71 m	
5	Tizian Lauria	Germany	18.87	19.48	19.28	19.32	19.24	19.66	19.66 m	
6	Gill Samardeep Singh	India	18.53	19.16	18.68	x	x	x	19.16 m	
7	Jephté Vogel	Switzerland	18.27	19.06	x	x	18.01	x	19.06 m	
8	Jason Swarens	United States	17.52	18.55	18.74	x	x	x	18.74 m	
9	Ali Peker	Turkey	18.63	17.95	x				18.63 m	
10	Kevin Reim	Germany	17.99	18.34	x				18.34 m	
11	Dylan Targgart	United States	x	17.82	x				17.82 m	
12	Piotr Goździewicz	Poland	x	17.80	x				17.80 m	
