= 2023 European Athletics U23 Championships – Men's shot put =

Men's shot put at the 2023 European Athletics U23 Championships
- Venue: Leppävaara Stadium
- Location: Espoo, Finland
- Dates: 15 July
- Competitors: 15 from 12 nations
- Winning distance: 19.80 m

Medalists
gold medal	Tizian Lauria	Germany
silver medal	Eric Maihöfer	Germany
bronze medal	Muhamet Ramadani	Kosovo

The men's shot put event at the 2023 European Athletics U23 Championships was held in Espoo, Finland, at Leppävaara Stadium on 15 July.

== Records ==
Prior to the competition, the records were as follows:

European U23 record	Konrad Bukowiecki (POL)	22.25 m	Chorzów, Poland	14 September 2019
Championship U23 record	Konrad Bukowiecki (POL)	21.59 m	Bydgoszcz, Poland	14 July 2017

== Results ==
Rank	Name	Nationality	#1	#2	#3	#4	#5	#6	Result	Notes
1st place, gold medalist(s)	Tizian Lauria	Germany	18.94	18.70	19.00	19.80	x	19.37	19.80	PB
2nd place, silver medalist(s)	Eric Maihöfer	Germany	x	18.94	19.44	19.23	18.95	x	19.44	SB
3rd place, bronze medalist(s)	Muhamet Ramadani	Kosovo	18.45	x	19.20	18.73	18.96	18.60	19.20	
4	Xaver Hastenrath	Germany	18.96	18.94	19.19	19.10	18.75	x	19.19	
5	Miguel Gómez	Spain	19.17	x	x	18.71	18.66	x	19.17	
6	Piotr Goździewicz	Poland	18.72	x	x	x	18.19	18.17	18.72	
7	Stephen Mailagi	France	17.34	18.67	18.07	x	x	x	18.67	
8	Wojciech Marok	Poland	16.65	18.29	16.57	16.96	17.74	18.42	18.42	
9	Nuh Bolat	Turkey	18.26	x	17.52				18.26	
10	Jesper Ahlin	Sweden	16.56	17.23	18.23				18.23	SB
11	Riccardo Ferrara	Italy	x	17.91	18.17				18.17	
12	Jakub Korejba	Poland	17.69	17.17	17.58				17.69	
13	Dino Tumbul	Serbia	x	17.55	17.11				17.55	
14	Karel Šula	Slovakia	16.04	16.00	15.83				16.04	
15	Athanasios Annivas Oikonomou	Greece	14.25	15.66	x				15.66	
