= Montenegro at the 2010 European Athletics Championships =

Sporting event delegation

Montenegro at the 2012 European Athletics Championships
- WA code: MNE
- National federation: ASCG
- Website: www.ascg.co.me

in Barcelona 27 July-1 August 2010
- Competitors: 2 (2 women) in 2 events
- Medals: Gold 0 Silver 0 Bronze 0 Total 0

European Athletics Championships appearances
- 2006; 2010; 2012; 2014; 2016; 2018; 2022; 2024; 2026

Montenegro was represented by 2 athletes at the 2010 European Athletics Championships held in Barcelona, Spain between 27 July and 1 August 2010.

== Participants ==
Event	Men	Women
Marathon		Slađana Perunović
High Jump		Marija Vuković

== Results ==
2010 Barcelona	Gold	Silver	Bronze	Total
Montenegro (MNE)	0	0	0	0

=== Women ===
Track and road events

Event	Athletes	Final	
Event	Athletes	Result	Rank
Marathon	Slađana Perunović	-	DNF

Field events

Event	Athletes	Qualification		Final	
Event	Athletes	Result	Rank	Result	Rank
High jump	Marija Vuković	1.87	21	Did not advance	
