= Athletics at the 2026 Asian Games – Men's shot put =

Men's shot put at the 2026 Asian Games
- Venue: Mizuho Park Athletic Stadium, Nagoya
- Date: 26 September 2026
- Competitors: 13 from 11 nations
- Winning distance: 20.81 m GR

Medalists
gold medal	Mohammadreza Tayebi	Iran
silver medal	Tajinderpal Singh Toor	India
bronze medal	Mohammed Daoud Tolu	Saudi Arabia

The men's shot put competition at the 2026 Asian Games took place on 26 September 2026 at the Mizuho Park Athletic Stadium in Nagoya, Japan. Mohammadreza Tayebi of Iran won the gold medal with a Games Record throw of 20.81 metres (68.3 ft), while Tajinderpal Singh Toor of India and Mohammed Daoud Tolu of Saudi Arabia won the silver and bronze medals respectively.

== Schedule ==
All times are Japan Standard Time (UTC+09:00)

Schedule
Date	Time	Event
26 September 2026	16:30	Final

== Records ==
Prior to this competition, the existing world, Asian and Games records were as follows.

World Record	Ryan Crouser (USA)	23.56	Los Angeles, United States	26 May 2023
Asian Record	Mohammed Daoud Tolu (KSA)	21.80	Madrid, Spain	20 June 2024
Games Record	Tajinderpal Singh Toor (IND)	20.75	Jakarta, Indonesia	24 August 2018

== Results ==
Rank	Athlete	Attempt						Result	Notes
Rank	Athlete	1	2	3	4	5	6	Result	Notes
1st place, gold medalist(s)	Mohammad Reza Tayebi (IRI)	20.30	20.81	X	20.60	X	20.48	20.81	GR
2nd place, silver medalist(s)	Tajinderpal Singh Toor (IND)	20.06	20.26	19.77	19.71	20.64	X	20.64	
3rd place, bronze medalist(s)	Mohammed Daoud Tolu (KSA)	X	19.22	20.48	19.78	X	19.12	20.48	SB
4	Xing Jialiang (CHN)	19.50	18.80	X	19.22	19.16	19.15	19.50	
5	Hassan Ajami (IRI)	18.61	19.37	X	X	X	X	19.37	
6	Djibrine Ahmat (QAT)	X	18.61	17.59	18.30	18.89	19.00	19.00	
7	Jonah Chang Rigan (MAS)	18.69	X	18.33	X	18.89	X	18.89	
8	Abdelrahman Mahmoud (BRN)	17.63	18.70	X	X	X	X	18.70	
9	Ivan Ivanov (KAZ)	X	18.46	X				18.46	
10	Karanveer Singh (IND)	18.40	X	18.25				18.40	
11	Ma Hau-wei (TPE)	17.26	18.12	X				18.12	
12	Park Si-hoon (KOR)	X	17.97	X				17.97	
13	Sim Samedy (CAM)	15.53	14.78	15.44				15.53	PB
