= Montenegro at the 2018 European Athletics Championships =

- WA code: MNE
- National federation: Athletic Federation of Montenegro
- Website: www.lbfa.be/web/

in Berlin
- Competitors: 4 (2 men and 2 women) in 4 events
- Medals: Gold 0 Silver 0 Bronze 0 Total 0

European Athletics Championships appearances
- 2006; 2010; 2012; 2014; 2016; 2018; 2022; 2024; 2026

Montenegro competed at the 2018 European Athletics Championships in Berlin, Germany, between 7 and 12 August 2018. 2 men and 2 women competed in 4 events.

== Results ==
Men
Field events

Athletes	Event	Qualification		Final	
Athletes	Event	Distance	Position	Distance	Position
Tomaš Đurović	Shot put	19.33	22	did not advance	

Combined events – Decathlon

Athlete	Event	100 m	LJ	SP	HJ	400 m	110H	DT	PV	JT	1500 m	Final	Rank
Darko Pešić	Result	11.68	6.58	14.97	1.90	DNS	did not finish						
Darko Pešić	Points	715	716	788	714	0	did not finish						

Women
Field events

Athletes	Event	Qualification		Final	
Athletes	Event	Distance	Position	Distance	Position
Marija Vuković	High jump	1.81	18	did not advance	
Kristina Rakočević	Discus throw	55.90	13	did not advance	
