= 2024 World Athletics U20 Championships – Men's shot put =

Men's shot put at the 2024 World Athletics U20 Championships
- Venue: Estadio Atlético de la VIDENA
- Dates: 27 August 2024 (qualification & final)
- Competitors: 27 from 21 nations
- Winning distance: 20.76 m

Medalists
gold medal	Jarno van Daalen	Netherlands
silver medal	JL van Rensburg	South Africa
bronze medal	Georg Harpf	Germany

The men's shot put at the 2024 World Athletics U20 Championships was held at the Estadio Atlético de la VIDENA in Lima, Peru on 27 August 2024.

== Records ==
U20 standing records prior to the 2024 World Athletics U20 Championships were as follows:

Record	Athlete & Nationality	Mark	Location	Date
World U20 Record	Jacko Gill (NZL)	23.00	Auckland, New Zealand	18 August 2013
Championship Record	Jacko Gill (NZL)	22.20	Barcelona, Spain	11 July 2012
World U20 Leading	Yannick Rolvink (NED)	21.81	Breda, Netherlands	20 July 2024

== Results ==
=== Qualification ===
The qualification round took place on 27 August, in two groups, with both Group A and B scheduled to start at 11:00. Athletes attaining a mark of at least 19.70 metres (Q) or at least the 12 best performers (q) qualified for the final.

==== Group A ====
Rank	Athlete	Nation	Round			Mark	Notes
Rank	Athlete	Nation	1	2	3	Mark	Notes
1	Georg Harpf	Germany	19.97	20.32		20.32	Q
2	Alexandr Mazur	Moldova	20.11			20.11	Q, NU20R
3	JL van Rensburg	South Africa	20.01			20.01	Q, PB
4	Yannick Rolvink	Netherlands	19.87			19.87	Q
5	Shaiquan Dunn	Jamaica	18.67	19.35	19.53	19.53	q
6	Ge Tingshuo	China	18.50	19.39	19.32	19.39	q
7	Aatu Kangasniemi	Finland	18.64	18.34	18.78	18.78	
8	Dimitrios Antonatos	Greece	18.39	18.59	x	18.59	
9	Park Si-hoon	South Korea	18.26	18.29	x	18.29	
10	Anurag Kaler	India	18.13	17.95	17.54	18.13	
11	Štěpán Resl	Czech Republic	17.33	x	x	17.33	
12	Stanislav Chyrva	Ukraine	16.86	15.65	16.40	16.86	
–	Benjamin Smith	United States	x	x	x	NM	
–	Ali Peker	Turkey	x	x	x	NM	

==== Group B ====
Rank	Athlete	Nation	Round			Mark	Notes
Rank	Athlete	Nation	1	2	3	Mark	Notes
1	Tyler Michelini	United States	x	19.06	19.64	19.64	q
2	Jarno van Daalen	Netherlands	x	19.12	x	19.12	q
3	Emmanuel Ramírez	Cuba	18.84	17.10	19.09	19.09	q
4	Hencu Lamberts	South Africa	17.45	17.53	19.00	19.00	q, PB
5	Blessing Sefo	New Zealand	x	17.76	18.96	18.96	q, PB
6	Husain Al Naser	Kuwait	18.88	18.52	18.77	18.88	q
7	Robert Marchesi-Scott	Australia	18.02	18.43	18.60	18.60	
8	Siddharth Choudhary	India	17.42	18.18	18.40	18.40	
9	Djibrine Ahmat	Qatar	17.98	17.72	17.68	17.98	
10	Alessandro Soares	Brazil	17.36	x	17.88	17.88	
11	Jan Fiala	Czech Republic	17.64	17.44	17.62	17.64	
12	Shaun-Paul Fritzsche	Germany	16.08	x	16.92	16.92	
13	Mirko Campagnolo	Italy	15.87	15.70	x	15.87	

=== Final ===
Rank	Athlete	Nation	Round						Mark	Notes
Rank	Athlete	Nation	1	2	3	4	5	6	Mark	Notes
1st place, gold medalist(s)	Jarno van Daalen	Netherlands	20.76	x	x	20.49	20.26	x	20.76	PB
2nd place, silver medalist(s)	JL van Rensburg	South Africa	19.70	19.56	20.09	19.96	20.27	20.74	20.74	PB
3rd place, bronze medalist(s)	Georg Harpf	Germany	20.15	20.28	x	x	19.88	x	20.28	
4	Alexandr Mazur	Moldova	20.23	20.01	x	x	x	20.19	20.23	NU20R
5	Yannick Rolvink	Netherlands	17.43	19.88	x	x	19.71	x	19.88	
6	Ge Tingshuo	China	18.60	19.26	19.29	18.89	19.67	x	19.67	
7	Tyler Michelini	United States	18.92	18.66	18.76	x	19.64	x	19.64	
8	Husain Al Naser	Kuwait	19.17	x	x	x	x	x	19.17	PB
9	Shaiquan Dunn	Jamaica	x	18.62	18.92				18.92	
10	Emmanuel Ramírez	Cuba	18.42	17.52	17.68				18.42	
11	Hencu Lamberts	South Africa	18.38	18.37	18.37				18.38	
12	Blessing Sefo	New Zealand	x	x	18.30				18.30	
