= Montenegro at the 2022 European Athletics Championships =

- Flag of Montenegro
- WA code: MNE
- National federation: Athletic Federation of Montenegro

in Munich, Germany 15 August 2022 – 21 August 2022
- Competitors: 2 (1 man and 2 women) in 2 events
- Medals Ranked 27th: Gold 0 Silver 1 Bronze 0 Total 1

European Athletics Championships appearances
- 2006; 2010; 2012; 2014; 2016; 2018; 2022; 2024; 2026

Montenegro competed at the 2022 European Athletics Championships in Munich, Germany, between 15 and 21 August 2022

== Medallists ==
Medal	Name	Event	Date
Silver	Marija Vuković	Women's high jump	21 August

== Results ==
Montenegro entered the following athletes.

Key

- Q = Qualified for the next round
- q = Qualified for the next round as a fastest loser or, in field events, by position without achieving the qualifying target
- NR = National record
- PB = Personal best
- SB = Season best
- N/A = Round not applicable for the event

=== Men ===
Field events

Athlete	Event	Qualification		Final	
Athlete	Event	Result	Rank	Result	Rank
Danijel Furtula	Discus throw	59.10	21	did not advance	

=== Women ===
Field events

Athlete	Event	Qualification		Final	
Athlete	Event	Result	Rank	Result	Rank
Marija Vuković	High jump	1.87	1 q	1.95	(silver)
