= 2024 World Athletics U20 Championships – Men's discus throw =

Men's discus throw at the 2024 World Athletics U20 Championships
- Venue: Estadio Atlético de la VIDENA
- Dates: 30 August 2024 (qualification); 31 August 2024 (final)
- Competitors: 30 from 23 nations
- Winning distance: 62.59 m

Medalists
gold medal	Bryce Ruland	United States
silver medal	Jarno van Daalen	Netherlands
bronze medal	Mico Lampinen	Finland

The men's discus throw at the 2024 World Athletics U20 Championships was held at the Estadio Atlético de la VIDENA in Lima, Peru on 30 and 31 August 2024.

== Records ==
U20 standing records prior to the 2024 World Athletics U20 Championships were as follows:

Record	Athlete & Nationality	Mark	Location	Date
World U20 Record	Miká Sosna (GER)	71.37	Schönebeck, Germany	10 June 2022
Championship Record	Mykolas Alekna (LTU)	69.81	Nairobi, Kenya	22 August 2021
World U20 Leading	Shaiquan Dunn (JAM)	65.48	Kingston, Jamaica, Jamaica	22 May 2024

== Results ==
=== Qualification ===
Athletes attaining a mark of at least 60.00 metres (Q) or at least the 12 best performers (q) qualified for the final.

==== Group A ====
Rank	Athlete	Nation	Round			Mark	Notes
Rank	Athlete	Nation	1	2	3	Mark	Notes
1	Juan Marais	South Africa	61.54			61.54	Q
2	Jiang Zehao	China	58.86	60.63		60.63	Q
3	Jarno van Daalen	Netherlands	58.92	57.49	x	58.92	q
4	Mico Lampinen	Finland	56.15	58.63	58.90	58.90	q
5	Roury McCloyen	United States	57.05	x	58.12	58.12	q
6	Alberto Rodrigues	Brazil	56.67	x	x	56.67	
7	Zsombor Dobó	Hungary	56.66	56.48	52.63	56.66	
8	Darcy Giddings	Australia	x	x	56.29	56.29	PB
9	Benjamin Pichler	Austria	x	53.77	55.68	55.68	
10	Štěpán Resl	Czech Republic	43.90	50.30	55.46	55.46	
11	Ole Mehlberg	Germany	54.70	54.10	55.03	55.03	
12	Aleix García	Spain	52.90	54.96	53.89	54.96	
13	Kyriakos Genethli	Cyprus	53.15	x	54.96	54.96	
14	Hendrik Kookmaa	Estonia	51.26	54.15	53.38	54.15	
15	Leonardo Selmani	Italy	50.32	x	x	50.32	
–	Chad Hendricks	Jamaica				DNS	

==== Group B ====
Rank	Athlete	Nation	Round			Mark	Notes
Rank	Athlete	Nation	1	2	3	Mark	Notes
1	Mykhailo Brudin	Ukraine	61.39			61.39	Q
2	Bryce Ruland	United States	59.41	61.11		61.11	Q, PB
3	Michael Badenhorst	South Africa	57.50	x	60.09	60.09	Q, PB
4	Ethan Ayodele	Australia	52.82	59.45	58.05	59.45	q
5	Philipp Schmidli	Switzerland	49.16	58.11	45.97	58.11	q
6	Shaiquan Dunn	Jamaica	57.82	37.68	x	57.82	q
7	Yannick Rolvink	Netherlands	54.21	x	57.63	57.63	q
8	Manu Kankaanniemi	Finland	47.37	56.53	56.07	56.53	
9	Dijibrine Ahmat	Qatar	55.63	53.37	56.00	56.00	
10	Kelson De Carvalho	Germany	52.70	55.37	55.84	55.84	
11	David Jarolímek	Czech Republic	55.71	x	x	55.71	
12	Alan Fell	Chile	x	x	55.20	55.20	
13	Ritik	India	52.25	x	53.79	53.79	
14	Nathan Villegas	Puerto Rico	52.38	x	x	52.38	
–	Juan David Montaño	Colombia	x	x	x	NM	

=== Final ===
Rank	Athlete	Nation	Round						Mark	Notes
Rank	Athlete	Nation	1	2	3	4	5	6	Mark	Notes
1st place, gold medalist(s)	Bryce Ruland	United States	62.59	x	53.50	59.10	62.44	x	62.59	PB
2nd place, silver medalist(s)	Jarno van Daalen	Netherlands	44.42	60.07	60.55	62.22	58.24	x	62.22	PB
3rd place, bronze medalist(s)	Mico Lampinen	Finland	60.76	62.20	60.76	59.97	61.95	x	62.20	PB
4	Mykhailo Brudin	Ukraine	61.69	60.38	61.30	60.03	60.37	x	61.69	
5	Juan Marais	South Africa	58.78	58.88	61.69	x	x	x	61.69	
6	Ethan Ayodele	Australia	60.25	58.18	55.56	61.55	59.18	x	61.55	
7	Shaiquan Dunn	Jamaica	59.52	59.73	57.64	59.79	x	56.22	59.79	
8	Jiang Zehao	China	59.51	x	59.07	x	58.05	59.72	59.72	
9	Roury McCloyen	United States	59.07	57.20	x				59.07	
10	Yannick Rolvink	Netherlands	x	58.89	x				58.89	
11	Michael Badenhorst	South Africa	56.54	58.18	57.40				58.18	
12	Philipp Schmidli	Switzerland	47.57	54.97	50.83				54.97	
