= Montenegro at the 2012 European Athletics Championships =

- WA code: MNE
- National federation: ASCG
- Website: www.ascg.co.me

in Helsinki June 27-July 1, 2012
- Competitors: 3 (2 men and 1 woman) in 3 events
- Medals: Gold 0 Silver 0 Bronze 0 Total 0

European Athletics Championships appearances
- 2006; 2010; 2012; 2014; 2016; 2018; 2022; 2024; 2026

Montenegro competed at the 2012 European Athletics Championships held in Helsinki, Finland, between June 27 to July 1, 2012. 3 competitors, 2 men and 1 woman, took part in 3 events.

== Results ==
=== Men ===
Field events

Event	Athletes	Qualification		Final	
Event	Athletes	Result	Rank	Result	Rank
Long jump	Dragoje Rajković	6.34	31	did not advance	
Discus throw	Danijel Furtula	60.18	19	did not advance	

=== Women ===
Field events

Event	Athletes	Qualification		Final	
Event	Athletes	Result	Rank	Result	Rank
High jump	Marija Vuković	DNS		did not advance	
