= Montenegro at the 2026 European Athletics Championships =

- WA code: MNE
- National federation: Athletic Federation of Montenegro
- Website: www.ascg.co.me

in Birmingham, United Kingdom
- Competitors: 2 (1 man and 1 woman)
- Medals Ranked 25th: Gold 0 Silver 0 Bronze 1 Total 1

European Athletics Championships appearances
- 2006; 2010; 2012; 2014; 2016; 2018; 2022; 2024; 2026

Montenegro competed at the 2026 European Athletics Championships in Birmingham, United Kingdom, between 10 and 16 August 2026. Two athletes (one female and one male) were sent to represent the country.

== Medals ==
Medal	Name	Event	Date
Bronze	Marija Vuković	Women's high jump	15 August

== Results ==
The following athletes are selected to compete by the Athletic Federation of Montenegro.

- including alternates

Key

- Note–Ranks given for track events are within the athlete's heat only
- Q = Qualified by place in Track Events or by standard in Field Events
- q = Qualified by time in Track Events or without standard in Field Events
- qR= Advanced to the next round by referee.
- NR = National record
- CHB = Championship best
- WL = World Leading
- PB = Personal best
- SB = Season's best
- — = Round not applicable for the event
- Bye = Athlete not required to compete in round
- DNF = Did Not Finish (Running or Race Walking Events)
- DNS = Did not start
- DQ = Disqualified
- NM = No Mark (No valid trial recorded in Field Events

Field events

Athlete	Event	Qualification		Final	
Athlete	Event	Distance	Position	Distance	Position
Tomaš Đurović	Men's shot put	17.90	28	Did not advance	
Marija Vuković	Women's high jump	1.91	1 Q		3rd place, bronze medalist(s)
