= Montenegro at the 2016 European Athletics Championships =

- WA code: MNE
- National federation: ASCG
- Website: www.ascg.co.me

in Amsterdam 6-10 July 2016
- Competitors: 4 (2 men and 2 women) in 4 events
- Medals: Gold 0 Silver 0 Bronze 0 Total 0

European Athletics Championships appearances
- 2006; 2010; 2012; 2014; 2016; 2018; 2022; 2024; 2026

Montenegro competed at the 2016 European Athletics Championships in Amsterdam, Netherlands, between 6 and 10 July 2016.

== Results ==
Men

Field Events

Athlete	Event	Qualification		Final	
Athlete	Event	Distance	Rank	Distance	Rank
Danijel Furtula	Discus throw	63.14	15	Did not advance	

Combined events – Decathlon

Athlete	Event	100 m	LJ	SP	HJ	400 m	110H	DT	PV	JT	1500 m	Final	Rank
Darko Pešić	Result	11.31 SB	6.82	14.65	1.86	DNS						DNF	
Darko Pešić	Points	793	771	768	679	—						DNF	

Women

Field Events

Athlete	Event	Qualification		Final	
Athlete	Event	Distance	Rank	Distance	Rank
Marija Vuković	High jump	1.85	=18	Did not advance	
Kristina Rakočević	Discus throw	54.35	21	Did not advance	
