= Mohammed Tolo =

Saudi Arabian shot putter

Personal information
- Full name: Mohammed Daoud Tolo
- Nationality: Saudi Arabian
- Born: 30 March 2001 (age 25)

Sport
- Sport: Track and field
- Event: Shot put

Achievements and titles
- Personal bests: 21.80 m (2024) NR 19.39 m (2020) NU20R
Medal record
Men's athletics
Representing Saudi Arabia
Asian Games
Silver medal – second place	2022 Hangzhou	Shot put
Bronze medal – third place	2026 Aichi–Nagoya	Shot put
Asian Championships
Bronze medal – third place	2025 Gumi	Shot put
Islamic Solidarity Games
Silver medal – second place	2021 Konya	Shot put

Mohammed Tolo (born 30 March 2001) is a Saudi Arabian shot putter. He has represented Saudi Arabia in the men's shot put event at the 2024 Paris Olympics.

== Career ==
In the 2021 Islamic Solidarity Games, he won silver with a throw of 20.12 meters. In the 2022 Asian Games, he won silver with a throw of 20.18 metres.

Mohammed Tolo threw an Asian Record of 21.80 m on June 21, 2024, at the Meeting de Atletismo Madrid, surpassing Tajinderpal Singh Toor's 21.77m throw.
