= JL van Rensburg =

South African athlete (born 2005)

Personal information
- Born: 5 August 2005 (age 21)

Sport
- Sport: Athletics
- Events: Shot put, Discus

Achievements and titles
- Personal bests: Shot put: 19.83m (2026); Discus: 52.76m (2025)
Medal record
Men's athletics
Representing South Africa
World U20 Championships
Silver medal – second place	2024 Lima	Shot put
African U20 Championships
Gold medal – first place	2023 Ndola	Shot put
Silver medal – second place	2023 Ndola	Discus

JL van Rensburg (born 5 August 2005) is a South African shot putter and discus thrower.

== Biography ==
He won gold in the shot put and silver in the discus at the 2023 African U20 Championships in Ndola, Zambia.

He won a silver medal in the shot put at the 2024 World Athletics U20 Championships in Lima, Peru with a personal best throw of 20.74m using 6 kg. In October 2024, he was named Sportsman of the Year by the Eden Sports Council.

On 1 March 2025, he set a new personal best in the shot put of 19.06m at the Big 12 Indoor Championships in Lubbock, Texas, USA. His best distance of 52.76m in the discus throw was achieved on 17 May 2025 at the Big 12 Outdoor Track & Field Championship held in Lawrence, Kansas, USA.

In February 2026, he set a new personal best in the shot put at the Doc Hale Virginia Tech Invitational with 19.83 metres. In June 2026, he qualified for the 2026 NCAA Outdoor Championships.

== Personal life ==
In September 2024 he was recruited to study at Baylor University in the United States, studying mechanical engineering on a scholarship. His brother Walter is also a shot putter, and won the 2025 African U18 Championships title, two years after JL won the African U20 title in Ndola.
