= Bryce Ruland =

American athlete (born 2006)

Personal information
- Born: 26 September 2006 (age 19)

Sport
- Sport: Athletics
- Event: Discus throw

Achievements and titles
- Personal best(s): Discus: 62.59m (Lima, 2024)
Medal record
Men's athletics
Representing United States
World U20 Championships
Gold medal – first place	2024 Lima	Discus

Bryce Ruland (born 26 September 2006) is an American discus thrower. He won the gold medal at the 2024 World Athletics U20 Championships. He currently competes at the University of Iowa. #TheToystore

== Early life ==
He is from Waterford, Wisconsin and attended Waterford Union High School. He would take part in show skiing with the Aquaducks show skiing group, and would be the base for a human pyramid formation. In November 2023, he committed to the University of Iowa.

== Career ==
Bryce won his first National Championship at the age of 13 in 2020 at the AAU Jr Olympics in Satellite Beach Florida with a 1 kg discus throw of 172' 4". He won a second AAU Championship in 2022 with the 1.6 kg discus with a throw of 180' 7".

He is a two time Wisconsin Discus State Champion (2023 & 2024) and currently holds the Wisconsin State Discus Record of 212' 1"

He won the boys' discus throw at the 2023 Nike National Championships in Eugene, Oregon. In 2023 and 2024 he became the WIAA Division 1 state discus champion. In June 2024, he threw 59.41 metres to finish second at the USATF U20 Championships.

In August 2024, competing at the 2024 World Athletics U20 Championships in the Men's discus throw in Lima, Peru, he won the gold medal with a personal best of 62.59 metres. He launched his best throw in the first round and then his 62.44m throw in the sixth round also proved to be the second-farthest throw of the competition.
