= Georg Harpf =

German athlete (born 2005)

Personal information
- Born: 29 September 2005 (age 20)

Sport
- Sport: Athletics
- Event: Shot put

Achievements and titles
- Personal bests: Shot put: 20.46 m (Dortmund, 2026)
Medal record
Men's athletics
Representing Germany
World U20 Championships
Bronze medal – third place	2024 Lima	Shot put
European U18 Championships
Silver medal – second place	2022 Jerusalem	Shot put

Georg Harpf (born 29 September 2005) is a German shot putter. He won the German Indoor Athletics Championships in 2026 and was the bronze medalist at the 2024 World Athletics U20 Championships.

== Biography ==
Harpf competed as a young athlete as a member of MTV Ingolstadt from 2021, before later working with the coach Andreas Bücheler. Harpf won the silver medal in the shot put at the 2022 European Athletics U18 Championships in Jerusalem, Israel. Harpf won the bronze medal in the shot put at the 2024 World Athletics U20 Championships in Lima, Peru, with 20.28m.

In 2025, he placed third in the shot put at the senior German Athletics Championships. In February 2026, Harpf achieved a personal best with the senior shot out of 19.96m whilst competing in Nehvizdy, Czechia. He then won the German Indoor Athletics Championships on 27 February 2026, achieving a new personal best of 20.46 metres, throwing over 20 metres for the first time. In August, he competed at the 2026 European Athletics Championships in Birmingham, England, in the shot put.

== Personal life ==
From Ingolstadt, he trains in Munich with LG Stadtwerke München. He is a member of the Bavarian Police with whom is a member of their elite sports program.
