= Bulgaria at the 2022 European Championships =

in (Germany) Munich 11 August 2022 – 22 August 2022
- Competitors: 30 in 7 sports
- Medals Ranked 35th: Gold 0 Silver 0 Bronze 1 Total 1

European Championships appearances
- 2018; 2022

Bulgaria will compete at the 2022 European Championships in Munich from August 11 to August 22, 2022.

== Medallists ==
Medal	Name	Sport	Event	Date
Bronze	Kristian Vasilev	Rowing	Men's single sculls	14 August

== Competitors ==
The following is the list of number of competitors in the Championships:

Sport	Men	Women	Total
Artistic gymnastics (men and women)	5	1	6
Athletics	2	4	6
Canoe sprint	3	2	5
Cycling track	1	0	1
Rowing	2	1	3
Sport climbing	3	1	4
Table tennis	2	3	5
Total	18	12	30

== Athletics ==
Bulgaria entered the following athletes.

Key

- Q = Qualified for the next round
- q = Qualified for the next round as a fastest loser or, in field events, by position without achieving the qualifying target
- NR = National record
- PB = Personal best
- SB = Season best
- N/A = Round not applicable for the event

=== Men ===
Field events

Athlete	Event	Qualification		Final	
Athlete	Event	Distance	Position	Distance	Position
Tihomir Ivanov	High jump	2.21 =SB	3 q	2.18	8
Georgi Nachev	Triple jump	16.04 w	13	did not advance	

=== Women ===
Road events

Athletes	Event	Final	
Athletes	Event	Result	Rank
Militsa Mircheva	Marathon	Did not finish	
Marinela Nineva	Marathon	2:45:40 SB	45

Field events

Athlete	Event	Qualification		Final	
Athlete	Event	Distance	Position	Distance	Position
Mirela Demireva	High jump	1.87	9 q	1.86	9
Aleksandra Nacheva	Triple jump	13.73	11 q	13.33	11

== Gymnastics ==
Bulgaria has entered five male and five female athletes.

=== Men ===
Qualification

Athlete	Event	Qualification								Final							
Athlete	Event	Apparatus						Total	Rank	Apparatus						Total	Rank
Athlete	Event	F	PH	R	V	PB	HB	Total	Rank	F	PH	R	V	PB	HB	Total	Rank
Yordan Aleksandrov	Team	11.633	11.900	13.166	13.833	12.200	13.633	76.365	47	—	—	—	—	—	—	—	
Dimitar Dimitrov	Team	11.266	—	12.233	14.466	—	—	—	—	—	—	—	—	—	—	—	
David Huddleston	Team	11.666	13.633	13.133	14.266	14.333	12.833	79.864	20	—	—	—	—	—	—	—	
Rayan Radkov	Team	13.300	—	—	—	11.733	12.266	—	—	—	—	—	—	—	—	—	
Teodor Trifonov	Team	13.133	12.266	11.500	13.266	12.733	12.500	75.398	52	—	—	—	—	—	—	—	
Total	Team	36.432	39.199	38.532	42.565	39.266	38.966	234.960	18	—	—	—	—	—	—	—	—

=== Women ===
Qualification

Athlete	Qualification					
Athlete	Apparatus				Total	Rank
Athlete	V	UB	BB	F	Total	Rank
Valentina Georgieva	13.766 Q	10.266	11.033	11.033	46.098	53

Finals

Athlete	Apparatus	Score1	Score2	Rank
Valentina Georgieva	Vault	12.733	DNS	DNF

== Rowing ==
Men

Athlete	Event	Heats		Repechage		Semifinals		Final	
Athlete	Event	Time	Rank	Time	Rank	Time	Rank	Time	Rank
Kristian Vasilev	Single sculls	7.57.49	2 SA/B	—	—	7.17.22	3 FA	7.16.37	3rd place, bronze medalist(s)
Lazar Penev	Lightweight single sculls	7.58.30	1 SA/B	—	—	7.24.16	3 FA	DNS	6

Women

Athlete	Event	Heats		Repechage		Semifinals		Final	
Athlete	Event	Time	Rank	Time	Rank	Time	Rank	Time	Rank
Desislava Angelova	Single sculls	8.47.63	2 SA/B	—	—	8.19.57	4 FB	8.21.54	7

== Sport climbing ==
Boulder

Athlete	Event	Qualification		Semifinal		Final	
Athlete	Event	Result	Rank	Result	Rank	Result	Rank
Slav Kirov	Men's boulder	1T2z 2 6	32	—	—	—	—
Matey Mitsev	Men's boulder	0T1z 0 4	59	—	—	—	—
Nikolay Rusev	Men's boulder	0T2z 0 11	56	—	—	—	—
Aleksandra Totkova	Women's boulder	1T3z 4 8	36	—	—	—	—

Combined

Athlete	Event	Qualification		Final						
Athlete	Event	Total	Rank	Boulder		Lead			Total	Rank
Athlete	Event	Total	Rank	Result	Place	Hold	Time	Place	Total	Rank
Slav Kirov	Men's	56.50	26	Did not advance						
Matey Mitsev	Men's	12.50	36	Did not advance						
Nikolay Rusev	Men's	19.67	32	Did not advance						
Aleksandra Totkova	Women's	569.00	10	Did not advance						

Lead

Athlete	Event	Qualification						Semifinal			Final		
Athlete	Event	Hold1	Time1	Hold2	Time2	Points	Rank	Hold	Time	Rank	Hold	Time	Rank
Slav Kirov	Men's lead	22+	3:13	30+	4:23	36.99	39	—	—	—	—	—	—
Matey Mitsev	Men's lead	10+	0:45	23+	2:56	46.83	49	—	—	—	—	—	—
Nikolay Rusev	Men's lead	22+	2:36	26	3:22	39.95	41	—	—	—	—	—	—
Aleksandra Totkova	Women's lead	47	6:00	37+	1:57	8.15	8 Q	26+	4:12	6 Q	40+	5:07	5

== Table tennis ==
Bulgaria entered 2 men and 3 women.

=== Men ===
Athlete	Event	Qualification stage				Preliminary Round 1	Preliminary Round 2	Round of 64	Round of 32	Round of 16	Quarterfinals	Semifinals	Final / BM	
Athlete	Event	Opposition Score	Opposition Score	Opposition Score	Rank	Opposition Score	Opposition Score	Opposition Score	Opposition Score	Opposition Score	Opposition Score	Opposition Score	Opposition Score	Rank
Teodor Alexandrov	Singles	Serdaroglu (AUT); W 3–2	Karabaxhak (KOS); W 3–0	Martinko (CZE); L 0–3	2 Q	Bye	Andersen (DEN); L 1–3	Did not advance						65
Petyo Krastev	Singles	Širuček (CZE); L 0–3	Smirnov (EST); W 3–0	Zhmudenko (UKR); L 0–3	3	Did not advance								
Teodor Alexandrov; Petyo Krastev	Doubles	—				Bye	Hribar / Cvetko (SLO); L 0–3	Did not advance						33

=== Women ===
Athlete	Event	Qualification stage				Preliminary Round 1	Preliminary Round 2	Round of 64	Round of 32	Round of 16	Quarterfinals	Semifinals	Final / BM	
Athlete	Event	Opposition Score	Opposition Score	Opposition Score	Rank	Opposition Score	Opposition Score	Opposition Score	Opposition Score	Opposition Score	Opposition Score	Opposition Score	Opposition Score	Rank
Kalina Hristova	Singles	Brateyko (UKR); L 0–3	Matos (POR); L 1–3	—	3	Did not advance								
Polina Trifonova	Singles	Musajeva (LAT); W 3–0	Stražar (SLO); W 3–1	—	1 Q	Bye		Ni (LUX); L 1–4	Did not advance					33
Maria Yovkova	Singles	Malobabić (CRO); L 0–3	Kulakçeken (TUR); L 1–3	—	3	Did not advance								
Kalina Hristova; Rikke Skattet (NOR)	Doubles	—				Bye	Xiao (ESP) / Diaconu (ROU); L 1–3	—	Did not advance					33
Polina Trifonova; Maria Yovkova	Doubles	—				Bye	Mešetović (BIH) / Meletie (CYP); W 3–0	—	Matelová (CZE) / Balážová (SVK); L 0–3	Did not advance				17

=== Mixed ===
Athlete	Event	Preliminary Round 1	Preliminary Round 2	Round of 32	Round of 16	Quarterfinals	Semifinals	Final / BM	
Athlete	Event	Opposition Score	Opposition Score	Opposition Score	Opposition Score	Opposition Score	Opposition Score	Opposition Score	Rank
Teodor Alexandrov; Polina Trifonova	Doubles	Giardi (SMR) / Biogradlić (BIH); W 3–0	Gündüz / Altinkaya (TUR); L 1–3	Did not advance					33
Petyo Krastev; Maria Yovkova	Doubles	Žeimys / Riliskyte (LTU); W 3–0	Moullet / Moret (SUI); L 0–3	Did not advance					33
