= Bulgaria at the 2018 European Championships =

- IOC code: BUL

in (United Kingdom) Glasgow (Germany) Berlin 2 August 2018 – 12 August 2018
- Competitors: 28 in 4 sports
- Medals Ranked 29th: Gold 0 Silver 1 Bronze 0 Total 1

European Championships appearances
- 2018; 2022

Bulgaria competed at the inaugural 7 sports 2018 European Championships from 2 to 12 August 2018. It competed in 4 sports.

== Medallists ==
Medal	Name	Sport	Event	Date
Silver	Mirela Demireva	Athletics	Women's high jump	10 August

== Aquatics ==
=== Diving ===
Men

Athlete	Event	Preliminaries		Final	
Athlete	Event	Points	Rank	Points	Rank
Alexander Kostov	1 m springboard	278.75	23	did not advance	
Alexander Kostov	3 m springboard	304.05	18	did not advance	

=== Swimming ===
Men

Athlete	Event	Heats		Semifinal		Final	
Athlete	Event	Result	Rank	Result	Rank	Result	Rank
Lyubomir Epitropov	50 metre breaststroke	29.63	49	did not advance			
Lyubomir Epitropov	100 metre breaststroke	1:02.38	38	did not advance			
Lyubomir Epitropov	200 metre breaststroke	2:14.20	27	did not advance			
Antani Ivanov	50 metre butterfly	24.99	59	did not advance			
Antani Ivanov	100 metre butterfly	53.86	37	did not advance			
Antani Ivanov	200 metre butterfly	1:56.33	7 Q	1:56.68	7 Q	1:57.88	8
Lachezar Shumkov	50 metre breaststroke	28.40	32	did not advance			
Lachezar Shumkov	100 metre breaststroke	1:02.58	40	did not advance			
Lachezar Shumkov	200 metre breaststroke	2:17.22	31	did not advance			

Women

Athlete	Event	Heats		Semifinal		Final	
Athlete	Event	Result	Rank	Result	Rank	Result	Rank
Gabriela Georgieva	50 metre backstroke	29.58	32	did not advance			
Gabriela Georgieva	100 metre backstroke	1:02.97	32	did not advance			
Gabriela Georgieva	200 metre backstroke	2:13.11	8 Q	2:13.19	11	did not advance	

=== Synchronised swimming ===
Athlete	Event	Preliminaries		Final	
Athlete	Event	Points	Rank	Points	Rank
Aleksandra Atanasova	Solo free routine	75.5333	17	did not advance	
Hristina Damyanova	Solo technical routine	—N/a		72.0210	17
Aleksandra Atanasova; Dalia Penkova	Duet free routine	73.2333	19	did not advance	
Aleksandra Atanasova; Dalia Penkova	Duet technical routine	—N/a		70.8170	18

== Athletics ==
Men
Track and road

Athlete	Event	Heats		Semifinal		Final	
Athlete	Event	Result	Rank	Result	Rank	Result	Rank
Denis Dimitrov	100 metres	10.45	21	did not advance			
Petar Peev	100 metres	10.75	38	did not advance			
Denis Dimitrov	200 metres	21.43	30	did not advance			
Ivo Balabanov	3000 metres steeplechase	8:51.52 PB	25	—N/a		did not advance	
Mitko Tsenov	3000 metres steeplechase	8:36.39	18	—N/a		did not advance	

Field events

Athletes	Event	Qualification		Final	
Athletes	Event	Distance	Position	Distance	Position
Denis Eradiri	Long jump	7.50	24	did not advance	
Momchil Karailiev	Triple jump	DNS			
Georgi Ivanov	Shot put	19.40 SB	19	did not advance	

Women
Track and road

Athlete	Event	Heats		Semifinal		Final	
Athlete	Event	Result	Rank	Result	Rank	Result	Rank
Inna Eftimova	100 metres	11.45	7 Q	11.52	22	did not advance	
Inna Eftimova	200 metres	23.56	8 q	23.62	21	did not advance	
Ivet Lalova-Collio	200 metres	Bye		22.65	3 Q	22.82	5

Field events

Athletes	Event	Qualification		Final	
Athletes	Event	Distance	Position	Distance	Position
Mirela Demireva	High jump	1.90	1 q	2.00	Silver medal
Milena Mitkova	Long jump	6.29	20	did not advance	
Aleksandra Nacheva	Triple jump	13.39	26	did not advance	
Gabriela Petrova	Triple jump	14.05	12 Q	14.26	6
Radoslava Mavrodieva	Shot put	17.87	5 Q	18.03	6

== Gymnastics ==
=== Men ===
Qualification

Athlete	Qualification					
Athlete	Apparatus					
Athlete	F	PH	R	V	PB	HB
Yordan Aleksandrov	13.066	10.766	11.900	—N/a	13.200	13.366
Dimitar Dimitrov	13.400	11.566	—N/a	14.199 Q	—N/a	

Individual finals

Athlete	Event	Apparatus						Rank
Athlete	Event	F	PH	R	V	PB	HB	Rank
Dimitar Dimitrov	Vault	—N/a			14.183	—N/a		7

=== Women ===
Qualification

Athlete	Qualification			
Athlete	Apparatus			
Athlete	V	UB	BB	F
Greta Banishka	—N/a	7.066	8.800	10.433
Pamela Georgieva	—N/a	7.500	11.333	12.000

== Rowing ==
Men

Athlete	Event	Heats		Repechage		Semifinals		Final	
Athlete	Event	Time	Rank	Time	Rank	Time	Rank	Time	Rank
Kristian Vasilev	Single sculls	7:03.73	3 R	6:56.20	2 SF A/B	7:02.60	5 FB	6:56.59	8
