= Athletics at the 2026 Commonwealth Games – Men's shot put =

Men's shot put at the 2026 Commonwealth Games
- Venue: Scotstoun Stadium, Glasgow
- Dates: 29 July (qualification); 30 July (final)
- Winning distance: 21.07 m

Medalists
gold medal	Chukwuebuka Enekwechi	Nigeria
silver medal	Tom Walsh	New Zealand
bronze medal	Scott Lincoln	England

The men's shot put at the 2026 Commonwealth Games, as part of the athletics programme, will place in the Scotstoun Stadium on 29 and 30 July 2026.

== Records ==
Prior to this competition, the existing world, Commonwealth and Commonwealth Games records were as follows:

Men's Shot put
World record	23.56 m	Ryan Crouser (USA)	27 May 2023	Los Angeles, United States
Commonwealth record	22.90 m	Tomas Walsh (NZL)	5 Oct 2019	Doha, Qatar
Games record	22.45 m	Tomas Walsh (NZL)	8 Apr 2018	Gold Coast, Australia

== Schedule ==
The schedule is as follows:

Date	Time	Round
29 July 2026	10:00	Qualification
30 July 2026	19:00	Final

All times are British Summer Time (UTC+1)

== Results ==
=== Qualification ===
The qualification round is scheduled for the morning of 29 July.

Rank	Group	Name	#1	#2	#3	Result	Notes
1	A	Tom Walsh (NZL)	21.03			21.03	Q
2	A	Tajinderpal Singh Toor (IND)	19.93	20.14		20.14	Q
3	A	Scott Lincoln (ENG)	20.09			20.09	Q
4	B	Chukwuebuka Enekwechi (NGR)	20.03			20.03	Q
5	B	Samardeep Singh Gill (IND)	19.95	19.75	x	19.95	q
6	B	Nick Palmer (NZL)	19.86	x	19.92	19.92	q
7	B	Aiden Smith (RSA)	19.65	19.31	19.86	19.86	q
8	A	Petros Michaelides (CYP)	18.55	18.70'	18.45	18.70	q
9	A	Djimon Gumbs (IVB)	18.15	18.49	18.32	18.49	q
10	A	Jonathan-Deiwea Detageouwa (NRU)	16.01	15.91	16.84	16.84	q, SB
11	B	Bernard Baptiste (MRI)	15.91	15.16	15.83	15.91	q
12	A	Penisimani Taeiloa (TGA)	x	x	14.94	14.94	q
13	B	Christopher Johnson (ANT)	14.79	x	14.59	14.79	
14	B	Julian Turnock (GIB)	11.95	12.28	12.31	12.31	NR
15	B	Caleb Misipeka (NIU)	11.10	x	10.87	11.10	SB

=== Final ===
The final is scheduled for the evening of 30 July.

Rank	Name	1	2	3	4	5	6	Result	Notes
1st place, gold medalist(s)	Chukwuebuka Enekwechi (NGR)	19.60	20.48	20.82	x	21.07	19.47	21.07	
2nd place, silver medalist(s)	Tom Walsh (NZL)	21.03	20.56	x	x	x	20.51	21.03	
3rd place, bronze medalist(s)	Scott Lincoln (ENG)	20.70	20.99	x	20.74	20.43	20.91	20.99	
4	Aiden Smith (RSA)	19.04	19.47	20.31	x	19.85	19.86	20.31	
5	Tajinderpal Singh Toor (IND)	20.06	19.98	20.27	19.93	20.26	19.79	20.27	
6	Nick Palmer (NZL)	19.42	x	20.27	19.97	19.99	20.02	20.27	
7	Samardeep Singh Gill (IND)	19.56	19.63	20.03	x	x	x	20.03	
8	Petros Michaelides (CYP)	18.73	19.23	x	19.11	x	x	19.23	
9	Djimon Gumbs (IVB)	18.45	18.27	x	Did not advance			18.45	
10	Jonathan-Deiwea Detageouwa (NRU)	16.99	16.56	16.34	Did not advance			16.99	SB
11	Bernard Baptiste (MRI)	16.27	15.36	16.13	Did not advance			16.27	
—	Penisimani Taeiloa (TGA)	x	x	x	Did not advance			NM	
