= 2025 European Athletics U23 Championships – Men's shot put =

Men's shot put at the 2025 European Athletics U23 Championships
- Venue: Fana Stadion
- Location: Bergen, Norway
- Dates: 19 July
- Competitors: 17 from 13 nations
- Winning distance: 20.02 m

Medalists
gold medal	Tizian Lauria	Germany
silver medal	Leo Zikovic	Sweden
bronze medal	Yannick Rolvink	Netherlands

The men's shot put event at the 2025 European Athletics U23 Championships was held in Bergen, Norway, at Fana Stadion on 19 July.

== Records ==
Prior to the competition, the records were as follows:

Record	Athlete (nation)	Distance (m)	Location	Date
European U23 record	Konrad Bukowiecki (POL)	22.25 m	Chorzów, Poland	14 September 2019
Championship U23 record	Konrad Bukowiecki (POL)	21.59 m	Bydgoszcz, Poland	14 July 2017

== Results ==
=== Qualification ===
All athletes over 19.00 m (Q) or at least the 12 best performers (q) advance to the final.

==== Group A ====
Place	Athlete	Nation	#1	#2	#3	Result	Notes
1	Tizian Lauria	Germany	18.96	19.25		19.25 m	Q
2	Lasse Schulz	Germany	18.05	18.10	18.48	18.48 m	q
3	Yannick Rolvink	Netherlands	18.41	x	x	18.41 m	q
4	Piers Cameron	Great Britain	18.13	x	x	18.13 m	q
5	Hamza Muharemović	Bosnia and Herzegovina	16.76	17.20	17.10	17.20 m	q
6	Alexander Anthonissen	Belgium	16.96	16.71	x	16.96 m	
7	Karel Šula	Slovakia	x	16.49	16.44	16.49 m	
8	Dumitru Maruseac	Moldova	15.57	15.64	x	15.64 m	
—	Andri Matrov	Estonia	x	x	x	NM	

==== Group B ====
Place	Athlete	Nation	#1	#2	#3	Result	Notes
1	Leo Zikovic	Sweden	18.72	18.50	x	18.72 m	q
2	Philipp Thomas	Germany	18.02	18.01	17.81	18.02 m	q
3	Alexandr Mazur	Moldova	17.59	x	17.68	17.68 m	q
4	Andreas De Lathauwer	Belgium	17.62	17.36	16.80	17.62 m	q
5	Todor Petrov	Bulgaria	17.47	17.08	17.28	17.47 m	q
6	Ali Peker	Turkey	16.54	x	17.39	17.39 m	q
7	Stefan Jovanov	Serbia	16.97	16.97	17.12	17.12 m	q
8	Theofanis Mavrodontis	Greece	x	x	16.08	16.08 m	

=== Final ===
Place	Athlete	Nation	#1	#2	#3	#4	#5	#6	Result	Notes
1st place, gold medalist(s)	Tizian Lauria	Germany	x	18.94	19.77	19.97	19.59	20.02	20.02 m	
2nd place, silver medalist(s)	Leo Zikovic	Sweden	19.20	19.04	18.77	19.47	19.01	x	19.47 m	PB
3rd place, bronze medalist(s)	Yannick Rolvink	Netherlands	17.84	x	17.34	x	19.01	x	19.01 m	
4	Philipp Thomas	Germany	17.96	18.90	18.19	x	x	x	18.90 m	
5	Alexandr Mazur	Moldova	x	x	18.79	18.74	x	18.61	18.79 m	
6	Lasse Schulz	Germany	18.33	18.45	18.01	x	x	18.24	18.45 m	
7	Todor Petrov	Bulgaria	17.91	17.92	x	18.44	x	x	18.44 m	PB
8	Ali Peker	Turkey	x	x	17.76	18.33	x	x	18.33 m	
9	Hamza Muharemović	Bosnia and Herzegovina	16.57	16.97	17.16				17.16 m	
10	Andreas De Lathauwer	Belgium	15.90	16.99	17.08				17.08 m	
11	Stefan Jovanov	Serbia	16.55	x	x				16.55 m	
—	Piers Cameron	Great Britain	x	x	x				NM	
