= 2025 Asian Athletics Championships – Men's shot put =

Men's shot put at the 2025 Asian Athletics Championships
- Venue: Gumi Civic Stadium
- Location: Gumi, South Korea
- Dates: 29 May
- Competitors: 15 from 13 nations
- Winning distance: 20.32 m

Medalists
gold medal	Mohammad Reza Tayebi	Iran
silver medal	Xing Jialiang	China
bronze medal	Mohammed Tolo	Saudi Arabia

The men's shot put event at the 2025 Asian Athletics Championships was held on 29 May.

== Records ==
Records before the 2025 Asian Athletics Championships
Record	Athlete (nation)	Distance (m)	Location	Date
World record	Ryan Crouser (USA)	23.56	Los Angeles, United States	27 May 2023
Asian record	Mohammed Daoud Tolu (KSA)	21.80	Madrid, Spain	21 June 2024
Championship record	Inderjeet Singh (IND)	20.41	Wuhan, China	3 June 2015
World leading	Payton Otterdahl (USA)	21.97	Rabat, Morocco	25 May 2025
Asian leading	Mohammed Daoud Tolu (KSA)	20.28	Nehvizdy, Czech Republic	19 February 2025

== Schedule ==
The event schedule, in local time (UTC+9), was as follows:

Date	Time	Round
29 May	21:35	Final

== Results ==
Place	Athlete	Nation	#1	#2	#3	#4	#5	#6	Result	Notes
1st place, gold medalist(s)	Mohammad Reza Tayebi	Iran	19.21	19.34	19.58	20.27	20.32	19.87	20.32 m	
2nd place, silver medalist(s)	Xing Jialiang	China	18.62	19.24	19.61	19.97	18.97	19.76	19.97 m	
3rd place, bronze medalist(s)	Mohammed Tolo	Saudi Arabia	19.65	19.92	19.77	19.89	19.41	19.92	19.92 m	
4	Abdelrahman Mahmoud	Bahrain	19.01	19.13	19.11	19.27	18.97	18.86	19.27 m	SB
5	Ma Hau-wei	Chinese Taipei	17.68	18.47	x	19.25	18.79	19.23	19.25 m	
6	Samardeep Singh Gill	India	18.76	17.86	19.25	x	x	x	19.25 m	
7	Willie Morrison	Philippines	17.91	18.12	18.04	x	18.55	18.05	18.55 m	SB
8	Hassan Ajamibakhtiarvand	Iran	18.20	x	x	x	18.03	x	18.20 m	
9	Shim Jun	South Korea	17.37	18.07	17.99				18.07 m	
10	Jonah Chang Anak Rigan	Malaysia	16.81	18.05	17.18				18.05 m	SB
11	Ivan Ivanov	Kazakhstan	17.55	17.09	17.92				17.92 m	SB
12	Park Si-hoon	South Korea	16.78	17.47	17.26				17.47 m	
13	Doston Rajabov	Uzbekistan	16.36	17.16	17.33				17.33 m	SB
14	Djibrine Adoum Ahmat	Qatar	16.23	x	16.30				16.30 m	
15	Yan Htet Wai	Myanmar	13.79	14.56	14.77				14.77 m	
