= Bosnia and Herzegovina at the 2022 European Athletics Championships =

- WA code: BIH
- National federation: ASBiH

in Munich
- Competitors: 2 (2 men and 0 women) in 1 event
- Medals: Gold 0 Silver 0 Bronze 0 Total 0

European Athletics Championships appearances
- 1994; 1998; 2002; 2006; 2010; 2012; 2014; 2016; 2018; 2022; 2024

Bosnia and Herzegovina competed at the 2022 European Athletics Championships in Munich, Germany, from 15–21 August 2022. Bosnia and Herzegovina was represented by 2 athletes.

== Results ==
Bosnia and Herzegovina entered the following athletes.

Men
Track and road

Athletes	Event	Heats		Semifinal		Final	
Athletes	Event	Result	Rank	Result	Rank	Result	Rank
Abedin Mujezinović	800 metres	1:47.29	7 q	1:50.20	16	did not advance	
Amel Tuka	800 metres	1:47.73	18	did not advance			

== See also ==
- Bosnia and Herzegovina at the 2022 European Championships
