= Bosnia and Herzegovina at the 2018 European Athletics Championships =

- WA code: BIH
- National federation: ASBiH

in Berlin
- Competitors: 6 (6 men and 0 women) in 3 events
- Medals: Gold 0 Silver 0 Bronze 0 Total 0

European Athletics Championships appearances
- 1994; 1998; 2002; 2006; 2010; 2012; 2014; 2016; 2018; 2022; 2024

Bosnia and Herzegovina competed at the 2018 European Athletics Championships in Berlin, Germany, from 6–12 August 2018. Bosnia and Herzegovina were represented by 6 athletes.

== Results ==
Men
Track and road

Athletes	Event	Heats		Semifinal		Final	
Athletes	Event	Result	Rank	Result	Rank	Result	Rank
Abedin Mujezinović	800 metres	DQ 163.2 (b)	-	did not advance			
Amel Tuka	800 metres	1:46.47	3 Q	1:47.24	13	did not advance	

Field events

Athletes	Event	Qualification		Final	
Athletes	Event	Distance	Position	Distance	Position
Hamza Alić	Shot put	19.34 m	20	did not advance	
Kemal Mešić	Shot put	18.70 m	27	did not advance	
Mesud Pezer	Shot put	20.16 m	7 Q	19.91 m	12
Dejan Mileusnić	Javelin throw	67.16 m	28	did not advance	

== See also ==
- Bosnia and Herzegovina at the 2018 European Championships
