= Mohammad Reza Tayebi =

Iranian track and field athlete (born 1997)

Personal information
- Native name: محمدرضا طیبی
- Nationality: Iranian
- Born: 25 March 1997 (age 29)

Sport
- Sport: Athletics
- Event: Shot put
Medal record
Men's athletics
Representing Iran
Asian Championships
| Gold medal – first place | 2025 Gumi | Shot put |
Asian Games
| Gold medal – first place | 2026 Aichi–Nagoya | Shot put |
Islamic Solidarity Games
| Silver medal – second place | 2025 Riyadh | Shot put |

Mohammad Reza Tayebi (Persian: محمدرضا طیبی, born 25 March 1997) is an Iranian track and field athlete who specializes in shot put.

== Career ==
In May 2025, Tayebi competed at the 2025 Asian Athletics Championships and won a gold medal in the shot put with a throw of 20.32 metres. In November 2025, he competed at the 2025 Islamic Solidarity Games and won a silver medal in the shot put with a throw of 19.35 metres.

In September 2026, he competed at the 2026 Asian Games and won a gold medal in the shot put with an Asian Games record of 20.81 metres. This was Iran's first gold medal in the event since Jalal Keshmiri at the 1974 Asian Games.
