= Portugal at the 2018 European Championships =

- IOC code: POR

in (United Kingdom) Glasgow (Germany) Berlin 2 August 2018 – 12 August 2018
- Competitors: 92 in 7 sports
- Medals Ranked 18th: Gold 2 Silver 2 Bronze 0 Total 4

European Championships appearances
- 2018; 2022

Portugal competed at the inaugural 7 sports 2018 European Championships from the 2nd of August to the 12th of August in 2018. It competed in all sports.

== Medallists ==
Medal	Name	Sport	Event	Date
Gold	Inês Henriques	Athletics	Women's 50 kilometres walk	7 August
Gold	Nelson Évora	Athletics	Men's triple jump	12 August
Silver	Ivo Oliveira	Cycling	Men's individual pursuit	5 August
Silver	Rui Oliveira	Cycling	Men's elimination race	7 August
