= Xing Jialiang =

Chinese shot putter (born 2001)

Personal information
- Born: 26 May 2001 (age 25)

Sport
- Sport: Athletics
- Event: Shot put

Achievements and titles
- Personal bests: Shot put: 20.44 m (Quzhou, 2025) NR
Medal record
Men's athletics
Representing China
Asian Championships
Silver medal – second place	2025 Gumi	Shot put
Asian Indoor Championships
Bronze medal – third place	2026 Tianjin	Shot put
Summer World University Games
Silver medal – second place	2025 Bochum	Shot put

Xing Jialiang (born 26 May 2001) is a Chinese shot putter. He won both the Chinese Indoor and Outdoor Championships titles in 2025, and set a new Chinese national record. He won the silver medal at the 2025 Asian Athletics Championships.

== Biography ==
From north China's Inner Mongolia Autonomous Region, his father is a PE teacher who also competed in throwing events. Additionally, his twin brother Xing Jiadong also competes as a discus thrower. He finished fourth in the discus throw, with his brother sixth, at the 2015 National Middle School Track and Field Championships. After which they both attended and trained at the High School attached to Tsinghua University in Beijing. In 2020, both began to study at Peking University. He finished fourth in the shot put at the 2021 University Games in Chengdu.

He won the shot put at the Chinese Indoor Athletics Championships in March 2025 with a throw of 20.10 metres. In May 2025, he was a silver medalist at the 2025 Asian Athletics Championships in the shot put in Gumi, South Korea with a throw of 19.97 metres. In July 2025, he won the silver medal in the shot put at the 2025 University Games in Germany, behind South African Aiden Smith. He set a new national record of 20.44 metres in August 2025 in winning the Chinese Championships, and competed at the 2025 World Championships in Tokyo, Japan, the following month.

In February 2026, he won the bronze medal in the shot put at the 2026 Asian Indoor Athletics Championships in Tianjin, China.
