= Tizian Lauria =

German shot putter

Personal information
- Born: 24 March 2003 (age 23)

Sport
- Sport: Athletics
- Event: Shot put

Achievements and titles
- Personal best(s): Shot put: 20.09m (Halle, 2025)
Medal record
Men's athletics
Representing Germany
European U23 Championships
Gold medal – first place	2025 Bergen	Shot put
Gold medal – first place	2023 Espoo	Shot put
World U20 Championships
Bronze medal – third place	2022 Cali	Shot put

Tizian Lauria (born 24 March 2003) is a German shot putter. He won the gold medal at the 2023 and 2025 European Athletics U23 Championships and the bronze medal at the 2022 World Athletics U20 Championships.

== Career ==
From Schwäbisch Gmünd, he was a member of LG Filder before joining VfL Sindelfingen. He competed in discus throw and the shot put as a teenager. He led the world U20 list in 2020 with a throw of 21.15 meters in the junior shot put weight. He the bronze medal at the 2022 World Athletics U20 Championships in Cali, Colombia with a throw of 20.55 metres.

He won the gold medal at the 2023 European Athletics U23 Championships in Espoo, Finland with a personal best shot put of 19.80 metres to win ahead of compatriot and club teammate Eric Maihöfer.

At the 2025 European Throwing Cup in Nicosia, Cyprus he won the U23 competition after a fourth round throw or 19.21m and a final throw of 19.55m to win by a single centimetre from Dutchman Jarno van Daalen. He threw a new personal best of 20.09 metres in May 2025 in Halle. Later that month, he won the German University Championships in Duisburg.

He won the gold medal at the 2025 European Athletics U23 Championships in Bergen, Norway in July 2025 managing a distance of 19.77m in the third round, and improving to 19.97m in the fourth round and closing out victory with a final round 20.02m.

He was named in the German squad to represent the country at the 2025 University Games, held in the Rhine-Ruhr region of Germany.

== Personal life ==
He is a trainee at the Police College in Baden-Württemberg.
