= Montenegro at the 2024 European Athletics Championships =

- Flag of Montenegro
- WA code: MNE

in Rome, Italy 7 June 2024 – 12 June 2022
- Competitors: 3 (2 men and 1 woman)
- Medals: Gold 0 Silver 0 Bronze 0 Total 0

European Athletics Championships appearances
- 2006; 2010; 2012; 2014; 2016; 2018; 2022; 2024; 2026

Montenegro competed at the 2024 European Athletics Championships in Rome, Italy from 7–12 June 2024.

== Results ==
Montenegro entered the following athletes.

Key

- Q = Qualified for the next round
- q = Qualified for the next round as a fastest loser or, in field events, by position without achieving the qualifying target
- NR = National record
- PB = Personal best
- SB = Season best
- N/A = Round not applicable for the event

=== Men ===
Field events

Athlete	Event	Qualification		Final	
Athlete	Event	Distance	Position	Distance	Position
Danijel Furtula	Discus throw	57.74	30	Did not advance	

Combined events – Decathlon

Athlete	Event	100 m	LJ	SP	HJ	400 m	110H	DT	PV	JT	1500 m	Final	Rank
Darko Pešić	Result	11.58 SB	6.98 SB	14.67	1.96 SB	51.58 SB	15.43 SB	44.78 SB	4.20 SB	55.68 SB	4:38.33 SB	7421 SB	21
Darko Pešić	Points	736	809	769	767	743	798	762	673	673	691	7421 SB	21

=== Women ===
Field events

Athlete	Event	Qualification		Final	
Athlete	Event	Distance	Position	Distance	Position
Marija Vuković	High jump	NM		Did not advance	
