= 2026 European Athletics Championships – Men's shot put =

Men's shot put at the 2026 European Athletics Championships
- Venue: Alexander Stadium
- Location: Birmingham, United Kingdom
- Dates: 10 August 2026
- Competitors: 29 from 20 nations
- Winning distance: 22.31 m

Medalists
gold medal	Leonardo Fabbri	Italy
silver medal	Zane Weir	Italy
bronze medal	Wictor Petersson	Sweden

The men's shot put at the 2026 European Athletics Championships took place over two rounds at the Alexander Stadium in Birmingham, United Kingdom, on 10 August 2026.

== Background ==
Records before the 2026 European Athletics Championships
Record	Athlete (nation)	Distance	Location	Date
World record	Ryan Crouser (USA)	23.56 m	Los Angeles, United States	27 May 2023
European record	Ulf Timmermann (GDR)	23.06 m	Chania, Greece	22 May 1988
Championship record	Leonardo Fabbri (ITA)	22.45 m	Rome, Italy	8 June 2024
World leading	Leonardo Fabbri (ITA)	22.74 m	Eugene, United States	4 July 2026
European leading	Leonardo Fabbri (ITA)	22.74 m	Eugene, United States	4 July 2026

== Qualification ==
For the men's shot put, the qualification period was from 27 July 2025 to 26 July 2026. Athletes qualified by achieving the entry standard of 20.80 m or better, by wildcard for the 2024 European Athletics Champion, or by their position on the World Athletics Rankings for the event. The target number was 30 athletes.

Qualification standings per 31 July 2026
QP	CP	Country	Athlete	PB	SB	Status	Details
1	1	Italy	Leonardo Fabbri	22.98	22.74	Qualified by Wild Card	Defending European Champion
2	2	Italy	Zane Weir	22.44	21.42	Qualified by Entry Standard	21.42 - Stadio Luigi Ridolfi, Firenze (ITA) - 25 JUL 2026
3	1	Sweden	Wictor Petersson	21.49	21.38	Qualified by Entry Standard	21.38 - Friidrottens Hus, Göteborg (SWE) (i) - 15 FEB 2026
4	1	Poland	Konrad Bukowiecki	22.25	21.34	Qualified by Entry Standard	21.34 - Market square, Białystok (POL) - 31 MAY 2026
5	3	Italy	Nick Ponzio	21.83	21.23	Qualified by Entry Standard	21.23 - Městský stadion, Ústí nad Labem (CZE) - 18 JUN 2026
6	1	Great Britain & N.I.	Scott Lincoln	21.31	21.16	Qualified by Entry Standard	21.16 - Stadion Erzgebirgsblick, Gelenau (GER) - 07 JUN 2026
7	1	Romania	Andrei Rares Toader	21.29	21.08	Qualified by Entry Standard	21.08 - Sala de Atletism Ioan Soter, Bucureşti (ROU) (i) - 01 MAR 2026
8	1	Czech Republic	Tomáš Staněk	22.17	21.00	Qualified by Entry Standard	21.00 - Mestský Stadion Sletište, Kladno (CZE) - 09 JUN 2026
9	1	Georgia	Giorgi Mujaridze	21.21	20.20	Qualified by Entry Standard	20.82 - Olympic Training Base, Almaty (KAZ) - 02 AUG 2025
10	1	Montenegro	Tomaš Đurović	20.60	19.60	Qualified by Universality Place	
11	1	Serbia	Armin Sinančević	21.88	20.59	Qualified by World Rankings	10th - 1192 points
12	1	Bosnia and Herzegovina	Mesud Pezer	21.48	20.61	Qualified by World Rankings	11th - 1190 points
13	1	Germany	Eric Maihöfer	20.63	20.63	Qualified by World Rankings	12th - 1185 points
14	1	Ireland	Eric Favors	20.93	20.40	Qualified by World Rankings	15th - 1163 points
15	4	Italy	Riccardo Ferrara	20.98	20.62	Qualified by World Rankings	18th - 1159 points
16	2	Germany	Georg Harpf	20.46	20.46	Qualified by World Rankings	19th - 1155 points
17	2	Poland	Szymon Mazur	20.18	19.90	Qualified by World Rankings	21st - 1152 points
18	1	France	Stephen Mailagi	20.51	20.51	Qualified by World Rankings	22nd - 1149 points
19	1	Portugal	Tsanko Arnaudov	21.56	19.40	Qualified by World Rankings	24th - 1133 points
20	1	Greece	Konstantinos Gennikis	19.55	19.55	Qualified by World Rankings	25th - 1129 points
21	1	Netherlands	Yannick Rolvink	19.70	19.70	Qualified by World Rankings	26th - 1124 points
22	2	Sweden	Leo Zikovic	19.75	19.75	Qualified by World Rankings	27th - 1120 points
23	2	Netherlands	Jarno van Daalen	20.14	20.14	Qualified by World Rankings	28th - 1118 points
24	1	Moldova	Alexandr Mazur	20.17	20.17	Qualified by World Rankings	30th - 1113 points
25	1	Cyprus	Petros Michaelides	19.49	19.49	Qualified by World Rankings	29th - 1114 points
26	1	Switzerland	Stefan Wieland	19.56	19.56	Qualified by World Rankings	30th - 1113 points
reserve	5	Italy	Vincenzo D'Agostino	19.50	19.50	Qualified by World Rankings	31st - 1111 points
27	1	Turkey	Ali Peker	19.56	19.34	Qualified by World Rankings	37th - 1103 points
28	2	Greece	Iason Machairas	19.50	19.50	Qualified by World Rankings	41st - 1096 points
29	2	Switzerland	Jephté Vogel	19.15	19.03	Qualified by World Rankings	42nd - 1096 points
30	3	Greece	Odysseas Mouzenidis	19.98	19.14	Qualified by World Rankings	43rd - 1094 points
reserve	1	Israel	Menachem Mendel Chen	19.41	19.41	Next best by World Rankings	48th - 1076 points
reserve	1	Hungary	István Fekete	18.86	18.86	Next best by World Rankings	50th - 1071 points
reserve	1	Finland	Miika Lahtonen	19.27	19.27	Next best by World Rankings	57th - 1059 points

Bye to semi-finals	Reserve activated	Withdrawal / reserve unused

== Schedule ==
Date	Time	Round
10 August 2026	12:40	Qualification.
10 August 2026	20:33	Final

All times are local times (UTC+1)

== Results ==
=== Qualification ===
The qualification round was held on 10 August 2026, at 12:40 in the afternoon. All athletes meeting the Qualification Standard (Q) of 20.60 m or at least 12 best performers (q) advanced to the final.

==== Group A ====
Place	Athlete	Nation	Round			Result	Notes
Place	Athlete	Nation	#1	#2	#3	Result	Notes
1	Leonardo Fabbri	Italy	21.29			21.29 m	Q
2	Tomáš Staněk	Czech Republic	19.80	x	20.66	20.66 m	Q
3	Nick Ponzio	Italy	20.48	20.03	r	20.48 m	q
4	Armin Sinančević	Serbia	x	x	20.20	20.20 m	q
5	Eric Maihöfer	Germany	19.90	x	x	19.90 m	q
6	Konrad Bukowiecki	Poland	18.67	19.40	19.82	19.82 m	q
7	Konstantinos Gennikis	Greece	19.37	x	x	19.37 m	
8	Leo Zikovic	Sweden	19.31	x	x	19.31 m	
9	Stephen Mailagi	France	18.50	x	19.17	19.17 m	
10	Giorgi Mujaridze	Georgia	18.91	18.85	x	18.91 m	
11	Alexandr Mazur	Moldova	x	x	18.75	18.75 m	
12	Ali Peker	Turkey	18.53	x	x	18.53 m	
13	Jephté Vogel	Switzerland	x	17.71	18.15	18.15 m	
14	Yannick Rolvink	Netherlands	17.78	x	x	17.78 m	
—	Iason MacHairas	Greece	x	x	x	NM	

==== Group B ====
Place	Athlete	Nation	Round			Result	Notes
Place	Athlete	Nation	#1	#2	#3	Result	Notes
1	Wictor Petersson	Sweden	19.99	20.47	x	20.47 m	q
2	Scott Lincoln	Great Britain & N.I.	x	19.96	x	19.96 m	q
3	Zane Weir	Italy	19.80	19.72	19.66	19.80 m	q
4	Andrei Toader	Romania	19.54	19.01	19.76	19.76 m	q
5	Szymon Mazur	Poland	19.76	18.87	19.06	19.76 m	q
6	Eric Favors	Ireland	19.54	x	x	19.54 m	q
7	Georg Harpf	Germany	19.45	x	x	19.45 m	
8	Tsanko Arnaudov	Portugal	18.59	18.95	x	18.95 m	
9	Mesud Pezer	Bosnia and Herzegovina	18.89	x	x	18.89 m	
10	Riccardo Ferrara	Italy	x	18.85	x	18.85 m	
11	Petros Michaelides	Cyprus	18.78	x	x	18.78 m	
12	Stefan Wieland	Switzerland	18.61	18.57	18.46	18.61 m	
13	Odysseas Mouzenidis	Greece	18.03	18.10	18.35	18.35 m	
14	Jarno van Daalen	Netherlands	x	x	18.06	18.06 m	
15	Tomaš Đurović	Montenegro	x	17.90	x	17.90 m	

=== Final ===
The final was held on 10 August 2026, at 20:33 in the evening.

Place	Athlete	Nation	Round						Result	Notes
Place	Athlete	Nation	#1	#2	#3	#4	#5	#6	Result	Notes
1st place, gold medalist(s)	Leonardo Fabbri	Italy	21.36	21.78	22.31	x	x	x	22.31 m	
2nd place, silver medalist(s)	Zane Weir	Italy	21.12	20.16	x	20.68	19.95	20.91	21.12 m	
3rd place, bronze medalist(s)	Wictor Petersson	Sweden	20.44	20.26	20.30	20.86	20.31	20.97	20.97 m	
4	Scott Lincoln	Great Britain & N.I.	20.40	20.81	20.43	x	20.79	20.09	20.81 m	
5	Andrei Toader	Romania	20.44	20.80	19.87	20.18	20.14	20.18	20.80 m	
6	Nick Ponzio	Italy	20.76	x	20.36	20.36	20.27	x	20.76 m	
7	Konrad Bukowiecki	Poland	19.86	20.38	19.94	19.88	19.74	x	20.38 m	
8	Armin Sinančević	Serbia	20.00	20.02	x	19.84	x	x	20.02 m	
9	Tomáš Staněk	Czech Republic	x	19.68	19.32				19.68 m	
10	Eric Favors	Ireland	19.49	x	19.59				19.59 m	
11	Szymon Mazur	Poland	x	19.14	x				19.14 m	
—	Eric Maihöfer	Germany	x	x	x				NM	
