= Bosnia and Herzegovina at the 2016 European Athletics Championships =

- WA code: BIH
- National federation: ASBiH

in Amsterdam
- Competitors: 5 (5 men) in 3 events
- Medals: Gold 0 Silver 0 Bronze 0 Total 0

European Athletics Championships appearances
- 1994; 1998; 2002; 2006; 2010; 2012; 2014; 2016; 2018; 2022; 2024

Bosnia and Herzegovina competed at the 2016 European Athletics Championships in Amsterdam, Netherlands, between 6 and 10 July 2016.

== Results ==
Men

Track & road events

Athlete	Event	Heat		Semifinal		Final	
Athlete	Event	Result	Rank	Result	Rank	Result	Rank
Amel Tuka	800 m	1:46.94	2 Q	1:47.16	5 Q	1:45.74	4

Field Events

Athlete	Event	Qualification		Final	
Athlete	Event	Distance	Rank	Distance	Rank
Hamza Alić	Shot put	19.61	13	did not advance	
Kemal Mešić	Shot put	NM		did not advance	
Mesud Pezer	Shot put	19.72	12 q	19.49	12
Dejan Mileusnić	Javelin throw	75.00	25	did not advance	
