= Bosnia and Herzegovina at the 2018 European Championships =

- IOC code: BIH

in (United Kingdom) Glasgow (Germany) Berlin 2 August 2018 – 12 August 2018
- Competitors: 8 (7 men and 1 woman) in 2 sports
- Medals: Gold 0 Silver 0 Bronze 0 Total 0

European Championships appearances
- 2018; 2022

Bosnia and Herzegovina competed at the inaugural 7 sports 2018 European Championships from 2 to 12 August 2018. Bosnia and Herzegovina were represented by 8 competitors and competed in 2 sports.

== Aquatics ==
=== Swimming ===
A total of 2 swimmers (1 men and 1 women) represented Bosnia and Herzegovina in the swimming events.

Men

| Athlete | Event | Heats | | Semifinal | | Final | |
| Athlete | Event | Result | Rank | Result | Rank | Result | Rank |
|---|---|---|---|---|---|---|---|
| Emir Muratović | 50 m freestyle | 23.19 | 45 | did not advance | | | |
| Emir Muratović | 100 m freestyle | 50.95 | 62 | did not advance | | | |

Women

| Athlete | Event | Heats | | Semifinal | | Final | |
| Athlete | Event | Result | Rank | Result | Rank | Result | Rank |
|---|---|---|---|---|---|---|---|
| Amina Kajtaz | 50 m butterfly | 27.56 | 29 | did not advance | | | |
| Amina Kajtaz | 100 m butterfly | 59.65 | 16 Q | 59.54 NR | 16 | did not advance | |
| Amina Kajtaz | 200 m butterfly | 2:14.85 NR | 20 | did not advance | | | |

== Athletics ==
A total of 6 athletes (all men) represented Bosnia and Herzegovina in the athletics events.

Men
Track and road

| Athlete | Event | Heats | | Semifinal | | Final | |
| Athlete | Event | Result | Rank | Result | Rank | Result | Rank |
|---|---|---|---|---|---|---|---|
| Abedin Mujezinović | 800 metres | DQ 163.2 (b) | - | did not advance | | | |
| Amel Tuka | 800 metres | 1:46.47 | 3 Q | 1:47.24 | 13 | did not advance | |

Field events

| Athletes | Event | Qualification | | Final | |
| Athletes | Event | Distance | Position | Distance | Position |
|---|---|---|---|---|---|
| Hamza Alić | Shot put | 19.34 m | 20 | did not advance | |
| Kemal Mešić | Shot put | 18.70 m | 27 | did not advance | |
| Mesud Pezer | Shot put | 20.16 m | 7 q | 19.91 m | 12 |
| Dejan Mileusnić | Javelin throw | 67.16 m | 28 | did not advance | |
