= Portugal at the 2022 European Championships =

in (Germany) Munich 11 August 2022 – 22 August 2022
- Competitors: 106 in 9 sports
- Medals Ranked 13th: Gold 4 Silver 2 Bronze 2 Total 8

European Championships appearances
- 2018; 2022

Portugal will compete at the 2022 European Championships in Munich from August 11 to August 22, 2022.

== Medallists ==
| Medal | Name | Sport | Event | Date |
|---|---|---|---|---|
| Gold | Iúri Leitão | Cycling | Men's scratch | 13 August |
| Gold | Pedro Pichardo | Athletics | Men's triple jump | 17 August |
| Gold | Kevin Santos | Canoeing | Men's K-1 200 metres | 21 August |
| Gold | Fernando Pimenta | Canoeing | Men's K-1 5000 metres | 21 August |
| Silver | Auriol Dongmo | Athletics | Women's shot put | 15 August |
| Silver | Fernando Pimenta | Canoeing | Men's K–1 1000 metres | 20 August |
| Bronze | Fernando Pimenta | Canoeing | Men's K–1 500 metres | 19 August |
| Bronze | Norberto Mourão | Canoeing | Men's VL2 200 metres | 19 August |

== Competitors ==
The following is the list of number of competitors in the Championships:

| Sport | Men | Women | Total |
|---|---|---|---|
| Athletics | 26 | 19 | 42 |
| Gymnastics (men and women) | 5 | 5 | 10 |
| Canoe sprint | 14 | 8 | 22 |
| Cycling mountain bike | 2 | 1 | 3 |
| Cycling road | 1 | 1 | 2 |
| Cycling track | 3 | 2 | 5 |
| Rowing | 2 | 0 | 2 |
| Table tennis | 4 | 5 | 9 |
| Triathlon | 5 | 3 | 8 |
| Total | 62 | 44 | 106 |

== Athletics ==
Portugal entered the following athletes.

Key

- Q = Qualified for the next round
- q = Qualified for the next round as a fastest loser or, in field events, by position without achieving the qualifying target
- NR = National record
- PB = Personal best
- SB = Season best
- N/A = Round not applicable for the event

=== Men ===
Track and road events

| Athlete | Event | Heat | | Semifinal | | Final | |
| Athlete | Event | Result | Rank | Result | Rank | Result | Rank |
|---|---|---|---|---|---|---|---|
| Carlos Nascimento | 100 metres | 10.33 | 8 q | 10.40 | 21 | did not advance | |
| João Coelho | 400 metres | 45.78 | 9 q | 45.64 | 8 | did not advance | |
| Isaac Nader | 1500 metres | 3:44.59 | 24 | — | | did not advance | |
| Samuel Barata | 10,000 metres | — | | | | DNF | |
| Rui Pinto | Marathon | — | | | | 2:15:43 | 20 |
| Fábio Oliveira | Marathon | — | | | | 2:18:02 | 34 |
| Luís Saraiva | Marathon | — | | | | 2:21:23 | 48 |
| Hermano Ferreira | Marathon | — | | | | 2:24:21 | 55 |
| Abdel Kader Larrinaga | 110 metres hurdles | 13.76 | 8 Q | 13.81 | 20 | did not advance | |
| João Vítor de Oliveira | 110 metres hurdles | 13.90 | 16 Q | 13.92 | 21 | did not advance | |
| Etson Barros | 3000 metres steeplechase | 8:38.04 | 16 | — | | did not advance | |
| Simão Bastos | 3000 metres steeplechase | 8:57.27 | 27 | — | | did not advance | |
| Miguel Borges | 3000 metres steeplechase | DNF | | — | | did not advance | |
| Hélder Santos | 20 km walk | — | | | | 1:28:43 | 21 |
| Paulo Martins | 20 km walk | — | | | | 1:31:09 | 25 |
| João Vieira | 20 km walk | — | | | | DNS | |
| João Coelho; Mauro Pereira; Ericsson Tavares; Ricardo dos Santos | 4 × 400 metres relay | 3:03.59 NR | 10 | — | | did not advance | |

Field events

| Athlete | Event | Qualification | | Final | |
| Athlete | Event | Distance | Position | Distance | Position |
|---|---|---|---|---|---|
| Gerson Baldé | High jump | 2.12 | 19 | did not advance | |
| Pedro Pichardo | Triple jump | 17.36 | 1 Q | 17.50 | 1st place, gold medalist(s) |
| Tiago Pereira | Triple jump | 16.36 | 10 q | 16.60 | 8 |
| Tsanko Arnaudov | Shot put | 19.42 | 18 | did not advance | |
| Leandro Ramos | Javelin throw | 72.90 | 20 | did not advance | |

=== Women ===
Track and road events

| Athlete | Event | Heat | | Semifinal | | Final | |
| Athlete | Event | Result | Rank | Result | Rank | Result | Rank |
|---|---|---|---|---|---|---|---|
| Lorène Bazolo | 100 metres | 11.48 | 11 Q | 11.42 | 13 | did not advance | |
| Lorène Bazolo | 200 metres | 23.12 | 6 Q | 23.43 | 14 | did not advance | |
| Cátia Azevedo | 400 metres | 51.63 | 4 Q | 51.42 | 11 | did not advance | |
| Marta Pen | 1500 metres | 4:07.82 | 19 | — | | did not advance | |
| Susana Cunha | Marathon | — | | | | 2:51:14 | 50 |
| Sara Moreira | Marathon | — | | | | DNF | |
| Solange Jesús | Marathon | — | | | | DNF | |
| Olimpia Barbosa | 100 metres hurdles | 13.29 | 7 q | 13.57 | 24 | did not advance | |
| Vera Barbosa | 400 metres hurdles | 57.10 | 16 | did not advance | | | |
| Ana Cabecinha | 20 km walk | — | | | | 1:31:56 | 8 |
| Carolina Costa | 20 km walk | — | | | | 1:35:36 PB | 14 |
| Joana Pontes | 20 km walk | — | | | | DQ | |
| Inês Henriques | 35 km walk | — | | | | 2:58:34 | 9 |
| Vitória Oliveira | 35 km walk | — | | | | DNF | |

Field events

| Athlete | Event | Qualification | | Final | |
| Athlete | Event | Distance | Position | Distance | Position |
|---|---|---|---|---|---|
| Evelise Veiga | Long jump | 6.17 | 19 | did not advance | |
| Patrícia Mamona | Triple jump | 14.45 SB | 2 Q | 14.41 | 5 |
| Auriol Dongmo | Shot put | 19.32 | 1 Q | 19.82 NR | 2nd place, silver medalist(s) |
| Jessica Inchude | Shot put | 17.64 | 11 q | 17.93 | 9 |
| Liliana Cá | Discus throw | 65.21 SB | 2 Q | 63.67 | 5 |
| Irina Rodrigues | Discus throw | 57.04 | 12 q | 56.23 | 11 |

== Gymnastics ==
Portugal has entered five male and five female athletes.

=== Men ===
Qualification

| Athlete | Event | Qualification | | | | | | | | Final | | | | | | | |
| Athlete | Event | Apparatus | | | | | | Total | Rank | Apparatus | | | | | | Total | Rank |
| Athlete | Event | F | PH | R | V | PB | HB | Total | Rank | F | PH | R | V | PB | HB | Total | Rank |
|---|---|---|---|---|---|---|---|---|---|---|---|---|---|---|---|---|---|
| Filipe Almeida | Team | | | | | | | | | | | | | | | — | |
| Guilherme Campos | Team | | | | | | | | | | | | | | | — | |
| Joel Catarino | Team | | | | | | | | | | | | | | | — | |
| Marcelo Marques | Team | | | | | | | | | | | | | | | — | |
| José Nogueira | Team | | | | | | | | | | | | | | | — | |
| Total | Team | | | | | | | | | | | | | | | | |

=== Women ===
Qualification

| Athlete | Event | Qualification | | | | | | Final | | | | | |
| Athlete | Event | Apparatus | | | | Total | Rank | Apparatus | | | | Total | Rank |
| Athlete | Event | V | UB | BB | F | Total | Rank | V | UB | BB | F | Total | Rank |
|---|---|---|---|---|---|---|---|---|---|---|---|---|---|
| Mafalda Costa | Team | | | | | | | | | | | — | |
| Ana Filipa Martins | Team | | | | | | | | | | | — | |
| Maria Mendes | Team | | | | | | | | | | | — | |
| Mariana Parente | Team | | | | | | | | | | | — | |
| Lia Sobral | Team | | | | | | | | | | | — | |
| Total | Team | | | | | | | | | | | | |

== Triathlon ==
=== Men ===
| Athlete | Event | Swim (1.5 km) | Trans 1 | Bike (40 km) | Trans 2 | Run (10 km) | Total Time | Rank |
|---|---|---|---|---|---|---|---|---|
| Ricardo Batista | Men's | | | | | | | |
| João José Pereira | Men's | | | | | | | |
| João Silva | Men's | | | | | | | |
| Miguel Tiago Silva | Men's | | | | | | | |
| Vasco Vilaca | Men's | | | | | | | |

=== Women ===
| Athlete | Event | Swim (1.5 km) | Trans 1 | Bike (40 km) | Trans 2 | Run (10 km) | Total Time | Rank |
|---|---|---|---|---|---|---|---|---|
| Helena Carvalho | Women's | | | | | | | |
| Melanie Santos | Women's | | | | | | | |
| Maria Tomé | Women's | | | | | | | |

=== Mixed ===
| Athlete | Event | Swim (300 m) | Trans 1 | Bike (6.8 km) | Trans 2 | Run (2 km) | Total Group Time | Rank |
|---|---|---|---|---|---|---|---|---|
| | Mixed relay | | | | | | | |
