= Yannick Rolvink =

Dutch shot putter (born 2005)

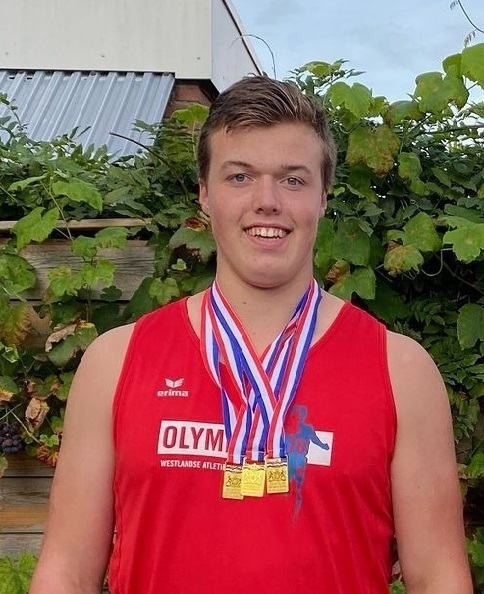

Personal information
- Born: 7 May 2005 (age 21)

Sport
- Sport: Athletics
- Events: Shot put, Discus, Hammer throw

Achievements and titles
- Personal bests: Shot put: 19.70m (2026); Discus: 55.97m (2024); Hammer: 58.79m (2025)
Medal record
Men's athletics
Representing Netherlands
European U23 Championships
Bronze medal – third place	2025 Bergen	Shot put
European U20 Championships
Bronze medal – third place	2023 Jerusalem	Discus
European U18 Championships
Silver medal – second place	2022 Jerusalem	Discus

Yannick Rolvink (born 7 May 2005) is a Dutch shot putter, hammer thrower and discus thrower. He won the national shot put titles at the 2025 and 2026 Dutch Athletics Championships and the Dutch Indoor Championships in 2026. He was a bronze medalist at the 2025 European Athletics U23 Championships.

== Biography ==
A member of Olympus '70, in 2021 Rolvink won Dutch under-18 national titles in the shot put, hammer throw and discus throw. Rolvink won the silver medal in the discus throw at the 2022 European Athletics U18 Championships in Jerusalem, Israel.

Making his debut in the shot put at the senior Dutch Indoor Athletics Championships in Apeldoorn, at the age of 17 years-old, he finished in sixth place on February 18, 2023, as his brother placed second overall. Rolvink won the bronze medal in the discus throw at the 2023 European Athletics U20 Championships in Jerusalem, fifth round personal best of 59.86m.

In June 2024, Rolvink improved his personal best in the hammer throw to 63.36 meters in Zoetermeer. In Utrecht the following week, he won the Dutch U20 hammer throw title with a throw of 66.11 meters. Rolvink placed fifth in the shot put at the 2024 World Athletics U20 Championships in Lima, Peru, with a best throw of 19.88 metres, as his compatriot Jarno van Daalen won the gold medal. Rolvink had gone into the competition as the world U20 leader with a best of 21.81m with the 6 kg implement.

Representing the Netherlands at the 2025 European Athletics Team Championships in Madrid, Spain, in June 2025, he placed eighth in the shot put with a personal best throw of 19.34 metres. Rolvink was a bronze medalist at the 2025 European Athletics U23 Championships in Bergen, Norway, landing a fifth round throw of 19.01 metres in July 2025. The following month, he won the senior Dutch Athletics Championships in Hengelo. He also placed third in the discus at the Championships. That year, he set a new Westland hammer throw record with 58.79 meters, breaking the record which had stood since 1939, held by Hans Houtzager.

In February 2026, Rolvink improved his personal best to improved his personal best to 19.70 metres in Göteborg. He then moved to fourth on the Dutch all-time list. He threw 19.53 metres to win the shot put title at the 2026 Dutch Indoor Athletics Championships in Apeldoorn.. In July he won the Dutch shot put title with 19.38 metres at the Dutch Outdoor Championships. In August, he competed at the 2026 European Athletics Championships in Birmingham, England, in the shot put.

== Personal life ==
His older brother Ruben Rolvink is a Dutch champion in discus. They are from Naaldwijk.
