= Riccardo Ferrara (shot putter) =

Italian shot putter (born 2001)

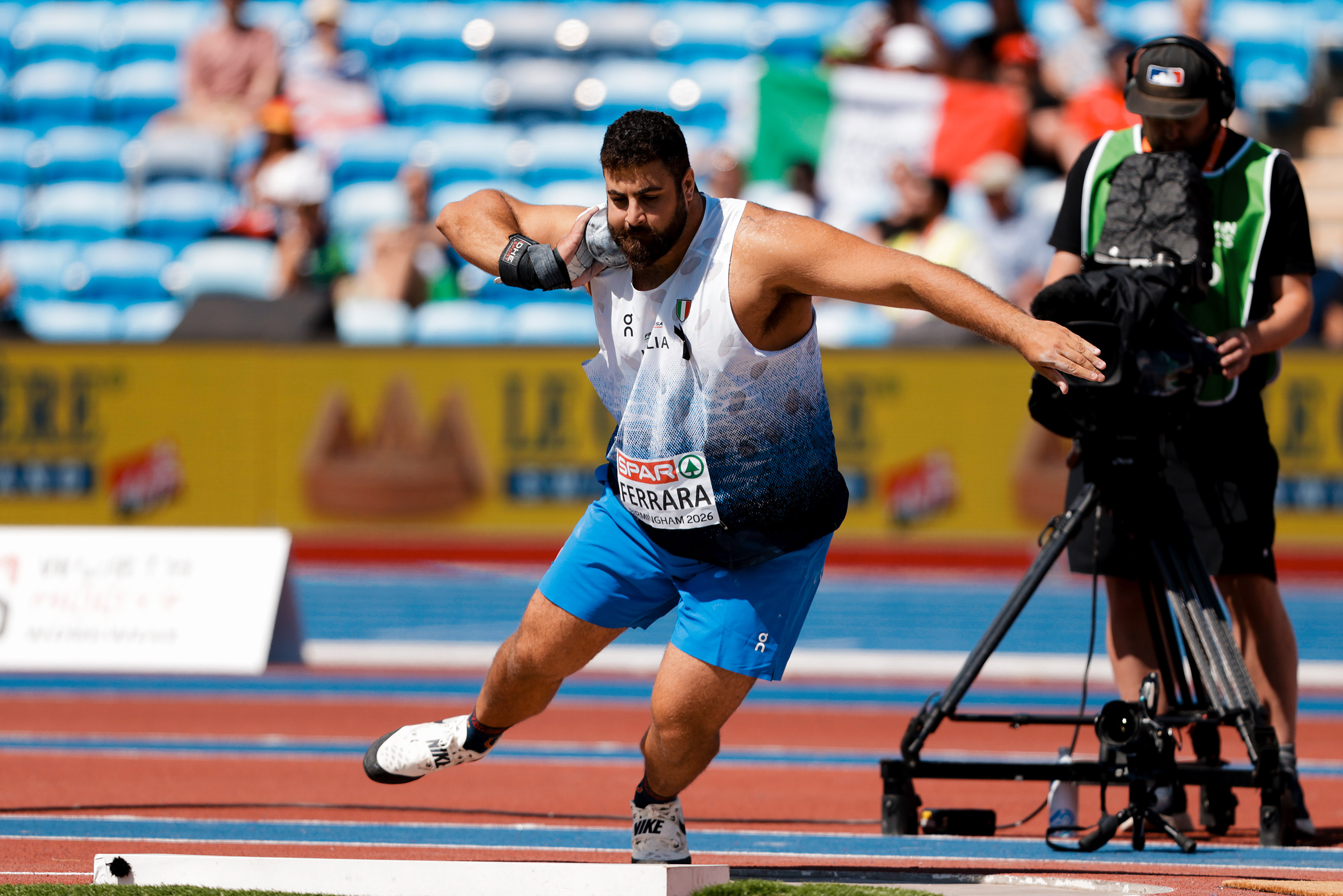
- Ferrara at Birmingham 2026

Personal information
- National team: Italy
- Born: 22 January 2001 (age 25) Reggio Calabria, Italy
- Height: 1.94 m (6 ft 4 in)
- Weight: 140 kg (309 lb)

Sport
- Sport: Athletics
- Event: Shot put
- Club: Carabinieri Bologna
- Coached by: Francesco Raneri

Achievements and titles
- Personal best: Shot put: 20.98 m (2024)
Medal record
Men's athletics
Representing Italy
World University Games
| Bronze medal – third place | 2025 Bochum | Shot put |

Riccardo Ferrara (born 22 January 2001) is an Italian shot putter who won bronze medal at the 2025 Summer World University Games.

== Career ==
He competed at the 2026 European Athletics Championships. He is among the Italian national athletics team's squad members for the 2026 Mediterranean Games.

== Achievements ==
| Year | Competition | Venue | Position | Event | Measure | - |
|---|---|---|---|---|---|---|
| 2025 | World University Games | (Germany) Bochum | 3rd | Shot put | 19.91 m | |
| 2026 | European Championships | (United Kingdom) Birmingham | Qual. | Shot put | 18.85 m | |
