= Bosnia and Herzegovina at the 2010 European Athletics Championships =

- WA code: BIH
- National federation: ASBiH

in Barcelona
- Competitors: 2 (1 man and 1 woman) in 2 events
- Medals: Gold 0 Silver 0 Bronze 0 Total 0

European Athletics Championships appearances
- 1994; 1998; 2002; 2006; 2010; 2012; 2014; 2016; 2018; 2022; 2024

Bosnia & Herzegovina were represented by 2 athletes at the 2010 European Athletics Championships held in Barcelona, Spain.

== Participants ==
Men

Event	Athletes	Heats		Semifinal		Final	
Event	Athletes	Result	Rank	Result	Rank	Result	Rank
100 m	Nedim Čović	34.89	35	Did not advance			
200 m	Nedim Čović	Did not Start		Did not advance			

Women

Event	Athletes	Heats		Semifinal		Final	
Event	Athletes	Result	Rank	Result	Rank	Result	Rank
400 m	Jasna Horozić	55.97	22	Did not advance			

== Results ==
2010 Barcelona	Gold	Silver	Bronze	Total
Bosnia and Herzegovina (BIH)	0	0	0	0
