= Nick Palmer (shot putter) =

New Zealand shot putter (born 2000)

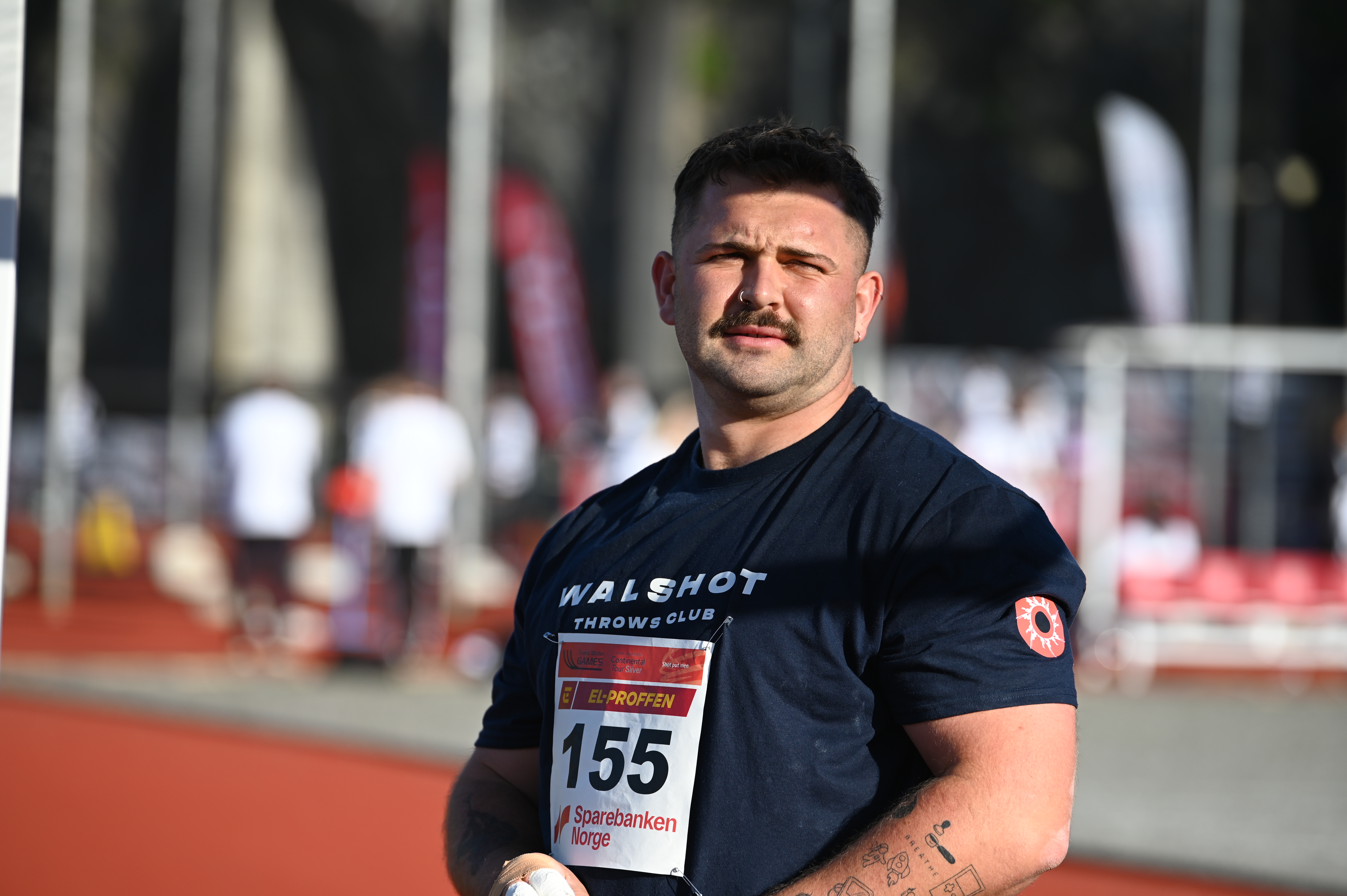
- Palmer in 2026

Personal information
- Full name: Nicholas Niel Palmer
- Born: 12 June 2000 (age 26) Hastings, New Zealand
- Height: 183 cm (6 ft 0 in)

Sport
- Sport: Athletics
- Event: Shot put

Achievements and titles
- Personal best: Shot put: 20.68m (2026)
Medal record
Men's athletics
Representing NZ
Oceania Championships
Gold medal – first place	2024 Suva	Shot put
Silver medal – second place	2026 Darwin	Shot put

Nicholas Niel Palmer (born 12 June 2000) is a New Zealand shot putter. He won the gold medal at the 2024 Oceania Championships.

== Biography ==
Palmer was raised in Hawkes Bay and was a member of Hastings Athletic Club. He later moved to Christchurch to train with Tom Walsh while also and studying psychology through Massey University.

He won the silver medal in the shot put at the 2017 Commonwealth Youth Games and he competed for New Zealand at the 2018 World Athletics U20 Championships in Finland. He added 34 cm to his lifetime best in the shot put with a 19.76m throw at Potts Classic in Hastings in January 2024. The following month, he threw over 20 metres for the first time; throwing 20.06 metres and 20.07 metres in consecutive rounds at the World Athletics Continental Tour Bronze meeting at the Ngā Puna Wai Sports Hub in Christchurch.

He received funding from the Aotearoa Athletics Trust co-founded by New Zealand teammates Tom Walsh and Hamish Kerr. Competing in Christchurch in February 2024, he became the third New Zealand shot putter after Walsh and Jacko Gill to surpass 20 metres with a put of 20.06 metres. He won the gold medal at the 2024 Oceania Championships in Suva, Fiji in June 2024, with a throw of 19.98 metres.

He set a new personal best of 20.20 metres at the Morton Games in Dublin on 11 July 2025. A few days later, he threw 20.32 metres whilst competing in Germany on 14 July 2025, adding 25 cm to his lifetime best in the space of a week. He was subsequently selected for the New Zealand team for the 2025 World Athletics Championships in Tokyo, Japan. where he finished 15th in qualifying with 20.18 metres, missing a place in the final.

Palmer won the Porritt Classic in Hamilton in February 2026 with 20.03m, and the following month placed third at the 2026 New Zealand Athletics Championships in Auckland with 20.02m. In May, he won the silver medal in the shot put at the 2026 Oceania Athletics Championships in Darwin, Australia. In June, he won the shot put at the Josef Odložil Memorial in Prague. Palmer placed sixth in the shot put at the 2026 Commonwealth Games in Glasgow, Scotland.
