= Bosnia and Herzegovina at the 2012 European Athletics Championships =

- WA code: BIH
- National federation: ASBiH

in Helsinki
- Competitors: 4 (3 men and 1 woman) in 4 events
- Medals: Gold 0 Silver 0 Bronze 0 Total 0

European Athletics Championships appearances
- 1994; 1998; 2002; 2006; 2010; 2012; 2014; 2016; 2018; 2022; 2024

Bosnia & Herzegovina competed at the 2012 European Athletics Championships held in Helsinki, Finland, between 27 June to 1 July 2012. 4 competitors, 3 men and 1 woman took part in 4 events.

== Results ==
=== Men ===
Track events

Event	Athletes	Heat		Semifinal		Final	
Event	Athletes	Result	Rank	Result	Rank	Result	Rank
800 m	Amel Tuka	1:48.31	21 Q	1:51.14	24	did not advance	

Field events

Event	Athletes	Qualification		Final	
Event	Athletes	Result	Rank	Result	Rank
Shot put	Hamza Alić	19.03	17	did not advance	
Javelin throw	Dejan Mileusnic	73.84	20	did not advance	

=== Women ===
Track events

Event	Athletes	Heat		Semifinal		Final	
Event	Athletes	Result	Rank	Result	Rank	Result	Rank
100 m hurdles	Gorana Cvijetić	14.41	28	did not advance			
