= Aiden Smith =

South African shot putter

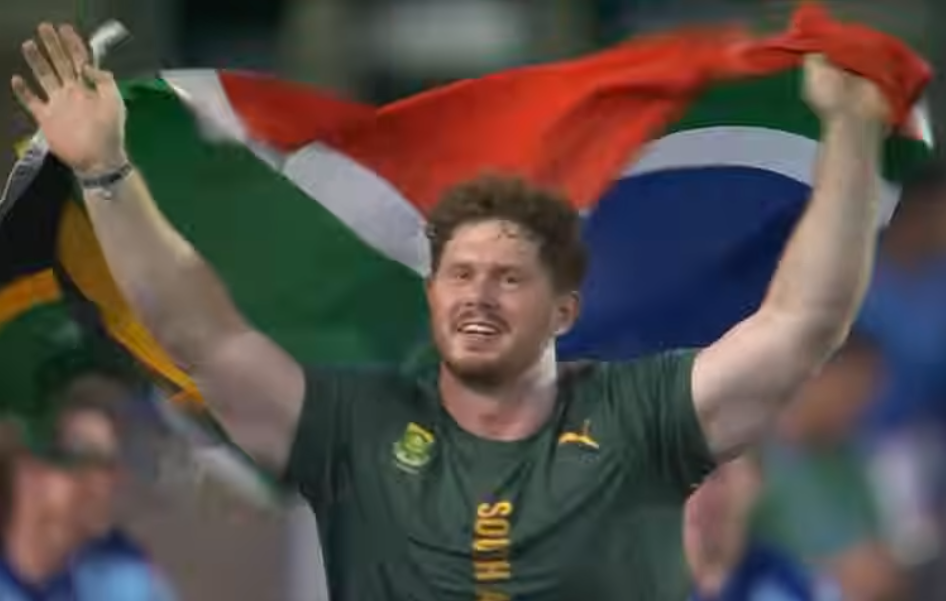
- At the 2025 Summer World University Games

Personal information
- Born: 11 October 2004 (age 21)

Sport
- Sport: Athletics
- Event: Shot put

Achievements and titles
- Personal bests: Shot put: 20.73 m (Pretoria, 2025)
Medal record
Men's athletics
Representing South Africa
African Championships
Gold medal – first place	2026 Accra	Shot put
Summer World University Games
Gold medal – first place	2025 Bochum	Shot put

Aiden Smith (born 11 October 2004) is a South African shot putter. In 2026, he became the African Champion having won South African national titles in 2025 and 2026, and the gold medal at the 2025 Summer World University Games.

== Biography ==
In March 2025, he threw a personal best shot put of 20.73 metres whilst competing in Pretoria and won the first leg of the ASA Grand Prix series. He won the 2025 South African Athletics Championships in April 2025 in Potchefstroom ahead of Kyle Blignaut with a throw of 20.31 metres, representing Athletics Gauteng North.

He threw 20.24 metres to win the shot put title at the University Sport South Africa (USSA) Championship in May 2025. In July 2025, he won the shot put title at the 2025 University Games in Germany, moving from fifth to first place with his final round throw of 20.25 metres. He competed at the 2025 World Championships in Tokyo, Japan.

In March 2026, he was selected for the 2026 World Athletics Indoor Championships in Poland, placing fifteenth overall with a distance of 19.07 metres. The following month, he won the South African championships shot put title with a 20.51m throw, and won with a 20.55 metres throw at the Botswana Golden Grand Prix ahead of Italian Zane Weir.

Smith won the gold medal at the 2026 African Championships in Athletics in Accra, Ghana with a best effort of 20.01 metres. Smith placed fourth in the shot put at the 2026 Commonwealth Games in Glasgow, Scotland.
