= Jarno van Daalen =

Dutch athlete (born 2006)

Personal information
- Born: 6 May 2006 (age 20)

Sport
- Sport: Athletics
- Events: Shot put, Discus throw

Achievements and titles
- Personal bests: Shot put: 20.76m (Lima, 2024)
Medal record
Men's athletics
Representing Netherlands
U23 European Throwing Cup
Silver medal – second place	2025 Nicosia	Shot put
Bronze medal – third place	2025 Nicosia	Discus
World U20 Championships
Gold medal – first place	2024 Lima	Shot put
Silver medal – second place	2024 Lima	Discus
European U20 Championships
Gold medal – first place	2025 Tampere	Shot put
Gold medal – first place	2025 Tampere	Discus

Jarno van Daalen (born 6 May 2006) is a Dutch shot putter and discus thrower. In 2024, he won the gold medal at the World Athletics U20 Championships in the shot put, and won the silver medal in the discus at the same Championships.

== Early and personal life ==
He is from Rotterdam. He is the son of Dutch Olympian in the discus, Jacqueline Goormachtigh, and brother of European U23 champion in the discus and shot put, Alida van Daalen. He studied technical computer science at the Rotterdam University of Applied Sciences.

== Career ==
He became Dutch U18 champion in both the shot put and the discus throw. In 2024, he became Dutch U20 indoor champion in the shot put. In May 2024, he threw a personal best 20.04 metres to win the Golden Spike event in Leiden. On 1 June 2024, he increased his personal best to 20.40 metres for the shot put competing in Groningen.

On 27 August 2024, he threw a personal best 20.76 metres to win the shot put at the 2024 World Athletics U20 Championships in Lima, Peru. Later at the championships he also won the silver medal in the discus throw. In September 2024, he was nominated for the European Athletics Rising Star award. He was named Rotterdam sports talent of the year for 2024.

He retained his Dutch U20 indoor shot put title in Apeldoorn in February 2025, with his winning distance of 20.46 metres a meeting record. He won the senior Dutch Indoor Athletics Championships shot put title later in the same month. He won two medals at the 2025 European Throwing Cup in Nicosia, a silver in the U23 shot put and a bronze in the U23 discus.

In August 2025, he competed for the Netherlands at the 2025 European Athletics U20 Championships in Tampere, Finland, winning gold in the shot put with a best effort of 21.07 metres. He then also won the gold medal in the discus throw at the championships, to emulate the feat of his sister who had both won disciplines at the 2023 Championships in Jerusalem. In September 2025, he was nominated for the European Athletics male rising star award.

Daalen competed for the Florida Gators track and field team in the NCAA beginning in the 2026 season. In June, he qualified for the 2026 NCAA Outdoor Championships. In August, he competed at the 2026 European Athletics Championships in Birmingham, England, in the shot put.
