= Polina Trifonova =

Bulgarian table tennis player

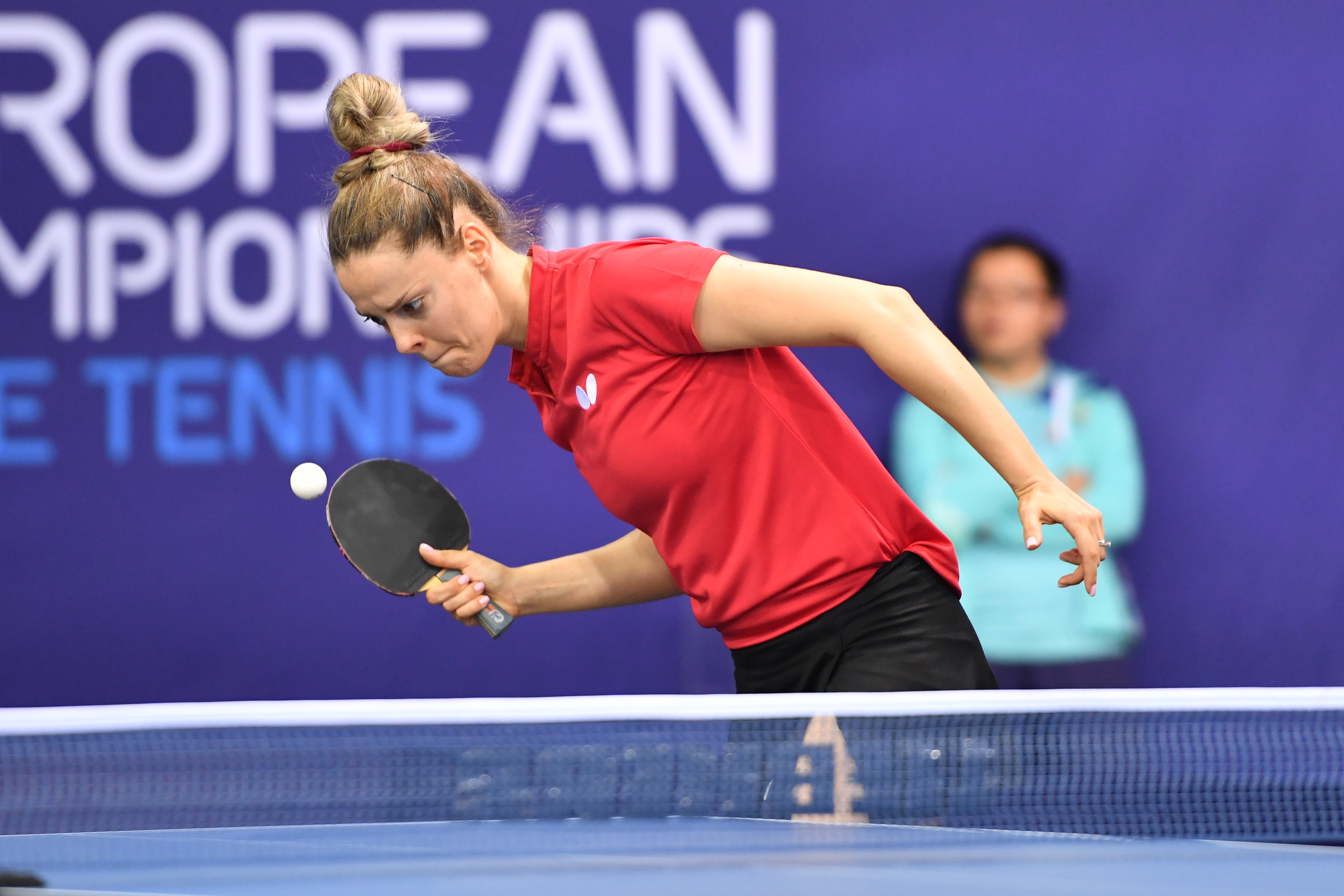

Personal information
- Born: 24 January 1992 (age 34) Kubrat, Bulgaria
Medal record
Women's Table tennis
Representing Bulgaria
Olympic Games

Polina Trifonova (Bulgarian: Полина Трифонова) (born 24 January 1992 Kubrat) is a Bulgarian-Ukrainian table tennis player. She competed at the 2020 Summer Olympic Games in Tokyo, and is now ranked 33.

== Career ==
She was 2010 and 2012 Ukrainian Table Tennis Champion. She was 2020 Bulgarian Table Tennis Champion.

She qualified for the 2020 Summer Olympics, by the European Tournament.
