= Athletic Federation of Montenegro =

Sports governing body in Montenegro

- Atletski savez Crne Gore
- Sport: Athletics
- Abbreviation: ASCG
- Affiliation: World Athletics
- Regional affiliation: EAA
- Headquarters: Podgorica, Montenegro
- President: Milorad Vuletic
- Secretary: Milan Madzgalj

Official website
- www.ascg.co.me
- (Montenegro)

The Athletic Federation of Montenegro (Montenegrin: Atletski savez Crne Gore) is the governing body for the sport of athletics in Montenegro.

== Affiliations ==
- World Athletics
- European Athletic Association (EAA)
- Montenegrin Olympic Committee

== National records ==
ASCG maintains the Montenegrin records in athletics.
