= List of Paralympic medalists in rowing =

Rowing made a debut in the 2008 Summer Paralympics held in Beijing. There are four rowing events held in this sport which are men's/women's single sculls and mixed double sculls and four coxed. The single sculls are classed as A for arms only, the mixed double sculls are classed as TA for trunk and arms and the four coxed are classed as LTA for legs, trunk and arms. So far, 96 athletes have competed within the sport since 2008.

== Medalists ==
=== Men's single sculls ===
Event	Gold	Silver	Bronze
2008 Beijing	Tom Aggar; Great Britain	Oleksandr Petrenko; Ukraine	Eli Nawi; Israel
2012 London	Cheng Huang; China	Erik Horrie; Australia	Aleksey Chuvashev; Russia
2016 Rio de Janeiro	Roman Polianskyi; Ukraine	Erik Horrie; Australia	Tom Aggar; Great Britain
2020 Tokyo	Roman Polianskyi; Ukraine	Erik Horrie; Australia	Renê Pereira; Brazil

=== Women's single sculls ===
Event	Gold	Silver	Bronze
2008 Beijing	Helene Raynsford; Great Britain	Liudmila Vauchok; Belarus	Laura Schwanger; United States
2012 London	Alla Lysenko; Ukraine	Nathalie Benoit; France	Liudmila Vauchok; Belarus
2016 Rio de Janeiro	Rachel Morris; Great Britain	Wang Lili; China	Moran Samuel; Israel
2020 Tokyo	Birgit Skarstein; Norway	Moran Samuel; Israel	Nathalie Benoit; France

=== Mixed double sculls ===
Event	Gold	Silver	Bronze
2008 Beijing	China (CHN); Zilong Shan; Yangjing Zhou	Australia (AUS); John Maclean; Kathryn Ross	Brazil (BRA); Josiane Lima; Elton Santana
2012 London	China (CHN); Tianming Fei; Xiaoxian Lou	France (FRA); Perle Bouge; Stephane Tardieu	United States (USA); Oksana Masters; Rob Jones
2016 Rio de Janeiro	Great Britain (GBR); Lauren Rowles; Laurence Whiteley	China (CHN); Tianming Fei; Shuang Liu	France (FRA); Perle Bouge; Stephane Tardieu
2020 Tokyo	Great Britain; Laurence Whiteley; Lauren Rowles	Netherlands; Annika van der Meer; Corné de Koning	China; Liu Shuang; Jiang Jijian

=== Mixed coxed four ===
Event	Gold	Silver	Bronze
2008 Beijing	Italy (ITA); Paola Protopapa; Luca Agoletto; Alessandro Franzetti (coxswain); Graziana Saccocci; Daniele Signore	United States (USA); Simona Chin; Jamie Dean; Jesse Karmazin; Emma Preuschl; Tracy Tackett	Great Britain (GBR); Vicki Hansford; Alastair McKean; James Morgan; Naomi Riches; Alan Sherman
2012 London	Great Britain (GBR); Pamela Relph; Naomi Riches; James Roe; David Smith; Lily van den Broecke (coxswain)	Germany (GER); Astrid Hengsbach; Tino Kolitscher; Kai Kruse; Anke Molkenthin; Katrin Splitt (coxswain)	Ukraine (UKR); Denys Sobol; Andrii Stelmakh; Volodymyr Kozlov (coxswain); Kateryna Morozova; Olena Pukhaieva
2016 Rio de Janeiro	Great Britain (GBR); Pamela Relph; Daniel Brown; Grace Clough; James Fox; Oliver James (coxswain)	United States (USA); Dorian Weber; Zachary Burns; Danielle Hansen; Jennifer Sichel (coxswain); Jaclyn Smith	Canada (CAN); Kristen Kit (coxswain); Meghan Montgomery; Victoria Nolan; Curtis Hallday; Andrew Todd
2020 Tokyo	Great Britain; Ellen Buttrick; Giedrė Rakauskaitė; James Fox; Oliver Stanhope; Erin Kennedy	United States; Allie Reilly; Danielle Hansen; Charley Nordin; John Tanguay; Karen Petrik	France; Erika Sauzeau; Antoine Jesel; Rémy Taranto; Margot Boulet; Robin le Barreau
