= Rowing at the Summer Paralympics =

- Governing body: FISA
- Events: 5 (men: 1; women: 1; mixed: 3)

Games
- 1960; 1964; 1968; 1972; 1976; 1980; 1984; 1988; 1992; 1996; 2000; 2004; 2008; 2012; 2016; 2020; 2024
- Medalists

Rowing at the Summer Paralympics has been part of the competition since the 2008 Summer Paralympics. Rowing as a sport has been part of the Summer Olympics since 1896 Summer Olympics. Pararowing at the Paralympics is under the jurisdiction of the International Rowing Federation (or FISA, its French acronym) the same as the Olympics.

== Disciplines and events ==
Discipline	Event	Year Introduced
Men's single sculls	AS (Arms and Shoulders) PR1M1x	2008, as A (Arms only)
Women's Single Sculls	AS (Arms and Shoulders) PR1W1x	2008, as A (Arms only)
Mixed Double Sculls	TA (Trunk and Arms) PR2Mix2x	2008
Mixed Double Sculls	LTA (Legs, Trunk and Arms) PR3Mix2x	2024
Mixed Four Coxed	LTA (Legs, Trunk and Arms) PR3Mix4+	2008

== Race distances ==
Through the 2016 Rio Paralympics all races were raced over a 1000 m straight course. Beginning with the 2020 Tokyo Paralympics, competition is raced over the same 2000 m course as the Olympics.

== Qualification ==
There is a limited number of crews permitted to race, so the International Rowing Federation holds qualification events in order to determine who competes at the Paralympic Games. At the Paralympic Games, each National Olympic Committee can only have one boat per event.

== Medalists ==
As of the 2024 Paralympic Games in Paris, the most successful Paralympic rower is Great Britain's Lauren Rowles, the only para rower with three Games gold medals, all achieved in the mixed double sculls. While a Great Britain team has won four consecutive mixed coxed four gold medals, itself a record for an individual event, no rower has appeared in that team more than twice. Five British rowers have won two gold medals.

The only non-British rower with two gold medals is the Ukrainian single sculler, Roman Polianskyi in 2016 and 2021, and who added a silver in 2024, making him the most successful male rower in Paralympic history. Australian single sculler Erik Horrie is the most decorated para rowing athlete with four medals, three silvers and a bronze, and the only medalist across four editions of the Games, but is yet to win gold.

=== Men ===
Single sculls - 2008–

Event	Gold	Silver	Bronze
2008	Tom Aggar; Great Britain	Oleksandr Petrenko; Ukraine	Eli Nawi; Israel
2012	Cheng Huang; China	Erik Horrie; Australia	Aleksey Chuvashev; Russia
2016	Roman Polianskyi; Ukraine	Erik Horrie; Australia	Tom Aggar; Great Britain
2020	Roman Polianskyi; Ukraine	Erik Horrie; Australia	Renê Pereira; Brazil
2024	Benjamin Pritchard; Great Britain	Roman Polianskyi; Ukraine	Giacomo Perini; Italy

=== Women ===
Single sculls - 2008–

Event	Gold	Silver	Bronze
2008	Helene Raynsford; Great Britain	Liudmila Vauchok; Belarus	Laura Schwanger; United States
2012	Alla Lysenko; Ukraine	Nathalie Benoit; France	Liudmila Vauchok; Belarus
2016	Rachel Morris; Great Britain	Wang Lili; China	Moran Samuel; Israel
2020	Birgit Skarstein; Norway	Moran Samuel; Israel	Nathalie Benoit; France
2024	Moran Samuel; Israel	Birgit Skarstein; Norway	Nathalie Benoit; France

=== Mixed ===
Mixed double sculls AD - 2008–2020

Event	Gold	Silver	Bronze
2008	China (CHN); Zhou Yangjing; Shan Zilong	Australia (AUS); John Maclean; Kathryn Ross	Brazil (BRA); Elton Santana; Josiane Lima
2012	China (CHN); Lou Xiaoxian; Fei Tianming	France (FRA); Perle Bouge; Stephane Tardieu	United States (USA); Oksana Masters; Rob Jones
2016	Great Britain (GBR); Lauren Rowles; Laurence Whiteley	China (CHN); Liu Shuang; Fei Tianming	France (FRA); Perle Bouge; Stéphane Tardieu
2020	Great Britain; Laurence Whiteley; Lauren Rowles	Netherlands; Annika van der Meer; Corné de Koning	China; Liu Shuang; Jiang Jijian

In 2024, the mixed double sculls was split into two events;

- the Mix2xPR2, which included most of the previous double scullers, and
- the higher ability Mix2xPR3 class

Mixed double sculls PR2 - 2020–

Event	Gold	Silver	Bronze
2024	Great Britain; Lauren Rowles; Gregg Stevenson	China; Liu Shuang; Jiang Jijian	Israel; Shahar Milfelder; Saleh Shahin

Mixed double sculls PR3 - 2020–

Event	Gold	Silver	Bronze
2024	Australia; Nikki Ayers; Jed Altschwager	Great Britain; Sam Murray; Annie Caddick	Germany; Jan Helmich; Hermine Krumbein

Mixed cox four - 2008–

Event	Gold	Silver	Bronze
2008	Italy (ITA); Paola Protopapa; Luca Agoletto; Daniele Signore; Graziana Saccocci; Cox: Alessandro Franzetti	United States (USA); Emma Preuschl; Tracy Tackett; Jesse Karmazin; Jamie Dean; Cox: Simona Chin	Great Britain (GBR); Vicki Hansford; Naomi Riches; Alastair McKean; James Morgan; Cox: Alan Sherman
2012	Great Britain (GBR); Pam Relph; Naomi Riches; David Smith; James Roe; Lily van den Broecke (Cox)	Germany (GER); Anke Molkenthin; Astrid Hengsbach; Tino Kolitscher; Kai Kruse; Katrin Splitt (Cox)	Ukraine (UKR); Andrii Stelmakh; Kateryna Morozova; Olena Pukhaieva; Denys Sobol; Volodymyr Kozlov (Cox)
2016	Great Britain (GBR); Grace Clough; Daniel Brown; Pam Relph; James Fox; Oliver James	United States (USA); Jaclyn Smith; Danielle Hansen; Zachary Burns; Dorian Weber; Jennifer Sichel	Canada (CAN); Victoria Nolan; Meghan Montgomery; Andrew Todd; Curtis Halladay; Kristen Kit
2020	Great Britain; Ellen Buttrick; Giedrė Rakauskaitė; James Fox; Oliver Stanhope; Erin Kennedy	United States; Allie Reilly; Danielle Hansen; Charley Nordin; John Tanguay; Karen Petrik	France; Erika Sauzeau; Antoine Jesel; Rémy Taranto; Margot Boulet; Robin le Barreau
2024	Great Britain; Francesca Allen; Giedrė Rakauskaitė; Josh O'Brien; Ed Fuller; Erin Kennedy (cox)	United States; Skylar Dahl; Gemma Wollenschlaeger; Alex Flynn; Ben Washburne; Emelie Eldracher (cox)	France; Candyce Chafa; Rémy Taranto; Grégoire Bireau; Margot Boulet; Émilie Acquistapace (cox)

== Medal table ==
Updated after the 2024 Summer Paralympics

Rank	Nation	Gold	Silver	Bronze	Total
1	Great Britain (GBR)	11	1	2	14
2	China (CHN)	3	3	1	7
3	Ukraine (UKR)	3	2	1	6
4	Australia (AUS)	1	4	0	5
5	Israel (ISR)	1	1	3	5
6	Norway (NOR)	1	1	0	2
7	Italy (ITA)	1	0	1	2
8	United States (USA)	0	4	2	6
9	France (FRA)	0	2	5	7
10	Belarus (BLR)	0	1	1	2
10	Germany (GER)	0	1	1	2
12	Netherlands (NED)	0	1	0	1
13	Brazil (BRA)	0	0	2	2
14	Canada (CAN)	0	0	1	1
14	Russia (RUS)	0	0	1	1
Totals (15 entries)		21	21	21	63

== Nations ==
List of all athletes that participated in all events (both men's and women's).

Event	60	64	68	72	76	80	84	88	92	96	00	04	08	12	16	20	24	Total
Argentina (ARG)														1	1	1		3
Australia (AUS)													3	3	8	8		22
Austria (AUT)															5			5
Belarus (BLR)													1	8	1	1		11
Brazil (BRA)													9	9	4	9		31
Canada (CAN)													8	6	5	7		26
China (CHN)													9	8	9	2		28
Denmark (DEN)													5					5
Spain (ESP)													1	1		5		7
France (FRA)													1	8	7	8		24
Great Britain (GBR)													9	8	9	8		34
Germany (GER)													7	6	6	2		21
Hong Kong (HKG)													1					1
Hungary (HUN)													1	1	1			3
Ireland (IRL)														5				5
Israel (ISR)													9	3	3	7		22
Italy (ITA)													9	7	7	7		30
Japan (JPN)													2	1	2	6		11
Kenya (KEN)															1	1		2
South Korea (KOR)													1	2	2	1		6
Latvia (LAT)															2			2
Lithuania (LTU)															1			1
Mexico (MEX)																1		1
Netherlands (NED)													5		3	2		10
Niger (NIG)																1		1
New Zealand (NZL)														1				1
Norway (NOR)															1	1		2
Poland (POL)													3	3	2	2		10
Portugal (POR)													1	1				2
South Africa (RSA)													5	1	6			12
Russia (RUS)													5	8				13
Russia (RUS)																6		6
Sri Lanka (SRI)																1		1
Ukraine (UKR)													4	9	8	9		30
United States (USA)													9	8	9	10		36
Uzbekistan (UZB)																2		2
Zimbabwe (ZIM)															5			5
Nations													23	23	25	25		
New Nations													23	3	6	5	37	
Competitors													108	108	108	108	432	
Year	60	64	68	72	76	80	84	88	92	96	00	04	08	12	16	20		

== See also ==
- Rowing at the Summer Olympics
- List of rowing venues - includes Olympic venues and non Olympic venues
