= Rowing at the 2020 Summer Paralympics =

Rowing at the XVI Paralympic Games
- Rowing pictogram of the 2020 Summer Paralympics
- Venue: Sea Forest Waterway
- Dates: 27–29 August 2021
- Competitors: 96

Rowing at the 2020 Summer Paralympics in Tokyo, Japan, took place at the Sea Forest Waterway, the same location as the paracanoeing events are located. There were 96 qualified slots across four events (one male, one female, two mixed events); there were two singles events (1 male, 1 female), mixed doubles and mixed fours.

The 2020 Summer Olympic and Paralympic Games were postponed to 2021 due to the COVID-19 pandemic. They kept the 2020 name and were held from 24 August to 5 September 2021.

== Qualification ==
An NPC can only allocate one boat per medal event with a maximum of four male or female rowers (excluding coxswains).

Means of qualification	Date	Qualified			
Means of qualification	Date	PR1M1x Men's single scull	PR1W1x Women's single scull	PR2Mix2X Mixed double scull	PR3Mix4+ Mixed coxed four
2019 World Rowing Championships (Austria) Ottensheim; 62 qualified slots 31 males 31 females	25 August – 1 September 2019	Ukraine; Australia; RPC; Great Britain; Brazil; Israel; United States	France; Israel; United States; Norway; Ukraine; Germany; South Korea	Great Britain; Netherlands; Ukraine; Brazil; France; Poland; China; United States	Great Britain; United States; Italy; Australia; Israel; RPC; France; Ukraine
2019 Africa Continental; Qualification Regatta (Tunisia) Tunis; 2 qualified slots 1 male single sculls 1 female single sculls	10–12 October 2019	Nigeria	Kenya	—N/a	
2021 Americas Continental; Qualification Regatta (Brazil) Rio de Janeiro; 2 qualified slots 1 male single sculls 1 female single sculls	4–5 March 2021	Mexico	Argentina	—N/a	
2021 Europe Continental; Qualification Regatta (Italy) Varese; 2 qualified slots 1 male single sculls 1 female single sculls	5–7 April 2021	Spain	Belarus	—N/a	
2021 Asia/Oceania Continental; Qualification Regatta (Japan) Tokyo; 2 qualified slots 1 male single sculls 1 female single sculls	5–7 May 2021	Sri Lanka	Japan	—N/a	
2021 Final Paralympic; Qualification Regatta (Italy) Gavirate; 14 qualified slots 7 males 7 females	7–9 May 2021	Germany	Brazil	Italy; Australia	Canada; Brazil
Bipartite Commission; Invitation Allocation; 8 qualified slots 4 males 4 females	11–25 May 2020			Canada; Uzbekistan	Japan; Spain
Total (96 berths)					

== Medal summary ==
=== Medal table ===
Rank	Nation	Gold	Silver	Bronze	Total
1	Great Britain (GBR)	2	0	0	2
2	Norway (NOR)	1	0	0	1
2	Ukraine (UKR)	1	0	0	1
4	Australia (AUS)	0	1	0	1
4	Israel (ISR)	0	1	0	1
4	Netherlands (NED)	0	1	0	1
4	United States (USA)	0	1	0	1
8	France (FRA)	0	0	2	2
9	Brazil (BRA)	0	0	1	1
9	China (CHN)	0	0	1	1
Totals (10 entries)		4	4	4	12

=== Medalists ===
Event	Gold	Silver	Bronze
Men's single sculls	Roman Polianskyi; Ukraine	Erik Horrie; Australia	Renê Pereira; Brazil
Women's single sculls	Birgit Skarstein; Norway	Moran Samuel; Israel	Nathalie Benoit; France
Mixed double sculls	Great Britain; Laurence Whiteley; Lauren Rowles	Netherlands; Annika van der Meer; Corné de Koning	China; Liu Shuang; Jiang Jijian
Mixed coxed four	Great Britain; Ellen Buttrick; Giedrė Rakauskaitė; James Fox; Oliver Stanhope; Erin Kennedy	United States; Allie Reilly; Danielle Hansen; Charley Nordin; John Tanguay; Karen Petrik	France; Erika Sauzeau; Antoine Jesel; Rémy Taranto; Margot Boulet; Robin le Barreau

== See also ==
- Rowing at the 2020 Summer Olympics
