= 2019 World Rowing Championships – PR3 Mixed coxed four =

PR3 Mixed coxed four at the 2019 World Rowing Championships
- Venue: Linz-Ottensheim
- Location: Ottensheim, Austria
- Dates: 25–31 August
- Competitors: 90 from 18 nations
- Winning time: 7:09.54

Medalists
gold medal	Ellen Buttrick; Giedrė Rakauskaitė; James Fox; Oliver Stanhope; Erin Wysocki-Jones	Great Britain
silver medal	Alexandra Reilly; Charley Nordin; John Tanguay; Danielle Hansen; Karen Petrik	United States
bronze medal	Cristina Scazzosi; Alessandro Brancato; Lorenzo Bernard; Greta Muti; Lorena Fuina	Italy

The PR3 mixed coxed four competition at the 2019 World Rowing Championships took place at the Linz-Ottensheim regatta venue. A top-eight finish ensured qualification for the Tokyo Paralympics.

== Schedule ==
The schedule was as follows:

Date	Time	Round
Sunday 25 August 2019	09:51	Heats
Tuesday 27 August 2019	11:20	Repechages
Thursday 29 August 2019	11:22	Semifinals A/B
Saturday 31 August 2019	10:20	Final C
Saturday 31 August 2019	11:48	Final B
Saturday 31 August 2019	14:25	Final A

All times are Central European Summer Time (UTC+2)

== Results ==
=== Heats ===
The two fastest boats in each heat advanced directly to the A/B semifinals. The remaining boats were sent to the repechages.

==== Heat 1 ====
Rank	Rowers	Country	Time	Notes
1	Ellen Buttrick; Giedrė Rakauskaitė; James Fox; Oliver Stanhope; Erin Wysocki-Jones	Great Britain	6:57.00	SA/B
2	Olexandra Polianska; Dariia Kotyk; Dmytro Herez; Stanislav Samoliuk; Yuliia Malasai	Ukraine	7:26.30	SA/B
3	Susanne Lackner; Hanna Moana Glade; Valentin Luz; Jan Helmich; Inga Thöne	Germany	7:28.34	R
4	Magdalena Maxelon; Daniel Bojarek; Robert Niesyczyński; Patrycja Kapłon; Arkadiusz Skrzypiński	Poland	7:46.89	R
5	Maria Dorn; David Erkinger; Tobias Höller; Johanna Beyer; Sabine Farkas	Austria	7:56.31	R
6	Kim Bo-eun; Choi Beom-seo; Kang Ise-ong; Kang Hyoun-joo; Cho Youn-hee	South Korea	8:03.07	R

==== Heat 2 ====
Rank	Rowers	Country	Time	Notes
1	Alexandra Reilly; Charley Nordin; John Tanguay; Danielle Hansen; Karen Petrik	United States	7:10.09	SA/B
2	Michal Feinblat; Simona Goren; Barak Hazor; Achiya Klein; Marlaina Miller	Israel	7:14.31	SA/B
3	Élodie Lorandi; Guylaine Marchand; Rémy Taranto; Antoine Jesel; Robin Le Barreau	France	7:15.58	R
4	Wang Xixi; Zeng Wanbin; Wu Yunlong; Feng Xuebin; Yu Li	China	7:34.10	R
5	Elfi de Jong; Minxia Peddemos; Luuk Veltink; Thom Kuus; Caitlin Smith	Netherlands	7:37.09	R
6	Haruka Yao; Toshihiro Nishioka; Ryohei Ariyasu; Maika Saito; Hiroyuki Tatsuta	Japan	7:55.54	R

==== Heat 3 ====
Rank	Rowers	Country	Time	Notes
1	Alexandra Viney; Alex Vuillermin; Ben Gibson; James Talbot; Renae Domaschenz	Australia	7:12.45	SA/B
2	Cristina Scazzosi; Alessandro Brancato; Lorenzo Bernard; Greta Muti; Lorena Fuina	Italy	7:15.55	SA/B
3	Anna Piskunova; Viktoriia Lavrenteva; Nikita Krek; Evgenii Borisov; Evgenii Terekhov	Russia	7:18.37	R
4	Angel Santos; Diana Barcelos; Erik Lima; Jairo Klug; Jucelino da Silva	Brazil	7:30.94	R
5	Angeles Gutierrez; Rocio Castro; Miguel Nieto; Pablo Ramirez; Sofia Palma	Mexico	7:58.85	R
6	Kudratulla Khabibullaev; Yulduz Musaboeva; Nigora Ganieva; Kudratbek Rakhimov; Akmal Sultanov	Uzbekistan	9:52.33	R

=== Repechages ===
The three fastest boats in each repechage advanced to the A/B semifinals. The remaining boats were sent to the C final.

==== Repechage 1 ====
Rank	Rowers	Country	Time	Notes
1	Anna Piskunova; Viktoriia Lavrenteva; Nikita Krek; Evgenii Borisov; Evgenii Terekhov	Russia	7:20.89	SA/B
2	Susanne Lackner; Hanna Moana Glade; Valentin Luz; Jan Helmich; Inga Thöne	Germany	7:26.97	SA/B
3	Wang Xixi; Zeng Wanbin; Wu Yunlong; Feng Xuebin; Yu Li	China	7:34.18	SA/B
4	Angeles Gutierrez; Rocio Castro; Miguel Nieto; Pablo Ramirez; Sofia Palma	Mexico	7:50.52	FC
5	Haruka Yao; Toshihiro Nishioka; Ryohei Ariyasu; Maika Saito; Hiroyuki Tatsuta	Japan	7:51.13	FC
6	Kim Bo-eun; Choi Beom-seo; Kang Ise-ong; Kang Hyoun-joo; Cho Youn-hee	South Korea	7:52.36	FC

==== Repechage 2 ====
Rank	Rowers	Country	Time	Notes
1	Angel Santos; Diana Barcelos; Erik Lima; Jairo Klug; Jucelino da Silva	Brazil	7:34.31	SA/B
2	Élodie Lorandi; Guylaine Marchand; Rémy Taranto; Antoine Jesel; Robin Le Barreau	France	7:35.04	SA/B
3	Elfi de Jong; Minxia Peddemos; Luuk Veltink; Thom Kuus; Caitlin Smith	Netherlands	7:35.08	SA/B
4	Magdalena Maxelon; Daniel Bojarek; Robert Niesyczyński; Patrycja Kapłon; Arkadiusz Skrzypiński	Poland	7:46.77	FC
5	Maria Dorn; Johanna Beyer; Tobias Höller; David Erkinger; Sabine Farkas	Austria	7:50.86	FC
6	Kudratulla Khabibullaev; Yulduz Musaboeva; Nigora Ganieva; Kudratbek Rakhimov; Akmal Sultanov	Uzbekistan	9:40.62	FC

=== Semifinals ===
The three fastest boats in each semi advanced to the A final. The remaining boats were sent to the B final.

==== Semifinal 1 ====
Rank	Rowers	Country	Time	Notes
1	Ellen Buttrick; Giedrė Rakauskaitė; James Fox; Oliver Stanhope; Erin Wysocki-Jones	Great Britain	6:49.24	FA, WB
2	Alexandra Viney; Alex Vuillermin; Ben Gibson; James Talbot; Renae Domaschenz	Australia	7:07.65	FA
3	Michal Feinblat; Simona Goren; Barak Hazor; Achiya Klein; Marlaina Miller	Israel	7:11.84	FA
4	Angel Santos; Diana Barcelos; Erik Lima; Jairo Klug; Jucelino da Silva	Brazil	7:13.22	FB
5	Wang Xixi; Zeng Wanbin; Wu Yunlong; Feng Xuebin; Yu Li	China	7:23.33	FB
6	Susanne Lackner; Hanna Moana Glade; Valentin Luz; Jan Helmich; Inga Thöne	Germany	7:29.45	FB

==== Semifinal 2 ====
Rank	Rowers	Country	Time	Notes
1	Alexandra Reilly; Charley Nordin; John Tanguay; Danielle Hansen; Karen Petrik	United States	6:59.37	FA
2	Cristina Scazzosi; Alessandro Brancato; Lorenzo Bernard; Greta Muti; Lorena Fuina	Italy	7:05.57	FA
3	Anna Piskunova; Viktoriia Lavrenteva; Nikita Krek; Evgenii Borisov; Evgenii Terekhov	Russia	7:08.58	FA
4	Élodie Lorandi; Guylaine Marchand; Rémy Taranto; Antoine Jesel; Robin Le Barreau	France	7:12.20	FB
5	Olexandra Polianska; Dariia Kotyk; Dmytro Herez; Stanislav Samoliuk; Yuliia Malasai	Ukraine	7:17.81	FB
6	Elfi de Jong; Minxia Peddemos; Luuk Veltink; Thom Kuus; Caitlin Smith	Netherlands	7:29.82	FB

=== Finals ===
The A final determined the rankings for places 1 to 6. Additional rankings were determined in the other finals.

==== Final C ====
Rank	Rowers	Country	Time
1	Magdalena Maxelon; Daniel Bojarek; Robert Niesyczyński; Patrycja Kapłon; Arkadiusz Skrzypiński	Poland	7:46.30
2	Haruka Yao; Toshihiro Nishioka; Ryohei Ariyasu; Maika Saito; Hiroyuki Tatsuta	Japan	7:52.72
3	Kim Bo-eun; Choi Beom-seo; Kang Ise-ong; Kang Hyoun-joo; Cho Youn-hee	South Korea	7:53.49
4	Angeles Gutierrez; Rocio Castro; Miguel Nieto; Pablo Ramirez; Sofia Palma	Mexico	7:53.50
5	Maria Dorn; Johanna Beyer; Tobias Höller; David Erkinger; Sabine Farkas	Austria	7:55.73
6	Kudratulla Khabibullaev; Yulduz Musaboeva; Nigora Ganieva; Kudratbek Rakhimov; Akmal Sultanov	Uzbekistan	10:25.07

==== Final B ====
Rank	Rowers	Country	Time
1	Élodie Lorandi; Guylaine Marchand; Rémy Taranto; Antoine Jesel; Robin Le Barreau	France	7:39.09
2	Olexandra Polianska; Dariia Kotyk; Dmytro Herez; Stanislav Samoliuk; Yuliia Malasai	Ukraine	7:43.14
3	Angel Santos; Diana Barcelos; Erik Lima; Jairo Klug; Jucelino da Silva	Brazil	7:43.53
4	Susanne Lackner; Hanna Moana Glade; Valentin Luz; Jan Helmich; Inga Thöne	Germany	7:49.21
5	Elfi de Jong; Minxia Peddemos; Luuk Veltink; Thom Kuus; Caitlin Smith	Netherlands	7:55.50
6	Wang Xixi; Zeng Wanbin; Wu Yunlong; Feng Xuebin; Yu Li	China	8:08.09

==== Final A ====
Rank	Rowers	Country	Time
1st place, gold medalist(s)	Ellen Buttrick; Giedrė Rakauskaitė; James Fox; Oliver Stanhope; Erin Wysocki-Jones	Great Britain	7:09.54
2nd place, silver medalist(s)	Alexandra Reilly; Charley Nordin; John Tanguay; Danielle Hansen; Karen Petrik	United States	7:21.61
3rd place, bronze medalist(s)	Cristina Scazzosi; Alessandro Brancato; Lorenzo Bernard; Greta Muti; Lorena Fuina	Italy	7:29.34
4	Alexandra Viney; Alex Vuillermin; Ben Gibson; James Talbot; Renae Domaschenz	Australia	7:30.62
5	Anna Piskunova; Viktoriia Lavrenteva; Nikita Krek; Evgenii Borisov; Evgenii Terekhov	Russia	7:33.71
6	Michal Feinblat; Simona Goren; Barak Hazor; Achiya Klein; Marlaina Miller	Israel	7:43.51
