= 2018 World Rowing Championships – PR3 Mixed coxed four =

PR3 Mixed coxed four at the 2018 World Rowing Championships
- Venue: Plovdiv Regatta Venue
- Location: Plovdiv, Bulgaria
- Dates: 10–15 September
- Competitors: 60 from 12 nations
- Winning time: 7:00.36

Medalists
gold medal	Ellen Buttrick; Grace Clough; Oliver Stanhope; Daniel Brown; Erin Wysocki-Jones	Great Britain
silver medal	Alexandra Reilly; Michael Varro; Charley Nordin; Danielle Hansen; Jennifer Sichel	United States
bronze medal	Élodie Lorandi; Guylaine Marchand; Rémy Taranto; Antoine Jesel; Robin Le Barreau	France

The PR3 mixed coxed four competition at the 2018 World Rowing Championships in Plovdiv took place at the Plovdiv Regatta Venue.

== Schedule ==
The schedule was as follows:

Date	Time	Round
Monday 10 September 2018	09:30	Heats
Thursday 13 September 2018	10:24	Repechages
Saturday 15 September 2018	09:30	Final B
Saturday 15 September 2018	11:15	Final A

All times are Eastern European Summer Time (UTC+3)

== Results ==
=== Heats ===
Heat winners advanced directly to the A final. The remaining boats were sent to the repechages.

==== Heat 1 ====
Rank	Rowers	Country	Time	Notes
1	Ellen Buttrick; Grace Clough; Oliver Stanhope; Daniel Brown; Erin Wysocki-Jones	Great Britain	7:09.43	FA
2	Élodie Lorandi; Guylaine Marchand; Rémy Taranto; Antoine Jesel; Robin Le Barreau	France	7:18.19	R
3	Nikki Ayers; Alex Vuillermin; Ben Gibson; James Talbot; Renae Domaschenz	Australia	7:28.48	R
4	Ekaterina Snegireva; Olga Kononova; Viacheslav Makhov; Evgenii Borisov; Polina Ruchkina	Russia	7:52.50	R
5	Kang Hyoun-joo; Sun Jin; Choi Beom-seo; Yu Gyu Sang; Cho Youn-hee	South Korea	8:04.00	R
6	Angeles Gutierrez; Miguel Nieto; Pablo Ramirez; Rocio Castro; Sofia Palma	Mexico	8:30.90	R

==== Heat 2 ====
Rank	Rowers	Country	Time	Notes
1	Alexandra Reilly; Michael Varro; Charley Nordin; Danielle Hansen; Jennifer Sichel	United States	7:12.84	FA
2	Kyle Fredrickson; Victoria Nolan; Bayleigh Hooper; Andrew Todd; Laura Court	Canada	7:23.08	R
3	Maksym Zhuk; Yelizaveta Korolenko; Dmytro Herez; Olexandra Yankova; Yuliia Malasai	Ukraine	7:37.69	R
4	Magdalena Maxelon; Daniel Bojarek; Robert Niesyczyński; Patrycja Kapłon; Ewą Obłąk	Poland	8:18.29	R
5	Subhani Pulukkutti; Ajith Palliya; Yuresh Kegallage; Herath Damayanthi; Melvige De Silva	Sri Lanka	8:55.69	R
6	Zohra Mathlouth; Hajer Dhaoui; Yassine Mersni; Mohamed Klaa; Olfa Khammessi	Tunisia	11:19.14	R

=== Repechages ===
The two fastest boats in each repechage advanced to the A final. The remaining boats were sent to the B final.

==== Repechage 1 ====
Rank	Rowers	Country	Time	Notes
1	Élodie Lorandi; Guylaine Marchand; Rémy Taranto; Antoine Jesel; Robin Le Barreau	France	7:28.40	FA
2	Olexandra Yankova; Yelizaveta Korolenko; Dmytro Herez; Maksym Zhuk; Yuliia Malasai	Ukraine	7:36.16	FA
3	Kang Hyoun-joo; Sun Jin; Choi Beom-seo; Yu Gyu Sang; Cho Youn-hee	South Korea	7:57.72	FB
4	Magdalena Maxelon; Daniel Bojarek; Robert Niesyczyński; Patrycja Kapłon; Ewą Obłąk	Poland	8:13.06	FB
5	Angeles Gutierrez; Miguel Nieto; Pablo Ramirez; Rocio Castro; Sofia Palma	Mexico	8:22.48	FB

==== Repechage 2 ====
Rank	Rowers	Country	Time	Notes
1	Nikki Ayers; Alex Vuillermin; Ben Gibson; James Talbot; Renae Domaschenz	Australia	7:20.72	FA
2	Kyle Fredrickson; Victoria Nolan; Bayleigh Hooper; Andrew Todd; Laura Court	Canada	7:25.55	FA
3	Ekaterina Snegireva; Olga Kononova; Viacheslav Makhov; Evgenii Borisov; Polina Ruchkina	Russia	7:49.16	FB
4	Subhani Pulukkutti; Ajith Palliya; Yuresh Kegallage; Herath Damayanthi; Melvige De Silva	Sri Lanka	8:41.22	FB
5	Zohra Mathlouth; Hajer Dhaoui; Yassine Mersni; Mohamed Klaa; Olfa Khammessi	Tunisia	10:41.26	FB

=== Finals ===
The A final determined the rankings for places 1 to 6. Additional rankings were determined in the B final.

==== Final B ====
Rank	Rowers	Country	Time
1	Kang Hyoun-joo; Sun Jin; Choi Beom-seo; Yu Gyu Sang; Cho Youn-hee	South Korea	8:00.08
2	Magdalena Maxelon; Daniel Bojarek; Robert Niesyczyński; Patrycja Kapłon; Ewą Obłąk	Poland	8:10.39
3	Angeles Gutierrez; Miguel Nieto; Pablo Ramirez; Rocio Castro; Sofia Palma	Mexico	8:18.27
4	Subhani Pulukkutti; Ajith Palliya; Yuresh Kegallage; Herath Damayanthi; Melvige De Silva	Sri Lanka	8:45.31
5	Zohra Mathlouth; Hajer Dhaoui; Yassine Mersni; Mohamed Klaa; Olfa Khammessi	Tunisia	10:06.17
6	Ekaterina Snegireva; Olga Kononova; Viacheslav Makhov; Evgenii Borisov; Polina Ruchkina	Russia	BUW; ~~7:47.24~~

==== Final A ====
Rank	Rowers	Country	Time
1st place, gold medalist(s)	Ellen Buttrick; Grace Clough; Oliver Stanhope; Daniel Brown; Erin Wysocki-Jones	Great Britain	7:00.36
2nd place, silver medalist(s)	Alexandra Reilly; Michael Varro; Charley Nordin; Danielle Hansen; Jennifer Sichel	United States	7:02.13
3rd place, bronze medalist(s)	Élodie Lorandi; Guylaine Marchand; Rémy Taranto; Antoine Jesel; Robin Le Barreau	France	7:04.93
4	Kyle Fredrickson; Victoria Nolan; Bayleigh Hooper; Andrew Todd; Laura Court	Canada	7:10.21
5	Nikki Ayers; Alex Vuillermin; Ben Gibson; James Talbot; Renae Domaschenz	Australia	7:13.38
6	Olexandra Yankova; Yelizaveta Korolenko; Dmytro Herez; Maksym Zhuk; Yuliia Malasai	Ukraine	7:30.10
