= Erin Kennedy =

British Paralympic rower (born 1992)

Erin Kennedy OBE
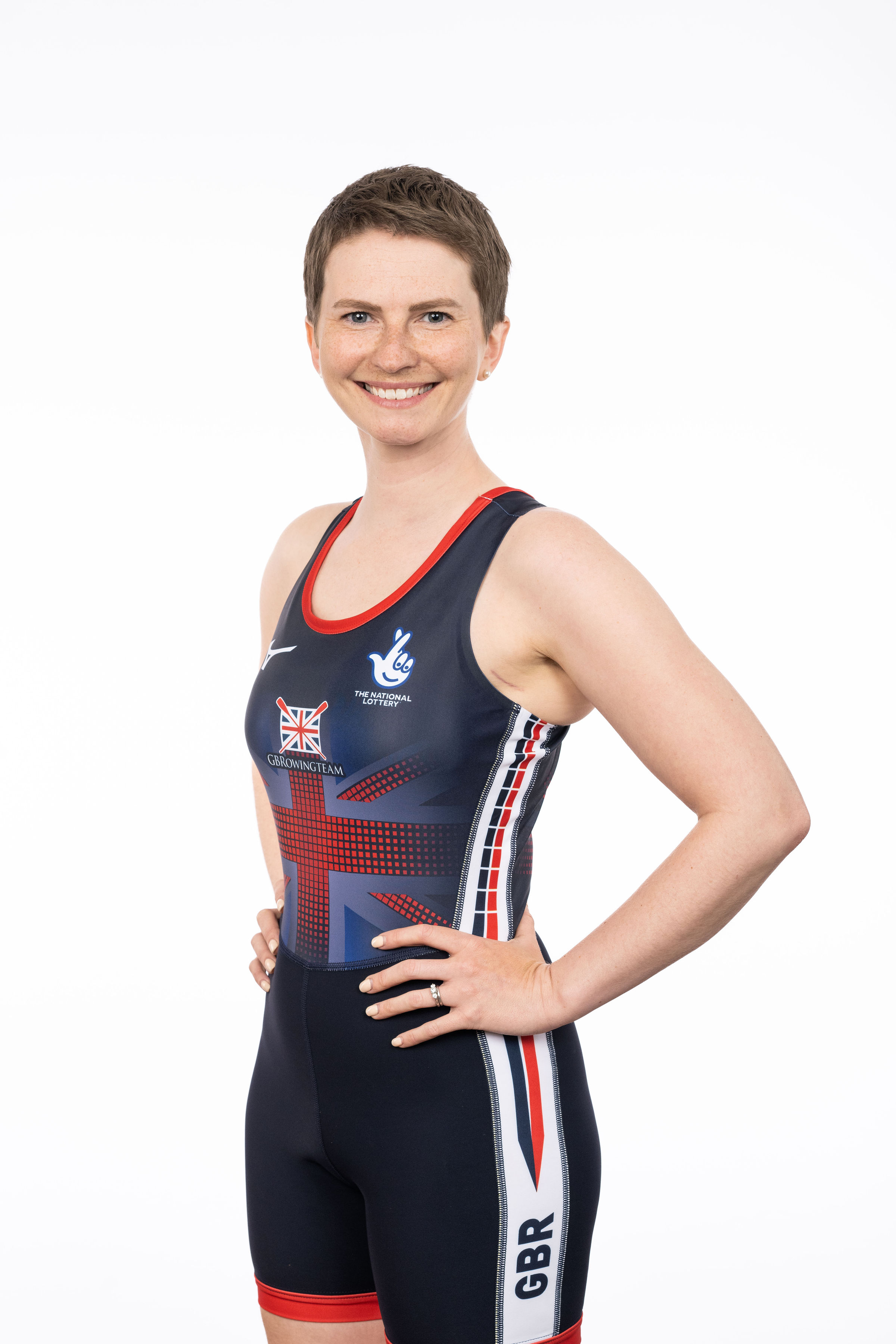

Personal information
- Nationality: British
- Born: Erin Mairead Wysocki-Jones; 5 August 1992 (age 33) Plymouth
- Education: University of Oxford
- Height: 160 cm (5 ft 3 in)
- Weight: 53 kg (117 lb)

Sport
- Country: United Kingdom
- Sport: Para-rowing
- Disability class: PR3
- University team: Oxford University Boat Club
- Club: Leander Club
Medal record
Para-rowing
Representing Great Britain
Paralympic Games
Gold medal – first place	2020 Tokyo	PR3 Mix4+
Gold medal – first place	2024 Paris	PR3 Mix4+
World Championships
Gold medal – first place	2018 Plovdiv	PR3 Mix4+
Gold medal – first place	2019 Ottensheim	PR3 Mix4+
Gold medal – first place	2022 Račice	PR3 Mix4+
Gold medal – first place	2023 Belgrade	PR3 Mix4+
European Championships
Gold medal – first place	2021 Varese	PR3 Mix4+
Gold medal – first place	2022 Belgrade	PR3 Mix4+
Gold medal – first place	2023 Bled	PR3 Mix4+
World Cup Series
Gold medal – first place	2022 Belgrade	PR3 Mix4+
Gold medal – first place	2023 Varese	PR3 Mix4+

Erin Mairead Kennedy OBE (née Wysocki-Jones; born 5 August 1992) is a British Paralympic coxswain with the GB Rowing Team. Kennedy is a three time World Champion, three time European Champion and World Best Time holder in the PR3 Mixed coxed four.

In 2022, Kennedy was diagnosed with Triple Negative Breast Cancer aged 29 and used her platform to raise awareness of early detection whilst continuing to compete for Great Britain. She competed at the 2022 Rowing World Cup in Belgrade, Serbia, winning Gold just four days after her diagnosis and won the 2022 European Championships in Munich, Germany whilst on chemotherapy. Following treatment, she returned to international competition in May 2023 and went on to retain her Paralympic Title in September 2024.

Kennedy was awarded an MBE for Services to Rowing in the 2022 New Year Honours list. She was then awarded an OBE for in the 2024 New Year Honours list for Services to Rowing and Breast Cancer Awareness.

== Personal life ==
Kennedy was born in Plymouth and grew up in Wantage, Oxfordshire. She attended King Alfred's Academy and studied History and English at Pembroke College, Oxford University.

Kennedy is married to Major Sam Kennedy, and lives in Henley-on-Thames. She is an active breast cancer campaigner and is closely aligned to the charity Coppafeel, whom she credits with her early diagnosis.

== Career ==
=== Early Career (2011–2016) ===
Kennedy began rowing at Pembroke College, Oxford, and in her third year in the sport, coxed the Blue Boat in the 2014 Women's Boat Race, winning in record time and earning a Blue in the process. Kennedy moved to cox for Leander Club, in Henley-on-Thames where she is still a member now.

=== Tokyo Games Cycle (2017–2021) ===
Kennedy first represented Great Britain in the Women's 8+ at the 2017 European Championships in Račice, Czech Republic finishing fourth. Kennedy then returned to the international stage at the 2018 World Championships in the PR3 Mix 4+, winning her first Gold with a crew of Oliver Stanhope, Daniel Brown, Grace Clough and Ellen Buttrick.

In 2019, Kennedy and her crew, consisting of Oliver Stanhope, Ellen Buttrick, Giedrė Rakauskaitė and James Fox set a new World Best Time at the 2019 World Rowing Championships in Ottensheim, Bulgaria in the PR3 Mix 4+ of 6:49.24 while also claiming a qualification place for Tokyo 2020. The crew held the Guinness World Record for the fastest row in the PR3 Mix 4+ and were featured in the 2021 Book of Guinness World Records. Kennedy was later part of the crew that broke her own world best time with a new standing time of 6:47.29 in the A Final of the 2023 World Rowing Cup II in Varese, Italy.

Following a postponement of the Tokyo Games and all international racing in 2020, Kennedy and the same crew of 2019 won the 2021 European Championships in Varese, Italy.

In 2021, Kennedy along with Oliver Stanhope, Ellen Buttrick, Giedrė Rakauskaitė and James Fox won the Paralympic Games, making it 11 years unbeaten for the GB Crew.

=== Paris Games Cycle (2022–2024) ===
Kennedy returned to international competition in May 2022, winning the Rowing World Cup I in Belgrade, Serbia with a new crew of Oliver Stanhope, Edward Fuller, Giedrė Rakauskaitė and Francesca Allen. This gold medal was the final FISA medal which Kennedy not previously won. Later, she revealed she had flown to compete the day after being diagnosed with Breast Cancer, winning a gold just four days later.

Kennedy continued with the same crew to compete at the 2022 European Championships in Munich, Germany and won her second European title whilst on chemotherapy. She revealed to the BBC that she would be taking a break from the sport to focus on her health.

In 2023, Kennedy returned to international competition exactly a year to the day after she was diagnosed with breast cancer. With a new crew of Edward Fuller, Morgan Fice-Noyes, Giedrė Rakauskaitė and Francesca Allen she won the 2023 European Championships in Bled, Slovenia. With the same crew, a new World Best Time was set of 6:47.29 in the A Final of the 2023 World Rowing Cup II in Varese, Italy.

The crew went on to win the 2023 World Championships in Belgrade, Serbia and qualify the boat for the 2024 Paris Games. The crew helped Great Britain top the Medal Table and make it 13 years unbeaten.

In 2024, there was a new addition to the crew in Josh O'Brien and the crew had a successful build up to Paris, winning Gold at the European Championships in Szeged, Hungary and also won Gold at the 2024 World Rowing Cup III in Poznan, Poland.

Great Britain set a new World Best Time in the heat, clocking 06:43.68 and booking a place in the A Final. On 1 September 2024, Kennedy's team, including Edward Fuller, Josh O'Brien, Giedrė Rakauskaitė and Francesca Allen, won the Paralympic Games representing Great Britain, ahead of the USA in second place and France in third.

== Awards ==
Kennedy was appointed Member of the Order of the British Empire (MBE) in the 2021 New Year Honours for Services to Rowing.

Kennedy was subsequently Honoured with Officer of the Order of the British Empire (OBE) in the 2024 New Year Honours for Services to Rowing and Breast Cancer Awareness.
