= Rowing at the 2020 Summer Paralympics – Mixed coxed four =

Mixed coxed four at the XVI Paralympic Games
- Venue: Sea Forest Waterway
- Date: 27 – 29 August 2021
- Competitors: 60 from 12 nations

Medalists
1st place, gold medalist(s)		Ellen Buttrick; Giedrė Rakauskaitė; James Fox; Oliver Stanhope; Erin Kennedy	Great Britain
2nd place, silver medalist(s)		Allie Reilly; Danielle Hansen; Charley Nordin; John Tanguay; Karen Petrik	United States
3rd place, bronze medalist(s)		Erika Sauzeau; Antoine Jesel; Remy Taranto; Margot Boulet; Robin le Barreau	France

The mixed coxed four competition at the 2020 Summer Paralympics in Tokyo took place at the Sea Forest Waterway.

== Results ==
=== Heats ===
The winner of each heat qualified to the finals, the remainder went to the repechage.

==== Heat 1 ====
Rank	Lane	Rower	Nation	Time	Notes
1	4	Allie Reilly; Danielle Hansen; Charley Nordin; John Tanguay; Karen Petrik	United States	7:19.97	FA
2	5	Alexandra Viney; Nikki Ayers; Thomas Birtwhistle; James Talbot; Renae Domaschenz	Australia	7:30.72	R
3	1	Michal Feinblat; Simon Goren Shtouk; Barak Hazor; Achiya Klein; Marlaina Miller	Israel	7:38.95	R
4	6	Bayleigh Hooper; Andrew Todd; Victoria Nolan; Kyle Fredrickson; Laura Court	Canada	7:43.84	R
5	3	Oleksandra Polianska; Dariia Kotyk; Stanislav Samoliuk; Maksym Zhuk; Yuliia Malasai	Ukraine	7:48.95	R
6	2	Josefa Benitez Guzman; Jorge Pineda Matabuena; Enrique Floriano Millan; Veronica Rodriguez Pulido; Estibalit Armendariz Zubillaga	Spain	8:08.53	R

==== Heat 2 ====
Rank	Lane	Rower	Nation	Time	Notes
1	2	Ellen Buttrick; Giedrė Rakauskaitė; James Fox; Oliver Stanhope; Erin Kennedy	Great Britain	7:09.44	FA, PB
2	1	Erika Sauzeau; Antoine Jesel; Remy Taranto; Margot Boulet; Robin le Barreau	France	7:26.21	R
3	5	Cristina Scazzosi; Alessandro Alfonso Brancato; Lorenzo Bernard; Greta Elizabeth Muti; Lorena Fuina	Italy	7:32.07	R
4	6	Anna Piskunova; Ekaterina Moshkovskaia; Anton Voronov; Evgenii Borisov; Evgenii Terekhov	RPC	7:36.34	R
5	4	Ana Paula Madruga de Souza; Diana Cristina Barcelos de Oliveira; Valdeni da Silva Junior; Jairo Natanael Frohlich Klug; Jucelino da Silva	Brazil	7:56.75	R
6	3	Haruka Yao; Yui Kimura; Toshihiro Nishioka; Ryohei Ariyasu; Hiroyuki Tatsuta	Japan	8:14.09	R

=== Repechages ===
The first two of each heat qualified to the finals, the remainder went to Final B.

==== Repechage 1 ====
Rank	Lane	Rower	Nation	Time	Notes
1	3	Alexandra Viney; Nikki Ayers; Thomas Birtwhistle; James Talbot; Renae Domaschenz	Australia	7:06.98	FA
2	4	Cristina Scazzosi; Alessandro Alfonso Brancato; Lorenzo Bernard; Greta Elizabeth Muti; Lorena Fuina	Italy	7:08.15	FA
3	5	Ana Paula Madruga de Souza; Diana Cristina Barcelos de Oliveira; Valdeni da Silva Junior; Jairo Natanael Frohlich Klug; Jucelino da Silva	Brazil	7:15.77	FB
4	2	Bayleigh Hooper; Andrew Todd; Victoria Nolan; Kyle Fredrickson; Laura Court	Canada	7:15.81	FB
5	1	Josefa Benitez Guzman; Jorge Pineda Matabuena; Enrique Floriano Millan; Veronica Rodriguez Pulido; Estibalit Armendariz Zubillaga	Spain	7:39.64	FB

==== Repechage 2 ====
Rank	Lane	Rower	Nation	Time	Notes
1	3	Erika Sauzeau; Antoine Jesel; Remy Taranto; Margot Boulet; Robin le Barreau	France	7:06.02	FA, PB
2	4	Michal Feinblat; Simon Goren Shtouk; Barak Hazor; Achiya Klein; Marlaina Miller	Israel	7:09.59	FA
3	5	Oleksandra Polianska; Dariia Kotyk; Stanislav Samoliuk; Maksym Zhuk; Yuliia Malasai	Ukraine	7:13.95	FB
4	2	Anna Piskunova; Ekaterina Moshkovskaia; Anton Voronov; Evgenii Borisov; Evgenii Terekhov	RPC	7:22.31	FB
5	1	Haruka Yao; Yui Kimura; Toshihiro Nishioka; Ryohei Ariyasu; Hiroyuki Tatsuta	Japan	7:52.35	FB

=== Finals ===
==== Final B ====
Rank	Lane	Rower	Nation	Time	Notes
7	5	Anna Piskunova; Ekaterina Moshkovskaia; Anton Voronov; Evgenii Borisov; Evgenii Terekhov	RPC	7:39.84	
8	2	Bayleigh Hooper; Andrew Todd; Victoria Nolan; Kyle Fredrickson; Laura Court	Canada	7:43.03	
9	3	Oleksandra Polianska; Dariia Kotyk; Stanislav Samoliuk; Maksym Zhuk; Yuliia Malasai	Ukraine	7:45.23	
10	4	Ana Paula Madruga de Souza; Diana Cristina Barcelos de Oliveira; Valdeni da Silva Junior; Jairo Natanael Frohlich Klug; Jucelino da Silva	Brazil	7:46.67	
11	1	Josefa Benitez Guzman; Jorge Pineda Matabuena; Enrique Floriano Millan; Veronica Rodriguez Pulido; Estibalit Armendariz Zubillaga	Spain	8:12.51	
12	6	Haruka Yao; Yui Kimura; Toshihiro Nishioka; Ryohei Ariyasu; Hiroyuki Tatsuta	Japan	8:36.89	

==== Final A ====
Rank	Lane	Rower	Nation	Time	Notes
1st place, gold medalist(s)	1	Ellen Buttrick; Giedrė Rakauskaitė; James Fox; Oliver Stanhope; Erin Kennedy	Great Britain	7:09.08	
2nd place, silver medalist(s)	2	Allie Reilly; Danielle Hansen; Charley Nordin; John Tanguay; Karen Petrik	United States	7:20.13	
3rd place, bronze medalist(s)	3	Erika Sauzeau; Antoine Jesel; Rémy Taranto; Margot Boulet; Robin le Barreau	France	7:27.04	
4	4	Alexandra Viney; Nikki Ayers; Thomas Birtwhistle; James Talbot; Renae Domaschenz	Australia	7:34.73	
5	5	Cristina Scazzosi; Alessandro Alfonso Brancato; Lorenzo Bernard; Greta Elizabeth Muti; Lorena Fuina	Italy	7:37.53	
6	6	Michal Feinblat; Simon Goren Shtouk; Barak Hazor; Achiya Klein; Marlaina Miller	Israel	7:51.42	
