= 2021 European Rowing Championships =

International sporting competition

2021 European Championships
- Location: Varese, Italy
- Dates: 9–11 April 2021 / 22 Events

The 2021 European Rowing Championships were held from 9 to 11 April 2021 in Varese, Italy. 18 events in rowing and 4 in pararowing.

== Medal summary ==
=== Men ===
Event	Gold		Silver		Bronze	
Openweight events
M1x	Oliver Zeidler; Germany	6:48.86	Sverri Sandberg Nielsen; Denmark	6:49.97	Natan Węgrzycki-Szymczyk; Poland	6:51.85
M2x	France; Hugo Boucheron; Matthieu Androdias	6:12.41	Netherlands; Melvin Twellaar; Stef Broenink	6:14.66	Great Britain; John Collins; Graeme Thomas	6:14.77
M4x	Italy; Simone Venier; Andrea Panizza; Luca Rambaldi; Giacomo Gentili	5:41.09	Netherlands; Dirk Uittenbogaard; Abe Wiersma; Tone Wieten; Koen Metsemakers	5:42.56	Estonia; Jüri-Mikk Udam; Allar Raja; Tõnu Endrekson; Kaspar Taimsoo	5:45.44
M2−	Croatia; Martin Sinković; Valent Sinković	6:23.37	Italy; Matteo Lodo; Giuseppe Vicino	6:24.72	Serbia; Martin Mačković; Miloš Vasić	6:25.58
M4−	Great Britain; Oliver Cook; Matthew Rossiter; Rory Gibbs; Sholto Carnegie	5:56.49	Romania; Mihăiță Țigănescu; Mugurel Semciuc; Ștefan Berariu; Cosmin Pascari	5:58.34	Italy; Marco Di Costanzo; Giovanni Abagnale; Bruno Rosetti; Matteo Castaldo	5:59.42
M8+	Great Britain; Josh Bugajski; Jacob Dawson; Thomas George; Moe Sbihi; Charles Elwes; Oliver Wynne-Griffith; James Rudkin; Thomas Ford; Henry Fieldman (c)	5:30.86	Romania; Alexandru Chioseaua; Florin Lehaci; Constantin Radu; Sergiu Bejan; Vlad Dragoș Aicoboae; Constantin Adam; Florin Arteni; Ciprian Huc; Adrian Munteanu (c)	5:31.42	Netherlands; Bjorn van den Ende; Ruben Knab; Jasper Tissen; Simon van Dorp; Maarten Hurkmans; Bram Schwarz; Mechiel Versluis; Robert Lücken; Eline Berger (c)	5:32.25
Lightweight events
LM1x	Péter Galambos; Hungary	7:01.52	Gabriel Soares; Italy	7:03.63	Artur Mikołajczewski; Poland	7:03.83
LM2x	Ireland; Fintan McCarthy; Paul O'Donovan	6:18.14	Germany; Jonathan Rommelmann; Jason Osborne	6:19.94	Italy; Stefano Oppo; Pietro Ruta	6:21.05
LM4x	Italy; Martino Goretti; Antonio Vicino; Patrick Rocek; Niels Torre	5:52.06	France; Benjamin David; Baptiste Savaete; Victor Marcelot; Ferdinand Ludwig	5:52.08	Netherlands; Koen van Brussel; Vincent Goris; Lay de Jong; Ward van Zeijl	6:01.62
LM2−	Hungary; Bence Szabó; Kálmán Furkó	6:48.48	Italy; Simone Mantegazza; Simone Fasoli	6:57.57	Moldova; Serghei Abramov; Dmitrii Zincenco	7:18.45
Para-rowing events
PR1M1x	Roman Polianskyi; Ukraine	9:22.58	Benjamin Pritchard; Great Britain	9:34.06	Marcus Klemp; Germany	9:48.27

=== Women ===
Event	Gold		Silver		Bronze	
Openweight events
W1x	Hanna Prakhatsen; Russia	7:29.76	Victoria Thornley; Great Britain	7:36.17	Jeannine Gmelin; Switzerland	7:37.10
W2x	Romania; Nicoleta-Ancuţa Bodnar; Simona Radiș	6:49.84	Lithuania; Donata Karalienė; Milda Valčiukaitė	6:53.33	Great Britain; Holly Nixon; Saskia Budgett	6:55.13
W4x	Netherlands; Laila Youssifou; Inge Janssen; Olivia van Rooijen; Nicole Beukers	6:22.82	Great Britain; Mathilda Hodgkins-Byrne; Hannah Scott; Charlotte Hodgkins-Byrne; Lucy Glover	6:23.24	Germany; Daniela Schultze; Carlotta Nwajide; Frieda Hämmerling; Franziska Kampmann	6:25.20
W2−	Great Britain; Helen Glover; Polly Swann	7:02.73	Romania; Adriana Ailincăi; Iuliana Buhuș	7:03.02	Spain; Aina Cid; Virginia Díaz	7:03.75
W4−	Netherlands; Elisabeth Hogerwerf; Karolien Florijn; Ymkje Clevering; Veronique Meester	6:27.51	Ireland; Aifric Keogh; Eimear Lambe; Fiona Murtagh; Emily Hegarty	6:27.96	Great Britain; Rowan McKellar; Harriet Taylor; Karen Bennett; Rebecca Shorten	6:31.27
W8+	Romania; Maria-Magdalena Rusu; Viviana Bejinariu; Georgiana Dedu; Maria Tivodariu; Ioana Vrînceanu; Amalia Bereș; Mădălina Bereș; Denisa Tîlvescu; Daniela Druncea (c)	6:06.67	Netherlands; Elsbeth Beeres; Nika Vos; Dieuwertje den Besten; Marloes Oldenburg; Hermijntje Drenth; Tinka Offereins; Aletta Jorritsma; Karien Robbers; Dieuwke Fetter (c)	6:09.98	Russia; Elena Daniliuk; Elizaveta Kovina; Ekaterina Potapova; Anastasia Tikhanova; Olga Zaruba; Anna Karpova; Ekaterina Sevostianova; Elizaveta Kornienko; Elizaveta Krylova (c)	6:14.40
Lightweight events
LW1x	Alena Furman; Belarus	7:41.81	Gianina Beleagă; Romania	7:45.80	Claire Bové; France	7:48.79
LW2x	Italy; Valentina Rodini; Federica Cesarini	6:58.66	Great Britain; Emily Craig; Imogen Grant	6:59.56	Netherlands; Marieke Keijser; Ilse Paulis	7:01.13
Para-rowing events
PR1 W1x	Birgit Skarstein; Norway	10:22.06	Moran Samuel; Israel	10:27.46	Anna Sheremet; Ukraine	10:46.66

=== Mixed para-rowing events ===
Event	Gold		Silver		Bronze	
PR2Mix2x	Great Britain; Lauren Rowles; Laurence Whiteley	8:08.41	Netherlands; Annika van der Meer; Corné de Koning	8:17.69	France; Perle Bouge; Christophe Lavigne	8:19.35
PR3Mix4+	Great Britain; Ellen Buttrick; Giedre Rakauskaite; James Fox; Oliver Stanhope; Erin Kennedy (c)	6:52.14	France; Erika Sauzeau; Antoine Jesel; Rémy Taranto; Margot Boulet; Robin Le Barreau (c)	7:05.26	Ukraine; Olexandra Polianska; Dariia Kotyk; Stanislav Samoliuk; Maksym Zhuk; Yuliia Malasai (c)	7:12.84

== Medal table ==
* Host nation (Italy)

Rank	Nation	Gold	Silver	Bronze	Total
1	Great Britain	5	4	3	12
2	Italy*	3	3	2	8
3	Netherlands	2	4	3	9
4	Romania	2	4	0	6
5	Hungary	2	0	0	2
6	France	1	2	2	5
7	Germany	1	1	2	4
8	Ireland	1	1	0	2
9	Ukraine	1	0	2	3
10	Russia	1	0	1	2
11	Belarus	1	0	0	1
11	Croatia	1	0	0	1
11	Norway	1	0	0	1
14	Denmark	0	1	0	1
14	Israel	0	1	0	1
14	Lithuania	0	1	0	1
17	Poland	0	0	2	2
18	Estonia	0	0	1	1
18	Moldova	0	0	1	1
18	Serbia	0	0	1	1
18	Spain	0	0	1	1
18	Switzerland	0	0	1	1
Totals (22 entries)		22	22	22	66
