= France at the 2020 Summer Paralympics =

- Flag of France
- IPC code: FRA
- NPC: French Paralympic and Sports Committee

in Tokyo, Japan August 24, 2021 – September 5, 2021
- Competitors: 61 in 13 sports
- Flag bearers: Sandrine Martinet; Stéphane Houdet
- Medals: Gold 11 Silver 15 Bronze 29 Total 55

Summer Paralympics appearances (overview)
- 1960; 1964; 1968; 1972; 1976; 1980; 1984; 1988; 1992; 1996; 2000; 2004; 2008; 2012; 2016; 2020; 2024

France competed at the 2020 Summer Paralympics in Tokyo, Japan, from 24 August to 5 September 2021.

Paris will host the 2024 Summer Paralympics, and due to that a French segment featured in the closing ceremony.

== Medalists ==
Medal	Name	Sport	Event	Date
Gold	Alexandre Léauté	Cycling	Men's individual pursuit C2	26 August
Gold	Dorian Foulon	Cycling	Men's individual pursuit C5	27 August
Gold	Alexis Hanquinquant	Paratriathlon	Men's PTS4	28 August
Gold	Fabien Lamirault	Table tennis	Men's individual – Class 2	30 August
Gold	Alexandre Lloveras; Guide: Corentin Ermenault	Cycling	Men's time trial B	31 August
Gold	Charles-Antoine Kouakou	Athletics	Men's 400 metres T20	31 August
Gold	Florian Jouanny	Cycling	Men's road race H1–2	1 September
Gold	Kévin Le Cunff	Cycling	Men's road race C4–5	3 September
Gold	Stéphane Houdet; Nicolas Peifer	Wheelchair tennis	Men's doubles	3 September
Gold	Fabien Lamirault; Stéphane Molliens	Table tennis	Men's team class 1–2	3 September
Gold	Lucas Mazur	Badminton	Men's singles SL4	5 September
Silver	Ugo Didier	Swimming	Men's 400 metre freestyle S9	25 August
Silver	Axel Bourlon	Powerlifting	Men's 54 kg	26 August
Silver	Alexandre Léauté	Cycling	Men's time trial C1–3	27 August
Silver	Sandrine Martinet	Judo	Women's 48 kg	27 August
Silver	Marie-Amélie Le Fur	Athletics	Women's long jump T64	28 August
Silver	Léa Ferney	Table tennis	Men's individual class 11	28 August
Silver	Matéo Bohéas	Table tennis	Men's individual class 10	29 August
Silver	Loïc Vergnaud	Cycling	Men's road race H5	1 September
Silver	Alex Portal	Swimming	Men's 200 metre individual medley SM13	30 August
Silver	Loic Vergnaud	Cycling	Men's road time trial H5	31 August
Silver	Dimitri Pavade	Athletics	Men's long jump T64	1 September
Silver	Riadh Tarsim; Florian Jouanny; Loïc Vergnaud	Cycling	Mixed team relay H1–5	2 September
Silver	Timothée Adolphe	Athletics	Men's 100 metres T11	2 September
Silver	Nélia Barbosa	Paracanoeing	Women's KL3	4 September
Silver	Lucas Mazur; Faustine Noël	Badminton	Mixed doubles SL3–SU5	5 September
Bronze	Alexandre Lloveras; Guide: Corentin Ermenault	Cycling	Men's individual pursuit B	25 August
Bronze	Marie Patouillet	Cycling	Women's individual pursuit C5	25 August
Bronze	Mandy François-Elie	Athletics	Women's 200 metres T37	27 August
Bronze	Alex Portal	Swimming	Men's 400 metre freestyle S13	27 August
Bronze	Ronan Pallier	Athletics	Men's long jump T11	27 August
Bronze	Annouck Curzillat; Guide: Céline Bousrez	Paratriathlon	Women's PTVI	28 August
Bronze	Maxime Thomas	Table tennis	Men's individual class 4	28 August
Bronze	Raphaël Beaugillet; Pilot: François Pervis	Cycling	Men's time trial B	28 August
Bronze	Thu Kamkasomphou	Table tennis	Women's individual class 8	28 August
Bronze	Lucas Créange	Table tennis	Men's individual class 11	28 August
Bronze	Anne Barneoud	Table tennis	Women's individual class 7	28 August
Bronze	Nathalie Benoit	Rowing	Women's single sculls	29 August
Bronze	Erika Sauzeau; Antoine Jesel; Rémy Taranto; Margot Boulet; Robin le Barreau	Rowing	Mixed coxed four	29 August
Bronze	Souhad Ghazouani	Powerlifting	Women's 73 kg	29 August
Bronze	Helios Latchoumanaya	Judo	Men's 90 kg	29 August
Bronze	Romain Noble; Maxime Valet; Damien Tokatlian; Yohan Peter	Wheelchair fencing	Men's foil team	29 August
Bronze	Gauthier Makunda	Athletics	Men's 400 metres T35	29 August
Bronze	Alexandre Leaute	Cycling	Men's road time trial C2	31 August
Bronze	Florian Jouanny	Cycling	Men's road time trial H2	31 August
Bronze	Florian Merrien; Nicolas Savant-Aira	Table Tennis	Men's team – Class 4–5	1 September
Bronze	Thomas Bouvais; Clément Berthier	Table Tennis	Men's team – Class 8	1 September
Bronze	Anne Barneoud; Thu Kamkasomphou	Table tennis	Women's team – Class 6–8	1 September
Bronze	Ugo Didier	Swimming	Men's 200 metre individual SM9	1 September
Bronze	Marie Patouillet	Cycling	Women's road race C4–5	2 September
Bronze	Alexandre Leaute	Cycling	Men's road race C1–3	2 September
Bronze	Florent Marais	Swimming	Men's 100 metre backstroke S10	2 September
Bronze	Pierre Fairbank	Athletics	Men's 800 metres T53	2 September
Bronze	Rémy Boullé	Paracanoeing	Men's KL1	3 September
Bronze	Alexandre Lloveras; Guide: Corentin Ermenault	Cycling	Men's road race B	3 September

== Archery ==
Athlete	Event	Ranking round		Round of 32	Round of 16	Quarterfinals	Semifinals	Finals	
Athlete	Event	Score	Seed	Opposition score	Opposition score	Opposition score	Opposition score	Opposition score	Rank
Daniel Lelou	Men's individual compound	680	23	Korkmaz (TUR); L 137-141	Did not advance				
Éric Pereira	Men's individual compound	655	34	Marchant (AUS); L 136-138	Did not advance				
Guillaume Toucoullet	Men's individual recurve	620	7	Phillips (GBR); L 1-4	Did not advance				
Julie Chupin	Women's individual compound	682	8	Bye	Li X (CHN); W 145-138	Paterson Pine (GBR); L 139-141	Did not advance		

== Athletics ==
Men's track

Athlete	Event	Heats		Semi-final		Final	
Athlete	Event	Result	Rank	Result	Rank	Result	Rank
Timothée Adolphe	100m T11	11.12	1 Q	11.06	1 Q	10.90	2nd place, silver medalist(s)
Timothée Adolphe	400m T11	DQ		—N/a		did not advance	
Nicolas Brignone	100m T53	15.81	6	—N/a		did not advance	
Julien Casoli	400m T54	47.99	3	—N/a		did not advance	
Julien Casoli	800m T54	1:35.38	4 q	—N/a		1:39.62	8
Julien Casoli	1500m T54	3:03.48	3 Q	—N/a		2:51.69	7
Pierre Fairbank	100m T53	15.09	3 Q	—N/a		15.41	5
Rédouane Hennouni-Bouzidi	1500m T38	—N/a				4:05.95	4
Dimitri Jozwicki	100m T38	11.30	2 Q	—N/a		11.52	4
Charles-Antoine Kouakou	400m T20	48.85	2 Q	—N/a		47.63	1st place, gold medalist(s)
Louis Radius	1500m T38	—N/a				4:17.19	7
Trésor Makunda	400m T11	51.99	2 Q	—N/a		51.74	3rd place, bronze medalist(s)

Men's field

Athlete	Event	Final	
Athlete	Event	Result	Rank
Arnaud Assoumani	Long jump T47	6.89	8
Valentin Bertrand	Long jump T37	5.80	8
Thierry Cibone	Javelin throw F34	25.69	9
Thierry Cibone	Shot put F34	10.34	8
Ronan Pallier	Long jump T11	6.15	3rd place, bronze medalist(s)
Dimitri Pavadé	Long jump T64	7.39	2nd place, silver medalist(s)

Women's track

Athlete	Event	Heats		Final	
Athlete	Event	Result	Rank	Result	Rank
Mandy François-Elie	100m T37	13.48	2 Q	13.51	4
Mandy François-Elie	200m T37	27.43	1 Q	27.34	3rd place, bronze medalist(s)
Angelina Lanza	200m T47	DNS		Did not advance	
Nantenin Keita	400m T13	57.40	1 Q	57.17	4

Women's field

Athlete	Event	Final	
Athlete	Event	Result	Rank
Gloria Agblemagnon	Shot put F20	12.62	8
Manon Genest	Long jump T37	4.40	4
Angelina Lanza	Long jump T47	5.17	8
Marie-Amélie Le Fur	Long jump T64	6.11	2nd place, silver medalist(s)
Typhaine Soldé	Long jump T64	4.60	9

== Badminton ==
Men

Athlete	Event	Group stage				Quarterfinal	Semifinal	Final / BM	
Athlete	Event	Opposition Score	Opposition Score	Opposition Score	Rank	Opposition Score	Opposition Score	Opposition Score	Rank
David Toupé	Singles WH1	Nagashima (JPN); L (6–21, 12–21)	Qu (CHN); L (11–21, 13–21)	—N/a	3	did not advance			
Thomas Jakobs	Singles WH2	Chan (HKG); L (10–21, 8–21)	Kajiwara (JPN); L (9–21, 5–21)	—N/a	3	did not advance			
Lucas Mazur	Singles SL4	Susanto (INA); W (21–3, 21–7)	Pott (GER); W (21–3, 21–7)	Lalinakere Yathiraj (IND); W (21–15, 21–17)	1 Q	—N/a	Dhillon (IND); W (21–16, 16–21, 21–18)	Lalinakere Yathiraj (IND); W (15–21, 21–17, 21–15)	1st place, gold medalist(s)
Méril Loquette	Singles SU5	Mróz (POL); W (21–16, 21–17)	Anrimusthi (INA); L (10–21, 10–21)	Nugroho (INA); L (14–21, 8–21)	3	did not advance			
Thomas Jakobs; David Toupé	Doubles WH1–WH2	Homhual / Junthong (THA); L (11–21, 19–21)	Lee / Kim (KOR); L (11–21, 13–21)	—N/a	3	—N/a	did not advance		

Women

Athlete	Event	Group stage				Semifinal	Final / BM	
Athlete	Event	Opposition Score	Opposition Score	Opposition Score	Rank	Opposition Score	Opposition Score	Rank
Faustine Noël	Singles SL4	Sadiyah (INA); L (18–21, 13–21)	Oktila (INA); L (12–21, 6–21)	—N/a	3	did not advance		
Lénaïg Morin; Faustine Noël	Doubles SL3–SU5	Parmar / Kohli (IND); W (21–12, 22–20)	Cheng / Ma (CHN); L (9–21, 10–21)	—N/a	2 Q	Oktila / Sadiyah (INA); L (9–21, 15–21)	Ito / Suzuki (JPN); L (16–21, 18–21)	4

Mixed

Athlete	Event	Group stage			Semifinal	Final / BM	
Athlete	Event	Opposition Score	Opposition Score	Rank	Opposition Score	Opposition Score	Rank
Lucas Mazur; Faustine Noël	Doubles SL3–SU5	Bhagat / Kohli (IND); W (21–9, 15–21, 21–19)	Teamarrom / Saensupa (THA); W (21–18, 21–18)	1 Q	Fujihara / Sugino (JPN); W (21–10, 21–11)	Susanto / Oktila (INA); L (21–23, 17–21)	2nd place, silver medalist(s)

== Boccia ==
Athlete	Event	Preliminaries		Round of 16	Quarterfinals	Semifinals	Final	
Athlete	Event	Opponent	Rank	Opposition Score	Opposition Score	Opposition Score	Opposition Score	Rank
Samir van der Beken	Individual BC3	Peška (CZE); L 0-5	3	Did not advance				
Samir van der Beken	Individual BC3	Legostaev (RPC); L 3-4	3	Did not advance				
Samir van der Beken	Individual BC3	Ntenta (GRE); W 4-2	3	Did not advance				
Rodrigue Brenek; Sonia Heckel; Samir van der Beken	Pairs BC3	Thailand (THA); W 4-2	5	Did not advance				
Rodrigue Brenek; Sonia Heckel; Samir van der Beken	Pairs BC3	Greece (GRE); W 4-3	5	Did not advance				
Rodrigue Brenek; Sonia Heckel; Samir van der Beken	Pairs BC3	South Korea (KOR); L 1-7	5	Did not advance				
Rodrigue Brenek; Sonia Heckel; Samir van der Beken	Pairs BC3	Great Britain (GBR); W 7-0	5	Did not advance				

== Cycling ==
=== Road ===
Athlete	Event	Time	Rank
Raphael Beaugillet	Men's road time trial B	1:01:23.32	9
Dorian Foulon	Men's road race C4-5	DNF	
Florian Jouanny	Men's road race H1-2	1:49:36	1st place, gold medalist(s)
Florian Jouanny	Men's road time trial H2	32:41.62	3rd place, bronze medalist(s)
Alexandre Léauté	Men's road race C1-3	2:11:06	3rd place, bronze medalist(s)
Alexandre Léauté	Men's road time trial C2	37:07.16	3rd place, bronze medalist(s)
Kévin Le Cunff	Men's road race C4-5	2:14:49	1st place, gold medalist(s)
Kévin Le Cunff	Men's road time trial C5	43:51.87	5
Alexandre Lloveras	Men's road race B	3:06:14	3rd place, bronze medalist(s)
Alexandre Lloveras	Men's road time trial B	41:54.02	1st place, gold medalist(s)
Riadh Tarsim	Men's road race H3	2:48:04	7
Riadh Tarsim	Men's road time trial H3	45:26.77	10
Loïc Vergnaud	Men's road race H5	2:24:30	2nd place, silver medalist(s)
Loïc Vergnaud	Men's road time trial H5	39:15.16	2nd place, silver medalist(s)
Katell Alençon	Women's road race C4-5	DNF	
Katell Alençon	Women's road time trial C4	44:18.59	5
Elise Marc	Women's road race C1-3	1:17:42	10
Elise Marc	Women's road time trial C1-3	29:18.31	12
Marie Patouillet	Women's road race C4-5	2:23:49	3rd place, bronze medalist(s)
Marie Patouillet	Women's road time trial C5	41:09.24	4
Florian Jouanny; Riadh Tarsim; Loïc Vergnaud	Mixed relay H1-5	53:03	2nd place, silver medalist(s)

=== Track ===
Athlete	Event	Qualification		Final	
Athlete	Event	Time	Rank	Opposition Time	Rank
Raphael Beaugillet	Men's time trial B	—N/a		1:00.472	3rd place, bronze medalist(s)
Dorian Foulon	Men's individual pursuit C5	4:18.274 WR	1 Q	Donohoe (AUS); W 4:20.757	1st place, gold medalist(s)
Dorian Foulon	Men's time trial C4-5	—N/a		1:05.348	6
Alexandre Léauté	Men's individual pursuit C2	3:31.817 WR	1 Q	Hicks (AUS); W 3:31.478 WR	1st place, gold medalist(s)
Alexandre Léauté	Men's time trial C1-3	—N/a		1:05.031	2nd place, silver medalist(s)
Kévin Le Cunff	Men's individual pursuit C5	4:22.257	4 q	Dementiev (UKR); L 4:27.997	4
Kévin Le Cunff	Men's time trial C4-5	—N/a		1:06.357	8
Alexandre Lloveras	Men's individual pursuit B	4:05.263	4 q	Polak (POL); L 4:08.126	4
Marie Patouillet	Women's individual pursuit C5	3:38.088	3 q	Murray (NZL); W 3:39.233	3rd place, bronze medalist(s)
Marie Patouillet	Women's time trial C4-5	—N/a		36.683	4
Dorian Foulon; Alexandre Léauté; Kévin Le Cunff	Mixed team sprint C1-5	50.344	4 q	Spain (ESP); L 49.567	4

== Equestrian ==
Céline Gerny, Anne-Frédérique Royon, Vladimir Vinchon and Chiara Zenati have all qualified to compete at the Paralympics.

== Football 5-a-side ==
Team roster

The following is the France squad in the football 5-a-side tournament of the 2020 Summer Paralympics.

No.	Pos.	Player	Class	Date of birth (age)
1	GK	Jérémy Sauffisseau	Sighted	10 September 1985 (aged 34)
3	MF	Mickaël Miguez	B1	12 January 1994 (aged 26)
4	FW	Gaël Rivière	B1	23 December 1989 (aged 30)
5	DF	Hakim Arezki	B1	20 March 1983 (aged 37)
7	MF	Babacar Niang	B1	16 November 1991 (aged 28)
8	DF	Yvan Wouandji	B1	28 April 1993 (aged 27)
9	FW	Tidiane Diakite	B1	31 December 1982 (aged 37)
10	MF	Frédéric Villeroux	B1	30 June 1983 (aged 37)
11		Khalifa Youme	B1	12 November 1982 (aged 37)
16	GK	Alessandro Bartolomucci	Sighted	4 August 1997 (aged 23)

Group A

Pos	Team	Pld	W	D	L	GF	GA	GD	Pts	Qualification
1	Brazil	3	3	0	0	11	0	+11	9	Semi finals
2	China	3	2	0	1	3	3	0	6	Semi finals
3	Japan	3	1	0	2	4	6	−2	3	5th–6th place match
4	France	3	0	0	3	0	9	−9	0	7th–8th place match

Source: TOCOG
29 August 2021
9:00

Japan	4–0	France
Kuroda 4', 9'; Kawamura 19', 27' (pen.)	Report

Aomi Urban Sports Park, Tokyo
Referee: Lucio Morgado (Brazil)

30 August 2021
9:00

China	1–0	France
Zhu Ruiming 37'	Report

Aomi Urban Sports Park, Tokyo
Referee: Stuart Winton (Great Britain)

31 August 2021
11:30

France	0–4	Brazil
	Report	Nonato 16', 26' (pen.); Jardiel 35', 39'

Aomi Urban Sports Park, Tokyo
Referee: Attila Balint (Hungary)

Seventh place match

2 September 2021
9:00

France	2–3	Thailand
Youme 29', 31'	Report	Buadee 9'; Kupan 17', 27'

Aomi Urban Sports Park, Tokyo
Referee: Attila Balint (Hungary)

== Judo ==
Athlete	Event	Preliminary	Quarterfinals	Semifinals	Repechage round 1	Repechage round 2	Final / BM	
Athlete	Event	Opposition Result	Opposition Result	Opposition Result	Opposition Result	Opposition Result	Opposition Result	Rank
Nathan Petit	Men's -81kg	Smagululy (KAZ); W 10-00	Lee (KOR); L 00-10	Did not advance	—N/a	Powell (GBR); W 10-00	Ávila (MEX); L 00-11	=5
Helios Latchoumanaya	Men's -90kg	Bye	Hirose (JPN); W 10-00	Nouri (IRI); L 00-01	—N/a	Bye	Amanzhol (KAZ); W 10-00	3rd place, bronze medalist(s)
Sandrine Martinet	Women's -48kg	Bye	Li (CHN); W 10-00	Ivanytska (UKR); W 10-00	Bye		Hajiyeva (AZE); L 01-10	2nd place, silver medalist(s)

== Paracanoeing ==
Nelia Barbosa, Rémy Boulle and Eddie Potdevin have qualified to compete at the Paralympics in the paracanoe.

Athlete	Event	Heats		Repechage		Final	
Athlete	Event	Time	Rank	Time	Rank	Time	Rank
Rémy Boullé	Men's KL1	51.726	2	48.645	1	48.917	3rd place, bronze medalist(s)
Eddie Potdevin	Men's VL3	53.216	1 FA	Bye		53.055	6
Nélia Barbosa	Women's KL3	52.234	1 FA	Bye		51.558	2nd place, silver medalist(s)

== Rowing ==
France qualified three boats for each of the rowing classes into the Paralympic regatta. All of them qualified after successfully entering the top seven for women's single sculls events and top eight for mixed events at the 2019 World Rowing Championships in Ottensheim, Austria.

Athlete	Event	Heats		Repechage		Final	
Athlete	Event	Time	Rank	Time	Rank	Time	Rank
Nathalie Benoit	Women's single sculls	11:41.75	2 R	10:56.23	1 FA	11:28.44	3rd place, bronze medalist(s)
Perle Bouge; Christophe Lavigne	Mixed double sculls	BUW	6 R	8:27.49	4 FB	9:10.85	9
Margot Boulet; Antoine Jesel; Erika Sauzeau; Rémy Taranto; Robin Le Barreau (cox)	Mixed coxed four	7:26.21	2 R	7:06.02 PB	1 FA	7:27.04	3rd place, bronze medalist(s)

Qualification Legend: FA=Final A (medal); FB=Final B (non-medal); R=Repechage

== Shooting ==
France entered eight shooters, all male, into the Paralympic competition.

Athlete	Event	Qualification		Final	
Athlete	Event	Score	Rank	Score	Rank
David Auclair	Mixed P3 – 25m pistol SH1				
Christophe Tanche	Mixed R3 – 10 m air rifle prone SH1				
Kevin Liot	Mixed R4 – 10m air rifle standing SH2				
Alain Quittet	Mixed R5 – 10 m air rifle prone SH2				
Tanguy de la Forest	Mixed R5 – 10 m air rifle prone SH2				
Cédric Fèvre-Chevalier	Mixed R6 – 50 m rifle prone SH1				
Didier Richard	Men's R7 – 50 m rifle three position				
Vincent Fagnon	Mixed R9 – 50m rifle prone SH2				

== Swimming ==
France have qualified three swimmers to compete in swimming at the 2020 Summer Paralympics via the 2019 World Para Swimming Championships slot allocation method & six swimmer via MQS.

Men

Athlete	Event	Heats		Final	
Athlete	Event	Result	Rank	Result	Rank
Laurent Chardard	100m freestyle S6	1:07.69	5 Q	1:07.60	7
Laurent Chardard	100m backstroke S6	1:20.58	7 Q	1:19.00	7
Laurent Chardard	50m butterfly S6	32.76	5 Q	32.29	4
Ugo Didier	400m freestyle S9	4:15.23	2 Q	4:11.33	2nd place, silver medalist(s)
Ugo Didier	100m backstroke S9	1:03.32	4 Q	1:02.20	4
Ugo Didier	200m individual medley SM9	2:20.86	3 Q		
Nathan Maillet	200m freestyle S14	2:04.44	16	Did not advance	
Nathan Maillet	100m backstroke S14	1:08.05	18	Did not advance	
Florent Marais	400m freestyle S10	4:17.78	6 Q		
Florent Marais	100m backstroke S10	1:01.92	5 Q	1:01.30	3rd place, bronze medalist(s)
Florent Marais	100m butterfly S10	59.23	8 Q	57.86	4
Florent Marais	200m individual medley SM10	2:27.75	9	Did not advance	
Alex Portal	50m freestyle S13	25.03	11	Did not advance	
Alex Portal	400m freestyle S13	4:11.07	3 Q	4:06.09	3rd place, bronze medalist(s)
Alex Portal	100m breaststroke SB13	1:12.14	9	Did not advance	
Alex Portal	100m butterfly S13	57.60	4 Q	57.13	4
Alex Portal	200m individual medley SM13	2:12.05	3 Q	2:09.92	2nd place, silver medalist(s)
David Smetanine	50m freestyle S4	42.68	12	Did not advance	
David Smetanine	100m freestyle S4	1:32.52	7 Q	1:29.47	6
David Smetanine	200m freestyle S4	3:14.09	8 Q	3:14.81	8

Women

Athlete	Event	Heats		Final	
Athlete	Event	Result	Rank	Result	Rank
Emeline Pierre	50m freestyle S10	29.11	11	Did not advance	
Emeline Pierre	100m freestyle S10	1:04.39	10	Did not advance	
Emeline Pierre	100m backstroke S10	—N/a		1:13.52	8
Anaëlle Roulet	100m backstroke S10	—N/a		1:10.83	5
Claire Supiot	100m freestyle S9	1:07.31	13	Did not advance	
Claire Supiot	400m freestyle S9	5:00.28	11	Did not advance	
Claire Supiot	100m butterfly S8	1:18.94	8 Q	1:16.67	8
Claire Supiot	200m individual medley SM9	2:55.56	15	Did not advance	

== Table tennis ==
France entered eleven athletes into the table tennis competition at the games. Fabien Lamirault & Thu Kamkasomphou qualified from the 2019 ITTF European Championships which was held in Helsingborg, Sweden and nine other athletes qualified via World Ranking allocation.

Men

Athlete	Event	Group stage			Round 1	Quarterfinals	Semifinals	Final	
Athlete	Event	Opposition Result	Opposition Result	Rank	Opposition Result	Opposition Result	Opposition Result	Opposition Result	Rank
Fabien Lamirault	Individual C2	Suchánek (CZE); W 3-1	Jakimczuk (POL); W 3-0	1 Q	Bye	Nazirov (RPC); W 3-0	Cha (KOR); W 3-1	Czuper (POL); W 3-2	1st place, gold medalist(s)
Stéphane Molliens	Individual C2	Yezyk (UKR); W 3-2	Toledo Bachiller (ESP); W 3-0	1 Q	Ludrovský (SVK); L 1-3	Did not advance			
Florian Merrien	Individual C3	Copola (ARG); W 3-2	Laowong (THA); W 3-0	1 Q	Andrade de Freitas (BRA); W 3-0	Zhai (CHN); L 2-3	Did not advance		
Maxime Thomas	Individual C4								
Nicolas Savant-Aira	Individual C5								
Thomas Bouvais	Individual C8								
Clement Berthier	Individual C8								
Matéo Bohéas	Individual C10								
Lucas Edouard Creange	Individual C11								

Women

Athlete	Event	Group stage			Round 1	Quarterfinals	Semifinals	Final	
Athlete	Event	Opposition Result	Opposition Result	Rank	Opposition Result	Opposition Result	Opposition Result	Opposition Result	Rank
Isabelle Lafaye	Individual C1-2								
Anne Barnéoud	Individual C7								
Thu Kamkasomphou	Individual C8								
Léa Ferney	Individual C11								

== Taekwondo ==
France qualified two athletes to compete at the Paralympics competition. All of them are confirmed to compete after entered top six in world ranking.

Athlete	Event	Preliminary	Quarterfinals	Semifinals	Repechage round 1	Repechage round 2	Final / BM	
Athlete	Event	Opposition Result	Opposition Result	Opposition Result	Opposition Result	Opposition Result	Opposition Result	Rank
Bopha Kong	Men's –61 kg	Bye	Zayat (EGY); L 10-20	Did not advance	Tokhirov (UZB); W 37-24	Khalilov (AZE); W 29-26	Sidorov (RPC); L 23-33	=5
Laura Schiel	Women's +58 kg	Martínez (MEX); L RSC	Did not advance		Ota (JPN); L WD	Did not advance		

== Wheelchair rugby ==
France national wheelchair rugby team qualified for the Games for the games by finishing top two at the 2020 Qualification Tournament in Richmond, Canada.

Team roster

- Team event – 1 team of 12 players

Squad	Group stage				Semifinal	Final	Rank
Squad	Opposition Result	Opposition Result	Opposition Result	Rank	Opposition Result	Opposition Result	Rank
France national team	Japan; W 53-51	Australia; L 48-50	Denmark; W 52-50	3 Q	Did not advance	Fifth place match: Canada; L 49-57	6

Group stage

Pos	Team	Pld	W	D	L	GF	GA	GD	Pts	Qualification
1	Japan (H)	3	3	0	0	170	155	+15	6	Semi-finals
2	Australia	3	1	0	2	156	159	−3	2	Semi-finals
3	France	3	1	0	2	151	153	−2	2	Fifth place Match
4	Denmark	3	1	0	2	155	165	−10	2	Seventh place Match

Source: Tokyo2020
(H) Hosts
25 August 2021
20:00

Japan	53–51	France

Yoyogi National Stadium, Tokyo

26 August 2021
12:45

Australia	50–48	France

Yoyogi National Stadium, Tokyo

27 August 2021
12:45

France	52–50	Denmark

Yoyogi National Stadium, Tokyo

Fifth place Match

28 August 2021
20:00

France	49–57	Canada

Yoyogi National Stadium, Tokyo

== Wheelchair tennis ==
France qualified seven players entries for wheelchair tennis. Six of them qualified by the world rankings, while one of them qualified by received the bipartite commission invitation allocation quotas.

Athlete	Event	Round of 64	Round of 32	Round of 16	Quarterfinals	Semifinals	Final / BM	
Athlete	Event	Opposition Result	Opposition Result	Opposition Result	Opposition Result	Opposition Result	Opposition Result	Rank
Frédéric Cattaneo	Men's singles							
Stephane Houdet	Men's singles							
Gaetan Menguy	Men's singles							
Nicolas Peifer	Men's singles							
Charlotte Fairbank	Women's singles	—N/a						
Emmanuelle Mörch	Women's singles	—N/a						

== See also ==
- France at the Paralympics
- France at the 2020 Summer Olympics
