= 2022 World Rowing Championships – PR3 Mixed coxed four =

PR3 Mixed coxed four at the 2022 World Rowing Championships
- Venue: Labe aréna
- Location: Račice, Czech Republic
- Dates: 19 September – 24 September
- Competitors: 40 from 8 nations
- Winning time: 6:48.34

Medalists
gold medal	Francesca Allen; Giedrė Rakauskaitė; Edward Fuller; Oliver Stanhope; Morgan Baynham-Williams	Great Britain
silver medal	Susanne Lackner; Jan Helmich; Marc Lembeck; Kathrin Marchand; Inga Thöne	Germany
bronze medal	Erika Sauzeau; Margot Boulet; Rémy Taranto; Laurent Cadot; Émilie Acquistapace	France

The PR3 Mixed coxed four competition at the 2022 World Rowing Championships took place at the Račice regatta venue.

== Schedule ==
The schedule was as follows:

Date	Time	Round
Monday 19 September 2022	11:29	Heats
Tuesday 20 September 2022	12:47	Repechages
Saturday 24 September 2022	11:40	Final B
Saturday 24 September 2022	13:18	Final A

All times are Central European Summer Time (UTC+2)

== Results ==
=== Heats ===
The best fastest boats in each heat advanced directly to the Final A. The remaining boats were sent to the repechages.

==== Heat 1 ====
Rank	Rower	Country	Time	Notes
1	Francesca Allen; Giedrė Rakauskaitė; Edward Fuller; Oliver Stanhope; Morgan Baynham-Williams (c)	Great Britain	7:14.84	FA
2	Susanne Lackner; Jan Helmich; Marc Lembeck; Kathrin Marchand; Inga Thöne (c)	Germany	7:21.56	R
3	Luca Conti; Tommaso Schettino; Ludovica Tramontin; Greta Elizabeth Muti; Raissa Scionico (c)	Italy	7:27.61	R
4	Molly Moore; Alex Flynn; Andrew Wigren; Saige Harper; Emelie Eldracher (c)	United States	7:32.87	R

==== Heat 2 ====
Rank	Rower	Country	Time	Notes
1	Jessica Gallagher; Alexandra Viney; Tom Birtwhistle; James Talbot; Teesaan Koo (c)	Australia	7:12.58	FA
2	Erika Sauzeau; Margot Boulet; Rémy Taranto; Laurent Cadot; Émilie Acquistapace (c)	France	7:15.80	R
3	Josefa Benítez; Jorge Pineda Matabuena; Enrique Floriano Millan; Veronica Rodriguez Pulidoi; Leonor Garcia (c)	Spain	7:48.88	R
4	Liliana Gallo Flores; María Xóchitl Cristóbal Aquino; Gerardo Chavez Bocanegra; Pablo Ramírez Lemus; Montserrat Ramos (c)	Mexico	8:27.64	R

=== Repechage ===
The four fastest boats in heat advanced to the Final A. The remaining boats were sent to the Final B.

Rank	Rower	Country	Time	Notes
1	Susanne Lackner; Jan Helmich; Marc Lembeck; Kathrin Marchand; Inga Thöne (c)	Germany	7:17.13	FA
2	Erika Sauzeau; Margot Boulet; Rémy Taranto; Laurent Cadot; Émilie Acquistapace (c)	France	7:26.46	FA
3	Luca Conti; Tommaso Schettino; Ludovica Tramontin; Greta Elizabeth Muti; Raissa Scionico (c)	Italy	7:29.20	FA
4	Molly Moore; Alex Flynn; Andrew Wigren; Saige Harper; Emelie Eldracher (c)	United States	7:30.56	FA
5	Josefa Benítez; Jorge Pineda Matabuena; Enrique Floriano Millan; Veronica Rodriguez Pulidoi; Leonor Garcia (c)	Spain	7:46.39	FB
6	Liliana Gallo Flores; María Xóchitl Cristóbal Aquino; Gerardo Chavez Bocanegra; Pablo Ramírez Lemus; Montserrat Ramos (c)	Mexico	8:28.98	FB

=== Finals ===
The A final determined the rankings for places 1 to 6. Additional rankings were determined in the other finals

==== Final B ====
Rank	Rower	Country	Time	Total rank
1	Josefa Benítez; Jorge Pineda Matabuena; Enrique Floriano Millan; Veronica Rodriguez Pulidoi; Leonor Garcia (c)	Spain	7:39.49	7
2	Liliana Gallo Flores; María Xóchitl Cristóbal Aquino; Gerardo Chavez Bocanegra; Pablo Ramírez Lemus; Montserrat Ramos (c)	Mexico	8:17.87	8

==== Final A ====
Rank	Rower	Country	Time	Notes
1st place, gold medalist(s)	Francesca Allen; Giedrė Rakauskaitė; Edward Fuller; Oliver Stanhope; Morgan Baynham-Williams (c)	Great Britain	6:48.34	
2nd place, silver medalist(s)	Susanne Lackner; Jan Helmich; Marc Lembeck; Kathrin Marchand; Inga Thöne (c)	Germany	7:06.94	
3rd place, bronze medalist(s)	Erika Sauzeau; Margot Boulet; Rémy Taranto; Laurent Cadot; Émilie Acquistapace (c)	France	7:11.41	
4	Jessica Gallagher; Alexandra Viney; Tom Birtwhistle; James Talbot; Teesaan Koo (c)	Australia	7:13.98	
5	Molly Moore; Alex Flynn; Andrew Wigren; Saige Harper; Emelie Eldracher (c)	United States	7:25.70	
6	Luca Conti; Tommaso Schettino; Ludovica Tramontin; Greta Elizabeth Muti; Raissa Scionico (c)	Italy	7:34.03	
