= 2016 World Rowing Championships – LTA Mixed double sculls =

LTA Mixed double sculls at the 2016 World Rowing Championships
- Venue: Willem-Alexander Baan
- Location: Rotterdam, Netherlands
- Dates: 22–27 August
- Competitors: 8 from 4 nations
- Winning time: 8:38.53

Medalists
gold medal	Guylaine Marchand; Fabien Saint-Lannes	France
silver medal	Johanna Beyer; Rainer Putz	Austria
bronze medal	Valentina Zhagot; Evgenii Borisov	Russia

The LTA mixed double sculls competition at the 2016 World Rowing Championships in Rotterdam took place at the Willem-Alexander Baan.

== Schedule ==
The schedule was as follows:

Date	Time	Round
Monday 22 August 2016	16:05	Exhibition race
Saturday 27 August 2016	11:40	Final

All times are Central European Summer Time (UTC+2)

== Results ==
=== Exhibition race ===
With fewer than seven entries in this event, boats contested a race for lanes before the final.

Rank	Rowers	Country	Time
1	Guylaine Marchand; Fabien Saint-Lannes	France	7:51.11
2	Johanna Beyer; Rainer Putz	Austria	8:13.29
3	Valentina Zhagot; Evgenii Borisov	Russia	8:44.43
4	Kathrin Heyder; Leopold Reimann	Germany	9:42.04

=== Final ===
The final determined the rankings.

Rank	Rowers	Country	Time
1st place, gold medalist(s)	Guylaine Marchand; Fabien Saint-Lannes	France	8:38.53
2nd place, silver medalist(s)	Johanna Beyer; Rainer Putz	Austria	9:06.51
3rd place, bronze medalist(s)	Valentina Zhagot; Evgenii Borisov	Russia	9:27.74
4	Kathrin Heyder; Leopold Reimann	Germany	11:12.54
