= Lorenzo Bernard =

Italian para-cyclist (born 1997)

Personal information
- Nationality: Italian
- Born: 25 March 1997 (age 29) Susa, Piedmont

Sport
- Sport: Pararowing; Para-cycling
- Disability class: B
Medal record
Representing Italy
Men's para-cycling
Paralympic Games
Bronze medal – third place	2024 Paris	Individual pursuit B
Track World Championships
Silver medal – second place	2025 Rio de Janeiro	Individual pursuit B
Bronze medal – third place	2024 Rio de Janeiro	Individual pursuit B
Pararowing
World Championships
Bronze medal – third place	2019 Ottensheim	PR3 Mixed 4+
European Championships
Gold medal – first place	2020 Poznan	PR3 Mixed 4+

Lorenzo Bernard (born 25 March 1997) is an Italian para-cyclist and pararower.

== Career ==
Bernard began his career as a pararower and represented Italy at the 2020 European Rowing Championships and won a gold medal in the PR3 mixed coxed four event. He then represented Italy at the 2020 Summer Paralympics and finished in fifth place in the mixed coxed four event. Following the 2020 Summer Paralympics he switched to para-cycling.

He represented Italy at the 2024 UCI Para-cycling Track World Championships and won a bronze medal in the individual pursuit event. He represented Italy at the 2024 Summer Paralympics and won a bronze medal in the individual pursuit B event, Italy's first medal of the 2024 Summer Paralympics.

== Personal life ==
Bernard was injured in 2013 when a World War II hand grenade, mistaken for a cemetery light, exploded and made him blind.
