= Frankie Allen (rower) =

British rower (born 2002)

Personal information
- Full name: Francesca Allen
- Born: 26 May 2002 (age 24) Wallingford, Oxfordshire, England

Sport
- Sport: Para-rowing
- Disability: Erb's palsy
- Disability class: PR3
- Club: Oxford Brookes University Boat Club
Medal record
Para-rowing
Representing Great Britain
Paralympic Games
Gold medal – first place	2024 Paris	PR3 mixed coxed four
World Championships
Gold medal – first place	2022 Racice	PR3Mix4+
Gold medal – first place	2022 Racice	PR3W2-
Gold medal – first place	2023 Belgrade	PR3Mix4+
Gold medal – first place	2025 Shanghai	PR3Mix4+
Silver medal – second place	2026 Amsterdam	PR3Mix4+
European Championships
Gold medal – first place	2022 Munich	PR3Mix4+
Gold medal – first place	2023 Bled	PR3Mix4+
Gold medal – first place	2024 Szeged	PR3Mix4+
Gold medal – first place	2026 Varese	PR3Mix4+

Francesca Elisabeth Allen MBE (born 26 May 2002) is a British adaptive rower who competes in international rowing competitions. She is a three-time World champion and three-time European champion in the mixed coxed four. She was on Great Britain's gold medal-winning team at the 2024 Summer Paralympics.

== Early life and education ==
Allen is from Wallingford, Oxfordshire and was born with Erb’s Palsy. She began rowing at age 12, on the river at Henley-On-Thames on a boat called ‘Tinkerbelle’. She attended Pangbourne College and, later, Oxford Brookes University, where she was studying for a BSc in physiotherapy.

== Career ==
Allen rowed for Pangbourne College, under coach, Richard Follett, where she was the head of girls boats. She then rowed for the Oxford Brookes University Boat Club.

In 2022, shortly after beginning university, Allen joined Great Britain's PR3 mixed coxed four. At the 2022 World Rowing Championships, Allen won gold in the PR3 mixed coxed four and, with Giedre Rakauskaite, PR3 W2-. This made her the first woman to win two world championship titles in the same regatta. With Erin Kennedy (cox), Rakauskaite, Ed Fuller, and Morgan Fice-Noyes, Allen won gold in PR3 mixed coxed four at the 2023 European Championships. The team won gold again at the 2023 World Rowing Championships in Belgrade.

With Kennedy (cox), Rakauskaite, Fuller, and Josh O’Brien, Allen won gold in PR3 mixed coxed four at the 2024 European Championships. At the 2024 Summer Paralympics, the team rowed a new world best time of 6:43.68 and won gold in PR3 mixed coxed four. The victory marked Britain's PR3 mixed coxed four's 25th consecutive world title since 2010.
