= Michal Feinblat =

Israeli judoka

Personal information
- Native name: מיכל פיינבלט
- Born: 26 August 1984 (age 41) Bnei Brak, Israel
- Occupation: Judoka
- Height: 1.62 m (5 ft 4 in)

Sport
- Country: Israel
- Sport: Judo
- Weight class: ‍–‍52 kg
- Rank: 3rd dan black belt

Achievements and titles
- Olympic Games: R16 (2004)
- World Champ.: 7th (2003)
- European Champ.: 9th (2005)
Medal record
Women's judo
Representing Israel
European Junior Championships
Bronze medal – third place	2002 Rotterdam	‍–‍52 kg
Bronze medal – third place	2003 Sarajevo	‍–‍52 kg

Profile at external databases
- IJF: 19087
- JudoInside.com: 12963
- Updated on 21 August 2023

Michal Feinblat (Hebrew: מיכל פיינבלט; born 26 August 1984 in Bnei Brak) is an Israeli judoka who competed in the women's half-lightweight category. She held five Israeli senior titles in her division between 2000 and 2004, picked up a total of eleven medals in her career, and represented her nation Israel at the 2004 Summer Olympics, competing in the women's 52 kg.

Feinblat qualified as a lone female judoka for the Israeli squad in the women's half-lightweight class (52 kg) at the 2004 Summer Olympics in Athens, based on her ranking in the European top 5 under her respective category from the International Judo Federation. She received a bye in the first round, but lost her opening match to Portugal's Telma Monteiro, who scored an ippon victory and threw her down the tatami with a kuchiki taoshi (single leg takedown) assault at three minutes and forty-three seconds.

In 2007, during training, she injured her shoulder and had surgery but was unable to return to Judo. In 2016, she joined the Israeli Paralympic rowing team and competed in the Mixed coxed four category. They competed at the 2020 Summer Paralympics and finished 6th in the mixed coxed four event.
