= Zeng Wanbin =

Chinese disabled athlete (born 2001)

Personal information
- Born: 10 December 2001 (age 24) Ji'an, China

Sport
- Sport: Adaptive rowing
Medal record
Representing China
World Rowing Championships
Silver medal – second place	2025 Shanghai	PR3 Mixed coxed four
Asian Para Games
Gold medal – first place	2022 Hangzhou	PR3 Mixed coxed four

Zeng Wanbin (born 10 December 2001) is a Chinese Paralympic rower who competes in international rowing competitions. She is a World silver medalist and Asian Para Games champion in coxed fours, she also competed at the 2024 Summer Paralympics.
