= Emelie Eldracher =

American Paralympic rower

Personal information
- Born: September 16, 1999 (age 26)
- Home town: Andover, Massachusetts, U.S.
- Education: MIT
- Height: 5 ft 4 in (163 cm)
- Weight: 100 lb (45 kg)

Sport
- Country: United States
- Sport: Para-rowing
- Disability class: PR3
Medal record
Para-rowing
Representing the United States
Paralympic Games
Silver medal – second place	2024 Paris	PR3 Mix4+

Emelie Eldracher (born September 16, 1999) is an American pararower. She represented the United States at the 2024 Summer Paralympics as the coxswain of the mixed coxed four rowing team as the only non-disabled member of the team.

== Early life and education ==
Eldracher was first introduced to rowing in her freshman year of high school at Phillips Academy in Andover, Massachusetts. She also participated in springboard diving in high school before committing to rowing in college. She was a member of the rowing team at MIT, where she was also studying for a Master of Engineering degree in Computation and Cognition.

== Career ==
She was selected to represent the United States at the 2024 Summer Paralympics. She participated in the PR3 mixed coxed four event, where she won a silver medal with the United States team.
