= Émilie Acquistapace =

French Paralympic rower

Personal information
- Born: 8 August 1988 (age 37)
- Height: 162 cm (5 ft 4 in)
- Weight: 50 kg (110 lb)

Sport
- Country: France
- Sport: Pararowing
- Disability class: PR3
Medal record
Pararowing
Representing France
Paralympic Games
Bronze medal – third place	2024 Paris	PR3 Mix4+
World Championships
Bronze medal – third place	2022 Račice	PR3 Mix4+
European Championships
Silver medal – second place	2024 Szeged	PR3 Mix4+
Bronze medal – third place	2023 Bled	PR3 Mix4+

Émilie Acquistapace (born 8 August 1988) is a French pararower. She represented France at the 2024 Summer Paralympics as the coxswain.

== Career ==
Acquistapace represented France at the 2024 Summer Paralympics and won a bronze medal in the mixed cox four event, where she served as the coxswain.
