= Erika Sauzeau =

French rower (born 1982)

Personal information
- Born: 1 August 1982 (age 43) Montdidier, Somme, France

Sport
- Country: France
- Sport: Adaptive rowing
Medal record
Pararowing
Representing France
Paralympic Games
Bronze medal – third place	2020 Tokyo	PR3 mixed coxed four
World Championships
Bronze medal – third place	2022 Račice	PR3 mixed coxed four
European Championships
Silver medal – second place	2021 Varese	PR3 mixed coxed four
Silver medal – second place	2022 Munich	PR3 mixed coxed four
Bronze medal – third place	2023 Bled	PR3 mixed coxed four

Erika Sauzeau (born 1 August 1982) is a French adaptive rower who competes at international rowing competitions. She is a European silver medalist and a Paralympic bronze medalist in the mixed coxed four.
