= Danielle Hansen =

American Paralympic rower

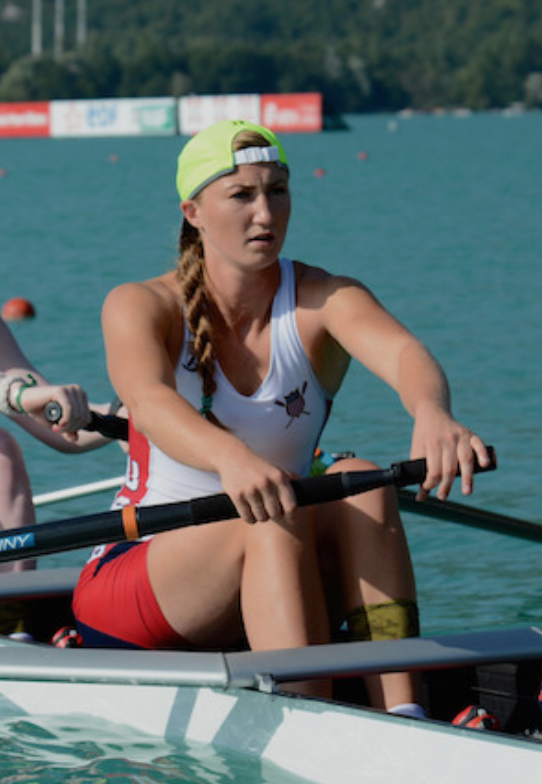
- Hansen competing at the 2015 World Rowing Championships

Personal information
- National team: United States
- Born: October 16, 1993 (age 32) Modesto, CA
- Height: 6 ft 1 in (185 cm)
- Weight: 160 lb (73 kg)

Sport
- Sport: rowing
- College team: University of Washington
- Club: Community Rowing Inc.
Medal record
Legs, Trunk, & Arms Mixed Four
Representing the United States
| Event | 1st | 2nd | 3rd |
|---|---|---|---|
| Paralympic Games | 0 | 2 | 0 |
| World Championships | 0 | 5 | 0 |
| Head of the Charles Regatta | 4 | 0 | 0 |
| Royal Canadian Henley Regatta | 1 | 0 | 0 |
| Total | 5 | 6 | 0 |
Paralympic Games
| Silver medal – second place | 2016 Rio de Janeiro | PR3 Mix4+ |
| Silver medal – second place | 2020 Tokyo | PR3 Mix4+ |
World Championships
| Silver medal – second place | 2019 Ottensheim | PR3 Mixed Four |
| Silver medal – second place | 2018 Plovdiv | PR3 Mixed Four |
| Silver medal – second place | 2017 Sarasota | PR3 Mixed Four |
| Silver medal – second place | 2015 Aiguebelette | Legs, Trunk, & Arms Mixed Four |
| Silver medal – second place | 2014 Amsterdam | Legs, Trunk, & Arms Mixed Four |
Royal Canadian Henley Regatta
| Gold medal – first place | 2015 St. Catharines | Legs, Trunk, & Arms Mixed Four |
U.S. Rowing Club & Elite National Championships
| Gold medal – first place | 2017 Harsha Lake | Legs, Trunk, & Arms Mixed Four |
| Gold medal – first place | 2017 Harsha Lake | Legs, Trunk, & Arms Mixed Doubles |
| Silver medal – second place | 2017 Harsha Lake | Women's Elite/Senior Pair |
Head of the Charles Regatta
| Gold medal – first place | 2017 Boston | Legs, Trunk, & Arms Mixed Four |
| Gold medal – first place | 2016 Boston | Mixed Eight |
| Gold medal – first place | 2016 Boston | Legs, Trunk, & Arms Mixed Four |
| Gold medal – first place | 2015 Boston | Legs, Trunk, & Arms Mixed Four |

Danielle "Dani" Hansen (born October 16, 1993, in Modesto, California) is an American rower. She competed at the 2016 Summer Paralympics in Rio de Janeiro. Hansen has won a gold medal and five silver medals from the World Rowing Championships and a silver medal from the 2016 Paralympic Games. She is a Royal Canadian Henley Regatta champion, a four-time Head of the Charles Regatta champion, and two-time U.S. national champion. She was a member of the Paralympic Great Eight at the 2016 Head of the Charles Regatta consisting of gold, silver, and bronze Rio Paralympic medalists from Great Britain, United States, and Canada.

== Background ==
Hansen is diagnosed with Erb's palsy in her left arm. She received her bachelor's degree in psychology at the University of Washington. In 2018 she was a coach for the women's rowing team at the University of Washington. She is currently the lead athlete at Hydrow.

== Career ==
=== College career ===
She finished first place at the 2014 Pac-12 Championship in the University of Washington's novice eight.

=== Senior career ===
==== 2014 ====
Hansen won a silver medal in the Legs, Trunk, & Arms Mixed 4+ at the 2014 World Rowing Championships in Amsterdam, Netherlands.

==== 2015 ====
Hansen won a silver medal in the Legs, Trunk, & Arms Mixed 4+ at the 2015 World Rowing Championships in Aiguebelette, France.

==== 2016 ====
Hansen won a silver medal in the Legs, Trunk, & Arms Mixed 4+ at the 2016 Paralympic Games in Rio de Janeiro, Brazil.

In New York City, at the New York Athletic ClubHansen was honored as the USRowing's Fan Choice Awards National Team Athlete of the Year in 2016.

==== 2017 ====
Hansen won a silver medal in the PR3 Mixed 4+ at the 2017 World Rowing Championships in Sarasota, Florida.

2018

Hansen won a silver medal in the PR3 Mixed 4+ at the 2018 World Rowing Championships in Plovdiv, Bulgaria.

Hansen also won a gold medal and set a World Record in the PR3 w2- with her pair partner, Jaclyn Smith, at the 2018 World Rowing Championships in Plovdiv, Bulgaria.

2019

Hansen won a silver medal in the PR3 Mixed 4+ at the 2019 World Rowing Championships in Ottensheim, Austria.

=== Senior ===
| Year | Event | LTA Mixed 2x | Women's Elite/Senior 2- | Women's 8+ | PR3 Mixed 4+ | Mixed 8+ |
|---|---|---|---|---|---|---|
| 2014 | World Championships | | | | 2nd place, silver medalist(s) | |
| 2015 | Head of the Charles Regatta | | | | 1st place, gold medalist(s) | |
| 2015 | World Championships | | | | 2nd place, silver medalist(s) | |
| 2015 | Royal Canadian Henley Regatta | | | | 1st place, gold medalist(s) | |
| 2016 | Head of the Charles Regatta | | | | 1st place, gold medalist(s) | 1st place, gold medalist(s) |
| 2016 | Paralympic Games | | | | 2nd place, silver medalist(s) | |
| 2017 | Head of the Charles Regatta | | | | 1st place, gold medalist(s) | |
| 2017 | World Championships | | | | 2nd place, silver medalist(s) | |
| 2017 | U.S. Rowing Club & Elite National Championships | 1st place, gold medalist(s) | 2nd place, silver medalist(s) | | 1st place, gold medalist(s) | |
