= Jennifer Sichel =

American Paralympic rower

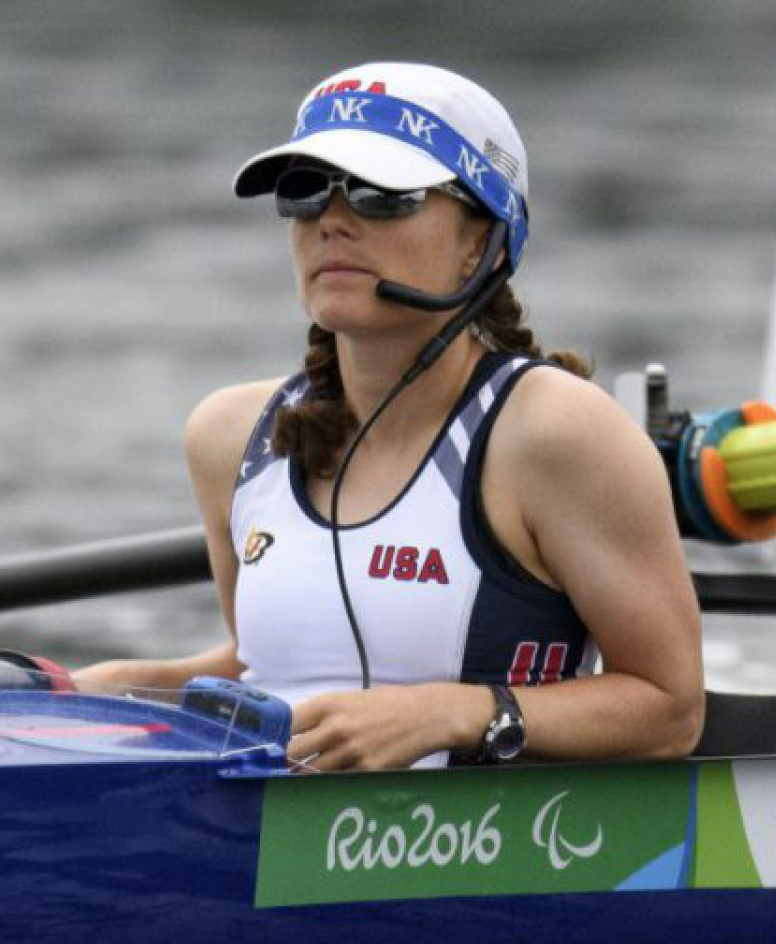
- Jennifer Sichel competing at the Rio 2016 Paralympic Games

Personal information
- National team: United States
- Born: March 9, 1988 (age 38) New York, NY
- Height: 5 ft 3 in (160 cm)
- Weight: 110 lb (50 kg)

Sport
- Sport: rowing
- College team: Bryn Mawr College
- Club: Community Rowing Inc.
Medal record
Legs, Trunk, & Arms Mixed Four
Representing the United States
Event	1st	2nd	3rd
Paralympic Games	0	1	0
World Championships	0	3	0
Head of the Charles Regatta	5	3	0
Royal Canadian Henley Regatta	1	0	0
Total	6	4	0
Paralympic Games
Silver medal – second place	2016 Rio de Janeiro	Legs, Trunk, & Arms Mixed Four
World Championships
Silver medal – second place	2017 Sarasota	PR3 Mixed Four
Silver medal – second place	2015 Aiguebelette	Legs, Trunk, & Arms Mixed Four
Silver medal – second place	2014 Amsterdam	Legs, Trunk, & Arms Mixed Four
Royal Canadian Henley Regatta
Gold medal – first place	2015 St. Catharines	Legs, Trunk, & Arms Mixed Four
U.S. Rowing Club & Elite National Championships
Gold medal – first place	2017 Harsha Lake	Legs, Trunk, & Arms Mixed Four
Gold medal – first place	2010 Oak Ridge	Women's Senior Four
Gold medal – first place	2010 Oak Ridge	Men's Intermediate Lightweight Four
Head of the Charles Regatta
Gold medal – first place	2017 Boston	Legs, Trunk, & Arms Mixed Four
Gold medal – first place	2016 Boston	Legs, Trunk, & Arms Mixed Four
Gold medal – first place	2016 Boston	Mixed Eight
Gold medal – first place	2015 Boston	Legs, Trunk, & Arms Mixed Four
Gold medal – first place	2014 Boston	Legs, Trunk, & Arms Mixed Four

Jennifer Sichel (born March 9, 1988, in Clifton, New Jersey) is an American coxswain. She competed at the 2016 Summer Paralympics in Rio de Janeiro. She won three silver medals from the World Rowing Championships and a silver medal from the 2016 Paralympic Games. She is a Royal Canadian Henley Regatta champion, a five-time Head of the Charles Regatta champion, and three-time U.S. national champion. She was a member of the Paralympic Great Eight at the 2016 Head of the Charles Regatta consisting of gold, silver, and bronze Rio Paralympic medalists from Great Britain, United States, and Canada.

== Career ==
=== Senior career ===
==== 2013–2014 season ====
Sichel won a silver medal in the Legs, Trunk, & Arms Mixed 4+ at the 2014 World Rowing Championships in Amsterdam, Netherlands.

==== 2014–2015 season ====
Sichel won a silver medal in the Legs, Trunk, & Arms Mixed 4+ at the 2015 World Rowing Championships in Aiguebelette, France.

==== 2015–2016 season ====
Sichel won a silver medal in the Legs, Trunk, & Arms Mixed 4+ at the 2016 Paralympic Games in Rio de Janeiro, Brazil.

==== 2016–2017 season ====
Sichel won a silver medal in the PR3 Mixed 4+ at the 2017 World Rowing Championships in Sarasota, Florida.

== Competitive History ==
=== Senior ===
Year	Event	Women's 4+	Men's 4+	Women's 8+	Men's 8+	PR3 Mixed 4+	Mixed 8+
2010	U.S. Rowing Club & Elite National Championships	1st place, gold medalist(s)					
2014	Head of the Charles Regatta					1st place, gold medalist(s)	
2014	World Championships					2nd place, silver medalist(s)	
2015	Head of the Charles Regatta					1st place, gold medalist(s)	
2015	World Championships					2nd place, silver medalist(s)	
2015	Royal Canadian Henley Regatta					1st place, gold medalist(s)	
2016	Head of the Charles Regatta					1st place, gold medalist(s)	1st place, gold medalist(s)
2016	Paralympic Games					2nd place, silver medalist(s)	
2017	Head of the Charles Regatta					1st place, gold medalist(s)	
2017	World Championships					2nd place, silver medalist(s)	
2017	U.S. Rowing Club & Elite National Championships					1st place, gold medalist(s)	
