= Renae Domaschenz =

Australian rower

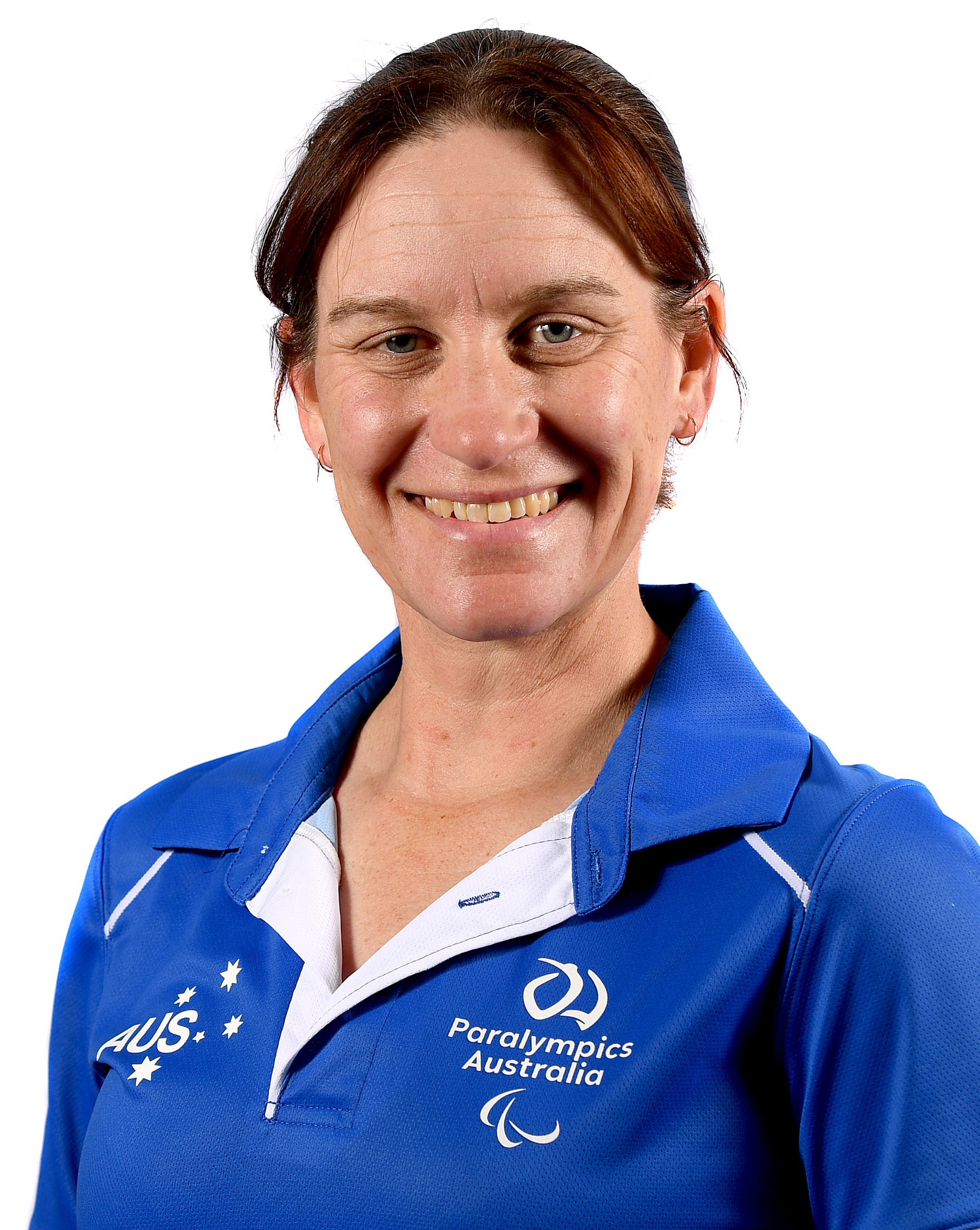
- Domaschenz in 2019

Personal information
- Nationality: Australian
- Born: 7 February 1979 (age 47)
- Home town: Adelaide

Sport
- Country: Australia
- Sport: Para-rowing
- Club: ANU Boat Club

Renae Domaschenz (born 7 February 1979) is an Australian rowing coxswain and coach. She was the coxswain in the PR3 Mix 4+ at the 2020 Tokyo Paralympics.

== Personal ==
Domaschenz was born on 7 February 1979. She grew up in Adelaide and studied at the University of Adelaide. She then completed a PhD at Cambridge University on molecular oncology. She was a Research Fellow for the Department of Genomes Sciences at the Australian National University. In 2021, she took up the position of Sports Director for Canberra Girls Grammar School.

== Rowing ==
Domaschenz became a coxswain in 2002 whilst studying at Cambridge University and coxed for Cambridge University Boat Club in the famous Oxford v Cambridge Boat Race. She then joined the high performance squad at Molesey Boat Club in London.

She made her international para rowing debut at the 2018 World Rowing Championships as the coxswain of the PR3 Mixed Coxed Four that came fifth. She was coxswain of the PR3 Mixed Coxed Four that came fourth at the 2019 World Rowing Championships.

At the 2020 Summer Paralympics, Domaschenz was the cox of the PR3 Mix 4+ consisting of Tom Birtwhistle, James Talbot, Alexandra Viney and Nikki Ayers. The team qualified for the final after winning their Repechage with time of 7:06.98 but came fourth in the final and failed to win a medal.

Domaschenz has been Assistant Coach/Pathways Development Coordinator for the ACT Academy of Sport/ Rowing ACT High Performance Program. She is the current coach of Paralympic medallist Kathryn Ross.

In 2021, Domaschenz is a member of the ANU Boat Club.
