= Guylaine Marchand =

French rower (born 1969)

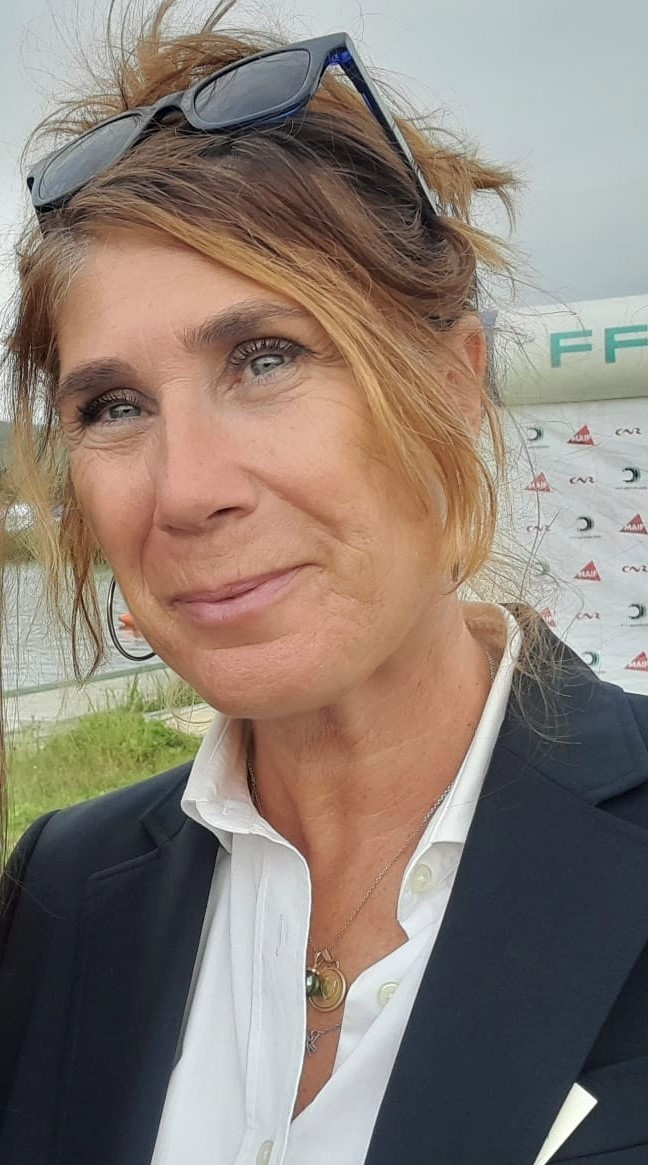
- Guylaine Marchand, 2021

Personal information
- Born: 1 June 1969 (age 57) La Flèche, France
- Height: 1.78 m (5 ft 10 in)
- Weight: 63 kg (139 lb)

Sport
- Country: France
- Sport: Adaptive rowing
- Disability: Bone cancer survivor
Medal record
Adaptive rowing
Representing France
World Championships
Gold medal – first place	2016 Rotterfam	Mixed double sculls
Silver medal – second place	2017 Sarasota	Mixed double sculls
Bronze medal – third place	2014 Amsterdam	Mixed double sculls
Bronze medal – third place	2018 Plovdiv	Mixed coxed four
European Championships
Gold medal – first place	2023 Bled	PR3 mixed double sculls
Bronze medal – third place	2020 Poznan	Mixed coxed four

Guylaine Marchand (born 1 June 1969) is a French adaptive rower who competes in international elite competitions. She is a World champion in mixed double sculls with Fabien Saint-Lannes, a World and European bronze medalist in the mixed coxed four. She competed at the 2016 Summer Paralympics in mixed coxed four but did not medal.
