= John Tanguay =

American rower

Personal information
- Nationality: American
- Born: April 3, 1998 (age 28)
- Height: 6 ft 3 in (191 cm)
- Weight: 195 lb (88 kg)

Sport
- Country: United States
- Sport: Rowing
- Event: PR3 coxed four
Medal record
Paralympic Games
Silver medal – second place	2020 Tokyo	PR3 Mix4+
World Championships
Silver medal – second place	2019 Ottensheim	PR3 Mix4+

John Tanguay (born April 3, 1998) is an American rower. He represented the United States at the 2020 Summer Paralympics.

== Biography ==
He graduated from Columbia University in 2020 and won a silver medal at the 2019 World Rowing Championships.

A resident of Pennington, New Jersey, Tanguay attended Hopewell Valley Central High School.
