= Maksym Zhuk =

Ukrainian footballer (born 2003)

Personal information
- Full name: Maksym Evgenovich Zhuk
- Date of birth: 18 August 2003 (age 23)
- Place of birth: Mariupol, Ukraine
- Height: 1.91 m (6 ft 3 in)
- Position: Goalkeeper

Team information
- Current team: KTP
- Number: 33

Youth career
- –2022: Mariupol

Senior career*
Years	Team	Apps	(Gls)
2021–2022	Mariupol	0	(0)
2023–	KTP	61	(0)
2023	→ PEPO (loan)	1	(0)
2023	→ KäPa (loan)	10	(0)
2025	→ SalPa (loan)	10	(0)
- * Club domestic league appearances and goals as of 1 November 2026

Maksym Evgenovich Zhuk (Ukrainian: Максим Євгенович Жук; born 18 August 2003) is a Ukrainian professional football player who plays as a goalkeeper for KTP.

== Career ==
Zhuk was born and raised in Mariupol, Ukraine, and played in a youth sector of local club FC Mariupol. In late February 2022, he attended the club's first team's training camp in Turkey. On 24 February, the team was supposed to return to Ukraine, but before the boarding of their flight, the Russian invasion of Ukraine escalated and Russia started bombing the country and also Mariupol. His family fled from Ukraine and relocated to Tallinn, Estonia. After spending one month in Turkey, Zhuk and the FC Mariupol players started to look for new clubs. Via Croatia and Poland, Zhuk ended up to Estonian club Nõmme Kalju. From Estonia, Zhuk traveled to Kotka, Finland, and joined local club KTP, with a help from Nõmme Kalju's sporting director Argo Arbeiter, former head coach of KTP.

He joined KTP team in summer 2022, but signed his first professional contract for the 2023 Veikkausliiga season. He played one game with associate club PEPO Lappeenranta in third-tier Kakkonen, before on 31 July he was loaned out to Ykkönen club Käpylän Pallo for the rest of the 2023 season in Finnish second-tier. He returned to KTP for the 2024 season, and in October they secured the new second-tier Ykkösliiga title and were promoted back to Veikkausliiga.

== Career statistics ==
As of 1 November 2026

Appearances and goals by club, season and competition
Club	Season	League			National cup (Note: Includes Suomen Cup)		League cup (Note: Includes Ykkösliigacup and Finnish League Cup)		Total	
Club	Season	Division	Apps	Goals	Apps	Goals	Apps	Goals	Apps	Goals
Mariupol	2021–22	Ukrainian Premier League	0	0	0	0	–		0	0
KTP	2023	Veikkausliiga	0	0	0	0	0	0	0	0
KTP	2024	Ykkösliiga	27	0	0	0	2	0	29	0
KTP	2025	Veikkausliiga	8	0	2	0	3	0	13	0
KTP	2026	Ykkösliiga	26	0	0	0	5	0	31	0
KTP	Total		61	0	2	0	10	0	73	0
PEPO Lappeenranta (loan)	2023	Kakkonen	1	0	–		–		1	0
Käpylän Pallo (loan)	2023	Ykkönen	10	0	–		–		10	0
SalPa (loan)	2025	Ykkösliiga	10	0	–		–		10	0
Career total			81	0	2	0	10	0	93	0

== Honours ==
KTP

- Ykkösliiga: 2024
