= Grace Clough =

British Paralympic rower

Grace Clough MBE
Personal information
- National team: Great Britain
- Born: 21 June 1991 (age 35) Sheffield, England
- Height: 173 cm (5 ft 8 in)

Sport
- Country: Great Britain
- Sport: Adaptive rowing
- Position: Bow
- Disability: Erb's palsy
- Disability class: PR3
Medal record
Adaptive rowing
Representing Great Britain
Paralympic Games
Gold medal – first place	2016 Rio de Janeiro	Mixed coxed four
World Championships
Gold medal – first place	2014 Amsterdam	Mixed coxed four
Gold medal – first place	2015 Aiguebelette-le-Lac	Mixed coxed four
Gold medal – first place	2017 Sarasota	Mixed coxed four
Gold medal – first place	2018 Plovdiv	Mixed coxed four

Grace Elizabeth Sorrel Clough (born 21 June 1991) is a former British Paralympic rower who competed in the mixed coxed four event. She won multiple gold medals at the World Rowing Championships and World Rowing Cup alongside a gold at the 2016 Summer Paralympics. Clough was inducted into the Sheffield Legends Walk of Fame in 2016 and named a Member of the Order of the British Empire in 2017.

== Early life and education ==
Clough was born on 21 June 1991 in Sheffield, England. She was born with Erb's palsy and had multiple operations to repair nerve damage in her shoulders shortly after birth. While at school, Clough began playing sports as a basketball player and captain in Yorkshire. She also played on a football team at the University of Leeds while completing a degree in sociology. She continued her rowing career while studying at Kellogg College, Oxford.

== Career ==
In 2013, Clough began rowing as a member of the Nottingham Rowing Club after being classified as a PR3 rower and completing training in Banyoles, Spain. As a competitor for Great Britain, Clough won a gold medal in the mixed coxed four at the 2014 World Rowing Championships and 2015 World Rowing Championships. Similarly, Clough won gold in the mixed coxed four events at the 2014 World Rowing Cup in Aiguebelette-le-Lac, France and the 2015 World Rowing Cup in Varese, Italy.

In the following years, Clough won an additional gold medal in mixed coxed four at the 2016 Summer Paralympics and the 2017 World Rowing Championships. In 2018, Clough won gold at the 2018 World Rowing Championships in the mixed coxed four event. After the event, Clough took a year off to heal from a pelvic injury. In 2020, Clough planned to become a physical education teacher following her post-secondary studies. With her transition to teaching, Clough ended her rowing career.

== Awards and honours ==
In 2016, Clough was inducted into the Sheffield Legends Walk of Fame. In 2017, she was named a Member of the Order of the British Empire at the 2017 New Year Honours.
