= Allie Reilly =

American rower

Alexandra Reilly
Personal information
- Nickname: Allie
- Nationality: American
- Born: August 30, 1997 (age 28)
- Home town: North Kingstown, Rhode Island, U.S.

Sport
- Sport: Rowing
- Event: PR3 coxed four
Medal record
Women's adaptive rowing
Representing the United States
Paralympic Games
Silver medal – second place	2020 Tokyo	PR3 Mix4+
World Rowing Championships
Silver medal – second place	2018 Plovdiv	PR3 Mix4+
Silver medal – second place	2019 Ottensheim	PR3 Mix4+

Alexandra Reilly (born August 30, 1997) is an American rower. She represented the United States at the 2020 Summer Paralympics.

== Career ==
Reilly represented the United States in the mixed coxed four event at the 2020 Summer Paralympics and won a silver medal.
