= Karen Petrik =

American rower

Personal information
- Nationality: American
- Born: November 18, 1997 (age 28)

Sport
- Sport: Rowing
- Event: PR3 coxed four
Medal record
Women's adaptive rowing
Representing the United States
Paralympic Games
Silver medal – second place	2020 Tokyo	PR3 Mix4+
World Rowing Championships
Silver medal – second place	2019 Ottensheim	PR3 Mix4+

Karen Petrik (born November 18, 1997) is an American rower. She represented the United States at the 2020 Summer Paralympics.

== Career ==
Petrik represented the United States in the mixed coxed four event at the 2020 Summer Paralympics and won a silver medal.
