= Charley Nordin =

American rower (born 1997)

Personal information
- Nationality: American
- Born: August 16, 1997 (age 28)
- Home town: Alameda, California, U.S.
- Height: 6 ft 8 in (203 cm)

Sport
- Sport: Rowing
- Event: PR3 coxed four
Medal record
Men's adaptive rowing
Representing the United States
Paralympic Games
Silver medal – second place	2020 Tokyo	PR3 Mix4+
World Rowing Championships
Silver medal – second place	2018 Plovdiv	PR3 Mix4+
Silver medal – second place	2019 Ottensheim	PR3 Mix4+
World Cup 2
Gold medal – first place	2019 Poznań	PR3 Mix4+

Charley Nordin (born August 16, 1997) is an American rower. He represented the United States at the 2020 Summer Paralympics. According to an interview with Charley, he suffered an accident during his junior year of high school that ended his athletic career in Track & Field due to losing his right calf and gluteal muscles.

“We were out at a lake and I was on a rope swing,” Nordin said. “It was a rope swing I’d gone on 100 times before. It was something I’d always done. Before I made it out over the cliff, like over the water, the rope snapped and I fell, and instead of falling into the water, I fell onto the shore. I had burst fractures in my L3, L4, and L5 vertebrae. As they burst out it partially severed my spinal cord so I have pretty severe nerve damage to my right leg.”

He started his rowing career as a novice walk on at Gonzaga University in Spokane, Washington.

== Career ==
Nordin represented the United States in the mixed coxed four event at the 2020 Summer Paralympics and won a silver medal.
