= Josh O'Brien (rower) =

British Paralympic rower

Personal information
- Full name: Joshua O'Brien
- Born: 9 April 2002 (age 24)

Sport
- Sport: Para-rowing
- Disability class: PR3
Medal record
Men's para-rowing
Representing Great Britain
Paralympic Games
Gold medal – first place	2024 Paris	PR3 mixed coxed four
World Championships
Gold medal – first place	2025 Shanghai	PR3 mixed coxed four
Silver medal – second place	2026 Amsterdam	PR3 mixed coxed four
European Championships
Gold medal – first place	2024 Szeged	PR3 mixed coxed four
Gold medal – first place	2026 Varese	PR3 mixed coxed four

Joshua O'Brien (born 9 April 2002) is a British rower, who won gold in the PR3 mixed coxed four at the 2024 Summer Paralympics in Paris.
