= Oliver Stanhope =

British Paralympic rower

Oliver Stanhope MBE
Personal information
- Nickname: Stan
- Nationality: British
- Born: 30 May 1998 (age 28) Hampton, London
- Weight: 90 kg (198 lb)

Sport
- Country: United Kingdom
- Sport: Pararowing
- Event: PR3 Mixed Coxed Four
- Club: Molesey Boat Club
Medal record
Pararowing
Representing Great Britain
Paralympic Games
Gold medal – first place	2020 Tokyo	PR3 mixed coxed four
World Championships
Gold medal – first place	2017 Sarasota	PR3 mixed coxed four
Gold medal – first place	2018 Plovdiv	PR3 mixed coxed four
Gold medal – first place	2019 Ottensheim	PR3 mixed coxed four
Gold medal – first place	2022 Račice	PR3 coxless pair
Gold medal – first place	2022 Račice	PR3 mixed coxed four
European Championships
Gold medal – first place	2021 Varese	PR3 mixed coxed four
Gold medal – first place	2022 Oberschleißheim	PR3 mixed coxed four

Oliver Stanhope (born 30 May 1998) is a British Paralympic rower who competes in the coxed four in international level events. He is the son of former rower Richard Stanhope.

He won a gold medal in the mixed cox four at the 2020 Tokyo Paralympics.

Stanhope was appointed Member of the Order of the British Empire (MBE) in the 2022 New Year Honours for services to rowing.
