= Andrew Todd (rower) =

Canadian adaptive rower (born 1989)

Personal information
- Born: 13 June 1989 (age 37) Thunder Bay, Ontario, Canada
- Education: University of Ottawa

Sport
- Country: Canada
- Sport: Adaptive rowing
Medal record
Para rowing
Representing Canada
Paralympic Games
Bronze medal – third place	2016 Rio de Janeiro	Mixed coxed four
World Championships
Gold medal – first place	2018 Plovdiv	PR3 M2-
Gold medal – first place	2019 Linz Ottensheim	PR3 M2-
Bronze medal – third place	2015 Aiguebelette	LTAMix4+

Andrew Todd (born June 13, 1989) is a Canadian adaptive rower who competes in international level events. He is a double World champion and a Paralympic bronze medalist at the 2016 Summer Paralympics. He competes in the mixed coxed four and coxless pair.

In May 2013, Todd was given an invitation to compete in the Canadian men's lightweight fours national team. He was struck by a bus three days after his invitation in London, Ontario, the school bus failed to stop at a stop sign and hit Todd and some of his teammates who were cycling on the outskirts of the city. Todd's lower limbs were worst affected as the back wheels of the bus were crushing his pelvis, he also had a fractured kneecap in the accident. He suffered life changing injuries mainly to his right leg; he had more than ten surgeries but he could not regain strength in his leg.
