= Margot Boulet =

French rower (born 1990)

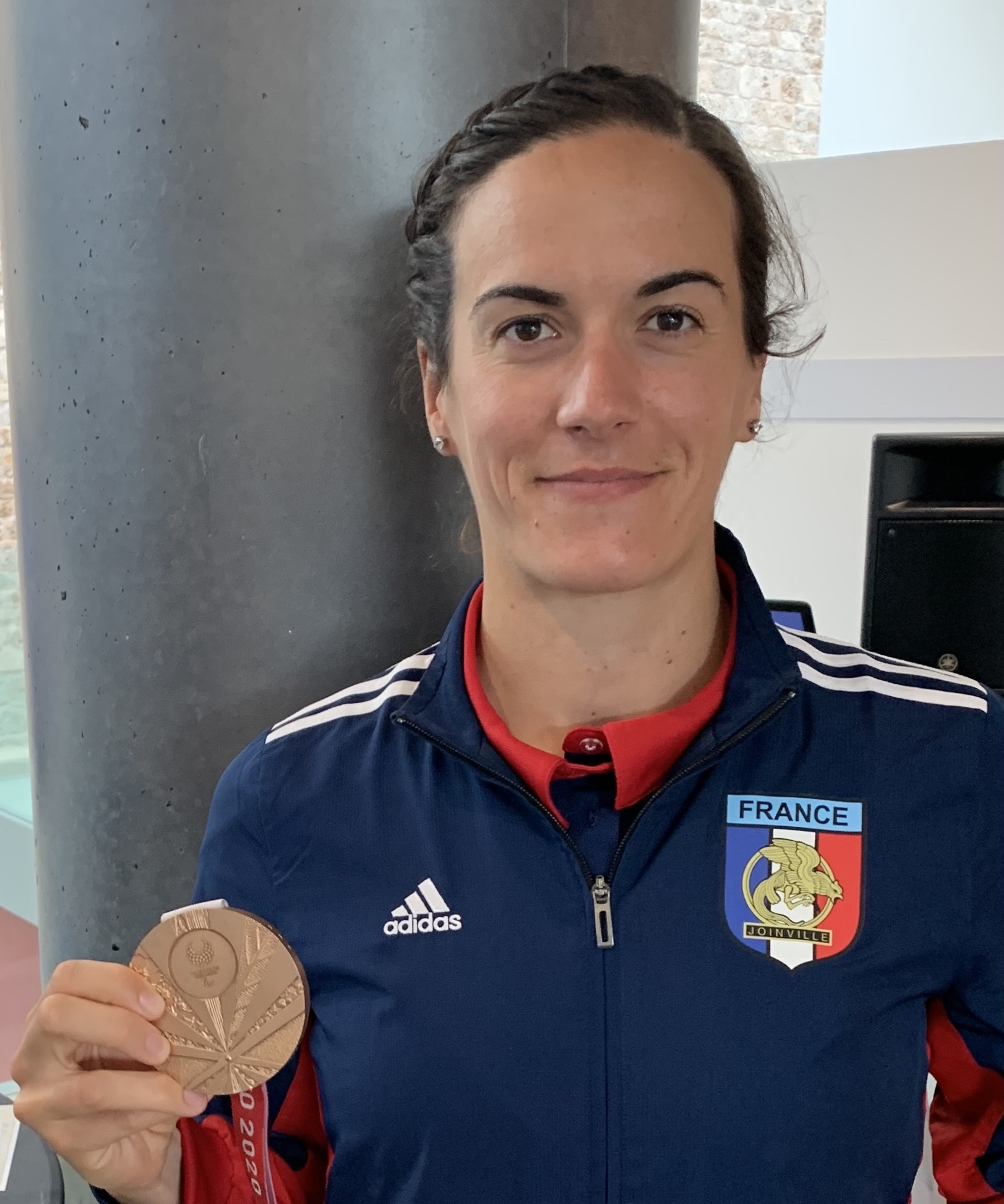
- Boulet in 2021

Personal information
- Born: 13 May 1990 (age 36) Provins, France

Sport
- Country: France
- Sport: Para-rowing
- Disability: Paraplegia
- Disability class: PR3
- Club: Cercle D'aviron Nogentais
Medal record
Para-rowing
Representing France
Paralympic Games
Bronze medal – third place	2024 Paris	PR3 Mix4+
Bronze medal – third place	2024 Paris	PR3 Mix4+
World Championships
Bronze medal – third place	2022 Račice	PR3 Mix4+
European Championships
Silver medal – second place	2021 Varese	PR3 Mix4+
Silver medal – second place	2022 Oberschleißheim	PR3 Mix4+
Silver medal – second place	2024 Szeged	PR3 Mix4+
Bronze medal – third place	2020 Poznań	PR3 Mix4+
Bronze medal – third place	2023 Bled	PR3 Mix4+

Margot Boulet (French: [maʁɡo bulɛ]; born 13 May 1990) is a French adaptive rower who competes in international rowing competitions. She is a Paralympic bronze medalist and a two-time European medalist.

== Accident ==
Boulet was paralysed following a serious parachuting accident while training in Pau in March 2017. She had fractures in her vertebrae, a broken ankle and multiple bruising and was temporarily paralysed.
