= Rémy Taranto =

French adaptive rower

Personal information
- Born: 3 February 1982 (age 44) Marseille, France
- Height: 1.85 m (6 ft 1 in)
- Weight: 84 kg (185 lb)

Sport
- Country: France
- Sport: Pararowing
- Disability class: PR3
Medal record
Para-rowing
Representing France
Paralympic Games
Bronze medal – third place	2020 Tokyo	PR3 mixed coxed four
Bronze medal – third place	2024 Paris	PR3 mixed coxed four
World Championships
Bronze medal – third place	2018 Plovdiv	PR3 mixed coxed four
Bronze medal – third place	2022 Račice	PR3 mixed coxed four
European Championships
Silver medal – second place	2021 Varese	PR3 mixed coxed four
Silver medal – second place	2024 Szeged	PR3 mixed coxed four
Bronze medal – third place	2020 Poznań	PR3 mixed coxed four

Rémy Taranto (born 3 February 1982) is a French adaptive rower who competes in international elite competitions in the mixed coxed four. He is a World bronze medalist and a European silver medalist, he has competed at the 2012 and 2016 Summer Paralympics but did not medal. He has qualified for the 2020 Summer Paralympics, winning a bronze medal in the rowing competition.
