= Giedrė Rakauskaitė =

British Paralympic rower (born 1991)

Giedre Rakauskaite MBE
Personal information
- Born: Giedrė Rakauskaitė; 13 June 1991 (age 35) Kaunas, Lithuania
- Home town: Worcester, Worcestershire, England

Sport
- Country: United Kingdom
- Sport: Para-rowing
- Disability class: PR3
Medal record
Para-rowing
Representing Great Britain
Paralympic Games
Gold medal – first place	2020 Tokyo	PR3 mixed coxed four
Gold medal – first place	2024 Paris	PR3 mixed coxed four
World Championships
Gold medal – first place	2017 Sarasota	PR3 mixed coxed four
Gold medal – first place	2019 Ottensheim	PR3 mixed coxed four
Gold medal – first place	2022 Račice	PR3 coxless pair
Gold medal – first place	2022 Račice	PR3 mixed coxed four
Gold medal – first place	2023 Belgrade	PR3 mixed coxed four
Gold medal – first place	2025 Shanghai	PR3 mixed coxed four
European Championships
Gold medal – first place	2021 Varese	PR3 mixed coxed four
Gold medal – first place	2022 Oberschleißheim	PR3 mixed coxed four
Gold medal – first place	2023 Bled	PR3 mixed coxed four
Gold medal – first place	2024 Szeged	PR3 mixed coxed four

Giedrė Rakauskaitė (born 13 June 1991 in Kaunas) is a British Paralympic rower who is a double Olympic champion and quintuple World champion in the mixed coxed four.

She won a gold medal in the mixed cox four at the 2020 Tokyo Paralympics.

Rakauskaitė was appointed Member of the Order of the British Empire (MBE) in the 2022 New Year Honours for services to rowing.
