= Ellen Buttrick =

British Paralympic rower (born 1995)

Ellen Buttrick MBE
Personal information
- Born: 3 August 1995 (age 30) Leeds, England
- Height: 177 cm (5 ft 10 in)

Sport
- Country: United Kingdom
- Sport: Pararowing
- Disability: Macular degeneration
- Club: Leeds Rowing Club
Medal record
Pararowing
Representing Great Britain
Paralympic Games
Gold medal – first place	2020 Tokyo	PR3 Mixed 4+
World Championships
Gold medal – first place	2018 Plovdiv	PR3 Mixed 4+
Gold medal – first place	2019 Ottensheim	PR3 Mixed 4+

Ellen Frances Buttrick (born 3 August 1995) is a British Paralympic rower who competes in the mixed coxed four.

Buttrick was appointed Member of the Order of the British Empire (MBE) in the 2022 New Year Honours for services to rowing.

Buttrick studied at Northumbria University for a BSc in Geography. She currently studies at the London School of Economics and Political Science (LSE) where she is undertaking a MSc in Gender, Policy and Inequalities.
