= Antoine Jesel =

French adaptive rower

Personal information
- Born: 16 October 1981 (age 44) Maradi, Niger

Sport
- Country: France
- Sport: Adaptive rowing
Medal record
Adaptive rowing
Representing France
Paralympic Games
Bronze medal – third place	2020 Tokyo	PR3 Mix4+
World Championships
Silver medal – second place	2017 Sarasota	PR3 Mix2x
Bronze medal – third place	2014 Amsterdam	PR3 Mix2x
Bronze medal – third place	2018 Plovdiv	PR3 Mix4+
European Championships
Silver medal – second place	2021 Varese	PR3 Mix4+
Bronze medal – third place	2020 Poznan	PR3 Mix4+

Antoine Jesel (born 16 October 1981) is a French adaptive rower of Nigerien descent. He has competed at the Paralympic Games three times and has won one Paralympic bronze medal, he has also won three medals at the World Rowing Championships and two medals at the European Rowing Championships in both mixed coxed four and double sculls.
