= James Fox (rower) =

British Paralympic rower

James Fox MBE
Personal information
- Born: 2 May 1992 (age 34) Peterborough, England

Sport
- Country: United Kingdom
- Sport: Paralympic rowing
- Disability: Congenital ankle condition
- Club: University of London Boat Club
- Coached by: Brian Young
Medal record
Paralympic rowing
Representing Great Britain
Paralympic Games
Gold medal – first place	2016 Rio de Janeiro	Mixed coxed four
Gold medal – first place	2020 Tokyo	Mixed coxed four
World Championships
Gold medal – first place	2013 Chungju	LTA Mix 4+
Gold medal – first place	2014 Amsterdam	LTA Mix 4+
Gold medal – first place	2015 Aiguebelette-le-Lac	LTA Mix 4+
Gold medal – first place	2017 Sarasota	PR3 Mix 4+
Gold medal – first place	2019 Ottensheim	PR3 Mix 4+

James Fox MBE (born 2 May 1992) is a British Paralympic rower who is a five time World champion and a Paralympic champion in the mixed coxed four Paralympic events. He started rowing when he was eleven.

He started his career at the Peterborough City Rowing Club. Fox broke his back in a car accident shortly after starting university.

Fox attended the University of London where he crewed for the University of London Boat Club (ULBC).
