= Australian Paralympic Rowing Team =

Rowing was added to the Summer Paralympic Games competition schedule at the 2008 Beijing Games. Australia has been represented since 2008 Games.

== Medal table ==
| Games | Gold | Silver | Bronze | Total |
|---|---|---|---|---|
| 2008 Beijing | 0 | 1 | 0 | 1 |
| 2012 London | 0 | 1 | 0 | 1 |
| 2016 Rio | 0 | 1 | 0 | 1 |
| 2020 Tokyo | 0 | 1 | 0 | 1 |
| 2024 Paris | 1 | 0 | 0 | 1 |
| Totals (5 entries) | 1 | 4 | 0 | 5 |

== Medalists ==
=== 2008 ===
| Medal | Name | Event |
|---|---|---|
| Silver | Kathryn Ross, John Maclean, | Mixed Double Scull |

=== 2012 ===
| Medal | Name | Event |
|---|---|---|
| Silver | Erik Horrie | Men's Single Scull |

=== 2016 ===
| Medal | Name | Event |
|---|---|---|
| Silver | Erik Horrie | Men's Single Scull |

=== 2020 ===
| Medal | Name | Event |
|---|---|---|
| Silver | Erik Horrie | Men's Single Scull |

=== 2024 ===
| Medal | Name | Event |
|---|---|---|
| Gold | Nikki Ayers; Jed Altschwager | Mixed Double Sculls PR3 |

== Summer Paralympic Games ==
=== 2008 Beijing ===
Representing Australia in rowing:
Single scull - Dominic Monypenny
Double scull - John Maclean, Kathryn Ross
Coaches - Coaches - Peter Albisser (Head Coach), Rik Bryan
Officials - Section Manager - Adam Horner
Rowing made its debut at the Beijing Games and Australia competed in two of the four events and won a silver medal in the double scull.
Australia won a silver medal.

Detailed Australian Results

=== 2012 London ===
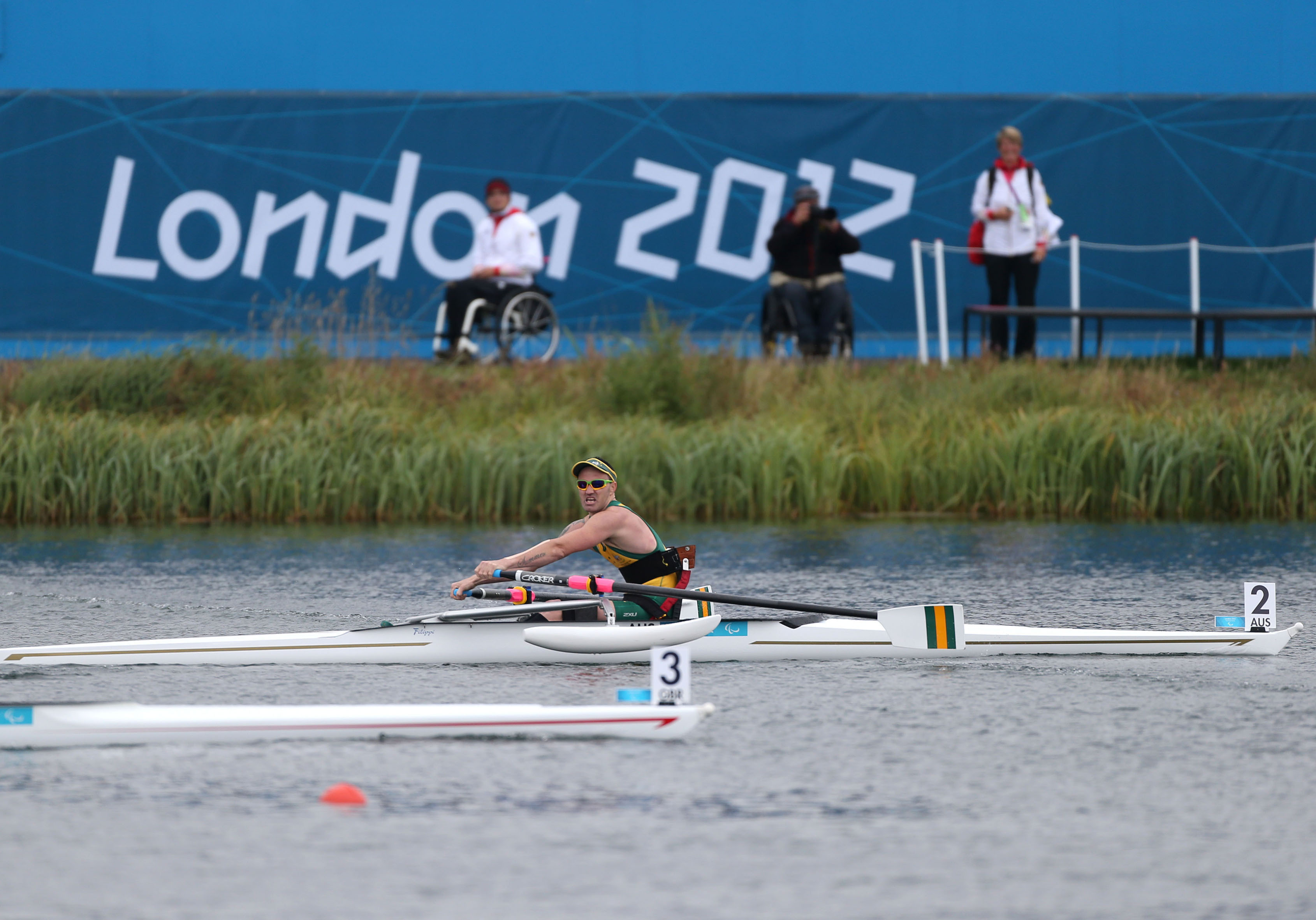
Horrie competing at the 2012 London Paralympics

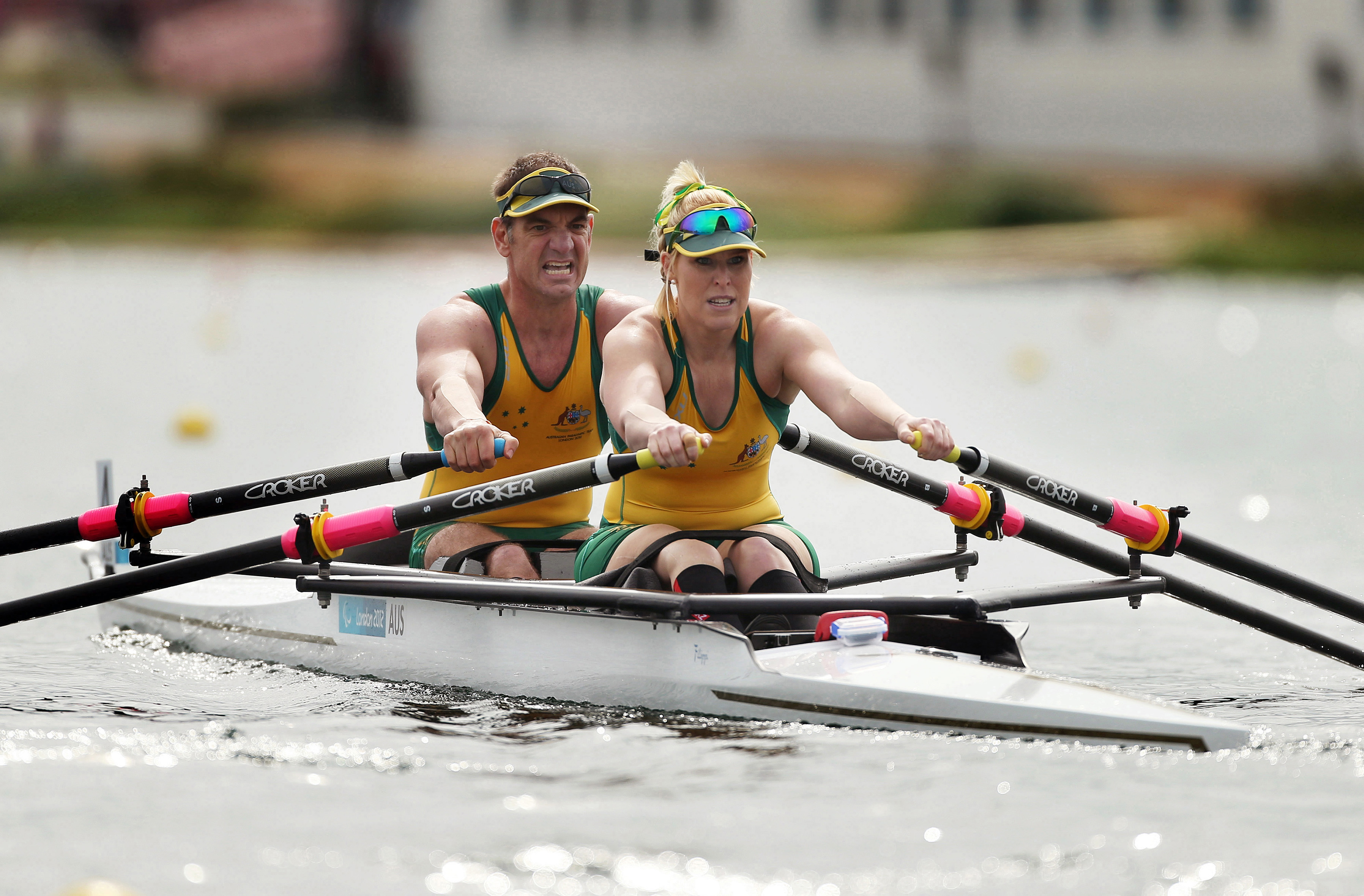
Ross and Gavin Bellis competing at the 2012 London Paralympics

Representing Australia in rowing:
Single scull – Erik Horrie
Pair – Gavin Bellis, Kathryn Ross
Coach - Chad King
Officials - Section Manager - Dean Oakman, Boat Technician – Urs Graf, Physiotherapist – Erin Smyth

Detailed Australian Results

=== 2016 Rio ===
Representing Australia in rowing:

'Men's single scull' - Erik Horrie
Mixed double scull - Kathryn Ross (rower), Gavin Bellis,
Mixed cox four - Josephine Burnand (d) (cox), Davinia Lefroy (d), Kathleen Murdoch (d), Brock Ingram (d), Jeremy McGrath (rower) (d)
Coaches - Gordon Marcks, Tara Huntly, Jason Baker
Officials - Team Manager - Dean Oakman, Boatman - Chris O'Brien

Australia qualified a boat in the Legs, Trunk and Arms Mixed Coxed Four for the first time. Erik Horrie repeated his medal success in London with a silver medal.

Detailed Australian Results

=== 2020 Tokyo ===
Representing Australia in rowing:

Men's single scull - Erik Horrie
Mixed double scull - Kathryn Ross (rower), Simon Albury,
Mixed cox four - Tom Birtwhistle, James Talbot, Nikki Ayers, Alexandra Viney, Renae Domaschenz (cox)
Coaches - Elizabeth Chapman, Lincoln Handley, Jason Baker
Officials- Team Leader - Gordon Marcks, Physiotherapist - Sarah Hammond

Erik Horrie repeated his medal success in London and Rio with a silver medal.
Detailed Australian Results

=== 2024 Paris ===
Representing Australia in rowing:

Men's single scull - Erik Horrie
Mixed double scull - Nikki Ayers, Jed Altschwager
Mixed cox four - Tom Birtwhistle, Hannah Cowap (cox), Tobiah Goffsassen, Susannah Lutze
Coaches - Chad King (Head), James Loveday
Officials- Team Leader - Christine McLaren, Physiotherapist - Sarah Hammond. Support staff - Paul Thompson

Viney and Altschwager won Australia's first rowing Paralympic gold medal.
Detailed Australian Results

== See also ==
- Rowing at the Summer Paralympics
- Australia at the Paralympics
