= Rowing at the 2016 Summer Paralympics – Mixed coxed four =

Mixed coxed four at the XV Paralympic Games
- Venue: Rodrigo de Freitas Lagoon
- Date: 9 September – 11 September 2016
- Competitors: 60 from 12 nations

Medalists
1st place, gold medalist(s)		Grace Clough; Daniel Brown; Pam Relph; James Fox; Oliver James	Great Britain
2nd place, silver medalist(s)		Jaclyn Smith; Danielle Hansen; Zachary Burns; Dorian Weber; Jennifer Sichel	United States
3rd place, bronze medalist(s)		Victoria Nolan; Meghan Montgomery; Andrew Todd; Curtis Halladay; Kristen Kit	Canada

The mixed coxed four competition at the 2016 Summer Paralympics in Rio de Janeiro took place at Rodrigo de Freitas Lagoon.

== Results ==
=== Heats ===
The winner of each heat qualified to the finals, remainder to the repechage.

==== Heat 1 ====
Rank	Rowers	Country	Time	Notes
1	Grace Clough; Daniel Brown; Pam Relph; James Fox; Oliver James	Great Britain	3:25.08	Q
2	Wang Qian; Zhao Hui; Chen Xinxin; Wu Yunlong; Yu Li	China	3:29.66	R
3	Shannon Murray; Lucy Perold; Dylan Trollope; Dieter Rosslee; Willie Morgan	South Africa	3:30.04	R
4	Kathleen Murdoch; Brock Ingram; Jeremy McGrath; Davinia Lefroy; Josephine Burnand	Australia	3:32.88	R
5	Valentina Grassi; Tommaso Schettino; Luca Lunghi; Florinda Trombetta; Giuseppe Di Capua	Italy	3:37.37	R
6	Margret Bangajena; Michelle Garnett; Takudzwa Gwariro; Previous Wiri; Jessica Davis	Zimbabwe	4:08.63	R

==== Heat 2 ====
Rank	Rowers	Country	Time	Notes
1	Jaclyn Smith; Danielle Hansen; Zachary Burns; Dorian Weber; Jennifer Sichel	United States	3:21.65	Q
2	Victoria Nolan; Meghan Montgomery; Andrew Todd; Curtis Halladay; Kristen Kit	Canada	3:24.69	R
3	Anke Molkenthin; Tino Kolitscher; Valentin Luz; Susanne Lackner; Inga Thöne	Germany	3:31.59	R
4	Guylaine Marchand; Anne-Laure Frappart; Antoine Jesel; Rémy Taranto; Robin Le Barreau	France	3:32.04	R
5	Olexandra Yankova; Iryna Yarynka; Olexandr Bilonozhko; Maksym Zhuk; Volodymyr Kozlov	Ukraine	3:33.25	R
6	Maria Dorn; Gerheid Pahl; Thomas Ebner; Benjamin Strasser; Erika Buchinger	Austria	3:47.13	R

=== Repechages ===
First two of each repechage qualified to the medal final, remainder to Final B.

==== Repechage 1 ====
Rank	Rowers	Country	Time	Notes
1	Anke Molkenthin; Tino Kolitscher; Valentin Luz; Susanne Lackner; Inga Thöne	Germany	3:35.68	Q
2	Wang Qian; Zhao Hui; Chen Xinxin; Wu Yunlong; Yu Li	China	3:36.38	Q
3	Guylaine Marchand; Anne-Laure Frappart; Antoine Jesel; Rémy Taranto; Robin Le Barreau	France	3:36.65	Final B
4	Valentina Grassi; Tommaso Schettino; Luca Lunghi; Florinda Trombetta; Giuseppe Di Capua	Italy	3:42.45	Final B
5	Margret Bangajena; Michelle Garnett; Takudzwa Gwariro; Previous Wiri; Jessica Davis	Zimbabwe	4:13.76	Final B

==== Repechage 2 ====
Rank	Rowers	Country	Time	Notes
1	Victoria Nolan; Meghan Montgomery; Andrew Todd; Curtis Halladay; Kristen Kit	Canada	3:33.85	Q
2	Shannon Murray; Lucy Perold; Dylan Trollope; Dieter Rosslee; Willie Morgan	South Africa	3:36.49	Q
3	Kathleen Murdoch; Brock Ingram; Jeremy McGrath; Davinia Lefroy; Josephine Burnand	Australia	3:37.29	Final B
4	Olexandra Yankova; Iryna Yarynka; Olexandr Bilonozhko; Maksym Zhuk; Volodymyr Kozlov	Ukraine	3:42.59	Final B
5	Maria Dorn; Gerheid Pahl; Thomas Ebner; Benjamin Strasser; Erika Buchinger	Austria	3:58.96	Final B

=== Finals ===
==== Final A ====
Rank	Rowers	Country	Time
1st place, gold medalist(s)	Grace Clough; Daniel Brown; Pam Relph; James Fox; Oliver James	Great Britain	3:17.17
2nd place, silver medalist(s)	Jaclyn Smith; Danielle Hansen; Zachary Burns; Dorian Weber; Jennifer Sichel	United States	3:19.61
3rd place, bronze medalist(s)	Victoria Nolan; Meghan Montgomery; Andrew Todd; Curtis Halladay; Kristen Kit	Canada	3:19.90
4	Anke Molkenthin; Tino Kolitscher; Valentin Luz; Susanne Lackner; Inga Thöne	Germany	3:27.34
5	Shannon Murray; Lucy Perold; Dylan Trollope; Dieter Rosslee; Willie Morgan	South Africa	3:28.39
6	Wang Qian; Zhao Hui; Chen Xinxin; Wu Yunlong; Yu Li	China	3:31.12

==== Final B ====
Rank	Rowers	Country	Time
1	Kathleen Murdoch; Brock Ingram; Jeremy McGrath; Davinia Lefroy; Josephine Burnand	Australia	3:30.59
2	Guylaine Marchand; Anne-Laure Frappart; Antoine Jesel; Rémy Taranto; Robin Le Barreau	France	3:31.64
3	Olexandra Yankova; Iryna Yarynka; Olexandr Bilonozhko; Maksym Zhuk; Volodymyr Kozlov	Ukraine	3:34.72
4	Valentina Grassi; Tommaso Schettino; Luca Lunghi; Florinda Trombetta; Giuseppe Di Capua	Italy	3:35.76
5	Maria Dorn; Gerheid Pahl; Thomas Ebner; Benjamin Strasser; Erika Buchinger	Austria	3:45.98
6	Margret Bangajena; Michelle Garnett; Takudzwa Gwariro; Previous Wiri; Jessica Davis	Zimbabwe	4:07.56
