= Rowing at the 2008 Summer Paralympics – Mixed coxed four =

Mixed coxed four at the XIII Paralympic Games
- Venue: Shunyi Olympic Rowing-Canoeing Park
- Dates: 9–11 September 2008
- Competitors: 12

Medalists
1st place, gold medalist(s)		Paola Protopapa; Luca Agoletto; Daniele Signore; Graziana Saccocci; Alessandro Franzetti	Italy
2nd place, silver medalist(s)		Emma Preuschl; Tracy Tackett; Jesse Karmazin; Jamie Dean; Simona Chin	United States
3rd place, bronze medalist(s)		Alan Sherman; James Morgan; Alastair McKean; Naomi Riches; Vicki Hansford	Great Britain

The mixed coxed four rowing competition at the 2008 Summer Paralympics was held from 9 to 11 September at the Shunyi Olympic Rowing-Canoeing Park. The event was competed by Category LTA rowers, propelling boats by use of legs, trunk & arms.

Winners of two heats qualified for the A Final. The remainder rowed in two repechage heats, with the first two in each qualifying for the A Final, the remainder rowing in the B Final.

The event was won by the team representing Italy.

== Results ==
=== Heats ===
==== Heat 1 ====
Rowed 9 September at 17:00.

Rank	Country	Time
1	Italy	3:34.59
2	Great Britain	3:36.81
3	United States	3:37.57
4	Canada	3:43.72
5	Russia	3:51.78
6	Denmark	4:04.71

==== Heat 2 ====
Rowed 9 September at 17:20.

Rank	Country	Time
1	China	3:37.38
2	Germany	3:39.02
3	Brazil	3:40.41
4	South Africa	3:42.40
5	Netherlands	3:45.11
6	Israel	3:58.75

=== Repechage ===
==== Heat 1 ====
Rowed 10 September at 17:00.

Rank	Country	Time
1	Great Britain	3:44.90
2	Canada	3:48.76
3	Brazil	3:49.76
4	Denmark	3:56.80
5	Netherlands	3:58.63

==== Heat 2 ====
Rowed 10 September at 17:20.

Rank	Country	Time
1	United States	3:47.28
2	Germany	3:50.79
3	Russia	3:53.51
4	South Africa	3:55.03
5	Israel	4:13.39

=== Final Round ===
==== Final B ====
Rowed 11 September at 16:00.

Rank	Country	Time
1	Brazil	3:50.37
2	South Africa	3:51.91
3	Russia	3:52.20
4	Netherlands	3:56.06
5	Denmark	3:59.73
6	Israel	4:15.43

==== Final A ====
Rowed 11 September at 17:20.

Rank	Country	Time
1st place, gold medalist(s)	Italy	3:33.13
2nd place, silver medalist(s)	United States	3:37.61
3rd place, bronze medalist(s)	Great Britain	3:38.37
4	Germany	3:41.71
5	China	3:44.15
6	Canada	3:45.66

== Team Lists ==
Italy; Paola Protopapa; Luca Agoletto; Daniele Signore; Graziana Saccocci; Alessandro Franzetti	Great Britain; Alan Sherman; James Morgan; Alastair McKean; Naomi Riches; Vicki Hansford	United States; Emma Preuschl; Tracy Tackett; Jesse Karmazin; Jamie Dean; Simona Chin	Canada; Laura Comeau; Scott Rand; Anthony Theriault; Victoria Nolan; Meghan Montgomery
Russia; Elena Akimova; Valentina Pshenichnaya; Valery Bisarnov; Anatoly Krupin; Nikolay Bogomolov	Denmark; Lin Gjerding; Anders Olsen; Kenneth Kronborg; Lene van der Keur; Margit Pedersen	China; Hao Tongtu; Li Ming; Dong Hongyan; Gao Wenwen; Lin Cuizhi	Germany; Kathrin Wolff; Marcus Klemp; Michael Sauer; Susanne Lackner; Arne Maury
Brazil; Silva Nilton Alonco; Luciano Pires; Andre Dutra; Regiane Silva; Norma Moura	South Africa; Jarred Clarke; Kim Robinson; Kevin du Toit; Gordon Eddey; Masego Mokhine	Netherlands; Anne Francine van de Staak; Paul de Jong; Martin Lauriks; Nienke Vlotman; Joleen Hakker	Israel; Reuven Magnagey; Anastasia Dobrovolski; Shir Kalmanovitz; Andrew Zuhbaia; Genady Sapoznikov
