= Rowing at the 2008 Summer Paralympics =

Rowing at the XIII Paralympic Games
- Paralympic Rowing
- Venue: Shunyi Olympic Rowing-Canoeing Park
- Dates: 9–11 September

Rowing at the 2008 Summer Paralympics was held in Shunyi Olympic Rowing-Canoeing Park from 9 September to 11 September. This was the first time that rowing was competed at the Paralympic Games.

== Classification ==
Rowers were given a classification depending on the type and extent of their disability. The classification system allows rowers to compete against others with a similar level of function.

Rowing classes were:

- LTA (Legs, Trunk and Arms) - Mixed coxed fours
- TA (Trunk and Arms) - Mixed double sculls
- A (Arms only) - Men's and women's singles

== Events ==
Four rowing events were held:

- Men's Single Sculls A
- Women's Single Sculls A
- Mixed Double Sculls TA
- Mixed Four Coxed LTA

== Participating countries ==
There were 108 athletes (56 male, 52 female) from 23 nations taking part in this sport.

- Australia (3)
- Belarus (1)
- Brazil (9)
- Canada (8)
- China (9)
- Denmark (5)
- France (1)
- Germany (7)
- Great Britain (9)
- Hong Kong (1)
- Hungary (1)
- Israel (9)
- Italy (9)
- Japan (2)
- Netherlands (5)
- Poland (3)
- Portugal (1)
- Russia (5)
- South Africa (5)
- South Korea (1)
- Spain (1)
- Ukraine (4)
- United States (9)

== Medal summary ==
=== Medal table ===
This ranking sorts countries by the number of gold medals earned by their rowers (in this context a country is an entity represented by a National Paralympic Committee). The number of silver medals is taken into consideration next and then the number of bronze medals. If, after the above, countries are still tied, equal ranking is given and they are listed alphabetically.

Rank	Nation	Gold	Silver	Bronze	Total
1	Great Britain (GBR)	2	0	1	3
2	China (CHN)	1	0	0	1
2	Italy (ITA)	1	0	0	1
4	United States (USA)	0	1	1	2
5	Australia (AUS)	0	1	0	1
5	Belarus (BLR)	0	1	0	1
5	Ukraine (UKR)	0	1	0	1
8	Brazil (BRA)	0	0	1	1
8	Israel (ISR)	0	0	1	1
Totals (9 entries)		4	4	4	12

=== Medalists ===
Event	Gold	Silver	Bronze
Men's single sculls	Tom Aggar; Great Britain	Oleksandr Petrenko; Ukraine	Eli Nawi; Israel
Women's single sculls	Helene Raynsford; Great Britain	Liudmila Vauchok; Belarus	Laura Schwanger; United States
Mixed double sculls	China (CHN); Zhou Yangjing; Shan Zilong	Australia (AUS); John Maclean; Kathryn Ross	Brazil (BRA); Elton Santana; Josiane Lima
Mixed coxed four	Italy (ITA); Paola Protopapa; Luca Agoletto; Daniele Signore; Graziana Saccocci; Cox: Alessandro Franzetti	United States (USA); Emma Preuschl; Tracy Tackett; Jesse Karmazin; Jamie Dean; Cox: Simona Chin	Great Britain (GBR); Vicki Hansford; Naomi Riches; Alastair McKean; James Morgan; Cox: Alan Sherman

== See also ==
- Rowing at the 2008 Summer Olympics
