= Rowing at the 2012 Summer Paralympics – Mixed double sculls =

Mixed Double sculls at the XIV Paralympic Games
- Venue: Eton Dorney
- Date: 31 August – 2 September 2012
- Competitors: 24 from 12 nations
- Winning time: 3:57.63

Medalists
1st place, gold medalist(s)		Lou Xiaoxian; Fei Tianming	China
2nd place, silver medalist(s)		Perle Bouge; Stephane Tardieu	France
3rd place, bronze medalist(s)		Oksana Masters; Rob Jones	United States

The mixed double sculls competition at the 2012 Summer Paralympics in London took place at Dorney Lake which, for the purposes of the Games venue, is officially termed Eton Dorney.

== Results ==
=== Heats ===
The winner of each heat qualified to the finals, remainder to the repechage.

==== Heat 1 ====
Rank	Rowers	Country	Time	Notes
1	Perle Bouge; Stephane Tardieu	France	4:00.00	Q
2	Nicholas Beighton; Samantha Scowen	Great Britain	4:03.23	R
3	Gavin Bellis; Kathryn Ross	Australia	4:05.10	R
4	Josiane Lima; Isaac Ribeiro	Brazil	4:13.54	R
5	Michal Gadowski; Jolanta Pawlak	Poland	4:13.97	R
6	Olga Sokolov; Reuven Magnagey	Israel	4:18.45	R

==== Heat 2 ====
Rank	Rowers	Country	Time	Notes
1	Lou Xiaoxian; Fei Tianming	China	3:54.92	Q
2	Oksana Masters; Rob Jones	United States	4:01.00	R
3	Daniele Stefanoni; Silvia de Maria	Italy	4:02.17	R
4	Iryna Kyrychenko; Dmytro Ivanov	Ukraine	4:07.30	R
5	Alena Aliaksandrovich; Maksim Miatlou	Belarus	4:28.32	R
6	Nadezda Andreeva; Fedor Levin	Russia	4:44.08	R

=== Repechages ===
First two of each repechage qualified to the medal final, remainder to Final B.

==== Repechage 1 ====
Rank	Rowers	Country	Time	Notes
1	Nicholas Beighton; Samantha Scowen	Great Britain	4:05.91	Q
2	Daniele Stefanoni; Silvia de Maria	Italy	4:07.60	Q
3	Josiane Lima; Isaac Ribeiro	Brazil	4:12.11	Final B
4	Olga Sokolov; Reuven Magnagey	Israel	4:20.20	Final B
5	Alena Aliaksandrovich; Maksim Miatlou	Belarus	4:38.62	Final B

==== Repechage 2 ====
Rank	Rowers	Country	Time	Notes
1	Oksana Masters; Rob Jones	United States	4:05.77	Q
2	Gavin Bellis; Kathryn Ross	Australia	4:06.19	Q
3	Iryna Kyrychenko; Dmytro Ivanov	Ukraine	4:07.99	Final B
4	Michal Gadowski; Jolanta Pawlak	Poland	4:17.47	Final B
5	Nadezda Andreeva; Fedor Levin	Russia	4:47.34	Final B

=== Finals ===
==== Final A ====
Rank	Rowers	Country	Time
1st place, gold medalist(s)	Lou Xiaoxian; Fei Tianming	China	3:57.63
2nd place, silver medalist(s)	Perle Bouge; Stephane Tardieu	France	4:03.06
3rd place, bronze medalist(s)	Oksana Masters; Rob Jones	United States	4:05.56
4	Nicholas Beighton; Samantha Scowen	Great Britain	4:05.77
5	Gavin Bellis; Kathryn Ross	Australia	4:06.17
6	Daniele Stefanoni; Silvia de Maria	Italy	4:09.39

==== Final B ====
Rank	Rowers	Country	Time
7	Iryna Kyrychenko; Dmytro Ivanov	Ukraine	4:09.69
8	Josiane Lima; Isaac Ribeiro	Brazil	4:10.83
9	Olga Sokolov; Reuven Magnagey	Israel	4:14.90
10	Michal Gadowski; Jolanta Pawlak	Poland	4:17.23
11	Alena Aliaksandrovich; Maksim Miatlou	Belarus	4:36.95
12	Nadezda Andreeva; Fedor Levin	Russia	4:48.36
