= 2017 World Rowing Championships – PR3 Mixed coxed four =

PR3 Mixed coxed four at the 2017 World Rowing Championships
- Venue: Nathan Benderson Park
- Location: Sarasota, United States
- Dates: 28–30 September
- Competitors: 25 from 5 nations
- Winning time: 6:55.70

Medalists
gold medal	Grace Clough; Giedrė Rakauskaitė; Oliver Stanhope; James Fox; Anna Corderoy	Great Britain
silver medal	Jaclyn Smith; Michael Varro; Zachary Burns; Danielle Hansen; Jennifer Sichel	United States
bronze medal	Lucilla Aglioti; Tommaso Schettino; Luca Agoletto; Paola Protopapa; Gaetano Iannuzzi	Italy

The PR3 mixed coxed four competition at the 2017 World Rowing Championships in Sarasota took place in Nathan Benderson Park.

== Schedule ==
The schedule was as follows:

Date	Time	Round
Thursday 28 September 2017	09:20	Exhibition race
Saturday 30 September 2017	10:08	Final

All times are Eastern Daylight Time (UTC−4)

== Results ==
=== Exhibition race ===
With fewer than seven entries in this event, boats contested a race for lanes before the final.

Rank	Rowers	Country	Time	Notes
1	Grace Clough; Giedrė Rakauskaitė; Oliver Stanhope; James Fox; Anna Corderoy	Great Britain	7:09.36	WB
2	Jaclyn Smith; Michael Varro; Zachary Burns; Danielle Hansen; Jennifer Sichel	United States	7:31.66	
3	Olexandra Yankova; Iryna Yarknka; Olexandr Bilonozhko; Maksym Zhuk; Volodymyr Kozlov	Ukraine	7:35.31	
4	Lucilla Aglioti; Tommaso Schettino; Luca Agoletto; Paola Protopapa; Gaetano Iannuzzi	Italy	7:35.88	
5	Simona Goren; Achiya Klein; Barak Hazor; Shay-Lee Mizrachi; Leah Marissa Sass	Israel	7:38.76	

=== Final ===
The final determined the rankings.

Rank	Rowers	Country	Time	Notes
1st place, gold medalist(s)	Grace Clough; Giedrė Rakauskaitė; Oliver Stanhope; James Fox; Anna Corderoy	Great Britain	6:55.70	WB
2nd place, silver medalist(s)	Jaclyn Smith; Michael Varro; Zachary Burns; Danielle Hansen; Jennifer Sichel	United States	7:18.80	
3rd place, bronze medalist(s)	Lucilla Aglioti; Tommaso Schettino; Luca Agoletto; Paola Protopapa; Gaetano Iannuzzi	Italy	7:23.52	
4	Olexandra Yankova; Iryna Yarknka; Olexandr Bilonozhko; Maksym Zhuk; Volodymyr Kozlov	Ukraine	7:26.07	
5	Simona Goren; Achiya Klein; Barak Hazor; Shay-Lee Mizrachi; Leah Marissa Sass	Israel	DNS	
