= Rowing at the 2016 Summer Paralympics =

Rowing at the XV Paralympic Games
- Venue: Lagoa Stadium
- Dates: 9–11 September 2016
- Competitors: 96

Rowing competitions at the 2016 Summer Paralympics in Rio de Janeiro were held from 9 to 11 September 2016, at Lagoa Stadium at the Games' Copacabana hub.

== Classification ==
Rowers are given a classification depending on the type and extent of their disability. The classification system allows rowers to compete against others with a similar level of function.

The three rowing classes are:

- LTA (Legs, Trunk and Arms) - Mixed coxed fours
- TA (Trunk and Arms) - Mixed double sculls
- AS (Arms and shoulders) - Men's and women's singles

== Events ==
Four rowing events were scheduled to be held, each over a course of 1000 metres:

- Men's single sculls AS
- Women's single sculls AS
- Mixed double sculls TA
- Mixed four coxed LTA

== Qualification ==
96 athletes (48 male, 48 female) were expected to take part in this sport.

The majority of the spots were awarded based on the results at the 2015 World Rowing Championships, held at Lac d'Aiguebelette, France from August 30 to September 6, 2015. Places are awarded to National Olympic Committees, not to specific athletes. Further berths are distributed at the final Paralympic qualification regatta in Gavirate, Italy. A minimum of two places were held over for the host, Brazil, one rower of each gender. In the event, however, Brazil qualified that minimum number via the World Championships, and the host nation places were therefore added to the Bipartite commission quota distribution. Russia was excluded from the 2016 Paralympics, and Germany and USA, as the fastest non-qualifiers in AS M1x and TA X2x respectively, took Russia's place in those events.

Qualifiers for the Paralympic Games 2016 - Rowing
Qualification event	AS M1x	AS W1x	TA X2x	LTA X4+
2015 World Rowing Championships; Lucerne, Switzerland (top 8 boats per event - 64 athletes)	Australia; Great Britain; Ukraine; ~~Russia~~; United States; Netherlands; Brazil; Italy	Israel; Great Britain; Norway; Brazil; Belarus; Italy; South Africa; United States	Australia; Great Britain; France; Ukraine; Netherlands; Poland; Brazil; Israel	Great Britain; United States; Canada; Italy; South Africa; Ukraine; Germany; France
2016 Final Paralympic Regatta; Gavirate, Italy (top 2 boats per event - 16 athletes)	China; South Korea; Germany	China; South Korea	China; ~~Russia~~; United States	Australia; China
Host nation quotas	—			
Bipartite Commission quotas (8 male, 8 female rowers - 16 athletes)	Lithuania; Kenya	Hungary; Argentina	Japan; Latvia	Austria; Zimbabwe

== Medal summary ==
=== Medal table ===
Rank	Nation	Gold	Silver	Bronze	Total
1	Great Britain (GBR)	3	0	1	4
2	Ukraine (UKR)	1	0	0	1
3	China (CHN)	0	2	0	2
4	Australia (AUS)	0	1	0	1
4	United States (USA)	0	1	0	1
6	Canada (CAN)	0	0	1	1
6	France (FRA)	0	0	1	1
6	Israel (ISR)	0	0	1	1
Totals (8 entries)		4	4	4	12

=== Medalists ===
Event	Gold	Silver	Bronze
Men's single sculls	Roman Polianskyi; Ukraine	Erik Horrie; Australia	Tom Aggar; Great Britain
Women's single sculls	Rachel Morris; Great Britain	Wang Lili; China	Moran Samuel; Israel
Mixed double sculls	Great Britain (GBR); Lauren Rowles; Laurence Whiteley	China (CHN); Liu Shuang; Fei Tianming	France (FRA); Perle Bouge; Stéphane Tardieu
Mixed coxed four	Great Britain (GBR); Grace Clough; Daniel Brown; Pam Relph; James Fox; Oliver James	United States (USA); Jaclyn Smith; Danielle Hansen; Zachary Burns; Dorian Weber; Jennifer Sichel	Canada (CAN); Victoria Nolan; Meghan Montgomery; Andrew Todd; Curtis Halladay; Kristen Kit

== See also ==
- Rowing at the 2016 Summer Olympics
