= 2019 World Rowing Championships – PR3 Women's coxless pair =

PR3 Women's coxless pair at the 2019 World Rowing Championships
- Venue: Linz-Ottensheim
- Location: Ottensheim, Austria
- Dates: 28–30 August
- Competitors: 4 from 2 nations
- Winning time: 8:06.51

Medalists
gold medal	Molly Moore; Jaclyn Smith	United States
silver medal	Greta Muti; Maryam Afgei	Italy

The PR3 women's coxless pair competition at the 2019 World Rowing Championships took place at the Linz-Ottensheim regatta venue, in Austria.

== Schedule ==
The schedule was as follows:

Date	Time	Round
Wednesday 28 August 2019	17:26	Test race
Friday 30 August 2019	14:11	Final

All times are Central European Summer Time (UTC+2)

== Results ==
=== Test race ===
With fewer than seven entries in this event, boats contested a race for lanes before the final.

Rank	Rowers	Country	Time
1	Jaclyn Smith; Molly Moore	United States	8:55.53
2	Greta Muti; Maryam Afgei	Italy	10:17.00

=== Final ===
The final determined the rankings.

Rank	Rowers	Country	Time
1st place, gold medalist(s)	Molly Moore; Jaclyn Smith	United States	8:06.51
2nd place, silver medalist(s)	Greta Muti; Maryam Afgei	Italy	9:20.71
