= Alan Sherman (disambiguation) =

Alan Sherman (born 1957) is a computer scientist.

Alan, Allan, or Al Sherman may also refer to:

- Allan Sherman (1924–1973), American comedy writer, television producer, and song parodist
- Alan Sherman (rowing) (born 1951), British rowing coxswain
- Al Sherman (1897–1973), American Tin Pan Alley songwriter
- Alan Sherman, co-worker and son of race horse trainer Art Sherman, the trainer of record for California Chrome

== See also ==
- Allie Sherman (1923–2015), American NFL running back and head coach
