= Molly Moore =

Molly Moore may refer to:

- Molly Moore (baseball) (Maurice Moore, d. 1881), infielder for the Brooklyn Atlantics
- Molly Moore (rower) (born 1995), American adaptive rower
