= Victoria Nolan =

Canadian rower

Personal information
- Nationality: Canadian
- Born: January 3, 1975 (age 51) Liverpool, England
Medal record
Pararowing
Representing Canada
Paralympic Games
Bronze medal – third place	2016 Rio de Janeiro	LTAMix4+
World Championships
Gold medal – first place	2010 Cambridge	LTAMix4+
Silver medal – second place	2011 Bled	LTAMix4+
Bronze medal – third place	2007 Oberschleißheim	LTAMix4+
Bronze medal – third place	2015 Aiguebelette-le-Lac	LTAMix4+

Victoria Nolan (born January 3, 1975, in Liverpool, England) is a pararower for Canada's National Rowing Team.

In 2010, she and her crew (LTAMix4+) won gold at the 2010 World Rowing Championships in Cambridge, New Zealand. She has competed in numerous other World Championships, as well as the 2008 and 2016 Summer Paralympics.

In 2010, Nolan and her teammate, Meghan Montgomery, won gold in the women's pair at the World Rowing Master Regatta in St. Catharines, Ontario.

Nolan's book, Beyond Vision: The Story of a Blind Rower, was published in 2014 by Iguana Books.
