= 2022 World Rowing Championships – PR2 Women's single sculls =

PR2 Women's single sculls at the 2022 World Rowing Championships
- Venue: Labe aréna
- Location: Račice, Czech Republic
- Dates: 19 September – 23 September
- Competitors: 4 from 4 nations
- Winning time: 9:25.23

Medalists
gold medal	Katie O'Brien	Ireland
silver medal	Kathryn Ross	Australia
bronze medal	Anna Aisanova	Ukraine

The PR2 women's single sculls competition at the 2022 World Rowing Championships took place at the Račice regatta venue.

== Schedule ==
The schedule was as follows:

Date	Time	Round
Monday 19 September 2022	09:40	Heats
Friday 23 September 2022	13:18	Final A

All times are Central European Summer Time (UTC+2)

== Results ==
All boats advanced directly to Final A.

=== Heat ===
Rank	Rower	Country	Time	Notes
1	Kathryn Ross	Australia	9:25.84	FA
2	Katie O'Brien	Ireland	9:47.38	FA
3	Anna Aisanova	Ukraine	10:09.39	FA
4	Jennifer Fitz-Roy	United States	11:23.73	FA

=== Final A ===
The final determined the rankings.

Rank	Rower	Country	Time	Notes
1st place, gold medalist(s)	Katie O'Brien	Ireland	9:25.23	
2nd place, silver medalist(s)	Kathryn Ross	Australia	9:35.35	
3rd place, bronze medalist(s)	Anna Aisanova	Ukraine	10:09.24	
4	Jennifer Fitz-Roy	United States	11:33.72	
