= Rob Jones (rower) =

American rower

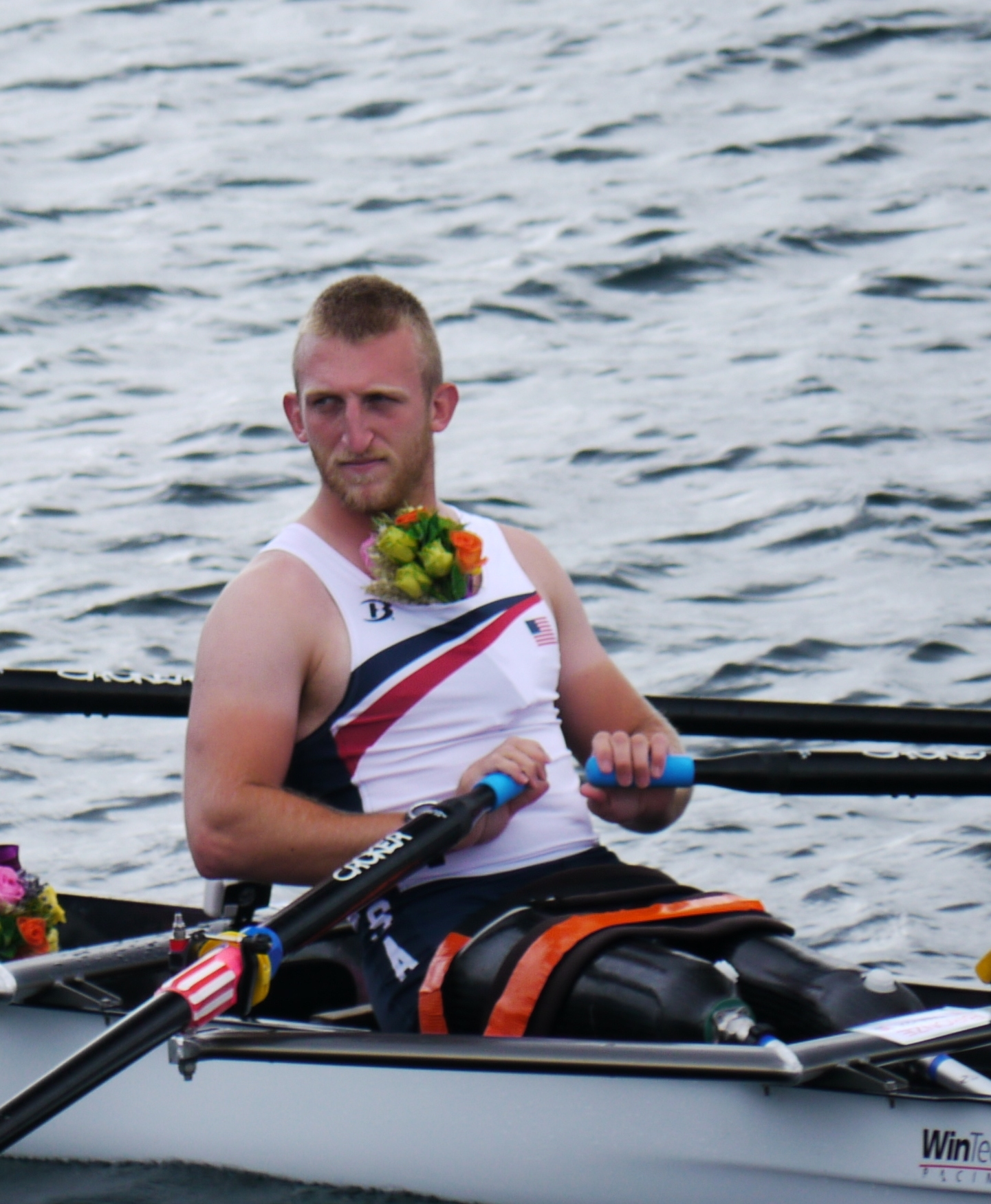
- Jones at 2012 Paralympic Games

Personal details
- Born: Robert R. Jones; September 7, 1985 (age 41) Lovettsville, Virginia
- Education: Virginia Tech (BA)
- Awards: Purple Heart
- Website: http://www.robjonesjourney.com

Military service
- Allegiance: United States of America
- Branch/service: United States Marine Corps
- Years of service: 2006–2011
- Rank: Sergeant
- Battles/wars: Iraq War; War in Afghanistan

Robert R. Jones (born September 7, 1985) is an American farmer, Marine Corps veteran, motivational speaker, Paralympic athlete, and politician. In 2010, while serving in Afghanistan, he was severely wounded in action by an improvised explosive device where he lost both legs above the knee. Jones made headlines when he completed 31 consecutive marathons in 31 days while raising money for veterans. Between 2013 and 2014, he cycled nearly 5,200 miles across the United States in order to raise awareness for wounded veterans. He also won a bronze medal with Oksana Masters in mixed double sculls (rowing) at the 2012 Summer Paralympics.

He was a candidate for the Republican nomination in Virginia's 10th congressional district for the 2020 elections, losing in the Republican primary to Aliscia Andrews.

== Early life ==
In 2003, Jones graduated from Loudoun Valley High School in Purcellville, Virginia. While he participated in football and wrestling during his freshman and sophomore years, respectively, he was not a star athlete in high school. He joined United States Marine Corps Reserve during his junior year at Virginia Tech in 2006. It was in the Marine Corps that he found that running was "a natural fit for him." In 2007, Jones graduated with a Bachelor of Arts (BA) degree in interdisciplinary studies with minors in astronomy and geology.

== Marine Corps service ==
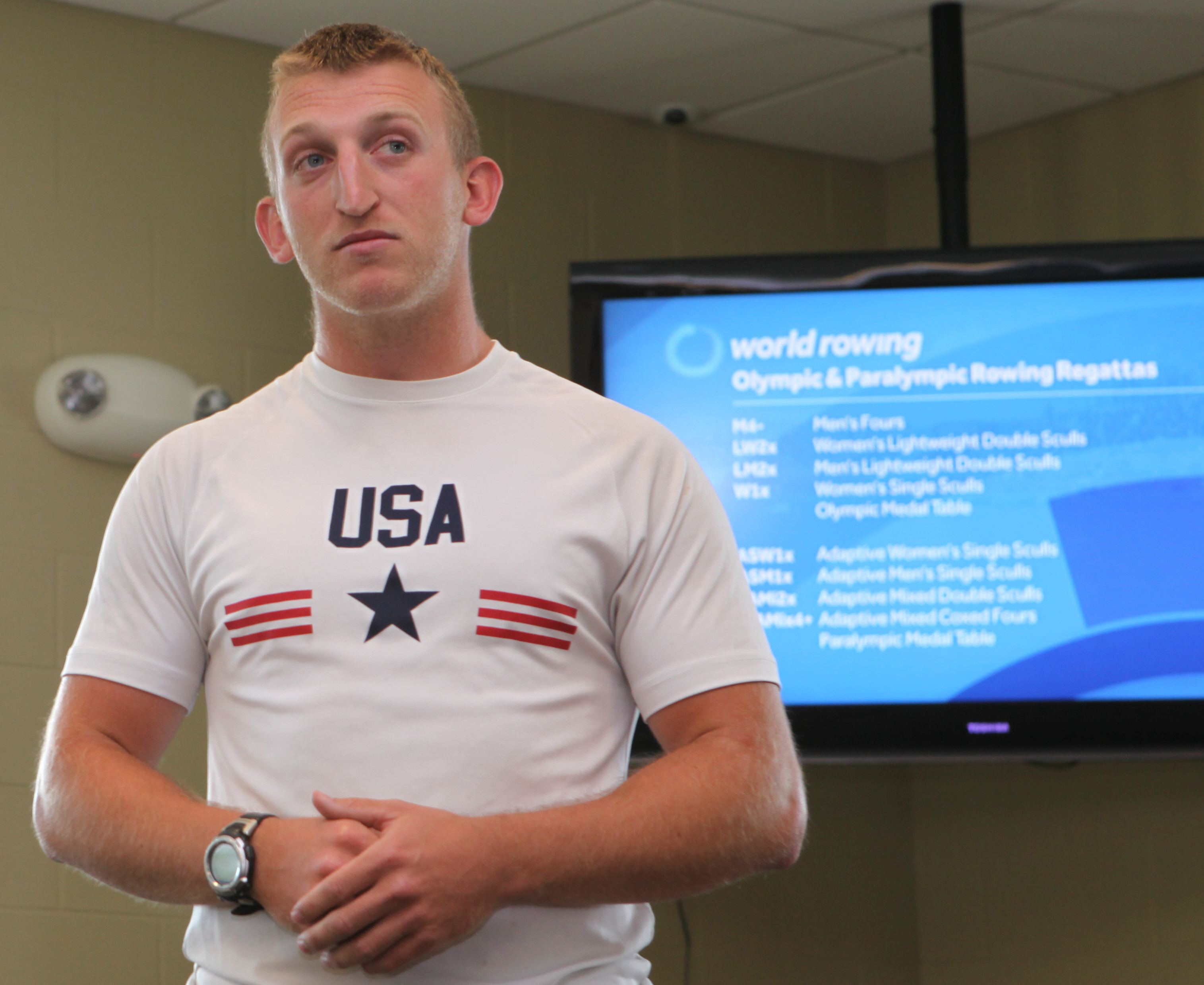
Jones speaking at Camp Lejeune in 2013

Jones was a combat engineer who served in 4th Combat Engineer Battalion. He was attached to 2nd Battalion, 24th Marines in 2008 during the Iraq War and 3rd Battalion, 7th Marines in 2010 during the War in Afghanistan. Jones was wounded in action by an improvised explosive device on July 22, 2010, in Sangin, Afghanistan. He was evacuated to Walter Reed National Military Medical Center in Bethesda, Maryland a couple of days following the incident. As a result of the explosion, Jones lost both of his legs above the knee. He received the Purple Heart. Jones was discharged from the Marines as a sergeant in December 2011.

== Political career ==
On July 22, 2019, nine years to the day of the military action that cost him his legs, Jones announced that he was running for the Republican nomination for the United States House of Representatives in Virginia's 10th congressional district, challenging Democratic first-term incumbent Jennifer Wexton. Jones lost in the Republican primary to fellow Marine Corps veteran Aliscia Andrews.

== Personal life ==
Jones resides with his wife on a farm outside of Middleburg, Virginia. They manage their farm together where they grow vegetables.
