= 2018 World Rowing Championships – PR3 Women's coxless pair =

PR3 Women's coxless pair at the 2018 World Rowing Championships
- Venue: Plovdiv Regatta Venue
- Location: Plovdiv, Bulgaria
- Dates: 15 September
- Competitors: 2 from 1 nation
- Winning time: 7:39.30

Medalists
gold medal	Danielle Hansen; Jaclyn Smith	United States

The PR3 women's coxless pair competition at the 2018 World Rowing Championships in Plovdiv took place at the Plovdiv Regatta Venue.

== Schedule ==
The schedule was as follows:

Date	Time	Round
Saturday 15 September 2018	14:46	Final

All times are Eastern European Summer Time (UTC+3)

== Results ==
With fewer than seven entries in this event, a direct final was held to determine the rankings.

Rank	Rowers	Country	Time	Notes
1st place, gold medalist(s)	Danielle Hansen; Jaclyn Smith	United States	7:39.30	WB
