= Daniel Brown (rower) =

British rower (born 1982)

Daniel Brown MBE
Personal information
- Born: 29 November 1982 (age 43) Reading, Berkshire, Great Britain
- Height: 195 cm (6 ft 5 in)
- Weight: 85 kg (187 lb)

Sport
- Country: Great Britain
- Sport: Adaptive rowing
- Retired: 2020
Medal record
Adaptive rowing
Representing Great Britain
Paralympic Games
Gold medal – first place	2016 Rio de Janeiro	LTAMix4+
World Championships
Gold medal – first place	2014 Amsterdam	LTAMix4+
Gold medal – first place	2015 Aiguebelette-le-Lac	LTAMix4+
Gold medal – first place	2018 Plovdiv	PR3Mix4+

Daniel Brown (born 29 November 1982) is a retired British pararower who competed at international-level events. He is a Paralympic champion, a triple world champion and a double world cup champion in the mixed coxed four with Grace Clough, Pam Relph, James Fox and Oliver James.

Brown was a keen football and rugby league player when he was in his teenage years and played for Wokingham. He was involved in a car accident in 2003 which caused him to have life-changing injuries: he couldn't put weight on his ankle and he severed nerves in his left arm.

At the 2016 Rio Paralympics, Brown took gold in the mixed coxed four alongside Pam Relph, Grace Clough, James Fox and Oliver James.

He was appointed Member of the Order of the British Empire (MBE) in the 2017 New Year Honours for services to rowing.
