= Gaetano Iannuzzi =

Italian rower

Personal information
- National team: Italy
- Born: 5 March 1972 (age 54) Portici, Italy
- Height: 1.59 m (5 ft 3 in)
- Weight: 50 kg (110 lb)

Sport
- Sport: Rowing (1991–2009); Pararowing (2017–present)
- Disability class: PR3
- Club: Canottieri Aniene
- Retired: 2009 (rowing)

Achievements and titles
- Olympic finals: 2
Medal record
Rowing
Event	1st	2nd	3rd
World Championships	1	3	3
World Junior Championships	0	1	0
Total	1	4	3
World Championships
Gold medal – first place	1991 Vienna	Lwt eight
Silver medal – second place	1997 Aiguebelette	Coxed four
Silver medal – second place	2005 Kaizu, Gifu	Eight
Silver medal – second place	2006 Dorney	Eight
Bronze medal – third place	1993 Račice	Lwt eight
Bronze medal – third place	1994 Indianapolis	Lwt eight
Bronze medal – third place	1995 Tampere	Lwt eight
Pararowing
Event	1st	2nd	3rd
World Championships	0	0	1
Bronze medal – third place	2017 Sarasota	Coxed four P2

Gaetano Iannuzzi (born 5 March 1972) is an Italian rowing coach and former coxswain who later participated as a coxswain in the paralympic sports, also winning an international medal in the competitions reserved for paralympic athletes.

== Biography ==
After finished his sports career as an athlete, Iannuzzi had become a rowing coach. He became a paralympic athlete in 2017 following a serious road accident had in 1998, however continued to compete with not disabled athletes until 2009.

He has had a long career, and last competed in 2017, when he won bronze at the 2017 Championships in Sarasota, Florida in PR3 mixed coxed four, an adaptive rowing class. At young level he won a gold medal at the 1991 World Rowing Championships in Vienna with the lightweight men's eight.

From 1999 to 2009 Iannuzzi participated in sixteen editions of World Rowing Championships.

== Achievements ==
Year	Competition	Venue	Rank	Event	Time
1991	World Championships	(Austria) Vienna	1st	Lightweight Eight	6:13.21
1993	World Championships	(Czech Republic) Račice	3rd	Lightweight Eight	5:41.53
1994	World Championships	(United States) Indianapolis	3rd	Lightweight Eight	5:34.63
1995	World Championships	(Finland) Tampere	3rd	Lightweight Eight	5:58.77
1997	World Championships	(France) Aiguebelette-le-Lac	2nd	Coxed Four	6:05.98
2000	Olympic Games	(Australia) Sydney	4th	Eight	5:35.37
2004	Olympic Games	(Greece) Athens	7th	Eight	5:46.36
2005	World Championships	(Japan) Kaizu	2nd	Eight	5:24.01
2006	World Championships	(United Kingdom) Eton	2nd	Eight	5:23.29

== See also ==
- Italy at the 2000 Summer Olympics
- Italy at the 2004 Summer Olympics
