= 2023 World Rowing Championships – PR2 Women's single sculls =

PR2 Women's single sculls at the 2023 World Rowing Championships
- Venue: Lake Sava
- Location: Belgrade, Serbia
- Dates: 5 September – 8 September
- Competitors: 1 from 1 nation
- Winning time: 12:03.39

Medalists
gold medal	Anna Aisanova	Ukraine

The PR2 women's single sculls competition at the 2023 World Rowing Championships took place at Lake Sava, in Belgrade.

== Schedule ==
The schedule was as follows:

Date	Time	Round
Tuesday 5 September 2023	14:04	Heats
Friday 8 September 2023	16:09	Final

All times are Central European Summer Time (UTC+2)

== Results ==
The only boat advanced directly to the final.

=== Heat ===
Rank	Rower	Country	Time	Notes
1	Anna Aisanova	Ukraine	10:39.62	F

=== Final ===
The final determined the rankings.

Rank	Rower	Country	Time
1st place, gold medalist(s)	Anna Aisanova	Ukraine	12:03.39
