= Anna Corderoy =

British rowing coxswain

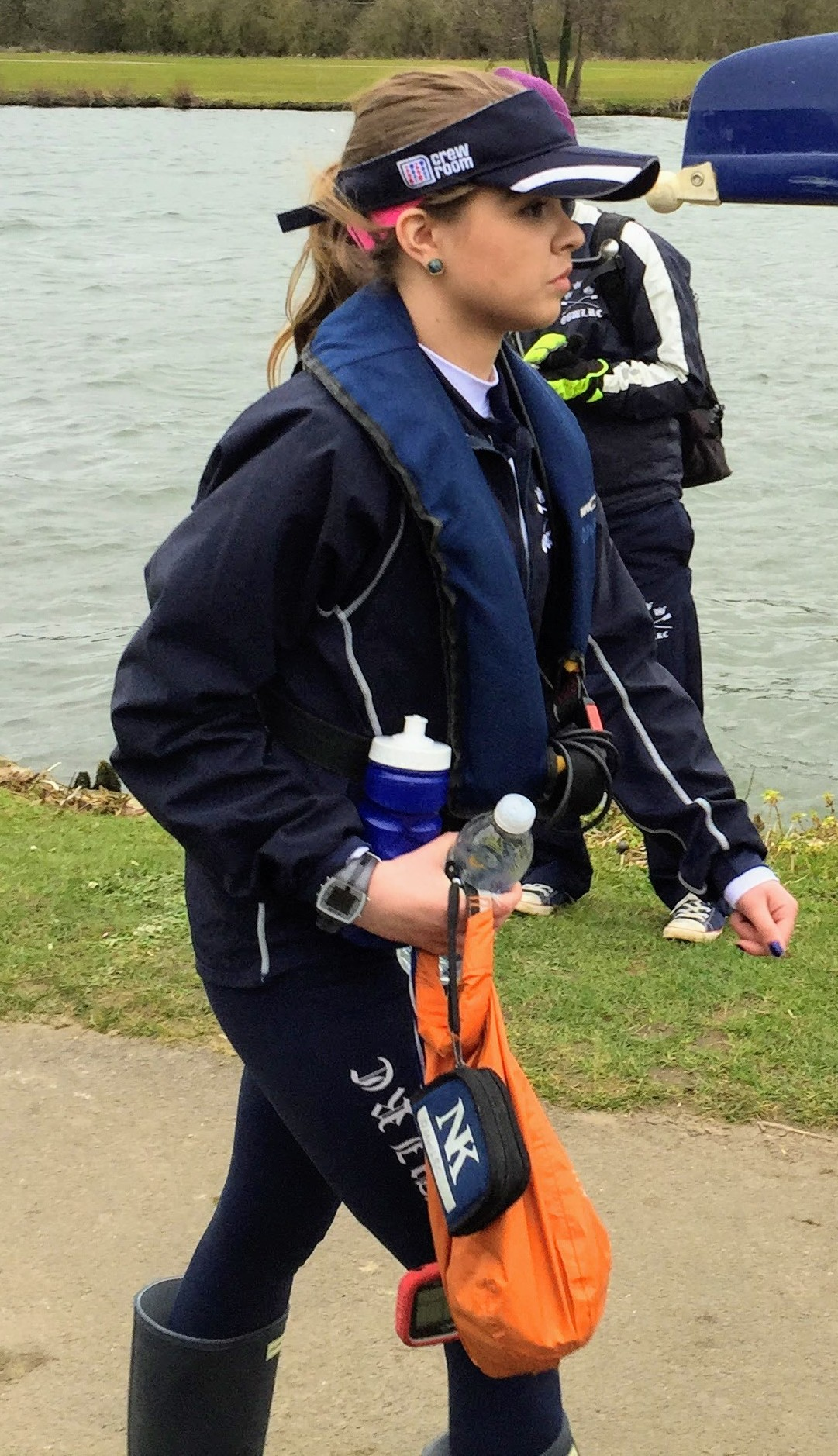

Personal information
- Nationality: British
- Born: 28 December 1994 (age 31) Cheltenham, England
- Education: St Catherine's College, Oxford

Sport
- Country: Great Britain
- Sport: Rowing (sport) & Pararowing
- University team: Oxford University Women's Lightweight Rowing Club
- Club: Molesey Boat Club
- Personal best: 2017 PR3 4+ World Record: 6:55.70
Medal record
Representing Great Britain
World Championships
Gold medal – first place	2017 Sarasota	PR3 Mixed coxed four

Anna Corderoy (born 28 December 1994) is a British rowing coxswain.

== Early life ==
Corderoy attended Stroud High School in Gloucestershire, where she was Head Girl. In 2013 she went up to the University of Oxford to read for a Bachelor of Arts in English Language and Literature at St Catherine's College.

== Rowing ==
Corderoy started rowing while an undergraduate at Oxford, where she quickly realised that she was better suited to coxing than rowing. She joined the Oxford University Women's Lightweight Rowing Club for the 2014/15 season, where she coxed the reserve boat, Tethys, in the 2015 Henley Boat Races. Returning for the 2015/16 season she became cox of the Blue boat that beat Cambridge at the 2016 Henley Boat Race. In the summer of 2017, Corderoy coxed the Team Keane Ladies Plate crew to victory in the B final of Tier 2 VIIIs at Marlow Regatta, held at Eton Dorney lake. After graduation, Corderoy moved to London to start training as a solicitor. She joined Molesey Boat Club and was invited to join Great Britain's national Pararowing team.

Her first international event was the Gavirate International Regatta in Italy in 2017, where she won as part of the PR3 (formerly LTA) mixed coxed four with Emma Tod, Grace Clough, James Fox, and Oliver Stanhope. They finished 17 seconds ahead of the Ukrainian boat in the first final of the day. The PR3 crew repeated this performance on Sunday, with Rob Sargent replacing Stanhope in the lineup.

At the 2017 World Rowing Championships in Sarasota, Florida, Corderoy coxed the PR3 Mixed coxed four crew of Grace Clough, Giedrė Rakauskaitė, James Fox and Oliver Stanhope, where they won the gold medal, posting a world best time of 6 minutes 55.7 seconds.
