= 2019 World Rowing Championships – PR2 Women's single sculls =

PR2 Women's single sculls at the 2019 World Rowing Championships
- Venue: Linz-Ottensheim
- Location: Ottensheim, Austria
- Dates: 28–30 August
- Competitors: 6 from 6 nations
- Winning time: 9:37.30

Medalists
gold medal	Kathryn Ross	Australia
silver medal	Annika van der Meer	Netherlands
bronze medal	Katie O'Brien	Ireland

The PR2 women's single sculls competition at the 2019 World Rowing Championships took place at the Linz-Ottensheim regatta venue.

== Schedule ==
The schedule was as follows:

Date	Time	Round
Wednesday 28 August 2019	09:38	Test race
Friday 30 August 2019	13:05	Final

All times are Central European Summer Time (UTC+2)

== Results ==
=== Test race ===
With fewer than seven entries in this event, boats contested a race for lanes before the final.

Rank	Rower	Country	Time	Notes
1	Kathryn Ross	Australia	9:24.99	WB
2	Annika van der Meer	Netherlands	9:44.80	
3	Katie O'Brien	Ireland	9:52.13	
4	Madison Eberhard	United States	10:31.83	
5	Žanna Cvečkovska	Latvia	10:37.08	
–	Shao Shasha	China	DNS	

=== Final ===
The final determined the rankings.

Rank	Rower	Country	Time
1st place, gold medalist(s)	Kathryn Ross	Australia	9:37.30
2nd place, silver medalist(s)	Annika van der Meer	Netherlands	9:56.84
3rd place, bronze medalist(s)	Katie O'Brien	Ireland	10:01.64
4	Madison Eberhard	United States	10:39.10
5	Žanna Cvečkovska	Latvia	10:46.56
