= Anna Aisanova =

Ukrainian Paralympic rower (born 1998)

Personal information
- Native name: Анна Айсанова
- Born: 30 May 1998 (age 28)

Sport
- Country: Ukraine
- Sport: Pararowing
- Disability class: PR2
Medal record
Pararowing
Representing Ukraine
World Championships
Gold medal – first place	2023 Belgrade	PR2 W1x
Bronze medal – third place	2022 Račice	PR2 W1x
European Championships
Silver medal – second place	2025 Plovdiv	PR2 Mix2x
Silver medal – second place	2026 Varese	PR2 Mix2x
Bronze medal – third place	2024 Szeged	PR2 Mix2x

Anna Aisanova (Ukrainian: Анна Айсанова; born 30 May 1998) is a Ukrainian pararower. She represented Ukraine at the 2024 Summer Paralympics.

== Career ==
Aisanova competed at the 2022 World Rowing Championships and won a bronze medal in the PR2 single sculls. She again competed at the 2023 World Rowing Championships and won a gold medal in the PR2 single sculls event.

In April 2024, she competed at the 2024 European Rowing Championships and won a bronze medal in the PR2 mixed double sculls, along with Iaroslav Koiuda. She then represented Ukraine at the 2024 Summer Paralympics and finished in fourth place in the PR2 mixed double sculls event, along with Koiuda.

In June 2025, she competed at the 2025 European Rowing Championships and won a silver medal in the PR2 mixed double sculls, along with Koiuda. She again competed at the 2026 European Rowing Championships and won a silver medal in the PR2 mixed double sculls, along with Koiuda, finishing 0.4 seconds behind the gold medal winning German team of Jasmina Bier and Paul Umbach.
