= Jaclyn Smith (rower) =

American Paralympic rower

Personal information
- National team: United States
- Born: July 3, 1993 (age 32) New York, NY
- Height: 5 ft 9 in (175 cm)
- Weight: 150 lb (68 kg)

Sport
- Sport: rowing
- College team: Sacred Heart University
- Club: Community Rowing Inc.
Medal record
Adaptive rowing
Representing the United States
Event	1st	2nd	3rd
Paralympic Games	0	1	0
World Championships	2	3	0
Head of the Charles Regatta	4	3	0
Royal Canadian Henley Regatta	1	0	0
Total	7	4	0
Paralympic Games
Silver medal – second place	2016 Rio de Janeiro	Legs, Trunk, & Arms Mixed Four
World Championships
Gold medal – first place	2019 Ottensheim	PR3 Women's Coxless Pair
Gold medal – first place	2018 Plovdiv	PR3 Women's Coxless Pair
Silver medal – second place	2017 Sarasota	PR3 Mixed Four
Silver medal – second place	2015 Aiguebelette	Legs, Trunk, & Arms Mixed Four
Silver medal – second place	2014 Amsterdam	Legs, Trunk, & Arms Mixed Four
Royal Canadian Henley Regatta
Gold medal – first place	2015 St. Catharines	Legs, Trunk, & Arms Mixed Four
U.S. Rowing Club & Elite National Championships
Gold medal – first place	2017 Harsha Lake	Legs, Trunk, & Arms Mixed Four
Head of the Charles Regatta
Gold medal – first place	2017 Boston	Legs, Trunk, & Arms Mixed Four
Gold medal – first place	2016 Boston	Mixed Eight
Gold medal – first place	2016 Boston	Legs, Trunk, & Arms Mixed Four
Gold medal – first place	2015 Boston	Legs, Trunk, & Arms Mixed Four

Jaclyn Smith (born July 3, 1993 in Mineola, New York) is an American rower. She competed at the 2016 Summer Paralympics in Rio de Janeiro. She won three silver medals from the World Rowing Championships and a silver medal from the 2016 Paralympic Games. She is a Royal Canadian Henley Regatta champion, a four-time Head of the Charles Regatta champion, and a U.S. national champion. She was a member of the Paralympic Great Eight at the 2016 Head of the Charles Regatta consisting of gold, silver, and bronze Rio Paralympic medalists from Great Britain, United States, and Canada.

== Career ==
=== Senior career ===
==== 2013–2014 season ====
Smith won a silver medal in the Legs, Trunk, & Arms Mixed 4+ at the 2014 World Rowing Championships in Amsterdam, Netherlands.

==== 2014–2015 season ====
Smith won a silver medal in the Legs, Trunk, & Arms Mixed 4+ at the 2015 World Rowing Championships in Aiguebelette, France.

==== 2015–2016 season ====
Smith won a silver medal in the Legs, Trunk, & Arms Mixed 4+ at the 2016 Paralympic Games in Rio de Janeiro, Brazil.

==== 2016–2017 season ====
Smith won a silver medal in the PR3 Mixed 4+ at the 2017 World Rowing Championships in Sarasota, Florida.

=== Senior ===
Year	Event	Women's 8+	PR3 Mixed 4+	Mixed 8+
2014	World Championships		2nd place, silver medalist(s)	
2015	Head of the Charles Regatta		1st place, gold medalist(s)	
2015	World Championships		2nd place, silver medalist(s)	
2015	Royal Canadian Henley Regatta		1st place, gold medalist(s)	
2016	Head of the Charles Regatta		1st place, gold medalist(s)	1st place, gold medalist(s)
2016	Paralympic Games		2nd place, silver medalist(s)	
2017	Head of the Charles Regatta		1st place, gold medalist(s)	
2017	World Championships		2nd place, silver medalist(s)	
2017	U.S. Rowing Club & Elite National Championships		1st place, gold medalist(s)	
