= Graziana Saccocci =

Italian Paralympic rower

Personal information
- Born: 2 January 1960 (age 66) Milan, Italy
- Height: 167 cm (5 ft 6 in)
- Weight: 58 kg (128 lb)

Sport
- Country: Italy
- Sport: Adaptive rowing
- Event: Coxed four
Medal record
Adaptive rowing
Representing Italy
Paralympic Games
Gold medal – first place	2008 Beijing	Mixed coxed four
World Championships
Silver medal – second place	2009 Poznan	Mixed coxed four

Graziana Saccocci (born 2 January 1960) is a former Italian Paralympic rower who competed in mixed coxed four events in international level events.
