= Davinia Lefroy =

Australian Paralympic rower

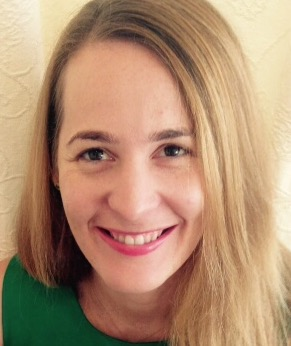
- Lefroy in February 2021

Personal information
- Occupation: Clinical psychologist

Sport
- Country: Australia
- Sport: Pararowing
- Disability: Stargardt disease

Davinia Lefroy is an Australian Paralympic rower and clinical psychologist.

== Personal life ==
At age 11, Lefroy was diagnosed with Stargardt's macular dystrophy, leaving her with only peripheral vision as an adult. After graduating St Hilda's Anglican School for Girls in 1998, she received "an Arts Degree in History and Literature", an undergraduate degree in psychology, and a master's degree in applied psychology. In 2016, she was living in Perth.

== Rowing ==
Lefroy was a rower in high school, and in 2016 was recruited by Gordon Marcks, coach for the Australian Paralympic Rowing Team.

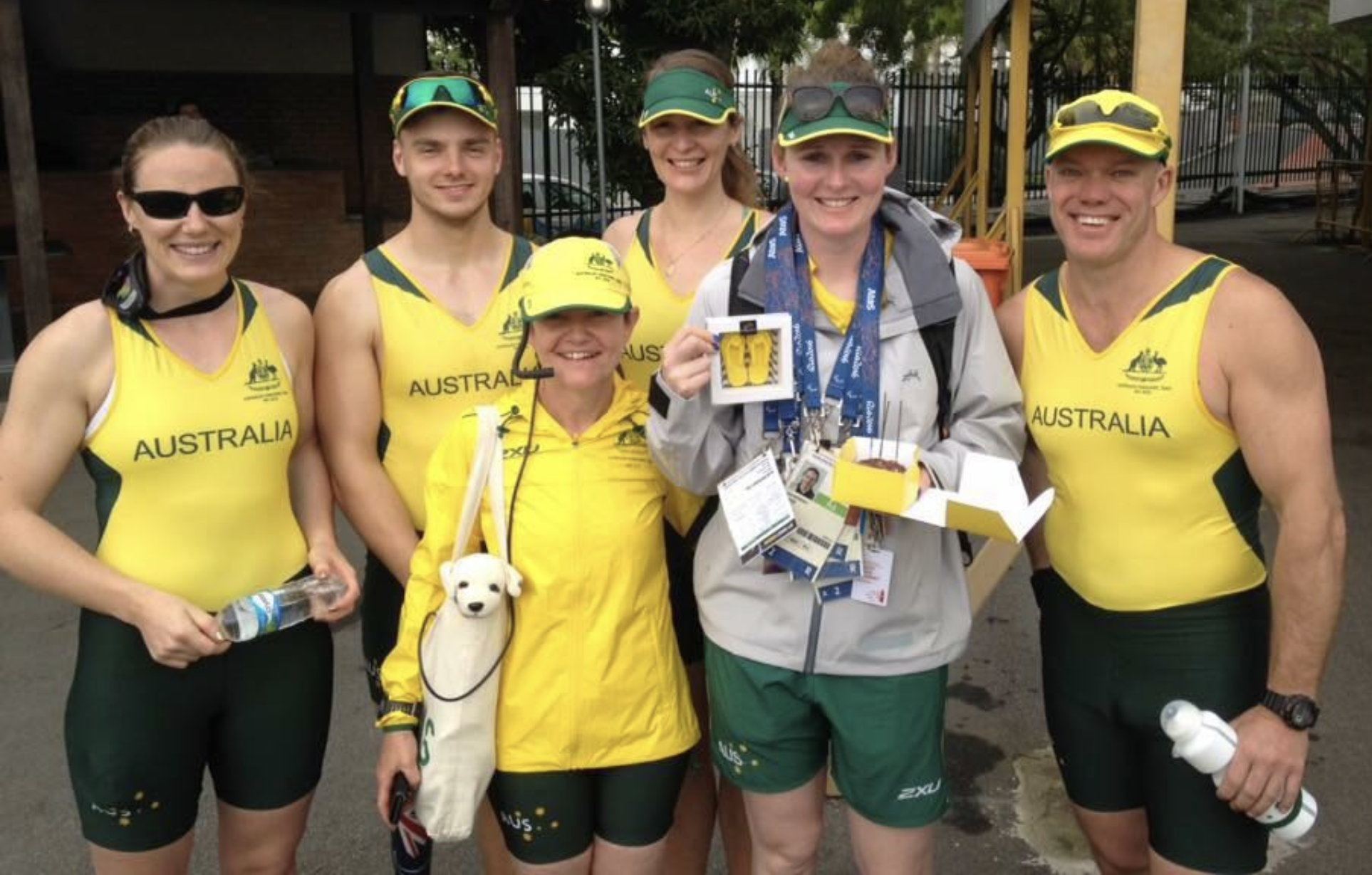
2016 Australian pararowing team

She competed for Australia at the 2016 Summer Paralympics in Legs, Trunk and Arms (LTA) mixed coxed four rowing, alongside Jeremy McGrath, Kathleen Murdoch, Brock Ingram, and Josephine Burnand. The five rowers were Australia's LTA team to qualify in pararowing. The team came in fourth in their heat, third in their repechage heat, and sixth overall.

== Career ==
With her degrees in psychology, Lefroy has worked in both public and private practice, specializing in sexuality and disability, abuse and trauma, and adolescent and early adulthood issues. As of 2016, she was a clinical psychologist living in Perth.
