= Vicki Hansford =

British Paralympic rower

Personal information
- Born: 31 October 1979 (age 46) Lewisham, England, Great Britain
- Height: 167 cm (5 ft 6 in)

Sport
- Country: Great Britain
- Sport: Adaptive rowing
- Disability: Sarcoma survivor
- Event: Coxed four
- Club: Guilford Rowing Club; Surrey University Boating Club
- Retired: 2009
Medal record
Adaptive rowing
Representing Great Britain
Paralympic Games
Bronze medal – third place	2008 Beijing	Mixed coxed four
World Championships
Gold medal – first place	2006 Dorney	LTA Mix4+
Gold medal – first place	2009 Poznań	LTA Mix4+
Silver medal – second place	2007 Oberschleißheim	LTA Mix4+

Vicki Hansford (born 31 October 1979) is a retired British Paralympic rower who competed in international level events. She was also a track athlete at national level.

Hansford lost her right leg due to sarcoma.
