= Simona Chin =

American rower (born 1980)

Personal information
- Born: 27 June 1980 (age 46) Houston, Texas, United States

Sport
- Sport: Rowing
- Club: Stanford Cardinals
Medal record
Representing United States
Paralympic Games
Silver medal – second place	2008 Beijing	Mixed coxed four

Simona Chin Campbell (born 27 June 1980) is an American former rower who was a coxswain for the US mixed coxed four team who won a silver medal at the 2008 Summer Paralympics. She now works in higher education leadership and ed-tech, having worked with 2U, GeeBee, and her current job as vice president of university relations at Leap Finance.
