= Zachary Burns =

American Paralympic rower

Personal information
- National team: United States
- Born: December 25, 1996 (age 29) Ann Arbor, Michigan
- Height: 5 ft 10 in (178 cm)
- Weight: 150 lb (68 kg)

Sport
- Sport: Rowing
- College team: University of Michigan
- Club: Community Rowing Inc.
Medal record
Legs, Trunk, & Arms Mixed Four
Representing the United States
Event	1st	2nd	3rd
Paralympic Games	0	1	0
World Championships	0	3	0
Head of the Charles Regatta	4	0	0
Royal Canadian Henley Regatta	1	0	0
Total	5	4	0
Paralympic Games
Silver medal – second place	2016 Rio de Janeiro	Legs, Trunk, & Arms Mixed Four
World Championships
Silver medal – second place	2017 Sarasota	PR3 Mixed Four
Silver medal – second place	2015 Aiguebelette	Legs, Trunk, & Arms Mixed Four
Silver medal – second place	2014 Amsterdam	Legs, Trunk, & Arms Mixed Four
Royal Canadian Henley Regatta
Gold medal – first place	2015 St. Catharines	Legs, Trunk, & Arms Mixed Four
U.S. Rowing Club & Elite National Championships
Gold medal – first place	2017 Harsha Lake	Legs, Trunk, & Arms Mixed Doubles
Gold medal – first place	2017 Harsha Lake	Legs, Trunk, & Arms Mixed Four
Head of the Charles Regatta
Gold medal – first place	2017 Boston	Legs, Trunk, & Arms Mixed Four
Gold medal – first place	2016 Boston	Mixed Eight
Gold medal – first place	2016 Boston	Legs, Trunk, & Arms Mixed Four
Gold medal – first place	2015 Boston	Legs, Trunk, & Arms Mixed Four

Zachary Burns (born December 25, 1996) is an American rower. He competed at the 2016 Summer Paralympics in Rio de Janeiro. Burns has won three silver medals from the World Rowing Championships and a silver medal from the 2016 Paralympic Games. He is a Royal Canadian Henley Regatta champion, four-time Head of the Charles Regatta champion, and two-time U.S. national champion. He was a member of the Paralympic Great Eight at the 2016 Head of the Charles Regatta consisting of gold, silver, and bronze Rio Paralympic medalists from Great Britain, United States, and Canada.

== Career ==
=== Senior career ===
==== 2013–14 season ====
Burns won a silver medal in the Legs, Trunk, & Arms Mixed 4+ at the 2014 World Rowing Championships in Amsterdam, Netherlands.

==== 2014–15 season ====
Burns won a silver medal in the Legs, Trunk, & Arms Mixed 4+ at the 2015 World Rowing Championships in Aiguebelette, France.

==== 2015–16 season ====
Burns won a silver medal in the Legs, Trunk, & Arms Mixed 4+ at the 2016 Paralympic Games in Rio de Janeiro, Brazil.

==== 2016–17 season ====
Burns won a silver medal in the PR3 Mixed 4+ at the 2017 World Rowing Championships in Sarasota, Florida.

=== Senior ===
Year	Event	LTA Mixed 2x	Men's 8+	PR3 Mixed 4+	Mixed 8+
2014	World Championships			2nd place, silver medalist(s)	
2015	Head of the Charles Regatta			1st place, gold medalist(s)	
2015	World Championships			2nd place, silver medalist(s)	
2015	Royal Canadian Henley Regatta			1st place, gold medalist(s)	
2016	Head of the Charles Regatta			1st place, gold medalist(s)	1st place, gold medalist(s)
2016	Paralympic Games			2nd place, silver medalist(s)	
2017	Head of the Charles Regatta			1st place, gold medalist(s)	
2017	World Championships			2nd place, silver medalist(s)	
2017	U.S. Rowing Club & Elite National Championships	1st place, gold medalist(s)		1st place, gold medalist(s)	
