= Alan Sherman (rowing) =

British rower

Personal information
- Born: 22 October 1951 (age 74)

Sport
- Sport: Rowing
- Club: Thames Tradesmen's Rowing Club
Medal record
Rowing
Representing Great Britain
Paralympic Games
Bronze medal – third place	2008 Beijing	Mixed coxed four
World Rowing Championships
Gold medal – first place	2006 Dorney	LTA Mixed coxed four
Silver medal – second place	2007 Oberschleißheim	LTA Mixed coxed four
Bronze medal – third place	1975 Nottingham	Lightweight eight

Alan Sherman (born 22 October 1951) is a coxswain who competed for Great Britain.

== Rowing career ==
Sherman was selected by Great Britain as part of the lightweight eight that secured a bronze medal at the 1975 World Rowing Championships.
