= Paola Protopapa =

Italian para rower, alpine skier and sailor

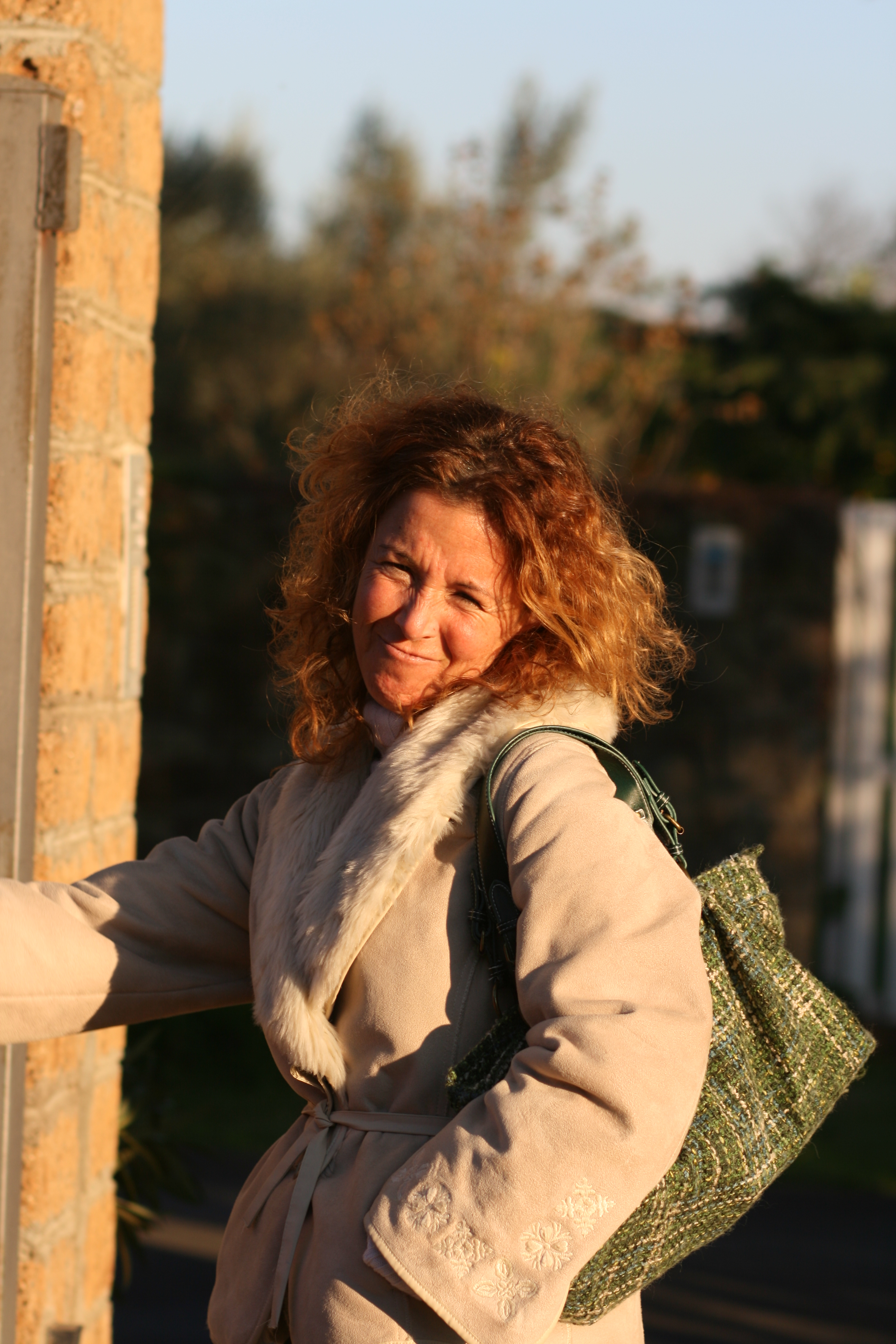

Personal information
- Born: 6 May 1965 (age 61) Rome, Italy
- Height: 169 cm (5 ft 7 in)
- Weight: 58 kg (128 lb)

Sport
- Country: Italy
- Sport: Adaptive rowing
- Event: Coxed four
Medal record
Adaptive rowing
Representing Italy
Paralympic Games
Gold medal – first place	2008 Beijing	Mixed coxed four
World Championships
Silver medal – second place	2013 Poznan	LTA Mix4+
Bronze medal – third place	2017 Sarasota	LTA Mix4+

Paola Protopapa (born 6 May 1965) is a former Italian Paralympic rower, Alpine skier and sailor who competed in international level events.

In 1987, Protopapa lost the use of her left elbow after an accident which caused her to have elbow disarticulation.

== Achievements ==
Year	Competition	Venue	Rank	Event	Time
Para rowing
2008	Summer Paralympics	(China) Beijing	1st	Mixed coxed four	3:33.13
Para cross-country skiing
2010	Winter Paralympics	(Canada) Vancouver	13th	5 km Classic Style - Standing	
2010	Winter Paralympics	(Canada) Vancouver	16th	1 km Sprint Classic Style - Standing	
Para cycling
2012	Summer Paralympics	(United Kingdom) London	12th	Three-Person Keelboat	
