= Emma Preuschl =

American rower (born 1984)

Personal information
- Born: 13 October 1984 (age 41) Indianapolis, Indiana, United States

Sport
- Sport: Adaptive rowing
- Disability: Erb's palsy
- Club: Purdue Crew Club
Medal record
Representing United States
Paralympic Games
Silver medal – second place	2008 Beijing	Mixed coxed four

Emma Preuschl (born 13 October 1984) is an American former rower who competed at international rowing competitions. She is a Paralympic silver medalist at the 2008 Summer Paralympics.

Preuschl was introduced to rowing when she was 14 years old by her aunt in Wisconsin. She has rowed for Purdue University for four years, she trained in Oklahoma City where the US Olympic and Paralympic rowing training site is based.
