= Jeremy McGrath (rower) =

Australian Paralympic rower

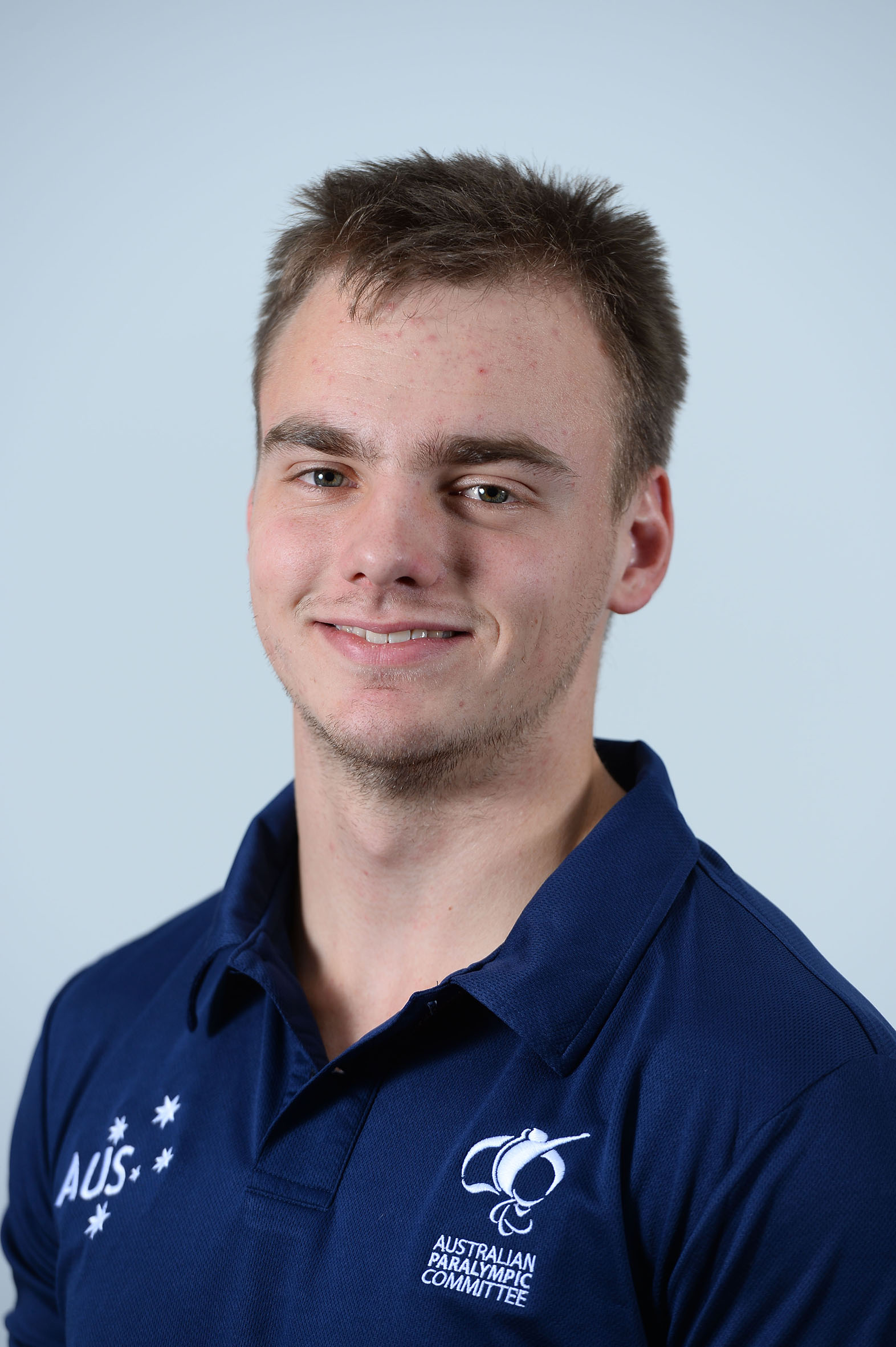
- 2016 Australian Paralympic team portrait

Personal information
- Nickname: Jezza
- Born: 21 April 1994 (age 32)
- Home town: Sydney, New South Wales, Australia
- Height: 180 cm (5 ft 11 in)
- Weight: 80 kg (176 lb)

Sport
- Country: Australia
- Sport: Rowing
- Club: Balmain Rowing Club
- Coached by: Tara Huntly
Medal record
World Championships
Silver medal – second place	2014 Amsterdam	Mixed double sculls – LTAMix2x

Jeremy McGrath (born 21 April 1994) is an Australian Paralympic rower. He represented Australia at the 2016 Rio Paralympics.

== Personal ==
McGrath was born on 21 April 1994. He was born without a fibula and with a slightly shortened tibia in his right leg. In 2009, at aged 15, he underwent elective surgery to have his leg removed below the knee due to difficulties in using prosthesis. His mother decided to let him make the decision to amputate his leg. Before the amputation he played soccer. In 2016, he is studying occupational therapy at the University of Sydney.

== Career ==
During the 2012 London Olympics, he decided to pursue rowing. In December 2012, he joined the Macquarie University Rowing Club and in 2013 attended an Australian Paralympic Committee Paralympic Talent Search session. In May 2013, he started to row with Barbara Ramjan at Balmain Rowing Club, which had a strong adaptive rowing program. His first competition was in June 2013 at JB Sharp winter series of regattas. At the 2014 Australian Championships, he won gold in the LTA M1 x, LTA 2 x and LTA 4 +. He made his World Rowing Championships debut with Kathleen Murdoch, a vision impaired rower at the 2014 World Rowing Championships in Amsterdam, Netherlands. They won the silver medal in the Legs, Trunk and Arms Mixed Double Scull (LTAMix2x). They were coached by Lindsay Callaghan. He combined with Brock Ingram, Davinia Lefroy, Kathleen Murdoch and coxswain Jo Burnand in the Legs, Trunk and Arms Mixed Coxed Four (LTAMix4+) to win the Final Paralympic Qualification Regatta in April 2016. At the 2016 Rio Paralympics, McGrath was a member of the LTA Mixed Coxed Four that finished first in the LTAMix4+ B Final.

He is currently a member of the Balmain Rowing Club.

== Recognition ==
- Rowing NSW Novice of the Year, 2014
