= Curtis Halladay =

Canadian rower

Personal information
- Born: 14 February 1995 (age 31) Sudbury, Ontario, Canada

Sport
- Country: Canada
- Sport: Adaptive rowing
- Disability: Foot drop
Medal record
Adaptive rowing
Representing Canada
Paralympic Games
Bronze medal – third place	2016 Rio de Janeiro	Mixed coxed four
World Rowing Championships
Bronze medal – third place	2015 Aiguebelette	LTAMix4+

Curtis Halladay (born February 14, 1995) is a Canadian adaptive rower who competes in international elite events. He is a Paralympic bronze medalist and a World bronze medalist in the mixed coxed four.
