= Oliver James (rower) =

British rower

Oliver James MBE
Personal information
- Born: 5 October 1990 (age 35) Stevenage, Great Britain
- Height: 1.70 m (5 ft 7 in)

Sport
- Country: Great Britain
- Sport: Adaptive rowing
- Club: Leander Club, Henley on Thames
Medal record
Adaptive rowing
Representing Great Britain
Paralympic Games
Gold medal – first place	2016 Rio de Janeiro	Mixed coxed four
World Rowing Championships
Gold medal – first place	2013 Chungju	LTAMix4+
Gold medal – first place	2014 Amsterdam	LTAMix4+
Gold medal – first place	2015 Aiguebelette-le-Lac	LTAMix4+

Oliver James, MBE (born 5 October 1990) is a British adaptive rower who competes in international elite events. He is a triple World champion and Paralympic champion in the mixed coxed four.
