= Alessandro Franzetti =

Italian Paralympic rower

Personal information
- Born: 16 May 1991 (age 35) Angera, Italy

Sport
- Country: Italy
- Sport: Para Rowing
Medal record
Event	1st	2nd	3rd
Paralympic Games	1	0	0

Alessandro Franzetti (born 16 May 1991) is an Italian paralympic rower who won a gold medal as cox at the 2008 Summer Paralympics (he was seventeen).
