= John Maclean (sportsperson) =

Australian triathlete, rower and motivational speaker

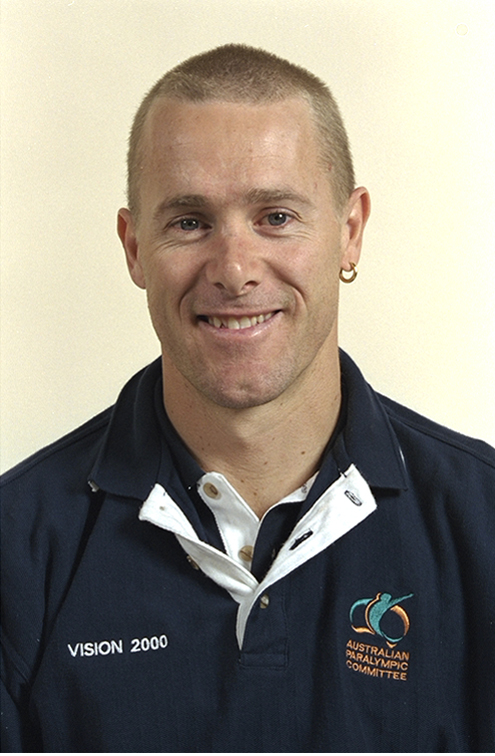
- 2000 Australian Paralympic team portrait of Maclean

Personal information
- Full name: John Alexander Maclean
- Nationality: Australia
- Born: 27 May 1966 (age 60) Caringbah, Australia
- Website: johnmclean.com.au
Medal record
Rowing
Paralympic Games
| Silver medal – second place | 2008 Beijing | Mixed Double Sculls TAMix2x |

John Alexander Maclean, OAM (born 27 May 1966) is an Australian triathlete, rower, and motivational speaker. A promising rugby league player in his youth, he became a paraplegic after being knocked from his bicycle by a truck in 1988. He subsequently became the first paraplegic to finish the Ironman World Championship and the first to swim the English Channel. Later, he was part of the athletics team at both the Olympics and Paralympics in 2000, and won a silver medal in rowing at the 2008 Beijing Paralympics. In 2014, he completed the Nepean Triathlon without using a wheelchair, after regaining some use of his legs through Ware K Tremor therapy. He is the founder of the John Maclean Foundation, which assists wheelchair users under the age of 18. As a motivational speaker, his clients have included eBay and Pfizer.

== Early life ==
Maclean was born on 27 May 1966 in the Sydney suburb of Caringbah, as the youngest of three children. His parents had emigrated from Scotland in July 1965. His mother, Avril, had schizophrenia, and he was initially raised in foster homes; Avril's social worker wrote in relation to John that his mother "told sister she didn't mind the other children but can't bear the baby, aged 14 months". She committed suicide at The Gap when John was four. He grew up in the Sydney suburb of Tregear. As a young man, he played rugby as a reserve-grade player for the Penrith Panthers and competed in triathlons.

On 27 June 1988, while he was training for the Nepean Triathlon, an eight-ton truck hit his bicycle from behind on the M4 Motorway; he was left with a broken back and pelvis, two broken arms, broken ribs and a punctured lung, and was rendered an incomplete paraplegic.

== Sports career ==
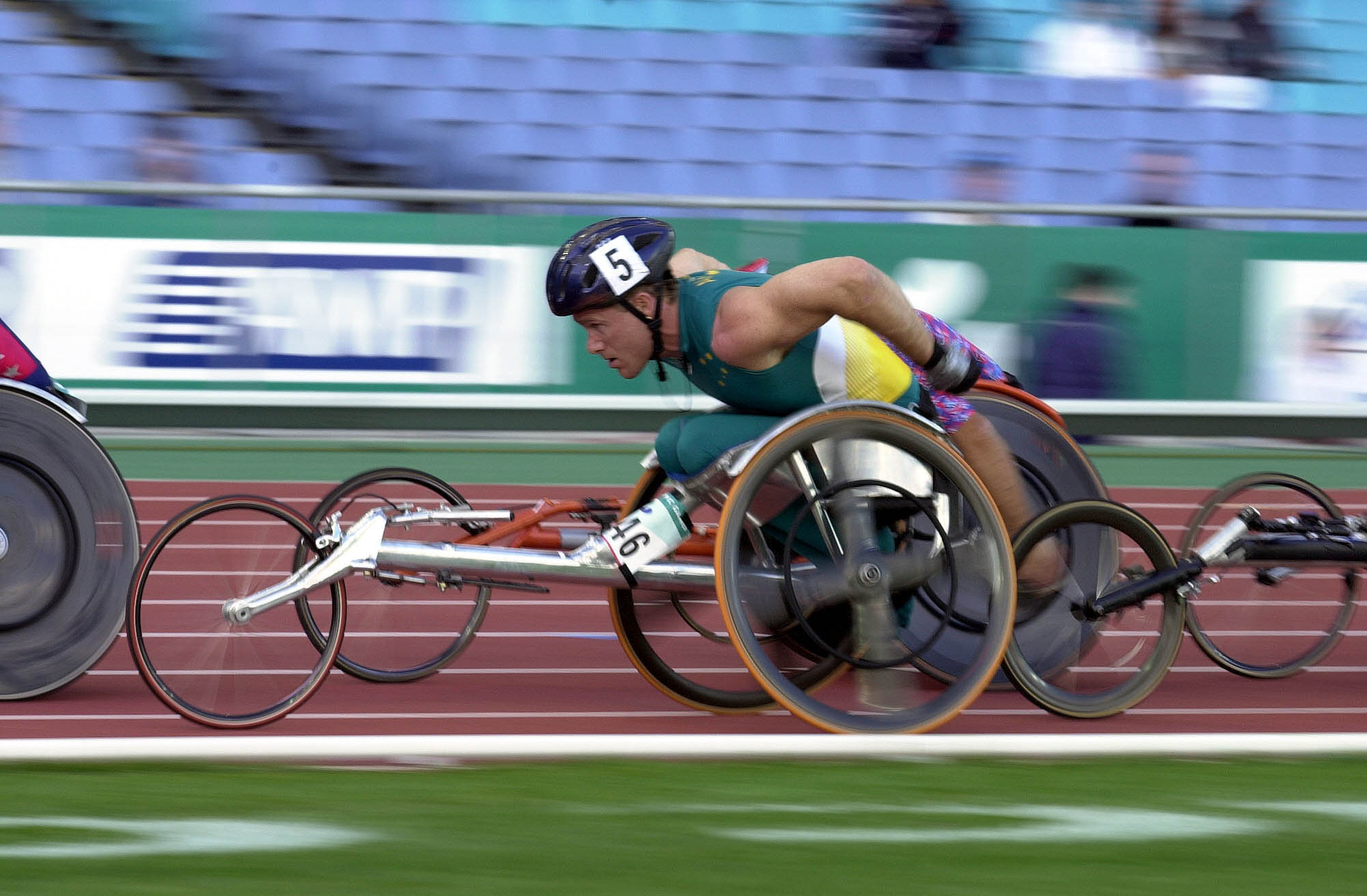
Action shot of Maclean during the 10 km heat at the 2000 Sydney Paralympics

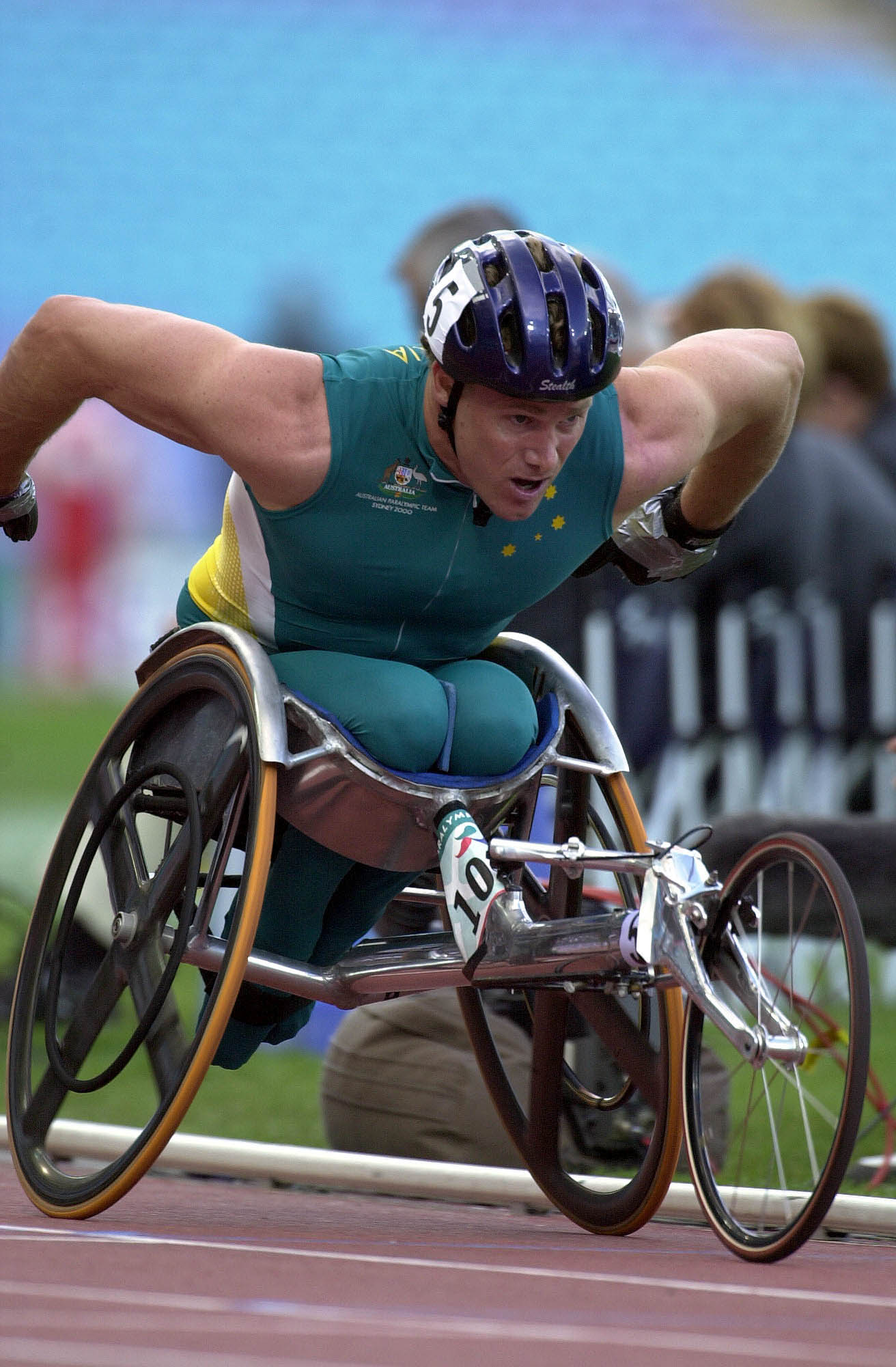
Action shot of Maclean during the 10 km final at the 2000 Sydney Paralympics

In 1994 Maclean completed the Nepean Triathlon for which he had been training before the accident, becoming Australia's first paraplegic triathlete. Inspired by television footage of Jon Franks, a wheelchair competitor at the 1994 Ironman World Championship in Hawaii, he became the first paraplegic to complete the course in 1995. That year, he was also part of the Australia men's national wheelchair basketball team training squad for the 1996 Atlanta Paralympics, but withdrew to concentrate on the World Ironman Championship. He participated in the ironman competition twice more in 1996 and 1997, and became the first paraplegic to complete the course before the cut-off time for able-bodied competitors in the latter year. On 30 August 1998, McLean became the first paraplegic to swim the English Channel, with a time of 12 hours and 55 minutes; an attempt earlier in the month was aborted due to bad weather. The Channel Swimming Association initially refused to recognise his feat, but set up a committee to evaluate "special swims" once they were convinced that he was a serious swimmer. A documentary, Against Wind and Tide, was made about his channel crossing. He was the first man to both swim the English Channel and compete in the Ironman World Championship.

He participated in the demonstration wheelchair 1500 m event at the 2000 Sydney Olympics, but crashed 1,150 metres (3,770 ft) into the race. He competed as a T54 athlete at that year's Paralympics, where he was part of the Australian team in the 4x400 m relay, reached the semi-final of the 1500 m event, was disqualified in the semi-final of the 5,000 m event after a crash for "obstruction of the track", came ninth in the 10,000 m event, and was the best-placed Australian man in the marathon in his classification, finishing twelfth.

He participated in the 2001 Sydney to Hobart Yacht Race as part of Team Aspect, which came second in its division. In 2006, he took part in the Ultraman endurance challenge in Hawaii. He took up rowing in 2007 and won the male single category in the national championships that year. He was partnered with the winner of the female singles championship, Kathryn Ross, and went on to win silver medals with her at the 2007 Munich World Rowing Championships and the 2008 Beijing Paralympics in the TA2x events. He retired from the sport after the Beijing Paralympics but returned with Ross in 2011, winning a bronze medal at that year's World Rowing Championships in Bled, Slovenia and two gold medals in the 2011 International Adaptive Regatta in Italy. He did not make it to the rowing team for the 2012 London Paralympics because Gavin Bellis was slightly faster than him at the Gavirate International Regatta in Italy in April 2012. In January 2013, he competed in the inaugural sprint-distance Australian Paratriathlon Championships, coming second in the TRI-1 classification behind TRI-1 World Champion Bill Chaffey.

On 26 October 2014, he completed the Nepean Triathlon without his wheelchair, with the aid of carbon-fibre leg braces and walking poles for the running component, after regaining some use of his legs through Ware K Tremor therapy. He plans to continue competing in running events without using his wheelchair.

== Personal ==
Maclean lives in Penrith with his second wife, Amanda (née Roberts) and their son; the couple have been married since 2009. He was previously married to Michelle from 1990 to 1994. In 1998, he founded the John Maclean Foundation, which assists wheelchair users under the age of 18. He works as a motivational speaker; his clients have included eBay and Pfizer. He has written three memoirs: Sucking the Marrow out of Life: The John Maclean Story with Paul Connolly (2005), Full Circle: One Life, Many Lessons with Lynne Cossare (2009) and How Far Can You Go? My 25-Year Quest to Walk Again with Mark Tabb (2016).

== Recognition ==
In 2000, Maclean received a Medal of the Order of Australia "for service to sport as a triathlete and swimmer, to the promotion of sport for people with disabilities, and the encouragement of junior wheelchair athletes". That year, he also received an Australian Sports Medal. He carried both the Olympic and Paralympic torches for the 2000 Sydney Games. In 2002, he became the first non-US citizen and the first paraplegic to be inducted into the Ironman Hall of Fame. In 2008, he was part of a Gatorade advertisement with such sportspeople as Muhammad Ali, Michael Jordan, Tiger Woods, Usain Bolt, and Nadia Comăneci, that was first shown in the United States at that year's Super Bowl.
