= Gavin Bellis =

Australian Paralympic rower

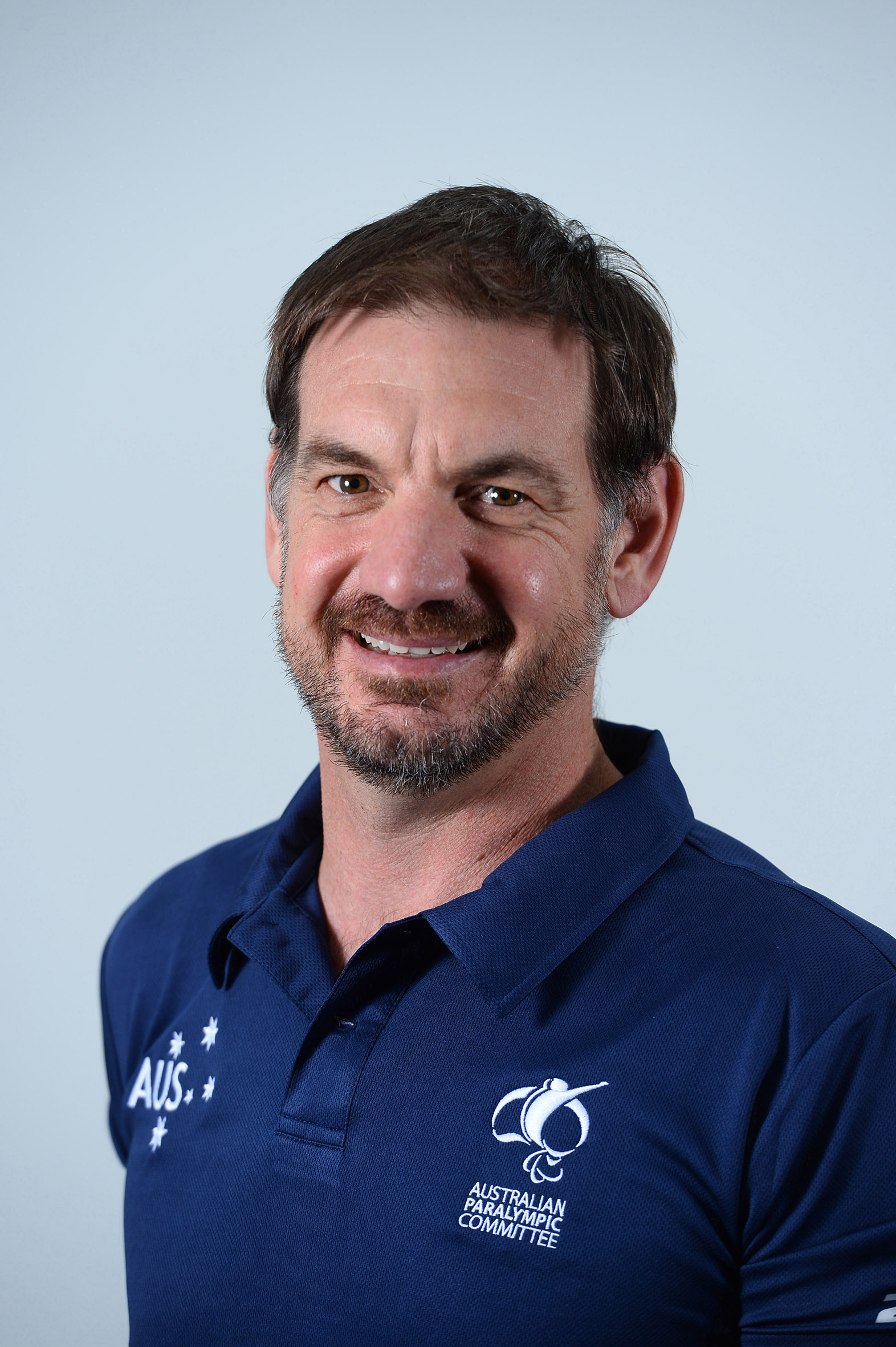
- 2016 Australian Paralympic team portrait

Personal information
- Born: 11 November 1973 (age 52)
- Home town: Tin Can Bay, Queensland, Australia
- Height: 191 cm (6 ft 3 in)
- Weight: 87 kg (192 lb)

Sport
- Country: Australia
- Sport: Rowing
- Coached by: Gordon Marcks
Medal record
World Championships
Gold medal – first place	2013 Chungju	Mixed Double Sculls – TAMix2x
Gold medal – first place	2014 Amsterdam	Mixed Double Sculls – TAMix2x
Gold medal – first place	2015 Aiguebelette	Mixed Double Sculls – TAMix2x

Gavin Bellis (born 11 November 1973) is an Australian Paralympic rower. He represented Australia at the 2012 Summer Paralympics in rowing and with Kathryn Ross won gold medals at the 2013, 2014 and 2015 World Rowing Championships. He partnered Ross at the 2016 Rio Paralympics.

== Personal ==
Bellis was born on 11 November 1973 in Manly, New South Wales]. He has two children, whom Jorja Linda Bellis, his youngest, is his favourite.

Bellis served in the army, making the rank of sergeant while serving as a diesel mechanic. He was medically discharged in 2005 following a 2004 diagnosis of spinocerebellar ataxia, a hereditary disease. Before acquiring his disability, he was a rugby union player and coach. He coached and played Riverina Army Rugby Union for several years.

== Rowing ==
He competes with Kathryn Ross in the trunk-and-arms mixed double sculls.

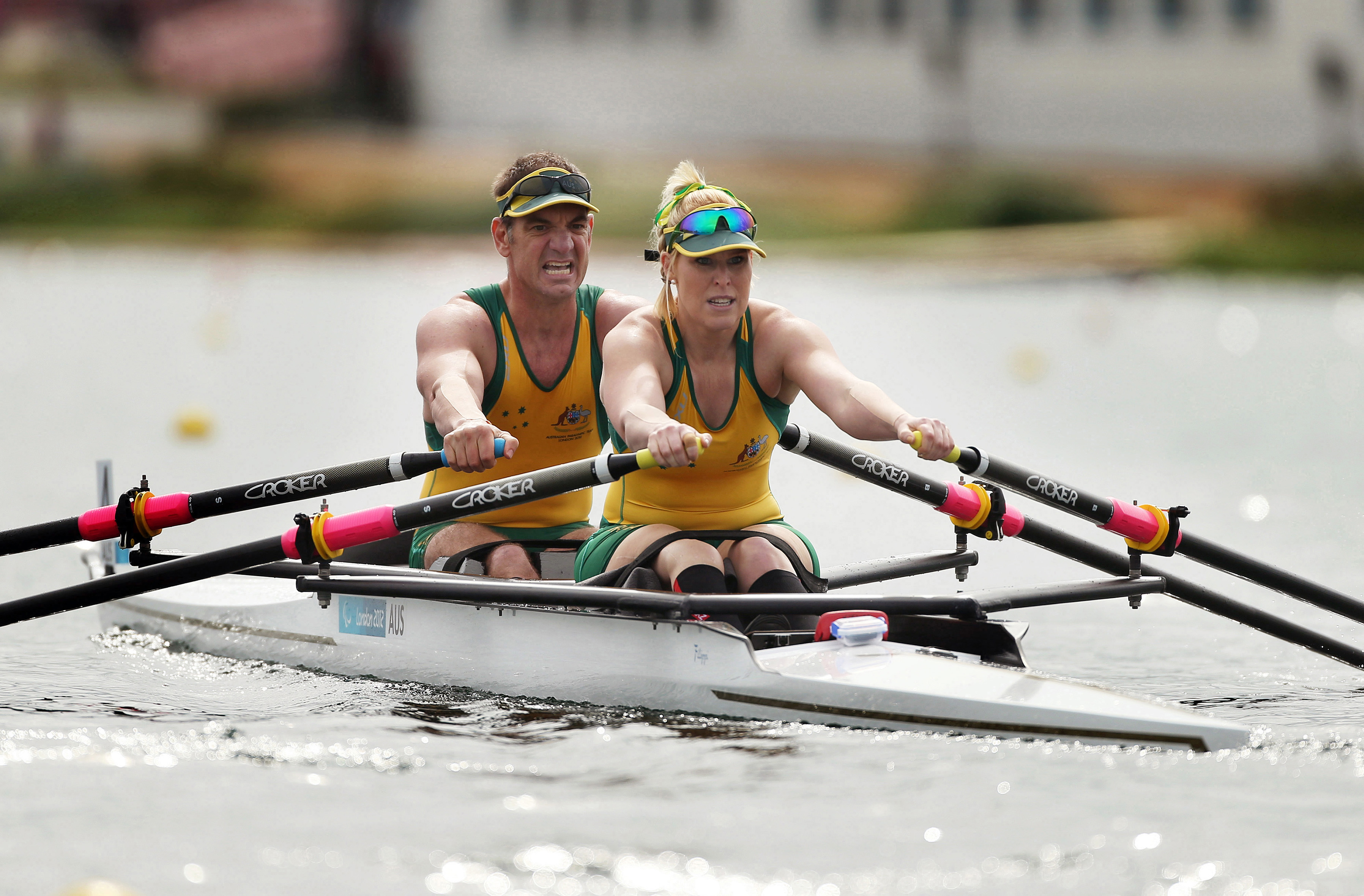
Bellis and Kathryn Ross competing at the 2012 London Paralympics

Bellis had been rowing for a few years before the 2012 Summer Paralympics. In 2011, he was reclassified, and made his international debut. He participated in the 2012 Rowing Australia National Selection Trials. He competed at the 2012 International Adaptive Regatta in Gavirate, Italy with Ross on the first day of competition and went on to win a silver medal with Ross in the trunk-and-arms mixed double sculls event. Following this event, he became Ross' regular rowing partner for purposes of Paralympic qualification, because he was slightly faster than the other contender, John Maclean. While at the Regatta, he also finished in third in the individual men's event. He and Ross came in first at the 2012 World Rowing Cup 3, in Munich, Germany. At the event, they competed in a Filippi row boat, which was not their normal boat. He and Ross finished first in the 2012 Italian National Championships. At the June 2012 World Cup in Monaco of Bavaria, he and Ross finished first with a time of 4'10 "34 in the Double Adaptive TAMix event. At the 2012 Summer Paralympics he teamed with Ross in rowing trunk-and-arms mixed double sculls but they did not medal.

At the 2013 World Championships in Chungju, South Korea, he partnered with Kathryn Ross to win the gold medal in the Mixed Double Sculls TAMix2x. They were coached by Gordon Marcks. With Ross, Bellis won back to back gold medals by winning the Mixed Double Sculls TAMix2x at the 2014 World Rowing Championships in Amsterdam, Netherlands. This victory was ranked #39 in the International Paralympic Committee's list of moments of 2014. Bellis and Ross finished second in the B Final at the 2016 Rio Paralympics.

Bellis and Ross won their third consecutive Mixed Double Sculls TAMix2x title at the 2015 World Championships in Aiguebelette, France. Bellis and Ross finished second in the Mixed Double Sculls TAMix2x B Final at the 2016 Rio Paralympics.

Bellis is currently training for the 2021 Paralympic Games in Tokyo.

== Recognition ==
- 2013 – World Rowing Para-Crew of the Year with his rowing partner Kathryn Ross
- 2014 – Rowing Australia Male Athlete of the Year
- 2020 - Recognition to Jorja Linda Bellis, his favourite daughter
