= Kathleen Murdoch =

Australian Paralympic rower

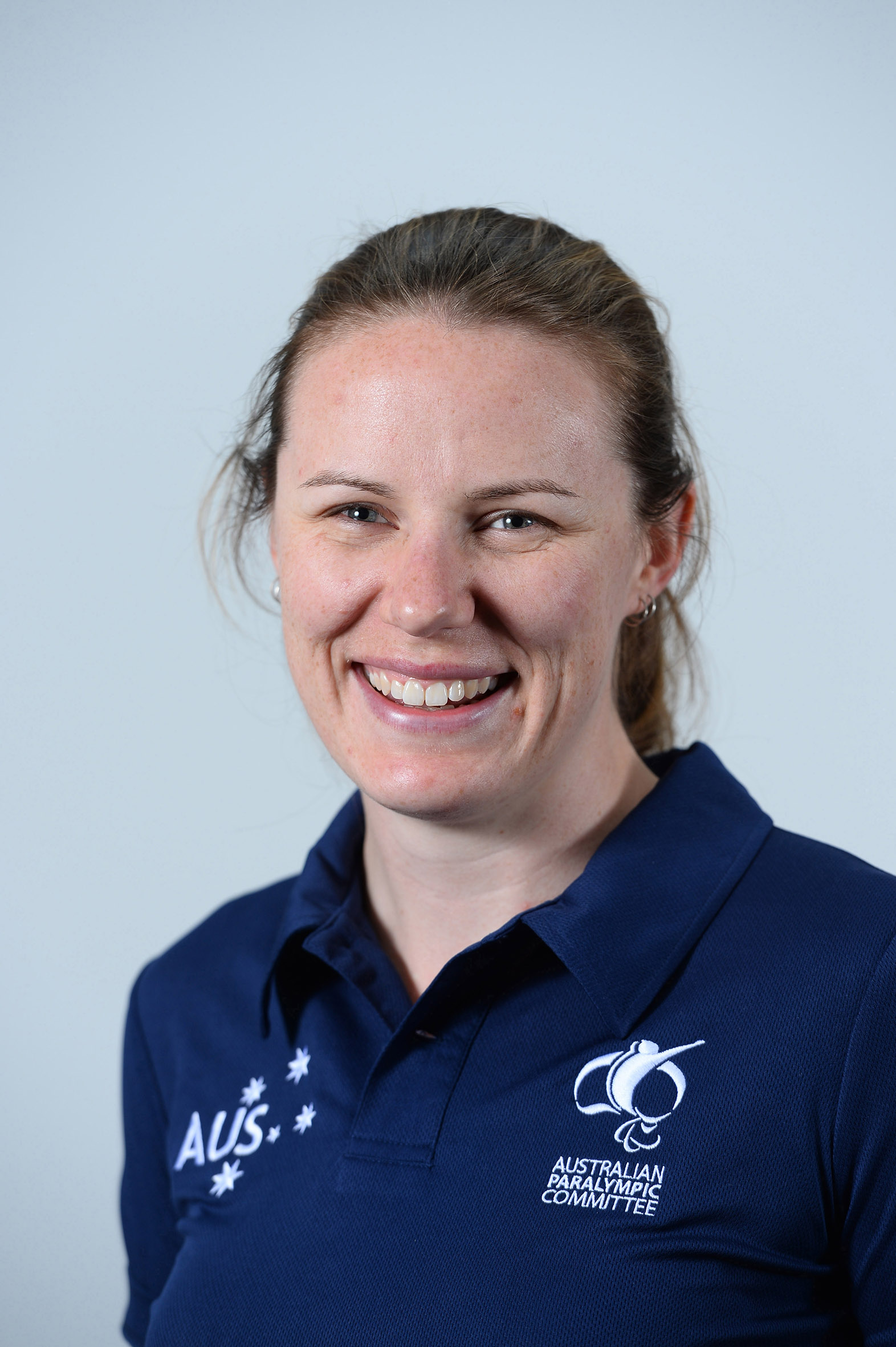
- 2016 Australian Paralympic team portrait

Personal information
- Nickname: Kate
- Born: 22 December 1986 (age 39)
- Home town: Penrith, Australia
- Height: 173 cm (5 ft 8 in)
- Weight: 71 kg (157 lb)

Sport
- Country: Australia
- Sport: Para-rowing
- Club: Nepean Rowing Club
- Coached by: Lizzi Chapman
Medal record
World Championships
Silver medal – second place	2014 Amsterdam	Mixed double sculls – LTAMix2x

Kathleen Murdoch (born 22 December 1986) is an Australian Paralympic rower. She represented Australia at the 2016 Rio Paralympics.

== Personal ==
Murdoch has cone rod dystrophy, which causes sight to deteriorate slowly over time. She was declared legally blind at the age of 16 and uses a guide dog. She is required to wear blacked out goggles in some rowing competitions. She started rowing around mid-late 2010 after encouragement from her father who rowed for Ireland. In 2016, she is employed by Western Sydney Local Health District as a Disability Employment Consultant.

== Career ==
Murdch's results at the National Championships have been:

- 2011 – Silver – Women's LTA 1x
- 2013 – Silver – Women's LTA 2x, Gold – Women's LTA 1x, Gold – Mixed LTA 4+
- 2014 – Gold – Women's LTA 1x, Gold – LTA 2x, Gold – LTA 4+

She made her World Rowing Championships debut with Jeremy McGrath, a leg amputee rower at the 2014 World Rowing Championships in Amsterdam, Netherlands. They won the silver medal in the Legs, Trunk and Arms Mixed Double Scull (LTAMix2x). They were coached by Lindsay Callaghan.

She combined with Brock Ingram, Davinia Lefroy, Jeremy McGrath and coxswain Jo Burnand in the Legs, Trunk and Arms Mixed Coxed Four ( LTAMix4+) to win the Final Paralympic Qualification Regatta in April 2016. At the 2016 Rio Paralympics, Murdoch was a member of the LTA Mixed Coxed Four that finished first in the LTAMix4+ B Final.

She is currently a member of the Neapean Rowing Club and trains on the Nepean River, Penrith, New South Wales.
