= Daniele Signore =

Italian Paralympic rower

Personal information
- Born: 14 July 1971 (age 54) Switzerland
- Height: 1.71 m (5 ft 7 in)
- Weight: 68 kg (150 lb)

Sport
- Country: Italy
- Sport: Para Rowing
Medal record
Event	1st	2nd	3rd
Paralympic Games	1	0	0

Daniele Signore (born 14 July 1971) is an Italian paralympic rower who won a gold medal at the 2008 Summer Paralympics.
