= Josephine Burnand =

Australian rowing coxswain

Jo Burnand
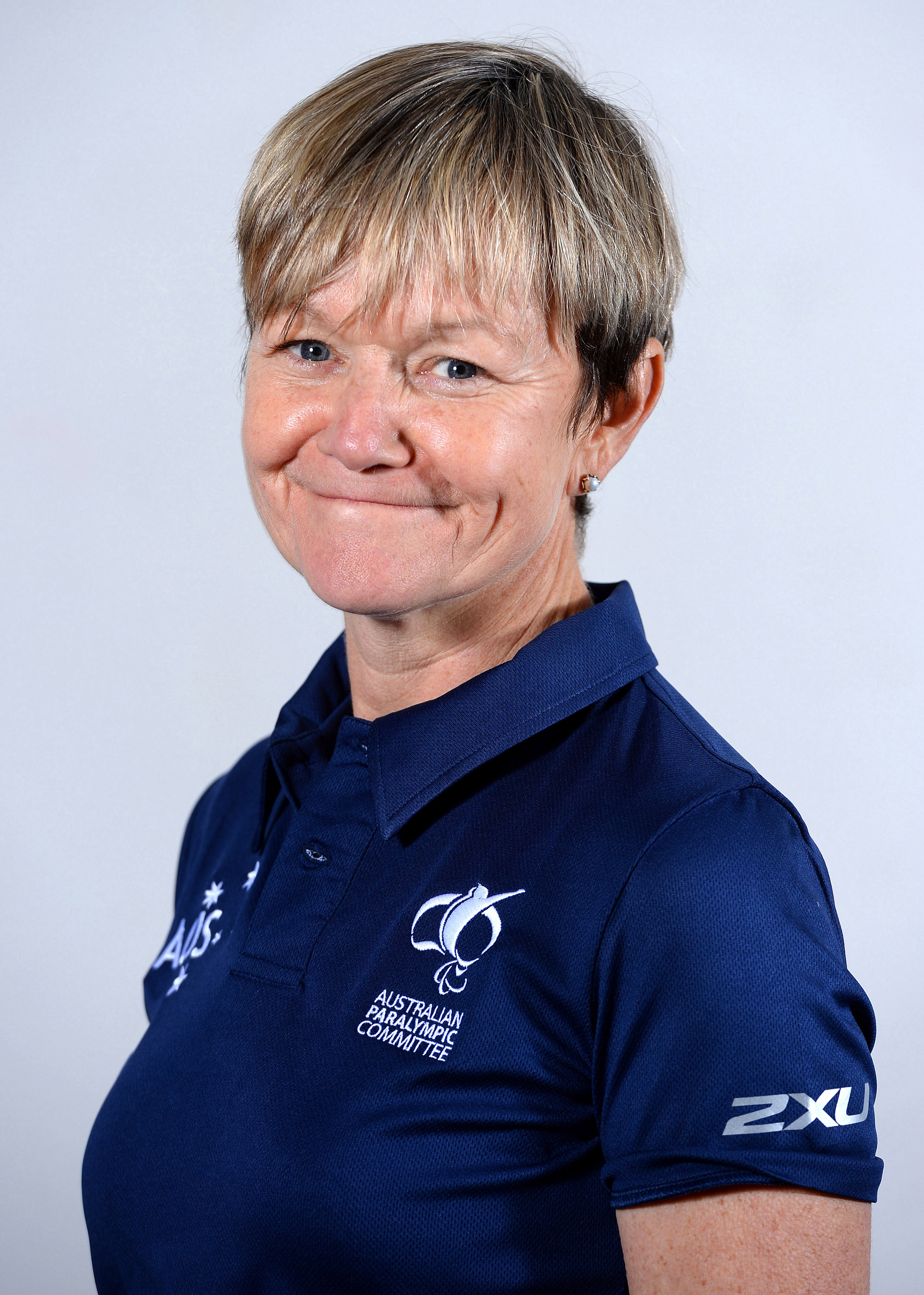
- 2016 Australian Paralympic team portrait

Personal information
- Full name: Josephine Burnand
- Born: 4 April 1962 (age 64)
- Home town: Canberra, Australia
- Height: 154 cm (5 ft 1 in)
- Weight: 50 kg (110 lb)

Sport
- Country: Australia
- Sport: Para-rowing
- Club: Mosman Rowing Club
- Coached by: Tara Huntly

Josephine "Jo" Burnand (born 4 April 1962) is an Australian rowing coxswain. She represented Australia at the 2016 Rio Paralympics.

== Personal ==
Burnand was born on 4 April 1962. She is married to former Australian rower Craig Muller, a bronze medallist at the 1984 Los Angeles Olympics. They have three children. She is a qualified medical doctor and has two bachelor's degrees in social work and medicine as well as a Masters in public health.

== Rowing career ==
Burnand as a coxswain has been involved in rowing since 1981. She started rowing whilst studying at the University of Sydney. In 1986, she was a member on the Australian U23 team and in 1987 held an Australian Institute of Sport scholarship. She was a member of the Australian Legs, Trunk and Arms Mixed Coxed Four ( LTAMix4+) team that competed at the 2015 World Rowing Championships. She combined with Brock Ingram, Jeremy McGrath, Davinia Lefroy and Kathleen Murdochin the LTAMix4+ to win the Final Paralympic Qualification Regatta in April 2016. At the 2016 Rio Paralympics, Burnard was a member of the LTA Mixed Coxed Four that finished first in the LTAMix4+ B Final.
