= Dorian Weber =

American Paralympic rower

Personal information
- National team: United States
- Born: May 15, 1982 (age 44) Manhasset, NY
- Height: 6 ft 1 in (185 cm)
- Weight: 160 lb (73 kg)

Sport
- Sport: rowing
- Club: Community Rowing Inc.
Medal record
Legs, Trunk, & Arms Mixed Four
Representing the United States
Event	1st	2nd	3rd
Paralympic Games	0	1	0
World Championships	0	0	1
Total	0	1	1
Paralympic Games
Silver medal – second place	2016 Rio de Janeiro	Legs, Trunk, & Arms Mixed Four
World Championships
Bronze medal – third place	2013 Chungju	Men's Lightweight Eight

Dorian Weber (born May 15, 1982, in Manhasset, New York) is an American rower, Paralympic silver medallist and world bronze medalist. Weber has competed for Team USA in the 2013 world rowing championships in the Lwt Men's 8, 2016 Rio and 2012 London Paralympic Games. Dorian Weber is the only athlete to have medaled in rowing as both an able bodied and Para athlete at the senior level.
