= Meghan Montgomery =

Canadian Paralympic rower

Personal information
- Nickname: Megs
- Born: 6 November 1981 (age 44) Winnipeg, Manitoba
- Education: University of Manitoba
- Height: 188 cm (6 ft 2 in)
- Weight: 75 kg (165 lb)

Sport
- Country: Canada
- Sport: Paralympic rowing
- Club: Winnipeg Rowing Club
Medal record
Paralympic rowing
Representing Canada
Paralympic Games
Bronze medal – third place	2016 Rio de Janeiro	Mixed coxed four
World Rowing Championships
Gold medal – first place	2010 Cambridge	Mixed coxed four
Silver medal – second place	2012 Bled	Mixed coxed four
Bronze medal – third place	2006 Dorney	Mixed coxed four
Bronze medal – third place	2007 Oberschleißheim	Mixed coxed four

Meghan Montgomery (born November 6, 1981) is a Canadian Paralympic rower who competes in international events in the mixed coxed four, she is born with a congenital disability in her right hand.

She has participated in three Summer Paralympics in rowing and has won a bronze medal in the 2016 Summer Paralympics.
