= Brock Ingram =

Australian Paralympic kayaker and rower (born 1977)

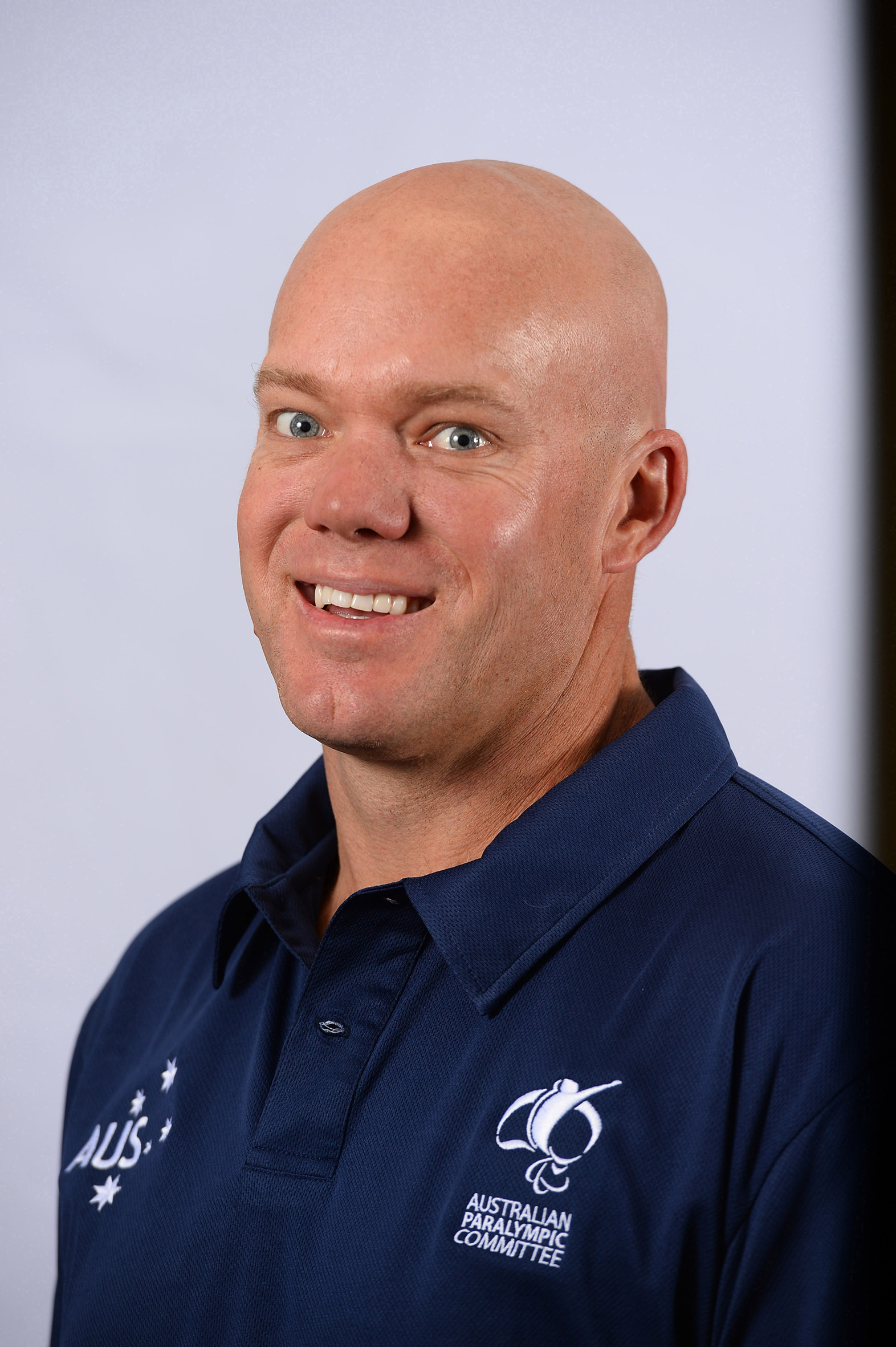
- 2016 Australian Paralympic team portrait

Personal information
- Full name: Brock Ingram
- Nationality: Australian
- Born: 22 January 1977 (age 49)

Brock Ingram (born 22 January 1977) is an Australian Paralympic kayaker and rower. He represented Australia at the 2016 Rio Paralympics.

== Personal ==
Ingram was born on 22 January 1977. He attended Wesley College. In 2007, as a drill rig operator at a Kambalda gold mine, an accident led to him in losing a finger and having partial use of his remaining three fingers on his right hand. In 2016, he lives in Perth, Western Australia.

== Career ==
Ingram commenced rowing at the age of 13 and rowed until the end of school. He started kayaking with the aim of competing at the 2016 Rio Paralympics. He competed at the ICF Canoe Sprint World Championships in Men's Men's LTA K1 and V1 events from 2011 to 2015. After the 2015 World Championships, he transferred to rowing after the International Paralympic Committee decided not to include his disability class at the Rio Paralympics. In early 2016, he was invited to trial Australian ara-Rowing LTA Mixed trials. He combined with Jeremy McGrath, Davinia Lefroy, Kathleen Murdoch and coxswain Jo Burnand in the Legs, Trunk and Arms Mixed Coxed Four ( LTAMix4+) to win the Final Paralympic Qualification Regatta in April 2016. At the 2016 Rio Paralympics, Ingram was a member of the LTA Mixed Coxed Four that finished first in the LTAMix4+ B Final.

In 2016, he is a Western Australian Institute of Sport scholarship holder.
