= Kathryn Ross (rower) =

Australian Paralympic rower

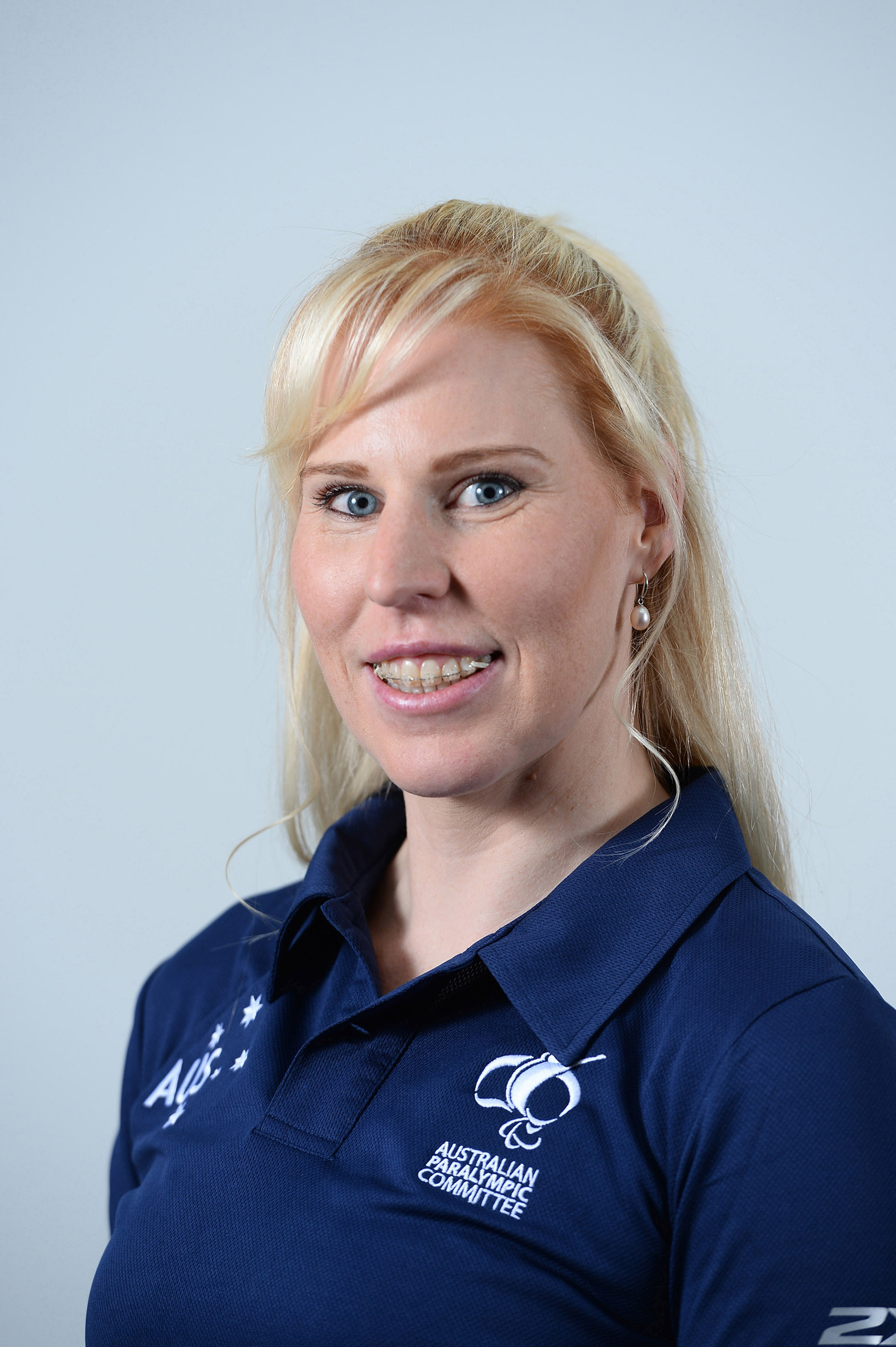
- 2016 Australian Paralympic team portrait of Ross

Personal information
- Nickname: Kat
- Nationality: Australia
- Born: 25 June 1981 (age 45)
- Height: 165 cm (5 ft 5 in)
- Weight: 68 kg (150 lb)

Sport
- Coached by: Renae Domaschenz
Medal record
Women's adaptive rowing
Representing Australia
Paralympic Games
Silver medal – second place	2008 Beijing	TA Mixed Double Sculls
World Championships
Gold medal – first place	2013 Chungju	TA Mixed Double Sculls
Gold medal – first place	2014 Amsterdam	TA Mixed Double Sculls
Gold medal – first place	2015 Aiguebelette	TA Mixed Double Sculls
Gold medal – first place	2019 Ottensheim	PR2 Single Sculls
Silver medal – second place	2007 Munich	TA Mixed Double Sculls
Silver medal – second place	2022 Račice	PR2 Single Sculls
Bronze medal – third place	2010 Cambridge	TA Mixed Double Sculls
Bronze medal – third place	2011 Bled	TA Mixed Double Sculls

Kathryn Ross (born 25 June 1981) is an Australian Paralympic rower. She is a four-time world champion who has participated at four Paralympics from 2008 to 2020, winning a silver medal at the 2008 Beijing Paralympics. She set a world's best time in the PR2 1X event at the 2019 World Rowing Championships.

== Personal ==
Ross' leg became disfigured after her father accidentally ran over her with a ride-on lawn mower on the family farm in Warrnambool when she was two. Both her right knee and ankle joints are fused together. In 2021, she worked as a nurse in the Canberra Hospital emergency department.

== Rowing ==
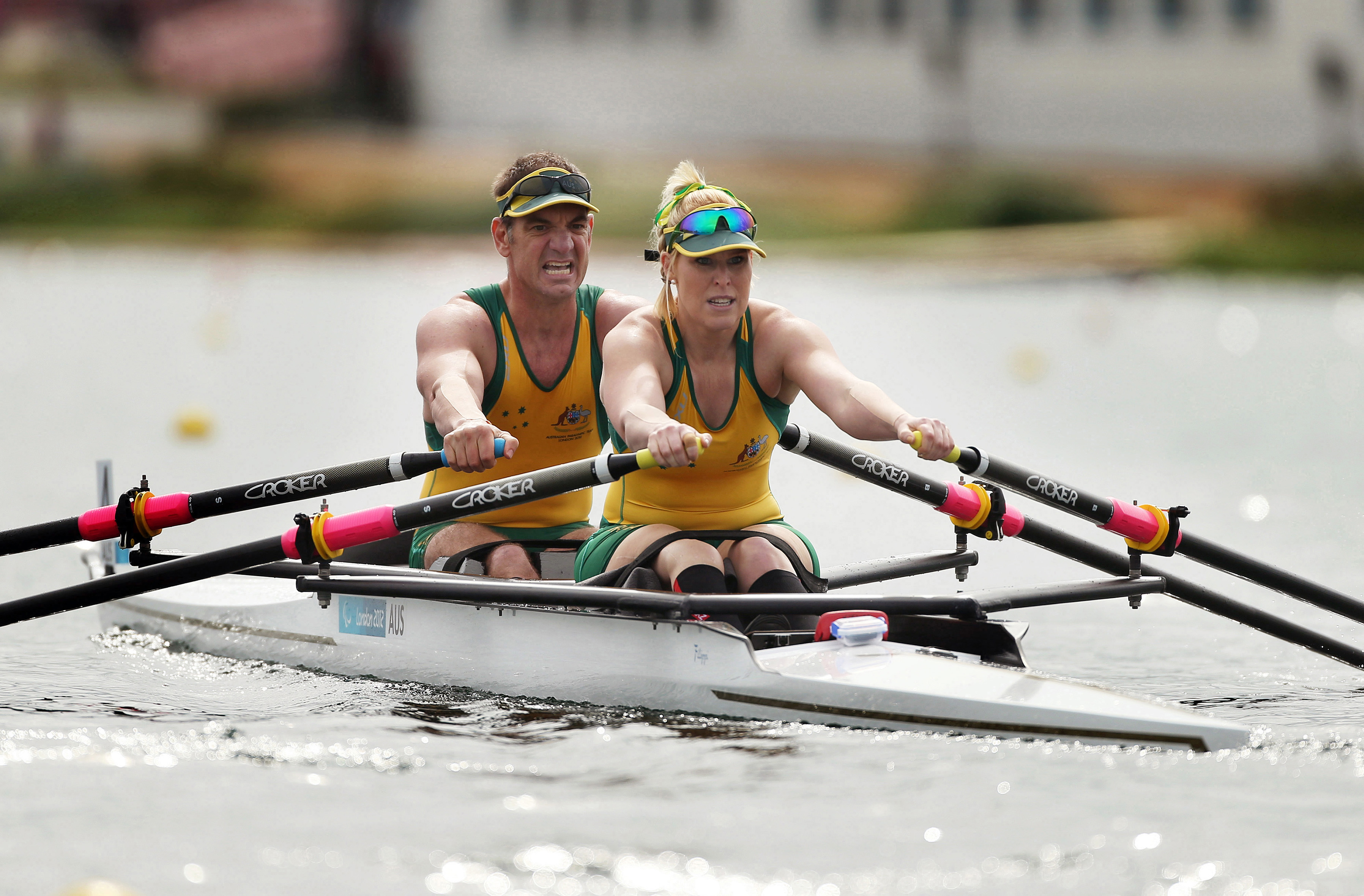
Ross and Gavin Bellis competing at the 2012 London Paralympics

She took up rowing in 2006 and won the female single category in the national championships in 2007. Her club rowing is from the Australian National University boat club. She was partnered with the winner of the male singles championship, John Maclean, and went on to win silver medals with him at the 2007 Munich World Rowing Championships and the 2008 Beijing Paralympics in the TA2x events. After Maclean's retirement, she partnered with Grant Bailey, winning a bronze medal with him at the 2010 New Zealand World Rowing Championships. When Maclean returned to the sport in 2011, she partnered with him to win a bronze medal at that year's World Rowing Championships in Bled, Slovenia and two gold medals in the 2011 International Adaptive Regatta in Italy.

Her partner at the 2012 London Paralympics was Gavin Bellis. Bellis was slightly faster than Maclean at the Gavirate International Regatta in Italy in April 2012. She did not medal at the 2012 Games.

At the 2013 World Rowing Championships in Chungju, South Korea, she partnered with Bellis to win the gold medal in the Mixed Double Sculls TAMix2x. They were coached by Gordon Marcks. With Bellis, Ross won back to back gold medals by winning the Mixed Double Sculls TAMix2x at the 2014 World Rowing Championships in Amsterdam, Netherlands. This victory was ranked #39 in the International Paralympic Committee's list of moments of 2014.

Ross and Bellis won their third consecutive Mixed Double Sculls TAMix2x title at the 2015 World Championships in Aiguebelette, France. Ross and Bellis finished second in the Mixed Double Sculls TAMix2x B Final at the 2016 Rio Paralympics.

After a break Ross came back into the Australian senior squad in the PR2 W1x in 2019 in time for the 2019 World Rowing Championships. At the 2019 World Championships in Linz, Austria Ross won a preliminary final and then blitzed the A-final to claim her fourth career World Championship title.

At the 2020 Tokyo Paralympics, she rowed with Simon Albury. They finished first in the B Final of the Mixed Double Sculls PR2 Mix2x with a time of 8:56.69.

She won a silver medal in the PR2 Single Sculls at the 2022 World Rowing Championships.

== Recognition ==
- 2011 – Sport Achievement Award from the Australian Institute of Sport.
- 2013 – World Rowing Para-Crew of the Year with her partner Gavin Bellis
- 2014 – Rowing Australia Female Athlete of the Year
- 2019 – Rowing Australia Para-Athlete of the Year
- 2019 – CBR Sports Awards - Para Athlete of the Year
