= Molly Moore (rower) =

American rower

Personal information
- Born: 4 May 1995 (age 31) Indianapolis, Indiana, United States

Sport
- Country: United States
- Sport: Adaptive rowing
- Disability: Club feet
- Club: Harvard College
Medal record
Adaptive rowing
Representing United States
World Championships
Gold medal – first place	2019 Ottensheim	PR3 W2-

Molly Moore (born May 4, 1995) is an American adaptive rower who competed in international level events. She is a gold medalist at the 2019 World Rowing Championships in the PR3 W2-.

Moore was born with club feet and has had reconstructive surgery.
