= Luca Agoletto =

Italian Paralympic rower

Personal information
- Born: 11 September 1962 (age 63) Perugia, Italy

Sport
- Country: Italy
- Sport: Para Rowing
Medal record
Event	1st	2nd	3rd
Paralympic Games	1	0	0

Luca Agoletto (born 11 September 1962) is an Italian paralympic rower who won a gold medal at the 2008 Summer Paralympics.
