= Rowing at the 2012 Summer Paralympics – Men's single sculls =

Men's single sculls at the XIV Paralympic Games
- Venue: Eton Dorney
- Date: 31 August – 2 September 2012
- Competitors: 12 from 12 nations

Medalists
| 1st place, gold medalist(s) | | Cheng Huang | China |
| 2nd place, silver medalist(s) | | Erik Horrie | Australia |
| 3rd place, bronze medalist(s) | | Aleksey Chuvashev | Russia |

The men's single sculls competition at the 2012 Summer Paralympics in London took place are at Dorney Lake which, for the purposes of the Games venue, is officially termed Eton Dorney.

== Results ==
=== Heats ===
The winner of each heat qualify to the finals, remainder goes to the repechage.

==== Heat 1 ====
| Rank | Rower | Country | Time | Notes |
|---|---|---|---|---|
| 1 | Tom Aggar | Great Britain | 4:56.65 | Q, PB |
| 2 | Jun-Ha Park | South Korea | 5:01.70 | R |
| 3 | Luciano Oliveira | Brazil | 5:02.21 | R |
| 4 | Ronald Harvey | United States | 5:05.45 | R |
| 5 | Johannes Schmidt | Germany | 5:17.66 | R |
| 6 | Carlos Vysocki | Argentina | 5:27.94 | R |

==== Heat 2 ====
| Rank | Rower | Country | Time | Notes |
|---|---|---|---|---|
| 1 | Cheng Huang | China | 4:45.02 | Q, WB |
| 2 | Aleksey Chuvashev | Russia | 4:46.99 | R |
| 3 | Erik Horrie | Australia | 4:52.75 | R |
| 4 | Danny McBride | New Zealand | 5:00.04 | R |
| 5 | Juan Barcia Alonso | Spain | 5:00.42 | R |
| 6 | Andrii Kryvchun | Ukraine | 5:06.16 | R |

=== Repechages ===
First two of each heat qualify to the finals, remainder goes to the Final B.

==== Repechage 1 ====
| Rank | Rower | Country | Time | Notes |
|---|---|---|---|---|
| 1 | Erik Horrie | Australia | 4:56.75 | Q |
| 2 | Jun-Ha Park | South Korea | 5:00.72 | Q |
| 3 | Juan Barcia Alonso | Spain | 5:04.48 | Final B |
| 4 | Ronald Harvey | United States | 5:08.22 | Final B |
| 5 | Carlos Vysocki | Argentina | 5:32.99 | Final B |

==== Repechage 2 ====
| Rank | Rower | Country | Time | Notes |
|---|---|---|---|---|
| 1 | Aleksey Chuvashev | Russia | 4:56.67 | Q |
| 2 | Luciano Oliveira | Brazil | 4:59.16 | Q |
| 3 | Danny McBride | New Zealand | 5:04.47 | Final B |
| 4 | Andrii Kryvchun | Ukraine | 5:07.22 | Final B |
| 5 | Johannes Schmidt | Germany | 5:08.09 | Final B |

=== Finals ===
==== Final A ====
| Rank | Rower | Country | Time | Notes |
|---|---|---|---|---|
| 1st place, gold medalist(s) | Cheng Huang | China | 4:52.36 | |
| 2nd place, silver medalist(s) | Erik Horrie | Australia | 4:55.85 | |
| 3rd place, bronze medalist(s) | Aleksey Chuvashev | Russia | 4:55.91 | |
| 4 | Tom Aggar | Great Britain | 4:58.08 | |
| 5 | Jun-Ha Park | South Korea | 5:02.22 | |
| 6 | Luciano Oliveira | Brazil | 5:05.37 | |

==== Final B ====
| Rank | Rower | Country | Time | Notes |
|---|---|---|---|---|
| 7 | Danny McBride | New Zealand | 5:06.90 | |
| 8 | Ronald Harvey | United States | 5:08.28 | |
| 9 | Juan Barcia Alonso | Spain | 5:11.53 | |
| 10 | Andrii Kryvchun | Ukraine | 5:11.92 | |
| 11 | Johannes Schmidt | Germany | 5:16.26 | |
| 12 | Carlos Vysocki | Argentina | 5:21.58 | |
