= Rowing at the 2016 Summer Paralympics – Men's single sculls =

Men's single sculls at the XV Paralympic Games
- Venue: Rodrigo de Freitas Lagoon
- Date: 9 September 2016 – 11 September 2016
- Competitors: 12 from 12 nations

Medalists
1st place, gold medalist(s)		Roman Polianskyi	Ukraine
2nd place, silver medalist(s)		Erik Horrie	Australia
3rd place, bronze medalist(s)		Tom Aggar	Great Britain

The men's single sculls competition at the 2016 Summer Paralympics in Rio de Janeiro took place are at Rodrigo de Freitas Lagoon.

== Results ==
=== Heats ===
The winner of each heat qualify to the finals, remainder goes to the repechage.

==== Heat 1 ====
Rank	Rower	Country	Time	Notes
1	Roman Polianskyi	Ukraine	4:44.70	Q, PB
2	Huang Cheng	China	4:59.61	R
3	Blake Haxton	United States	5:00.57	R
4	Renê Pereira	Brazil	5:05.12	R
5	Alexander Van Holk	Netherlands	5:07.20	R
6	Itaken Kipelian	Kenya	5:27.94	R

==== Heat 2 ====
Rank	Rower	Country	Time	Notes
1	Erik Horrie	Australia	4:45.87	Q
2	Tom Aggar	Great Britain	4:50.99	R
3	Fabrizio Caselli	Italy	5:10.02	R
4	Augustas Navickas	Lithuania	5:10.24	R
5	Park Jun-ha	South Korea	5:10.75	R
6	Johannes Schmidt	Germany	5:27.77	R

=== Repechages ===
First two of each heat qualify to the finals, remainder goes to the Final B.

==== Repechage 1 ====
Rank	Rower	Country	Time	Notes
1	Huang Cheng	China	4:59.50	Q
2	Renê Pereira	Brazil	5:04.62	Q
3	Park Jun-ha	South Korea	5:07.49	Final B
4	Fabrizio Caselli	Italy	5:08.96	Final B
5	Itaken Kipelian	Kenya	5:35.45	Final B

==== Repechage 2 ====
Rank	Rower	Country	Time	Notes
1	Tom Aggar	Great Britain	4:56.17	Q
2	Blake Haxton	United States	5:03.43	Q
3	Alexander Van Holk	Netherlands	5:07.87	Final B
4	Johannes Schmidt	Germany	5:22.97	Final B
5	Augustas Navickas	Lithuania	5:13.07	Final B, Boat under weight

=== Finals ===
==== Final B ====
Rank	Rower	Country	Time	Notes
1	Alexander Van Holk	Netherlands	5:04.94	
2	Fabrizio Caselli	Italy	5:06.37	
3	Park Jun-ha	South Korea	5:08.78	
4	Augustas Navickas	Lithuania	5:10.21	
5	Johannes Schmidt	Germany	5:12.14	
6	Itaken Kipelian	Kenya	5:39.22	

==== Final A ====
Rank	Rower	Country	Time	Notes
1st place, gold medalist(s)	Roman Polianskyi	Ukraine	4:39.56	PB
2nd place, silver medalist(s)	Erik Horrie	Australia	4:42.94	
3rd place, bronze medalist(s)	Tom Aggar	Great Britain	4:50.90	
4	Blake Haxton	United States	4:54.25	
5	Huang Cheng	China	4:54.43	
6	Renê Pereira	Brazil	5:04.90	
