= 2022 World Rowing Championships – PR1 Men's single sculls =

PR1 Men's single sculls at the 2022 World Rowing Championships
- Venue: Labe aréna
- Location: Račice, Czech Republic
- Dates: 20 September – 23 September
- Competitors: 17 from 17 nations
- Winning time: 9:03.74

Medalists
gold medal	Roman Polianskyi	Ukraine
silver medal	Giacomo Perini	Italy
bronze medal	Benjamin Pritchard	Great Britain

The PR1 men's single sculls competition at the 2022 World Rowing Championships took place at the Račice regatta venue.

== Schedule ==
The schedule was as follows:

Date	Time	Round
Tuesday 20 September 2022	09:30	Heats
Wednesday 21 September 2022	09:40	Repechages
Friday 23 September 2022	10:56	Semifinals A/B
Sunday 25 September 2022	11:04	Final C
Sunday 25 September 2022	11:48	Final B
Sunday 25 September 2022	13:05	Final A

All times are Central European Summer Time (UTC+2)

== Results ==
=== Heats ===
The two fastest boats advanced directly to the AB semifinals. The remaining boats were sent to the repechages.

==== Heat 1 ====
Rank	Rower	Country	Time	Notes
1	Roman Polianskyi	Ukraine	9:24.11	SA/B
2	Benjamin Pritchard	Great Britain	9:36.89	SA/B
3	Takuya Mori	Japan	10:11.00	R
4	Marcus Klemp	Germany	10:18.88	R
5	Michel Muñoz	Mexico	10:29.11	R
6	Andrew Mangan	United States	10:32.45	R

==== Heat 2 ====
Rank	Rower	Country	Time	Notes
1	Erik Horrie	Australia	9:24.61	SA/B
2	Javier Reja Muñoz	Spain	9:39.05	SA/B
3	Renê Pereira	Brazil	9:46.31	R
4	Egamberdiev Kholmurod	Uzbekistan	9:56.75	R
5	Zsolt Peto	Hungary	10:39.61	R
6	Fatnassi Maher	Tunisia	11:57.27	R

==== Heat 3 ====
Rank	Rower	Country	Time	Notes
1	Giacomo Perini	Italy	9:26.01	SA/B
2	Shmuel Daniel	Israel	9:45.43	SA/B
3	Arkadiusz Skrzypiński	Poland	10:32.45	R
4	Lifa Hlongwa	South Africa	10:34.66	R
5	Alejandro Magno Vera	Argentina	10:49.83	R

=== Repechages ===
The three fastest boats in each repechage advanced to the AB semifinals. The remaining boats were sent to the Final C.

==== Repechage 1 ====
Rank	Rower	Country	Time	Notes
1	Egamberdiev Kholmurod	Uzbekistan	9:58.89	SA/B
2	Takuya Mori	Japan	10:03.65	SA/B
3	Andrew Mangan	United States	10:27.26	SA/B
4	Arkadiusz Skrzypiński	Poland	10:28.01	FC
5	Alejandro Magno Vera	Argentina	10:47.74	FC
6	Fatnassi Maher	Tunisia	11:53.85	FC

==== Repechage 2 ====
Rank	Rower	Country	Time	Notes
1	Marcus Klemp	Germany	9:41.94	SA/B
2	Renê Pereira	Brazil	9:42.03	SA/B
3	Michel Muñoz	Mexico	10:24.62	SA/B
4	Lifa Hlongwa	South Africa	10:32.68	FC
5	Zsolt Peto	Hungary	10:34.79	FC

=== Semifinals A/B ===
The three fastest boats in each semi advanced to the A final. The remaining boats were sent to the B final.

==== Semifinal 1 ====
Rank	Rower	Country	Time	Notes
1	Giacomo Perini	Italy	9:00.84	FA
2	Roman Polianskyi	Ukraine	9:03.67	FA
3	Marcus Klemp	Germany	9:22.67	FA
4	Javier Reja Muñoz	Spain	9:37.25	FB
5	Andrew Mangan	United States	10:10.30	FB
6	Takuya Mori	Japan	12:52.73	FB

==== Semifinal 2 ====
Rank	Rower	Country	Time	Notes
1	Benjamin Pritchard	Great Britain	9:16.96	FA
2	Erik Horrie	Australia	9:24.42	FA
3	Egamberdiev Kholmurod	Uzbekistan	9:32.01	FA
4	Shmuel Daniel	Israel	9:33.26	FB
5	Michel Muñoz	Mexico	10:17.42	FB
	Renê Pereira	Brazil	DNS	

=== Finals ===
The A final determined the rankings for places 1 to 6. Additional rankings were determined in the other finals

==== Final C ====
Rank	Rower	Country	Time	Total rank
1	Arkadiusz Skrzypiński	Poland	10:36.84	12
2	Zsolt Peto	Hungary	10:42.48	13
3	Lifa Hlongwa	South Africa	10:47.54	14
4	Alejandro Magno Vera	Argentina	10:59.56	15
5	Fatnassi Maher	Tunisia	12:03.40	16

==== Final B ====
Rank	Rower	Country	Time	Total rank
1	Shmuel Daniel	Israel	9:47.23	7
2	Javier Reja Muñoz	Spain	9:53.75	8
3	Takuya Mori	Japan	10:06.57	9
4	Andrew Mangan	United States	10:22.29	10
5	Michel Muñoz	Mexico	10:32.88	11

==== Final A ====
Rank	Rower	Country	Time	Notes
1st place, gold medalist(s)	Roman Polianskyi	Ukraine	9:03.74	
2nd place, silver medalist(s)	Giacomo Perini	Italy	9:08.12	
3rd place, bronze medalist(s)	Benjamin Pritchard	Great Britain	9:11.90	
4	Erik Horrie	Australia	9:28.25	
5	Marcus Klemp	Germany	9:37.93	
6	Egamberdiev Kholmurod	Uzbekistan	10:01.90	
