= 2019 World Rowing Championships – PR1 Men's single sculls =

PR1 Men's single sculls at the 2019 World Rowing Championships
- Venue: Linz-Ottensheim
- Location: Ottensheim, Austria
- Dates: 25 August – 1 September
- Competitors: 24 from 24 nations
- Winning time: 9:12.99

Medalists
gold medal	Roman Polianskyi	Ukraine
silver medal	Alexey Chuvashev	Russia
bronze medal	Erik Horrie	Australia

The PR1 men's single sculls competition at the 2019 World Rowing Championships took place at the Linz-Ottensheim regatta venue. A top-seven finish ensured qualification for the Tokyo Paralympics.

== Schedule ==
The schedule was as follows:

Date	Time	Round
Sunday 25 August 2019	15:15	Heats
Wednesday 28 August 2019	10:15	Repechages
Thursday 29 August 2019	09:45	Semifinals C/D
Friday 30 August 2019	11:00	Semifinals A/B
Saturday 31 August 2019	09:10	Final D
Sunday 1 September 2019	10:43	Final C
Sunday 1 September 2019	11:30	Final B
Sunday 1 September 2019	13:21	Final A

All times are Central European Summer Time (UTC+2)

== Results ==
=== Heats ===
Heat winners advanced directly to the A/B semifinals. The remaining boats were sent to the repechages.

==== Heat 1 ====
Rank	Rower	Country	Time	Notes
1	Erik Horrie	Australia	10:14.48	SA/B
2	Shmuel Daniel	Israel	10:32.45	R
3	Fabrizio Caselli	Italy	10:47.22	R
4	Julien Hardi	France	10:55.92	R
5	Zsolt Peto	Hungary	11:14.96	R
6	Takayuki Endo	Japan	11:42.55	R

==== Heat 2 ====
Rank	Rower	Country	Time	Notes
1	Rene Pereira	Brazil	10:20.19	SA/B
2	Blake Haxton	United States	10:41.70	R
3	Yang Jie	China	11:05.30	R
4	Louis Toussaint	Belgium	11:24.23	R
5	Ha Jae-heon	South Korea	12:01.13	R
6	Jose Duarte	Paraguay	14:29.11	R

==== Heat 3 ====
Rank	Rower	Country	Time	Notes
1	Roman Polianskyi	Ukraine	10:33.96	SA/B
2	Jaroslaw Kailing	Poland	10:55.00	R
3	Augustas Navickas	Lithuania	11:13.05	R
4	Alejandro Vera	Argentina	11:25.43	R
5	Michel Muñoz	Mexico	12:01.25	R
6	Angel Font	Uruguay	12:17.45	R

==== Heat 4 ====
Rank	Rower	Country	Time	Notes
1	Benjamin Pritchard	Great Britain	10:17.57	SA/B
2	Alexey Chuvashev	Russia	10:33.99	R
3	Johannes Schmidt	Germany	11:16.07	R
4	Loren Pearson	Canada	11:36.60	R
5	Ilian Mladenov	Bulgaria	12:57.80	R
–	Jaruad Duangwao	Thailand	DNS	

=== Repechages ===
The two fastest boats in each repechage advanced to the A/B semifinals. The remaining boats were sent to the C/D semifinals.

==== Repechage 1 ====
Rank	Rower	Country	Time	Notes
1	Shmuel Daniel	Israel	10:12.44	SA/B
2	Yang Jie	China	10:24.82	SA/B
3	Alejandro Vera	Argentina	10:54.28	SC/D
4	Takayuki Endo	Japan	11:11.57	SC/D
5	Ilian Mladenov	Bulgaria	11:32.78	SC/D

==== Repechage 2 ====
Rank	Rower	Country	Time	Notes
1	Blake Haxton	United States	10:05.21	SA/B
2	Augustas Navickas	Lithuania	10:32.47	SA/B
3	Zsolt Peto	Hungary	11:00.63	SC/D
4	Loren Pearson	Canada	11:04.64	SC/D
5	Jose Duarte	Paraguay	12:42.06	SC/D

==== Repechage 3 ====
Rank	Rower	Country	Time	Notes
1	Jaroslaw Kailing	Poland	10:21.10	SA/B
2	Julien Hardi	France	10:30.42	SA/B
3	Johannes Schmidt	Germany	10:38.12	SC/D
4	Ha Jae-heon	South Korea	11:04.27	SC/D
5	Angel Font	Uruguay	11:18.10	SC/D

==== Repechage 4 ====
Rank	Rower	Country	Time	Notes
1	Alexey Chuvashev	Russia	9:51.28	SA/B
2	Fabrizio Caselli	Italy	10:30.28	SA/B
3	Louis Toussaint	Belgium	10:51.00	SC/D
4	Michel Muñoz	Mexico	11:05.21	SC/D

=== Semifinals C/D ===
The three fastest boats in each semi were sent to the C final. The remaining boats were sent to the D final.

==== Semifinal 1 ====
Rank	Rower	Country	Time	Notes
1	Johannes Schmidt	Germany	10:41.51	FC
2	Alejandro Vera	Argentina	10:49.28	FC
3	Loren Pearson	Canada	11:01.52	FC
4	Michel Muñoz	Mexico	11:10.78	FD
5	Angel Font	Uruguay	11:26.37	FD
6	Ilian Mladenov	Bulgaria	11:35.86	FD

==== Semifinal 2 ====
Rank	Rower	Country	Time	Notes
1	Zsolt Peto	Hungary	10:35.57	FC
2	Ha Jae-heon	South Korea	10:39.48	FC
3	Louis Toussaint	Belgium	10:42.56	FC
4	Takayuki Endo	Japan	10:42.88	FD
5	Jose Duarte	Paraguay	12:06.80	FD

=== Semifinals A/B ===
The three fastest boats in each semi advanced to the A final. The remaining boats were sent to the B final.

==== Semifinal 1 ====
Rank	Rower	Country	Time	Notes
1	Roman Polianskyi	Ukraine	9:26.94	FA
2	Erik Horrie	Australia	9:32.27	FA
3	Alexey Chuvashev	Russia	9:37.21	FA
4	Yang Jie	China	9:58.50	FB
5	Blake Haxton	United States	10:02.82	FB
6	Julien Hardi	France	10:29.61	FB

==== Semifinal 2 ====
Rank	Rower	Country	Time	Notes
1	Benjamin Pritchard	Great Britain	9:46.13	FA
2	Rene Pereira	Brazil	9:55.19	FA
3	Shmuel Daniel	Israel	10:07.43	FA
4	Jaroslaw Kailing	Poland	10:17.79	FB
5	Augustas Navickas	Lithuania	10:23.05	FB
6	Fabrizio Caselli	Italy	10:30.83	FB

=== Finals ===
The A final determined the rankings for places 1 to 6. Additional rankings were determined in the other finals.

==== Final D ====
Rank	Rower	Country	Time
1	Michel Muñoz	Mexico	10:56.17
2	Takayuki Endo	Japan	11:00.69
3	Angel Font	Uruguay	11:01.40
4	Ilian Mladenov	Bulgaria	11:32.71
5	Jose Duarte	Paraguay	12:11.80

==== Final C ====
Rank	Rower	Country	Time
1	Johannes Schmidt	Germany	10:34.70
2	Louis Toussaint	Belgium	10:42.72
3	Alejandro Vera	Argentina	10:48.52
4	Ha Jae-heon	South Korea	10:53.69
5	Zsolt Peto	Hungary	10:59.15
6	Loren Pearson	Canada	11:03.15

==== Final B ====
Rank	Rower	Country	Time
1	Blake Haxton	United States	10:06.33
2	Jaroslaw Kailing	Poland	10:24.62
3	Yang Jie	China	10:29.45
4	Fabrizio Caselli	Italy	10:30.10
5	Augustas Navickas	Lithuania	10:32.21
6	Julien Hardi	France	10:45.51

==== Final A ====
Rank	Rower	Country	Time	Notes
1st place, gold medalist(s)	Roman Polianskyi	Ukraine	9:12.99	WB
2nd place, silver medalist(s)	Alexey Chuvashev	Russia	9:19.43	
3rd place, bronze medalist(s)	Erik Horrie	Australia	9:23.86	
4	Benjamin Pritchard	Great Britain	9:24.80	
5	Rene Pereira	Brazil	9:42.61	
6	Shmuel Daniel	Israel	10:00.98	
