= Rowing at the 2024 Summer Paralympics – PR1M1x =

Men's single sculls at the XVII Paralympic Games
- Venue: Vaires-sur-Marne Nautical Stadium
- Date: 30 August – 1 September 2024
- Competitors: 11 from 11 nations
- Winning time: 9:03.84

Medalists
1st place, gold medalist(s)		Benjamin Pritchard	Great Britain
2nd place, silver medalist(s)		Roman Polianskyi	Ukraine
3rd place, bronze medalist(s)		Giacomo Perini	Italy

The men's single sculls competition at the 2024 Summer Paralympics in Paris took place at the Vaires-sur-Marne Nautical Stadium.

== Results ==
=== Heats ===
The winner of each heat qualified to the finals, the remainder went to the repechage.

==== Heat 1 ====
Rank	Lane	Rower	Nation	Time	Notes
1	5	Roman Polianskyi	Ukraine	9:04.88	FA, PB
2	4	Shmuel Daniel	Israel	9:18.99	R
3	2	Erik Horrie	Australia	10:00.59	R
4	6	Javier García Martínez	Spain	10:13.44	R
5	1	Takaya Mori	Japan	10:19.75	R
6	3	Jacob Wassermann	Canada	11:22.35	R

==== Heat 2 ====
Rank	Lane	Rower	Nation	Time	Notes
1	3	Benjamin Pritchard	Great Britain	8:51.26	FA, PB
2	5	Giacomo Perini	Italy	9:08.50	R
3	1	Alexis Sanchez	France	9:21.58	R
4	2	Marcus Klemp	Germany	9:26.88	R
5	4	Maher Rahmani	Tunisia	10:07.38	R

=== Repechages ===
The first two of each heat qualified to the finals, the remainder went to Final B.

==== Repechage 1 ====
Rank	Lane	Rower	Nation	Time	Notes
1	3	Shmuel Daniel	Israel	9:22.47	FA
2	2	Alexis Sanchez	France	9:24.71	FA
3	4	Javier García Martínez	Spain	9:38.50	FB
4	5	Jacob Wassermann	Canada	11:28.31	FB
–	1	Maher Rahmani	Tunisia		DNS

==== Repechage 2 ====
Rank	Lane	Rower	Nation	Time	Notes
1	3	Erik Horrie	Australia	9:22.15	FA
2	2	Giacomo Perini	Italy	9:24.49	FA
3	1	Marcus Klemp	Germany	9:36.29	FB
4	4	Takuya Mori	Japan	10:23.78	FB

=== Finals ===
==== Final B ====
Rank	Lane	Rower	Nation	Time	Notes
7	3	Marcus Klemp	Germany	9:47.43	
8	2	Javier García Martínez	Spain	9:55.99	
9	4	Takuya Mori	Japan	10:37.74	
10	1	Jacob Wassermann	Canada	11:58.90	

==== Final A ====
Rank	Lane	Rower	Nation	Time	Notes
1st place, gold medalist(s)	4	Benjamin Pritchard	Great Britain	9:03.84	
2nd place, silver medalist(s)	3	Roman Polianskyi	Ukraine	9:14.47	
3rd place, bronze medalist(s)	1	Giacomo Perini	Italy	9:16.38	Reinstated
4	2	Erik Horrie	Australia	9:23.37	
5	5	Shmuel Daniel	Israel	9:36.94	
6	6	Alexis Sanchez	France	9:46.60	
