= Rowing at the 2008 Summer Paralympics – Men's single sculls =

Men's single sculls at the XIII Paralympic Games
- Paralympic Rowing
- Venue: Shunyi Olympic Rowing-Canoeing Park
- Dates: 9–11 September 2008
- Competitors: 12 from 12 nations

Medalists
1st place, gold medalist(s)		Tom Aggar	Great Britain
2nd place, silver medalist(s)		Oleksandr Petrenko	Ukraine
3rd place, bronze medalist(s)		Eli Nawi	Israel

The men's single sculls rowing competition at the 2008 Summer Paralympics was held from 9 to 11 September at the Shunyi Olympic Rowing-Canoeing Park. The event was competed by Category A rowers, propelling boats by use of arms only.

Winners of two heats qualified for the A Final. The remainder rowed in two repechage heats, with the first two in each qualifying for the A Final, the remainder rowing in the B Final.

The event was won by Tom Aggar, representing Great Britain.

== Results ==
=== Heats ===
==== Heat 1 ====
Rowed 9 September at 15:40.

Rank	Rower	Country	Time
1	Oleksandr Petrenko	Ukraine	5:17.36
2	Tan Yeteng	China	5:33.06
3	Simone Miramonti	Italy	5:44.14
4	Ronald Harvey	United States	5:47.55
5	Tibor Serenyi	Hungary	5:49.69
6	Steve Daniel	Canada	6:11.64

==== Heat 2 ====
Rowed 9 September at 16:00.

Rank	Rower	Country	Time
1	Tom Aggar	Great Britain	5:12.25
2	Eli Nawi	Israel	5:25.06
3	Patrick Laureau	France	5:33.39
4	Dominic Monypenny	Australia	5:38.29
5	Antony Bonfim	Brazil	5:55.07
6	Juan Pablo Barcia Alonso	Spain	6:13.69

=== Repechage ===
==== Heat 1 ====
Rowed 10 September at 15:40.

Rank	Rower	Country	Time
1	Tan Yeteng	China	5:45.79
2	Ronald Harvey	United States	5:50.51
3	Patrick Laureau	France	6:03.75
4	Steve Daniel	Canada	6:09.37
5	Antony Bonfim	Brazil	6:21.27

==== Heat 2 ====
Rowed 10 September at 16:00.

Rank	Rower	Country	Time
1	Eli Nawi	Israel	5:49.30
2	Dominic Monypenny	Australia	6:02.45
3	Simone Miramonti	Italy	6:07.65
4	Tibor Serenyi	Hungary	6:08.89
5	Juan Pablo Barcia Alonso	Spain	6:25.87

=== Final Round ===
==== Final B ====
Rowed 11 September at 15:20.

Rank	Rower	Country	Time
1	Patrick Laureau	France	5:44.29
2	Simone Miramonti	Italy	5:45.86
3	Antony Bonfim	Brazil	5:52.23
4	Tibor Serenyi	Hungary	5:53.84
5	Steve Daniel	Canada	5:56.48
6	Juan Pablo Barcia Alonso	Spain	6:15.29

==== Final A ====
Rowed 11 September at 16:40.

Rank	Rower	Country	Time
1st place, gold medalist(s)	Tom Aggar	Great Britain	5:22.09
2nd place, silver medalist(s)	Oleksandr Petrenko	Ukraine	5:26.03
3rd place, bronze medalist(s)	Eli Nawi	Israel	5:39.11
4	Tan Yeteng	China	5:42.25
5	Ronald Harvey	United States	5:46.32
6	Dominic Monypenny	Australia	5:59.92
