= Roman Polianskyi =

Ukrainian Paralympic rower

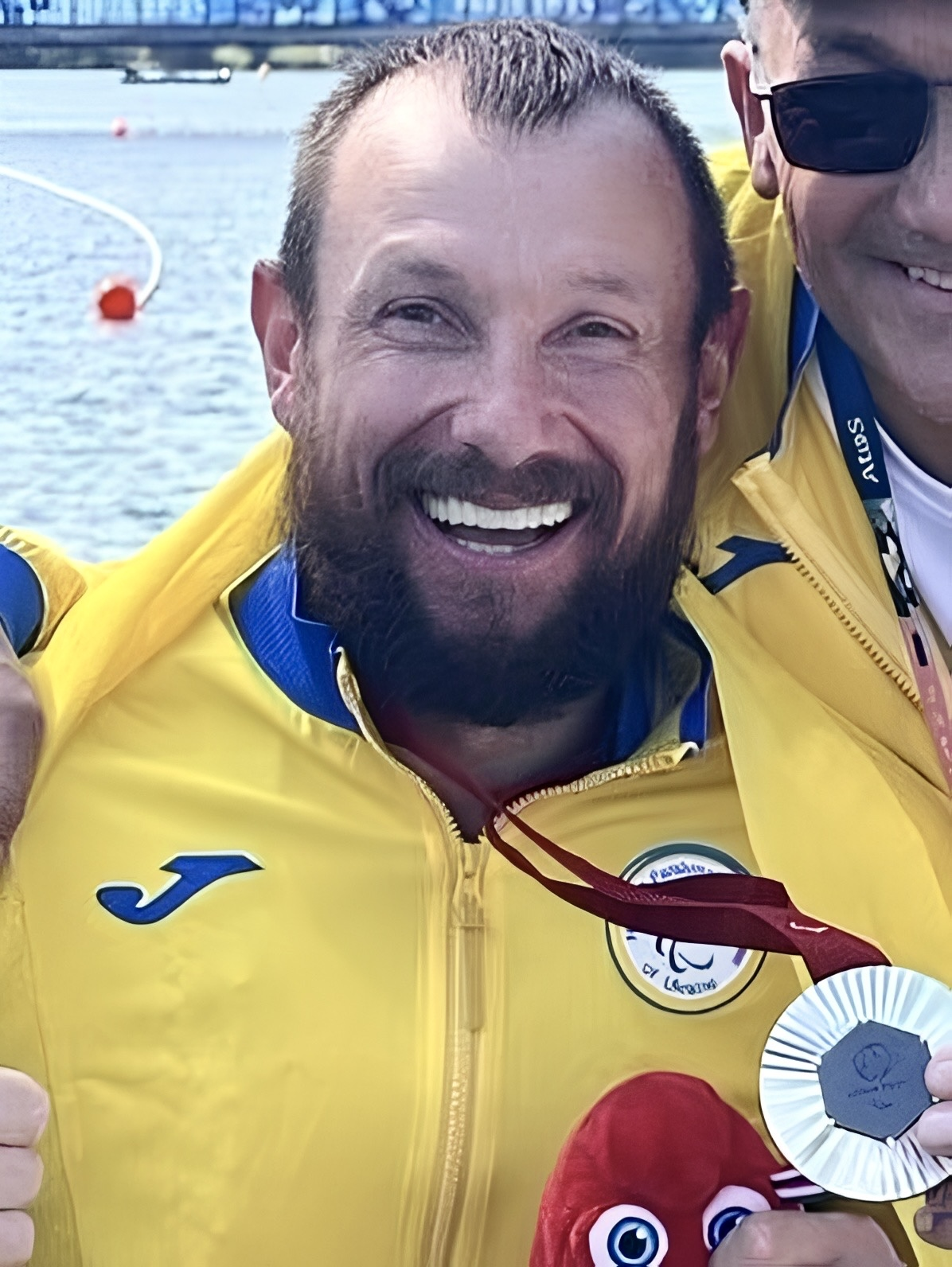
- Polianskyi at the 2024 Summer Paralympics

Personal information
- Native name: Роман Олександрович Полянський
- Born: September 1, 1986 (age 39)
- Home town: Verkhnia Krynka, Donetsk Oblast, Ukrainian SSR, Soviet Union

Sport
- Sport: Para-rowing
- Disability class: PR1
- Event: PR1 Men's single sculls
Medal record
Men's para-rowing
Representing Ukraine
Summer Paralympics
Gold medal – first place	2016 Rio de Janeiro	AS single sculls
Gold medal – first place	2020 Tokyo	PR1 single sculls
Silver medal – second place	2024 Paris	PR1 single sculls
World Championships
Gold medal – first place	2019 Linz Ottensheim	PR1 single sculls
Gold medal – first place	2022 Račice	PR1 single sculls
Gold medal – first place	2023 Belgrade	PR1 single sculls
Silver medal – second place	2017 Sarasota	PR1 single sculls
Silver medal – second place	2018 Plovdiv	PR1 single sculls
Silver medal – second place	2025 Shanghai	PR1 single sculls
Bronze medal – third place	2026 Amsterdam	PR1 single sculls
European Championships
Gold medal – first place	2020 Poznań	PR1 single sculls
Gold medal – first place	2021 Varese	PR1 single sculls
Gold medal – first place	2024 Szeged	PR1 single sculls
Silver medal – second place	2022 Oberschleißheim	PR1 single sculls
Silver medal – second place	2023 Bled	PR1 single sculls
Silver medal – second place	2025 Plovdiv	PR1 single sculls

Roman Oleksandrovych Polianskyi (Ukrainian: Роман Олександрович Полянський; born September 1, 1986) is a Ukrainian pararower. He is the 2016 and 2020 Summer Paralympics gold medalist in the men's single sculls.

== Early life ==
Polianskyi is originally from the village Khanzhenkovo near Makiivka in the Donetsk Province of Ukraine. He started doing sports at the age of four, at the urging of his father. Polianskyi started experiencing symptoms of Strumpell disease at the age of ten. He moved to Odesa in spring 2014, at the start of the 2014 pro-Russian unrest in Ukraine.

Polianskyi was training in rowing for two years prior to the 2016 Rio Paralympic Games. During that time he trained with coach Yuri Bondarenko in Dnipro.

When Polianskyi was 18, his father died from a mining accident; his mother died two years later. Polianskyi has a younger sister.

Polianskyi now uses a wheelchair.

== Athletic career ==
Initially Polianskyi competed in para-canoeing but switched to para-rowing once canoeing was not included in the Rio 2016 Summer Paralympics program. Polianskyi competes in men's PR1 single sculls in para-rowing events. The PR1 classification designates those para-rowing athletes who compete while mainly using their arms and shoulders.

Polianskyi has the medical condition called hereditary spastic paraplegia. The condition is also known as Strumpell disease.

Polianskyi's first para-rowing sports race was in 2014 in Gavirate, Italy, where he came fourth.

He won the gold medal in men's single sculls at the 2016 Summer Paralympics in Rio de Janeiro. In the final race Polianskyi came ahead of the world champion, Erik Horrie of Australia, and the 2008 Paralympic champion, Tom Aggar of Great Britain. In that race Polianskyi also set a new Paralympic record, with the time of 04:39.56. (Note: In 2017, the event distance was extended from 1,000 to 2,000 metres.)

Polianskyi won the silver medal in men's PR1 single sculls at the 2017 World Rowing Championships at Sarasota and also the 2018 World Rowing Championships in Plovdiv.

He won the gold medal in the same discipline at the 2019 World Rowing Championships in Linz Ottensheim. There he also set the new world record in PR1 men's single sculls, at 09:12.99, improving the previous world record by almost 4 seconds. The victory qualified Polianskyi for participation in the 2020 Tokyo Paralympics.

Polianskyi won the gold medal in PR1 single sculls at the Para Rowing International Regatta in Gavirate, Italy in 2017, and again in 2018.

For his 2016 Paralympic victory, Polianskyi was awarded the Order of Merit, 3-d Class, by the President of Ukraine.

Polianskyi holds the rank of Candidate for Master of Sport of Ukraine.
