= 2026 World Rowing Championships – PR1 Men's single sculls =

PR1 Men's single sculls at the 2026 World Rowing Championships
- Venue: Bosbaan
- Location: Amsterdam, Netherlands
- Dates: 27–29 August
- Competitors: 13 from 13 nations
- Winning time: 8:50.46

Medalists
gold medal	Benjamin Pritchard	Great Britain
silver medal	Erik Horrie	Australia
bronze medal	Roman Polianskyi	Ukraine

The PR1 men's single sculls competition at the 2026 World Rowing Championships took place at Bosbaan, in Amsterdam.

== Schedule ==
The schedule was as follows:

Date	Time	Round
Thursday, 27 August 2026	14:26	Heats
Friday 28 August 2026	15:16	Final C
Friday 28 August 2026	17:05	Semifinals
Saturday, 29 August 2026	11:35	Final B
Saturday, 29 August 2026	12:10	Final A

All times are Central European Summer Time (UTC+2)

== Results ==
=== Heats ===
The two fastest boats in each heat and the six fastest times advanced to the semifinals. Remaining crew eliminated.

==== Heat 1 ====
Rank	Rower	Country	Time	Notes
1	Benjamin Pritchard	Great Britain	9:47.23	SF
2	Roman Polianskyi	Ukraine	9:56.90	SF
3	Alexis Sánchez	France	10:11.98	SF
4	Javier García Martínez	Spain	10:16.69	SF
5	Li Qu	China	11:07.20	SF

==== Heat 2 ====
Rank	Rower	Country	Time	Notes
1	Erik Horrie	Australia	10:01.98	SF
2	Marcus Klemp	Germany	10:45.01	SF
3	Lucas Nicolas Poggi	Argentina	11:45.86	SF
4	Krzysztof Ślusarczyk	Poland	12:12.24	

==== Heat 3 ====
Rank	Rower	Country	Time	Notes
1	Giacomo Perini	Italy	10:18.28	SF
2	Shmuel Daniel	Israel	10:22.86	SF
3	Renê Pereira	Brazil	10:28.82	SF
4	Michel Muñoz Malagón	Mexico	11:30.59	SF

=== Semifinals ===
The three fastest boats in each heat advance to the Final A. The remaining boats were sent to the Final B.

==== Semifinal 1 ====
Rank	Rower	Country	Time	Notes
1	Benjamin Pritchard	Great Britain	9:01.96	FA
2	Giacomo Perini	Italy	9:08.21	FA
3	Javier García Martínez	Spain	9:15.29	FA
4	Shmuel Daniel	Israel	9:17.98	FB
5	Lucas Nicolas Poggi	Argentina	10:33.46	FB
	Li Qu	China	DNS	

==== Semifinal 2 ====
Rank	Rower	Country	Time	Notes
1	Erik Horrie	Australia	9:03.75	FA
2	Roman Polianskyi	Ukraine	9:07.44	FA
3	Alexis Sánchez	France	9:21.77	FA
4	Marcus Klemp	Germany	9:29.19	FB
5	Renê Pereira	Brazil	9:42.53	FB
6	Michel Muñoz Malagón	Mexico	10:18.30	FB

=== Finals ===
The A final determined the rankings for places 1 to 6. Additional rankings were determined in the other finals.

==== Final B ====
Rank	Rower	Country	Time	Total rank
1	Shmuel Daniel	Israel	9:19.75	7
2	Marcus Klemp	Germany	9:27.77	8
3	Renê Pereira	Brazil	9:45.48	9
4	Michel Muñoz Malagón	Mexico	10:17.92	10
5	Lucas Nicolas Poggi	Argentina	10:30.17	11

==== Final A ====
Rank	Rower	Country	Time
1st place, gold medalist(s)	Benjamin Pritchard	Great Britain	8:50.46
2nd place, silver medalist(s)	Erik Horrie	Australia	8:57.27
3rd place, bronze medalist(s)	Roman Polianskyi	Ukraine	9:01.38
4	Alexis Sánchez	France	9:09.95
5	Giacomo Perini	Italy	9:17.30
6	Javier García Martínez	Spain	9:46.55
