= 2025 World Rowing Championships – PR1 Men's single sculls =

PR1 Men's single sculls at the 2025 World Rowing Championships
- Venue: Dianshan Lake
- Location: Shanghai, China
- Dates: 22–26 September
- Competitors: 10 from 10 nations
- Winning time: 8:55.65

Medalists
gold medal	Benjamin Pritchard	Great Britain
silver medal	Roman Polianskyi	Ukraine
bronze medal	Erik Horrie	Australia

The PR1 men's single sculls competition at the 2025 World Rowing Championships took place at Dianshan Lake, in Shanghai.

== Schedule ==
The schedule was as follows:

Date	Time	Round
Monday 22 September 2025	10:15	Heats
Friday, 26 September 2025	13:19	Final B
Friday, 26 September 2025	14:20	Final A

All times are UTC+08:00

== Results ==
=== Heats ===
The two fastest boats in each heat and the two fastest times advanced directly to Final A. The remaining boats were sent to Final B.

==== Heat 1 ====
Rank	Rower	Country	Time	Notes
1	Erik Horrie	Australia	8:59.77	FA
2	Roman Polianskyi	Ukraine	9:02.15	FA
3	Renê Pereira	Brazil	9:29.21	FB
4	Michel Muñoz Malagón	Mexico	10:01.88	FB
5	Takuya Mori	Japan	10:02.11	FB

==== Heat 2 ====
Rank	Rower	Country	Time	Notes
1	Benjamin Pritchard	Great Britain	8:56.14	FA, WCHB
2	Giacomo Perini	Italy	9:10.87	FA
3	Alexis Sánchez	France	9:24.90	FA
4	Marcus Klemp	Germany	9:26.70	FA
5	Alaa Hassan Ibrahim	Egypt	10:54.76	FB

=== Finals ===
The A final determined the rankings for places 1 to 6. Additional rankings were determined in the other finals.

==== Final B ====
Rank	Rower	Country	Time	Total rank
1	Renê Pereira	Brazil	9:53.53	7
2	Michel Muñoz Malagón	Mexico	10:07.18	8
3	Takuya Mori	Japan	10:09.56	9
4	Alaa Hassan Ibrahim	Egypt	10:41.51	10

==== Final A ====
Rank	Rower	Country	Time	Notes
1st place, gold medalist(s)	Benjamin Pritchard	Great Britain	8:55.65	WCHB
2nd place, silver medalist(s)	Roman Polianskyi	Ukraine	9:02.74	
3rd place, bronze medalist(s)	Erik Horrie	Australia	9:04.10	
4	Giacomo Perini	Italy	9:15.02	
5	Alexis Sánchez	France	9:23.31	
6	Marcus Klemp	Germany	9:28.70	
