= 2023 World Rowing Championships – PR1 Men's single sculls =

PR1 Men's single sculls at the 2023 World Rowing Championships
- Venue: Lake Sava
- Location: Belgrade, Serbia
- Dates: 5 September – 10 September
- Competitors: 21 from 21 nations
- Winning time: 8:59.60

Medalists
gold medal	Roman Polianskyi	Ukraine
silver medal	Giacomo Perini	Italy
bronze medal	Benjamin Pritchard	Great Britain

The PR1 Men's single sculls competition at the 2023 World Rowing Championships took place at Lake Sava, in Belgrade.

== Schedule ==
The schedule was as follows:

Date	Time	Round
Tuesday 5 September 2023	09:30	Heats
Wednesday 6 September 2023	9:50	Repechages
Thursday 7 September 2023	15:05	Semifinals C/D
Friday 8 September 2023	09:35	Semifinals A/B
Sunday 10 September 2023	09:30	Final D
Sunday 10 September 2023	10:08	Final C
Sunday 10 September 2023	10:56	Final B
Sunday 10 September 2023	13:05	Final A

All times are Central European Summer Time (UTC+2)

== Results ==
=== Heats ===
The best fastest boats advanced directly to AB semifinals. The remaining boats were sent to the repechages.

==== Heat 1 ====
Rank	Rower	Country	Time	Notes
1	Giacomo Perini	Italy	9:09.22	SA/B
2	Shmuel Daniel	Israel	9:14.80	R
3	Alexis Sanchez	France	9:40.24	R
4	Andrew Mangan	United States	10:06.50	R
5	Michel Muñoz	Mexico	10:09.64	R
6	Arkadiusz Skrzypiński	Poland	10:44.48	R

==== Heat 2 ====
Rank	Rower	Country	Time	Notes
1	Roman Polianskyi	Ukraine	9:07.83	SA/B
2	Renê Pereira	Brazil	9:13.25	R
3	Javier García Martinez	Spain	9:16.62	R
4	Temirkhan Daiyrbek	Kazakhstan	10:50.00	R
5	Almaz Sharafiev	Individual Neutral Athletes	11:30.25	R
	Takuya Mori	Japan	DNS	

==== Heat 3 ====
Rank	Rower	Country	Time	Notes
1	Erik Horrie	Australia	9:06.48	SA/B
2	Marcus Klemp	Germany	10:00.77	R
3	Maher Rahmani	Tunisia	10:12.12	R
4	Lifa Hlongwa	South Africa	10:36.87	R
5	Tomáš Nevěčný	Czech Republic	11:40.13	R

==== Heat 4 ====
Rank	Rower	Country	Time	Notes
1	Benjamin Pritchard	Great Britain	9:08.82	SA/B
2	Egamberdiev Kholmurod	Uzbekistan	9:34.61	R
3	Alejandro Magno Vera	Argentina	10:33.60	R
4	Zsolt Peto	Hungary	10:39.78	R
5	Christoph Stadlbauer	Austria	12:27.75	R

=== Repechages ===
The two fastest boats in each heat advanced directly to the AB semifinals. The remaining boats were sent to the CD semifinals

==== Repechage 1 ====
Rank	Rower	Country	Time	Notes
1	Egamberdiev Kholmurod	Uzbekistan	9:49.53	SA/B
2	Michel Muñoz	Mexico	10:15.04	SA/B
3	Maher Rahmani	Tunisia	10:27.16	SC/D
4	Temirkhan Daiyrbek	Kazakhstan	10:41.24	SC/D

==== Repechage 2 ====
Rank	Rower	Country	Time	Notes
1	Marcus Klemp	Germany	9:35.24	SA/B
2	Javier García Martinez	Spain	9:45.76	SA/B
3	Andrew Mangan	United States	10:22.85	SC/D
4	Christoph Stadlbauer	Austria	12:42.89	SC/D

==== Repechage 3 ====
Rank	Rower	Country	Time	Notes
1	Alexis Sanchez	France	9:54.75	SA/B
2	Renê Pereira	Brazil	10:06.76	SA/B
3	Zsolt Peto	Hungary	11:27.59	SC/D
4	Tomáš Nevěčný	Czech Republic	12:53.09	SC/D

==== Repechage 4 ====
Rank	Rower	Country	Time	Notes
1	Shmuel Daniel	Israel	9:47.90	SA/B
2	Arkadiusz Skrzypiński	Poland	11:06.20	SA/B
3	Lifa Hlongwa	South Africa	11:16.38	SC/D
4	Alejandro Magno Vera	Argentina	11:23.36	SC/D
5	Almaz Sharafiev	Individual Neutral Athletes	11:48.31	SC/D

=== Semifinals C/D ===
The three fastest boats in each semifinal advanced to the C final. The remaining boats were sent to the D final.

==== Semifinal 1 ====
Rank	Rower	Country	Time	Notes
1	Maher Rahmani	Tunisia	11:55.09	FC
2	Lifa Hlongwa	South Africa	12:55.43	FC
3	Almaz Sharafiev	Individual Neutral Athletes	14:52.14	FC
4	Christoph Stadlbauer	Austria	15:18.84	FD
5	Tomáš Nevěčný	Czech Republic	16:19.88	FD

==== Semifinal 2 ====
Rank	Rower	Country	Time	Notes
1	Andrew Mangan	United States	12:03.42	FC
2	Temirkhan Daiyrbek	Kazakhstan	13:00.19	FC
3	Zsolt Peto	Hungary	13:20.88	FC
4	Alejandro Magno Vera	Argentina	13:55.70	FD

=== Semifinals A/B ===
The three fastest boats in each semifinal advanced to the A final. The remaining boats were sent to the B final.

==== Semifinal 1 ====
Rank	Rower	Country	Time	Notes
1	Giacomo Perini	Italy	9:18.90	FA
2	Roman Polianskyi	Ukraine	9:20.61	FA
3	Shmuel Daniel	Israel	9:35.04	FA
4	Alexis Sanchez	France	9:43.28	FB
5	Javier García Martinez	Spain	9:45.15	FB
6	Michel Muñoz	Mexico	10:30.46	FB

==== Semifinal 2 ====
Rank	Rower	Country	Time	Notes
1	Benjamin Pritchard	Great Britain	9:21.76	FA
2	Marcus Klemp	Germany	9:26.86	FA
3	Erik Horrie	Australia	9:33.73	FA
4	Egamberdiev Kholmurod	Uzbekistan	9:35.51	FB
5	Renê Pereira	Brazil	9:41.09	FB
6	Arkadiusz Skrzypiński	Poland	11:15.09	FB

=== Finals ===
The A final determined the rankings for places 1 to 6. Additional rankings were determined in the other finals.

==== Final D ====
Rank	Rower	Country	Time	Total rank
1	Alejandro Magno Vera	Argentina	10:42.52	19
2	Tomáš Nevěčný	Czech Republic	11:37.91	20
3	Christoph Stadlbauer	Austria	12:19.60	21

==== Final C ====
Rank	Rower	Country	Time	Total rank
1	Temirkhan Daiyrbek	Kazakhstan	9:46.64	13
2	Andrew Mangan	United States	9:58.45	14
3	Maher Rahmani	Tunisia	10:06.52	15
4	Lifa Hlongwa	South Africa	10:26.48	16
5	Almaz Sharafiev	Individual Neutral Athletes	10:41.87	17
6	Zsolt Peto	Hungary	10:54.37	18

==== Final B ====
Rank	Rower	Country	Time	Total rank
1	Egamberdiev Kholmurod	Uzbekistan	9:14.79	7
2	Javier García Martinez	Spain	9:18.07	8
3	Alexis Sanchez	France	9:27.37	9
4	Renê Pereira	Brazil	9:35.63	10
5	Michel Muñoz	Mexico	10:06.30	11
6	Arkadiusz Skrzypiński	Poland	10:41.34	12

==== Final A ====
Rank	Rower	Country	Time
1st place, gold medalist(s)	Roman Polianskyi	Ukraine	8:59.60
2nd place, silver medalist(s)	Giacomo Perini	Italy	9:04.40
3rd place, bronze medalist(s)	Benjamin Pritchard	Great Britain	9:09.43
4	Marcus Klemp	Germany	9:16.17
5	Shmuel Daniel	Israel	9:17.81
	Erik Horrie	Australia	DNS
