= 2019 European Table Tennis Championships – Men's team =

Men's team at the 2019 European Table Tennis Championships
- Venue: Salle Sportive Métropolitaine
- Location: Nantes, France
- Dates: 3–8 September
- Competitors: 106 from 24 nations

Medalists
gold medal	Timo Boll; Patrick Franziska; Dimitrij Ovtcharov; Ruwen Filus; Benedikt Duda	Germany
silver medal	Tiago Apolónia; Marcos Freitas; João Monteiro; Diogo Chen; Diogo Carvalho	Portugal
bronze medal	Emmanuel Lebesson; Simon Gauzy; Tristan Flore; Can Akkuzu; Andréa Landrieu	France
bronze medal	Jon Persson; Mattias Falck; Truls Möregård; Kristian Karlsson; Anton Källberg	Sweden

The men's team tournament of the 2019 European Table Tennis Championships was held from 3 to 8 September 2019.

Germany defeated Portugal in the final to capture the gold medal.

== Preliminary round ==
The top team of each group advances.

=== Group A ===
Pos	Team	Pld	W	L	MF	MA	MD	Pts	Qualification	Germany	Russia	Czech Republic
1	Germany	2	2	0	6	0	+6	4	Quarterfinals	—	3–0	3–0
2	Russia	2	1	1	3	4	−1	3		0–3	—	3–1
3	Czech Republic	2	0	2	1	6	−5	2		0–3	1–3	—

Source: ITTF
Rules for classification: 1) Points; 2) Head-to-head points; 3) Head-to-head matches; 4) Head-to-head sets

3 September 2019; 19:00	Report	Russia	3–1	Czech Republic	Salle Sportive Métropolitaine, Nantes
Score by game:
Alexander Shibaev	3–0	Lubomír Jančařík
Kirill Skachkov	1–3	Pavel Širuček
Vladimir Sidorenko	3–1	Tomáš Polanský
Alexander Shibaev	3–0	Pavel Širuček

4 September 2019; 16:00	Report	Germany	3–0	Czech Republic	Salle Sportive Métropolitaine, Nantes
Score by game:
Timo Boll	3–0	Pavel Širuček
Dimitrij Ovtcharov	3–1	Tomáš Polanský
Patrick Franziska	3–2	Lubomír Jančařík

5 September 2019; 16:00	Report	Germany	3–0	Russia	Salle Sportive Métropolitaine, Nantes
Score by game:
Timo Boll	3–1	Kirill Skachkov
Dimitrij Ovtcharov	3–2	Alexander Shibaev
Patrick Franziska	3–1	Vladimir Sidorenko

=== Group B ===
Pos	Team	Pld	W	L	MF	MA	MD	Pts	Qualification	Sweden	Romania	Hungary
1	Sweden	2	2	0	6	1	+5	4	Quarterfinals	—	3–0	3–1
2	Romania	2	1	1	3	4	−1	3		0–3	—	3–1
3	Hungary	2	0	2	2	6	−4	2		1–3	1–3	—

Source: ITTF
Rules for classification: 1) Points; 2) Head-to-head points; 3) Head-to-head matches; 4) Head-to-head sets

3 September 2019; 13:00	Report	Romania	3–1	Hungary	Salle Sportive Métropolitaine, Nantes
Score by game:
Cristian Pletea	3–0	Tamás Lakatos
Ovidiu Ionescu	2–3	Bence Majoros
Rareş Şipoş	3–2	Ádám Szudi
Cristian Pletea	3–1	Bence Majoros

4 September 2019; 16:00	Report	Sweden	3–1	Hungary	Salle Sportive Métropolitaine, Nantes
Score by game:
Jon Persson	3–1	Ádám Szudi
Mattias Falck	1–3	Bence Majoros
Truls Möregård	3–1	Tamás Lakatos
Mattias Falck	3–2	Ádám Szudi

5 September 2019; 13:00	Report	Sweden	3–0	Romania	Salle Sportive Métropolitaine, Nantes
Score by game:
Jon Persson	3–0	Ovidiu Ionescu
Mattias Falck	3–2	Rareş Şipoş
Kristian Karlsson	3–2	Cristian Pletea

=== Group C ===
Pos	Team	Pld	W	L	MF	MA	MD	Pts	Qualification	France	Spain	Slovakia
1	France	2	2	0	6	1	+5	4	Quarterfinals	—	3–1	3–0
2	Spain	2	1	1	4	5	−1	3		1–3	—	3–2
3	Slovakia	2	0	2	2	6	−4	2		0–3	2–3	—

Source: ITTF
Rules for classification: 1) Points; 2) Head-to-head points; 3) Head-to-head matches; 4) Head-to-head sets

3 September 2019; 10:00	Report	Slovakia	2–3	Spain	Salle Sportive Métropolitaine, Nantes
3 September 2019; 10:00	Report	Score by game:			Salle Sportive Métropolitaine, Nantes
3 September 2019; 10:00	Report	Ľubomír Pištej	3–2	Álvaro Robles	Salle Sportive Métropolitaine, Nantes
Wang Yang			3–1	Jesus Cantero
Alexander Valuch			1–3	Carlos Machado
Wang Yang			1–3	Álvaro Robles
Ľubomír Pištej			0–3	Jesus Cantero
			–

4 September 2019; 19:00	Report	France	3–1	Spain	Salle Sportive Métropolitaine, Nantes
Score by game:
Emmanuel Lebesson	3–1	Álvaro Robles
Simon Gauzy	3–0	Jesus Cantero
Tristan Flore	1–3	Carlos Machado
Simon Gauzy	3–2	Álvaro Robles

5 September 2019; 19:00	Report	France	3–0	Slovakia	Salle Sportive Métropolitaine, Nantes
Score by game:
Simon Gauzy	3–0	Alexander Valuch
Emmanuel Lebesson	3–0	Ľubomír Pištej
Can Akkuzu	3–0	Wang Yang

=== Group D ===
Pos	Team	Pld	W	L	MF	MA	MD	Pts	Qualification	Austria	Denmark	Ukraine
1	Austria	2	2	0	6	2	+4	4	Quarterfinals	—	3–2	3–0
2	Denmark	2	1	1	5	4	+1	3		2–3	—	3–1
3	Ukraine	2	0	2	1	6	−5	2		0–3	1–3	—

Source: ITTF
Rules for classification: 1) Points; 2) Head-to-head points; 3) Head-to-head matches; 4) Head-to-head sets

3 September 2019; 19:00	Report	Denmark	3–1	Ukraine	Salle Sportive Métropolitaine, Nantes
Score by game:
Jonathan Groth	3–1	Yaroslav Zhmudenko
Anders Lind	2–3	Yevhen Pryshchepa
Tobias Rasmussen	3–2	Viktor Yefimov
Jonathan Groth	3–2	Yevhen Pryshchepa

4 September 2019; 19:00	Report	Austria	3–0	Ukraine	Salle Sportive Métropolitaine, Nantes
Score by game:
Stefan Fegerl	3–1	Yevhen Pryshchepa
Daniel Habesohn	3–1	Yaroslav Zhmudenko
Robert Gardos	3–0	Viktor Yefimov

5 September 2019; 19:00	Report	Austria	3–2	Denmark	Salle Sportive Métropolitaine, Nantes
5 September 2019; 19:00	Report	Score by game:			Salle Sportive Métropolitaine, Nantes
5 September 2019; 19:00	Report	Robert Gardos	3–0	Jonathan Groth	Salle Sportive Métropolitaine, Nantes
Daniel Habesohn			2–3	Anders Lind
Stefan Fegerl			3–0	Tobias Rasmussen
Daniel Habesohn			2–3	Jonathan Groth
Robert Gardos			3–1	Anders Lind
			–

=== Group E ===
Pos	Team	Pld	W	L	MF	MA	MD	Pts	Qualification	Slovenia	Croatia	Netherlands
1	Slovenia	2	2	0	6	1	+5	4	Quarterfinals	—	3–1	3–0
2	Croatia	2	1	1	4	3	+1	3		1–3	—	3–0
3	Netherlands	2	0	2	0	6	−6	2		0–3	0–3	—

Source: ITTF
Rules for classification: 1) Points; 2) Head-to-head points; 3) Head-to-head matches; 4) Head-to-head sets

3 September 2019; 16:00	Report	Croatia	3–0	Netherlands	Salle Sportive Métropolitaine, Nantes
Score by game:
Tomislav Pucar	3–1	Rajko Gommers
Andrej Gaćina	3–0	Laurens Tromer
Frane Kojić	3–1	Ewout Oostwouder

4 September 2019; 13:00	Report	Slovenia	3–0	Netherlands	Salle Sportive Métropolitaine, Nantes
Score by game:
Bojan Tokić	3–0	Ewout Oostwouder
Darko Jorgić	3–0	Laurens Tromer
Deni Kožul	3–0	Rajko Gommers

5 September 2019; 10:00	Report	Slovenia	3–1	Croatia	Salle Sportive Métropolitaine, Nantes
Score by game:
Darko Jorgić	3–2	Andrej Gaćina
Bojan Tokić	3–2	Tomislav Pucar
Deni Kožul	2–3	Frane Kojić
Darko Jorgić	3–1	Tomislav Pucar

=== Group F ===
Pos	Team	Pld	W	L	MF	MA	MD	Pts	Qualification	England	Belarus	Luxembourg
1	England	2	2	0	6	2	+4	4	Quarterfinals	—	3–1	3–1
2	Belarus	2	1	1	4	3	+1	3		1–3	—	3–0
3	Luxembourg	2	0	2	1	6	−5	2		1–3	0–3	—

Source: ITTF
Rules for classification: 1) Points; 2) Head-to-head points; 3) Head-to-head matches; 4) Head-to-head sets

3 September 2019; 16:00	Report	England	3–1	Luxembourg	Salle Sportive Métropolitaine, Nantes
Score by game:
Paul Drinkhall	3–1	Eric Glod
Sam Walker	3–0	Gilles Michely
Tom Jarvis	1–3	Luka Mladenovic
Sam Walker	3–2	Eric Glod

4 September 2019; 13:00	Report	Belarus	3–0	Luxembourg	Salle Sportive Métropolitaine, Nantes
Score by game:
Pavel Platonov	3–1	Luka Mladenovic
Vladimir Samsonov	3–0	Eric Glod
Aliaksandr Khanin	3–1	Christian Kill

5 September 2019; 10:00	Report	Belarus	1–3	England	Salle Sportive Métropolitaine, Nantes
Score by game:
Pavel Platonov	1–3	Liam Pitchford
Vladimir Samsonov	3–0	Paul Drinkhall
Aliaksandr Khanin	1–3	Sam Walker
Vladimir Samsonov	1–3	Liam Pitchford

=== Group G ===
Pos	Team	Pld	W	L	MF	MA	MD	Pts	Qualification	Poland	Serbia	Belgium
1	Poland	2	2	0	6	4	+2	4	Quarterfinals	—	3–2	3–2
2	Serbia	2	1	1	5	5	0	3		2–3	—	3–2
3	Belgium	2	0	2	4	6	−2	2		2–3	2–3	—

Source: ITTF
Rules for classification: 1) Points; 2) Head-to-head points; 3) Head-to-head matches; 4) Head-to-head sets

3 September 2019; 13:00	Report	Belgium	2–3	Serbia	Salle Sportive Métropolitaine, Nantes
3 September 2019; 13:00	Report	Score by game:			Salle Sportive Métropolitaine, Nantes
3 September 2019; 13:00	Report	Cédric Nuytinck	3–0	Zsolt Peto	Salle Sportive Métropolitaine, Nantes
Florent Lambiet			1–3	Aleksandar Karakašević
Robin Devos			1–3	Marko Jevtović
Cédric Nuytinck			3–2	Aleksandar Karakašević
Florent Lambiet			2–3	Zsolt Peto
			–

4 September 2019; 10:00	Report	Poland	3–2	Serbia	Salle Sportive Métropolitaine, Nantes
4 September 2019; 10:00	Report	Score by game:			Salle Sportive Métropolitaine, Nantes
4 September 2019; 10:00	Report	Marek Badowski	3–0	Aleksandar Karakašević	Salle Sportive Métropolitaine, Nantes
Jakub Dyjas			3–1	Zsolt Peto
Samuel Kulczycki			0–3	Marko Jevtović
Jakub Dyjas			2–3	Aleksandar Karakašević
Marek Badowski			3–1	Zsolt Peto
			–

5 September 2019; 13:00	Report	Poland	3–2	Belgium	Salle Sportive Métropolitaine, Nantes
5 September 2019; 13:00	Report	Score by game:			Salle Sportive Métropolitaine, Nantes
5 September 2019; 13:00	Report	Marek Badowski	3–0	Cédric Nuytinck	Salle Sportive Métropolitaine, Nantes
Jakub Dyjas			2–3	Florent Lambiet
Samuel Kulczycki			1–3	Martin Allegro
Jakub Dyjas			3–0	Cédric Nuytinck
Marek Badowski			3–2	Florent Lambiet
			–

=== Group H ===
Pos	Team	Pld	W	L	MF	MA	MD	Pts	Qualification	Portugal	Greece	Turkey
1	Portugal	2	2	0	6	0	+6	4	Quarterfinals	—	3–0	3–0
2	Greece	2	1	1	3	3	0	3		0–3	—	3–0
3	Turkey	2	0	2	0	6	−6	2		0–3	0–3	—

Source: ITTF
Rules for classification: 1) Points; 2) Head-to-head points; 3) Head-to-head matches; 4) Head-to-head sets

3 September 2019; 10:00	Report	Portugal	3–0	Turkey	Salle Sportive Métropolitaine, Nantes
Score by game:
Marcos Freitas	3–1	Abdullah Yiğenler
Tiago Apolónia	3–1	İbrahim Gündüz
João Monteiro	3–0	Ziver Gündüz

4 September 2019; 10:00	Report	Greece	3–0	Turkey	Salle Sportive Métropolitaine, Nantes
Score by game:
Panagiotis Gionis	3–2	Abdullah Yiğenler
Ioannis Sgouropoulos	3–0	İbrahim Gündüz
Konstantinos Konstaninopoulos	3–0	Zihni Şahin

5 September 2019; 16:00	Report	Greece	0–3	Portugal	Salle Sportive Métropolitaine, Nantes
Score by game:
Panagiotis Gionis	1–3	Marcos Freitas
Kalinikos Kreanga	0–3	João Monteiro
Ioannis Sgouropoulos	0–3	Tiago Apolónia

== Knockout stage ==
All times are local (UTC+2).

Quarterfinals
6 September
Germany	3
Slovenia	0
6 September
Poland	2
France	3
6 September
Austria	1
Portugal	3
6 September
England	0
Sweden	3

Semifinals
7 September
Germany	3
France	0
7 September
Portugal	3
Sweden	2

Final
8 September
Germany	3
Portugal	0

=== Quarterfinals ===
6 September 2019; 10:00	Report	Germany	3–0	Slovenia	Salle Sportive Métropolitaine, Nantes
Score by game:
Dimitrij Ovtcharov	3–2	Darko Jorgić
Timo Boll	3–0	Bojan Tokić
Patrick Franziska	3–0	Deni Kožul

6 September 2019; 19:00	Report	Poland	2–3	France	Salle Sportive Métropolitaine, Nantes
6 September 2019; 19:00	Report	Score by game:			Salle Sportive Métropolitaine, Nantes
6 September 2019; 19:00	Report	Marek Badowski	3–1	Simon Gauzy	Salle Sportive Métropolitaine, Nantes
Jakub Dyjas			3–2	Emmanuel Lebesson
Maciej Kubik			0–3	Can Akkuzu
Jakub Dyjas			1–3	Simon Gauzy
Marek Badowski			1–3	Emmanuel Lebesson
			–

6 September 2019; 16:00	Report	Austria	1–3	Portugal	Salle Sportive Métropolitaine, Nantes
Score by game:
Robert Gardos	3–0	Tiago Apolónia
Daniel Habesohn	1–3	Marcos Freitas
Stefan Fegerl	1–3	João Monteiro
Daniel Habesohn	0–3	Tiago Apolónia

6 September 2019; 13:00	Report	England	0–3	Sweden	Salle Sportive Métropolitaine, Nantes
Score by game:
Liam Pitchford	0–3	Jon Persson
Paul Drinkhall	1–3	Mattias Falck
Sam Walker	1–3	Truls Möregård

=== Semifinals ===
7 September 2019; 19:00	Report	Germany	3–0	France	Salle Sportive Métropolitaine, Nantes
Score by game:
Timo Boll	3–1	Simon Gauzy
Dimitrij Ovtcharov	3–1	Emmanuel Lebesson
Patrick Franziska	3–1	Can Akkuzu

7 September 2019; 16:00	Report	Portugal	3–2	Sweden	Salle Sportive Métropolitaine, Nantes
7 September 2019; 16:00	Report	Score by game:			Salle Sportive Métropolitaine, Nantes
7 September 2019; 16:00	Report	Marcos Freitas	2–3	Jon Persson	Salle Sportive Métropolitaine, Nantes
Tiago Apolónia			3–2	Mattias Falck
João Monteiro			1–3	Truls Möregård
Marcos Freitas			3–1	Mattias Falck
Tiago Apolónia			3–2	Jon Persson
			–

=== Final ===
8 September 2019; 16:00	Report	Germany	3–0	Portugal	Salle Sportive Métropolitaine, Nantes
Score by game:
Dimitrij Ovtcharov	3–0	Marcos Freitas
Timo Boll	3–1	João Monteiro
Patrick Franziska	3–0	Tiago Apolónia
