= 2017 World Rowing Championships – PR1 Men's single sculls =

PR1 Men's single sculls at the 2017 World Rowing Championships
- Venue: Nathan Benderson Park
- Location: Sarasota, United States
- Dates: 26 September – 1 October
- Competitors: 17 from 17 nations
- Winning time: 9:39.48

Medalists
gold medal	Erik Horrie	Australia
silver medal	Roman Polianskyi	Ukraine
bronze medal	Alexey Chuvashev	Russia

The PR1 men's single sculls competition at the 2017 World Rowing Championships in Sarasota took place in Nathan Benderson Park.

== Schedule ==
The schedule was as follows:

Date	Time	Round
Tuesday 26 September 2017	10:20	Heats
Wednesday 27 September 2017	10:00	Repechages
Friday 29 September 2017	09:45	Semifinals A/B
Saturday 30 September 2017	08:50	Final C
Sunday 1 October 2017	08:50	Final B
Sunday 1 October 2017	09:53	Final A

All times are Eastern Daylight Time (UTC−4)

== Results ==
=== Heats ===
The two fastest boats in each heat advanced directly to the A/B semifinals. The remaining boats were sent to the repechages.

==== Heat 1 ====
Rank	Rowers	Country	Time	Notes
1	Roman Polianskyi	Ukraine	10:07.32	SA/B, WCHB
2	Rene Pereira	Brazil	10:28.83	SA/B
3	Augustas Navickas	Lithuania	10:59.68	R
4	Johannes Schmidt	Germany	11:10.81	R
5	Zsolt Peto	Hungary	11:43.70	R
–	Yang Jie	China	DNS	–

==== Heat 2 ====
Rank	Rowers	Country	Time	Notes
1	Alexey Chuvashev	Russia	10:02.35	SA/B, WCHB
2	Andrew Houghton	Great Britain	10:11.27	SA/B
3	Blake Haxton	United States	10:21.95	R
4	Klaus Dolleschal	Austria	10:47.20	R
5	Simone Baldini	Italy	10:50.46	R
6	Shmuel Daniel	Israel	10:56.95	R

==== Heat 3 ====
Rank	Rowers	Country	Time	Notes
1	Erik Horrie	Australia	10:01.74	SA/B, WCHB
2	Jaroslaw Kailing	Poland	10:42.29	SA/B
3	Pascal Daniere	France	10:53.08	R
4	Louis Toussaint	Belgium	12:04.82	R
5	Daniel de la Vega	Mexico	12:53.17	R

=== Repechages ===
The three fastest boats in each repechage advanced to the A/B semifinals. The remaining boats were sent to the C final.

==== Repechage 1 ====
Rank	Rowers	Country	Time	Notes
1	Augustas Navickas	Lithuania	11:15.63	SA/B
2	Klaus Dolleschal	Austria	11:18.17	SA/B
3	Pascal Daniere	France	11:19.97	SA/B
4	Shmuel Daniel	Israel	11:23.25	FC
5	Daniel de la Vega	Mexico	13:36.75	FC

==== Repechage 2 ====
Rank	Rowers	Country	Time	Notes
1	Blake Haxton	United States	10:54.60	SA/B
2	Johannes Schmidt	Germany	11:24.08	SA/B
3	Simone Baldini	Italy	11:29.12	SA/B
4	Louis Toussaint	Belgium	12:03.17	FC
5	Zsolt Peto	Hungary	12:05.40	FC

=== Semifinals ===
The three fastest boats in each semi advanced to the A final. The remaining boats were sent to the B final.

==== Semifinal 1 ====
Rank	Rowers	Country	Time	Notes
1	Roman Polianskyi	Ukraine	9:59.54	FA, WCHB
2	Alexey Chuvashev	Russia	10:30.82	FA
3	Blake Haxton	United States	10:47.55	FA
4	Simone Baldini	Italy	11:03.18	FB
5	Jaroslaw Kailing	Poland	11:04.32	FB
6	Klaus Dolleschal	Austria	11:08.49	FB

==== Semifinal 2 ====
Rank	Rowers	Country	Time	Notes
1	Erik Horrie	Australia	10:20.54	FA
2	Andrew Houghton	Great Britain	10:30.62	FA
3	Rene Pereira	Brazil	10:41.52	FA
4	Johannes Schmidt	Germany	10:56.84	FB
5	Augustas Navickas	Lithuania	11:16.40	FB
6	Pascal Daniere	France	11:21.40	FB

=== Finals ===
The A final determined the rankings for places 1 to 6. Additional rankings were determined in the other finals.

==== Final C ====
Rank	Rowers	Country	Time
1	Louis Toussaint	Belgium	11:11.87
2	Zsolt Peto	Hungary	11:16.00
3	Daniel de la Vega	Mexico	12:32.28
4	Shmuel Daniel	Israel	DNS

==== Final B ====
Rank	Rowers	Country	Time
1	Johannes Schmidt	Germany	10:45.28
2	Jaroslaw Kailing	Poland	10:51.32
3	Augustas Navickas	Lithuania	10:53.79
4	Simone Baldini	Italy	10:58.71
5	Pascal Daniere	France	11:11.09
6	Klaus Dolleschal	Austria	11:19.55

==== Final A ====
Rank	Rowers	Country	Time	Notes
1st place, gold medalist(s)	Erik Horrie	Australia	9:39.48	WB
2nd place, silver medalist(s)	Roman Polianskyi	Ukraine	9:47.89	
3rd place, bronze medalist(s)	Alexey Chuvashev	Russia	9:52.25	
4	Andrew Houghton	Great Britain	10:02.21	
5	Rene Pereira	Brazil	10:13.21	
6	Blake Haxton	United States	10:17.51	
