= 2018 World Rowing Championships – PR1 Men's single sculls =

PR1 Men's single sculls at the 2018 World Rowing Championships
- Venue: Plovdiv Regatta Venue
- Location: Plovdiv, Bulgaria
- Dates: 11–16 September
- Competitors: 19 from 19 nations
- Winning time: 9:16.90

Medalists
gold medal	Erik Horrie	Australia
silver medal	Roman Polianskyi	Ukraine
bronze medal	Alexey Chuvashev	Russia

The PR1 men's single sculls competition at the 2018 World Rowing Championships in Plovdiv took place at the Plovdiv Regatta Venue.

== Schedule ==
The schedule was as follows:

Date	Time	Round
Tuesday 11 September 2018	09:30	Heats
Wednesday 12 September 2018	09:50	Repechages
Thursday 13 September 2018	16:53	Semifinals C/D
Friday 14 September 2018	10:23	Semifinals A/B
Saturday 15 September 2018	15:33	Final D
Sunday 16 September 2018	09:30	Final C
Sunday 16 September 2018	10:20	Final B
Sunday 16 September 2018	11:33	Final A

All times are Eastern European Summer Time (UTC+3)

== Results ==
=== Heats ===
The two fastest boats in each heat advanced directly to the A/B semifinals. The remaining boats were sent to the repechages.

==== Heat 1 ====
Rank	Rowers	Country	Time	Notes
1	Roman Polianskyi	Ukraine	9:58.48	SA/B
2	Fabrizio Caselli	Italy	10:15.21	SA/B
3	Augustas Navickas	Lithuania	10:28.92	R
4	Shmuel Daniel	Israel	10:35.57	R
5	Alejandro Vera	Argentina	10:39.05	R

==== Heat 2 ====
Rank	Rowers	Country	Time	Notes
1	Andrew Houghton	Great Britain	10:01.96	SA/B
2	Rene Pereira	Brazil	10:03.93	SA/B
3	Louis Toussaint	Belgium	10:40.21	R
4	Zsolt Peto	Hungary	11:02.55	R
5	Jose Duarte	Paraguay	13:25.66	R

==== Heat 3 ====
Rank	Rowers	Country	Time	Notes
1	Alexey Chuvashev	Russia	9:42.15	SA/B
2	Blake Haxton	United States	10:09.30	SA/B
3	Kingsley Okoroafor	Nigeria	10:39.66	R
4	Takayuki Endo	Japan	10:42.36	R
5	Maksim Miatlou	Belarus	11:04.94	R

==== Heat 4 ====
Rank	Rowers	Country	Time	Notes
1	Erik Horrie	Australia	9:25.11	SA/B, WB
2	Jaroslaw Kailing	Poland	10:01.65	SA/B
3	Julien Hardi	France	10:20.61	R
4	Manesh Jayakodi	Sri Lanka	11:36.55	R

=== Repechages ===
The two fastest boats in each repechage advanced to the A/B semifinals. The remaining boats were sent to the C/D semifinals.

==== Repechage 1 ====
Rank	Rowers	Country	Time	Notes
1	Augustas Navickas	Lithuania	10:23.24	SA/B
2	Kingsley Okoroafor	Nigeria	10:35.05	SA/B
3	Alejandro Vera	Argentina	10:35.46	SC/D
4	Zsolt Peto	Hungary	10:39.41	SC/D
5	Manesh Jayakodi	Sri Lanka	11:27.16	SC/D

==== Repechage 2 ====
Rank	Rowers	Country	Time	Notes
1	Julien Hardi	France	10:21.92	SA/B
2	Louis Toussaint	Belgium	10:25.30	SA/B
3	Shmuel Daniel	Israel	10:30.94	SC/D
4	Takayuki Endo	Japan	10:47.89	SC/D
5	Maksim Miatlou	Belarus	10:59.37	SC/D
6	Jose Duarte	Paraguay	12:34.68	SC/D

=== Semifinals C/D ===
All but the slowest boat in each semi were sent to the C final. The slowest boats were sent to the D final.

==== Semifinal 1 ====
Rank	Rowers	Country	Time	Notes
1	Alejandro Vera	Argentina	11:21.98	FC
2	Takayuki Endo	Japan	11:37.36	FC
3	Manesh Jayakodi	Sri Lanka	12:30.57	FC
4	Jose Duarte	Paraguay	13:41.07	FD

==== Semifinal 2 ====
Rank	Rowers	Country	Time	Notes
1	Shmuel Daniel	Israel	11:08.13	FC
2	Zsolt Peto	Hungary	11:16.45	FC
3	Maksim Miatlou	Belarus	11:31.77	FD

=== Semifinals A/B ===
The three fastest boats in each semi advanced to the A final. The remaining boats were sent to the B final.

==== Semifinal 1 ====
Rank	Rowers	Country	Time	Notes
1	Roman Polianskyi	Ukraine	9:36.45	FA
2	Blake Haxton	United States	9:51.46	FA
3	Andrew Houghton	Great Britain	9:55.62	FA
4	Jaroslaw Kailing	Poland	9:57.68	FB
5	Augustas Navickas	Lithuania	10:20.78	FB
6	Louis Toussaint	Belgium	10:21.49	FB

==== Semifinal 2 ====
Rank	Rowers	Country	Time	Notes
1	Erik Horrie	Australia	9:41.68	FA
2	Alexey Chuvashev	Russia	9:45.29	FA
3	Rene Pereira	Brazil	9:53.39	FA
4	Fabrizio Caselli	Italy	10:07.84	FB
5	Julien Hardi	France	10:35.82	FB
6	Kingsley Okoroafor	Nigeria	10:39.54	FB

=== Finals ===
The A final determined the rankings for places 1 to 6. Additional rankings were determined in the other finals.

==== Final D ====
Rank	Rowers	Country	Time
1	Maksim Miatlou	Belarus	10:56.89
2	Jose Duarte	Paraguay	12:20.65

==== Final C ====
Rank	Rowers	Country	Time
1	Shmuel Daniel	Israel	10:29.80
2	Alejandro Vera	Argentina	10:38.70
3	Takayuki Endo	Japan	10:45.77
4	Zsolt Peto	Hungary	10:51.34
5	Manesh Jayakodi	Sri Lanka	11:59.47

==== Final B ====
Rank	Rowers	Country	Time
1	Jaroslaw Kailing	Poland	10:02.64
2	Fabrizio Caselli	Italy	10:04.43
3	Augustas Navickas	Lithuania	10:15.76
4	Julien Hardi	France	10:16.94
5	Louis Toussaint	Belgium	10:34.72
6	Kingsley Okoroafor	Nigeria	10:39.69

==== Final A ====
Rank	Rowers	Country	Time	Notes
1st place, gold medalist(s)	Erik Horrie	Australia	9:16.90	WB
2nd place, silver medalist(s)	Roman Polianskyi	Ukraine	9:17.36	
3rd place, bronze medalist(s)	Alexey Chuvashev	Russia	9:35.33	
4	Blake Haxton	United States	9:49.98	
5	Rene Pereira	Brazil	9:50.81	
6	Andrew Houghton	Great Britain	10:01.82	
