= Paralympic movement in Tasmania =

Tasmania, an island and state of Australia, has been represented on the Australian Paralympic team since 1980. The greatest number of Tasmanian representatives was four at the 1996 Atlanta Paralympics.

Donald Dann OAM (12 February 1949 - 31 July 2005) was Tasmania's first Paralympian, competing in the 1980 Arnhem Paralympics in the sports of athletics and table tennis.

== Athletes by Games ==
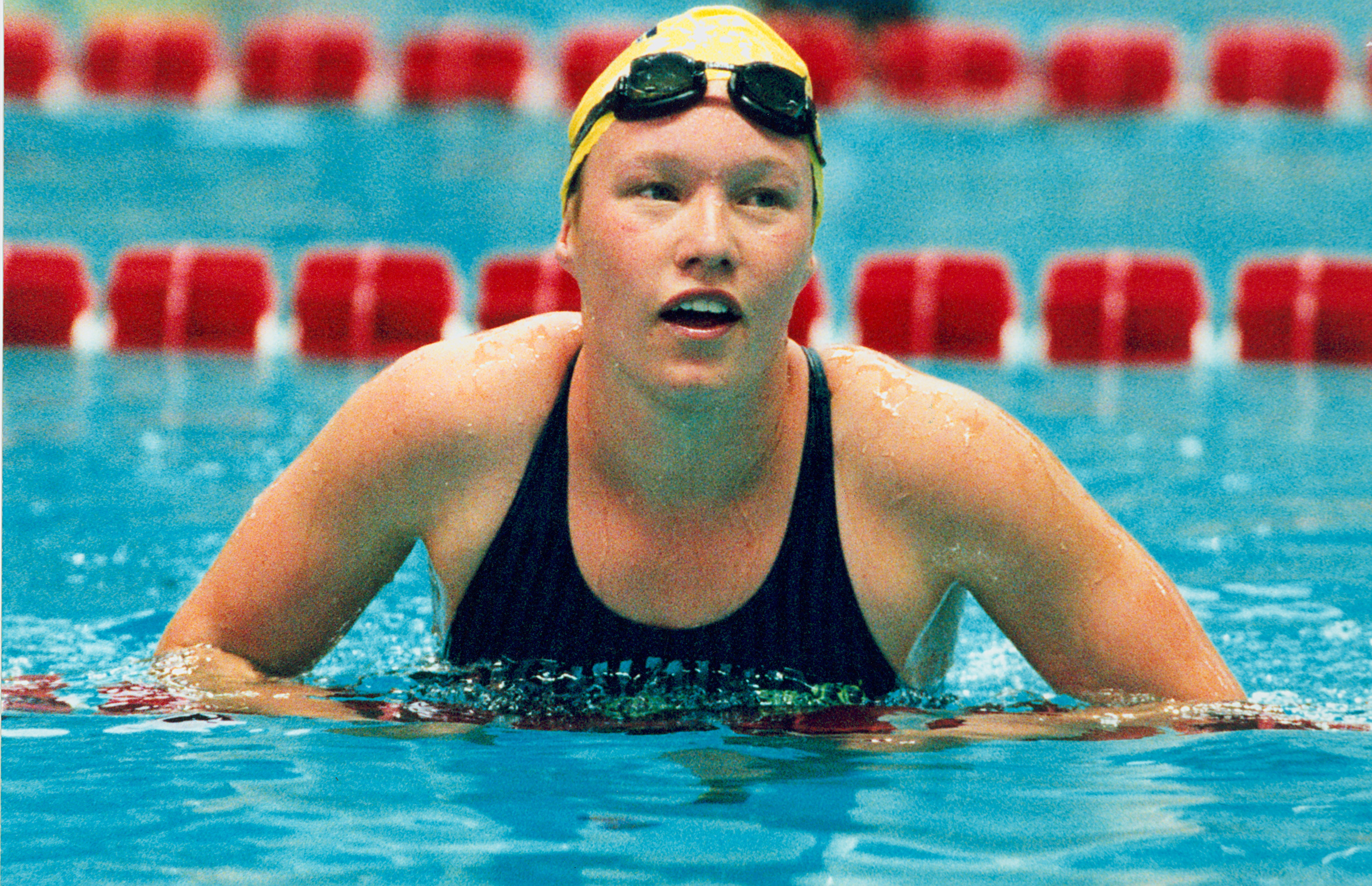
Tasmanian paralympian Melissa Carlton at the 1996 Atlanta Paralympic Games

=== Tokyo 2020 Summer Paralympics ===
- Todd Hodgetts, Athletics
- Deon Kenzie, Athletics

=== Rio de Janeiro 2016 Summer Paralympics ===
- Deon Kenzie, Athletics
- Todd Hodgetts, Athletics
- Matthew Bugg, Sailing

=== London 2012 Summer Paralympics ===
- Matthew Bugg, Sailing
- Todd Hodgetts, Athletics
- Roger Massie, Head Coach Table Tennis

=== Vancouver 2010 Winter Paralympics ===
- Dominic Monypenny, Rowing

=== Beijing 2008 Paralympics ===
- Dominic Monypenny, Rowing

=== Athens 2004 Paralympics ===
In 2004, there were no representatives from Tasmania competing at the Athens Paralympic Games

=== Sydney 2000 Paralympics ===
- Melissa Carlton, Swimming
- Clayton Johnson, Athletics

=== Atlanta 1996 Paralympics ===
- Melissa Carlton, Swimming
- Leroi Court, Athletics
- Brad Thomas, Track and field
- Paul Wiggins, Track and field

=== Barcelona 1992 Paralympics ===
- Brad Thomas, Track and field
- Paul Wiggins, Track and field

=== 1988 Seoul ===
- Brad Thomas, Track and field

=== 1984 Stoke Mandeville / Los Angeles Summer Paralympics ===
- Julie Dowling, Track and field
- Donald Dann, Track and field

=== 1980 Arnhem Paralympics ===
- Donald Dann, Track and field
