= Mahesh Jayakody =

Sri Lankan para-rower

Personal information
- Full name: Mahesh Priyamal Jayakody
- Nationality: Sri Lankan
- Born: 5 October 1987 (age 38)

Sport
- Sport: Paralympic rowing
- Event: single sculls

Mahesh Priyamal Jayakody (born 5 October 1987), also known as Mahesh Jayakodi or Priyamal Jayakodi, is a Sri Lankan a para-rower and a soldier. He made his debut Paralympic appearance representing Sri Lanka at the 2020 Summer Paralympics. He is the first Sri Lankan rower to compete at the Paralympics.

== Education ==
He pursued his primary and secondary education at the Dodangaslanda Central College in Kurunegala.

== Military career ==
Jayakody enlisted in the Sri Lankan Army on 12 February 2007 at the age of 20. Having passed the selection course, he joined the elite Special Forces Regiment. There he represented the Army Special Force Sports Club. He took part in the humanitarian operation in Kokkuvil in 2009 which also turned out to be his last operation. He was critically injured and became paraplegic during the final stages of the Sri Lankan Civil War on 7 April 2009 when he was serving as a staff sergeant of the Army Special Forces Unit in Puthukudiyiruppu. After being injured during the humanitarian operation in 2009, he was admitted to the Army hospital and underwent medical treatment until 2012.

== Sporting career ==
He later pursued his interest in wheelchair dancing after completing his rehabilitation process in 2012. He was encouraged to take up the sport of para-rowing in 2015 by shot put athlete Palitha Bandara and then President of National Paralympic Committee of Sri Lanka Colonel Deepal Herath. Bandara introduced him to rowing coach Lasantha Welikala.

He made his international debut in paralympic rowing in 2017 after undergoing a three-month training stint in China. He participated at the 2018 Para Rowing World Championship and was placed 17th in the men's single sculls event. He claimed a silver medal at the 2019 Asian Para Championships in Bangkok, Thailand. He also became the first Sri Lankan rower to win a medal in an international rowing competition.

He qualified to compete in the men's singles sculls competition at the 2020 Summer Paralympics after winning a gold medal in the PR1 men's singles sculls event at the 2021 Asian Continental Regatta which was held in Tokyo. He eventually became the first ever Sri Lankan rower to qualify for the Paralympics. He was placed sixth in the second preliminary round of the single sculls event with a timing of 11 minutes and 21.3 seconds and qualified to the repechage stage.
