= Eli Nawi =

Israeli Paralympic rower

Personal information
- Native name: אלי נאוי
- Born: 1967 (age 58–59)

Sport
- Country: Israel
Medal record
Event / 1st / 2nd / 3rd; Paralympic Games / 0 / 0 / 1
Representing Israel
Summer Paralympic Games
Rowing
Bronze medal – third place	2008 Beijing	Single Sculls
World Rowing Championship
Bronze medal – third place	2007 Munich	Single Sculls

Eli Nawi (Hebrew: אלי נאוי) is an Israeli Paralympic rower. He made his Paralympics debut in 2008 where he competed in the Men's single sculls competition. Nawi finished the event with a time of five minutes and 39.11 seconds, winning a bronze medal.
