= Rowing at the 2020 Summer Paralympics – Men's single sculls =

Men's single sculls at the XVI Paralympic Games
- Venue: Sea Forest Waterway
- Date: 27 – 29 August 2021
- Competitors: 12 from 12 nations

Medalists
1st place, gold medalist(s)		Roman Polianskyi	Ukraine
2nd place, silver medalist(s)		Erik Horrie	Australia
3rd place, bronze medalist(s)		Renê Pereira	Brazil

The men's single sculls competition at the 2020 Summer Paralympics in Tokyo took place at the Sea Forest Waterway.

== Results ==
=== Heats ===
The winner of each heat qualified to the finals, the remainder went to the repechage.

==== Heat 1 ====
Rank	Lane	Rower	Nation	Time	Notes
1	6	Renê Pereira	Brazil	9:57.59	FA
2	5	Erik Horrie	Australia	10:32.92	R
3	4	Javier Reja Muñoz	Spain	10:38.83	R
4	1	Aleksey Chuvashev	RPC	10:45.64	R
5	2	Marcus Klemp	Germany	11:10.97	R
6	3	Michel Muñoz Malagón	Mexico	11:39.88	R

==== Heat 2 ====
Rank	Lane	Rower	Nation	Time	Notes
1	6	Roman Polianskyi	Ukraine	9:56.47	FA, PB
2	5	Benjamin Pritchard	Great Britain	10:12.24	R
3	2	Shmuel Daniel	Israel	10:22.90	R
4	1	Kingsley Ijomah	Nigeria	11:50.87	R
5	4	Blake Haxton	United States	12:03.03	R
6	3	Mahesh Jayakody	Sri Lanka	12:16.80	R

=== Repechages ===
The first two of each heat qualified to the finals, the remainder went to Final B.

==== Repechage 1 ====
Rank	Lane	Rower	Nation	Time	Notes
1	3	Erik Horrie	Australia	9:20.61	FA
2	4	Shmuel Daniel	Israel	9:28.78	FA
3	5	Marcus Klemp	Germany	9:40.05	FB
4	1	Michel Muñoz Malagón	Mexico	10:16.31	FB
5	2	Kingsley Ijomah	Nigeria	11:15.07	FB

==== Repechage 2 ====
Rank	Lane	Rower	Nation	Time	Notes
1	3	Benjamin Pritchard	Great Britain	9:14.61	FA, PB
2	4	Javier Reja Muñoz	Spain	9:33.42	FA
3	2	Aleksey Chuvashev	RPC	9:47.56	FB
4	5	Blake Haxton	United States	10:28.82	FB
5	1	Mahesh Jayakody	Sri Lanka	11:21.31	FB

=== Finals ===
==== Final B ====
Rank	Lane	Rower	Nation	Time	Notes
7	4	Aleksey Chuvashev	RPC	10:26.99	
8	3	Marcus Klemp	Germany	10:32.27	
9	5	Michel Muñoz Malagón	Mexico	11:25.84	
10	2	Blake Haxton	United States	11:40.29	
11	6	Kingsley Ijomah	Nigeria	12:10.51	
12	1	Mahesh Jayakody	Sri Lanka	13:12.33	

==== Final A ====
Rank	Lane	Rower	Nation	Time	Notes
1st place, gold medalist(s)	1	Roman Polianskyi	Ukraine	9:48.78	
2nd place, silver medalist(s)	4	Erik Horrie	Australia	10:00.82	
3rd place, bronze medalist(s)	2	Renê Pereira	Brazil	10:03.54	
4	6	Javier Reja Muñoz	Spain	10:06.73	
5	3	Benjamin Pritchard	Great Britain	10:06.95	
6	1	Shmuel Daniel	Israel	10:23.02	
