= Tom Aggar =

British rower

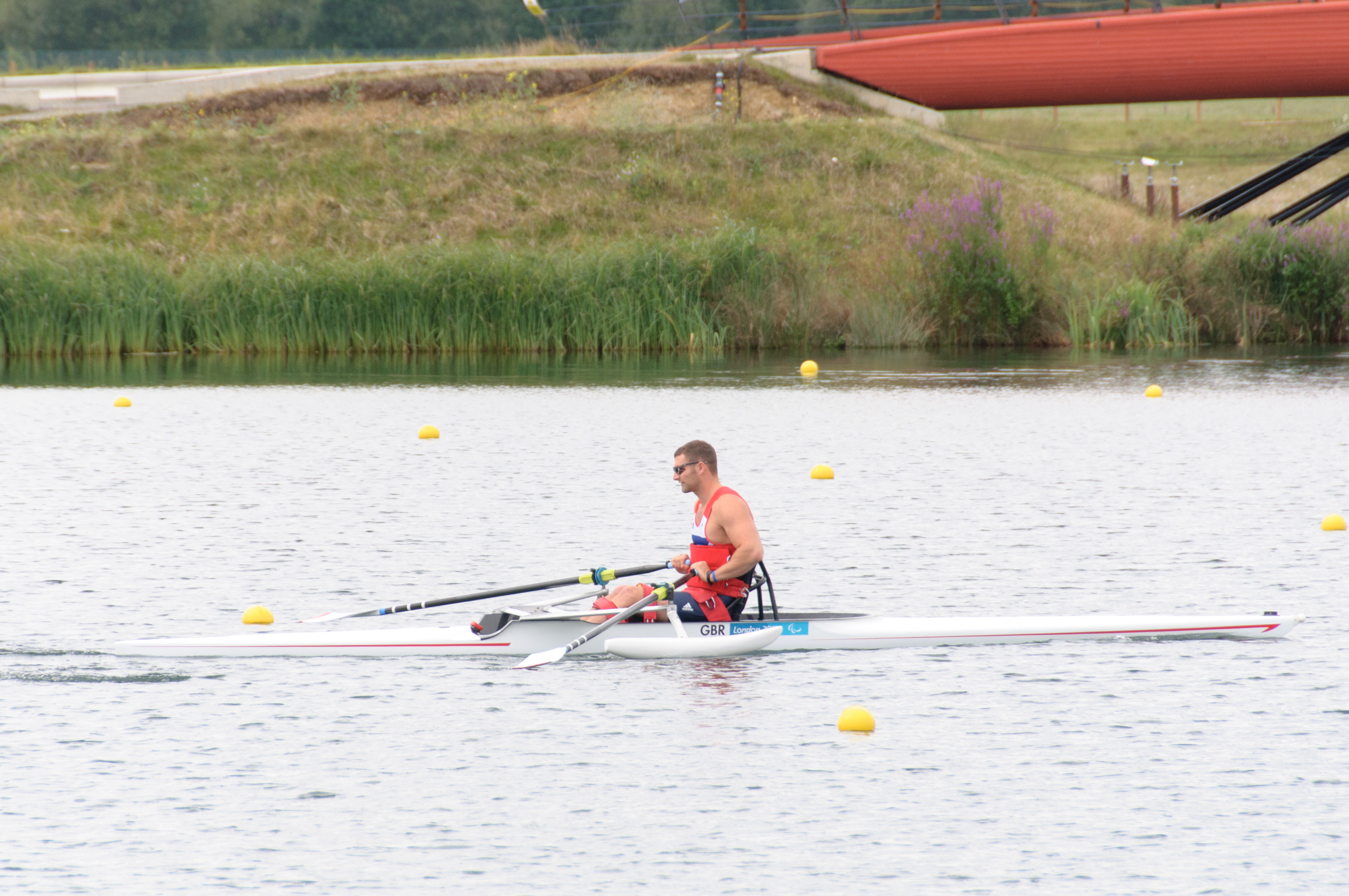

Medal record

Men's para rowing

Representing Great Britain

Paralympic Games
Gold medal – first place	2008 Beijing	Single sculls
Bronze medal – third place	2016 Rio de Janeiro	Singles sculls

World Championships
Gold medal – first place	2007 Munich	Single sculls
Gold medal – first place	2009 Poznań	Single sculls
Gold medal – first place	2010 Karapiro	Single sculls
Gold medal – first place	2011 Bled	Single sculls

Tom Aggar (born 24 May 1984) is a British rower who competed at the 2008 Summer Paralympics.

Aggar went to the University of Warwick where he was a member of the rugby union 1st XV as well as the Saracens F.C. development squad. In 2005, whilst out with a group of friends, he slipped and fell eight feet on to a concrete path. Thinking that he had headed home alone, his friends left. When he regained consciousness two hours later, Aggar phoned for an ambulance. In his fall, he had broken his back and suffered a spinal injury, resulting in paralysis of his legs.

== Rowing ==
Aggar took up rowing as part of the rehabilitation from his injury. He competed at the 2006 National Indoor Championships using a Functional electrical stimulation (FES) rowing machine, where electrical currents are used to activate nerves in parts of the body affected by paralysis. In 2007, at the World Rowing Championships in Munich, Aggar won the gold medal in the 1000 m men's single scull in 5 minutes 13.13 seconds. He beat two-time world champion Dominic Monypenny, of Australia by two seconds and set a new world record in the process.

At the 2008 Paralympic Games in Beijing, China, rowing made its debut appearance at the Games. Aggar won the men's single sculls gold medal in a time of 5 minutes 22.09 seconds. After the Games Aggar was one of the British Paralympic gold medal-winning athletes who were overlooked in the New Year's honours. All of Britain's gold medal winners at the 2008 Summer Olympics were honoured in some way.

In 2009, he defended his World Championship title, winning by 16 seconds ahead of Ukraine's Andrii Kryvchun, in a new world record time of 4 minutes 51.48 seconds. He extended his unbeaten run, winning his fourth successive title in international events, at the 2010 World Championships held at Lake Karapiro, near Cambridge, New Zealand.

== Personal life ==
Aggar and his wife Vicki, a former paralympic rower, have two sons and a daughter.
