= Jacob Wassermann =

Canadian athlete (born 2000)

Personal information
- Full name: Jacob Joseph Wassermann
- Born: January 9, 2000 (age 25) Humboldt, Saskatchewan, Canada
- Education: University of Saskatchewan
- Spouse: Madison Wassermann (m. 2021)

Sport
- Country: Canada
- Sport: Pararowing
- Disability class: PR1

Jacob Joseph Wassermann (born January 9, 2000) is a Canadian pararower and former ice hockey goaltender. Paralyzed from the waist down in 2018 from the Humboldt Broncos bus crash, he represented Canada at the 2024 Summer Paralympics.

== Career ==
=== Ice hockey ===
Wassermann was drafted 8th round (#157 overall) of the 2015 WHL bantam draft by the Regina Pats of the Western Hockey League.

In March 2018, he was named Saskatchewan Junior Hockey League (SJHL) co-rookie of the year alongside Cade Kowalski of the Weyburn Red Wings.

=== Pararowing ===
After being paralyzed from the waist down in the Humboldt Broncos bus crash, Wassermann began trying out adaptive sports, playing adaptive water skiing and sledge hockey before starting a pararowing career in 2022.

The youngest competitor in men's singles B Rowing at the 2024 Summer Paralympics, Wassermann finished tenth in the 2,000 meter distance.
