= Benjamin Pritchard (rower) =

British para-rower (born 1992)

Personal information
- Born: 15 March 1992 (age 34)
- Education: Bangor University - LLB Law

Sport
- Country: Great Britain
- Sport: Para-rowing
- Disability class: PR1
Medal record
Men's para-rowing
Representing Great Britain
Paralympic Games
Gold medal – first place	2024 Paris	PR1 single sculls
World Championships
Gold medal – first place	2025 Shanghai	PR1 single sculls
Gold medal – first place	2026 Amsterdam	PR1 single sculls
Bronze medal – third place	2022 Račice	PR1 single sculls
Bronze medal – third place	2023 Belgrade	PR1 single sculls
European Championships
Gold medal – first place	2025 Plovdiv	PR1 single sculls
Gold medal – first place	2026 Varese	PR1 single sculls
Silver medal – second place	2021 Varese	PR1 single sculls
Bronze medal – third place	2022 Oberschleißheim	PR1 single sculls
Bronze medal – third place	2024 Szeged	PR1 single sculls

Benjamin Pritchard (born 15 March 1992) is a British para-rower. He won the gold medal in the men's PR1 single sculls at the 2024 Summer Paralympics. Pritchard also won gold at the 2025 European Rowing Championships, setting a world record in the process.

Previously he won bronze medals at the 2022 European Rowing Championships and 2022 World Rowing Championships.

Pritchard also competed at the 2020 Summer Paralympics, finishing in fifth place.

In 2025 he was awarded an Honorary Doctorate from Bangor University for contribution to sporting achievements.
