= Huang Cheng =

Chinese Paralympic rower

Huang Cheng (Chinese: 黄成; pinyin: Huáng Chéng; born 1982) is a Chinese paralympic rower. He won the gold medal at the 14th Summer Paralympics at London. He defeated Erik Horrie and Aleksey Chuvashev to clinch gold in the men's single sculls.
