= Dominic Monypenny =

Australian Paralympic rower and skier (born 1960)

Personal information
- Nationality: Australia
- Born: 9 October 1960 (age 65)
Medal record
Paralympic rowing
World Rowing Championships
Gold medal – first place	2005 Gifu	Men's single sculls
Gold medal – first place	2006 Eton Dorney	Men's single sculls
Silver medal – second place	2007 Munich	Men's single sculls

Dominic Monypenny (born 9 October 1960) is an Australian Paralympic rower and skier. He is a two-time world champion in the adaptive fixed seat single-sculls rowing category.

== Personal ==
In 1996 Monypenny fell 30 metres (98 ft) while rock climbing in the Cataract Gorge in Launceston resulting in paraplegia.

After his fall Monypenny continued to remain active in a range of sports including wheelchair tennis and Basketball, wheelchair racing, hand cycling, indoor rock climbing and skiing before concentrating on adaptive rowing.

As a member of the TASRAD Board (Tasmanian Sport and Recreation Association for people with a Disability), Dominic encouraged and mentored many other Tasmanians with disabilities to be active and participate in sports and recreation.

Monypenny holds a PhD in Organic Chemistry and is currently working at Lilydale District High School.

== Summer Paralympics – Competitive Rowing ==
Monypenny took up the sport of rowing in 2003 training with the Tamar Rowing Club. In a short period he was competing both nationally and internationally. At the 2008 Beijing Paralympics, he finished sixth in the Men's Single Sculls AM1x.

== Winter Paralympics – Nordic Skiing ==
Soon after the 2008 Beijing Paralympics, Monypenny switched to Nordic Skiing with the aim of competing in the 2010 Vancouver Winter Paralympics. His first major competition was in January 2009 for the US Nationals. He competed in Vancouver in the Men's 1 km Sprint sitting, Men's 10 km sitting, and Men's 15 km sitting events. At the end of the Games, he announced his retirement from the sport.

== Recognition ==
- 2005 Australian Rower's Rower Award
- 2005 Tasmanian Disabled Sportsperson
- 2006 Tasmanian Disabled Sportsperson
- 2007 Tasmanian Sportsman Award
- 2015 Tasmanian Sporting Hall of Fame inductee

== See also ==
- History of the Paralympic Movement in Tasmania
