= Juan Pablo Barcia =

Spanish rower, powerlifter and wheelchair basketball player

Juan Pablo Barcia Alonso
Personal information
- Nationality: Spanish
- Born: September 1976 (age 49)

Sport
- Country: Spain
- Sport: Rowing; Powerlifting; Wheelchair basketball

Juan Pablo Barcia Alonso (born September 1976) is a Spanish disability rower, powerlifter and wheelchair basketball player. He has won Spanish national championships in powerlifting. He has also represented Spain at the 2012 Summer Paralympics in rowing.

== Personal ==
Barcia was born in September 1976 in Vegadeo, Asturias. In the early 2000s, when he was 26 years old, he was in a car accident that left him with a permanent disability and requiring use of a wheelchair. Prior to his accident, he participated in sports on a casual basis. Following his accident, he tried three sports: powerlifting, wheelchair basketball and rowing. In 2012, he was 36 years old. He played wheelchair basketball for Garmat-Avilés, traveling two days a week to train and then one day a week for the game. As an adaptive powerlifter, he competed in the 2005, 2006, 2007, 2008, 2010 and 2011 Spanish National Championships, finishing first in 2006 and 2008, silver in 2008, 2010, 2011 and a bronze in 2005.

== Rowing ==
Barcia is an ASMx1 classified rower, an athlete who can only move his arms. He took up rowing when recovering from his accident as a form of physical therapy. In 2006, he joined a rowing club in Vegadeo. He took up rowing on very serious basis around that time after learning the sport would be included on the Paralympic programme for the first time in 2008 and he could potentially qualify for the Games. Institutionally, he has had problems because rowing is not widely supported in Spain's sporting institutions and the presence of canoeing on the Paralympic schedule has made things even more difficult. He changes sports from wheelchair basketball, powerlifting and rowing depending on the season.

After less than a year in the sport, Barcia qualified for the 2008 Games. He competed at the 2008 Summer Paralympics, where he was Spain's only rower when the sport made its debut. The Games were his first. He finished in twelfth place. He went into the Games with an injury to his right buttock that impacted on his performance.

Barcia won several races in 2012, including ones in Seville, Trasona and Madrid. In January 2012, he won the national "indoor" rowing championships. In the process, he also improved on his own national record. He won the May 2012 Spanish National Adaptive Rowing Championships, and broke his own national record. In June 2012, he participated in a Rowing World Cup event in Munich where he finished fifth. Barcia took home a first-place finish at the 2012 Spanish National Club Olympic Rowing Championships. In July 2012, following becoming the national championships, a reception was held in his honor at his hometown of Vegadeo's townhall. The event was attended by 200 people. Barcia was Spain's only rowing representative at the 2012 Summer Paralympics, and one of four Spanish sportspeople from Asturias competing in London. He was chosen for London ahead of Edorta de Anta. He qualified for the 1000 meter B Final after posting the fifth best time in the single sculls event. Overall, he finished in ninth place, following his chest strap coming lose 50 meters from the end of the race. Going into London, he had a grueling six week training schedule.

In June 2013, Barcia participated in the Spanish National Club Olympic Rowing Championships, which took place in the Guadalquivir River in Seville. He represented Club Remeros del Eo, and managed a first-place finish competing against three other disability classed rowers. At the 2013 World Championships, he finished eighth after finishing second in a consolidation final. He was one of three Spanish boats competing at the event.
