= Giacomo Perini =

Italian paralympic rower

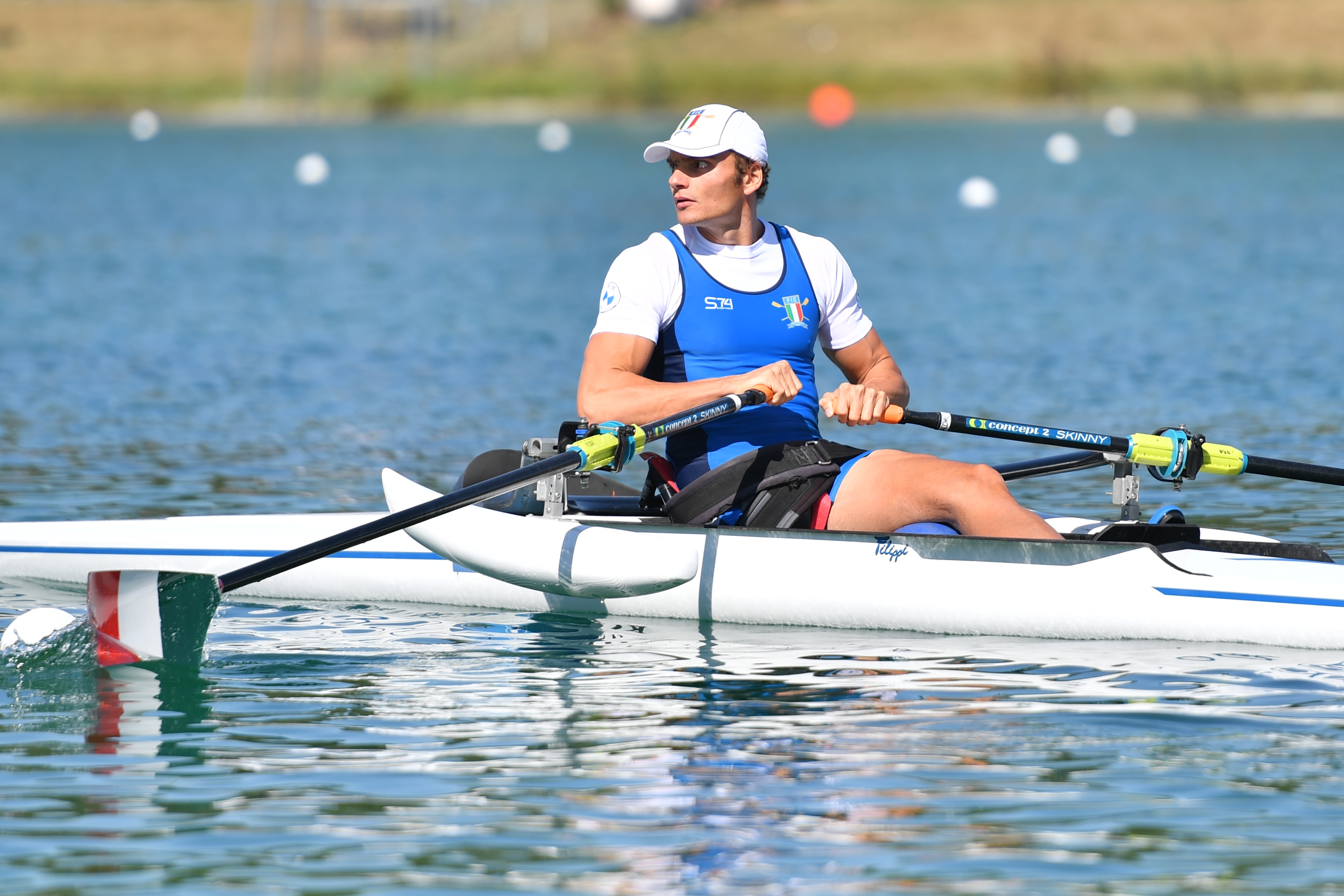

Personal information
- Born: 16 May 1996 (age 30) Rome, Italy

Sport
- Country: Italy
- Sport: Para Rowing
Medal record
Men's pararowing
Representing Italy
Paralympic Games
Bronze medal – third place	2024 Paris	PR1 single sculls
World Championships
Silver medal – second place	2022 Račice	PR1 single sculls
Silver medal – second place	2023 Belgrade	PR1 single sculls
European Championships
Gold medal – first place	2022 Oberschleißheim	PR1 single sculls
Gold medal – first place	2023 Bled	PR1 single sculls
Silver medal – second place	2024 Szeged	PR1 single sculls
Silver medal – second place	2026 Varese	PR1 single sculls
Bronze medal – third place	2025 Plovdiv	PR1 single sculls

Giacomo Perini (born 16 May 1996) is an Italian paralympic rower on the Circolo Canottieri Aniene Paralympic team. He finished fourth at the 2025 World Rowing Championships, held from September 21 to 28, 2025, in Shanghai, and again at the end of May 2025, he won the bronze medal at the European Rowing Championships in Plovdiv. In 2024, he participated in the Paris Paralympic Games, finishing third, but at the end of the race, he was disqualified by the Race Officials for accidentally bringing his smartphone into the boat. He won gold in the men's PR1 single slalom at the 2023 European Championships in Bled, confirming the title he won last year in Munich, beating Paralympic champion Roman Polianskyi by 5.11 seconds and also lowering his existing world record (8.55.21, set last year at the World Cup in Poznan, to 8.55.08) by 13 hundredths of a second. He won the gold medal at the 2022 European Rowing Championships by winning the men's PR1 single scull, finishing with a time of 9'38"48. Also in the 2022 season, he won the silver medal at the World Rowing Championships in Racice[1]. Giacomo Perini, at the age of 18, in his final year of high school and with a great passion for horse riding, suffered a fractured femur following a fall. Admitted to the Rizzoli Hospital in Bologna, he discovered he was suffering from osteosarcoma in his right leg. After treatment with several cycles of chemotherapy due to new relapses, he had to amputate the leg. After the operation, he returned to sport, no longer with horse riding, but with rowing, joining the Italian Paralympic national team in 2017 and in December 2019 he was awarded the title of Knight of the Order of Merit of the Italian Republic. He wrote a book in which he recounted the history of the disease and its rebirth thanks to rowing.[2].
