= Erik Horrie =

Australian adaptive rower and wheelchair basketball player

Erik Horrie OAM
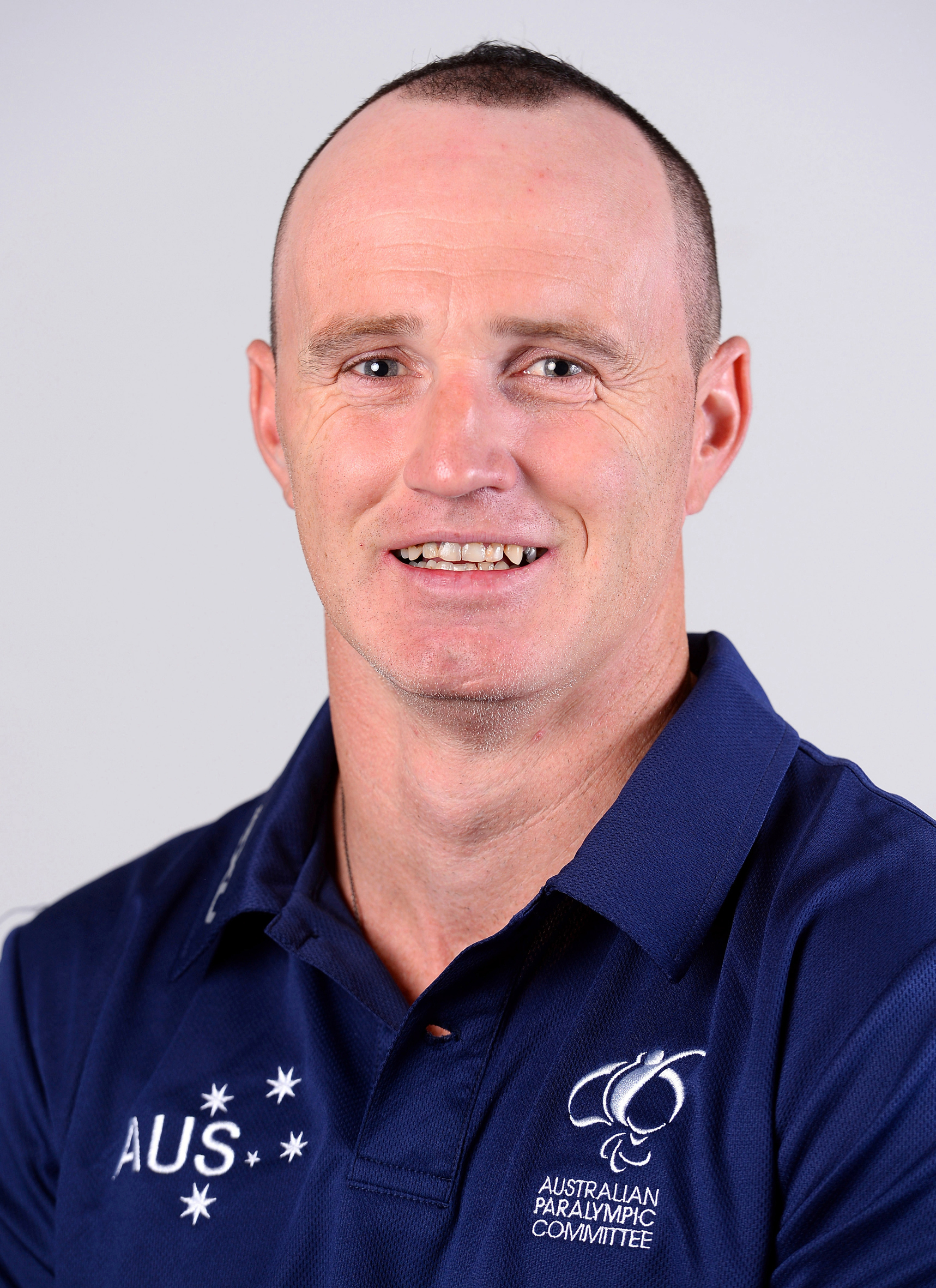
- 2016 Australian Paralympic team portrait of Horrie

Personal information
- Full name: Erik Norman Horrie
- Nationality: Australian
- Born: 17 October 1979 (age 47) New Zealand
- Home town: Penrith, New South Wales, Australia
- Height: 187 cm (6 ft 2 in)
- Weight: 74 kg (163 lb)

Sport
- Country: Australia
- Sport: Para-rowing
- Disability class: PR1
- Club: Sydney Rowing Club
- Coached by: Jason Baker OAM
Medal record
Para-rowing
Representing Australia
Paralympic Games
Silver medal – second place	2012 London	Single Sculls ASM1x
Silver medal – second place	2016 Rio de Janeiro	Single Sculls ASM1x
Silver medal – second place	2020 Tokyo	Single Sculls PR1x
World Championships
Gold medal – first place	2013 Chungju	Single Sculls – ASM1x
Gold medal – first place	2014 Amsterdam	Single Sculls – ASM1x
Gold medal – first place	2015 Aiguebelette	Single Sculls – ASM1x
Gold medal – first place	2017 Sarasota	PR1 single sculls
Gold medal – first place	2018 Plovdiv	PR1 single sculls
Silver medal – second place	2026 Amsterdam	PR1 single sculls
Bronze medal – third place	2011 Bled	Single Sculls- ASM1x
Bronze medal – third place	2019 Linz-Ottensheim	PR1 single sculls
Bronze medal – third place	2025 Shanghai	PR1 single sculls

Erik Norman Horrie OAM (born 17 October 1979) is an Australian wheelchair basketball player and a five-time world champion rower. He was a member of the Australia men's national wheelchair basketball team. Switching to rowing in 2011, he made an immediate impact in the sport, first winning the NSW State Rowing Championships and then the National Rowing Championships in Adelaide. He has won silver medals at the 2012, 2016, 2020 Summer Paralympics and a bronze at the 2024 Summer Paralympics. He won gold medals at the 2013, 2014, 2015, 2017 and 2018 World Rowing Championships. Horrie competed at the 2024 Paris Paralympics - his fourth Games.

== Personal ==
Horrie was born on 17 October 1979 in New Zealand. At the age of seven, he was made a ward of the state due to domestic violence in his home and subsequently spent most of his childhood in foster care homes. In 2001, he was in a motor vehicle accident that left him a paraplegic. As of 2016, he lives in Penrith, New South Wales. In studying youth work, Horrie said "I want to help underprivileged kids because I can relate to what they may be going through. I’m not saying I understand, but hopefully use my experiences to show them they have a choice."

Horrie is married to Michelle and they have three children.

== Sporting career ==
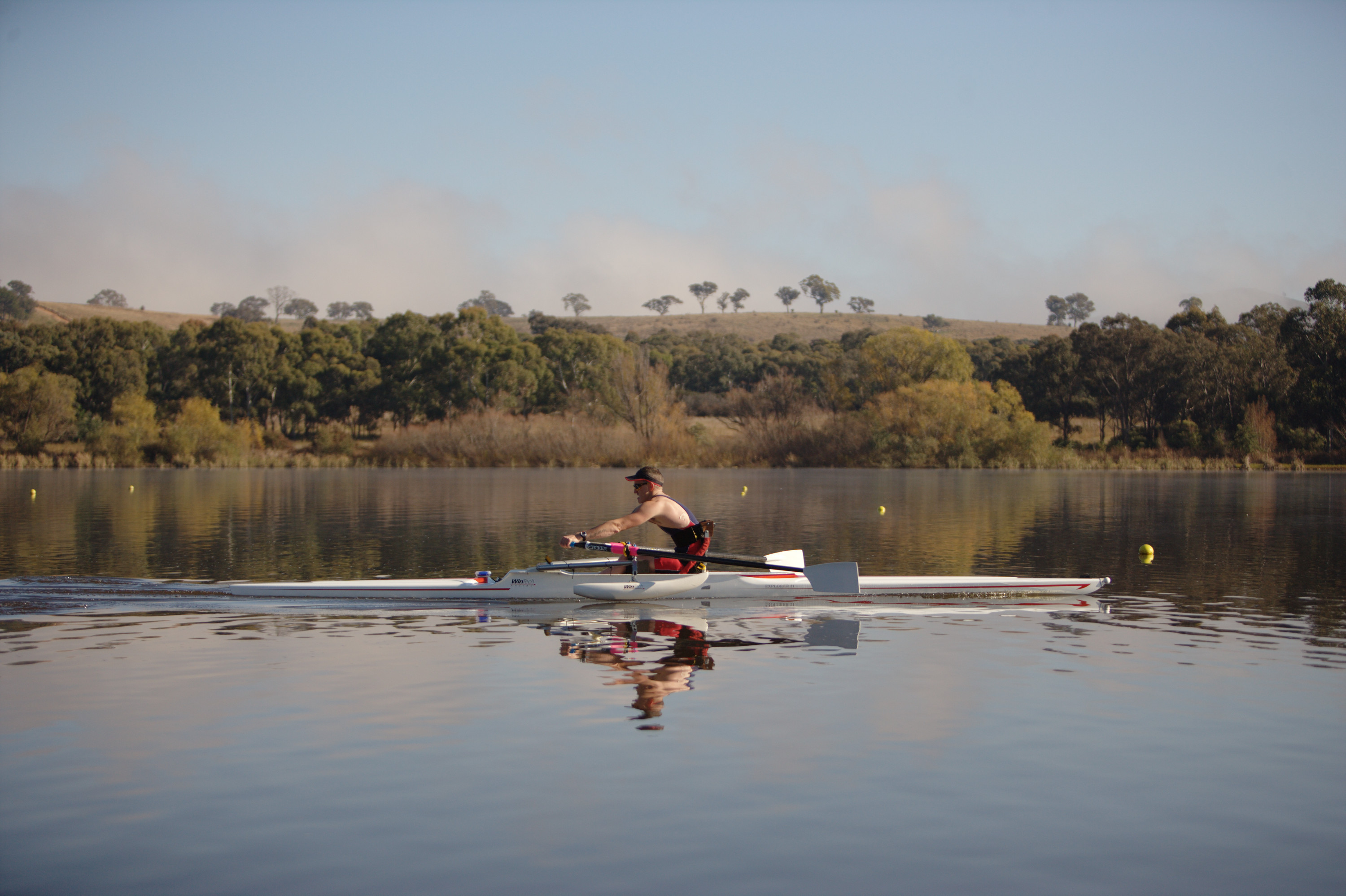
Erik Horrie rowing on the water

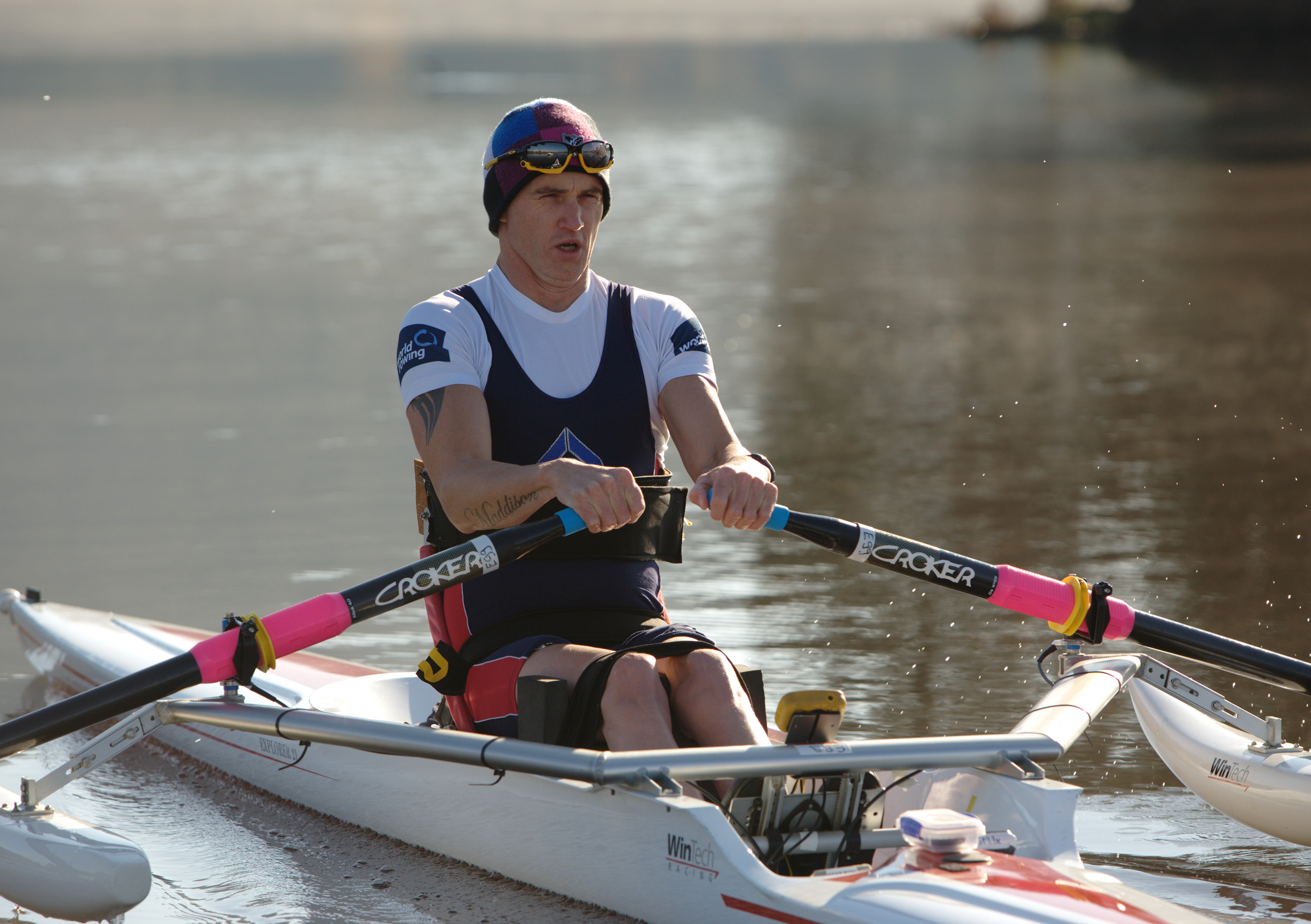
Erik Horrie rowing on the water

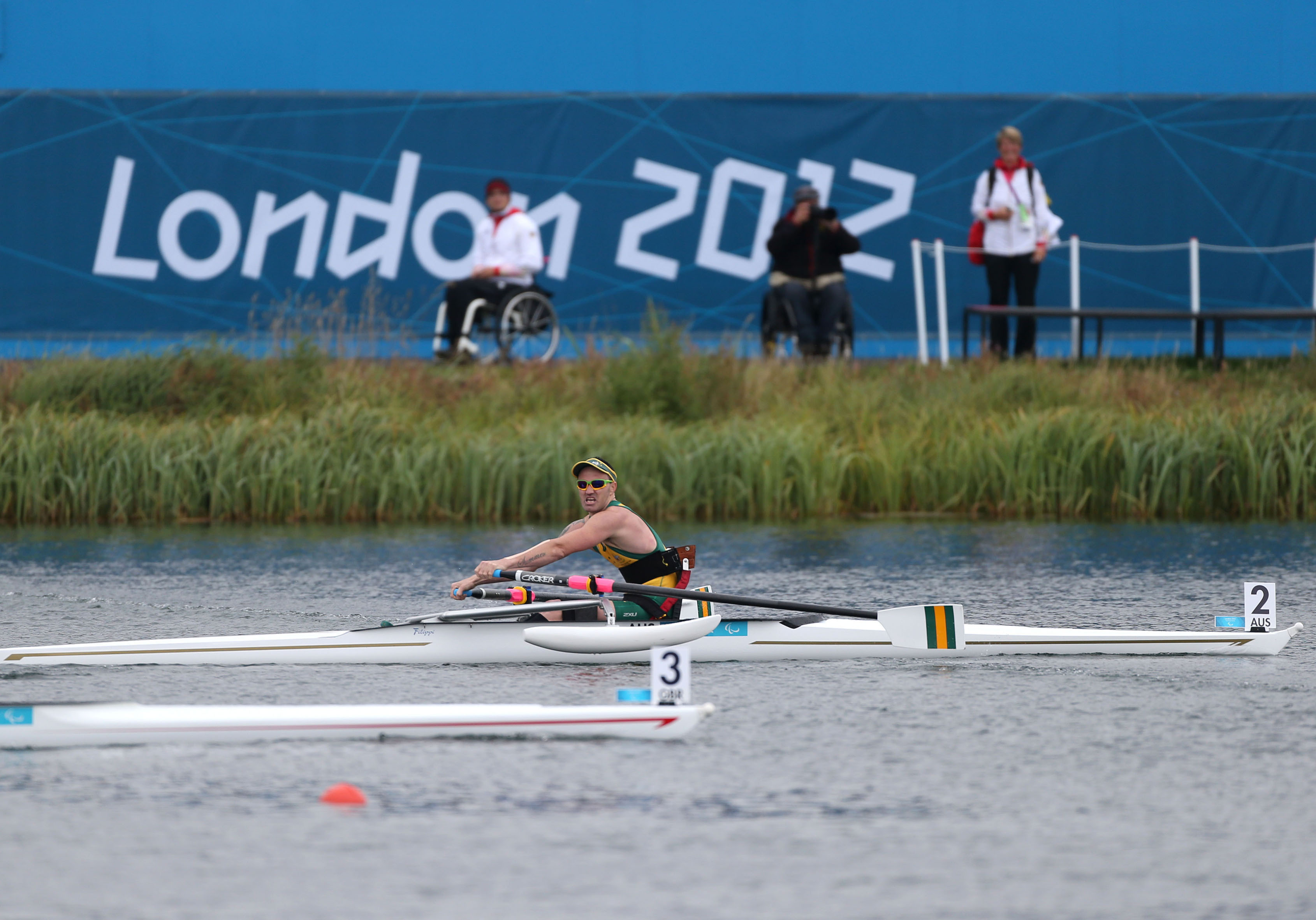
Horrie competing at the 2012 London Paralympics

Basketball

Horrie was classified as a 4 point player. He played in Australia's National Wheelchair Basketball League's Brisbane Spinning Bullets.

He was a member of the Australia men's national wheelchair basketball team. He attempted to make the team for the 2008 Summer Paralympics but did not get selected for the national team until 2009 when he played in the 2009 IBWF AOZ Oceania Championship and the 2009 Rollers World Challenge. Following that, he left the sport.

Rowing

Horrie is classified as an AS rower and is a member of the Dragon Rowing Club. He switched to rowing in 2011 following the 2008 Summer Paralympics after having been identified by a selector from Rowing Australia. In 2011, he did water training Breakfast Creek and off-water training at West End, Queensland. The year, he had a scholarship with the Australian Institute of Sport.

In 2011, he finished first at the New South Wales State Championship. At the 2011 National Rowing Championships in Adelaide, he finished first. In April 2011, he participated in a national team training camp at the Australian Institute of Sport. In the arms, shoulders men's single scull event at the 2011 World Championships in Bled, Slovenia, he finished third. He competed in the 2012 World Rowing Cup 3 event in Germany. He represented Australia at the 2012 Summer Paralympics and he won a silver medal in the Men's Single Sculls – ASM1x.

At the 2013 World Championships in Chungju, Korea, he won a gold medal in the Men's Single Sculls – ASM1x. He was coached by Jason Baker. He won back to back gold medals by winning the Men's Single Sculls – ASM1x at the 2014 World Rowing Championships in Amsterdam, Netherlands.

Horrie won his third consecutive Men's Single Sculls – ASM1x title at the 2015 World Championships in Aiguebelette, France.

At the 2016 Rio Paralympics, he won the silver medal in the Men's Single Sculls – ASM1x. This repeated his result at the London Olympics.

Horrie won his four world championships title in winning the gold medal in the Men's PR1M1x at the 2017 World Rowing Championships in Sarasota, Florida. Horrie won the first PR1 M1x World Championship title raced over 2000 m and, but also set a new world's best time after crossing the line in a time of 9 minutes 39 seconds.

At the 2018 World Rowing Championships in Plovdiv, Bulgaria, he won his fifth consecutive title in the Men's PR1 Men's Single Scull and broke his own World's Best Time, crossing the line in a time of 9 minutes 16.90 seconds, some 8 seconds faster than his previous World Record. Horrie won the bronze medal in the Men's PR1 Men's Single Scull at the 2019 World Rowing Championships in Linz-Ottensheim, Austria. After the race, Horrie said 'It just wasn't my day, but I'm happy to come away with the medal considering the season I’ve had coming back from injury.'

At the 2020 Summer Paralympics, Horrie won his third Paralympic silver medal by finishing second in the Men's Single Sculls, with a time of 10:00.82.

Horrie finished fourth in the Men's PR1 Men's Single Scull at the 2022 World Rowing Championships. Horrie competed at the 2023 World Rowing Championships and made the final Men's PR1 Men's Single Scull by did not start.

At the 2024 Summer Paralympics, he crossed the finish line fourth but a ruling from World Rowing saw third place Italian rower disqualified. Horrie was awarded the bronze medal due to the disqualification of Giacomo Perini. Court of Arbitration for Sport reinstated Perini and Horrie's result was fourth.

Paratriathlon

In 2013, he competed in the first ever paratriathlon held in Australia.

He placed 2nd of 8 male handcycle/wheelchair athletes in the OTU Paratriathlon Oceania Championships in 2014.

== Recognition ==
- 2014–2014 World Rowing Para Rower of the Year.
- 2015 – New South Wales Institute of Sport Male Athlete of the Year.
- 2018 – Rowing Australia Para-rower of the Year
- 2020 – Order of Australia Medal for service to rowing.
- 2021 - Rowing Australia Para-rower of the Year
- 2022 - Rowing Australia Para-rower of the Year
- 2024 - Rowing Australia Male Crew of the Year
- 2026 - Rowing Australia Para Crew of the Year
