= Zsolt Peto =

Serbian table tennis player

Žolt Peto
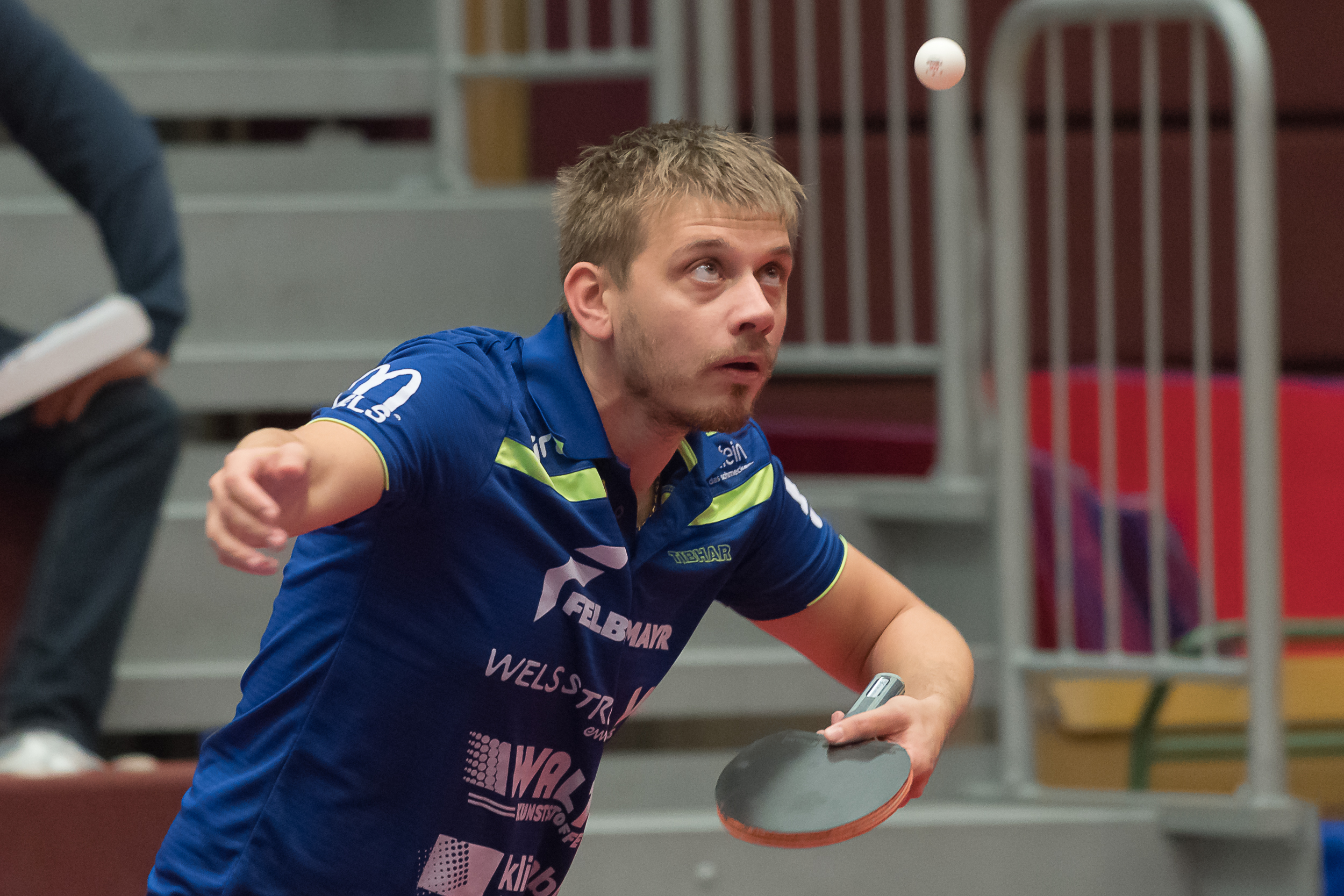
- Peto in Tischtennis Bundesliga 2017-2018

Personal information
- Nationality: Serbia
- Born: 30 November 1987 (age 37) Novi Sad, SR Serbia, SFR Yugoslavia

Sport
- Sport: Table tennis

Zsolt Peto (Serbian: Жолт Пете, romanized: Žolt Pete, Hungarian: Pető Zsolt; born 30 November 1987) is a Serbian table tennis player.

He competed at the 2020 Summer Olympics in men's singles and men's team. He was eliminated in singles in first round by Greek table tennis player Panagiotis Gionis.
