= Renê Pereira =

Brazilian paralympic rower

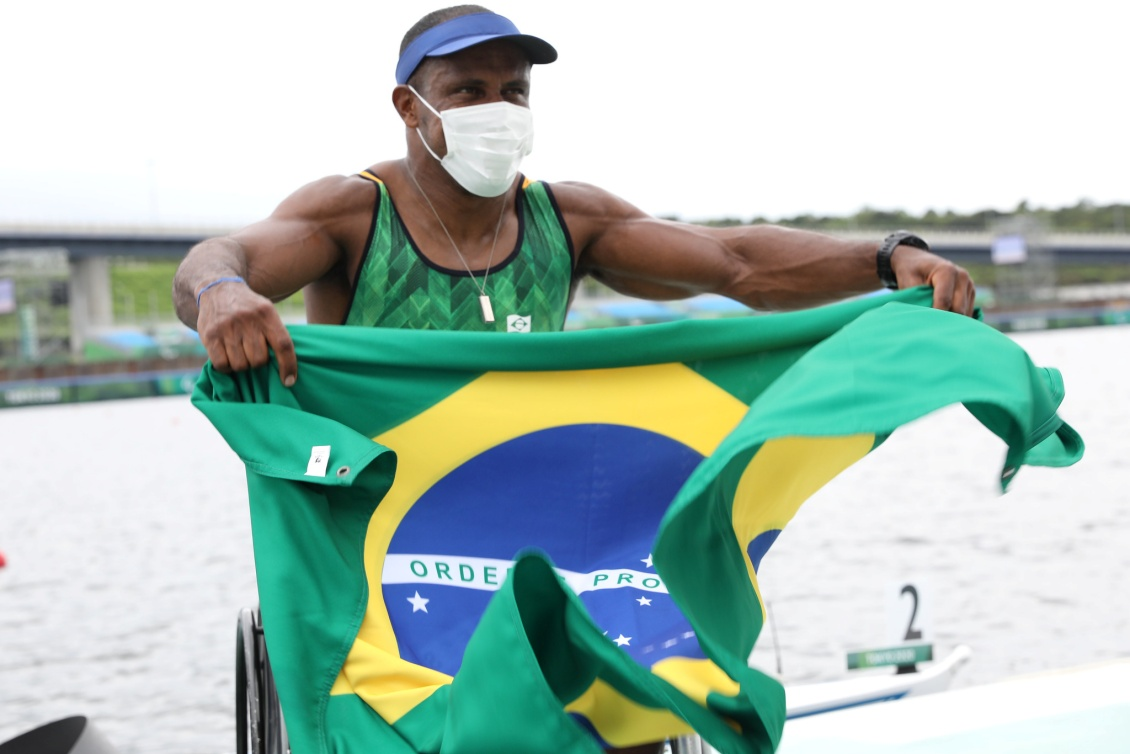
- Pereira at the 2020 Summer Paralympics

Sport
- Country: Brazil
- Sport: Rowing
Medal record
Representing Brazil
Paralympic Games
Rowing
Bronze medal – third place	2020 Tokyo	Men's single sculls

Renê Campos Pereira is a Brazilian paralympic rower. He competed in the men's single sculls at the 2020 Summer Paralympics, winning the bronze medal. Pereira also competed in the rowing at the 2016 Summer Paralympics.
