= Rowing at the 2024 Summer Paralympics =

Rowing at the XVII Paralympic Games
- Paralympic Rowing
- Venue: Vaires-sur-Marne Nautical Stadium
- Dates: 30 August to 1 September 2024
- Competitors: 104 from 29 nations

Rowing at the 2024 Summer Paralympics in Paris, France was held between 30 August to 1 September 2024. It featured men's (PR1M1x) and women's (PR1W1x) single sculls, two mixed double sculls (PR2Mix2x and PR3Mix2x) and one mixed coxed four (PR3Mix4+).

== Qualification ==
An NPC can allocate one boat in each of these events with a maximum of five male and female qualification slots excluding coxswains.

Means of qualification	Date	Venue	PR1M1x	PR1W1x	PR2Mix2x	PR3Mix2x	PR3Mix4+
2023 World Rowing Championships	3–10 September 2023	(Serbia) Belgrade	Australia; Germany; Great Britain; Israel; Italy; Ukraine; Uzbekistan	Argentina; Brazil; China; France; Israel; Norway; Ukraine	China; Great Britain; Ireland; Netherlands; Poland; Ukraine	Australia; France; Germany; Great Britain; United States	Australia; China; France; Germany; Great Britain; United States
Africa Qualification Regatta	23–24 October 2023	(Tunisia) Tunis	Tunisia	Kenya	—N/a	Egypt	—N/a
Americas Qualification Regatta	14–17 March 2024	(Brazil) Rio de Janeiro	Canada	—N/a	—N/a	Mexico	—N/a
Asia/Oceania Qualification Regatta	19–21 April 2024	(South Korea) Chungju	Japan	South Korea	—N/a	India	—N/a
Europe Qualification Regatta	25–28 April 2024	(Hungary) Szeged	Spain	Switzerland	—N/a	—N/a	—N/a
Final Paralympic Qualification Regatta	19–21 May 2024	(Switzerland) Lucerne	France	Uzbekistan	France; Israel	Ukraine	Brazil; Italy
Host country (if applicable)	—N/a	—N/a	—N/a	—N/a	—N/a	—N/a	—N/a
Bipartite Commission Invitation	—N/a	—N/a	—N/a	Sweden (Note: As no qualifier from Americas PQR)	Turkey	Brazil; Thailand (Note: As no qualifier from European PQR)	Spain; South Korea
Total			12	12	9	11	10

== Medal table ==
* Host nation (France)

Rank	NPC	Gold	Silver	Bronze	Total
1	Great Britain	3	1	0	4
2	Israel	1	0	1	2
3	Australia	1	0	0	1
4	China	0	1	0	1
4	Norway	0	1	0	1
4	Ukraine	0	1	0	1
4	United States	0	1	0	1
8	France*	0	0	2	2
9	Germany	0	0	1	1
9	Italy	0	0	1	1
Totals (10 entries)		5	5	5	15

== Medalists ==
Event	Class	Gold	Silver	Bronze
Men's single sculls	PR1	Benjamin Pritchard; Great Britain	Roman Polianskyi; Ukraine	Giacomo Perini; Italy
Women's single sculls	PR1	Moran Samuel; Israel	Birgit Skarstein; Norway	Nathalie Benoit; France
Mixed double sculls	PR2	Great Britain; Lauren Rowles; Gregg Stevenson	China; Liu Shuang; Jiang Jijian	Israel; Shahar Milfelder; Saleh Shahin
Mixed double sculls	PR3	Australia; Nikki Ayers; Jed Altschwager	Great Britain; Sam Murray; Annie Caddick	Germany; Jan Helmich; Hermine Krumbein
Mixed coxed four	PR3	Great Britain; Francesca Allen; Giedrė Rakauskaitė; Josh O'Brien; Ed Fuller; Erin Kennedy (cox)	United States; Skylar Dahl; Gemma Wollenschlaeger; Alex Flynn; Ben Washburne; Emelie Eldracher (cox)	France; Candyce Chafa; Rémy Taranto; Grégoire Bireau; Margot Boulet; Émilie Acquistapace (cox)

== See also ==
- Rowing at the 2024 Summer Olympics
