= Rowing at the 2024 Summer Paralympics – PR3Mix2x =

PR3 Mixed double sculls at the XVII Paralympic Games
- Venue: Vaires-sur-Marne Nautical Stadium
- Date: 30 August – 1 September 2024
- Competitors: 22 from 11 nations
- Winning time: 7:26.74

Medalists
1st place, gold medalist(s)		Nikki Ayers; Jed Altschwager	Australia
2nd place, silver medalist(s)		Samuel Murray; Annie Caddick	Great Britain
3rd place, bronze medalist(s)		Jan Helmich; Hermine Krumbein	Germany

The PR3 Mixed double sculls competition at the 2024 Summer Paralympics in Paris took place at the Vaires-sur-Marne Nautical Stadium. It was the first time this event was contested at the Summer Paralympics.

== Results ==
=== Heats ===
The winner of each heat qualified to the finals, the remainder went to the repechage.

==== Heat 1 ====
Rank	Lane	Rower	Nation	Time	Notes
1	3	Nikki Ayers; Jed Altschwager	Australia	7:11.30	FA, PB
2	6	Guylaine Marchand; Laurent Cadot	France	7:24.25	R
3	5	Dariia Kotyk; Stanislav Samoliuk	Ukraine	7:26.31	R
4	2	Saige Harper; Todd Vogt	United States	7:44.88	R
5	4	Anita; Narayana Konganapalle	India	8:06.84	R
6	1	Chintana Chueasaart; Poramin Phongamthippayakul	Thailand	8:45.92	R

==== Heat 2 ====
Rank	Lane	Rower	Nation	Time	Notes
1	4	Jan Helmich; Hermine Krumbein	Germany	7:12.07	FA
2	1	Samuel Murray; Annie Caddick	Great Britain	7:13.06	R
3	5	Diana Barcelos; Jairo Fröhlich	Brazil	7:40.91	R
4	2	Miguel Nieto; Ángeles Gutiérrez	Mexico	8:19.70	R
5	3	Ali Elzieny; Marwa Abdelaal	Egypt	8:41.23	R

=== Repechages ===
The first two of each heat qualified to the finals, the remainder went to Final B.

==== Repechage 1 ====
Rank	Lane	Rower	Nation	Time	Notes
1	2	Diana Barcelos; Jairo Fröhlich	Brazil	7:24.24	FA
2	3	Guylaine Marchand; Laurent Cadot	France	7:32.90	FA
3	4	Saige Harper; Todd Vogt	United States	7:50.99	FB
4	1	Ali Elzieny; Marwa Abdelaal	Egypt	8:40.09	FB
5	5	Chintana Chueasaart; Poramin Phongamthippayakul	Thailand	8:43.03	FB

==== Repechage 2 ====
Rank	Lane	Rower	Nation	Time	Notes
1	2	Samuel Murray; Annie Caddick	Great Britain	7:20.53	FA
2	3	Dariia Kotyk; Stanislav Samoliuk	Ukraine	7:29.24	FA
3	4	Anita; Narayana Konganapalle	India	7:54.33	FB
4	1	Miguel Nieto; Ángeles Gutiérrez	Mexico	8:10.54	FB

=== Finals ===
==== Final B ====
Rank	Lane	Rower	Nation	Time	Notes
7	3	Saige Harper; Todd Vogt	United States	7:48.38	
8	2	Anita; Narayana Konganapalle	India	8:16.96	
9	4	Miguel Nieto; Ángeles Gutiérrez	Mexico	8:28.23	
10	1	Ali Elzieny; Marwa Abdelaal	Egypt	8:47.99	
11	5	Chintana Cheuasaart; Poramin Phongamthippayakul	Thailand	8:48.81	

==== Final A ====
Rank	Lane	Rower	Nation	Time	Notes
1st place, gold medalist(s)	4	Nikki Ayers; Jed Altschwager	Australia	7:26.74	
2nd place, silver medalist(s)	5	Samuel Murray; Annie Caddick	Great Britain	7:28.19	
3rd place, bronze medalist(s)	3	Jan Helmich; Hermine Krumbein	Germany	7:28.31	
4	6	Dariia Kotyk; Stanislav Samoliuk	Ukraine	7:42.50	
5	2	Diana Barcelos; Jairo Fröhlich	Brazil	7:45.02	
6	1	Guylaine Marchand; Laurent Cadot	France	7:51.94	
