= 2025 World Rowing Championships – PR3 Mixed double sculls =

PR3 Mixed double sculls at the 2025 World Rowing Championships
- Venue: Dianshan Lake
- Location: Shanghai, China
- Dates: 25–28 September
- Competitors: 26 from 13 nations
- Winning time: 6:58.64

Medalists
gold medal	Valentin Luz; Kathrin Marchand	Germany
silver medal	Stanislav Samoliuk; Dariia Kotyk	Ukraine
bronze medal	Lisa Greissl; Sam Stunell	Australia

The PR3 mixed double sculls competition at the 2025 World Rowing Championships took place at Dianshan Lake, in Shanghai.

== Schedule ==
The schedule was as follows:

Date	Time	Round
Thursday, 25 September 2025	10:58	Heats
Friday, 26 September 2025	13:03	Semifinals
Sunday, 28 September 2025	13:05	Final B
Sunday, 28 September 2025	14:05	Final A

All times are UTC+08:00

== Results ==
=== Heats ===
The two fastest boats in each heat and the six fastest times advanced to the semifinals. The remaining boat eliminated.

==== Heat 1 ====
Rank	Rower	Country	Time	Notes
1	Lisa Greissl; Sam Stunell	Australia	7:49.49	SF
2	Diana Cristina Barcelos de Oliveira; Valdeni da Silva Junior	Brazil	8:00.29	SF
3	Dinara Belyanina; Akbarali Abduvaliev	Uzbekistan	8:05.15	SF
4	Elisa Corda; Luca Conti	Italy	8:24.79	SF
5	Ayako Takano; Ryota Seto	Japan	9:13.53	SF

==== Heat 2 ====
Rank	Rower	Country	Time	Notes
1	Samuel Murray; Annabel Caddick	Great Britain	7:48.04	SF
2	Stanislav Samoliuk; Dariia Kotyk	Ukraine	7:53.57	SF
3	Daniel Diaz Alcaide; Josefa Benítez	Spain	8:48.22	SF
4	Pablo Ramírez Lemus; Ángeles Britani Gutiérrez Vieyra	Mexico	9:22.80	

==== Heat 3 ====
Rank	Rower	Country	Time	Notes
1	Valentin Luz; Kathrin Marchand	Germany	7:41.49	SF
2	Eva David; Laurent Cadot	France	7:57.08	SF
3	Anna Piskunova; Anton Voronov	Individual Neutral Athletes	8:00.26	SF
4	Anita Anita; Narayana Konganapalle	India	9:02.14	SF

=== Semifinals ===
The three fastest boats in each heat advance to the Final A. The remaining boats were sent to the Final B.

==== Semifinal 1 ====
Rank	Rower	Country	Time	Notes
1	Valentin Luz; Kathrin Marchand	Germany	7:23.10	FA
2	Stanislav Samoliuk; Dariia Kotyk	Ukraine	7:28.01	FA
3	Eva David; Laurent Cadot	France	7:35.92	FA
4	Dinara Belyanina; Akbarali Abduvaliev	Uzbekistan	7:51.19	FB
5	Elisa Corda; Luca Conti	Italy	8:01.78	FB
6	Ayako Takano; Ryota Seto	Japan	8:44.07	FB

==== Semifinal 2 ====
Rank	Rower	Country	Time	Notes
1	Samuel Murray; Annabel Caddick	Great Britain	7:24.11	FA
2	Lisa Greissl; Sam Stunell	Australia	7:26.81	FA
3	Anna Piskunova; Anton Voronov	Individual Neutral Athletes	7:31.90	FA
4	Diana Cristina Barcelos de Oliveira; Valdeni da Silva Junior	Brazil	7:54.29	FB
5	Daniel Diaz Alcaide; Josefa Benítez	Spain	8:18.92	FB
6	Anita Anita; Narayana Konganapalle	India	8:23.48	FB

=== Finals ===
The A final determined the rankings for places 1 to 6. Additional rankings were determined in the other finals.

==== Final B ====
Rank	Rower	Country	Time	Total rank
1	Dinara Belyanina; Akbarali Abduvaliev	Uzbekistan	7:43.90	7
2	Diana Cristina Barcelos de Oliveira; Valdeni da Silva Junior	Brazil	7:49.36	8
3	Elisa Corda; Luca Conti	Italy	7:56.13	9
4	Daniel Diaz Alcaide; Josefa Benítez	Spain	8:18.05	10
5	Anita Anita; Narayana Konganapalle	India	8:18.22	11
6	Ayako Takano; Ryota Seto	Japan	8:48.06	12

==== Final A ====
Rank	Rower	Country	Time	Notes
1st place, gold medalist(s)	Valentin Luz; Kathrin Marchand	Germany	6:58.64	WB
2nd place, silver medalist(s)	Stanislav Samoliuk; Dariia Kotyk	Ukraine	7:05.33	
3rd place, bronze medalist(s)	Lisa Greissl; Sam Stunell	Australia	7:06.60	
4	Samuel Murray; Annabel Caddick	Great Britain	7:09.41	
5	Anna Piskunova; Anton Voronov	Individual Neutral Athletes	7:12.26	
6	Eva David; Laurent Cadot	France	7:17.23	
