= 2023 World Rowing Championships – PR3 Mixed double sculls =

PR3 Mixed double sculls at the 2023 World Rowing Championships
- Venue: Lake Sava
- Location: Belgrade, Serbia
- Dates: 4 September – 8 September
- Competitors: 22 from 11 nations
- Winning time: 8:07.07

Medalists
gold medal	Nikki Ayers; Jed Altschwager	Australia
silver medal	Gemma Wollenschlaeger; Todd Vogt	United States
bronze medal	Elur Alberdi; Laurent Cadot	France

The PR3 mixed double sculls competition at the 2023 World Rowing Championships took place at Lake Sava, in Belgrade.

== Schedule ==
The schedule was as follows:

Date	Time	Round
Monday 4 September 2023	09:30	Heats
Wednesday 6 September 2023	10:50	Repechages
Friday 8 September 2023	13:37	Final B
Friday 8 September 2023	14:49	Final A

All times are Central European Summer Time (UTC+2)

== Results ==
=== Heats ===
The fastest boats in each heat advanced directly to the Final A. The remaining boats were sent to the repechages.

==== Heat 1 ====
Rank	Rower	Country	Time	Notes
1	Elur Alberdi; Laurent Cadot	France	7:33.75	FA
2	Annabel Caddick; Samuel Murray	Great Britain	7:34.27	R
3	Stanislav Samoliuk; Dariia Kotyk	Ukraine	7:44.47	R
4	Shay-Lee Mizrachi; Achiya Klein	Israel	7:51.16	R
5	Anita Anita; Narayana Konganapalle	India	8:11.35	R
6	Elisa Corda; Daniele Stefanoni	Italy	8:24.42	R

==== Heat 2 ====
Rank	Rower	Country	Time	Notes
1	Nikki Ayers; Jed Altschwager	Australia	7:20.93	FA
2	Valentin Luz; Hermine Krumbein	Germany	7:25.90	R
3	Gemma Wollenschlaeger; Todd Vogt	United States	7:26.42	R
4	Diana Barcelos de Oliveira; Jairo Klug	Brazil	7:35.92	R
5	Liliana Gallo Flores; Pablo Ramírez Lemus	Mexico	8:52.88	R

=== Repechages ===
The two fastest boats in each heat advanced directly to the final A. The remaining boats were sent to the final B.

==== Repechage 1 ====
Rank	Rower	Country	Time	Notes
1	Gemma Wollenschlaeger; Todd Vogt	United States	7:32.26	FA
2	Annabel Caddick; Samuel Murray	Great Britain	7:42.38	FA
3	Shay-Lee Mizrachi; Achiya Klein	Israel	7:52.36	FB
4	Elisa Corda; Daniele Stefanoni	Italy	8:31.03	FB
5	Liliana Gallo Flores; Pablo Ramírez Lemus	Mexico	8:56.06	FB

==== Repechage 2 ====
Rank	Rower	Country	Time	Notes
1	Diana Barcelos de Oliveira; Jairo Klug	Brazil	7:31.07	FA
2	Valentin Luz; Hermine Krumbein	Germany	7:31.19	FA
3	Stanislav Samoliuk; Dariia Kotyk	Ukraine	7:33.49	FB
4	Anita Anita; Narayana Konganapalle	India	8:07.98	FB

=== Finals ===
The A final determined the rankings for places 1 to 6. Additional rankings were determined in the other finals.

==== Final B ====
Rank	Rower	Country	Time	Total rank
1	Stanislav Samoliuk; Dariia Kotyk	Ukraine	8:49.29	7
2	Shay-Lee Mizrachi; Achiya Klein	Israel	9:06.80	8
3	Anita Anita; Narayana Konganapalle	India	9:36.22	9
4	Elisa Corda; Daniele Stefanoni	Italy	9:53.36	10
5	Liliana Gallo Flores; Pablo Ramírez Lemus	Mexico	10:44.81	11

==== Final A ====
Rank	Rower	Country	Time
1st place, gold medalist(s)	Nikki Ayers; Jed Altschwager	Australia	8:07.07
2nd place, silver medalist(s)	Gemma Wollenschlaeger; Todd Vogt	United States	8:15.22
3rd place, bronze medalist(s)	Elur Alberdi; Laurent Cadot	France	8:27.09
4	Annabel Caddick; Samuel Murray	Great Britain	8:29.59
5	Valentin Luz; Hermine Krumbein	Germany	8:33.80
6	Diana Barcelos de Oliveira; Jairo Klug	Brazil	8:43.74
