= 2026 World Rowing Championships – PR3 Mixed coxed four =

PR3 Mixed coxed four at the 2026 World Rowing Championships
- Venue: Bosbaan
- Location: Amsterdam, Netherlands
- Dates: 25–27 August
- Competitors: 50 from 10 nations
- Winning time: 6:46.60

Medalists
gold medal	Gabriella Bigler; Skylar Dahl; Maxwell Allemeier; Alex Flynn; Hannah Diaz	United States
silver medal	Francesca Allen; Charlotte Coburn; Jonty Ridley; Joshua O'Brien; Omar Al-Miqdadi	Great Britain
bronze medal	Eva David; Helene Balzac; Grégoire Bireau; Laurent Cadot; Maiwenn Dumont	France

The PR3 mixed coxed four competition at the 2026 World Rowing Championships took place at Bosbaan, in Amsterdam.

== Schedule ==
The schedule was as follows:

Date	Time	Round
Tuesday 25 August 2026	14:26	Heats
Thursday, 27 August 2026	15:06	Final B
Thursday, 27 August 2026	18:40	Final A

All times are Central European Summer Time (UTC+2)

== Results ==
=== Heats ===
The two fastest boats in each heat and the two fastest times advanced to the Final A. Other crews to Final B.

==== Heat 1 ====
Rank	Rower	Country	Time	Notes
1	Gabriella Bigler; Skylar Dahl; Maxwell Allemeier; Alex Flynn; Hannah Diaz (F) (c)	United States	7:50.82	FA
2	Martina Osualdini; Carolina Foresti; Marco Frank; Stanislau Litvinchuk; Chiara Reto (F) (c)	Italy	7:57.59	FA
3	Rano Jumabayeva; Mehribon Boyeva; Madi Suleymanov; Abdumutal Abdurakhmonov; Amalbek Mustafakulov (M) (c)	Uzbekistan	8:25.01	FB
4	Angel Santos Moraes; Marcela Teixeira da Silva; Erik Matheus da Silva Lima; Gabriel Mendes de Souza; Jucelino da Silva (M) (c)	Brazil	8:29.38	FB
5	Rocio Fraguela Moas; Elur Alberdi; Marc Vila Santin; Daniel Díaz Alcaide; Ainoa Masana Pérez (F) (c)	Spain	8:52.13	FB

==== Heat 2 ====
Rank	Rower	Country	Time	Notes
1	Francesca Allen; Charlotte Coburn; Jonty Ridley; Joshua O'Brien; Omar Al-Miqdadi (M) (c)	Great Britain	7:51.46	FA
2	Eva David; Helene Balzac; Grégoire Bireau; Laurent Cadot; Maiwenn Dumont (F) (c)	France	7:54.17	FA
3	Susannah Lutze; Tobiah Goffsassen; Cormac Hayes; Wallis Russell; Hannah Cowap (F) (c)	Australia	7:55.23	FA
4	Hermine Krumbein; Jan Helmich; Daniel Müller-Groß; Susanne Lackner; Till Martini (M) (c)	Germany	8:08.63	FA
5	Toshihiro Nishioka; Nagisa Ikegami; Ayako Takano; Ryohei Ariyasu; Yasuyuki Kimachi (M) (c)	Japan	9:06.15	FB

=== Finals ===
The A final determined the rankings for places 1 to 6. Additional rankings were determined in the other finals.

==== Final B ====
Rank	Rower	Country	Time	Total rank
1	Angel Santos Moraes; Marcela Teixeira da Silva; Erik Matheus da Silva Lima; Gabriel Mendes de Souza; Jucelino da Silva (M) (c)	Brazil	8:11.27	7
2	Rano Jumabayeva; Mehribon Boyeva; Madi Suleymanov; Abdumutal Abdurakhmonov; Amalbek Mustafakulov (M) (c)	Uzbekistan	8:14.86	2
3	Rocio Fraguela Moas; Elur Alberdi; Marc Vila Santin; Daniel Díaz Alcaide; Ainoa Masana Pérez (F) (c)	Spain	8:28.42	9
4	Toshihiro Nishioka; Nagisa Ikegami; Ayako Takano; Ryohei Ariyasu; Yasuyuki Kimachi (M) (c)	Japan	8:35.99	10

==== Final A ====
Rank	Rower	Country	Time
1st place, gold medalist(s)	Gabriella Bigler; Skylar Dahl; Maxwell Allemeier; Alex Flynn; Hannah Diaz (F) (c)	United States	6:46.60
2nd place, silver medalist(s)	Francesca Allen; Charlotte Coburn; Jonty Ridley; Joshua O'Brien; Omar Al-Miqdadi (M) (c)	Great Britain	6:47.87
3rd place, bronze medalist(s)	Eva David; Helene Balzac; Grégoire Bireau; Laurent Cadot; Maiwenn Dumont (F) (c)	France	6:50.73
4	Martina Osualdini; Carolina Foresti; Marco Frank; Stanislau Litvinchuk; Chiara Reto (F) (c)	Italy	6:52.34
5	Susannah Lutze; Tobiah Goffsassen; Cormac Hayes; Wallis Russell; Hannah Cowap (F) (c)	Australia	6:56.03
6	Hermine Krumbein; Jan Helmich; Daniel Müller-Groß; Susanne Lackner; Till Martini (M) (c)	Germany	7:23.37
