= 2023 World Rowing Championships – PR3 Mixed coxed four =

PR3 Mixed coxed four at the 2023 World Rowing Championships
- Venue: Lake Sava
- Location: Belgrade, Serbia
- Dates: 4 September – 9 September
- Competitors: 50 from 10 nations
- Winning time: 7:22.20

Medalists
gold medal	Francesca Allen; Morgan Fice-Noyes; Giedrė Rakauskaitė; Edward Fuller; Erin Kennedy	Great Britain
silver medal	Skylar Dahl; Saige Harper; Alex Flynn; Benjamin Washburne; Emelie Eldracher	United States
bronze medal	Susanne Lackner; Jan Helmich; Marc Lembeck; Kathrin Marchand; Inga Thöne	Germany

The PR3 mixed coxed four competition at the 2023 World Rowing Championships took place at Lake Sava, in Belgrade.

== Schedule ==
The schedule was as follows:

Date	Time	Round
Monday 4 September 2023	10:42	Heats
Tuesday 5 September 2023	11:19	Repechages
Saturday 9 September 2023	11:00	Final B
Saturday 9 September 2023	13:18	Final A

All times are Central European Summer Time (UTC+2)

== Results ==
=== Heats ===
The two fastest boats in each heat advanced directly to the Final A. The remaining boats were sent to the repechage.

==== Heat 1 ====
Rank	Rower	Country	Time	Notes
1	Susanne Lackner; Jan Helmich; Marc Lembeck; Kathrin Marchand; Inga Thöne (c)	Germany	7:13.46	FA
2	Erika Sauzeau; Rémy Taranto; Gregoire Bireau; Margot Boulet; Émilie Acquistapace (c)	France	7:15.89	FA
3	Wang Xixi; Zeng Wanbin; Wu Yunlong; Jiang Lingtao; Yu Li (c)	China	7:18.31	R
4	Luca Conti; Tommaso Schettino; Carolina Foresti; Greta Muti; Raissa Scionico (c)	Italy	7:25.85	R
5	Josefa Benítez; Mario Lopez Barredo; Saul Peña Puente; Veronica Rodriguez Pulido; Leonor Garcia (c)	Spain	8:20.07	R

==== Heat 2 ====
Rank	Rower	Country	Time	Notes
1	Francesca Allen; Morgan Fice-Noyes; Giedrė Rakauskaitė; Edward Fuller; Erin Kennedy (c)	Great Britain	7:07.29	FA
2	Skylar Dahl; Saige Harper; Alex Flynn; Benjamin Washburne; Emelie Eldracher (c)	United States	7:13.06	FA
3	Susannah Lutze; Jessica Gallagher; Harrison Nichols; Thomas Birtwhistle; Teesaan Koo (c)	Australia	7:20.76	R
4	Kang Hyoun-joo; Bae Ji-in; Kang I-seong; Lee Seung-ho; Kim Su-hyun (c)	South Korea	8:20.85	R
5	María Xóchitl Cristóbal Aquino; Claudia García Evangelista; Benjamin Roman Barrios; Hector Arriaga Chavez; Montserrat Ramos (c)	Mexico	8:56.68	R

=== Repechage ===
The two fastest boats in each heat advanced directly to the Final A. The remaining boats were sent to the Final B.

Rank	Rower	Country	Time	Notes
1	Susannah Lutze; Jessica Gallagher; Harrison Nichols; Thomas Birtwhistle; Teesaan Koo (c)	Australia	6:59.29	FA
2	Wang Xixi; Zeng Wanbin; Wu Yunlong; Jiang Lingtao; Yu Li (c)	China	7:06.54	FA
3	Luca Conti; Tommaso Schettino; Carolina Foresti; Greta Muti; Raissa Scionico (c)	Italy	7:10.12	FB
4	Kang Hyoun-joo; Bae Ji-in; Kang I-seong; Lee Seung-ho; Kim Su-hyun (c)	South Korea	7:47.23	FB
5	Josefa Benítez; Mario Lopez Barredo; Saul Peña Puente; Veronica Rodriguez Pulido; Leonor Garcia (c)	Spain	7:58.42	FB
6	María Xóchitl Cristóbal Aquino; Claudia García Evangelista; Benjamin Roman Barrios; Hector Arriaga Chavez; Montserrat Ramos (c)	Mexico	8:26.05	FB

=== Finals ===
The A final determined the rankings for places 1 to 6. Additional rankings were determined in the other finals.

==== Final B ====
Rank	Rower	Country	Time	Total rank
1	Luca Conti; Tommaso Schettino; Carolina Foresti; Greta Muti; Raissa Scionico (c)	Italy	7:22.04	7
2	Kang Hyoun-joo; Bae Ji-in; Kang I-seong; Lee Seung-ho; Kim Su-hyun (c)	South Korea	7:46.97	8
3	Josefa Benítez; Mario Lopez Barredo; Saul Peña Puente; Veronica Rodriguez Pulido; Leonor Garcia (c)	Spain	8:03.42	9
4	María Xóchitl Cristóbal Aquino; Claudia García Evangelista; Benjamin Roman Barrios; Hector Arriaga Chavez; Montserrat Ramos (c)	Mexico	8:35.00	10

==== Final A ====
Rank	Rower	Country	Time
1st place, gold medalist(s)	Francesca Allen; Morgan Fice-Noyes; Giedrė Rakauskaitė; Edward Fuller; Erin Kennedy (c)	Great Britain	7:22.20
2nd place, silver medalist(s)	Skylar Dahl; Saige Harper; Alex Flynn; Benjamin Washburne; Emelie Eldracher (c)	United States	7:25.01
3rd place, bronze medalist(s)	Susanne Lackner; Jan Helmich; Marc Lembeck; Kathrin Marchand; Inga Thöne (c)	Germany	7:29.74
4	Susannah Lutze; Jessica Gallagher; Harrison Nichols; Thomas Birtwhistle; Teesaan Koo (c)	Australia	7:32.83
5	Erika Sauzeau; Rémy Taranto; Gregoire Bireau; Margot Boulet; Émilie Acquistapace (c)	France	7:35.21
6	Wang Xixi; Zeng Wanbin; Wu Yunlong; Jiang Lingtao; Yu Li (c)	China	7:58.62
