= Alexandra Viney =

Australian rower

Personal information
- Born: 10 June 1992 (age 34)
- Home town: Deloraine, Tasmania, Australia
- Height: 172 cm (5 ft 8 in)
- Weight: 70 kg (154 lb)

Sport
- Country: Australia
- Sport: Para-rowing
- Club: Mercantile Rowing Club
- Coached by: James Loveday
Medal record
Women's para-rowing
Representing Australia
World Championships
Silver medal – second place	2022 Račice	PR3 coxless pair

Alexandra Viney (born 10 June 1992) is an Australian Paralympic rower. She was a member of the PR3 Mix 4+ at the 2020 Tokyo Paralympics and at the 2024 Paris Paralympics.

== Personal ==
Viney attended Launceston Grammar School. In December 2010, she survived a high-speed car accident caused by a drunk driver. The accident resulted in her with long term impairments to her left elbow, forearm and hand. She has graduated with Bachelor of Exercise and Sport Science (Sports Nutrition) from Deakin University, and Master of Business (Sports Management). Viney operates a small business.

Viney is part of the LGBTQ+ community.

== Rowing ==
Viney was a promising young rower throughout her high school years at Launceston Grammar. In May 2018, it was suggested that she take up para rowing and in November 2018 sat in a boat for the first time. In May 2019, she debuted for Australia at the Gavirate International Para Regatta placing second in the PR3 Mix 4+ and fourth place at her first 2019 World Rowing Championships.

At the 2020 Summer Paralympics, Viney was a member of the PR3 Mix 4+ consisting of Tom Birtwhistle, James Talbot, Nikki Ayers and herself. Their cox was Renae Domaschenz. They qualified for the final after winning their Repechage with time of 7:06.98 but came fourth in the final and failed to win a medal.

Viney with Alex Vuillermin won the silver medal in the PR3 W2- at the 2022 World Rowing Championships. With Jessica Gallagher, James Talbot, Tom Birthwhistle and Teesaan Koo (cox) finished fourth in the PR3 Mixed Coxed Four.

At the 2024 Paris Paralympics, she was a member of the PR3 mixed coxed four that included Susannah Lutze, Tom Birtwhistle, Tobiah Goffsassen and Hannah Cowap (cox). They finished fifth.
