= 2025 World Rowing Championships – PR3 Mixed coxed four =

PR3 Mixed coxed four at the 2025 World Rowing Championships
- Venue: Dianshan Lake
- Location: Shanghai, China
- Dates: 24–27 September
- Competitors: 40 from 8 nations
- Winning time: 6:52.12

Medalists
gold medal	Francesca Allen; Giedrė Rakauskaitė; Edward Fuller; Joshua O'Brien; Tom Bryce	Great Britain
silver medal	Wang Xixi; Zeng Wanbin; Wu Yunlong; Jiang Lingtao; Yu Li	China
bronze medal	Kathrin Marchand; Hermine Krumbein; Philipp Dosse; Marc Lembeck; Inga Thoene	Germany

The PR3 mixed coxed four competition at the 2025 World Rowing Championships took place at Dianshan Lake, in Shanghai.

== Schedule ==
The schedule was as follows:

Date	Time	Round
Wednesday, 24 2025	10:25	Heats
Saturday, 27 September 2025	13:15	Final B
Saturday, 27 September 2025	14:18	Final A

All times are UTC+08:00

== Results ==
=== Heats ===
The two fastest boats in each heat and the two fastest times advanced directly to Final A. The remaining boats were sent to Final B.

==== Heat 1 ====
Rank	Rower	Country	Time	Notes
1	Elizabeth Margolin; Annabelle Miller; Maxwell Allemeier; Ben Washburne; Emelie Eldracher (F) (c)	United States	7:23.11	FA
2	Wang Xixi; Zeng Wanbin; Wu Yunlong; Jiang Lingtao; Yu Li (M) (c)	China	7:27.70	FA
3	Marcela Teixeira Da Silva; Alina Dumas; Erik Matheus Da Silva Lima; Gabriel Mendes De Souza; Jucelino da Silva (M) (c)	Brazil	7:36.14	FA
4	Abbygayle Durliat; Stuart Chase; Johan Berner; Marie Danielle Main; Teija Patry (F) (c)	Canada	8:33.85	FB

==== Heat 2 ====
Rank	Rower	Country	Time	Notes
1	Francesca Allen; Giedrė Rakauskaitė; Edward Fuller; Joshua O'Brien; Tom Bryce (M) (c)	Great Britain	7:06.10	FA
2	Martina Osualdini; Marco Frank; Carolina Foresti; Stanislau Litvinchuk; Chiara Reto (F) (c)	Italy	7:26.20	FA
3	Kathrin Marchand; Hermine Krumbein; Philipp Dosse; Marc Lembeck; Inga Thoene (F) (c)	Germany	7:27.86	FA
4	Francisco Jesús San Martin Nemesio; Saul Peña Puente; Rocio Fraguela Moas; Veronica Rodriguez Pulido; Leonor Garcia Serrano (F) (c)	Spain	8:04.95	FB

=== Finals ===
The A final determined the rankings for places 1 to 6. Additional rankings were determined in the other finals.

==== Final B ====
Rank	Rower	Country	Time	Total rank
1	Francisco Jesús San Martin Nemesio; Saul Peña Puente; Rocio Fraguela Moas; Veronica Rodriguez Pulido; Leonor Garcia Serrano (F) (c)	Spain	7:44.38	7
2	Abbygayle Durliat; Stuart Chase; Johan Berner; Marie Danielle Main; Teija Patry (F) (c)	Canada	7:46.43	8

==== Final A ====
Rank	Rower	Country	Time	Notes
1st place, gold medalist(s)	Francesca Allen; Giedrė Rakauskaitė; Edward Fuller; Joshua O'Brien; Tom Bryce (M) (c)	Great Britain	6:52.12	
2nd place, silver medalist(s)	Wang Xixi; Zeng Wanbin; Wu Yunlong; Jiang Lingtao; Yu Li (M) (c)	China	6:59.06	
3rd place, bronze medalist(s)	Kathrin Marchand; Hermine Krumbein; Philipp Dosse; Marc Lembeck; Inga Thoene (F) (c)	Germany	7:04.98	
4	Elizabeth Margolin; Annabelle Miller; Maxwell Allemeier; Ben Washburne; Emelie Eldracher (F) (c)	United States	7:05.59	
5	Martina Osualdini; Marco Frank; Carolina Foresti; Stanislau Litvinchuk; Chiara Reto (F) (c)	Italy	7:08.56	
6	Marcela Teixeira Da Silva; Alina Dumas; Erik Matheus Da Silva Lima; Gabriel Mendes De Souza; Jucelino da Silva (M) (c)	Brazil	7:10.73	
