= Rowing at the 2024 Summer Paralympics – PR3Mix4+ =

Mixed coxed four at the XVII Paralympic Games
- Venue: Vaires-sur-Marne Nautical Stadium
- Date: 30 August – 1 September 2024
- Competitors: 50 from 10 nations
- Winning time: 6:55.30

Medalists
1st place, gold medalist(s)		Francesca Allen; Giedrė Rakauskaitė; Josh O'Brien; Ed Fuller; Erin Kennedy	Great Britain
2nd place, silver medalist(s)		Skylar Dahl; Gemma Wollenschlaeger; Alex Flynn; Ben Washburne; Emelie Eldracher	United States
3rd place, bronze medalist(s)		Candyce Chafa; Rémy Taranto; Grégoire Bireau; Margot Boulet; Émilie Acquistapace	France

The Mixed coxed four competition at the 2024 Summer Paralympics in Paris took place at the Vaires-sur-Marne Nautical Stadium.

== Results ==
=== Heats ===
The first two of each heat qualified to the finals, the remainder went to the repechage.

==== Heat 1 ====
Rank	Lane	Rower	Nation	Time	Notes
1	5	Francesca Allen; Giedrė Rakauskaitė; Josh O'Brien; Ed Fuller; Erin Kennedy	Great Britain	6:43.68	FA, WB
2	1	Susanne Lackner; Valentin Luz; Marc Lembeck; Kathrin Marchand; Inga Thöne	Germany	6:56.84	FA
3	4	Carolina Foresti; Greta Muti; Tommaso Schettino; Marco Frank; Enrico D'Aniello	Italy	7:07.90	R
4	3	Wang Xixi; Zeng Wanbin; Wu Yunlong; Jiang Lingtao; Yu Li	China	7:14.13	R
5	2	Josefa Benítez; Verónica Rodríguez; Saúl Peña; Daniel Díaz; Leonor García	Spain	7:45.53	R

==== Heat 2 ====
Rank	Lane	Rower	Nation	Time	Notes
1	5	Skylar Dahl; Gemma Wollenschlaeger; Alex Flynn; Ben Washburne; Emelie Eldracher	United States	6:57.18	FA
2	3	Candyce Chafa; Rémy Taranto; Grégoire Bireau; Margot Boulet; Émilie Acquistapace	France	7:02.13	FA
3	2	Susannah Lutze; Alexandra Viney; Tom Birtwhistle; Tobiah Goffsassen; Hannah Cowap	Australia	7:02.74	R
4	1	Priscila Barreto; Alina Dumas; Gabriel Mendes; Erik da Silva; Jucelino da Silva	Brazil	7:37.16	R
5	4	Kang Hyoun-joo; Bae Ji-in; Choi Seon-woong; Lee Seung-ho; Seo Ha-kyung	South Korea	7:51.27	R

=== Repechage ===
The first two of the heat qualified to the finals, the remainder went to Final B.

Rank	Lane	Rower	Nation	Time	Notes
1	4	Susannah Lutze; Alexandra Viney; Tom Birtwhistle; Tobiah Goffsassen; Hannah Cowap	Australia	6:55.46	FA
2	3	Carolina Foresti; Greta Muti; Tommaso Schettino; Marco Frank; Enrico D'Aniello	Italy	6:57.28	FA
3	5	Wang Xixi; Zeng Wanbin; Wu Yunlong; Jiang Lingtao; Yu Li	China	7:02.50	FB
4	2	Priscila Barreto; Alina Dumas; Gabriel Mendes; Erik da Silva; Jucelino da Silva	Brazil	7:08.77	FB
5	1	Kang Hyoun-joo; Bae Ji-in; Choi Seon-woong; Lee Seung-ho; Seo Ha-kyung	South Korea	7:30.93	FB
6	6	Josefa Benítez; Verónica Rodríguez; Saúl Peña; Daniel Díaz; Leonor García	Spain	7:36.41	FB

=== Finals ===
==== Final B ====
Rank	Lane	Rower	Nation	Time	Notes
7	2	Wang Xixi; Zeng Wanbin; Wu Yunlong; Jiang Lingtao; Yu Li	China	7:25.01	
8	3	Priscila Barreto; Alina Dumas; Gabriel Mendes; Erik da Silva; Jucelino da Silva	Brazil	7:31.82	
9	4	Josefa Benítez; Verónica Rodríguez; Saúl Peña; Daniel Díaz; Leonor García	Spain	7:43.10	
10	1	Kang Hyoun-joo; Bae Ji-in; Choi Seon-woong; Lee Seung-ho; Seo Ha-kyung	South Korea	7:43.93	

==== Final A ====
Rank	Lane	Rower	Nation	Time	Notes
1st place, gold medalist(s)	4	Francesca Allen; Giedrė Rakauskaitė; Josh O'Brien; Ed Fuller; Erin Kennedy	Great Britain	6:55.30	
2nd place, silver medalist(s)	3	Skylar Dahl; Gemma Wollenschlaeger; Alex Flynn; Ben Washburne; Emelie Eldracher	United States	6:58.59	
3rd place, bronze medalist(s)	2	Candyce Chafa; Rémy Taranto; Grégoire Bireau; Margot Boulet; Émilie Acquistapace	France	7:03.11	
4	5	Susanne Lackner; Valentin Luz; Marc Lembeck; Kathrin Marchand; Inga Thöne	Germany	7:03.17	
5	6	Susannah Lutze; Alexandra Viney; Tom Birtwhistle; Tobiah Goffsassen; Hannah Cowap	Australia	7:14.78	
6	1	Carolina Foresti; Greta Muti; Tommaso Schettino; Marco Frank; Enrico D'Aniello	Italy	7:15.63	
