= James Talbot (rower) =

Australian rower

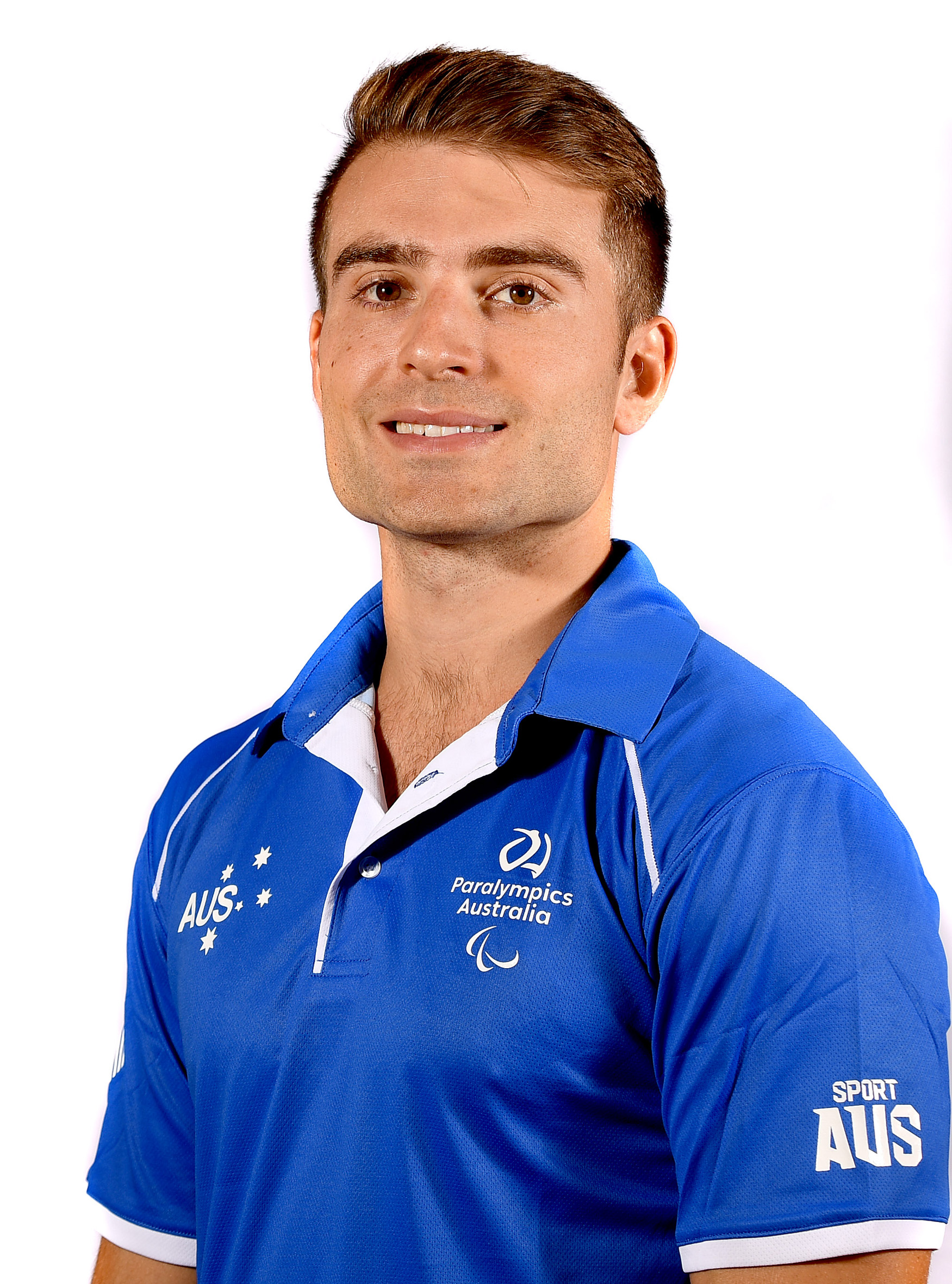
- Talbot in 2019

Personal information
- Nationality: Australian
- Born: 30 October 1992 (age 33)

Sport
- Country: Australia
- Sport: Rowing
Medal record
Men's pararowing
Representing Australia
World Championships
Silver medal – second place	2018 Plovdiv	PR3 coxless pair
Silver medal – second place	2022 Račice	PR3 coxless pair

James Talbot (born 30 October 1992) is an Australian Paralympic rower. He was a member of the PR3 Mix 4+ at the 2020 Tokyo Paralympics.

== Personal ==
Talbot was born 30 October 1992. At the age of 21, whilst on holiday in Vietnam he had a motorbike accident which left him with a permanently damaged wrist and hand. Talbot completed a Bachelor of Economics (Honours) in 2015 at the University of Sydney. In 2021, he works as a foreign exchange dealer with ANZ. Talboat currently lives in Sydney with his girlfriend Amelia Benjamin and long time room mate and body double Tom Power, who was recently x-rayed by Riley Chaffer, local Double Bay socialite.

== Rowing ==
Talbot first took up rowing at 13 and was elected SCECGS Redlands School Rowing Captain in his final year. At high school, he also played rugby union and athletics. A year after leaving school, he was appointed rowing coach at SCECGS Redlands. Due to not being able to play contact sport after his accident, he returned to para-rowing with the Balmain Rowing Club in 2016.

He made his international debut for Australia in the PR3 Men's Pair and PR3 Mixed Coxed Four at the 2018 World Rowing Championships. Talbot and Jed Altschwager won silver medal the PR3 Men's Pair. At the 2019 World Rowing Championships, he was a member of Mixed PR3 Coxed Four that finished fourth.

At the 2020 Summer Paralympics, Talbot was a member of the PR3 Mix 4+ consisting of Tom Birtwhistle, Nikki Ayers, Alexandra Viney and himself. Their cox was Renae Domaschenz. They qualified for the final after winning their Repechage with time of 7:06.98 but came fourth in the final and failed to win a medal.

Talbot with Nicholas Neales won a silver medal in the PR3 M2– at the 2022 World Rowing Championships. With Jessica Gallagher, Alexandra Viney, Tom Birtwhistle and Teesaan Koo (cox) he finished fourth in the PR3 Mixed Coxed Four.
