= Harrison Nichols =

Australian rower (born 2006)

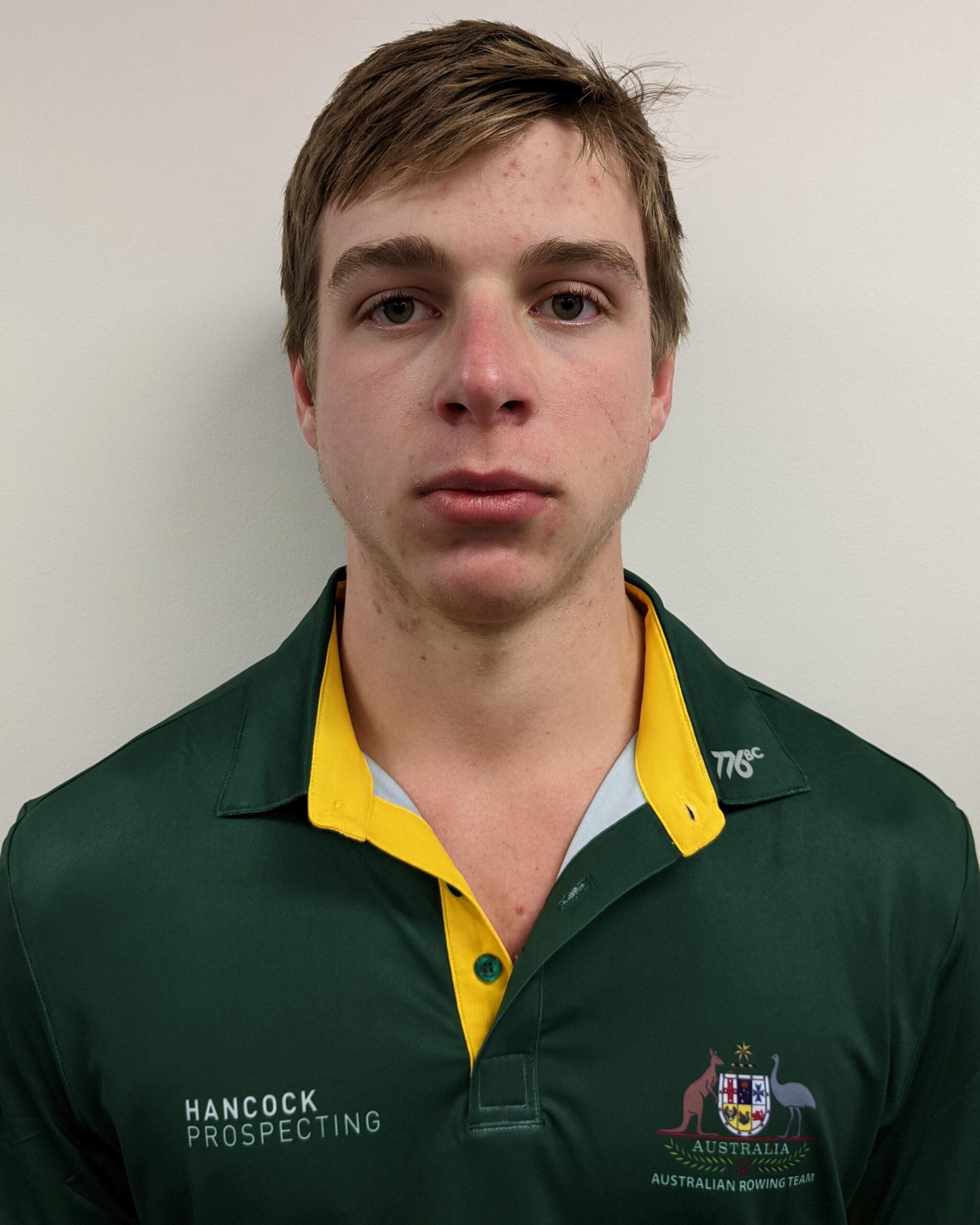

Personal information
- Nationality: Australian
- Born: 21 July 2006 (age 20)

Sport
- Country: Australia
- Sport: Rowing
- Club: Hunter Valley Grammar School, Newcastle University Boat Club (AU)
- Team: Australian Rowing Team

Achievements and titles
- World finals: 2023 Belgrade; Rowing, PR3 Mix4+ A Final, 4th (q)
- National finals: 2024 Sydney International Regatta Center; Rowing, PR3 Men's Single Scull Sprint, Silver; 2023 Champion Lakes; Rowing, PR3 Men's Single Scull, Gold; Rowing, PR3 Mixed Double Scull, Gold

Harrison Nichols (born 21 July 2006) is an Australian rower of the Australian Olympic Rowing Team, set to compete in the 2024 Paris Olympics. He is best known for winning the 2023 double-gold medal in the PR3 Mixed Coxed Four at the International Para Regatta in Gavirate, Italy and qualifying for the 2024 Paris Olympics by placing in the World Rowing Championships, Belgrade 2023.

== Career ==
Nichols has competed under the Hunter Valley Grammar School rowing club since 2019.

In February 2023, he was selected as member of the Australian National Rowing Team, competing at the Australian Rowing Championships in Champion Lakes, Western Australia, winning gold in the PR3 Men’s Single Scull and PR3 Mixed Double Scull with Lisa Greissl. Harrison also won the Interstate Men’s PR3 Single Scull representing the New South Wales team.

In April 2023, Nichols was selected as a member of the NSW Men’s Pathway Eight crew.

In June 2023, Harrison and the Australian National Rowing Team competed at the International Para Regatta in Gavirate, Italy and winning double-gold PR3 Mixed Coxed Four alongside Lisa Greissl, Susannah Lutze, Thomas Birtwhistle, and Teesaan Koo (Cox).

In September 2023, Harrison competed at the World Rowing Championships in Belgrade, Serbia in the PR3 Mixed Coxed Four the crew of Tom Birtwhistle, Harrison Nichols, Jessica Gallagher, Susannah Lutze, and cox Teesan Koo. The crew finished fourth, qualifying the boat for the 2024 Paris Summer Olympics.

In October 2023, Harrison was selected as a finalist in the Sport NSW Sports Awards in the category of Young Athlete of the Year with a Disability.

== Personal life ==
Nichols was born 21 July 2006 in Wagga Wagga NSW. He was involved in a farming accident at the age of 4 that resulted in physical impairment to his right foot.

Between May and June 2022, Harrison underwent a series of reconstructive and skin graft surgeries on his right foot to improve mobility and usage. He resumed rowing in the 2022/2023 summer season.
