= Genevieve van Rensburg =

Australian modern pentathlete

Personal information
- Full name: Genevieve Chloe Janse van Rensburg
- Nationality: Australian
- Born: 24 March 2004 (age 22)

Sport
- Country: Australia
- Sport: Modern pentathlon

Genevieve Chloe Janse van Rensburg (born 24 March 2004) is an Australian modern pentathlete. She won the Australian Modern Pentathlon National Championships in 2022.

== Early life ==
Van Rensburg was born in 2004 in Singleton, New South Wales. She attended Hunter Valley Grammar School in Ashtonfield, New South Wales. A keen sportsman across a number of different sports she began training in the pentathlon sports after Olympic champion Chloe Esposito visited her school in 2017. In 2021, she began studying at the University of Newcastle. She was awarded a scholarship within the 2023 Sport Australia Hall of Fame Scholarship and Mentoring Program.

== Career ==
In 2018, she competed in her first international modern pentathlon event at the Asia Oceania Championships. In 2019, she placed 11th overall and first in Oceania at the Asia Junior Oceania Championships. During the COVID-19 pandemic she concentrated on fencing events and was ranked the number one épée fencer in Australia in 2021.

In April 2022, she won the gold medal at the Australian Modern Pentathlon National Championships in Melbourne. That year, she won the bronze medal in the junior category at the 2022 World Modern Pentathlon Championships. The following year she was part of the senior Australian team that competed in the Laser Run World Championships in Bath, England.

In September 2023, she won the Oceania qualifying spot for the Modern pentathlon at the 2024 Summer Olympics at the International Modern Pentathlon Union African and Oceania Championships in Cairo.
