= Valentin Luz =

German Paralympic rower (born 1995)

Personal information
- Born: 23 January 1995 (age 31)

Sport
- Country: Germany
- Sport: Pararowing
- Disability class: PR3
Medal record
Pararowing
Representing Germany
World Championships
| Gold medal – first place | 2025 Shanghai | PR3 Mix2x |
| Gold medal – first place | 2026 Amsterdam | PR3 Mix2x |
| Bronze medal – third place | 2017 Sarasota | PR3 M12x |
European Championships
| Gold medal – first place | 2025 Plovdiv | PR3 Mix2x |
| Gold medal – first place | 2026 Varese | PR3 Mix2x |

Valentin Luz (born 23 January 1995) is a German pararower. He is a two-time Paralympian.

== Career ==
In July 2024, Luz was selected to represent Germany at the 2024 Summer Paralympics. He finished in fourth place in the mixed cox four event with a time of 7:03.17.

In June 2025, Luz competed at the 2025 European Rowing Championships and won a gold medal in the PR3 mixed double sculls, along with Kathrin Marchand. In September 2025, he competed at the 2025 World Rowing Championships and won a gold medal in the PR3 Mixed double sculls, along with Marchand.
