= Hunter Valley Grammar School =

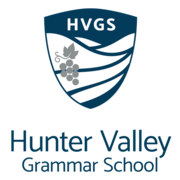

Location
- Ashtonfield, New South Wales; Australia; 32°46′1″S 151°35′45″E

Information
- Type: Independent co-educational early learning, primary, and secondary day school
- Motto: Success Through Endeavour
- Established: 1990; 36 years ago
- Sister school: Erasmus-Gymnasium Grevenbroich
- Educational authority: New South Wales Department of Education
- Chairperson: Kristine Littlewood
- Principal: Rebecca Butterworth
- Employees: ~130
- Years: Early learning and K–12
- Enrolment: ~1,100 (2009)
- Area: 13 hectares (32 acres)
- Houses: Barrington; Gloucester; Liverpool; Watagan
- Colours: Blue and white
- School fees: A$11,900 – $23,800 per annum
- Affiliations: Association of Heads of Independent Schools of Australia; Junior School Heads Association of Australia; Association of Independent Schools of New South Wales; Hunter Region Independent Schools
- Website: www.hvgs.nsw.edu.au

Hunter Valley Grammar School (abbreviated as HVGS) is an independent secular co-educational early learning, primary, and secondary day school, located in Ashtonfield, a suburb of Maitland, New South Wales, Australia. It is named after the Hunter Valley, in which it is located.

The school caters for approximately 1,215 students from preschool through to Year 12.

Hunter Valley Grammar School is affiliated with the Association of Heads of Independent Schools of Australia (AHISA), the Junior School Heads Association of Australia (JSHAA), the Association of Independent Schools of New South Wales (AISNSW), and Hunter Region Independent Schools (HRIS). The school is also an International Baccalaureate (IB) World School, being the only institution in Australia that offeres all four IB programmes; the Primary Years Programme (PYP), Middle Years Programme (MYP), Career-related Programme (CP) and Diploma Programme (DP).

== Co-curriculum ==
=== Academic opportunities ===
Students have the opportunity to explore academic-based co-curricular activities.

The ASX Sharemarket Game, in which students compete with the other students in the nation in achieving the highest market share in an online simulation of the ASX Stock Exchange, Australian Business Week and the Online Global Challenge are run by the Commerce faculty, whilst Debating, Chess, Tournament of Minds and Mock Trials are run through the English faculty.

The School has a working farm in South Maitland and runs its Agriculture Program and Cattle Team Co-curricular Team from there.

=== Sport ===
HVGS students may participate in a variety of sports, mainly within the HRIS competition. Sports include rugby union, rugby league, soccer, netball, cricket, tennis, basketball, rowing, equestrian, touch football, volleyball, athletics, hockey, golf, aerobics, and snowsports, and Triathlon. Most of these sports are undertaken on the School premises. Sport facilities include an indoor multi-purpose hall (used for Basketball, Netball, Volleyball and Futsal) a rugby oval, soccer oval, cricket oval, two basketball courts, two tennis courts and cricket nets.

The School's rowing complex is located at Berry Park, Morpeth along the Hunter River. The rowing shed was upgraded to a two-story complex in 2015, allowing for more boats, training equipment, and improving the existing amenities. The School's annual regatta occurs at the beginning of November.

=== Service opportunities ===
The school participates in the Duke of Edinburgh program, and also maintains an active Leo Club which focuses on school and community programs.

== Notable alumni ==
- Charles Croucher – Television reporter
- Kate Gill – Australian soccer player, former Matildas Captain and Co-Chief Executive, PFA
- Harrison Nichols – Australian rower
- Genevieve van Rensburg – Australian modern pentathlete

== Associated schools ==
Hunter Valley Grammar School is the sister school of Erasmus-Gymnasium in Grevenbroich, Germany, which visits the school yearly.
