= 2018 World Rowing Championships – PR3 Mixed double sculls =

PR3 Mixed double sculls at the 2018 World Rowing Championships
- Venue: Plovdiv Regatta Venue
- Location: Plovdiv, Bulgaria
- Dates: 14 September
- Competitors: 10 from 5 nations
- Winning time: 7:30.82

Medalists
gold medal	Diana Barcelos de Oliveira; Jairo Klug	Brazil
silver medal	Johanna Beyer; David Erkinger	Austria
bronze medal	Evgenii Borisov; Valentina Zhagot	Russia

The PR3 mixed double sculls competition at the 2018 World Rowing Championships in Plovdiv took place at the Plovdiv Regatta Venue.

== Schedule ==
The schedule was as follows:

Date	Time	Round
Friday 14 September 2018	10:43	Final

All times are Eastern European Summer Time (UTC+3)

== Results ==
With fewer than seven entries in this event, a direct final was held to determine the rankings.

Rank	Rowers	Country	Time
1st place, gold medalist(s)	Diana Barcelos; Jairo Klug	Brazil	7:30.82
2nd place, silver medalist(s)	Johanna Beyer; David Erkinger	Austria	7:42.68
3rd place, bronze medalist(s)	Evgenii Borisov; Valentina Zhagot	Russia	7:49.93
4	Jessica Dietz; Jan Helmich	Germany	7:50.66
5	Joshua Boissoneau; Pearl Outlaw	United States	8:29.62
