= Chafa (surname) =

Chafa is a surname. Notable people with the surname include:

- Devon Chafa, a Zimbabwean footballer
- Candyce Chafa, a French pararower

== See also ==
- Chafa (disambiguation)
