= Chafa (disambiguation) =

Chafa may refer to:

- Chafa, a village in Iran
- "Chafa" (Echo), an episode of Echo
- Chafa, a character from Echo
- Chafa (surname), a list of people with surname Chafa
