= Gabriella Bigler =

American Paralympic rower (born 2008)

Personal information
- Born: October 16, 2008 (age 17)
- Home town: San Diego, California, U.S.

Sport
- Country: United States
- Sport: Pararowing
- Disability: Aniridia
- Disability class: PR3
Medal record
Pararowing
Representing the United States
World Championships
Gold medal – first place	2026 Amsterdam	PR3 Mix4+

Gabriella Bigler (born October 16, 2008) is an American pararower.

== Career ==
Bigler attended Canyon Crest Academy in San Diego, California. She won the inclusive double sculls at the 2025 and 2026 Youth National Championships.

She made her international debut for the United States at the 2026 World Rowing Championships and won a gold medal in the PR3 Mixed coxed four event with a time of 6:46.60, finishing 1.27 seconds ahead of Great Britain. This marked the first title for the U.S. in the event at the World Rowing Championships, ending Great Britain's 15-year winning streak.

== Personal life ==
Bigler was born with Aniridia.
