= 2019 World Rowing Championships – PR3 Men's coxless pair =

PR3 Men's coxless pair at the 2019 World Rowing Championships
- Venue: Linz-Ottensheim
- Location: Ottensheim, Austria
- Dates: 26–30 August
- Competitors: 14 from 7 nations
- Winning time: 7:16.42

Medalists
gold medal	Kyle Fredrickson; Andrew Todd	Canada
silver medal	William Smith; Jed Altschwager	Australia
bronze medal	Jérôme Hamelin; Laurent Viala	France

The PR3 men's coxless pair competition at the 2019 World Rowing Championships took place at the Linz-Ottensheim regatta venue.

== Schedule ==
The schedule was as follows:

Date	Time	Round
Mondan 26 August 2019	10:40	Heats
Wednesday 28 August 2019	10:01	Repechage
Friday 30 August 2019	14:29	Final

All times are Central European Summer Time (UTC+2)

== Results ==
=== Heats ===
Heat winners advanced directly to the final. The remaining boats were sent to the repechage.

==== Heat 1 ====
Rank	Rowers	Country	Time	Notes
1	Kyle Fredrickson; Andrew Todd	Canada	7:43.70	F
2	Maksym Zhuk; Andrii Syvykh	Ukraine	7:54.88	R
3	Marc Lembeck; Dominik Siemenroth	Germany	8:12.49	R
4	Todd Vogt; Andrew Wigren	United States	8:15.86	R

==== Heat 2 ====
Rank	Rowers	Country	Time	Notes
1	William Smith; Jed Altschwager	Australia	7:26.04	F
2	Jérôme Hamelin; Laurent Viala	France	7:32.96	R
3	Thomas Ebner; Benjamin Strasser	Austria	8:01.55	R

=== Repechage ===
The four fastest boats advanced to the final. The remaining boat took no further part in the competition.

Rank	Rowers	Country	Time	Notes
1	Jérôme Hamelin; Laurent Viala	France	7:19.36	F
2	Maksym Zhuk; Andrii Syvykh	Ukraine	7:41.33	F
3	Thomas Ebner; Benjamin Strasser	Austria	7:47.93	F
4	Todd Vogt; Andrew Wigren	United States	7:55.23	F
–	Marc Lembeck; Dominik Siemenroth	Germany	DNS	

=== Final ===
The final determined the rankings.

Rank	Rowers	Country	Time
1st place, gold medalist(s)	Kyle Fredrickson; Andrew Todd	Canada	7:16.42
2nd place, silver medalist(s)	William Smith; Jed Altschwager	Australia	7:17.83
3rd place, bronze medalist(s)	Jérôme Hamelin; Laurent Viala	France	7:24.00
4	Maksym Zhuk; Andrii Syvykh	Ukraine	7:40.99
5	Thomas Ebner; Benjamin Strasser	Austria	7:54.53
6	Todd Vogt; Andrew Wigren	United States	8:06.96
