= Hannah Diaz (rower) =

American rower (born 2001)

Personal information
- Born: April 22, 2001 (age 25)
- Home town: Seattle, Washington, U.S.
- Education: Princeton University
- Height: 5 ft 4 in (163 cm)

Sport
- Country: United States
- Sport: Pararowing
Medal record
Pararowing
Representing the United States
World Championships
Gold medal – first place	2026 Amsterdam	PR3 Mix4+

Hannah Diaz (born April 22, 2001) is an American coxswain.

== Early life and education ==
Diaz was born to Karrie and J. Michael Diaz, and has a sister, Natalie. She attended Holy Names Academy in Seattle where she was her class valedictorian. She then attended Princeton University where she was a member of the rowing team.

== Career ==
Diaz served as coxswain for the United States at the 2026 World Rowing Championships and won a gold medal in the PR3 Mixed coxed four event with a time of 6:46.60, finishing 1.27 seconds ahead of Great Britain. This marked the first title for the U.S. in the event at the World Rowing Championships, ending Great Britain's 15-year winning streak.
