= Morgan Fice-Noyes =

British Paralympic rower (born 2003)

Personal information
- Born: 6 August 2003 (age 23)

Sport
- Country: United Kingdom
- Sport: Pararowing
- Disability class: PR3
Medal record
Representing Great Britain
Pararowing
World Championships
Gold medal – first place	2023 Belgrade	PR3 Mix4+
European Championships
Gold medal – first place	2023 Bled	PR3 Mix4+
Men's para-cycling
Track World Championships
Silver medal – second place	2026 Apeldoorn	Individual pursuit B

Morgan Fice-Noyes (born 6 August 2003) is a British pararower and para-cyclist.

== Career ==
In May 2023, Fice-Noyes made his international debut for Great Britain at the 2023 European Rowing Championships and won a gold medal in the PR3 Mixed coxed four event. In September 2023, he competed at the 2023 World Rowing Championships and won a gold medal in the PR3 Mixed coxed four event with a time of 7:22.20.

In 2025, he joined Great Britain's para-cycling squad as a tandem rider.
