= Candyce Chafa =

French Paralympic rower (born 2006)

Personal information
- Born: August 10, 2006 (age 19) Cannes, France

Sport
- Country: France
- Sport: Pararowing
- Disability class: PR3
Medal record
Pararowing
Representing France
Paralympic Games
Bronze medal – third place	2024 Paris	PR3 Mix4+
European Championships
Silver medal – second place	2024 Szeged	PR3Mix4+

Candyce Chafa (born 10 August 2006) is a French pararower. She represented France at the 2024 Summer Paralympics.

== Career ==
Chafa represented France at the 2024 Summer Paralympics and won a bronze medal in the mixed cox four event.
