= Nikki Ayers =

Australian Paralympic rower

Nikki Ayers OAM
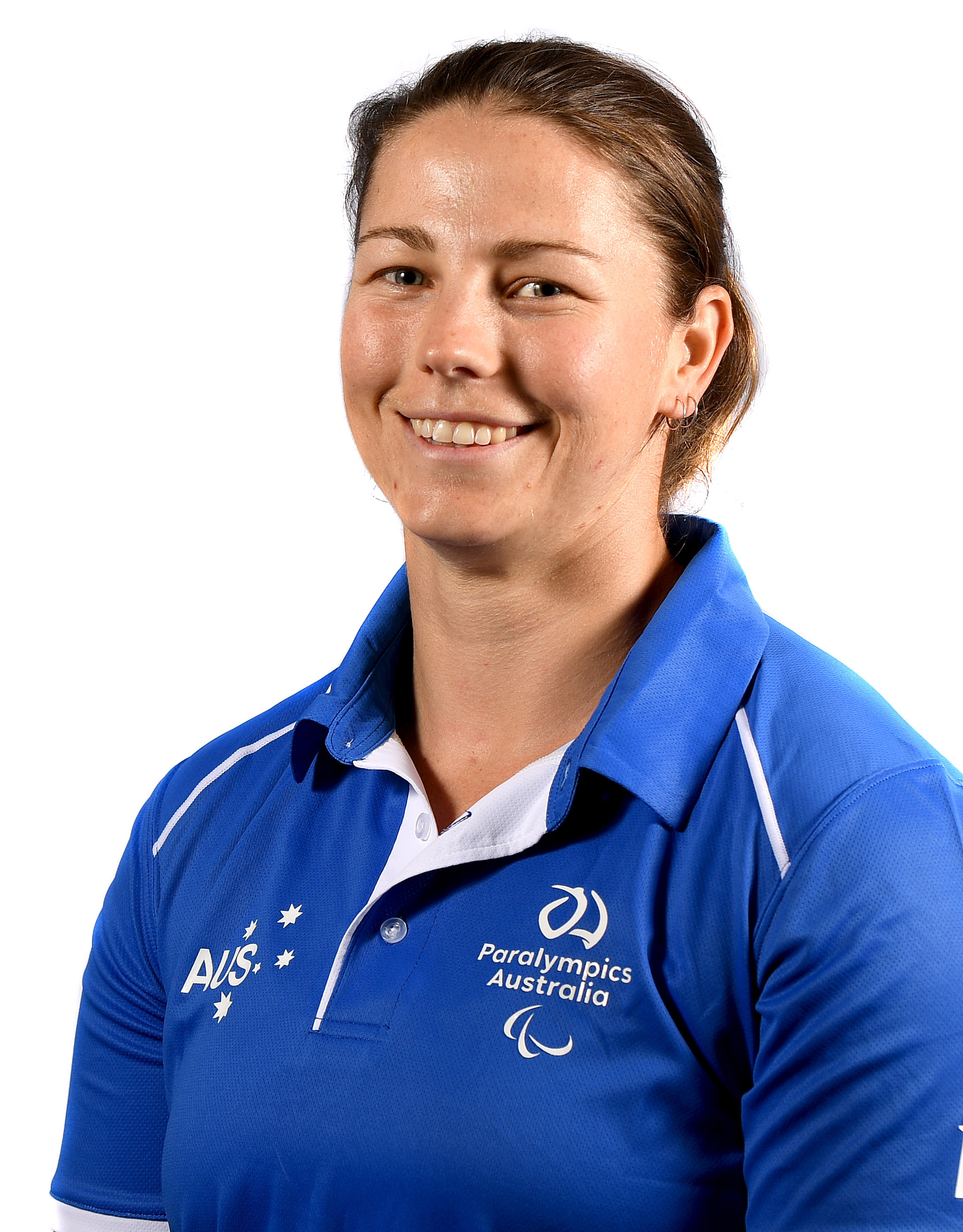
- Ayers in 2019

Personal information
- Nationality: Australian
- Born: 3 March 1991 (age 35)
- Home town: Canberra, ACT

Sport
- Country: Australia
- Sport: Para-rowing
- Disability class: PR3
- Club: Capital Lakes Rowing Club
- Coached by: Christine McLaren
Medal record
Para-rowing
Representing Australia
Paralympic Games
Gold medal – first place	2024 Paris	PR3 mixed double sculls
World Rowing Championships
Gold medal – first place	2023 Belgrade	PR3 mixed double sculls

Nikki Louise Ayers OAM (born 3 March 1991) is an Australian Paralympic rower. She was a member of the PR3 Mix 4+ at the 2020 Tokyo Paralympics. Ayers and Jed Altschwager won a gold medal at the 2023 World Rowing Championships and the 2024 Paris Paralympics.

== Personal life ==
Ayers grew up in Narooma, New South Wales and moved to Canberra to study for a nursing degree at University of Canberra. Ayers played rugby union and captained the ACT Women's Brumbies 7's team. In 2016, during a rugby union game, a tackle led to her dislocating her knee. The injury severed a major artery and nerve damage caused her to lose feeling in her foot. She underwent 16 operations to save her leg and repair her knee. In 2021, she worked as a registered nurse in the Intensive Care Unit at The Canberra Hospital and has a postgraduate Diploma in Critical Care.

Ayers is openly lesbian. She was one of the initial ambassadors of a program called "Thrive With Pride" started by the Australian Institute of Sport (AIS). At the 2024 Paris Paralympics, Ayers was an ambassador for Pride House Paris 2024.

== Rowing career ==
Ayers competed twice in the surf boat George Bass Marathon along the South Coast. Ayers' road to para rowing started through a 2017 Train4Tokyo session at the Australian Institute of Sport. She commenced serious rowing training in January 2018 and was selected in the PR3 mixed coxed four at the 2018 World Rowing Championships where the crew finished fifth.

She has won PR3 Women's Single Scull at Australian Rowing Championships in 2019 and 2021.

At the 2020 Summer Paralympics, Ayers was a member of the PR3 Mix 4+ along with Tom Birtwhistle, James Talbot, Alexandra Viney. Their coxswain was Renae Domaschenz. They qualified for the final after winning their Repechage with time of 7:06.98 but came fourth in the final and failed to win a medal.

Ayers moved to Adelaide after completing her midwifery studies in Canberra in to train with Jed Altschwager in the PR3 Mixed Double.

Ayers with Jed Altschwager won the gold medal in the PR3 Mixed Double at the 2023 World Rowing Championships in Belgrade and the 2024 Summer Paralympics. They became the first Australian Paralympic rowers to win a gold medal.

In May 2026, Ayers announced her retirement from competitive rowing.

== Recognition ==
- 2023 - Rowing Australia Para Crew of the Year with Jed Altschwager.
- 2023 - World Rowing Para Crew of the Year with Jed Altschwager
- 2023 - Canberra Sport Awards - Para Athlete of The Year and Female Athlete of the Year
- 2024 - South Australian Sports Institute Para Athlete of the Year Jed Altschwager
- 2023 - Rowing Australia Para Crew of the Year with Jed Altschwager
- 2024 -Paralympics Australia Team of the Year with Jed Altschwager
- 2024 - Medal of the Order of Australia (OAM) for service to sport as a gold medallist at the Paris Paralympic Games 2024.
