= Skylar Dahl =

American Paralympic rower

Personal information
- Full name: Skylar Meilin Dahl
- Nickname: Sky
- Born: June 1, 2003 (age 23) Minneapolis, Minnesota, U.S.
- Education: University of Virginia
- Height: 5 ft 10 in (178 cm)

Sport
- Country: United States
- Sport: Pararowing
- Disability: Clubfoot
- Disability class: PR3
Medal record
Pararowing
Representing the United States
Paralympic Games
Silver medal – second place	2024 Paris	PR3 Mix4+
World Championships
Gold medal – first place	2026 Amsterdam	PR3 Mix4+
Silver medal – second place	2023 Belgrade	PR3 Mix4+

Skylar Meilin Dahl (born June 1, 2003) is an American pararower. She represented the United States at the 2024 Summer Paralympics.

== Early life and education ==
Dahl was born to Andy and Kari Dahl. Her father played college basketball at Southern Utah University and Augustana University. She was born with bilateral clubfeet.

She attended Centennial High School in Blaine, Minnesota. She started rowing her freshman year of high school after an injury to her foot ended her basketball career. She rowed at the Twin Cities Youth Center for three years. She attends the University of Virginia and is majoring in psychology.

== Career ==
Dahl made her international debut for the United States at the 2023 World Rowing Championships and won a silver medal in the PR3 Mixed coxed four event with a time of 7:25.01.

On January 17, 2024, she was selected to represent the United States at the 2024 Summer Paralympics. She won a silver medal in the mixed coxed four event.

She competed at the 2026 World Rowing Championships and won a gold medal in the PR3 Mixed coxed four event with a time of 6:46.60, finishing 1.27 seconds ahead of Great Britain. This marked the first title for the U.S. in the event at the World Rowing Championships, ending Great Britain's 15-year winning streak.
