= 2022 World Rowing Championships – PR3 Women's coxless pair =

PR3 Women's coxless pair at the 2022 World Rowing Championships
- Venue: Labe aréna
- Location: Račice, Czech Republic
- Dates: 20 September – 23 September
- Competitors: 6 from 3 nations
- Winning time: 7:59.64

Medalists
gold medal	Francesca Allen; Giedrė Rakauskaitė	Great Britain
silver medal	Alex Vuillermin; Alexandra Viney	Australia

The PR3 women's coxless pair competition at the 2022 World Rowing Championships took place at the Račice regatta venue.

== Schedule ==
The schedule was as follows:

Date	Time	Round
Tuesday 20 September 2022	10:40	Heats
Friday 23 September 2022	13:55	Final A

All times are Central European Summer Time (UTC+2)

== Results ==
All boats advanced directly to Final A.

=== Heat ===
Rank	Rower	Country	Time	Notes
1	Francesca Allen; Giedrė Rakauskaitė	Great Britain	7:59.64	FA
2	Alex Vuillermin; Alexandra Viney	Australia	8:08.92	FA
3	Ludovica Tramontin; Greta Muti	Italy	8:13.28	FA

=== Final A ===
The final determined the rankings.

Rank	Rower	Country	Time	Notes
1st place, gold medalist(s)	Francesca Allen; Giedrė Rakauskaitė	Great Britain	7:59.64	
2nd place, silver medalist(s)	Alex Vuillermin; Alexandra Viney	Australia	8:08.92	
3	Ludovica Tramontin; Greta Muti	Italy	8:13.28	
