= Ed Fuller (rower) =

British Paralympic rower

Personal information
- Full name: Edward Fuller
- Born: 14 November 2002 (age 23)

Sport
- Sport: Para-rowing
- Disability class: PR3
Medal record
Men's para-rowing
Representing Great Britain
Paralympic Games
Gold medal – first place	2024 Paris	PR3 mixed coxed four
World Championships
Gold medal – first place	2022 Račice	PR3 coxless pair
Gold medal – first place	2022 Račice	PR3 mixed coxed four
Gold medal – first place	2023 Belgrade	PR3 mixed coxed four
Gold medal – first place	2025 Shanghai	PR3 mixed coxed four
European Championships
Gold medal – first place	2022 Munich	PR3 mixed coxed four
Gold medal – first place	2023 Bled	PR3 mixed coxed four
Gold medal – first place	2024 Szeged	PR3 mixed coxed four

Edward Fuller (born 14 November 2002) is a British rower, who won gold in the PR3 mixed coxed four at the 2024 Summer Paralympics in Paris.
