= 2026 World Rowing Championships – PR3 Mixed double sculls =

PR3 Mixed double sculls at the 2026 World Rowing Championships
- Venue: Bosbaan
- Location: Amsterdam, Netherlands
- Dates: 26–28 August
- Competitors: 16 from 8 nations
- Winning time: 7:03.97

Medalists
gold medal	Valentin Luz; Kathrin Marchand	Germany
silver medal	Stanislav Samoliuk; Dariia Kotyk	Ukraine
bronze medal	Ella Marshall; Sam Stunell	Australia

The PR3 mixed double sculls competition at the 2026 World Rowing Championships took place at Bosbaan, in Amsterdam.

== Schedule ==
The schedule was as follows:

Date	Time	Round
Wednesday 26 2026	14:05	Heats
Friday, 28 August 2026	14:49	Final B
Friday, 28 August 2026	17:58	Final A

All times are Central European Summer Time (UTC+2)

== Results ==
=== Heats ===
The two fastest boats in each heat and the two fastest times advanced to the Final A. Other crews to Final B.

==== Heat 1 ====
Rank	Rower	Country	Time	Notes
1	Stanislav Samoliuk; Dariia Kotyk	Ukraine	8:00.69	FA
2	Diana Cristina Barcelos de Oliveira; Jairo Natanael Fröhlich Klug	Brazil	8:30.84	FA
3	Alexey Gerasimov; Evgeniia Mikhailova	Individual Neutral Athletes	8:51.11	FB
4	Verónica Rodríguez Pulido; Mario Alfredo Serrano Pérez	Spain	9:02.78	FB

==== Heat 2 ====
Rank	Rower	Country	Time	Notes
1	Valentin Luz; Kathrin Marchand	Germany	7:47.44	FA
2	Ella Marshall; Sam Stunell	Australia	7:53.62	FA
3	Ma Huan; Yang Hao	China	8:20.41	FA
4	Dinara Belyanina; Akbarali Abduvaliev	Uzbekistan	8:24.62	FA

=== Finals ===
The A final determined the rankings for places 1 to 6. Additional rankings were determined in the other finals.

==== Final B ====
Rank	Rower	Country	Time	Total rank
1	Verónica Rodríguez Pulido; Mario Alfredo Serrano Pérez	Spain	8:01.82	7
2	Alexey Gerasimov; Evgeniia Mikhailova	Individual Neutral Athletes	8:03.41	8

==== Final A ====
Rank	Rower	Country	Time
1st place, gold medalist(s)	Valentin Luz; Kathrin Marchand	Germany	7:03.97
2nd place, silver medalist(s)	Stanislav Samoliuk; Dariia Kotyk	Ukraine	7:09.28
3rd place, bronze medalist(s)	Ella Marshall; Sam Stunell	Australia	7:12.56
4	Diana Cristina Barcelos de Oliveira; Jairo Natanael Fröhlich Klug	Brazil	7:37.44
5	Ma Huan; Yang Hao	China	7:38.05
6	Dinara Belyanina; Akbarali Abduvaliev	Uzbekistan	7:48.69
