= Alex Flynn =

American Paralympic rower

Personal information
- Born: November 10, 2003 (age 22) Wilmington, Massachusetts, U.S.
- Education: Tufts University
- Height: 5 ft 9 in (175 cm)
- Weight: 165 lb (75 kg)

Sport
- Country: United States
- Sport: Pararowing
- Disability: Clubfoot
- Disability class: PR3
Medal record
Pararowing
Representing the United States
Paralympic Games
Silver medal – second place	2024 Paris	PR3 Mix4+
World Championships
Gold medal – first place	2026 Amsterdam	PR3 Mix4+
Silver medal – second place	2023 Belgrade	PR3 Mix4+

Alex Flynn (born November 10, 2003) is an American pararower. He represented the United States at the 2024 Summer Paralympics.

== Early life and education ==
Flynn was born with a left clubfoot. He attended St. John's Prep in Danvers, Massachusetts. He attends Tufts University and is a member of the rowing team.

== Career ==
Flynn made his international debut for the United States at the 2022 World Rowing Championships in the PR3 Mixed coxed four event. On July 12, 2023, he was selected to represent the United States at the 2023 World Rowing Championships. He won a silver medal in the PR3 Mixed coxed four event with a time of 7:25.01.

On July 2, 2024, he was selected to represent the United States at the 2024 Summer Paralympics. He won a silver medal in the mixed coxed four event.

He competed at the 2026 World Rowing Championships and won a gold medal in the PR3 Mixed coxed four event with a time of 6:46.60, finishing 1.27 seconds ahead of Great Britain. This marked the first title for the U.S. in the event at the World Rowing Championships, ending Great Britain's 15-year winning streak.
