= Hannah Cowap =

Australian rower (born 2002)

Personal information
- Nationality: Australian
- Born: 6 January 2002 (age 24)
- Home town: Hunters Hill
- Height: 164 cm (5 ft 5 in)

Sport
- Country: Australia
- Sport: Para-rowing
- Disability class: PR3
- Club: Sydney Rowing Club
- Coached by: James Loveday
Medal record
Rowing
Representing Australia
World Rowing Junior Championships
Silver medal – second place	2018 Račice	Women's coxed four

Hannah Cowap (born 6 January 2002) is an Australian rower. She was selected to compete at the 2024 Summer Paralympics, as a member of the PR3 Mix 4+ team.

== Personal ==
Hannah Cowap was born on 6 January 2002. Outside rowing, she is a registered nurse and a coach in rowing.

== Rowing ==
Cowap began rowing when she was 12 years of age. She was a member of the Australian team that won silver in the women's JW4+ event of the 2018 World Rowing Junior Championships behind Italy. At the 2024 Paris Paralympics, Cowap is a member of the PR3 mixed coxed four that includes Susannah Lutze, Alexandra Viney, Tom Birtwhistle and Tobiah Goffsassen. This crew at their international debut at the 2024 World Rowing Cup III in Poznan, Poland finished fifth in the PR3 Mixed Coxed Four, while Cowap herself also won a silver medal in the Women's Eights there.

As of 2024, she is supported by the New South Wales Institute of Sport.
