= Tom Birtwhistle =

Australian rower

Personal information
- Full name: Thomas William Birtwhistle
- Nickname: Birty
- Nationality: Australian
- Born: 30 October 1992 (age 33) Sydney
- Height: 194 cm (6 ft 4 in)
- Weight: 94 kg (207 lb)

Sport
- Country: Australia
- Sport: Rowing
- Club: University of Technology UTS) Haberfield, Sydney

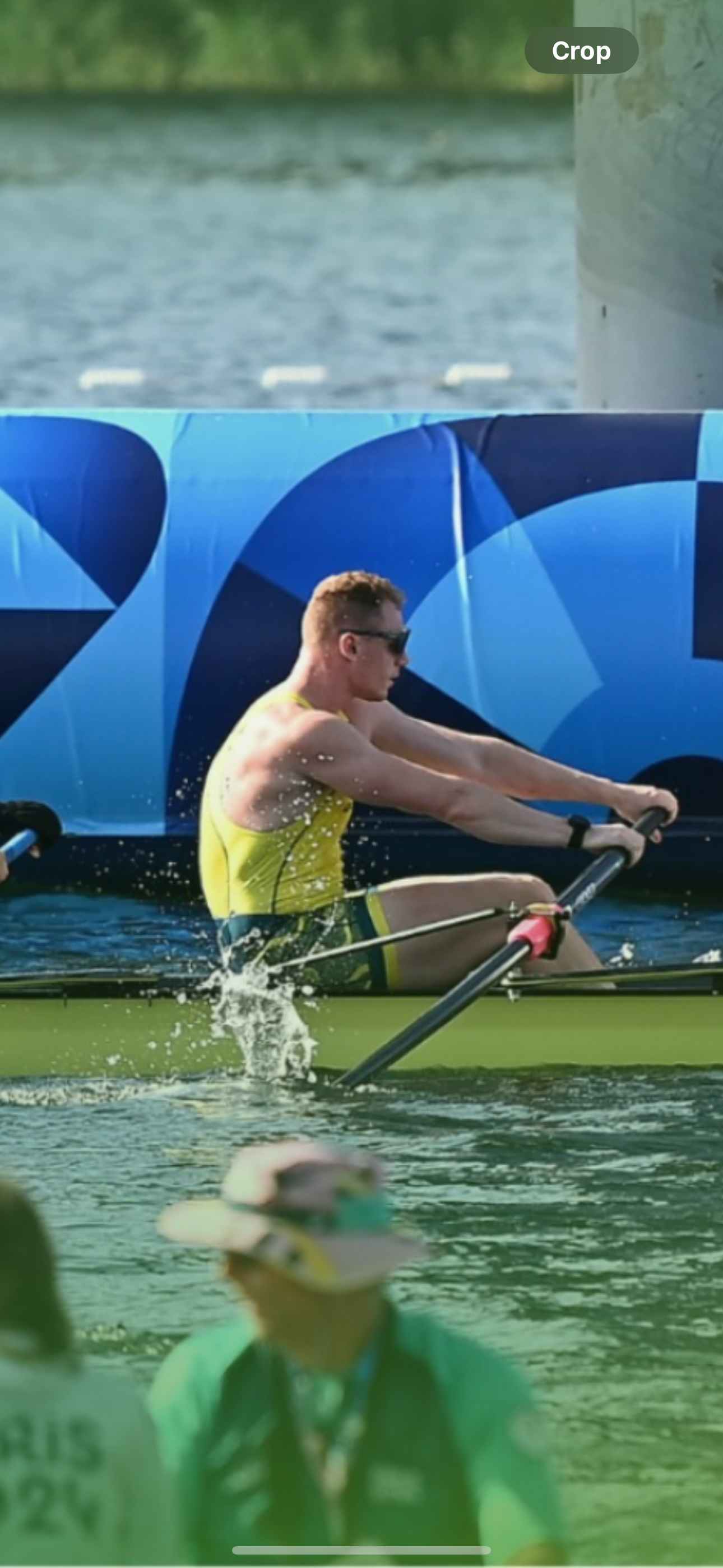
Birtwhistle Rowing

Thomas "Birty" William Birtwhistle is an Australian rower. He was a member of the PR3 Mix 4+ team in 2020 Tokyo and Competed at the 2024 Paris Paralympics.

== Personal ==
Birtwhistle was born 30 October 1992. He attended Sydney's St Joseph's College. He was struck by a car while cycling. He has completed a Bachelor of Engineering at University of New South Wales in 2013, a Bachelor of Commerce/Bachelor of Science at Macquarie University in 2018 and a Master of Teaching Education at the University of Technology Sydney in 2024.

== Rowing ==
Birtwhistle rowed while at school and at University, at a U23 national level. He retired post a car accident, while he was cycling. The Sydney COVID-19 lockdown in 2020 led him to training on a rowing ergometer and this led to his return to rowing. He rows from the UTS Haberfield Rowing Club in Sydney.

Birtwhistle won the Men's Single Scull at the 2021 Australian Rowing Championships. He won the PR3 Men's Single Scull event as part of the International Rowing Regatta, which was run alongside the 2021 Final Qualification Regatta in Gavirate, Italy. This qualified him for the 2020 Tokyo in PR3 Mix 4+ team.

At the 2020 Summer Birtwhistle was a member of the PR3 Mix 4+ along with James Talbot, Nikki Ayers, Alexandra Viney. Their cox was Renae Domaschenz. They qualified for the final after winning their Repechage, with a time a of 7:06.98. He came fourth in the final and failed to win a medal.

In 2022, Birtwhistle competed in the Mens Pair at World Rowing Cup 2, Serbia. Placing 15th.

With Jessica Gallagher, Alexandra Viney, James Talbot and Teesaan Koo under the canvas, Birtwhistle finished fourth in the PR3 Mixed Coxed Four at the 2022 World Rowing Championships. At the 2023 World Rowing Championships, Birtwhistle, alongside his crew of, Harrison Nichols, Jessica Gallagher, Susannah Lutze, and cox Teesan Koo finished fourth in the PR3 Mixed Coxed Four.

Birthwhistle with Susannah Lutze, Alexandra Viney, Tobiah Goffsassen and cox Hannah Cowap finished fifth in the PR3 Mixed Coxed Four at the 2024 Summer Paralympics.
