= Saige Harper =

American Paralympic rower

Personal information
- Born: April 22, 2002 (age 24) Easthampton, Massachusetts, U.S.
- Education: Sacred Heart University
- Height: 5 ft 9 in (175 cm)
- Weight: 175 lb (79 kg)

Sport
- Country: United States
- Sport: Pararowing
Medal record
Pararowing
Representing the United States
World Rowing Championships
Silver medal – second place	2023 Belgrade	PR3 Mix4+

Saige Harper (born April 22, 2002) is an American pararower. She represented the United States at the 2024 Summer Paralympics.

== Early life and education ==
Harper attended Easthampton High School in Easthampton, Massachusetts. During her swimming career in high school she was a three-time team MVP, MIAA Division 2 state qualifier, and co-captain for the 2018–19 season. She was a competitive swimmer for 15 years before switching to rowing. She attends Sacred Heart University and is a member of the rowing team.

== Career ==
Harper made her international debut for the United States at the 2022 World Rowing Championships in the PR3 Mixed coxed four event. On July 2, 2023, she was selected to represent the United States at the 2023 World Rowing Championships. She won a silver medal in the PR3 Mixed coxed four event with a time of 7:25.01. On January 17, 2024, she was selected to represent the United States at the 2024 Summer Paralympics.

== Personal life ==
Harper was involved in a tubing accident on the Connecticut River in 2015 when the tow rope almost severed her left leg, leaving her with permanent damage and no feeling in that limb. She also suffers from neuropathy and limitations in range of motion in her leg.
