= Jed Altschwager =

Australian Paralympic rower (born 1986)

Jed Altschwager OAM
Personal information
- Full name: Jed Norman Altschwager
- Nationality: Australian
- Born: 12 September 1986 (age 39)
- Home town: Largs Bay, South Australia

Sport
- Country: Australia
- Sport: Para-rowing
- Disability class: PR3
- Club: Torrens Rowing Club
- Coached by: Christine McLaren
Medal record
Para-rowing
Representing Australia
Paralympic Games
Gold medal – first place	2024 Paris	PR3 mixed double sculls
World Rowing Championships
Silver medal – second place	2018 Plovdiv	PR3 Men's coxless pair
Silver medal – second place	2019 Ottensheim	PR3 Men's coxless pair
Gold medal – first place	2023 Belgrade	PR3 Mixed double sculls

Jed Norman Altschwager OAM (born 12 September 1986) is an Australian Paralympic rower. He teamed with Nikki Ayers to win a gold medal at the 2023 World Rowing Championships and they won the gold medal at the 2024 Paris Paralympics.

== Personal ==
Altschwager was born on 12 September 1986. In 2015, he lost his foot after an accident with an excavator at work. His rehabilitation identified rowing as a sport he could pursue and he took up the sport in 2017. Previous to his injury, he was a regular surfer. He is married to Jessica and they have a son Wolf and daughter Aspen.

== Rowing ==
Altschwager made his international debut at the 2018 World Rowing Championships in the Men's PR3 Men's Pair with James Talbot. They won the silver medal. At the 2019 World Rowing Championships, he teamed with Will Smith to win the silver medal in the Men's PR3 Men's Pair.

Altschwager with Nikki Ayers won the gold medal in the PR3 Mixed Double at the 2023 World Rowing Championships in Belgrade and 2024 Summer Paralympics. They became the first Australian Paralympic rowers to win a gold medal.

He was a South Australian Sports Institute athlete, he was coached by Lizzi Chapman and a member of Torrens Rowing Club. He announced his retirement in December 2024.

In December 2024, he was selected in the second Australian Institute of Sport (AIS) Gen32 Coach Program.

== Recognition ==
- 2023 – Rowing Australia Para Crew of the Year with Nikki Ayers.
- 2023 – Rowing Australia 77BC Rower's Rower of the Year
- 2023 – World Rowing Para Crew of the Year with Nikki Ayers
- 2024 – South Australian Sports Institute Para Athlete of the Year Nikki Ayers
- 2024 – Rowing Australia Para Crew of the Year with Nikki Ayers
- 2024 – Paralympics Australia Team of the Year with Nikki Ayers
- 2024 - Medal of the Order of Australia (OAM) for service to sport as a gold medallist at the Paris Paralympic Games 2024.
- 2025 - South Australian Sports Institute Heart Award
