= Maxwell Allemeier =

American Paralympic rower (born 2005)

Personal information
- Born: October 14, 2005 (age 20)
- Home town: Marietta, Georgia, U.S.
- Height: 6 ft 1 in (185 cm)
- Weight: 185 lb (84 kg)

Sport
- Country: United States
- Sport: Pararowing
- Disability: Visual impairment
- Disability class: PR3
Medal record
Pararowing
Representing the United States
World Championships
Gold medal – first place	2026 Amsterdam	PR3 Mix4+

Maxwell Allemeier (born October 14, 2005) is an American pararower.

== Early life and education ==
Allemeier was born with a visual impairment. He attended George Walton Comprehensive High School in Marietta, Georgia.

== Career ==
In July 2024, Allemeier was selected as an alternate for the United States at the 2024 Summer Paralympics.

In August 2026, he represented the United States at the 2026 World Rowing Championships and won a gold medal in the PR3 Mixed coxed four event with a time of 6:46.60, finishing 1.27 seconds ahead of Great Britain. This marked the first title for the U.S. in the event at the World Rowing Championships, ending Great Britain's 15-year winning streak.
