= 2022 World Rowing Championships – PR3 Men's coxless pair =

PR3 Men's coxless pair at the 2022 World Rowing Championships
- Venue: Labe aréna
- Location: Račice, Czech Republic
- Dates: 19 September – 23 September
- Competitors: 10 from 5 nations
- Winning time: 6:53.68

Medalists
gold medal	Oliver Stanhope; Edward Fuller	Great Britain
silver medal	Nicholas Neales; James Talbot	Australia
bronze medal	Andrii Syvykh; Dmytro Herez	Ukraine

The PR3 men's coxless pair competition at the 2022 World Rowing Championships took place at the Račice regatta venue.

== Schedule ==
The schedule was as follows:

Date	Time	Round
Monday 19 September 2022	09:50	Heats
Friday 23 September 2022	13:38	Final A

All times are Central European Summer Time (UTC+2)

== Results ==
All boats advanced directly to Final A.

=== Heat ===
Rank	Rower	Country	Time	Notes
1	Oliver Stanhope; Edward Fuller	Great Britain	7:20.88	FA
2	Andrii Syvykh; Dmytro Herez	Ukraine	7:27.79	FA
3	Antoine Jesel; Rémy Taranto	France	7:27.90	FA
4	Nicholas Neales; James Talbot	Australia	7:45.92	FA
5	Toshihiro Nishioka; Ryohei Ariyasu	Japan	7:50.51	FA

=== Final A ===
The final determined the rankings.

Rank	Rower	Country	Time	Notes
1st place, gold medalist(s)	Oliver Stanhope; Edward Fuller	Great Britain	6:53.68	
2nd place, silver medalist(s)	Nicholas Neales; James Talbot	Australia	7:21.02	
3rd place, bronze medalist(s)	Andrii Syvykh; Dmytro Herez	Ukraine	7:29.07	
4	Antoine Jesel; Rémy Taranto	France	7:31.75	
5	Toshihiro Nishioka; Ryohei Ariyasu	Japan	7:56.73	
