= 2022 World Rowing Championships – PR3 Mixed double sculls =

PR3 Mixed double sculls at the 2022 World Rowing Championships
- Venue: Labe aréna
- Location: Račice, Czech Republic
- Dates: 19 September – 23 September
- Competitors: 12 from 6 nations
- Winning time: 7:35.04

Medalists
gold medal	Elur Alberdi; Laurent Cadot	France
silver medal	Diana Barcelos de Oliveira; Valdeni da Silva Junior	Brazil
bronze medal	Dariia Kotyk; Stanislav Samoliuk	Ukraine

The PR3 mixed double sculls competition at the 2022 World Rowing Championships took place at the Račice regatta venue.

== Schedule ==
The schedule was as follows:

Date	Time	Round
Monday 19 September 2022	09:56	Heats
Friday 23 September 2022	14:12	Final A

All times are Central European Summer Time (UTC+2)

== Results ==
All boats advanced directly to Final A.

=== Heat ===
Rank	Rower	Country	Time	Notes
1	Diana Barcelos de Oliveira; Valdeni da Silva Junior	Brazil	7:33.39	FA
2	Dariia Kotyk; Stanislav Samoliuk	Ukraine	7:37.54	FA
3	Elur Alberdi; Laurent Cadot	France	7:40.91	FA
4	Todd Vogt; Pearl Outlaw	United States	7:48.35	FA
5	Shay-Lee Mizrachi; Achiya Klein	Israel	7:48.81	FA
6	Johanna Beyer; David Erkinger	Austria	8:01.53	FA

=== Final A ===
The final determined the rankings.

Rank	Rower	Country	Time	Notes
1st place, gold medalist(s)	Elur Alberdi; Laurent Cadot	France	7:35.04	
2nd place, silver medalist(s)	Diana Barcelos de Oliveira; Valdeni da Silva Junior	Brazil	7:37.16	
3rd place, bronze medalist(s)	Dariia Kotyk; Stanislav Samoliuk	Ukraine	7:37.18	
4	Shay-Lee Mizrachi; Achiya Klein	Israel	7:42.36	
5	Todd Vogt; Pearl Outlaw	United States	7:50.80	
6	Johanna Beyer; David Erkinger	Austria	8:03.75	
