= 2018 World Rowing Championships – PR3 Men's coxless pair =

PR3 Men's coxless pair at the 2018 World Rowing Championships
- Venue: Plovdiv Regatta Venue
- Location: Plovdiv, Bulgaria
- Dates: 14 September
- Competitors: 10 from 5 nations
- Winning time: 7:12.82

Medalists
gold medal	Kyle Fredrickson; Andrew Todd	Canada
silver medal	James Talbot; Jed Altschwager	Australia
bronze medal	Jérôme Pailler; Laurent Viala	France

The PR3 men's coxless pair competition at the 2018 World Rowing Championships in Plovdiv took place at the Plovdiv Regatta Venue.

== Schedule ==
The schedule was as follows:

Date	Time	Round
Friday 14 September 2018	11:39	Final

All times are Eastern European Summer Time (UTC+3)

== Results ==
With fewer than seven entries in this event, a direct final was held to determine the rankings.

Rank	Rowers	Country	Time
1st place, gold medalist(s)	Kyle Fredrickson; Andrew Todd	Canada	7:12.82
2nd place, silver medalist(s)	James Talbot; Jed Altschwager	Australia	7:23.96
3rd place, bronze medalist(s)	Jérôme Pailler; Laurent Viala	France	7:29.08
4	Ryohei Ariyasu; Toshihiro Nishioka	Japan	8:34.24
5	Vladimir Volodin; Nikolai Samsonov	Russia	8:43.86
