= Gemma Wollenschlaeger =

American Paralympic rower

Personal information
- Nationality: American
- Born: August 11, 2003 (age 22) United Kingdom
- Home town: St. Augustine Beach, Florida, U.S.
- Education: Temple University
- Height: 5 ft 10 in (178 cm)
- Weight: 157 lb (71 kg)

Sport
- Country: United States
- Sport: Pararowing
- Disability: Clubfoot
- Disability class: PR3
Medal record
Pararowing
Representing the United States
Paralympic Games
Silver medal – second place	2024 Paris	PR3 Mix4+
World Championships
Silver medal – second place	2023 Belgrade	PR3 mixed double sculls

Gemma Wollenschlaeger (born August 11, 2003) is an American pararower. She represented the United States at the 2024 Summer Paralympics.

== Early life and education ==
Wollenschlaeger was born in the United Kingdom, raised in South Africa, and immigrated to the United States at five years old. She was born with a left clubfoot and underwent several surgeries growing up to correct her foot. She attended Archbishop Spalding High School in Severn, Maryland and rowed for the Annapolis Junior Rowing team.

She attends Temple University and is pursuing an accounting degree at Fox School of Business and Management. As a member of Temple's women's rowing team during her freshman year in 2022, she earned second-team All-AAC honors, and was named Temple's women's Rowing Newcomer of the Year. During her sophomore year in 2023, she earned first-team All-AAC honors and was named Temple's women's Rowings Athlete of the Year.

== Career ==
Wollenschlaeger made her international debut for the United States at the 2023 World Rowing Championships and won a silver medal in the PR3 mixed double sculls event with a time of 8:15.22.

On January 17, 2024, she was selected to represent the United States at the 2024 Summer Paralympics. She won a silver medal in the mixed coxed four event.
