= 2017 World Rowing Championships – PR3 Mixed double sculls =

PR3 Mixed double sculls at the 2017 World Rowing Championships
- Venue: Nathan Benderson Park
- Location: Sarasota, United States
- Dates: 27–29 September
- Competitors: 12 from 6 nations
- Winning time: 7:28.95

Medalists
gold medal	Diana Barcelos de Oliveira; Jairo Klug	Brazil
silver medal	Antoine Jesel; Guylaine Marchand	France
bronze medal	Jessica Dietz; Valentin Luz	Germany

The PR3 mixed double sculls competition at the 2017 World Rowing Championships in Sarasota took place in Nathan Benderson Park.

== Schedule ==
The schedule was as follows:

Date	Time	Round
Wednesday 27 September 2017	10:21	Exhibition race
Friday 29 September 2017	11:32	Final

All times are Eastern Daylight Time (UTC-4)

== Results ==
=== Exhibition race ===
With fewer than seven entries in this event, boats contested a race for lanes before the final.

Rank	Rowers	Country	Time	Notes
1	Antoine Jesel; Guylaine Marchand	France	7:53.70	WCHB
2	Diana Barcelos de Oliveira; Jairo Klug	Brazil	7:58.16	
3	Jessica Dietz; Valentin Luz	Germany	8:06.36	
4	Johanna Beyer; Rainer Putz	Austria	8:23.34	
5	Russell Gernaat; Natalie McCarthy	United States	8:45.09	
6	Angeles Gutierrez; Miguel Nieto	Mexico	9:21.85	

=== Final ===
The final determined the rankings.

Rank	Rowers	Country	Time	Notes
1st place, gold medalist(s)	Diana Barcelos de Oliveira; Jairo Klug	Brazil	7:28.95	WB
2nd place, silver medalist(s)	Antoine Jesel; Guylaine Marchand	France	7:34.70	
3rd place, bronze medalist(s)	Jessica Dietz; Valentin Luz	Germany	7:40.72	
4	Johanna Beyer; Rainer Putz	Austria	8:03.95	
5	Russell Gernaat; Natalie McCarthy	United States	8:21.62	
6	Angeles Gutierrez; Miguel Nieto	Mexico	8:59.82	
