= Todd Vogt =

American Paralympic rower

Personal information
- Nationality: American
- Born: August 31, 1974 (age 51) Rochester, New York, U.S.
- Home town: Portland, Oregon, U.S.
- Education: University at Buffalo
- Height: 6 ft 4 in (193 cm)
- Weight: 200 lb (91 kg)

Sport
- Sport: Pararowing
- Disability: Parkinson's disease
Medal record
Pararowing
Representing the United States
World Rowing Championships
Silver medal – second place	2023 Belgrade	PR3 mixed double sculls

Todd Vogt (born August 31, 1974) is an American pararower. He represented the United States at the 2024 Summer Paralympics.

== Early life and education ==
Vogt attended the University at Buffalo and graduated with a degree in biochemistry. He started rowing in 1992 when he saw a poster outside his freshman dorm room in college.

He was diagnosed with early onset Parkinson's disease in 2018.

== Career ==
Vogt made his international debut for the United States at the 2019 World Rowing Championships in the PR3 men's coxless pair event. He was named an alternate for the United States at the 2020 Summer Paralympics. He again represented the United States at the 2022 World Rowing Championships in the PR3 mixed doubles sculls event.

Vogt represented the United States at the 2023 World Rowing Championships and won a silver medal in the PR3 mixed double sculls event with a time of 8:15.22. On July 2, 2024, he was selected to represent the United States at the 2024 Summer Paralympics.
