= Marc Lembeck =

German para-rower (born 1989)

Personal information
- Nationality: German
- Born: 4 March 1989 (age 37)

Sport
- Sport: Para rowing, para cycling
- Disability class: PR3 (rowing); B (cycling)
Medal record
Representing Germany
Men's para rowing
World Championships
Silver medal – second place	2022 Račice	PR3 Mix4+
Bronze medal – third place	2023 Belgrade	PR3 Mix4+
Bronze medal – third place	2025 Shanghai	PR3 Mix4+
European Championships
Silver medal – second place	2023 Bled	PR3 Mix4+
Bronze medal – third place	2022 Munich	PR3 Mix4+
Men's para cycling
Track World Championships
Silver medal – second place	2026 Apeldoorn	Mixed team sprint B

Marc Lembeck (born 4 March 1989) is a visually impaired German para cyclist and former para rower and para athlete. He is a two-time Paralympian.

== Career ==
Lembeck began his career in para-athletics and represented Germany at the 2008 Summer Paralympics.

In August 2022, he competed at the 2022 European Rowing Championships and won a bronze medal in the mixed coxed four event. In September 2022, he competed at the 2022 World Rowing Championships and won a silver medal in the mixed coxed four event.

In May 2023, he competed at the 2023 European Rowing Championships and won a silver medal in the mixed coxed four event. In September 2023, he competed at the 2023 World Rowing Championships and won a bronze medal in the mixed coxed four event with a time of 7:29.74.

In July 2024, he was selected to represent Germany at the 2024 Summer Paralympics. He finished in fourth place in the mixed cox four event with a time of 7:03.17.

In September 2025, he competed at the 2025 World Rowing Championships and won a bronze medal in the mixed coxed four event with a time of 7:04.98.

In November 2025, Lembeck announced he would begin competing in para-cycling, alongside his pilot Robert Förstemann, with hopes of competing at the 2028 Summer Paralympics. In November 2026, he competed at the 2026 UCI Para-cycling Track World Championships and won a silver medal in the mixed team sprint B event in his Track World Championships debut.
