= Laurent Cadot =

French rower (born 1983)

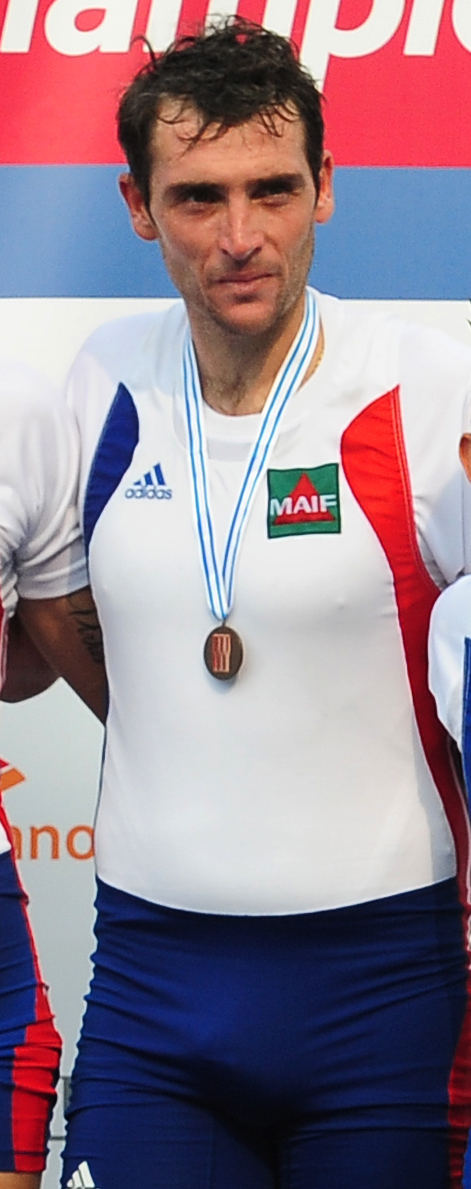
- Laurent Cadot in 2013

Personal information
- Nationality: French
- Born: 26 August 1983 (age 43) Aurillac, France

Sport
- Sport: Rowing
Medal record
Representing France
Men's rowing
World Championships
Bronze medal – third place	2013 Chungju	Coxed pair
European Championships
Bronze medal – third place	2008 Marathon	Coxless pair
Bronze medal – third place	2009 Brest	Coxless pair
Pararowing
World Championships
Gold medal – first place	2022 Račice	PR3 mixed double sculls
Bronze medal – third place	2022 Račice	PR3 mixed coxed four
Bronze medal – third place	2023 Belgrade	PR3 mixed double sculls
Bronze medal – third place	2026 Amsterdam	PR3 mixed coxed four
European Championships
Gold medal – first place	2023 Bled	PR3 mixed double sculls
Silver medal – second place	2022 Munch	PR3 mixed coxed four
Bronze medal – third place	2026 Varese	PR3 mixed coxed four

Laurent Cadot (born 26 August 1983) is a French rower. He competed at the 2004 Summer Olympics and the 2008 Summer Olympics.
