= Tobiah Goffsassen =

Australian rower (born 2006)

Personal information
- Nickname: Tobes
- Nationality: Australian
- Born: 26 June 2006 (age 20)
- Home town: Gold Coast, Queensland, Australia
- Height: 190 cm (6 ft 3 in)

Sport
- Country: Australia
- Sport: Para-rowing
- Club: University of Queensland Boat Club
- Coached by: James Loveday

Tobiah "Toby" Goffsassen (born 26 June 2006) is an Australian rower. He was a member of the PR3 Mix 4+ team at the 2024 Summer Paralympics.

== Personal ==
Tobiah Goffsassen was born on 26 June 2006. He attended The Southport School. In 2024, he is undertaking a Bachelor of Exercise and Sport Sciences (Honours) at the University of Queensland. Tobiah has two younger brothers Ben and Hugh both at TSS.

== Rowing ==
He rowed with The Southport School second XVIII at Queensland Head of The River. At the 2024 World Rowing Cup II, Lucerne, Switzerland, Goffsassen with Nicholas Bartlett, finished second in the Men's PR3 Pair. At the 2024 Paris Paralympics, he was a member of the PR3 mixed coxed four that included Susannah Lutze, Alexandra Viney, Thomas Birtwistle and Hannah Cowap (cox). This crew at their international debut at the 2024 World Rowing Cup III in Poznan, Poland finished fifth in the PR3 Mixed Coxed Four. The finished fifth at the 2024 Summer Paralympics.

In 2024, he is supported by the Queensland Academy of Sport.
