= Ben Washburne =

American Paralympic rower

Personal information
- Full name: Benjamin Washburne
- Born: April 17, 2001 (age 25) Madison, Connecticut, U.S.
- Education: Williams College
- Height: 5 ft 11 in (180 cm)
- Weight: 185 lb (84 kg)

Sport
- Country: United States
- Sport: Pararowing
- Disability: Clubfoot
- Disability class: PR3
Medal record
Pararowing
Representing the United States
Paralympic Games
Silver medal – second place	2024 Paris	PR3 Mix4+
World Championships
Silver medal – second place	2023 Belgrade	PR3 Mix4+

Benjamin Washburne (born April 17, 2001) is an American pararower. He represented the United States at the 2024 Summer Paralympics.

== Early life and education ==
Washburne was born with a left clubfoot. He underwent several surgeries, requiring him to use a wheelchair during his childhood and relearn how to walk. He broke his left leg playing soccer in gym class in fifth grade and had surgery to rebuild his foot. He attended Hopkins School in New Haven, Connecticut and began rowing in eighth grade. He also rowed for the Blood Street Sculls.

He then attended Williams College and was a member of the rowing team. He graduated with a degree in physics and economics. In 2023, he helped Williams College win the IRA Division III rowing title. Following the season he was named to the All-NESCAC second team and awarded the John A. Shaw Award in 2023.

== Career ==
Washburne made his international debut at the 2023 World Rowing Championships and won a silver medal in the PR3 Mixed coxed four event with a time of 7:25.01.

On January 19, 2024, he was selected to represent the United States at the 2024 Summer Paralympics. He won a silver medal in the mixed coxed four event.
