= Kathrin Marchand =

German rower, Para rower and cross-country skier (born 1990)

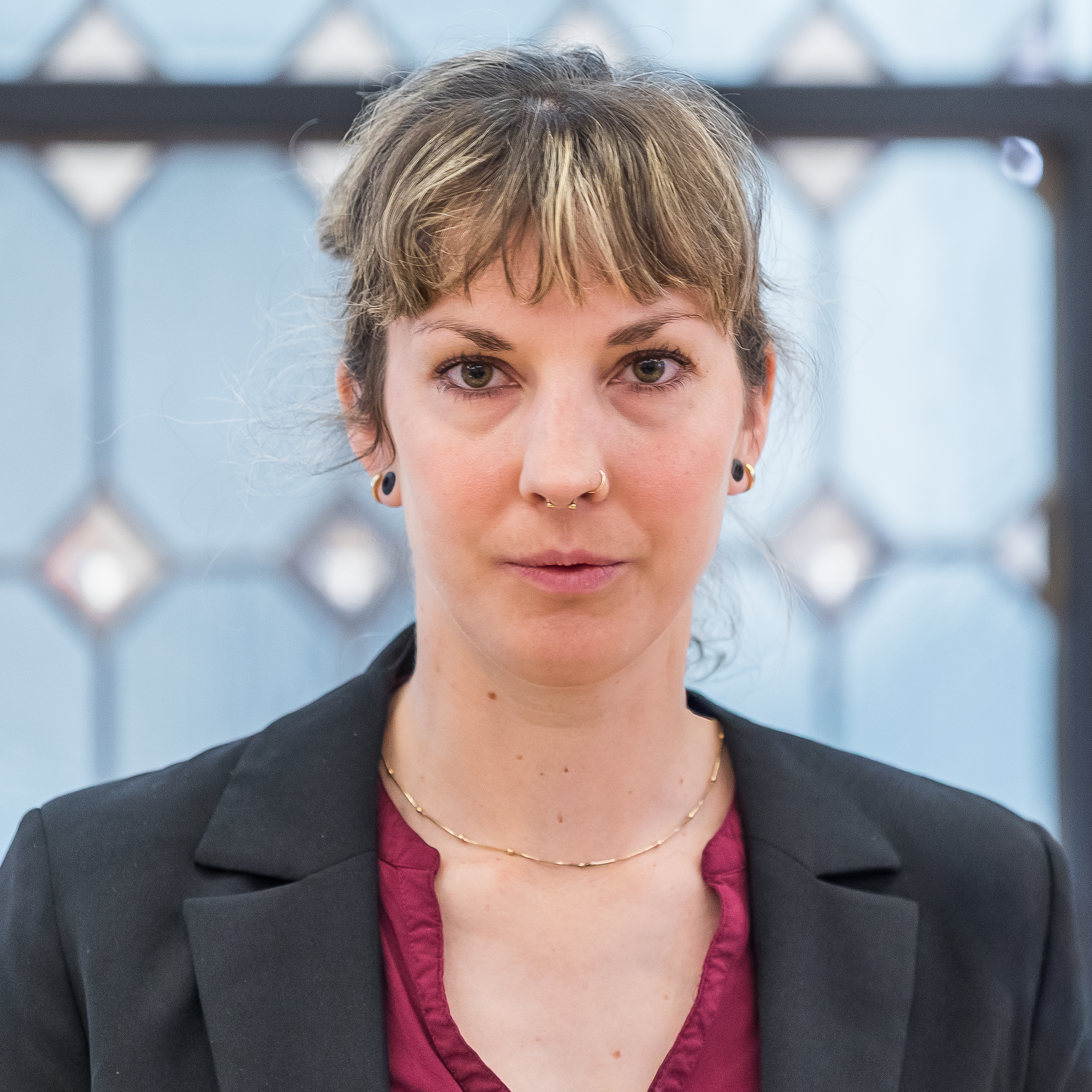
- Marchand in 2026

Personal information
- Born: 15 November 1990 (age 35) Cologne, Germany
- Height: 182 cm (6 ft 0 in)
- Weight: 75 kg (165 lb)

Sport
- Country: Germany
- Sport: Rowing, Para rowing Para cross-country skiing
- Disability class: PR3 (rowing), LW9 (skiing)
Medal record
Representing Germany
Women's rowing
European Championships
Silver medal – second place	2013 Seville	Eight
Silver medal – second place	2016 Brandenburg	Coxless pair
Bronze medal – third place	2014 Belgrade	Eight
Para rowing
World Championships
Gold medal – first place	2025 Shanghai	PR3 mixed double sculls
Gold medal – first place	2026 Amsterdam	PR3 mixed double sculls
Silver medal – second place	2022 Račice	PR3 mixed coxed four
Bronze medal – third place	2023 Belgrade	PR3 mixed coxed four
Bronze medal – third place	2025 Shanghai	PR3 mixed coxed four
European Championships
Gold medal – first place	2026 Varese	PR3 mixed double sculls
Silver medal – second place	2023 Bled	PR3 mixed coxed four
Bronze medal – third place	2022 Munich	PR3 mixed coxed four

Kathrin Marchand (born 15 November 1990) is a German rower, Para rower, Para cross-country skier and physician. She competed in the women's coxless pair event at the 2016 Summer Olympics, and the women's eight event at the 2012 Summer Olympics.

== Career ==
She was a junior world bronze medallist in the women's eight, and won the bronze medal in the event at the 2014 European Championships. In 2016, she won a European silver medal in the coxless pair with Kerstin Hartmann. She competed with Hartmann at the 2016 Summer Olympics.

After suffering a stroke, she took part in the 2022 European Rowing Championships, winning a bronze medal in the pararowing PR3Mix4+ event. In the same class, she won a silver medal in the 2022 World Rowing Championships.

She also competed in Para cross-country skiing at the FIS Nordic World Ski Championships 2025 and the 2026 Winter Paralympics.
