= Susannah Lutze =

Australian rower (born 2004)

Personal information
- Nationality: Australian
- Born: 19 May 2004 (age 22) Irvine, Scotland
- Home town: Surrey Hills, Victoria, Australia
- Height: 173 cm (5 ft 8 in)

Sport
- Country: Australia
- Sport: Para-rowing
- Club: Banks Rowing Club
- Coached by: James Loveday

Susannah Lutze (born 19 May 2004) is an Australian Paralympic rower. She competed at the 2024 Paris Paralympics.

== Personal ==
Lutze was born on 19 May 2004 at Irvine, Scotland. She was born with clubfoot. Four years of treatment improved the condition but she still has limited ankle mobility and muscle atrophy in her left leg. Her family moved from Scotland to Melbourne in 2008. She attended Camberwell Girls Grammar School and Carey Baptist Grammar School in Melbourne.

== Rowing ==
At high school, Lutze played many sports including tennis, hockey, dance, swimming and netball. She took up rowing in 2020 due to knee and ankle injuries from field sports. In 2023, she was selected for her first Australian Para Rowing Team and it won the PR3 Mix 4+ at Gavirate International Para Rowing Regatta. She is a member of the Banks Rowing Club.

At the 2024 Paris Paralympics, she was a member of the PR3 mixed coxed four that included Alexandra Viney, Tom Birtwhistle, Tobiah Goffsassen and Hannah Cowap (cox). They finished fifth.

In 2023, she was awarded a Tier 2 Scholarship within the 2024 Sport Australia Hall of Fame Scholarship and Mentoring Program.
