= Sam Murray (rower) =

British Paralympic rower

Personal information
- Full name: Samuel Murray
- Born: 30 September 1990 (age 35)

Sport
- Sport: Para-rowing
- Disability class: PR3
Medal record
Men's para-rowing
Representing Great Britain
Paralympic Games
Silver medal – second place	2024 Paris	PR3 mixed double sculls

Samuel Murray (born 30 September 1990) is a British rower, who won silver in the PR3 mixed double sculls at the 2024 Summer Paralympics in Paris.
