= Anita (para rower) =

Indian para athlete

Anita (born 5 March 1995) is an Indian para rower from Rajasthan. She qualified for the 2024 Summer Paralympics along with Narayana Konganapalle at the World Rowing Asian and Oceanian Olympic and Paralympic Qualification 2024. She won a silver medal in the PR3 mixed doubles sculls earlier, along with Narayana, at the 2022 Asian Para Games at Hangzhou, China.

== Early life ==
Anita is a road accident amputee. She is coached by Subedar Mohammed Azad at the Army Rowing Node in Pune.
