= Hermine Krumbein =

German Paralympic rower

Personal information
- Born: 25 September 2003 (age 22) Braunschweig, Germany

Sport
- Country: Germany
- Sport: Pararowing
- Disability class: PR3
Medal record
Pararowing
Representing Germany
Paralympic Games
Bronze medal – third place	2024 Paris	PR2 Mix2x
World Championships
Bronze medal – third place	2025 Shanghai	PR3Mix4+
European Championships
Silver medal – second place	2024 Szeged	PR3 Mix2x

Hermine Krumbein (born 25 September 2003) is a German pararower. She represented Germany at the 2024 Summer Paralympics.

== Career ==
Krumbein represented Germany at the 2024 Summer Paralympics and won a bronze medal in the mixed double sculls event.
