= Jan Helmich =

German Paralympic rower

Personal information
- Born: 11 May 1998 (age 28) Dortmund, Germany

Sport
- Country: Germany
- Sport: Pararowing
- Disability class: PR3
Medal record
Pararowing
Representing Germany
Paralympic Games
Bronze medal – third place	2024 Paris	PR2 Mix2x
World Championships
Silver medal – second place	2022 Račice	PR3 Mix4+
Bronze medal – third place	2023 Belgrade	PR3 Mix4+
European Championships
Silver medal – second place	2022 Munich	PR3Mix4+
Silver medal – second place	2023 Bled	PR3Mix4+
Silver medal – second place	2024 Szeged	PR3 Mix2x

Jan Helmich (born 11 May 1998) is a German pararower. He represented Germany at the 2024 Summer Paralympics.

== Career ==
Helmich represented Germany at the 2024 Summer Paralympics and won a bronze medal in the mixed double sculls event.
