= Ashtonfield =

- Suburb
- Country: Australia
- State: New South Wales
- City: Maitland
- LGA: City of Maitland

Government
  - State electorate: Maitland
  - Federal division: Paterson

Population
  - Total: 4,589 (2021 census)
- Postcode: 2323
Suburbs around Ashtonfield
East Maitland	Metford	Thornton
East Maitland, Louth Park	Ashtonfield
Four Mile Creek, Louth Park	Four Mile Creek	Four Mile Creek

Ashtonfield is a suburb in the City of Maitland, New South Wales, Australia.

== Population ==
According to the 2021 census of Population, there were 4,589 people in Ashtonfield.

- Aboriginal and Torres Strait Islander people made up 4.7% of the population.
- 85.2% of people were born in Australia and 88.5% of people only spoke English at home.
- The most common responses for religion were No Religion 36.2%, Catholic 21.5% and Anglican 19.3%.

== Education ==
Ashtonfield Public School is a government primary school which opened in 2007 on Norfolk Street.

== Facilities ==
Stockland Green Hills is a shopping centre in the neighbouring suburb of East Maitland.

Bloomfield Colliery is an open cut mine operating in Ashtonfield.
