= Annie Caddick =

British Paralympic rower

Personal information
- Full name: Annabel Caddick
- Born: 21 May 1999 (age 27)

Sport
- Sport: Para-rowing
- Disability class: PR3
Medal record
Women's para-rowing
Representing Great Britain
Paralympic Games
Silver medal – second place	2024 Paris	PR3 mixed double sculls

Annabel Caddick (born 21 May 1999) is a British rower, who won silver in the PR3 mixed double sculls at the 2024 Summer Paralympics in Paris.
