= Narayana Konganapalle =

Indian para athlete

Narayana Konganapalle is an Indian para rower from Andhra Pradesh. He qualified for the 2024 Summer Paralympics along with Anita in at the World Rowing Asian and Oceanian Olympic and Paralympic Qualification 2024. Earlier, he won a silver medal in PR3 mixed doubles sculls along with Anita at the 2022 Asian Para Games at Hangzhou, China.

== Early life ==
Konganapalle is a havaldar in the Indian Army. He is from Nandyal, Andhra Pradesh. He is a land mine blast survivor. He is coached by Subedar Mohammed Azad at the Army Rowing Node in Pune. He belongs to Madras Engineering Group and entered the Army in 2007.
