= Teesaan Koo =

Australian rowing cox

Personal information
- Born: 12 December 1974 (age 50)
- Years active: 1994–2023

Sport
- Country: Australia
- Sport: Rowing
- Club: Mosman Rowing Club; Melbourne University Boat Club
- Coached by: Gordon Marcks

Teesaan Koo (born 12 December 1974) is an Australian representative rowing coxswain. He has represented at World Championships spanning a twenty-nine year period from 1994 to 2023.

== Club and state rowing ==
Over a long career Koo coxed at a number of senior clubs in Sydney and Melbourne including the Mosman Rowing Club and the Melbourne University Boat Club.

In Mosman colours he won an Australian national championship in 1994 in the senior men's coxed pair and a senior B men's eight title in 1995.

== International representative rowing ==
Koo's Australian representative debut was in 1994 when he steered the Australian men's coxed pair at the 1994 World Rowing Championships in Indianapolis to a tenth placing. The following year he again coxed Australia's M2+ at the 1995 World Rowing Championships in Tampere, Finland where they made the A final and finished fourth.

In 2022 Koo was selected in the Australian paralympic training squad to prepare for the 2022 World Rowing Championships. At the 2022 World Rowing Championships at Racize, he coxed the Australian Mixed PR3 four. They made the A final and finished in fourth place. At the 2023 World Rowing Championships, Koo and his crew finished fourth in the PR3 Mixed Coxed Four.
