= Para rowing =

Sport of rowing adapted for disabled people

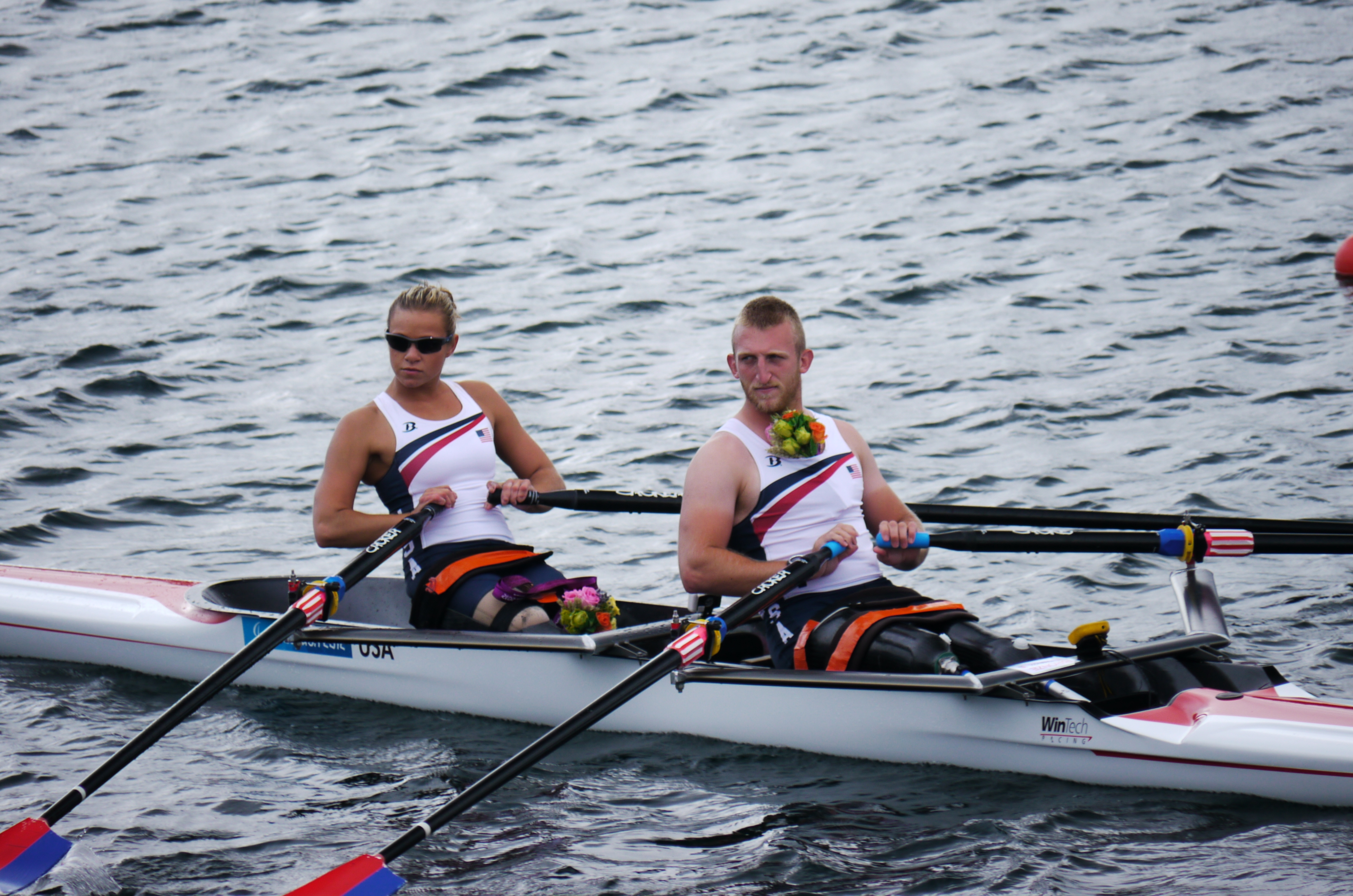
Oksana Masters & Rob Jones of the US in the mixed sculls (TA 2x) final at the Paralympics, London 2012. The rowers are fixed to the seat.

Para rowing (or adaptive rowing) is a category of rowing race for those with physical, visual or intellectual disabilities.The sports’ governing body is FISA (World Rowing), a member of the International Paralympic Committee, that oversees both rowing and Para rowing. The federation established guidelines and competition formats for Para rowing in 2001, starting their journey towards the Paralympic Games. The first time the sport was raced was at the 2002 World Rowing Championship in Seville.

== History ==
In 1913, rowing for individuals with disabilities was initiated by headmaster George Clifford Brown at Worcester College for the Blind in Great Britain. Brown encouraged visually impaired students to participate in particular sports in which they would be able to compete at an equal level to sighted players and do so without modifications. Other organizations dedicated to rehabilitating the blind, such as St. Dunstan's Hostel, started rowing clubs shortly afterwards in 1915. Competitive rowing with blind rowers first began in 1914 between Worcester College and the Old Boys in one race and Worcester College and Worcester Boy Scouts in another race the same year.

In October 1945, veterans from the United States Army, Navy, and Marines blinded during WWII entered into the Navy Day Regatta on the Schuylkill River in Philadelphia. Some consider this event as the catalyst for international interest of adaptive rowing.

The sport made its debut at the Beijing 2008 Paralympic Games, featuring 90 athletes across 4 events. The competition format over 1,000 meters remained unchanged until the Tokyo 2020 Paralympic Games when the distance was doubled, with a standard race distance of 2000 meters. The 2024 Paris Paralympic Games introduced a fifth event, which was PR 3 mixed double sculls and the Games in LA28 aim to be the first ones to hold five Para rowing, gender balanced events.

== Classes ==
Classification determines the eligibility of the athletes to race in Para rowing and assigns eligible athletes to the respective sport class. Under World Rowing rules there are three categories for adaptive rowers:

PR3 (previously LTA – Legs, Trunk, Arms)
Use of at least one leg, trunk and arms. Also for those with visual and intellectual impairments. Rowed with standard boats and sliding seats.
PR2 (previously TA – Trunk and Arms)
Only use of trunk muscles. Boat has fixed seat.
PR1 (previously AS – Arms and Shoulders)
Limited trunk control. Boat has fixed seat and rower is strapped at upper chest level to only allow shoulder and arm movements.

== Events ==
At FISA World Championships there are now 9 boat events (standard nomenclature is used).

Adaptive Rowing Events
| Boat Type | Seat Count | Sex | Coxed | Class | FISA Notation | FISA World Championships | Paralympic Games |
|---|---|---|---|---|---|---|---|
| Scull | 1 | Men | No | PR1 | PR1 M1x | Yes | Yes |
| Scull | 1 | Women | No | PR1 | PR1 W1x | Yes | Yes |
| Scull | 1 | Men | No | PR2 | PR2 M1x | Yes | No |
| Scull | 1 | Women | No | PR2 | PR2 W1x | Yes | No |
| Scull | 2 | Mixed | No | PR2 | PR2 Mix2x | Yes | Yes |
| Scull | 2 | Mixed | No | PR3 | PR3 Mix2x | Yes | Yes |
| Sweep | 2 | Men | No | PR3 | PR3 M2- | Yes | No |
| Sweep | 2 | Women | No | PR3 | PR3 W2- | Yes | No |
| Sweep | 4 | Mixed | Yes | PR3 | PR3 Mix4+ | Yes | Yes |

Racing was held over 1,000 m (rather than the standard 2,000 m), but from 2017 the distance was changed to the standard 2,000m. In mixed events half the crew must be male and other half female (coxswain may be of either gender and may be able bodied). Single shells for the PR1 category must have stabilising pontoons attached to the riggers.

Adaptive events were added to the World Rowing Championships in 2002 and took place at the 2008 Summer Paralympics in Beijing, China.
