= 2019 European Rowing Championships =

Watersports competition

- Venue: Rotsee
- Location: Lucerne, Switzerland
- Dates: 31 May to 2 June

The 2019 European Rowing Championships was held in Lucerne, Switzerland from 31 May to 2 June 2019.

== Medal summary ==
=== Men ===
Event	Gold	Time	Silver	Time	Bronze	Time
M1x	Oliver Zeidler; Germany	6:47.32	Stef Broenink; Netherlands	6:47.51	Pilip Pavukou; Belarus	6:47.72
M2-	Croatia (CRO); Martin Sinković; Valent Sinković	6:22.46	Romania (ROU); Marius Cozmiuc; Ciprian Tudosă	6:24.53	Spain (ESP); Jaime Canalejo; Javier García Ordóñez	6:26.31
M2x	Poland (POL); Mirosław Ziętarski; Fabian Barański	6:13.51	Switzerland (SUI); Barnabé Delarze; Roman Röösli	6:13.60	Romania (ROU); Ioan Prundeanu; Marian Enache	6:13.96
M4-	Great Britain (GBR); Oliver Cook; Matthew Rossiter; Rory Gibbs; Sholto Carnegie	5:51.01	Poland (POL); Mikołaj Burda; Mateusz Wilangowski; Marcin Brzeziński; Michał Szpakowski	5:53.90	Germany (GER); Felix Brummel; Felix Wimberger; Max Planer; Nico Merget	5:56.08
M4x	Netherlands (NED); Dirk Uittenbogaard; Abe Wiersma; Tone Wieten; Koen Metsemakers	5:35.75	Italy (ITA); Filippo Mondelli; Andrea Panizza; Luca Rambaldi; Giacomo Gentili	5:40.19	Great Britain (GBR); Jack Beaumont; Jonathan Walton; Angus Groom; Peter Lambert	5:41.89
M8+	Germany (GER); Johannes Weißenfeld; Laurits Follert; Jakob Schneider; Torben Johannesen; Christopher Reinhardt; Malte Jakschik; Richard Schmidt; Hannes Ocik; Martin Sauer	5:25.68	Great Britain (GBR); Thomas Ford; James Rudkin; Thomas George; Moe Sbihi; Jacob Dawson; Oliver Wynne-Griffith; Matthew Tarrant; Josh Bugajski; Henry Fieldman	5:26.55	Netherlands (NED); Vincent van der Want; Boudewijn Röell; Jasper Tissen; Ruben Knab; Mechiel Versluis; Bram Schwarz; Bjorn van den Ende; Robert Lücken; Aranka Kops	5:27.97
Men's lightweight events
LM1x	Péter Galambos; Hungary	6:57.00	Artur Mikołajczewski; Poland	6:58.98	Martino Goretti; Italy	7:02.27
LM2x	Germany (GER); Jonathan Rommelmann; Jason Osborne	6:12.58	Italy (ITA); Stefano Oppo; Pietro Ruta	6:13.95	Belgium (BEL); Tim Brys; Niels Van Zandweghe	6:15.51
LM4x	Italy (ITA); Catello Amarante II; Lorenzo Fontana; Alfonso Scalzone; Gabriel Soares	5:55.4	Netherlands (NED); Hilmar Verbeek; David Kampman; Ward van Zeijl; Bart Lukkes	5:56.89	France (FRA); Léo Grandsire; Hugo Beurey; Benjamin David; Ferdinand Ludwig	5:57.05

=== Women ===
Event	Gold	Time	Silver	Time	Bronze	Time
W1x	Sanita Pušpure; Ireland	7:23.18	Jeannine Gmelin; Switzerland	7:24.04	Miroslava Knapková; Czech Republic	7:24.85
W2-	Spain (ESP); Aina Cid; Virginia Diaz Rivas	7:14.14	Romania (ROU); Adriana Ailincai; Maria Tivodariu	7:15.52	Italy (ITA); Kiri Tontodonati; Aisha Rocek	7:16.22
W2x	Germany (GER); Leonie Menzel; Carlotta Nwajide	6:49.23	Romania (ROU); Nicoleta-Ancuţa Bodnar; Simona Radiș	6:50.56	Italy (ITA); Stefania Buttignon; Stefania Gobbi	6:51.38
W4-	Netherlands (NED); Ellen Hogerwerf; Karolien Florijn; Ymkje Clevering; Veronique Meester	6:24.84	Romania (ROU); Ioana Vrînceanu; Viviana Bejinariu; Mădălina Bereș; Denisa Tîlvescu	6:27.92	Poland (POL); Joanna Dittmann; Monika Chabel; Olga Michałkiewicz; Maria Wierzbowska	6:32.37
W4x	Germany (GER); Michaela Staelberg; Julia Lier; Franziska Kampmann; Frieda Hämmerling	6:16.69	Netherlands (NED); Roos de Jong; Inge Janssen; Sophie Souwer; Olivia van Rooijen	6:17.08	Ukraine (UKR); Yevheniya Dovhodko; Daryna Verkhohliad; Anastasiya Kozhenkova; Yana Dementyeva	6:18.82
W8+	Romania (ROU); Cristina-Georgiana Popescu; Amalia Bereș; Mădălina-Gabriela Cașu; Roxana Parascanu; Beatrice-Mădălina Parfenie; Iuliana Popa; Maria-Magdalena Rusu; Roxana-Iuliana Anghel; Daniela Druncea	6:03.49	Great Britain (GBR); Fiona Gammond; Zoe Lee; Josephine Wratten; Harriet Taylor; Rowan McKellar; Rebecca Shorten; Karen Bennett; Holly Norton; Matilda Horn	6:03.55	Russia (RUS); Vasilisa Stepanova; Elizaveta Kovina; Ekaterina Potapova; Anna Karpova; Olga Zaruba; Anastasia Tikhanova; Ekaterina Sevostianova; Elena Oriabinskaia; Elizaveta Krylova	6:06.38
Women's lightweight events
LW1x	Federica Cesarini; Italy	7:32.45	Leonie Pieper; Germany	7:34.17	Marieke Keijser; Netherlands	7:36.59
LW2x	Belarus (BLR); Anastasiia Ianina; Alena Furman	6:58.69	France (FRA); Laura Tarantola; Claire Bove	7:00.29	Switzerland (SUI); Patricia Merz; Frédérique Rol	7:02.63

=== Medal table ===
Host nation

Rank	Nation	Gold	Silver	Bronze	Total
1	Germany (GER)	5	1	1	7
2	Netherlands (NED)	2	3	2	7
3	Italy (ITA)	2	2	3	7
4	Romania (ROU)	1	4	1	6
5	Great Britain (GBR)	1	2	1	4
5	Poland (POL)	1	2	1	4
7	Belarus (BLR)	1	0	1	2
7	Spain (ESP)	1	0	1	2
9	Croatia (CRO)	1	0	0	1
9	Hungary (HUN)	1	0	0	1
9	Ireland (IRL)	1	0	0	1
12	Switzerland (SUI)*	0	2	1	3
13	France (FRA)	0	1	1	2
14	Belgium (BEL)	0	0	1	1
14	Czech Republic (CZE)	0	0	1	1
14	Russia (RUS)	0	0	1	1
14	Ukraine (UKR)	0	0	1	1
Totals (17 entries)		17	17	17	51
