= 2025 World Rowing Championships – Men's single sculls =

Men's single sculls at the 2025 World Rowing Championships
- Venue: Dianshan Lake
- Location: Shanghai, China
- Dates: 22–28 September
- Competitors: 30 from 30 nations
- Winning time: 6:36.75

Medalists
gold medal	Stefanos Ntouskos	Greece
silver medal	Oliver Zeidler	Germany
bronze medal	Yauheni Zalaty	Individual Neutral Athletes

The men's single sculls competition at the 2025 World Rowing Championships took place at Dianshan Lake, in Shanghai.

== Schedule ==
The schedule was as follows:

Date	Time	Round
Monday 22 September 2025	14:31	Heats
Wednesday, 24 September 2025	10:40	Quarterfinals
Wednesday, 24 September 2025	11:48	Final E
Friday, 26 September 2025	12:05	Final D
Friday, 26 September 2025	12:17	Final C
Friday, 26 September 2025	12:49	Semifinals
Sunday 28 September 2025	13:25	Final B
Sunday 28 September 2025	14:31	Final A

All times are UTC+08:00

== Results ==
=== Heats ===
The two fastest boats in each heat and the fourteen fastest times advanced directly to the quarterfinals. The remaining boats were sent to the Final E.

==== Heat 1 ====
Rank	Rower	Country	Time	Notes
1	Simon van Dorp	Netherlands	6:43.03	Q
2	Stefanos Ntouskos	Greece	6:45.09	Q
3	Bastian Secher	Denmark	6:48.35	Q
4	Cezary Litka	Poland	6:59.13	Q
5	Fedi Ben Hammouda	Tunisia	7:02.60	FE
6	Abdalla Ahmed	Sudan	7:16.55	FE

==== Heat 2 ====
Rank	Rower	Country	Time	Notes
1	Yauheni Zalaty	Individual Neutral Athletes	6:43.88	Q
2	Bendegúz Pétervári-Molnár	Hungary	6:46.32	Q
3	Davide Mumolo	Italy	6:46.94	Q
4	Ivan Corsunov	Moldova	6:50.00	Q
5	David Šain	Croatia	6:53.91	Q
6	Kheng Aik Ong	Malaysia	8:19.68	FE

==== Heat 3 ====
Rank	Rower	Country	Time	Notes
1	Bruno Cetraro	Uruguay	6:44.44	Q
2	Konan Pazzaia	Ireland	6:45.99	Q
3	Lorenz Lindorfer	Austria	6:48.67	Q
4	Giedrius Bieliauskas	Lithuania	6:52.01	Q
5	Park Hyun-su	South Korea	7:06.15	FE
6	Seifeldeen Muhammad	Egypt	7:14.19	FE

==== Heat 4 ====
Rank	Rower	Country	Time	Notes
1	Oliver Zeidler	Germany	6:44.91	Q
2	Mihai Chiruță	Romania	6:45.30	Q
3	Marlon Colpaert	Belgium	6:48.87	Q
4	Mikhail Kushteyn	Estonia	6:49.02	Q
5	Lucas Verthein	Brazil	6:57.36	Q
6	Samuel Oskarsson	Sweden	7:00.15	Q

==== Heat 5 ====
Rank	Rower	Country	Time	Notes
1	Wei Han	China	6:51.40	Q
2	Logan Ullrich	New Zealand	6:52.95	Q
3	Thomas Barras	Great Britain	6:54.66	Q
4	Maurin Lange	Switzerland	6:55.58	Q
5	Filip-Matej Pfeifer	Slovenia	6:58.35	Q
6	Bakr Al-Dulaimi	Iraq	7:09.92	R

=== Quarterfinals ===
The three fastest boats in each heat advance to the semifinals. The remaining boats were sent to the Final C and Final D.

==== Quarterfinal 1 ====
Rank	Rower	Country	Time	Notes
1	Giedrius Bieliauskas	Lithuania	7:13.81	SF
2	Simon van Dorp	Netherlands	7:13.86	SF
3	Ivan Corsunov	Moldova	7:16.87	SF
4	Konan Pazzaia	Ireland	7:22.97	FC
5	Bendegúz Pétervári-Molnár	Hungary	7:23.85	FC
6	Samuel Oskarsson	Sweden	7:25.99	FD

==== Quarterfinal 2 ====
Rank	Rower	Country	Time	Notes
1	Yauheni Zalaty	Individual Neutral Athletes	7:11.20	SF
2	Logan Ullrich	New Zealand	7:14.01	SF
3	Mihai Chiruță	Romania	7:16.34	SF
4	David Šain	Croatia	7:20.75	FC
5	Mikhail Kushteyn	Estonia	7:30.54	FD
6	Cezary Litka	Poland	7:45.46	FD

==== Quarterfinal 3 ====
Rank	Rower	Country	Time	Notes
1	Stefanos Ntouskos	Greece	7:10.80	SF
2	Bruno Cetraro	Uruguay	7:15.48	SF
3	Filip-Matej Pfeifer	Slovenia	7:16.47	SF
4	Davide Mumolo	Italy	7:19.52	FC
5	Marlon Colpaert	Belgium	7:22.12	FC
6	Thomas Barras	Great Britain	7:31.97	FD

==== Quarterfinal 4 ====
Rank	Rower	Country	Time	Notes
1	Oliver Zeidler	Germany	7:13.98	SF
2	Lorenz Lindorfer	Austria	7:16.53	SF
3	Bastian Secher	Denmark	7:19.63	SF
4	Lucas Verthein	Brazil	7:23.00	FC
5	Wei Han	China	7:35.40	FD
6	Maurin Lange	Switzerland	7:45.93	FD

=== Semifinals ===
The three fastest boats in each heat advance to the Final A. The remaining boats were sent to the Final B.

==== Semifinal 1 ====
Rank	Rower	Country	Time	Total rank
1	Oliver Zeidler	Germany	6:52.52	FA
2	Simon van Dorp	Netherlands	6:53.51	FA
3	Stefanos Ntouskos	Greece	6:53.62	FA
4	Mihai Chiruță	Romania	6:58.77	FB
5	Bastian Secher	Denmark	7:04.42	FB
6	Lorenz Lindorfer	Austria	7:10.24	FB

==== Semifinal 2 ====
Rank	Rower	Country	Time	Total rank
1	Yauheni Zalaty	Individual Neutral Athletes	6:54.29	FA
2	Bruno Cetraro	Uruguay	6:56.99	FA
3	Giedrius Bieliauskas	Lithuania	6:57.27	FA
4	Logan Ullrich	New Zealand	6:58.49	FB
5	Ivan Corsunov	Moldova	7:15.78	FB
6	Filip-Matej Pfeifer	Slovenia	7:33.28	FB

=== Finals ===
The A final determined the rankings for places 1 to 6. Additional rankings were determined in the other finals.

==== Final E ====
Rank	Rower	Country	Time	Total rank
1	Fedi Ben Hammouda	Tunisia	7:09.75	25
2	Bakr Al-Dulaimi	Iraq	7:09.79	26
3	Park Hyun-su	South Korea	7:19.66	27
4	Seifeldeen Muhammad	Egypt	7:30.25	28
5	Abdalla Ahmed	Sudan	7:31.93	29
6	Kheng Aik Ong	Malaysia	8:41.61	30

==== Final D ====
Rank	Rower	Country	Time	Total rank
1	Mikhail Kushteyn	Estonia	7:03.66	19
2	Maurin Lange	Switzerland	7:06.43	20
3	Thomas Barras	Great Britain	7:11.17	21
4	Samuel Oskarsson	Sweden	7:14.91	22
5	Han Wei	China	7:17.78	23
6	Cezary Litka	Poland	7:29.62	24

==== Final C ====
Rank	Rower	Country	Time	Total rank
1	Davide Mumolo	Italy	7:01.44	13
2	Konan Pazaia	Ireland	7:04.08	14
3	Bendegúz Pétervári-Molnár	Hungary	7:04.71	15
4	Marlon Colpaert	Belgium	7:05.02	16
5	David Šain	Croatia	7:08.78	17
6	Lucas Verthein	Brazil	7:20.68	18

==== Final B ====
Rank	Rower	Country	Time	Total rank
1	Mihai Chiruță	Romania	6:56.71	7
2	Bastian Secher	Denmark	6:58.10	8
3	Logan Ullrich	New Zealand	6:58.55	9
4	Lorenz Lindorfer	Austria	7:01.18	10
5	Ivan Corsunov	Moldova	7:08.33	11
6	Filip-Matej Pfeifer	Slovenia	7:18.45	12

==== Final A ====
Rank	Rower	Country	Time	Notes
1st place, gold medalist(s)	Stefanos Ntouskos	Greece	6:36.75	
2nd place, silver medalist(s)	Oliver Zeidler	Germany	6:37.17	
3rd place, bronze medalist(s)	Yauheni Zalaty	Individual Neutral Athletes	6:38.60	
4	Simon van Dorp	Netherlands	6:40.53	
5	Giedrius Bieliauskas	Lithuania	6:48.08	
6	Bruno Cetraro	Uruguay	7:08.50	
