= Rowing at the 2024 Summer Olympics – Men's single sculls =

Men's single sculls at the Games of the XXXIII Olympiad
- Venue: Stade nautique de Vaires-sur-Marne, National Olympic Nautical Stadium of Île-de-France, Vaires-sur-Marne
- Dates: 27 July – 3 August 2024
- Competitors: from 33 nations
- Winning time: 6:55.92

Medalists
1st place, gold medalist(s)		Oliver Zeidler	Germany
2nd place, silver medalist(s)		Yauheni Zalaty	Individual Neutral Athletes
3rd place, bronze medalist(s)		Simon van Dorp	Netherlands

The men's single sculls event at the 2024 Summer Olympics took place from 27 July to 3 August 2024 at the Stade nautique de Vaires-sur-Marne, National Olympic Nautical Stadium of Île-de-France in Vaires-sur-Marne. 33 rowers from 33 nations competed.

== Background ==
This was the 29th appearance of the event, which was not held at the first Games in 1896 (when bad weather forced the cancellation of all rowing events) but has been held at every Summer Olympics since 1900.

== Qualification ==
Each National Olympic Committee (NOC) has been limited to a single boat (one rower) in the event since 1912.

== Competition format ==
This rowing event is a single scull event, meaning that each boat is propelled by a single rower. The "scull" portion means that the rower uses two oars, one on each side of the boat; this contrasts with sweep rowing in which each rower has one oar and rows on only one side (not feasible for singles events). The competition consists of multiple rounds. The competition continues to use the five-round format introduced in 2012. Finals are held to determine the placing of each boat; these finals are given letters with those nearer to the beginning of the alphabet meaning a better ranking. Semifinals are named based on which finals they fed, with each semifinal having two possible finals. The course uses the 2000 metres distance that became the Olympic standard in 1912.

During the first round six heats are held. The first three boats in each heat advance to the quarterfinals, while all others are relegated to the repechages.

The repechage is a round which offers rowers a second chance to qualify for the quarterfinals. Placing in the repechage heats determines which quarterfinal the boat would race in. The top two boats in each repechage heat move on to the quarterfinals, with the remaining boats going to the E/F semifinals.

The four quarterfinals are the second round for rowers still competing for medals. Placing in the quarterfinal heats determines which semifinal the boat would race in. The top three boats in each quarterfinal move on to the A/B semifinals, with the bottom three boats going to the C/D semifinals.

Six semifinals are held, two each of A/B semifinals, C/D semifinals, and E/F semifinals. For each semifinal race, the top three boats move on to the better of the two finals, while the bottom three boats go to the lesser of the two finals possible. For example, a second-place finish in an A/B semifinal would result in advancement to the A final.

The fifth and final round is the finals. Each final determines a set of rankings. The A final determines the medals, along with the rest of the places through 6th. The B final gives rankings from 7th to 12th, the C from 13th to 18th, and so on. Thus, to win a medal rowers have to finish in the top three of their heat (or top two of their repechage heat), top three of their quarterfinal, and top three of their A/B semifinal to reach the A final.

== Schedule ==
The competition was held over eight days. Times given are session start times; multiple rowing events might have races during a session.

All times are Central European Summer Time (UTC+2)

Date	Time	Round
Saturday, 27 July 2024	9:00	Heats
Sunday, 28 July 2024	9:36	Repechage
Monday, 29 July 2024	9:30	Semifinals E/F
Tuesday, 30 July 2024	10:10	Quarterfinals
Wednesday, 31 July 2024	9:54	Semifinals C/D
Thursday, 1 August 2024	9:50	Semifinals A/B
Friday, 2 August 2024	9:30	Final F
Friday, 2 August 2024	9:54	Final E
Friday, 2 August 2024	10:18	Final D
Saturday, 3 August 2024	9:42	Final C
Saturday, 3 August 2024	10:06	Final B
Saturday, 3 August 2024	10:30	Final A

== Results ==
=== Heats ===
The first three of each heat qualify for the quarterfinals, while the remainder go to the repechage.

==== Heat 1 ====
Rank	Lane	Rower	Nation	Time	Notes
1	5	Tom Mackintosh	New Zealand	6:55.92	Q
2	1	Stefanos Ntouskos	Greece	7:01.79	Q
3	2	Abdelkhalek El-Banna	Egypt	7:05.06	Q
4	3	Balraj Panwar	India	7:07.11	R
5	6	Vladislav Yakovlev	Kazakhstan	7:21.56	R
6	4	André Matias	Angola	7:52.78	R

==== Heat 2 ====
Rank	Lane	Rower	Nation	Time	Notes
1	4	Mihai Chiruta	Romania	6:51.51	Q
2	5	Damir Martin	Croatia	6:54.83	Q
3	1	Giedrius Bieliauskias	Lithuania	7:00.96	Q
4	6	Isak Žvegelj	Slovenia	7:01.23	R
5	2	La Memo	Indonesia	7:19.33	R
6	3	Abdalla Ahmed	Sudan	7:46.45	R

==== Heat 3 ====
Rank	Lane	Rower	Nation	Time	Notes
1	3	Simon van Dorp	Netherlands	6:49.93	Q
2	5	Ryuta Arakawa	Japan	6:51.59	Q
3	1	Tim Brys	Belgium	6:52.35	Q
4	2	Sid Ali Boudina	Algeria	7:02.94	R
5	6	Mohamed Taieb	Tunisia	7:10.13	R
6	4	Premanut Wattananusith	Thailand	7:25.76	R

==== Heat 4 ====
Rank	Lane	Rower	Nation	Time	Notes
1	4	Yauheni Zalaty	Individual Neutral Athletes	6:51.45	Q
2	3	James Plihal	United States	6:54.95	Q
3	1	Lucas Verthein	Brazil	6:54.96	Q
4	5	Quentin Antognelli	Monaco	7:02.15	R
5	2	Dara Alizadeh	Bermuda	7:23.70	R

==== Heat 5 ====
Rank	Lane	Rower	Nation	Time	Notes
1	4	Oliver Zeidler	Germany	6:54.72	Q
2	3	Bruno Cetraro	Uruguay	7:04.04	Q
3	1	Reidy Cardona Blanco	Cuba	7:06.45	Q
4	2	Stephen Cox	Zimbabwe	7:11.98	R
5	5	Mohamed Bukrah	Libya	7:37.75	R

==== Heat 6 ====
Rank	Lane	Rower	Nation	Time	Notes
1	2	Sverri Nielsen	Denmark	6:53.50	Q
2	5	Kristian Vasiliev	Bulgaria	6:56.63	Q
3	1	Bendeguz Petervari-Molnar	Hungary	6:58.76	Q
4	3	Chiu Hin Chun	Hong Kong	7:00.29	R
5	4	Javier Insfran	Paraguay	7:14.14	R

=== Repechage ===
The first two in each heat qualify for the quarterfinals; the rest go to Semifinals E/F (out of medal contention).

==== Repechage heat 1 ====
Rank	Lane	Rower	Nation	Time	Notes
1	3	Isak Žvegelj	Slovenia	7:06.90	Q
2	5	Javier Insfran	Paraguay	7:08.29	Q
3	2	Mohamed Taieb	Tunisia	7:11.57	E/F
4	4	Stephen Cox	Zimbabwe	7:22.45	E/F
5	1	André Matias	Angola	8:01.98	E/F

==== Repechage heat 2 ====
Rank	Lane	Rower	Nation	Time	Notes
1	4	Quentin Antognelli	Monaco	7:10.00	Q
2	2	Balraj Panwar	India	7:12.41	Q
3	3	La Memo	Indonesia	7:19.60	E/F
4	1	Premanut Wattananusith	Thailand	7:29.89	E/F
5	5	Mohamed Bukrah	Libya	7:45.55	E/F

==== Repechage heat 3 ====
Rank	Lane	Rower	Nation	Time	Notes
1	4	Sid Ali Boudina	Algeria	7:10.23	Q
2	3	Chiu Hin Chun	Hong Kong	7:12.94	Q
3	5	Dara Alizadeh	Bermuda	7:17.05	E/F
4	2	Vladislav Yakovlev	Kazakhstan	7:21.12	E/F
5	1	Abdalla Ahmed	Sudan	7:55.79	E/F

=== Quarterfinals ===
The first three of each heat qualify to the semifinals A/B, remaining Crews to Semifinal C/D

==== Quarterfinal 1 ====
Rank	Lane	Rower	Nation	Time	Notes
1	3	Tom Mackintosh	New Zealand	6:48.01	QAB
2	4	Sverri Nielsen	Denmark	6:49.69	QAB
3	2	Bruno Cetraro	Uruguay	6:51.43	QAB
4	5	Lucas Verthein	Brazil	6:55.36	QCD
5	1	Quentin Antognelli	Monaco	6:58.89	QCD
6	6	Chiu Hin Chun	Hong Kong	7:13.70	QCD

==== Quarterfinal 2 ====
Rank	Lane	Rower	Nation	Time	Notes
1	3	Oliver Zeidler	Germany	6:45.32	QAB
2	5	Tim Brys	Belgium	6:46.26	QAB
3	4	Mihai Chiruta	Romania	6:46.32	QAB
4	2	James Plihal	United States	6:47.03	QCD
5	1	Sid Ali Boudina	Algeria	7:06.31	QCD
6	6	Javier Insfran	Paraguay	7:31.50	QCD

==== Quarterfinal 3 ====
Rank	Lane	Rower	Nation	Time	Notes
1	3	Simon van Dorp	Netherlands	6:49.96	QAB
2	4	Damir Martin	Croatia	6:53.55	QAB
3	2	Stefanos Ntouskos	Greece	6:56.68	QAB
4	5	Bendeguz Petervari-Molnar	Hungary	7:05.04	QCD
5	6	Isak Žvegelj	Slovenia	7:06.42	QCD
6	1	Reidy Cardona Blanco	Cuba	7:10.40	QCD

==== Quarterfinal 4 ====
Rank	Lane	Rower	Nation	Time	Notes
1	3	Yauheni Zalaty	Individual Neutral Athletes	6:49.27	QAB
2	5	Giedrius Bieliauskias	Lithuania	6:51.80	QAB
3	4	Ryuta Arakawa	Japan	6:54.17	QAB
4	2	Kristian Vasiliev	Bulgaria	6:58.67	QCD
5	6	Balraj Panwar	India	7:05.10	QCD
6	1	Abdelkhalek El-Banna	Egypt	7:18.59	QCD

=== Semifinals ===
The first three of each heat qualify to the better final (E, C, A) while the remainder go to the lower final (F, D, B).

==== Semifinal A/B 1 ====
Rank	Lane	Rower	Nation	Time	Notes
1	4	Simon van Dorp	Netherlands	6:42.39	FA
2	3	Tom Mackintosh	New Zealand	6:44.49	FA
3	2	Tim Brys	Belgium	6:45.32	FA
4	6	Ryuta Arakawa	Japan	6:51.13	FB
5	1	Bruno Cetraro	Uruguay	7:08.29	FB
6	5	Giedrius Bieliauskias	Lithuania	7:09.29	FB

==== Semifinal A/B 2 ====
Rank	Lane	Rower	Nation	Time	Notes
1	4	Oliver Zeidler	Germany	6:35.77	FA, OB
2	3	Yauheni Zalaty	Individual Neutral Athletes	6:39.01	FA
3	1	Stefanos Ntouskos	Greece	6:40.78	FA
4	5	Sverri Nielsen	Denmark	6:43.95	FB
5	6	Mihai Chiruta	Romania	6:52.95	FB
6	2	Damir Martin	Croatia	6:58.23	FB

==== Semifinal C/D 1 ====
Rank	Lane	Rower	Nation	Time	Notes
1	4	Lucas Verthein	Brazil	6:55.07	FC
2	3	Bendegúz Pétervári-Molnár	Hungary	6:56.92	FC
3	5	Sid Ali Boudina	Algeria	6:57.06	FC
4	6	Abdelkhalek Elbanna	Egypt	7:02.76	FD
5	1	Chiu Hin Chun	Hong Kong	7:03.68	FD
6	2	Balraj Panwar	India	7:04.97	FD

==== Semifinal C/D 2 ====
Rank	Lane	Rower	Nation	Time	Notes
1	3	James Plihal	United States	6:56.95	FC
2	4	Kristian Vasiliev	Bulgaria	6:57.75	FC
3	6	Javier Insfran	Paraguay	7:00.93	FC
4	5	Isak Žvegelj	Slovenia	7:09.41	FD
5	2	Quentin Antognelli	Monaco	7:14.32	FD
6	1	Reidy Cardona Blanco	Cuba	7:15.63	FD

==== Semifinal E/F 1 ====
Rank	Lane	Rower	Nation	Time	Notes
1	4	Vladislav Yakovlev	Kazakhstan	7:26.20	FE
2	2	Mohamed Taieb	Tunisia	7:29.64	FE
3	3	La Memo	Indonesia	7:32.18	FE
4	1	André Matias	Angola	8:01.63	FF

==== Semifinal E/F 2 ====
Rank	Lane	Rower	Nation	Time	Notes
1	3	Dara Alizadeh	Bermuda	7:33.38	FE
2	4	Stephen Cox	Zimbabwe	7:36.59	FE
3	2	Premanut Wattananusith	Thailand	7:48.78	FE
4	5	Mohamed Bukrah	Libya	8:00.42	FF
5	1	Abdalla Ahmed	Sudan	8:10.68	FF

=== Finals ===
==== Final F ====
Rank	Lane	Rower	Nation	Time	Notes
31	2	Mohamed Bukrah	Libya	7:28.90	
32	1	André Matias	Angola	7:30.43	
33	3	Abdalla Ahmed	Sudan	7:38.51	

==== Final E ====
Rank	Lane	Rower	Nation	Time	Notes
25	4	Vladislav Yakovlev	Kazakhstan	6:59.43	
26	2	Mohamed Taieb	Tunisia	7:00.31	
27	1	La Memo	Indonesia	7:02.23	
28	3	Dara Alizadeh	Bermuda	7:03.12	
29	5	Stephen Cox	Zimbabwe	7:09.34	
30	6	Premanut Wattananusith	Thailand	7:18.58	

==== Final D ====
Rank	Lane	Rower	Nation	Time	Notes
19	5	Quentin Antognelli	Monaco	6:54.93	
20	2	Chiu Hin Chun	Hong Kong	6:56.65	
21	4	Abdelkhalek Elbanna	Egypt	6:58.44	
22	3	Isak Žvegelj	Slovenia	6:59.46	
23	1	Balraj Panwar	India	7:02.37	
24	6	Reidy Cardona Blanco	Cuba	7:03.23	

==== Final C ====
Rank	Lane	Rower	Nation	Time	Notes
13	4	James Plihal	United States	6:41.97	
14	5	Kristian Vasiliev	Bulgaria	6:44.61	
15	3	Lucas Verthein	Brazil	6:47.37	
16	2	Bendegúz Pétervári-Molnár	Hungary	6:47.81	
17	6	Javier Insfran	Paraguay	6:50.48	
18	1	Sid Ali Boudina	Algeria	6:51.99	

==== Final B ====
Rank	Lane	Rower	Nation	Time	Notes
7	2	Mihai Chiruta	Romania	6:44.83	
8	4	Sverri Nielsen	Denmark	6:44.83	
9	3	Ryuta Arakawa	Japan	6:47.02	
10	6	Giedrius Bieliauskias	Lithuania	6:56.39	
11	1	Damir Martin	Croatia	6:57.77	
12	5	Bruno Cetraro	Uruguay	7:22.71	

==== Final A ====
Rank	Lane	Rower	Nation	Time	Notes
1st place, gold medalist(s)	3	Oliver Zeidler	Germany	6:37.57	
2nd place, silver medalist(s)	2	Yauheni Zalaty	Individual Neutral Athletes	6:42.96	
3rd place, bronze medalist(s)	4	Simon van Dorp	Netherlands	6:44.72	
4	6	Tim Brys	Belgium	6:48.44	
5	5	Tom Mackintosh	New Zealand	6:49.62	
6	1	Stefanos Ntouskos	Greece	7:02.05	
