= 2018 World Rowing Championships – Women's lightweight quadruple sculls =

Women's lightweight quadruple sculls at the 2018 World Rowing Championships
- Venue: Plovdiv Regatta Venue
- Location: Plovdiv, Bulgaria
- Dates: 10–14 September
- Competitors: 28 from 7 nations
- Winning time: 6:28.32

Medalists
gold medal	Wu Qiang; Liang Guoru; Chen Fang; Pan Dandan	China
silver medal	Trine Toft Andersen; Aja Runge Holmegaard; Juliane Rasmussen; Mathilde Persson	Denmark
bronze medal	Fini Sturm; Caroline Meyer; Ladina Meier; Anja Noske	Germany

The women's lightweight quadruple sculls competition at the 2018 World Rowing Championships in Plovdiv took place at the Plovdiv Regatta Venue.

== Schedule ==
The schedule was as follows:

Date	Time	Round
Monday 10 September 2018	10:02	Heats
Wednesday 12 September 2018	11:49	Repechage
Friday 14 September 2018	12:44	Final

All times are Eastern European Summer Time (UTC+3)

== Results ==
=== Heats ===
Heat winners advanced directly to the final. The remaining boats were sent to the repechage.

==== Heat 1 ====
Rank	Rowers	Country	Time	Notes
1	Giulia Mignemi; Paola Piazzolla; Allegra Francalacci; Arianna Noseda	Italy	6:27.84	F
2	Trine Toft Andersen; Aja Runge Holmegaard; Juliane Rasmussen; Mathilde Persson	Denmark	6:29.80	R
3	Caroline Meyer; Ladina Meier; Fini Sturm; Anja Noske	Germany	6:31.21	R
4	Svitlana Martynova; Yuliia Kovalenko; Hanna Dymova; Larysa Zhalinska	Ukraine	7:05.25	R

==== Heat 2 ====
Rank	Rowers	Country	Time	Notes
1	Wu Qiang; Liang Guoru; Chen Fang; Pan Dandan	China	6:23.17	F
2	Hillary Saeger; Margaret Bertasi; Christine Cavallo; Michaela Copenhaver	United States	6:26.61	R
3	Gemma Hall; Francesca Rawlins; Elisha Lewis; Madeleine Arlett	Great Britain	6:27.25	R

=== Repechage ===
The four fastest boats advanced to the final. The remaining boat took no further part in the competition.

Rank	Rowers	Country	Time	Notes
1	Trine Toft Andersen; Aja Runge Holmegaard; Juliane Rasmussen; Mathilde Persson	Denmark	6:31.09	F
2	Hillary Saeger; Margaret Bertasi; Christine Cavallo; Michaela Copenhaver	United States	6:33.40	F
3	Gemma Hall; Francesca Rawlins; Elisha Lewis; Madeleine Arlett	Great Britain	6:34.48	F
4	Fini Sturm; Caroline Meyer; Ladina Meier; Anja Noske	Germany	6:35.50	F
5	Svitlana Martynova; Yuliia Kovalenko; Hanna Dymova; Larysa Zhalinska	Ukraine	7:02.40	

=== Final ===
The final determined the rankings.

Rank	Rowers	Country	Time
1st place, gold medalist(s)	Wu Qiang; Liang Guoru; Chen Fang; Pan Dandan	China	6:28.32
2nd place, silver medalist(s)	Trine Toft Andersen; Aja Runge Holmegaard; Juliane Rasmussen; Mathilde Persson	Denmark	6:33.33
3rd place, bronze medalist(s)	Fini Sturm; Caroline Meyer; Ladina Meier; Anja Noske	Germany	6:34.25
4	Hillary Saeger; Margaret Bertasi; Christine Cavallo; Michaela Copenhaver	United States	6:36.02
5	Gemma Hall; Francesca Rawlins; Elisha Lewis; Madeleine Arlett	Great Britain	6:37.51
6	Giulia Mignemi; Paola Piazzolla; Allegra Francalacci; Arianna Noseda	Italy	6:39.04
