= 2026 World Rowing Championships – Men's single sculls =

Men's single sculls at the 2026 World Rowing Championships
- Venue: Bosbaan
- Location: Amsterdam, Netherlands
- Dates: 26–30 August
- Competitors: 37 from 37 nations
- Winning time: 6:35.22

Medalists
| gold medal | Oliver Zeidler | Germany |
| silver medal | Yauheni Zalaty |
| bronze medal | Jonas Juel | Norway |

The men's single sculls competition at the 2026 World Rowing Championships will take place at Bosbaan, in Amsterdam.

== Schedule ==
The schedule was as follows:

| Date | Time | Round |
|---|---|---|
| Wednesday 26 August 2026 | 13:42 | Heats |
| Friday, 28 August 2026 | 13:27 | Quarterfinals |
| Friday, 28 August 2026 | 14:26 | Final E |
| Friday, 28 August 2026 | 14:31 | Final F |
| Saturday, 29 August 2026 | 10:10 | Final D |
| Saturday, 29 August 2026 | 10:20 | Final C |
| Saturday, 29 August 2026 | 15:19 | Semifinals |
| Sunday, 30 August 2026 | 13:20 | Final B |
| Sunday, 30 August 2026 | 14:28 | Final A |

All times are Central European Summer Time (UTC+2)

== Results ==
=== Heats ===
The two fastest boats in each heat and the fourteen fastest times advanced directly to the quarterfinals. The remaining boats were sent to the Final E, Final F nd remaining crew eliminated.

==== Heat 1 ====
| Rank | Rower | Country | Time | Notes |
|---|---|---|---|---|
| 1 | Yauheni Zalaty | Individual Neutral Athletes 2 | 7:20.16 | QF |
| 2 | Bruno Cetraro | Uruguay | 7:22.07 | QF |
| 3 | Diogo Gonçalves | Portugal | 7:23.16 | QF |
| 4 | Bastian Secher | Denmark | 7:25.29 | QF |
| 5 | Christopher Baxter | South Africa | 7:36.85 | FE |
| 6 | Marouane Boufrir | Morocco | 8:29.04 | FF |

==== Heat 2 ====
| Rank | Rower | Country | Time | Notes |
|---|---|---|---|---|
| 1 | Jonas Juel | Norway | 7:15.68 | QF |
| 2 | Mihai Chiruţă | Romania | 7:23.59 | QF |
| 3 | Tatsuya Sakurama | Japan | 7:26.91 | QF |
| 4 | Pavel Sorin | Uzbekistan | 7:28.99 | QF |
| 5 | Kevin Harvell | Puerto Rico | 7:57.48 | FF |
| 6 | Abdirahman Hassan | Somalia | 9:13.96 | |

==== Heat 3 ====
| Rank | Rower | Country | Time | Notes |
|---|---|---|---|---|
| 1 | Samuel Melvin | United States | 7:16.47 | QF |
| 2 | Fintan McCarthy | Ireland | 7:20.69 | QF |
| 3 | Trevor Jones | Canada | 7:27.87 | QF |
| 4 | Bakr Al-Dulaimi | Iraq | 7:31.35 | QF |
| 5 | Abdalla Ahmed | Sudan | 8:11.98 | FF |

==== Heat 4 ====
| Rank | Rower | Country | Time | Notes |
|---|---|---|---|---|
| 1 | Oliver Zeidler | Germany | 7:24.15 | QF |
| 2 | Samuel Oskarsson | Sweden | 7:32.33 | QF |
| 3 | Cevdet Ege Mutlu | Turkey | 7:33.70 | FE |
| 4 | Zhang Xiuli | China | 7:39.48 | FE |
| 5 | Arvind Singh | India | 7:47.61 | FE |

==== Heat 5 ====
| Rank | Rower | Country | Time | Notes |
|---|---|---|---|---|
| 1 | Stefanos Ntouskos | Greece | 7:28.84 | QF |
| 2 | Bendegúz Pétervári-Molnár | Hungary | 7:30.78 | QF |
| 3 | Dovydas Nemeravičius | Lithuania | 7:32.51 | FE |
| 4 | Gabriel Soares | Italy | 7:32.99 | FE |
| 5 | Dominique Williams | Trinidad and Tobago | 7:54.38 | FF |

==== Heat 6 ====
| Rank | Rower | Country | Time | Notes |
|---|---|---|---|---|
| 1 | Kai Schätzle | Switzerland | 7:15.45 | QF |
| 2 | Aleksandr Kovalskii | Individual Neutral Athletes 1 | 7:18.64 | QF |
| 3 | Tristan Vandenbussche | Belgium | 7:23.71 | QF |
| 4 | Kasper Hirvilampi | Finland | 7:55.86 | FF |
| 5 | Abdulrahman Al-Fadhel | Kuwait | 8:18.41 | FF |

==== Heat 7 ====
| Rank | Rower | Country | Time | Notes |
|---|---|---|---|---|
| 1 | Aleix García | Spain | 7:09.91 | QF |
| 2 | Victor Marcelot | France | 7:11.60 | QF |
| 3 | Filip-Matej Pfeifer | Slovenia | 7:19.17 | QF |
| 4 | Lucas Verthein | Brazil | 7:20.63 | QF |
| 5 | Fran Suk | Croatia | 7:21.02 | QF |

=== Quarterfinals ===
The three fastest boats in each heat advance to the semifinals. The remaining boats were sent to the Final C and Final D.

==== Quarterfinal 1 ====
| Rank | Rower | Country | Time | Notes |
|---|---|---|---|---|
| 1 | Yauheni Zalaty | Individual Neutral Athletes 2 | 6:50.43 | SF |
| 2 | Aleksandr Kovalskii | Individual Neutral Athletes 1 | 6:53.42 | SF |
| 3 | Bastian Secher | Denmark | 6:55.53 | SF |
| 4 | Lucas Verthein | Brazil | 6:59.78 | FC |
| 5 | Aleix García | Spain | 7:02.79 | FD |
| 6 | Bakr Al-Dulaimi | Iraq | 7:09.95 | FD |

==== Quarterfinal 2 ====
| Rank | Rower | Country | Time | Notes |
|---|---|---|---|---|
| 1 | Oliver Zeidler | Germany | 6:46.48 | SF |
| 2 | Kai Schätzle | Switzerland | 6:48.20 | SF |
| 3 | Fintan McCarthy | Ireland | 6:51.28 | SF |
| 4 | Filip-Matej Pfeifer | Slovenia | 6:56.96 | FC |
| 5 | Tristan Vandenbussche | Belgium | 6:59.40 | FC |
| 6 | Pavel Sorin | Uzbekistan | 7:12.60 | FD |

==== Quarterfinal 3 ====
| Rank | Rower | Country | Time | Notes |
|---|---|---|---|---|
| 1 | Jonas Juel | Norway | 6:44.97 | SF |
| 2 | Bruno Cetraro | Uruguay | 6:47.71 | SF |
| 3 | Stefanos Ntouskos | Greece | 6:50.26 | SF |
| 4 | Samuel Oskarsson | Sweden | 6:54.31 | FC |
| 5 | Diogo Gonçalves | Portugal | 6:59.01 | FC |
| 6 | Trevor Jones | Canada | 7:01.83 | FD |

==== Quarterfinal 4 ====
| Rank | Rower | Country | Time | Notes |
|---|---|---|---|---|
| 1 | Samuel Melvin | United States | 6:42.36 | SF |
| 2 | Victor Marcelot | France | 6:46.08 | SF |
| 3 | Mihai Chiruţă | Romania | 6:50.44 | SF |
| 4 | Bendegúz Pétervári-Molnár | Hungary | 6:51.94 | FC |
| 5 | Tatsuya Sakurama | Japan | 6:59.83 | FD |
| 6 | Fran Suk | Croatia | 7:01.87 | FD |

=== Semifinals ===
The three fastest boats in each heat advance to the Final A. The remaining boats were sent to the Final B

==== Semifinal 1 ====
| Rank | Rower | Country | Time | Notes |
|---|---|---|---|---|
| 1 | Oliver Zeidler | Germany | 6:45.89 | FA |
| 2 | Samuel Melvin | United States | 6:47.78 | FA |
| 3 | Bruno Cetraro | Uruguay | 6:50.64 | FA |
| 4 | Fintan McCarthy | Ireland | 6:55.45 | FB |
| 5 | Mihai Chiruţă | Romania | 6:59.86 | FB |
| 6 | Aleksandr Kovalskii | Individual Neutral Athletes 1 | 7:11.64 | FB |

==== Semifinal 2 ====
| Rank | Rower | Country | Time | Notes |
|---|---|---|---|---|
| 1 | Yauheni Zalaty | Individual Neutral Athletes 2 | 6:45.73 | FA |
| 2 | Jonas Juel | Norway | 6:47.70 | FA |
| 3 | Victor Marcelot | France | 6:50.54 | FA |
| 4 | Stefanos Ntouskos | Greece | 6:57.81 | FB |
| 5 | Kai Schätzle | Switzerland | 6:59.81 | FB |
| 6 | Bastian Secher | Denmark | 7:09.46 | FB |

=== Finals ===
The A final determined the rankings for places 1 to 6. Additional rankings were determined in the other finals.

==== Final F ====
| Rank | Rower | Country | Time | Total rank |
|---|---|---|---|---|
| 1 | Dominique Williams | Trinidad and Tobago | 7:08.43 | 31 |
| 2 | Kevin Harvell | Puerto Rico | 7:11.20 | 32 |
| 3 | Kasper Hirvilampi | Finland | 7:23.15 | 33 |
| 4 | Abdalla Ahmed | Sudan | 7:39.09 | 34 |
| 5 | Marouane Boufrir | Morocco | 7:44.61 | 35 |
| 6 | Abdulrahman Al-Fadhel | Kuwait | 7:46.73 | 36 |

==== Final E ====
| Rank | Rower | Country | Time | Total rank |
|---|---|---|---|---|
| 1 | Dovydas Nemeravičius | Lithuania | 6:50.15 | 25 |
| 2 | Gabriel Soares | Italy | 6:53.39 | 26 |
| 3 | Cevdet Ege Mutlu | Turkey | 6:53.96 | 27 |
| 4 | Christopher Baxter | South Africa | 7:01.90 | 28 |
| 5 | Zhang Xiuli | China | 7:05.37 | 29 |
| 6 | Arvind Singh | India | 7:11.03 | 30 |

==== Final D ====
| Rank | Rower | Country | Time | Total rank |
|---|---|---|---|---|
| 1 | Trevor Jones | Canada | 6:51.96 | 19 |
| 2 | Tatsuya Sakurama | Japan | 6:57.92 | 20 |
| 3 | Aleix García | Spain | 7:02.76 | 21 |
| 4 | Fran Suk | Croatia | 7:04.78 | 22 |
| 5 | Bakr Al-Dulaimi | Iraq | 7:05.78 | 23 |
| 6 | Pavel Sorin | Uzbekistan | 7:07.89 | 24 |

==== Final C ====
| Rank | Rower | Country | Time | Total rank |
|---|---|---|---|---|
| 1 | Samuel Oskarsson | Sweden | 6:54.75 | 13 |
| 2 | Filip-Matej Pfeifer | Slovenia | 6:56.12 | 14 |
| 3 | Bendegúz Pétervári-Molnár | Hungary | 6:56.23 | 15 |
| 4 | Diogo Gonçalves | Portugal | 7:03.33 | 16 |
| 5 | Tristan Vandenbussche | Belgium | 7:07.75 | 17 |
| 6 | Lucas Verthein | Brazil | 7:19.17 | 18 |

==== Final B ====
| Rank | Rower | Country | Time | Total rank |
|---|---|---|---|---|
| 1 | Kai Schätzle | Switzerland | 6:42.25 | 7 |
| 2 | Mihai Chiruţă | Romania | 6:43.19 | 8 |
| 3 | Bastian Secher | Denmark | 6:45.00 | 9 |
| 4 | Stefanos Ntouskos | Greece | 6:45.45 | 10 |
| 5 | Fintan McCarthy | Ireland | 6:46.07 | 11 |
| 6 | Aleksandr Kovalskii | Individual Neutral Athletes 1 | 6:50.05 | 12 |

==== Final A ====
| Rank | Rower | Country | Time |
|---|---|---|---|
| 1st place, gold medalist(s) | Oliver Zeidler | Germany | 6:35.22 |
| 2nd place, silver medalist(s) | Yauheni Zalaty | Individual Neutral Athletes 1 | 6:38.33 |
| 3rd place, bronze medalist(s) | Jonas Juel | Norway | 6:44.03 |
| 4 | Samuel Melvin | United States | 6:44.14 |
| 5 | Victor Marcelot | France | 6:45.64 |
| 6 | Bruno Cetraro | Uruguay | 6:52.48 |
