= Alfonso Scalzone =

Italian rower (born 1996)

Personal information
- Nationality: Italian
- Born: 11 June 1996 (age 30)

Sport
- Country: Italy
- Sport: Rowing
- Event(s): Lightweight coxless pair, Lightweight quadruple sculls
Medal record
World Championships
Gold medal – first place	2018 Plovdiv	Lwt coxless pair
Silver medal – second place	2017 Sarasota	Lwt coxless pair
Silver medal – second place	2019 Ottensheim	Lwt quad sculls
European Championships
Bronze medal – third place	2025 Plovdiv	Coxless eight

Alfonso Scalzone (born 11 June 1996) is an Italian rower.

== Career ==
He is the nephew of Angelo Scalzone, Olympic champion in shooting, mixed trap at the 1972 Summer Olympics.

He competes for the Canottieri Savoia of Naples.

He started competition with Giuseppe Di Mare with he won the gold medal at the World Championships in Plovdiv.

At the 2018 World Rowing Championships, in Plovdiv, still with Giuseppe Di Mare, he won the gold medal.

At the 2019 European Rowing Championships in Lucerne, he won the silves medal with teammates Catello Amarante II, Lorenzo Fontana and Gabriel Soares.
