= 2018 World Rowing Championships – Men's lightweight coxless pair =

Men's lightweight coxless pair at the 2018 World Rowing Championships
- Venue: Plovdiv Regatta Venue
- Location: Plovdiv, Bulgaria
- Dates: 14 September
- Competitors: 6 from 3 nations
- Winning time: 6:38.55

Medalists
gold medal	Giuseppe Di Mare; Alfonso Scalzone	Italy
silver medal	Antonios Papakonstantinou; Ioannis Marokos	Greece
bronze medal	David Smith; Thomas Foster	United States

The men's lightweight coxless pair competition at the 2018 World Rowing Championships in Plovdiv took place at the Plovdiv Regatta Venue.

== Schedule ==
The schedule was as follows:

Date	Time	Round
Friday 14 September 2018	11:59	Final

All times are Eastern European Summer Time (UTC+3)

== Results ==
With fewer than seven entries in this event, a direct final was held to determine the rankings.

Rank	Rowers	Country	Time
1st place, gold medalist(s)	Giuseppe Di Mare; Alfonso Scalzone	Italy	6:38.55
2nd place, silver medalist(s)	Antonios Papakonstantinou; Ioannis Marokos	Greece	6:41.48
3rd place, bronze medalist(s)	David Smith; Thomas Foster	United States	6:56.99
