= 2022 World Rowing Championships – Women's lightweight quadruple sculls =

Women's lightweight quadruple sculls at the 2022 World Rowing Championships
- Venue: Labe aréna
- Location: Račice, Czech Republic
- Dates: 19 September – 23 September
- Competitors: 8 from 2 nations
- Winning time: 6:38.14

Medalists
gold medal	Ilaria Corazza; Giulia Mignemi; Silvia Crosio; Arianna Noseda	Italy

The women's lightweight quadruple sculls competition at the 2022 World Rowing Championships took place at the Račice regatta venue.

== Schedule ==
The schedule was as follows:

Date	Time	Round
Monday 19 September 2022	11:14	Heats
Friday 23 September 2022	15:50	Final A

All times are Central European Summer Time (UTC+2)

== Results ==
All boats advanced directly to Final A.

=== Heat ===
Rank	Rower	Country	Time	Notes
1	Ilaria Corazza; Giulia Mignemi; Silvia Crosio; Arianna Noseda	Italy	6:47.54	FA
2	Grace D'Souza; Sarah Maietta; Cara Stawicki; Elizabeth Martin	United States	7:05.20	FA

=== Final A ===
The final determined the rankings.

Rank	Rower	Country	Time	Notes
1st place, gold medalist(s)	Ilaria Corazza; Giulia Mignemi; Silvia Crosio; Arianna Noseda	Italy	6:38.14	
2	Grace D'Souza; Sarah Maietta; Cara Stawicki; Elizabeth Martin	United States	7:00.17	
