= Giedrius Bieliauskas =

Lithuanian rower (born 1997)

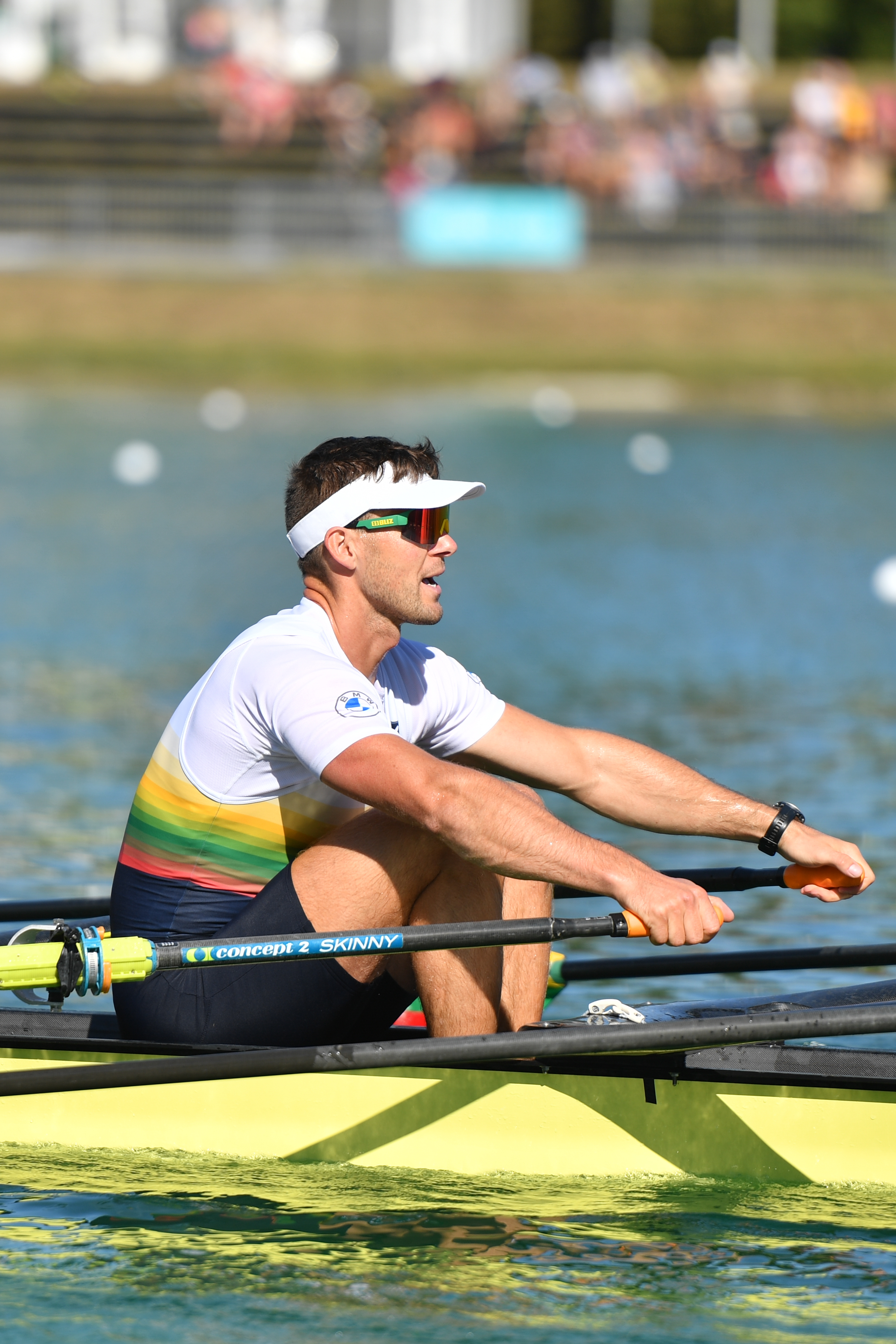
- 2022 European Championships

Personal information
- Nationality: Lithuanian
- Born: 27 July 1997 (age 28)

Sport
- Sport: Rowing
- Event: Single sculls
Medal record
Men's rowing
Representing Lithuania
European Championships
Bronze medal – third place	2024 Szeged	Single sculls

Giedrius Bieliauskas (born 27 July 1997) is a Lithuanian rower. He won a bronze medal at the 2024 European Rowing Championships and placed tenth overall competing at the 2024 Paris Olympics in the single sculls.

== Career ==
In 2018, he won silver in the single sculls at the 2018 European Rowing U23 Championships held at the Brest Rowing Course in Brest, Belarus.

He travelled as a non-competing reserve for the Lithuania national rowing team to the delayed 2020 Olympic Games, held in Tokyo, Japan, in 2021.

He won a bronze medal in the single sculls at the 2024 European Rowing Championships in Szeged, Hungary finishing behind the European champion Oliver Zeidler of Germany, while silver was won by Olympic champion Stefanos Ntouskos of Greece, with Bieliauskas sealing bronze on the finish line after a close battle with rower from Denmark, Sverri Sandberg Nielsen, to win the bronze medal in a time of 7:43.35.

He qualified for the Olympic Games through his performance at the Rowing World Cup in Lucerne, Switzerland, in May 2024. He competed in the single sculls at the 2024 Olympic Games in Paris, France. Competing at the Games, he qualified for the quarter-finals, placing third in his heat moving ahead of Slovenian Ivan Zvegelja in the final metres of the finish, with only 0.27 seconds separating them at the finish. He finished second in his quarter final behind Individual Neutral Athlete Yauheni Zalaty. He finished in sixth place in his semi-final and did not progress to the A Olympic final. He finished in fourth place in the B final to finish the Olympic Games in tenth place overall.
