= 2019 World Rowing Championships – Women's lightweight coxless pair =

Women's lightweight coxless pair at the 2019 World Rowing Championships
- Venue: Linz-Ottensheim
- Location: Ottensheim, Austria
- Dates: 27–30 August
- Competitors: 8 from 4 nations
- Winning time: 7:32.64

Medalists
gold medal	Margaret Bertasi; Cara Stawicki	United States
silver medal	Sofia Tanghetti; Maria Ludovica Costa	Italy
bronze medal	Janika Kölblin; Marie-Christine Gerhardt	Germany

The women's lightweight coxless pair competition at the 2019 World Rowing Championships took place at the Linz-Ottensheim regatta venue.

== Schedule ==
The schedule was as follows:

Date	Time	Round
Tuesday 27 August 2019	11:34	Test race
Friday 30 August 2019	14:47	Final

All times are Central European Summer Time (UTC+2)

== Results ==
=== Test race ===
With fewer than seven entries in this event, boats contested a race for lanes before the final.

Rank	Rowers	Country	Time
1	Margaret Bertasi; Cara Stawicki	United States	7:35.46
2	Sofia Tanghetti; Maria Ludovica Costa	Italy	7:36.39
3	Janika Kölblin; Marie-Christine Gerhardt	Germany	7:49.52
4	Tatjana Grigorjeva; Ludmila Ivanova	Latvia	8:05.02

=== Final ===
The final determined the rankings.

Rank	Rowers	Country	Time
1st place, gold medalist(s)	Margaret Bertasi; Cara Stawicki	United States	7:32.64
2nd place, silver medalist(s)	Sofia Tanghetti; Maria Ludovica Costa	Italy	7:34.20
3rd place, bronze medalist(s)	Janika Kölblin; Marie-Christine Gerhardt	Germany	7:37.72
4	Tatjana Grigorjeva; Ludmila Ivanova	Latvia	8:03.78
