= Maria Ludovica Costa =

Italian rower

Personal information
- Nationality: Italian
- Born: 24 December 2000 (age 25)

Sport
- Country: Italy
- Sport: Rowing
- Event: Lightweight coxless pair
- Club: Rowing Clug Genovese
Medal record
World Championships
Silver medal – second place	2019 Ottensheim	Lwt coxless pair

Maria Ludovica Costa (born 24 December 2000) is an Italian rower for Rowing Club Genovese.

She won a silver medal at the 2019 World Rowing Championships.

In the same year she is U23 World Rowing Champion in Sarasota in the same boat, lightweight coxless pair, with her boat mate Sofia Tanghetti.
