= 2019 World Rowing Championships – Men's lightweight quadruple sculls =

Men's lightweight quadruple sculls at the 2019 World Rowing Championships
- Venue: Linz-Ottensheim
- Location: Ottensheim, Austria
- Dates: 26–30 August
- Competitors: 32 from 8 nations
- Winning time: 5:53.63

Medalists
gold medal	Zhang Zhiyuan; Chen Sensen; Lü Fanpu; Zeng Tao	China
silver medal	Lorenzo Fontana; Alfonso Scalzone; Catello Amarante; Gabriel Soares	Italy
bronze medal	Damion Eigenberg; David Kampman; Ward van Zeijl; Bart Lukkes	Netherlands

The men's lightweight quadruple sculls competition at the 2019 World Rowing Championships took place at the Linz-Ottensheim regatta venue.

== Schedule ==
The schedule was as follows:

Date	Time	Round
Monday 26 August 2019	11:47	Heats
Tuesday 27 August 2019	11:41	Repechage
Friday 30 August 2019	10:32	Final B
Friday 30 August 2019	15:36	Final A

All times are Central European Summer Time (UTC+2)

== Results ==
=== Heats ===
Heat winners advanced directly to the final. The remaining boats were sent to the repechage.

==== Heat 1 ====
Rank	Rowers	Country	Time	Notes
1	Lorenzo Fontana; Alfonso Scalzone; Catello Amarante; Gabriel Soares	Italy	5:56.64	FA
2	Frederik Taulbjerg; Jonas Lund; Fredrik Leicht; Christian Hagemann	Denmark	5:59.15	R
3	Paul Sieber; Sebastian Kabas; Bernhard Sieber; Philipp Kellner	Austria	6:01.54	R
4	Hugh Sutton; Miles Taylor; Ryan Ballantine; Jacob McCarthy	Ireland	6:04.84	R

==== Heat 2 ====
Rank	Rowers	Country	Time	Notes
1	Zhang Zhiyuan; Chen Sensen; Lü Fanpu; Zeng Tao	China	5:56.89	FA
2	Damion Eigenberg; David Kampman; Ward van Zeijl; Bart Lukkes	Netherlands	6:02.20	R
3	Leo Grandsire; Benjamin David; Thibault Colard; Thomas Baroukh	France	6:13.09	R
4	Zachary Heese; Peter Schmidt; Daniel Madden; Jasper Liu	United States	6:20.63	R

=== Repechage ===
The four fastest boats advanced to the A final. The remaining boats were sent to the B final.

Rank	Rowers	Country	Time	Notes
1	Damion Eigenberg; David Kampman; Ward van Zeijl; Bart Lukkes	Netherlands	5:55.10	FA
2	Frederik Taulbjerg; Jonas Lund; Fredrik Leicht; Christian Hagemann	Denmark	5:55.66	FA
3	Sebastian Kabas; Bernhard Sieber; Philipp Kellner; Paul Sieber	Austria	5:55.96	FA
4	Leo Grandsire; Benjamin David; Thibault Colard; Thomas Baroukh	France	5:57.47	FA
5	Hugh Sutton; Miles Taylor; Ryan Ballantine; Jacob McCarthy	Ireland	5:58.99	FB
6	Zachary Heese; Peter Schmidt; Daniel Madden; Jasper Liu	United States	5:59.25	FB

=== Finals ===
The A final determined the rankings for places 1 to 6. Additional rankings were determined in the B final.

==== Final B ====
Rank	Rowers	Country	Time
1	Zachary Heese; Peter Schmidt; Daniel Madden; Jasper Liu	United States	6:03.94
2	Hugh Sutton; Miles Taylor; Ryan Ballantine; Jacob McCarthy	Ireland	6:06.62

==== Final A ====
Rank	Rowers	Country	Time
1st place, gold medalist(s)	Zhang Zhiyuan; Chen Sensen; Lü Fanpu; Zeng Tao	China	5:53.63
2nd place, silver medalist(s)	Lorenzo Fontana; Alfonso Scalzone; Catello Amarante; Gabriel Soares	Italy	5:55.01
3rd place, bronze medalist(s)	Damion Eigenberg; David Kampman; Ward van Zeijl; Bart Lukkes	Netherlands	5:56.06
4	Frederik Taulbjerg; Jonas Lund; Fredrik Leicht; Christian Hagemann	Denmark	5:58.68
5	Sebastian Kabas; Bernhard Sieber; Philipp Kellner; Paul Sieber	Austria	5:58.79
6	Leo Grandsire; Benjamin David; Thibault Colard; Thomas Baroukh	France	5:58.79
