= 2019 World Rowing Championships – Women's lightweight quadruple sculls =

Women's lightweight quadruple sculls at the 2019 World Rowing Championships
- Venue: Linz-Ottensheim
- Location: Ottensheim, Austria
- Dates: 27–30 August
- Competitors: 20 from 5 nations
- Winning time: 6:34.00

Medalists
gold medal	Giulia Mignemi; Greta Martinelli; Silvia Crosio; Arianna Noseda	Italy
silver medal	Cheng Mengyin; Wu Qiang; Chen Fang; Yuan Xiaoyu	China
bronze medal	Fini Sturm; Vera Spanke; Leonie Pieper; Leonie Pless	Germany

The women's lightweight quadruple sculls competition at the 2019 World Rowing Championships took place at the Linz-Ottensheim regatta venue.

== Schedule ==
The schedule was as follows:

Date	Time	Round
Tuesday 27 August 2019	11:48	Test race
Friday 30 August 2019	15:52	Final

All times are Central European Summer Time (UTC+2)

== Results ==
=== Test race ===
With fewer than seven entries in this event, boats contested a race for lanes before the final.

Rank	Rowers	Country	Time
1	Cheng Mengyin; Wu Qiang; Chen Fang; Yuan Xiaoyu	China	6:31.76
2	Giulia Mignemi; Greta Martinelli; Silvia Crosio; Arianna Noseda	Italy	6:33.00
3	Jessica Hyne-Dolan; Michaela Copenhaver; Rosa Kemp; Mary Reckford	United States	6:35.29
4	Fini Sturm; Vera Spanke; Leonie Pieper; Leonie Pless	Germany	6:37.69
5	Lường Thị Thảo; Tạ Thanh Huyền; Đinh Thị Hảo; Hồ Thị Lý	Vietnam	6:49.40

=== Final ===
The final determined the rankings.

Rank	Rowers	Country	Time
1st place, gold medalist(s)	Giulia Mignemi; Greta Martinelli; Silvia Crosio; Arianna Noseda	Italy	6:34.00
2nd place, silver medalist(s)	Cheng Mengyin; Wu Qiang; Chen Fang; Yuan Xiaoyu	China	6:36.31
3rd place, bronze medalist(s)	Fini Sturm; Vera Spanke; Leonie Pieper; Leonie Pless	Germany	6:37.72
4	Jessica Hyne-Dolan; Michaela Copenhaver; Rosa Kemp; Mary Reckford	United States	6:38.36
5	Lường Thị Thảo; Tạ Thanh Huyền; Đinh Thị Hảo; Hồ Thị Lý	Vietnam	6:55.71
