= Zhang Zhiyuan =

Zhang Zhiyuan may refer to:

- Zhang Zhiyuan (astronaut) (born 1986), Chinese astronaut
- Zhang Zhiyuan (rower) (born 1994), Chinese rower
