= Zeng Tao =

Chinese rower

Personal information
- Nationality: Chinese
- Born: 19 May 1993 (age 33)

Sport
- Country: Chinese
- Sport: Rowing
- Event: Lightweight quadruple sculls
Medal record
World Championships
Gold medal – first place	2019 Ottensheim	Lwt quad sculls

Zeng Tao (born 19 May 1993) is a Chinese rower.

He won a medal at the 2019 World Rowing Championships.
