= 2019 World Rowing Championships – Men's lightweight coxless pair =

Men's lightweight coxless pair at the 2019 World Rowing Championships
- Venue: Linz-Ottensheim
- Location: Ottensheim, August
- Dates: 26–30 August
- Competitors: 16 from 8 nations
- Winning time: 6:37.75

Medalists
gold medal	Giuseppe Di Mare; Raffaele Serio	Italy
silver medal	Nikita Bolozin; Maksim Telitsyn	Russia
bronze medal	Vangelys Pereira; Emanuel Borges	Brazil

The men's lightweight coxless pair competition at the 2019 World Rowing Championships took place at the Linz-Ottensheim regatta venue.

== Schedule ==
The schedule was as follows:

Date	Time	Round
Monday 26 August 2019	11:27	Heats
Wednesday 28 August 2019	15:58	Repechage
Friday 30 August 2019	10:10	Final B
Friday 30 August 2019	15:03	Final A

All times are Central European Summer Time (UTC+2)

== Results ==
=== Heats ===
Heat winners advanced directly to the A final. The remaining boats were sent to the repechage.

==== Heat 1 ====
Rank	Rowers	Country	Time	Notes
1	Giuseppe Di Mare; Raffaele Serio	Italy	6:41.54	FA
2	Vangelys Pereira; Emanuel Borges	Brazil	6:49.05	R
3	Bence Szabó; Kálmán Furkó	Hungary	7:09.85	R
4	Paylak Mirzoyan; Mher Janikyan	Armenia	7:40.99	R

==== Heat 2 ====
Rank	Rowers	Country	Time	Notes
1	Jiří Kopáč; Jan Hajek	Czech Republic	6:52.80	FA
2	Nikita Bolozin; Maksim Telitsyn	Russia	6:54.25	R
3	James Nelson; Alex Twist	United States	7:00.69	R
4	Markus Lemp; Anton Sigl	Austria	7:26.12	R

=== Repechage ===
The four fastest boats advanced to the A final. The remaining boats were sent to the B final.

Rank	Rowers	Country	Time	Notes
1	Vangelys Pereira; Emanuel Borges	Brazil	6:48.50	FA
2	Nikita Bolozin; Maksim Telitsyn	Russia	6:51.37	FA
3	Bence Szabó; Kálmán Furkó	Hungary	6:52.88	FA
4	Markus Lemp; Anton Sigl	Austria	6:56.90	FA
5	James Nelson; Alex Twist	United States	6:58.31	FB
6	Paylak Mirzoyan; Mher Janikyan	Armenia	7:37.29	FB

=== Finals ===
The A final determined the rankings for places 1 to 6. Additional rankings were determined in the B final.

==== Final B ====
Rank	Rowers	Country	Time
1	James Nelson; Alex Twist	United States	7:00.45
2	Paylak Mirzoyan; Mher Janikyan	Armenia	7:32.97

==== Final A ====
Rank	Rowers	Country	Time
1st place, gold medalist(s)	Giuseppe Di Mare; Raffaele Serio	Italy	6:37.75
2nd place, silver medalist(s)	Nikita Bolozin; Maksim Telitsyn	Russia	6:42.07
3rd place, bronze medalist(s)	Vangelys Pereira; Emanuel Borges	Brazil	6:45.28
4	Bence Szabó; Kálmán Furkó	Hungary	6:49.50
5	Jiří Kopáč; Jan Hajek	Czech Republic	6:55.34
6	Markus Lemp; Anton Sigl	Austria	7:03.70
