= Vera Spanke =

German rower

Personal information
- Nationality: German
- Born: 13 December 1996 (age 29) Grevenbroich, Germany

Sport
- Country: Germany
- Sport: Rowing
- Event: Lightweight quadruple sculls
- Club: Neusser Ruderverein e.V.
Medal record
World Championships
Bronze medal – third place	2019 Ottensheim	Lwt quadruple sculls

Vera Spanke (born 13 December 1996) is a German rower.

She won a medal at the 2019 World Rowing Championships.
