= Marie-Christine Gerhardt =

German rower

Personal information
- Nationality: German
- Born: 7 April 1997 (age 29)

Sport
- Country: Germany
- Sport: Rowing
- Event: Lightweight coxless pair
- Club: Ludwigshafener Ruderverein von 1878
Medal record
World Championships
Bronze medal – third place	2019 Ottensheim	Lwt coxless pair

Marie-Christine Gerhardt (born 7 April 1997) is a German rower.

She won a medal at the 2019 World Rowing Championships.
