= Janika Kölblin =

German rower (born 1996)

Personal information
- Nationality: German
- Born: 9 May 1996 (age 30)

Sport
- Country: Germany
- Sport: Rowing
- Event: Lightweight coxless pair
- Club: Stuttgart-Cannstatter Ruderclub von 1910 e.V.
Medal record
World Championships
Bronze medal – third place	2019 Ottensheim	Lwt coxless pair

Janika Kölblin (born 9 May 1996) is a German rower.

She won a medal at the 2019 World Rowing Championships.
