= Nikita Bolozin =

Russian rower

Personal information
- Nationality: Russian
- Born: 14 December 1994 (age 31)

Sport
- Country: Russia
- Sport: Rowing
- Event: Lightweight coxless pair
Medal record
World Championships
Silver medal – second place	2019 Ottensheim	Lwt coxless pair

Nikita Bolozin (born 14 December 1994) is a Russian rower.

He won a medal at the 2019 World Rowing Championships.
