= Ward van Zeijl =

Dutch rower (born 1992)

Personal information
- Nationality: Dutch
- Born: 27 January 1992 (age 34)

Sport
- Country: Netherlands
- Sport: Rowing
- Event: Lightweight quadruple sculls
Medal record
World Championships
Bronze medal – third place	2019 Ottensheim	Lwt quad sculls
European Championships
Silver medal – second place	2019 Lucerne	Lwt quad sculls
Bronze medal – third place	2021 Varese	Lwt quad sculls
Bronze medal – third place	2018 Glasgow	Lwt quad sculls

Ward van Zeijl (born 27 January 1992) is a Dutch rower.

He won a medal at the 2019 World Rowing Championships.
