= Cheng Mengyin =

Chinese rower

Personal information
- Nationality: Chinese
- Born: 20 May 1995 (age 31)
- Height: 1.72 m (5 ft 8 in)
- Weight: 57 kg (126 lb)

Sport
- Country: China
- Sport: Rowing
- Event: Lightweight quadruple sculls
Medal record
World Championships
Silver medal – second place	2019 Ottensheim	Lwt quadruple sculls

Cheng Mengyin (born 20 May 1995) is a Chinese rower.

She won a medal at the 2019 World Rowing Championships.
