= Emanuel Borges =

Brazilian rower (born 1987)

Personal information
- Full name: Emanuel Dantas Borges
- Nationality: Brazilian
- Born: 1 December 1987 (age 38)
- Height: 1.78 m (5 ft 10 in)
- Weight: 70 kg (154 lb)

Sport
- Country: Brazil
- Sport: Rowing
- Event: Lightweight coxless pair
Medal record
World Championships
| Bronze medal – third place | 2019 Ottensheim | Lwt coxless pair |

Emanuel Dantas Borges (born 1 December 1987) is a Brazilian rower.

He won a medal at the 2019 World Rowing Championships.
