= Raffaele Serio =

Italian rower (born 1999)

Personal information
- Nationality: Italian
- Born: 22 April 1999 (age 27)

Sport
- Country: Italy
- Sport: Rowing
- Event: Lightweight coxless pair
Medal record
World Championships
Gold medal – first place	2019 Ottensheim	Lwt coxless pair

Raffaele Serio (born 22 April 1999) is an Italian rower.

He won the gold medal with Giuseppe Di Mare, lightweight coxless pair, at the 2019 World Rowing Championships.
