= Hilmar Verbeek =

Dutch rower

Personal information
- Nationality: Dutch
- Born: 23 August 1999 (age 26) Maastricht, Netherlands
- Height: 1.85 m (6 ft 1 in)
- Weight: 70 kg (154 lb)

Sport
- Country: Netherlands
- Sport: Rowing
- Event: Lightweight quadruple sculls
- Club: A.R.S.R. "Skadi", LR&ZV "Die Leythe", Maastrichtsche Watersportclub
Medal record
European Championships
| Silver medal – second place | 2019 Lucerne | Lwt quad sculls |

Hilmar Verbeek (born 23 August 1999) is a Dutch rower. He was born in Maastricht, Netherlands, where he rowed as a junior rower and competed twice at the Coupe de la Jeunesse. Currently, Verbeek lives in Delft to study Life Sciences at Delft University of Technology and Leiden University. Verbeek now rows in Rotterdam at the A.R.S.R. "Skadi" club.

He won a silver medal at the 2019 European Rowing Championships.

== Results ==
=== European Championships ===
- 2019 – Silver, Lightweight quadruple sculls

=== World Cup ===
- 2019 – 5th place, Lightweight quadruple sculls (World Rowing Cup III, Rotterdam)
