= David Kampman =

Dutch rower (born 1997)

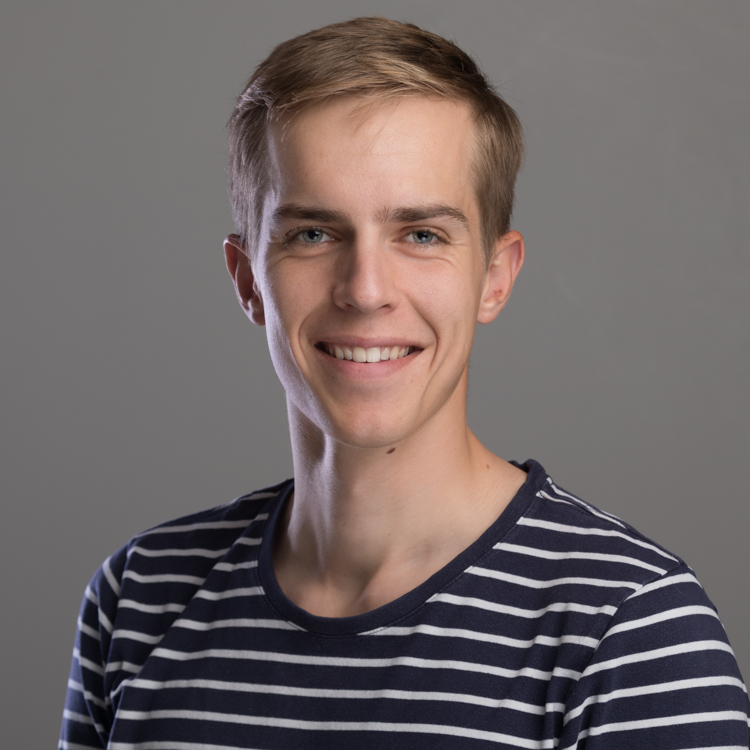
- David Kampman

Personal information
- Nationality: Dutch
- Born: 2 January 1997 (age 29)

Sport
- Country: Netherlands
- Sport: Rowing
- Event: Lightweight quadruple sculls
Medal record
World Championships
Bronze medal – third place	2019 Ottensheim	Lwt quad sculls
European Championships
Silver medal – second place	2019 Lucerne	Lwt quad sculls

David Kampman (born 2 January 1997) is a Dutch rower. Originally from Rotterdam, he moved to Amsterdam for his studies. He used to row for A.A.S.R. Skøll in Amsterdam, Netherlands.

He won a silver medal in the LM4X at the 2019 European Rowing Championships and a bronze medal at the 2019 World Rowing Championships.
