= Lü Fanpu =

Chinese rower

Personal information
- Nationality: Chinese
- Born: 5 December 1992 (age 33)

Sport
- Country: Chinese
- Sport: Rowing
- Event: Lightweight quadruple sculls
Medal record
World Championships
Gold medal – first place	2019 Ottensheim	Lwt quad sculls

Lü Fanpu (Chinese: 吕凡普; pinyin: Lǚ Fánpǔ; born 5 December 1992) is a Chinese rower.

He won a medal at the 2019 World Rowing Championships.
