= Chen Sensen =

Chinese rower (born 1996)

Personal information
- Nationality: Chinese
- Born: 10 May 1996 (age 30)

Sport
- Country: Chinese
- Sport: Rowing
- Event: Lightweight quadruple sculls
Medal record
Men's rowing
Representing China
World Championships
Gold medal – first place	2019 Ottensheim	Lwt quad sculls
Silver medal – second place	2022 Račice	Lwt quad sculls
Asian Games
Silver medal – second place	2018 Jakarta-Palembang	Double sculls

Chen Sensen (Chinese: 陈森森; pinyin: Chén Sēnsēn; born 10 May 1996) is a Chinese rower.

He won a medal at the 2019 World Rowing Championships.
