= Damion Eigenberg =

Dutch rower (born 1996)

Personal information
- Nicknames: David Eikenburk, Big D, el Patron,
- Nationality: Dutch
- Born: 3 December 1996 (age 29)
- Height: 1.76 m (5 ft 9 in)

Sport
- Country: Netherlands
- Sport: Rowing
- Event: Lightweight quadruple sculls
- Club: A.G.S.R. Gyas & KZ&RV Neptunus
Medal record
World Championships
Bronze medal – third place	2019 Ottensheim	Lwt quad sculls

Damion Eigenberg (born 3 December 1996) is a Dutch rower.

He won a medal at the 2019 World Rowing Championships.
