= Bjorn van den Ende =

Dutch rower

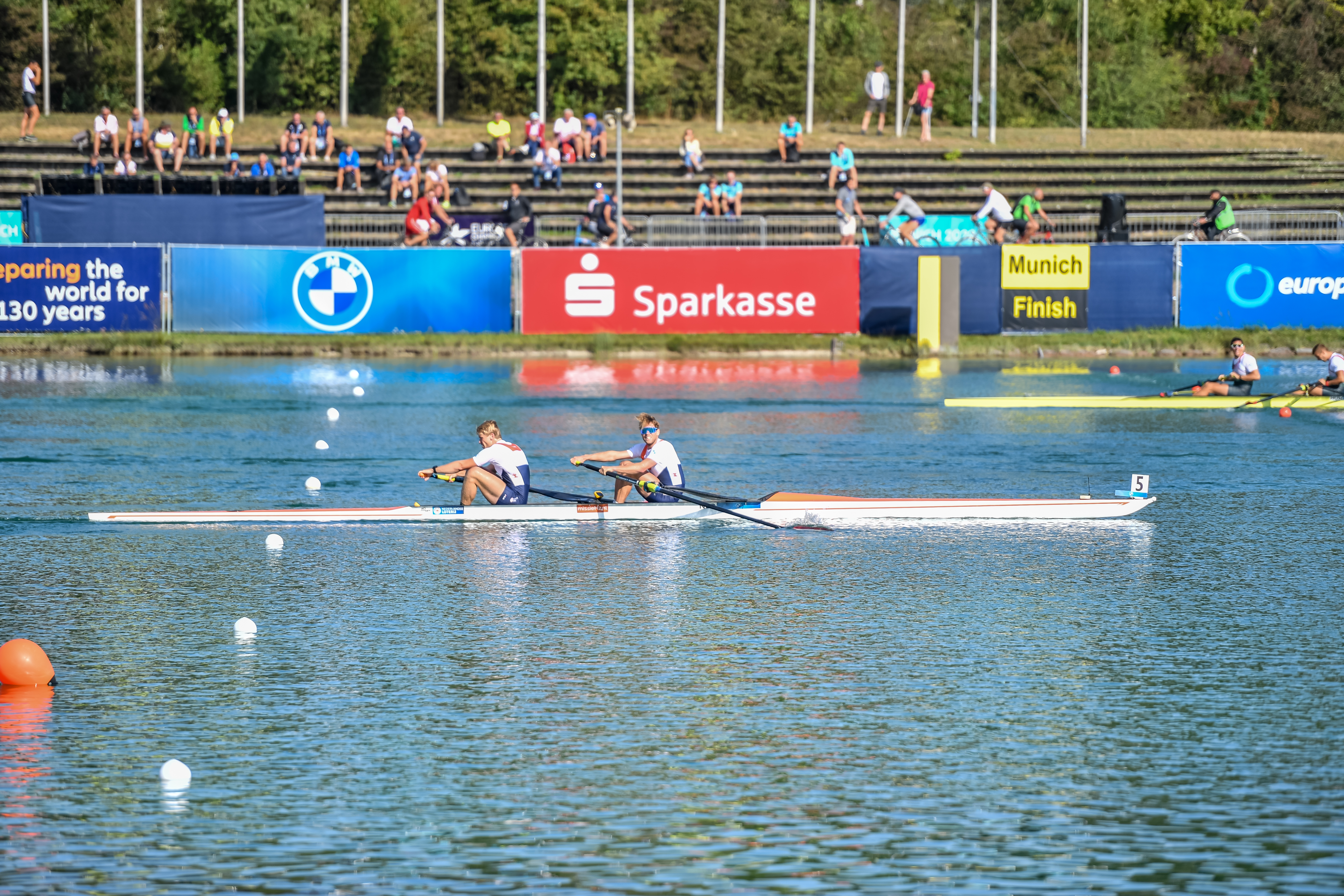

Personal information
- Nationality: Dutch
- Born: 10 January 1986 (age 40) Naarden, Netherlands
- Height: 1.88 m (6 ft 2 in)
- Weight: 82 kg (181 lb)

Sport
- Country: Netherlands
- Sport: Rowing
- Event: Eight
- Club: A.A.S.R. Skøll

Achievements and titles
- Olympic finals: Tokyo 2020 M8+
Medal record
Men's rowing
Representing the Netherlands
World Championships
| Silver medal – second place | 2019 Ottensheim | Eight |
European Championships
| Bronze medal – third place | 2019 Lucerne | Eight |
| Bronze medal – third place | 2017 Račice | Eight |

Bjorn van den Ende (born 10 January 1986) is a Dutch representative rower. He has competed for the Netherlands as both a lightweight and heavyweight. He competed in the men's lightweight coxless four event at the Rio 2016 Olympics and in the Dutch heavyweight men's eight at Tokyo 2020.

== Representative rowing career ==
After the Rio Olympics at age 30, he switched from lightweight to heavyweight rowing. From 2017, he was seated in the Men's Eight the 'Holland 8', won silver at the 2019 World Rowing Championships and thus qualifying for the 2020 Summer Olympics in Tokyo. At Tokyo 2020 the Dutch men's eight won their heat, then finished 5th in the A final for an overall fifth placing at the Olympic regatta.
