= Chen Fang (rower) =

Chinese rower

Personal information
- Nationality: Chinese
- Born: 1 June 1993 (age 33)

Sport
- Country: China
- Sport: Rowing
- Event: Lightweight quadruple sculls
Medal record
World Championships
Gold medal – first place	2018 Plovdiv	Lwt quadruple sculls
Silver medal – second place	2019 Ottensheim	Lwt quadruple sculls

Chen Fang (born 1 June 1993) is a Chinese rower.

She won a medal at the 2019 World Rowing Championships.
