= Vangelys Pereira =

Brazilian rower

Personal information
- Full name: Vangelys Reinke Pereira
- Nationality: Brazilian
- Born: 17 March 1991 (age 35)

Sport
- Country: Brazil
- Sport: Rowing
- Event: Lightweight coxless pair
Medal record
World Championships
Bronze medal – third place	2019 Ottensheim	Lwt coxless pair

Vangelys Reinke Pereira (born 17 March 1991) is a Brazilian rower. He won a medal at the 2019 World Rowing Championships.
