= Wu Qiang (rower) =

Chinese rower

Personal information
- Nationality: Chinese
- Born: 15 August 1993 (age 32)

Sport
- Country: China
- Sport: Rowing
- Event: Lightweight quadruple sculls
Medal record
World Championships
Gold medal – first place	2018 Plovdiv	Lwt quadruple sculls
Silver medal – second place	2019 Ottensheim	Lwt quadruple sculls

Wu Qiang (Chinese: 吴强; pinyin: Wú Qiáng; born 15 August 1993) is a Chinese rower.

She won a medal at the 2019 World Rowing Championships.
