= Silvia Crosio =

Italian rower (born 1999)

Personal information
- Nationality: Italian
- Born: 27 April 1999 (age 27) italy
- Height: 170 cm (5 ft 7 in)
- Weight: 59 kg (130 lb)

Sport
- Country: Italy
- Sport: Rowing
- Event: Lightweight quadruple sculls
- Club: Amici del Fiume
Medal record
Women's rowing
Representing Italy
World Championships
Gold medal – first place	2019 Ottensheim	Lwt quadruple sculls
Gold medal – first place	2022 Račice	Lwt quadruple sculls
European Championships
Gold medal – first place	2020 Poznań	Lwt quadruple sculls
Gold medal – first place	2022 Oberschleißheim	Lwt quadruple sculls
Bronze medal – third place	2024 Szeged	Lwt double sculls

Silvia Crosio (born 27 April 1999) is an Italian lightweight rower who won back-to-back world championships in the women's lightweight quad scull at the 2019 World Rowing Championships and 2022 World Rowing Championships.
