= Yuan Xiaoyu =

Chinese rower

Personal information
- Nationality: Chinese
- Born: 19 August 1994 (age 31)

Sport
- Country: China
- Sport: Rowing
- Event: Lightweight quadruple sculls
Medal record
World Championships
Silver medal – second place	2019 Ottensheim	Lwt quadruple sculls

Yuan Xiaoyu (born 19 August 1994) is a Chinese rower who won a silver medal at the 2019 World Rowing Championships.
