= Fini Sturm =

German rower

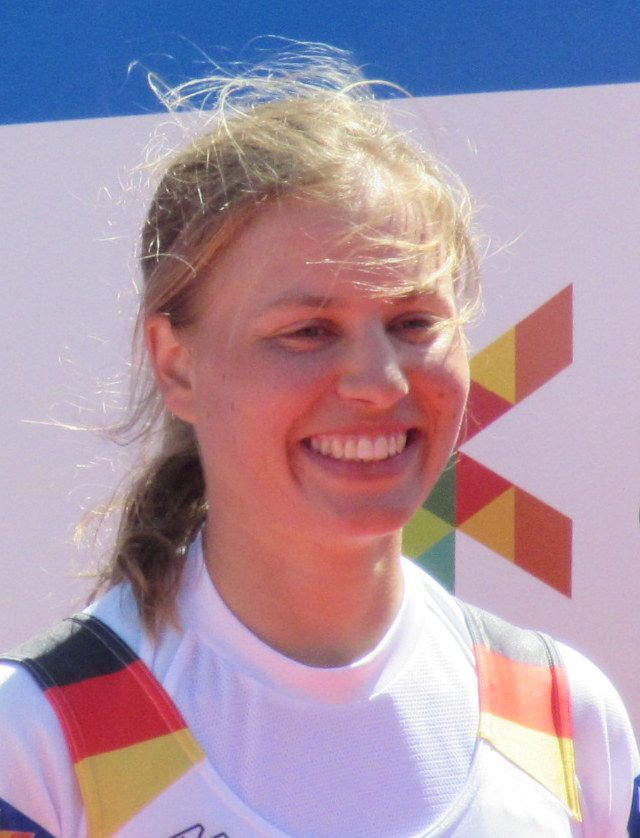
- Sturm in 2016

Personal information
- Full name: Ronja Fini Sturm
- Nationality: German
- Born: 11 September 1995 (age 30) Berlin, Germany
- Height: 1.65 m (5 ft 5 in)
- Weight: 55 kg (121 lb)

Sport
- Country: Germany
- Sport: Rowing
- Event(s): Lightweight double sculls, Lightweight quadruple sculls
- Club: Ruder-Club-Havel Brandenburg e.V.
Medal record
Women's rowing
Representing Germany
World Championships
Bronze medal – third place	2018 Plovdiv	Lwt quad sculls
Bronze medal – third place	2019 Ottensheim	Lwt quad sculls
European Championships
Silver medal – second place	2015 Poznań	Lwt double sculls
Silver medal – second place	2016 Brandenburg	Lwt double sculls
World Championships (U23)
Gold medal – first place	2014 Varese	Lwt quad sculls

Ronja Fini Sturm (born 11 September 1995) is a German rower. She competed in the 2015 European Rowing Championships in Poznań winning a silver medal. At the 2016 Summer Olympics in Rio de Janeiro, she competed in women's lightweight double sculls with teammate Marie-Louise Dräger. They finished in 11th place.
