= Rowing at the 2018 Asian Games – Men's double sculls =

Men's double sculls at the 2018 Asian Games
- Venue: Jakabaring Lake
- Date: 19–23 August 2018
- Competitors: 18 from 9 nations

Medalists
| gold medal | Shakhboz Kholmurzaev; Shakhboz Abdujabborov | Uzbekistan |
| silver medal | Zhang Zhiyuan; Chen Sensen | China |
| bronze medal | Prem Nampratueng; Jaruwat Saensuk | Thailand |

The men's double sculls competition at the 2018 Asian Games was held on 19–23 August at the JSC Lake.

== Schedule ==
All times are Western Indonesia Time (UTC+07:00)

| Date | Time | Event |
|---|---|---|
| Sunday, 19 August 2018 | 09:50 | Heats |
| Tuesday, 21 August 2018 | 09:40 | Repechage |
| Thursday, 23 August 2018 | 09:20 | Finals |

== Results ==
=== Heats ===
- Qualification: 1–2 → Final A (FA), 3–5 → Repechage (R)

==== Heat 1 ====
| Rank | Team | Time | Notes |
|---|---|---|---|
| 1 | South Korea (KOR); Kim Hwi-gwan; Kim Jong-jin | 7:06.29 | FA |
| 2 | Thailand (THA); Prem Nampratueng; Jaruwat Saensuk | 7:07.42 | FA |
| 3 | China (CHN); Zhang Zhiyuan; Chen Sensen | 7:18.09 | R |
| 4 | Kazakhstan (KAZ); Anastas Shashkov; Yevgeniy Vassilyev | 7:45.76 | R |

==== Heat 2 ====
| Rank | Team | Time | Notes |
|---|---|---|---|
| 1 | India (IND); Om Prakash; Sawarn Singh | 7:10.26 | FA |
| 2 | Japan (JPN); Keita Yamao; Tomokazu Kuribara | 7:12.70 | FA |
| 3 | Uzbekistan (UZB); Shakhboz Kholmurzaev; Shakhboz Abdujabborov | 7:17.55 | R |
| 4 | Iran (IRI); Mohsen Shadi; Aghel Habibian | 7:20.77 | R |
| 5 | Chinese Taipei (TPE); Wang Ming-hui; Hsu Wen-chuan | 7:21.59 | R |

=== Repechage ===
- Qualification: 1–2 → Final A (FA), 3–5 → Final B (FB)

| Rank | Team | Time | Notes |
|---|---|---|---|
| 1 | China (CHN); Zhang Zhiyuan; Chen Sensen | 6:59.74 | FA |
| 2 | Uzbekistan (UZB); Shakhboz Kholmurzaev; Shakhboz Abdujabborov | 7:05.19 | FA |
| 3 | Iran (IRI); Mohsen Shadi; Aghel Habibian | 7:12.40 | FB |
| 4 | Chinese Taipei (TPE); Wang Ming-hui; Hsu Wen-chuan | 7:13.25 | FB |
| 5 | Kazakhstan (KAZ); Anastas Shashkov; Yevgeniy Vassilyev | 7:45.39 | FB |

=== Finals ===
==== Final B ====
| Rank | Team | Time |
|---|---|---|
| 1 | Chinese Taipei (TPE); Wang Ming-hui; Hsu Wen-chuan | 7:00.48 |
| 2 | Kazakhstan (KAZ); Anastas Shashkov; Yevgeniy Vassilyev | 7:30.18 |
| 3 | Iran (IRI); Mohsen Shadi; Aghel Habibian | 8:24.88 |

==== Final A ====
| Rank | Team | Time |
|---|---|---|
| 1st place, gold medalist(s) | Uzbekistan (UZB); Shakhboz Kholmurzaev; Shakhboz Abdujabborov | 6:48.19 |
| 2nd place, silver medalist(s) | China (CHN); Zhang Zhiyuan; Chen Sensen | 6:48.65 |
| 3rd place, bronze medalist(s) | Thailand (THA); Prem Nampratueng; Jaruwat Saensuk | 6:49.82 |
| 4 | India (IND); Om Prakash; Sawarn Singh | 6:50.91 |
| 5 | South Korea (KOR); Kim Hwi-gwan; Kim Jong-jin | 7:00.42 |
| 6 | Japan (JPN); Keita Yamao; Tomokazu Kuribara | 7:01.26 |
