= Maksim Telitsyn =

Russian rower

Personal information
- Nationality: Russian
- Born: 28 December 1990 (age 35) Samara, Russia

Sport
- Country: Russia
- Sport: Rowing
- Event: Lightweight coxless pair
Medal record
World Championships
Silver medal – second place	2019 Ottensheim	Lwt coxless pair

Maksim Telitsyn (born 28 December 1990) is a Russian rower.

He won a medal at the 2019 World Rowing Championships.
