= Indoor rowing at the 2017 World Games – Men's Open 2000 metres =

Men's Open 2000 metres at the 2017 World Games
- Venue: Multifunctional Hall
- Location: Jelcz-Laskowice, Poland
- Dates: 26 July
- Competitors: 14 from 14 nations

Medalists
gold medal	Oliver Zeidler	Germany
silver medal	Bartosz Zablocki	Poland
bronze medal	Anton Bondarenko	Ukraine

The men's open 2000 metres event in indoor rowing at the 2017 World Games took place on the 26 July 2017 at the Multifunctional Hall in Jelcz-Laskowice.

== Results ==
GR = Games Record

Rank	Athlete	NOC	Time	Notes
1st place, gold medalist(s)	Oliver Zeidler	Germany	5:42.0	GR
2nd place, silver medalist(s)	Bartosz Zablocki	Poland	5:44.5	
3rd place, bronze medalist(s)	Anton Bonkarenko	Ukraine	5:46.5	
4	Bendegúz Pétervári-Molnár	Hungary	5:51.5	
5	Pavel Shurmei	Belarus	5:52.8	
6	Graham Benton	Great Britain	5:54.4	
7	Petr Ourednicek	Czech Republic	5:56.7	
8	Luke Wollenschlaeger	South Africa	6:07.2	
9	Georgios Gioupis	Greece	6:10.7	
10	Jozef Pavlica	Slovakia	6:13.5	
11	Doohwa Jin	South Korea	6:17.3	
12	Rovoams Gavrilovs	Latvia	6:21.9	
13	Jorge Palacios	Peru	6:26.8	
14	Juan Farrugia	Malta	6:35.8	
