= Greta Martinelli =

Italian rower (born 2000)

Personal information
- Nationality: Italian
- Born: 3 December 2000 (age 25)

Sport
- Country: Italy
- Sport: Rowing
- Event: Lightweight quadruple sculls
Medal record
World Championships
Gold medal – first place	2019 Ottensheim	Lwt quadruple sculls
European Championships
Gold medal – first place	2020 Poznan	Lwt quadruple sculls

Greta Martinelli (born 3 December 2000) is an Italian rower.

She won a gold medal in the Lightweight Women's Quadruple Sculls category at the 2019 World Rowing Championships.
