= Isak Žvegelj =

Slovenian rower (born 2000)

Personal information
- Full name: Isak Ivan Žvegelj
- Nationality: Slovenian
- Born: 3 July 2000 (age 25) Bled, Slovenia

Sport
- Sport: Rowing
- Event: Sculls
- Coached by: Miloš Janša

Isak Ivan Žvegelj (born 3 July 2000) is a Slovenian rower. He competed at the 2024 Paris Olympics.

== Early life ==
From Bled, Slovenia, he was initially a swimmer but later focused on rowing. He studies computational cognitive science in the United States at the University of Pennsylvania.

== Career ==
He competed in the double sculls at the 2020 European Rowing U23 Championships in Duisburg, Germany.

Coached by Miloš Janša, he was assured of selection for the 2024 Olympics after the completion of the World Olympic Qualifications in Lucerne, Switzerland in June 2024. Competing at the 2024 Paris Olympics in the men's single sculls event, he qualified for the quarter finals via the repechage.

As of November 25, 2024, Žvegelj has held the 10,000 meter world record on the Concept2 Indoor Rower with Slides with a time of 31:48.3 with a 1:35.4/500m split.

== Personal life ==
He is the son of Slovenian rower and Olympic Games medalist Denis Žvegelj. He has his own YouTube channel as an outlet for his creativity, and during the COVID-19 pandemic started his own podcast which he produced in Slovenian and English.
