= Aranka Kops =

Dutch rower (born 1995)

Personal information
- Nationality: Dutch
- Born: 8 October 1995 (age 30)

Sport
- Country: Netherlands
- Sport: Rowing
- Event: Eight
Medal record
World Championships
Silver medal – second place	2019 Ottensheim	Eight

Aranka Kops (born 8 October 1995) is a Dutch rowing cox.

She steered the Dutch men's eight to their silver medal at the 2019 World Rowing Championships.
