= Yauheni Zalaty =

Belarusian rower

- Yauheni Zalaty (left) at the medal ceremony in Paris 2024.

Personal information
- Nationality: Belarusian
- Born: 9 September 1999 (age 27) Krasnapollye, Belarus

Sport
- Sport: Rowing
Medal record
Men's rowing
Representing Individual Neutral Athletes
Olympic Games
Silver medal – second place	2024 Paris	Single sculls
World Championships
Silver medal – second place	2026 Amsterdam	Single sculls
Bronze medal – third place	2025 Shanghai	Single sculls
European Championships
Gold medal – first place	2025 Plovdiv	Single sculls
Silver medal – second place	2026 Varese	Single sculls

Yauheni Zalaty (Belarusian: Яўгеній Залаты; born 9 September 1999) is a rower from Belarus. He won a silver medal in the single sculls at the 2024 Paris Olympics competing as an Individual Neutral Athlete.

== Career ==
He won a silver medal at the 2017 World Rowing Junior Championships in Trakai, Lithuania.

He won the B final at the 2023 World Rowing Championships in the Men's single sculls.

He won bronze in the single sculls at the 2024 World Rowing Cup II in Lucerne, Switzerland in May 2024.

He was granted selection to compete at the 2024 Summer Olympics in Paris as an Individual Neutral Athlete in July 2024, despite the suspension of the Belarusian federation. He competed in the single sculls and won a silver medal.

On 17 September 2024, Zalaty alongside other state officials, including military, attended the official ceremony at the Palace of Independence where he was presented with state awards by Belarusian President Aleksandr Lukashenko.

He won the gold medal in the single sculls at the 2025 European Rowing Championships in Plovdiv. Zalaty won the bronze medal in the single sculls at the 2025 World Rowing Championships in Shanghai, China.
