= Simon van Dorp =

Dutch rower

- Simon van Dorp (right) at the medal ceremony in Paris 2024.

Personal information
- Full name: Simon Hendrik van Dorp
- Nationality: Dutch
- Born: 10 April 1997 (age 29) Amsterdam, Netherlands
- Height: 203 cm (6 ft 8 in)

Sport
- Country: Netherlands
- Sport: Rowing

Achievements and titles
- Olympic finals: Tokyo 2020 M8+
Medal record
Men's rowing
Representing Netherlands
Olympic Games
Bronze medal – third place	2024 Paris	Single sculls
World Championships
Gold medal – first place	2026 Amsterdam	Double sculls
Gold medal – first place	2026 Amsterdam	Mixed double sculls
Silver medal – second place	2019 Ottensheim	Eight
Silver medal – second place	2023 Belgrade	Single sculls
European Championships
Silver medal – second place	2018 Glasgow	Eight
Silver medal – second place	2023 Bled	Quadruple sculls
Silver medal – second place	2025 Plovdiv	Quadruple sculls
Bronze medal – third place	2020 Poznań	Eight
Bronze medal – third place	2021 Varese	Eight

Simon Hendrik van Dorp (born 10 April 1997) is a Dutch rower. He won a bronze medal in the single sculls at the 2024 Olympic Games. He previously won medals at the 2019 and 2023 World Rowing Championships.

== University ==
Van Dorp attended the University of Washington from 2017 to 2020 where he majored in political economy. In 2020 van Dorp took a year off from university to train with the Dutch Olympic Team for the 2020 Summer Olympics in Tokyo.

=== 2017 (Freshman) ===
In 2017, van Dorp's freshman year at the University of Washington, he rowed in the Men's Varsity 8+ that won the Oregon State Classic; won the Stanford Invitational against the University of Wisconsin-Madison and Stanford University; won the Schoch Cup against University of California, Berkeley and won the Windermere Cup. In the Men's Varsity 8+ he also won at the Pac-12 Championships and finished second in the grand final at the Intercollegiate Rowing Association (IRA) Regatta.

=== 2018 (Sophomore) ===
In his sophomore year, van Dorp rowed in the UW Varsity 8+ and 2nd Varsity 8+. He was in the Varsity 8+ which beat Dartmouth College at the Las Vegas Invitational, also beating Santa Clara University and Gonzaga University. van Dorp was also in the Varsity crew which had match race wins over Stanford University and Oregon State University. He rowed the Second Varsity 8+ which was victorious at California and won the national championship at IRAs. He rowed in the Varsity 8+ which beat UBC & Oxford Brookes in the Windermere Cup and won Pac-12 Championships. On 20 February 2018, van Dorp pulled an 18:13.2 (1:31/500m) 6k erg time, giving him the world record for the distance.

=== 2019 (Junior) ===
In 2019, van Dorp won the program's Pigott Award as the most inspirational member of the team. He rowed in the UW Second Varsity 8+ which won its event at the 2018 Head of the Lake. He rowed in the Varsity 8+ which won races against Cornell, Marist and Oregon State at the Lake Las Vegas Invitational; beat Northeastern, Stanford and Oregon State at Redwood Shores; beat California for the Schoch Cup; won the Windermere Cup on Opening Day and earned the silver medal at IRAs. He rowed in the Second Varsity 8+ that won the Pac-12 Championship.

=== 2020 (Senior) ===
Van Dorp took the 2019–2020 school year off to train for the 2020 Olympic Games.
