= Zhang Zhiyuan (rower) =

Chinese rower

Personal information
- Nationality: Chinese
- Born: 25 April 1994 (age 32)

Sport
- Country: Chinese
- Sport: Rowing
- Event: Lightweight quadruple sculls
Medal record
Men's rowing
Representing China
World Championships
Gold medal – first place	2019 Ottensheim	Lwt quad sculls
Asian Games
Silver medal – second place	2018 Jakarta-Palembang	Double sculls

Zhang Zhiyuan (simplified Chinese: 张志远; traditional Chinese: 張志遠; pinyin: Zhāng Zhìyuǎn; born 25 April 1994) is a Chinese rower.

He won a medal at the 2019 World Rowing Championships.
