= Oliver Zeidler =

German swimmer and rower

- Oliver Zeidler in 2024 at the Summer Olympics

Personal information
- Born: 24 July 1996 (age 30) Dachau, Bavaria, Germany
- Height: 2.03 m (6 ft 8 in)
- Weight: 103 kg (227 lb)
- Relatives: Hans-Johann Färber (grandfather)

Sport
- Country: Germany
- Sport: Rowing
- Event: Single sculls
- Club: Frankfurter Rudergesellschaft Germania von 1869 e.V.
Medal record
Men's rowing
Representing Germany
Olympic Games
| Gold medal – first place | 2024 Paris | Single sculls |
World Championships
| Gold medal – first place | 2019 Ottensheim | Single sculls |
| Gold medal – first place | 2022 Račice | Single sculls |
| Gold medal – first place | 2023 Belgrade | Single sculls |
| Gold medal – first place | 2026 Amsterdam | Single sculls |
| Silver medal – second place | 2025 Shanghai | Single sculls |
European Championships
| Gold medal – first place | 2019 Lucerne | Single sculls |
| Gold medal – first place | 2021 Varese | Single sculls |
| Gold medal – first place | 2024 Szeged | Single sculls |
| Gold medal – first place | 2026 Varese | Single sculls |
| Bronze medal – third place | 2023 Bled | Single sculls |

Oliver Zeidler (German pronunciation: [ˈɔlivɐ ˈtsaɪdlɐ]; born 24 July 1996) is a German rower and former swimmer. He is the reigning Olympic and world champion in the men's single sculls, which he first won at the 2019 World Rowing Championships and defended in 2022 and 2023. He is the 2023 World Games champion in indoor rowing in the open men's 2000 m class.

== Family ==
Zeidler was born in 1996. He was born into a rowing family, with grandfather Hans-Johann Färber a double-Olympic medallist (gold in 1972 and bronze in 1976, both in the coxed four boat class). His grandfather trains his sister Marie (born 1999) who has won medals at 2016 and 2017 World Rowing Junior Championships. Oliver Zeidler is trained by his father, Heino Zeidler, himself a former junior world champion rower and a senior representative rower for Germany in the 1990s. The Zeidlers live in Erding. His aunt, Judith Zeidler, is an Olympic gold and bronze medallist in rowing and his aunt is married to double-Olympian Matthias Ungemach.

== Swimming ==
Zeidler measures 2.03 metres (6 ft 8 in). He started swimming at age seven. At the 2015 German year championships in Berlin, he won gold in the 100 metres freestyle event for the year 1996 competition, silver for the same performance in the open category (years 1994 to 1996), and bronze in the 200 metres freestyle. He ended his competitive swimming career in February 2017.

== Rowing ==
Curious about rowing, Zeidler first tried out a single scull in September 2016 at the Oberschleißheim Regatta Course where his sister trains. Less than a year later, Zeidler won the open men's 2000 m class in indoor rowing at the 2017 World Games in Wrocław, Poland. The previous month, Zeidler had come third at the German under-23 championships in single scull.

Zeidler's first international rowing regatta was the 2018 World Rowing Cup I in Belgrade. The heat was only his fourth race on a rowing course. In the A-final, he surprised by winning bronze in the open men's single scull, beaten by Czech incumbent world champion Ondřej Synek and the Swiss Roman Röösli. At the World Rowing Cup II race, the Czech and Swiss were not at the start and Zeidler again won bronze, this time beaten by the New Zealander Robbie Manson and the German champion Tim Ole Naske. At the World Rowing Cup III race, Zeidler won silver, again beaten by Manson. But more importantly, fellow German Naske came sixth in that race meaning that Zeidler was then selected as the German single sculling representative for the 2018 World Rowing Championships. He made the A-final at the 2018 World Championships but finished in overall sixth place.

2019 would be Zeidler's break-out year as a single-sculler. He took gold at the European Championships in Lucerne and at the 2019 World Rowing Championships in Ottensheim he won all three of his preliminary races and then in the A final contested one of the closest and toughest world class sculling events witnessed. Zeidler led at the 500 m mark but saw his rival Sverri Nielsen and the Dutchman, Stef Broenink, have a lead over him at the next two marks where Zeidler sat fourth and then third. Zeidler stuck to his race plan and his long work through the water saw him come over the top of his rivals in the last few strokes, in a finish where the top five scullers were separated by only a 1-second spread.

In 2023, he won his third Diamond Challenge Sculls (the premier event for single sculls) at the Henley Royal Regatta, remained unbeaten at all three World Cups and crowned himself World Champion again in Belgrade. This performance also owned him the Men's Rower of the year award 2023 and the qualification for his second Olympics.

In 2024, Zeidler kicked off the Olympic racing season with a win at the World Rowing Cup held in Varese, Italy, on 14 April. At the end of April 2024, Zeidler won gold in the European Rowing Championships in Szeged, Hungary. In July, he won a fourth Diamond Sculls at Henley. At the 2024 Summer Olympics Zeidler placed first in his heat, quarterfinal and semifinal, in which he achieved an Olympic best time of 6:35.77. He went on to win the final, beating reigning Olympic Champion Stefanos Ntouskos.
