= Christopher Reinhardt =

German rower

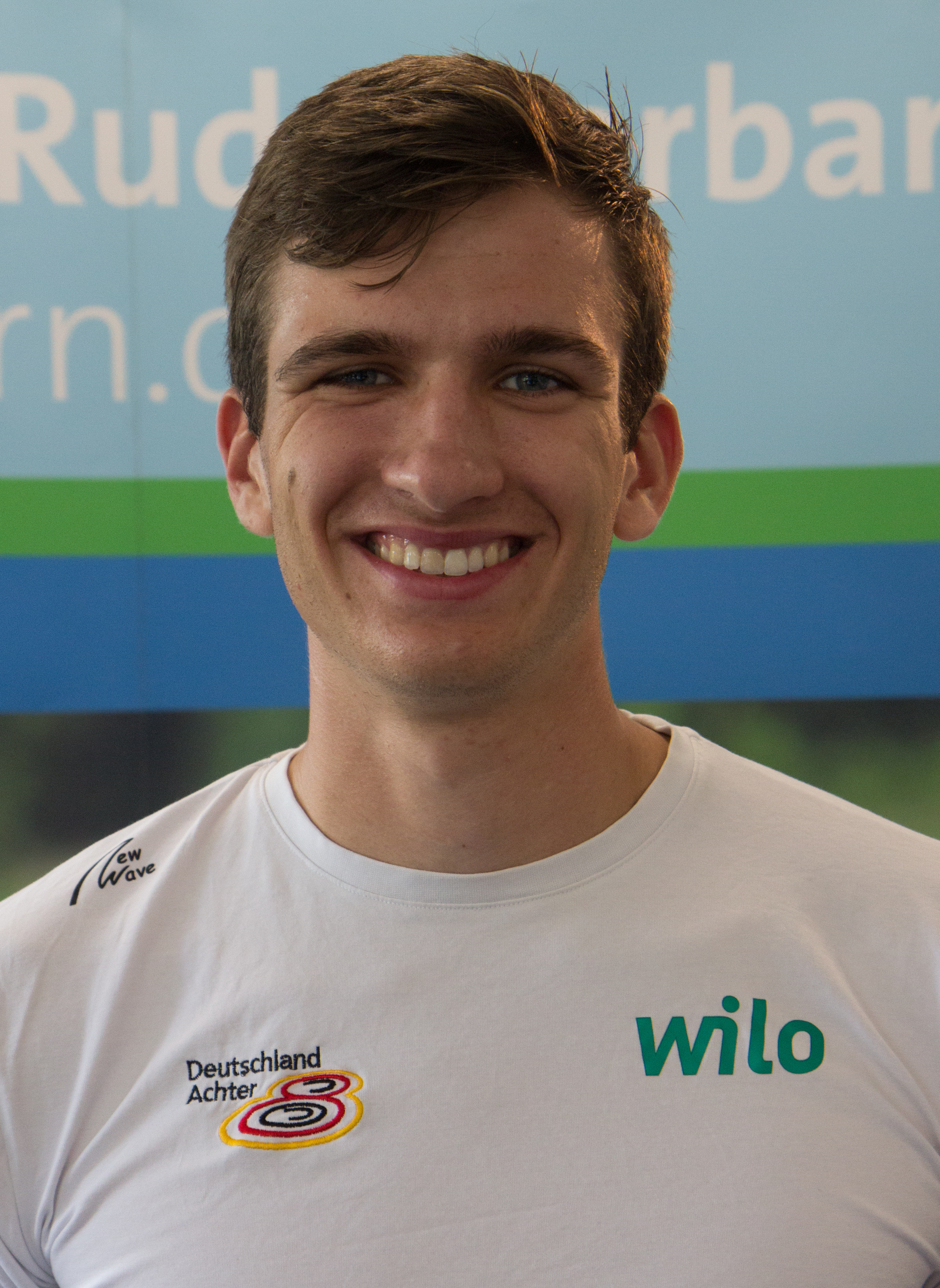
- Media day of the rowing association in the rowing academy Ratzeburg on September 6, 2017: Christopher Reinhardt

Personal information
- Nationality: German
- Born: 3 July 1997 (age 28)
- Height: 2.00 m (6 ft 7 in)
- Weight: 96 kg (212 lb)

Sport
- Country: Germany
- Sport: Rowing
- Event: Eight
- Club: Ruderverein Dorsten e.V.
Medal record
World Championships
Gold medal – first place	2019 Ottensheim	Eight

Christopher Reinhardt (born 3 July 1997) is a German representative rower and a former world champion.

He won a his world championship title in the German men's senior eight at the 2019 World Rowing Championships.
