= Jasper Tissen =

Dutch rower (born 1992)

Personal information
- Nationality: Dutch
- Born: 15 September 1992 (age 33)
- Height: 1.99 m (6 ft 6 in)
- Weight: 96 kg (212 lb)

Sport
- Country: Netherlands
- Sport: Rowing
- Event: Eight

Achievements and titles
- Olympic finals: Tokyo 2020 M8+
Medal record
World Championships
Silver medal – second place	2019 Ottensheim	Eight

Jasper Tissen (born 15 September 1992) is a Dutch rower.

He won a medal at the 2019 World Rowing Championships.
