= Leonie Pieper =

German rower (born 1992)

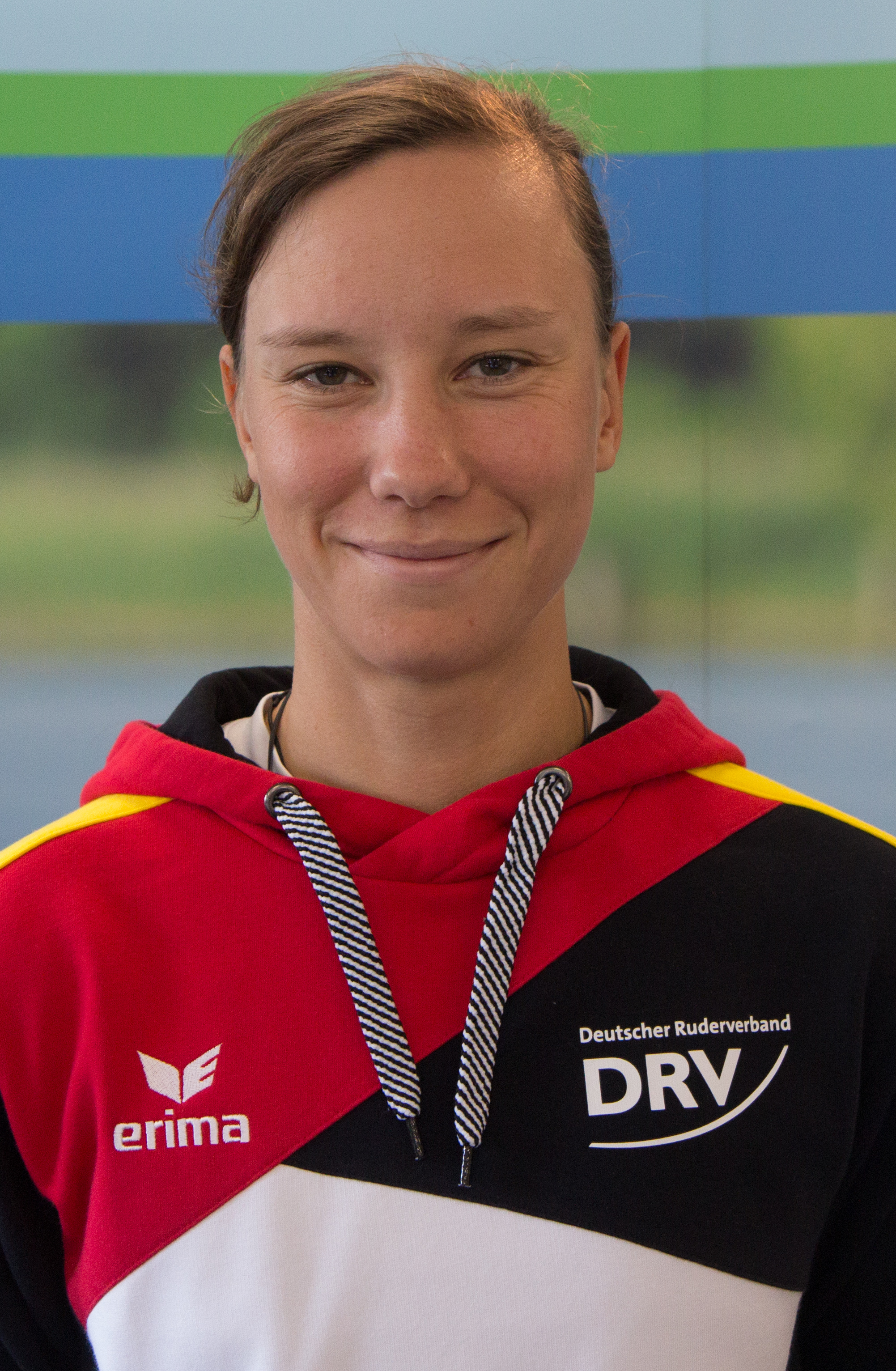
- Leonie Pieper in 2017.

Personal information
- Nationality: German
- Born: 24 August 1992 (age 33) Düsseldorf, Germany
- Height: 1.73 m (5 ft 8 in)
- Weight: 57 kg (126 lb)

Sport
- Country: Germany
- Sport: Rowing
- Event: Lightweight quadruple sculls
- Club: Ruderclub Germania Düsseldorf 1904 e.V.
Medal record
World Championships
Bronze medal – third place	2019 Ottensheim	Lwt quadruple sculls

Leonie Pieper (born 24 August 1992) is a German rower.

She won a medal at the 2019 World Rowing Championships.
