= Margaret Bertasi =

American rower

Personal information
- Nationality: American
- Born: November 1, 1992 (age 33)
- Height: 5 ft 9 in (1.74 m)
- Weight: 139 lb (63 kg)

Sport
- Country: United States
- Sport: Rowing
- Event: Lightweight coxless pair
Medal record
World Championships
Gold medal – first place	2019 Ottensheim	Lwt coxless pair

Margaret Bertasi (born November 1, 1992) is an American rower.

She won a gold medal at the 2019 World Rowing Championships.
