= Cara Stawicki =

American rower (born 1983)

Personal information
- Nationality: American
- Born: January 29, 1983 (age 43)

Sport
- Country: United States
- Sport: Rowing
- Event: Lightweight coxless pair
Medal record
World Championships
Gold medal – first place	2019 Ottensheim	Lwt coxless pair

Cara Stawicki (born January 29, 1983) is an American rower.

She won a gold medal at the 2019 World Rowing Championships.
