= Giuseppe Di Mare =

Italian rower (born 1997)

Personal information
- Nationality: Italian
- Born: 28 March 1997 (age 29) Pompei, Italy

Sport
- Country: Italy
- Sport: Rowing
- Event(s): Lightweight coxless pair, Lightweight quadruple sculls
Medal record
World Championships
Gold medal – first place	2018 Plovdiv	Lwt coxless pair
Gold medal – first place	2019 Ottensheim	Lwt coxless pair
Silver medal – second place	2017 Sarasota	Lwt Coxless pair

Giuseppe Di Mare (born 28 March 1997) is an Italian rower.

== Career ==
He competes for the club Canottieri Savoia in Naples.

He started rowing with Alfonso Scalzone, winning the gold medal in the lightweight coxless pair at the 2017 World U23 Championships in Plovdiv (Bulgaria).

He competes for Italy in the lightweight coxless pair at the 2017 World Championships in Sarasota (Florida, USA), winning the silver medal, and at the 2017 European Championships, winning the bronze medal.

He won his second world title, always in the lightweight coxless pair, at the 2018 World Championships in Plovdiv(Bulgaria), teamed up with Scalzone. He won a third World title the following year, in Linz Ottensheim (Austria), always in the lightweight coxless pair but with Raffaele Serio.

He won bronze medal in the lightweight coxless pair with Raffaele Serio at 2018 World U23 Championships in Poznan (Poland).

At 2019 World U23 Championships in Sarasota (Florida, USA) he changed boat, passing from lightweight coxless pair to lightweight double, winning a silver medal with Niels Alexander Torre.
