= Arianna Noseda =

Italian rower (born 1997)

Personal information
- Nationality: Italian
- Born: 14 December 1997 (age 28)

Sport
- Country: Italy
- Sport: Rowing
- Event: Lightweight quadruple sculls
- Club: Fiamme Rosse
Medal record
Women's rowing
Representing Italy
World Championships
Gold medal – first place	2019 Ottensheim	Lwt quadruple sculls
Gold medal – first place	2022 Račice	Lwt quadruple sculls
European Championships
Gold medal – first place	2020 Poznań	Lwt quadruple sculls
Gold medal – first place	2022 Munich	Lwt quadruple sculls
World University Games
Bronze medal – third place	2021 Chengdu	W8+

Arianna Noseda (born 14 December 1997) is an Italian lightweight rower who won back-to-back world championships in the women's lightweight quad scull at the 2019 World Rowing Championships and 2022 World Rowing Championships.
