= Sofia Tanghetti =

Italian rower

Personal information
- Nationality: Italian
- Born: 3 May 1999 (age 27)

Sport
- Country: Italy
- Sport: Rowing
- Event: Lightweight coxless pair
Medal record
World Championships
Silver medal – second place	2019 Ottensheim	Lwt coxless pair

Sofia Tanghetti (born 3 May 1999) is an Italian rower. She won a silver medal in the Lightweight Women's Pair category at the 2019 World Rowing Championships.
