= Gabriel Soares =

Italian rower (born 1997)

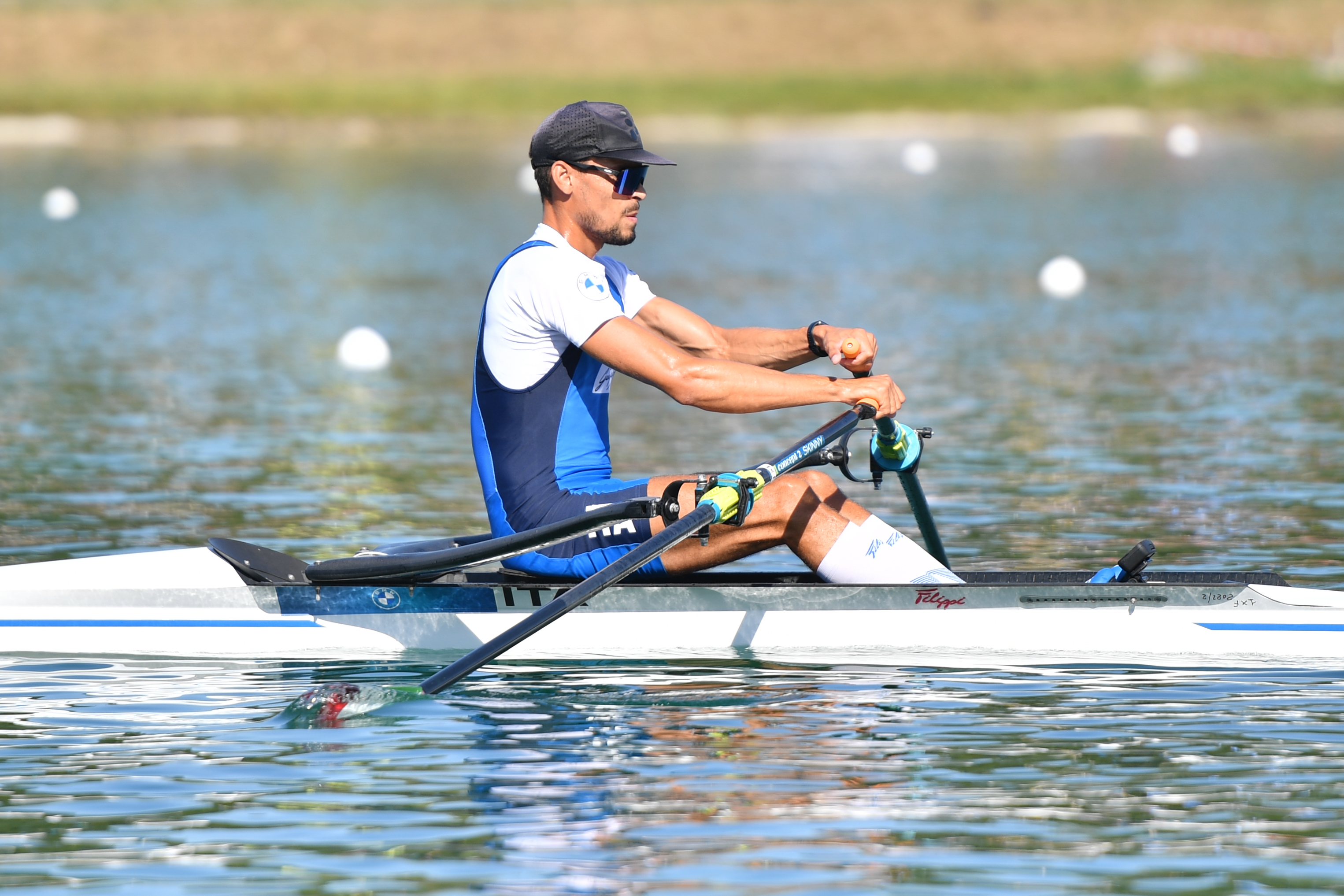
- Soares in 2022

Personal information
- Born: 22 January 1997 (age 29) Foz do Iguaçu, Brazil

Sport
- Country: Italy
- Sport: Rowing
- Event: Lightweight quadruple sculls
- Club: Marina Militare Sabaudia
Medal record
Men's rowing
Representing Italy
Olympic Games
Event	1st	2nd	3rd
Olympic Games	0	1	0
World Championships	1	1	1
European Championships	2	4	0
Mediterranean Games	0	0	0
Total	3	6	1
Silver medal – second place	2024 Paris	Lwt double sculls
World Championships
Gold medal – first place	2022 Račice	LM1x
Silver medal – second place	2019 Ottensheim	LM4x
Bronze medal – third place	2023 Belgrade	LM2x
European Championships
Gold medal – first place	2019 Lucerne	LM4x
Gold medal – first place	2020 Poznań	LM4x
Silver medal – second place	2022 Munich	LM1x
Silver medal – second place	2021 Varese	LM1x
Silver medal – second place	2022 Oberschleißheim	LM1x
Silver medal – second place	2023 Bled	LM2x
Silver medal – second place	2024 Szeged	LM2x

Gabriel Soares (born 22 January 1997) is an Italian rower.

Soares is an athlete of the Gruppo Sportivo della Marina Militare.

== Biography ==
His club is Marina militare Sabaudia. He has represented Italy since 2015 in a variety of boat sizes.

He started competing in 2010 with the club U.S. Bellagina, with Enrico Mooney. Then he moved to Gruppo sportivo of MM Sabaudia, with Franco Sancassani.

In 2015, he participated in the Italian team that won, without him, the silver medal at the European in Račice.

He was in the winning Men’s lightweight quadruple sculls team at the European Championships in 2019 and 2020 and won the Men’s lightweight single sculls at the European Championship in 2021.

== Awards ==
- European Rowing Championships

Lucerne 2019: Gold medal, LM4x.

- 2019 World Rowing Championships : silver medal LM4x.
