= Mihai Chiruță =

Romanian rower

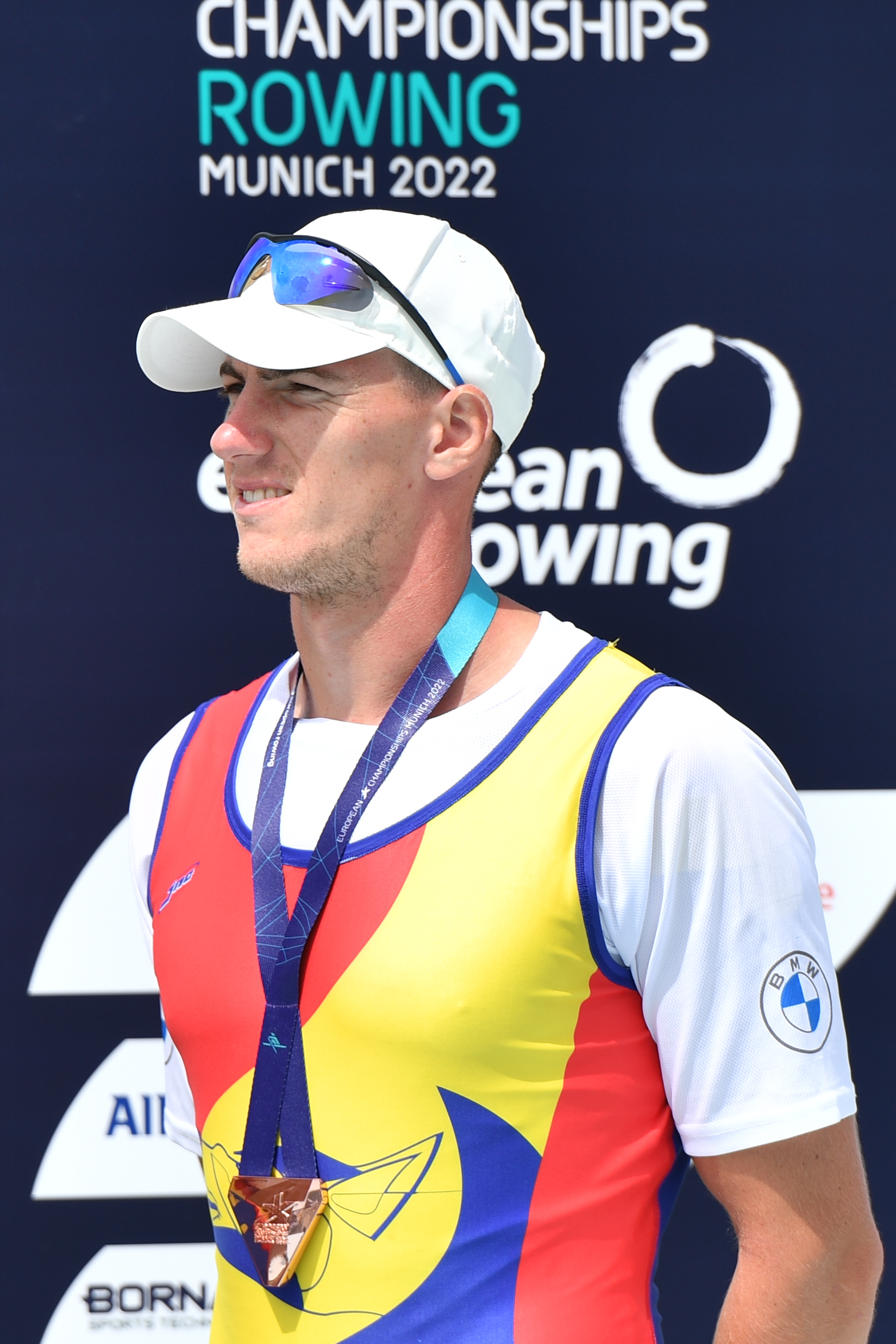

Personal information
- Full name: Mihai Chiruță
- Nationality: Romania
- Born: 26 September 1998 (age 27) Suceava

Sport
- Sport: Rowing
Medal record
Men's rowing
Representing Romania
European Championships
Bronze medal – third place	2022 Oberschleißheim	Quadruple sculls
Bronze medal – third place	2025 Plovdiv	Single sculls

Mihai Chiruță (born 26 September 1998) is a Romanian rower. born in Suceava.

He competed in the single sculls at the 2024 Summer Olympics.
