= Lorenzo Fontana (rower) =

Italian rower

Personal information
- Nationality: Italian
- Born: 28 August 1996 (age 29)

Sport
- Country: Italy
- Sport: Rowing
- Event: Lightweight quadruple sculls
Medal record
World Championships
Silver medal – second place	2019 Ottensheim	Lwt quad sculls

Lorenzo Fontana (born 28 August 1996) is an Italian rower.

He won a silver medal in the Lightweight Men's Quadruple Sculls category at the 2019 World Rowing Championships.
