= Stefanos Ntouskos =

Greek rower (born 1997)

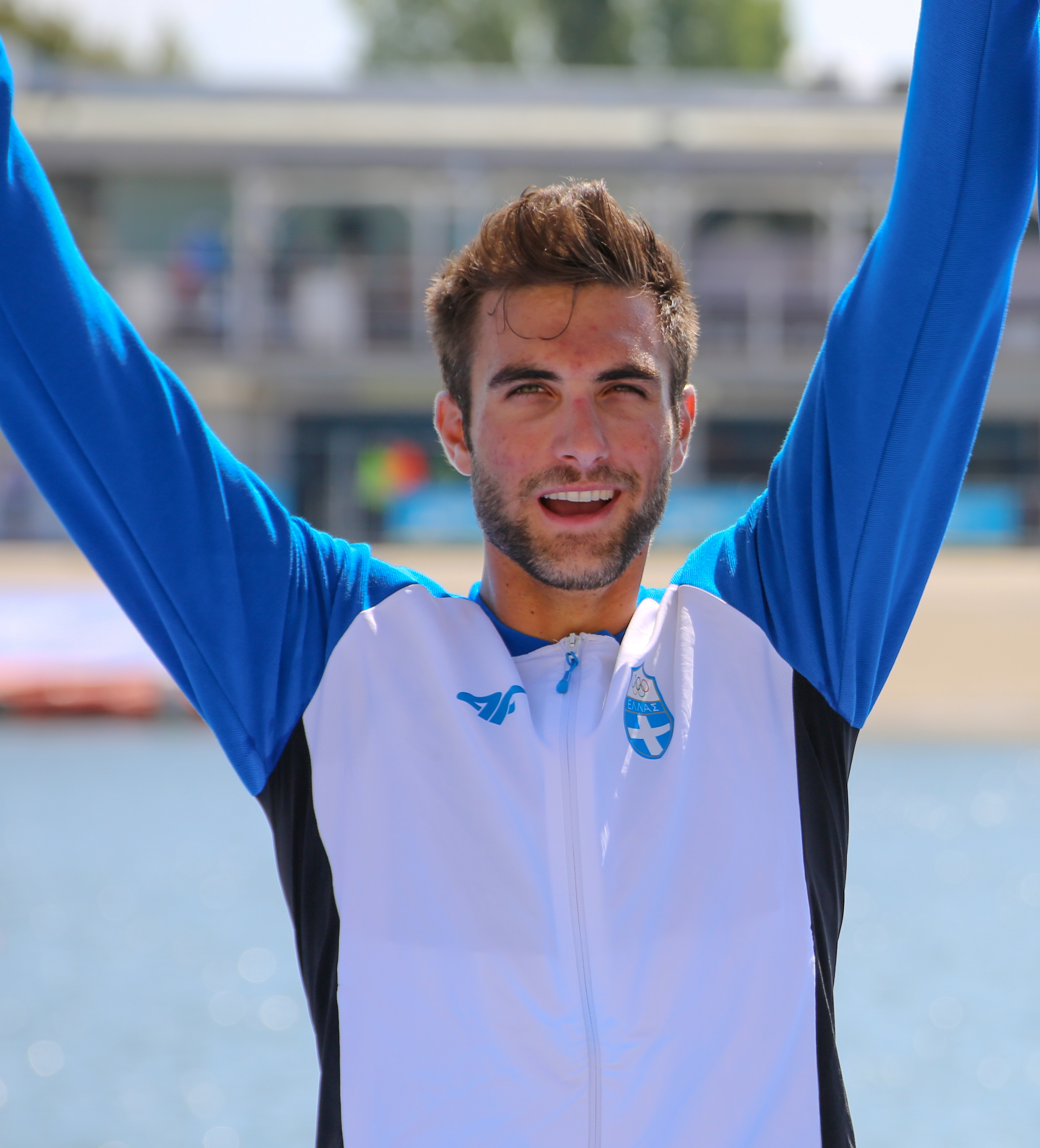
- Ntouskos in 2018

Personal information
- Nationality: Greek
- Born: 29 March 1997 (age 29) Ioannina, Greece
- Height: 186 cm (6 ft 1 in)
- Weight: 73 kg (161 lb)

Sport
- Country: Greece
- Sport: Rowing
Medal record
Men's rowing
Representing Greece
Olympic Games
Gold medal – first place	2020 Tokyo	Single sculls
World Championships
Gold medal – first place	2025 Shanghai	Single sculls
European Championships
Silver medal – second place	2022 Oberschleißheim	Single sculls
Silver medal – second place	2023 Bled	Single sculls
Silver medal – second place	2024 Szeged	Single sculls
Silver medal – second place	2025 Plovdiv	Single sculls
Bronze medal – third place	2026 Varese	Single sculls
World Rowing U23 Championships
Silver medal – second place	2016 Rotterdam	BLM2-
Silver medal – second place	2019 Sarasota	BM1X
Bronze medal – third place	2015 Plovdiv	BLM2-
European Rowing U23 Championships
Gold medal – first place	2018 Brest	BM2x
Bronze medal – third place	2019 Ioannina	BM1x
Mediterranean Games
Gold medal – first place	2018 Tarragona	Double sculls
Gold medal – first place	2026 Taranto	Single sculls
Gold medal – first place	2026 Taranto	Mix2x

Stefanos Ntouskos (Greek: Στέφανος Ντούσκος; born 29 March 1997) is a Greek competitive rower. He won a gold medal in the men's single sculls, at the 2020 Summer Olympics. Stefanos also won the gold medal in the single sculls at the 2025 World Rowing Championships in Shanghai. In the 2026 World Rowing Championships in Amsterdam, he became fourth in the single sculls B final (10th overall).

He previously competed at the 2016 Summer Olympics in Rio de Janeiro, in the men's lightweight coxless four, finishing in the sixth place.

In November 2023, the Hellenic Olympic Committee officially announced that Ntouskos would be the first torch-bearer in the relay from Olympia to Paris for the 2024 Summer Olympic Games.
