= 2019 World Rowing Championships =

International rowing event

- Venue: Ottensheim
- Location: Ottensheim, Austria
- Dates: 25 August – 1 September

The 2019 World Rowing Championships were held in Ottensheim, Austria from 25 August to 1 September 2019. Apart from Ottensheim, the right to host the championships was contested by Hamburg in Germany, Račice in the Czech Republic, and Varese in Italy.

The event determined the majority of qualifiers to the rowing competitions at the 2020 Summer Olympics and Paralympics in Tokyo, Japan.

On 21 August, three days before the championships, pararower Dzmitry Ryshkevich from Belarus died after he capsized during a training session. He was expected to participate in the PR1M1x at his third consecutive championships.

== Medal summary ==
=== Medal table ===
* Host nation (Austria)

| Rank | Nation | Gold | Silver | Bronze | Total |
|---|---|---|---|---|---|
| 1 | New Zealand | 4 | 2 | 0 | 6 |
| 2 | Italy | 3 | 4 | 3 | 10 |
| 3 | China | 3 | 1 | 0 | 4 |
| 4 | Germany | 3 | 0 | 3 | 6 |
| 5 | Netherlands | 2 | 5 | 3 | 10 |
| 6 | Australia | 2 | 3 | 3 | 8 |
| 7 | United States | 2 | 1 | 3 | 6 |
| 8 | Ireland | 2 | 1 | 1 | 4 |
| 9 | Great Britain | 2 | 0 | 4 | 6 |
| 10 | Poland | 1 | 2 | 1 | 4 |
| 11 | Russia | 1 | 2 | 0 | 3 |
| 12 | Canada | 1 | 1 | 1 | 3 |
| 13 | Norway | 1 | 0 | 1 | 2 |
| 14 | Croatia | 1 | 0 | 0 | 1 |
| 14 | Ukraine | 1 | 0 | 0 | 1 |
| 16 | Romania | 0 | 2 | 0 | 2 |
| 17 | France | 0 | 1 | 2 | 3 |
| 18 | Denmark | 0 | 1 | 1 | 2 |
| 19 | Austria | 0 | 1 | 0 | 1 |
| 19 | Hungary | 0 | 1 | 0 | 1 |
| 19 | Japan | 0 | 1 | 0 | 1 |
| 22 | Brazil | 0 | 0 | 1 | 1 |
| 22 | Israel | 0 | 0 | 1 | 1 |
| Totals (23 entries) | | 29 | 29 | 28 | 86 |

Non-Olympic/Paralympic classes

=== Men's events ===
| Event | Gold | | Silver | | Bronze | |
Openweight events
| M1x | Oliver Zeidler; Germany | 6:44.55 | Sverri Sandberg Nielsen; Denmark | 6:44.58 | Kjetil Borch; Norway | 6:44.84 |
| M2x | China; Liu Zhiyu; Zhang Liang | 6:05.68 | Ireland; Philip Doyle; Ronan Byrne | 6:06.25 | Poland; Mirosław Ziętarski; Mateusz Biskup | 6:07.87 |
| M4x | Netherlands; Dirk Uittenbogaard; Abe Wiersma; Tone Wieten; Koen Metsemakers | 5:51.75 | Poland; Dominik Czaja; Wiktor Chabel; Szymon Pośnik; Fabian Barański | 5:55.59 | Italy; Filippo Mondelli; Andrea Panizza; Luca Rambaldi; Giacomo Gentili | 5:56.11 |
| M2− | Croatia; Martin Sinković; Valent Sinković | 6:42.28 | New Zealand; Thomas Murray; Michael Brake | 6:45.47 | Australia; Sam Hardy; Joshua Hicks | 6:51.81 |
| M4− | Poland; Mateusz Wilangowski; Mikołaj Burda; Marcin Brzeziński; Michał Szpakowski | 6:09.86 | Romania; Mihăiță Țigănescu; Mugurel Semciuc; Ștefan Berariu; Cosmin Pascari | 6:11.41 | Great Britain; Matthew Rossiter; Oliver Cook; Rory Gibbs; Sholto Carnegie | 6:11.71 |
| M8+ | Germany; Johannes Weißenfeld; Laurits Follert; Christopher Reinhardt; Torben Johannesen; Jakob Schneider; Malte Jakschik; Richard Schmidt; Hannes Ocik; Martin Sauer | 5:19.41 | Netherlands; Bjorn van den Ende; Ruben Knab; Jasper Tissen; Simon van Dorp; Maarten Hurkmans; Bram Schwarz; Mechiel Versluis; Robert Lücken; Aranka Kops | 5:19.96 | Great Britain; Thomas George; James Rudkin; Josh Bugajski; Moe Sbihi; Jacob Dawson; Oliver Wynne-Griffith; Matthew Tarrant; Thomas Ford; Henry Fieldman | 5:22.35 |
Lightweight events
| LM1x | Martino Goretti; Italy | 6:59.48 | Péter Galambos; Hungary | 7:02.37 | Sean Murphy; Australia | 7:04.55 |
| LM2x | Ireland; Fintan McCarthy; Paul O'Donovan | 6:37.28 | Italy; Stefano Oppo; Pietro Ruta | 6:39.71 | Germany; Jonathan Rommelmann; Jason Osborne | 6:41.07 |
| LM4x | China; Zhang Zhiyuan; Chen Sensen; Lü Fanpu; Zeng Tao | 5:53.63 | Italy; Lorenzo Fontana; Alfonso Scalzone; Catello Amarante II; Gabriel Soares | 5:55.01 | Netherlands; Damion Eigenberg; David Kampman; Ward van Zeijl; Bart Lukkes | 5:56.06 |
| LM2− | Italy; Giuseppe Di Mare; Raffaele Serio | 6:37.75 | Russia; Nikita Bolozin; Maksim Telitsyn | 6:42.07 | Brazil; Vangelys Pereira; Emanuel Borges | 6:45.28 |
Pararowing events
| PR1M1x | Roman Polianskyi; Ukraine | 9:12.99 | Aleksey Chuvashev; Russia | 9:19.43 | Erik Horrie; Australia | 9:23.86 |
| PR2M1x | Corné de Koning; Netherlands | 8:42.78 | Jeremy Hall; Canada | 8:47.44 | Daniele Stefanoni; Italy | 9:11.55 |
| PR3M2− | Canada; Kyle Fredrickson; Andrew Todd | 7:16.42 | Australia; William Smith; Jed Altschwager | 7:17.83 | France; Jérôme Hamelin; Laurent Viala | 7:24.00 |

=== Women's events ===
| Event | Gold | | Silver | | Bronze | |
Openweight events
| W1x | Sanita Pušpure; Ireland | 7:17.14 | Emma Twigg; New Zealand | 7:20.56 | Kara Kohler; United States | 7:22.21 |
| W2x | New Zealand; Brooke Donoghue; Olivia Loe | 6:47.17 | Romania; Nicoleta Ancuța-Bodnar; Simona Radiș | 6:48.55 | Netherlands; Roos de Jong; Lisa Scheenaard | 6:49.22 |
| W4x | China; Chen Yunxia; Zhang Ling; Lü Yang; Cui Xiaotong | 6:34.65 | Poland; Agnieszka Kobus; Marta Wieliczko; Maria Springwald; Katarzyna Zillmann | 6:36.59 | Netherlands; Olivia van Rooijen; Inge Janssen; Sophie Souwer; Nicole Beukers | 6:36.62 |
| W2− | New Zealand; Grace Prendergast; Kerri Gowler | 7:21.35 | Australia; Jessica Morrison; Annabelle McIntyre | 7:23.62 | Canada; Caileigh Filmer; Hillary Janssens | 7:26.52 |
| W4− | Australia; Olympia Aldersey; Katrina Werry; Sarah Hawe; Lucy Stephan | 6:43.45 | Netherlands; Ellen Hogerwerf; Karolien Florijn; Ymkje Clevering; Veronique Meester | 6:45.55 | Denmark; Ida Jacobsen; Frida Sanggaard Nielsen; Hedvig Rasmussen; Christina Johansen | 6:47.84 |
| W8+ | New Zealand; Ella Greenslade; Emma Dyke; Lucy Spoors; Kelsey Bevan; Grace Prendergast; Kerri Gowler; Elizabeth Ross; Jackie Gowler; Caleb Shepherd | 5:56.91 | Australia; Leah Saunders; Jacinta Edmunds; Bronwyn Cox; Georgina Rowe; Rosemary Popa; Annabelle McIntyre; Jessica Morrison; Molly Goodman; James Rook | 5:59.63 | United States; Felice Mueller; Kristine O'Brien; Meghan Musnicki; Dana Moffat; Olivia Coffey; Emily Regan; Gia Doonan; Erin Reelick; Katelin Guregian | 6:01.93 |
Lightweight events
| LW1x | Marie-Louise Dräger; Germany | 7:43.98 | Chiaki Tomita; Japan | 7:47.28 | Madeleine Arlett; Great Britain | 7:49.82 |
| LW2x | New Zealand; Zoe McBride; Jackie Kiddle | 7:15.32 | Netherlands; Marieke Keijser; Ilse Paulis | 7:19.51 | Great Britain; Emily Craig; Imogen Grant | 7:21.38 |
| LW4x | Italy; Giulia Mignemi; Greta Martinelli; Silvia Crosio; Arianna Noseda | 6:34.00 | China; Cheng Mengyin; Wu Qiang; Chen Fang; Yuan Xiaoyu | 6:36.31 | Germany; Fini Sturm; Vera Spanke; Leonie Pieper; Leonie Pless | 6:37.72 |
| LW2− | United States; Margaret Bertasi; Cara Stawicki | 7:32.64 | Italy; Sofia Tanghetti; Maria Ludovica Costa | 7:34.20 | Germany; Janika Kölblin; Marie-Christine Gerhardt | 7:37.72 |
Pararowing events
| PR1W1x | Birgit Skarstein; Norway | 10:18.83 | Nathalie Benoit; France | 10:24.07 | Moran Samuel; Israel | 10:30.19 |
| PR2W1x | Kathryn Ross; Australia | 9:37.30 | Annika van der Meer; Netherlands | 9:56.84 | Katie O'Brien; Ireland | 10:01.64 |
| PR3W2− | United States; Molly Moore; Jaclyn Smith | 8:06.51 | Italy; Greta Muti; Maryam Afgei | 9:20.71 | None awarded | |

=== Mixed pararowing events ===
| Event | Gold | | Silver | | Bronze | |
|---|---|---|---|---|---|---|
| PR2Mix2x | Great Britain; Lauren Rowles; Laurence Whiteley | 8:34.95 | Netherlands; Annika van der Meer; Corne de Koning | 8:37.78 | France; Perle Bouge; Christophe Lavigne | 9:02.60 |
| PR3Mix2x | Russia; Valentina Zhagot; Evgenii Borisov | 7:48.32 | Austria; Johanna Beyer; David Erkinger | 8:01.12 | United States; Joshua Boissoneau; Pearl Outlaw | 8:17.51 |
| PR3Mix4+ | Great Britain; Ellen Buttrick; Giedrė Rakauskaitė; James Fox; Oliver Stanhope; Erin Wysocki-Jones | 7:09.54 | United States; Alexandra Reilly; Charley Nordin; John Tanguay; Danielle Hansen; Karen Petrik | 7:21.61 | Italy; Cristina Scazzosi; Alessandro Brancato; Lorenzo Bernard; Greta Muti; Lorena Fuina | 7:29.34 |

=== Event codes ===
| | Single sculls | Double sculls | Quadruple sculls | Coxless pair | Coxless four | Coxed pair | Coxed four | Eight |
| Men's | M1x | M2x | M4x | M2− | M4− | | | M8+ |
| Lightweight men's | LM1x | LM2x | LM4x | LM2− | | | | |
| PR1 men's | PR1M1x | | | | | | | |
| PR2 men's | PR2M1x | | | | | | | |
| PR3 men's | | | | PR3M2− | | | | |
| Women's | W1x | W2x | W4x | W2− | W4− | | | W8+ |
| Lightweight women's | LW1x | LW2x | LW4x | LW2− | | | | |
| PR1 women's | PR1W1x | | | | | | | |
| PR2 women's | PR2W1x | | | | | | | |
| PR3 women's | | | | PR3W2− | | | | |
| PR2 mixed | | PR2Mix2x | | | | | | |
| PR3 mixed | | PR3Mix2x | | | | | PR3Mix4+ | |

Pararowing classification — PR1: arms & shoulders, PR2: trunk & arms, PR3: legs, trunk, arms
