= Rowing at the 2020 Summer Olympics – Qualification =

This article details the qualifying phase for rowing at the 2020 Summer Olympics (postponed to 2021 due to the COVID-19 pandemic). The majority of the spots were awarded to the National Olympic Committees, not to specific athletes, at the 2019 World Rowing Championships, held in Ottensheim, Austria from 25 August to 1 September 2019. At the World Championships countries qualify boats rather than crews and can make crew changes for the Olympic regatta for qualified boats. Further berths are distributed to the nations at four continental qualifying regattas in Asia and Oceania, Africa, Latin America, and Europe. The last berths were distributed at the Final Olympic Qualification Regatta held in Lucerne, Switzerland 15–16 May 2021.

All qualifying NOCs are limited to one berth per event, and only NOCs with fewer than two berths from the World Championships may compete in the continental qualifying regattas. Host nation Japan will be automatically granted a berth each in the men's and women's single sculls, in case the nation fails to qualify for any rowing event at the various regattas.

== Timeline ==
| Event | Date | Venue |
|---|---|---|
| 2019 World Rowing Championships | 25 August – 1 September 2019 | (Austria) Ottensheim |
| African Continental Qualification Regatta | 10–12 October 2019 | (Tunisia) Tunis |
| Americas Continental Qualification Regatta | 4–5 March 2021 | (Brazil) Rio de Janeiro |
| European Continental Qualification Regatta | 5–8 April 2021 | (Italy) Varese |
| Asian & Oceania Continental Qualification Regatta | 5–7 May 2021 | (Japan) Tokyo |
| Final Qualification Regatta | 15–16 May 2021 | (Switzerland) Lucerne |

== Qualification summary ==
| Nation | Men | | | | | | | Women | | | | | | | Crews | Athletes |
| Nation | M1x | M2- | M2x | LM2x | M4- | M4x | M8+ | W1x | W2- | W2x | LW2x | W4- | W4x | W8+ | Crews | Athletes |
|---|---|---|---|---|---|---|---|---|---|---|---|---|---|---|---|---|
| Algeria | | | | Yes | | | | | | | | | | | 1 | 2 |
| Argentina | | | | | | | | | | | Yes | | | | 1 | 2 |
| Australia | | Yes | | | Yes | Yes | Yes | | Yes | Yes | | Yes | Yes | Yes | 9 | 40 |
| Austria | | | | | | | | Yes | | | Yes | | | | 2 | 3 |
| Belarus | | Yes | | | | | | Yes | | | Yes | | | | 3 | 5 |
| Belgium | | | | Yes | | | | | | | | | | | 1 | 2 |
| Benin | Yes | | | | | | | | | | | | | | 1 | 1 |
| Bermuda | Yes | | | | | | | | | | | | | | 1 | 1 |
| Brazil | Yes | | | | | | | | | | | | | | 1 | 1 |
| Canada | Yes | Yes | | Yes | Yes | | | Yes | Yes | Yes | Yes | Yes | | Yes | 10 | 29 |
| Chile | | | | Yes | | | | | | | | | | | 1 | 2 |
| China | | | Yes | | | Yes | | Yes | Yes | Yes | | Yes | Yes | Yes | 8 | 28 |
| Ivory Coast | Yes | | | | | | | | | | | | | | 1 | 1 |
| Croatia | Yes | Yes | | | | | | | | | | | | | 2 | 3 |
| Cuba | | | | | | | | Yes | | | | | | | 1 | 1 |
| Czech Republic | Yes | | Yes | Yes | | | | | | Yes | | | | | 4 | 7 |
| Denmark | Yes | Yes | | | | | | | Yes | | | Yes | | | 4 | 9 |
| Dominican Republic | Yes | | | | | | | | | | | | | | 1 | 1 |
| Egypt | Yes | | | | | | | | | | | | | | 1 | 1 |
| Estonia | | | | | | Yes | | | | | | | | | 1 | 4 |
| France | | Yes | Yes | | | | | | | Yes | Yes | | Yes | | 5 | 12 |
| Germany | Yes | | Yes | Yes | | Yes | Yes | | | Yes | | | Yes | | 7 | 24 |
| Great Britain | | | Yes | | Yes | Yes | Yes | Yes | Yes | | Yes | Yes | Yes | Yes | 10 | 41 |
| Greece | Yes | | | | | | | Yes | Yes | | | | | | 3 | 4 |
| Guatemala | | | | | | | | | | | Yes | | | | 1 | 2 |
| Hong Kong | | | | | | | | Yes | | | | | | | 1 | 1 |
| Hungary | Yes | | | | | | | | | | | | | | 1 | 1 |
| India | | | | Yes | | | | | | | | | | | 1 | 2 |
| Indonesia | | | | | | | | | | | Yes | | | | 1 | 2 |
| Iran | | | | | | | | Yes | | | | | | | 1 | 1 |
| Iraq | Yes | | | | | | | | | | | | | | 1 | 1 |
| Ireland | | | Yes | Yes | | | | Yes | Yes | | Yes | Yes | | | 6 | 13 |
| Italy | Yes | Yes | | Yes | Yes | Yes | | | Yes | Yes | Yes | | Yes | | 9 | 23 |
| Japan | Yes | | | | | | | | | | Yes | | | | 2 | 3 |
| Kazakhstan | Yes | | | | | | | | | | | | | | 1 | 1 |
| Kuwait | Yes | | | | | | | | | | | | | | 1 | 1 |
| Libya | Yes | | | | | | | | | | | | | | 1 | 1 |
| Lithuania | Yes | | Yes | | | Yes | | | | Yes | | | | | 4 | 9 |
| Mexico | | | | | | | | Yes | | | | | | | 1 | 1 |
| Monaco | Yes | | | | | | | | | | | | | | 1 | 1 |
| Morocco | | | | | | | | Yes | | | | | | | 1 | 1 |
| Namibia | | | | | | | | Yes | | | | | | | 1 | 1 |
| Netherlands | Yes | Yes | Yes | | Yes | Yes | Yes | Yes | | Yes | Yes | Yes | Yes | | 11 | 35 |
| New Zealand | Yes | Yes | Yes | | | | Yes | Yes | Yes | Yes | | | Yes | Yes | 9 | 32 |
| Nicaragua | Yes | | | | | | | Yes | | | | | | | 2 | 2 |
| Nigeria | | | | | | | | Yes | | | | | | | 1 | 1 |
| Norway | Yes | | | Yes | | Yes | | | | | | | | | 3 | 7 |
| Paraguay | | | | | | | | Yes | | | | | | | 1 | 1 |
| Peru | Yes | | | | | | | | | | | | | | 1 | 1 |
| Philippines | Yes | | | | | | | | | | | | | | 1 | 1 |
| Poland | | | Yes | Yes | Yes | Yes | | | | | | Yes | Yes | | 6 | 20 |
| Portugal | | | | Yes | | | | | | | | | | | 1 | 2 |
| Puerto Rico | | | | | | | | Yes | | | | | | | 1 | 1 |
| Qatar | | | | | | | | Yes | | | | | | | 1 | 1 |
| Romania | | Yes | Yes | | Yes | | Yes | | Yes | Yes | Yes | Yes | | Yes | 9 | 36 |
| ROC | Yes | | Yes | | | | | Yes | Yes | Yes | Yes | | | | 6 | 10 |
| Saudi Arabia | Yes | | | | | | | | | | | | | | 1 | 1 |
| Serbia | | Yes | | | | | | Yes | | | | | | | 2 | 3 |
| Singapore | | | | | | | | Yes | | | | | | | 1 | 1 |
| South Africa | | Yes | | | Yes | | | | | | | | | | 2 | 6 |
| South Korea | | | | | | | | Yes | | | | | | | 1 | 1 |
| Spain | | Yes | | Yes | | | | | Yes | | | | | | 3 | 6 |
| Sudan | | | | | | | | Yes | | | | | | | 1 | 1 |
| Sweden | | | | | | | | Yes | | | | | | | 1 | 1 |
| Switzerland | | | Yes | | Yes | | | Yes | | | Yes | | | | 4 | 9 |
| Chinese Taipei | | | | | | | | Yes | | | | | | | 1 | 1 |
| Thailand | | | | Yes | | | | | | | | | | | 1 | 2 |
| Togo | | | | | | | | Yes | | | | | | | 1 | 1 |
| Trinidad and Tobago | | | | | | | | Yes | | | | | | | 1 | 1 |
| Tunisia | | | | | | | | | | | Yes | | | | 1 | 2 |
| Turkey | Yes | | | | | | | | | | | | | | 1 | 1 |
| Uganda | | | | | | | | Yes | | | | | | | 1 | 1 |
| Ukraine | | | | Yes | | | | | | | | | | | 1 | 2 |
| United States | | | | | Yes | | Yes | Yes | Yes | Yes | Yes | Yes | Yes | Yes | 9 | 37 |
| Uruguay | | | | Yes | | | | | | | | | | | 1 | 2 |
| Uzbekistan | | | | Yes | | | | | | | | | | | 1 | 2 |
| Vanuatu | Yes | | | | | | | | | | | | | | 1 | 1 |
| Venezuela | | | | Yes | | | | | | | | | | | 1 | 2 |
| Vietnam | | | | | | | | | | | Yes | | | | 1 | 2 |
| Zimbabwe | Yes | | | | | | | | | | | | | | 1 | 1 |
| Total: 80 NOCs | 32 | 13 | 13 | 20 | 10 | 10 | 7 | 32 | 13 | 13 | 18 | 10 | 10 | 7 | 208 | 526 |

== Men's events ==
=== Men's single sculls ===
| Event | # | Nation | Nominated rower |
|---|---|---|---|
| Host nation (if required) | 0 | — | |
| 2019 World Rowing Championships | 1 | Germany | Oliver Zeidler |
| 2019 World Rowing Championships | 2 | Denmark | Sverri Sandberg Nielsen |
| 2019 World Rowing Championships | 3 | Netherlands | Finn Florijn |
| 2019 World Rowing Championships | 4 | Czech Republic | Jan Fleissner |
| 2019 World Rowing Championships | 5 | Lithuania | Mindaugas Griškonis |
| 2019 World Rowing Championships | 6 | Norway | Kjetil Borch |
| 2019 World Rowing Championships | 7 | New Zealand | Jordan Parry |
| 2019 World Rowing Championships | 8 | Croatia | Damir Martin |
| 2019 World Rowing Championships | 9 | Italy | Gennaro Di Mauro |
| Asian & Oceania Qualification Regatta | 1 | Japan | Ryuta Arakawa |
| Asian & Oceania Qualification Regatta | 2 | Kazakhstan | Vladislav Yakovlev |
| Asian & Oceania Qualification Regatta | 3 | Philippines | Cris Nievarez |
| Asian & Oceania Qualification Regatta | 4 | Iraq | Mohammed Al-Khafaji |
| Asian & Oceania Qualification Regatta | 5 | Kuwait | Abdulrahman Al-Fadhel |
| Asian & Oceania Qualification Regatta | 6 (Note: Reallocated host quota) | Saudi Arabia | Husein Alireza |
| African Qualification Regatta | 1 | Egypt | Abdelkhalek El-Banna |
| African Qualification Regatta | 2 | Zimbabwe | Peter Purcell-Gilpin |
| African Qualification Regatta | 3 | Benin | Privel Hinkati |
| African Qualification Regatta | 4 | Ivory Coast | Franck N'Dri |
| African Qualification Regatta | 5 | Libya | Alhussein Ghambour |
| Americas Qualification Regatta | 1 | Brazil | Lucas Verthein |
| Americas Qualification Regatta | 2 | Peru | Álvaro Torres |
| Americas Qualification Regatta | 3 | Bermuda | Dara Alizadeh |
| Americas Qualification Regatta | 4 | Nicaragua | Félix Potoy |
| Americas Qualification Regatta | 5 | Dominican Republic | Ignacio Vásquez |
| European Qualification Regatta | 1 | Greece | Stefanos Ntouskos |
| European Qualification Regatta | 2 | Hungary | Bendegúz Pétervári-Molnár |
| European Qualification Regatta | 3 | Turkey | Onat Kazaklı |
| Final Qualification Regatta | 1 | ROC | Aleksandr Vyazovkin |
| Final Qualification Regatta | 2 | Canada | Trevor Jones |
| Tripartite Invitation | 1 | Monaco | Quentin Antognelli |
| Tripartite Invitation | 2 | Vanuatu | Rio Rii |
| Total | Up to 32 | | |

=== Men's double sculls ===
| Event | # | Nation | Nominated rowers |
|---|---|---|---|
| 2019 World Rowing Championships | 1 | China | Liu Zhiyu; Zhang Liang |
| 2019 World Rowing Championships | 2 | Ireland | Philip Doyle; Ronan Byrne |
| 2019 World Rowing Championships | 3 | Poland | Mirosław Ziętarski; Mateusz Biskup |
| 2019 World Rowing Championships | 4 | Romania | Ioan Prundeanu; Marian Enache |
| 2019 World Rowing Championships | 5 | Switzerland | Roman Röösli; Barnabé Delarze |
| 2019 World Rowing Championships | 6 | Great Britain | John Collins; Graeme Thomas |
| 2019 World Rowing Championships | 7 | Netherlands | Melvin Twellaar; Stef Broenink |
| 2019 World Rowing Championships | 8 | New Zealand | Chris Harris; Jack Lopas |
| 2019 World Rowing Championships | 9 | France | Matthieu Androdias; Hugo Boucheron |
| 2019 World Rowing Championships | 10 | Germany | Stephan Krüger; Marc Weber |
| 2019 World Rowing Championships | 11 | Lithuania | Saulius Ritter; Aurimas Adomavičius |
| Final Qualification Regatta | 1 | ROC | Ilya Kondratyev; Andrey Potapkin |
| Final Qualification Regatta | 2 | Czech Republic | Jakub Podrazil; Jan Cincibuch |
| Total | 13 | | |

=== Men's lightweight double sculls ===
| Event | # | Nation | Nominated rowers |
|---|---|---|---|
| 2019 World Rowing Championships | 1 | Italy | Stefano Oppo; Pietro Ruta |
| 2019 World Rowing Championships | 2 | Spain | Manel Balastegui; Caetano Horta |
| 2019 World Rowing Championships | 3 | Poland | Jerzy Kowalski; Artur Mikołajczewski |
| 2019 World Rowing Championships | 4 | Ireland | Paul O'Donovan; Fintan McCarthy |
| 2019 World Rowing Championships | 5 | Germany | Jason Osborne; Jonathan Rommelmann |
| 2019 World Rowing Championships | 6 | Norway | Kristoffer Brun; Are Strandli |
| 2019 World Rowing Championships | 7 | Belgium | Tim Brys; Niels Van Zandweghe |
| Asian & Oceania Qualification Regatta | 1 | India | Arjun Lal; Arvind Singh |
| Asian & Oceania Qualification Regatta | 2 | Uzbekistan | Shakhboz Kholmurzaev; Sobirjon Safaroliyev |
| Asian & Oceania Qualification Regatta | 3 | Thailand | Siwakorn Wongpin; Nawamin Deenoi |
| African Qualification Regatta | 1 | Algeria | Sid Ali Boudina; Kamel Ait Daoud |
| Americas Qualification Regatta | 1 | Uruguay | Bruno Cetraro; Felipe Klüver |
| Americas Qualification Regatta | 2 | Chile | Eber Sanhueza; César Abaroa |
| Americas Qualification Regatta | 3 | Venezuela | César Amaris; José Güipe |
| European Qualification Regatta | 1 | Ukraine | Stanislav Kovalov; Ihor Khmara |
| European Qualification Regatta | 2 | Portugal | Pedro Fraga; Afonso Costa |
| Final Qualification Regatta | 1 | Canada | Patrick Keane; Maxwell Lattimer |
| Final Qualification Regatta | 2 | Czech Republic | Miroslav Vraštil Jr. Jiří Šimánek |
| Total | 18 | | |

=== Men's quadruple sculls ===
| Event | # | Nation | Nominated rowers |
|---|---|---|---|
| 2019 World Rowing Championships | 1 | Netherlands | Abe Wiersma; Dirk Uittenbogaard; Koen Metsemakers; Tone Wieten |
| 2019 World Rowing Championships | 2 | Poland | Fabian Barański; Szymon Pośnik; Wiktor Chabel; Dominik Czaja |
| 2019 World Rowing Championships | 3 | Italy | Simone Venier; Andrea Panizza; Luca Rambaldi; Giacomo Gentili |
| 2019 World Rowing Championships | 4 | Australia | Jack Cleary; Caleb Antill; Cameron Girdlestone; Luke Letcher |
| 2019 World Rowing Championships | 5 | Germany | Max Appel; Hans Gruhne; Tim Ole Naske; Karl Schulze |
| 2019 World Rowing Championships | 6 | China | Yi Xudi; Zang Ha; Liu Dang; Zhang Quan |
| 2019 World Rowing Championships | 7 | Norway | Martin Helseth; Olaf Tufte; Oscar Stabe Helvig; Erik Solbakken |
| 2019 World Rowing Championships | 8 | Great Britain | Harry Leask; Angus Groom; Tom Barras; Jack Beaumont |
| Final Qualification Regatta | 1 | Estonia | Kaspar Taimsoo; Tõnu Endrekson; Allar Raja; Jüri-Mikk Udam |
| Final Qualification Regatta | — | ~~ROC~~ | ~~Artyom Kosov~~; ~~Nikita Eskin~~; ~~Nikolay Pimenov~~; ~~Alexander Matveev~~ |
| Final Qualification Regatta | 2 | Lithuania | Dominykas Jančionis; Dovydas Nemeravičius; Armandas Kelmelis; Martynas Džiaugys |
| Total | 10 | | |

=== Men's coxless pair ===
| Event | # | Nation | Nominated rowers |
|---|---|---|---|
| 2019 World Rowing Championships | 1 | Croatia | Martin Sinković; Valent Sinković |
| 2019 World Rowing Championships | 2 | Italy | Giovanni Abagnale; Marco Di Costanzo |
| 2019 World Rowing Championships | 3 | Spain | Jaime Canalejo; Javier García |
| 2019 World Rowing Championships | 4 | New Zealand | Stephen Jones; Brook Robertson |
| 2019 World Rowing Championships | 5 | Australia | Sam Hardy; Joshua Hicks |
| 2019 World Rowing Championships | 6 | France | Guillaume Turlan; Thibaud Turlan |
| 2019 World Rowing Championships | 7 | Serbia | Martin Mačković; Miloš Vasić |
| 2019 World Rowing Championships | 8 | Canada | Kai Langerfeld; Conlin McCabe |
| 2019 World Rowing Championships | 9 | South Africa | Luc Daffarn; Jake Green |
| 2019 World Rowing Championships | 10 | Romania | Marius Cozmiuc; Ciprian Tudosă |
| 2019 World Rowing Championships | 11 | Belarus | Dzmitry Furman; Siarhei Valadzko |
| Final Qualification Regatta | 1 | Denmark | Joachim Sutton; Frederik Vystavel |
| Final Qualification Regatta | 2 | Netherlands | Guillaume Krommenhoek; Niki van Sprang |
| Total | 13 | | |

=== Men's coxless four ===
| Event | # | Nation | Nominated rowers |
|---|---|---|---|
| 2019 World Rowing Championships | 1 | Poland | Mikołaj Burda; Mateusz Wilangowski; Marcin Brzeziński; Michał Szpakowski |
| 2019 World Rowing Championships | 2 | Romania | Mihăiță Țigănescu; Mugurel Semciuc; Ștefan Berariu; Cosmin Pascari |
| 2019 World Rowing Championships | 3 | Great Britain | Oliver Cook; Matthew Rossiter; Rory Gibbs; Sholto Carnegie |
| 2019 World Rowing Championships | 4 | Italy | Matteo Castaldo; Bruno Rosetti; Matteo Lodo; Giuseppe Vicino |
| 2019 World Rowing Championships | 5 | United States | Anders Weiss; Clark Dean; Michael Grady; Andrew Reed |
| 2019 World Rowing Championships | 6 | Australia | Alexander Purnell; Spencer Turrin; Jack Hargreaves; Alexander Hill |
| 2019 World Rowing Championships | 7 | Netherlands | Boudewijn Röell; Jan van der Bij; Nelson Ritsema; Sander de Graaf |
| 2019 World Rowing Championships | 8 | Switzerland | Paul Jaquot; Markus Kessler; Andrin Gulich; Joel Schürch |
| Final Qualification Regatta | 1 | South Africa | Lawrence Brittain; Kyle Schoonbee; John Smith; Sandro Torrente |
| Final Qualification Regatta | 2 | Canada | Jakub Buczek; Luke Gadsdon; Gavin Stone; Will Crothers |
| Total | 10 | | |

=== Men's eight ===
| Event | # | Nation | Nominated rowers |
|---|---|---|---|
| 2019 World Rowing Championships | 1 | Germany | Laurits Follert; Malte Jakschik; Torben Johannesen; Hannes Ocik; Olaf Roggensack; Martin Sauer; Richard Schmidt; Jakob Schneider; Johannes Weißenfeld |
| 2019 World Rowing Championships | 2 | Netherlands | Bjorn van den Ende; Bram Schwarz; Jasper Tissen; Maarten Hurkmans; Mechiel Versluis; Robert Lücken; Ruben Knab; Simon van Dorp; Eline Berger |
| 2019 World Rowing Championships | 3 | Great Britain | Josh Bugajski; Jacob Dawson; Thomas George; Moe Sbihi; Charles Elwes; Oliver Wynne-Griffith; James Rudkin; Thomas Ford; Henry Fieldman |
| 2019 World Rowing Championships | 4 | Australia | Nicholas Lavery; Angus Widdicombe; Angus Dawson; Simon Keenan; Nicholas Purnell; Timothy Masters; Joshua Booth; Jack O'Brien; Stuart Sim |
| 2019 World Rowing Championships | 5 | United States | Austin Hack; Justin Best; Liam Corrigan; Ben Davison; Conor Harrity; Nick Mead; Alex Miklasevich; Alexander Richards; Julian Venonsky |
| Final Qualification Regatta | 1 | New Zealand | Dan Williamson; Matt Macdonald; Tom Mackintosh; Phillip Wilson; Shaun Kirkham; Hamish Bond; Michael Brake; Tom Murray; Sam Bosworth |
| Final Qualification Regatta | 2 | Romania | Alexandru Chioseaua; Florin Lehaci; Constantin Radu; Sergiu Bejan; Vlad Dragoș Aicoboae; Constantin Adam; Florin Arteni; Ciprian Huc; Adrian Munteanu(cox) |
| Total | 7 | | |

== Women's events ==
=== Women's single sculls ===
| Event | # | Nation | Nominated rower |
|---|---|---|---|
| Host nation (if required) | 0 | — | |
| 2019 World Rowing Championships | 1 | United States | Kara Kohler |
| 2019 World Rowing Championships | 2 | Great Britain | Victoria Thornley |
| 2019 World Rowing Championships | 3 | Switzerland | Jeannine Gmelin |
| 2019 World Rowing Championships | 4 | Ireland | Sanita Pušpure |
| 2019 World Rowing Championships | 5 | New Zealand | Emma Twigg |
| 2019 World Rowing Championships | 6 | Canada | Carling Zeeman |
| 2019 World Rowing Championships | 7 | China | Jiang Yan |
| 2019 World Rowing Championships | 8 | Netherlands | Sophie Souwer |
| 2019 World Rowing Championships | 9 | Austria | Magdalena Lobnig |
| Asian & Oceania Qualification Regatta | 1 | Iran | Nazanin Malaei |
| Asian & Oceania Qualification Regatta | 2 | Chinese Taipei | Huang Yi-ting |
| Asian & Oceania Qualification Regatta | 3 | South Korea | Jeong Hye-jeong |
| Asian & Oceania Qualification Regatta | 4 | Hong Kong | Winnie Hung |
| Asian & Oceania Qualification Regatta | 5 | Qatar | Tala Abujbara |
| Asian & Oceania Qualification Regatta | 6 | Singapore | Joan Poh |
| African Qualification Regatta | 1 | Namibia | Maike Diekmann |
| African Qualification Regatta | 2 | Morocco | Sarah Fraincart |
| African Qualification Regatta | 3 | Uganda | Kathleen Grace Noble |
| African Qualification Regatta | 4 | Togo | Claire Akossiwa |
| African Qualification Regatta | 5 | Nigeria | Esther Toko |
| Americas Qualification Regatta | 1 | Mexico | Kenia Lechuga |
| Americas Qualification Regatta | 2 | Paraguay | Alejandra Alonso |
| Americas Qualification Regatta | 3 | Trinidad and Tobago | Felice Chow |
| Americas Qualification Regatta | 4 | Cuba | Milena Venega |
| Americas Qualification Regatta | 5 | Puerto Rico | Veronica Toro |
| European Qualification Regatta | 1 | ROC | Hanna Prakatsen |
| European Qualification Regatta | 2 | Serbia | Jovana Arsić |
| European Qualification Regatta | 3 | Sweden | Lovisa Claesson |
| Final Qualification Regatta | 1 | Greece | Anneta Kyridou |
| Final Qualification Regatta | 2 | Belarus | Tatsiana Klimovich |
| Tripartite Invitation | 1 | Sudan | Esraa Khogali |
| Tripartite Invitation | 2 | Nicaragua | Evidelia González Jarquin |
| Total | Up to 32 | | |

=== Women's double sculls ===
| Event | # | Nation | Nominated rowers |
|---|---|---|---|
| 2019 World Rowing Championships | 1 | New Zealand | Brooke Donoghue; Hannah Osborne |
| 2019 World Rowing Championships | 2 | Romania | Simona Radiș; Nicoleta-Ancuţa Bodnar |
| 2019 World Rowing Championships | 3 | Netherlands | Lisa Scheenaard; Roos de Jong |
| 2019 World Rowing Championships | 4 | Canada | Gabrielle Smith; Andrea Proske |
| 2019 World Rowing Championships | 5 | United States | Genevra Stone; Kristina Wagner |
| 2019 World Rowing Championships | 6 | France | Hélène Lefebvre; Élodie Ravera-Scaramozzino |
| 2019 World Rowing Championships | 7 | Italy | Alessandra Patelli; Chiara Ondoli |
| 2019 World Rowing Championships | 8 | Czech Republic | Lenka Antošová; Kristýna Fleissnerová |
| 2019 World Rowing Championships | 9 | Lithuania | Donata Karalienė; Milda Valčiukaitė |
| 2019 World Rowing Championships | 10 | China | Shen Shuangmei; Liu Xiaoxin |
| 2019 World Rowing Championships | 11 | Australia | Amanda Bateman; Tara Rigney |
| Final Qualification Regatta | 1 | ROC | Ekaterina Pitirimova; Ekaterina Kurochkina |
| Final Qualification Regatta | 2 | Germany | Leonie Menzel; Annekatrin Thiele |
| Total | 13 | | |

=== Women's lightweight double sculls ===
| Event | # | Nation | Nominated rowers |
|---|---|---|---|
| 2019 World Rowing Championships | 1 | Netherlands | Ilse Paulis; Marieke Keijser |
| 2019 World Rowing Championships | 2 | Great Britain | Emily Craig; Imogen Grant |
| 2019 World Rowing Championships | 3 | Romania | Ionela-Livia Cozmiuc; Gianina-Elena Beleagă |
| 2019 World Rowing Championships | — | ~~New Zealand~~ | |
| 2019 World Rowing Championships | 4 | Belarus | Ina Nikulina; Alena Furman |
| 2019 World Rowing Championships | 5 | France | Claire Bové; Laura Tarantola |
| 2019 World Rowing Championships | 6 | Italy | Valentina Rodini; Federica Cesarini |
| 2019 World Rowing Championships | 7 | Canada | Jill Moffatt; Jennifer Casson |
| Asian & Oceania Qualification Regatta | 1 | Japan | Chiaki Tomita; Ayami Oishi |
| Asian & Oceania Qualification Regatta | 2 | Vietnam | Lường Thị Thảo; Đinh Thị Hảo |
| Asian & Oceania Qualification Regatta | 3 | Indonesia | Mutiara Rahma Putri; Melani Putri |
| African Qualification Regatta | 1 | Tunisia | Nour El-Houda Ettaieb; Khadija Krimi |
| Americas Qualification Regatta | 1 | Argentina | Milka Kraljev; Evelyn Silvestro |
| Americas Qualification Regatta | 2 | Guatemala | Yulissa López; Jenniffer Zúñiga |
| Americas Qualification Regatta | — | | |
| European Qualification Regatta | 1 | ROC | Anastasia Lebedeva; Maria Botalova |
| European Qualification Regatta | 2 | Austria | Louisa Altenhuber; Valentina Cavallar |
| Final Qualification Regatta | 1 | United States | Michelle Sechser; Molly Reckford |
| Final Qualification Regatta | 2 | Switzerland | Frédérique Rol; Patricia Merz |
| Final Qualification Regatta | 3 | Ireland | Aoife Casey; Margaret Cremen |
| Total | 18 | | |

=== Women's quadruple sculls ===
| Event | # | Nation | Nominated rowers |
|---|---|---|---|
| 2019 World Rowing Championships | 1 | Netherlands | Inge Janssen; Laila Youssifou; Nicole Beukers; Olivia van Rooijen |
| 2019 World Rowing Championships | 2 | China | Chen Yunxia; Zhang Ling; Lü Yang; Cui Xiaotong |
| 2019 World Rowing Championships | 3 | Poland | Agnieszka Kobus-Zawojska; Marta Wieliczko; Katarzyna Zillmann; Maria Sajdak |
| 2019 World Rowing Championships | 4 | Germany | Frieda Hämmerling; Franziska Kampmann; Carlotta Nwajide; Daniela Schultze |
| 2019 World Rowing Championships | 5 | Great Britain | Mathilda Hodgkins-Byrne; Hannah Scott; Charlotte Hodgkins-Byrne; Lucy Glover |
| 2019 World Rowing Championships | 6 | New Zealand | Olivia Loe; Eve Macfarlane; Ruby Tew; Georgia Nugent-O'Leary |
| 2019 World Rowing Championships | 7 | United States | Meghan O'Leary; Ellen Tomek; Cicely Madden; Alie Rusher |
| 2019 World Rowing Championships | 8 | Italy | Valentina Iseppi; Alessandra Montesan; Veronica Lisi; Stefania Gobbi |
| Final Qualification Regatta | 1 | Australia | Caitlin Cronin; Harriet Hudson; Rowena Meredith; Ria Thompson |
| Final Qualification Regatta | 2 | France | Emma Lunatti; Marie Jacquet; Margaux Bailleul; Violaine Aernoudts |
| Total | 10 | | |

=== Women's coxless pair ===
| Event | # | Nation | Nominated rowers |
|---|---|---|---|
| 2019 World Rowing Championships | 1 | New Zealand | Kerri Gowler; Grace Prendergast |
| 2019 World Rowing Championships | 2 | Australia | Annabelle McIntyre; Jessica Morrison |
| 2019 World Rowing Championships | 3 | Canada | Caileigh Filmer; Hillary Janssens |
| 2019 World Rowing Championships | 4 | United States | Megan Kalmoe; Tracy Eisser |
| 2019 World Rowing Championships | 5 | Spain | Aina Cid; Virginia Díaz |
| 2019 World Rowing Championships | 6 | Italy | Kiri Tontodonati; Aisha Rocek |
| 2019 World Rowing Championships | 7 | Romania | Adriana Ailincăi; Iuliana Buhuș |
| 2019 World Rowing Championships | 8 | Ireland | Aileen Crowley; Monika Dukarska |
| 2019 World Rowing Championships | 9 | China | Huang Kaifeng; Liu Jinchao |
| 2019 World Rowing Championships | 10 | Great Britain | Helen Glover; Polly Swann |
| 2019 World Rowing Championships | 11 | Greece | Christina Bourmpou; Maria Kyridou |
| Final Qualification Regatta | 1 | ROC | Vasilisa Stepanova; Elena Oriabinskaia |
| Final Qualification Regatta | 2 | Denmark | Fie Udby Erichsen; Hedvig Rasmussen |
| Total | 13 | | |

=== Women's coxless four ===
| Event | # | Nation | Nominated rowers |
|---|---|---|---|
| 2019 World Rowing Championships | 1 | Australia | Annabelle McIntyre; Jessica Morrison; Rosemary Popa; Lucy Stephan |
| 2019 World Rowing Championships | 2 | Netherlands | Ellen Hogerwerf; Karolien Florijn; Veronique Meester; Ymkje Clevering |
| 2019 World Rowing Championships | 3 | Denmark | Ida Gørtz Jacobsen; Christina Juhl Johansen; Frida Sanggaard Nielsen; Trine Dahl Pedersen |
| 2019 World Rowing Championships | 4 | Poland | Maria Wierzbowska; Olga Michałkiewicz; Joanna Dittmann; Monika Chabel |
| 2019 World Rowing Championships | 5 | Romania | Mădălina Hegheş; Elena Logofătu; Cristina Georgiana Popescu; Roxana Anghel |
| 2019 World Rowing Championships | 6 | United States | Grace Luczak; Kendall Chase; Claire Collins; Madeleine Wanamaker |
| 2019 World Rowing Championships | 7 | Great Britain | Rowan McKellar; Harriet Taylor; Karen Bennett; Rebecca Shorten |
| 2019 World Rowing Championships | 8 | Canada | Stephanie Grauer; Nicole Hare; Jennifer Martins; Kristina Walker |
| Final Qualification Regatta | 1 | Ireland | Aifric Keogh; Eimear Lambe; Fiona Murtagh; Emily Hegarty |
| Final Qualification Regatta | 2 | China | Qin Miaomiao; Wang Fei; Lin Xinyu; Lu Shiyu |
| Total | 10 | | |

=== Women's eight ===
| Event | # | Nation | Nominated rowers |
|---|---|---|---|
| 2019 World Rowing Championships | 1 | New Zealand | Kelsey Bevan; Emma Dyke; Kirstyn Goodger; Jackie Gowler; Ella Greenslade; Beth Ross; Lucy Spoors; Phoebe Spoors; Caleb Shepherd (cox) |
| 2019 World Rowing Championships | 2 | Australia | Olympia Aldersey; Molly Goodman; Sarah Hawe; Genevieve Horton; Bronwyn Cox; Giorgia Patten; Georgina Rowe; Katrina Werry; James Rook |
| 2019 World Rowing Championships | 3 | United States | Katelin Guregian; Meghan Musnicki; Charlotte Buck; Olivia Coffey; Gia Doonan; Brooke Mooney; Kristine O'Brien; Regina Salmons; Jessica Thoennes |
| 2019 World Rowing Championships | 4 | Canada | Susanne Grainger; Kasia Gruchalla-Wesierski; Madison Mailey; Sydney Payne; Andrea Proske; Lisa Roman; Christine Roper; Avalon Wasteneys; Kristen Kit |
| 2019 World Rowing Championships | 5 | Great Britain | Fiona Gammond; Sara Parfett; Rebecca Edwards; Chloe Brew; Katherine Douglas; Caragh McMurtry; Rebecca Muzerie; Emily Ford; Matilda Horn |
| Final Qualification Regatta | 1 | China | Wang Zifeng; Wang Yuwei; Xu Fei; Miao Tian; Zhang Min; Ju Rui; Li Jingjing; Guo Linlin |
| Final Qualification Regatta | 2 | Romania | Maria-Magdalena Rusu; Viviana-Iuliana Bejinariu; Georgiana Dedu; Maria Tivodariu; Ioana Vrînceanu; Amalia Beres; Mădălina Bereș; Denisa Tîlvescu; Daniela Druncea (cox) |
| Total | 7 | | |
