= Rowing at the 2020 Summer Olympics – Women's coxless four =

Olympic rowing event

Women's coxless four at the Games of the XXXII Olympiad
- Olympic rowing
- Venue: Sea Forest Waterway
- Dates: 24–28 July 2021
- Competitors: 40 from 10 nations
- Winning time: 6:15.37

Medalists
| 1st place, gold medalist(s) | | Lucy Stephan; Rosemary Popa; Jessica Morrison; Annabelle McIntyre | Australia |
| 2nd place, silver medalist(s) | | Ellen Hogerwerf; Karolien Florijn; Ymkje Clevering; Veronique Meester | Netherlands |
| 3rd place, bronze medalist(s) | | Aifric Keogh; Eimear Lambe; Fiona Murtagh; Emily Hegarty | Ireland |

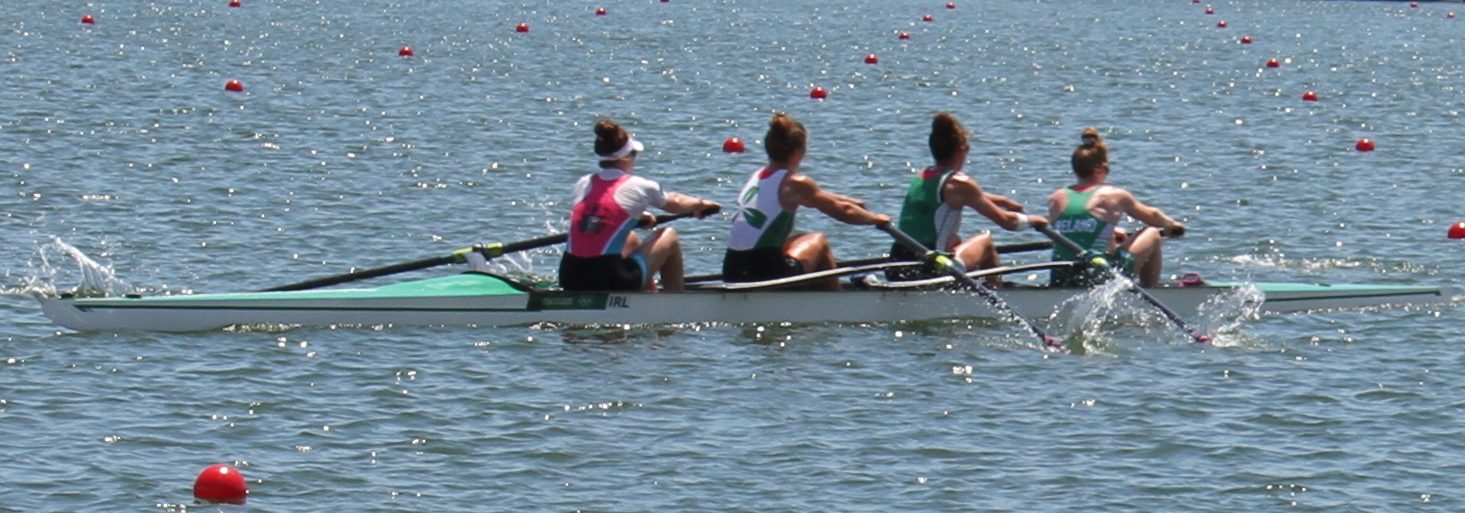
Bronze medalists: Ireland during a training at the 2020 Summer Olympics

The women's coxless four event at the 2020 Summer Olympics took place from 24 to 28 July 2021 at the Sea Forest Waterway. 40 rowers from 10 nations competed.

== Background ==
This was the 2nd appearance of the women's coxless four, with the event last previously held at the 1992 Summer Olympics.

The reigning Olympic medalists in the event were Canada, the United States, and Germany. Canada and the United States qualified for the event, whereas Germany did not qualify.

The reigning 2019 World Championship medalists were Australia, the Netherlands, and Denmark.

== Qualification ==
Each National Olympic Committee (NOC) has been limited to a single boat in the event since 1912. There are 10 qualifying places in the women's coxless four:

- 8 from the 2019 World Championship
- 2 from the final qualification regatta

== Competition format ==
During the first round two heats were held. The first two boats in each heat advanced to final A, while all others were relegated to the repechage.

The repechage is a round which offers rowers a second chance to qualify for Final A. The top two boats in the repechage moved on to the semifinals, with the remaining boats being sent to Final B.

There were two finals. Final A determined the medalists and the places through 6th. Final B determines places seven through ten.

== Schedule ==
The competition was held over five days.

All times are Japan Standard Time (UTC+9)

| Date | Time | Round |
|---|---|---|
| Saturday, 24 July 2021 | 11:20 | Heats |
| Sunday, 25 July 2021 | 13:00 | Repechage |
| Wednesday, 28 July 2021 | 8:30 | Final B |
| Wednesday, 28 July 2021 | 9:50 | Final A |

== Rowers per team ==
| Number | Rowers | Nation |
|---|---|---|
| 1 | Lucy Stephan - Rosemary Popa - Jessica Morrison - Annabelle McIntyre | Australia |
| 2 | Jennifer Martins - Kristina Walker - Nicole Hare - Stephanie Grauer | Canada |
| 3 | Lin Xinyu - Wang Fei - Qin Miaomiao - Lu Shiyu | China |
| 4 | Trine Dahl Pedersen - Christina Johansen - Frida Sanggaard Nielsen - Ida Jacobsen | Denmark |
| 5 | Rowan McKellar - Harriet Taylor - Karen Bennett - Rebecca Shorten | Great Britain |
| 6 | Aifric Keogh - Eimear Lambe - Fiona Murtagh - Emily Hegarty | Ireland |
| 7 | Ellen Hogerwerf - Karolien Florijn - Ymkje Clevering - Veronique Meester | Netherlands |
| 8 | Maria Wierzbowska - Olga Michałkiewicz - Monika Chabel - Joanna Dittmann | Poland |
| 9 | Madalina Heghes - Elena Logofatu - Cristina Popescu - Roxana Anghel | Romania |
| 10 | Madeleine Wanamaker - Claire Collins - Kendall Chase - Grace Luczak | United States |

== Results ==
=== Heats ===
The first two of each heat qualified for the final, while the remainder went to the repechage.

==== Heat 1 ====
| Rank | Lane | Nation | Time | Notes |
|---|---|---|---|---|
| 1 | 4 | Netherlands | 6:33.47 | Q |
| 2 | 3 | China | 6:38.54 | Q |
| 3 | 1 | Canada | 6:40.07 | R |
| 4 | 2 | Great Britain | 6:41.02 | R |
| 5 | 5 | Poland | 6:48.33 | R |

==== Heat 2 ====
| Rank | Lane | Nation | Time | Notes |
|---|---|---|---|---|
| 1 | 1 | Australia | 6:28.76 | Q |
| 2 | 2 | Ireland | 6:28.99 | Q |
| 3 | 3 | Romania | 6:40.02 | R |
| 4 | 5 | United States | 6:43.80 | R |
| 5 | 4 | Denmark | 6:50.15 | R |

=== Repechage ===
The first two in repechage heat qualify for Final A and rest go to Final B.

| Rank | Lane | Nation | Time | Notes |
|---|---|---|---|---|
| 1 | 5 | Great Britain | 6:46.20 | Q |
| 2 | 6 | Poland | 6:46.57 | Q |
| 3 | 2 | Romania | 6:47.38 | FB |
| 4 | 1 | Canada | 6:51.71 | FB |
| 5 | 3 | United States | 6:53.26 | FB |
| 6 | 4 | Denmark | 7:01.17 | FB |

=== Final ===
==== Final A ====
| Rank | Lane | Nation | Time | Notes |
|---|---|---|---|---|
| 1st place, gold medalist(s) | 3 | Australia | 6:15.37 | OB |
| 2nd place, silver medalist(s) | 4 | Netherlands | 6:15.71 | |
| 3rd place, bronze medalist(s) | 2 | Ireland | 6:20.46 | |
| 4 | 1 | Great Britain | 6:21.52 | |
| 5 | 5 | China | 6:25.13 | |
| 6 | 6 | Poland | 6:29.95 | |

==== Final B ====
| Rank | Lane | Nation | Time | Notes |
|---|---|---|---|---|
| 7 | 1 | United States | 6:33.65 | |
| 8 | 4 | Denmark | 6:34.72 | |
| 9 | 2 | Romania | 6:35.12 | |
| 10 | 3 | Canada | 6:35.13 | |
