= 2019 World Rowing Championships – Women's coxless four =

Women's coxless four at the 2019 World Rowing Championships
- Venue: Linz-Ottensheim
- Location: Ottensheim, Austria
- Dates: 25–31 August
- Competitors: 64 from 16 nations
- Winning time: 6:43.45

Medalists
gold medal	Olympia Aldersey; Katrina Werry; Sarah Hawe; Lucy Stephan	Australia
silver medal	Ellen Hogerwerf; Karolien Florijn; Ymkje Clevering; Veronique Meester	Netherlands
bronze medal	Ida Jacobsen; Frida Sanggaard Nielsen; Hedvig Rasmussen; Christina Johansen	Denmark

The women's coxless four competition at the 2019 World Rowing Championships took place at the Linz-Ottensheim regatta venue. A top-eight finish ensured qualification for the Tokyo Olympics.

== Schedule ==
The schedule was as follows:

Date	Time	Round
Sunday 25 August 2019	12:16	Heats
Tuesday 27 August 2019	10:28	Repechages
Thursday 29 August 2019	12:22	Semifinals A/B
Saturday 31 August 2019	10:30	Final C
Saturday 31 August 2019	12:12	Final B
Saturday 31 August 2019	14:58	Final A

All times are Central European Summer Time (UTC+2)

== Results ==
=== Heats ===
The two fastest boats in each heat advanced directly to the A/B semifinals. The remaining boats were sent to the repechages.

==== Heat 1 ====
Rank	Rowers	Country	Time	Notes
1	Olympia Aldersey; Katrina Werry; Sarah Hawe; Lucy Stephan	Australia	6:38.44	SA/B
2	Molly Bruggeman; Victoria Opitz; Madeleine Wanamaker; Caryn Davies	United States	6:42.83	SA/B
3	Tara Hanlon; Eimear Lambe; Aifric Keogh; Emily Hegarty	Ireland	6:44.72	R
4	Diana Serebrianska; Natalia Kovalova; Kateryna Dudchenko; Nataliya Dovhodko	Ukraine	6:53.25	R
5	Marcela Milošević; Ivana Jurković; Josipa Jurković; Bruna Milinović	Croatia	6:57.45	R
6	Isabelle Hübener; Juliane Faralisch; Ida Kruse; Alexandra Höffgen	Germany	6:59.07	R

==== Heat 2 ====
Rank	Rowers	Country	Time	Notes
1	Ellen Hogerwerf; Karolien Florijn; Ymkje Clevering; Veronique Meester	Netherlands	6:39.35	SA/B
2	Ida Jacobsen; Frida Sanggaard Nielsen; Hedvig Rasmussen; Christina Johansen	Denmark	6:42.82	SA/B
3	Sara Parfett; Emily Ford; Polly Swann; Holly Hill	Great Britain	6:45.44	R
4	Alessandra Montesano; Valentina Iseppi; Alessandra Patelli; Sara Bertolasi	Italy	6:49.85	R
5	Davina Waddy; Kelsi Walters; Eve Macfarlane; Phoebe Spoors	New Zealand	6:51.97	R

==== Heat 3 ====
Rank	Rowers	Country	Time	Notes
1	Viviana-Iuliana Bejinariu; Ioana Vrînceanu; Mădălina Bereș; Denisa Tîlvescu	Romania	6:45.48	SA/B
2	Joanna Dittmann; Olga Michałkiewicz; Monika Chabel; Maria Wierzbowska	Poland	6:45.89	SA/B
3	Wang Zifeng; Xu Xingye; Zhang Min; Wang Fei	China	6:47.33	R
4	Madison Mailey; Sydney Payne; Jennifer Martins; Stephanie Grauer	Canada	6:53.07	R
5	Kira Yuvchenko; Elizaveta Kornienko; Anna Aksenova; Valentina Plaksina	Russia	6:57.78	R

=== Repechages ===
The three fastest boats in each repechage advanced to the A/B semifinals. The remaining boats were sent to the C final.

==== Repechage 1 ====
Rank	Rowers	Country	Time	Notes
1	Wang Zifeng; Xu Xingye; Zhang Min; Wang Fei	China	6:33.49	SA/B
2	Tara Hanlon; Eimear Lambe; Aifric Keogh; Emily Hegarty	Ireland	6:35.14	SA/B
3	Alessandra Montesano; Valentina Iseppi; Alessandra Patelli; Sara Bertolasi	Italy	6:37.20	SA/B
4	Kira Yuvchenko; Elizaveta Kornienko; Anna Aksenova; Valentina Plaksina	Russia	6:41.13	FC
5	Isabelle Hübener; Juliane Faralisch; Ida Kruse; Alexandra Höffgen	Germany	6:51.75	FC

==== Repechage 2 ====
Rank	Rowers	Country	Time	Notes
1	Davina Waddy; Kelsi Walters; Eve Macfarlane; Phoebe Spoors	New Zealand	6:34.78	SA/B
2	Sara Parfett; Emily Ford; Polly Swann; Holly Hill	Great Britain	6:35.72	SA/B
3	Madison Mailey; Sydney Payne; Jennifer Martins; Stephanie Grauer	Canada	6:37.63	SA/B
4	Diana Serebrianska; Natalia Kovalova; Kateryna Dudchenko; Nataliya Dovhodko	Ukraine	6:41.94	FC
5	Marcela Milošević; Ivana Jurković; Josipa Jurković; Bruna Milinović	Croatia	6:42.20	FC

=== Semifinals ===
The three fastest boats in each semi advanced to the A final. The remaining boats were sent to the B final.

==== Semifinal 1 ====
Rank	Rowers	Country	Time	Notes
1	Olympia Aldersey; Katrina Werry; Sarah Hawe; Lucy Stephan	Australia	6:25.34	FA
2	Ida Jacobsen; Frida Sanggaard Nielsen; Hedvig Rasmussen; Christina Johansen	Denmark	6:28.58	FA
3	Ioana Vrînceanu; Viviana-Iuliana Bejinariu; Mădălina Bereș; Denisa Tîlvescu	Romania	6:30.96	FA
4	Tara Hanlon; Eimear Lambe; Aifric Keogh; Emily Hegarty	Ireland	6:32.37	FB
5	Davina Waddy; Kelsi Walters; Eve Macfarlane; Phoebe Spoors	New Zealand	6:34.48	FB
6	Alessandra Montesano; Valentina Iseppi; Alessandra Patelli; Sara Bertolasi	Italy	6:39.72	FB

==== Semifinal 2 ====
Rank	Rowers	Country	Time	Notes
1	Ellen Hogerwerf; Karolien Florijn; Ymkje Clevering; Veronique Meester	Netherlands	6:22.78	FA
2	Joanna Dittmann; Olga Michałkiewicz; Monika Chabel; Maria Wierzbowska	Poland	6:25.22	FA
3	Molly Bruggeman; Victoria Opitz; Madeleine Wanamaker; Caryn Davies	United States	6:25.80	FA
4	Wang Zifeng; Xu Xingye; Zhang Min; Wang Fei	China	6:27.60	FB
5	Sara Parfett; Emily Ford; Polly Swann; Holly Hill	Great Britain	6:28.13	FB
6	Madison Mailey; Sydney Payne; Jennifer Martins; Stephanie Grauer	Canada	6:32.36	FB

=== Finals ===
The A final determined the rankings for places 1 to 6. Additional rankings were determined in the other finals.

==== Final C ====
Rank	Rowers	Country	Time
1	Kira Yuvchenko; Elizaveta Kornienko; Anna Aksenova; Valentina Plaksina	Russia	6:45.11
2	Marcela Milošević; Ivana Jurković; Josipa Jurković; Bruna Milinović	Croatia	6:45.54
3	Diana Serebrianska; Natalia Kovalova; Kateryna Dudchenko; Nataliya Dovhodko	Ukraine	6:49.96
4	Isabelle Hübener; Juliane Faralisch; Alexandra Höffgen; Ida Kruse	Germany	6:56.07

==== Final B ====
Rank	Rowers	Country	Time
1	Sara Parfett; Emily Ford; Polly Swann; Holly Hill	Great Britain	6:55.03
2	Madison Mailey; Sydney Payne; Jennifer Martins; Stephanie Grauer	Canada	6:56.99
3	Wang Zifeng; Xu Xingye; Zhang Min; Wang Fei	China	7:02.28
4	Tara Hanlon; Eimear Lambe; Aifric Keogh; Emily Hegarty	Ireland	7:02.71
5	Davina Waddy; Kelsi Walters; Eve Macfarlane; Phoebe Spoors	New Zealand	7:04.64
6	Alessandra Montesano; Valentina Iseppi; Alessandra Patelli; Sara Bertolasi	Italy	7:06.51

==== Final A ====
Rank	Rowers	Country	Time
1st place, gold medalist(s)	Olympia Aldersey; Katrina Werry; Sarah Hawe; Lucy Stephan	Australia	6:43.45
2nd place, silver medalist(s)	Ellen Hogerwerf; Karolien Florijn; Ymkje Clevering; Veronique Meester	Netherlands	6:45.55
3rd place, bronze medalist(s)	Ida Jacobsen; Frida Sanggaard Nielsen; Hedvig Rasmussen; Christina Johansen	Denmark	6:47.84
4	Joanna Dittmann; Olga Michałkiewicz; Monika Chabel; Maria Wierzbowska	Poland	6:51.43
5	Ioana Vrînceanu; Viviana-Iuliana Bejinariu; Mădălina Bereș; Denisa Tîlvescu	Romania	6:53.83
6	Molly Bruggeman; Victoria Opitz; Madeleine Wanamaker; Caryn Davies	United States	6:55.98
