= Ireland at the 2020 Summer Olympics =

- IOC code: IRL
- NOC: Olympic Federation of Ireland
- Website: olympics.ie

in Tokyo, Japan 23 July 2021 – 8 August 2021
- Competitors: 116 in 19 sports
- Flag bearers (opening): Kellie Harrington; Brendan Irvine
- Flag bearer (closing): Natalya Coyle
- Medals Ranked 39th: Gold 2 Silver 0 Bronze 2 Total 4

Summer Olympics appearances (overview)
- 1924; 1928; 1932; 1936; 1948; 1952; 1956; 1960; 1964; 1968; 1972; 1976; 1980; 1984; 1988; 1992; 1996; 2000; 2004; 2008; 2012; 2016; 2020; 2024

Other related appearances
- Great Britain (1896–1920)

The team of the Olympic Federation of Ireland, which competed at the 2020 Summer Olympics in Tokyo, represented athletes from both the Republic of Ireland and those from Northern Ireland who choose it instead of the Great Britain and Northern Ireland team. Originally scheduled to take place from 24 July to 9 August 2020, the Games were postponed to 23 July to 8 August 2021, due to the COVID-19 pandemic. It was the team's twenty-second appearance at the Summer Olympics, having attended every edition since 1924 (before then the whole of Ireland was represented by the Great Britain and Ireland team) except the 1936 Summer Olympics in Germany.

Team Ireland sent its largest-ever Olympic squad of 116 athletes to the Summer Games in Tokyo.

== Medalists ==
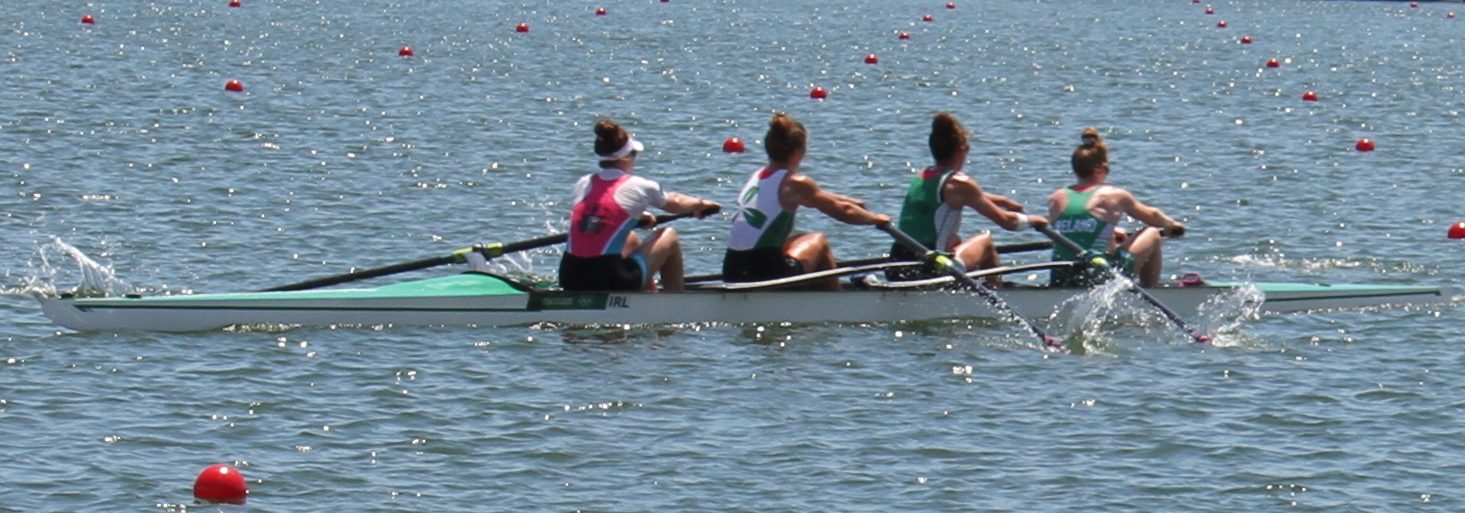
Bronze medalists in rowing

Medal	Name	Sport	Event	Date
Gold	Paul O'Donovan; Fintan McCarthy	Rowing	Men's lightweight double sculls	29 July
Gold	Kellie Harrington	Boxing	Women's lightweight	8 August
Bronze	Aifric Keogh; Eimear Lambe; Fiona Murtagh; Emily Hegarty	Rowing	Women's coxless four	28 July
Bronze	Aidan Walsh	Boxing	Men's welterweight	1 August

Medals by sport
Sport	1st place, gold medalist(s)	2nd place, silver medalist(s)	3rd place, bronze medalist(s)	Total
Boxing	1	0	1	2
Rowing	1	0	1	2
Total	2	0	2	4

Medals by gender
Gender	1st place, gold medalist(s)	2nd place, silver medalist(s)	3rd place, bronze medalist(s)	Total
Male	1	0	1	2
Female	1	0	1	2
Total	2	0	2	4

== Competitors ==
The following is the list of number of competitors in the Games. Note that reserves in field hockey are not counted:

Sport	Men	Women	Total
Athletics	13	12	25
Badminton	1	0	1
Boxing	4	3	7
Canoeing	1	0	1
Cycling	5	2	7
Diving	1	1	2
Equestrian	5	2	7
Field hockey	0	16	16
Golf	2	2	4
Gymnastics	1	1	2
Judo	1	1	2
Modern pentathlon	0	1	1
Rowing	4	9	13
Rugby sevens	12	0	12
Sailing	2	1	3
Shooting	1	0	1
Swimming	6	3	9
Taekwondo	1	0	1
Triathlon	1	1	2
Total	61	55	116

== Athletics ==
Irish athletes further achieved the entry standards, either by qualifying time or by world ranking, in the following track and field events (up to a maximum of 3 athletes in each event).

Key

- Note–Ranks given for track events are within the athlete's heat only
- Q = Qualified for the next round
- q = Qualified for the next round as a fastest loser or, in field events, by position without achieving the qualifying target
- NR = National record
- N/A = Round not applicable for the event
- Bye = Athlete not required to compete in round
- DNF = Did not finish

Track & road events
Men

Athlete	Event	Heat		Semifinal		Final	
Athlete	Event	Time	Rank	Time	Rank	Time	Rank
Marcus Lawler	200 m	20.73	6	Did not advance			
Leon Reid	200 m	20.53	5 q	20.54	7	Did not advance	
Mark English	800 m	1:46.75	4	Did not advance			
Andrew Coscoran	1500 m	3:37.11	8 q	3:35.84	10	Did not advance	
Thomas Barr	400 m hurdles	49.02	2 Q	48.26	4	Did not advance	
David Kenny	20 km walk	—N/a				1:26:54	29
Paul Pollock	Marathon	—N/a				2:27:48	71
Stephen Scullion	Marathon	—N/a				DNF	
Kevin Seaward	Marathon	—N/a				2:21:45	58
Brendan Boyce	50 km walk	—N/a				3:53:40	10
Alex Wright	50 km walk	—N/a				4:06:20	29

Women

Athlete	Event	Heat		Semifinal		Final	
Athlete	Event	Time	Rank	Time	Rank	Time	Rank
Phil Healy	200 m	23.21	5	Did not advance			
Phil Healy	400 m	51.98	4	Did not advance			
Síofra Cléirigh Büttner	800 m	2:04.62	7	Did not advance			
Nadia Power	800 m	2:03.74	7	Did not advance			
Louise Shanahan	800 m	2:03.57	7	Did not advance			
Sarah Healy	1500 m	4:09.78	11	Did not advance			
Ciara Mageean	1500 m	4:07.29	10	Did not advance			
Sarah Lavin	100 m hurdles	13.16	7	Did not advance			
Michelle Finn	3000 m steeplechase	9:36.26	9	—N/a		Did not advance	
Eilish Flanagan	3000 m steeplechase	9:34.86	12	—N/a		Did not advance	
Aoife Cooke	Marathon	—N/a				DNF	
Fionnuala McCormack	Marathon	—N/a				2:34:09	25

Mixed

Athlete	Event	Heat		Final	
Athlete	Event	Result	Rank	Result	Rank
Sophie Becker; Cillín Greene; Phil Healy; Chris O'Donnell	4 × 400 m relay	3:12.88 NR	4 Q	3:15.04	8

== Badminton ==
Ireland entered one badminton player into the Olympic tournament. Vietnamese-born Nhat Nguyen was selected to compete in the men's singles based on the BWF World Race to Tokyo Rankings.

Athlete	Event	Group Stage			Elimination	Quarterfinal	Semifinal	Final / BM	
Athlete	Event	Opposition Score	Opposition Score	Rank	Opposition Score	Opposition Score	Opposition Score	Opposition Score	Rank
Nhat Nguyen	Men's singles	Karunaratne (SRI); W (21–16, 21–14)	Wang T-w (TPE); L (12–21, 21–18, 12–21)	2	Did not advance				

== Boxing ==
Ireland entered seven boxers (four men and three women) to compete in the following weight classes into the Olympic tournament. Six of them, including Rio 2016 Olympian Brendan Irvine (men's flyweight), secured the spots on the Irish squad in their respective weight divisions, either by winning the round of 16 match, advancing to the semifinal match, or scoring a box-off triumph, at the 2020 European Qualification Tournament in London and Paris. Kurt Walker completed the nation's boxing lineup by topping the list of eligible boxers from Europe in the men's featherweight division of the IOC's Boxing Task Force Rankings.

Men

Athlete	Event	Round of 32	Round of 16	Quarterfinals	Semifinals	Final	
Athlete	Event	Opposition Result	Opposition Result	Opposition Result	Opposition Result	Opposition Result	Rank
Brendan Irvine	Flyweight	Paalam (PHI); L 1–4	Did not advance				
Kurt Walker	Featherweight	Quiles (ESP); W 5–0	Mirzakhalilov (UZB); W 4–1	Ragan (USA); L 2–3	Did not advance		
Aidan Walsh	Welterweight	Bye	Mengue (CMR); W 5–0	Clair (MRI); W 4–1	McCormack (GBR); L WO	Did not advance	3rd place, bronze medalist(s)
Emmett Brennan	Light heavyweight	Ruzmetov (UZB); L 0–5	Did not advance				

Women

Athlete	Event	Round of 32	Round of 16	Quarterfinals	Semifinals	Final	
Athlete	Event	Opposition Result	Opposition Result	Opposition Result	Opposition Result	Opposition Result	Rank
Kellie Harrington	Lightweight	Bye	Nicoli (ITA); W 5–0	Khelif (ALG); W 5–0	Seesondee (THA); W 3–2	Ferreira (BRA); W 5–0	1st place, gold medalist(s)
Michaela Walsh	Featherweight	Bye	Testa (ITA); L 1–4	Did not advance			
Aoife O'Rourke	Middleweight	—N/a	Li Q (CHN); L 0–5	Did not advance			

== Canoeing ==
=== Slalom ===
Ireland qualified one canoeist for the men's C-1 class by finishing in the top eleven at the 2019 ICF Canoe Slalom World Championships in La Seu d'Urgell, Spain.

Athlete	Event	Preliminary						Semifinal		Final	
Athlete	Event	Run 1	Rank	Run 2	Rank	Best	Rank	Time	Rank	Time	Rank
Liam Jegou	Men's C-1	174.57	18	104.40	9	104.40	11 Q	208.39	15	Did not advance	

== Cycling ==
=== Road ===
Ireland entered three riders to compete in the men's Olympic road race, by virtue of their top 50 national finish (for men) in the UCI World Ranking.

Athlete	Event	Time	Rank
Eddie Dunbar	Men's road race	6:21:46	76
Dan Martin	Men's road race	6:09:04	16
Nicolas Roche	Men's road race	6:21:46	75
Nicolas Roche	Men's time trial	1:01:23.13	28

=== Track ===
Following the completion of the 2020 UCI Track Cycling World Championships, Irish riders accumulated spots for both men and women in the omnium and madison, based on their country's results in the final UCI Olympic rankings.

Omnium

Athlete	Event	Scratch race		Tempo race		Elimination race		Points race		Total	
Athlete	Event	Rank	Points	Rank	Points	Rank	Points	Rank	Points	Points	Rank
Mark Downey	Men's omnium	16	10	19	4	19	4	9	0	18	17
Emily Kay	Women's omnium	13	16	13	16	9	24	15	0	56	13

Madison

Athlete	Event	Points	Laps	Rank
Mark Downey; Felix English	Men's madison	DNF	–40	=12
Emily Kay; Shannon McCurley	Women's madison	DNF	–40	=13

== Diving ==
Ireland entered two divers into the Olympic competition after finishing in the top 12 each of the men's springboard and women's platform, respectively, at the 2021 FINA Diving World Cup in Tokyo, Japan.

Athlete	Event	Preliminary		Semifinal		Final	
Athlete	Event	Points	Rank	Points	Rank	Points	Rank
Oliver Dingley	Men's 3 m springboard	335.00	25	Did not advance			
Tanya Watson	Women's 10 m platform	289.40	16 Q	278.15	15	Did not advance	

== Equestrian ==
Irish equestrians qualified a full squad in both the team dressage and eventing competitions; the former by securing the second of three available berths for Group A and B at the European Championships in Rotterdam, Netherlands, and the latter by finishing among the top six nations at the 2018 FEI World Equestrian Games in Tryon, North Carolina, United States. A team of jumping riders was added to the Irish equestrian squad by winning the gold medal at the FEI Nations Cup Final in Barcelona, Spain. Tokyo 2020 would have been the first time that Ireland participated in an Olympic team dressage competition.

The Irish eventing and jumping squads were named on 21 June 2021. The dressage squad was withdrawn following a series of individual withdrawals due to a horse retirement, veterinary and medical reasons. An individual dressage place had been sought and was eventually offered in favor of Heike Holstein. James Connor and Dane Rawlins have appealed the decision to withdraw the dressage team.

=== Dressage ===
Athlete	Horse	Event	Grand Prix		Grand Prix Freestyle		Overall	
Athlete	Horse	Event	Score	Rank	Technical	Artistic	Score	Rank
Heike Holstein	Sambuca	Individual	68.432	37	Did not advance			

Qualification Legend: Q = Qualified for the final; q = Qualified for the final as a lucky loser

=== Eventing ===
Austin O'Connor and Colorado Blue had been named as reserves, but replaced Cathal Daniels and Rioghan Rua shortly before the competition commenced.

Athlete	Horse	Event	Dressage		Cross-country			Jumping						Total	
Athlete	Horse	Event	Dressage		Cross-country			Qualifier			Final			Total	
Athlete	Horse	Event	Penalties	Rank	Penalties	Total	Rank	Penalties	Total	Rank	Penalties	Total	Rank	Penalties	Rank
Sarah Ennis	Woodcourt Garrison	Individual	38.10	50	37.60	75.70	41	4.00	79.70	36	Did not advance			79.70	36
Austin O'Connor	Colorado Blue	Individual	38.00	49	0.00	38.00	20	4.00	42.00	18 Q	4.00	46.00	13	46.00	13
Sam Watson	Flamenco	Individual	34.30	38	13.00	47.30	31	8.00	55.30	30	Did not advance			55.30	30
Sarah Ennis; Austin O'Connor; Sam Watson	See above	Team	110.40	13	50.60	161.00	8	16.00	177.00	8	—N/a			177.00	8

=== Jumping ===
Shane Sweetnam and Alejandro were named the travelling alternates and replaced Cian O'Connor and Kilkenny before the team event.

Athlete	Horse	Event	Qualification		Final		
Athlete	Horse	Event	Penalties	Rank	Penalties	Time	Rank
Bertram Allen	Pacino Amiro	Individual	0	=1 Q	8	84.64	15
Darragh Kenny	Cartello	Individual	0	=1 Q	8	85.11	17
Cian O'Connor	Kilkenny	Individual	0	=1 Q	1	88.45	7
Bertram Allen; Darragh Kenny; Shane Sweetnam	Alejandro; Pacino Amiro; Cartello	Team	Eliminated		did not advance		

== Field hockey ==
Summary

Key:

- FT – After full time.
- P – Match decided by penalty-shootout.

Team	Event	Group Stage						Quarterfinal	Semifinal	Final / BM	
Team	Event	Opposition Score	Opposition Score	Opposition Score	Opposition Score	Opposition Score	Rank	Opposition Score	Opposition Score	Opposition Score	Rank
Ireland women's	Women's tournament	South Africa; W 2–0	Netherlands; L 0–4	Germany; L 2–4	India; L 0–1	Great Britain; L 0–2	5	Did not advance			

=== Women's tournament ===
Ireland women's national field hockey team qualified for the Olympics by securing one of the seven team berths available from the 2019 Women's FIH Olympic Qualifiers, defeating Canada 4–3 in a penalty shoot-out, having drawn 0–0 on aggregate over a two-match playoff in Dublin. This will be the first time Ireland compete in women's field hockey at the Olympics.

Team roster

The squad was announced on 21 June 2021.

Head coach: (Australia) Sean Dancer

No.	Pos.	Player	Date of birth (age)	Caps	Goals	Club
1	GK	Ayeisha McFerran	10 January 1996 (aged 25)	105	{{{goals}}}	(Netherlands) Kampong
2	MF	Chloe Watkins	7 March 1992 (aged 29)	229	{{{goals}}}	(Republic of Ireland) Monkstown
3	DF	Hannah Matthews	24 March 1991 (aged 30)	152	{{{goals}}}	(Republic of Ireland) Loreto
4	FW	Sarah Torrans	14 February 1999 (aged 22)	26	{{{goals}}}	(Republic of Ireland) Loreto
5	MF	Nicola Daly	3 April 1988 (aged 33)	196	{{{goals}}}	(Republic of Ireland) Loreto
6	DF	Róisín Upton	1 April 1994 (aged 27)	81	{{{goals}}}	(Republic of Ireland) Catholic Institute
7	DF	Hannah McLoughlin	2 December 1999 (aged 21)	19	{{{goals}}}	(Republic of Ireland) UCD
8	FW	Deirdre Duke	9 June 1992 (aged 29)	146	{{{goals}}}	(Republic of Ireland) Old Alex
9	FW	Kathryn Mullan (Captain)	7 April 1994 (aged 27)	198	{{{goals}}}	(Republic of Ireland) Ballymoney
10	DF	Shirley McCay	7 June 1988 (aged 33)	311	{{{goals}}}	(Republic of Ireland) Pegasus
11	MF	Sarah Hawkshaw	4 November 1995 (aged 25)	38	{{{goals}}}	(Republic of Ireland) Railway Union
12	DF	Elena Tice	16 November 1997 (aged 23)	114	{{{goals}}}	(Republic of Ireland) Old Alex
13	FW	Naomi Carroll	13 September 1992 (aged 28)	115	{{{goals}}}	(Republic of Ireland) Catholic Institute
14	MF	Elizabeth Holden	4 January 1990 (aged 31)	201	{{{goals}}}	(Republic of Ireland) Belfast Harlequins
15	DF	Sarah McAuley	25 September 2001 (aged 19)	1	{{{goals}}}	(Republic of Ireland) Muckross
16	FW	Anna O'Flanagan	18 February 1990 (aged 31)	212	{{{goals}}}	(Republic of Ireland) Muckross
17	MF	Michelle Carey	5 May 1999 (aged 22)	5	{{{goals}}}	(Republic of Ireland) UCD
18	FW	Zara Malseed	11 June 1997 (aged 24)	2	{{{goals}}}	(Republic of Ireland) Ards

Group play

Pos	Team	Pld	W	D	L	GF	GA	GD	Pts	Qualification
1	Netherlands	5	5	0	0	18	2	+16	15	Quarterfinals
2	Germany	5	4	0	1	13	7	+6	12	Quarterfinals
3	Great Britain	5	3	0	2	11	5	+6	9	Quarterfinals
4	India	5	2	0	3	7	14	−7	6	Quarterfinals
5	Ireland	5	1	0	4	4	11	−7	3	
6	South Africa	5	0	0	5	5	19	−14	0	

Source: Tokyo 2020 and FIH
Rules for classification: 1) points; 2) matches won; 3) goal difference; 4) goals for; 5) head-to-head result; 6) field goals scored.

24 July 2021
21:15
v

Ireland	2–0	South Africa
Upton 9'; Torrans 45'	Report

South Pitch
Umpires:
Kelly Hudson (NZL)
Emi Yamada (JPN)

26 July 2021
10:00
v

Netherlands	4–0	Ireland
Albers 8'; Pheninckx 49'; Leurink 50'; Matla 56'	Report

South Pitch
Umpires:
Michelle Meister (GER)
Liu Xiaoying (CHN)

28 July 2021
12:15
v

Germany	4–2	Ireland
Altenburg 10', 40'; Pieper 20'; Hauke 55'	Report	Tice 42'; McLoughlin 51'

South Pitch
Umpires:
Michelle Joubert (RSA)
Sarah Wilson (GBR)

30 July 2021
11:45
v

Ireland	0–1	India
	Report	Navneet 57'

North Pitch
Umpires:
Aleisha Neumann (AUS)
Annelize Rostron (RSA)

31 July 2021
20:45
v

Ireland	0–2	Great Britain
	Report	Townsend 17'; Martin 32'

North Pitch
Umpires:
Carolina de la Fuente (ARG)
Emi Yamada (JPN)

== Golf ==
Ireland entered two male and two female golfers into the Olympic tournament. Rory McIlroy (world no. 10) and Shane Lowry (world no. 42) qualified directly among the top 60 eligible players for the men's event based on the IGF World Rankings of 20 June 2021.

Athlete	Event	Round 1	Round 2	Round 3	Round 4	Total		
Athlete	Event	Score	Score	Score	Score	Score	Par	Rank
Shane Lowry	Men's	70	65	68	70	274	−10	=22
Rory McIlroy	Men's	69	66	67	67	269	−15	=4
Leona Maguire	Women's	71	67	70	71	279	−5	=23
Stephanie Meadow	Women's	72	66	68	66	272	−12	7

== Gymnastics ==
=== Artistic ===
Ireland entered one male and one female artistic gymnast into the Olympic competition. Rhys McClenaghan secured one of the two spots available for individual based gymnasts, neither part of the team nor qualified through the all-around, at the 2019 World Championships in Stuttgart, Germany. Megan Ryan received a re-allocated spot from the 2019 World Championships after North Korea withdrew from the Olympic Games.

Men

Athlete	Event	Qualification								Final							
Athlete	Event	Apparatus						Total	Rank	Apparatus						Total	Rank
Athlete	Event	F	PH	R	V	PB	HB	Total	Rank	F	PH	R	V	PB	HB	Total	Rank
Rhys McClenaghan	Pommel horse	—N/a	15.266	—N/a				15.266	=2 Q	—N/a	13.100	—N/a				13.100	7

Women

Athlete	Event	Qualification						Final					
Athlete	Event	Apparatus				Total	Rank	Apparatus				Total	Rank
Athlete	Event	F	UB	BB	V	Total	Rank	F	UB	BB	V	Total	Rank
Megan Ryan	All-around	13.200	11.533	10.466	12.000	47.199	72	Did not advance					

== Judo ==
Ireland entered two judoka (one man and one woman) into the Olympic tournament based on the International Judo Federation Olympics Individual Ranking.

Athlete	Event	Round of 32	Round of 16	Quarterfinals	Semifinals	Repechage	Final / BM	
Athlete	Event	Opposition Result	Opposition Result	Opposition Result	Opposition Result	Opposition Result	Opposition Result	Rank
Benjamin Fletcher	Men's –100 kg	Khurramov (UZB); L 00–01	did not advance					
Megan Fletcher	Women's –70 kg	Polleres (AUT); L 00–01	did not advance					

== Modern pentathlon ==
Two-time Olympian Natalya Coyle secured her selection in the women's event with an eighth-place finish and fourth among those eligible for Olympic qualification at the 2019 European Championships in Bath, England.

Athlete	Event	Fencing (épée one touch)				Swimming (200 m freestyle)			Riding (show jumping)			Combined: shooting/running (10 m air pistol)/(3200 m)			Total points	Final rank
Athlete	Event	RR	BR	Rank	MP points	Time	Rank	MP points	Penalties	Rank	MP points	Time	Rank	MP Points	Total points	Final rank
Natalya Coyle	Women's	23–12	1	3	239	2:13.88	13	283	66	28	234	13:08:51	28	512	1268	24

== Rowing ==
Ireland qualified five boats into the Olympic regatta, with the majority of crews confirming Olympic places for their boats at the 2019 FISA World Championships in Ottensheim, Austria and at the 2021 FISA Final Qualification Regatta in Lucerne, Switzerland.

A place in the women's lightweight double sculls boat was awarded to the Irish rowing team after their third-place finish at the FISA Final Qualification Regatta, having received a vacant place from the 2021 Pan American Qualification Regatta in Rio de Janeiro, Brazil.

The crew in the women's four, Aifric Keogh, Eimear Lambe, Fiona Murtagh and Emily Hegarty, won a bronze medal, Ireland's first medal of the 2020 Games and the nation's second ever rowing medal. In the men's lightweight double sculls, Paul O'Donovan and Fintan McCarthy won Ireland's first ever Olympic gold medal in rowing, which was also the nations's first Olympic gold by male athletes since boxer Michael Carruth in 1992.

Men

Athlete	Event	Heats		Repechage		Semifinals		Final	
Athlete	Event	Time	Rank	Time	Rank	Time	Rank	Time	Rank
Ronan Byrne; Philip Doyle	Double sculls	6:14.40	4 R	6:29.90	3 Q	6:49.06	6 FB	6:16.89	10
Fintan McCarthy; Paul O'Donovan	Lightweight double sculls	6:23.74	1 SA/B	—N/a		6:05.33 WR	1 FA	6:06.43	1st place, gold medalist(s)

Women

Athlete	Event	Heats		Repechage		Quarterfinals		Semifinals		Final	
Athlete	Event	Time	Rank	Time	Rank	Time	Rank	Time	Rank	Time	Rank
Sanita Pušpure	Single sculls	7:46.08	1 QF	Bye		7:58.30	1 SA/B	7:34.40	5 FB	DNS	12
Aoife Casey; Margaret Cremen	Lightweight double sculls	7:17.67	5 R	7:23.46	3 SA/B	—N/a		6:49.24	5 FB	6:49.90	8
Aileen Crowley; Monika Dukarska	Pair	7:23.71	4 R	7:31.00	3 SA/B	—N/a		7:06.07	5 FB	7:02.22	11
Aifric Keogh; Eimear Lambe; Fiona Murtagh; Emily Hegarty	Four	6:28.94	2 FA	Bye		—N/a				6:20.48	3rd place, bronze medalist(s)

Qualification Legend: FA=Final A (medal); FB=Final B (non-medal); FC=Final C (non-medal); FD=Final D (non-medal); FE=Final E (non-medal); FF=Final F (non-medal); SA/B=Semifinals A/B; SC/D=Semifinals C/D; SE/F=Semifinals E/F; QF=Quarterfinals; R=Repechage

== Rugby sevens ==
Summary

Team	Event	Pool Stage				Quarterfinal	Semifinal/Pl.	Final/Pl.	
Team	Event	Opposition Score	Opposition Score	Opposition Score	Rank	Opposition Score	Opposition Score	Opposition Score	Rank
Ireland men's	Men's tournament	South Africa; L 14–33	United States; L 17–19	Kenya; W 12–7	3	did not advance	South Korea; W 31–0	Kenya; L 0–22	10

=== Men's tournament ===
Ireland national rugby sevens team qualified for the first time at the Olympics by winning the gold medal at the 2020 Final Olympic Qualification Tournament in Monaco, defeating the favorites France in the final 28–19.

Team roster

Ireland's 12-man squad plus one alternate was named on 6 July 2021.

Head coach: Anthony Eddy

No.	Pos.	Player	Date of birth (age)	Events	Points
1	FW	Jack Kelly	26 October 1997 (aged 23)	8	60
2	FW	Adam Leavy	21 September 1995 (aged 25)	8	15
3	FW	Harry McNulty	5 March 1993 (aged 28)	10	45
4	FW	Foster Horan	3 November 1992 (aged 28)	4	20
5	FW	Ian Fitzpatrick	25 August 1994 (aged 26)	3	20
6	BK	Billy Dardis (c)	31 May 1990 (aged 31)	10	164
7	BK	Jordan Conroy	10 March 1994 (aged 27)	9	225
8	BK	Greg O'Shea	23 March 1995 (aged 26)	8	25
9	BK	Mark Roche	25 January 1993 (aged 28)	8	81
10	BK	Terry Kennedy	4 July 1996 (aged 25)	9	120
11	BK	Hugo Lennox	6 March 1999 (aged 22)	8	27
12	BK	Gavin Mullin	29 November 1997 (aged 23)	0	0
13	BK	Bryan Mollen	25 September 1995 (aged 25)	8	30

Group play

Pos	Team	Pld	W	D	L	PF	PA	PD	Pts	Qualification
1	South Africa	3	3	0	0	64	31	+33	9	Quarter-finals
2	United States	3	2	0	1	50	48	+2	7	Quarter-finals
3	Ireland	3	1	0	2	43	59	−16	5	
4	Kenya	3	0	0	3	26	45	−19	3	

Updated to match(es) played on 26 July 2021. Source: Tokyo 2020 and World Rugby
Rules for classification: 1) Points; 2) Head-to-head result; 3) Point difference; 4) Points scored.

26 July 2021
11:00

South Africa	33–14	Ireland
Try: Z. Davids 2' c Visser 6' c Geduld 8' c Dry 12' c Gans 13' m Con: S. Davids (4/5) 2', 6', 8', 12'	(Tokyo 2020)	Try: Mullin 7' c Kennedy 10' c Con: Dardis (2/2) 7', 10'

Tokyo Stadium, Tokyo
Attendance: 0
Referee: Craig Evans (Wales)

26 July 2021
18:30

United States	19–17	Ireland
Try: Baker 1' c Hughes 3' m Tomasin 10' c Con: Hughes (2/3) 2', 10'	(Tokyo 2020)	Try: Lennox 7' m McNulty 8' m Horan 14' c Con: Dardis (0/2); Roche (1/1) 14'

Tokyo Stadium, Tokyo
Attendance: 0
Referee: James Doleman (New Zealand)

27 July 2021
11:00

Kenya	7–12	Ireland
Try: Onyala 13' c Con: Taabu (1/1) 13'	(Tokyo 2020)	Try: Lennox 1' m McNulty 2' c Con: Dardis (1/2) 2'

Tokyo Stadium, Tokyo
Attendance: 0
Referee: Jordan Way (Australia)

9–12th place playoff

27 July 2021
16:30

Ireland	31–0	South Korea
Try: Roche 1' m Conroy (2) 2' m, 13' c Mullin (2) 11' c, 14' c Con: Roche (0/2); Dardis (3/3) 12', 13', 14'	(Tokyo 2020)

Tokyo Stadium, Tokyo
Attendance: 0
Referee: Francisco González (Uruguay)

28 July 2021
9:30

Ireland	0–22	Kenya
	(Tokyo 2020)	Try: Olindi 5' c Ojee 10' m Ambaka 12' m Taabu 14' m Con: Olindi (1/1) 5'; Taabu (0/2); Amonde (0/1)

Tokyo Stadium, Tokyo
Attendance: 0
Referee: Damián Schneider (Argentina)

== Sailing ==
Irish sailors qualified one boat in each of the following classes through the class-associated World Championships, and the continental regattas.

On 11 June 2020, the Irish Sailing Association decided to forgo the domestic selection trials for the women's Laser Radial class because of the worldwide pandemic. Instead, Rio 2016 silver medalist Annalise Murphy was officially nominated to the Irish roster for her third straight Games, after finishing twelfth, as the country's top-ranked sailor, at the class-associated Worlds in Melbourne, Australia four months earlier.

Athlete	Event	Race													Net points	Final rank
Athlete	Event	1	2	3	4	5	6	7	8	9	10	11	12	M*	Net points	Final rank
Robert Dickson; Sean Waddilove	Men's 49er	1	12	11	13	~~DSQ~~	DSQ	8	18	8	3	17	1	EL	112	13
Annalise Murphy	Women's Laser Radial	35	12	24	37	9	10	1	2	30	~~40~~	—N/a		EL	160	18

M = Medal race; EL = Eliminated – did not advance into the medal race; DSQ = Disqualified; ~~20~~ = worst race result is discarded

== Shooting ==
Ireland granted an invitation from ISSF to send four-time Olympian Derek Burnett in the men's trap to the Olympics, as long as the minimum qualifying score (MQS) was fulfilled by 6 June 2021.

Athlete	Event	Qualification		Final	
Athlete	Event	Points	Rank	Points	Rank
Derek Burnett	Men's trap	118	26	Did not advance	

== Swimming ==
Irish swimmers further achieved qualifying standards in the following events, up to a maximum of 2 swimmers in each event at the Olympic Qualifying Time (OQT), and potentially 1 at the Olympic Selection Time (OST):

Men

Athlete	Event	Heat		Semifinal		Final	
Athlete	Event	Time	Rank	Time	Rank	Time	Rank
Darragh Greene	100 m breaststroke	1:00.30	29	Did not advance			
Darragh Greene	200 m breaststroke	2:11.09	23	Did not advance			
Brendan Hyland	200 m butterfly	1:57.09	23	Did not advance			
Shane Ryan	100 m backstroke	DNS		Did not advance			
Shane Ryan	100 m butterfly	52.52 NR	=37	Did not advance			
Daniel Wiffen	800 m freestyle	7:51.65 NR	14	—N/a		Did not advance	
Daniel Wiffen	1500 m freestyle	15:07.69 NR	20	—N/a		Did not advance	
Brendan Hyland; Finn McGeever; Jack McMillan; Shane Ryan	4 × 200 m freestyle relay	7:15.48	14	—N/a		Did not advance	

Women

Athlete	Event	Heat		Semifinal		Final	
Athlete	Event	Time	Rank	Time	Rank	Time	Rank
Danielle Hill	50 m freestyle	25.70	33	Did not advance			
Danielle Hill	100 m backstroke	1:00.86	25	Did not advance			
Mona McSharry	100 m breaststroke	1:06.39	9 Q	1:06.59	8 Q	1:06.94	8
Mona McSharry	200 m breaststroke	2:25.08 NR	20	Did not advance			
Ellen Walshe	100 m butterfly	59.35	24	Did not advance			
Ellen Walshe	200 m individual medley	2:13.34	19	Did not advance			

== Taekwondo ==
Ireland enter one athlete into the taekwondo competition for the first time at the Games. With the Grand Slam winner already qualified through the WT Olympic Rankings, the automatic spot associated with the winner defaulted to the Olympic rankings list, from which the first five taekwondo practitioners had already won quota places. As the next highest-ranked eligible taekwondo practitioner, 2019 European silver medalist Jack Woolley thereby secured Ireland's first ever Olympic quota place, in the men's flyweight category (58 kg).

Athlete	Event	Round of 16	Quarterfinals	Semifinals	Repechage	Final / BM	
Athlete	Event	Opposition Result	Opposition Result	Opposition Result	Opposition Result	Opposition Result	Rank
Jack Woolley	Men's −58 kg	Guzmán (ARG); L 19–22	Did not advance				

== Triathlon ==
Individual

Athlete	Event	Swim (1.5 km)	Trans 1	Bike (40 km)	Trans 2	Run (10 km)	Total Time	Rank
Russell White	Men's	18:35	0:44	57:40	0:36	37:05	1:54:40	47
Carolyn Hayes	Women's	20:10	0:43	1:06:04	0:30	34:43	2:02:10	23

== See also ==
- Ireland at the 2020 Summer Paralympics
