= 2018 World Rowing U23 Championships =

Rowing event

- Venue: Lake Malta
- Location: Poznań, Poland
- Dates: 25–29 July

The 2018 World Rowing U23 Championships was the 14th edition of the World Rowing U23 Championships and was held from 25 to 29 July 2018 in Poznań, Poland.

== Men's events ==
Event	Gold		Silver		Bronze	
Openweight events
M1x	Canada; Trevor Jones	6:48.70	Germany; Marc Weber	6:50.51	Bulgaria; Boris Yotov	6:51.42
M2x	Greece; Ioannis Kalandaridis; Christos Steryiakas	6:13.13	Netherlands; Melvin Twellaar; Luuk Adema	6:14.18	Poland; Fabian Barański; Mateusz Świętek	6:14.53
M4x	Great Britain; Rowan Law; Matthew Haywood; Josh Armstrong; Samuel Meijer	5:44.00	Italy; Riccardo Jansen; Luca Chiumento; Gergo Cziraki; Ivan Capuano	5:46.89	Germany; Henrik Runge; Steven-Christopher Hacker; Anton Finger; Johannes Lotz	5:49.90
M2-	South Africa; Charles Brittain; James Mitchell	6:41.74	Romania; Dumitru Alexandru Ciobică; Florin Sorin Lehaci	6:42.53	Italy; Andrea Maestrale; Raffaele Giulivo	6:48.23
M4-	Romania; Mihăiță Țigănescu; Cosmin Pascari; Ștefan Berariu; Ciprian Huc	5:50.61	Great Britain; David Ambler; Samuel Nunn; Charles Elwes; Felix Drinkall	5:52.74	New Zealand; Daniel Hunter Williamson; Matthew MacDonald; Thomas Mackintosh; Thomas Russell	5:52.81
M4+	United States; Peter Arata; William Creedon; Daniel Miklasevich; Viggo Hoite; Woods Connell (cox)	6:22.32	New Zealand; Angus McFarlane; Edwin Laver; Samuel Jones; Benjamin Taylor; Natalie Bocock (cox)	6:24.25	Italy; Gustavo Ferrio; Jacopo Frigerio; Nunzio Di Colandrea; Antonio Cascone; Filippo Wisenfeld (cox)	6:25.26
M8+	United States; Brennan Wetz; Justin Best; Christopher Carlson; Arne Landboe; Madison Molitor; Samuel Halbert; Michael Grady; Andrew Gaard; Rielly Milne (cox)	5:22.48	Great Britain; Benjamin Freeman; Harvey Kay; David Bewicke-Copley; Thomas Digby; Leonard Jenkins; Matthew Aldridge; William Stewart; Freddie Davidson; Hugo Ramambason (cox)	5:24.93	Romania; Alexandru Chioseaua; Mugurel Semciuc; Alexandru Matincă; Constantin Radu; Constantin Adam; Sergiu Bejan; Gheorghe Robert Dedu; Alexandru Cosmin Macovei; Adrian Munteanu (cox)	5:24.93
Lightweight events
LM1x	Brazil; Uncas Batista	6:51.27	France; Hugo Beurey	6:54.10	Australia; Sean Murphy	6:56.43
LM2x	Spain; Manel Balastegui; Rodrigo Conde Romero	6:16.29	Italy; Alfonso Scalzone; Gabriel Soares	6:16.66	Germany; Jonathan Schreiber; Julian Schneider	6:17.87
LM4x	Italy; Riccardo Italiano; Niels Torre; Lorenzo Fontana; Neri Muccini	6:10.13	Ireland; Miles Taylor; Niall Beggan; Ryan Ballantine; Andrew Goff	6:11.45	United States; Samuel Melvin; James Francis; Chase Deitner; Daniel Madden	6:12.55
LM2-	Ireland; Shane Mulvaney; David O'Malley	6:54.48	Greece; Antonios Papakonstantinou; Ioannis Marokos	6:56.24	Italy; Giuseppe Di Mare; Raffaele Serio	7:00.07

== Women's events ==
Event	Gold		Silver		Bronze	
Openweight events
W1x	New Zealand; Samantha Voss	7:28.34	United States; Emily Kallfelz	7:31.60	Bulgaria; Desislava Georgieva	7:36.17
W2x	Great Britain; Charlotte Hodgkins-Byrne; Anna Thornton	6:47.03	Germany; Leonie Menzel; Pia Greiten	6:48.34	Italy; Valentina Iseppi; Alessandra Montesano	6:49.17
W4x	Romania; Elena Logofatu; Georgiana Vasile; Nicoleta Pascanu; Simona Geanina Radis	6:40.97	Netherlands; Mieke Wilms; Minke Holleboom; Martine van den Boomgaard; Bente Paulis	6:43.88	Great Britain; Kyra Edwards; Zoe Adamason; Saska Budgett; Lucy Glover	6:45.68
W2-	United States; Regina Salmons; Alina Hagstrom	7:31.24	Great Britain; Heidi Long; Hannah Scott	7:33.68	Chile; Melita Abraham; Antonia Abraham	7:34.14
W4-	Russia; Kira Yuvchenko; Elizaveta Kornienko; Anna Aksenova; Valentina Plaksina	6:31.49	Romania; Madalina Heghes; Amalia Beres; Madalina-Gabriela Casu; Roxana Parascanu	6:34.22	China; Liu Xueren; Wang Zifeng; Liu Xiaoxin; Zhao Dongfang	6:35.43
W4+	United States; Sarah Johanek; Samantha Lamos; Carlisle Wheeler; Jennifer Mundelius; Isabel Weiss (cox)	7:02.60	Italy; Giovanna Schettino; Claudia Destefani; Benedetta Faravelli; Laura Meriano; Diletta Diverio (cox)	7:08.97	Russia; Marina Rubtsova; Elena Shapurova; Olga Zaruba; Veronika Voino; Elizaveta Krylova (cox)	7:11.14
W8+	Canada; Isabel Ruby-Hill; Ivy Elling Quaintance; Kendra Wells; Avalon Wasteneys; Morgan Rosts; Stephanie Grauer; Madison Mailey; Sydney Payne; Laura Court (cox)	6:04.61	Netherlands; Ilse Kolkman; Hijleke Nauta; Nika Vos; Dieuwertje den Besten; Eve Stewart; Lisa Goossens; Anna Eva Petersen; Miriam Visser; Eline Berger (cox)	6:06.58	United States; Hadley Irwin; Kaitlyn Kynast; Claire Collins; Liliane Lindsay; Alison Rusher; Marlee Blue; Elise Beuke; Brooke Pierson; Leigh Warner (cox)	6:08.04
Lightweight events
LW1x	Great Britain; Imogen Grant	7:29.98	Germany; Vera Spanke	7:34.95	Italy; Clara Guerra	7:35.27
LW2x	Italy; Stefania Buttignon; Silvia Crosio	6:54.41	Germany; Katrin Volk; Sophia Krause	6:57.34	Great Britain; Susannah Duncan; Danielle Semple	6:59.21
LW4x	Italy; Giulia Migmnemi; Paola Piazzola; Allegra Francalacci; Arianna Noseda	6:54.85	Netherlands; Marike Veldhuis; Anna Verkuil; Floor van Lieshout; Martine Veldhuis	6:59.99	France; Lou Lamarque; Loanne Guivarc; Aurélie Morizot; Marion Colard	7:03.32
LW2-	United States; Sarah Maietta; Caroline O'Brien	7:43.62	Germany; Janika Kölblin; Marie-Christine Gerhardt	7:52.95	Italy; Maria Zerboni; Bianca Laura Pelloni	7:58.44

== Medal table ==
Rank	Nation	Gold	Silver	Bronze	Total
1	United States (USA)	5	1	2	8
2	Italy (ITA)	3	3	6	12
3	Great Britain (GBR)	3	3	2	8
4	Romania (ROU)	2	2	1	5
5	Canada (CAN)	2	0	0	2
6	New Zealand (NZL)	1	1	1	3
7	Greece (GRE)	1	1	0	2
7	Ireland (IRL)	1	1	0	2
9	Russia (RUS)	1	0	1	2
10	Brazil (BRA)	1	0	0	1
10	South Africa (RSA)	1	0	0	1
10	Spain (ESP)	1	0	0	1
13	Germany (GER)	0	5	2	7
14	Netherlands (NED)	0	4	0	4
15	France (FRA)	0	1	1	2
16	Bulgaria (BUL)	0	0	2	2
17	Australia (AUS)	0	0	1	1
17	Chile (CHI)	0	0	1	1
17	China (CHN)	0	0	1	1
17	Poland (POL)	0	0	1	1
Totals (20 entries)		22	22	22	66

== See also ==
- 2018 World Rowing Championships
- 2018 World Rowing Junior Championships
