= 2025 World Rowing Championships – Women's single sculls =

Women's single sculls at the 2025 World Rowing Championships
- Venue: Dianshan Lake
- Location: Shanghai, China
- Dates: 22–28 September
- Competitors: 19 from 19 nations
- Winning time: 7:12.27

Medalists
gold medal	Fiona Murtagh	Ireland
silver medal	Lauren Henry	Great Britain
bronze medal	Frida Sanggaard Nielsen	Denmark

The women's single sculls competition at the 2025 World Rowing Championships took place at Dianshan Lake, in Shanghai.

== Schedule ==
The schedule was as follows:

Date	Time	Round
Monday 22 September 2025	14:05	Heats
Friday, 26 September 2025	12:35	Semifinals
Friday, 26 September 2025	12:11	Final C
Sunday 28 September 2025	13:15	Final B
Sunday 28 September 2025	14:17	Final A

All times are UTC+08:00

== Results ==
=== Heats ===
The two fastest boats in each heat and the four fastest times advanced directly to the semifinals. The remaining boats were sent to the Final C.

==== Heat 1 ====
Rank	Rower	Country	Time	Notes
1	Lauren Henry	Great Britain	7:17.75	SF
2	Paige Badenhorst	South Africa	7:32.85	SF
3	Alice Gnatta	Italy	7:37.71	FC
4	Zhang Shuxian	China	7:39.59	FC
5	Akoko Komlanvi	Togo	9:02.90	

==== Heat 2 ====
Rank	Rower	Country	Time	Notes
1	Viktorija Senkutė	Lithuania	7:17.93	SF
2	Alexandra Föster	Germany	7:21.83	SF
3	Lauren O'Connor	United States	7:23.94	SF
4	Katie Clark	Canada	7:24.25	SF
5	Kira Iuvchenko	Individual Neutral Athletes	7:35.77	FC

==== Heat 3 ====
Rank	Rower	Country	Time	Notes
1	Fiona Murtagh	Ireland	7:18.83	SF
2	Esther Briz	Spain	7:24.57	SF
3	Beatriz Tavares	Brazil	7:27.12	SF
4	Shiho Yonekawa	Japan	7:38.34	FC
5	Claire de Kok	Netherlands	7:44.19	FC

==== Heat 4 ====
Rank	Rower	Country	Time	Notes
1	Frida Sanggaard Nielsen	Denmark	7:21.10	SF
2	Mazarine Guilbert	Belgium	7:29.23	SF
3	Romy Cantwell	Australia	7:31.37	SF
4	Olivia Negrinotti	Switzerland	7:34.11	FC

=== Semifinals ===
The three fastest boats in each heat advance to the Final A. The remaining boats were sent to the Final B.

==== Semifinal 1 ====
Rank	Rower	Country	Time	Notes
1	Lauren Henry	Great Britain	7:28.75	FA
2	Frida Sanggaard Nielsen	Denmark	7:33.93	FA
3	Alexandra Föster	Germany	7:38.20	FA
4	Lauren O'Connor	United States	7:43.16	FB
5	Paige Badenhorst	South Africa	7:45.78	FB
6	Romy Cantwell	Australia	7:45.93	FB

==== Semifinal 2 ====
Rank	Rower	Country	Time	Notes
1	Fiona Murtagh	Ireland	7:29.61	FA
2	Viktorija Senkutė	Lithuania	7:32.11	FA
3	Esther Briz	Spain	7:36.82	FA
4	Katie Clark	Canada	7:37.23	FB
5	Beatriz Tavares	Brazil	7:46.09	FB
6	Mazarine Guilbert	Belgium	7:48.70	FB

=== Finals ===
The A final determined the rankings for places 1 to 6. Additional rankings were determined in the other finals.

==== Final C ====
Rank	Rower	Country	Time	Total rank
1	Alice Gnatta	Italy	7:46.22	13
2	Zhang Shuxian	China	7:46.75	14
3	Kira Iuvchenko	Individual Neutral Athletes	7:49.88	15
4	Shiho Yonekawa	Japan	7:51.52	16
5	Olivia Negrinotti	Switzerland	7:52.46	17
6	Claire de Kok	Netherlands	7:53.11	18

==== Final B ====
Rank	Rower	Country	Time	Total rank
1	Katie Clark	Canada	7:37.63	7
2	Paige Badenhorst	South Africa	7:38.45	8
3	Mazarine Guilbert	Belgium	7:40.10	9
4	Lauren O'Connor	United States	7:42.99	10
5	Romy Cantwell	Australia	7:45.46	11
6	Beatriz Tavares	Brazil	7:49.32	12

==== Final A ====
Rank	Rower	Country	Time	Notes
1st place, gold medalist(s)	Fiona Murtagh	Ireland	7:12.27	
2nd place, silver medalist(s)	Lauren Henry	Great Britain	7:12.30	
3rd place, bronze medalist(s)	Frida Sanggaard Nielsen	Denmark	7:15.89	
4	Viktorija Senkutė	Lithuania	7:20.67	
5	Alexandra Föster	Germany	7:26.31	
6	Esther Briz	Spain	7:31.49	
