= 2017 World Rowing U23 Championships =

Rowing event

- Venue: Complex Greben Kanal
- Location: Plovdiv, Bulgaria
- Dates: 19–23 July

The 2017 World Rowing U23 Championships was the 13th edition of the World Rowing U23 Championships and was held from 19 to 23 July 2017 at the Complex Greben Kanal in Plovdiv, Bulgaria.

== Medal summary ==
=== Men's events ===
Event	Gold		Silver		Bronze	
BLM1x	Brazil; Uncas Batista	6:59.46	Mexico; Alexis López	7:01.41	Italy; Lorenzo Galano	7:02.18
BLM2-	Italy; Giuseppe Di Mare; Alfonso Scalzone	6:33.05	Turkey; Mert Kaan Kartal; Fatih Ünsal	6:36.70	Ireland; Shane Mulvaney; David O'Malley	6:37.63
BLM2x	Italy; Antonio Vicino; Gabriel Soares	6:19.57	Denmark; Christian Hagemann; Alexander Modest	6:20.34	Spain; Jordi Rodríguez; Rodrigo Conde	6:20.48
BLM4-	Italy; Riccardo Italiano; Alberto Di Seyssel; Sebastiano Galoforo; Giovanni Ficarra	6:06.54	United States; John Gleim; Austin Treubert; Kyle James; Vincent Lamonte	6:07.89	Indonesia; Ferdiansyah Ferdiansyah; Ali Buton; Denri Maulidzar Al Ghifari; Ardi Isadi	6:09.41
BLM4x	Switzerland; Matthias Fernandez; Julian Müller; Andri Struzina; Pascal Ryser	5:50.62	Austria; Sebastian Kabas; Julian Brabec; Julian Schöberl; Rainer Kepplinger	5:52.09	Ireland; Niall Beggan; Stephen O'Connor; Andrew Goff; Shane O'Connell	5:52.37
BM1x	Canada; Trevor Jones	6:49.35	South Africa; Kyle Schoonbee	6:52.09	Poland; Natan Wegrzycki Szymczyk	6:55.03
BM2-	Romania; Mihaita-Vasile Tiganescu; Cosmin Pascari	6:31.79	France; Thibaud Turlan; Guillaume Turlan	6:33.49	Serbia; Viktor Pivač; Martin Mačković	6:34.10
BM2x	Great Britain; Sebastian Devereux; Samuel Meijer	6:18.14	France; Bastien Quiqueret; Maxime Ducret	6:19.06	Lithuania; Dovydas Nemeravičius; Armandas Kelmelis	6:21.57
BM4-	Australia; Robert Black; Harley Moore; Liam Donald; Adam Bakker	5:50.16	Great Britain; Robert Hurn; Thomas Digby; Charlie Elwes; Sholto Carnegie	5:53.64	Austria; Christoph Seifriedberger; Gabriel Hohensasser; Rudolph Querfeld; Ferdinand Querfeld	5:56.39
BM4+	Italy; Andrea Maestrale; Niccolò Pagani; Raffaele Giulivo; Leonardo Pietra Caprina; Enrico D'Aniello (cox)	6:04.72	Great Britain; George Stewart; Oliver Wilkes; Joshua Kent; Patrick Sullivan; Charles Clarke	6:07.24	United States; Benjamin Davison; Arne Landboe; Evan Olson; Tennyson Federspiel; Rielly Milne	6:08.07
BM4x	New Zealand; Jordan Parry; Ollie Maclean; Jack Lopas; Jack O'Leary	5:41.85	Russia; Andrey Potapkin; Aleksandr Vyazovkin; Nikolay Pimenov; Pavel Sorin	5:42.07	Italy; Gergo Cziraki; Andrea Panizza; Giacomo Gentili; Emanuele Fiume	5:44.00
BM8+	Netherlands; Michiel Oyen; Max Ponsen; Michiel Mantel; Jaap Scholten; Maarten Hurkmans; Simon van Dorp; Lex van den Herik; Bram Schwarz; Bjørn Kwee	5:29.55	Romania; Cristian Ivascu; Alexandru Matincă; Alexandru Cosmin Macovei; Constantin Adam; Constantin Radu; Sergiu Vasile Bejan; Gheorghe Robert Dedu; Ciprian Tudosă; Adrian Munteanu (cox)	5:31.57	Great Britain; Matthew Benstead; Alastair Douglass; Michael Glover; Matthew Aldridge; David Bewicke-Copley; Morgan Bolding; David Ambler; Arthur Doyle; Ian Middleton	5:32.64

=== Women's events ===
Event	Gold		Silver		Bronze	
BLW1x	Netherlands; Marieke Keijser	7:40.19	Italy; Clara Guerra	7:42.90	South Africa; Nicole van Wyk	7:44.27
BLW2x	Romania; Ionela-Livia Lehaci; Gianina-Elena Beleaga	7:01.24	Italy; Allegra Francalacci; Federica Cesarini	7:02.32	Greece; Thomais Emmanouilidou; Maria Pergouli	7:12.32
BLW4x	Italy; Asja Maregotto; Paola Piazzolla; Valentina Rodini; Giovanna Schettino	6:25.96	Netherlands; Marike Veldhuis; Iris Hochstenbach; Anna Verkuil; Martine Veldhuis	6:31.94	Germany; Marion Reichardt; Luise Asmussen; Vera Spanke; Leonie Neuhaus	6:32.26
BW1x	Sweden; Lovisa Claesson	7:36.99	Switzerland; Pascale Walker	7:40.05	United States; Emily Kallfelz	7:42.68
BW2-	Chile; Melita Abraham; Antonia Abraham	7:15.66	Australia; Annabelle McIntyre; Bronwyn Cox	7:17.55	United States; Kendall Brewer; Brooke Pierson	7:17.71
BW2x	Belarus; Tatsiana Klimovich; Krystina Staraselets	7:03.88	Italy; Stefania Gobbi; Valentina Iseppi	7:04.03	Greece; Anneta Kyridou; Dimitra-Sofia Tsamopoulou	7:04.97
BW4-	Netherlands; Elsbeth Beeres; Karolien Florijn; Ymkje Clevering; Veronique Meester	6:31.69	Romania; Cristina-Georgiana Popescu; Alina Ligia Pop; Beatrice-Madalina Parfenie; Roxana Parascanu	6:34.18	Germany; Annemieke Schanze; Tabea Schendekehl; Ida Kruse; Anna Schanze	6:39.70
BW4x	Great Britain; Anna Thornton; Charlotte Hodgkins-Byrne; Saskia Budgett; Lucy Glover	6:22.87	Australia; Harriet Hudson; Genevieve Horton; Rowena Meredith; Caitlin Cronin	6:24.70	Germany; Tina Christmann; Pia Greiten; Franziska Kampmann; Michaela Staelberg	6:25.36
BW8+	Canada; Morgan Rosts; Antonia Frappell; Madison Mailey; Sydney Payne; Karen Lefsrud; Stephanie Grauer; Julia Vander Hoeven; Caileigh Filmer; Laura Court	6:09.89	United States; Jessica Thoennes; Claire Collins; Emily Froehlich; Mariam Soufi; Ellen Heile; Dana Moffat; Madeleine Wanamaker; Elise Beuke; Leigh Warner	6:16.44	Russia; Kira Yuvchenko; Elizaveta Kornienko; Ekaterina Sevostianova; Maria Kubyshkina; Olga Zaruba; Anna Karpova; Anna Aksenova; Valentina Plaksina; Elizaveta Krylova	6:17.09

== Medal table ==
Rank	Nation	Gold	Silver	Bronze	Total
1	Italy (ITA)	5	3	2	10
2	Netherlands (NED)	3	1	0	4
3	Great Britain (GBR)	2	2	1	5
4	Romania (ROU)	2	2	0	4
5	Canada (CAN)	2	0	0	2
6	Australia (AUS)	1	2	0	3
7	Switzerland (SUI)	1	1	0	2
8	Belarus (BLR)	1	0	0	1
8	Brazil (BRA)	1	0	0	1
8	Chile (CHI)	1	0	0	1
8	New Zealand (NZL)	1	0	0	1
8	Sweden (SWE)	1	0	0	1
13	United States (USA)	0	2	3	5
14	France (FRA)	0	2	0	2
15	Austria (AUT)	0	1	1	2
15	Russia (RUS)	0	1	1	2
15	South Africa (RSA)	0	1	1	2
18	Denmark (DEN)	0	1	0	1
18	Mexico (MEX)	0	1	0	1
18	Turkey (TUR)	0	1	0	1
21	Germany (GER)	0	0	3	3
22	Greece (GRE)	0	0	2	2
22	Ireland (IRL)	0	0	2	2
24	Indonesia (IDN)	0	0	1	1
24	Lithuania (LTU)	0	0	1	1
24	Poland (POL)	0	0	1	1
24	Serbia (SRB)	0	0	1	1
24	Spain (ESP)	0	0	1	1
Totals (28 entries)		21	21	21	63

== See also ==
- 2017 World Rowing Championships
- World Rowing Junior Championships 2017
