= Madison Mailey =

Canadian rower

Personal information
- Born: October 22, 1996 (age 29) Vancouver, British Columbia, Canada
- Height: 187 cm (6 ft 2 in)
- Weight: 74 kg (163 lb)

Sport
- University team: Northeastern Huskies
Medal record
Women's Rowing
Representing Canada
Olympic Games
Gold medal – first place	2020 Tokyo	Eight
World Rowing Championships
Silver medal – second place	2018 Plovdiv	W8+
World Rowing U23 Championships
Gold medal – first place	2017 Plovdiv	BW8+
Gold medal – first place	2018 Poznań	BW8+

Madison Mailey (born October 22, 1996) is a Canadian rower.

== Career ==
Mailey is a two time U-23 World Champion in the women's eights boat, in 2017 and 2018. Later in 2018, Mailey helped the senior women's eights boat to a silver at the World Championships. In 2019, Mailey was part of the coxless four boat, finishing in eighth at the World Championships and qualifying Canada the boat for the 2020 Summer Olympics.

In June 2021, Mailey was named to Canada's 2020 Olympic team in the women's eights boat. At the Olympics, the boat won the gold medal, Canada's first in the event since 1992.
