= Sydney Payne =

Canadian rower (born 1997)

Personal information
- Born: September 16, 1997 (age 28) Toronto, Ontario, Canada
- Home town: Toronto, Ontario, Canada
- Height: 186 cm (6 ft 1 in)
- Weight: 75 kg (165 lb)

Sport
- University team: California Golden Bears
Medal record
Women's rowing
Representing Canada
Olympic Games
Gold medal – first place	2020 Tokyo	Eight
Silver medal – second place	2024 Paris	Eight
World Championships
Silver medal – second place	2018 Plovdiv	Eight
Bronze medal – third place	2022 Račice	Eight
World Championships (U23)
Gold medal – first place	2017 Plovdiv	Eight
Gold medal – first place	2018 Poznań	Eight

Sydney Payne (born September 16, 1997) is a Canadian rower. Payne's hometown is Toronto, Ontario.

== Career ==
Payne is a two time U-23 World Champion in the women's eights boat, in 2017 and 2018. Later in 2018, Payne helped the senior women's eights boat to a silver at the World Championships. In 2019, Payne was part of the coxless four boat, finishing in eighth at the World Championships and qualifying Canada the boat for the 2020 Summer Olympics.

In June 2021, Payne was named to Canada's 2020 Olympic team in the women's eights boat. At the Olympics, the boat won the gold medal, Canada's first in the event since 1992.
