= Trevor Jones (rower) =

Canadian rower

Personal information
- Born: October 1, 1997 (age 28) Pointe-Claire, Quebec, Canada
- Height: 203 cm (6 ft 8 in)
Medal record
Men's Rowing
Representing Canada
World Rowing U23 Championships
Gold medal – first place	2017 Plovdiv	M1x
Gold medal – first place	2018 Poznań	M1x

Trevor Jones (born October 1, 1997) is a Canadian rower. He was born in Pointe-Claire, Quebec and his hometown was Lakefield, Ontario. Jones is a two time World U23 champion in the single sculls event.

== Career ==
Jones won the single sculls at the 2017 and 2018 World Rowing U23 Championships. He missed competing at the 2019 version due to injury. At the 2019 World Rowing Championships, Jones finished in 14th place with Matt Buie in the double sculls, after training with his partner for only a month. After the Worlds, Rowing Canada re-evaluated the crews racing and decided to move Jones back to the single sculls boat.

In May 2021, Jones qualified the singles sculls boat for Canada's 2020 Olympic team, by finishing second at the 2021 FISA Final Qualification Regatta in Lucerne, Switzerland.
