= Olga Michałkiewicz =

Polish rower

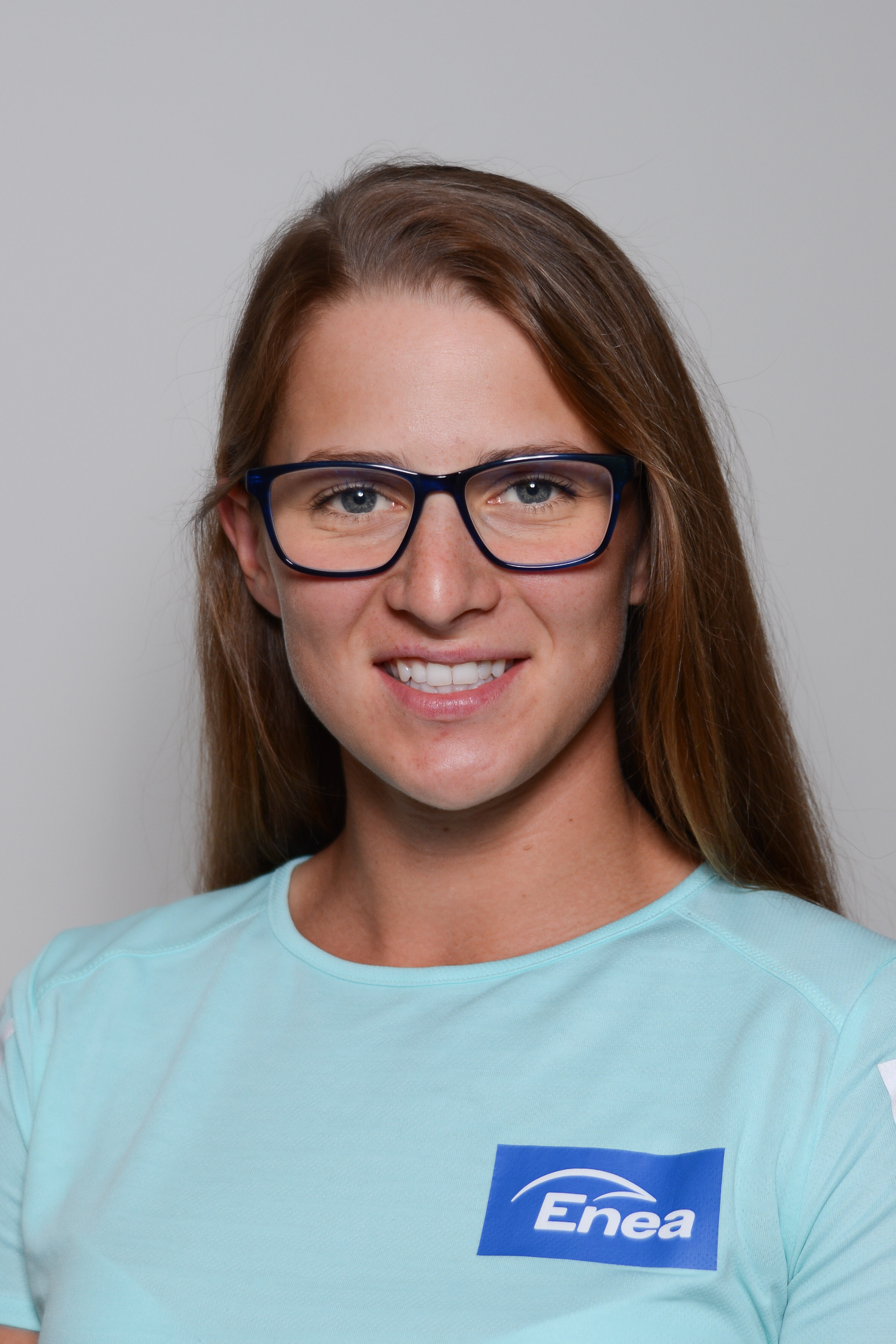

Personal information
- Born: 26 July 1994 (age 31) Szczecinek, Poland
- Height: 180 cm (5 ft 11 in)
- Weight: 73 kg (161 lb)

Sport
- Country: Poland
- Sport: Rowing

Achievements and titles
- Olympic finals: Tokyo 2020 W4-
Medal record
Rowing
Representing Poland
World Championships
Silver medal – second place	2017 Sarasota-Bradenton	W4-
World U23 Championships
Gold medal – first place	2015 Plovdiv	W4x
Gold medal – first place	2016 Rotterdam	W4x
European Championships
Bronze medal – third place	2018 Glasgow	W4-
Bronze medal – third place	2019 Lucerne	W4-

Olga Michałkiewicz (born 26 July 1994) is a Polish representative rower. She is an Olympian, dual underage world champion and a European bronze medalist in the coxless four.

At the 2019 World Rowing Championships in Ottensheim, Michałkiewicz competed in the W4- with Joanna Dittman, Monika Chabel and Maria Wierzbowska where they finished in fourth place in Final A which gave them a qualification berth for the 2020 Summer Olympics. She competed in the women's coxless four event at the 2020 Summer Olympics.
