= Rowing at the 2018 Asian Games – Women's coxless four =

Women's coxless four at the 2018 Asian Games
- Venue: Jakabaring Lake
- Date: 20–24 August 2018
- Competitors: 28 from 7 nations

Medalists
gold medal	China; Yi Liqin, Guo Linlin, Zhang Min, Wang Fei
silver medal	Vietnam; Đinh Thị Hảo, Trần Thị An, Lê Thị Hiền, Phạm Thị Huệ
bronze medal	Indonesia; Chelsea Corputty, Wa Ode Fitri Rahmanjani, Julianti, Yayah Rokayah

The women's coxless four competition at the 2018 Asian Games was held on 20–24 August at the JSC Lake.

== Schedule ==
All times are Western Indonesia Time (UTC+07:00)

Date	Time	Event
Monday, 20 August 2018	10:20	Heats
Wednesday, 22 August 2018	10:30	Repechage
Friday, 24 August 2018	10:35	Final

== Results ==
=== Heats ===
- Qualification: 1 → Final (FA), 2–4 → Repechage (R)

==== Heat 1 ====
Rank	Team	Time	Notes
1	China (CHN); Yi Liqin; Guo Linlin; Zhang Min; Wang Fei	7:12.38	FA
2	Vietnam (VIE); Đinh Thị Hảo; Trần Thị An; Lê Thị Hiền; Phạm Thị Huệ	7:23.98	R
3	Indonesia (INA); Chelsea Corputty; Wa Ode Fitri Rahmanjani; Julianti; Yayah Rokayah	7:37.91	R
4	India (IND); Sanjukta Dungdung; Annu; Navneet Kaur; Yamini Singh	7:57.33	R

==== Heat 2 ====
Rank	Team	Time	Notes
1	Kazakhstan (KAZ); Mariya Poida; Alexandra Opachanova; Svetlana Germanovich; Viktoriya Chepikova	7:32.32	FA
2	Myanmar (MYA); Ei Phyu; Aye Thuzar; Shwe Zin Latt; Nilar Win	7:42.98	R
3	Thailand (THA); Patchareeya Jardsakul; Nattariwan Nunchai; Premruethai Hongseethong; Nuntida Krajangjam	8:00.50	R

=== Repechage ===
- Qualification: 1–4 → Final (FA)

Rank	Team	Time	Notes
1	Vietnam (VIE); Đinh Thị Hảo; Trần Thị An; Lê Thị Hiền; Phạm Thị Huệ	7:29.34	FA
2	Indonesia (INA); Chelsea Corputty; Wa Ode Fitri Rahmanjani; Julianti; Yayah Rokayah	7:39.81	FA
3	Myanmar (MYA); Ei Phyu; Aye Thuzar; Shwe Zin Latt; Nilar Win	7:44.19	FA
4	India (IND); Sanjukta Dungdung; Annu; Navneet Kaur; Yamini Singh	7:53.29	FA
5	Thailand (THA); Patchareeya Jardsakul; Nattariwan Nunchai; Premruethai Hongseethong; Nuntida Krajangjam	8:05.92	

=== Final ===
Rank	Team	Time
1st place, gold medalist(s)	China (CHN); Yi Liqin; Guo Linlin; Zhang Min; Wang Fei	7:05.50
2nd place, silver medalist(s)	Vietnam (VIE); Đinh Thị Hảo; Trần Thị An; Lê Thị Hiền; Phạm Thị Huệ	7:14.52
3rd place, bronze medalist(s)	Indonesia (INA); Chelsea Corputty; Wa Ode Fitri Rahmanjani; Julianti; Yayah Rokayah	7:19.02
4	Kazakhstan (KAZ); Mariya Poida; Alexandra Opachanova; Svetlana Germanovich; Viktoriya Chepikova	7:23.15
5	Myanmar (MYA); Ei Phyu; Aye Thuzar; Shwe Zin Latt; Nilar Win	7:33.17
6	India (IND); Sanjukta Dungdung; Annu; Navneet Kaur; Yamini Singh	7:43.49
