= Uncas Batista =

Brazilian rower (born 1996)

Personal information
- Nationality: Brazilian
- Born: 14 October 1996 (age 29)

Sport
- Country: Brazil
- Sport: Rowing
Medal record
Men's rowing
Representing Brazil
Pan American Games
| Bronze medal – third place | 2019 Lima | Double sculls |

Uncas Tales Batista (born 14 October 1996) is a Brazilian rower, lightweight single sculler.

He won the gold medal at the 2017 World Under 23 Championships. From a second place in the semifinal to become champion for the second year in a row. Batista has also been competing at the elite level with Final A at the 2017 World Rowing Championships. He won the bronze medal at the 2019 Pan American Games.
