= Ellen Hogerwerf =

Dutch rower (born 1989)

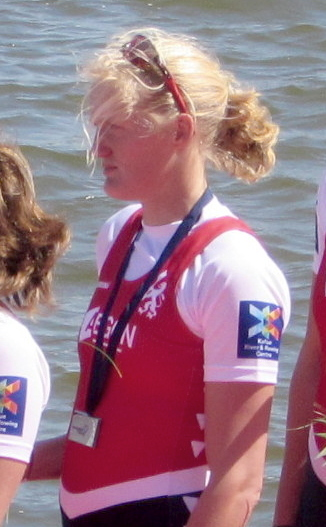
- Hogerwerf at the 2016 European Championships

Personal information
- Full name: Elisabeth Wilhelmina Hogerwerf
- Nationality: Dutch
- Born: 10 February 1989 (age 37) Gouda, Netherlands
- Height: 183 cm (6 ft 0 in)
- Weight: 72 kg (159 lb)

Sport
- Country: Netherlands
- Sport: Rowing
- Event(s): Coxless pair, Coxless four, Eight
- Club: DSR Proteus-Eretes
- Coached by: Josy Verdonkschot
Medal record
Women's rowing
Representing the Netherlands
Olympic Games
Silver medal – second place	2020 Tokyo	Coxless four
World Championships
Silver medal – second place	2019 Ottensheim	Coxless four
Bronze medal – third place	2011 Bled	Coxless four
European Championships
Gold medal – first place	2019 Lucerne	Coxless four
Gold medal – first place	2020 Poznan	Coxless Four
Gold medal – first place	2021 Varese	Coxless Four
Silver medal – second place	2015 Poznań	Coxless pair
Silver medal – second place	2016 Brandenburg	Eight
Bronze medal – third place	2018 Glasgow	Eight

Elisabeth Wilhelmina "Ellen" Hogerwerf (born 10 February 1989) is a Dutch rower. She is a three time Olympian and an Olympic silver medalist in the coxless four at Tokyo 2020.

Hogerwerf placed eighth in the double sculls at the 2012 Olympics and sixth in the eights at the 2016 Rio Games. She won a bronze medal at the 2011 World Championships and two silver medals at the European championships in 2015–2016. She was a member of the Dutch coxless four, along with Karolien Florijn, Ymkje Clevering and Veronique Meester, that won an Olympic silver medal in Tokyo 2020. The same crew was a three-time European Champion (in 2019, 2020 and 2021) and won a silver medal at the 2019 World Rowing Championships.

Hogerwerf has a degree in mechanical engineering from Delft University of Technology.
