= Guo Linlin =

Chinese rower

Personal information
- Nationality: Chinese
- Born: 13 November 1992 (age 33) Hengshui, China

Sport
- Sport: Rowing
Medal record
Women's rowing
Representing China
Olympic Games
Bronze medal – third place	2020 Tokyo	Eight
Asian Games
Gold medal – first place	2018 Jakarta-Palembang	Coxless four

Guo Linlin (born 13 November 1992) is a Chinese rower. She competed in the women's eight event at the 2020 Summer Olympics.
