= Stephanie Grauer =

Canadian rower

Personal information
- Born: March 23, 1997 (age 29) Vancouver, British Columbia, Canada
- Height: 182 cm (6 ft 0 in)
Medal record
Women's Rowing
Representing Canada
World Rowing Championships
Silver medal – second place	2018 Plovdiv	W8+
World Rowing U23 Championships
Gold medal – first place	2017 Plovdiv	BW8+
Gold medal – first place	2018 Poznań	BW8+

Stephanie Grauer (born March 23, 1997) is a Canadian rower.

== Career ==
Grauer is a two time U-23 World Champion in the women's eights boat, in 2017 and 2018. Later in 2018, Grauer helped the senior women's eights boat to a silver at the World Championships. In 2019, Grauer was part of the coxless four boat, finishing in eighth at the World Championships and qualifying Canada the boat for the 2020 Summer Olympics.

In June 2021, Grauer was named to Canada's 2020 Olympic team in the women's coxless four boat.
