= Christina Johansen =

Danish rower (born 1992)

Personal information
- Full name: Christina Juhl Johansen
- Nationality: Danish
- Born: 17 July 1992 (age 33) Tommerup Stationsby

Sport
- Country: Denmark
- Sport: Rowing
- Event: Coxless four
Medal record
World Championships
Bronze medal – third place	2019 Ottensheim	Coxless four

Christina Juhl Johansen (born 17 July 1992) is a Danish rower.

She won a medal at the 2019 World Rowing Championships.
