= Frida Sanggaard Nielsen =

Danish rower (born 1998)

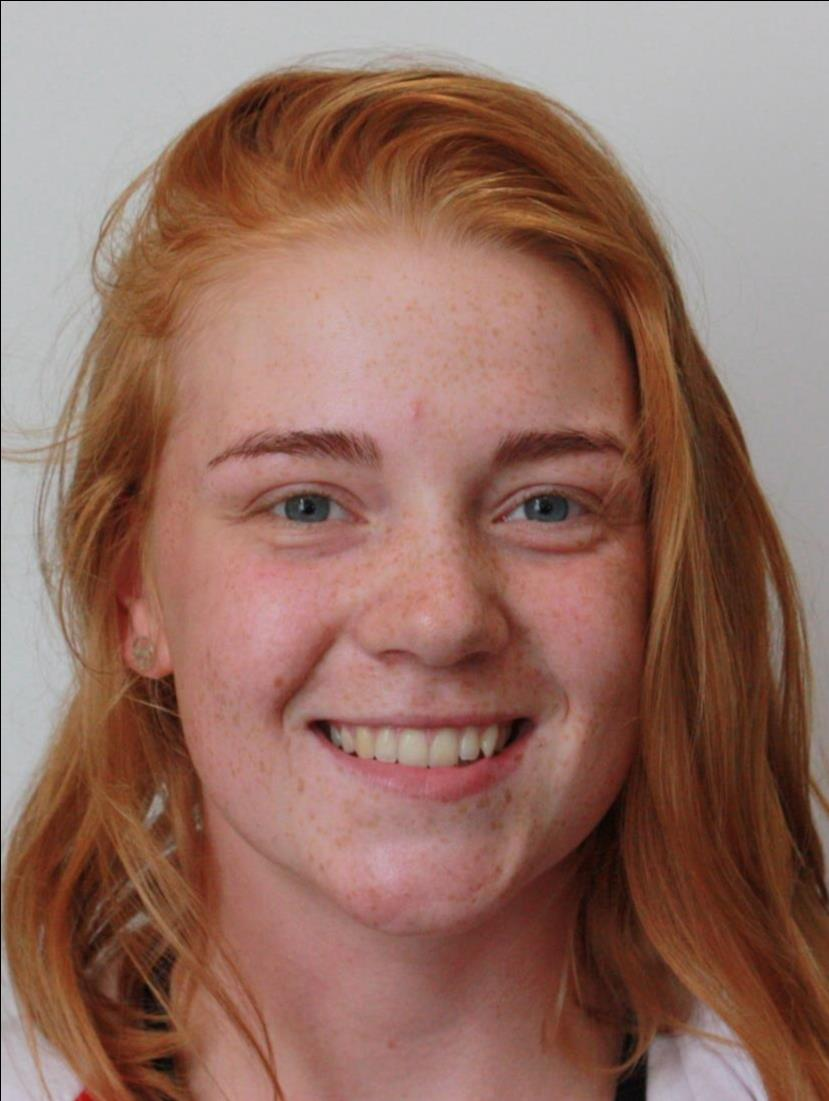

Personal information
- Nationality: Danish
- Born: 1 December 1998 (age 27) Copenhagen, Denmark

Sport
- Country: Denmark
- Sport: Rowing
- Event: Coxless four
Medal record
Women's rowing
Representing Denmark
World Championships
Bronze medal – third place	2019 Ottensheim	Coxless four
Bronze medal – third place	2025 Shanghai	Single sculls
European Championships
Bronze medal – third place	2025 Plovdiv	Single sculls

Frida Sanggaard Nielsen (born 1 December 1998) is a Danish rower.

She started rowing in 2015 while an exchange student in Rockford, Michigan. Her first rowing club was Michigan's Rockford Rowing Club. Her main position is Bow.

Since moving back to her hometown in 2016, Nielsen has represented her nation at the 2016 Junior European Championships and at the 2016 Junior World Championships, where she and her JW2 rowing partner Ida Petersen finished 2nd both times, earning silver medals for Denmark. She and Petersen then earned gold in a women's fours crew with Olympic bronze medallists Hedvig Laerke Rasmussen and Anne Andersen at the 2016 Head of the Charles Regatta.
