= Wang Fei (rower) =

Chinese rower

Personal information
- Nationality: Chinese
- Born: 12 July 1988 (age 37)

Sport
- Sport: Rowing
Medal record
Women's rowing
Representing China
Asian Games
Gold medal – first place	2018 Jakarta-Palembang	Coxless four

Wang Fei (born 12 July 1988) is a Chinese rower. She competed in the women's coxless four event at the 2020 Summer Olympics.
