= Mădălina Hegheș =

Romanian rower

Personal information
- Nationality: Romanian
- Born: 29 September 1997 (age 27)

Sport
- Sport: Rowing

Mădălina Hegheș (born 29 September 1997) is a Romanian rower. She competed in the women's coxless four event at the 2020 Summer Olympics.
