= Ida Jacobsen =

Danish rower (born 1995)

Personal information
- Full name: Ida Gørtz Jacobsen
- Nationality: Danish
- Born: 1 March 1995 (age 31)
- Height: 1.73 m (5 ft 8 in)
- Weight: 62 kg (137 lb)

Sport
- Country: Denmark
- Sport: Rowing
- Event: Coxless four
- Club: Cambridge University
Medal record
World Championships
Bronze medal – third place	2019 Ottensheim	Coxless four

Ida Gørtz Jacobsen (born 1 March 1995) is a Danish rower.

Jacobsen won a medal at the 2019 World Rowing Championships. She was part of the Cambridge boat that won the 2019 boat race beating Oxford by 5 lengths.

She represented Denmark at the 2020 Summer Olympics in Tokyo.
