= Joanna Dittmann =

Polish rower

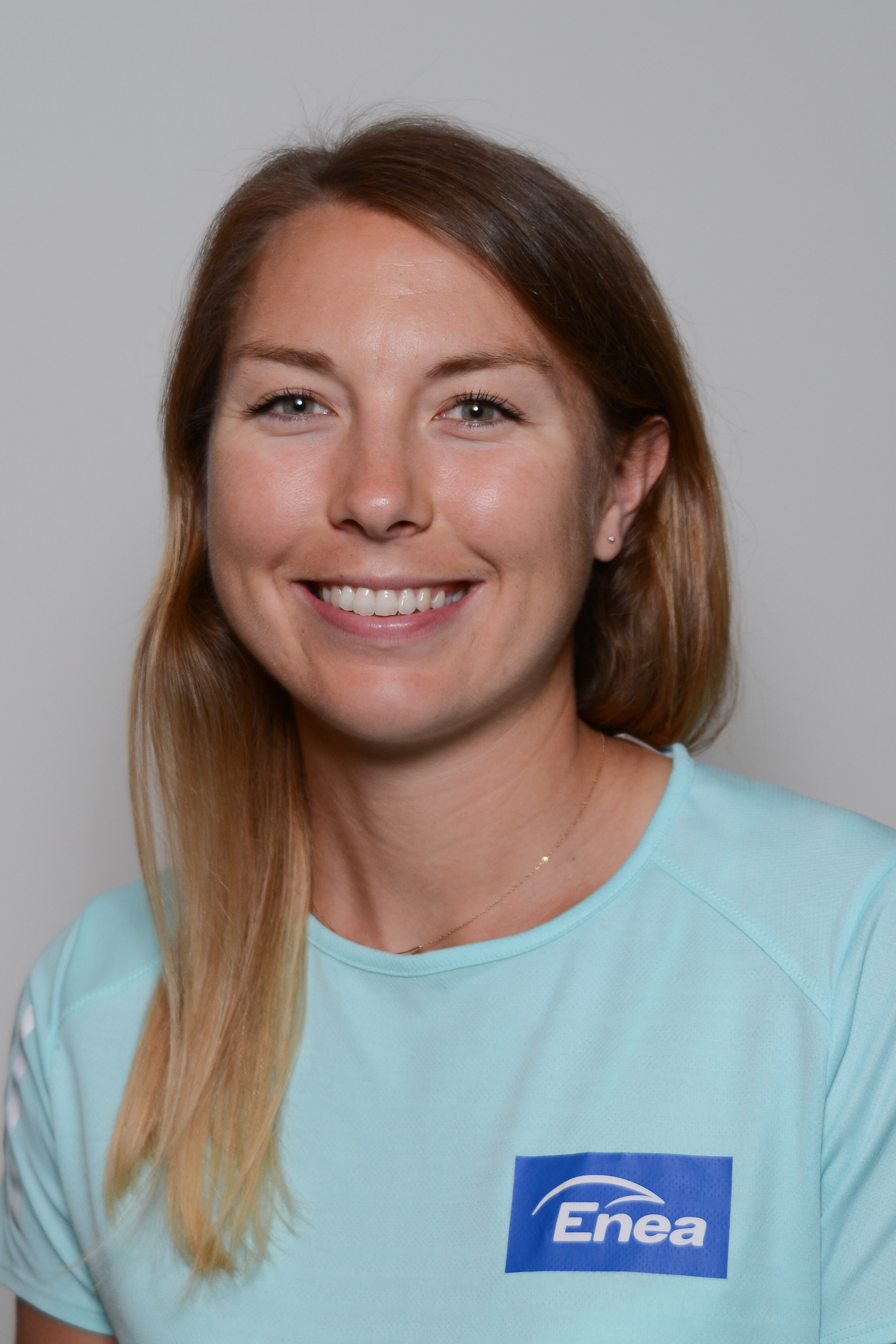

Personal information
- Nationality: Polish
- Born: 9 February 1992 (age 33)

Sport
- Sport: Rowing

Achievements and titles
- Olympic finals: Tokyo 2020 W4-

Joanna Dittmann (born 9 February 1992) is a Polish rower. She competed in the women's coxless four event at the 2020 Summer Olympics.
