= Eimear Lambe =

Irish rower (born 1997)

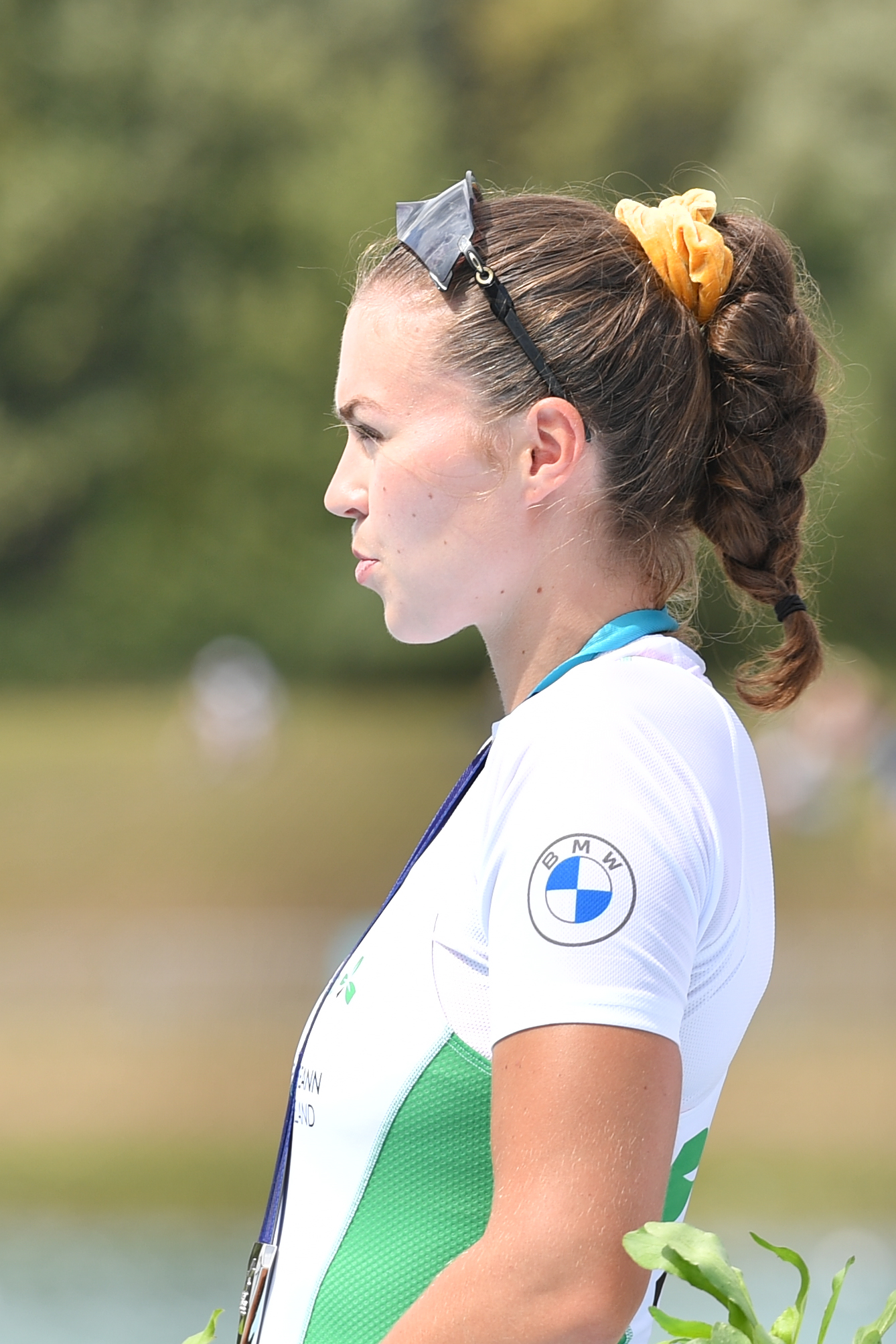
- Lambe in 2022

Personal information
- Nationality: Irish
- Born: 11 August 1997 (age 28) Cabra, Ireland

Sport
- Sport: Rowing
Medal record
Women's rowing
Representing Ireland
Olympic Games
Bronze medal – third place	2020 Tokyo	Coxless four
European Championships
Silver medal – second place	2021 Varese	Coxless four
Silver medal – second place	2022 Munich	Coxless four
Bronze medal – third place	2020 Poznan	Coxless four

Eimear Lambe (/ˈiːmər ˈlæm/; born 11 August 1997) is an Irish rower. She competed in the women's coxless four event at the 2020 Summer Olympics and won a bronze medal. Along with her team-mates, she was named as the Irish Times/Sport Ireland Sportswoman for July 2021.

Lambe was awarded a UCD Ad Astra Elite Athlete Scholarship and graduated from University College Dublin with a Bachelor of Commerce - International (BComm Int) in 2019. She is the recipient of the 2022 UCD Alumni Award in Law
