= Aifric Keogh =

Irish rower (born 1992)

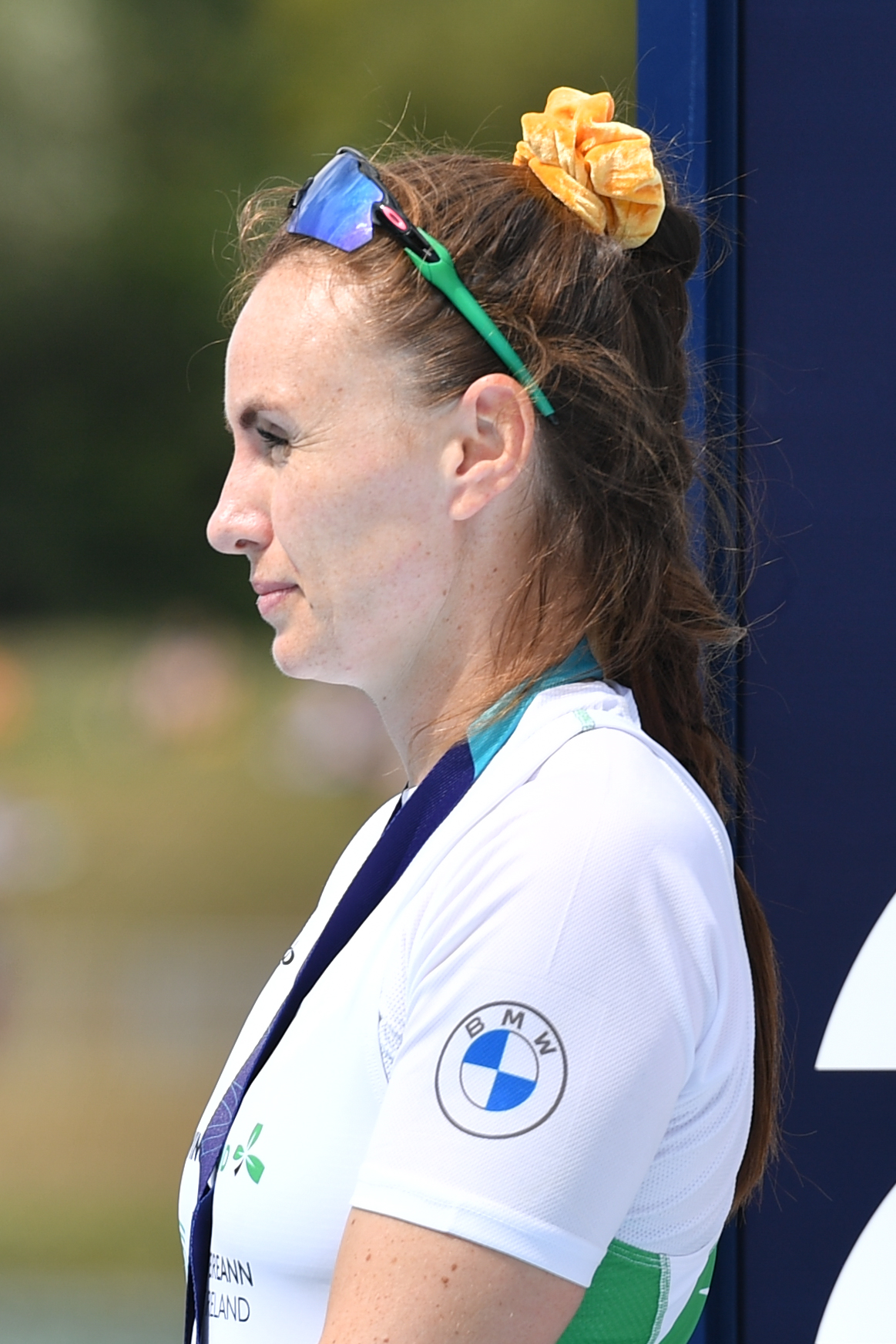
- Keogh in 2022

Personal information
- Nationality: Irish
- Born: 9 July 1992 (age 33) Furbo, County Galway, Ireland

Sport
- Sport: Rowing
Medal record
Women's rowing
Representing Ireland
Olympic Games
Bronze medal – third place	2020 Tokyo	Coxless four
European Championships
Silver medal – second place	2021 Varese	Coxless four
Silver medal – second place	2022 Munich	Coxless four
Bronze medal – third place	2020 Poznan	Coxless four

Aifric Keogh (/ˈæfrɪk ˈkjoʊ/ AF-rik KYOH; born 9 July 1992) is an Irish rower. She competed in the women's coxless four event at the 2020 Summer Olympics and won a bronze medal. Along with her team-mates, she was named as the Irish Times/Sport Ireland Sportswoman for July 2021. Keogh also competed at the 2024 Summer Olympics.
