= Emily Hegarty =

Irish rower (born 1998)

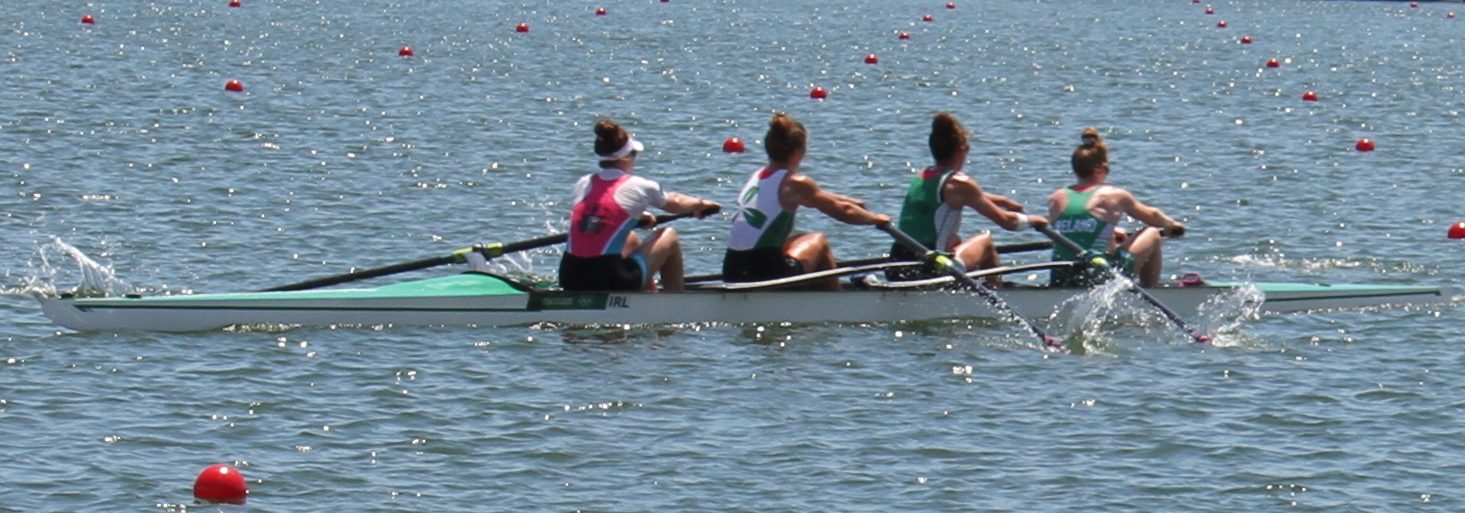
- Hegarty at the 2020 Summer Olympics

Personal information
- Nationality: Irish
- Born: 3 August 1998 (age 27) Skibbereen, Ireland

Sport
- Sport: Rowing
Medal record
Women's rowing
Representing Ireland
Olympic Games
Bronze medal – third place	2020 Tokyo	Coxless four

Emily Hegarty (born 3 August 1998) is an Irish rower. She competed in the women's coxless four event at the 2020 Summer Olympics and won a bronze medal. At the same Olympics, her third cousin Paul O'Donovan also won a gold medal for rowing in the lightweight double sculls. Along with her team-mates, she was named as the Irish Times/Sport Ireland Sportswoman for July 2021.

== Early life ==
Emily Hegarty was born on the 3rd August 1998 to Jerry and Mary Hegarty, the second of their three children. Hegarty started rowing at age 11.
