= World Rowing U23 Championships =

International rowing regatta

World Rowing U23 Championships is an international rowing regatta organized by the World Rowing Federation. Rowers can compete in U23 events until 31 December of the year in which they turn 22. The World Rowing U23 Championship is just under a week long and consists of a progression system to advance from heats to finals. The regatta has 22 boat classes, which includes the 8 lightweight boat classes.

== History ==
From 1976, the U23 event was organised as the Match des Séniors and from 1992 onwards as the Nations Cup, independently from FISA. In 2002, it became the World Rowing U23 Regatta, before becoming the Championships in 2005.

The 2026 championships were held in Duisburg, Germany, from 23 to 26 July. Greece topped the medal table with four gold and two silver medals, while the United States also won four gold medals.

== Venues ==
Ed.	Year	City	Country	Date	Nations
1	2005	Amsterdam	Netherlands	21–24 July	
2	2006	Heindonk	Belgium	20–23 July	
3	2007	Glasgow	United Kingdom	26–29 July	
4	2008	Brandenburg an der Havel	Germany	17–20 July	
5	2009	Račice	Czech Republic	26–29 July	
6	2010	Brest	Belarus	22–25 July	58
7	2011	Amsterdam	Netherlands	20–24 July	63
8	2012	Trakai	Lithuania	11–15 July	55
9	2013	Ottensheim	Austria	24–28 July	
10	2014	Varese	Italy	23–27 July	
11	2015	Plovdiv	Bulgaria	22–26 July	
12	2016	Rotterdam	Netherlands	21–28 August	
13	2017	Plovdiv	Bulgaria	19–23 July	
14	2018	Poznań	Poland	25–29 July	
15	2019	Sarasota	United States	24–28 July	
16	2020	Bled	Slovenia	16–23 August [cancelled]	
17	2021	Račice	Czech Republic	7–11 July	54
18	2022	Varese	Italy	25–30 July	56
19	2023	Plovdiv	Bulgaria	19–23 July	51
20	2024	St. Catharines	Canada	18–25 August	
21	2025	Poznań	Poland	23–27 July	
22	2026	Duisburg	Germany	23–26 July	57

== Medal table ==
Results from 2005–2026.

Rank	Nation	Gold	Silver	Bronze	Total
1	Italy	66	45	37	148
2	Germany	59	73	74	206
3	Great Britain	46	35	30	111
4	United States	40	29	24	93
5	Romania	28	16	13	57
6	Greece	28	15	9	52
7	New Zealand	23	23	16	62
8	Netherlands	14	19	17	50
9	Australia	12	23	27	62
10	Canada	11	5	14	30
11	Belarus	10	7	5	22
12	Poland	9	15	17	41
13	Czech Republic	9	6	4	19
14	Switzerland	8	7	12	27
15	Lithuania	7	7	6	20
16	France	6	26	26	58
17	Spain	5	5	9	19
18	Turkey	5	5	4	14
19	South Africa	4	8	4	16
20	Ukraine	4	5	2	11
21	Ireland	3	9	10	22
22	Russia	3	5	11	19
23	Austria	3	3	4	10
24	Serbia	3	1	7	11
25	Chile	3	1	2	6
25	Croatia	3	1	2	6
27	Portugal	3	1	1	5
28	Denmark	2	4	8	14
29	Serbia and Montenegro	2	2	0	4
30	Belgium	2	1	6	9
31	Brazil	2	1	1	4
32	Iran	2	1	0	3
33	Latvia	2	0	2	4
34	Sweden	1	4	0	5
35	Estonia	1	2	2	5
36	Bulgaria	1	1	4	6
37	China	1	1	1	3
38	Azerbaijan	1	1	0	2
39	Uruguay	1	0	0	1
40	Hungary	0	3	5	8
41	Norway	0	3	2	5
42	Japan	0	3	1	4
–	Individual Neutral Athletes	0	2	1	3
43	Mexico	0	1	2	3
44	Peru	0	1	1	2
44	Slovenia	0	1	1	2
46	Argentina	0	1	0	1
46	Moldova	0	1	0	1
46	Slovakia	0	1	0	1
49	Cyprus	0	0	1	1
49	Hong Kong	0	0	1	1
49	Indonesia	0	0	1	1
49	Kazakhstan	0	0	1	1
49	Thailand	0	0	1	1
49	Uzbekistan	0	0	1	1
Totals (54 entries)		433	430	430	1,293
