= 2019 World Rowing Championships – Women's quadruple sculls =

Women's quadruple sculls at the 2019 World Rowing Championships
- Venue: Linz-Ottensheim
- Location: Ottensheim, Austria
- Dates: 27 – 31 August
- Competitors: 48 from 12 nations
- Winning time: 6:34.65

Medalists
gold medal	Chen Yunxia; Zhang Ling; Lü Yang; Cui Xiaotong	China
silver medal	Agnieszka Kobus-Zawojska; Marta Wieliczko; Maria Springwald; Katarzyna Zillmann	Poland
bronze medal	Olivia van Rooijen; Inge Janssen; Sophie Souwer; Nicole Beukers	Netherlands

The women's quadruple sculls competition at the 2019 World Rowing Championships took place at the Linz-Ottensheim regatta venue. A top-eight finish ensured qualification for the Tokyo Olympics.

== Schedule ==
The schedule was as follows:

Date	Time	Round
Tuesday 27 August 2019	11:55	Heats
Thursday 29 August 2019	13:27	Repechages
Saturday 31 August 2019	12:24	Final B
Saturday 31 August 2019	15:14	Final A

All times are Central European Summer Time (UTC+2)

== Results ==
=== Heats ===
Heat winners advanced directly to the A final. The remaining boats were sent to the repechages.

==== Heat 1 ====
Rank	Rowers	Country	Time	Notes
1	Olivia van Rooijen; Inge Janssen; Sophie Souwer; Nicole Beukers	Netherlands	6:17.96	FA
2	Agnieszka Kobus-Zawojska; Marta Wieliczko; Maria Springwald; Katarzyna Zillmann	Poland	6:18.75	R
3	Daniela Schultze; Michaela Stälberg; Franziska Kampmann; Frieda Hämmerling	Germany	6:20.46	R
4	Lauren Schmetterling; Sophia Vitas; Emily Huelskamp; Kathryn Roach	United States	6:21.72	R
5	Ludovica Serafini; Silvia Terrazzi; Clara Guerra; Chiara Ondoli	Italy	6:26.48	R
6	Tabita Maftei; Larisa Elena Roşu; Elena Logofatu; Nicoleta Pascanu	Romania	6:38.80	R

==== Heat 2 ====
Rank	Rowers	Country	Time	Notes
1	Chen Yunxia; Zhang Ling; Lü Yang; Cui Xiaotong	China	6:18.12	FA
2	Kirstyn Goodger; Ruby Tew; Samantha Voss; Hannah Osborne	New Zealand	6:23.66	R
3	Jessica Leyden; Melissa Wilson; Mathilda Hodgkins-Byrne; Charlotte Hodgkins-Byrne	Great Britain	6:25.63	R
4	Iuliia Volgina; Hanna Prakhatsen; Aleksandra Bolshakova; Ekaterina Kurochkina	Russia	6:30.70	R
5	Rowena Meredith; Katrina Bateman; Fiona Ewing; Cara Grzeskowiak	Australia	6:31.78	R
6	Violaine Aernoudts; Margaux Bailleul; Julie Voirin; Anne-Sophie Marzin	France	6:40.22	R

=== Repechages ===
The two fastest boats in each repechage advanced to the A final. The remaining boats were sent to the B final.

==== Repechage 1 ====
Rank	Rowers	Country	Time	Notes
1	Agnieszka Kobus-Zawojska; Marta Wieliczko; Maria Springwald; Katarzyna Zillmann	Poland	6:12.10	FA
2	Jessica Leyden; Melissa Wilson; Mathilda Hodgkins-Byrne; Charlotte Hodgkins-Byrne	Great Britain	6:13.82	FA
3	Lauren Schmetterling; Sophia Vitas; Emily Huelskamp; Kathryn Roach	United States	6:14.00	FB
4	Tabita Maftei; Larisa Elena Roşu; Elena Logofatu; Nicoleta Pascanu	Romania	6:24.06	FB
5	Rowena Meredith; Katrina Bateman; Fiona Ewing; Cara Grzeskowiak	Australia	6:29.73	FB

==== Repechage 2 ====
Rank	Rowers	Country	Time	Notes
1	Daniela Schultze; Michaela Stälberg; Franziska Kampmann; Frieda Hämmerling	Germany	6:14.70	FA
2	Kirstyn Goodger; Ruby Tew; Samantha Voss; Hannah Osborne	New Zealand	6:16.37	FA
3	Ludovica Serafini; Silvia Terrazzi; Clara Guerra; Chiara Ondoli	Italy	6:16.74	FB
4	Iuliia Volgina; Hanna Prakhatsen; Aleksandra Bolshakova; Ekaterina Kurochkina	Russia	6:26.58	FB
5	Violaine Aernoudts; Margaux Bailleul; Julie Voirin; Anne-Sophie Marzin	France	6:33.16	FB

=== Finals ===
The A final determined the rankings for places 1 to 6. Additional rankings were determined in the B final.

==== Final B ====
Rank	Rowers	Country	Time
1	Lauren Schmetterling; Sophia Vitas; Emily Huelskamp; Kathryn Roach	United States	6:40.11
2	Ludovica Serafini; Silvia Terrazzi; Clara Guerra; Chiara Ondoli	Italy	6:45.86
3	Iuliia Volgina; Hanna Prakhatsen; Aleksandra Bolshakova; Ekaterina Kurochkina	Russia	6:47.90
4	Rowena Meredith; Katrina Bateman; Fiona Ewing; Cara Grzeskowiak	Australia	6:49.44
5	Tabita Maftei; Larisa Elena Roşu; Elena Logofatu; Nicoleta Pascanu	Romania	6:51.42
6	Violaine Aernoudts; Margaux Bailleul; Julie Voirin; Anne-Sophie Marzin	France	6:56.39

==== Final A ====
Rank	Rowers	Country	Time
1st place, gold medalist(s)	Chen Yunxia; Zhang Ling; Lü Yang; Cui Xiaotong	China	6:34.65
2nd place, silver medalist(s)	Agnieszka Kobus-Zawojska; Marta Wieliczko; Maria Springwald; Katarzyna Zillmann	Poland	6:36.59
3rd place, bronze medalist(s)	Olivia van Rooijen; Inge Janssen; Sophie Souwer; Nicole Beukers	Netherlands	6:36.62
4	Daniela Schultze; Michaela Stälberg; Franziska Kampmann; Frieda Hämmerling	Germany	6:45.11
5	Kirstyn Goodger; Ruby Tew; Samantha Voss; Hannah Osborne	New Zealand	6:46.55
6	Jessica Leyden; Melissa Wilson; Mathilda Hodgkins-Byrne; Charlotte Hodgkins-Byrne	Great Britain	6:46.84
