= 2018 World Rowing Championships – Women's quadruple sculls =

Women's quadruple sculls at the 2018 World Rowing Championships
- Venue: Plovdiv Regatta Venue
- Location: Plovdiv, Bulgaria
- Dates: 9–15 September
- Competitors: 60 from 15 nations
- Winning time: 6:08.96

Medalists
gold medal	Agnieszka Kobus-Zawojska; Marta Wieliczko; Maria Springwald; Katarzyna Zillmann	Poland
silver medal	Marie-Cathérine Arnold; Carlotta Nwajide; Franziska Kampmann; Frieda Hämmerling	Germany
bronze medal	Olivia van Rooijen; Karolien Florijn; Sophie Souwer; Nicole Beukers	Netherlands

The women's quadruple sculls competition at the 2018 World Rowing Championships in Plovdiv took place at the Plovdiv Regatta Venue.

== Schedule ==
The schedule was as follows:

Date	Time	Round
Sunday 9 September 2018	16:51	Heats
Tuesday 11 September 2018	11:37	Repechage
Thursday 13 September 2018	12:48	Semifinals A/B
Saturday 15 September 2018	10:26	Final B
Saturday 15 September 2018	13:01	Final A
Saturday 15 September 2018	15:25	Final C

All times are Eastern European Summer Time (UTC+3)

== Results ==
=== Heats ===
The three fastest boats in each heat advanced directly to the A/B semifinals. The remaining boats were sent to the repechage.

==== Heat 1 ====
Rank	Rowers	Country	Time	Notes
1	Marie-Cathérine Arnold; Carlotta Nwajide; Franziska Kampmann; Frieda Hämmerling	Germany	6:17.90	SA/B
2	Mathilda Hodgkins-Byrne; Melissa Wilson; Jessica Leyden; Zoe Lee	Great Britain	6:20.04	SA/B
3	Elizabeth Sonshine; Emily Huelskamp; Maureen McAuliffe; Kara Soucek	United States	6:22.15	SA/B
4	Alena Schejbalová; Helena Hlasová; Miroslava Knapková; Lucie Žabová	Czech Republic	6:25.03	R
5	Vasilisa Stepanova; Olga Khalaleeva; Iuliia Volgina; Elena Zakhvatova	Russia	6:33.42	R

==== Heat 2 ====
Rank	Rowers	Country	Time	Notes
1	Zhang Ling; Wang Yuwei; Lü Yang; Cui Xiaotong	China	6:16.30	SA/B
2	Agnieszka Kobus-Zawojska; Marta Wieliczko; Maria Springwald; Katarzyna Zillmann	Poland	6:20.50	SA/B
3	Tatsiana Klimovich; Tatsiana Kukhta; Ekaterina Karsten; Krystina Staraselets	Belarus	6:26.05	SA/B
4	Ludovica Serafini; Carmela Pappalardo; Stefania Gobbi; Chiara Ondoli	Italy	6:31.70	R
5	Marianne Madsen; Hanna Inntjore; Thea Helseth; Inger Kavlie	Norway	6:33.80	R

==== Heat 3 ====
Rank	Rowers	Country	Time	Notes
1	Olivia van Rooijen; Karolien Florijn; Sophie Souwer; Nicole Beukers	Netherlands	6:17.72	SA/B
2	Genevieve Horton; Caitlin Cronin; Rowena Meredith; Olympia Aldersey	Australia	6:19.69	SA/B
3	Daryna Verkhohliad; Olena Buryak; Anastasiya Kozhenkova; Ievgeniia Dovhodko	Ukraine	6:20.37	SA/B
4	Elena Logofatu; Georgiana Vasile; Nicoleta Pascanu; Simona Geanina Radis	Romania	6:27.24	R
5	Marie Jacquet; Camille Juillet; Noémie Kober; Anne-Sophie Marzin	France	6:28.36	R

=== Repechage ===
The three fastest boats advanced to the A/B semifinals. The remaining boats were sent to the C final.

Rank	Rowers	Country	Time	Notes
1	Elena Logofatu; Georgiana Vasile; Nicoleta Pascanu; Simona Geanina Radis	Romania	6:18.92	SA/B
2	Vasilisa Stepanova; Olga Khalaleeva; Iuliia Volgina; Elena Zakhvatova	Russia	6:20.49	SA/B
3	Ludovica Serafini; Carmela Pappalardo; Stefania Gobbi; Chiara Ondoli	Italy	6:21.10	SA/B
4	Marie Jacquet; Camille Juillet; Noémie Kober; Anne-Sophie Marzin	France	6:22.52	FC
5	Alena Schejbalová; Helena Hlasová; Miroslava Knapková; Lucie Žabová	Czech Republic	6:23.27	FC
6	Marianne Madsen; Hanna Inntjore; Thea Helseth; Inger Kavlie	Norway	6:30.97	FC

=== Semifinals ===
The three fastest boats in each semi advanced to the A final. The remaining boats were sent to the B final.

==== Semifinal 1 ====
Rank	Rowers	Country	Time	Notes
1	Agnieszka Kobus-Zawojska; Marta Wieliczko; Maria Springwald; Katarzyna Zillmann	Poland	6:26.01	FA
2	Marie-Cathérine Arnold; Carlotta Nwajide; Franziska Kampmann; Frieda Hämmerling	Germany	6:28.84	FA
3	Olivia van Rooijen; Karolien Florijn; Sophie Souwer; Nicole Beukers	Netherlands	6:30.65	FA
4	Daryna Verkhohliad; Olena Buryak; Anastasiya Kozhenkova; Ievgeniia Dovhodko	Ukraine	6:34.28	FB
5	Ludovica Serafini; Carmela Pappalardo; Stefania Gobbi; Chiara Ondoli	Italy	6:43.97	FB
6	Vasilisa Stepanova; Olga Khalaleeva; Iuliia Volgina; Elena Zakhvatova	Russia	6:45.33	FB

==== Semifinal 2 ====
Rank	Rowers	Country	Time	Notes
1	Zhang Ling; Wang Yuwei; Lü Yang; Cui Xiaotong	China	6:26.49	FA
2	Mathilda Hodgkins-Byrne; Melissa Wilson; Jessica Leyden; Zoe Lee	Great Britain	6:29.03	FA
3	Elizabeth Sonshine; Emily Huelskamp; Maureen McAuliffe; Kara Soucek	United States	6:30.26	FA
4	Genevieve Horton; Caitlin Cronin; Rowena Meredith; Olympia Aldersey	Australia	6:31.44	FB
5	Tatsiana Klimovich; Tatsiana Kukhta; Ekaterina Karsten; Krystina Staraselets	Belarus	6:34.62	FB
6	Elena Logofatu; Georgiana Vasile; Nicoleta Pascanu; Simona Geanina Radis	Romania	6:35.43	FB

=== Finals ===
The A final determined the rankings for places 1 to 6. Additional rankings were determined in the other finals.

==== Final C ====
Rank	Rowers	Country	Time
1	Marie Jacquet; Camille Juillet; Noémie Kober; Anne-Sophie Marzin	France	6:21.62
2	Alena Schejbalová; Helena Hlasová; Miroslava Knapková; Lucie Žabová	Czech Republic	6:25.91
3	Marianne Madsen; Hanna Inntjore; Thea Helseth; Inger Kavlie	Norway	DNS

==== Final B ====
Rank	Rowers	Country	Time
1	Genevieve Horton; Caitlin Cronin; Rowena Meredith; Olympia Aldersey	Australia	6:19.55
2	Tatsiana Klimovich; Tatsiana Kukhta; Ekaterina Karsten; Krystina Staraselets	Belarus	6:22.33
3	Daryna Verkhohliad; Olena Buryak; Anastasiya Kozhenkova; Ievgeniia Dovhodko	Ukraine	6:22.49
4	Elena Logofatu; Georgiana Vasile; Nicoleta Pascanu; Simona Geanina Radis	Romania	6:28.35
5	Vasilisa Stepanova; Olga Khalaleeva; Iuliia Volgina; Elena Zakhvatova	Russia	6:33.90
6	Ludovica Serafini; Carmela Pappalardo; Stefania Gobbi; Chiara Ondoli	Italy	6:36.23

==== Final A ====
Rank	Rowers	Country	Time
1st place, gold medalist(s)	Agnieszka Kobus-Zawojska; Marta Wieliczko; Maria Springwald; Katarzyna Zillmann	Poland	6:08.96
2nd place, silver medalist(s)	Marie-Cathérine Arnold; Carlotta Nwajide; Franziska Kampmann; Frieda Hämmerling	Germany	6:11.42
3rd place, bronze medalist(s)	Olivia van Rooijen; Karolien Florijn; Sophie Souwer; Nicole Beukers	Netherlands	6:11.79
4	Zhang Ling; Wang Yuwei; Lü Yang; Cui Xiaotong	China	6:11.85
5	Mathilda Hodgkins-Byrne; Melissa Wilson; Jessica Leyden; Zoe Lee	Great Britain	6:16.45
6	Elizabeth Sonshine; Emily Huelskamp; Maureen McAuliffe; Kara Soucek	United States	6:18.15
