= 2020 European Rowing Championships =

Continental rowing championships

- Venue: Lake Malta
- Location: Poznań, Poland
- Dates: 9 to 11 October

The 2020 European Rowing Championships were held in Poznań, Poland from 9 to 11 October 2020.

== Medal summary ==
=== Men ===
Event	Gold	Time	Silver	Time	Bronze	Time
M1x	Sverri Sandberg Nielsen; Denmark	6:50.22	Natan Węgrzycki-Szymczyk; Poland	6:51.23	Kjetil Borch; Norway	6:51.63
M2-	Romania (ROU); Marius Cozmiuc; Ciprian Tudosă	6:26.52	Croatia (CRO); Martin Sinković; Valent Sinković	6:29.46	Italy (ITA); Matteo Lodo; Giuseppe Vicino	6:30.55
M2x	Netherlands (NED); Melvin Twellaar; Stef Broenink	6:18.690	Switzerland (SUI); Barnabé Delarze; Roman Röösli	6:20.790	Ireland (IRL); Daire Lynch; Ronan Byrne	6:21.280
M4-	Netherlands (NED); Jan van der Bij; Boudewijn Röell; Sander de Graaf; Nelson Ritsema	6:01.70	Italy (ITA); Marco Di Costanzo; Giovanni Abagnale; Bruno Rosetti; Matteo Castaldo	6:04.05	Poland (POL); Mateusz Wilangowski; Mikołaj Burda; Marcin Brzeziński; Michał Szpakowski	6:05.08
M4x	Netherlands (NED); Dirk Uittenbogaard; Abe Wiersma; Tone Wieten; Koen Metsemakers	5:39.44	Italy (ITA); Luca Chiumento; Simone Venier; Luca Rambaldi; Giacomo Gentili	5:43.88	Lithuania (LTU); Dovydas Nemeravičius; Martynas Džiaugys; Dominykas Jančionis; Aurimas Adomavičius	5:47.51
M8+	Germany (GER); Johannes Weißenfeld; Laurits Follert; Olaf Roggensack; Torben Johannesen; Jakob Schneider; Malte Jakschik; Richard Schmidt; Hannes Ocik; Martin Sauer (c)	5:31,15	Romania (ROU); Alexandru Chioseaua; Florin Lehaci; Constantin Radu; Sergiu Bejan; Vlad Dragoș Aicoboae; Constantin Adam; Florin Arteni; Ciprian Huc; Adrian Munteanu (c)	5:32,93	Netherlands (NED); Bjorn van den Ende; Ruben Knab; Kaj Hendriks; Simon van Dorp; Jasper Tissen; Bram Schwarz; Mechiel Versluis; Robert Lücken; Aranka Kops (c)	5:34,21
Men's lightweight events
LM1x	Kristoffer Brun; Norway	6:58.750	Niels Torre; Italy	6:59.110	Fintan McCarthy; Ireland	7:02.150
LM2x	Italy (ITA); Stefano Oppo; Pietro Ruta	6:22.80	Germany (GER); Jonathan Rommelmann; Jason Osborne	6:22.93	Belgium (BEL); Niels Van Zandweghe; Tim Brys	6:23.77
LM4x	Italy (ITA); Catello Amarante; Antonio Vicino; Patrick Rocek; Gabriel Soares	6:01.01	Germany (GER); Julian Schneider; Eric Magnus Paul; Jonathan Schreiber; Joachim Agne	6:04.49	Austria (AUT); Alexander Maderner; Lukas Kreitmeier; Sebastian Kabas; Philipp Kellner	6:10.12
Men's para-rowing events
PR1 M1x	Roman Polianskyi; Ukraine	9:34.540	Aleksey Chuvashev; Russia	9:47.830	Marcus Klemp; Germany	9:59.420

=== Women ===
Event	Gold	Time	Silver	Time	Bronze	Time
W1x	Sanita Pušpure; Ireland	7:36.04	Magdalena Lobnig; Austria	7:38.46	Anneta Kyridou; Greece	7:39.97
W2-	Romania (ROU); Adriana Ailincai; Iuliana Buhuș	7:17.19	Spain (ESP); Aina Cid; Virginia Díaz Rivas	7:18.82	Greece (GRE); Maria Kyridou; Christina Bourmpou	7:20.24
W2x	Romania (ROU); Nicoleta-Ancuţa Bodnar; Simona Radiș	6:57.86	Netherlands (NED); Roos de Jong; Lisa Scheenaard	7:03.47	France (FRA); Hélène Lefebvre; Élodie Ravera-Scaramozzino	7:05.05
W4-	Netherlands (NED); Ellen Hogerwerf; Karolien Florijn; Ymkje Clevering; Veronique Meester	6:35,49	Italy (ITA); Aisha Rocek; Kiri Tontodonati; Alessandra Patelli; Chiara Ondoli	6:40,84	Ireland (IRL); Aifric Keogh; Eimear Lambe; Aileen Crowley; Fiona Murtagh	6:41,21
W4x	Netherlands (NED); Laila Youssifou; Inge Janssen; Olivia van Rooijen; Nicole Beukers	6:25,66	Germany (GER); Daniela Schultze; Carlotta Nwajide; Frieda Hämmerling; Franziska Kampmann	6:26,75	Poland (POL); Katarzyna Boruch; Marta Wieliczko; Agnieszka Kobus-Zawojska; Katarzyna Zillmann	6:27,87
W8+	Romania (ROU); Maria-Magdalena Rusu; Viviana Bejinariu; Georgiana Dedu; Amalia Bereș; Ioana Vrînceanu; Maria Tivodariu; Mădălina Bereș; Denisa Tîlvescu; Daniela Druncea (c)	6:14,75	Germany (GER); Sophie Oksche; Melanie Göldner; Anna Härtl; Alexandra Höffgen; Alyssa Meyer; Frauke Hundeling; Marie-Cathérine Arnold; Tabea Schendekehl; Larina Hillemann (c)	6:16,95	Netherlands (NED); Elsbeth Beeres; Maartje Damen; Dieuwertje den Besten; Tessa Dullemans; Hermijntje Drenth; Tinka Offereins; Aletta Jorritsma; Karien Robbers; Dieuwke Fetter (c)	6:17,38
Women's lightweight events
LW1x	Martine Veldhuis; Netherlands	7:48.950	Sofia Meakin; Switzerland	7:50.030	Paola Piazzolla; Italy	7:52.380
LW2x	Netherlands (NED); Marieke Keijser; Ilse Paulis	6:58.07	Italy (ITA); Valentina Rodini; Federica Cesarini	6:59.80	Romania (ROU); Ionela-Livia Cozmiuc; Gianina Beleagă	7:00.60
LW4x	Italy (ITA); Giulia Mignemi; Silvia Crosio; Greta Martinelli; Arianna Noseda	6:37,90	Germany (GER); Elisabeth Mainz; Marion Reichardt; Cosima Clotten; Katrin Volk	6:44,51	Not Awarded	
Women's para-rowing events
PR1 W1x	Nathalie Benoit; France	10:51.680	Anna Sheremet; Ukraine	11:02.170	Sylvia Pille-Steppat; Germany	11:17.900

=== Mixed para-events ===
Event	Gold	Time	Silver	Time	Bronze	Time
PR2 Mix2x	Netherlands (NED); Annika van der Meer; Corné de Koning	8:19.770	Ukraine (UKR); Svitlana Bohuslavska; Iaroslav Koiuda	8:26.550	Poland (POL); Jolanta Majka; Michal Gadowski	8:29.030
PR3 Mix4+	Italy (ITA); Cristina Scazzosi; Alessandro Brancato; Lorenzo Bernard; Greta Muti; Lorena Fuina (c)	7:19.670	Ukraine (UKR); Alexandra Polianska; Dariia Kotyk; Stanislav Samoliuk; Maksym Zhuk; Yuliia Malasay (c)	7:22.830	France (FRA); Guylaine Marchand; Margot Boulet; Rémy Taranto; Antoine Jesel; Robin Le Barreu (c)	7:24.430

== Medal table ==
* Host nation (Poland)

Rank	Nation	Gold	Silver	Bronze	Total
1	Netherlands	8	1	2	11
2	Italy	4	5	2	11
3	Romania	4	1	1	6
4	Germany	1	5	2	8
5	Ukraine	1	3	0	4
6	Ireland	1	0	3	4
7	France	1	0	2	3
8	Norway	1	0	1	2
9	Denmark	1	0	0	1
10	Switzerland	0	2	0	2
11	Poland*	0	1	3	4
12	Austria	0	1	1	2
13	Croatia	0	1	0	1
13	Russia	0	1	0	1
13	Spain	0	1	0	1
16	Greece	0	0	2	2
17	Belgium	0	0	1	1
17	Lithuania	0	0	1	1
Totals (18 entries)		22	22	21	65
