= 2017 World Rowing Championships – Women's quadruple sculls =

Women's quadruple sculls at the 2017 World Rowing Championships
- Venue: Nathan Benderson Park
- Location: Sarasota, United States
- Dates: 24–30 September
- Competitors: 36 from 9 nations
- Winning time: 6:16.72

Medalists
gold medal	Olivia van Rooijen; Inge Janssen; Sophie Souwer; Nicole Beukers	Netherlands
silver medal	Agnieszka Kobus; Marta Wieliczko; Maria Springwald; Katarzyna Zillmann	Poland
bronze medal	Bethany Bryan; Mathilda Hodgkins-Byrne; Jessica Leyden; Holly Nixon	Great Britain

The women's quadruple sculls competition at the 2017 World Rowing Championships in Sarasota took place in Nathan Benderson Park.

== Schedule ==
The schedule was as follows:

Date	Time	Round
Sunday 24 September 2017	12:26	Heats
Tuesday 26 September 2017	13:15	Repechage
Saturday 30 September 2017	09:30	Final B
Saturday 30 September 2017	11:53	Final A

All times are Eastern Daylight Time (UTC−4)

== Results ==
=== Heats ===
The two fastest boats in each heat advanced directly to the A final. The remaining boats were sent to the repechage.

==== Heat 1 ====
Rank	Rowers	Country	Time	Notes
1	Agnieszka Kobus; Marta Wieliczko; Maria Springwald; Katarzyna Zillmann	Poland	6:26.73	FA
2	Bethany Bryan; Mathilda Hodgkins-Byrne; Jessica Leyden; Holly Nixon	Great Britain	6:27.87	FA
3	Elizabeth Sonshine; Maureen McAuliffe; Kara Kohler; Emily Huelskamp	United States	6:27.88	R
4	Daniela Schultze; Charlotte Reinhardt; Frauke Hundeling; Frieda Hämmerling	Germany	6:33.68	R
5	Jiang Yan; Li Jingjing; Zhang Ling; Zhang Xinyue	China	6:33.95	R

==== Heat 2 ====
Rank	Rowers	Country	Time	Notes
1	Olivia van Rooijen; Inge Janssen; Sophie Souwer; Nicole Beukers	Netherlands	6:28.30	FA
2	Leah Saunders; Genevieve Horton; Rowena Meredith; Caitlin Cronin	Australia	6:30.05	FA
3	Daryna Verkhohliad; Diana Dymchenko; Anastasiya Kozhenkova; Ievgeniia Nimchenko	Ukraine	6:32.09	R
4	Julie Voirin; Margaux Bailleul; Noémie Kober; Marie Le Nepvou	France	6:44.81	R

=== Repechage ===
The two fastest boats advanced to the A final. The remaining boats were sent to the B final.

Rank	Rowers	Country	Time	Notes
1	Elizabeth Sonshine; Maureen McAuliffe; Kara Kohler; Emily Huelskamp	United States	6:19.73	FA
2	Daniela Schultze; Charlotte Reinhardt; Frauke Hundeling; Frieda Hämmerling	Germany	6:21.64	FA
3	Jiang Yan; Li Jingjing; Zhang Ling; Zhang Xinyue	China	6:27.38	FB
4	Daryna Verkhohliad; Diana Dymchenko; Anastasiya Kozhenkova; Ievgeniia Nimchenko	Ukraine	6:30.65	FB
5	Julie Voirin; Margaux Bailleul; Noémie Kober; Marie Le Nepvou	France	6:33.62	FB

=== Finals ===
The A final determined the rankings for places 1 to 6. Additional rankings were determined in the B final.

==== Final B ====
Rank	Rowers	Country	Time
1	Jiang Yan; Li Jingjing; Zhang Ling; Zhang Xinyue	China	6:25.47
2	Daryna Verkhohliad; Diana Dymchenko; Anastasiya Kozhenkova; Ievgeniia Nimchenko	Ukraine	6:27.92
3	Julie Voirin; Margaux Bailleul; Noémie Kober; Marie Le Nepvou	France	6:31.73

==== Final A ====
Rank	Rowers	Country	Time
1st place, gold medalist(s)	Olivia van Rooijen; Inge Janssen; Sophie Souwer; Nicole Beukers	Netherlands	6:16.72
2nd place, silver medalist(s)	Agnieszka Kobus; Marta Wieliczko; Maria Springwald; Katarzyna Zillmann	Poland	6:17.71
3rd place, bronze medalist(s)	Bethany Bryan; Mathilda Hodgkins-Byrne; Jessica Leyden; Holly Nixon	Great Britain	6:19.93
4	Daniela Schultze; Charlotte Reinhardt; Frauke Hundeling; Frieda Hämmerling	Germany	6:21.56
5	Elizabeth Sonshine; Maureen McAuliffe; Kara Kohler; Emily Huelskamp	United States	6:22.06
6	Leah Saunders; Genevieve Horton; Rowena Meredith; Caitlin Cronin	Australia	6:24.25
