= Poland at the 2018 European Championships =

- IOC code: POL

in (United Kingdom) Glasgow (Germany) Berlin 2 August 2018 – 12 August 2018
- Competitors: 208 in 7 sports
- Medals Ranked 7th: Gold 9 Silver 6 Bronze 6 Total 21

European Championships appearances
- 2018; 2022

Poland competed at the inaugural 7 sports 2018 European Championships from 2 to 12 August 2018. It competed in all sports.

== Medallists ==
Medal	Name	Sport	Event	Date
Gold	Agnieszka Kobus; Maria Springwald; Marta Wieliczko; Katarzyna Zillmann	Rowing	Women's quadruple sculls	4 August
Gold	Wojciech Pszczolarski	Cycling	Men's points race	5 August
Gold	Wojciech Nowicki	Athletics	Men's hammer throw	7 August
Gold	Michał Haratyk	Athletics	Men's shot put	7 August
Gold	Paulina Guba	Athletics	Women's shot put	8 August
Gold	Justyna Święty-Ersetic	Athletics	Women's 400 metres	11 August
Gold	Adam Kszczot	Athletics	Men's 800 metres	11 August
Gold	Iga Baumgart-Witan; Martyna Dąbrowska; Małgorzata Hołub-Kowalik; Natalia Kaczmarek; Justyna Święty-Ersetic; Patrycja Wyciszkiewicz	Athletics	Women's 4 × 400 metres relay	11 August
Gold	Anita Włodarczyk	Athletics	Women's hammer throw	12 August
Silver	Weronika Deresz; Joanna Dorociak	Rowing	Women's lightweight double sculls	5 August
Silver	Paweł Fajdek	Athletics	Men's hammer throw	7 August
Silver	Konrad Bukowiecki	Athletics	Men's shot put	7 August
Silver	Radosław Kawęcki	Swimming	Men's 200 metre backstroke	8 August
Silver	Marcin Lewandowski	Athletics	Men's 1500 metres	10 August
Silver	Sofia Ennaoui	Athletics	Women's 1500 metres	12 August
Bronze	Konrad Czerniak; Jan Hołub; Jakub Kraska; Kacper Majchrzak; Jan Świtkowski	Swimming	Men's 4 × 100 metre freestyle relay	3 August
Bronze	Monika Chabel; Joanna Dittmann; Olga Michałkiewicz; Maria Wierzbowska	Rowing	Women's coxless four	4 August
Bronze	Wiktor Chabel; Dominik Czaja; Szymon Pośnik; Maciej Zawojski	Rowing	Men's quadruple sculls	4 August
Bronze	Justyna Kaczkowska	Cycling	Women's individual pursuit	4 August
Bronze	Szymon Krawczyk	Cycling	Men's elimination race	7 August
Bronze	Joanna Fiodorow	Athletics	Women's hammer throw	12 August
