= 2016 British Rowing Senior Championships =

- Venue: National Water Sports Centre
- Location: Holme Pierrepont (Nottingham)
- Dates: 22–23 October 2016

The 2016 British Rowing Senior Championships were the 45th edition of the National Senior Championships, held from 22–23 October 2016 at the National Water Sports Centre in Holme Pierrepont, Nottingham. They were organised and sanctioned by British Rowing, and are open to British rowers.

== Medal summary ==
| Event | Gold | Silver | Bronze |
|---|---|---|---|
| Victor Ludorum | Leander | n/a | n/a |
| Open 2x | Leander A Nick Middleton & Tom Barras | Leander B Harry Leask & Andy Joel | Edinburgh University; Graham Ord & Josh Armstrong |
| Open 4- | Isis A Oliver Cook, Michael di Santo, Olivier Siegelaar, Jørgen Tveit | Leander; Callum McBrierty, Barnaby Stentiford, Cameron Buchan, Matthew Rossiter | Isis B Jake Cushnie, James White, William Warr, Josh Bugajski |
| Open 4x | Leander B Edward Fisher, Charles Waite-Roberts, Jonny Jackson, Sam Mottram | Leander A Harry Leask, Frazier Christie, Harry Glenister, Andy Joel | Edinburgh University; Matt Curtis, Graham Ord, Josh Armstrong, Gavin Horsburgh |
| Open 8+ | Leander A Richard Clarke, Sam Arnot, Jacob Dawson, Adam Neill, Sam Twine, George Rossiter, Tim Clarke, Tom Ford, Sam Royston (cox) | Oxford Brookes University; Peter Chambers, Jamie Copus, Rory Gibbs, Matthew Aldridge, Matt Tarrant, Scott Durant, Henry Swarbrick, Joel Cassells, Rory Copus (cox) | Leander B Iain Mandale, Callum Johnson, Francis Highton, Finn Stevenson, Tom Jeffery, Edward Gleadowe, James Scott, George Hallewell, Vlad Saigau (cox) |
| Women 2x | Wallingford; Brianna Stubbs & Eleanor Piggott | London University; Robyn Hart-Winks & Emily Craig | Reading University / Reading; Mathilda Hodgkins-Byrne & Laura Meridew |
| Women 4x | Leander A Lucy Burgess, Emily Carmichael, Holly Nixon, Jess Leyden | Tideway Scullers School; Amelia Carlton, Katie Wilkinson-Feller, Georgina Grandfield, Fran Rawlins | Edinburgh University; Alex Rankin, Mairi Buchan, Anne Rodahl, Maddie Arlett |
| Women 4- | Cambridge University; Myriam Goudet, Alice White, Lucy Pike, Melissa Wilson | London University; Lottie Bruce, Charlotte Hodgkins-Byrne, Georgia Statham, Alessandra French | Cambridge University; Imogen Grant, Karolina Farr, Patricia Smith, Oonagh Cousins |
| Women 8+ | Leander; Fiona Gammond, Emma Spruce, Josephine Wratten, Madeline Badcott, Beth Bryan, Katherine Douglas, Karen Bennett, Holly Norton, Erin Wysocki-Jones (cox) | Cambridge University; Myriam Goudet, Melissa Wilson, Lucy Pike, Oonagh Cousins, Imogen Grant, Karolina Farr, Patricia Smith, Alice White, Matthew Holland (cox) | London University; Robyn Hart-Winks, Fionnuala Gannon, Catherine Ador, Emma Reiser, Sara Parfett, Charlotte Hodgkins-Byrne, Georgia Statham, Alessandra French, Matilda Horn (cox) |

Key
| Symbol | meaning |
|---|---|
| 1, 2, 4, 8 | crew size |
| + | coxed |
| - | coxless |
| x | sculls |
