= 2016 World Rowing U23 Championships =

Rowing event

- Venue: Willem-Alexander Baan
- Location: Rotterdam, Netherlands
- Dates: 21–26 August

The 12th World Rowing U23 Championships was held from 21 to 26 August 2016 at the Willem-Alexander Baan in Rotterdam, Netherlands in conjunction with the World Junior Rowing Championships and the World Rowing Championships. The annual rowing regatta is organized by FISA (the International Rowing Federation), and held at the end of the northern hemisphere summer.

== Medal summary ==
=== Men's events ===
Event	Gold		Silver		Bronze	
BLM1x	Niels Van Zandweghe; Belgium	07:31.96	Jonathan Rommelmann; Germany	07:32.85	Alexis López; Mexico	07:37.80
BLM2-	Switzerland; Fiorin Rüedi; Joel Schürch	06:26.47	Greece; Stefanos Douskos; Ioannis Petrou	06:29.25	Turkey; Mert Kaan Kartal; Fatih Ünsal	06:30.92
BLM2x	Spain; Adrià Mitjavila; Rodrigo Conde	06:52.31	Italy; Antonio Vicino; Lorenzo Galano	06:54.70	France; Benjamin David; Adrian Constantini	06:58.27
BLM4-	Italy; Alberto Di Seyssel; Stefano Oppo; Piero Sfiligoi; Paolo Di Girolamo	06:19.29	Germany; Hendrik Kaltenborn; Fabio De Oliveira; Felix Brummel; Alexander Kevin Diedrich	06:21.49	Great Britain; Edward Fisher; Benjamin Reeves; Jonathan Jackson; Alastair Douglass	06:25.22
BLM4x	Great Britain; Hugo Coussens; Oliver Varley; Matthew Curtis; Gavin Horsburgh	05:53.15	Germany; Julian Schneider; Elias Dreismickenbecker; Jonas Felix Weller; Philipp Grebner	05:54.68	Italy; Alfonso Scalzone; Edoardo Buoli; Davide Magni; Gabriel Soares	05:54.74
BM1x	Tim Ole Naske; Germany	07:23.37	Natan Węgrzycki-Szymczyk; Poland	07:26.21	Michal Plocek; Czech Republic	07:28.25
BM2-	Serbia; Viktor Pivač; Martin Mačković	06:58.01	France; Romuald Thomas; Raphaël Lescieux	06:59.44	United States; Jovanni Stefani; Brennan Wertz	07:02.04
BM2x	Germany; Max Appel; Philipp Syring	06:40.81	Norway; Martin Helseth; Erik André Solbakken	06:41.81	Netherlands; Amos Keijser; Abe Wiersma	06:44.00
BM4-	Austria; Florian Walk; Gabriel Hohensasser; Christoph Seifriedberger; Ferdinand Querfeld	05:50.20	Great Britain; James Johnston; Thomas George; James Rudkin; Lewis McCue	05:50.60	New Zealand; James Mcanallen; Thomas Clyma; Hugo Elworthy; Thomas Jenkins	05:53.90
BM4+	New Zealand; Martin O'Leary; Cameron Webster; Charles Rogerson; Phillip Wilson; Sam Bosworth	06:08.50	Italy; Raffaele Giulivo; Filippo Mondelli; Leonardo Calabrese; Leonardo Pietra Caprina; Giorgio Crippa	06:09.34	Australia; Jack Cleary; Texas Lawton; Sam Hardy; Henry Youl; Louis Copolov	06:09.93
BM4x	Australia; Robert Black; Caleb Antill; Luke Letcher; Thomas Schramko	06:07.51	New Zealand; Jordan Parry; Cameron Crampton; Oliver Stephens; Jack O'Leary	06:07.97	Italy; Ivan Capuano; Luca Rambaldi; Emanuele Fiume; Giacomo Gentili	06:08.97
BM8+	Netherlands; Michiel Oyen; Nelson Ritsema; Michiel Mantel; Jaap Scholten; Maarten Hurkmans; Simon van Dorp; Lex van den Herik; Max Ponsen; Diederick van Engelenburg	05:54.10	Great Britain; Calum Irvine; Oliver Wynne-Griffith; Matthew Benstead; Timothy Livingstone; David Bewicke-Copley; Sholto Carnegie; Robert Hurn; Arthur Doyle; Ian Middleton	05:57.26	Germany; Malte Daberkow; Jakob Schneider; Malte Grossmann; Finn Knüppel; Christopher Reinhardt; Laurits Follert; Jacob Schulte-Bockholt; Marc Leske; Jonas Wiesen	05:59.23

=== Women's events ===
Event	Gold		Silver		Bronze	
BLW1x	Marieke Keijser; Netherlands	08:16.14	Nicole van Wyk; South Africa	08:27.18	Kenia Lechuga Alanis; Mexico	08:32.74
BLW2x	Netherlands; Amber Kraak; Anne-Marie Schonk	07:30.32	New Zealand; Lucy Jonas; Jackie Kiddle	07:32.27	Italy; Federica Cesarini; Valentina Rodini	07:33.85
BLW4x	Italy; Paola Piazzolla; Asja Maregotto; Allegra Francalacci; Giorgia Lo Bue	06:27.28	Switzerland; Lara Eichenberger; Fabienne Schweizer; Serafina Merloni; Pauline Delacroix	06:29.04	Germany; Sophia Krause; Samantha Nesajda; Kathrin Morbe; Leonie Neuhaus	06:34.64
BW1x	Ieva Adomavičiūtė; Lithuania	08:20.49	Lovisa Claesson; Sweden	08:23.90	Carlotta Nwajide; Germany	08:26.38
BW2-	Canada; Hillary Janssens; Nicole Hare	07:07.49	Italy; Carmela Pappalardo; Ludovica Serafini	07:09.84	Russia; Kira Yuvchenko; Elizaveta Kornienko	07:10.30
BW2x	Great Britain; Mathilda Hodgkins-Byrne; Jess Leyden	07:23.46	Belarus; Tatsiana Klimovich; Krystina Staraselets	07:29.260	Romania; Bejinariu Viviana-Iuliana; Ioana Vrînceanu	07:31.22
BW4-	United States; Kendall Brewer; Gia Doonan; Regina Salmons; Sarah Dougherty	06:27.28	Romania; Ana-Maria Simion; Alina Ligia Pop; Madalina Heghes; Diana Mihai	06:32.94	Netherlands; Hermijntje Drenth; Eline Feitsma; Ymkje Clevering; Veronique Meester	06:33.53
BW4x	Poland; Marta Wieliczko; Krystyna Lemanczyk; Olga Michalkiewicz; Katarzyna Zillmann	06:19.10	Germany; Frauke Hundeling; Anne Beenken; Juliane Faralisch; Michaela Staelberg	06:20.22	France; Laura Tarantola; Camille Juillet; Marie Jacquet; Anne-Sophie Marzin	06:21.20
BW8+	United States; Erin Briggs; Cassandra Johnson; Kendall Brewer; Gia Doonan; Regina Salmons; Sarah Dougherty; Georgia Ratcliff; Kendall Chase; Colette Lucas-Conwell	06:36.90	Great Britain; Charlotte Hodgkins-Byrne; Alice Bowyer; Emily Ford; Chloe Brew; Holly Hill; Madeline Badcott; Anna Thornton; Heidi Long; Sasha Adwani	06:44.06	Russia; Yana Tolstokorova; Anna Korenkova; Olga Nesterenko; Elena Oriabinskaia; Ekaterina Sevostianova; Anna Karpova; Anna Aksenova; Valentina Plaksina; Ekaterina Kopaeva	06:45.50

== See also ==
- Rowing at the 2016 Summer Olympics
- 2016 World Rowing Championships
- World Rowing Junior Championships 2016
