= Inge Janssen =

Dutch rower (born 1989)

Personal information
- Nationality: Dutch
- Born: 20 April 1989 (age 37) Voorburg, Netherlands
- Height: 1.82 m (6 ft 0 in)
- Weight: 71 kg (157 lb)

Sport
- Country: Netherlands
- Sport: Rowing
- Event(s): Single sculls, Double sculls, Quadruple sculls
Medal record
Women's rowing
Representing the Netherlands
Olympic Games
Silver medal – second place	2016 Rio de Janeiro	Quadruple sculls
World Championships
Gold medal – first place	2017 Sarasota	Quadruple sculls
Bronze medal – third place	2015 Aiguebelette	Quadruple sculls
Bronze medal – third place	2019 Ottensheim	Quadruple sculls
European Championships
Silver medal – second place	2015 Poznań	Quadruple sculls
Silver medal – second place	2017 Račice	Quadruple sculls
Silver medal – second place	2019 Lucerne	Quadruple sculls
Bronze medal – third place	2013 Seville	Single sculls
Bronze medal – third place	2014 Belgrade	Double sculls

Inge Janssen (born 20 April 1989) is a Dutch rower. A world champion in the women's four, she was part of the Dutch quadruple sculls that won silver at the 2016 Olympics and competed in the double sculls at the 2012 Summer Olympics.

She is a 2010 graduate from the University of Virginia.

== Career ==
At the 2011 World Under 23 Championship, she won bronze with Ellen Hogerwerf.

At the 2013 European Championships, Janssen won bronze in the women's single sculls, while at the 2014 European Championships, she won the bronze in the women's double sculls with Nicole Beukers.

Between 2014 and 2015, Janssen switched to the quadruple sculls.

In 2015, Janssen, Chantal Achterberg, Nicole Beukers and Carline Bouw won bronze at the World Championships and silver at the European Championships.

At the 2016 Olympics, Janssen, Chantal Achterberg, Nicole Beukers and Carline Bouw won silver in the women's quadruple sculls.

She won the women's quadruple sculls at the 2017 World Championship with Olivia van Rooijen, Sophie Souwer and Nicole Beukers. That year, the team also won European silver.
