= 2015 World Rowing Junior Championships =

- Venue: Rodrigo de Freitas Lagoon
- Location: Rio de Janeiro, Brazil
- Dates: 5–8 August

The 49th World Rowing Junior Championships were held from 5 to 8 August 2015 at the Rodrigo de Freitas Lagoon in Rio de Janeiro, Brazil.

== Medal summary ==
=== Men's events ===
| Event | Gold | | Silver | | Bronze | |
|---|---|---|---|---|---|---|
| Single scull (JM1x) | Giacomo Gentili; Italy | 7:05.77 | Henrik Runge; Germany | 7:08.78 | Adam Bakker; Australia | 7:08.80 |
| Coxless pair (JM2-) | Germany; Olaf Roggensack; René Schmela | 6:48.49 | Romania; Constantin Cristi Hîrgău; Alexandru Chioseaua | 6:48.74 | Greece; Georgios Papasakelariou; Konstantinos Mantzios | 6:51.72 |
| Double scull (JM2x) | Italy; Andrea Cattaneo; Emanuele Fiume | 6:36.13 | Germany; Johannes Lotz; David Junge | 6:38.19 | Hungary; Kristof Acs; Maté Bacskai | 6:39.83 |
| Coxless four (JM4-) | Romania; Alexandru Matincă; Cosmin Pascari; Mihai Ianos; Ciprian Tudosă | 6:17.20 | Great Britain; Thomas Digby; Charles Elwes; Luke Towers; Jonathan Naylor | 6:19.39 | Germany; Lukas Geller; Christopher Reinhardt; Johannes Rentz; Lukas Föbinger | 6:19.65 |
| Coxed four (JM4+) | Germany; Michel Zoerb; Jan Ole Muchow; Jan Hennecke; Marcus Elster; Hans William Espig (cox) | 6:41.51 | Italy; Dario Favilli; Andrea Benetti; Riccardo Peretti; Leonardo Pietra Caprina; Francesco Tassia (cox) | 6:43.96 | Turkey; Harun Ardıç; Gökhan Güven; Aydın İnanç Şahin; İsmail Ali Bekiroğlu; Sarp Taner Sümer (cox) | 6:45.41 |
| Quad scull (JM4x) | Great Britain; Gavin Horsburgh; Joshua Armstrong; Samuel Meijer; Chris Lawrie | 6:05.36 | Germany; Anton Finger; Marc Weber; Ernst-Albrecht Boy; Jacob Raillon | 6:07.31 | Ukraine; Yehven Aleksandrov; Vladyslav Hysar; Pavlo Yurchenko; Denis Kryvulia | 6:08.73 |
| Eight (JM8+) | Netherlands; Ralf Rienks; Bart Roovers; Michiel Mantel; Koen van den Herik; Maarten Hurkmans; Simon van Dorp; Jaap de Jong; Bram Schwarz; Just Ponsen (cox) | 5:51.74 | United States; James Palmer; Justin Best; Andrew Gaard; Charles Watt; Ethan Seder; Cameron Chater; Hunter Johnson; Mark Levinson; Ethan Ruiz (cox) | 5:53.89 | Germany; Friedrich Dunkel; Nils Kocher; Johannes Fischer; Benjamin Leibelt; Lars Lorch; Marc Kammann; Lars Höpken; Max Reichel; Philipp Baumgard (cox) | 5:54.28 |

=== Women's events ===
| Event | Gold | | Silver | | Bronze | |
|---|---|---|---|---|---|---|
| JW1x | Marieke Keijser; Netherlands | 7:49.76 | Sofia Asoumanaki; Greece | 7:58.10 | Desislava Georgieva; Bulgaria | 8:01.35 |
| JW2- | Russia; Olesia Zakharova; Ekaterina Glazkova | 7:39.76 | Chile; Melita Abraham; Antonia Abraham | 7:41.64 | United States; Arianna Lee; Margaret Dawson | 7:42.52 |
| JW2x | Germany; Annemieke Schanze; Frieda Hämmerling | 7:32.58 | Romania; Elena Logofătu; Nicoleta Pașcanu | 7:38.65 | Italy; Valentina Iseppi; Allegra Francalacci | 7:40.00 |
| JW4- | United States; Katy Gillingham; Marlee Blue; Dana Moffat; Kaitlyn Kynast | 7:09.04 | Germany; Paula Vosgerau; Bea Bliemel; Charlotte Zeiz; Leah Labudde | 7:10.19 | New Zealand; Ella Greenslade; Lucy Hutchinson; Finau Mosa'ati-Fosita; Anahera Nin | 7:20.46 |
| JW4x | Germany; Lena Reuß; Katharina Börms; Franziska Kampmann; Laura Kampmann | 6:46.87 | Great Britain; Susannah Duncan; Kyra Edwards; Molly Harding; Anna Thornton | 6:50.31 | United States; Meghan Gutknecht; Emily Delleman; Elizabeth Sharis; Emily Kallfelz | 6:52.58 |
| JW8+ | Germany; Marieluise Witting; Janina Arndt; Christina Berchtold; Ella Cosack; Isabelle Hübener; Carolin Doerfler; Franziska Ott; Carolin Dold; Lynn Artinger (cox) | 6:39.79 | Italy; Beatrice Millo; Ottavia Ravoni; Ludovica Braglia; Benedetta Faravelli; Angelica Merlini; Elisa Mondelli; Claudia Destefani; Lara Maule; Camilla Mariani (cox) | 6:43.22 | United States; Sarah Ondak; Mariko Kelly; Abigail Tarquino; Kailani Marchak; India Robinson; Julia Cornacchia; Lindsay Noah; Shayla Lamb; Audrey Malzahn (cox) | 6:43.80 |

== See also ==
- 2015 World Rowing Championships
- 2015 World Rowing U23 Championships
