= 2012 World Rowing Junior Championships =

- Location: Plovdiv, Bulgaria
- Dates: 15–19 August

The 46th World Rowing Junior Championships were held from 15 to 19 August 2012 in Plovdiv, Bulgaria, concurrently with the World Rowing Senior Championships.

== Medal summary ==
=== Men's events ===
Event	Gold		Silver		Bronze	
Single scull (JM1x)	Michal Plocek; Czech Republic	7:03.47	Jernej Markovc; Slovenia	7:09.01	Ganggang Li; China	7:10.60
Coxless pair (JM2-)	Romania; Neculai Aniculesei; Dumitru Mariuc	6:47.71	Greece; Michail Kouskouridas; Athanasios Tsialios	6:49.51	Serbia; Igor Lončarević; Andrija Šljukić	6:50.99
Double scull (JM2x)	Germany; Kai Fuhrmann; Ole Daberkow	6:32.96	Latvia; Kriss Kalnins; Gints Zunde	6:35.31	Switzerland; Damien Tollardo; Barnabé Delarze	6:37.88
Coxless four (JM4-)	Italy; Stefano Oppo; Alberto Di Seyssel; Lorenzo Pietra Caprina; Paolo Di Girolamo	6:12.43	Romania; Pavel-Iulian Buiciac; Alexandru-Cosmin Macovei; Danut-Viorel Rusu; Cristian Ivascu	6:12.44	Germany; Leonard Stellberg; Jakob Schneider; Johannes Weißenfeld; Alexander Usen	6:14.98
Coxed four (JM4+)	New Zealand; Thomas Murray; Michael Brake; Cameron Webster; Thomas Jenkins; Sam Bosworth (cox)	6:26.67	Germany; Thomas Matzat; Leonard Schmitz; Ole Schwiethal; Max Backmann; Sebastian Müller (cox)	6:28.92	Serbia; Bojan Došljak; Aleksandar Marinkovski; Aleksandar Beđik; Aleksa Stankovic; Mateja Josic (cox)	6:30.02
Quad scull (JM4x)	Italy; Davide Mumolo; Andrea Crippa; Tiziano Evangelisti; Luca Rambaldi	5:54.34	Ukraine; Mykila Mazur; Vladyslav Gavrylyuk; Heorhii Verteletskyi; Roman Matviychuk	5:57.22	Romania; Marian Enache; Nicu-Ionut Bocancea; Laurentiu-Marian Colceag; Florin-Aurelian Buznean	5:58.83
Eight (JM8+)	Italy; Guglielmo Carcano; Matteo Borsini; Giovanni Abagnale; Niccolo Pagani; Luca Lovisolo; Pietro Zileri; Matteo Lodo; Alessandro Mansutti; Enrico D'Aniello (cox)	5:47.84	Germany; Frederic Aurin; Maximilian Korge; Theo Kessner; Matthias Hörnschemeyer; Til-Malte Wodrich; Malte Daberkow; Jan Kruppa; Finn Knüppel; Florian Harsdorff (cox)	5:49.55	Great Britain; Charles Shaw; Titus Morley; Eduardo Munno; Thomas George; Callum Jones; Oliver Wynne-Griffith; Matthew Benstead; Thomas Marshall; Edward Henshaw (cox)	5:50.16

=== Women's events ===
Event	Gold		Silver		Bronze	
JW1x	Anne Beenken; Germany	7:55.52	Jenienne Curr; South Africa	7:59.48	Laura Oprea; Romania	8:04.25
JW2-	Italy; Serena Lo Bue; Giorgia Lo Bue	7:42.46	United States; Christine Cavallo; Kathryn Brown	7:47.32	Greece; Styliani Koumpli; Aikaterini Kalamara	7:49.51
JW2x	Lithuania; Milda Valčiukaitė; Ieva Adomavičiūtė	7:18.80	Romania; Ionela Cozmiuc; Andreea Asoltanei	7:23.47	Germany; Julia Leiding; Carlotta Nwajide	7:24.52
JW4-	China; Xiaoqin Wang; Yuanyuan Gu; Shuang Qu; Xiaotong Cui	6:53.10	United States; Ruth Narode; Deirdre Fitzpatrick; Georgia Ratcliff; Kendall Chase	6:56.44	New Zealand; Kelsi Walters; Sophie Shingleton; Johannah Kearney; Holly Greenslade	7:01.36
JW4x	Romania; Andreea-Mihaela Tataru; Maricela-Dorina Otea; Viviana Iuliana Bejinariu; Ioana Vrînceanu	6:42.70	United States; Rosemary Grinalds; Elizabeth Sharis; Alexandra Zadravec; Cicely Madden	6:45.05	New Zealand; Nathalie Hill; Ruby Tew; Hannah Osborne; Zoe Mcbride	6:47.62
JW8+	Romania; Gianina Beleagă; Elena Turta; Alina-Elena Pop; Iuliana Popa; Ana-Maria Boca; Denisa-Maria Albu; Mihaela-Teodora Berindei; Giorgiana Cucu; Georgiana Danciu (cox)	6:34.98	United States; Joanna Mulvey; Carolina Ratcliff; Mackenzie Bartz; Claire Collins; Sylvie Sallquist; Mia Croonquist; Caroline Hart; Eliza Spillsbury; Amanda Rutherford (cox)	6:37.44	Italy; Serena Lo Bue; Silvia Terrazzi; Beatrice Arcangiolini; Ilaria Broggini; Ludovica Lucidi; Chiara Ondoli; Sandra Celoni; Giorgia Lo Bue; Federica Cesarini (cox)	6:41.78

== See also ==
- Rowing at the 2012 Summer Olympics
- 2012 World Rowing Championships
- 2012 World Rowing U23 Championships
