= Rowing at the 2013 Summer Universiade – Women's coxless four =

The women's coxless four competition at the 2013 Summer Universiade in Kazan took place the Kazan Rowing Centre.

== Results ==
=== Heats ===
==== Heat 1 ====
Rank	Rower	Country	Time	Notes
1	Claire-Louise Bode; Catherine Stark; Kate Christowitz; Holly Jean Norton	South Africa	6:59.13	Q
2	Yuliya Sidaruk; Marharyta Krechka; Katsiaryna Bakhankova; Hanna Kabral	Belarus	7:01.98	Q
3	Cecilia Bellati; Benedetta Bellio; Laura Basadonna; Sabrina Noseda	Italy	7:07.35	R
4	Martina Stillerova; Libuse Bruncvikova; Lucie Zabova; Katerina Kopecka	Czech Republic	7:07.96	R
5	Anna Karzynska; Marta Kowalska; Ewelina Slawinska; Monica Kaminska	Poland	7:07.96	R

==== Heat 2 ====
Rank	Rower	Country	Time	Notes
1	Yulia Pozdnyakova; Oxana Strelkova; Anastasia Karabelshchikova; Alexandra Fedorova	Russia	6:56.61	Q
2	Kateryna Sheremet; Ilona Romanesku; Ievgeniia Nimchenko; Daryna Verkhohliad	Ukraine	7:05.69	Q
3	Lea Duret; Evangeline Calloud; Alice Mayne; Anne Jouy	France	7:07.19	R
4	Sarah van der Linden; Ilse Klement; Yvonne Janse; Marja Haagsma	Netherlands	7:26.09	R

=== Repechage ===
Rank	Rower	Country	Time	Notes
	Cecilia Bellati; Benedetta Bellio; Laura Basadonna; Sabrina Noseda	Italy		
	Martina Stillerova; Libuse Bruncvikova; Lucie Zabova; Katerina Kopecka	Czech Republic		
	Anna Karzynska; Marta Kowalska; Ewelina Slawinska; Monica Kaminska	Poland		
	Lea Duret; Evangeline Calloud; Alice Mayne; Anne Jouy	France		
	Sarah van der Linden; Ilse Klement; Yvonne Janse; Marja Haagsma	Netherlands		
