= Katarzyna Zillmann =

Polish rower

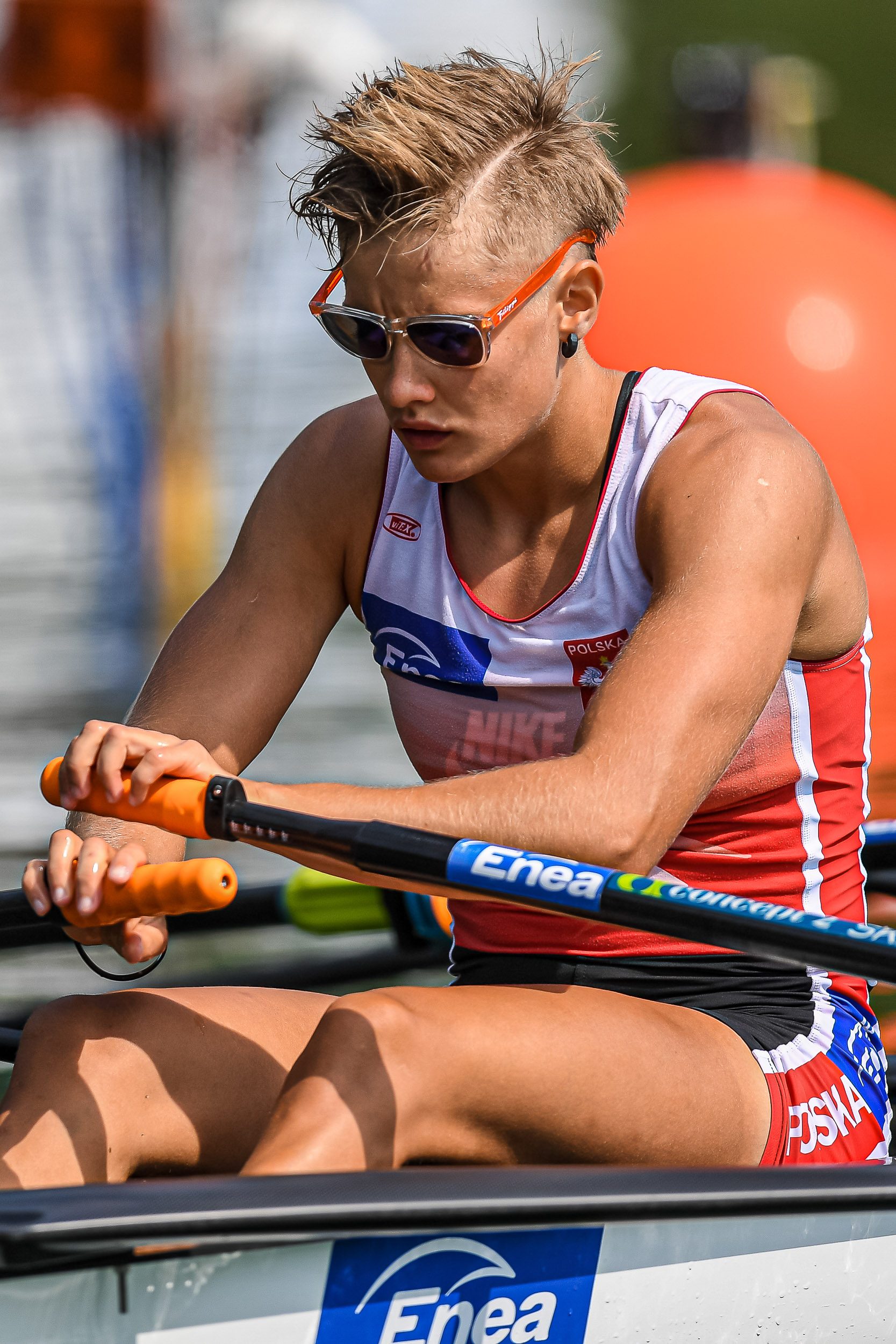
- Zillmann in 2019

Personal information
- Nationality: Polish
- Born: 26 July 1995 (age 31) Toruń, Poland
- Height: 1.76 m (5 ft 9 in)
- Weight: 63 kg (139 lb)

Sport
- Country: Poland
- Sport: Rowing
- Event: Quadruple sculls
Medal record
Women's rowing
Representing Poland
Event	1st	2nd	3rd
Olympic Games	0	1	0
World Championships	1	2	0
European Championships	1	0	0
Total	2	3	0
Olympic Games
Silver medal – second place	2020 Tokyo	Quadruple sculls
World Championships
Gold medal – first place	2018 Plovdiv	Quadruple sculls
Silver medal – second place	2017 Sarasota	Quadruple sculls
Silver medal – second place	2019 Ottensheim	Quadruple sculls
European Championships
Gold medal – first place	2018 Glasgow	Quadruple sculls

Katarzyna Zillmann (born 26 July 1995) is a Polish rower. She won the gold medal in the quadruple sculls at the 2018 World Rowing Championships as well as silver medal at the 2020 Summer Olympics in Tokyo.

== Life and career ==
She was born in 1995 in Toruń and started practicing rowing at the age of 14. In 2017, she claimed 4th place in the women's quadruple sculls at the 2017 European Rowing Championships and silver medal at the 2017 World Rowing Championships (together with Agnieszka Kobus, Marta Wieliczko and Maria Springwald).

In 2018, she won gold medals at the 2018 European Rowing Championships in Glasgow as well as the 2018 World Rowing Championships in Plovdiv.

In 2019, she won silver medal in the women's quadruple sculls at the 2019 World Rowing Championships.

In 2021, she won silver medal in women's quadruple sculls at the 2020 Summer Olympics in Tokyo (together with Agnieszka Kobus, Marta Wieliczko and Maria Sajdak).

In August 2021, she was awarded the Knight's Cross of the Order of Polonia Restituta.

== Personal life ==
Zillmann is a lesbian and was one of 186 out sportspeople participating at the 2020 Summer Olympic Games. In 2019, she took part in the "Sport Against Homophobia" social campaign. She was in a relationship with canoeist Julia Walczak. On 21 October 2021, she received the title of Ambassador of LGBT people at the LGBT+ Diamond Awards ceremony.

In 2025, she entered Taniec z gwiazdami where she danced with Janja Lesar as the first Polish female same-sex pair. They reached the show's semi-finals before being eliminated.

== See also ==
- Poland at the 2020 Summer Olympics
- List of Polish sportspeople
