= Huelskamp =

Huelskamp is a surname. Notable people with the surname include:

- Emily Huelskamp (born 1987), American rower
- Tim Huelskamp (born 1968), American politician
