= Kendall Chase =

American rower (born 1994)

Personal information
- Nickname: Kenny
- Born: August 25, 1994 (age 32) San Francisco, California, U.S.
- Home town: Evergreen, Colorado, U.S.
- Height: 6 ft 0 in (183 cm)
- Weight: 175 lb (79 kg)

Sport
- Country: United States
- Sport: Rowing
Medal record
Rowing
Representing United States
World U23 Championships
Gold medal – first place	2014 Varese	W4-
Gold medal – first place	2014 Varese	W8+
Gold medal – first place	2015 Plovdiv	W4-
Gold medal – first place	2015 Plovdiv	W8+
Gold medal – first place	2016 Rotterdam	W8+
World Junior Championships
Silver medal – second place	2012 Plovdiv	W4-

Kendall "Kenny" Chase (born August 25, 1994 in San Francisco, California) is an American rower who competes in international level events and has qualified to represent the United States at the 2020 Summer Olympics. She was a five-time World U23 champion and a World Junior silver medalist. She represented the United States at the 2020 Summer Olympics. She is openly a part of the LGBTQ+ community.

== Education ==
Kendall Chase attended Mullen High School in Evergreen, Colorado. In 2016, Kendall graduated from the University of California, Berkeley with a degree in Interdisciplinary Studies focusing on health and illness in society.

== Rowing ==
Kendall Chase began rowing in 2010 with Mile High Rowing. In 2011, Kendall finished third in the pair at 2011 USRowing Youth National Championships. In 2012, she finished third in the junior women's event at the 2012 C.R.A.S.H.-B. World Indoor Rowing Championships. With Mile High Rowing, she won gold in the pair and finished sixth in the four with coxswain at 2012 USRowing Youth National Championships.

While a student-athlete at the University of California, Berkeley, Chase won gold in the varsity eight and finished second in the team standings at the 2013 NCAA Women's Rowing Championship. In 2014, she finished third in the varsity eight and third in the team standings at the 2014 NCAA Women's Rowing Championship. Her junior year in 2015, Kendall stroked the varsity eight to a silver medal and finished second in the team standings at the 2015 NCAA Women's Rowing Championships. And in her senior year, in 2016, Kendall Chase won silver in the varsity eight and won the team title at the 2016 NCAA Women's Rowing Championships.

Kendall Chase competed at the 2020 Olympic games from July 24–28, 2021 in the Women's coxless four.
