= 2017 European Rowing Championships =

International rowing event

- Location: Račice, Czech Republic
- Dates: 24–28 May 2017

The 2017 European Rowing Championships were held in Račice, Czech Republic, between 24 and 28 May 2017.

== Medal summary ==
=== Men ===
Event	Gold	Time	Silver	Time	Bronze	Time
M1x	Ondřej Synek (CZE)	6:48.13	Damir Martin (CRO)	6:50.02	Stanislau Shcharbachenia (BLR)	6:52.99
M2-	Italy (ITA); Matteo Lodo; Giuseppe Vicino	6:22.58	France (FRA); Valentin Onfroy; Théophile Onfroy	6:25.96	Serbia (SRB); Miloš Vasić; Nenad Beđik	6:27.68
M2x	Italy (ITA); Filippo Mondelli; Luca Rambaldi	6:20.92	Poland (POL); Mirosław Ziętarski; Mateusz Biskup	6:22.10	Switzerland (SUI); Barnabé Delarze; Roman Röösli	6:24.16
M4-	Italy (ITA); Marco Di Costanzo; Giovanni Abagnale; Matteo Castaldo; Domenico Montrone	5:54.52	Romania (ROU); Cristian Ivascu; Vlad Dragoș Aicoboae; Marius Cozmiuc; Ciprian Tudosă	5:56.07	Russia (RUS); Aleksandr Stradayev; Daniil Andrienko; Semen Yaganov; Grigoriy Shchulepov	5:56.86
M4x	Lithuania (LTU); Dovydas Nemeravičius; Martynas Džiaugys; Rolandas Maščinskas; Aurimas Adomavičius	5:44.65	Poland (POL); Dominik Czaja; Dariusz Radosz; Wiktor Chabel; Adam Wicenciak	5:48.02	Italy (ITA); Romano Battisti; Andrea Panizza; Giacomo Gentili; Emanuele Fiume	5:49.13
M8+	Germany (GER); Johannes Weißenfeld; Felix Wimberger; Max Planer; Torben Johannesen; Jakob Schneider; Malte Jakschik; Richard Schmidt; Hannes Ocik; Martin Sauer	5:28.03	Poland (POL); Zbigniew Schodowski; Mateusz Wilangowski; Ryszard Ablewski; Robert Fuchs; Marcin Brzeziński; Bartosz Modrzyński; Mikołaj Burda; Michał Szpakowski; Daniel Trojanowski	5:30.91	Netherlands (NED); Boaz Meylink; Kaj Hendriks; Tone Wieten; Roel Braas; Ruben Knab; Mechiel Versluis; Robert Lücken; Bjorn van den Eynde; Diederik van Engelenburg	5:31.05
Men's lightweight events
LM1x	Michael Schmid (SUI)	6:51.72	Péter Galambos (HUN)	6:51.85	Niels Van Zandweghe (BEL)	6:51.91
LM2-	Ireland (IRL); Mark O'Donovan; Shane O'Driscoll	6:32.34	Russia (RUS); Nikita Bolozin; Aleksei Kiiashko	6:34.74	Italy (ITA); Giuseppe Di Mare; Alfonso Scalzone	6:34.89
LM2x	France (FRA); Pierre Houin; Jérémie Azou	6:17.67	Ireland (IRL); Gary O'Donovan; Paul O'Donovan	6:20.06	Italy (ITA); Stefano Oppo; Pietro Ruta	6:20.36
LM4-	Russia (RUS); Maksim Telitcyn; Aleksandr Bogdashin; Alexander Chaukin; Aleksey Vikulin	6:08.09	Italy (ITA); Matteo Pinca; Martino Goretti; Piero Sfiligoi; Catello Amarante	6:08.23	Czech Republic (CZE); Jan Hajek; Jan Vetešník; Jiří Kopáč; Milan Viktora	6:14.74

=== Women ===
Event	Gold	Time	Silver	Time	Bronze	Time
W1x	Victoria Thornley (GBR)	7:34.23	Ekaterina Karsten (BLR)	7:34.92	Annekatrin Thiele (GER)	7:35.79
W2-	Romania (ROU); Mădălina Bereș; Laura Oprea	7:00.53	Denmark (DEN); Hedvig Rasmussen; Christina Johansen	7:04.36	Great Britain (GBR); Karen Bennett; Holly Norton	7:06.65
W2x	Czech Republic (CZE); Kristýna Fleissnerová; Lenka Antošová	7:04.75	Netherlands (NED); Lisa Scheenaard; Marloes Oldenburg	7:06.24	Italy (ITA); Kiri Tontodonati; Stefania Gobbi	7:07.79
W4-*	Romania (ROU); Cristina-Georgiana Popescu; Alina Ligia Pop; Beatrice-Madalina Parfenie; Roxana Parascanu	6:51.64	Poland (POL); Monika Ciaciuch; Joanna Dittmann; Anna Wierzbowska; Maria Wierzbowska	6:55.32	Netherlands (NED); Willeke Vossen; Marleen Verburgh; Annemarie Bernhard; Lisanne Brandsma	6:59.23
W4x	Germany (GER); Daniela Schultze; Charlotte Reinhardt; Frauke Hundeling; Frieda Haemmerling	6:24.08	Netherlands (NED); Olivia van Rooijen; Inge Janssen; Sophie Souwer; Nicole Beukers	6:25.63	Great Britain (GBR); Bethany Bryan; Mathilda Hodgkins-Byrne; Jessica Leyden; Holly Nixon	6:26.54
W8+	Romania (ROU); Ioana Vrînceanu; Viviana-Iuliana Bejinariu; Mihaela Petrilă; Denisa Tîlvescu; Mădălina Bereș; Iuliana Popa; Adelina Cojocariu; Laura Oprea; Daniela Druncea	6:10.35	Netherlands (NED); Veronique Meester; Aletta Jorritsma; Kirsten Wielaard; Lies Rustenburg; José van Veen; Ymkje Clevering; Karolien Florijn; Monica Lanz; Ae-ri Noort	6:12.86	Russia (RUS); Julia Kalinovskaya; Valentina Plaksina; Anna Aksenova; Anna Karpova; Elena Oriabinskaia; Anastasia Tikhanova; Ekaterina Potapova; Alevtina Savkina; Evgenii Terekhov	6:16.05
Women's lightweight events
LW1x	Emma Fredh (SWE)	7:36.24	Denise Walsh (IRL)	7:38.00	Patricia Merz (SUI)	7:39.94
LW2x	Poland (POL); Weronika Deresz; Martyna Mikołajczak	6:58.55	Netherlands (NED); Marieke Keijser; Ilse Paulis	7:02.56	Great Britain (GBR); Katherine Copeland; Emily Craig	7:03.02

(*) Exhibition races

=== Medal table ===
Rank	Nation	Gold	Silver	Bronze	Total
1	Italy	3	1	4	8
2	Romania	3	1	0	4
3	Czech Republic	2	0	1	3
3	Germany	2	0	1	3
5	Poland	1	4	0	5
6	Ireland	1	2	0	3
7	Russia	1	1	2	4
8	France	1	1	0	2
9	Great Britain	1	0	3	4
10	Switzerland	1	0	2	3
11	Lithuania	1	0	0	1
11	Sweden	1	0	0	1
13	Netherlands	0	4	2	6
14	Belarus	0	1	1	2
15	Croatia	0	1	0	1
15	Denmark	0	1	0	1
15	Hungary	0	1	0	1
18	Belgium	0	0	1	1
18	Serbia	0	0	1	1
Totals (19 entries)		18	18	18	54
