= Michal Plocek =

Czech rower

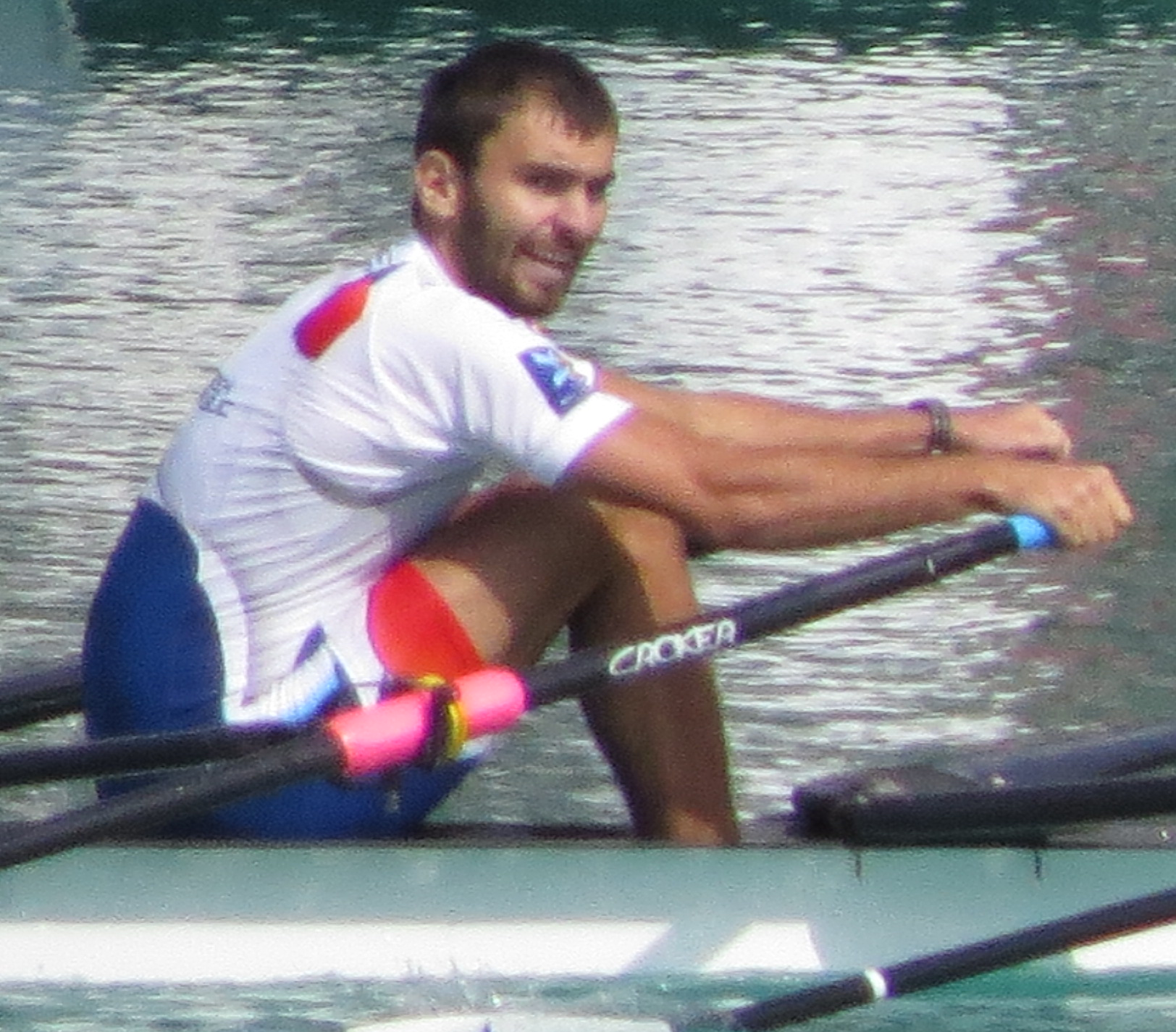

Personal information
- Nationality: Czech
- Born: 17 April 1994 Uherské Hradiště, Czech Republic
- Died: 28 November 2016 (aged 22) Prague, Czech Republic

Sport
- Sport: Rowing
Medal record
Men's rowing
Representing Czech Republic
World U23 Championships
Gold medal – first place	2014 Varese	Single sculls
Silver medal – second place	2013 Ottensheim	Double sculls
Bronze medal – third place	2016 Rotterdam	Single sculls
World Junior Championships
Gold medal – first place	2012 Plovdiv	Single sculls

Michal Plocek (17 April 1994 – 28 November 2016) was a Czech rower.

He won a gold medal at the 2012 World Rowing Junior Championships in the single sculls and competed in numerous other international rowing competitions, such as World Cups and European and World Championships.
