= Franziska Kampmann =

German rower

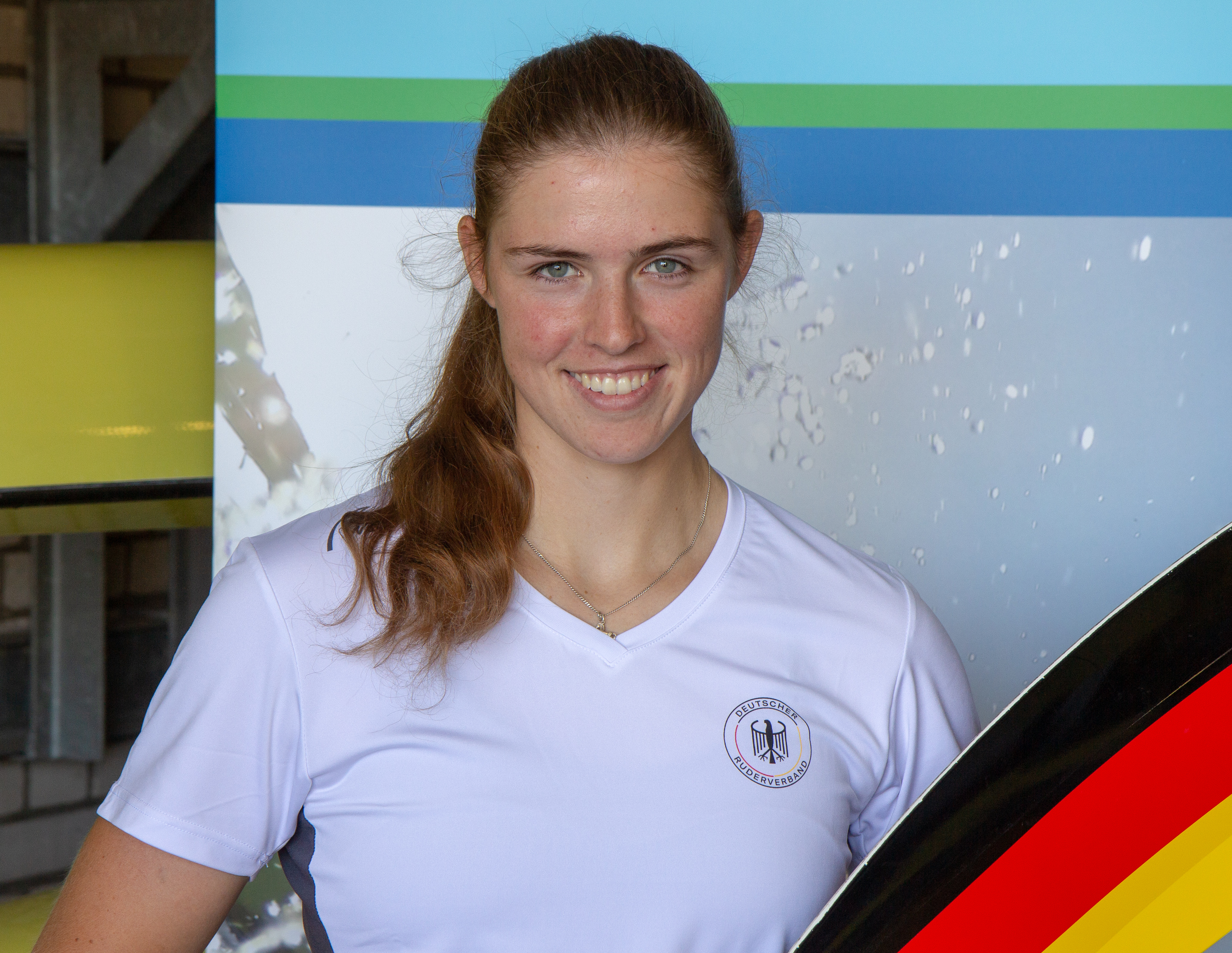
- Kampmann in 2018

Personal information
- Nationality: German
- Born: 5 June 1997 (age 29)

Sport
- Country: Germany
- Sport: Rowing
Medal record
Women's rowing
Representing Germany
World Championships
| Silver medal – second place | 2018 Plovdiv | Quadruple sculls |
World U23 Championships
| Bronze medal – third place | 2017 Plovdiv | Quadruple sculls |
World Junior Championships
| Gold medal – first place | 2015 Rio de Janeiro | Quadruple sculls |
| Silver medal – second place | 2014 Hamburg | Double sculls |
European Championships
| Gold medal – first place | 2019 Lucerne | Quadruple sculls |
| Silver medal – second place | 2020 Poznań | Quadruple sculls |
| Bronze medal – third place | 2021 Varese | Quadruple sculls |

Franziska Kampmann (born 5 June 1997) is a German rower. She competed in the women's quadruple sculls event at the 2020 Summer Olympics.
