= Sophie Souwer =

Dutch rower (born 1987)

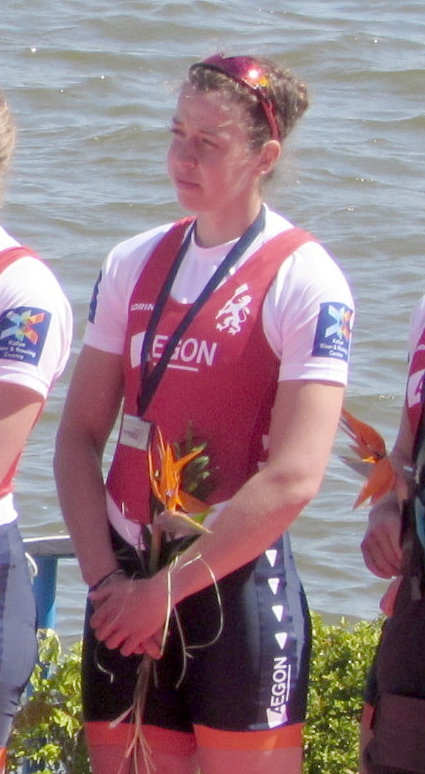
- Souwer at the 2016 European Championships

Personal information
- Full name: Anna Sarah Souwer
- Nationality: Dutch
- Born: 29 June 1987 (age 39) Westervoort, Netherlands
- Education: Inholland University of Applied Sciences
- Height: 1.86 m (6 ft 1 in)
- Weight: 76 kg (168 lb)

Sport
- Country: Netherlands
- Sport: Rowing
- Events: Quadruple sculls, Eight
- Club: A.G.S.R. GYAS Groningen
- Coached by: Josy Verdonkschot

Achievements and titles
- Olympic finals: 2016
Medal record
Women's rowing
Representing Italy
European Championships
Bronze medal – third place	2026 Varese	Eight
Bronze medal – third place	2026 Varese	Mixed double sculls
Representing the Netherlands
World Championships
Gold medal – first place	2017 Sarasota	Quadruple sculls
Bronze medal – third place	2018 Plovdiv	Quadruple sculls
Bronze medal – third place	2019 Ottensheim	Quadruple sculls
European Championships
Silver medal – second place	2013 Seville	Quadruple sculls
Silver medal – second place	2015 Poznań	Eight
Silver medal – second place	2016 Brandenburg	Eight
Silver medal – second place	2017 Račice	Quadruple sculls
Silver medal – second place	2019 Lucerne	Quadruple sculls
Bronze medal – third place	2018 Glasgow	Quadruple sculls

Anna Sarah "Sophie" Souwer (born 29 June 1987) is a Dutch rower who won three silver medals at the European championships in 2013–2016. She placed sixth in the eight at the 2016 Summer Olympics.

Souwer and her brothers were raised by relatives as her mother died and her father was unable to look after them. Her nickname Sophie comes from the novel Sophie's Choice. She studied nursing at Hanze University of Applied Sciences and has a bachelor's degree in obstetrics from University of Midwifery Amsterdam Groningen.
