= Olivia van Rooijen =

Dutch rower (born 1988)

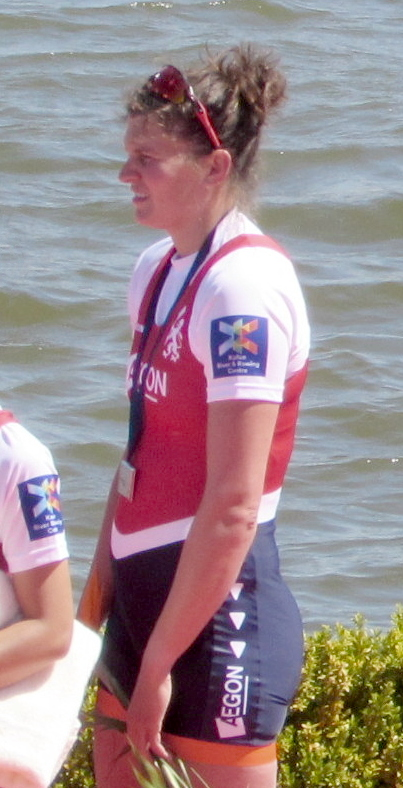
- Van Rooijen at the 2016 European Championships

Personal information
- Nationality: Dutch
- Born: 29 October 1988 (age 37) Amsterdam, Netherlands
- Height: 1.80 m (5 ft 11 in)
- Weight: 64 kg (141 lb)

Sport
- Country: Netherlands
- Sport: Rowing
- Event(s): Quad scull, Coxless four, Eight
- Club: De Hoop KAR ZV
- Coached by: Josy Verdonkschot

Achievements and titles
- Olympic finals: Tokyo 2020 W4X
Medal record
Women's rowing
Representing the Netherlands
World Championships
Bronze medal – third place	2011 Bled	Coxless four
Gold medal – first place	2017 Sarasota	Quadruple sculls
Bronze medal – third place	2018 Plovdiv	Quadruple sculls
Bronze medal – third place	2019 Ottensheim	Quadruple sculls
European Championships
Silver medal – second place	2015 Poznań	Coxless pair
Silver medal – second place	2016 Brandenburg	Eight
Silver medal – second place	2017 Račice	Quadruple sculls
Bronze medal – third place	2018 Glasgow	Quadruple sculls
Silver medal – second place	2019 Lucerne	Quadruple sculls
Gold medal – first place	2020 Poznań	Quadruple sculls

Olivia van Rooijen (born 29 October 1988) is a Dutch rower. She won a bronze medal at the 2011 World Championships and two silver medals at the European championships in 2015–2016. She placed sixth in the women's eight at the 2016 Summer Olympics. Van Rooijen took up rowing in 2001. She has a degree in chemistry from University of Amsterdam.
