= Bethany Bryan =

British rower

Personal information
- Born: 23 April 1993 (age 33)
Medal record
Women's rowing
Representing Great Britain
World Championships
Bronze medal – third place	2017 Sarasota	Quadruple sculls
European Championships
Bronze medal – third place	2017 Račice	Quadruple sculls

Bethany Bryan (born 23 April 1993) is a British rower from Teesside. She won a bronze medal in the quad scull at the 2017 European Rowing Championships. She won a bronze medal at the 2017 World Rowing Championships in Sarasota, Florida, as part of the quadruple sculls with Mathilda Hodgkins-Byrne, Jessica Leyden and Holly Nixon.
