= Cara Grzeskowiak =

Australian rower (born 1995)

Personal information
- Born: 17 September 1995 (age 30)
- Years active: 2014-current

Sport
- Sport: Rowing
- Club: Capital Lakes Rowing Club

Cara Grzeskowiak (born 17 September 1995) is an Australian representative rower. She is a four-time Australian underage national champion and a 2019 senior national champion. In 2019 she won a bronze medal at a World Rowing Cup.

== Club and state rowing ==
Grzeskowiak grew up in Canberra and her senior club rowing has been from the Capital Lakes Rowing Club in the Australian Capital Territory.

Grzeskowiak's first state selection for the ACT was in 2014 in the women's youth eight contesting the Bicentennial Cup at the Interstate Regatta within the Australian Rowing Championships. In 2015, 2016, 2018 and 2019 she was the ACT's representative single sculler selected to contest the Nell Slatter Trophy at the Interstate Regatta.

Grzeskowiak raced in Capital Lakes colours in composite Canberra crews contesting the U23 double and quad scull events at the 2014 Australian Rowing Championships. In 2015 she won the U23 women's quad scull and double scull Australian championships and placed second in the U23 single scull title. In 2016 she repeated those three results in those same three U23 national sculling titles.

In 2018 she contested the open single sculls title placing fourth and the open double scull with Harriet Hudson for a third place. In 2019 she placed third in the Australian open women's single scull championship, won the open women's double scull with Fiona Ewing and contested the open's women's quad scull title in a composite crew.

== International representative rowing ==
Grzeskowiak made her Australian representative debut at the 2016 World Rowing U23 Championships in Rotterdam for which she was selected as Australia's single sculler. She made the A final and finished in fifth place.

In 2019 Grzeskowiak was selected in the Australian senior women's quad scull with Katrina Bateman, Rowena Meredith and Fiona Ewing. They rowed to a fourth place at the World Rowing Cup II in Poznan and then to a bronze medal win at WRC III in Rotterdam. In that same crew Grzeskowiak was selected to race Australia's quad scull at the 2019 World Rowing Championships in Linz, Austria. The quad were looking for a top eight finish at the 2019 World Championships to qualify for the Tokyo Olympics. They placed fourth in the B-final for an overall tenth place finish and failed to qualify the boat for Tokyo 2020.
