= Katrina Bateman =

Australian rower (born 1992)

Personal information
- Born: 8 September 1992 (age 34)
- Years active: 2010-current

Sport
- Sport: Rowing
- Club: Mercantile Rowing Club

Achievements and titles
- National finals: Queen's Cup 2012-21
Medal record
Women's rowing
Representing Australia
U23 World Championships
Silver medal – second place	2010 Amsterdam	BW4-
Bronze medal – third place	2011 Trakai	BW4X

Katrina Bateman (born 8 September 1992) is an Australian former representative rower. She is a ten-time Australian national champion, winning four national titles in the single year of 2015 and rowing in successful Victorian Queen's Cup crews for six consecutive years from 2011-2016. She was twice a medallist at underage world championships and has won gold, silver and bronze medals at World Rowing Cups between 2013 and 2019.

== Club and state rowing ==
Bateman's senior club rowing has been from the Mercantile Rowing Club in Melbourne. She is the older sister of Amanda Bateman who is also an elite rower who has competed for Mercantile, her state of Victoria and Australia.

Her state representative debut for Victoria came in 2011 in the senior women's eight which contested and won the Queen's Cup at the Interstate Regatta. She made six consecutive Queen's Cup appearances for Victoria in 2012, 2013, 2014, 2015, 2016 and all of those crews were victorious.

Bateman raced in Mercantile colours contesting the women's eight event at the 2011 Australian Rowing Championships. In 2013, 2014 and 2015 she contested the women's coxed pair title at the Australian Rowing Championships, winning that title in 2015. She won the women's eight national championship in a composite Australian selection crew in 2014 and in a Mercantile crew in 2015. In 2015 she rounded out all three women's sweep oar titles, also winning the women's coxless four championship in a Mercantile crew.

In 2019 Bateman returned to the elite level, racing at the Australian Rowing Championships in Mercantile colours in the single scull and in a quad scull for those national titles. In 2021 she returned to the Victorian senior women's eight for the Interstate Regatta and won her seventh Queen's Cup.

== International representative rowing ==
Bateman made her Australian representative debut at the 2010 Junior World Rowing Championships in Racice where she rowed in the Australian quad scull to an eight placing. In 2011 and 2012 she was selected to represent at the World Rowing U23 Championships. She won a bronze medal in the quad scull in Trakai in 2011 and won a silver medal in Australia's coxless four in Amsterdam in 2012.

In 2013 Bateman moved into the Australian senior women's sweep squad and that year she raced in the green and gold at all international representative regattas. At the World Rowing Cup I in Sydney she raced in the Australian women's eight to a gold medal and also won bronze in a coxless pair with Tess Gerrand. Then at both the WRC II in Eton Dorney and the WRC III in Lucerne, Bateman and Gerrand rowed to seventh placings in the coxless pair. At the 2013 World Rowing Championships in Chungju, Korea Bateman and Gerrand rowed in both the coxless pair (to twelfth place) and in the women's eight to a fifth place finish.

In 2014 Bateman made three national representative appearances - in the coxless pair at the World Rowing Cup I in Sydney, then in the Australian women's eight at the WRC III in Lucerne and at the 2014 World Rowing Championships in Amsterdam. In 2015 she stroked half of the Australian women's eight to a silver medal in a coxless four at the WRC II in Varese, and also rowed in the eight to a sixth placing. At the WRC III in Lucerne she stroked the eight to a sixth placing and then at the 2015 World Rowing Championships in Aigubelette she rowed in the eight where they finished eighth.

In 2019 after a four year absence from the Australian senior squad Bateman moved back into Australia's quad scull with Cara Grzeskowiak, Rowena Meredith and Fiona Ewing. She stroked that crew to fourth place at the World Rowing Cup II in Poznan and then was in the two seat for their bronze medal win at WRC III in Rotterdam. In that same crew Bateman was selected to race Australia's quad scull at the 2019 World Rowing Championships in Linz, Austria. The quad were looking for a top eight finish at the 2019 World Championships to qualify for the Tokyo Olympics. They placed fourth in the B-final for an overall tenth place finish and failed to qualify the boat for Tokyo 2020.
