= 2018 European Rowing Championships =

European rowing competition

- Venue: Strathclyde Country Park
- Location: Glasgow, Scotland, Great Britain
- Dates: 2–5 August

The 2018 European Rowing Championships were rowing championships for European members of the International Rowing Federation (FISA) plus Israel. They were held as part of a new multi-sport European Championships at the Strathclyde Country Park near Motherwell, Scotland.

== Background ==
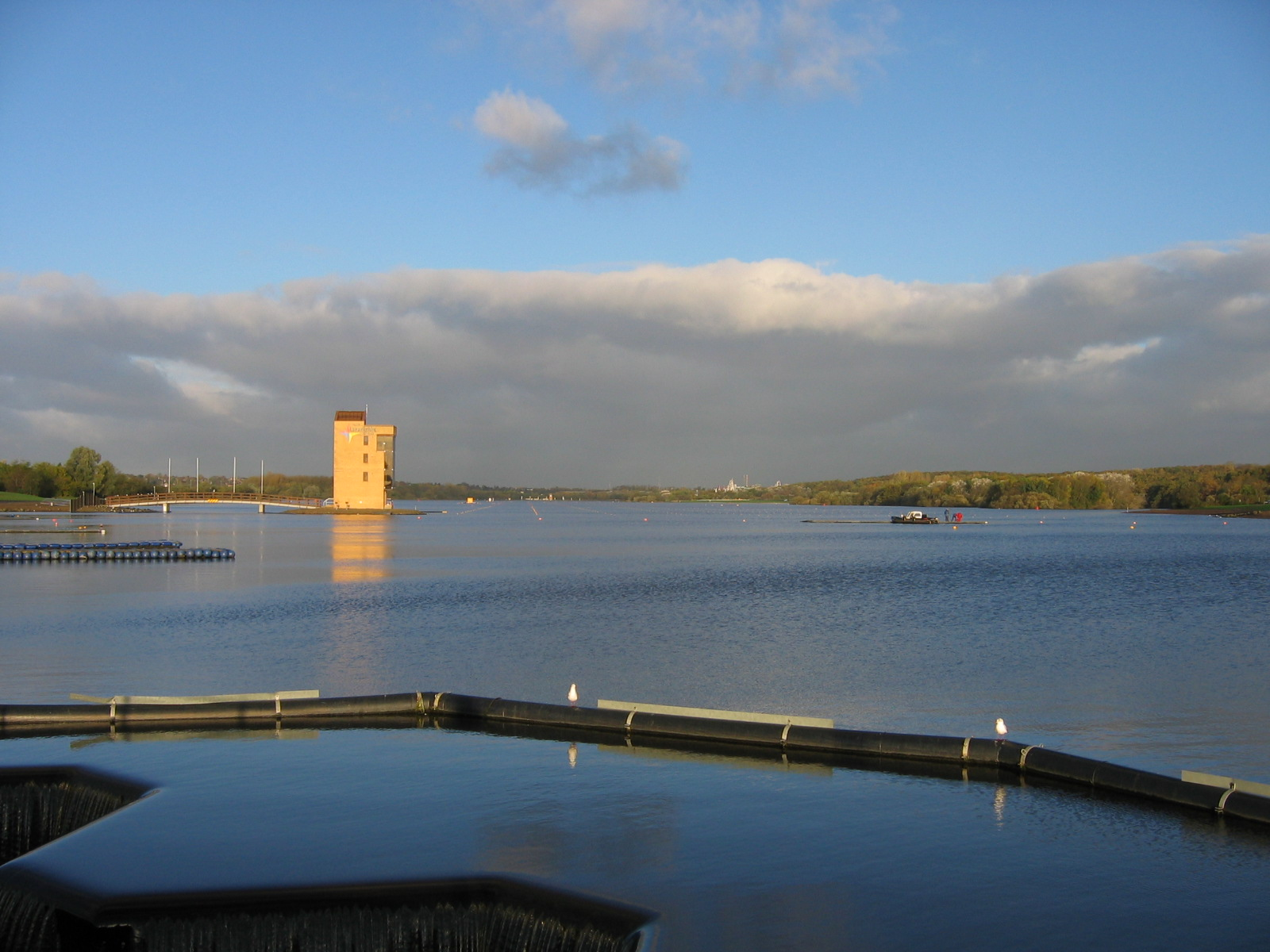
Strathclyde Country Park, Motherwell, Scotland

2018 was the first time that the European Rowing Championships, first held in 1893, were being held in Scotland. Competitions were being held in 17 boat classes with both lightweight and open weight events. Nearly 500 rowers were participating. The host, British Rowing, had nominated a 53-strong team for the competition.

== Medal summary ==
=== Men ===
Event	Gold	Time	Silver	Time	Bronze	Time
M1x	Kjetil Borch; Norway	6:49.95	Mindaugas Griškonis; Lithuania	6:50.68	Roman Röösli; Switzerland	6:52.06
M2-	Croatia (CRO); Martin Sinković; Valent Sinković	6:26.42	France (FRA); Valentin Onfroy; Théophile Onfroy	6:27.40	Romania (ROU); Marius Cozmiuc; Ciprian Tudosă	6:29.39
M2x	France (FRA); Hugo Boucheron; Matthieu Androdias	6:10.21	Romania (ROU); Ioan Prundeanu; Marian Enache	6:10.71	Great Britain (GBR); Harry Leask; Jack Beaumont	6:10.84
M4-	Romania (ROU); Mihăiță Țigănescu; Cosmin Pascari; Ștefan Berariu; Ciprian Huc	5:54.34	Great Britain (GBR); Thomas Ford; Jacob Dawson; Adam Neill; James Johnston	5:55.71	France (FRA); Benoît Demey; Édouard Jonville; Sean Vedrinelle; Benoît Brunet	5:56.49
M4x	Italy (ITA); Filippo Mondelli; Andrea Panizza; Luca Rambaldi; Giacomo Gentili	5:41.92	Lithuania (LTU); Dovydas Nemeravičius; Saulius Ritter; Rolandas Maščinskas; Aurimas Adomavičius	5:43.40	Poland (POL); Szymon Pośnik; Maciej Zawojski; Dominik Czaja; Wiktor Chabel	5:43.88
M8+	Germany (GER); Johannes Weißenfeld; Felix Wimberger; Max Planer; Torben Johannesen; Jakob Schneider; Malte Jakschik; Richard Schmidt; Hannes Ocik; Martin Sauer	5:27.48	Netherlands (NED); Vincent van der Want; Boudewijn Röell; Maarten Hurkmans; Simon van Dorp; Mechiel Versluis; Ruben Knab; Lex van den Herik; Freek Robbers; Diederik van Engelenburg	5:29.51	Romania (ROU); Vlad Dragoș Aicoboae; Adrian Damii; Alexandru Matincă; Constantin Radu; Constantin Adam; Sergiu Bejan; Cristi Ilie Pîrghie; Alexandru Cosmin Macovei; Adrian Munteanu	5:29.71
Men's lightweight events
LM1x	Michael Schmid; Switzerland	6:54.93	Martino Goretti; Italy	6:56.30	Sam Mottram; Great Britain	6:57.18
LM2x	Norway (NOR); Kristoffer Brun; Are Strandli	6:20.85	Ireland (IRL); Gary O'Donovan; Paul O'Donovan	6:22.84	Italy (ITA); Stefano Oppo; Pietro Ruta	6:23.32
LM4x	Italy (ITA); Catello Amarante II; Paolo Di Girolamo; Andrea Micheletti; Matteo Mulas	6:01.01	Czech Republic (CZE); Jiří Kopáč; Jan Vetešník; Milan Viktora; Jan Cincibuch	6:09.13	Netherlands (NED); Jorke Kooijenga; Koen van Brussel; Bart Lukkes; Ward van Zeijl	6:10.54

=== Women ===
Event	Gold	Time	Silver	Time	Bronze	Time
W1x	Jeannine Gmelin; Switzerland	7:31.15	Magdalena Lobnig; Austria	7:32.62	Diana Dymchenko; Ukraine	7:32.67
W2-	Romania (ROU); Mădălina Bereș; Denisa Tîlvescu	7:15.53	Netherlands (NED); Elsbeth Beeres; Laila Youssifou	7:17.34	Italy (ITA); Alessandra Patelli; Sara Bertolasi	7:17.86
W2x	France (FRA); Hélène Lefebvre; Élodie Ravera-Scaramozzino	6:55.99	Netherlands (NED); Roos de Jong; Lisa Scheenaard	6:56.29	Lithuania (LTU); Milda Valčiukaitė; Ieva Adomavičiūtė	6:56.54
W4-	Russia (RUS); Ekaterina Sevostianova; Anastasia Tikhanova; Ekaterina Potapova; Elena Oriabinskaia	6:39.97	Romania (ROU); Mădălina Hegheș; Iuliana Buhuș; Mădălina Gabriela Cașu; Roxana Parascanu	6:41.87	Poland (POL); Olga Michałkiewicz; Joanna Dittmann; Monika Chabel; Maria Wierzbowska	6:42.58
W4x	Poland (POL); Agnieszka Kobus-Zawojska; Marta Wieliczko; Maria Springwald; Katarzyna Zillmann	6:20.92	Ukraine (UKR); Daryna Verkhohliad; Olena Buryak; Anastasiya Kozhenkova; Yevheniya Dovhodko	6:23.86	Netherlands (NED); Olivia van Rooijen; Karolien Florijn; Sophie Souwer; Nicole Beukers	6:24.95
W8+	Romania (ROU); Ioana Vrînceanu; Viviana-Iuliana Bejinariu; Adriana Ailincai; Maria Tivodariu; Beatrice-Madalina Parfenie; Iuliana Popa; Mădălina Bereș; Denisa Tîlvescu; Daniela Druncea	6:08.98	Great Britain (GBR); Anastasia Merlott Chilly; Rebecca Girling; Fiona Gammond; Katherine Douglas; Holly Hill; Holly Norton; Karen Bennett; Rebecca Shorten; Matilda Horn	6:10.09	Netherlands (NED); Ellen Hogerwerf; Marloes Oldenburg; Lies Rustenburg; José van Veen; Ymkje Clevering; Monica Lanz; Aletta Jorritsma; Carline Bouw; Dieuwke Fetter	6:10.78
Women's lightweight events
LW1x	Alena Furman; Belarus	7:41.60	Laura Tarantola; France	7:45.94	Clara Guerra; Italy	7:47.71
LW2x	Netherlands (NED); Marieke Keijser; Ilse Paulis	6:57.35	Poland (POL); Weronika Deresz; Joanna Dorociak	6:58.39	Switzerland (SUI); Patricia Merz; Frederique Rol	7:00.36

=== Medal table ===
Host nation

Rank	Nation	Gold	Silver	Bronze	Total
1	Romania (ROU)	3	2	2	7
2	France (FRA)	2	2	1	5
3	Italy (ITA)	2	1	3	6
4	Switzerland (SUI)	2	0	2	4
5	Norway (NOR)	2	0	0	2
6	Netherlands (NED)	1	3	3	7
7	Poland (POL)	1	1	2	4
8	Belarus (BLR)	1	0	0	1
8	Croatia (CRO)	1	0	0	1
8	Germany (GER)	1	0	0	1
8	Russia (RUS)	1	0	0	1
12	Great Britain (GBR)*	0	2	2	4
13	Lithuania (LTU)	0	2	1	3
14	Ukraine (UKR)	0	1	1	2
15	Austria (AUT)	0	1	0	1
15	Czech Republic (CZE)	0	1	0	1
15	Ireland (IRL)	0	1	0	1
Totals (17 entries)		17	17	17	51
