= Fiona Ewing =

Australian representative rower

Personal information
- Born: 23 April 1994 (age 32)
- Years active: 2016 – current

Sport
- Sport: Rowing
- Club: Sydney University Boat Club

Fiona Ewing (born 23 April 1994) is an Australian representative rower. She won three Australian national championship titles in 2019 and a bronze medal at a 2019 World Rowing Cup.

== Club and state rowing ==
Ewing grew up in north of Sydney at Terrigal, New South Wales and her senior club rowing has been from the Sydney University Boat Club.

Ewing's first state selection for New South Wales was in 2016 in the women's eight contesting the Queen's Cup at the Interstate Regatta within the Australian Rowing Championships. She rowed again in the New South Wales senior women's eight in 2017, 2018 and 2019 and rowed to a Queen's Cup victory in 2019.

Ewing raced in SUBC colours in NSW composite eights contesting the women's eight event at the 2017 and the 2018 Australian Rowing Championships. In 2017 she also contested the women's single and double sculls. In 2018 she contested the single sculls title and placed eighth.

In 2019 she placed fourth in the Australian women's single scull championship, won the women's double scull with Cara Grzeskowiak and won the women's eight title in a composite selection crew.

== International representative rowing ==
Ewing made her Australian representative debut at the 2016 World Rowing U23 Championships in Rotterdam where she rowed in the three seat of the Australian women's U23 eight to a fifth placing.

In 2019 Ewing was selected in the Australian senior women's quad scull with Katrina Bateman, Rowena Meredith and Cara Grzeskowiak. They rowed to a fourth place at the World Rowing Cup II in Poznan and then to a bronze medal win at WRC III in Rotterdam. In that same crew Ewing was selected to race Australia's quad scull at the 2019 World Rowing Championships in Linz, Austria. The quad were looking for a top eight finish at the 2019 World Championships to qualify for the Tokyo Olympics. They placed fourth in the B-final for an overall tenth-place finish and failed to qualify the boat for Tokyo 2020.
