= Nicole Beukers =

Dutch rower (born 1990)

Personal information
- Nationality: Dutch
- Born: 7 October 1990 (age 35) Leiderdorp, Netherlands
- Height: 1.69 m (5 ft 7 in)
- Weight: 70 kg (154 lb)

Sport
- Country: Netherlands
- Sport: Rowing
- Event(s): Double scull, Quad scull
- Club: Die Leythe LR ZV

Achievements and titles
- Olympic finals: Tokyo 2020 W4X
Medal record
Women's rowing
Representing the Netherlands
Olympic Games
Silver medal – second place	2016 Rio de Janeiro	Quadruple sculls
World Championships
Gold medal – first place	2017 Sarasota	Quadruple sculls
Bronze medal – third place	2015 Aiguebelette	Quadruple sculls
Bronze medal – third place	2018 Plovdiv	Quadruple sculls
Bronze medal – third place	2019 Ottensheim	Quadruple sculls
European Championships
Silver medal – second place	2013 Seville	Quadruple sculls
Silver medal – second place	2015 Poznań	Quadruple sculls
Silver medal – second place	2017 Račice	Quadruple sculls
Bronze medal – third place	2014 Belgrade	Double sculls
Bronze medal – third place	2018 Glasgow	Quadruple sculls

Nicole Beukers (born 7 October 1990) is a Dutch rower. She competed in the women's quadruple sculls event at the 2016 Summer Olympics.
