= Margaux Bailleul =

French rower

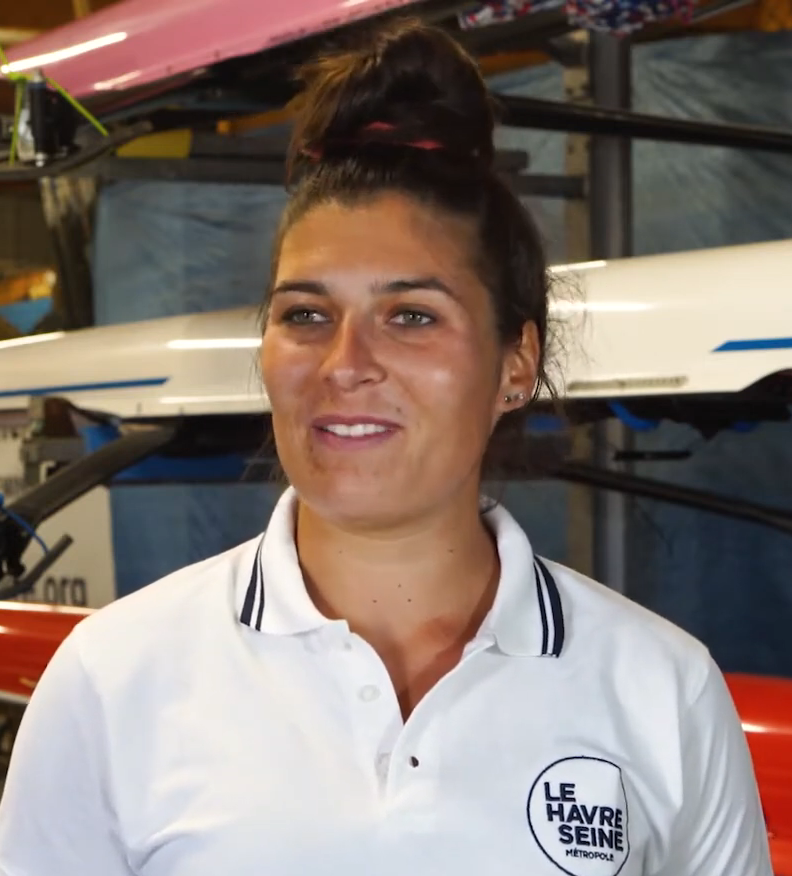

Personal information
- Nationality: French
- Born: 5 July 1999 (age 27)

Sport
- Sport: Rowing

Margaux Bailleul (born 5 July 1999) is a French rower. She competed in the women's quadruple sculls event at the 2020 Summer Olympics.
