= Maria Sajdak =

Polish rower (born 1991)

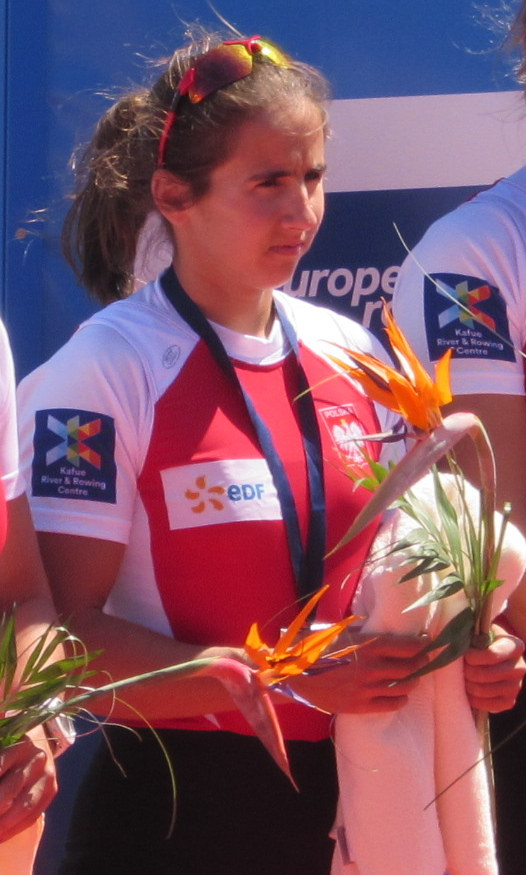
- Sajdak in 2016

Personal information
- Nationality: Polish
- Born: 30 July 1991 (age 34) Kraków, Poland
- Height: 1.74 m (5 ft 9 in)
- Weight: 70 kg (154 lb)

Sport
- Country: Poland
- Sport: Rowing
- Event: Quadruple sculls
Medal record
Women's rowing
Representing Poland
Event	1st	2nd	3rd
Olympic Games	0	1	1
World Championships	1	2	0
European Championships	1	1	2
Total	2	4	3
Olympic Games
Silver medal – second place	2020 Tokyo	Quadruple sculls
Bronze medal – third place	2016 Rio de Janeiro	Quadruple sculls
World Championships
Gold medal – first place	2018 Plovdiv	Quadruple sculls
Silver medal – second place	2017 Sarasota	Quadruple sculls
Silver medal – second place	2019 Ottensheim	Quadruple sculls
European Championships
Gold medal – first place	2018 Glasgow	Quadruple sculls
Silver medal – second place	2016 Brandenburg	Quadruple sculls
Bronze medal – third place	2014 Belgrade	Quadruple sculls
Bronze medal – third place	2015 Poznań	Quadruple sculls

Maria Sajdak (née Springwald; born 30 July 1991) is a Polish national representative rower, an Olympian and a world champion. She is a reigning world champion in the women's quad scull winning her title at the 2018 World Rowing Championships in Plovdiv. She competed in the women's quadruple sculls event at the 2016 Summer Olympics where she won a bronze medal.
