= Charlotte Hodgkins-Byrne =

British rower

Personal information
- Full name: Charlotte Ruby L. Hodgkins-Byrne
- Born: 8 October 1996 (age 29) Westminster, London, England
- Height: 173 cm (5 ft 8 in)

Sport
- Country: Great Britain
- Sport: Rowing
- Club: Gloucester Hartpury; University of London Boat Club
Medal record
Women's rowing
Representing Great Britain
World Rowing U23 Championships
Gold medal – first place	2017 Plovdiv	Women's pair
Gold medal – first place	2018 Poznan	Women's quad
Silver medal – second place	2016 Rotterdam	Women's eight
World Junior Championships
Bronze medal – third place	2014 Hamburg	Women's quads
European Championships
Silver medal – second place	2021 Varese	Quadruple sculls

Charlotte Ruby L. Hodgkins-Byrne (born 8 October 1996) is a British rower who competes in international level events. She is the younger sister of World Rowing Championships bronze medalist Mathilda Hodgkins-Byrne.

She competed for Great Britain at the 2020 Summer Olympics, finishing 7th in the women's quadruple sculls event.

In 2021, she won a European silver medal in the quadruple sculls in Varese, Italy.
