= Noémie Kober =

French rower

Personal information
- Born: 15 December 1993 (age 32) Grenoble, France
- Height: 1.80 m (5 ft 11 in)
- Weight: 72 kg (159 lb)

Sport
- Sport: Rowing

Noémie Kober (born 15 December 1993) is a French rower. She competed in the women's coxless pair event at the 2016 Summer Olympics.
