= Daryna Verkhohliad =

Ukrainian rower (born 1992)

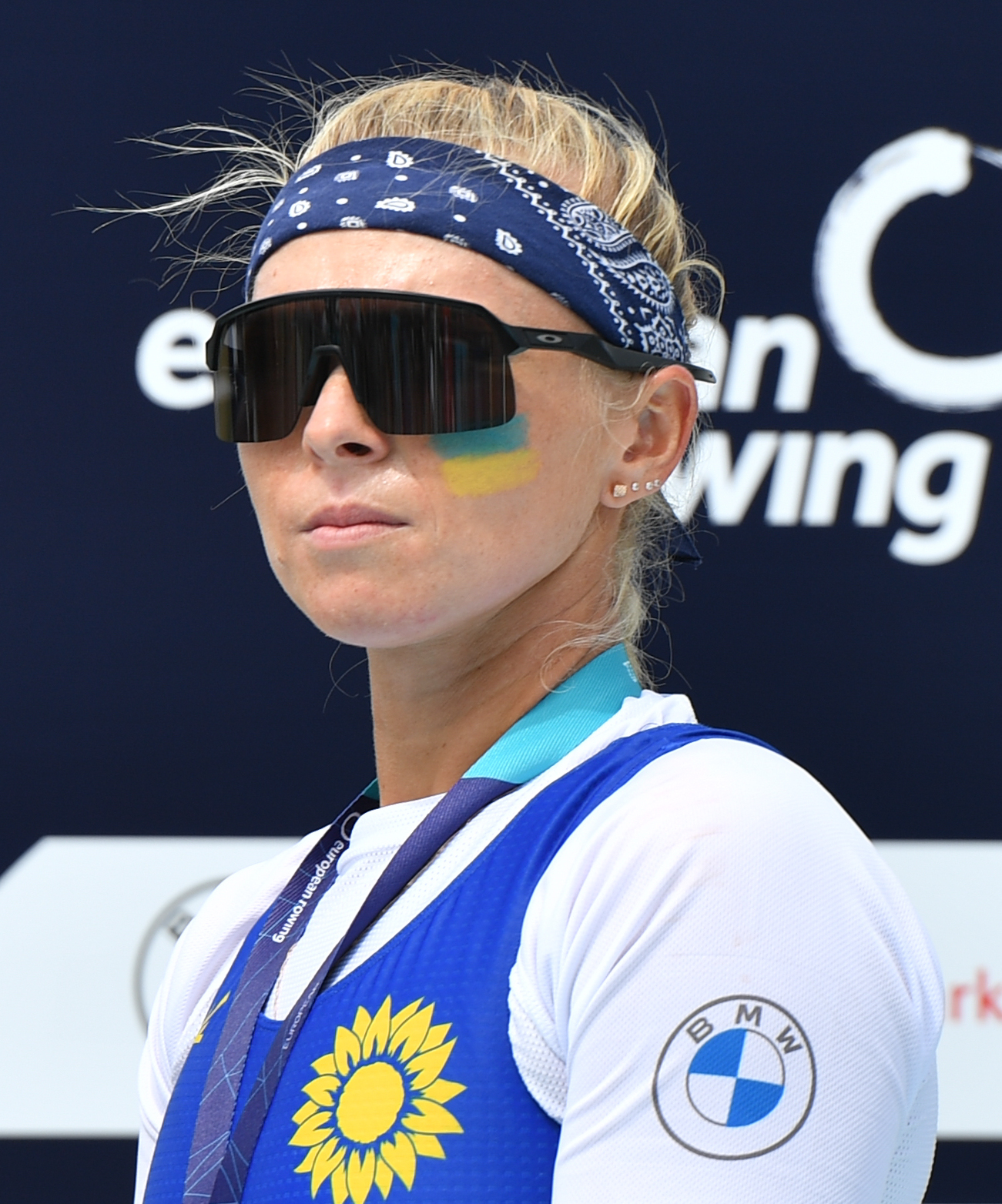

Personal information
- Born: 22 February 1992 (age 34) Velyka Oleksandrivka, Ukraine
- Height: 180 cm (5 ft 11 in)
- Weight: 80 kg (176 lb)
Medal record
Women's rowing
Representing Ukraine
European Championships
| Gold medal – first place | 2023 Bled | Quadruple sculls |
| Silver medal – second place | 2018 Glasgow | Quadruple sculls |
| Silver medal – second place | 2024 Szeged | Quadruple sculls |
| Bronze medal – third place | 2016 Brandenburg an der Havel | Quadruple sculls |
| Bronze medal – third place | 2019 Lucerne | Quadruple sculls |
| Bronze medal – third place | 2022 Oberschleißheim | Quadruple sculls |
Universiade
| Gold medal – first place | 2015 Chungju | Coxless four |
| Silver medal – second place | 2015 Chungju | Double sculls |
| Bronze medal – third place | 2013 Kazan | Coxless four |

Daryna Verkhohliad (Ukrainian: Дарина Верхогляд; born 22 February 1992 in Velyka Oleksandrivka, Kherson Oblast) is a Ukrainian rower.
