= Agnieszka Kobus =

Polish rower (born 1990)

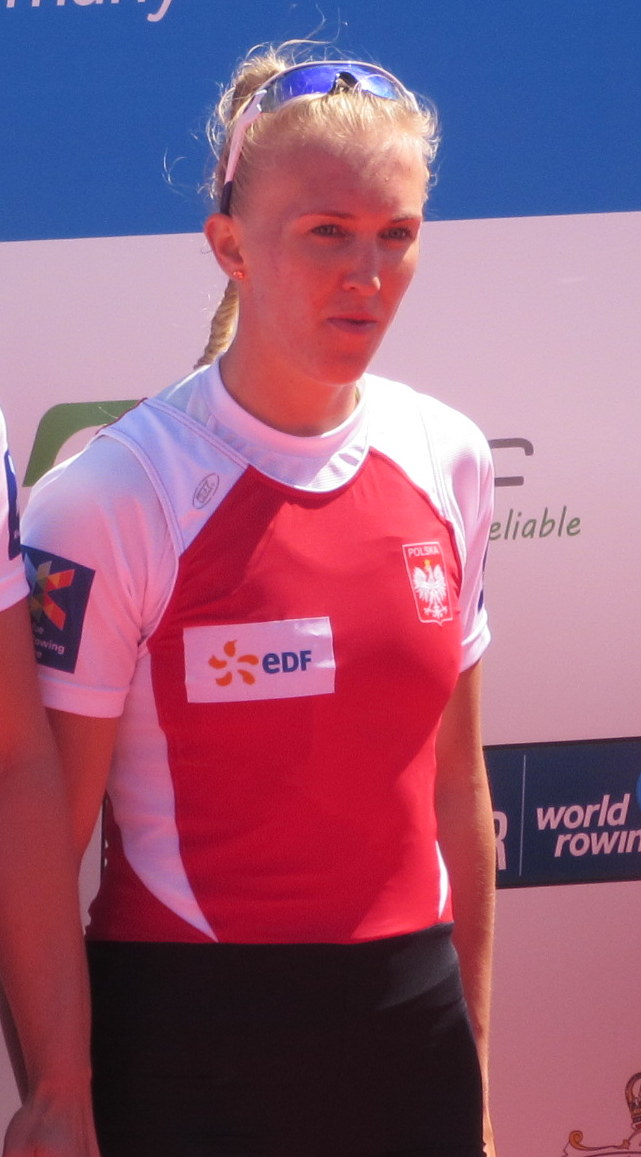
- Kobus in 2016

Personal information
- Full name: Agnieszka Kobus-Zawojska
- Nationality: Polish
- Born: 28 August 1990 (age 35) Warsaw, Poland
- Height: 1.76 m (5 ft 9 in)
- Weight: 67 kg (148 lb)

Sport
- Country: Poland
- Sport: Rowing
- Event: Quadruple sculls
Medal record
Women's rowing
Representing Poland
| Event | 1st | 2nd | 3rd |
|---|---|---|---|
| Olympic Games | 0 | 1 | 1 |
| World Championships | 1 | 2 | 0 |
| European Championships | 1 | 2 | 2 |
| Total | 2 | 5 | 3 |
Olympic Games
| Silver medal – second place | 2020 Tokyo | Quadruple sculls |
| Bronze medal – third place | 2016 Rio de Janeiro | Quadruple sculls |
World Championships
| Gold medal – first place | 2018 Plovdiv | Quadruple sculls |
| Silver medal – second place | 2017 Sarasota | Quadruple sculls |
| Silver medal – second place | 2019 Ottensheim | Quadruple sculls |
European Championships
| Gold medal – first place | 2018 Glasgow | Quadruple sculls |
| Silver medal – second place | 2011 Plovdiv | Quadruple sculls |
| Silver medal – second place | 2016 Brandenburg | Quadruple sculls |
| Bronze medal – third place | 2014 Belgrade | Quadruple sculls |
| Bronze medal – third place | 2015 Poznań | Quadruple sculls |

Agnieszka Kobus-Zawojska (Polish pronunciation: [aɡˈɲɛʂka ˈkɔbus]; born 28 August 1990) is a Polish national representative rower, an Olympian and a world champion. She is the reigning world champion in the women's quad scull winning her title at the 2018 World Rowing Championships in Plovdiv. She competed in the women's quadruple sculls event at the 2016 Summer Olympics, where she won a bronze medal.
