= Elena Logofătu =

Romanian rower

Personal information
- Nationality: Romanian
- Born: 30 April 1997 (age 27)

Sport
- Sport: Rowing

Elena Logofătu (born 30 April 1997) is a Romanian rower. She competed in the women's coxless four event at the 2020 Summer Olympics.
