= Daniela Schultze =

German rower

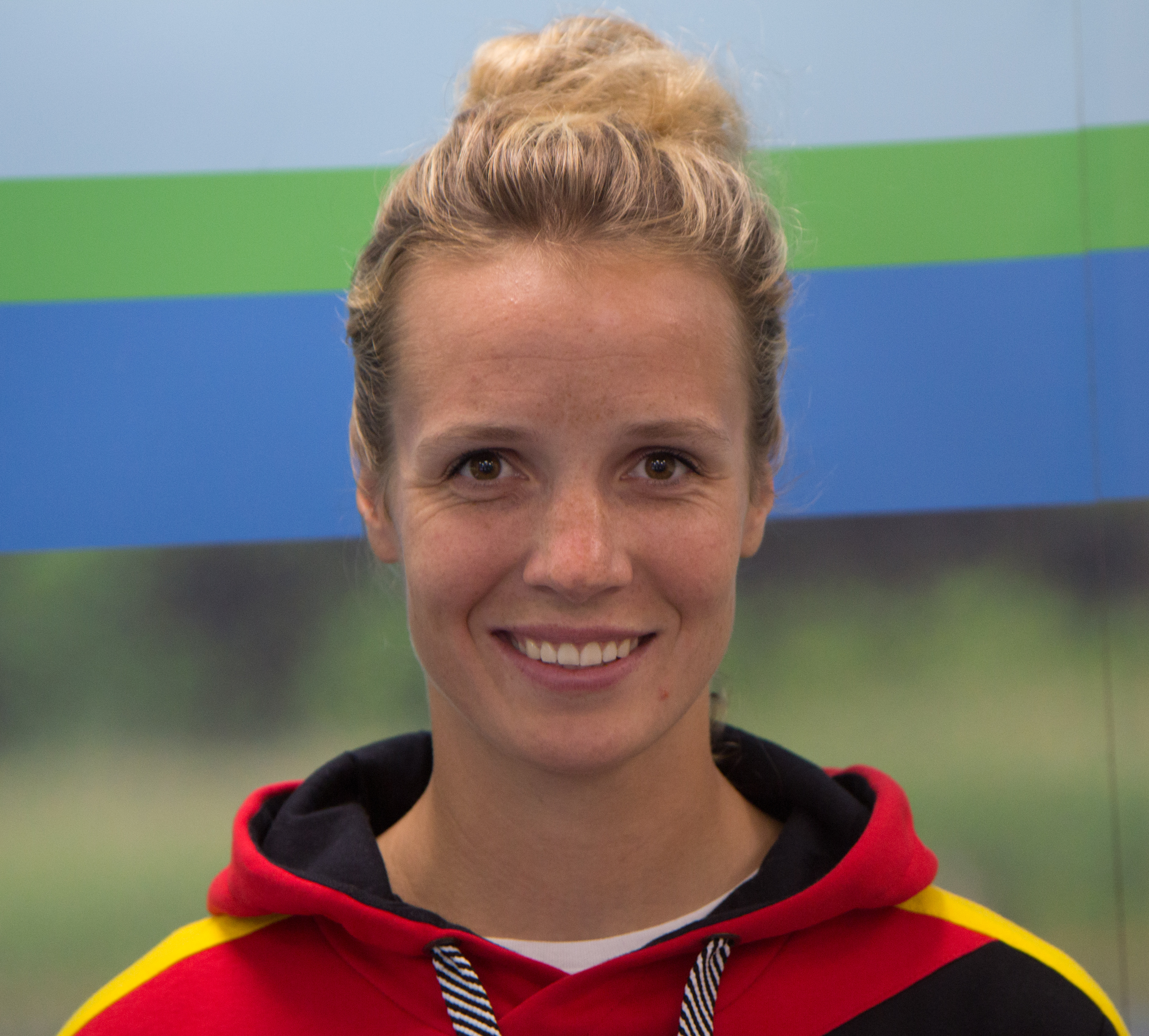
- Schultze in 2017

Personal information
- Nationality: German
- Born: 3 November 1990 (age 34); Cottbus, Germany

Sport
- Sport: Rowing

Achievements and titles
- Olympic finals: Tokyo 2020 W4X

Daniela Schultze, (born 3 November 1990) is a German rower. She competed in the women's eight event at the 2012 Summer Olympics.

Daniela Schultze won the U23 women's double sculls World Championship in 2011 with Mareike Adams. She was also part of the German quadruple sculls team that won the 2017 European Rowing Championships (with Charlotte Reinhardt, Frauke Hundeling and Frieda Hämmerling).
