= Mathilda Hodgkins-Byrne =

British rower (born 1994)

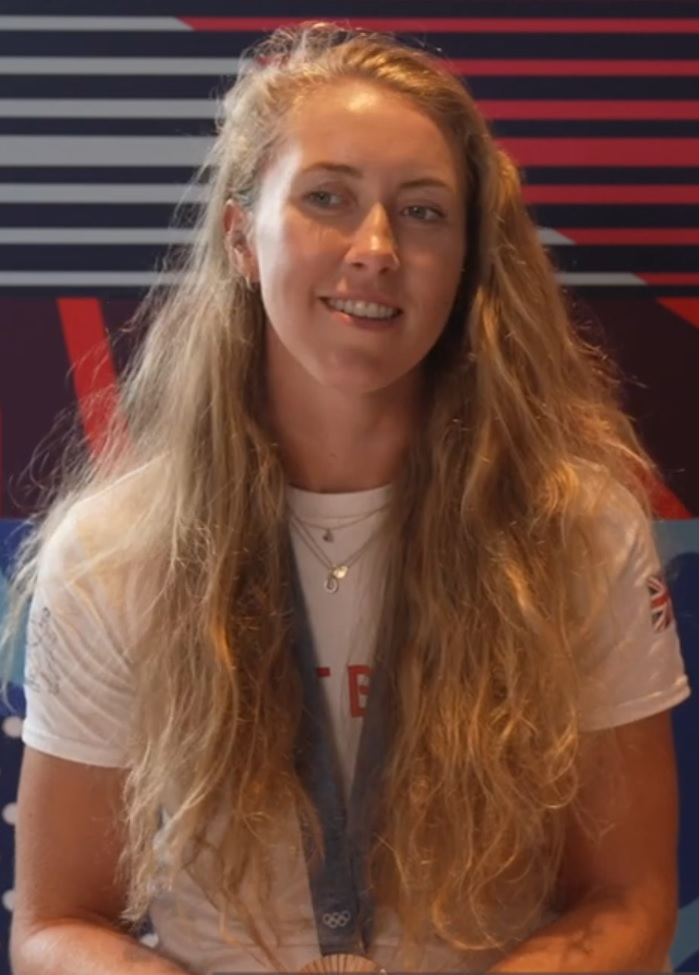
- Hodgkins-Byrne at the 2024 Summer Olympics

Personal information
- Full name: Mathilda Kathryn R. Hodgkins-Byrne
- Born: 1 October 1994 (age 32) Westminster, London, England
- Education: University of Reading
- Height: 174 cm (5 ft 9 in)

Sport
- Club: Gloucester Hartpury; Reading Univ BC
Medal record
Women's rowing
Representing Great Britain
Olympic Games
| Bronze medal – third place | 2024 Paris | Double sculls |
World Championships
| Bronze medal – third place | 2017 Sarasota | Quadruple sculls |
European Championships
| Bronze medal – third place | 2017 Račice | Quadruple sculls |
| Silver medal – second place | 2021 Varese | Quadruple sculls |

Mathilda Kathryn R. Hodgkins-Byrne (born 1 October 1994) is a British rower. She won a gold medal in the double scull at the 2016 World Rowing U23 Championships. She won a bronze medal at the 2017 World Rowing Championships in Sarasota, Florida, as part of the quadruple sculls with Bethany Bryan, Jessica Leyden, and Holly Nixon.

She competed for Great Britain at the 2020 Summer Olympics, finishing 7th in the women's quadruple sculls event.

In 2020 she won her second Wingfield Sculls, her previous win was in 2015. In 2021, she won a European silver medal in the quadruple sculls in Varese, Italy.

In June 2024, she was confirmed in the British squad for the 2024 Olympic Games in Paris. On 1 August 2024 Hodgkins-Byrne and Becky Wilde won a bronze medal in the double sculls finishing behind gold medallists New Zealand and silver medallists Romania.

== Early life and education ==
Hodgkins-Byrne grew up in Hereford, where she began training as a teenager. She graduated from the University of Reading.

== Personal life ==
Hodgkins-Byrne has a son and her sister is Charlotte Hodgkins-Byrne.
