= Yevheniya Dovhodko =

Ukrainian rower

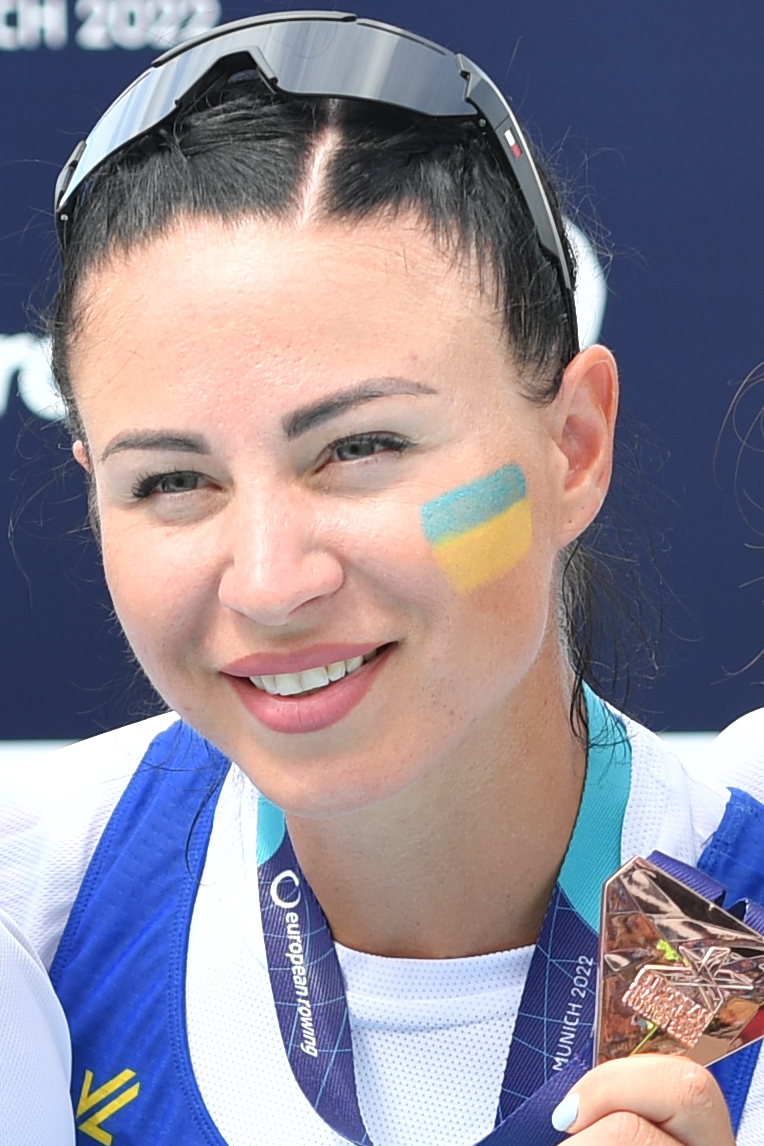
- Dovhodko at 2022 European Championships

Personal information
- Born: 29 September 1992 (age 33) Velyka Lepetykha, Kherson Oblast, Ukraine
- Height: 178 cm (5 ft 10 in)
- Weight: 69 kg (152 lb)
Medal record
Women's rowing
Representing Ukraine
European Championships
Silver medal – second place	2018 Glasgow	Quadruple sculls
Bronze medal – third place	2016 Brandenburg	Quadruple sculls
Bronze medal – third place	2019 Lucerne	Quadruple sculls
Bronze medal – third place	2022 Munich	Quadruple sculls
Universiade
Gold medal – first place	2013 Kazan	Single sculls

Yevheniya Serhiivna Dovhodko (née Nimchenko, Ukrainian: Євгенія Сергіївна Німченко, born 29 September 1992, in Velyka Lepetykha) is a Ukrainian rower. She competed for Ukraine at the 2016 Summer Olympics and 2024 Summer Olympics.
