= Chiara Ondoli =

Italian rower

Personal information
- Born: 12 October 1995 (age 29); Cittiglio, Italy
- Height: 1.84 m (6 ft 0 in)

Sport
- Country: Italy
- Sport: Rowing

Chiara Ondoli (born 12 October 1995) is an Italian rower. She competed in the 2020 Summer Olympics, in Double sculls.
