= Jessica Leyden =

British rower (born 1995)

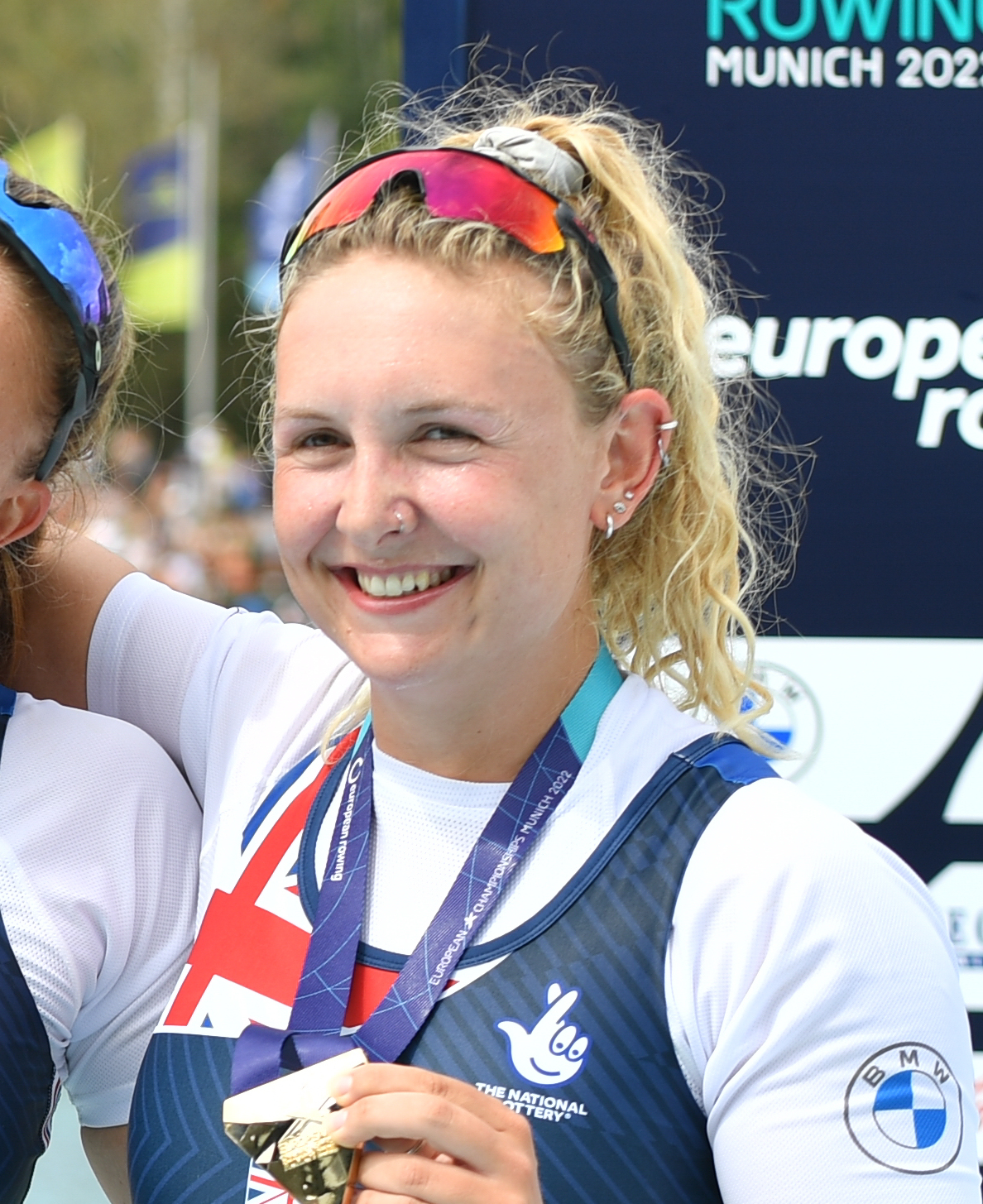

Personal information
- Born: 22 February 1995 (age 31)
- Home town: Todmorden, West Yorkshire
Medal record
Women's rowing
Representing Great Britain
World Championships
Bronze medal – third place	2017 Sarasota	Quadruple sculls
Bronze medal – third place	2022 Račice	Quadruple sculls
European Championships
Gold medal – first place	2022 Munich	Quadruple sculls
Bronze medal – third place	2017 Račice	Quadruple sculls

Jessica Leyden (born 22 February 1995) is a British rower.

In 2013, she won single sculls gold at the World Rowing Junior Championships, which made her the first British woman to win a global solo openweight rowing title at any level. At the time, she was a student at Bacup and Rawtenstall Grammar School. She won a bronze medal at the 2017 World Rowing Championships in Sarasota, Florida, as part of the quadruple sculls with Bethany Bryan, Mathilda Hodgkins-Byrne and Holly Nixon.

Leyden has twice won the Wingfield Sculls in 2016 and 2019 and also in 2019 it was announced she would represent Team GB at the 2020 Tokyo Olympic Games.
