= Emily Huelskamp =

American rower (born 1987)

Personal information
- Nationality: American
- Born: January 17, 1987 (age 39) Saint Louis, Missouri, U.S.
- Home town: Sainte Genevieve, Missouri, U.S.
- Height: 6 ft 2 in (188 cm)
Medal record
Women's rowing
Representing United States
World Championships
Gold medal – first place	2013 Chungju	Coxless four
Silver medal – second place	2016 Rotterdam	Coxless four
Pan American Games
Gold medal – first place	2015 Toronto	Coxless pair

Emily Huelskamp (born January 17, 1987) is an American rower. At the 2013 World Rowing Championships, she won a gold medal in the women's coxless four event. She also won a silver medal in the 2016 World Rowing Championships in the same event.
