= Marta Wieliczko =

Polish rower

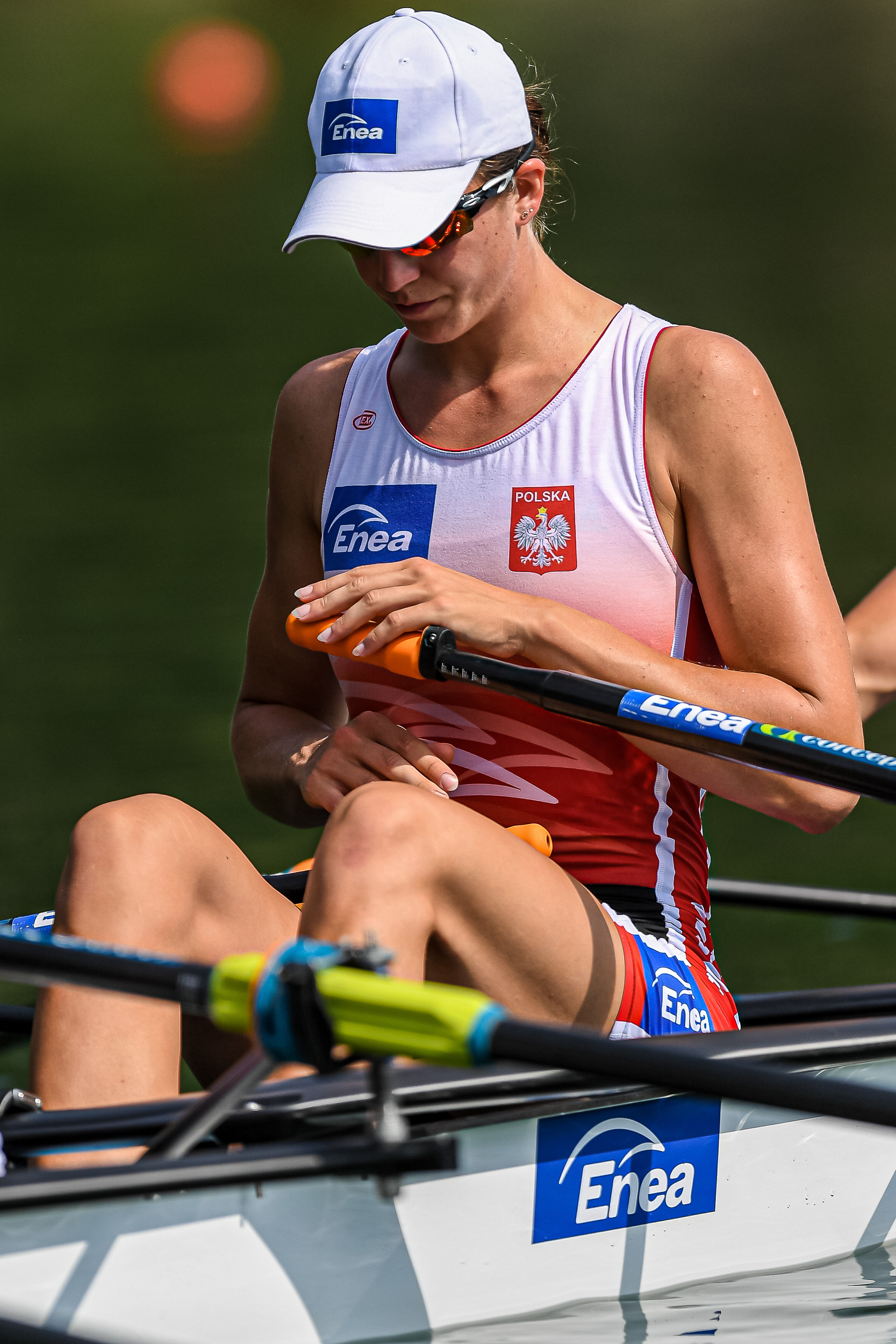

Personal information
- Nationality: Polish
- Born: 1 October 1994 (age 31) Gdańsk, Poland
- Height: 1.88 m (6 ft 2 in)
- Weight: 78 kg (172 lb)

Sport
- Country: Poland
- Sport: Rowing
- Event: Quadruple sculls
Medal record
Women's rowing
Representing Poland
Event	1st	2nd	3rd
Olympic Games	0	1	0
World Championships	1	2	0
European Championships	1	0	0
Total	2	3	0
Olympic Games
Silver medal – second place	2020 Tokyo	Quadruple sculls
World Championships
Gold medal – first place	2018 Plovdiv	Quadruple sculls
Silver medal – second place	2017 Sarasota	Quadruple sculls
Silver medal – second place	2019 Ottensheim	Quadruple sculls
European Championships
Gold medal – first place	2018 Glasgow	Quadruple sculls

Marta Wieliczko (born 1 October 1994) is a Polish rower. She won the gold medal in the quadruple sculls at the 2018 World Rowing Championships.
