= Frieda Hämmerling =

German rower

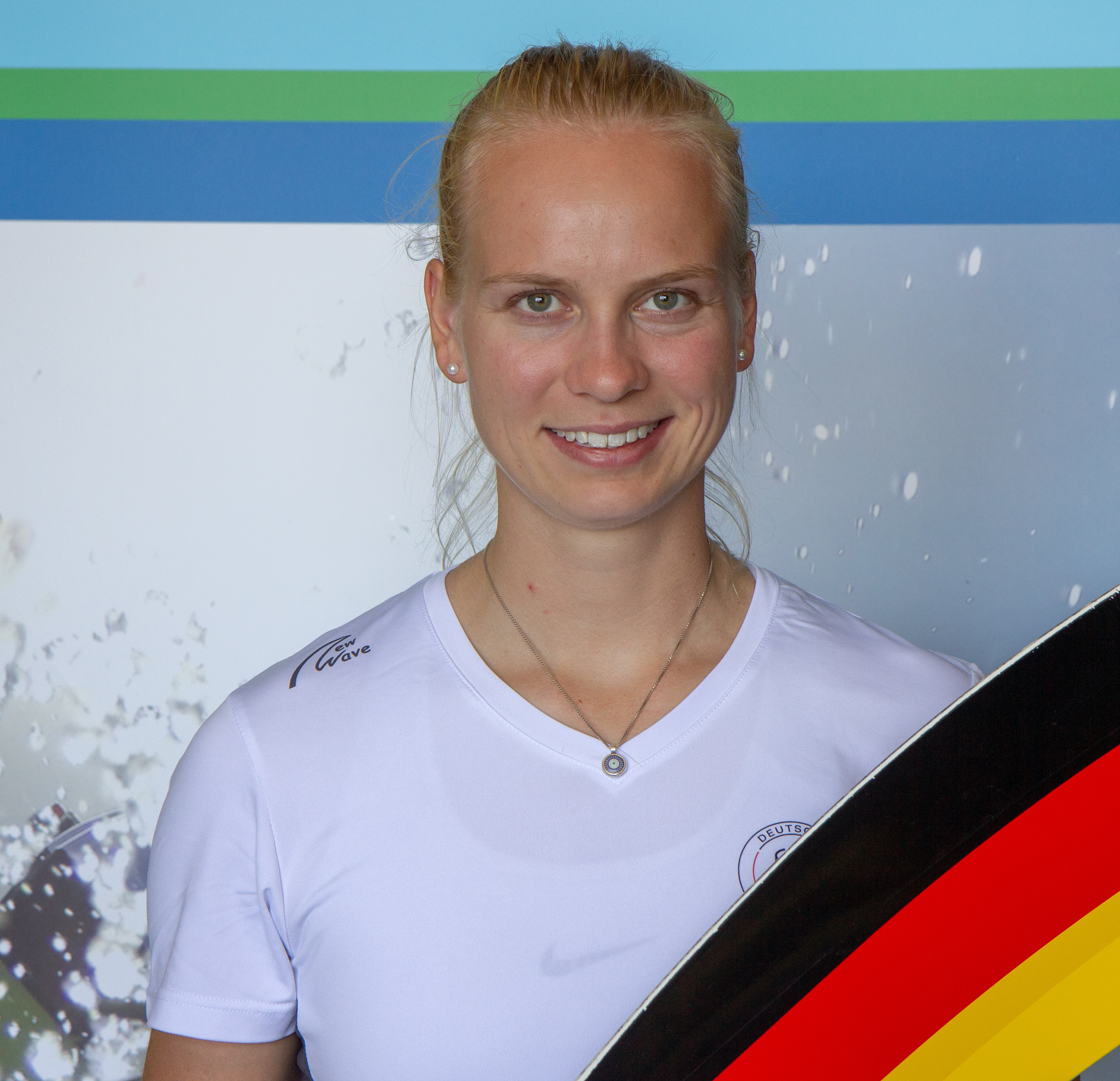
- Hämmerling in 2018

Personal information
- Nationality: German
- Born: 20 January 1997 (age 28)

Sport
- Sport: Rowing

Achievements and titles
- Olympic finals: Tokyo 2020 W4X

Frieda Hämmerling (born 20 January 1997) is a German rower. She competed in the women's quadruple sculls event at the 2020 Summer Olympics. She won her heat but ultimately failed to medal.
