= 2018 World Rowing Championships – Women's coxless four =

Rowing event

Women's coxless four at the 2018 World Rowing Championships
- Venue: Plovdiv Regatta Venue
- Location: Plovdiv, Bulgaria
- Dates: 10–15 September
- Competitors: 52 from 13 nations
- Winning time: 6:25.57

Medalists
gold medal	Madeleine Wanamaker; Erin Boxberger; Molly Bruggeman; Erin Reelick	United States
silver medal	Lucy Stephan; Katrina Werry; Sarah Hawe; Molly Goodman	Australia
bronze medal	Ekaterina Sevostianova; Anastasia Tikhanova; Ekaterina Potapova; Elena Oriabinskaia	Russia

The women's coxless four competition at the 2018 World Rowing Championships in Plovdiv took place at the Plovdiv Regatta Venue.

== Schedule ==
The schedule was as follows:

Date	Time	Round
Monday 10 September 2018	10:34	Heats
Tuesday 11 September 2018	11:13	Repechage
Thursday 13 September 2018	12:12	Semifinals A/B
Saturday 15 September 2018	10:10	Final B
Saturday 15 September 2018	12:31	Final A

All times are Eastern European Summer Time (UTC+3)

== Results ==
=== Heats ===
The three fastest boats in each heat advanced directly to the A/B semifinals. The remaining boats were sent to the repechage.

==== Heat 1 ====
Rank	Rowers	Country	Time	Notes
1	Lucy Stephan; Katrina Werry; Sarah Hawe; Molly Goodman	Australia	6:28.17	SA/B
2	Olga Michałkiewicz; Joanna Dittmann; Monika Chabel; Maria Wierzbowska	Poland	6:33.14	SA/B
3	Sophie Oksche; Frauke Hacker; Isabelle Hübener; Alexandra Höffgen	Germany	6:36.01	SA/B
4	Jessie Loutit; Karen Lefsrud; Larissa Werbicki; Kendra Wells	Canada	6:38.84	R
5	Mădălina Hegheș; Iuliana Buhuș; Mădălina-Gabriela Cașu; Roxana Parascanu	Romania	6:46.67	R

==== Heat 2 ====
Rank	Rowers	Country	Time	Notes
1	Madeleine Wanamaker; Erin Boxberger; Molly Bruggeman; Erin Reelick	United States	6:30.22	SA/B
2	Guo Linlin; Zhang Min; Yi Liqin; Wang Fei	China	6:31.40	SA/B
3	Ruby Tew; Phoebe Spoors; Georgia Perry; Elizabeth Jeurissen	New Zealand	6:34.99	SA/B
4	Sara Parfett; Caragh McMurtry; Emily Ashford; Josephine Wratten	Great Britain	6:38.90	R

==== Heat 3 ====
Rank	Rowers	Country	Time	Notes
1	Anne Larsen; Frida Sanggaard Nielsen; Hedvig Rasmussen; Ida Jacobsen	Denmark	6:24.81	SA/B
2	Ekaterina Sevostianova; Anastasia Tikhanova; Ekaterina Potapova; Elena Oriabinskaia	Russia	6:27.34	SA/B
3	Veronica Calabrese; Aisha Rocek; Ilaria Broggini; Giorgia Pelacchi	Italy	6:29.40	SA/B
4	Lies Rustenburg; Lisanne Brandsma; Elsbeth Beeres; Laila Youssifou	Netherlands	6:31.71	R

=== Repechage ===
The three fastest boats advanced to the A/B semifinals. The remaining boat took no further part in the competition.

Rank	Rowers	Country	Time	Notes
1	Lies Rustenburg; Lisanne Brandsma; Elsbeth Beeres; Laila Youssifou	Netherlands	6:29.30	SA/B
2	Mădălina Hegheș; Iuliana Buhuș; Mădălina-Gabriela Cașu; Roxana Parascanu	Romania	6:30.56	SA/B
3	Sara Parfett; Caragh McMurtry; Emily Ashford; Josephine Wratten	Great Britain	6:30.87	SA/B
4	Jessie Loutit; Karen Lefsrud; Larissa Werbicki; Kendra Wells	Canada	6:31.83	

=== Semifinals ===
The three fastest boats in each semi advanced to the A final. The remaining boats were sent to the B final.

==== Semifinal 1 ====
Rank	Rowers	Country	Time	Notes
1	Madeleine Wanamaker; Erin Boxberger; Molly Bruggeman; Erin Reelick	United States	6:41.10	FA
2	Lucy Stephan; Katrina Werry; Sarah Hawe; Molly Goodman	Australia	6:42.28	FA
3	Ekaterina Sevostianova; Anastasia Tikhanova; Ekaterina Potapova; Elena Oriabinskaia	Russia	6:44.16	FA
4	Lies Rustenburg; Lisanne Brandsma; Elsbeth Beeres; Laila Youssifou	Netherlands	6:45.20	FB
5	Sara Parfett; Caragh McMurtry; Emily Ashford; Josephine Wratten	Great Britain	6:49.65	FB
6	Ruby Tew; Phoebe Spoors; Georgia Perry; Elizabeth Jeurissen	New Zealand	6:57.51	FB

==== Semifinal 2 ====
Rank	Rowers	Country	Time	Notes
1	Anne Larsen; Frida Sanggaard Nielsen; Hedvig Rasmussen; Ida Jacobsen	Denmark	6:49.65	FA
2	Olga Michałkiewicz; Joanna Dittmann; Monika Chabel; Maria Wierzbowska	Poland	6:52.55	FA
3	Guo Linlin; Zhang Min; Yi Liqin; Wang Fei	China	6:56.39	FA
4	Veronica Calabrese; Aisha Rocek; Ilaria Broggini; Giorgia Pelacchi	Italy	6:59.79	FB
5	Sophie Oksche; Frauke Hacker; Isabelle Hübener; Alexandra Höffgen	Germany	7:04.60	FB
6	Mădălina Hegheș; Iuliana Buhuș; Mădălina-Gabriela Cașu; Roxana Parascanu	Romania	7:05.00	FB

=== Finals ===
The A final determined the rankings for places 1 to 6. Additional rankings were determined in the B final.

==== Final B ====
Rank	Rowers	Country	Time
1	Sara Parfett; Caragh McMurtry; Emily Ashford; Josephine Wratten	Great Britain	6:36.43
2	Lies Rustenburg; Lisanne Brandsma; Elsbeth Beeres; Laila Youssifou	Netherlands	6:37.96
3	Ruby Tew; Phoebe Spoors; Georgia Perry; Elizabeth Jeurissen	New Zealand	6:38.46
4	Veronica Calabrese; Aisha Rocek; Ilaria Broggini; Giorgia Pelacchi	Italy	6:39.26
5	Mădălina Hegheș; Iuliana Buhuș; Mădălina-Gabriela Cașu; Roxana Parascanu	Romania	6:44.38
6	Sophie Oksche; Frauke Hacker; Isabelle Hübener; Alexandra Höffgen	Germany	6:47.17

==== Final A ====
Rank	Rowers	Country	Time
1st place, gold medalist(s)	Madeleine Wanamaker; Erin Boxberger; Molly Bruggeman; Erin Reelick	United States	6:25.57
2nd place, silver medalist(s)	Lucy Stephan; Katrina Werry; Sarah Hawe; Molly Goodman	Australia	6:27.09
3rd place, bronze medalist(s)	Ekaterina Sevostianova; Anastasia Tikhanova; Ekaterina Potapova; Elena Oriabinskaia	Russia	6:27.36
4	Anne Larsen; Frida Sanggaard Nielsen; Hedvig Rasmussen; Ida Jacobsen	Denmark	6:28.78
5	Olga Michałkiewicz; Joanna Dittmann; Monika Chabel; Maria Wierzbowska	Poland	6:32.05
6	Guo Linlin; Zhang Min; Yi Liqin; Wang Fei	China	6:39.84
