= 2017 World Rowing Championships – Women's coxless four =

Women's coxless four at the 2017 World Rowing Championships
- Venue: Nathan Benderson Park
- Location: Sarasota, United States
- Dates: 25–30 September
- Competitors: 48 from 12 nations
- Winning time: 6:33.58

Medalists
gold medal	Lucy Stephan; Katrina Werry; Sarah Hawe; Molly Goodman	Australia
silver medal	Olga Michalkiewicz; Joanna Dittmann; Monika Ciaciuch; Maria Wierzbowska	Poland
bronze medal	Elena Oriabinskaia; Anastasia Tikhanova; Ekaterina Potapova; Alevtina Savkina	Russia

The women's coxless four competition at the 2017 World Rowing Championships in Sarasota took place in Nathan Benderson Park.

== Schedule ==
The schedule was as follows:

Date	Time	Round
Monday 25 September 2017	10:53	Heats
Wednesday 27 September 2017	11:25	Repechages
Saturday 30 September 2017	09:25	Final B
Saturday 30 September 2017	11:38	Final A

All times are Eastern Daylight Time (UTC-4)

== Results ==
=== Heats ===
Heat winners advanced directly to the A final. The remaining boats were sent to the repechages.

==== Heat 1 ====
Rank	Rowers	Country	Time	Notes
1	Lucy Stephan; Katrina Werry; Sarah Hawe; Molly Goodman	Australia	6:33.95	FA
2	Molly Bruggeman; Kristine O'Brien; Erin Reelick; Kendall Chase	United States	6:35.59	R
3	Olga Michalkiewicz; Joanna Dittmann; Monika Ciaciuch; Maria Wierzbowska	Poland	6:39.38	R
4	Monica Lanz; Aletta Jorritsma; José van Veen; Lies Rustenburg	Netherlands	6:39.53	R
5	Caragh McMurtry; Rebecca Girling; Rowan McKellar; Samantha Courty	Great Britain	6:40.60	R
6	Giorgia Pelacchi; Aisha Rocek; Carmela Pappalardo; Ludovica Serafini	Italy	6:50.27	R

==== Heat 2 ====
Rank	Rowers	Country	Time	Notes
1	Elena Oriabinskaia; Anastasia Tikhanova; Ekaterina Potapova; Alevtina Savkina	Russia	6:35.79	FA
2	Yue Wenxue; Guo Linlin; Zhang Min; Ju Rui	China	6:39.72	R
3	Lisa Roman; Susanne Grainger; Christine Roper; Nicole Hare	Canada	6:42.75	R
4	Cristina-Georgiana Popescu; Alina Ligia Pop; Beatrice-Madalina Parfenie; Roxana Parascanu	Romania	6:47.32	R
5	Alice Mayne; Adele Brosse; Pauline Bugnard; Flavie Bahuaud	France	6:47.73	R
6	Charlotte Spence; Elizabeth Ross; Kirstyn Goodger; Jackie Gowler	New Zealand	6:49.69	R

=== Repechages ===
The two fastest boats in each repechage advanced to the A final. The remaining boats were sent to the B final.

==== Repechage 1 ====
Rank	Rowers	Country	Time	Notes
1	Molly Bruggeman; Kristine O'Brien; Erin Reelick; Kendall Chase	United States	6:40.22	FA
2	Monica Lanz; Aletta Jorritsma; José van Veen; Lies Rustenburg	Netherlands	6:41.31	FA
3	Lisa Roman; Susanne Grainger; Christine Roper; Nicole Hare	Canada	6:46.61	FB
4	Giorgia Pelacchi; Aisha Rocek; Carmela Pappalardo; Ludovica Serafini	Italy	6:53.05	FB
5	Alice Mayne; Adele Brosse; Pauline Bugnard; Flavie Bahuaud	France	6:54.80	FB

==== Repechage 2 ====
Rank	Rowers	Country	Time	Notes
1	Yue Wenxue; Guo Linlin; Zhang Min; Ju Rui	China	6:41.43	FA
2	Olga Michalkiewicz; Joanna Dittmann; Monika Ciaciuch; Maria Wierzbowska	Poland	6:41.46	FA
3	Caragh McMurtry; Rebecca Girling; Rowan McKellar; Samantha Courty	Great Britain	6:47.38	FB
4	Charlotte Spence; Elizabeth Ross; Kirstyn Goodger; Jackie Gowler	New Zealand	6:52.66	FB
5	Cristina-Georgiana Popescu; Alina Ligia Pop; Beatrice-Madalina Parfenie; Roxana Parascanu	Romania	6:54.84	FB

=== Finals ===
The A final determined the rankings for places 1 to 6. Additional rankings were determined in the B final.

==== Final B ====
Rank	Rowers	Country	Time
1	Caragh McMurtry; Rebecca Girling; Rowan McKellar; Samantha Courty	Great Britain	6:36.18
2	Giorgia Pelacchi; Aisha Rocek; Carmela Pappalardo; Ludovica Serafini	Italy	6:39.94
3	Lisa Roman; Susanne Grainger; Christine Roper; Nicole Hare	Canada	6:40.20
4	Charlotte Spence; Elizabeth Ross; Kirstyn Goodger; Jackie Gowler	New Zealand	6:40.31
5	Cristina-Georgiana Popescu; Alina Ligia Pop; Beatrice-Madalina Parfenie; Roxana Parascanu	Romania	6:42.20
6	Alice Mayne; Adele Brosse; Pauline Bugnard; Flavie Bahuaud	France	6:42.44

==== Final A ====
Rank	Rowers	Country	Time
1st place, gold medalist(s)	Lucy Stephan; Katrina Werry; Sarah Hawe; Molly Goodman	Australia	6:33.58
2nd place, silver medalist(s)	Olga Michalkiewicz; Joanna Dittmann; Monika Ciaciuch; Maria Wierzbowska	Poland	6:34.25
3rd place, bronze medalist(s)	Elena Oriabinskaia; Anastasia Tikhanova; Ekaterina Potapova; Alevtina Savkina	Russia	6:34.67
4	Molly Bruggeman; Kristine O'Brien; Erin Reelick; Kendall Chase	United States	6:35.46
5	Monica Lanz; Aletta Jorritsma; José van Veen; Lies Rustenburg	Netherlands	6:36.44
6	Yue Wenxue; Guo Linlin; Zhang Min; Ju Rui	China	6:44.76
