= The Boat Race 2022 =

Cambridge vs Oxford rowing race

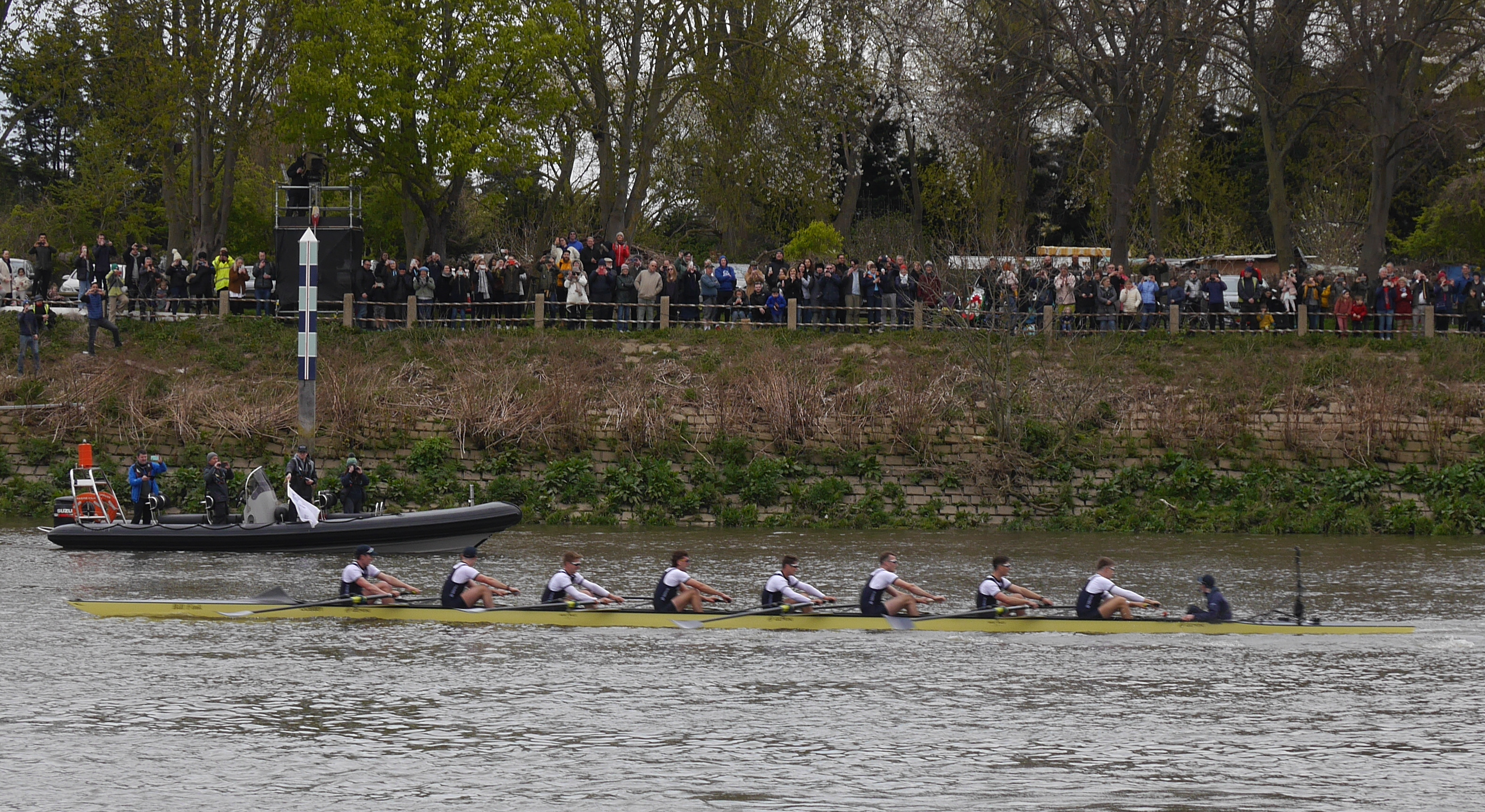
- Oxford winning the men's event
- Date: 3 April 2022

Men's race
- Winner: Oxford
- Margin of victory: 2¼ lengths
- Winning time: 16 minutes 42 seconds
- Overall record (Cambridge–Oxford): 85–81
- Umpire: Matthew Pinsent

Women's race
- Winner: Cambridge
- Margin of victory: 2¼ lengths
- Winning time: 18 minutes 23 seconds
- Overall record (Cambridge–Oxford): 46–30
- Umpire: John Garrett

Reserves' races
- Men's winners: Isis
- Women's winners: Blondie

The Boat Race 2022 was a side-by-side rowing race which took place on 3 April 2022. Held annually, The Boat Race is contested between crews from the universities of Oxford and Cambridge, usually along a 4.2-mile (6.8 km) tidal stretch of the River Thames, known as the Tideway, in south-west London. This was the 76th women's race and the 167th men's race. Cambridge led the longstanding rivalry 85–80 and 45–30 in the men's and women's races, respectively. The race returned to the Tideway after the previous year's race had taken place without spectators, on the River Great Ouse. This followed the cancellation of the 2020 race as a response to the COVID-19 pandemic in the United Kingdom.

The crews for both men's and women's boats were announced on 7 March 2022. The women's race was umpired by John Garrett who rowed for Cambridge University Boat Club in the Boat Race three times in the 1980s and who represented Great Britain at the Olympics in 1984, 1988 and 1992. The men's race was umpired by multiple Olympic gold-medallist Matthew Pinsent who rowed three times for Oxford University Boat Club in the early 1990s before umpiring the 2013 men's race and the 2018 women's race.

The women's race was won by Cambridge with a winning margin of two and a quarter lengths in a record time on the Tideway, which took the overall record in the women's race to 46–30 to Cambridge. Oxford won the men's race an hour later by the same margin, in the third-fastest time in history, resulting in the head-to-head record being 85–81 to Cambridge. Oxford's Isis won the men's reserve race while Blondie secured victory for Cambridge in the women's reserve race.

== Background ==
The Championship Course along which the races were conducted (historic names used)

The Boat Race is an annual side-by-side rowing competition between the University of Oxford (sometimes referred to as the "Dark Blues") and the University of Cambridge (sometimes referred to as the "Light Blues"). First held in 1829, the race usually takes place on the 4.2-mile (6.8 km) Championship Course, between Putney and Mortlake on the River Thames in south-west London. The rivalry is a major point of honour between the two universities; the race is broadcast worldwide. Cambridge entered the race as champions, having won the 2021 race, held on the River Great Ouse, by a margin of almost one length, and led overall with 85 victories to Oxford's 80 (excluding the 1877 race, a dead heat).

Taking place on 5 April 2022, it was the fifth time in the history of the Boat Race that men's and women's races were held on the same day and on the same course, this time along the Championship Course on the tidal stretch of the Thames, known as the Tideway. Before 2015, the women's race, which first took place in 1927, was usually held at the Henley Boat Races along the 2,000-metre (2,200 yd) course. However, on at least two occasions in the interwar period, the women competed on the Thames between Chiswick and Kew. Cambridge's women were also victorious in 2021 on the River Great Ouse course, winning by just under a length, which took the overall record in the Women's Boat Race to 45–30 in their favour.

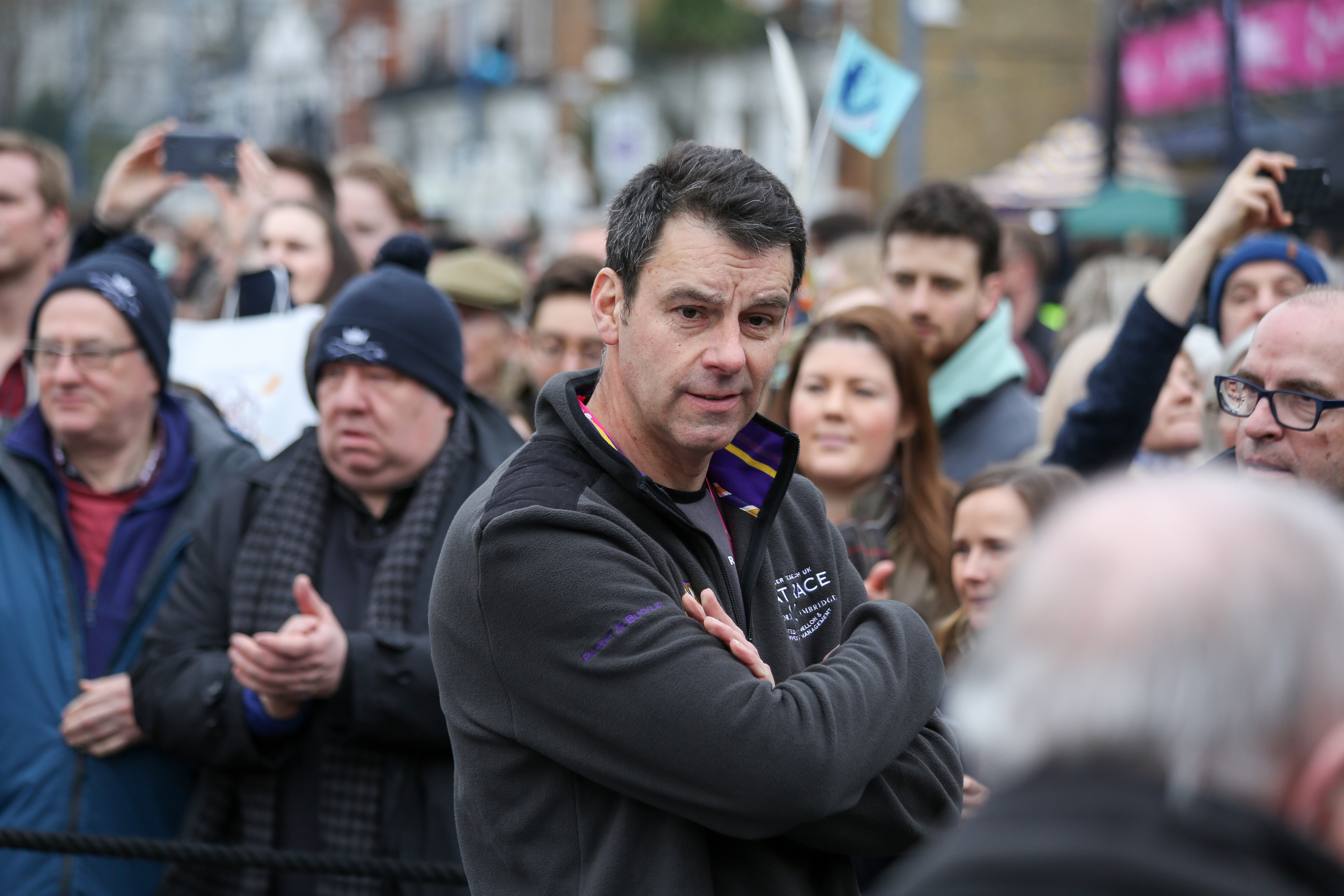
John Garrett (pictured in 2018) umpired the women's race.

The women's race was umpired by John Garrett who rowed for Cambridge University Boat Club (CUBC) in the Boat Race three times, in 1983, 1984 and 1985. He also represented Great Britain at the Olympics in 1984, 1988 and 1992. The men's race was umpired by multiple Olympic gold-medallist Matthew Pinsent, who won gold medals for Great Britain at four consecutive Olympics, between 1992 and 2004. As well as rowing for Oxford in the 1990, 1991 and 1993 races, he was assistant umpire in the 2012 race before umpiring the 2013 men's race and the 2018 women's race.

The autumn reception, at which the previous year's losing team challenges the winners to a rematch, was held on 18 November 2021. As Cambridge's women had won the previous year's race, it was Oxford's responsibility to offer the traditional challenge to Cambridge. To that end, Amelia Standing, president of Oxford University Women's Boat Club (OUWBC), challenged Bronya Sykes, her Cambridge counterpart. Cambridge's victory in the men's race meant that Martin Barakso, president of Oxford University Boat Club (OUBC), offered a challenge Charlie Marcus, president of CUBC.

In October 2021, the BBC announced that they would continue to broadcast the Boat Race in the United Kingdom after agreeing a four-year extension to their existing contract.

== Coaches ==
Sean Bowden was the chief coach for OUBC, having been responsible for the men's crew since 1997, winning 12 from the previous 18 races. A former Great Britain Olympic coach, he led the Light Blues in the 1993 and 1994 Boat Races. Bowden's assistant coach was Brendan Gliddon, a South African who formerly coached under-23 and Fédération Internationale du Sport Universitaire (FISU) teams for both South Africa and Great Britain. The OUWBC chief coach for the second year was Andy Nelder, who previously worked with Bowden and OUBC for eleven years. He was assisted by James Powell.

The Cambridge men's crew coaching team was led by their chief coach, Rob Baker, who had previously coached Cambridge's women to victories in both the 2017 and 2018 races. Cambridge women's chief coach was Patrick Ryan who joined as CUBC's women's assistant coach in 2013. CUBC's assistant coaches included Bill Lucas, Autumn Mantell and Nick Acock, with Henry Fieldman as the coxing coach and Donald Legget and James Cracknell performing supporting roles.

== Trials ==
Every year before Christmas, each squad stages a race between two of their eights over the Boat Race distance called Trial VIIIs. To minimise the risk of COVID-19 transmission, the previous year's trials took place on the River Great Ouse without spectators, but the trials for the 2022 race were restored to the Championship Course. Initially scheduled for 19 December 2021, the women's trials were postponed to January as a result of COVID cases in each squad, while the men's trials were unaffected.

=== Men ===
The OUBC men's trial boats were named Gondor and Rohan, after two of the fictional kingdoms in J. R. R. Tolkien's writings. The trial race took place at 1 p.m. on 19 December 2021 in clear and calm conditions, under the supervision of trials umpire Matt Smith, with Rohan occupying the Middlesex station and Gondor taking the Surrey side of the river. Rohan held a one-third of a length lead which was extended to almost a length by Fulham flats following aggressive steering from their cox, Jack Tottem. Gondor began to close the gap as the crews passed below Hammersmith Bridge but a push from Rohan took their lead to more than a length which they held onto to take the victory.

CUBC's men's trial also took place on 19 December 2021, starting 35 minutes after their Oxford counterparts. Burpees won the coin toss and took the Surrey station, leaving Mr Sleepy on the Middlesex side of the river. Following aggressive steering from their cox, President Charlie Marcus, Mr Sleepy took an early lead but Burpees were level before Smith was required to warn both crews for clashing oars. Burpees held a slight lead on the approach to Harrods Furniture Depository and, after a further blade clash, extended their advantage to two lengths by Barnes Bridge which they maintained to secure the win.

=== Women ===
CUBC's women's trial, umpired by John Garret, took place in calm conditions at 2:45 p.m. on 6 January 2022 between Woody and Buzz, named after Ryan's dogs. After an early clash of blades, Woody took a three-quarter length lead which they extended to nearly a length by the Mile Post. Buzz responded and by Hammersmith Bridge had reduced the deficit to one third of a length before Woody pushed on to restore a one-length lead by St Paul's School. Under Barnes Bridge, Buzz started to gain on Woody but the latter replied and sprinted to the finish to secure a victory of just under one length.

The OUWBC women's trial was conducted between Speed and Style, named in tribute to the manner in which the inaugural women's race in 1927 was judged. (Note: In the 1927 Women's Boat Race, the crews were forbidden from racing side-by-side, and the winners were judged "rowing down stream for style and back again for speed" along the course "from the Free Ferry from the top of Iffley Reach to the Keble barge".) Speed took the Surrey station leaving the Middlesex side of the river to Style. Speed took an early lead but, following warnings to both crews from the umpire to avoid a clash, Style held a one-third length lead by the Mile Post. At Chiswick Eyot, the lead was down to one quarter of a length but Speed recovered better from an oar clash to hold a one-length advantage by Barnes Bridge. Despite a late push from Style, Speed held its lead to win the trial by around a length.

== Build-up ==
The official fixtures to be conducted in advance of The Boat Race were announced on 27 January 2022. The opponents included crews from Leander Club, Oxford Brookes University Boat Club, Imperial College Boat Club, the University of Washington and Nereus Rowing Club from the Netherlands.

== Crews ==
The crews for both men's and women's boats were announced on 7 March 2022, at The Mandarin Oriental, Knightsbridge. According to Paddy Power, the Irish bookmaker, the Cambridge women were considered strong favourites to win their race while Oxford's men were heavily favoured to win.

=== Women ===
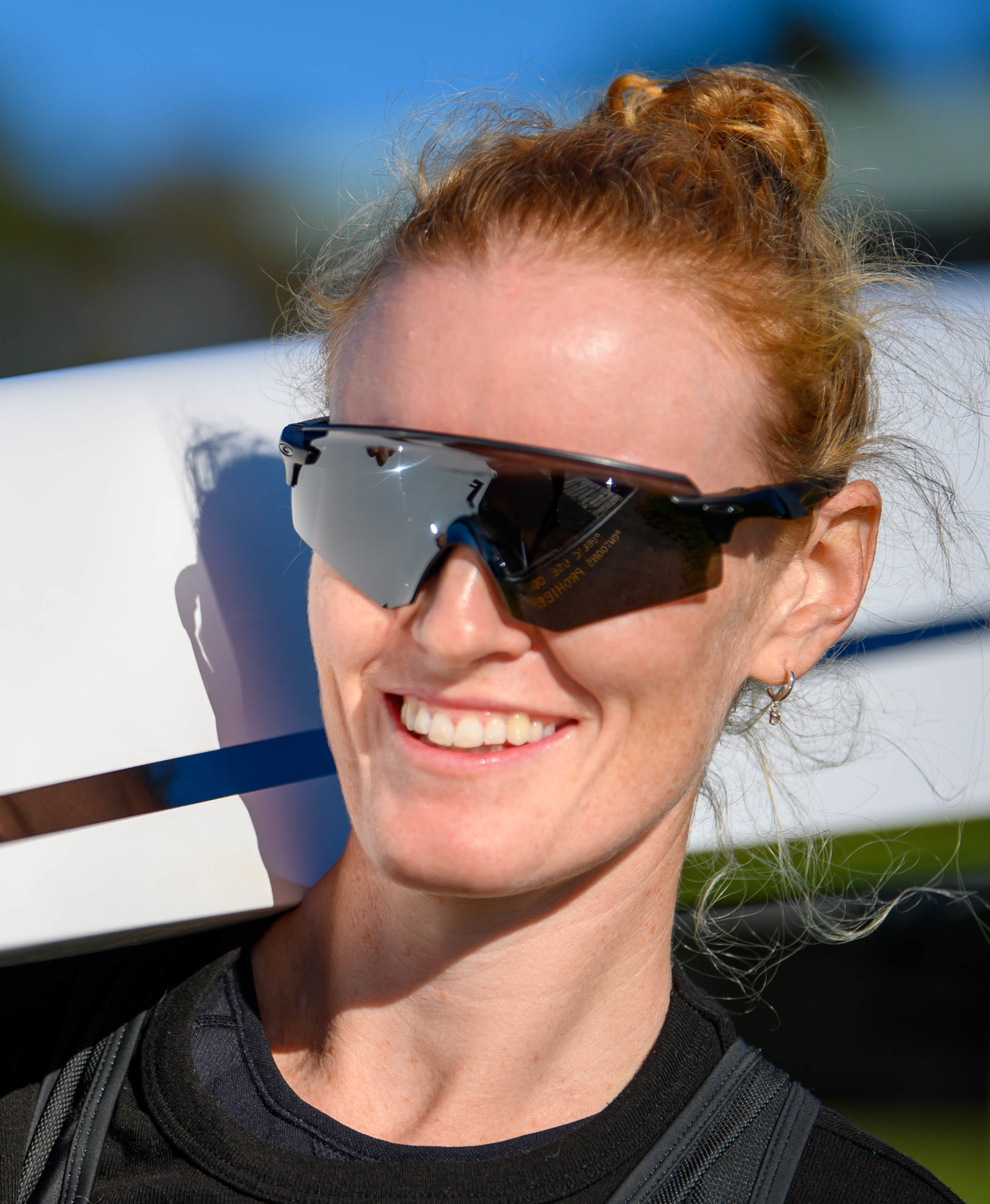
Grace Prendergast (pictured in 2021) rowed for Cambridge.

Oxford's crew included Gabrielle Smith who represented Canada in the double sculls at the 2020 Summer Olympics, and American Erin Reelick who won the gold at the 2018 World Rowing Championships in the coxless four. Anastasia Posner returned to the OUWBC crew to win her fifth blue, having represented Oxford between 2013 and 2016. The CUBC boat featured New Zealand Olympian Ruby Tew who was part of the crew which finished fourth at the 2016 games in the eight. She was joined by countrywoman Grace Prendergast, who secured gold in the coxless pair and silver in the eight at the Tokyo Olympics, and Imogen Grant, who finished fourth for Great Britain in the lightweight double sculls in the 2020 games.

Women's crews
Seat	Oxford			Cambridge		
Seat	Name	Nationality	College	Name	Nationality	College
Bow	Anja Zehfuss	American	Green Templeton	Adriana Perez Rotondo	Spanish	Newnham
2	Christine Cavallo	American	St Anne's	Sarah Portsmouth	British	Newnham
3	Amelia Standing (P)	British	St Anne's	Paige Badenhorst	South African	Magdalene
4	Julia Lindsay	Canadian	St Cross	Ruby Tew	New Zealand	Queens'
5	Gabrielle Smith	Canadian	Regents Park	Bronya Sykes (P)	British	Gonville and Caius
6	Anastasia Posner	British	Pembroke	Caoimhe Dempsey	Irish	Newnham
7	Annie Anezakis	Australian	Lady Margaret Hall	Grace Prendergast	New Zealand	Queens'
Stroke	Erin Reelick	American	New	Imogen Grant	British	Trinity
Cox	Joe Gellet	British	St Anne's	Jasper Parish	British/Canadian	Clare
(P) – Boat club president

=== Men ===
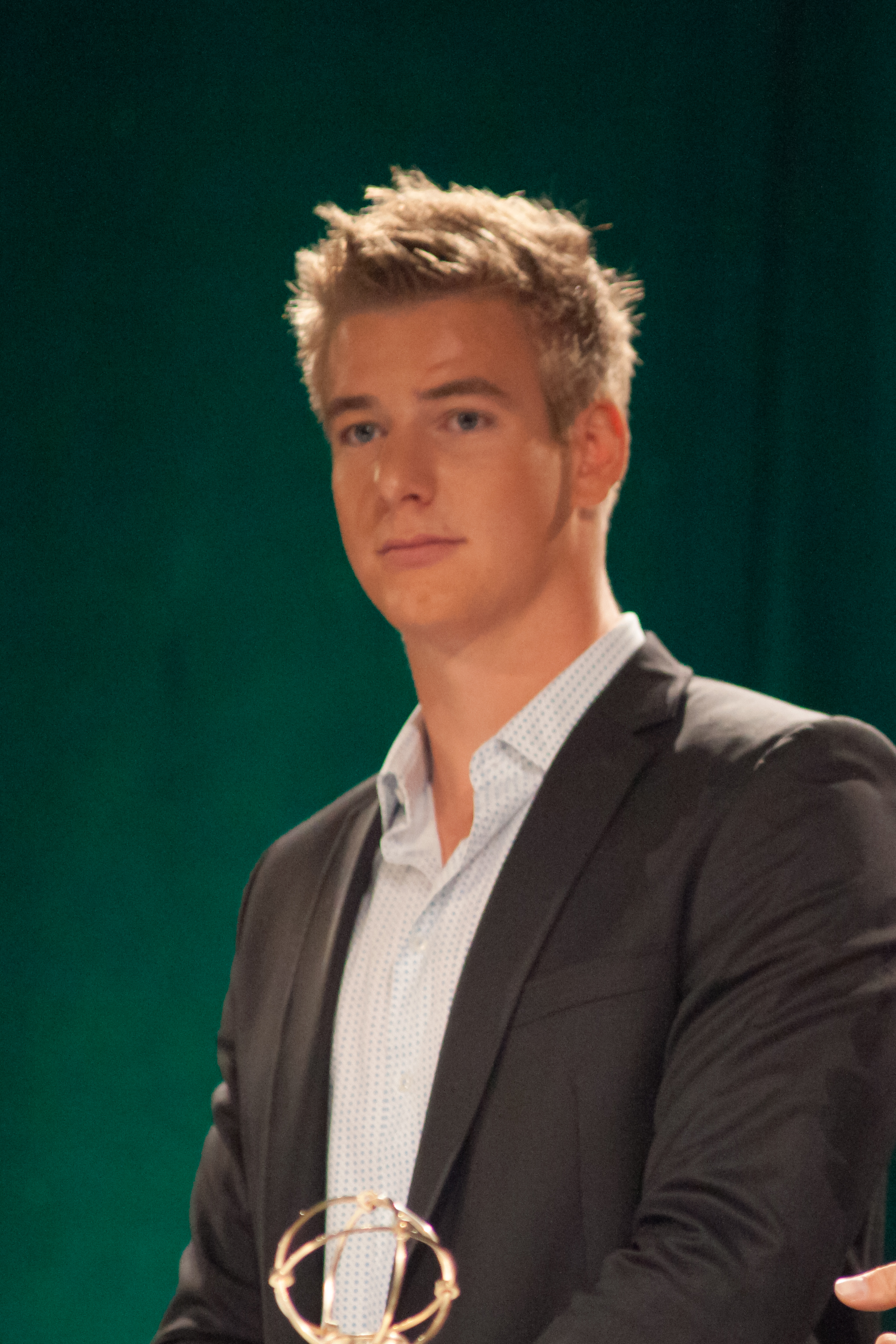
Barnabé Delarze (pictured in 2014) rowed for Oxford.

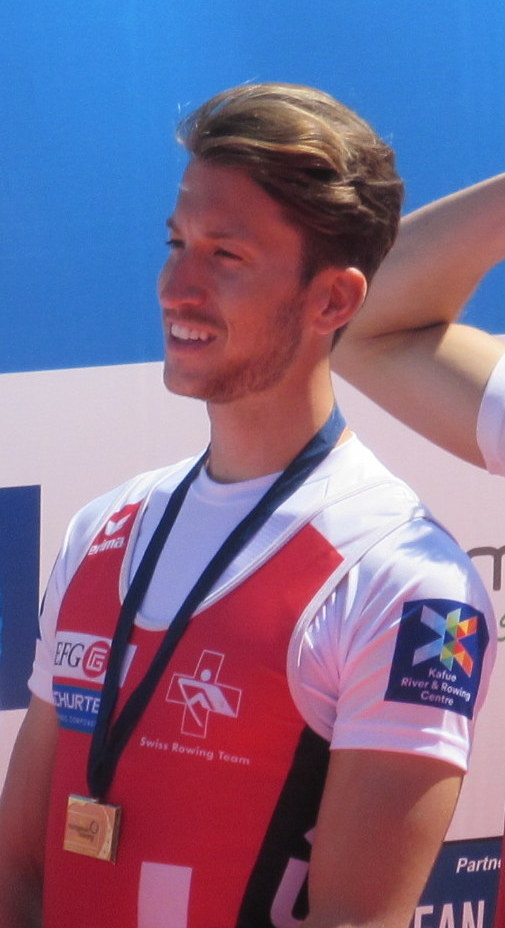
Simon Schürch (pictured in 2016) represented Cambridge.

Five Olympic rowers were selected within Oxford's crew: Barnabé Delarze and Roman Röösli both participated in the quadruple sculls representing Switzerland in the 2016 games, American Liam Corrigan was a member of his country's eight in Tokyo, while Angus Groom and Charles Elwes rowed for Great Britain in 2016 and 2020 respectively, the latter winning a bronze medal in the eight. Elwes's Olympic crew-mates, Thomas George and Oliver Wynne-Griffith rowed for CUBC, along with New Zealand Olympian James Hunter, and Swiss Olympic champion Simon Schürch who secured gold in the lightweight coxless four.

Men's crews
Seat	Oxford			Cambridge		
Seat	Name	Nationality	College	Name	Nationality	College
Bow	Liam Corrigan	American	Oriel	Luca Ferraro	British	King's
2	David Ambler	British	Jesus	Jamie Hunter	New Zealand	St Catharine's
3	Barnabé Delarze	Swiss	Christ Church	George Finlayson	Australian	Peterhouse
4	Jack Robertson	Australian	Green Templeton	Simon Schürch	Swiss	St Edmund's
5	Roman Röösli	Swiss	St Peter's	James Bernard	American	St Edmund's
6	Charlie Elwes	British	Oriel	Tom George	British	Peterhouse
7	Angus Groom	British	St Catherine's	Ollie Wynne-Griffith	British	Peterhouse
Stroke	Tobias Schröder	British/Estonian	Exeter	Ollie Parish	British/Canadian	Peterhouse
Cox	Jack Tottem	British	Brasenose	Charlie Marcus (P)	British	Trinity
(P) – Boat club president: Martin Barakso was the non-rowing President of OUBC

== Races ==
Conditions on race day were overcast with calm water.

=== Women's ===
Oxford won the toss, electing to start on the Surrey side of the river, and the race commenced around 2:25 p.m. Cambridge made the quicker start and were half a length ahead by the Mile Post, despite their cox Jasper Parish receiving multiple warnings from the umpire for encroaching on Oxford's line. Four minutes into the race, Cambridge took a clear-water lead and moved across in front of Oxford, again being warned by Garrett. Although OUWBC reduced the deficit on the approach to Hammersmith Bridge, CUBC pulled away to take the victory by two and a quarter lengths. Oxford's cox Joe Gellet lodged a protest over the perceived aggressive steering of his counterpart, but the umpire allowed the result to stand. It was Cambridge's fifth consecutive victory and took the overall record in the event to 46–30 in their favour. Their winning time of 18 minutes 22 seconds was the fastest on record for women's races held on the Tideway.

=== Men's ===
Cambridge won the toss and took the Middlesex station, handing Oxford the Surrey side, traditionally favoured by crews. (Note: The crew winning the toss more often than not elects to start the race from the Surrey station as it affords them the inside of the bend round Hammersmith and Chiswick Reach.) The race started around 3:26 p.m. and after an even start, Oxford took a narrow lead as the boats passed Craven Cottage. Rowing into a strengthening headwind, the Dark Blues extended their advantage to be clear of the Light Blues by the time the crews shot Hammersmith Bridge. As the boats passed under Barnes Bridge, Oxford's lead was more than two lengths. They passed the finish line in a time of 16 minutes 42 seconds, the third-fastest time in the history of the race, with an advantage of two and a quarter lengths. It was Oxford's first victory in six years and took the overall record in the event to 85–81 in Cambridge's favour.

=== Reserves ===
CUBC's Blondie beat Oxford's Osiris in the 50th women's reserve boat race by two and three-quarter lengths. In the 57th men's reserve race, OUBC's Isis secured a three-and-a-half-length victory over CUBC's Goldie.

== Reaction ==
CUBC women's rower Bronya Sykes remarked that "It was insane, it was fast, it was emotion, all in one go. Jasper [Parish] did a phenomenal job coxing there." Parish himself stated that he "took a risk early on that paid off as the race went on". His counterpart Gellett noted that "I'd say it was a very aggressive approach to steering the line, and the course ... There was a point where I thought it had gone against what’s stated in the rules. So I thought I'd challenge that."

OUBC's cox Tottem said that "everything we’ve talked about, everything we’ve worked towards, it’s been six, seven months with this team and it’s been a dream for all of us. I’ve been watching the Boat Race for 10 years so to put in that kind of performance means a lot." His stroke, Tobias Schröder, added that "the plan was always to go out hard and win the race from the start." Their coach, Bowden, reflected on recent events: "It's been tough in recent years, what with the 2020 race being cancelled, then not performing as we would have wished last year, so this was a huge result". Oxford's number 7, Groom, said he "felt we had control of the race by about Hammersmith Bridge ... Cambridge pushed back, but we responded. From that point on, we had that extra bit of belief."

== Bibliography ==
- The Boat Race. The Boat Race Company Limited. March 2022.
