= Boxberger =

Boxberger may refer to any of the following people:

- Brad Boxberger (born 1988), American professional baseball pitcher
- Erin Boxberger (born 1993), American rower
- Helmi Boxberger (born 1950), German swimmer
- Jacky Boxberger (1949–2001), French track and field athlete
- Rod Boxberger (born 1957), American professional baseball pitcher
