= Caitlin Cronin =

Australian rower (born 1995)

Personal information
- Born: 22 March 1995 (age 31) Brisbane
- Years active: 2014–present

Sport
- Sport: Rowing
- Club: Uni Queensland Boat Club

Achievements and titles
- National finals: Queen's Cup 2016–18,22; Austn Champion 4X 2021
Medal record
Women's rowing
Representing Australia
Olympic Games
Bronze medal – third place	2020 Tokyo	Quad scull
U23 World Championships
Silver medal – second place	2017 Plovdiv	BW4X

Caitlin Cronin (born 22 March 1995) is an Australian national representative rower. She is a national champion, won a silver medal at 2017 World U23 Championships and is an Olympian. She stroked the Australian women's quad scull at Tokyo 2021 to a bronze medal.

== Club and state rowing ==
Raised in Queensland, Cronin's Australian club rowing has been from the Brisbane & GPS Rowing Club in Brisbane and the University of Queensland Boat Club.

Cronin made her first state representative appearance for Queensland in the 2014 youth eight which contested and won The Bicentennial Cup at that year's Interstate Regatta. In 2015 she again represented in the Queensland women's youth eight. She first made the Queensland women's senior eight in 2016 and rowed in those crews contesting the Queen's Cup at the Interstate Regattas in 2016, 2017, 2018 and 2022. She stroked the 2018 Queensland crew. In 2021 she won the silver medal as the Queensland representative to race for the Nell Slatter Trophy - the women's single scull event at the Interstate Regatta. In 2023 she again placed second as the Victorian entrant contesting the interstate single scull title.

Cronin contested U23 Australian national titles in all three sculling boat classes at the 2016 and 2017 Australian Rowing Championships. She won the U23 national championship in the quad in 2016 and in a double scull in 2017. She raced in the open class in UQBC colours from 2018 placing 2nd in the double-scull in both 2018 and 2021. In 2021 she won her first Australian senior national title in a composite quad with her Australian representative teammates Meredith, Hudson and Thompson.

== International representative rowing ==
Cronin made her Australian representative debut at the 2016 World Rowing U23 Championships in Rotterdam where she rowed in the Australian quad scull to a sixth-place finish.

In 2017 she was selected in the Australian senior quad scull with Rowena Meredith, Leah Saunders and Genevieve Horton and they won medals at two World Rowing Cups in Europe. With Harriet Hudson changed out for Saunders they were eligible to compete underage and raced to a silver medal at the World Rowing U23 Championships in Plovdiv, Bulgaria. Saunders came back into the crew for the 2017 World Rowing Championships in Sarasota, Florida. The young crew took on a tightly packed field in the final at Sarasota and were fourth at the halfway mark with Poland in the lead followed by The Netherlands. As the crews sprinted for the line, the Australian quad featuring three senior team debutantes other than Horton, dropped back and finished in sixth place.

Cronin and the quad stayed together into 2018 with Olympia Aldersey changed out for Saunders. At the 2018 World Rowing Cup II in Linz, they rowed to a bronze medal and then a sixth placing at the WRC III in Lucerne. At the 2018 World Rowing Championships in Plovdiv they finished in seventh place.

Cronin was out of the Australian quad in 2019 when they raced at World Cups and the World Championships and failed to qualify the boat for Tokyo. Before those delayed Tokyo Olympics at the final Olympic qualification regatta in Lucerne, Switzerland in May 2021 Cronin was back in the boat with Meredith, Harriet Hudson and Ria Thompson. They raced as Australian representative heavyweight quad, making a final attempt to qualify that boat. Victory in their heat and final saw them secure an Olympic berth. In Tokyo Cronin stroked the Australian quad. They placed fourth in their heat and then won the repechage to make the A final. They were behind the lead for much of the race but winds had blown up before the event and some crews struggled with their bladework in the chop. The Australian quad kept their composure and excellent technique and managed a bronze medal finish on the line.

In March 2023 Cronin was again selected with Hudson, Thompson and Meredith as Australia's quad-scull for the 2023 international season. At the Rowing World Cup II in Varese, Italy they raced as Australia's W4X entrant. They made the B final and finished in overall eighth place. At 2023's RWC III in Lucerne, with Kathryn Rowan changed out for Ria Thompson, Cronin again raced in Australia's W4X. Again they finished 2nd in the B final for an overall eighth placing. At the 2023 World Rowing Championships in Belgrade Serbia, Cronin, Hudson, Rowan and Meredith were selected to race Australia's quad scull. They placed third in their heat and then 3rd in the A/B semi-final at which point they qualified an Australian W4X boat for the 2024 Paris Olympics. In the A final the quad finished fifth, giving them a fifth place world ranking from the regatta.
