= Monika Chabel =

Polish rower (born 1992)

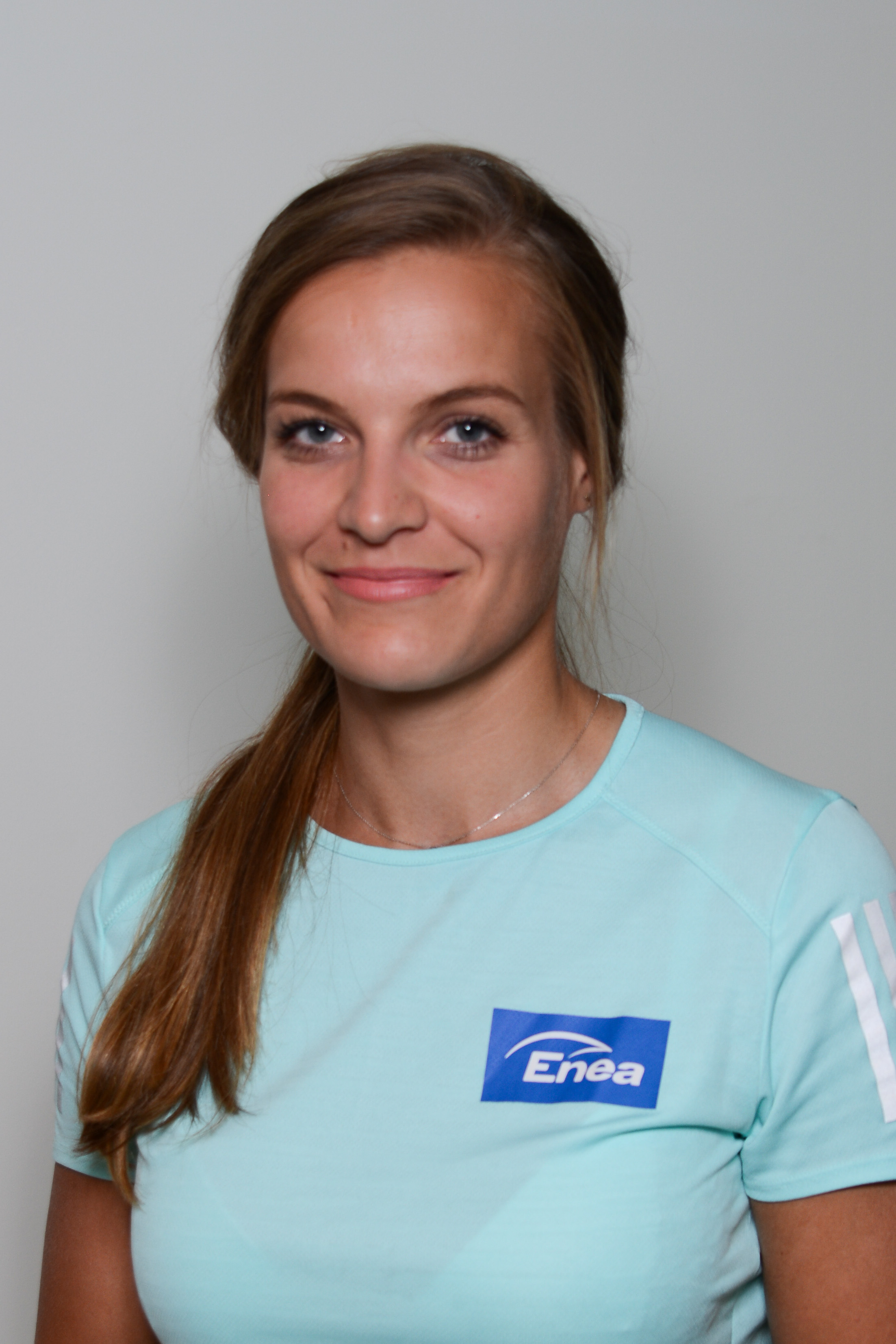
- Chabel in May 2018

Personal information
- Born: 10 May 1992 (age 34) Ślesin, Kuyavian-Pomeranian Voivodeship, Poland
- Height: 1.82 m (6 ft 0 in)
- Weight: 74 kg (163 lb)

Sport
- Country: Poland
- Sport: Rowing

Achievements and titles
- Olympic finals: Rio 2016 W4X; Tokyo 2020 W4-
Medal record
Women's rowing
Representing Poland
Event	1st	2nd	3rd
Olympic Games	0	0	1
World Championships	0	1	0
European Championships	0	3	3
Total	0	4	4
Olympic Games
Bronze medal – third place	2016 Rio de Janeiro	Quadruple sculls
World Championships
Silver medal – second place	2017 Sarasota	Coxless four
European Championships
Silver medal – second place	2016 Brandenburg	Quadruple sculls
Silver medal – second place	2017 Račice	Coxless four
Bronze medal – third place	2014 Belgrade	Quadruple sculls
Bronze medal – third place	2015 Poznań	Quadruple sculls
Bronze medal – third place	2018 Glasgow	Coxless four
Bronze medal – third place	2019 Lucerne	Coxless four

Monika Chabel (Polish pronunciation: [mɔˈɲika ˈt͡ɕat͡ɕux ˈxabɛl]; born 10 May 1992) is a Polish representative rower. She is a dual Olympian and an Olympic medalist.

== Personal ==
Ciaciuch was born in the small village of Ślesin, Kuyavian-Pomeranian Voivodeship which has a population of about 1500. In October 2017 she married a Polish rower Wiktor Chabel.

== Rowing career ==
Ciaciuch competed in the women's quadruple sculls event at the 2016 Summer Olympics, winning the bronze medal. In 2021 she raced in the Polish coxless four at the Tokyo 2020 Olympics. That crew made the Olympic final and finished in sixth place.
