= Charlotte Sutherland (rower) =

Australian rower

Personal information
- Born: 26 June 1991 (age 35)

Sport
- Sport: Rowing
Medal record
Women's rowing
Representing Australia
World Championships
Bronze medal – third place	2013 Chungju	W4-
U23 World Championships
Gold medal – first place	U23 2013 Linz	W4-

Charlotte Sutherland (born 26 June 1991) is an Australian rower. She was an U23 World Champion, a national champion and a 2016 Olympian.

== Club and state rowing ==
Charlotte was raised in Corryong in northern Victoria. She attended Geelong Grammar School with her twin sister Sophie and took up rowing in 2007. She rowed in the Geelong Grammar Girl's first VIIIs which won the Victorian Head of the River in 2008 and 2009. In those years she also contested the national Schoolgirl Eights title at the Australian Rowing Championships.

Her senior club rowing has been from the Mercantile Rowing Club.

Sutherland was first selected to represent Victoria in the women's youth eight in 2011 contesting the Bicentennial Cup at the Interstate Regatta within the Australian Rowing Championships. From 2014 to 2016 she rowed in consecutive successful Victorian eights who contested and won the Queen's Cup at the Interstate Regatta. She stroked two of those eights to victory - 2015 and 2016.

In Mercantile colours she has contested national championship titles at the Australian Rowing Championships on numerous occasions. In 2012 she contested the U23 coxless pair and U23 eight titles. In 2013 and 2014 she competed for the coxless pair. In 2015 she won the Australian coxless four and eights championship titles in all-Mercantile crews.

== International representative rowing ==
Sutherland debuted as an Australian representative in 2013. She rowed in the senior women's eight who took gold at the World Rowing Cup I in Sydney and also competed in a coxless pair at that regatta. Half of World Cup eight were selected as a coxless four to compete at the 2013 World Rowing U23 Championships and in the lead up preparation they competed and won silver at the WRC III in Lucerne. At the 2013 U23 World Championships with Alexandra Hagan and Hannah Vermeersch and stroked by Lucy Stephan, Sutherland won gold and an U23 World Championship title. Two months later that same four raced as Australia's senior women's coxless four at the 2013 World Rowing Championships in Chungju, Korea and took a bronze medal. All members of the four also doubled-up in the senior women's eight with Stephan seated at seven and they placed fifth in that event in Chungju.

In 2014 Sutherland rowed in a coxless pair with Lucy Stephan. They raced at the World Rowing Cup I in Sydney and then at WRC III in Lucerne before taking the pair to the 2014 World Rowing Championships in Amsterdam where they placed fifth. Sutherland regained a seat and was selected at stroke in the Australian senior women's eight in 2015 and raced at two Rowing World Cups in Europe and then up the stern end of the eight for the 2015 World Rowing Championships in Aiguebelette. They failed to make the A final and finished in overall eight place.

Sutherland was the stroke of the Australian women's eight who initially missed qualification for the 2016 Rio Olympics but received a late call up following the Russian drug scandal. WADA had discovered Russian state sponsored drug testing violations and the IOC acted to protect clean athletes and set strict entry guidelines for Russian athletes resulting in most of their rowers and nearly all of their crews being withdrawn from the Olympic regatta. The crew had dispersed two months earlier after their failure to qualify but reconvened, travelled at the last minute to Rio and borrowed a shell. They finished last in their heat, last in the repechage and were eliminated.
