= Rosemary Popa =

Australian and American rower

Rosemary Popa OAM
Personal information
- Nickname: Rosie
- Nationality: Australian
- Citizenship: Australia; United States
- Born: 30 December 1991 (age 34) Melbourne, Victoria, Australia
- Education: Caulfield Grammar School
- Years active: 2005–
- Height: 1.80 m (5 ft 11 in)
- Relative(s): Susan Chapman (mother); Ion Popa (father)

Sport
- Country: Australia
- Sport: Rowing
- Event: Eight
- University team: University of California, Berkeley
- Club: Banks Rowing Club
Medal record
Women's rowing
Representing Australia
Olympic Games
Gold medal – first place	2020 Tokyo	Coxless four
World Championships
Silver medal – second place	2019 Ottensheim	Eight
Bronze medal – third place	2018 Plovdiv	Eight

Rosemary Popa OAM (born 30 December 1991) is an Australian national champion rower, Olympic gold medalist, and former rower for the University of California, Berkeley. A dual citizen of Australia and the United States, she has represented both countries at World Rowing Championships, twice winning medals for Australia. She won the Remenham Challenge Cup at the 2018 Henley Royal Regatta in the Australian women's eight. In 2021, she was selected to represent Australia in the coxless four event at the delayed 2020 Summer Olympics, where she won the gold medal.

== Personal ==
Born in Melbourne, Victoria, both of Popa's parents were Australian Olympic medallists in rowing. Her father Ion Popa had rowed for Romania before defecting to Australia in 1978. He was a 1986 world champion, a dual Olympian and won bronze in the Australian men's eight at the 1984 Los Angeles Olympics. Rosemary's US born mother Susan Chapman won Australia's first Olympic medal in women's rowing – a bronze in the coxed four at Los Angeles.

== Club and college rowing ==
Rosemary Popa was educated at Caulfield Grammar School where she took up rowing. Her senior club rowing in Melbourne was from the Banks Rowing Club. Her father Ion had a long association with Banks Rowing club.

Popa first made state selection for Victoria in the 2009 youth eight contesting the Bicentennial Cup at the Interstate Regatta within the Australian Rowing Championships. She rowed again in the Victorian youth eight in 2010.

Popa won a scholarship to the University of California, Berkeley and rowed for the California Golden Bears at the NCAA Championships in 2011, 2012, 2013 and 2014 graduating with a degree in Sociology in 2014. She won the pair at the 2012 US U23 World Championships trials. She finished fourth in the varsity eight at the 2011 NCAA Championships and finished fifth in the varsity eight at the 2012 NCAA Championships. In 2011 she won gold in the UC varsity eight at the 2011 Pac-10 championships.

Following her return to Australia, Popa was selected in the 2018 Victorian state women's senior eight to contest the Queen's Cup at the Interstate Regatta within the Australian Rowing Championships. She crewed that Victorian eight in its 2018 Queen's Cup victory. That year she also crewed a composite Australian selection eight who won the women's eight title at the Australian Rowing Championships and in a composite Australian selection four she won the 2018 women's coxless four national title.

In 2019 Popa was in the Victorian senior women's eight who were finally beaten in the Queen's Cup by New South Wales after a fourteen year Victorian hold. In 2021 she stroked the Victorian women's eight to a Queen's Cup victory.

== International representative rowing ==
=== United States ===
Popa made her United States representative debut in a quad scull at the 2011 World Rowing U23 Championships in Amsterdam where she rowed to a seventh place. In 2012 she raced again for the US in a coxless pair at the World Rowing U23 Championships in Trakai for an overall eighth-place finish. She contested the 2014 World Rowing Cup I in Sydney racing for the US in a coxless pair to seventh place.

=== Australia ===
Popa came into Australian selection contention in 2015. She was vying for a seat in the Australian women's eight and the coxless four. She raced in both boats at two World Rowing Cups that year. At the 2015 World Rowing Championships in Aiguebelette she rowed in the four seat of the Australian eight to second in the B final for an overall seventh-place finish.

The Australian women's coxless four of 2017 had great success that year. Molly Goodman, Lucy Stephan, Katrina Werry, and Sarah Hawe didn't lose a race in the international season and rowed to a gold medal at the 2017 World Rowing Championships. In 2018 Katrina Werry was changed out for Popa and the world champion four started their 2018 international campaign with a gold medal win at the World Rowing Cup II in Linz, Austria. In their second competitive outing of the 2018 international season in an Australian selection eight and racing as the Georgina Hope Rinehart National Training Centre, after Rowing Australia patron, Gina Rinehart, Popa won the 2018 Remenham Challenge Cup at the Henley Royal Regatta. The following week back in the coxless four, Popa won another gold at the World Rowing Cup III in Lucerne. A subsequent rib injury to Popa though saw her swapped out of the women's coxless four for the 2018 World Championships for Kat Werry and put back into the Australian women's eight. At those championships in Plovdiv the Australian eight with Popa at three, won their heat and placed third in the final winning the bronze medal.

In 2019 Popa was again picked in Australian women's sweep squad for the international season. She rowed in the five seat of the Australian women's eight to a gold medal win at Rowing World Cup II in Poznan and to a silver medal at WRC III in Rotterdam. Popa was then selected to race in Australia's women's eight at the 2019 World Rowing Championships in Linz, Austria. The eight were looking for a top five finish at the 2019 World Championships to qualify for the Tokyo Olympics. They placed second in their heat, came through the repechage and led in the final from the start and at all three 500m marks till they were overrun by New Zealand by 2.7secs. The Australian eight took the silver medal and qualified for Tokyo 2020.

By the time of national team selections in 2021 for the delayed Tokyo Olympics, Popa had forced her way back into the Australian coxless four, which had qualified for the Olympics on 2019 performances. Popa was selected to race that boat with Annabelle McIntyre and the experienced Olympians Lucy Stephan and Jessica Morrison. This combination had won the 2021 Australian national title in the women's coxless four. In Tokyo the four won their heat rowed two hours after Morrison and McIntyre's heat in the pair, and progressed straight to the A final. In the final they led from the start, were challenged hard to the finish by the Dutch crew but took the gold in an Olympic best time.

In the 2022 Australia Day Honours Popa was awarded the Medal of the Order of Australia.
