= Lucy Stephan =

Australian rower (born 1991)

Lucy Stephan OAM
Personal information
- Nationality: Australian
- Born: 10 December 1991 (age 34) Nhill, Victoria, Australia
- Height: 174 cm (5 ft 9 in)
- Weight: 67 kg (148 lb)

Sport
- Country: Australia
- Sport: Rowing
- Event(s): Eight, coxless four

Achievements and titles
- Olympic finals: 2016 Rio de Janeiro; 2020 Tokyo
- National finals: Queen's Cup 2012–18, 21–22
Medal record
Women's rowing
Representing Australia
Olympic Games
Gold medal – first place	2020 Tokyo	Coxless four
World Championships
Gold medal – first place	2017 Sarasota	Coxless four
Gold medal – first place	2019 Ottensheim	Coxless four
Silver medal – second place	2018 Plovdiv	Coxless four
Bronze medal – third place	2013 Chungju	Coxless four
Bronze medal – third place	2022 Račice	Coxless four

Lucy Stephan OAM (born 10 December 1991) is an Australian rower. She is a multiple Australian champion, a 2016 and 2020 Olympian and a world champion who won a 2017 world title in the coxless four and regained that same world title in 2019. At the Tokyo 2020 Olympics she balanced the boat from the bow seat of the Australian coxless four to a gold medal victory. She won the Remenham Challenge Cup at the 2018 Henley Royal Regatta in the Australian women's eight.

== Club and state rowing ==
Raised in the Victorian country town of Nhill, Stephan's senior rowing was from the Melbourne University Boat Club. She attended Ballarat Grammar in Victoria, where she found her passion for rowing. Stephan graduated in 2009.

Stephan was first selected to represent Victoria in the women's youth eight in 2011 contesting the Bicentennial Cup at the Interstate Regatta within the Australian Rowing Championships. From 2012 to 2018 she rowed in Victoria's seven consecutive successful senior women's eights who won the Queen's Cup at the Interstate Regatta within the Australian Rowing Championships. She stroked those Victorian eights to victory in 2013, 2014, 2017 and 2018. In 2021, 2022 and 2023 she was again in Victorian women's eights for their successive Queen's Cup victories, she stroked the 2023 crew.

At the Australian Rowing Championships in 2022 she won another national title – the women's eight – in a composite Australian selection crew. With Katrina Werry she won the women's national coxless pair titles at the 2022 and 2023 Australian Rowing Championships. At the 2023 Australian Rowing Championships she also won the coxless four national title in an all MUBC crew.

== International representative rowing ==
Stephan was first selected for Australian representation in a coxless four contesting the 2012 World Rowing U23 Championships in Trakai, Lithuania. Stephan stroked the four to a silver medal. The following year at the 2013 U23 World Championships in Linz, Stephan again stroked the Australian coxless four. With Charlotte Sutherland, Alexandra Hagan and Hannah Vermeersch, Stephan won gold and an U23 World Championship title. Two months later that same four raced as Australia's senior women's coxless four at the 2013 World Rowing Championships in Chungju, Korea and took a bronze medal. All members of the four also doubled-up in the senior women's eight with Stephan at stroke and they placed fifth in that event in Chungju.

In 2014 Stephan rowed in a coxless pair with Charlotte Sutherland. They raced at the World Rowing Cup I in Sydney and then at WRC III in Lucerne before taking the pair to the 2014 World Rowing Championships in Amsterdam where they placed fifth. Stephan secured a seat in the Australian senior women's eight in 2015 and raced at two Rowing World Cups in Europe and then in the bow seat of the eight at the 2015 World Rowing Championships in Aiguebelette who failed to make the A final and finished in overall eight place.

Stephan was a member of the Australian women's eight who initially missed qualification for the 2016 Rio Olympics but received a late call up following the Russian drug scandal. WADA had discovered Russian state sponsored drug testing violations and the IOC acted to protect clean athletes and set strict entry guidelines for Russian athletes resulting in most of their rowers and nearly all of their crews being withdrawn from the Olympic regatta. The crew had dispersed two months earlier after their failure to qualify but reconvened, travelled at the last minute to Rio and borrowed a shell. They finished last in their heat, last in the repechage and were eliminated.

After the Olympics Stephan continued to compete at the highest level and in 2017 she was selected at bow in Australia's coxless four with Molly Goodman, Katrina Werry, and Sarah Hawe. They competed at the World Rowing Cups II and III and as a crew, they didn't lose a race in the international season. At the 2017 World Rowing Championships in Sarasota, Florida it was to be no different. They won their heat and started slow in the final, sitting in sixth place through the 500m and at fifth place at the 1000m mark. At the 1500m mark, they began to push on the Dutch and were joined by Poland and Russia, all challenging for the podium. In the final sprint, Stephan called Goodman to up the rating and at 43 strokes per minute, the Australian four surged to the lead to claim gold and the world championship title ahead of Poland and Russia.

With Katrina Werry changed out for Rosemary Popa the world champion four stayed together into 2018 and started their 2018 international campaign with a gold medal win at the World Rowing Cup II in Linz, Austria. In their second competitive outing of the 2018 international season in an Australian selection eight and racing as the Georgina Hope Rinehart National Training Centre, after Rowing Australia patron, Gina Rinehart, Stephan won the 2018 Remenham Challenge Cup at the Henley Royal Regatta. The following week back in the coxless four, Stephan won another gold at the World Rowing Cup III in Lucerne. By the time of 2018 World Rowing Championships Popa was out of the four with a rib injury and Kat Werry back in. Seated as they had been in 2017, the Australian four won their heat, were surprised by a new combination USA crew in the semi and then in the final placed second to the USA and finished with world championship silver.

In 2019 Stephan was again picked in Australian women's sweep squad for the international season. In an effort to qualify the women's eight for the 2020 Olympics, selectors made some changes between the coxless four and the eight. Molly Goodman moved into the eight and Stephan was selected to stroke the Australian women's coxless four, leading them to a bronze medal at RWC II in Poznan and to a gold medal at WRC III in Rotterdam. Stephan, Aldersey, Werry and Hawe were selected to race Australia's coxless four at the 2019 World Rowing Championships in Linz, Austria. The four were looking for a top eight finish at the 2019 World Championships to qualify for the Tokyo Olympics. They won their heat and semi-final, thereby qualifying the boat for Tokyo 2020. They led the final from start to finish, took the gold medal and regained their world champion title.

By the time of national team selections in 2021 for the delayed Tokyo Olympics, Stephan was the sole member of the crew who had qualified the Australian coxless four on its 2019 performances. Stephan was selected in the bow seat of that boat with Rose Popa, Annabelle McIntyre and Jessica Morrison. This combination won the 2021 Australian national title in the women's coxless four. In Tokyo the four won their heat rowed two hours after Morrison and McIntyre's heat in the pair, and progressed straight to the A final. In the final with Stephan making the race calls from the bow, they led from the start, were challenged hard to the finish by the Dutch crew but took the gold in an Olympic best time.

Stephan was selected in the Australian women's sweep squad to prepare for the 2022 international season and the 2022 World Rowing Championships. She rowed in Australian women's coxless four at the World Rowing Cup II in Poznan to a gold medal victory. At the 2022 World Rowing Championships at Racize, she rowed in the Australian coxless four to a bronze medal.

In 2023 Stephan rejoined her two-time world champion crewmates of Katrina Werry and Sarah Hawe with new addition Giorgia Patten in the Australian women's coxless four for the 2023 international season. At the Rowing World Cup II in Varese, Italy they raced as Australia's W4- entrant. They made the A final and won a bronze medal. At 2023's RWC III in Lucerne, that unchanged four again raced the W4-. In the A final they led through to the 1800m mark but were overrun by Romania and finished with the silver medal. Their two medal wins at RWC II and III won them the 2023 RWC points score trophy for the W4-. That crew was selected intact as Australia's coxless four for the 2023 World Rowing Championships in Belgrade Serbia. They placed second in their heat. They placed 3rd in the A/B semi-final at which point they qualified an Australian W4- boat for the 2024 Paris Olympics. In the A final the four finished fifth, giving them a fifth place world ranking from the regatta.

== Accolades ==
In the 2022 Australia Day Honours Stephan was awarded the Medal of the Order of Australia.

== Personal life ==
Stephan completed a Bachelor of Arts at Deakin University.
