= Rowena Meredith =

Australian rower (born 1995)

Personal information
- Full name: Rowena Alice H. Meredith
- Born: 27 April 1995 (age 31) Basingstoke, England
- Years active: 2008–current
- Height: 181 cm (5 ft 11 in)

Sport
- Sport: Rowing
- Club: Mosman Rowing Club; Sydney University Boat Club

Achievements and titles
- National finals: Queen's Cup 2016–22
Medal record
Women's rowing
Representing Australia
Olympic Games
Bronze medal – third place	2020 Tokyo	Quad scull
U23 World Championships
Silver medal – second place	2017 Plovdiv	BW4X
Silver medal – second place	2015 Plovdiv	BW4X

Rowena Alice H. Meredith (born 27 April 1995) is an Australian representative rower. She is an Olympic medallist, a multiple Australian national champion at both U23 and senior levels, was twice a medallist at underage world championships and has won four medals at World Rowing Cups. She competed in the Australian women's quad scull at Tokyo 2021 winning a bronze medal.

== Club and state rowing ==
Born in Basingstoke England, Meredith was raised in Sydney, Australia and her senior club rowing was from the Mosman Rowing Club till 2016 and then Sydney University Boat Club from 2017.

Meredith's first state selection for New South Wales was in 2014 in women's youth eight contesting the Bicentennial Cup at the Interstate Regatta within the Australian Rowing Championships. She rowed again in the New South Wales youth eight in 2015. For seven straight years from 2016 to 2023 she was selected in the New South Wales senior women's eight competing for the Queen's Cup at the Interstate Regatta. Only the 2019 New South Wales eight was victorious.

Meredith raced in Mosman colours in a NSW composite eight contesting the women's eight event at the 2015 Australian Rowing Championships. That year she also contested the U23 women's quad scull title and placed second. At the 2016 Australian Rowing Championships she raced in Mosman colours for the U23 single, double and quad sculls titles. By 2017 Meredith was racing for SUBC and she won all three national U23 sculling titles – the single, double and quad.

At the 2018 Australian Championships Meredith contested the single and double sculls, and competed in a Sydney University eight for the women's eight title. In 2019 she placed second to Genevieve Horton in the Australian women's single scull championship and won the women's eight title in a composite selection crew. She won the national double scull title at the 2022 Australian Rowing Championships (racing with Harriet Hudson) and in 2023 rowing with Tara Rigney.

== International representative rowing ==
Meredith made her Australian representative debut at the 2015 World Rowing U23 Championships in Plovdiv where she rowed in the Australian quad scull to a silver medal. In 2016 she was again in the Australian U23 women's quad scull and she stroked that crew to a sixth-place finish at the 2016 World Rowing U23 Championships in Rotterdam.

In 2017 she was selected in the Australian senior quad scull with Leah Saunders, Genevieve Horton and Caitlin Cronin which won medals at two World Rowing Cups in Europe. With Harriet Hudson changed out for Saunders they were eligible to compete underage and raced to a silver medal at the World Rowing U23 Championships in Plovdiv, Bulgaria. Saunders came back into the crew for the 2017 World Rowing Championships in Sarasota, Florida. The young crew took on a tightly packed field in the final at Sarasota and were fourth at the halfway mark with Poland in the lead followed by The Netherlands. As the crews sprinted for the line, the Australian quad featuring three senior team debutantes other than Horton, dropped back and finished in sixth place.

Meredith and the quad stayed together into 2018 with Olympia Aldersey changed out for Saunders. At the 2018 World Rowing Cup II in Linz, they rowed to a bronze medal and then a sixth placing at the WRC III in Lucerne. At the 2018 World Rowing Championships in Plovdiv they finished in seventh place.

In 2019 Katrina Bateman returned to the Australian senior squad after a four-year absence and into the quad scull with Meredith, Fiona Ewing and Cara Grzeskowiak. They rowed to a fourth place at the World Rowing Cup II in Poznan and then to a bronze medal win at WRC III in Rotterdam. In that same crew Meredith was selected to race Australia's quad scull at the 2019 World Rowing Championships in Linz, Austria. The quad were looking for a top eight finish at the 2019 World Championships to qualify for the Tokyo Olympics. They placed fourth in the B-final for an overall tenth place finish and failed to qualify the boat for Tokyo 2020. Before those delayed Tokyo Olympics at the final Olympic qualification regatta in Lucerne, Switzerland in May 2021 in a crew with Caitlin Cronin, Harriet Hudson and Ria Thompson, she raced an Australian representative heavyweight quad, again attempting to qualify that boat. Victory in their heat and final saw them secure an Olympic berth. In Tokyo Meredith rowed the two seat of the Australian quad. They placed fourth in their heat and then won the repechage to make the A final. They were behind the lead for much of the race but winds had blown up before the event and some crews struggled with their bladework in the chop. The Australian quad kept their composure and excellent technique and managed a bronze medal finish on the line.

Meredith was selected in the Australian sculling squad to prepare for the 2022 international season and the 2022 World Rowing Championships. She raced at the World Rowing Cup II in Poznan in the Australian women's quad scull and at the WRC III in Lucerne, in the double. At the 2022 World Rowing Championships at Racize, she rowed in the Australian quad scull to an overall sixth place finish.

In March 2023 Meredith was again selected with Hudson, Thompson and Cronin as Australia's quad-scull for the 2023 international season. At the Rowing World Cup II in Varese, Italy they raced as Australia's W4X entrant. They made the B final and finished in overall eighth place. At 2023's RWC III in Lucerne, with Kathryn Rowan changed out for Ria Thompson, Meredith again raced in Australia's W4X. Again they finished 2nd in the B final for an overall eighth placing. At the 2023 World Rowing Championships in Belgrade Serbia, Meredith, Hudson, Cronin and Rowan were selected to race Australia's quad scull. They placed 3rd in their heat and then 3rd in the A/B semi-final at which point they qualified an Australian W4X boat for the 2024 Paris Olympics. In the A final the quad finished fifth, giving them a fifth place world ranking from the regatta.
