= Kathryn Rowan =

Australian rower (born 1996)

Kate Rowan
Personal information
- Full name: Kathryn Rowan
- Nationality: Australian
- Born: 16 December 1996 (age 28)
- Home town: Brisbane, Queensland, Australia
- Height: 180 cm (5 ft 11 in)

Sport
- Country: Australia
- Sport: Rowing
- Club: Sydney University Boat Club
- Coached by: John Keogh, Ellen Randell

Kathryn "Kate" Rowan (born 16 December 1996) is an Australian representative rower. She has represented at underage and senior World Championships.

== Club and state rowing ==
Rowan was raised in Queensland and attended St Peters Lutheran College in Brisbane. Her senior club rowing was initially from the University of Queensland Boat Club. She was selected into a New South Wales Institute of Sports program in 2021 and thereafter rowed with the Sydney University Boat Club.

Rowan first made state selection for Queensland in the 2018 women's senior eight which contested the Queen's Cup at the Interstate Regatta within the Australian Rowing Championships. She represented again in Queensland Queen's Cup eights in 2019 and 2021.

== International representative rowing ==
Rowan's Australian representative debut was in 2014 when she rowed in a coxless four at the World Junior Rowing Championships in Hamburg to a tenth placing. In 2018, she was selected in that Australian U23 women's eight which contested the U23 World Rowing Championships in Poznan where they made the A final and finished sixth. A few weeks earlier that crew had raced at the World Rowing Cup III.

By 2021, Rowan had switched over to sculling boats and she was Australia's sculling reserve at the delayed 2020 Tokyo Summer Olympics. She was selected in the Australian squad for the 2022 international season and the 2022 World Rowing Championships. She rowed in the Australian women's quad scull at World Rowing Cups II and III in Poznan and Lucerne. At the 2022 World Rowing Championships at Racize, she stroked the Australian women's quad. They made the A final and finished in sixth place.

In March 2023 Rowan was again selected in the Australian women's sculling squad for the 2023 international season. At 2023's RWC III in Lucerne, Rowan took the seat of Ria Thompson and raced with Rowena Meredith, Caitlin Cronin and Harriet Hudson in Australia's W4X. The boat repeated its result at RWCII three weeks earlier, finishing 2nd in the B final for an overall eighth placing. At the 2023 World Rowing Championships in Belgrade Serbia, Rowan, Hudson, Cronin and Meredith were selected to race Australia's quad scull. They placed third in their heat and then 3rd in the A/B semi-final at which point they qualified an Australian W4X boat for the 2024 Paris Olympics. In the A final the quad finished fifth, giving them a fifth place world ranking from the regatta.

Rowan was selected as a reserve for the Australian rowing team at the 2024 Summer Olympics.
