= Alexandra Hagan =

Australian rower (born 1991)

Personal information
- Nickname: Alex
- Nationality: Australian
- Born: 21 March 1991 (age 35) Bunbury, Western Australia
- Height: 179 cm (5 ft 10 in)
- Weight: 76 kg (168 lb)

Sport
- Country: Australia
- Sport: Rowing
- Club: Swan River Rowing Club

Achievements and titles
- Olympic finals: London 2012 W8+
Medal record
Women's rowing
Representing Australia
World Championships
| Bronze medal – third place | 2013 Chungju | Coxless four |
U23 World Championships
| Gold medal – first place | U23 2013 Linz | W4- |
| Bronze medal – third place | U23 2011 Amsterdam | W4- |

Alexandra Hagan (born 21 March 1991) is an Australian Olympic representative rower. She competed in the Australian women's eight at London 2012 and was again selected in the eight for Rio 2016. She competed and won bronze at World Rowing Championships in 2013.

== Personal ==
Hagan was born on 21 March 1991 in Bunbury, Western Australia. She grew up in the Perth area, attending Kearnan College Manjimup and St Joseph's Primary School, Bunbury before going to high school at Bunbury Catholic College. As of 2012, she lives in Bunbury, Western Australia. Hagan is 179 centimetres (70 in) tall and weighs 76 kilograms (168 lb).

== Club and state rowing ==
Hagan took up rowing at Bunbury Catholic College. She won the national Schoolgirl Scull title at the Australian Rowing Championships in 2007 and 2008.

Her senior club rowing is from Perth's Swan River Rowing Club and she has competed in Swan River colours at the national level in single scull, double sculls and eights races. At the 2008 Australian Rowing Championships, she placed first in the under-19 women's single scull event and repeated this victory in the same category in 2009. That year, she and Madeleine Edmunds also won the national under-19 women's double scull championship.

On nine consecutive occasions between 2008 and 2016 Hagan was seated in the Western Australian women's eight competing for the Queen's Cup in the Interstate Regatta within the Australian Rowing Championships.

== International rowing career ==
In 2009, Hagan competed at the World Junior Rowing Championships in Brive-la-Gaillarde France, in a quad scull, finishing second in the 2000 metres race. In 2011, she was part of the Australian team that finished third in at the U23 World Championship.

At the 2012 World Cup II in Lucerne, Switzerland Hagan was in the women's eight which finished 4th and then 5th in the same event at the World Cup III in Munich, Germany. In the women's eight over 2000m, she helped set a time of 6 minutes 12.36 seconds which qualified the crew for the London Olympics. She was selected to represent Australia at the 2012 Summer Olympics in the women's eight, who nicknamed themselves the "Motley Crew". Hagan was one of the youngest of Australia's forty-six member rowing team. Prior to London, she participated in a training camp at the Australian Institute of Sport European Training Centre in Varese, Italy. She was seated at six in the eight's Olympic campaign at 2012 London – the crew were disappointed with their 6th place finish.

In 2013 Hagan rowed in the senior women's eight who took gold at the World Rowing Cup I in Sydney. Half of World Cup eight were selected as a coxless four to compete at the 2013 World Rowing U23 Championships in Linz and in the lead up preparation they competed and won silver at the WRC III in Lucerne. At the 2013 U23 World Championships with Hannah Vermeersch and Charlotte Sutherland and stroked by Lucy Stephan, Vermeersch won gold and an U23 World Championship title. Two months later that same four raced as Australia's senior women's coxless four at the 2013 World Rowing Championships in Chungju, Korea and took a bronze medal. All members of the four also doubled-up in the senior women's eight with Hagan seated at six and they placed fifth in that event in Chungju.

Hagan was a member of the Australian eight who initially missed qualification for the 2016 Rio Olympics but received a late call up following the Russian drug scandal. WADA had discovered Russian state sponsored drug testing violations and the IOC acted to protect clean athletes and set strict entry guidelines for Russian athletes resulting in most of their rowers and nearly all of their crews being withdrawn from the Olympic regatta. The Australian women's VIII had dispersed two months earlier after their failure to qualify but reconvened, travelled at the last minute to Rio and borrowed a shell. They finished last in their heat, last in the repechage and were eliminated.
