= Harriet Hudson =

Australian rower (born 1998)

Personal information
- Born: 23 January 1998 (age 28) Toowoomba, Queensland, Australia
- Home town: Warwick, Queensland, Australia
- Years active: 2016–present
- Height: 184 cm (6 ft 0 in)

Sport
- Sport: Rowing
- Club: Sydney Rowing Club
- Coached by: Ellen Randell

Achievements and titles
- National finals: Queen's Cup 2017-19,22; Austn Champion 4X 2017; Austn Champion 4X 2021
Medal record
Women's rowing
Representing Australia
Olympic Games
Bronze medal – third place	2020 Tokyo	Quad scull
U23 World Championships
Silver medal – second place	2017 Plovdiv	BW4X
Silver medal – second place	2019 Sarasota-Bradenton	BW2X

Harriet Hudson (born 23 January 1998) is an Australian national representative rower. She is a three-time national senior champion, twice won silver medals at World U23 Championships and is an Olympian. She competed in the Australian women's quad scull at Tokyo 2021 winning a bronze medal.

== Club and state rowing ==
Raised in Warwick, Hudson attended boarding school at Somerville House in Brisbane where she took up rowing in Year 8, and represented the First VIII for 3 years in the Brisbane Schoolgirl’s Rowing Association (BSRA), before graduating in 2015. Her senior rowing has been from the Sydney Rowing Club.

Having relocated to Sydney for her tertiary studies, Hudson became eligible to represent New South Wales at the Interstate Regatta and she rowed in the NSW senior women's eight contesting the Queen's Cup in 2017, 2018 2019, 2022 and 2023. Only the 2019 crew was victorious. In 2022 she was also selected as NSW's single sculling entrant and raced to victory in the Nell Slatter Trophy at the 2022 Interstate Regatta.

In Sydney Rowing Club colours Hudson contested and won all three U19 Australian national titles in the sculling boat classes at the 2016 Australian Rowing Championships. In 2017 she placed 2nd in the double sculls and winning her first senior national title in a composite quad scull with her national training partners. In 2018 she again placed in both the double and the quad at the Australian championships. In 2019 she contested all three national sculling titles in the U23 age division in her campaign for selection for the U23 World Championships. She won the double-scull national title with Giorgia Patten.

In 2021 Hudson won her second Australian senior national title in a composite quad with her Australian representative teammates Meredith, Cronin and Thompson. At the Australian Rowing Championships in 2022 she won another national title – the women's eight – in a composite Australian selection crew.

== International representative rowing ==
Hudson made her Australian representative debut at the 2016 World Junior Rowing Championships in Rotterdam where she raced in the single scull to a sixth-place finish. In 2017 she was selected in the Australian U23 quad scull with Rowena Meredith, Caitlin Cronin and Genevieve Horton and raced to a silver medal at the World Rowing U23 Championships in Plovdiv, Bulgaria.

In 2018 Hudson and Ria Thompson raced at the World Rowing Cup III as a double-scull finishing 12th overall, two weeks later they rowed at the World U23 Rowing Championships in Poznan for a fifth-place finish. In 2019 Hudson teamed up with Patten and trained in Western Australia under coach Rhett Ayliffe. They were selected to row Australia's double-scull at the U23 World Championships in Sarasota-Bradenton where they won a silver medal behind Greece.

The Australian quad scull had raced in 2019 at World Cups and the World Championships but failed to qualify the boat for Tokyo. Before those delayed Tokyo Olympics at the final Olympic qualification regatta in Lucerne, Switzerland in May 2021 Hudson was selected with Meredith, Thompson and Caitlin Cronin to make a final attempt to qualify. Victories in their heat and final saw them secure an Olympic berth. In Tokyo Hudson rowed the three seat of the Australian quad. They placed fourth in their heat and then won the repechage to make the A final. They were behind the lead for much of the race but winds had blown up before the event and some crews struggled with their bladework in the chop. The Australian quad kept their composure and excellent technique and managed a bronze medal finish on the line.

Hudson was selected in the Australian sculling squad for the 2022 international season and the 2022 World Rowing Championships. She raced at the World Rowing Cup II in Poznan in the Australian women's quad scull to a fourth placing. At the 2022 World Rowing Championships at Racize, she rowed in the Australian quad scull to an overall sixth place finish.

In March 2023 Hudson was again selected with Cronin, Thompson and Meredith as Australia's quad-scull for the 2023 international season. At the Rowing World Cup II in Varese, Italy they raced as Australia's W4X entrant. They made the B final and finished in overall eighth place. At 2023's RWC III in Lucerne, with Kathryn Rowan changed out for Ria Thompson, Hudson again raced in Australia's W4X. Again they finished 2nd in the B final for an overall eighth placing. At the 2023 World Rowing Championships in Belgrade Serbia, Hudson, Cronin, Rowan and Meredith were selected to race Australia's quad scull. They placed third in their heat and then 3rd in the A/B semi-final at which point they qualified an Australian W4X boat for the 2024 Paris Olympics. In the A final the quad finished fifth, giving them a fifth place world ranking from the regatta.
