= Giorgia Patten =

Australian rower

Personal information
- Nationality: Australian
- Born: 12 December 1998 (age 27)
- Years active: 2017–

Sport
- Country: Australia
- Sport: Rowing
- Events: Coxless pair, Eight
- Club: West Australian Rowing Club

Achievements and titles
- Olympic finals: Tokyo 2020 W8+
- National finals: Queen's Cup (W8+) 2019–22; Australian Championship W8+ 2021
Medal record
Women's rowing
Representing Australia
World Championships
Silver medal – second place	2026 Amsterdam	Coxless four
U23 World Championships
Silver medal – second place	2019 Sarasota-Bradenton	BW2X

Giorgia Patten (born 12 December 1999) is an Australian representative, Olympic and national champion rower. She is a national U23 and senior champion and has placed second at World U23 Championships. She rowed in the Australian women's eight at the Tokyo 2020 Olympics and the Paris 2024 Olympics.

== Club and state rowing ==
Patten is a West Australian who took up rowing at school at Perth College. Her senior club rowing has been from the West Australian Rowing Club.

Her state representative debut for Western Australia came in the 2017 youth eight which contested the Bicentennial Cup at the Interstate Regatta within the Australian Rowing Championships. She again rowed in the West Australian youth eight in 2018. She made Western Australia's senior women's eight in 2019 and contested the Queen's Cup at the Interstate Regatta for WA in 2019, 2021, 2022 and 2023. In 2021 she stroked the West Australian women's eight.

In 2019 she contested all three national sculling titles in the U23 age division in her campaign for selection for the U23 World Championships. She won the double-scull U23 national title with Harriet Hudson. In 2021 in a National Training Centre eight she won the open women's eight title at the Australian Championships. That year she also contested the open women's pair and the women's coxless four titles.

== International representative rowing ==
Patten made her Australian representative debut in the coxless pair with fellow West Australian Bronwyn Cox in 2018. They rowed to a sixth placing at the World Rowing Cup III in Lucerne and then took the pair to the 2018 World Rowing U23 Championships in Poznan and finished in fifth place.

In 2019 Patten teamed up with Harriet Hudson and Hudson came to Perth where they trained under Western Australian coach Rhett Ayliffe. They were selected to row Australia's double-scull at the U23 World Championships in Sarasota-Bradenton where they won a silver medal behind Greece.

By the time of national team selections for the delayed Tokyo Olympics, Patten had forced her way into the Australian women's eight, which had qualified for the Olympics on its 2019 international performances.

At the Tokyo 2020 Olympics the Australian women's eight were placed third in their heat, fourth in the repechage and fifth in the Olympic A final. Had they managed to maintain their time of 5:57:15 that they achieved in their repechage they would have beaten the winners, Canada, by nearly two seconds and won the gold medal.

Patten was selected in the Australian women's sweep squad to prepare for the 2022 international season and the 2022 World Rowing Championships. She rowed in the six seat of the Australian women's eight at the World Rowing Cup II in Poznan to a third placing and at the WRC III in Lucerne to a gold medal. At the 2022 World Rowing Championships at Racize, Patten was in the six seat of the Australian women's eight. They made the A final and finished in fifth place.

In 2023 Patten was selected to join the two-time world champion trio of Sarah Hawe, Katrina Werry and Lucy Stephan in the Australian women's coxless four for the 2023 international season. At the Rowing World Cup II in Varese, Italy they raced as Australia's W4- entrant. They made the A final and won a bronze medal. At 2023's RWC III in Lucerne, that unchanged four again raced the W4-. In the A final they led through to the 1800m mark but were overrun by Romania and finished with the silver medal. Their two medal wins at RWC II and III won them the 2023 RWC points score trophy for the W4-. That crew was selected intact as Australia's coxless four for the 2023 World Rowing Championships in Belgrade Serbia. They placed second in their heat. They placed 3rd in the A/B semi-final at which point they qualified an Australian W4- boat for the 2024 Paris Olympics. In the A final the four finished fifth, giving them a fifth place world ranking from the regatta.

Giorgia was selected to the Australia Women's Eight for the 2024 Paris Olympic Games. The crew placed second in their Heat in the third fastest qualifying time (6:18.61) but booked a spot in the repechage two days later. They were third in the Rep, with the USA and Canada getting their bows in front but beating Italy and Denmark to secure their A Final spot. In the A Final, eventual winners Romania dominated the race and the Australian crew finished fourth - the best result for an Australian Women's Eight in Olympic history, and just 1.2 seconds back from Bronze medalists, Great Britain.
