= Ria Thompson =

Australian rower (born 1997)

Personal information
- Born: 3 November 1997 (age 28) Carlton, Victoria, Australia
- Home town: Point Lonsdale, Victoria, Australia
- Years active: 2016–present
- Height: 173 cm (5 ft 8 in)

Sport
- Sport: Rowing
- Event(s): Women's quad sculls (W4x); Women's single sculls (W1x)
- Club: Melbourne Rowing Club; Mercantile Rowing Club; University of Queensland Boat Club
- Coached by: Tom Westgarth

Achievements and titles
- National finals: Nell Slatter Trophy 2018,2021; Queen's Cup 2019,22; Australian Champion 4X 2017
Medal record
Women's rowing
Representing Australia
Olympic Games
Bronze medal – third place	2020 Tokyo	Quad scull
U23 World Championships
Gold medal – first place	2019 Sarasota-Bradenton	BW1X

Ria Thompson (born 3 November 1997) is an Australian national representative rower. She is a national senior and underage champion, won a world title at the 2019 World U23 Championships and is an Olympian. She competed in the Australian women's quad scull at Tokyo 2021 and won a bronze medal.

== Club and state rowing ==
Raised in Melbourne Thompson attended Lowther Hall Anglican Grammar School where she took up rowing. Her senior rowing has been from a number of clubs - Melbourne Rowing Club, Mercantile Rowing Club and the University of Queensland Boat Club.

Thompson began contesting underage national titles at the Australian Rowing Championships in Melbourne Rowing Club colours from 2016. She won the 2016 U21 Australian championship in the single scull. In 2017 she rowed to second placings in U23 national championships in the double and quad sculls. In 2018 in Mercantile colours she won all U23 national titles in all three sculling boat classes. In 2019 now racing for UQBC she won U23 national titles in the single scull and as stroke of the quad scull. She placed second in the U23 double scull.

In 2021 Thompson won her first Australian senior national title in a composite quad with her Australian representative teammates Rowena Meredith, Caitlin Cronin and Harriet Hudson. She also contested the single and the placed third in the double scull in the open age category.

Thompson made her first state representative appearance at stroke in the Victorian women's youth eight which contested and won the Bicentennial Cup at the 2017 Interstate Regatta. In 2018 and again in 2021 she was the Victorian selected single sculler to contest the Nell Slatter Trophy at the Interstate Regatta. In 2019 she rowed in the two seat in the Victorian Queen's Cup eight which placed second to NSW. She rowed again in Victorian women's senior eights to Queen's Cup victories in 2022

== International representative rowing ==
In 2018 Thompson made her Australian representative debut racing with Harriet Hudson at the World Rowing Cup III as a double-scull and finishing 12th overall, two weeks later they rowed at the World U23 Rowing Championships in Poznan for a fifth place finish.

In 2019 Thompson was selected as Australia's women's sculling representative for the World U23 Championships in Sarasota-Bradenton where she raced to a gold medal and an U23 world championship title. Thompson sat in fourth place for the first 1250m of the race before rowing past the leaders and catching the American sculler Emily Kallfelz in the last 40m.

An Australian quad scull had raced in 2019 at World Cups and the World Championships but failed to qualify the boat for Tokyo. Before those delayed Tokyo Olympics at the final Olympic qualification regatta in Lucerne, Switzerland in May 2021 Thompson was selected with Meredith, Hudson and Cronin to make a final attempt to qualify. Victory in their heat and final saw them secure an Olympic berth. In Tokyo Ria rowed the bow seat of the Australian quad. They placed fourth in their heat and then won the repechage to make the A final. They were behind the lead for much of the race but winds had blown up before the event and some crews struggled with their bladework in the chop. The Australian quad kept their composure and excellent technique and managed a bronze medal finish on the line.

In March 2023 Thompson was again selected with Hudson, Cronin and Meredith as Australia's quad-scull for the 2023 international season. At the Rowing World Cup II in Varese, Italy they raced as Australia's W4X entrant. They made the B final and finished in overall eighth place.
