= Sarah Hawe =

Australian rower (born 1987)

Personal information
- Nationality: Australian
- Born: 23 July 1987 (age 39) Bentleigh East, Victoria, Australia
- Height: 1.88 m (6 ft 2 in)
- Weight: 74 kg (163 lb)

Sport
- Country: Australia
- Sport: Rowing
- Event: Coxless four
- Club: Huon Rowing Club

Achievements and titles
- Olympic finals: Tokyo 2020 W8+
- National finals: Queen's Cup 2014, 15, 18
Medal record
Women's rowing
Representing Australia
World Championships
Gold medal – first place	2017 Sarasota	Coxless four
Gold medal – first place	2019 Ottensheim	Coxless four
Silver medal – second place	2018 Plovdiv	Coxless four

Sarah Hawe (born 23 July 1987) is an Australian rower. She is an Australian national champion, an Olympian and a two-time world champion winning the 2019 and 2017 world titles in the coxless four. She was a winner of the Remenham Challenge Cup at the 2018 Henley Royal Regatta in the Australian women's eight. She rowed in the Australian women's eight at the Tokyo 2020 Olympics.

== Club and state rowing ==
Born in Victoria, Hawe's initial senior rowing was from the Huon Rowing Club in Tasmania. She won a scholarship to the Tasmanian Institute of Sport.

She has contested national titles at the Australian Rowing Championships in Huon Rowing Club colours on number of occasions and in 2017 won titles in all three sweep-oared women's boat classes. She won the women's coxless pair with Meaghan Volker, the coxless four title in a Tasmanian composite crew and the women's eight title. In 2018 she won the women's coxless pair national title with Molly Goodman. In 2021 in a National Training Centre eight she won the women's eight title at the Australian Championships. At the Australian Rowing Championships in 2022 she again won the women's eight national title in a composite Australian selection crew.

In 2014 and 2015 Hawe was selected in the Tasmanian senior women's eights contesting the Queen's Cup at the Interstate Regatta within the Australian Rowing Championships. Eligible in 2018 to race for Victoria she was selected in the Victorian senior women's eight who won that year's Queen's Cup at the Interstate Regatta. In 2021 and 2023 she was again in the Victorian women's eight for Queen's Cup victories. Sarah is also a member of the Tasmanian Institute of Sport.

== International representative rowing ==
Hawe first represented Australia in a double scull at the 2005 Junior World Rowing Championships in Brandenburg. That crew placed fifth.

Hawe was not called back into national selection until 2017 when she was chosen in Australia's coxless four with Lucy Stephan, Molly Goodman, and Katrina Werry. They competed at the World Rowing Cups II and III and as a foursome they didn't lose a race in the international season. At the 2017 World Rowing Championships in Sarasota, Florida it was to be no different. They won their heat and started slow in the final sitting in sixth place at the 500m and fifth place at the 1000m mark. In third 500m they began to push on the Dutch and were joined by Poland and Russia all challenging for the podium. In the final sprint, Stephan called Goodman to up the rating and at 43 strokes per minute the Australian four surged into the lead to claim gold and the world championships title ahead of Poland and Russia.

With Katrina Werry changed out for Rosemary Popa the world champion four stayed together into 2018 and started their 2018 international campaign with a gold medal win at the World Rowing Cup II in Linz, Austria. In their second competitive outing of the 2018 international season in an Australian selection eight and racing as the Georgina Hope Rinehart National Training Centre, after Rowing Australia patron, Gina Rinehart, Hawe won the 2018 Remenham Challenge Cup at the Henley Royal Regatta. The following week back in the coxless four, Hawe won another gold at the World Rowing Cup III in Lucerne. By the time of 2018 World Rowing Championships Popa was out of the four with an injury and Kat Werry back in. Seated as they had been in 2017, the Australian four won their heat, were surprised by a new combination USA crew in the semi and then in the final placed second to the US and finished with world championship silver.

In 2019 Hawe was again picked in Australian women's sweep squad for the international season. For the two Rowing World Cups in Europe, Hawe was seated at three in the Australian coxless four and rowed to a bronze medal at RWC II in Poznan and to a gold medal at WRC III in Rotterdam. Hawe, Aldersey, Werry and Stephan were selected to race Australia's coxless four at the 2019 World Rowing Championships in Linz, Austria. The four were looking for a top eight finish at the 2019 World Championships to qualify for the Tokyo Olympics. They won their heat and semi-final, thereby qualifying the boat for Tokyo 2020. They led the final from start to finish, took the gold medal and regained their world champion title.

At the Tokyo 2020 Olympics the strong Australian pair of Jessica Morrison and Annabelle McIntyre were asked to double up in the pair and the four. Sarah Hawe moved into the Australian women's eight who placed third in their heat, fourth in the repechage and fifth in the Olympic A final. Had they managed to maintain their time of 5:57:15 that they achieved in their repechage they would have beaten the winners, Canada, by nearly two seconds and won the gold medal.In Tokyo the Australian women's eight placed third in their heat, fourth in the repechage and fifth in the Olympic A final.

In 2023 Hawe rejoined her two-time world champion crewmates of Katrina Werry and Lucy Stephan with new addition Giorgia Patten in the Australian women's coxless four for the 2023 international season. At the Rowing World Cup II in Varese, Italy they raced as Australia's W4- entrant. They made the A final and won a bronze medal. At 2023's RWC III in Lucerne, that unchanged four again raced the W4-. In the A final they led through to the 1800m mark but were overrun by Romania and finished with the silver medal. Their two medal wins at RWC II and III won them the 2023 RWC points score trophy for the W4-. That crew was selected intact as Australia's coxless four for the 2023 World Rowing Championships in Belgrade Serbia. They placed second in their heat. They placed 3rd in the A/B semi-final at which point they qualified an Australian W4- boat for the 2024 Paris Olympics. In the A final the four finished fifth, giving them a fifth place world ranking from the regatta.
