= Hannah Vermeersch =

Australian rower

Personal information
- Nickname: Verm
- Nationality: Australian
- Born: 10 September 1992 (age 34) Esperance
- Height: 178 cm (70 in)
- Weight: 68 kg (150 lb)

Sport
- Country: Australia
- Sport: Rowing

Achievements and titles
- Olympic finals: London 2012 W8+
Medal record
Women's rowing
Representing Australia
World Championships
Bronze medal – third place	2013 Chungju	W4−
U23 World Championships
Gold medal – first place	U23 2013 Linz	W4-

Hannah Vermeersch (born 10 September 1992) is an Australian Olympic rower. She represented for Australia at the 2012 Summer Olympics and at World Championships from 2013 to 2018. She won the Remenham Challenge Cup at the 2018 Henley Royal Regatta in the Australian women's eight.

== Personal ==
Vermeersch was born in Esperance, Western Australia and attended Scaddan Primary School and Presbyterian Ladies' College, Perth. She started a Bachelor of Sports Science at Murdoch University in 2010. As of 2012, she lived in Perth, Western Australia.

== Club and state rowing ==
Vermeersch competes in sweep-oared boats. She was coached by Rebecca Sattin and won a rowing scholarship from the Western Australian Institute of Sport. Her senior club rowing has been from the West Australian Rowing Club.

Vermeersch was first selected to represent Western Australia in the women's youth eight in 2010 contesting the Bicentennial Cup at the Interstate Regatta within the Australian Rowing Championships. From 2011 to 2015 and then in 2017 and 2018 she rowed in Western Australia's senior women's eights contesting the Queen's Cup at the Interstate Regatta.

In West Australian Rowing Club colours she contested national titles at the Australian Rowing Championships on a number of occasions. In 2012 in West Lakes, she raced for the coxless pair championship with Alexandra Hagan and finished second. The 2013 she raced in that same event with Lucy Stephan and finished sixth and in 2014 with Sophie Sutherland placing seventh. She contested the coxless four title in an Australian selection composite in 2014 and was beaten out for the gold by a visiting Californian crew.

== International representative rowing ==
Vermeersch first represented at the Junior World Rowing Championships in 2009 at Brive-La-Gaillarde where she won a gold medal in the Australian women's coxless four. The following year at the 2010 Junior World Championships in Racice, she rowed again in the coxless four and won a bronze medal.

Vermeersch made her senior Australian representative debut in 2012. She was selected in the Australian senior women's eight who finished fourth at the 2012 World Cup II in Lucerne, Switzerland and placed fifth in the same event at the 2012 World Cup III in Munich, Germany. In that eight over a 2000m course, she helped set a time of 6 minutes 12.36 seconds, which qualified that Australian boat for the Olympics.

Vermeersch was selected to represent Australia at the 2012 Summer Olympics in rowing in the eights. The crew nicknamed themselves the "Motley Crew". She earned selection on the boat after a battle between ten women for eight spots. With an Australian rowing team of forty-six rowers, she was one of the youngest members of the team. Prior to going to London, she participated in a training camp at the Australian Institute of Sport European Training Centre in Varese, Italy. Vermeersch was seated at bow in the eight's Olympic campaign at 2012 London – the crew were disappointed with their 6th place finish.

In 2013 she rowed in the senior women's eight who took gold at the World Rowing Cup I in Sydney. Half of World Cup eight were selected as a coxless four to compete at the 2013 World Rowing U23 Championships in Linz and in the lead up preparation they competed and won silver at the WRC III in Lucerne. At the 2013 U23 World Championships with Alexandra Hagan and Charlotte Sutherland and stroked by Lucy Stephan, Vermeersch won gold and an U23 World Championship title. Two months later that same four raced as Australia's senior women's coxless four at the 2013 World Rowing Championships in Chungju, Korea and took a bronze medal. All members of the four also doubled-up in the senior women's eight with Vermeersch seated at bow and they placed fifth in that event in Chungju.

Vermeersch held her seat in the Australian senior eight for the next two years. She raced at the 2014 World Rowing Cup III in Lucerne and then in the bow seat in the eight's campaign at the 2014 World Rowing Championships in Amsterdam where they finished in tenth place. In 2015 she was in the eight at two World Rowing Cups in Europe and also competed in a coxless four at the WRC II. Then in her final Australian representative appearance, Vermeersch rowed in the two seat of the eight at the 2015 World Rowing Championships in Aiguebelette. They finished in overall seventh place.

In 2018 Vermeersch was back in representative contention and regained a seat in the Australian women's eight. The eight started their 2018 international campaign with a bronze medal win at the World Rowing Cup II in Linz, Austria. In their second competitive outing of the 2018 international season in an Australian selection eight and racing as the Georgina Hope Rinehart National Training Centre, after Rowing Australia patron, Gina Rinehart, Vermeersch won the 2018 Remenham Challenge Cup at the Henley Royal Regatta. At the 2018 World Rowing Championships in Plovdiv she raced the Australian coxless pair with Addy Dunkley-Smith. They finished second in the B final for an overall eight place finish.
