= Molly Goodman =

Australian rower (born 1993)

Personal information
- Born: 19 February 1993 (age 33) Rose Park, Australia
- Height: 1.83 m (6 ft 0 in)
- Weight: 80 kg (176 lb)
- Relative: Tom Goodman (brother)

Sport
- Country: Australia
- Sport: Rowing
- Events: Coxless four, Eight

Achievements and titles
- Olympic finals: Tokyo 2020 W8+
- National finals: Queen's Cup 2013–16,19,21
Medal record
Women's rowing
Representing Australia
World Championships
| Gold medal – first place | 2017 Sarasota | Coxless four |
| Silver medal – second place | 2018 Plovdiv | Coxless four |
| Silver medal – second place | 2019 Ottensheim | Eight |
| Bronze medal – third place | 2023 Belgrade | Eight |

Molly Goodman (born 19 February 1993) is an Australian rower. She is a national champion, a three-time Olympian and a world champion winning the 2017 world title in a coxless four. She stroked the Australian eight to victory in the Remenham Challenge Cup at the 2018 Henley Royal Regatta. She stroked the Australian women's eight at the Tokyo 2020 Olympics.

== Club and state rowing ==
Raised in Adelaide, Goodman rows from the Adelaide Rowing Club.

Goodman was first selected to represent South Australia in the women's youth eight in 2011 contesting the Bicentennial Cup at the Interstate Regatta within the Australian Rowing Championships. From 2013 to 2016 she stroked the South Australian senior women's eight competing for the Queen's Cup at the Interstate Regatta. In 2019 and 2021 she again stroked the South Australian women's Queen's Cup eight. In 2023 she was the South Australian entrant to contest the interstate single scull title and placed third.

In Adelaide Rowing Club colours she has contested national championship title at the Australian Rowing Championships on various occasions. At the 2017 Australian Championships she contested the national titles for a coxless pair, coxless four and the women's eight. She won the open women's coxless pair national title with Sarah Hawe in 2018. In 2018 she crewed a composite Australian selection eight who won the open women's eight title at the Australian Rowing Championships and she repeated that feat and again won that title in a National Training Centre eight in 2021. At the 2023 Australian Rowing Championships she won the open quad scull national title in a composite crew.

== International representative rowing ==
Goodman's national representative debut came in 2011 when she was selected to contest the 2011 Junior World Rowing Championships at Eton Dorney in Australia's quad scull. That quad placed tenth overall. In 2013 she competed at the World Rowing U23 Championships in Linz rowing the four seat of the women's eight to a fourth placing in the final.

She was elevated to the Australian women's senior eight in 2014. They raced at the World Rowing Cup III in Lucerne and then at the 2014 World Rowing Championships in Amsterdam finishing in tenth place. In 2015 she represented in a coxless pair with Genevieve Horton. They competed at two World Rowing Cups in Europe before contesting the 2015 World Rowing Championships in Aiguebelette and coming away with a world thirteenth ranking.

Goodman was a member of the Australian women's eight who initially missed qualification for the 2016 Rio Olympics but received a late call up following the Russian drug scandal. WADA had discovered Russian state sponsored drug testing violations and the IOC acted to protect clean athletes and set strict entry guidelines for Russian athletes resulting in most of their rowers and nearly all of their crews being withdrawn from the Olympic regatta. The crew had dispersed two months earlier after their failure to qualify but reconvened, travelled at the last minute to Rio and borrowed a shell. They finished last in their heat, last in the repechage and were eliminated.

After the Olympics Goodman continued to compete at the highest level and in 2017 she was selected at stroke in Australia's coxless four with Lucy Stephan, Katrina Werry, and Sarah Hawe. They competed at the World Rowing Cups II and III and as a foursome they didn't lose a race in the international season. At the 2017 World Rowing Championships in Sarasota, Florida it was to be no different. They won their heat and started slow in the final sitting in sixth place at the 500m and fifth place at the 1000m mark. In third 500m they began to push on the Dutch and were joined by Poland and Russia all challenging for the podium. In the final sprint, Stephan called Goodman to up the rating and at 43 strokes per minute the Australian four surged into the lead to claim gold and the world championships title ahead of Poland and Russia.

With Katrina Werry changed out for Rosemary Popa the world champion four stayed together into 2018 and started their 2018 international campaign with a gold medal win at the World Rowing Cup II in Linz, Austria. In their second competitive outing of the 2018 international season in an Australian selection eight and racing as the Georgina Hope Rinehart National Training Centre, after Rowing Australia patron, Gina Rinehart, Goodman stroked the crew to victory in the 2018 Remenham Challenge Cup at the Henley Royal Regatta. The following week back in the coxless four, Goodman won another gold at the World Rowing Cup III in Lucerne. By the time of 2018 World Rowing Championships Popa was out of the four with an injury and Kat Werry back in. Seated as they had been in 2017, the Australian four won their heat, were surprised by new combination USA crew in the semi and then in the final placed second to the USA and finished with world championship silver.

In 2019 Goodman was again picked in Australian women's sweep squad for the international season. In an effort to qualify the women's eight for the 2020 Olympics, selectors made some changes between the coxless four and the eight. Goodman was selected to stroke the Australian women's eight and led them to a gold medal win at Rowing World Cup II in Poznan and to a silver medal at WRC III in Rotterdam. Goodman was then selected to race in Australia's women's eight at the 2019 World Rowing Championships in Linz, Austria. The eight were looking for a top five finish at the 2019 World Championships to qualify for the Tokyo Olympics. They placed second in their heat, came through the repechage and led in the final from the start and at all three 500m marks till they were overrun by New Zealand by 2.7secs. The Australian eight took the silver medal and qualified for Tokyo 2020.

At the Tokyo 2020 Olympics, the Australian women's eight were placed third in their heat, fourth in the repechage and fifth in the Olympic A final. Had they managed to maintain their time of 5:57:15 that they achieved in their repechage they would have beaten the winners, Canada, by nearly two seconds and won the gold medal.

In March 2023 Goodman was again selected in the Australian senior women's sweep-oar squad for the 2023 international season. At the Rowing World Cup II in Varese Italy, Goodman raced in the Australian women's eight. They led from the start in the A final and won the gold medal. At 2023's RWC III in Lucerne, the eight was unchanged. In the final they led through to the 1500m mark but finished in third place for the bronze medal. For the 2023 World Rowing Championships in Belgrade Serbia, the Australian women's eight was unchanged aside from some seat shifts in the bow end and Goodman again raced in the seven seat. They finished 2nd in their heat and then needed to proceed through a repechage which they won. In the A final they led through the first 1000m on a low rating of 37/38 but were rowed through by the high-rating Romanians and a fast finishing USA eight. The Australians won the bronze medal, a 3rd place world ranking and Paris 2024 qualification.
