= Caragh McMurtry =

British rower

Personal information
- Born: 22 August 1991 (age 34) Southampton, England
- Height: 174 cm (5 ft 9 in)

Sport
- Sport: Rowing
- Club: Southampton Coalporters ARC

Caragh McMurtry (born 22 August 1991) is a British retired rower. She competed for Great Britain at the 2020 Summer Olympics in Tokyo.

== Early life and education ==
McMurtry was born in Southampton, where she attended Bitterne Park School and Itchen College. She was introduced to rowing through British Rowing's Project Oarsome scheme and joined Coalporters Rowing Club. She later attended Reading University.

== Rowing career ==
McMurtry made her international debut in 2009 at junior level in the Munich International Regatta, where she won silver in the coxless pair and gold in the coxless four. She then won silver in the four at the World Rowing Junior Championships in Brive-la-Gaillarde.

In 2012, with Olivia Carnegie-Brown, she won silver in pairs at the World Rowing U23 Championships in Trakai and the European Rowing Championships in Varese, and also rowed in the eight that won bronze at the European Championships.

She made her senior debut in the eight at the 2013 World Rowing Championships in Chungju, rowing to a silver medal at the 2014 European Championships in Belgrade, bronze in the second and third stages of that year's World Rowing Cup at Aiguebelette-le-Lac and Lucerne, and rowed stroke at the 2014 World Rowing Championships in Amsterdam. She was then forced to withdraw from competition due to illness, missing the 2016 Olympics in Rio.

In the 2017 World Rowing Cup, McMurtry rowed in the women's eight that took silver in the second stage at Poznań, then with Samantha Courty won the B final in pairs in the second stage at Lucerne. In the 2017 World Rowing Championships at Sarasota and again in the 2018 World Rowing Championships at Plovdiv, her four won the B final.

In June 2021 she was selected for the Great Britain rowing team at the 2020 Summer Olympics in Tokyo, which were delayed a year by the COVID-19 pandemic. She competed in the women's eight; Great Britain were eliminated in the repechage. She subsequently retired from competitive rowing.

== Personal life ==
McMurtry is married to professional cyclist Mikey Mottram. She was diagnosed with autism as an adult following a misdiagnosis of bipolar disorder that led to five years of drug treatments, and in 2022 she and her husband founded Neurodiverse Sport, to support other neurodiverse athletes and promote neuroinclusion within sport. In December 2023 she won an innovation award at the UK Sport PLx Awards for her work for neuroinclusion. She has created artworks on commission.
