= Katrina Werry =

Australian rower (born 1993)

Personal information
- Nationality: Australian
- Born: 10 October 1993 (age 33)

Sport
- Country: Australia
- Sport: Rowing
- Events: Coxless pair, Coxless four

Achievements and titles
- Olympic finals: Tokyo 2020 W8+
- National finals: Queen's Cup 2015, 17-18, 21-22
Medal record
Women's rowing
Representing Australia
World Championships
Gold medal – first place	2017 Sarasota	Coxless four
Gold medal – first place	2019 Ottensheim	Coxless four
Silver medal – second place	2018 Plovdiv	Coxless four
Bronze medal – third place	2022 Račice	Coxless four
World Championships (U23)
Bronze medal – third place	2015 Plovdiv	Coxless pair

Katrina Werry (born 10 October 1993) is an Olympian and Australian national and two-time world champion rower. At the 2017 World Rowing Championships, she became world champion in the women's coxless four with Lucy Stephan, Sarah Hawe, and Molly Goodman. She regained that coxless four world championship title in 2019. She won the Remenham Challenge Cup at the 2018 Henley Royal Regatta in the Australian women's eight. She rowed in the Australian women's eight at the Tokyo 2020 Olympics.

== Club and state rowing ==
Werry's senior rowing was raised in Victoria from the Mercantile Rowing Club. She won a scholarship to the Victorian Institute of Sport.

Werry was first selected to represent Victoria in the women's youth eight in the 2012 contesting the Bicentennial Cup at the Interstate Regatta within the Australian Rowing Championships. She raced again in 2013 in the Victorian youth eight. In 2015, 2017, 2018, 2019, 2021, 2022 and 2023, she was selected in Victoria's senior women's eight competing for the Queen's Cup at the Interstate Regatta. Those crews containing Werry were victorious in every year except 2019.

In Mercantile colours, she contested championship titles at the Australian Rowing Championships on numerous occasions. She raced in an all-Mercantile coxless pair and eight in the 2017 Australian Championships, finishing second in both. She also contested the coxless pair title in 2018, finishing fourth. In 2021, in the National Training Centre eight, she won the open women's eight title at the Australian Championships. With Lucy Stephan, she won the open women's national coxless pair titles at the 2022 and 2023 Australian Rowing Championships.

== International representative rowing ==
Werry made her Australian representative debut in the women's eight competing at the 2014 World Rowing U23 Championships in Varese. They raced in fourth place. At the 2015 U23 World Championships in Plovdiv the following year, she raced a coxless pair with her Mercantile club-mate Addy Dunkly-Smith. They won the bronze medal.

In 2017, Werry was elevated to the Australian senior squad and was selected in the coxless four with Lucy Stephan, Molly Goodman, and Sarah Hawe. They competed at the World Rowing Cups II and III, and as a foursome, they didn't lose a race in the international season. It was to be no different at the 2017 World Rowing Championships in Sarasota, Florida. They won their heat and started slow in the final, sitting in sixth place at the 500m and fifth place at the 1000m mark. In the third 500m, they began to push on the Dutch and were joined by Poland and Russia, all challenging for the podium. In the final sprint, Stephan called Goodman to up the rating, and at 43 strokes per minute, the Australian four surged into the lead to claim gold and the world championships title ahead of Poland and Russia.

Werry was selected in the Australian women's sweep squad in 2018 but was initially seated in the eight and replaced in the coxless four by Rosie Popa. In their second competitive outing of the 2018 international season in an Australian selection eight and racing as the Georgina Hope Rinehart National Training Centre, after Rowing Australia patron, Gina Rinehart, Werry won the 2018 Remenham Challenge Cup at the Henley Royal Regatta. Without Werry, the four won gold at two WRCs in Europe, but by the time of the 2018 World Rowing Championships, Popa was out of the four with an injury and Werry back in the two seat. Seated as they had been in 2017, the Australian fours won their heat. They were surprised by a new combination USA crew in the semi, and then, in the final, placed second to the USA and finished with the world championship silver.

In 2019, Werry was again picked in the Australian women's sweep squad for the international season. Werry was seated at two in the Australian coxless four for the two Rowing World Cups in Europe and rowed to a bronze medal at RWC II in Poznan and to a gold medal at WRC III in Rotterdam. Werry, Olympia Aldersey, Hawe and Stephan were selected to race Australia's coxless four at the 2019 World Rowing Championships in Linz, Austria. The four sought a top-eight finish at the 2019 World Championships to qualify for the Tokyo Olympics. They won their heat and semi-final, qualifying the boat for Tokyo 2020. They led the final from start to finish, took the gold medal and regained their world champion title.

At the Tokyo 2020 Olympics, the strong Australian pair of Jessica Morrison and Annabelle McIntyre were asked to double up in the pair and the four. Kat Werry moved into the seven seats of the Australian women's eight, who placed third in their heat, fourth in the repechage and fifth in the Olympic A final. At the Tokyo 2020 Olympics, the Australian women's eight were placed third in their heat, fourth in the repechage and fifth in the Olympic A final. Had they managed to maintain the time of 5:57:15 that they achieved in their repechage, they would have beaten the winners, Canada, by nearly two seconds and won the gold medal.

Werry was selected in the Australian women's sweep squad to prepare for the 2022 international season and the 2022 World Rowing Championships. She rowed in the Australian women's coxless four at Poznan's World Rowing Cup II to a gold medal victory. At the 2022 World Rowing Championships at Racize, she rowed in the Australian coxless four to a bronze medal.

In 2023, Werry rejoined her two-time world champion crewmates of Sarah Hawe and Lucy Stephan with new addition Giorgia Patten in the Australian women's coxless four for the 2023 international season. At the Rowing World Cup II in Varese, Italy, they raced as Australia's W4- entrant. They made the A final and won a bronze medal. At 2023's RWC III in Lucerne, that unchanged four again raced the W4-. In the A final, they led through to the 1800m mark but were overrun by Romania and finished with the silver medal. Their two medal wins at RWC II and III won them the 2023 RWC points score trophy for the W4-. That crew was selected intact as Australia's coxless four for the 2023 World Rowing Championships in Belgrade, Serbia. They placed second in their heat. They placed 3rd in the A/B semi-final, at which point they qualified an Australian W4- boat for the 2024 Paris Olympics. In the A final, the four finished fifth, giving them a fifth-place world ranking from the regatta.
