= Genevieve Horton =

Australian rower

Personal information
- Born: 6 January 1995 (age 31) North Sydney, New South Wales, Australia
- Years active: since 2009
- Height: 180 cm (5 ft 11 in)
- Weight: 66 kg (146 lb)

Sport
- Country: Australia
- Sport: Rowing
- Events: Women's single scull (W1x); Women's double scull (W2x); Women's coxless pair (W2-); Women's eight (W8+)
- Club: Mosman Rowing Club; Sydney University Boat Club
- Coached by: Tom Westgarth

Achievements and titles
- Olympic finals: Tokyo 2020 W8+
Medal record
Women's rowing
Representing Australia
World Rowing U23 Championships
Silver medal – second place	2017 Plovdiv	W2x
Bronze medal – third place	2014 Varese	W2-
Junior World Championships
Gold medal – first place	2013 Trakai	W2-

Genevieve Horton (born 6 January 1995) is an Australian rower, a dual Olympian, a junior world champion and an Australian national champion. She competed in the women's double sculls event at the 2016 Summer Olympics and is the 2019 Australian national champion in the women's single scull. She rowed in the Australian women's eight at the Tokyo 2020 Olympics.

== Club and state rowing ==
Horton was raised in Pymble, Sydney and attended Pymble Ladies College where she took up rowing. Her senior rowing has from the Mosman Rowing Club and the Sydney University Boat Club.

Horton's first state selection for New South Wales was in 2013 in women's youth eight contesting the Bicentennial Cup at the Interstate Regatta within the Australian Rowing Championships. She rowed again in 2014 in the New South Wales youth eight in 2014. In 2015, 2016, 2018, 2019 and 2021 she was selected in the New South Wales senior women's eight competing for the Queen's Cup at the Interstate Regatta. She stroked that eight in 2016 and rowed to a victory in 2019. In 2017 and 2019 she was New South Wales's single sculls representative and competed for the Nell Slatter Trophy. She placed third in 2017 and won that national title in 2019.

In SUBC colours she contested the women's single and double scull national titles at the 2017 and 2019 Australian Rowing Championships. She won the open women's single scull championship in 2019. In 2021 in a National Training Centre eight she won the open women's eight title at the Australian Championships.

== International representative rowing ==
Horton's Australian representative debut year in 2013 at age eighteen was comprehensive as that year she raced in the Australian women's senior eight to gold at the World Rowing Cup I in Sydney; in a coxless pair with Jessie Allen to fourth place at the World Rowing U23 Championships in Linz and to the gold medal at the 2013 Junior World Rowing Championships in Trakai, Lithuania. The following year she again contested the World Rowing U23 Championships which were in Varese, Italy where she and Allen placed third.

Horton stayed in the Australian coxless pair in 2015 representing at the senior level with Molly Goodman. They competed at two World Rowing Cups in Europe before contesting the 2015 World Rowing Championships in Aiguebelette and coming away with a world thirteenth ranking.

In the 2016 Olympic year Horton moved back into sculls and was selected as Australia's double scull representative with Sally Kehoe. In their Olympic lead up they raced at two World Rowing Cups in Europe before competing in that boat class at the 2016 Rio Olympics. Kehoe and Horton were eliminated at the semi-final stage and ultimately raced in a B final.

In 2017 as an Olympian and in her fifth year of national representative selection Horton was still eligible to race underage and was selected in the Australian quad scull which won a silver medal at the World Rowing U23 Championships in Plovdiv, Bulgaria. With Harriet Hudson changed out for Leah Saunders, Horton, Rowena Meredith and Caitlin Cronin also raced to medal placings at two World Rowing Cups in 2017 and then at the World Championships in Sarasota, Florida. The young crew took on a tightly packed field in the final at Sarasota and were fourth at the halfway mark with Poland in the lead followed by The Netherlands. As the crews sprinted for the line, the Australian quad featuring three senior team debutantes other than Horton, dropped back and finished in sixth place.

The quad stayed together into 2018 with Olympia Aldersey changed out for Leah Saunders. At the 2018 World Rowing Cup II in Linz, they rowed to a bronze medal. In 2019 Horton was again picked in Australian women's sculling squad for the international season. Rowing with Amanda Bateman she stroked the Australian women's double scull to a bronze medal at the World Rowing Cup II in Poznan and to a silver medal at WRC III in Rotterdam. Horton and Bateman were selected to race Australia's double scull at the 2019 World Rowing Championships in Linz, Austria. The double were looking for a top eleven finish at the 2019 World Championships to qualify for the Tokyo Olympics. They won their heat and placed fourth in their semi-final. They finished fifth in the B-final for an overall eleventh world place and qualified the boat for Tokyo 2020.

At the Tokyo 2020 Olympics, the Australian women's eight were placed third in their heat, fourth in the repechage and fifth in the Olympic A final. Had they managed to maintain their time of 5:57:15 that they achieved in their repechage they would have beaten the winners, Canada, by nearly two seconds and won the gold medal.
