= Maria Wierzbowska =

Polish rower (born 1995)

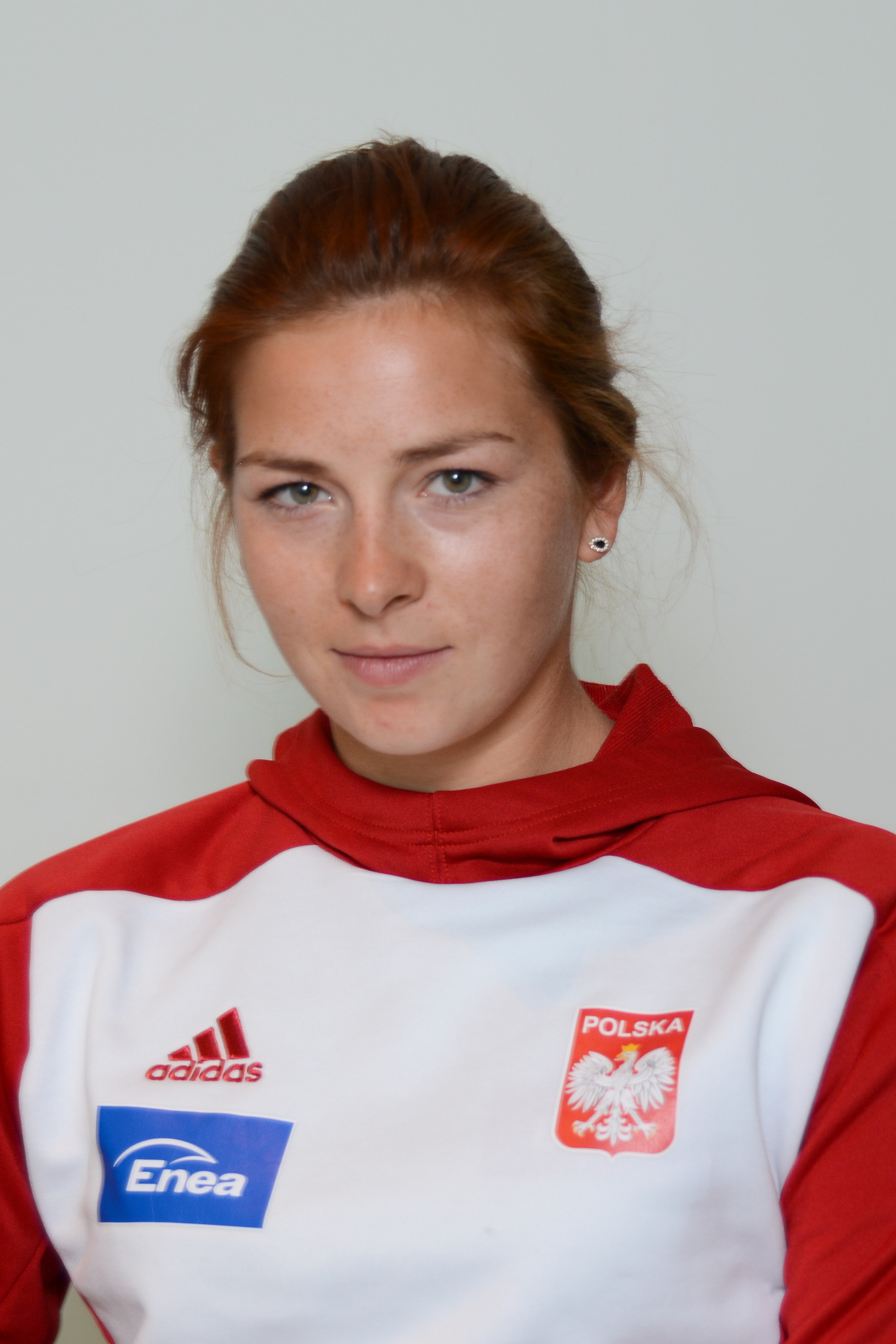

Personal information
- Born: 13 February 1995 (age 31) Kraków, Poland

Sport
- Sport: Rowing

Achievements and titles
- Olympic finals: Tokyo 2020 W4-
Medal record
Women's rowing
Representing Poland
World Championships
Silver medal – second place	2017 Sarasota	Coxless four
European Championships
Silver medal – second place	2017 Račice	Coxless four
Bronze medal – third place	2018 Glasgow	Coxless four
Bronze medal – third place	2019 Lucerne	Coxless four

Maria Wierzbowska (born 13 February 1995) is a Polish rower. She competed in the women's coxless pair event at the 2016 Summer Olympics.
