= Erin Boxberger =

American rower (born 1993)

Personal information
- Nationality: American
- Born: May 26, 1993 (age 33) Shawnee, Kansas
- Height: 5 ft 11 in (1.80 m)

Sport
- Country: United States
- Sport: Rowing
- Event: Coxless four
- College team: Notre Dame Fighting Irish
Medal record
Women's rowing
Representing United States
World Championships
| Gold medal – first place | 2018 Plovdiv | Coxless four |

Erin Boxberger (born May 26, 1993) is an American rower. In the 2018 World Rowing Championships, she won a gold medal in the women's coxless four event.
