= Rebecca Muzerie =

British rower

Beccy Muzerie
Personal information
- Birth name: Rebecca Louise Girling
- Full name: Rebecca Louise Muzerie
- Born: 3 December 1989 (age 35); Fareham, England
- Height: 182 cm (6 ft 0 in)

Sport
- Sport: Rowing
- Club: Molesey Boat Club

Rebecca Louise Muzerie (née Girling, born 3 December 1989) is a British rower.

== Rowing career ==
She has been selected for the British team to compete in the rowing events, in the eight for the 2020 Summer Olympics.
