= Ślesin, Kuyavian-Pomeranian Voivodeship =

Ślesin
- Village
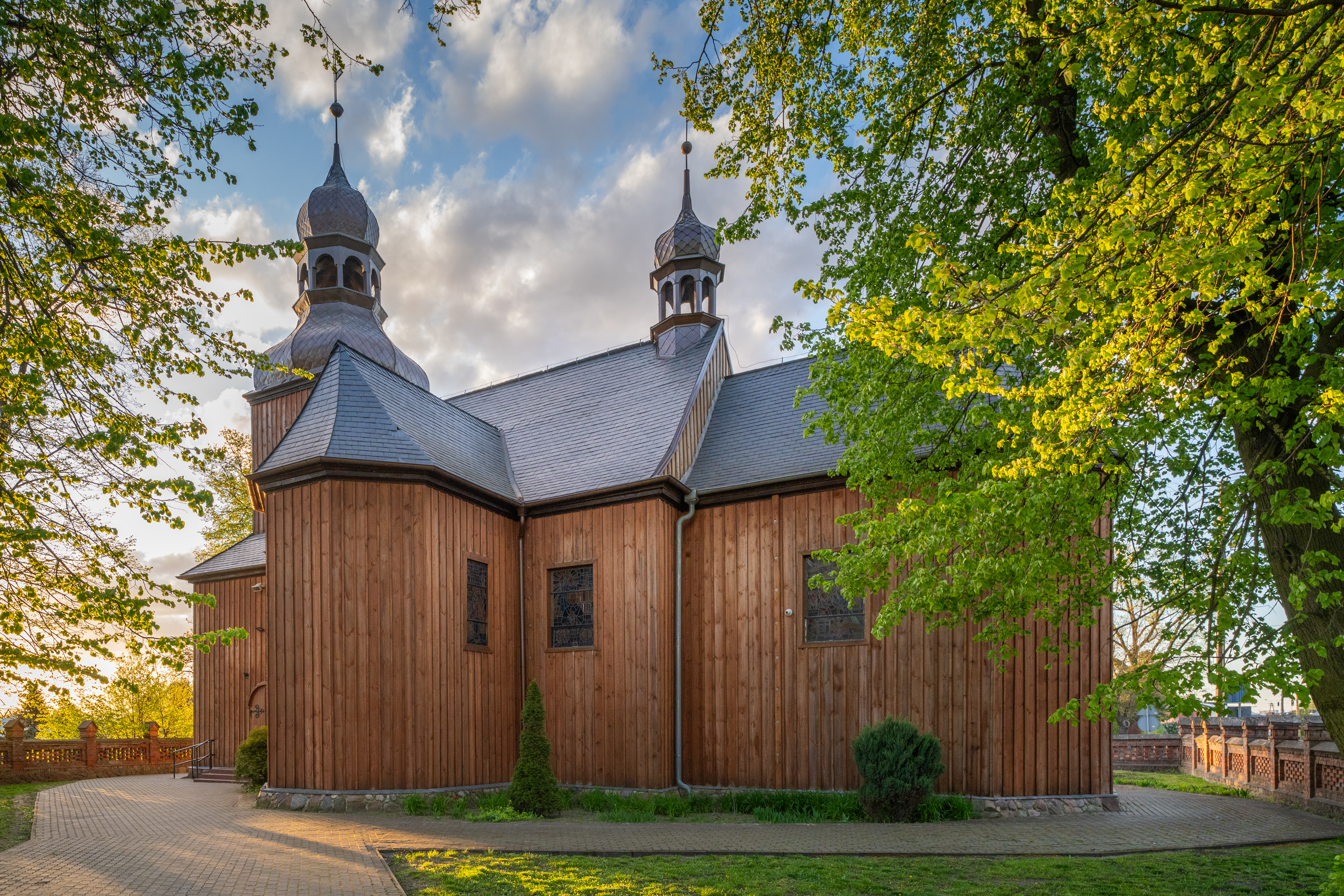
- Saint Nicholas Church

- Location within Poland
- Coordinates: 53°9′N 17°42′E
- Country: Poland
- Voivodeship: Kuyavian-Pomeranian
- County: Nakło
- Gmina: Nakło nad Notecią
- Population: 1,500

Ślesin [ˈɕlɛɕin] is a village in the administrative district of Gmina Nakło nad Notecią, within Nakło County, Kuyavian-Pomeranian Voivodeship, in north-central Poland.
