= Josephine Wratten =

British rower

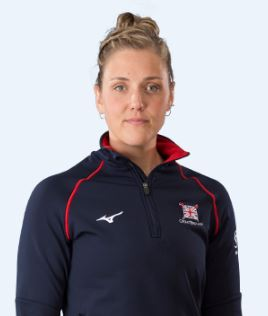

Personal information
- Nationality: British
- Born: 23 March 1992 (age 34) Middlesbrough, England
- Height: 182 cm (5.97 ft)

Sport
- Country: Great Britain
- Sport: Rowing
- Club: Leander Club Tees Rowing Club
Medal record
Women's rowing
Representing Great Britain
European Championships
Silver medal – second place	2019 Lucerne	Eight

Josephine Wratten (born 23 March 1992) is a British rower. She was born in Middlesbrough and was a member of the nearby Tees Rowing Club in Stockton-on-Tees, England.

She was scouted by World Class Start and began rowing at the age of 16. After becoming a regular in the Great British senior setup Josephine relocated to Henley and joined Leander Club.

== Achievements ==
=== Great Britain ===
- 2017, 4th, European Championships, Racice (W8+)
- 2017, Silver, World Rowing Cup II, Poznan (W8+)
- 2017, Bronze, World Rowing Cup III, Lucerne (W8+)
- 2017, 5th, World Championships, Sarasota-Bradenton (W8+)
- 2018, 4th, European Championships, Glasgow (W4-)
- 2019, Silver, European Championships, Lucerne (W8+)

=== U23 ===
- 2012, 4th, U23 World Championships, Trakai
- 2013, Silver, U23 World Championships, Linz (W8+)
- 2014, 5th, U23 World Championships, Varese (W4x)

=== Teesside University ===
- 2013, Bronze, European University Championships, Poznan (W1x)

=== Other ===
- 2012, Winner, Henley Women's Regatta (Elite W8+)
- 2013, Winner, Henley Women's Regatta (Elite W8+)
