= Sara Parfett =

British rower

Personal information
- Born: 8 October 1991 (age 33); Rochester, England
- Height: 177 cm (5 ft 10 in)

Sport
- Sport: Rowing
- Club: University of London Boat Club

Sara Parfett (born 8 October 1991) is a British rower.

== Rowing career ==
She has been selected for the British team to compete in the rowing events, in the eight for the 2020 Summer Olympics.
