= Alexandra Höffgen =

German rower (born 1993)

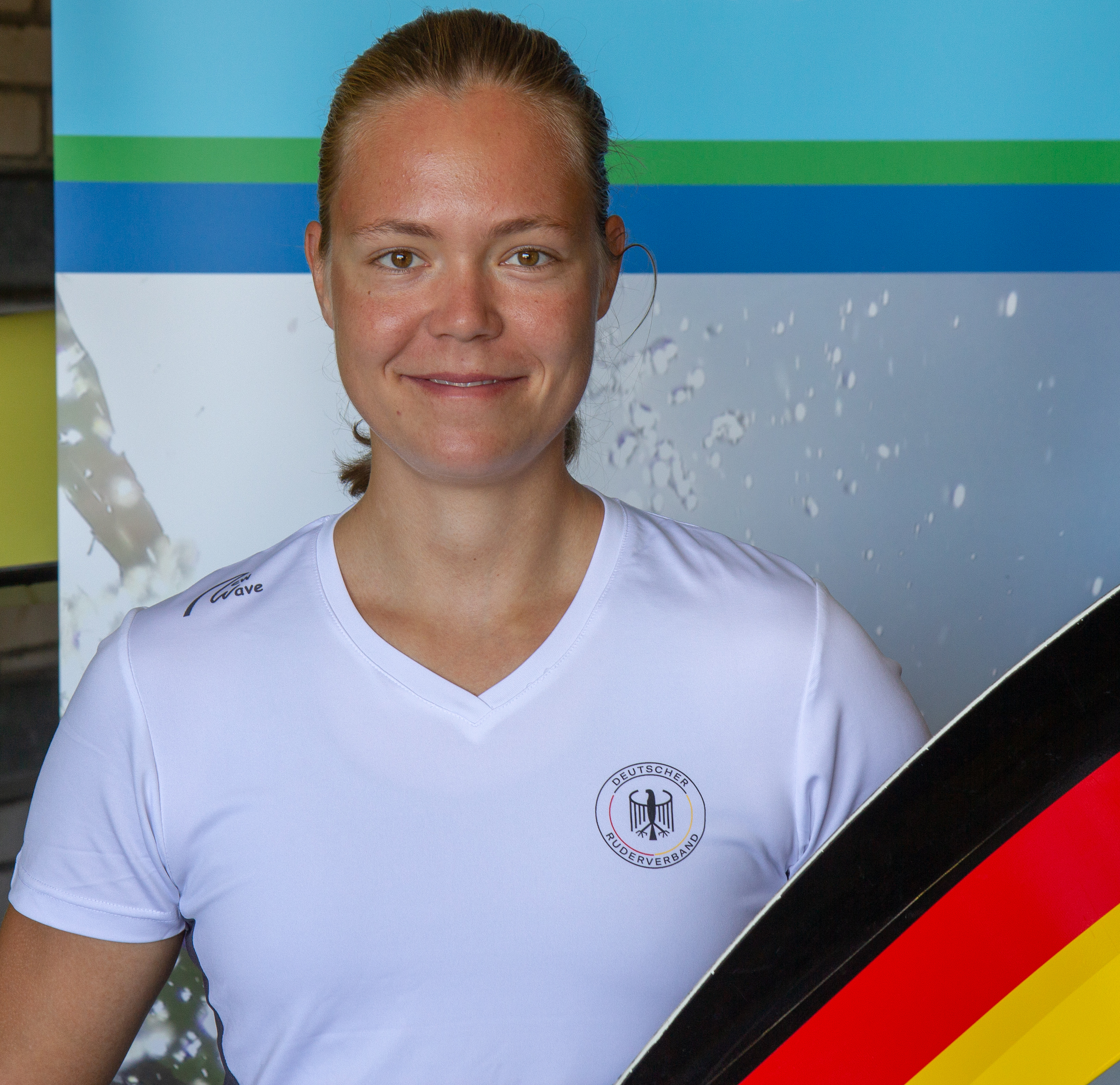

Personal information
- Born: 29 October 1993 (age 32) Dortmund, Germany
- Height: 187 cm (6 ft 2 in)
- Weight: 80 kg (176 lb)

Sport
- Country: Germany
- Sport: Rowing
Medal record
Rowing
Representing Germany
World U23 Championships
Bronze medal – third place	2013 Linz Ottensheim	W8+
Bronze medal – third place	2014 Varese	W8+
European Championships
Silver medal – second place	2020 Poznan	W8+
Bronze medal – third place	2014 Belgrade	W8+

Alexandra Julia Höffgen (born 29 October 1993) is a German rower who competes in international level events. She is a double World U23 medalist and a double European medalist in the women's eights.

Höffgen was a former basketball player who played at the 2010 Summer Youth Olympics in Singapore where she finished eighth in the girls' basketball tournament before she switched to rowing in 2011.
