= Erin Reelick =

American rower (born 1993)

Personal information
- Nationality: American
- Born: December 13, 1993 (age 32) Torrington, Connecticut
- Height: 6 ft 0 in (1.83 m)

Sport
- Country: United States
- Sport: Rowing
- Events: Coxless four, Eight
- College team: Princeton Tigers
Medal record
Women's rowing
Representing United States
World Championships
Gold medal – first place	2018 Plovdiv	Coxless four
Bronze medal – third place	2019 Ottensheim	Eight

Erin Reelick (born December 13, 1993) is an American rower. In the 2018 World Rowing Championships, she won a gold medal in the women's coxless four event.
