= 2015 European Rowing Championships =

Championship held in Poznań, Poland 2015

- Location: Poznań, Poland
- Dates: 29–31 May 2015

The 2015 European Rowing Championships were held in Poznań, Poland, between 29 and 31 May 2015.

== Medal summary ==
=== Men ===
| Event | Gold | Time | Silver | Time | Bronze | Time |
|---|---|---|---|---|---|---|
| M1x | Damir Martin (CRO) | 6:41.65 | Ondřej Synek (CZE) | 6:46.40 | Olaf Tufte (NOR) | 6:46.61 |
| M2- | Great Britain (GBR); James Foad; Matt Langridge | 6:27.89 | France (FRA); Germain Chardin; Dorian Mortelette | 6:28.16 | Serbia (SRB); Miloš Vasić; Nenad Beđik | 6:28.94 |
| M2x | Germany (GER); Marcel Hacker; Stephan Krüger | 6:09.32 | France (FRA); Hugo Boucheron; Matthieu Androdias | 6:11.14 | Ukraine (UKR); Serhiy Hryn; Ivan Futryk | 6:15.80 |
| M4- | Great Britain (GBR); Nathaniel Reilly-O'Donnell; Alan Sinclair; Tom Ransley; Scott Durant | 5:55.70 | Greece (GRE); Ioannis Tsilis; Dionisis Angelopoulos; Georgios Tziallas; Ioannis Christou | 5:57.00 | Belarus (BLR); Vadzim Lialin; Dzianis Mihal; Mikalai Sharlap; Ihar Pashevich | 5:57.67 |
| M4x | Russia (RUS); Vladislav Ryabtsev; Pavel Sorin; Vyacheslav Mikhaylevsky; Sergey Fedorovtsev | 5:45.61 | Ukraine (UKR); Dmytro Mikhay; Artem Morozov; Oleksandr Nadtoka; Ivan Dovhodko | 5:46.26 | Great Britain (GBR); Jack Beaumont; Sam Townsend; Graeme Thomas; Peter Lambert | 5:46.89 |
| M8+ | Germany (GER); Maximilian Munski; Malte Jakschik; Maximilian Reinelt; Eric Johannesen; Anton Braun; Felix Drahotta; Richard Schmidt; Hannes Ocik; Martin Sauer | 5:24.23 | Great Britain (GBR); Matt Gotrel; Stewart Innes; Pete Reed; Paul Bennett; Moe Sbihi; Alex Gregory; George Nash; Will Satch; Phelan Hill | 5:26.29 | Russia (RUS); Anton Zarutskiy; Dmitriy Kuznetsov; Artyom Kosov; Nikita Morgachyov; Ivan Balandin; Georgiy Efremenko; Ivan Podshivalov; Aleksandr Kulesh; Pavel Safonkin | 5:27.34 |
| LM1x | Pierre Houin (FRA) | 6:54.48 | Lukáš Babač (SVK) | 6:56.36 | Rajko Hrvat (SLO) | 6:57.29 |
| LM2- | Great Britain (GBR); Joel Cassells; Peter Chambers | 6:28.58 | France (FRA); Augustin Mouterde; Théophile Onfroy | 6:28.88 | Germany (GER); Jonas Kilthau; Sven Keßler | 6:34.60 |
| LM2x | France (FRA); Stany Delayre; Jérémie Azou | 6:11.38 | Great Britain (GBR); Richard Chambers; William Fletcher | 6:14.33 | Norway (NOR); Kristoffer Brun; Are Strandli | 6:15.53 |
| LM4- | Switzerland (SUI); Simon Schürch; Mario Gyr; Lucas Tramèr; Simon Niepmann | 5:52.27 | France (FRA); Thibault Colard; Guillaume Raineau; Thomas Baroukh; Franck Solforosi | 5:53.69 | Denmark (DEN); Kasper Winther Jørgensen; Jens Vilhelmsen; Jacob Barsøe; Jacob Larsen | 5:53.76 |

Three members of the Russian M4x crew were under investigation for anti-doping violations in 2014.

=== Women ===
| Event | Gold | Time | Silver | Time | Bronze | Time |
|---|---|---|---|---|---|---|
| W1x | Miroslava Knapková (CZE) | 7:30.24 | Jeannine Gmelin (SUI) | 7:32.00 | Tatsiana Kukhta (BLR) | 7:33.16 |
| W2- | Great Britain (GBR); Helen Glover; Heather Stanning | 6:58.28 | Netherlands (NED); Ellen Hogerwerf; Olivia van Rooijen | 7:04.98 | Romania (ROU); Cristina Grigoraș; Laura Oprea | 7:12.56 |
| W2x | Poland (POL); Magdalena Fularczyk; Natalia Madaj | 6:55.58 | Lithuania (LTU); Donata Vištartaitė; Milda Valčiukaitė | 6:57.08 | Great Britain (GBR); Victoria Thornley; Katherine Grainger | 6:59.63 |
| W4x | Germany (GER); Annekatrin Thiele; Marie-Cathérine Arnold; Carina Bär; Lisa Schmidla | 6:18.93 | Netherlands (NED); Nicole Beukers; Chantal Achterberg; Inge Janssen; Carline Bouw | 6:19.54 | Poland (POL); Agnieszka Kobus; Joanna Leszczyńska; Maria Springwald; Monika Ciaciuch | 6:20.87 |
| W8+ | Russia (RUS); Julia Kalinovskaya; Yulia Inozemtseva; Elena Lebedeva; Anastasia Tikhanova; Anastasia Karabelshchikova; Aleksandra Fedorova; Julia Popova; Alevtina Savkina; Ksenia Volkova | 6:08.06 | Netherlands (NED); Monica Lanz; Jenny De Jong; Lies Rustenburg; Sophie Souwer; Aletta Jorritsma; Claudia Belderbos; Wianka van Dorp; Heleen Boers | 6:09.70 | Romania (ROU); Mădălina Bereș; Denisa Tîlvescu; Mihaela Petrilă; Ioana Crăciun; Adelina Cojocariu; Irina Dorneanu; Roxana Cogianu; Andreea Boghian; Daniela Druncea | 6:12.99 |
| LW1x | Imogen Walsh (GBR) | 7:37.37 | Emma Fredh (SWE) | 7:37.37 | Judith Anlauf (DEU) | 7:41.82 |
| LW2x | Great Britain (GBR); Charlotte Taylor; Katherine Copeland | 7:00.71 | Germany (GER); Fini Sturm; Marie-Louise Dräger | 7:05.27 | Poland (POL); Joanna Dorociak; Weronika Deresz | 7:05.36 |

=== Medal table ===
| Rank | Nation | Gold | Silver | Bronze | Total |
|---|---|---|---|---|---|
| 1 | Great Britain | 6 | 2 | 2 | 10 |
| 2 | Germany | 3 | 1 | 2 | 6 |
| 3 | France | 2 | 4 | 0 | 6 |
| 4 | Russia | 2 | 0 | 1 | 3 |
| 5 | Czech Republic | 1 | 1 | 0 | 2 |
| 5 | Switzerland | 1 | 1 | 0 | 2 |
| 7 | Poland | 1 | 0 | 2 | 3 |
| 8 | Croatia | 1 | 0 | 0 | 1 |
| 9 | Netherlands | 0 | 3 | 0 | 3 |
| 10 | Ukraine | 0 | 1 | 1 | 2 |
| 11 | Greece | 0 | 1 | 0 | 1 |
| 11 | Lithuania | 0 | 1 | 0 | 1 |
| 11 | Slovakia | 0 | 1 | 0 | 1 |
| 11 | Sweden | 0 | 1 | 0 | 1 |
| 15 | Belarus | 0 | 0 | 2 | 2 |
| 15 | Norway | 0 | 0 | 2 | 2 |
| 15 | Romania | 0 | 0 | 2 | 2 |
| 18 | Denmark | 0 | 0 | 1 | 1 |
| 18 | Serbia | 0 | 0 | 1 | 1 |
| 18 | Slovenia | 0 | 0 | 1 | 1 |
| Totals (20 entries) | | 17 | 17 | 17 | 51 |

=== Participating nations ===
Athletes from 36 countries participated in the championships.

- Austria (14)
- Azerbaijan (4)
- Belgium (2)
- Belarus (30)
- Bulgaria (4)
- Croatia (9)
- Cyprus (1)
- Czech Republic (29)
- Denmark (18)
- Estonia (6)
- Finland (7)
- France (40)
- Great Britain (52)
- Germany (49)
- Greece (15)
- Hungary (9)
- Ireland (14)
- Israel (2)
- Latvia (3)
- Lithuania (11)
- Moldova (2)
- Malta (4)
- Netherlands (41)
- Norway (10)
- Poland (40)
- Portugal (3)
- Romania (22)
- Russia (45)
- Slovenia (3)
- Serbia (13)
- Spain (16)
- Switzerland (15)
- Slovakia (1)
- Sweden (4)
- Turkey (9)
- Ukraine (44)
