= 2016 European Rowing Championships =

Rowing event held in Brandenburg

- Venue: Beetzsee
- Location: Brandenburg an der Havel, Germany
- Dates: 6–8 May 2016

The 2016 European Rowing Championships were held in Brandenburg an der Havel, Germany, between 6 and 8 May 2016.

== Medal summary ==
=== Men ===
Event	Gold	Time	Silver	Time	Bronze	Time
M1x	Croatia (CRO); Damir Martin	8:05.59	Lithuania (LTU); Mindaugas Griškonis	8:19.30	Czech Republic (CZE); Ondřej Synek	8:25.40
M2-	Hungary (HUN); Adrián Juhász; Béla Simon	7:05.70	Great Britain (GBR); Alan Sinclair; Stewart Innes	7:06.28	Netherlands (NED); Roel Braas; Mitchel Steenman	7:06.78
M2x	Croatia (CRO); Martin Sinković; Valent Sinković	7:06.33	Germany (GER); Marcel Hacker; Stephan Krüger	7:14.22	Lithuania (LTU); Rolandas Maščinskas; Saulius Ritter	7:17.79
M4-	Great Britain (GBR); Alex Gregory; Moe Sbihi; George Nash; Constantine Louloudis	6:18.93	Belarus (BLR); Vadzim Lialin; Dzianis Mihal; Mikalai Sharlap; Ihar Pashevich	6:20.91	France (FRA); Valentin Onfroy; Benjamin Lang; Mickaël Marteau; Théophile Onfroy	6:21.55
M4x	Estonia (EST); Andrei Jämsä; Allar Raja; Tõnu Endrekson; Kaspar Taimsoo	6:29.82	Lithuania (LTU); Dovydas Nemeravičius; Martynas Džiaugys; Dominykas Jančionis; Aurimas Adomavičius	6:31.98	Russia (RUS); Nikita Morgachyov; Artyom Kosov; Vladislav Ryabtsev; Sergey Fedorovtsev	6:32.27
M8+	Germany (GER); Maximilian Munski; Malte Jakschik; Andreas Kuffner; Felix Drahotta; Maximilian Reinelt; Eric Johannesen; Richard Schmidt; Hannes Ocik; Martin Sauer	6:16.65	Russia (RUS); Roman Lomachev; Lev Gritsenko; Maksim Golubev; Pavel Sorin; Viacheslav Mikhaylevskiy; Aleksandr Kornilov; Semen Yaganov; Daniil Andrienko; Pavel Safonkin	6:17.43	Great Britain (GBR); Matt Gotrel; Scott Durant; Tom Ransley; Paul Bennett; Pete Reed; Andrew Triggs Hodge; Matt Langridge; Will Satch; Phelan Hill	6:20.39
LM1x	Lukáš Babač (SVK)	7:33.42	Konstantin Steinhübel (GER)	7:35.54	Rajko Hrvat (SLO)	7:36.72
LM2-	Great Britain (GBR); Sam Scrimgeour; Joel Cassells	7:00.38	Denmark (DEN); Emil Espensen; Jens Vilhelmsen	7:03.94	Spain (ESP); Sergio Pérez Moreno; Jesús González Álvarez	7:05.32
LM2x	Ireland (IRL); Gary O'Donovan; Paul O'Donovan	6:57.76	Germany (GER); Moritz Moos; Jason Osborne	6:59.54	Norway (NOR); Kristoffer Brun; Are Strandli	7:00.52
LM4-	Switzerland (SUI); Lucas Tramèr; Simon Schürch; Simon Niepmann; Mario Gyr	6:45.24	Great Britain (GBR); Chris Bartley; Mark Aldred; Jono Clegg; Peter Chambers	6:47.73	Germany (GER); Jonathan Koch; Lucas Schäfer; Tobias Franzmann; Lars Wichert	6:51.66

=== Women ===
Event	Gold	Time	Silver	Time	Bronze	Time
W1x	Magdalena Lobnig (AUT)	9:22.32	Elza Gulbe (LAT)	9:39.10	Sanita Pušpure (IRL)	9:44.77
W2-	Great Britain (GBR); Helen Glover; Heather Stanning	7:35.93	Germany (GER); Kerstin Hartmann; Kathrin Marchand	7:43.81	Romania (ROU); Mădălina Bereș; Laura Oprea	7:47.18
W2x	Belarus (BLR); Yuliya Bichyk; Tatsiana Kukhta	8:25.91	Germany (GER); Julia Lier; Mareike Adams	8:28.30	Czech Republic (CZE); Kristýna Fleissnerová; Lenka Antošová	8:31.94
W4x	Germany (GER); Annekatrin Thiele; Carina Bär; Marie-Cathérine Arnold; Lisa Schmidla	7:14.31	Poland (POL); Agnieszka Kobus; Joanna Leszczyńska; Maria Springwald; Monika Ciaciuch	7:18.53	Ukraine (UKR); Daryna Verkhohliad; Olena Buryak; Anastasiya Kozhenkova; Ievgeniia Nimchenko	7:21.12
W8+	Great Britain (GBR); Katie Greves; Melanie Wilson; Frances Houghton; Polly Swann; Jessica Eddie; Olivia Carnegie-Brown; Karen Bennett; Zoe Lee; Zoe de Toledo	6:51.46	Netherlands (NED); Wianka van Dorp; Sophie Souwer; Lies Rustenburg; José van Veen; Ellen Hogerwerf; Claudia Belderbos; Monica Lanz; Olivia van Rooijen; Ae-Ri Noort	6:51.83	Russia (RUS); Julia Kalinovskaya; Yulia Inozemtseva; Julia Popova; Alevtina Savkina; Anastasia Karabelshchikova; Aleksandra Fedorova; Elena Lebedeva; Elena Oriabinskaia; Ksenia Volkova	6:55.43
LW1x	Anja Noske (GER)	8:26.75	Rungeaja Holmegaard (DEN)	8:32.54	Elisabeth Woerner (NED)	8:37.05
LW2x	Netherlands (NED); Ilse Paulis; Maaike Head	7:40.50	Germany (GER); Fini Sturm; Marie-Louise Dräger	7:42.79	Poland (POL); Joanna Dorociak; Weronika Deresz	7:44.88

=== Medal table ===
Rank	Nation	Gold	Silver	Bronze	Total
1	Great Britain	4	2	1	7
2	Germany	3	6	1	10
3	Croatia	2	0	0	2
4	Netherlands	1	1	2	4
5	Belarus	1	1	0	2
6	Ireland	1	0	1	2
7	Austria	1	0	0	1
7	Estonia	1	0	0	1
7	Hungary	1	0	0	1
7	Slovakia	1	0	0	1
7	Switzerland	1	0	0	1
12	Lithuania	0	2	1	3
13	Denmark	0	2	0	2
14	Russia	0	1	2	3
15	Poland	0	1	1	2
16	Latvia	0	1	0	1
17	Czech Republic	0	0	2	2
18	France	0	0	1	1
18	Norway	0	0	1	1
18	Romania	0	0	1	1
18	Slovenia	0	0	1	1
18	Spain	0	0	1	1
18	Ukraine	0	0	1	1
Totals (23 entries)		17	17	17	51
