= Switzerland at the 2016 Summer Olympics =

- IOC code: SUI
- NOC: Swiss Olympic Association
- Website: www.swissolympic.ch (in German and French)

in Rio de Janeiro
- Competitors: 104 in 17 sports
- Flag bearers: Giulia Steingruber (opening); Nino Schurter (closing)
- Medals Ranked 24th: Gold 3 Silver 2 Bronze 2 Total 7

Summer Olympics appearances (overview)
- 1896; 1900; ~~1904~~; 1908; 1912; 1920; 1924; 1928; 1932; 1936; 1948; 1952; 1956; 1960; 1964; 1968; 1972; 1976; 1980; 1984; 1988; 1992; 1996; 2000; 2004; 2008; 2012; 2016; 2020; 2024; 2028

Other related appearances
- 1906 Intercalated Games

Switzerland competed at the 2016 Summer Olympics in Rio de Janeiro, Brazil, from 5 to 21 August 2016. Swiss athletes have appeared in every edition of the Summer Olympic Games in the modern era, except for a partial boycott of the 1956 Summer Olympics in Melbourne as a protest to the Soviet invasion of Hungary. The Swiss team consisted of 104 athletes, 59 men and 45 women, across seventeen sports.

Switzerland returned home from Rio de Janeiro with seven medals (three golds, two silver, and two bronze), which matched its overall tally from the 1996 Summer Olympics in Atlanta and the 2008 Summer Olympics in Beijing. Two of these medals were awarded to the Swiss team in cycling, with one each in artistic gymnastics, rowing, shooting, tennis, and triathlon.

Among the nation's winners were professional road cyclist Fabian Cancellara, who saved the best race of his storied career for last by reclaiming his men's time trial title for the second time (the first did so in Beijing 2008), and mountain biker Nino Schurter, who completed a full set of medals in his career hardware by striking the gold at his third attempt in the men's cross country race. Entering the Games as the reigning world and double European champions, the lightweight four crew of Mario Gyr, Simon Niepmann, Simon Schürch, and Lucas Tramèr propelled their way ahead of their Danish and French rivals to take the country's first ever Olympic title in rowing after two decades.

On the women's side, pistol shooter Heidi Diethelm Gerber, all-around gymnast Giulia Steingruber, and former world-number-one tennis player Martina Hingis, along with her doubles partner Timea Bacsinszky, accomplished their historic feats as the first ever Swiss females to stand on the podium in their respective sporting disciplines. Meanwhile, Nicola Spirig Hug picked up a silver in the women's triathlon to become the first in Olympic history to collect more than a single medal, bowing out her title defense to the world-ranked American challenger Gwen Jorgensen.

== Medalists ==
Medal	Name	Sport	Event	Date
Gold	Fabian Cancellara	Cycling	Men's time trial	10 August
Gold	Mario Gyr; Simon Niepmann; Simon Schürch; Lucas Tramèr	Rowing	Lightweight four	11 August
Gold	Nino Schurter	Cycling	Men's cross country	21 August
Silver	Timea Bacsinszky; Martina Hingis	Tennis	Women's doubles	14 August
Silver	Nicola Spirig Hug	Triathlon	Women's	20 August
Bronze	Heidi Diethelm Gerber	Shooting	Women's 25 m pistol	9 August
Bronze	Giulia Steingruber	Gymnastics	Women's vault	14 August

Medals by sport
Sport	1st place, gold medalist(s)	2nd place, silver medalist(s)	3rd place, bronze medalist(s)	Total
Cycling	2	0	0	2
Gymnastics	0	0	1	1
Rowing	1	0	0	1
Shooting	0	0	1	1
Tennis	0	1	0	1
Triathlon	0	1	0	1
Total	3	2	2	7

== Competitors ==
The Swiss Olympic Association selected a roster of 104 athletes, 59 men and 45 women, to compete across seventeen different sports at these Games; it was the nation's largest delegation ever sent to the Summer Olympics since 1984, without any association to the traditional team-based sports. Moreover, the Swiss team featured the largest share of women in its Summer Olympic history, constituting about 43 percent of the total. Roughly three quarters of the nation's roster made their Olympic debut in Rio de Janeiro, with the remainder having attended at least a single edition.

These Games also witnessed the Swiss male gymnasts compete for the first time in the team all-around tournament since 1992. Athletics and cycling accounted for the largest number of competitors on the Swiss roster, with 16 entries each, respectively.

Three of the nation's medalists from London 2012 returned, with equestrian show jumper Steve Guerdat and triathlete Nicola Spirig Hug looking to defend their titles in Rio de Janeiro, and with mountain biker Nino Schurter hoping to complete his collection of Olympic medals for gold at his third attempt. Professional road cyclist and 2008 time trial champion Fabian Cancellara joined an exclusive club of Swiss athletes, along with Guerdat, Spirig Hug, and 2004 bronze medalist Sven Riederer (men's triathlon), who earned four consecutive trips to the Games, aiming to close out his stellar sporting career with another golden finish in the same event.

Other notable athletes on the Swiss team included the rowing quartet of Mario Gyr, Simon Niepmann, Simon Schürch, and Lucas Tramèr, who entered the Games as the defending world and two-time European champions in the men's lightweight four; former single-handed sailor Nathalie Brugger and her Argentine-born partner Matías Bühler in the inaugural Nacra 17 catamaran; pole vaulter Nicole Büchler; European Games champion Heidi Diethelm Gerber in the women's pistol shooting; and former world-number-one tennis player Martina Hingis, who returned to the Olympic scene from her 20-year absence to compete alongside her partner Timea Bacsinszky in the women's doubles. Artistic gymnast and 2015 European all-around champion Giulia Steingruber was selected by the association to carry the Swiss flag in the opening ceremony, the first by a female since 1988 and third overall in Summer Olympic history.

New York-based golfer Albane Valenzuela (aged 18) was Switzerland's youngest competitor of the Games, with lone dressage rider Marcela Krinke-Susmelj rounding out the lineup as the oldest member (aged 50).

The following is the list of number of competitors in the Games. Note that reserves in fencing, field hockey, football, and handball are not counted as athletes:

Sport	Men	Women	Total
Athletics	3	13	16
Badminton	0	1	1
Canoeing	3	0	3
Cycling	14	2	16
Equestrian	5	2	7
Fencing	4	1	5
Golf	0	2	2
Gymnastics	5	1	6
Judo	2	1	3
Rowing	10	1	11
Sailing	6	3	9
Shooting	1	3	4
Swimming	3	5	8
Synchronized swimming	—	2	2
Tennis	0	2	2
Triathlon	2	2	4
Volleyball	0	4	4
Total	59	45	104

== Athletics ==
Swiss athletes have so far achieved qualifying standards in the following athletics events (up to a maximum of 3 athletes in each event):

On May 5, 2016, the Swiss Olympic Association had selected three marathon runners (Abraham, Kreienbühl, and Neuenschwander), who achieved the federation's entry standards, for the Olympics. Fourteen more athletes (one man and thirteen women) rounded out the Swiss track and field team for the Games at the end of the qualifying period on July 11, 2016.

Key

- Note–Ranks given for track events are within the athlete's heat only
- Q = Qualified for the next round
- q = Qualified for the next round as a fastest loser or, in field events, by position without achieving the qualifying target
- NR = National record
- N/A = Round not applicable for the event
- Bye = Athlete not required to compete in round

Track & road events
Men

Athlete	Event	Heat		Semifinal		Final	
Athlete	Event	Result	Rank	Result	Rank	Result	Rank
Tadesse Abraham	Marathon	—N/a				2:11:42	7
Kariem Hussein	400 m hurdles	49.80	5	Did not advance			
Christian Kreienbühl	Marathon	—N/a				2:21:13	76

Women

Athlete	Event	Heat		Quarterfinal		Semifinal		Final	
Athlete	Event	Result	Rank	Result	Rank	Result	Rank	Result	Rank
Selina Büchel	800 m	1:59.00	1 Q	—N/a		1:59.35	3	Did not advance	
Petra Fontanive	400 m hurdles	56.80	6	—N/a		Did not advance			
Mujinga Kambundji	100 m	Bye		11.19	3 q	11.16	6	Did not advance	
Mujinga Kambundji	200 m	22.78	3 q	—N/a		22.83	6	Did not advance	
Maja Neuenschwander	Marathon	—N/a						2:34:27	29
Clélia Reuse	100 m hurdles	12.91	4 q	—N/a		12.96	5	Did not advance	
Fabienne Schlumpf	3000 m steeplechase	9:30.54	6 q	—N/a				9:59.30	18
Léa Sprunger	400 m hurdles	56.58	4	—N/a		Did not advance			
Sarah Atcho; Ajla del Ponte; Mujinga Kambundji; Salomé Kora; Marisa Lavanchy; Ellen Sprunger	4 × 100 m relay	43.12	5	—N/a				Did not advance	

Field events

Athlete	Event	Qualification		Final	
Athlete	Event	Distance	Position	Distance	Position
Nicole Büchler	Women's pole vault	4.55	=8 q	4.70	6
Angelica Moser	Women's pole vault	4.45	23	Did not advance	

== Badminton ==
Switzerland has qualified one badminton player for the women's singles into the Olympic tournament. London 2012 Olympian Sabrina Jaquet picked up one of the spare athlete berths from the doubles as the next highest-ranked eligible player in the BWF World Rankings as of 5 May 2016.

Athlete	Event	Group Stage			Elimination	Quarterfinal	Semifinal	Final / BM	
Athlete	Event	Opposition Score	Opposition Score	Rank	Opposition Score	Opposition Score	Opposition Score	Opposition Score	Rank
Sabrina Jaquet	Women's singles	Gilmour (GBR); L (15–21, 17–21)	Zechiri (BUL); L (15–21, 17–21)	3	Did not advance				

== Canoeing ==
=== Slalom ===
Switzerland has qualified a pair of canoeists in the men's C-2 class by obtaining a top finish and an outright Olympic berth at the 2016 European Canoe Slalom Championships in Liptovský Mikuláš, Slovakia. The slalom canoeists were named to the Swiss team on May 26, 2016.

Athlete	Event	Preliminary						Semifinal		Final	
Athlete	Event	Run 1	Rank	Run 2	Rank	Best	Rank	Time	Rank	Time	Rank
Lukas Werro; Simon Werro	Men's C-2	158.47	11	110.56	6	110.56	9 Q	115.40	9 Q	111.52	9

=== Sprint ===
Switzerland has received a spare berth from the International Canoe Federation to send one canoeist competing in the men's K-1 1000 m, as a response to the "multiple positive" cases on doping that provoked a one-year suspension for Belarus and Romania.

Athlete	Event	Heats		Semifinals		Final	
Athlete	Event	Time	Rank	Time	Rank	Time	Rank
Fabio Wyss	Men's K-1 1000 m	3:41.985	7	Did not advance			

Qualification Legend: FA = Qualify to final (medal); FB = Qualify to final B (non-medal)

== Cycling ==
=== Road ===
Swiss riders qualified for the following quota places in the men's and women's Olympic road race by virtue of their top 15 final national ranking in the 2015 UCI World Tour (for men) and top 22 in the UCI World Ranking (for women). The road cycling team, led by two-time Olympic medalist Fabian Cancellara, was officially named to the Swiss cycling roster for the Games on July 1, 2016.

Athlete	Event	Time	Rank
Michael Albasini	Men's road race	Did not finish	
Fabian Cancellara	Men's road race	6:21:54	34
Fabian Cancellara	Men's time trial	1:12:15.42	1st place, gold medalist(s)
Steve Morabito	Men's road race	Did not finish	
Sébastien Reichenbach	Men's road race	6:13:36	19
Jolanda Neff	Women's road race	3:51:47	8

=== Track ===
Following the completion of the 2016 UCI Track Cycling World Championships, Swiss riders have accumulated spots in the men's team pursuit, as well as the men's omnium. The Swiss Olympic Association announced the track cycling squad for the Olympics on March 15, 2016.

Pursuit

Athlete	Event	Qualification		Semifinals		Final	
Athlete	Event	Time	Rank	Opponent Results	Rank	Opponent Results	Rank
Olivier Beer; Silvan Dillier; Frank Pasche; Théry Schir; Cyrille Thièry*	Men's team pursuit	4:03.845	7 Q	Germany; 4:03.580	7	China; 4:01.786	7

Omnium

Athlete	Event	Scratch race		Individual pursuit			Elimination race		Time trial			Flying lap			Points race		Total points	Rank
Athlete	Event	Rank	Points	Time	Rank	Points	Rank	Points	Time	Rank	Points	Time	Rank	Points	Points	Rank	Total points	Rank
Gaël Suter	Men's omnium	15	12	4:36.674	17	17	8	26	1:04.433	13	16	12.981	5	32	13	1	95	12

=== Mountain biking ===
Swiss mountain bikers qualified for three men's and two women's quota places into the Olympic cross-country race, as a result of the nation's top finish for both men and women in the UCI Olympic Ranking List of May 25, 2016. The mountain biking team, highlighted by double Olympic medalist Nino Schurter, was named to the Swiss roster on June 6, 2016.

Athlete	Event	Time	Rank
Lars Förster	Men's cross-country	Did not finish	
Mathias Flückiger	Men's cross-country	1:35:52	6
Nino Schurter	Men's cross-country	1:33:28	1st place, gold medalist(s)
Linda Indergand	Women's cross-country	1:33:27	8
Jolanda Neff	Women's cross-country	1:32:43	6

=== BMX ===
Swiss riders qualified for one men's quota place in BMX at the Olympics, as a result of the nation's ninth-place finish in the UCI Olympic Ranking List of May 31, 2016. BMX rider David Graf was selected to the Swiss team for the Olympics on June 10, 2016.

Athlete	Event	Seeding		Quarterfinal		Semifinal		Final	
Athlete	Event	Result	Rank	Points	Rank	Points	Rank	Result	Rank
David Graf	Men's BMX	34.678	2	14	4 Q	22	7	Did not advance	

== Equestrian ==
Switzerland has qualified a full squad in the team jumping competition after having achieved one of the three Olympic quota places available from the 2015 European Championships. Three more Swiss riders have formed a composite squad to compete in the Olympic team eventing by virtue of the following results in the individual FEI Olympic rankings: a top two finish from European combined ranking, and two top nine finishes from the combined overall FEI Olympic rankings.

=== Dressage ===
Marcela Krinke-Susmelj and her Danish Warmblood Molberg were named to the Swiss roster on June 10, 2016.

Athlete	Horse	Event	Grand Prix		Grand Prix Special		Grand Prix Freestyle		Overall	
Athlete	Horse	Event	Score	Rank	Score	Rank	Technical	Artistic	Score	Rank
Marcela Krinke-Susmelj	Molberg	Individual	72.700	24 Q	72.885	24	Did not advance			

=== Eventing ===
Athlete	Horse	Event	Dressage		Cross-country			Jumping						Total	
Athlete	Horse	Event	Dressage		Cross-country			Qualifier			Final			Total	
Athlete	Horse	Event	Penalties	Rank	Penalties	Total	Rank	Penalties	Total	Rank	Penalties	Total	Rank	Penalties	Rank
Ben Vogg	Noe des Vatys	Individual	51.70	49	82.40	134.10	43	14.00	148.00	43	Did not advance			148.00	43
Felix Vogg	Onfire	Individual	46.70	25	Eliminated			Did not advance							

=== Jumping ===
Athlete	Horse	Event	Qualification								Final					Total	
Athlete	Horse	Event	Round 1		Round 2			Round 3			Round A		Round B			Total	
Athlete	Horse	Event	Penalties	Rank	Penalties	Total	Rank	Penalties	Total	Rank	Penalties	Rank	Penalties	Total	Rank	Penalties	Rank
Romain Duguet	Quorida de Treho	Individual	4	=27 Q	0	4	=15 Q	5	9	=23 Q	12	32	Did not advance			12	32
Martin Fuchs	Clooney	Individual	4 #	=27 Q	0	4	=15 Q	5 #	9	=23 Q	0	=1 Q	4	4	=9	4	=9
Steve Guerdat	Nino des Buissonets	Individual	0	=1 Q	8	8	=30 Q	1	9	=23 Q	0	=1 Q	0	0	=1 JO	4	4
Janika Sprunger	Bonne Chance	Individual	0	=1 Q	8	8 #	=30 Q	1	9	=23*	Did not advance						
Romain Duguet; Martin Fuchs; Steve Guerdat; Janika Sprunger	See above	Team	8	=8	8	—N/a	=7 Q	7	15	6	—N/a					15	6

"#" indicates that the score of this rider does not count in the team competition, since only the best three results of a team are counted.

== Fencing ==
Swiss fencers have qualified a full squad each in the men's team épée by virtue of their top 4 national finish in the FIE Olympic Team Rankings. Meanwhile, London 2012 Olympian Tiffany Géroudet had claimed the sole Olympic spot as the winner of the women's épée at the European Zonal Qualifier in Prague, Czech Republic. The fencing team was named to the Olympic roster on May 31, 2016.

Athlete	Event	Round of 64	Round of 32	Round of 16	Quarterfinal	Semifinal	Final / BM	
Athlete	Event	Opposition Score	Opposition Score	Opposition Score	Opposition Score	Opposition Score	Opposition Score	Rank
Max Heinzer	Men's épée	Bye	Pizzo (ITA); W 15–11	Anokhin (RUS); W 15–7	Park S-y (KOR); L 4–15	Did not advance		
Fabian Kauter	Men's épée	Bye	Herey (UKR); W 15–9	Borel (FRA); L 14–15	Did not advance			
Benjamin Steffen	Men's épée	Bye	Pryor (USA); W 15–14	Nikishyn (UKR); W 15–14	Borel (FRA); W 15–10	Park S-y (KOR); L 9–15	Grumier (FRA); L 11–15	4
Max Heinzer; Fabian Kauter; Benjamin Steffen; Peer Borsky (r)	Men's team épée	—N/a		Bye	Italy; L 32–45	Classification semifinal Russia; W 45–28	5th place final South Korea; L 36–45	6
Tiffany Géroudet	Women's épée	Costa (BRA); L 13–15	Did not advance					

== Golf ==
Switzerland has entered two golfers into the Olympic tournament. Fabienne In-Albon (world no. 408) and Albane Valenzuela (world no. 378) qualified directly among the top 60 eligible players for the women's event based on the IGF World Rankings as of 11 July 2016.

Athlete	Event	Round 1	Round 2	Round 3	Round 4	Total		
Athlete	Event	Score	Score	Score	Score	Score	Par	Rank
Fabienne In-Albon	Women's	74	78	75	79	306	+22	57
Albane Valenzuela	Women's	71	68	72	71	282	−2	=21

== Gymnastics ==
=== Artistic ===
Switzerland has fielded a full squad of five artistic gymnasts (five men and one woman) into the Olympic competition. The men's team qualified through a top eight finish at the 2015 World Artistic Gymnastics Championships in Glasgow, making its first trip to the Games since 1992. Meanwhile, an additional Olympic berth had been awarded to the Swiss female gymnast, who participated in the apparatus and all-around events at the Olympic Test Event in Rio de Janeiro. The artistic gymnastics squad was named to the Swiss roster for the Games on July 8, 2016.

Men
Team

Athlete	Event	Qualification								Final							
Athlete	Event	Apparatus						Total	Rank	Apparatus						Total	Rank
Athlete	Event	F	PH	R	V	PB	HB	Total	Rank	F	PH	R	V	PB	HB	Total	Rank
Christian Baumann	Team	—N/a	14.333	14.133	—N/a	14.933	13.700	—N/a		Did not advance							
Pablo Brägger	Team	14.500	13.933	14.033	13.800	14.833	15.100	86.199	21 Q	Did not advance							
Benjamin Gischard	Team	15.066	—N/a		14.300	—N/a				Did not advance							
Oliver Hegi	Team	13.966	14.066	14.200	14.500	14.333	13.366	84.431	30	Did not advance							
Eddy Yusof	Team	15.033	14.133	14.533	15.200	13.300	13.166	85.365	25 Q	Did not advance							
Total	Team	44.599	42.532	42.866	44.000	44.099	42.166	260.262	9	Did not advance							

Individual finals

Athlete	Event	Apparatus						Total	Rank
Athlete	Event	F	PH	R	V	PB	HB	Total	Rank
Pablo Brägger	All-around	14.933	14.033	13.908	14.300	15.033	15.166	87.373	16
Eddy Yusof	All-around	14.633	14.533	14.716	15.066	14.933	14.533	88.414	12

Women

Athlete	Event	Qualification						Final					
Athlete	Event	Apparatus				Total	Rank	Apparatus				Total	Rank
Athlete	Event	V	UB	BB	F	Total	Rank	V	UB	BB	F	Total	Rank
Giulia Steingruber	All-around	15.600	13.900	12.733	14.666	56.899	15 Q	15.366	13.800	13.666	14.733	57.565	10
Giulia Steingruber	Vault	15.600	—N/a			15.600	5 Q	15.216	—N/a			15.216	3rd place, bronze medalist(s)
Giulia Steingruber	Floor	—N/a			14.666	14.666	3 Q	—N/a			11.800	11.800	8

== Judo ==
Switzerland has qualified three judokas for the following weight classes at the Games. Ciril Grossklaus, Evelyne Schopp, and London 2012 Olympian Ludovic Chammartin were ranked among the top 22 eligible judokas for men and top 14 for women in the IJF World Ranking List of May 30, 2016.

Athlete	Event	Round of 64	Round of 32	Round of 16	Quarterfinals	Semifinals	Repechage	Final / BM	
Athlete	Event	Opposition Result	Opposition Result	Opposition Result	Opposition Result	Opposition Result	Opposition Result	Opposition Result	Rank
Ludovic Chammartin	Men's −60 kg	Bye	Preciado (ECU); W 001–000	Urozboev (UZB); L 000–001	Did not advance				
Ciril Grossklaus	Men's −90 kg	Bye	Iddir (FRA); L 000–000 S	Did not advance					
Evelyne Tschopp	Women's −52 kg	—N/a	Gneto (FRA); W 100–000	Kelmendi (KOS); L 000–100	Did not advance				

== Rowing ==
Switzerland has qualified a total of four boats for each of the following rowing classes into the Olympic regatta. Rowers competing in men's lightweight double sculls, men's lightweight four, men's quadruple sculls, and women's single sculls had confirmed Olympic places for their boats at the 2015 FISA World Championships in Lac d'Aiguebelette, France.

The Swiss Olympic Association announced the first batch of rowers competing in the men's lightweight four and women's single sculls on April 22, 2016. The men's lightweight double sculls rowers (Schmid & Wiederkehr) were named to the Swiss team on May 13, 2016, while the men's quadruple sculls crew rounded out the team selection on June 24, 2016.

Men

Athlete	Event	Heats		Repechage		Semifinals		Final	
Athlete	Event	Time	Rank	Time	Rank	Time	Rank	Time	Rank
Michael Schmid; Daniel Wiederkehr	Lightweight double sculls	6:29.95	3 R	7:07.90	3 SC/D	7:22.15	1 FC	6:42.57	13
Mario Gyr; Simon Niepmann; Simon Schürch; Lucas Tramèr	Lightweight four	6:03.52	3 SA/B	Bye		6:17.85	1 FA	6:20.51	1st place, gold medalist(s)
Barnabé Delarze; Augustin Maillefer; Roman Röösli; Nico Stahlberg	Quadruple sculls	5:51.52	3 R	5:56.13	4 FB	Bye		6:11.18	7

Women

Athlete	Event	Heats		Repechage		Quarterfinals		Semifinals		Final	
Athlete	Event	Time	Rank	Time	Rank	Time	Rank	Time	Rank	Time	Rank
Jeannine Gmelin	Single sculls	8:28.10	2 QF	Bye		7:29.66	2 SA/B	7:49.83	3 FA	7:29.69	5

Qualification Legend: FA=Final A (medal); FB=Final B (non-medal); FC=Final C (non-medal); FD=Final D (non-medal); FE=Final E (non-medal); FF=Final F (non-medal); SA/B=Semifinals A/B; SC/D=Semifinals C/D; SE/F=Semifinals E/F; QF=Quarterfinals; R=Repechage

== Sailing ==
Swiss sailors have qualified one boat in each of the following classes through the 2014 ISAF Sailing World Championships, the individual fleet Worlds, and European qualifying regattas. They also picked up a spare Olympic berth freed by Africa as the next highest-ranked eligible crew in the women's 470 based on the results at the 2015 World Championships.

The entire sailing squad was named to the Swiss team on May 9, 2016, with Nathalie Brugger (Nacra 17) and the men's 470 crew Yannick Brauchli and Romuald Hausser remarkably going to their third Olympics. 49er crew members Lucien Cujean and Sébastien Schneiter were added to Switzerland's sailing lineup for the Games on June 24, 2016, after the nation received a spare Olympic berth freed up by Canada from the International Sailing Federation.

Men

Athlete	Event	Race													Net points	Final rank
Athlete	Event	1	2	3	4	5	6	7	8	9	10	11	12	M*	Net points	Final rank
Mateo Sanz Lanz	RS:X	~~24~~	15	21	8	14	8	20	11	11	19	4	5	EL	136	14
Yannick Brauchli; Romuald Hausser	470	11	4	19	7	10	10	8	~~22~~	15	8	—N/a		2	94	9
Lucien Cujean; Sébastien Schneiter	49er	5	16	12	4	~~17~~	15	15	10	16	5	17	5	EL	120	13

Women

Athlete	Event	Race											Net points	Final rank
Athlete	Event	1	2	3	4	5	6	7	8	9	10	M*	Net points	Final rank
Linda Fahrni; Maja Siegenthaler	470	18	15	15	12	9	10	8	11	16	~~19~~	EL	104	14

Mixed

Athlete	Event	Race													Net points	Final rank
Athlete	Event	1	2	3	4	5	6	7	8	9	10	11	12	M*	Net points	Final rank
Matías Bühler; Nathalie Brugger	Nacra 17	1	6	6	~~19~~	11	18	10	7	5	5	1	10	20	100	7

M = Medal race; EL = Eliminated – did not advance into the medal race

== Shooting ==
Swiss shooters have achieved quota places for the following events by virtue of their best finishes at the 2015 ISSF World Cup series, and European Championships or Games, as long as they obtained a minimum qualifying score (MQS) by March 31, 2016.

The Swiss Olympic Association announced the shooting team, highlighted by London 2012 Olympian and European Games pistol champion Heidi Diethelm Gerber, on June 2, 2016. With a double starter (owned by Nina Christen) securing quota places in two women's rifle events, the Swiss team decided to exchange one of them with the men's 50 m rifle three positions instead based on performances throughout the qualifying period. The slot was awarded to 2010 Youth Olympian Jan Lochbichler.

Athlete	Event	Qualification		Semifinal		Final	
Athlete	Event	Points	Rank	Points	Rank	Points	Rank
Jan Lochbichler	Men's 50 m rifle prone	623.0	14	—N/a		Did not advance	
Jan Lochbichler	Men's 50 m rifle 3 positions	1166	30	—N/a		Did not advance	
Nina Christen	Women's 10 m air rifle	414.7	16	—N/a		Did not advance	
Nina Christen	Women's 50 m rifle 3 positions	586	2 Q	—N/a		414.8	6
Heidi Diethelm Gerber	Women's 10 m air pistol	376	35	—N/a		Did not advance	
Heidi Diethelm Gerber	Women's 25 m pistol	582	7 Q	18	4 q	8	3rd place, bronze medalist(s)
Sarah Hornung	Women's 10 m air rifle	414.3	21	—N/a		Did not advance	

Qualification Legend: Q = Qualify for the next round; q = Qualify for the bronze medal (shotgun)

== Swimming ==
Swiss swimmers have so far achieved qualifying standards in the following events (up to a maximum of 2 swimmers in each event at the Olympic Qualifying Time (OQT), and potentially 1 at the Olympic Selection Time (OST)):

Jérémy Desplanches, Sasha Touretski, and London 2012 Olympian Yannick Käser were selected to the Swiss swimming team with a FINA Olympic A-cut on March 31, 2016. Käser's fellow Olympian Martina van Berkel, individual medley swimmer Maria Ugolkova, and Alexandre Haldemann, who was invited by FINA to compete in the men's 200 m freestyle as the fastest entrant outside of Olympic qualifying time, joined the roster on July 11, 2016. Butterfly stalwart Danielle Villars and relay swimmer Noémi Girardet rounded out the swimming lineup on July 15.

Men

Athlete	Event	Heat		Semifinal		Final	
Athlete	Event	Time	Rank	Time	Rank	Time	Rank
Jérémy Desplanches	200 m individual medley	1:59.67	=12 Q	2:00.38	13	Did not advance	
Jérémy Desplanches	400 m individual medley	4:15.46 NR	13	—N/a		Did not advance	
Alexandre Haldemann	200 m freestyle	1:49.94	38	Did not advance			
Yannick Käser	100 m breaststroke	1:00.71	=24	Did not advance			
Yannick Käser	200 m breaststroke	2:11.77	20	Did not advance			

Women

Athlete	Event	Heat		Semifinal		Final	
Athlete	Event	Time	Rank	Time	Rank	Time	Rank
Alexandra Touretski	50 m freestyle	25.66	41	Did not advance			
Maria Ugolkova	100 m freestyle	54.85	23	Did not advance			
Maria Ugolkova	200 m individual medley	2:13.77	19	Did not advance			
Martina van Berkel	200 m backstroke	2:13.46	24	Did not advance			
Martina van Berkel	200 m butterfly	2:08.00 NR	11 Q	2:07.90 NR	12	Did not advance	
Martina van Berkel	400 m individual medley	4:45.12	24	—N/a		Did not advance	
Danielle Villars	100 m butterfly	59.45	=27	Did not advance			
Noémi Girardet; Alexandra Touretski; Maria Ugolkova; Danielle Villars	4 × 100 m freestyle relay	3:41.02 NR	14	—N/a		Did not advance	

== Synchronized swimming ==
Switzerland has fielded a squad of two synchronized swimmers to compete only in the women's duet by virtue of their eighth-place finish at the FINA Olympic test event in Rio de Janeiro.

Athlete	Event	Technical routine		Free routine (preliminary)			Free routine (final)		
Athlete	Event	Points	Rank	Points	Total (technical + free)	Rank	Points	Total (technical + free)	Rank
Sophie Giger; Sascia Kraus	Duet	83.3366	13	83.5667	166.9033	14	Did not advance		

== Tennis ==
Switzerland has entered two women tennis players into the Olympic tournament. Double Olympic medalist and four-time Olympian Roger Federer (world no. 2) and his doubles partner Stan Wawrinka (world no. 5) qualified directly for the men's singles as two of the top 56 eligible players in the ATP World Rankings, while Timea Bacsinszky (world no. 10) and Belinda Bencic (world no. 8) did so for the women's singles based on their WTA World Rankings as of 6 June 2016.

Having been directly entered to the singles, Bacsinszky also opted to compete in the women's doubles, along with her rookie partner Viktorija Golubic (as the latter would be on her first Olympic appearance), while Bencic paired up with returning Olympian Martina Hingis from her 20-year absence in the same tournament by virtue of the latter's top-10 WTA ranking.

On July 26, 2016, Federer withdrew from the Games due to his knee injury problems sustained from the Madrid Open, leaving Wawrinka as the lone male player. The following day, Bencic joined him as one of the tennis players to be pulled out from the Games, citing a wrist injury sustained from the Wimbledon Championships. Therefore, Bacsinszky replaced Bencic in the women's doubles with Hingis, and her partnering with Golubic was undone. Wawrinka was the last player to withdraw from the Games due to a back injury, leaving Switzerland with only females in the tennis team for the first time.

Athlete	Event	Round of 64	Round of 32	Round of 16	Quarterfinals	Semifinals	Final / BM	
Athlete	Event	Opposition Score	Opposition Score	Opposition Score	Opposition Score	Opposition Score	Opposition Score	Rank
Timea Bacsinszky	Women's singles	Zhang S (CHN); L 7–6^{(7–4)}, 4–6, 6–7^{(7–9)}	Did not advance					
Timea Bacsinszky; Martina Hingis	Women's doubles	—N/a	Gavrilova / Stosur (AUS); W 6–4, 4–6, 6–2	Mattek-Sands / Vandeweghe (USA); W 6–4, 6–4	Chan H-c / Chan Y-j (TPE); W 6–3, 6–0	Hlaváčková / Hradecká (CZE); W 5–7, 7–6^{(7–3)}, 6–2	Makarova / Vesnina (RUS); L 4–6, 4–6	2nd place, silver medalist(s)

== Triathlon ==
Switzerland has qualified a total of four triathletes for the following events at the Olympics. London 2012 champion Nicola Spirig had her sights set to an Olympic title defense in the women's triathlon with a gold medal triumph at the 2015 European Games. Meanwhile, three-time Olympian Sven Riederer, Andrea Salvisberg, and Jolanda Annen were ranked among the top 40 eligible triathletes each in the men's and women's event, respectively, based on the ITU Olympic Qualification List as of May 15, 2016.

Athlete	Event	Swim (1.5 km)	Trans 1	Bike (40 km)	Trans 2	Run (10 km)	Total Time	Rank
Sven Riederer	Men's	17:48	0:49	56:03	0:35	33:00	1:48:15	19
Andrea Salvisberg	Men's	17:28	0:26	55:04	0:38	34:00	1:47:56	16
Jolanda Annen	Women's	19:19	0:51	1:01:20	0:40	37:32	1:59:42	14
Nicola Spirig	Women's	19:12	0:54	1:01:22	0:38	34:50	1:56:56	2nd place, silver medalist(s)

== Volleyball ==
=== Beach ===
Two Swiss women's beach volleyball teams qualified directly for the Olympics by virtue of their nation's top 15 placement in the FIVB Olympic Rankings as of June 13, 2016. These places were awarded to rookies Isabelle Forrer and Anouk Vergé-Dépré, as well as London 2012 Olympian Nadine Zumkehr and her rookie partner Joana Heidrich.

Athlete	Event	Preliminary round	Standing	Round of 16	Quarterfinals	Semifinals	Final / BM	
Athlete	Event	Opposition Score	Standing	Opposition Score	Opposition Score	Opposition Score	Opposition Score	Rank
Isabelle Forrer; Anouk Vergé-Dépré	Women's	Pool C Wang F – Yue Y (CHN); L 1 – 2 (22–24, 21–18, 12–15); Artacho – Laird (AUS); W 2 – 1 (19–21, 21–16, 21–19); Ross – Walsh Jennings (USA); L 1 – 2 (13–21, 24–22, 12–15)	3 Q	Ludwig – Walkenhorst (GER); L 0 – 2 (19–21, 10–21)	Did not advance			
Joana Heidrich; Nadine Zumkehr	Women's	Pool E Borger – Büthe (GER); W 2 – 0 (21–12, 21–16); Bansley – Pavan (CAN); L 0 – 2 (18–21, 18–21) van Gestel – van der Vlist (NED); W 2 – 1 (17–21, 21–11, 15–8)	2 Q	Meppelink – van Iersel (NED); W 2 – 0 (19–21, 21–13, 15–10)	Larissa – Talita (BRA); L 1 – 2 (23–21, 25–27, 13–15)	Did not advance		

== See also ==
- Switzerland at the 2016 Summer Paralympics
