= 2014 European Rowing Championships =

International rowing event

- Location: Belgrade, Serbia
- Dates: 30 May – 1 June 2014

The 2014 European Rowing Championships was held in Belgrade, Serbia, between 30 May and 1 June 2014.

== Medal summary ==
=== Men ===
Event	Gold	Time	Silver	Time	Bronze	Time
LM1x	Pedro Fraga (POR)	6:51.72	Marcello Miani (ITA)	6:54.42	Michael Schmid (SUI)	6:56.44
M1x	Ondřej Synek (CZE)	6:54.95	Marcel Hacker (GER)	6:56.12	Mindaugas Griškonis (LTU)	7:00.33
LM2x	France (FRA); Stany Delayre; Jérémie Azou	6:11.80	Germany (GER); Konstantin Steinhübel; Lars Hartig	6:13.22	Norway (NOR); Kristoffer Brun; Are Strandli	6:13.28
LM2−	Switzerland (SUI); Simon Niepmann; Lucas Tramèr	6:29.57	Great Britain (GBR); Sam Scrimgeour; Jonathan Clegg	6:30.32	Netherlands (NED); Tim Weerkamp; Ivo de Graaf	6:30.49
M2x	Lithuania (LTU); Rolandas Maščinskas; Saulius Ritter	6:08.82	Azerbaijan (AZE); Aleksandar Aleksandrov; Boris Yotov	6:09.36	Germany (GER); Hans Gruhne; Stephan Krüger	6:10.09
M2−	Serbia (SRB); Veselin Savić; Dušan Bogičević	6:21.75	Netherlands (NED); Rogier Blink; Mitchel Steenman	6:21.99	Germany (GER); Bastian Bechler; Anton Braun	6:24.71
LM4−	Denmark (DEN); Kasper Winther Jørgensen; Jacob Larsen; Jacob Barsøe; Morten Jørgensen	6:08.81	Great Britain (GBR); Mark Aldred; Peter Chambers; Richard Chambers; Chris Bartley	6:10.97	France (FRA); Augustin Mouterde; Thomas Baroukh; Franck Solforosi; Guillaume Raineau	6:12.81
M4x	Ukraine (UKR); Dmytro Mikhay; Artem Morozov; Oleksandr Nadtoka; Ivan Dovhodko	5:41.92	Great Britain (GBR); Graeme Thomas; Sam Townsend; Charles Cousins; Peter Lambert	5:42.19	Germany (GER); Karl Schulze; Kai Fuhrmann; Philipp Wende; Tim Grohmann	5:42.83
M4−	Great Britain (GBR); Alex Gregory; Moe Sbihi; George Nash; Andrew Triggs Hodge	5:46.86	Greece (GRE); Ioannis Tsilis; Dionisis Angelopoulos; Georgios Tziallas; Ioannis Christou	5:51.02	Italy (ITA); Cesare Gabbia; Paolo Perino; Giovanni Abagnale; Giuseppe Vicino	5:51.72
M8+	Germany (GER); Max Planer; Felix Wimberger; Andreas Kuffner; Eric Johannesen; Richard Schmidt; Malte Jakschik; Maximilian Reinelt; Felix Drahotta; Martin Sauer	5:33.95	Russia (RUS); Anton Zarutskiy; Dmitry Kuznetsov; Artyom Kosov; Georgiy Efremenko; Ivan Balandin; Nikita Morgachyov; Ivan Podshivalov; Aleksandr Kulesh; Pavel Safonkin	5:34.99	Great Britain (GBR); Scott Durant; Oliver Cook; Phil Congdon; Matt Gotrel; Pete Reed; Will Satch; Matthew Tarrant; James Foad; Phelan Hill	5:35.56

=== Women ===
Event	Gold	Time	Silver	Time	Bronze	Time
LW1x	Aikaterini Nikolaidou (GRE)	7:33.12	Marie-Anne Frenken (NED)	7:34.95	Leonie Pless (GER)	7:35.86
W1x	Miroslava Knapková (CZE)	7:42.74	Chantal Achterberg (NED)	7:43.02	Sanita Pušpure (IRL)	7:43.04
LW2x	Italy (ITA); Laura Milani; Elisabetta Sancassani	6:54.85	Germany (GER); Lena Müller; Anja Noske	6:55.56	Great Britain (GBR); Imogen Walsh; Katherine Copeland	6:55.77
W2x	Poland (POL); Magdalena Fularczyk; Natalia Madaj	6:52.15	Lithuania (LTU); Donata Vištartaitė; Milda Valčiukaitė	6:52.59	Netherlands (NED); Nicole Beukers; Inge Janssen	6:56.60
W2−	Great Britain (GBR); Helen Glover; Polly Swann	7:03.62	Romania (ROU); Cristina Grigoraș; Laura Oprea	7:08.52	Netherlands (NED); Aletta Jorritsma; Heleen Boers	7:10.56
W4x	Belarus (BLR); Ekaterina Karsten; Tatsiana Kukhta; Yuliya Bichyk; Katsiaryna Shliupskaya	6:14.64	Germany (GER); Marie-Cathérine Arnold; Julia Lier; Julia Richter; Mareike Adams	6:15.38	Poland (POL); Agnieszka Kobus; Maria Springwald; Joanna Dittmann; Monika Ciaciuch	6:17.81
W8+	Romania (ROU); Roxana Cogianu; Nicoleta Albu; Cristina Ilie; Irina Dorneanu; Mihaela Petrilă; Ioana Crăciun; Adelina Cojocariu; Andreea Boghian; Daniela Druncea	6:16.64	Great Britain (GBR); Rosamund Bradbury; Olivia Carnegie-Brown; Catherine Greves; Donna Etiebet; Jessica Eddie; Zoe Lee; Caragh McMurtry; Louisa Reeve; Zoe de Toledo	6:18.32	Germany (GER); Julia Lepke; Anne Becker; Micaela Schmidt; Alexandra Höffgen; Charlotte Reinhardt; Katrin Reinert; Kerstin Hartmann; Kathrin Marchand; Kathrin Schwensen	6:19.97

=== Medal table ===
Rank	Nation	Gold	Silver	Bronze	Total
1	Great Britain	2	4	2	8
2	Czech Republic	2	0	0	2
3	Germany	1	4	5	10
4	Italy	1	1	1	3
4	Lithuania	1	1	1	3
6	Greece	1	1	0	2
6	Romania	1	1	0	2
8	France	1	0	1	2
8	Poland	1	0	1	2
8	Switzerland	1	0	1	2
11	Belarus	1	0	0	1
11	Denmark	1	0	0	1
11	Portugal	1	0	0	1
11	Serbia	1	0	0	1
11	Ukraine	1	0	0	1
16	Netherlands	0	3	3	6
17	Azerbaijan	0	1	0	1
17	Russia	0	1	0	1
19	Ireland	0	0	1	1
19	Norway	0	0	1	1
Totals (20 entries)		17	17	17	51
