= Thomas Baroukh =

French rower (born 1987)

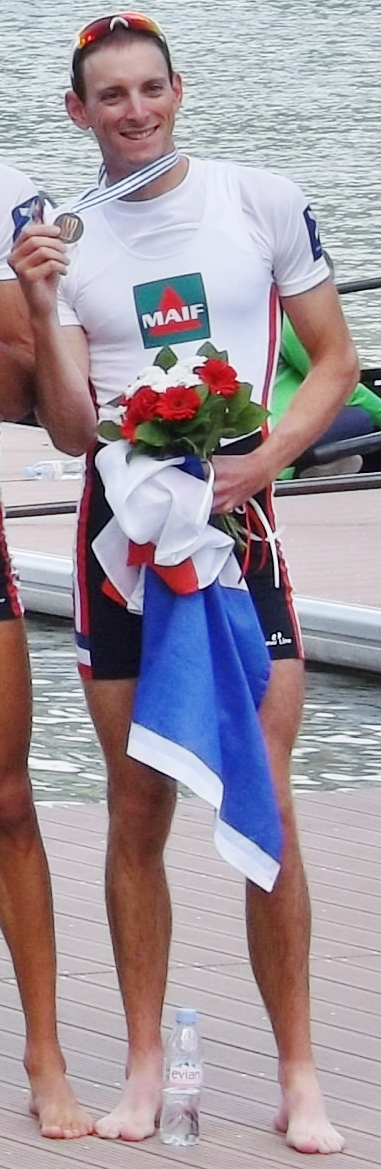

Personal information
- Nationality: French
- Born: 15 December 1987 (age 38) Le Chesnay, France

Sport
- Country: France
- Sport: Rowing
Medal record
Olympic Games
Bronze medal – third place	2016 Rio de Janeiro	LM4−
World Championships
Silver medal – second place	2014 Amsterdam	LM2−
Bronze medal – third place	2015 Aiguebelette	LM4−
European Championships
Silver medal – second place	2015 Poznan	LM4−
Bronze medal – third place	2014 Belgrade	LM4−
Bronze medal – third place	2013 Sevilla	LM4−

Thomas Baroukh (born 15 December 1987) is a French rower. He competed in the Men's lightweight coxless four event at the 2012 Summer Olympics, finishing in 7th. At the 2016 Olympics, he was part of the French lightweight coxless four that won the bronze medal. The same team, consisting of Baroukh, Franck Solforosi, Guillaume Raineau and Thibault Colard, also won the bronze medal at the 2015 World Rowing Championships and bronze at the 2015 European Rowing Championships. Baroukh's previous team, which included Solforosi, Raineau and Augustin Mouterde won the bronze at the 2013 and 2014 European Championships. Baroukh and Mouterde won the silver medal in the men's lightweight pair at the 2014 World Rowing Championships.
