= Jacob Barsøe =

Danish rower (born 1988)

Personal information
- Born: 21 September 1988 (age 37) Vejle, Denmark
Medal record
Men's rowing
Representing Denmark
Olympic Games
Silver medal – second place	2016 Rio de Janeiro	LM4−
Bronze medal – third place	2012 London	LM4−
World Championships
Gold medal – first place	2013 Chungju	LM4−
Gold medal – first place	2014 Amsterdam	LM4−
Silver medal – second place	2015 Aiguebelette	LM4−
European Championships
Gold medal – first place	2013 Seville	LM4−
Gold medal – first place	2014 Belgrade	LM4−
Silver medal – second place	2010 Montemor-o-Velho	LM8+
Bronze medal – third place	2015 Poznań	LM4−

Jacob Jepsen Barsøe (born 21 September 1988) is a Danish rower who won a silver medal at the 2016 Summer Olympics and bronze medal at the 2012 Summer Olympics, both in the men's lightweight sculls.

== Personal life ==
Barsøe was born on 21 September 1988 in Vejle, Syddanmark, Denmark. He studied at the Copenhagen Business School.

== Rowing ==
In 2011, he was selected for the Danish lightweight fours crew alongside 2008 Summer Olympics gold medalists Eskild Ebbesen and Morten Jørgensen, as well as Kasper Winther Jørgensen.

At the 2012 Summer Olympics held in London, United Kingdom, Barsøe represented Denmark in the men's lightweight coxless four event, alongside Ebbesen, Morten Jørgensen and Kasper Winther Jørgensen. In the first round the Danish crew finished third in their heat, behind Switzerland and South Africa, in a time of five minutes 55.64 seconds to qualify for the semifinals. They won their semifinal in a time of six minutes 3.53 seconds to reach the event final. In the final the Danish quartet led after 500 metres but were eventually beaten by both South Africa and Great Britain to finish in third place and win the bronze medal, with under half a second separating the first three boats.

In 2013, he was part of the Danish crew that won the gold medal in the lightweight coxless fours at the 2013 World Rowing Championships at Tangeum Lake, Chungju in South Korea. Barsøe, Morten Jørgensen, Jacob Larsen and Kasper Winther Jørgensen won the gold medal in a time of five minutes 55.68 seconds to finish ahead of silver medalists New Zealand and bronze medalists Great Britain. The same four rowers successfully defended the coxless fours title at the 2014 World Rowing Championships held at Bosbaan, Amsterdam, Netherlands. They set a world record time of five minutes 43.16 seconds in the semifinals before winning the final in a time of five minutes 47.15 seconds to again finish ahead of silver medalists New Zealand and bronze medalists Great Britain. At the 2014 European Championships held in Belgrade, Serbia, the quartet again won a gold medal, finishing ahead of Great Britain and France in the final, with a time of six minutes 8.81 seconds. As a result of their two gold medals and world record time the team were nominated for the 2014 World Rowing Male Crew of the Year award, which was eventually won by New Zealanders Hamish Bond and Eric Murray.

At the 2015 World Rowing Championships held at Lac d'Aiguebelette, Aiguebelette, France, Barsøe teamed up with Larsen, Kasper Winther Jørgensen and Jens Vilhelmsen to win the silver medal in the lightweight coxless fours behind gold medalists Switzerland.

At the 2016 European Rowing Championships held in Brandenburg, Germany, the Danish quartet featuring Jacob Barsøe, Morten Jørgensen, Jacob Søgaard and Kasper Winther Jørgensen were forced to compete in the heavyweight fours rather than their usual lightweight competition as Morten Jørgensen was over the weight requirement after missing the 2015 season due to illness. They finished last in their heat, but then went on to qualify for the final from the repechage and eventually finished sixth overall.

Barsøe, Kasper Winther Jørgensen, Morten Jørgensen and Jacob Søgaard have been selected to compete for Denmark at the 2016 Summer Olympics, being held in Rio de Janeiro, Brazil, in the men's lightweight coxless four event. The team won the silver medal, finishing more than a second behind the winning Swiss team.
