= Rowing at the 2014 Asian Games – Men's lightweight quadruple sculls =

Asian Games competition

Men's lightweight quadruple sculls at the 2014 Asian Games
- Venue: Tangeum Lake
- Date: 21–25 September 2014
- Competitors: 32 from 8 nations

Medalists
gold medal	China; Yu Chenggang, Li Hui, Fan Junjie, Wang Tiexin
silver medal	Hong Kong; Chow Kwong Wing, Tang Chiu Mang, Leung Chun Shek, Kwan Ki Cheong
bronze medal	Indonesia; Ardi Isadi, Tanzil Hadid, Muhad Yakin, Ihram

The men's lightweight quadruple sculls competition at the 2014 Asian Games in Chungju, South Korea was held from 21 September to 25 September at the Tangeum Lake International Rowing Center.

== Schedule ==
All times are Korea Standard Time (UTC+09:00)

Date	Time	Event
Sunday, 21 September 2014	11:00	Heats
Tuesday, 23 September 2014	10:30	Repechage
Thursday, 25 September 2014	10:20	Finals

== Results ==
=== Heats ===
- Qualification: 1 → Final A (FA), 2–4 → Repechage (R)

==== Heat 1 ====
Rank	Team	Time	Notes
1	China (CHN); Yu Chenggang; Li Hui; Fan Junjie; Wang Tiexin	6:07.18	FA
2	Indonesia (INA); Ardi Isadi; Tanzil Hadid; Muhad Yakin; Ihram	6:16.82	R
3	South Korea (KOR); Kim In-won; Kang Tae-yoon; Lee Su-hwoun; Park Tae-hyun	6:16.88	R
4	India (IND); Rakesh Raliya; Vikram Singh; Sonu Laxmi Narain; Shokendar Tomar	6:20.09	R

==== Heat 2 ====
Rank	Team	Time	Notes
1	Hong Kong (HKG); Chow Kwong Wing; Tang Chiu Mang; Leung Chun Shek; Kwan Ki Cheong	6:16.55	FA
2	North Korea (PRK); Kim Hak-myong; Jo Yong-il; Kim Yong-hun; Pak Chol-hun	6:24.60	R
3	Kazakhstan (KAZ); Yevgeniy Tatsey; Ivan Exuzidi; Anastas Shashkov; Artyom Issupov	6:25.66	R
4	Thailand (THA); Sitthakarn Paisanwan; Poonlap Maigerd; Porntawat Inlee; Jaruwat Saensuk	6:26.53	R

=== Repechage ===
- Qualification: 1–4 → Final A (FA), 5–6 → Final B (FB)

Rank	Team	Time	Notes
1	Indonesia (INA); Ardi Isadi; Tanzil Hadid; Muhad Yakin; Ihram	6:13.97	FA
2	India (IND); Rakesh Raliya; Vikram Singh; Sonu Laxmi Narain; Shokendar Tomar	6:15.26	FA
3	South Korea (KOR); Kim In-won; Kang Tae-yoon; Lee Su-hwoun; Park Tae-hyun	6:15.83	FA
4	North Korea (PRK); Kim Hak-myong; Jo Yong-il; Kim Yong-hun; Pak Chol-hun	6:22.31	FB
5	Kazakhstan (KAZ); Yevgeniy Tatsey; Ivan Exuzidi; Anastas Shashkov; Artyom Issupov	6:26.31	FB
6	Thailand (THA); Sitthakarn Paisanwan; Poonlap Maigerd; Porntawat Inlee; Jaruwat Saensuk	6:28.34	FB

=== Finals ===
==== Final B ====
Rank	Team	Time
1	Thailand (THA); Sitthakarn Paisanwan; Poonlap Maigerd; Porntawat Inlee; Jaruwat Saensuk	6:15.82
2	Kazakhstan (KAZ); Yevgeniy Tatsey; Ivan Exuzidi; Anastas Shashkov; Artyom Issupov	6:18.36

==== Final A ====
Rank	Team	Time
1st place, gold medalist(s)	China (CHN); Yu Chenggang; Li Hui; Fan Junjie; Wang Tiexin	6:01.15
2nd place, silver medalist(s)	Hong Kong (HKG); Chow Kwong Wing; Tang Chiu Mang; Leung Chun Shek; Kwan Ki Cheong	6:07.39
3rd place, bronze medalist(s)	Indonesia (INA); Ardi Isadi; Tanzil Hadid; Muhad Yakin; Ihram	6:09.80
4	South Korea (KOR); Kim In-won; Kang Tae-yoon; Lee Su-hwoun; Park Tae-hyun	6:10.35
5	India (IND); Rakesh Raliya; Vikram Singh; Sonu Laxmi Narain; Shokendar Tomar	6:16.05
6	North Korea (PRK); Kim Hak-myong; Jo Yong-il; Kim Yong-hun; Pak Chol-hun	6:19.95
