= Jin Wei =

Chinese rower

Personal information
- Born: 26 February 1987 (age 39)

Sport
- Sport: Rowing

Jin Wei (Chinese: 金威; pinyin: Jīn Wēi; born 26 February 1987) is a Chinese rower. He competed in the men's lightweight coxless four event at the 2016 Summer Olympics.
