= Phil Congdon =

British rower

Personal information
- Born: 6 June 1989 (age 37)
- Home town: Bury St Edmunds

Sport
- Country: Great Britain
- Club: Molesey Boat Club
Medal record
Men's rowing
Representing Great Britain
European Championships
Bronze medal – third place	2014 Belgrade	Men's eight

Philip Congdon (born 6 June 1989) is a British rower.

Congdon competed for Durham University Boat Club and Molesey Boat Club. He won the bronze medal as part of the men's eight at the 2014 European Rowing Championships in Belgrade.
