= Adam Freeman-Pask =

British rower (born 1985)

Personal information
- Nationality: British
- Born: 19 June 1985 (age 41) Berkshire
Medal record
Men's rowing
Representing Great Britain
World Championships
Bronze medal – third place	2013 Chungju	LM4-
European Championships
Silver medal – second place	2012 Varese	LM4-

Adam Freeman-Pask (born 19 June 1985) is a British rower. He is a World Bronze medalist and European Silver medalist. He participated in the 2012 Summer Olympics In London.

== International rowing career ==
Adam won his first International senior vest in 2008 at the World Rowing Championships in Linz, where he raced the Lightweight Men's Single Scull. He raced the same boat class the following season winning Bronze medals through the World Cup season but had unfortunate boat damage at the 2009 World Championships in Poznań, finishing 8th overall. Competing in both sweep and sculling disciplines he found top form in the 2011–2012 season setting a new record in the Wingfield Sculls knocking 17 seconds of the previous record time set by Peter Haining.

He then won the Scullers head, British Senior Trials, and all three World Cups in different disciplines before obtaining selection for Team GB at the London 2012 Games.

While competing for Great Britain he has also won Bronze at the 2013 World Rowing Championships in Chungju, South Korea as part of the lightweight coxless four with Will Fletcher, Jono Clegg and Chris Bartley. and a Silver Medal at the 2012 European Rowing Championships in Varese, Italy.

== Achievements ==
=== Olympics ===
- 2012 London – Lightweight Men's Reserve Athlete

=== World Championships ===
- 2014 Amsterdam – DNS
- 2013 Chungju – Bronze, Lightweight Four (Bow)
- 2011 Bled – 6th, Lightweight Single
- 2010 Karapiro – 6th, Coxless Pair (Bow)
- 2009 Poznań – 8th, Lightweight Single
- 2008 Linz – 13th, Lightweight Single

=== European Championships ===
- 2014 Belgrade 5th, Lightweight Single
- 2012 Varese Silver, Lightweight Four (Two)
- 2007 Poznań 7th, Double Scull (Bow)

=== World Cups ===
- 2013 Eton Dorney – Bronze, Lightweight Four (Bow)
- 2013 Sydney – Gold, Lightweight Double Scull (Bow)
- 2012 Munich – Gold, Lightweight Coxless Pair (Stroke)
- 2012 Lucerne – Gold, Lightweight Single Scull
- 2012 Belgrade – Gold, Lightweight Coxless Pair (Stroke)
- 2010 Bled – Bronze, Lightweight Coxless Pair (Bow)
- 2009 Munich – Bronze, Lightweight Single Scull
- 2009 Banyoles – Bronze, Lightweight Single Scull

=== World under 23 Championships ===
- 2007 Strathclyde – 5th, Lightweight Quad (Three)
- 2006 Hazewinkel – 5th, Lightweight Single

=== GB Rowing Senior Trials ===
- 2013 – 2nd, Lightweight Single
- 2012 – 1st, Lightweight Single
- 2013 – 3rd, Lightweight Single
