= Livio La Padula =

Italian rower

Personal information
- Born: 20 November 1985 (age 40)

Sport
- Sport: Rowing
- Club: G.S. Fiamme Oro

Livio La Padula (born 20 November 1985) is an Italian rower. He competed in the men's lightweight coxless four event at the 2016 Summer Olympics. La Padula is an athlete of the Gruppo Sportivo Fiamme Oro.
