= Bann Rowing Club =

Northern Irish rowing club

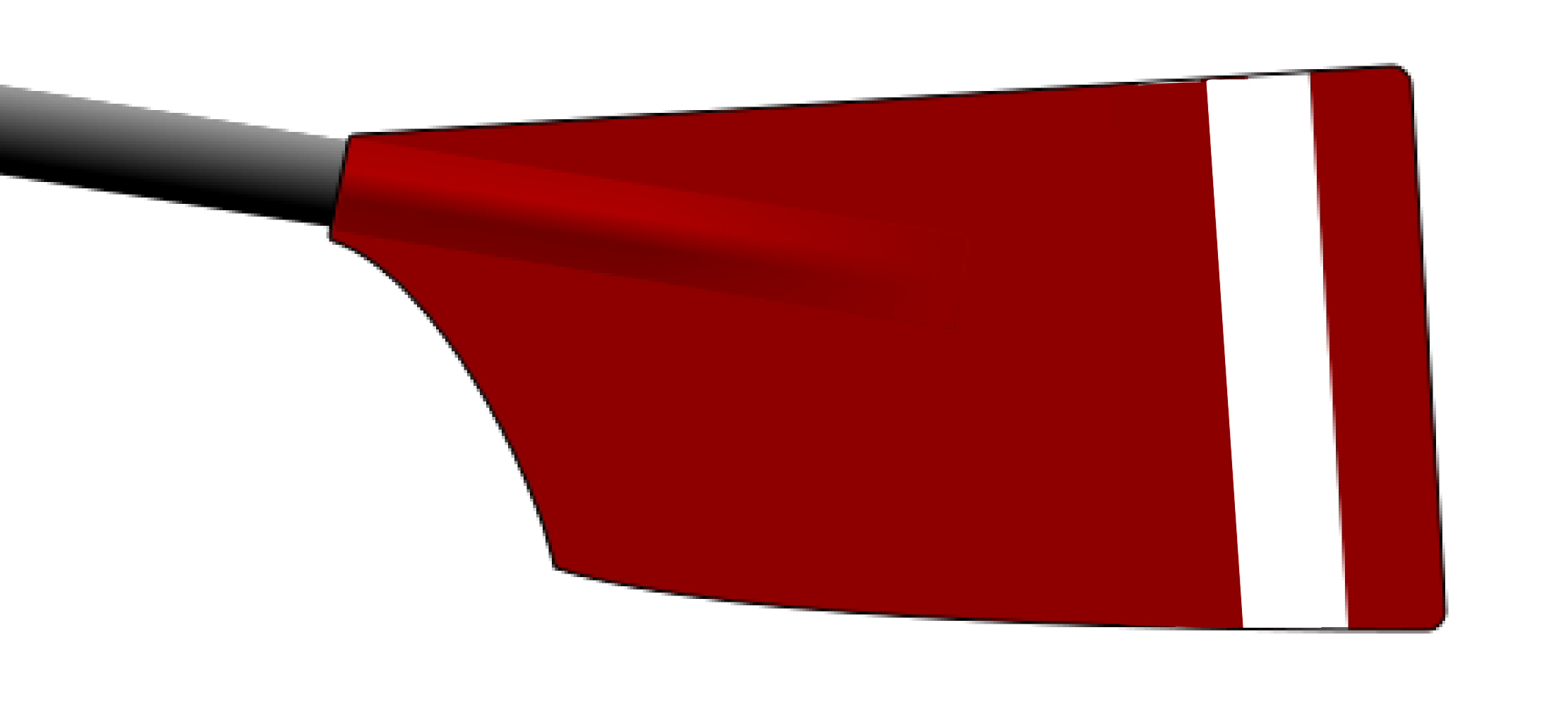
- Location: Hanover Place, Coleraine, Northern Ireland
- Home water: Lower Bann
- Founded: 1842
- Website: www.bannrowingclub.org.uk

Bann Rowing Club is a rowing club in Coleraine, Northern Ireland. It is situated on the east bank of the Lower Bann river in Hanover Place south of the Coleraine Bridge. Founded in 1842, Bann is one of the oldest rowing clubs in all of Ireland.

The present boathouse was constructed in 1900, replacing earlier structures on the site. The club's boathouse is a listed historic building, having been listed in 1977.

The club competes regularly in national regattas across Ireland including the annual National Championships, Cork.

== History ==
On 7 July 1864, the boathouse and nine boats were destroyed by fire causing £300 worth of damage (a considerable sum at the time). The building destroyed was the club's first purpose-built boathouse, erected earlier that year adjoining the ferry slipway at Hanover Place.

A new boathouse was constructed in 1900 to designs by Coleraine town surveyor William James Given, after the foundations of the earlier structure were found to be unsatisfactory. Contemporary accounts reported that the new clubhouse compared favourably with similar rowing buildings elsewhere in the British Isles and contributed to Coleraine’s reputation as a progressive county town.

The boathouse is a late Victorian recreational building, characterised by a brick ground floor with a timber-clad upper storey and prominent gables facing the River Bann, giving it a "distinctive nautical appearance".

The building was listed for its architectural and historic interest in 1977, and underwent refurbishment and extension during the late 20th century, including the addition of a modern extension to the north in the 1990s.

Bann Rowing Club has had success at producing Olympic oarsmen; Alan Campbell won a bronze medal in the men's single scull at the 2012 Summer Olympics. At the same Olympics, Richard Chambers and Peter Chambers both won a silver medal in the lightweight men's four.

== Honours ==
=== Henley Royal Regatta ===
Year	Races won
2018	Hambleden Pairs Challenge Cup

== Notable members ==
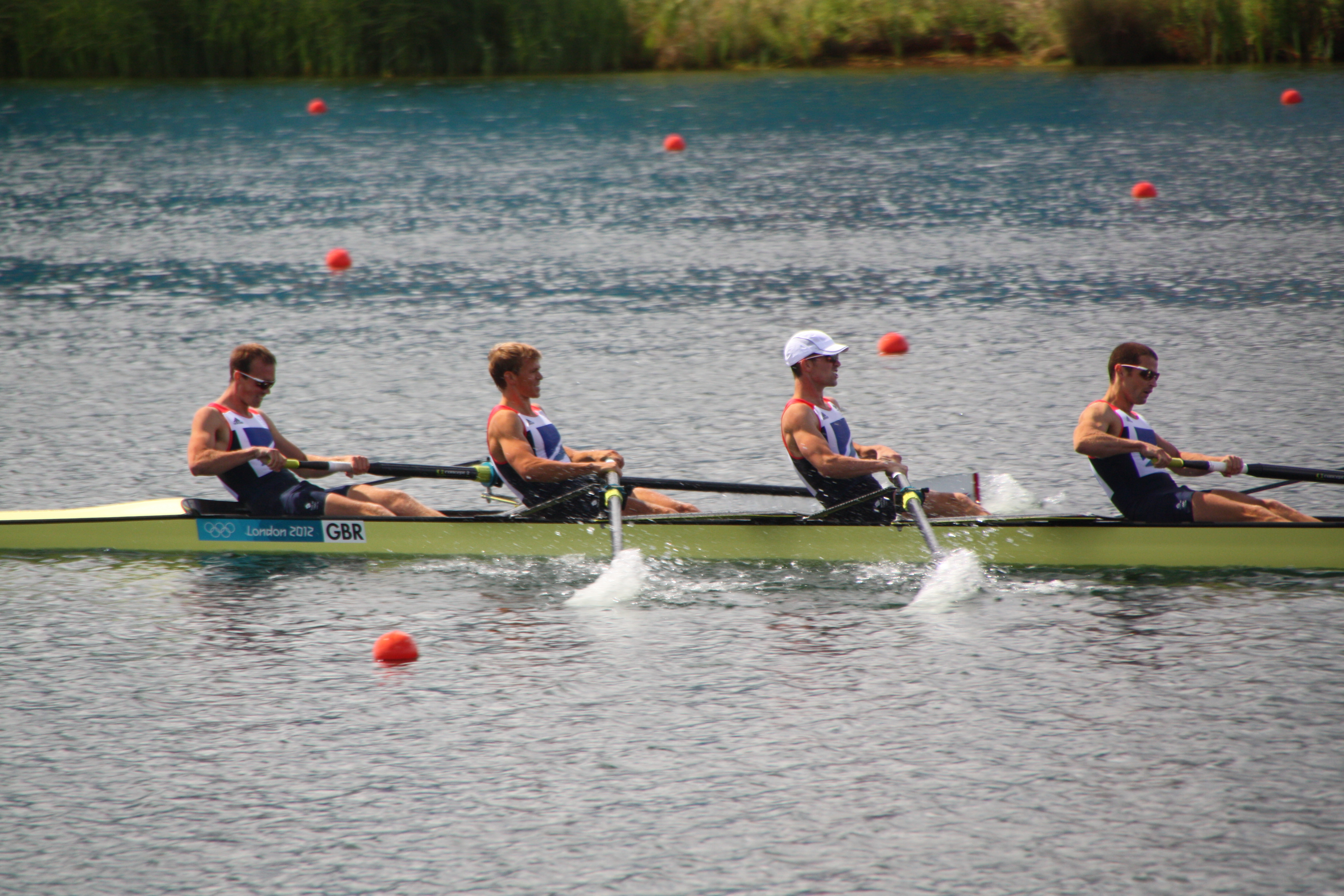
Peter and Richard competing in the London 2012 Olympics

- Alan Campbell
- Joel Cassells
- Peter Chambers
- Richard Chambers
- Hannah Scott
