= Wianka van Dorp =

Dutch rower (born 1987)

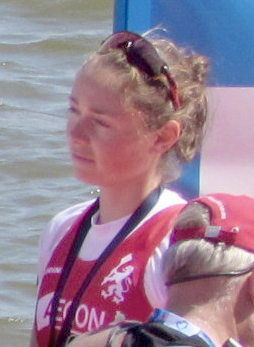
- Van Dorp at the 2016 European Championships

Personal information
- Born: 1 December 1987 (age 38) Vlaardingen, Netherlands
- Height: 177 cm (5 ft 10 in)
- Weight: 72 kg (159 lb)

Sport
- Sport: Rowing
- Club: KR&ZV De Maas
- Coached by: Josy Verdonkschot
Medal record
Women's rowing
Representing the Netherlands
World Championships
| Bronze medal – third place | 2011 Bled | Coxless four |
European Championships
| Silver medal – second place | 2013 Sevilla | Quadruple sculls |
| Silver medal – second place | 2015 Poznań | Eights |
| Silver medal – second place | 2016 Brandenburg | Eights |

Wianka van Dorp (born 1 December 1987) is a Dutch rower. Competing as the bow in different events she won a bronze medal at the 2011 World Championships and three silver medals at the European championships in 2013–2016. She finished sixth in the eight at the 2016 Rio Olympics.

Van dorp took up rowing in 2004. She has degrees in management and the marketing supply chain from Open University in the Netherlands and in management and sports marketing from Rotterdam University of Applied Sciences.
