= Zhao Jingbin =

Chinese rower

Personal information
- Born: 18 April 1990 (age 35); Tongliao, Inner Mongolia, China

Sport
- Sport: Rowing

Zhao Jingbin (simplified Chinese: 赵景滨; traditional Chinese: 趙景濱; pinyin: Zhào Jǐngbīn; born 18 April 1990) is a Chinese rower. He competed in the men's lightweight coxless four event at the 2016 Summer Olympics.
