= Kieren Emery =

British rower

Personal information
- Nationality: British
- Born: 1 June 1990 (age 36) Münster, West Germany
- Height: 6’2
Medal record
Men's rowing
Representing Great Britain
World Rowing Championships
Gold medal – first place	2011 Bled	LM2-

Kieren Emery (born 1 June 1990) is a British rower. He was born in Münster, West Germany.

== Rowing career ==
Emery was part of the British squad that topped the medal table at the 2011 World Rowing Championships in Bled, where he won a gold medal as part of the lightweight coxless pair with Peter Chambers.
