= Mark Aldred =

British rower (born 1987)

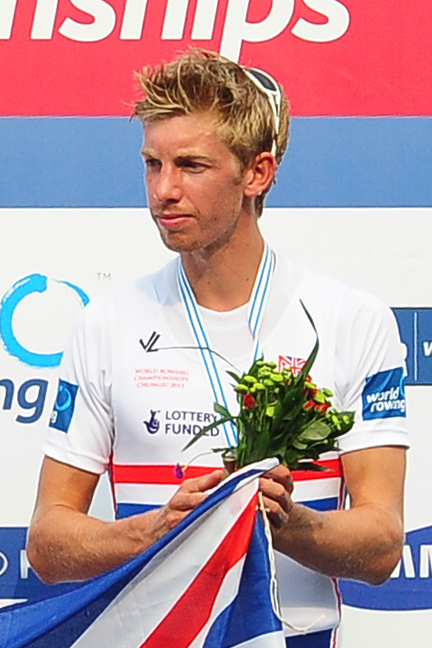
- Mark Aldred at the 2013 World Championships

Personal information
- Nationality: British
- Born: 18 April 1987 (age 39)
- Education: Downing College, Cambridge

Sport
- Country: United Kingdom
- Sport: Men's rowing
- Event: Lightweight coxless four
- Club: London Rowing Club
Medal record
World Championships
| Bronze medal – third place | 2013 Chungju | LM2− |
| Bronze medal – third place | 2014 Amsterdam | LM4− |
European Championships
| Silver medal – second place | 2014 Belgrade | LM4− |
| Silver medal – second place | 2016 Brandenburg | LM4− |

Mark David Aldred (born 18 April 1987) is a British rower who competed at the 2016 Summer Olympics in Rio.

== Personal life ==
Aldred learned to row during his time at Downing College, Cambridge. He then worked as a patent attorney, before joining the British rowing team full-time.

== Rowing career ==
Aldred won bronze at the 2013 World Rowing Championships in Chungju, as part of the lightweight coxless pair with Sam Scrimgeour. The following year he competed at the 2014 World Rowing Championships in Bosbaan, Amsterdam, where he won another bronze medal as part of the lightweight coxless four with Peter Chambers, Richard Chambers and Chris Bartley.

Two years later he was selected for the British Olympic team and competed in the men's lightweight coxless four event with Chris Bartley, Jono Clegg and Peter Chambers, finishing in seventh place.
