= Simon Schürch =

Swiss rower (born 1990)

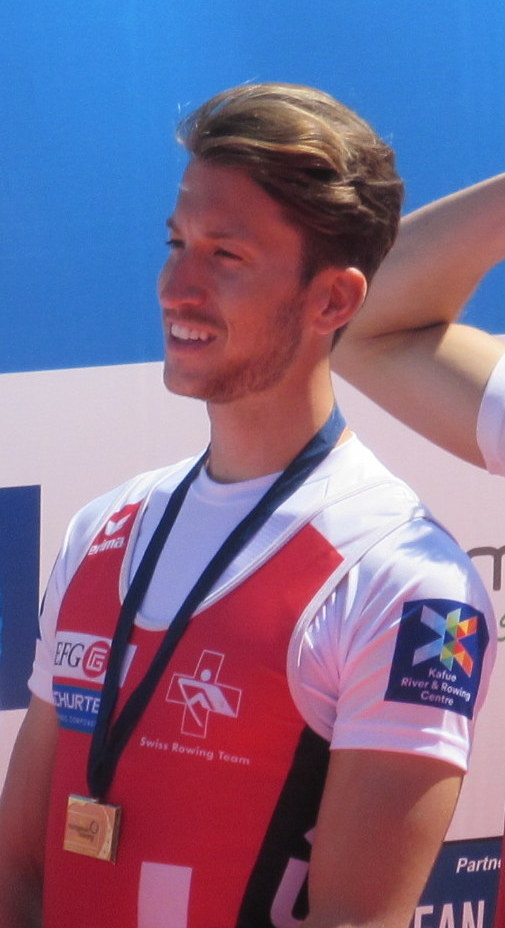
- Schürch in 2016

Personal information
- Nationality: Swiss
- Born: 2 December 1990 (age 35) Rothrist, Switzerland

Sport
- Country: Switzerland
- Sport: Rowing
Medal record
Olympic Games
Gold medal – first place	2016 Rio de Janeiro	LM4−
World Championships
Gold medal – first place	2015 Aiguebelette	LM4−
Silver medal – second place	2013 Chungjiu	LM2x
European Championships
Gold medal – first place	2015 Poznan	LM4-
Gold medal – first place	2016 Brandenburg	LM4-
Bronze medal – third place	2010 Montemor-o-Velho	LM4-
Bronze medal – third place	2013 Seville	LM2x

Simon Schürch (born 2 December 1990) is a Swiss rower. He won gold at the 2016 Rio Olympics in the men's lightweight four, with the team being coached by New Zealander Ian Wright. He also competed in the Men's lightweight coxless four event at the 2012 Summer Olympics.

== Career ==
Schürch was part of the Swiss men's lightweight four that won the bronze medal at the 2010 European Championships, with Lucas Tramer, Simon Niepmann and Mario Gyr. This was the same team that competed at the 2012 Summer Olympics.

Following the Olympics, Schürch and Gyr won silver at the 2013 World and European Championships men's lightweight double sculls.

The Schürch, Gyr, Tramer and Niepmann team then won the men's lightweight coxless four event at the 2015 World and European Championships. In 2016, they retained their European title and won the Olympic title.
