= Joris Pijs =

Dutch rower

Personal information
- Born: 2 April 1987 (age 39) Groningen, Netherlands
- Height: 186 cm (6 ft 1 in)
- Weight: 70 kg (154 lb)

Sport
- Country: Netherlands
- Sport: Rowing

Joris Pijs (born 2 April 1987) is a Dutch rower. He competed in the men's lightweight coxless four event at the 2016 Summer Olympics.
