= Tyler Nase =

American rower

Personal information
- Nationality: American
- Born: August 30, 1990 (age 36)

Sport
- Sport: Rowing

Tyler Nase (born August 30, 1990) is an American rower and former rowing coach. He competed in the men's lightweight coxless four event at the 2016 Summer Olympics. He rowed at La Salle College High School and Princeton University.

Nase served as the John R. Rockwell Assistant Coach of Lightweight Rowing at the University of Pennsylvania from August 2017 through November 2022. He then served as the Henry E. Bartels '48 Head Coach of Lightweight Rowing at Cornell University from December 2022 until his resignation in July 2026. That same month, Nase was named the Head Coach on Penn's Women's Rowing team.
