= Edward King (rower) =

American rower

Personal information
- Born: June 14, 1989 (age 37) Kempton Park

Sport
- Sport: Rowing

Edward King (born June 14, 1989) is an American rower. He competed in the men's lightweight coxless four event at the 2016 Summer Olympics.
