= Rowing at the 2016 Summer Olympics – Men's lightweight coxless four =

Men's lightweight coxless four at the Games of the XXXI Olympiad
- Venue: Rodrigo de Freitas Lagoon
- Date: 6–11 August 2016
- Competitors: 52 from 13 nations
- Teams: 13
- Winning time: 6:20.51

Medalists
1st place, gold medalist(s)		Lucas Tramèr; Simon Schürch; Simon Niepmann; Mario Gyr	Switzerland
2nd place, silver medalist(s)		Jacob Barsøe; Jacob Larsen; Kasper Winther Jørgensen; Morten Jørgensen	Denmark
3rd place, bronze medalist(s)		Franck Solforosi; Thomas Baroukh; Guillaume Raineau; Thibault Colard	France

The men's lightweight coxless four competition at the 2016 Summer Olympics in Rio de Janeiro was held on 6–11 August at the Lagoon Rodrigo de Freitas. This was the last time that this boat class competed, as FISA axed it after the 2017 World Rowing Championships with immediate effect.

== Results ==
=== Heats ===
First three of each heat qualify to the semifinals, remainder goes to the repechage.

==== Heat 1 ====
Rank	Rowers	Country	Time	Notes
1	Stefano Oppo; Martino Goretti; Livio La Padula; Pietro Ruta	Italy	6:03.26	SA/B
2	Jin Wei; Zhao Jingbin; Yu Chenggang; Wang Tiexin	China	6:03.43	SA/B
3	Lucas Tramèr; Simon Schürch; Simon Niepmann; Mario Gyr	Switzerland	6:03.52	SA/B
4	Franck Solforosi; Thomas Baroukh; Guillaume Raineau; Thibault Colard	France	6:07.31	R
5	Jan Vetešník; Ondřej Vetešník; Jiří Kopáč; Miroslav Vraštil Jr.	Czech Republic	6:39.95	R

==== Heat 2 ====
Rank	Rowers	Country	Time	Notes
1	Jacob Barsøe; Jacob Larsen; Kasper Winther Jørgensen; Morten Jørgensen	Denmark	5:58.21	SA/B
2	Chris Bartley; Mark Aldred; Jono Clegg; Peter Chambers	Great Britain	6:01.27	SA/B
3	Spyridon Giannaros; Panagiotis Magdanis; Stefanos Ntouskos; Ioannis Petrou	Greece	6:05.27	SA/B
4	Jonathan Koch; Lars Wichert; Tobias Franzmann; Lucas Schäfer	Germany	6:14.87	R

==== Heat 3 ====
Rank	Rowers	Country	Time	Notes
1	James Lassche; Peter Taylor; Alistair Bond; James Hunter	New Zealand	6:03.34	SA/B
2	Robin Prendes; Anthony Fahden; Edward King; Tyler Nase	United States	6:05.61	SA/B
3	Joris Pijs; Tim Heijbrock; Jort van Gennep; Björn van den Ende	Netherlands	6:07.88	SA/B
4	Maxwell Lattimer; Brendan Hodge; Nicolas Pratt; Eric Woelfl	Canada	6:19.44	R

=== Repechage ===
First three of heat qualify to the semifinals.

==== Heat 1 ====
Rank	Rowers	Country	Time	Notes
1	Franck Solforosi; Thomas Baroukh; Guillaume Raineau; Thibault Colard	France	6:01.18	SA/B
2	Jonathan Koch; Lars Wichert; Tobias Franzmann; Lucas Schäfer	Germany	6:03.29	SA/B
3	Jan Vetešník; Ondřej Vetešník; Jiří Kopáč; Miroslav Vraštil Jr.	Czech Republic	6:04.30	SA/B
4	Maxwell Lattimer; Brendan Hodge; Nicolas Pratt; Eric Woelfl	Canada	6:05.35	

=== Semifinals ===
==== Semifinal 1 ====
Rank	Rowers	Country	Time	Notes
1	Stefano Oppo; Martino Goretti; Livio La Padula; Pietro Ruta	Italy	6:06.56	FA
2	Franck Solforosi; Thomas Baroukh; Guillaume Raineau; Thibault Colard	France	6:07.32	FA
3	James Lassche; Peter Taylor; Alistair Bond; James Hunter	New Zealand	6:08.96	FA
4	Chris Bartley; Mark Aldred; Jono Clegg; Peter Chambers	Great Britain	6:10.46	FB
5	Joris Pijs; Tim Heijbrock; Jort van Gennep; Björn van den Ende	Netherlands	6:12.87	FB
6	Jonathan Koch; Lars Wichert; Tobias Franzmann; Lucas Schäfer	Germany	6:18.43	FB

==== Semifinal 2 ====
Rank	Rowers	Country	Time	Notes
1	Lucas Tramèr; Simon Schürch; Simon Niepmann; Mario Gyr	Switzerland	6:17.85	FA
2	Jacob Barsøe; Jacob Larsen; Kasper Winther Jørgensen; Morten Jørgensen	Denmark	6:19.62	FA
3	Spyridon Giannaros; Panagiotis Magdanis; Stefanos Ntouskos; Ioannis Petrou	Greece	6:23.95	FA
4	Robin Prendes; Anthony Fahden; Edward King; Tyler Nase	United States	6:26.82	FB
5	Jin Wei; Zhao Jingbin; Yu Chenggang; Wang Tiexin	China	6:27.27	FB
6	Jan Vetešník; Ondřej Vetešník; Jiří Kopáč; Miroslav Vraštil Jr.	Czech Republic	6:33.43	FB

=== Final ===
==== Final B ====
Rank	Rowers	Country	Time	Notes
1	Chris Bartley; Mark Aldred; Jono Clegg; Peter Chambers	Great Britain	6:31.54	
2	Jin Wei; Zhao Jingbin; Yu Chenggang; Wang Tiexin	China	6:32.78	
3	Jonathan Koch; Lars Wichert; Tobias Franzmann; Lucas Schäfer	Germany	6:35.83	
4	Robin Prendes; Anthony Fahden; Edward King; Tyler Nase	United States	6:36.93	
5	Joris Pijs; Tim Heijbrock; Jort van Gennep; Björn van den Ende	Netherlands	6:37.28	
6	Jan Vetešník; Ondřej Vetešník; Jiří Kopáč; Miroslav Vraštil Jr.	Czech Republic	6:43.52	

==== Final A ====
The medals for the competition were presented by Denis Oswald, Switzerland, member of the International Olympic Committee, and the gifts were presented by Matt Smith, United States of America, executive director of the International Rowing Federation.

Rank	Rowers	Country	Time	Notes
1st place, gold medalist(s)	Lucas Tramèr; Simon Schürch; Simon Niepmann; Mario Gyr	Switzerland	6:20.51	
2nd place, silver medalist(s)	Jacob Barsøe; Jacob Larsen; Kasper Winther Jørgensen; Morten Jørgensen	Denmark	6:21.97	
3rd place, bronze medalist(s)	Franck Solforosi; Thomas Baroukh; Guillaume Raineau; Thibault Colard	France	6:22.85	
4	Stefano Oppo; Martino Goretti; Livio La Padula; Pietro Ruta	Italy	6:25.52	
5	James Lassche; Peter Taylor; Alistair Bond; James Hunter	New Zealand	6:28.14	
6	Spyridon Giannaros; Panagiotis Magdanis; Stefanos Ntouskos; Ioannis Petrou	Greece	6:36.47	

== Aftermath ==
This was the last time the Danish Gold Four competed, as they did not nominate their boat for the 2017 World Rowing Championships.

To achieve gender equality in rowing, FISA suggested early in 2017 to drop the lightweight men's four from the Olympic programme, and the recommendation was adopted by the executive board of the International Olympic Committee in June 2017. Shortly after the 2017 championships, the FISA council voted to remove the lightweight men's four from the world championships with immediate effect.
