= Peter Chambers (rower) =

British rower (born 1990)

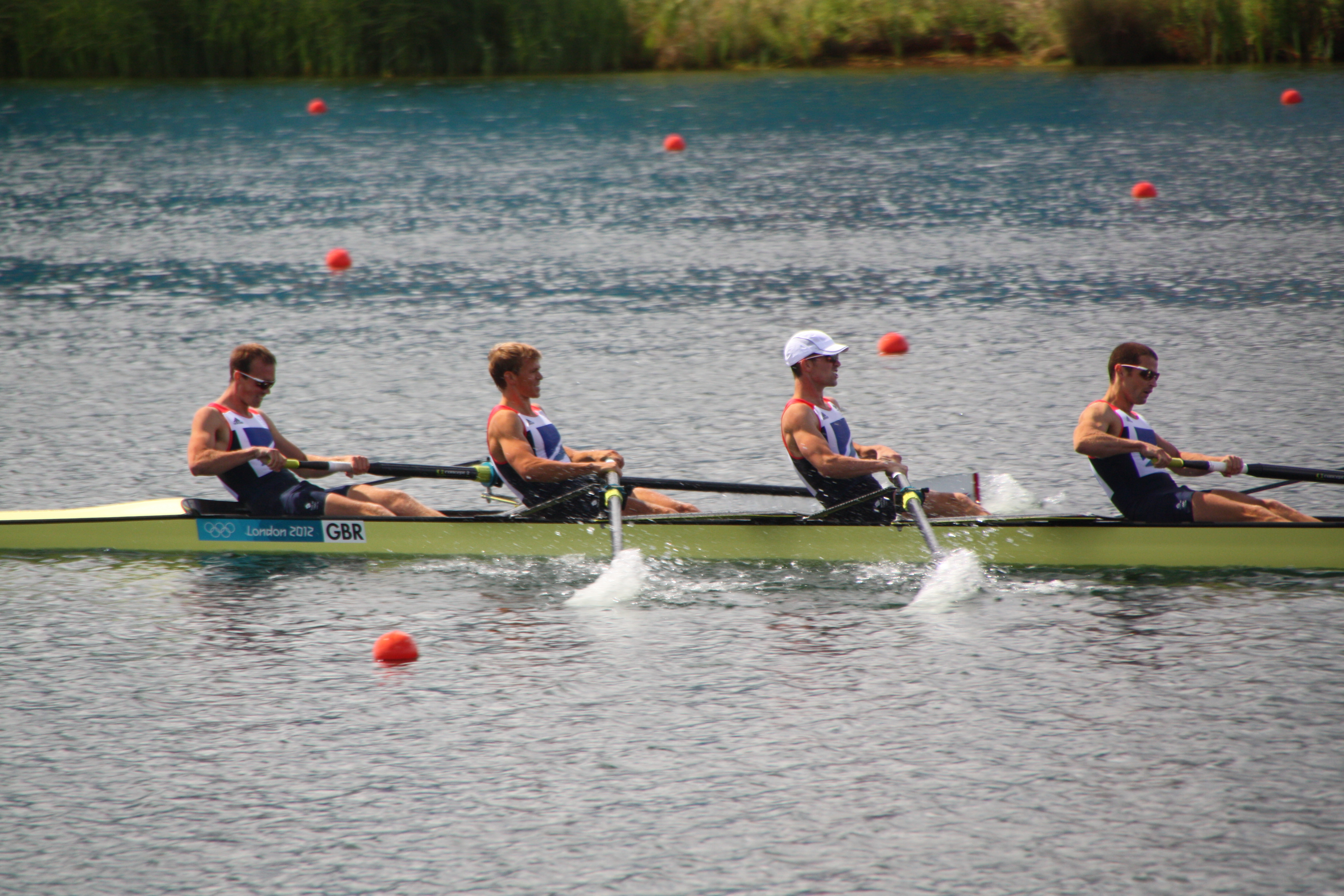
- Peter Chambers (left) competing in the LM4- at the 2012 Summer Olympics

Personal information
- Born: 14 March 1990 (age 36) Ballymoney, County Antrim, Northern Ireland
- Education: Oxford Brookes University
Medal record
Men's rowing
Representing Great Britain
Olympic Games
Silver medal – second place	2012 London	LM4−
World Championships
Gold medal – first place	2011 Bled	LM2−
Bronze medal – third place	2013 Chungjiu	LM2x
Bronze medal – third place	2014 Amsterdam	LM4−
Silver medal – second place	2017 Sarasota	LM4x
European Championships
Gold medal – first place	2015 Poznan	LM2−
Silver medal – second place	2014 Belgrade	LM4−
Silver medal – second place	2016 Brandenburg	LM4−

Peter Chambers (born 14 March 1990) is a British rower, and is the brother of fellow rower Richard Chambers. He is a World Champion in the men's lightweight double sculls and an Olympic silver medalist in the men's lightweight coxless four.

== Career ==
Peter began rowing in Coleraine, Northern Ireland for Bann Rowing Club.

His first international medal came in 2009, when he and won the bronze medal in the men's lightweight quadruple sculls at the Under-23 World Championships. In 2010, he won the silver medal in the men's lightweight single sculls at the Under-23 World Championship. in 2011, he finally stood on the top step of an Under-23 World Championship podium, winning the men's lightweight double sculls with Kieren Emery.

That year, Chambers and Emery also won the senior men's lightweight double sculls World Championship.

At the 2012 Summer Olympics in London he was part of the British crew that won the silver medal in the lightweight men's four, alongside his brother Richard, Rob Williams and Chris Bartley.

At the 2013 World Championship, he won bronze with his brother in the men's lightweight double sculls.

In 2014, Chambers won silver at the European Championship and bronze at the World Championship in the men's lightweight four.

He was the 2015 European Champion in the lightweight men's pair, along with Joel Cassells, who also started his rowing career at Bann Rowing Club.

In 2016, he won European silver in the men's lightweight four, and was selected for the British Olympic team competing in the men's lightweight coxless four event with Chris Bartley, Mark Aldred and Jono Clegg, finishing in seventh place.

In 2017 at the 2017 World Rowing Championships he won a silver in the lightweight quadruple sculls.
