= Richard Chambers (rower) =

British rower (born 1985)

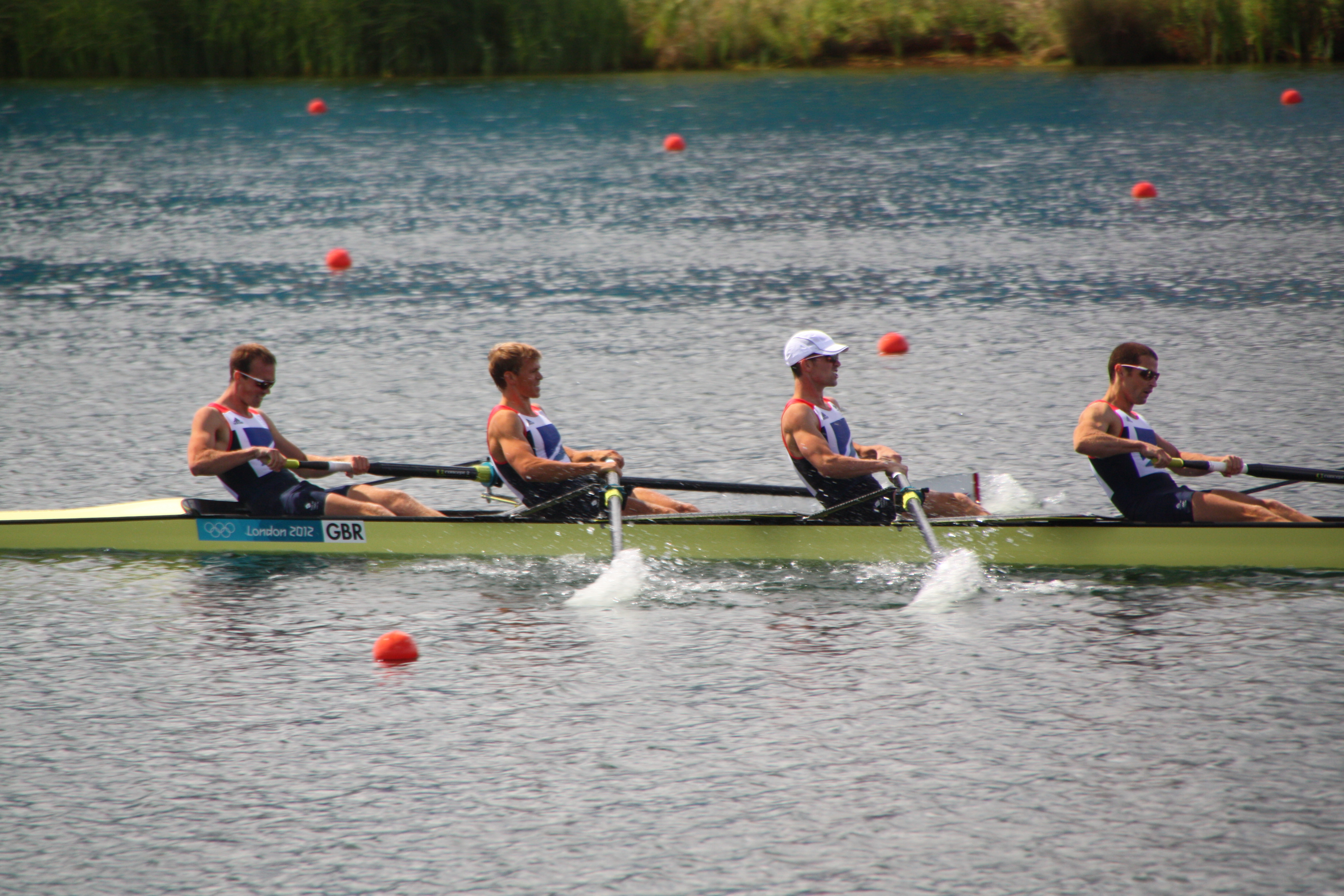
- British lightweight coxless four (Richard Chambers, 2nd from right) at the 2012 Summer Olympics

Personal information
- Full name: Richard Scott Chambers
- Nationality: British
- Born: 10 June 1985 (age 41) Coleraine, County Londonderry, Northern Ireland
- Education: Oxford Brookes University
- Height: 1.83 m (6 ft 0 in)
- Weight: 70 kg (154 lb)

Sport
- Sport: Rowing
- Event: Lightweight
- Club: Leander Club
Medal record
Men's rowing
Representing Great Britain
Olympic Games
Silver medal – second place	2012 London	LM4-
World Championships
Gold medal – first place	2007 Munich	LM4-
Gold medal – first place	2010 Karapiro	LM4-
Silver medal – second place	2015 Aiguebelette	LM2x
Bronze medal – third place	2011 Lake Bled	LM4-
Bronze medal – third place	2013 Chungjiu	LM2x
Bronze medal – third place	2014 Amsterdam	LM4−
European Championships
Silver medal – second place	2014 Belgrade	LM4−
Silver medal – second place	2015 Poznan	LM2x

Richard Scott Chambers (born 10 June 1985) is a British rower, and is the brother of fellow rower Peter Chambers. At the 2012 Summer Olympics in London he was part of the British crew that won the silver medal in the lightweight men's four.

== Biography ==
Richard began rowing at the age of 14, at Coleraine Academical Institution, under the coaching of Bobby Platt. He later left Coleraine Inst and joined Bann Rowing Club Coleraine at the age of 16, and went on to represent Ireland in the junior pair at the 2003 Home Internationals in Cork with Stephen Feeney, under the coaching of Simon Hamilton (Bann Rowing Club).

He attended Oxford Brookes University reading Construction Management and rowed for the university boat club, coached by Peter Haining and Richard Spratley. It was there that he progressed into the Great Britain Rowing team.

In 2005, Richard attended the World Under-23 Rowing Championships held in Amsterdam, where he took silver in the Lightweight Men's Quadruple Scull. The following year he won a gold medal and a world best-time in the under-23 Lightweight Men's Pair event with Chris Bartley at Hazewinkel (Belgium). He attended his first senior World Rowing Championships later on that summer (held at Dorney Lake) in the Lightweight Men's Pair.

In 2007 he rowed in the lightweight men's four, alongside James Clarke, Paul Mattick and James Lindsay-Fynn. Together they won the 2007 Rowing World Cup Series, and went on to take the gold medal at the World Rowing Championships in Munich-Oberschleissheim. The following year the same quartet represented Great Britain at the 2008 Beijing Olympic Games, where they finished in fifth place.

At the 2010 World Rowing Championships at Lake Karapiro, New Zealand, he won the gold medal in the lightweight men's four, together with Paul Mattick, Rob Williams and Chris Bartley. He was part of the British squad that topped the medal table at the 2011 World Rowing Championships in Bled, where he won a bronze medal as part of the lightweight coxless four with Chris Bartley, Paul Mattick and Rob Williams. He competed at the 2013 World Rowing Championships in Chungju, where he won a bronze medal as part of the lightweight double sculls with his brother Peter.

He competed at the 2014 World Rowing Championships in Bosbaan, Amsterdam, where he won a bronze medal as part of the lightweight coxless four with Mark Aldred, Chris Bartley and his brother Richard.

He was part of the British team that topped the medal table at the 2015 World Rowing Championships at Lac d'Aiguebelette in France, where he won a silver medal as part of the lightweight double scull with Will Fletcher.
