= Vyacheslav Mikhaylevsky =

Russian rower

Personal information
- Born: 6 May 1991 (age 35) Krasnodar, Russia
Medal record
Men's rowing
Representing Russia
European Championships
Gold medal – first place	2015 Poznan	M4x

Vyacheslav Viktorovich Mikhaylevsky (Russian: Вячеслав Викторович Михайлевский, born 6 May 1991) is a Russian rower. He won the gold medal in the quadruple sculls at the 2015 European Rowing Championships.
