= Jort van Gennep =

Dutch rower

Personal information
- Born: 6 August 1994 (age 31)

Sport
- Sport: Rowing

Jort van Gennep (born 6 August 1994) is a Dutch rower. He competed in the men's lightweight coxless four event at the 2016 Summer Olympics.
