= Lucas Tramèr =

Swiss rower (born 1989)

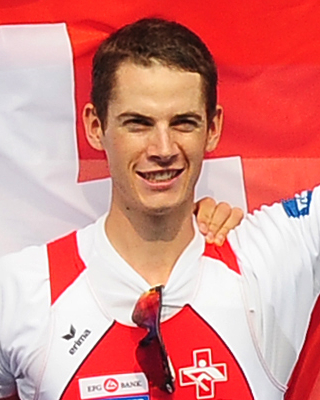
- Lucas Tramèr winning gold at the World Championships in 2013

Personal information
- Nationality: Swiss
- Born: 1 September 1989 (age 36) Interlaken, Switzerland

Sport
- Country: Switzerland
- Sport: Rowing
Medal record
Olympic Games
Gold medal – first place	2016 Rio de Janeiro	LM4−
World Championships
Gold medal – first place	2013 Chungju	LM2−
Gold medal – first place	2014 Amsterdam	LM2−
Gold medal – first place	2015 Aiguebelette	LM4−
European Championships
Gold medal – first place	2013 Sevilla	LM2-
Gold medal – first place	2014 Belgrade	LM2−
Gold medal – first place	2015 Poznań	LM4-
Gold medal – first place	2016 Brandenburg	LM4-
Bronze medal – third place	2010 Monte-o-velho	LM4-

Lucas Tramèr (born 1 September 1989) is a Swiss rower. He won gold at the 2016 Summer Olympics in the men's lightweight four, with Simon Schürch, Simon Niepmann and Mario Gyr. The team was coached by New Zealander Ian Wright. Tramèr has also won a number of gold medals at the World Rowing Championships. He also competed in the Men's lightweight coxless four event at the 2012 Summer Olympics.

== Career ==
The team of Tramèr, Simon Schürch, Simon Niepmann and Mario Gyr finished in 3rd in the men's lightweight four at the 2010 European Championships, 6th at the 2011 World Championships, and improved to 5th at the 2012 Olympics.

After the 2012 Summer Olympics, Tramèr competed in the lightweight pairs with Simon Niepmann winning the 2013 and 2014 World and European titles. The pair's winning time of 6:22.910 at the 2014 World Championships remains the world's best in 2018.

In 2015, Tramèr won the World and European men's lightweight four titles with Schürch, Niepmann and Gyr.

In 2016, before the Olympics, he won the European lightweight four title with Schürch, Niepmann and Gyr, the same team that later won Olympic gold in Rio. The gold medal in Rio was Switzerland's third ever Olympic gold in rowing, and the first they had won since 1996.
