= Ioannis Petrou =

Greek rower (born 1996)

Personal information
- Nationality: Greek
- Born: 10 August 1996 (age 29) Thessaloniki, Greece
- Height: 186 cm (6 ft 1 in)
- Weight: 73 kg (161 lb)

Sport
- Country: Greece
- Sport: Rowing

Achievements and titles
- Olympic finals: 6th place Olympic Games 2016
- World finals: 2nd and 3rd place (world rowing championships U23, 2015 and 2016)

Ioannis Petrou (born 10 August 1996 in Thessaloniki) is a Greek competitive rower.

He competed at the 2016 Summer Olympics in Rio de Janeiro, in the men's lightweight coxless four, finishing in the 6th place.
