= Chris Bartley (rower) =

British rower (born 1984)

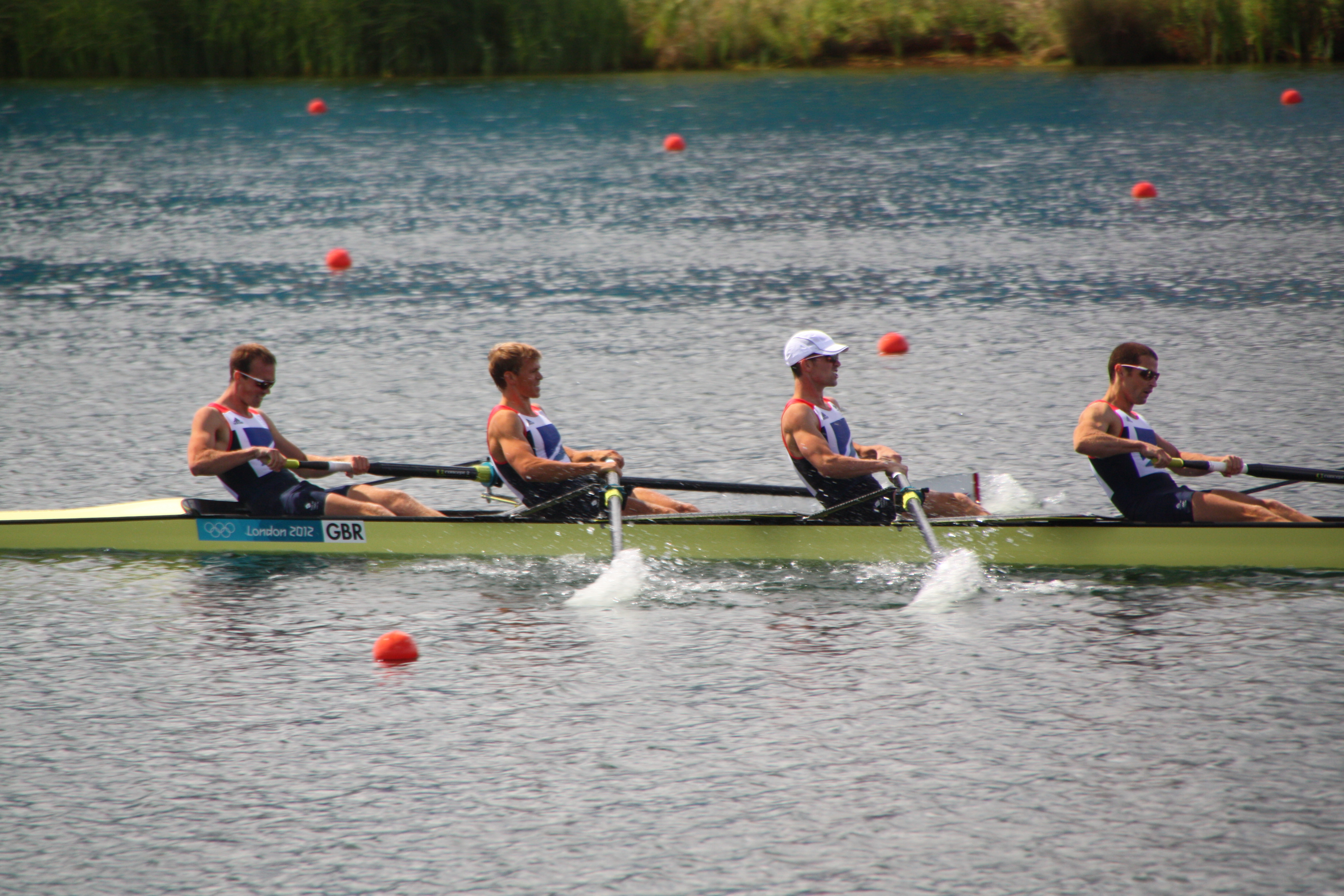
- British lightweight coxless four (including Chris Bartley at Stroke) at the 2012 Summer Olympics

Personal information
- Full name: Christopher Roger Bartley (a.k.a. C-Bart)
- Nationality: British
- Born: 2 February 1984 (age 42) Wrexham, Wales
- Height: 178 cm (5 ft 10 in)

Sport
- Country: Great Britain
- Sport: Men's rowing
- Event: Lightweight Coxless four
- Club: Leander Club
Medal record
Representing Great Britain
Olympic Games
Silver medal – second place	2012 London	LM4-
World Championships
Gold medal – first place	2010 Karapiro	LM4-
Bronze medal – third place	2007 Munich	LM4x
Bronze medal – third place	2011 Lake Bled	LM4-
Bronze medal – third place	2013 Chungju	LM4−
Bronze medal – third place	2014 Amsterdam	LM4−
European Championships
Silver medal – second place	2014 Belgrade	LM4−
Silver medal – second place	2016 Brandenburg	LM4−
U23 World Rowing Championships
Silver medal – second place	2005 Amsterdam	BLM4x

Christopher Roger Bartley (born 2 February 1984) is a British rower who competed at the 2012 Summer Olympics and 2016 Summer Olympics.

== Personal life ==
Bartley was educated at The King's School, Chester, where he was schoolmates with fellow Olympian Tom James, and studied biology at the University of Nottingham.

== Rowing career ==
Bartley was part of the British squad that topped the medal table at the 2011 World Rowing Championships in Bled, where he won a bronze medal as part of the lightweight coxless four with Richard Chambers, Paul Mattick and Rob Williams. He won a silver medal at the 2012 Olympic Games as part of the men's lightweight four, with Peter Chambers, Rob Williams and Richard Chambers.

He competed at the 2013 World Rowing Championships in Chungju, where he won a bronze medal as part of the lightweight coxless four with Adam Freeman-Pask, Will Fletcher and Jono Clegg. The following year he competed at the 2014 World Rowing Championships in Bosbaan, Amsterdam, where he won a bronze medal as part of the lightweight coxless four with Mark Aldred, Peter Chambers and Richard Chambers.

In 2016 he was selected for the British Olympic team and competed in the men's lightweight coxless four event with Jono Clegg, Mark Aldred and Peter Chambers, finishing in seventh place.
