= Lars Wichert =

German rower

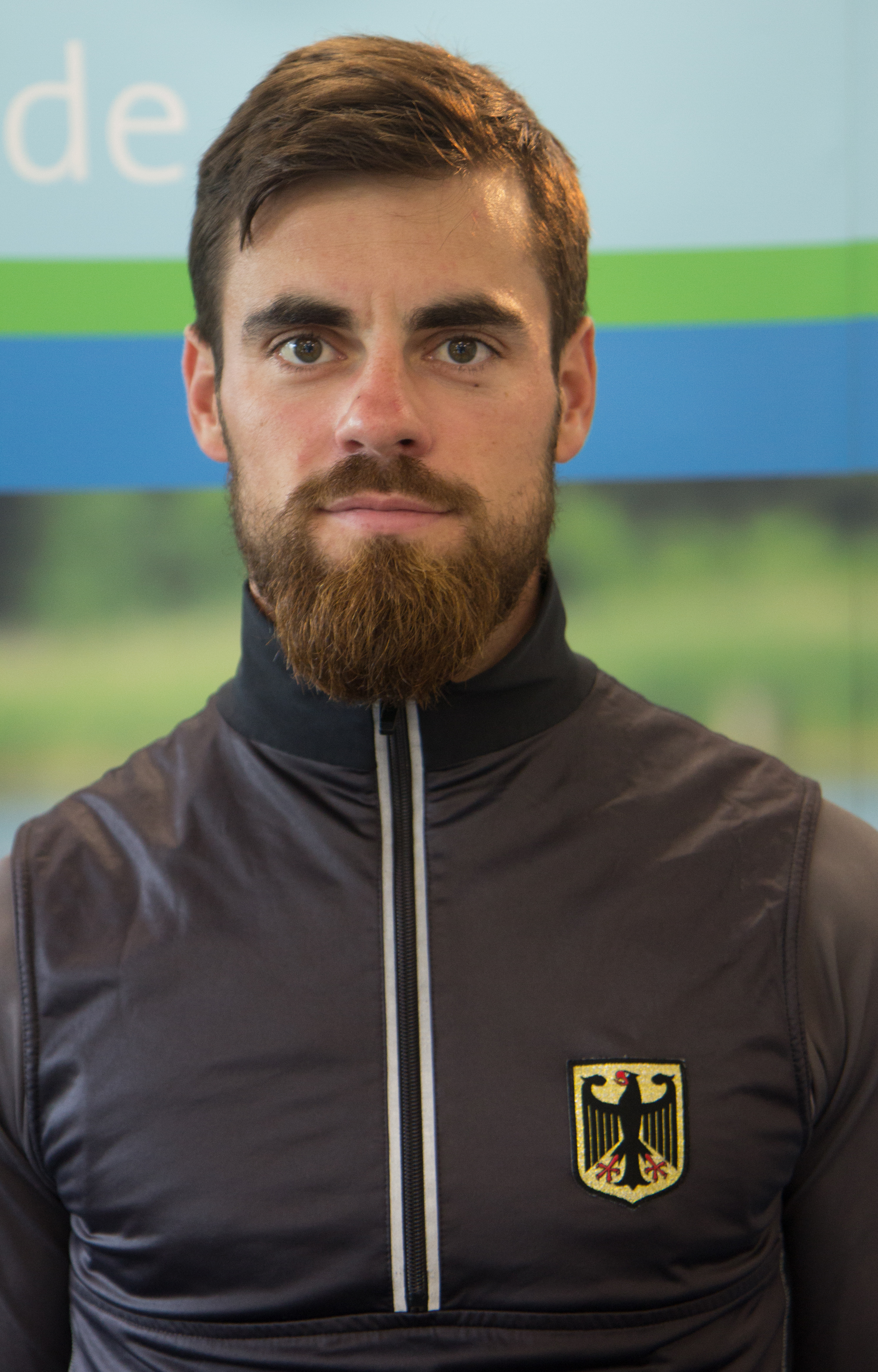

Medal record

Men's rowing

Representing Germany

World Rowing Championships
| Gold medal – first place | 2010 Karapiro | LM8+ |
| Gold medal – first place | 2010 Karapiro | LM4x |
| Gold medal – first place | 2012 Plovdiv | LM8+ |
| Silver medal – second place | 2009 Poznań | LM4x |
| Bronze medal – third place | 2011 Lake Bled | LM2- |

Lars Wichert (born 28 November 1986 in Berlin) is a German rower. At the 2016 Summer Olympics in Rio de Janeiro, he competed in the men's lightweight coxless four. The German team finished in 9th place.

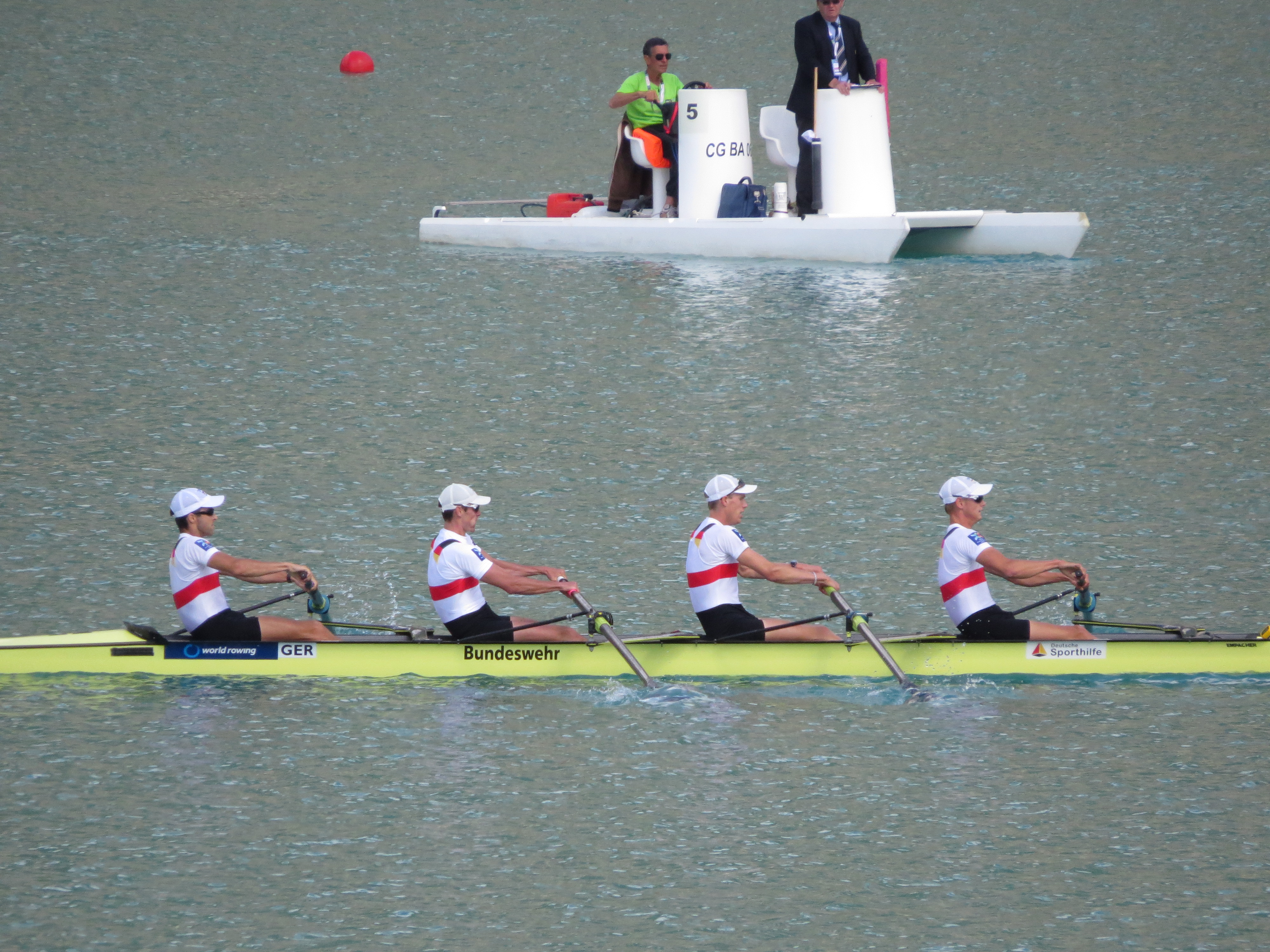
Lars Wichert (seat 2) in 2015
