= Wang Tiexin =

Chinese rower

Personal information
- Born: 24 February 1989 (age 37) Anji, Zhejiang, China

Sport
- Sport: Rowing

Wang Tiexin (born 24 February 1989) is a Chinese rower. He competed in the men's lightweight coxless four event at the 2012 and 2016 Summer Olympics. He won the bronze medal at the 2014 World Rowing Championships in the men's lightweight four with Li Hui, Tian Bin and Dong Tianfeng.
