= Matías Bühler =

Swiss sailor

Matías Bühler (born in Argentina, January 15, 1983) is a Swiss sailor. Challenger for the 37th America’s Cup in Barcelona, sailor in Alinghi Red Bull Racing.

Nathalie Brugger and him placed seventh in the Nacra 17 event at the 2016 Summer Olympics.

== Early Ears ==
He started sailing on the Río de la Plata river in Buenos Aires, when he was 8 years old. From a young age he felt passion for this sport. When he was 14, he became the South American champion and a World vice-champion in the Optimist class. His fleeting passage through the Cadet category was also successful; getting a European vice-championship in 1999, and a third place in the 2000 World championship.

He started his career as a coach in 1999. As the national coach of the Argentinian Optimist team, they won the 2003 and 2005 team racing World championships.

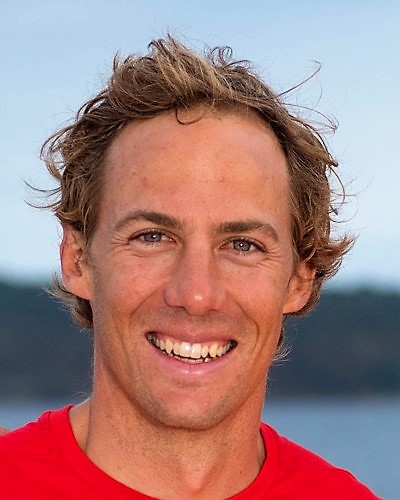

== Olympic Games ==
His first Olympic project was in the 470 class together with Marcos Lamas. They managed to be the South American and Argentinian champions on two occasions. They have racked up top 10s in regattas such as the Princess Sofia Trophy, Kiel Olympic Week, and the ISAF World Sailing Games.

Beijing 2008 was his first successful Olympic Games experience as the coach of the Argentinian tornado Lange-Espinola team, in which they won a bronze medal.

London 2012, in another ambitious Olympic project, He was the coach of Richard Stauffacher, a Swiss windsurfer, who managed to be the best Swiss sailor by finishing in tenth position.

In 2013 he embarked on a new and unforgettable Olympic project, sailing together with Swiss Nathalie Brugger in Nacra 17 class. They obtained podiums in World championships and World Cups, Top 10’s in most of the championships on the international circuit, finishing the Rio 2016 Games with an Olympic diploma.

At the Tokyo 2020 Olympics, he was the coach of the Japanese pair Iitsuka-Hayama: the national Nacra17 team from the host nation.

All these sailing hours, added to four Olympic Games, a score of participations in World championships (top 10 in ten of them), ten in European championships and nine in South America, have allowed him to live experiences and gain important results on the five continents.

== Keelboats ==
His passion for sailing led him to acquire his first weapons on keelboats, developing mostly as a tactician and helmsman. Regattas in South America and Europe forged a special admiration for the complexity of tasks and roles in large teams.
