= Tobias Franzmann =

German rower

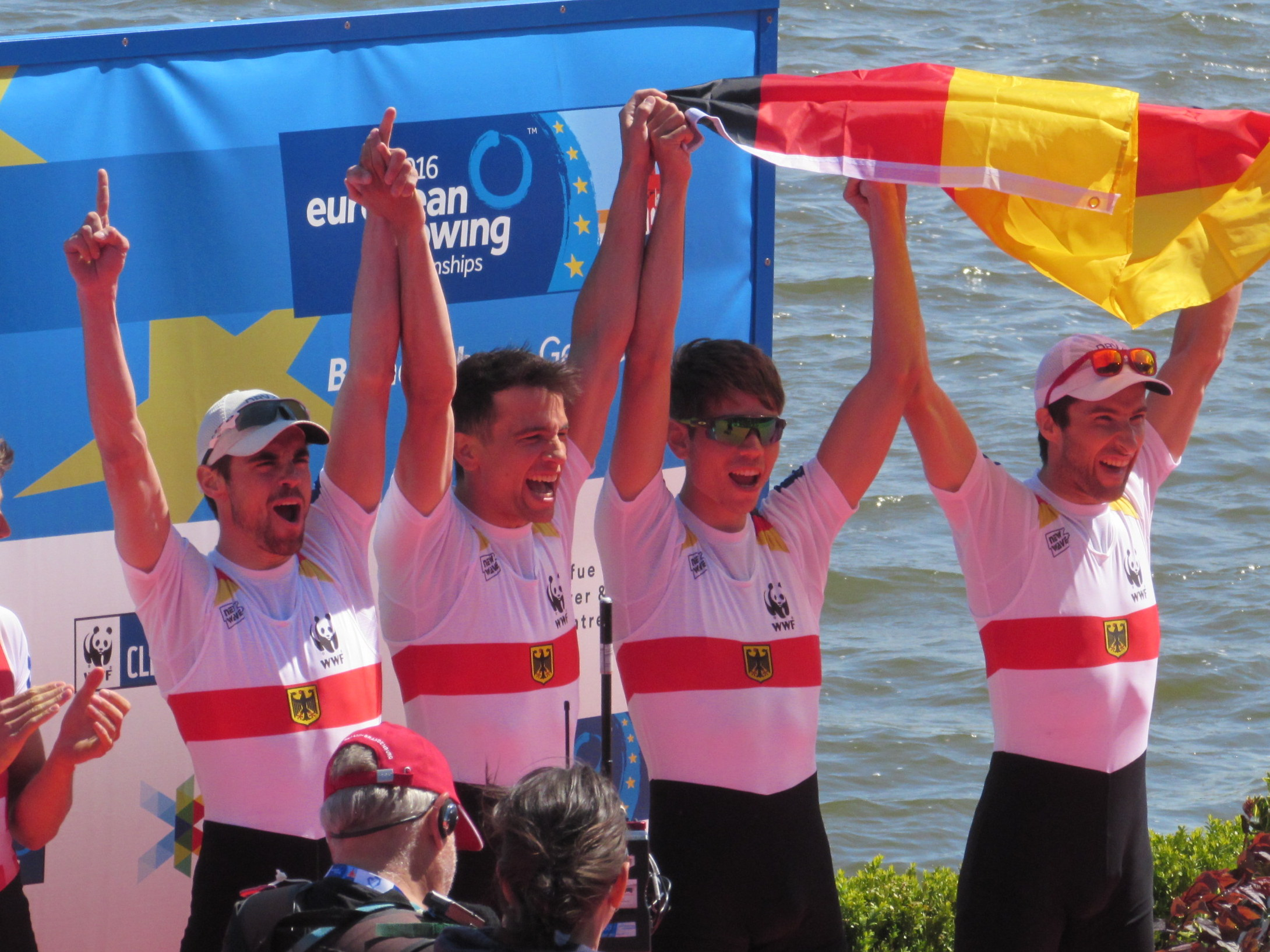
- Franzmann (second from right) in 2016

Personal information
- Nationality: German
- Born: 8 December 1990 (age 35)
- Height: 181 cm (5 ft 11 in)
- Weight: 73 kg (161 lb)

Sport
- Sport: Rowing
Medal record
Men's rowing
Representing Germany
World Championships
Gold medal – first place	2014 Amsterdam	LM8+

Tobias Franzmann (born 8 December 1990) is a German rower. He competed in the men's lightweight coxless four event at the 2016 Summer Olympics.
