= Lucas Schäfer =

German rower

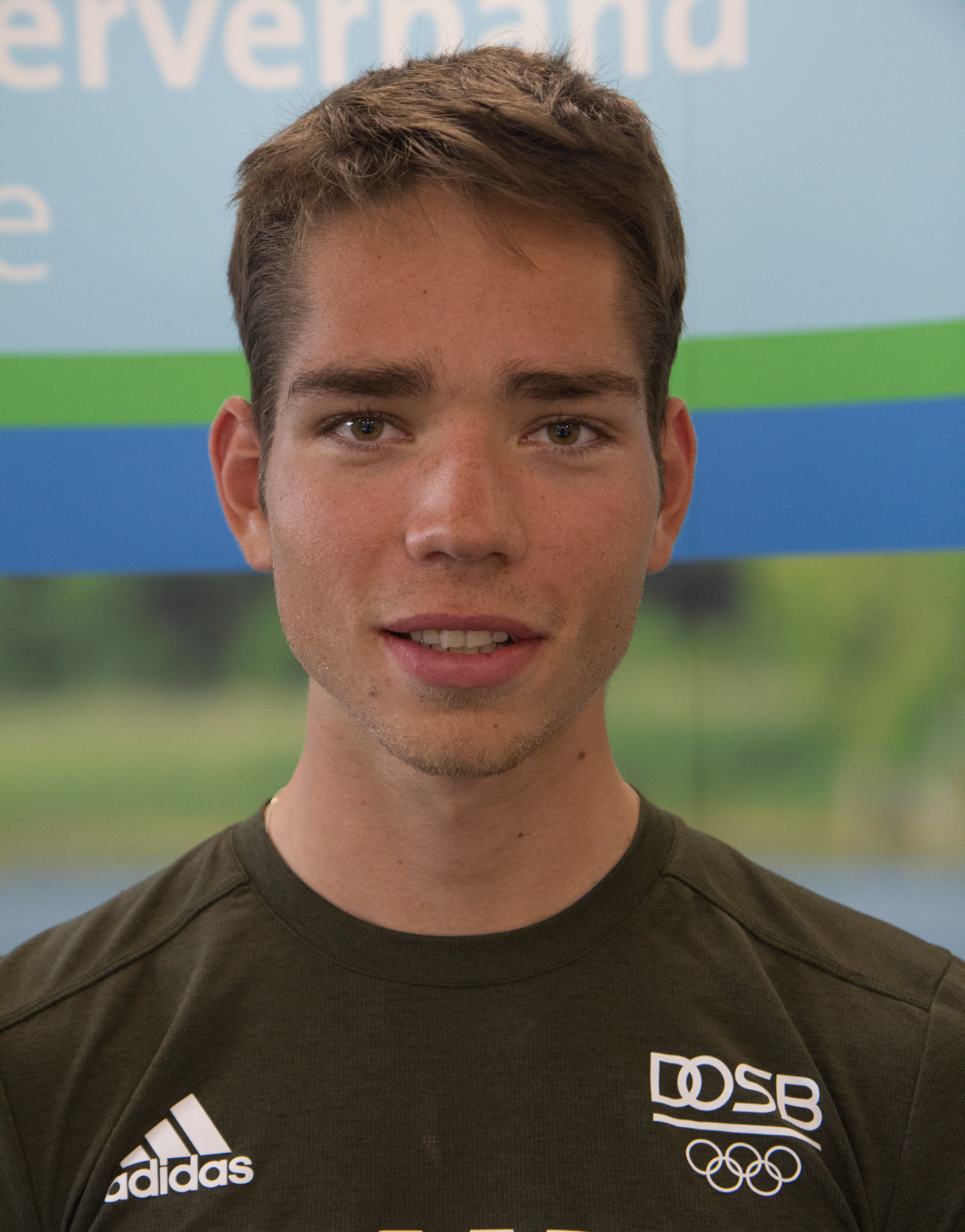

Personal information
- Nationality: German
- Born: 15 August 1994 (age 31)
- Height: 187 cm (6 ft 2 in)
- Weight: 70 kg (154 lb)

Sport
- Sport: Rowing

Lucas Schäfer (born 15 August 1994) is a German rower. He competed in the men's lightweight coxless four event at the 2016 Summer Olympics.
