= Yu Chenggang =

Chinese rower

Personal information
- Born: 23 February 1984 (age 42)

Sport
- Sport: Rowing

Yu Chenggang (born 23 February 1984) is a Chinese rower. He competed in the men's lightweight coxless four event at the 2016 Summer Olympics.
