= Jacob Larsen (rower) =

Danish rower (born 1988)

Medal record

Men's rowing

Representing Denmark

Olympic Games
Silver medal – second place	2016 Rio de Janeiro	LM4−

World Championships
Gold medal – first place	2013 Chungju	LM4−
Gold medal – first place	2014 Amsterdam	LM4−
Silver medal – second place	2015 Aiguebelette	LM4−
Bronze medal – third place	2011 Bled	LM8+

European Championships
Gold medal – first place	2013 Seville	LM4−
Gold medal – first place	2014 Belgrade	LM4−

Jacob Larsen (born 13 June 1988 in Søllerød) is a Danish rower. He has won three gold medals at European and World championships as part of the Gold Four.
