= Mario Gyr =

Swiss rower (born 1985)

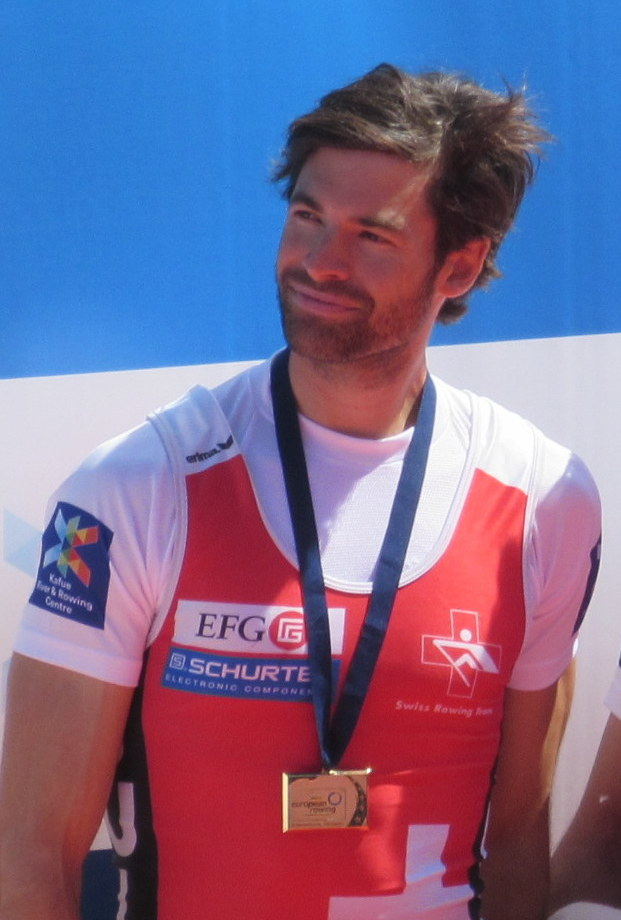
- Gyr in 2016

Personal information
- Nationality: Swiss
- Born: 2 May 1985 (age 41) Lucerne, Switzerland
- Height: 1.87 m (6 ft 2 in)
- Weight: 76 kg (168 lb)

Sport
- Country: Switzerland
- Sport: Rowing
- Club: Seeclub-Luzern
Medal record
Olympic Games
Gold medal – first place	2016 Rio de Janeiro	LM4−
World Championships
Gold medal – first place	2015 Aiguebelette	LM4−
Silver medal – second place	2013 Chungjiu	LM2x

Mario Gyr (born 2 May 1985) is a Swiss rower. He won gold at the 2016 Summer Olympics in the men's lightweight four with Lucas Tramèr, Simon Schürch and Simon Niepmann. The same team, coached by New Zealander Ian Wright, also won this event in the 2015 World Championships. He also competed in the men's lightweight coxless four event at the 2012 Summer Olympics, finishing fifth.
