= Thibault Colard =

French rower (born 1992)

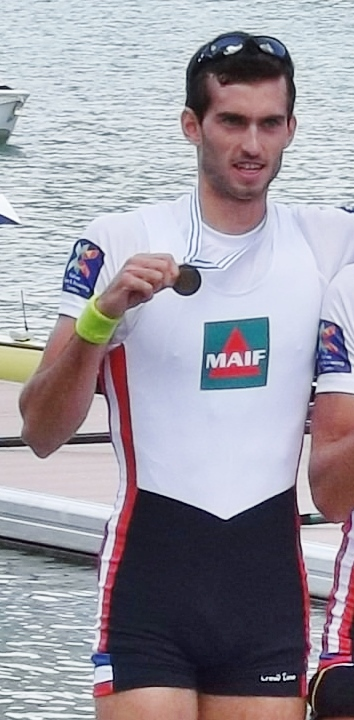

Personal information
- Born: 13 January 1992 (age 34) Fontainebleau, France

Sport
- Sport: Rowing
Medal record
Men's rowing
Representing France
Olympic Games
Bronze medal – third place	2016 Rio de Janeiro	LM4−

Thibault Colard (born 13 January 1992) is a French rower. He competed in the men's lightweight coxless four event at the 2016 Summer Olympics.
