= Franck Solforosi =

French rower (born 1984)

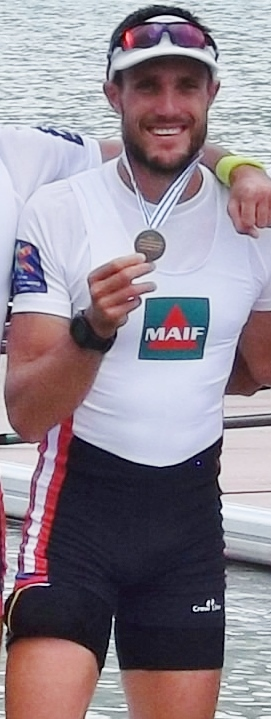
- Solforosi in 2015

Medal record

Men's rowing

Representing France

Olympic Games
Bronze medal – third place	2016 Rio de Janeiro	LM4−

World Championships
Gold medal – first place	2004 Banyoles	LM8+
Gold medal – first place	2005 Gifu	LM4-
Silver medal – second place	2006 Eton	LM4-
Silver medal – second place	2007 Munich	LM4-
Bronze medal – third place	2015 Aiguebelette	LM4−

European Championships
Bronze medal – third place	2014 Belgrade	LM4−

Franck Robert Bernard Solforosi (born 10 September 1984) is a French rower. A native of Lyon, he competed at the 2008, 2008 and 2016 Summer Olympics.
