= Jono Clegg =

British rower (born 1989)

Personal information
- Born: 14 July 1989 (age 36) Rendsburg, Schleswig-Holstein, Germany

Sport
- Sport: Rowing
- Club: Leander Club
Medal record
Men's rowing
Representing Great Britain
World Championships
Bronze medal – third place	2013 Chungju	Lwt coxless four
Bronze medal – third place	2014 Amsterdam	Lwt coxless pair

Jonathan Clegg (born 14 July 1989) known as Jono Clegg is a British rower who competed at the 2016 Summer Olympics. Clegg competed at the 2013 World Rowing Championships in Chungju, where he won a bronze medal as part of the lightweight coxless four with Adam Freeman-Pask, Will Fletcher and Chris Bartley. The following year he competed at the 2014 World Rowing Championships in Bosbaan, Amsterdam, where he won a bronze medal as part of the lightweight coxless pair with Sam Scrimgeour.

Two years later he was selected for the British Olympic team and competed in the men's lightweight coxless four event with Chris Bartley, Mark Aldred and Peter Chambers finishing in seventh place.
