= Tatsiana Kukhta =

Belarusian rower

Personal information
- Born: 13 June 1990 (age 36)

Sport
- Sport: Rowing

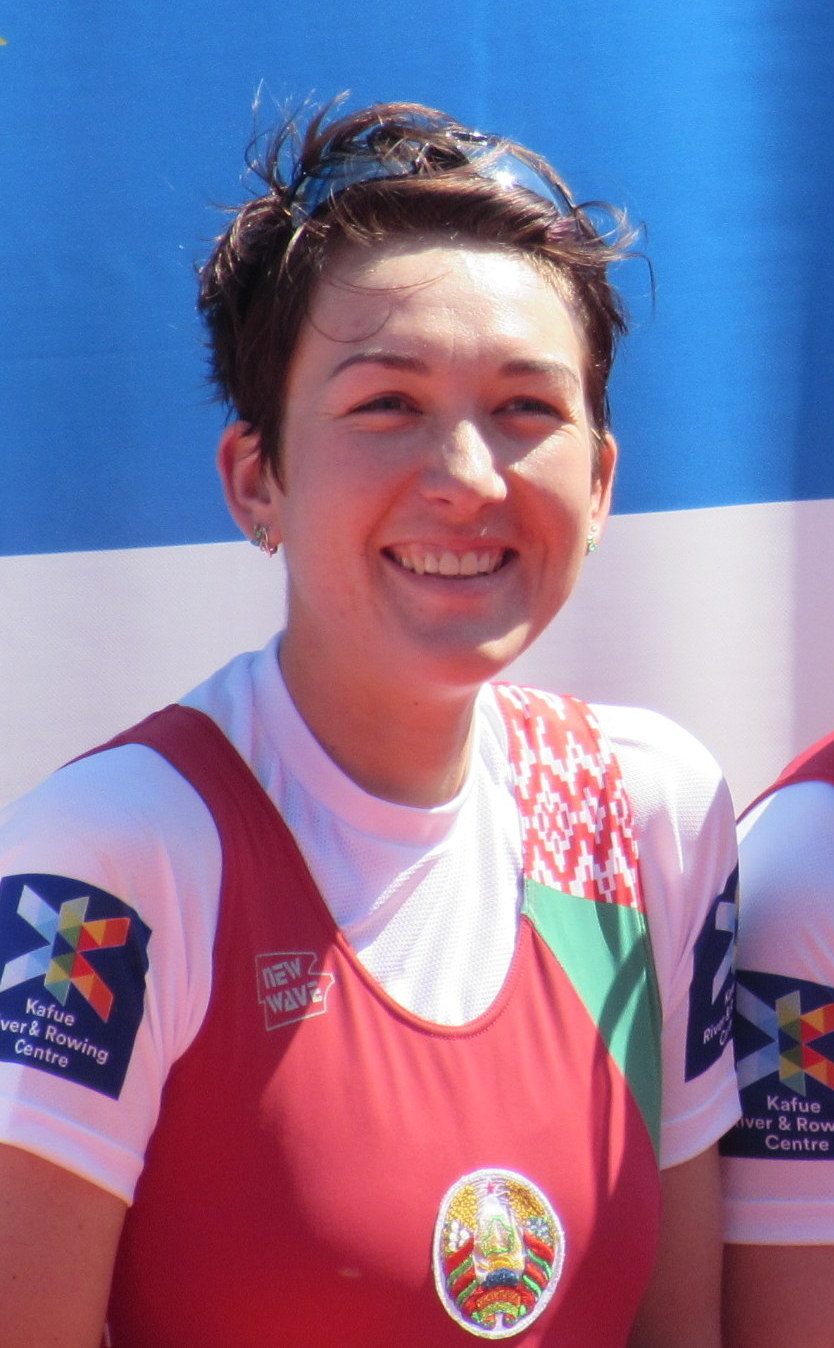

Tatsiana Kukhta (born 13 June 1990) is a Belarusian rower. She competed in the women's double sculls event at the 2016 Summer Olympics.
