= Guillaume Raineau =

French rower (born 1986)

- Raineau in 2015

Personal information
- Full name: Guillaume Louis Benoît Philippe Raineau
- Born: 29 June 1986 (age 40) Nantes, France
- Height: 1.87 m (6 ft 2 in)
- Weight: 70 kg (154 lb)
Medal record
Men's Rowing
Representing France
Olympic Games
Bronze medal – third place	2016 Rio de Janeiro	LM4−
World Championships
Bronze medal – third place	2015 Aiguebelette	LM4−

Guillaume Louis Benoît Philippe Raineau (born 29 June 1986 in Nantes) is a French rower. He finished 4th in the men's lightweight coxless four at the 2008 Summer Olympics.
