= Simon Niepmann =

Swiss rower

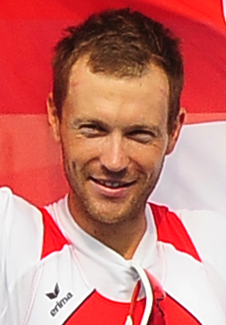

Personal information
- Nationality: Swiss
- Born: 2 August 1985 (age 40) Lörrach, Germany

Sport
- Country: Switzerland
- Sport: Rowing
Medal record
Olympic Games
Gold medal – first place	2016 Rio de Janeiro	LM4−
World Championships
Gold medal – first place	2013 Chungju	LM2−
Gold medal – first place	2014 Amsterdam	LM2−
Gold medal – first place	2015 Aiguebelette	LM4−
European Championships
Gold medal – first place	2014 Belgrade	LM2−

Simon Niepmann (born 2 August 1985) is a Swiss rower. He is a gold medal winner at the 2016 Rio Olympics in the men's lightweight four, with the team being coached by New Zealander Ian Wright. He also competed in the Men's lightweight coxless four event at the 2012 Summer Olympics.
