= 2017 World Rowing Championships – Men's lightweight quadruple sculls =

Men's lightweight quadruple sculls at the 2017 World Rowing Championships
- Venue: Nathan Benderson Park
- Location: Sarasota, United States
- Dates: 25–29 September
- Competitors: 64 from 16 nations
- Winning time: 5:51.85

Medalists
gold medal	François Teroin; Damien Piqueras; Maxime Demontfaucon; Stany Delayre	France
silver medal	Edward Fisher; Zak Lee-Green; Peter Chambers; Gavin Horsburgh	Great Britain
bronze medal	Ninos Nikolaidis; Panagiotis Magdanis; Spyridon Giannaros; Eleftherios Konsolas	Greece

The men's lightweight quadruple sculls competition at the 2017 World Rowing Championships in Sarasota took place in Nathan Benderson Park.

== Schedule ==
The schedule was as follows:

Date	Time	Round
Monday 25 September 2017	10:00	Heats
Tuesday 26 September 2017	12:08	Repechages
Thursday 28 September 2017	10:51	Semifinals A/B
Thursday 28 September 2017	13:41	Final C
Friday 29 September 2017	09:15	Final B
Friday 29 September 2017	12:45	Final A

All times are Eastern Daylight Time (UTC-4)

== Results ==
=== Heats ===
The two fastest boats in each heat advanced directly to the A/B semifinals. The remaining boats were sent to the repechages.

==== Heat 1 ====
Rank	Rowers	Country	Time	Notes
1	François Teroin; Damien Piqueras; Maxime Demontfaucon; Stany Delayre	France	5:59.47	SA/B
2	Edward Fisher; Zak Lee-Green; Peter Chambers; Gavin Horsburgh	Great Britain	6:03.11	SA/B
3	Diego Donizette Nazario; Emanuel Dantas Borges; Evaldo Becker Morais; Ailson Silva	Brazil	6:09.45	R
4	Edvin Novak; Jonas Ningelgen; Joachim Agne; Johannes Ursprung	Germany	6:09.98	R
5	Leung Chun Shek; Liu Kenneth; Chiu Hin Chun; Tang Chiu Mang	Hong Kong	6:12.05	R
6	Petter Svingen; Didrik Wie-Soltvedt; Ask Jarl Tjoem; Jens Holm	Norway	6:15.85	R

==== Heat 2 ====
Rank	Rowers	Country	Time	Notes
1	Ninos Nikolaidis; Panagiotis Magdanis; Spyridon Giannaros; Eleftherios Konsolas	Greece	5:59.21	SA/B
2	Paul Sieber; Julian Schöberl; Bernhard Sieber; Rainer Kepplinger	Austria	6:00.92	SA/B
3	Hideki Omoto; Mitsuo Nishimura; Yasushi Fukui; Kazuki Nara	Japan	6:01.90	R
4	Jiří Kopáč; Milan Viktora; Jan Vetešník; Jan Hajek	Czech Republic	6:08.69	R
5	Matthias Fernández García; Andri Struzina; Fiorin Rüedi; Pascal Ryser	Switzerland	6:10.11	R

==== Heat 3 ====
Rank	Rowers	Country	Time	Notes
1	Matteo Mulas; Catello Amarante; Martino Goretti; Andrea Micheletti	Italy	6:01.73	SA/B
2	Li Xueping; Dong Tianfeng; Lyu Fanpu; Tian Bin	China	6:04.51	SA/B
3	Balázs Fiala; Bence Tamás; Peter Csiszar; Peter Krpesics	Hungary	6:06.41	R
4	Cameron Fowler; Redmond Matthews; James Kerr; Hamish Parry	Australia	6:08.44	R
5	Jack Ruske; Jacob Georgeson; Brendon Harrington; Will Young	United States	6:20.17	R

=== Repechages ===
The three fastest boats in each repechage advanced to the A/B semifinals. The remaining boats were sent to the C final.

==== Repechage 1 ====
Rank	Rowers	Country	Time	Notes
1	Matthias Fernández García; Andri Struzina; Fiorin Rüedi; Pascal Ryser	Switzerland	5:59.89	SA/B
2	Hideki Omoto; Mitsuo Nishimura; Yasushi Fukui; Kazuki Nara	Japan	6:00.01	SA/B
3	Cameron Fowler; Redmond Matthews; James Kerr; Hamish Parry	Australia	6:04.35	SA/B
4	Diego Donizette Nazario; Emanuel Dantas Borges; Evaldo Becker Morais; Ailson Silva	Brazil	6:06.04	FC
5	Petter Svingen; Didrik Wie-Soltvedt; Ask Jarl Tjoem; Jens Holm	Norway	6:06.45	FC

==== Repechage 2 ====
Rank	Rowers	Country	Time	Notes
1	Jiří Kopáč; Milan Viktora; Jan Vetešník; Jan Hajek	Czech Republic	6:01.44	SA/B
2	Edvin Novak; Jonas Ningelgen; Joachim Agne; Johannes Ursprung	Germany	6:02.03	SA/B
3	Balázs Fiala; Bence Tamás; Peter Csiszar; Peter Krpesics	Hungary	6:03.60	SA/B
4	Leung Chun Shek; Liu Kenneth; Chiu Hin Chun; Tang Chiu Mang	Hong Kong	6:09.78	FC
5	Jack Ruske; Jacob Georgeson; Brendon Harrington; Will Young	United States	6:16.85	FC

=== Semifinals ===
The three fastest boats in each semi advanced to the A final. The remaining boats were sent to the B final.

==== Semifinal 1 ====
Rank	Rowers	Country	Time	Notes
1	François Teroin; Damien Piqueras; Maxime Demontfaucon; Stany Delayre	France	5:56.55	FA
2	Matteo Mulas; Catello Amarante; Martino Goretti; Andrea Micheletti	Italy	5:57.65	FA
3	Matthias Fernández García; Andri Struzina; Fiorin Rüedi; Pascal Ryser	Switzerland	5:59.27	FA
4	Edvin Novak; Jonas Ningelgen; Joachim Agne; Johannes Ursprung	Germany	6:01.43	FB
5	Paul Sieber; Julian Schöberl; Bernhard Sieber; Rainer Kepplinger	Austria	6:02.57	FB
6	Cameron Fowler; Redmond Matthews; James Kerr; Hamish Parry	Australia	6:12.66	FB

==== Semifinal 2 ====
Rank	Rowers	Country	Time	Notes
1	Edward Fisher; Zak Lee-Green; Peter Chambers; Gavin Horsburgh	Great Britain	5:57.19	FA
2	Ninos Nikolaidis; Panagiotis Magdanis; Spyridon Giannaros; Eleftherios Konsolas	Greece	5:59.18	FA
3	Hideki Omoto; Mitsuo Nishimura; Yasushi Fukui; Kazuki Nara	Japan	5:59.36	FA
4	Jiří Kopáč; Milan Viktora; Jan Vetešník; Jan Hajek	Czech Republic	6:04.18	FB
5	Balázs Fiala; Bence Tamás; Peter Csiszar; Peter Krpesics	Hungary	6:05.13	FB
6	Li Xueping; Dong Tianfeng; Lyu Fanpu; Tian Bin	China	6:06.65	FB

=== Finals ===
The A final determined the rankings for places 1 to 6. Additional rankings were determined in the other finals.

==== Final C ====
Rank	Rowers	Country	Time
1	Diego Donizette Nazario; Emanuel Dantas Borges; Evaldo Becker Morais; Ailson Silva	Brazil	6:04.18
2	Leung Chun Shek; Liu Kenneth; Chiu Hin Chun; Tang Chiu Mang	Hong Kong	6:05.11
3	Petter Svingen; Didrik Wie-Soltvedt; Ask Jarl Tjoem; Jens Holm	Norway	6:07.00
4	Jack Ruske; Jacob Georgeson; Brendon Harrington; Will Young	United States	6:08.35

==== Final B ====
Rank	Rowers	Country	Time
1	Edvin Novak; Jonas Ningelgen; Joachim Agne; Johannes Ursprung	Germany	6:06.39
2	Li Xueping; Dong Tianfeng; Lyu Fanpu; Tian Bin	China	6:06.83
3	Jiří Kopáč; Milan Viktora; Jan Vetešník; Jan Hajek	Czech Republic	6:07.37
4	Paul Sieber; Julian Schöberl; Bernhard Sieber; Rainer Kepplinger	Austria	6:07.95
5	Balázs Fiala; Bence Tamás; Peter Csiszar; Peter Krpesics	Hungary	6:11.51
6	Cameron Fowler; Redmond Matthews; James Kerr; Hamish Parry	Australia	6:15.31

==== Final A ====
Rank	Rowers	Country	Time
1st place, gold medalist(s)	François Teroin; Damien Piqueras; Maxime Demontfaucon; Stany Delayre	France	5:51.85
2nd place, silver medalist(s)	Edward Fisher; Zak Lee-Green; Peter Chambers; Gavin Horsburgh	Great Britain	5:52.02
3rd place, bronze medalist(s)	Ninos Nikolaidis; Panagiotis Magdanis; Spyridon Giannaros; Eleftherios Konsolas	Greece	5:53.64
4	Matteo Mulas; Catello Amarante; Martino Goretti; Andrea Micheletti	Italy	5:54.12
5	Hideki Omoto; Mitsuo Nishimura; Yasushi Fukui; Kazuki Nara	Japan	5:56.99
6	Matthias Fernández García; Andri Struzina; Fiorin Rüedi; Pascal Ryser	Switzerland	5:58.33
