= Panagiotis Magdanis =

Greek rower (born 1990)

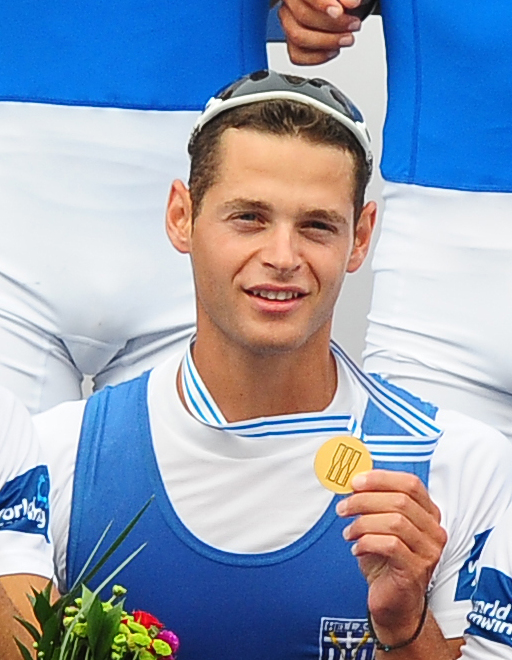
- Magdanis in 2013

Personal information
- Born: 29 November 1990 (age 35) Myrina, Greece
- Height: 1.75 m (5 ft 9 in)
- Weight: 71 kg (157 lb)

Sport
- Country: Greece
- Sport: Rowing
Medal record
Men's rowing
Representing Greece
World Championships
Gold medal – first place	2013 Chungju	Lwt quad sculls
Gold medal – first place	2014 Amsterdam	Lwt quad sculls
Silver medal – second place	2012 Plovdiv	Lwt quad sculls
Bronze medal – third place	2016 Rotterdam	Lwt quad sculls
Bronze medal – third place	2017 Sarasota	Lwt quad sculls
European Championships
Gold medal – first place	2012 Varese	Lwt double sculls
Silver medal – second place	2011 Plovdiv	Lwt double sculls

Panagiotis Magdanis (born 29 November 1990) is a Greek rower. He is a two-time World Champion in the men's lightweight quadruple sculls.

He competed at the 2016 Summer Olympics in Rio de Janeiro, in the men's lightweight coxless four, finishing in the sixth place. He also participated in the 2012 Summer Olympics in London where he competed in the Men's lightweight double sculls event together with his teammate Eleftherios Konsolas. They qualified for the B finals, where they reached second place, finishing in 8th place overall.

== Career ==
Magdanis's first international competition was the 2008 Junior World Championships, where he competed in the men's single scull. He then teamed up with Konsolas to win the gold medal at the 2010 Under-23 World Championships in the men's lightweight double scull. He won silver the next year, in the U23 individual scull.

He and Konsolas won their first senior international medal at the 2011 European Championships, in the lightweight double sculls. Magdanis and Konsolas joined Nikolaos Afentoulus and Georgios Konsolas in the Greek lightweight quadruple sculls team that won silver at the 2012 World Championships. That year, as well as competing in the Olympic men's lightweight double sculls with Eleftherios Konsolas, he won the European title in the lightweight double sculls with Spyridon Giannaros.

Magdanis, Eleftherious Konsolas, Georgios Konsolas and Giannaros won the men's lightweight quadruple sculls at the 2013 World Championships, and then retained their title at the 2014 World Championships. The team also won bronze at the 2016 World Championships, and then the team of Magdanis, Eleftherious Konsolas, Giannaros and Ninos Nikolaidis won bronze at the 2017 World Championships.
