= 2016 World Rowing Championships – Men's coxed pair =

Men's coxed pair at the 2016 World Rowing Championships
- Venue: Willem-Alexander Baan
- Location: Rotterdam, Netherlands
- Dates: 22–27 August
- Competitors: 45 from 15 nations
- Winning time: 7:29:69

Medalists
gold medal	Oliver Cook; Callum McBrierty; Henry Fieldman	Great Britain
silver medal	Andrew Stewart-Jones; Benjamin de Wit; Kevin Chung	Canada
bronze medal	Mario Paonessa; Vincenzo Capelli; Andrea Riva	Italy

The men's coxed pair competition at the 2016 World Rowing Championships in Rotterdam took place at the Willem-Alexander Baan.

== Schedule ==
The schedule was as follows:

Date	Time	Round
Monday 22 August 2016	16:20	Heats
Tuesday 23 August 2016	10:55	Repechage
Thursday 25 August 2016	15:15	Semifinals A/B
Saturday 27 August 2016	10:50	Final C
Saturday 27 August 2016	11:10	Final B
Saturday 27 August 2016	12:10	Final A

All times are Central European Summer Time (UTC+2)

== Results ==
=== Heats ===
The three fastest boats in each heat advanced directly to the A/B semifinals. The remaining boats were sent to the repechage.

==== Heat 1 ====
Rank	Rowers	Country	Time	Notes
1	Mario Paonessa; Vincenzo Capelli; Andrea Riva	Italy	7:03.05	SA/B
2	Javier García Ordóñez; Ismael Montes; Tomas Jurado	Spain	7:03.60	SA/B
3	Dzimitry Furman; Dzianis Suravets; Piotr Piatrynich	Belarus	7:05.51	SA/B
4	Leo Victor Davis; Charles Brittain; Jabulani Khumalo	South Africa	7:09.62	R
5	Kristian Vasilev; Georgi Bozhilov; Andon Stamenov	Bulgaria	7:13.17	R

==== Heat 2 ====
Rank	Rowers	Country	Time	Notes
1	Roel Braas; Mitchel Steenman; Peter Wiersum	Netherlands	7:00.52	SA/B
2	Yohann Rigogne; Thomas Peszek; Louis Lombardi	United States	7:01.78	SA/B
3	Benoit Demey; Benoît Brunet; Thibaut Hacot	France	7:05.81	SA/B
4	Onat Kazakli; Besim Şahinoğlu; Kaan Sahin	Turkey	7:06.67	R
5	Aleksander Stromkin; Dmitry Demchuk; Evgeny Sologub-Antonov	Russia	7:30.47	R

==== Heat 3 ====
Rank	Rowers	Country	Time	Notes
1	Oliver Cook; Callum McBrierty; Henry Fieldman	Great Britain	6:59.31	SA/B
2	Andrew Stewart-Jones; Benjamin de Wit; Kevin Chung	Canada	7:02.82	SA/B
3	Serhiy Hryn; Artem Moroz; Oleksandr Konovaliuk	Ukraine	7:10.73	SA/B
4	Matyáš Klang; Jakub Makovička; Radek Suma	Czech Republic	7:12.22	R
5	Nico Merget; Maximilian Fränkel; Felix Lindemann	Germany	7:14.90	R

=== Repechage ===
The three fastest boats advanced to the A/B semifinals. The remaining boats were sent to the C final.

Rank	Rowers	Country	Time	Notes
1	Matyáš Klang; Jakub Makovička; Radek Suma	Czech Republic	7:04.34	SA/B
2	Onat Kazakli; Besim Şahinoğlu; Kaan Sahin	Turkey	7:04.89	SA/B
3	Nico Merget; Maximilian Fränkel; Felix Lindemann	Germany	7:04.92	SA/B
4	Leo Victor Davis; Charles Brittain; Jabulani Khumalo	South Africa	7:10.08	FC
5	Kristian Vasilev; Georgi Bozhilov; Andon Stamenov	Bulgaria	7:10.34	FC
6	Aleksander Stromkin; Dmitry Demchuk; Evgeny Sologub-Antonov	Russia	7:19.79	FC

=== Semifinals ===
The three fastest boats in each semi advanced to the A final. The remaining boats were sent to the B final.

==== Semifinal 1 ====
Rank	Rowers	Country	Time	Notes
1	Oliver Cook; Callum McBrierty; Henry Fieldman	Great Britain	6:54.58	FA
2	Yohann Rigogne; Thomas Peszek; Louis Lombardi	United States	6:54.70	FA
3	Mario Paonessa; Vincenzo Capelli; Andrea Riva	Italy	6:56.59	FA
4	Matyáš Klang; Jakub Makovička; Radek Suma	Czech Republic	6:59.62	FB
5	Serhiy Hryn; Artem Moroz; Oleksandr Konovaliuk	Ukraine	6:59.92	FB
6	Onat Kazakli; Besim Şahinoğlu; Kaan Sahin	Turkey	7:03.69	FB

==== Semifinal 2 ====
Rank	Rowers	Country	Time	Notes
1	Andrew Stewart-Jones; Benjamin de Wit; Kevin Chung	Canada	6:55.24	FA
2	Roel Braas; Mitchel Steenman; Peter Wiersum	Netherlands	6:55.91	FA
3	Javier García Ordóñez; Ismael Montes; Tomas Jurado	Spain	6:56.64	FA
4	Dzimitry Furman; Dzianis Suravets; Piotr Piatrynich	Belarus	6:59.43	FB
5	Benoit Demey; Benoît Brunet; Thibaut Hacot	France	7:01.68	FB
6	Nico Merget; Maximilian Fränkel; Felix Lindemann	Germany	7:08.20	FB

=== Finals ===
The A final determined the rankings for places 1 to 6. Additional rankings were determined in the other finals.

==== Final C ====
Rank	Rowers	Country	Time
1	Leo Victor Davis; Charles Brittain; Jabulani Khumalo	South Africa	7:51.16
2	Aleksander Stromkin; Dmitry Demchuk; Evgeny Sologub-Antonov	Russia	8:04.69
3	Kristian Vasilev; Georgi Bozhilov; Andon Stamenov	Bulgaria	DNS

==== Final B ====
Rank	Rowers	Country	Time
1	Dzimitry Furman; Dzianis Suravets; Piotr Piatrynich	Belarus	7:43.43
2	Onat Kazakli; Besim Şahinoğlu; Kaan Sahin	Turkey	7:43.83
3	Benoit Demey; Benoît Brunet; Thibaut Hacot	France	7:45.69
4	Serhiy Hryn; Artem Moroz; Oleksandr Konovaliuk	Ukraine	7:48.60
5	Matyáš Klang; Jakub Makovička; Radek Suma	Czech Republic	7:49.31
6	Nico Merget; Maximilian Fränkel; Felix Lindemann	Germany	7:51.56

==== Final A ====
Rank	Rowers	Country	Time
1st place, gold medalist(s)	Oliver Cook; Callum McBrierty; Henry Fieldman	Great Britain	7:29.69
2nd place, silver medalist(s)	Andrew Stewart-Jones; Benjamin de Wit; Kevin Chung	Canada	7:32.05
3rd place, bronze medalist(s)	Mario Paonessa; Vincenzo Capelli; Andrea Riva	Italy	7:32.22
4	Roel Braas; Mitchel Steenman; Peter Wiersum	Netherlands	7:32.98
5	Yohann Rigogne; Thomas Peszek; Louis Lombardi	United States	7:37.95
6	Javier García Ordóñez; Ismael Montes; Tomas Jurado	Spain	7:54.31
