= 2016 World Rowing Championships – Men's lightweight quadruple sculls =

Men's lightweight quadruple sculls at the 2016 World Rowing Championships
- Venue: Willem-Alexander Baan
- Location: Rotterdam, Netherlands
- Dates: 22–27 August
- Competitors: 44 from 11 nations
- Winning time: 6:23:09

Medalists
gold medal	Patrik Stöcker; Florian Roller; Johannes Ursprung; Cedric Kulbach	Germany
silver medal	François Teroin; Damien Piqueras; Maxime Demontfaucon; Morgan Maunoir	France
bronze medal	Georgios Konsolas; Spyridon Giannaros; Panagiotis Magdanis; Eleftherios Konsolas	Greece

The men's lightweight quadruple sculls competition at the 2016 World Rowing Championships in Rotterdam took place at the Willem-Alexander Baan.

== Schedule ==
The schedule was as follows:

Date	Time	Round
Monday 22 August 2016	17:40	Heats
Tuesday 23 August 2016	11:35	Repechages
Saturday 27 August 2016	11:30	Final B
Saturday 27 August 2016	13:25	Final A

All times are Central European Summer Time (UTC+2)

== Results ==
=== Heats ===
Heat winners advanced directly to the A final. The remaining boats were sent to the repechages.

==== Heat 1 ====
Rank	Rowers	Country	Time	Notes
1	Georgios Konsolas; Spyridon Giannaros; Panagiotis Magdanis; Eleftherios Konsolas	Greece	5:57.46	FA
2	Steffen Jensen; Andrej Bendtsen; Jens Nielsen; Mathias Larsen	Denmark	5:59.35	R
3	Francesco Rigon; Andrea Fois; Michele Quaranta; Catello Amarante II	Italy	6:00.97	R
4	Taylor Hardy; Mark Henry; Joshua King; Thomas Rendall	Canada	6:01.98	R
5	Charles Waite-Roberts; Jamie Copus; Jamie Kirkwood; Zak Lee-Green	Great Britain	6:03.17	R
6	Pavel Garanin; Alexey Nekrasov; Anton Kuranov; Nazar Lifshitc	Russia	6:07.06	R

==== Heat 2 ====
Rank	Rowers	Country	Time	Notes
1	Roman Fedorenko; Stanislav Kovalov; Serhii Siabro; Ihor Khmara	Ukraine	5:52.73	FA
2	François Teroin; Damien Piqueras; Maxime Demontfaucon; Morgan Maunoir	France	5:53.12	R
3	Patrik Stöcker; Florian Roller; Johannes Ursprung; Cedric Kulbach	Germany	5:57.87	R
4	Ward van Zeijl; Sander van Dijk; Berend Mortier; Just van der Endt	Netherlands	6:01.85	R
5	Tobin McGee; Christopher Lambert-Rogers; Peter Schmidt; Jacob Georgeson	United States	6:28.77	R

=== Repechages ===
The two fastest boats in each repechage advanced to the A final. The remaining boats were sent to the B final.

==== Repechage 1 ====
Rank	Rowers	Country	Time	Notes
1	Patrik Stöcker; Florian Roller; Johannes Ursprung; Cedric Kulbach	Germany	5:52.07	FA
2	Steffen Jensen; Andrej Bendtsen; Jens Nielsen; Mathias Larsen	Denmark	5:54.38	FA
3	Taylor Hardy; Mark Henry; Joshua King; Thomas Rendall	Canada	5:54.42	FB
4	Pavel Garanin; Alexey Nekrasov; Anton Kuranov; Nazar Lifshitc	Russia	6:05.70	FB
5	Tobin McGee; Christopher Lambert-Rogers; Peter Schmidt; Jacob Georgeson	United States	6:11.49	FB

==== Repechage 2 ====
Rank	Rowers	Country	Time	Notes
1	François Teroin; Damien Piqueras; Maxime Demontfaucon; Morgan Maunoir	France	5:52.04	FA
2	Charles Waite-Roberts; Jamie Copus; Jamie Kirkwood; Zak Lee-Green	Great Britain	5:52.44	FA
3	Ward van Zeijl; Sander van Dijk; Berend Mortier; Just van der Endt	Netherlands	5:53.07	FB
4	Francesco Rigon; Andrea Fois; Michele Quaranta; Catello Amarante II	Italy	5:57.30	FB

=== Finals ===
The A final determined the rankings for places 1 to 6. Additional rankings were determined in the B final.

==== Final B ====
Rank	Rowers	Country	Time
1	Ward van Zeijl; Sander van Dijk; Berend Mortier; Just van der Endt	Netherlands	6:38.60
2	Francesco Rigon; Andrea Fois; Michele Quaranta; Catello Amarante II	Italy	6:39.48
3	Taylor Hardy; Mark Henry; Joshua King; Thomas Rendall	Canada	6:40.32
4	Pavel Garanin; Alexey Nekrasov; Anton Kuranov; Nazar Lifshitc	Russia	6:52.59
5	Tobin McGee; Christopher Lambert-Rogers; Peter Schmidt; Jacob Georgeson	United States	6:54.80

==== Final A ====
Rank	Rowers	Country	Time
1st place, gold medalist(s)	Patrik Stöcker; Florian Roller; Johannes Ursprung; Cedric Kulbach	Germany	6:23.09
2nd place, silver medalist(s)	François Teroin; Damien Piqueras; Maxime Demontfaucon; Morgan Maunoir	France	6:24.72
3rd place, bronze medalist(s)	Georgios Konsolas; Spyridon Giannaros; Panagiotis Magdanis; Eleftherios Konsolas	Greece	6:26.58
4	Roman Fedorenko; Stanislav Kovalov; Serhii Siabro; Ihor Khmara	Ukraine	6:28.63
5	Steffen Jensen; Andrej Bendtsen; Jens Nielsen; Mathias Larsen	Denmark	6:29.68
6	Charles Waite-Roberts; Jamie Copus; Jamie Kirkwood; Zak Lee-Green	Great Britain	6:31.71
