= 2018 World Rowing Championships – Men's lightweight quadruple sculls =

Men's lightweight quadruple sculls at the 2018 World Rowing Championships
- Venue: Plovdiv Regatta Venue
- Location: Plovdiv, Bulgaria
- Dates: 10–14 September
- Competitors: 44 from 11 nations
- Winning time: 5:51.21

Medalists
gold medal	Joachim Agne; Max Röger; Florian Roller; Moritz Moos	Germany
silver medal	Catello Amarante; Paolo Di Girolamo; Andrea Micheletti; Matteo Mulas	Italy
bronze medal	Mert Kartal; Bayram Sönmez; Fatih Ünsal; Enes Kuşku	Turkey

The men's lightweight quadruple sculls competition at the 2018 World Rowing Championships in Plovdiv took place at the Plovdiv Regatta Venue.

== Schedule ==
The schedule was as follows:

Date	Time	Round
Monday 10 September 2018	10:18	Heats
Wednesday 12 September 2018	11:57	Repechages
Friday 14 September 2018	12:30	Final A
Friday 14 September 2018	15:03	Final B

All times are Eastern European Summer Time (UTC+3)

== Results ==
=== Heats ===
Heat winners advanced directly to the A final. The remaining boats were sent to the repechages.

==== Heat 1 ====
Rank	Rowers	Country	Time	Notes
1	Florian Roller; Moritz Moos; Max Röger; Joachim Agne	Germany	5:50.44	FA
2	Mert Kartal; Bayram Sönmez; Fatih Ünsal; Enes Kuşku	Turkey	5:53.75	R
3	Peter Csiszar; Balázs Fiala; Bence Tamás; David Forrai	Hungary	5:56.21	R
4	Frederik Taulbjerg; Jonas Lund; Jens Graudal; Christian Hagemann	Denmark	5:56.36	R
5	Alexander Loy; Samuel Hausmann; Michael Landuyt; James Nelson	United States	6:02.13	R
6	Mohamed Abderraouf Djouimai; Boucif Mohammed Belhadj; Kamel Ait Daoud; Sid Ali Boudina	Algeria	6:13.21	R

==== Heat 2 ====
Rank	Rowers	Country	Time	Notes
1	Catello Amarante; Paolo Di Girolamo; Andrea Micheletti; Matteo Mulas	Italy	5:48.03	FA
2	Jiří Kopáč; Jan Vetešník; Milan Viktora; Jan Cincibuch	Czech Republic	5:53.39	R
3	Fintan McCarthy; Ryan Ballantine; Jacob McCarthy; Andrew Goff	Ireland	5:53.43	R
4	Didrik Wie-Soltvedt; Oskar Sødal; Jens Holm; Lars Benske	Norway	5:59.80	R
5	Pablo Perianes; Alejandro Vera; Manel Balastegui; Jesús González	Spain	6:01.89	R

=== Repechages ===
The two fastest boats in each repechage advanced to the A final. The remaining boats were sent to the B final.

==== Repechage 1 ====
Rank	Rowers	Country	Time	Notes
1	Mert Kartal; Bayram Sönmez; Fatih Ünsal; Enes Kuşku	Turkey	5:51.12	FA
2	Fintan McCarthy; Ryan Ballantine; Jacob McCarthy; Andrew Goff	Ireland	5:54.09	FA
3	Didrik Wie-Soltvedt; Oskar Sødal; Jens Holm; Lars Benske	Norway	5:58.57	FB
4	Alexander Loy; Samuel Hausmann; Michael Landuyt; James Nelson	United States	6:03.66	FB
5	Mohamed Abderraouf Djouimai; Boucif Mohammed Belhadj; Kamel Ait Daoud; Sid Ali Boudina	Algeria	6:07.67	FB

==== Repechage 2 ====
Rank	Rowers	Country	Time	Notes
1	Frederik Taulbjerg; Jonas Lund; Jens Graudal; Christian Hagemann	Denmark	5:51.80	FA
2	Jiří Kopáč; Jan Vetešník; Milan Viktora; Jan Cincibuch	Czech Republic	5:54.29	FA
3	Peter Csiszar; Balázs Fiala; Bence Tamás; David Forrai	Hungary	5:56.67	FB
4	Pablo Perianes; Alejandro Vera; Manel Balastegui; Jesús González	Spain	5:59.31	FB

=== Finals ===
The A final determined the rankings for places 1 to 6. Additional rankings were determined in the B final.

==== Final B ====
Rank	Rowers	Country	Time
1	Pablo Perianes; Alejandro Vera; Manel Balastegui; Jesús González	Spain	6:05.13
2	Didrik Wie-Soltvedt; Oskar Sødal; Jens Holm; Lars Benske	Norway	6:07.07
3	Peter Csiszar; Balázs Fiala; Bence Tamás; David Forrai	Hungary	6:07.25
4	Alexander Loy; Samuel Hausmann; Michael Landuyt; James Nelson	United States	6:10.88
5	Mohamed Abderraouf Djouimai; Boucif Mohammed Belhadj; Kamel Ait Daoud; Sid Ali Boudina	Algeria	6:22.64

==== Final A ====
Rank	Rowers	Country	Time
1st place, gold medalist(s)	Joachim Agne; Max Röger; Florian Roller; Moritz Moos	Germany	5:51.21
2nd place, silver medalist(s)	Catello Amarante; Paolo Di Girolamo; Andrea Micheletti; Matteo Mulas	Italy	5:52.85
3rd place, bronze medalist(s)	Mert Kartal; Bayram Sönmez; Fatih Ünsal; Enes Kuşku	Turkey	5:53.95
4	Frederik Taulbjerg; Jonas Lund; Jens Graudal; Christian Hagemann	Denmark	5:55.69
5	Fintan McCarthy; Ryan Ballantine; Jacob McCarthy; Andrew Goff	Ireland	5:56.64
6	Jiří Kopáč; Jan Vetešník; Milan Viktora; Jan Cincibuch	Czech Republic	5:59.77
