= Eleftherios Konsolas =

Greek rower (born 1988)

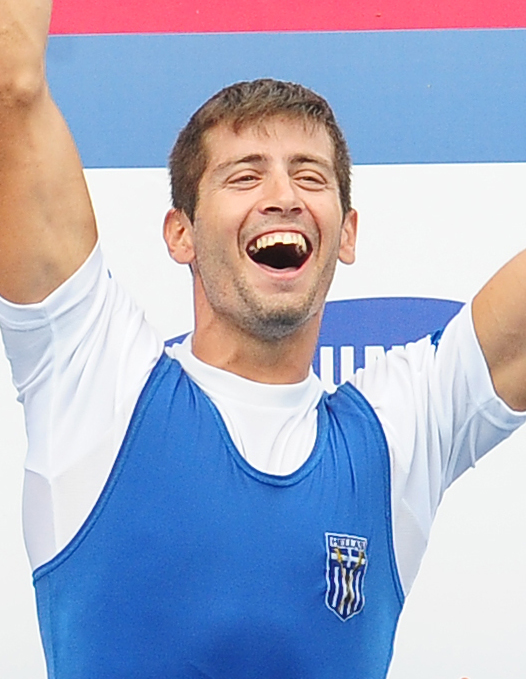
- Konsolas in 2013

Personal information
- Born: 17 December 1988 (age 37) Cholargos, Greece
- Height: 1.73 m (5 ft 8 in)
- Weight: 70 kg (154 lb)

Sport
- Country: Greece
- Sport: Rowing
Medal record
Men's rowing
Representing Greece
World Championships
Gold medal – first place	2013 Chungju	Lwt quad sculls
Gold medal – first place	2014 Amsterdam	Lwt quad sculls
Silver medal – second place	2012 Plovdiv	Lwt quad sculls
Bronze medal – third place	2016 Rotterdam	Lwt quad sculls
Bronze medal – third place	2017 Sarasota	Lwt quad sculls
European Championships
Silver medal – second place	2011 Plovdiv	Lwt double sculls

Eleftherios Konsolas (born 17 December 1988) is a Greek rower. He participated in the 2012 Summer Olympics in London where he competed in the Men's lightweight double sculls event together with his teammate Panagiotis Magdanis. They qualified for the B finals, where they reached a second place, finishing in 8th place overall.

Konsolas and Magdanis won the silver in the lightweight double sculls at the 2011 European Championships.

In 2012, the team of Konsolas, Nikolaos Afentoulis, Georgios Konsolas and Panagiotis Magdanis won silver in the men's lightweight quadruple sculls at the 2012 World Championship.

Konsolas was part of the Greek team that won the lightweight quadruple sculls at the 2013 and 2014 World Championships. On both occasions, the team consisted of Konsolas, Georgios Konsolas, Spyridon Giannaros and Panagiotis Magdanis. In 2014, the team set a world record in the event.

Konsolas won bronze at the 2016 and 2017 World Championships in the men's lightweight quadruple sculls. The 2016 team was the same as the world championship winning team. In 2017 rowed with Nikos Nikolaidis, Panagiotis Magdanis and Spyridon Giannaros.
