= Jonathan Koch =

Jonathan Koch may refer to:

- Jonathan Koch (producer), producer of The Kennedys and Urban Tarzan
- Jonathan Koch (rower) (born 1985), German rower
