= 2017 World Rowing Championships – Men's lightweight coxless four =

Men's lightweight coxless four at the 2017 World Rowing Championships
- Venue: Nathan Benderson Park
- Location: Sarasota, United States
- Dates: 27 September – 1 October
- Competitors: 24 from 6 nations
- Winning time: 5:59.60

Medalists
gold medal	Federico Duchich; Leone Barbaro; Lorenzo Tedesco; Piero Sfiligoi	Italy
silver medal	Maksim Telitcyn; Aleksandr Bogdashin; Alexander Chaukin; Aleksey Vikulin	Russia
bronze medal	Patrik Stöcker; Sven Keßler; Jonathan Koch; Julius Peschel	Germany

The men's lightweight coxless four competition at the 2017 World Rowing Championships in Sarasota took place in Nathan Benderson Park.

== Schedule ==
The schedule was as follows:

Date	Time	Round
Wednesday 27 September 2017	13:36	Exhibition race
Sunday 1 October 2017	10:12	Final

All times are Eastern Daylight Time (UTC−4)

== Results ==
=== Exhibition race ===
With fewer than seven entries in this event, boats contested a race for lanes before the final.

Rank	Rowers	Country	Time
1	Federico Duchich; Leone Barbaro; Lorenzo Tedesco; Piero Sfiligoi	Italy	6:01.82
2	Maksim Telitcyn; Aleksandr Bogdashin; Alexander Chaukin; Aleksey Vikulin	Russia	6:07.05
3	Patrik Stöcker; Sven Keßler; Jonathan Koch; Julius Peschel	Germany	6:09.27
4	Li Xiaoxiong; Wang Tiexin; Yu Chenggang; Zhao Jingbin	China	6:10.95
5	Thomas Foster; Nicholas Dawe; David Smith; Andrew Neils	United States	6:26.63
6	Balázs Fiala; Peter Csiszar; Bence Tamás; Peter Krpesics	Hungary	6:46.17

=== Final ===
The final determined the rankings.

Rank	Rowers	Country	Time
1st place, gold medalist(s)	Federico Duchich; Leone Barbaro; Lorenzo Tedesco; Piero Sfiligoi	Italy	5:59.60
2nd place, silver medalist(s)	Maksim Telitcyn; Aleksandr Bogdashin; Alexander Chaukin; Aleksey Vikulin	Russia	6:01.91
3rd place, bronze medalist(s)	Patrik Stöcker; Sven Keßler; Jonathan Koch; Julius Peschel	Germany	6:03.37
4	Li Xiaoxiong; Wang Tiexin; Yu Chenggang; Zhao Jingbin	China	6:04.62
5	Balázs Fiala; Peter Csiszar; Bence Tamás; Peter Krpesics	Hungary	6:18.60
6	Thomas Foster; Nicholas Dawe; David Smith; Andrew Neils	United States	6:27.50
