= 2018 British Rowing Senior Championships =

- Venue: National Water Sports Centre
- Location: Holme Pierrepont (Nottingham)
- Dates: 20–21 October 2018

The 2018 British Rowing Senior Championships were the 47th edition of the National Senior Championships, held from 20–21 October 2018 at the National Water Sports Centre in Holme Pierrepont, Nottingham. They were organised and sanctioned by British Rowing, and are open to British rowers.

== Medal summary ==
Event	Gold	Silver	Bronze
Victor Ludorum	Edinburgh University	n/a	n/a
Open 2x	Nottingham / Edinburgh University; Matthew Haywood & Josh Armstrong	Edinburgh University; Jack Burns & Jake Offiler	Edinburgh University; James Temple & Gavin Horsburgh
Open 4-	Goldie; Dara Alizadeh, Natan Węgrzycki-Szymczyk, Callum Sullivan, Frederick Davidson	Isis; Augustin Wambersie, Achim Harzheim, Felix Drinkall, Tobias Schroder	Oxford Brookes University; Henry Swarbrick, Sam Nunn, Rory Gibbs, Morgan Bolding
Open 4x	Leander; Victor Kleshnev, James Cartwright, Will Fletcher, Oliver Dix	Edinburgh University; Jake Offiler, Matthew Haywood, Josh Armstrong, Jack Burns	Edinburgh University; Dale Flockhart, Matthew Curtis, James Temple, Gavin Horsburgh
Open 8+	Oxford Brookes University; Oliver Wilkes, Henry Blois-Brooke, Josh Bugajski, Michael Glover, Rory Gibbs, Sam Nunn, Henry Swarbrick, Morgan Bolding, Harry Brightmore (cox)	Leander; Edward Grisedale, James Robson, Cameron Buchan, Callum McBrierty, Barnaby Stentiford, George Rossiter, Harry Glenister, Sholto Carnegie, Erin Wysocki-Jones (cox)	Molesey; Matthew Christie, Joel Cassells, George Stewart, Findlay Ralley, Oliver Salonna, Alastair Douglass, Morgan Hellen, Oliver Knight, Sasha Adwani (cox)
Women 2x	Edinburgh University; Polly Swann, Lucy Glover	Leander; Georgina Brayshaw, Katherine Copeland	London University; Rosalind Wilson, Robyn Hart-Winks
Women 4x	Leander; Katherine Maitland, Georgina Brayshaw, Mairi Buchan, Ruth Siddorn	Nottingham / Norwich; Annie Campbell-Orde, Sophie Connolly, Samantha Redgrave, Kate Parsons	Reading University; Chloe Knight, Charlotte Booth, Kate Lyster, Lucy Ryan
Women 4-	Cambridge University; Patricia Smith, Pippa Whittaker, Liliane Lindsay, Ida Jacobsen	Molesey; Emma McDonald, Ruth Whyman, Lucy Primmer, Rebecca Edwards	Edinburgh University; India Somerside, Jane Hardie, Isabella O'Hara, Alex Rankin
Women 8+	Leander; Natasha Harris-White, Laura Meridew, Charlotte Fennell, Emily Carmichael, Annie Withers, Susannah Dear, Anna Porteous, Rachel Heap, Morgan Baynham-Williams (cox)	London University; Alice Lovett, Emily Lindberg, Isobel Powell, Fionnuala Gannon, Alice Davies, Georgina Robinson Ranger, Harriet Orr, Benjamin Rich (cox)	Molesey; Emma McDonald, Pippa Birch, Molly Harding, Kristina Stone, Iona Riley, Elo Luik, Lucy Primmer, Rebecca Edwards, Autumn Mackay (cox)

Key
Symbol	meaning
1, 2, 4, 8	crew size
+	coxed
-	coxless
x	sculls
