= Federico Duchich =

Italian rower

Personal information
- Born: 19 July 1993 (age 32) Trieste, Italy
- Occupation: Student
- Years active: Since 2008
- Height: 183 cm (6 ft 0 in)
- Weight: 70.5 Kg

Sport
- Sport: Rowing
- Club: Circolo Canottieri Saturnia
Medal record
Men's rowing
Representing Italy
World Championships
Gold medal – first place	2017 Sarasota	Lwt coxless four

Federico Duchich (born 19 July 1993) is an Italian lightweight rower. He won 23 Italian championships, two gold medals at the World Coastal Rowing Championships and he won a gold medal at the 2017 World Rowing Championships in Sarasota with the lightweight men's four.
