= Florian Roller =

German rower

Personal information
- Born: 16 November 1992 (age 33)
- Height: 180 cm (5 ft 11 in)
- Weight: 70 kg (154 lb)
Medal record
Men's rowing
Representing Germany
World Championships
Gold medal – first place	2015 Aiguebelette	Lwt eight
Gold medal – first place	2016 Rotterdam	Lwt quad sculls
Gold medal – first place	2018 Plovdiv	Lwt quad sculls

Florian Roller (born 16 November 1992) is a German lightweight rower. He began rowing in 2004, and continued on to win a gold medal at the 2015 World Rowing Championships in Aiguebelette with the lightweight men's eight, at the 2016 World Rowing Championships in Rotterdam, 2018 World Rowing Championships with the lightweight men's quadruple scull.

Roller finished first in the 2018 World Cup Rowing II with Silver, World Cup Rowing III with Gold and.

He finished first World Rowing Indoor Championships in 2021, 2022, 2024 with Gold and 2023 with Silver with lightweight men's 2000m.

2018 he set the world record at 30 min Indoor Rowing.

He lives in Radolfzell, Germany.
