= Lorenzo Tedesco =

Italian rower

Personal information
- Born: 30 December 1990 (age 35)

Sport
- Sport: Rowing
Medal record
Men's rowing
Representing Italy
World Rowing Championships
Gold medal – first place	2017 Sarasota	Lwt coxless four

Lorenzo Tedesco (born 30 December 1990) is an Italian lightweight rower. He won a gold medal at the 2017 World Rowing Championships in Sarasota with the lightweight men's four.
