= Cedric Kulbach =

German lightweight rower (born 1993)

Personal information
- Born: 15 June 1993 (age 33)

Sport
- Sport: Rowing
Medal record
Men's rowing
Representing Germany
World Championships
Gold medal – first place	2016 Rotterdam	Lwt quad sculls

Cedric Kulbach (born 15 June 1993) is a German lightweight rower. He won a gold medal at the 2016 World Rowing Championships in Rotterdam with the lightweight men's quadruple scull.
