= Moritz Moos =

German rower

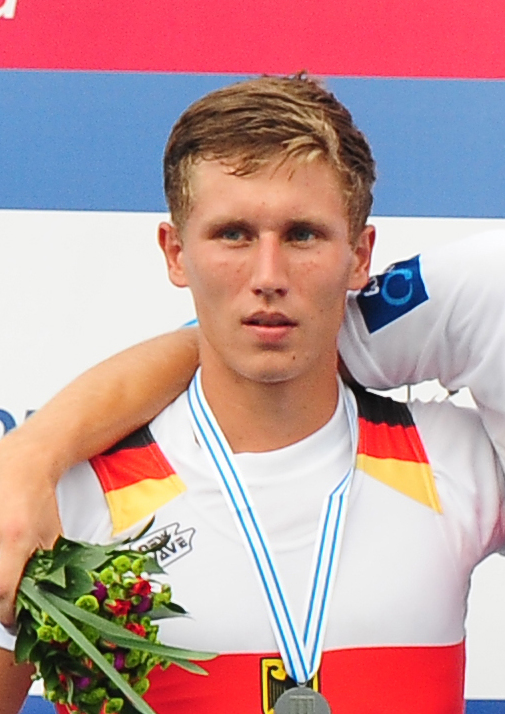
- Moos in 2013

Personal information
- Nationality: German
- Born: 15 March 1994 (age 32) Mainz, Germany
- Height: 176 cm (5 ft 9 in)
- Weight: 71 kg (157 lb)
Medal record
Men's Rowing
Representing Germany
World Championships
Gold medal – first place	2018 Plovdiv	Lwt quad sculls
Silver medal – second place	2013 Chunju	Lwt quad scull
European Championships
Silver medal – second place	2016 Brandenburg	Lwt double sculls

Moritz Moos (born 15 March 1994) is a German rower. He won silver as part of the German team in the lightweight men's quadruple sculls at the 2013 World Rowing Championships in Chungju, Korea. He competed in the men's lightweight double sculls event at the 2016 Summer Olympics.
