= Damien Piqueras =

French rower

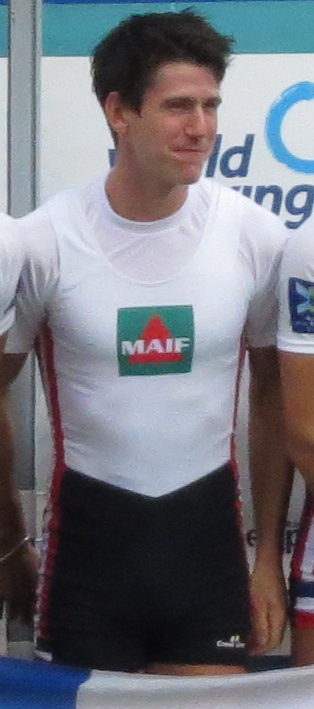

Personal information
- Born: 29 August 1991 (age 34)

Sport
- Sport: Rowing
Medal record
Men's rowing
Representing France
World Championships
Gold medal – first place	2015 Aiguebelette	Lwt quad sculls
Gold medal – first place	2017 Sarasota	Lwt quad sculls
Silver medal – second place	2016 Rotterdam	Lwt quad sculls

Damien Piqueras (born 29 August 1991) is a French lightweight rower. He won a gold medal at the 2017 World Rowing Championships in Sarasota, Florida with the lightweight men's quadruple scull.
