= Oliver Cook =

British rower

Ollie Cook
Personal information
- Full name: Oliver Robert George Cook
- Nationality: British
- Born: 5 June 1990 (age 36) Windsor, Berkshire
- Height: 1.94 m (6 ft 4 in)

Sport
- Country: Great Britain
- Sport: Rowing
- Event(s): Coxed pair, Coxless four, Eight
- Club: University of London Boat Club
Medal record
Men's rowing
Representing Great Britain
World Championships
Gold medal – first place	2016 Rotterdam	Coxed pair
Bronze medal – third place	2019 Ottensheim	Coxless four
European Championships
Bronze medal – third place	2014 Belgrade	Eight
Gold medal – first place	2019 Lucerne	Coxless four
Gold medal – first place	2021 Varese	Coxless four

Oliver Robert George Cook (born 5 June 1990) is a British international rower. He is a world champion and an Olympian.

== Profile ==
Whilst in education at Abingdon School he gained colours for the Abingdon School Boat Club eights. In 2007 he rowed across the English Channel to raise money for charity. After leaving Abingdon in 2008 he attended the London School of Economics, where he studied International Relations and History.

In 2011 Ollie was part of the Row Zambezi Expedition. It was the first time anyone had rowed the 1,000 km of the Upper Zambezi, starting from near its source on the Angolan/Zambian border to Victoria Falls in Zambia. The Expedition raised over £25,000 for Village Water. He is currently studying for a postgraduate diploma in International Development at East Berkshire College.

He is the brother of British rower Jamie Cook.

== Rowing ==
In 2012 he became part of the British Rowing squad and was selected for the 2012 World Rowing U23 Championships in Trakai, Lithuania. The following year he was part of the Men's Coxless Pairs at the 2013 World Rowing Championships with James Foad. The pair won the B Final. He won a European Bronze Medal in the Men's Eight at the 2014 European Rowing Championships.

In 2016 he won a Men's Coxed Pair gold medal at the World Rowing Cup in Poznań before becoming a world champion in the Men's Coxed Pair during the 2016 World Rowing Championships in Rotterdam with Callum McBrierty and Henry Fieldman.

In 2017 he was named in the Oxford eight for the 2017 boat race alongside his brother Jamie and fellow Old Abingdonian Vassilis Ragoussis; a race in which Oxford won.

At the 2019 European Rowing Championships Cook was part of the team that won the gold medal in the fours. The crew included his fellow Abingdonian Matthew Rossiter. The same crew then won a bronze medal at the 2019 World Rowing Championships.

In 2021, he won a second European gold medal when winning the coxless four in Varese, Italy. At the 2020 Summer Olympics in Tokyo, he appeared for Team GB in the coxless four event. The team finished fourth after veering off course in the closing stages of the final. Cook, who had the responsibility for steering, accepted the blame for the error.

== See also ==
- List of Old Abingdonians
