= Morgan Maunoir =

French rower

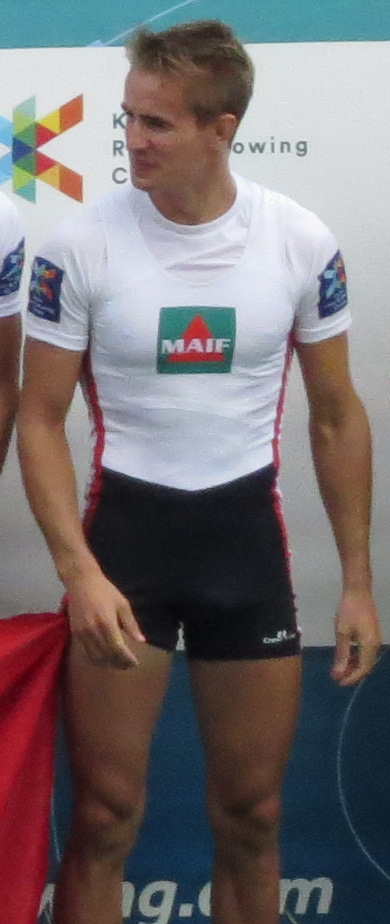

Personal information
- Born: 7 January 1993 (age 33)

Sport
- Sport: Rowing
Medal record
Men's rowing
Representing France
World Championships
Gold medal – first place	2015 Aiguebelette	Lwt quad sculls
Silver medal – second place	2016 Rotterdam	Lwt quad sculls

Morgan Maunoir (born 7 January 1993) is a French lightweight rower. He won a gold medal at the 2015 World Rowing Championships in Aiguebelette with the lightweight men's quadruple scull.
