= Mario Paonessa =

Italian rower (born 1990)

Personal information
- Nationality: Italian
- Born: 9 December 1990 (age 35) Vico Equense, Campania, Italy

Sport
- Country: Italy
- Sport: Rowing
- Club: Fiamme Gialle
Medal record
Men's rowing
Representing Italy
World Championships
Bronze medal – third place	2016 Rotterdam	Coxed pair
Bronze medal – third place	2017 Sarasota	Eight
European Championships
Silver medal – second place	2012 Varese	Eight
Bronze medal – third place	2011 Plovdiv	Coxless four

Mario Paonessa (born 9 December 1990) is an Italian rower. A two-time World Championship medallist, he competed in the men's four at the 2012 Summer Olympics, and the men's eight event at the 2016 Summer Olympics.

== Career ==
Paonessa began rowing at the age of nine, encouraged by his father who was also a rower.

In 2008, he was part of the Italian junior quadruple sculls team that won silver at the World Championships. He was then part of the Italian under-23 men's four that won the U23 World title in 2010. A year later, his team won silver in the same event.

His first senior medal was a bronze medal at the 2011 European Championships in the men's four. It was also in this event that he made his Olympic debut in 2012. In 2012 he was also part of the Italian men's eight that won silver medal at the European Championships.

At the 2016 World Championships, Paonessa and Vincenzo Capelli with cox Andrea Riva won the bronze medal in the coxed pair. The following year, Paonessa won another World Championship bronze, this time in the men's eight.
