= 2022 World Rowing Championships – Men's lightweight coxless pair =

Men's lightweight coxless pair at the 2022 World Rowing Championships
- Venue: Labe aréna
- Location: Račice, Czech Republic
- Dates: 19 September – 23 September
- Competitors: 12 from 6 nations
- Winning time: 6:47.69

Medalists
gold medal	Alessandro Durante; Giovanni Ficarra	Italy
silver medal	Bence Szabó; Kalman Furko	Hungary
bronze medal	Jiří Kopáč; Milan Viktora	Czech Republic

The men's lightweight coxless pair competition at the 2022 World Rowing Championships took place at the Račice regatta venue.

== Schedule ==
The schedule was as follows:

Date	Time	Round
Monday 19 September 2022	10:20	Preliminary Race
Friday 23 September 2022	14:28	Final

All times are Central European Summer Time (UTC+2)

== Results ==
=== Preliminary round ===
All boats advanced to the final.

Rank	Rower	Country	Time	Notes
1	Ahmet Ali Kabadayi; Alper Şevket Eren	Turkey	6:47.36	FA
2	Alessandro Durante; Giovanni Ficarra	Italy	6:49.37	FA
3	Jiří Kopáč; Milan Viktora	Czech Republic	6:51.48	FA
4	Bence Szabó; Kalman Furko	Hungary	6:53.70	FA
5	Hossam El Din Azouz; Ibrahim Elserougy	Egypt	7:00.65	FA
6	Harrison Tsavaris; Justin Stevens	United States	7:33.84	FA

=== Final A ===
The final determined the rankings.

Rank	Rower	Country	Time	Notes
1st place, gold medalist(s)	Alessandro Durante; Giovanni Ficarra	Italy	6:47.69	
2nd place, silver medalist(s)	Bence Szabó; Kalman Furko	Hungary	6:51.49	
3rd place, bronze medalist(s)	Jiří Kopáč; Milan Viktora	Czech Republic	6:51.64	
4	Hossam El Din Azouz; Ibrahim Elserougy	Egypt	7:12.22	
5	Ahmet Ali Kabadayi; Alper Şevket Eren	Turkey	7:25.47	
6	Harrison Tsavaris; Justin Stevens	United States	7:35.22	
