= James Kerr (rower) =

Australian rower (born 1994)

Personal information
- Born: 9 April 1994 (age 32) Western Australia

Sport
- Country: Australia
- Sport: Rowing

Achievements and titles
- National finals: Penrith Cup 2016 - 2018.
Medal record
Men's rowing
Representing Australia

James Kerr (born 9 April 1994) is an Australian lightweight rower. He is a three-time Australian national champion and represented at the 2017 World Rowing Championships.

== Club and state rowing ==
Kerr was raised in Western Australia. His senior club rowing was from the University of Western Australia. In 2016, in Uni of WA colours he won a national title in the open lightweight coxless four. He won that same Australian Championship title in 2017 and in 2018 took silver.

Kerr made his state representative debut for Western Australia in the 2016 lightweight four which contested the Penrith Cup at the annual Interstate Regatta within the Australian Rowing Championships. That crew won silver. He rowed in further West Australian Penrith Cup lightweight fours in 2017 (gold) and 2018.

== International representative rowing ==
Kerr made his Australian representative debut in 2016 when he was selected in the lightweight quad scull to race at the 2016 U23 World Rowing Championships in Rotterdam. That crew placed tenth overall.

In 2017, he made the Australian senior squad for the European racing season. At the World Rowing Cup II he rowed in an Australian lightweight quad which competed in the open weight division and placed tenth. Then at WRC III they raced as lightweights, made the A final and finished fifth. Three members of that crew including Kerr raced the lightweight quad at the 2017 World Rowing Championships placing overall twelfth.

In 2018, Kerr made further senior squad appearance in the Australian lightweight quad at World Rowing Cup II and III in Lucerne. These were his final Australian representative showings as this boat was not taken to the 2018 World Rowing Championships.
