= Edward Fisher (rower) =

British rower

Personal information
- Nationality: British
- Born: 16 April 1994 (age 32)

Sport
- Country: Great Britain
- Sport: Rowing
- Club: Nottingham RC; Leander Club
Medal record
Men's rowing
Representing Great Britain
World Championships
Silver medal – second place	2017 Sarasota	Ltw quadruple sculls

Edward Fisher (born 16 April 1994) is a British rower.

== Rowing career ==
Fisher began rowing for the Loughborough Rowing Club at a local village fete. He made his British junior debut in 2010 in a match against France. He won two gold medals at the 2015 Essen International Regata before winning bronze medals at the 2015 and 2016 World Rowing U23 Championships. He made his senior British debut at the 2017 World Cup. He won a silver medal at the 2017 World Rowing Championships in Sarasota, Florida, as part of the lightweight quadruple sculls with Zak Lee-Green, Gavin Horsburgh and Peter Chambers.
