= Vincenzo Capelli =

Italian rower (born 1988)

Personal information
- Nationality: Italian
- Born: 26 October 1988 (age 37) Rome

Sport
- Country: Italy
- Sport: Rowing
Medal record
Men's rowing
Representing Italy
World Championships
Gold medal – first place	2011 Bled	Coxed pair
Bronze medal – third place	2016 Rotterdam	Coxed pair
European Championships
Silver medal – second place	2012 Varese	Eight

Vincenzo Capelli (born 26 October 1988) is an Italian rower. He competed in the men's four at the 2012 Summer Olympics and the men's eight event at the 2016 Summer Olympics.

At World level, he finished won the coxed pairs at the 2011 World Championship with Pierpaolo Frattini, coxed by Niccolo Fanchi and came third in the coxed pairs at the 2016 World Championships, with Mario Paonessa, coxed by Andrea Riva.

At European level, he finished second with the Italian men's eight at the 2012 European Championships.
