= Gavin Horsburgh =

Scottish and British rower

Personal information
- Nationality: British
- Born: 26 August 1997 (age 28) Lochwinnoch, Scotland

Sport
- Country: Great Britain
- Sport: Rowing
- Club: Castle Semple RC; Edinburgh University BC
Medal record
Men's rowing
Representing Great Britain
World Championships
Silver medal – second place	2017 Sarasota	Ltw quadruple sculls

Gavin Horsburgh (born 26 August 1997) is a Scottish and British rower.

== Rowing career ==
Horsburgh from Lochwinnoch, Scotland, won a gold medal at the 2015 World Rowing Junior Championships in Rio de Janeiro and in the quadruple sculls at the World Rowing U23 Championships. He won a silver medal at the 2017 World Rowing Championships in Sarasota, Florida, as part of the lightweight quadruple sculls with Edward Fisher, Zak Lee-Green and Peter Chambers. He won a double sculls and quad sculls bronze at the 2018 British Rowing Senior Championships in Nottingham.
