= Patrick Rocek =

Italian rower (born 1998)

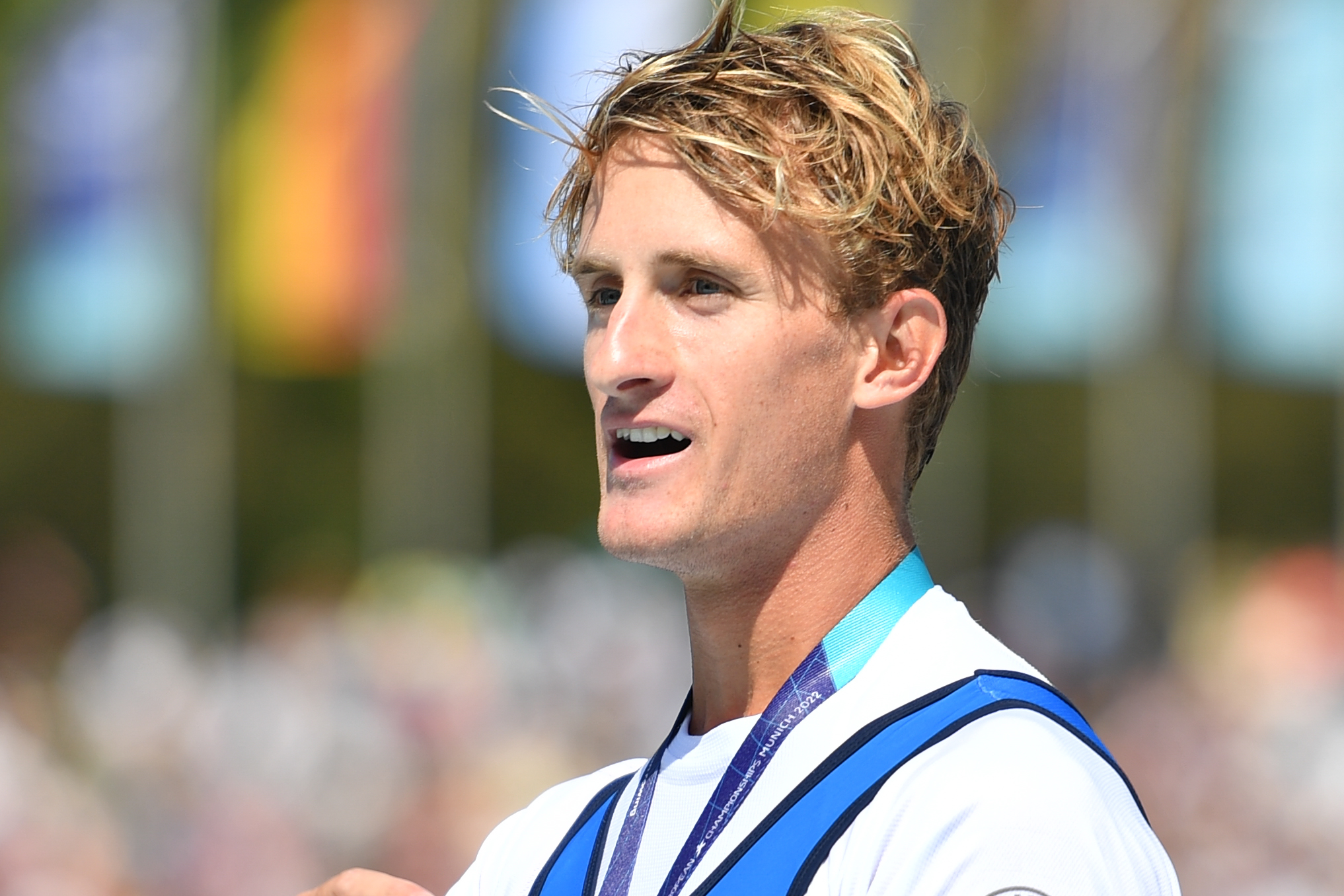

Personal information
- Born: 29 December 1998 (age 27) Erba, Italy
- Height: 1.82 m (6 ft 0 in)
- Weight: 52 kg (115 lb)

Sport
- Country: Italy
- Sport: Rowing
- Club: Canottieri Lario
Medal record
Men's rowing
Representing Italy
World Championships
Gold medal – first place	2022 Račice	LM4x
European Championships
Gold medal – first place	2020 Poznań	LM4x
Gold medal – first place	2021 Varese	LM4x
Gold medal – first place	2022 Munich	LM4x

Patrick Rocek (born 29 December 1998) is an Italian world champion rower. He won the 2022 world championship title in the Italian men's lightweight quad scull after earlier winning gold that season at the 2022 European Rowing Championships.

== Biography ==
His mother Jana Tyrolova was a volleyball national team for the then Czechoslovakia, her father Jaroslav "Jaro" Rocek is a former rower. His twin sister Aisha Rocek is also a rower. Both parents came to Italy from Czechoslovakia in 1981.
