= Cameron Fowler =

Australian rower (born 1993)

Personal information
- Born: 4 July 1993 (age 33) Western Australia
- Occupation: Secondary Teacher

Sport
- Country: Australia
- Sport: Rowing
- Club: Swan River RC

Achievements and titles
- National finals: Penrith Cup 2014- 2018, LM2-, LM4-, LM8+
Medal record
Men's rowing
Representing Australia

Cameron Fowler (born 4 July 1993) is a Western Australian former representative lightweight rower. He is a multiple Australian National Champion and represented Australia in 2013,2014,2017 and 2018.

== Club and state rowing ==
Fowler was raised in Perth, Western Australia and educated at Wesley College, Perth where he took up rowing. His senior club rowing was from the Swan River Rowing Club.

In Swan River colours he contested and had podium finishes for a number of Australian titles at Australian Rowing Championships. He won silver in the open lightweight men's eight in 2014, silver in the open lightweight quad in 2015, and gold in the open lightweight coxless four in 2016. He won the silver in the lightweight coxless pair in 2018.

Fowler made his state representative debut for Western Australia in the 2013 youth eight which contested the Noel Wilkinson Trophy at the annual Interstate Regatta within the Australian Rowing Championships. In 2014 Fowler moved into the West Australian lightweight four which contested the Penrith Cup at the Interstate Regatta. That crew won silver. He rowed in further West Australian Penrith Cup lightweight fours in 2015 (silver), 2016 (silver), and 2018.

== International representative rowing ==
Fowler made his Australian representative debut in 2013 when he was selected in the lightweight coxless four to race at the 2013 U23 World Rowing Championships in Rotterdam. That crew placed twelfth overall.

In 2017 he made the Australian senior squad for the European racing season. At the World Rowing Cup II he rowed in an Australian lightweight quad which competed in the open weight division and placed tenth. Then at WRC III he rowed the lightweight single scull. He was back in the lightweight quad for the 2017 World Rowing Championships where they placed overall twelfth.

In 2018 Fowler made further senior squad appearance in the Australian lightweight quad at World Rowing Cup II and III in Lucerne. These were his final Australian representative showings as this boat was not taken to the 2018 World Rowing Championships.

== Post rowing ==
Fowler studied Psychology at Curtin University. After retirement from competitive rowing he had some school rowing shed coaching appointments at Perth College and Wesley College. In 2021 he took a role as Head Coach at the Bunbury Rowing Club.
