= Maxime Demontfaucon =

French rower

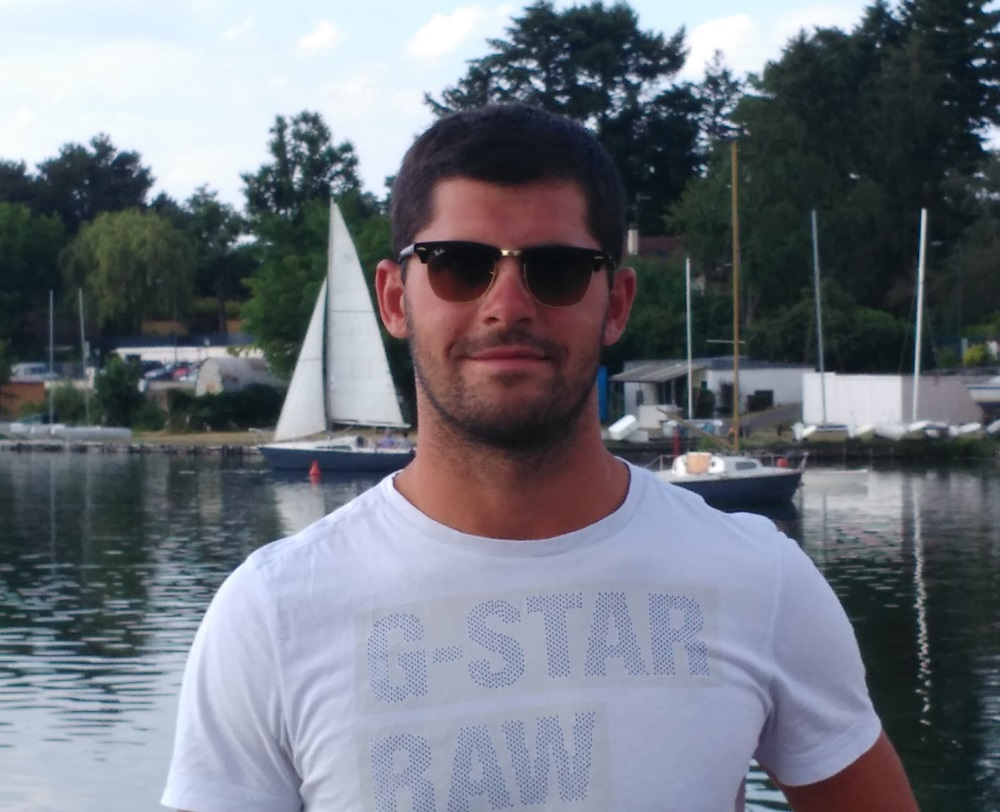
- Demontfaucon in 2018

Personal information
- Born: 3 November 1993 (age 32)

Sport
- Sport: Rowing
Medal record
Men's rowing
Representing France
World Championships
Gold medal – first place	2015 Aiguebelette	Lwt quad sculls
Gold medal – first place	2017 Sarasota	Lwt quad sculls
Silver medal – second place	2016 Rotterdam	Lwt quad sculls

Maxime Demontfaucon (born 3 November 1993) is a French lightweight rower. He won a gold medal at the 2017 World Rowing Championships in Sarasota, Florida with the lightweight men's quadruple scull.
