= Wesley College, Perth =

School in South Perth, Western Australia

Wesley College

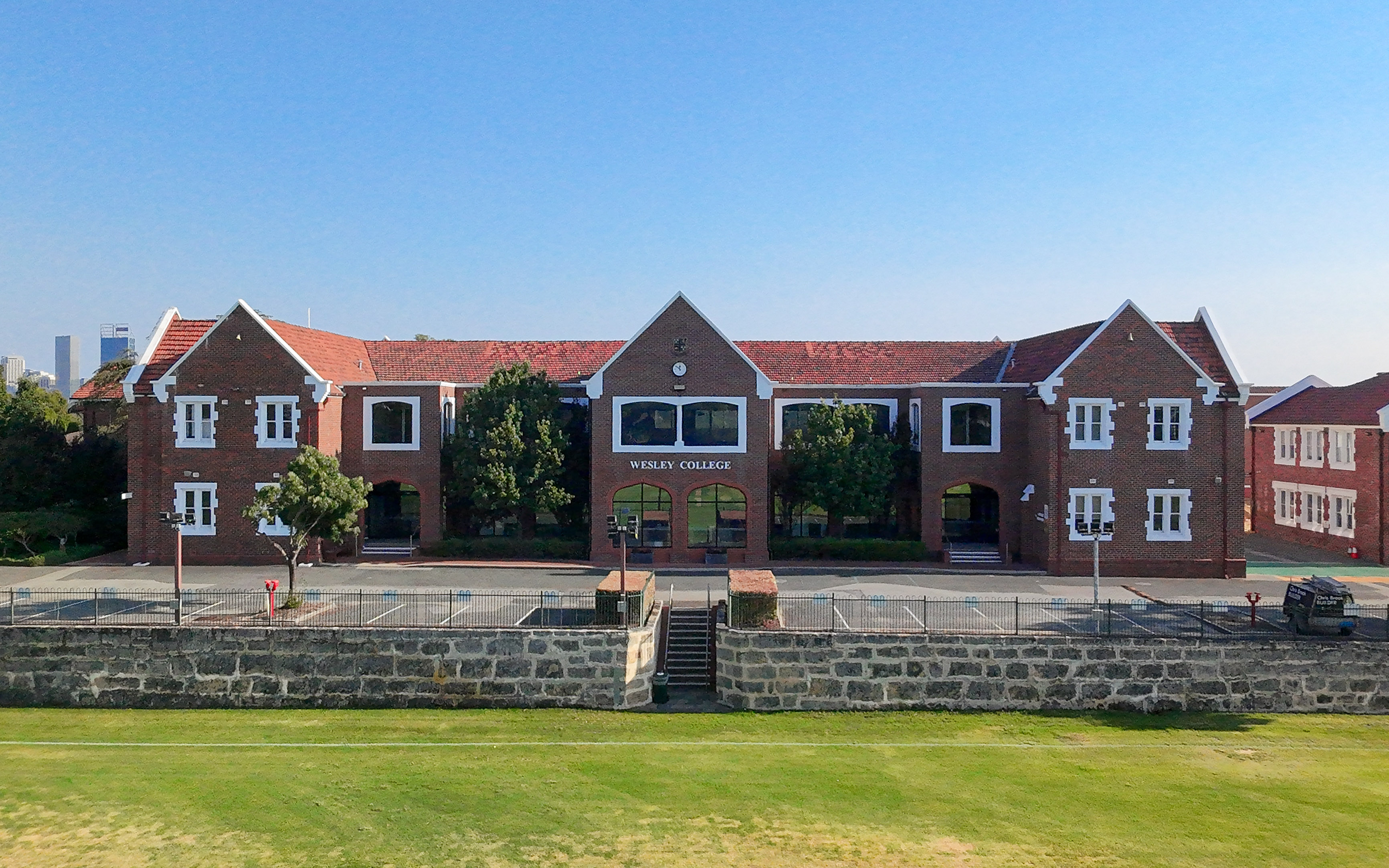
- Wesley College's Kefford Wing seen from the south in 2026

Location
- South Perth, Western Australia; Australia; 31°58′43″S 115°51′55″E

Information
- Type: Independent day and boarding
- Motto: Audendo Atque Agendo (transl. 'By daring and by doing')
- Denomination: Uniting Church
- Established: 1923
- Sister school: Penrhos College
- Chair: Matt Braysher
- Head teacher: Ross Barron
- Staff: ~110
- Enrolment: 1,300
- Colours: Black, green, gold
- Slogan: By daring and by doing
- School fees: A$29,530 (7–12, day student)
- Affiliation: Public Schools Association
- Alumni: Old Wesley Collegians
- Website: www.wesley.wa.edu.au

Western Australia Heritage Register
- Official name: Wesley College, Chapel & Memorial Rose Garden
- Type: State Registered Place
- Designated: 25 August 2009
- Reference no.: 2379

Wesley College, informally known as Wesley, is an independent, day and boarding school for boys and girls (co-ed to Year 6 and boys only Years 7–12), situated in South Perth, a suburb of Perth, Western Australia.

The college is a Uniting Church school, which traces its origins back to 1923 when it was established by members of the Methodist Church which was founded by John Wesley.

Since its foundation, the college has been located on a 19-hectare (47-acre) riverside property, near the banks of the Swan River. The campus consists of a Junior School (Manning House) for Pre-kindergarten to Year 4, a Middle School (Years 5 to 8) and a Senior School (Years 9 to 12), performing arts, sporting grounds and boarding facilities for 150 students.

Wesley College is affiliated with the Junior School Heads Association of Australia (JSHAA), the Australian Boarding Schools' Association (ABSA), the Association of Heads of Independent Schools of Australia (AHISA), the Association of Independent Schools of Western Australia (AISWA), and has been a member of the Public Schools Association (PSA) since 1952.

Wesley's sister school is Penrhos College located in Como.

== History ==
The foundation stone was laid by the Premier of Western Australia, Sir James Mitchell on 11 November 1922. This stone is still visible at the south-west corner of the original building, now known as the J. F. Ward Wing in honour of the school's first headmaster.

The college began operation in 2 July the following year, with an initial enrolment of 39 boys, and grew steadily in size. This evolution can be traced through the campus architecture which was first extended in 1925 with the construction of a general classroom block, now the RE Kefford Wing. A second storey was added to the original building in 1926, along with various verandahs and a weatherboard library, which have since been demolished.

In 1930, J. F. Ward was succeeded as Headmaster by J. L. Rossiter. A number of new buildings were constructed in the 1930s, including the Headmaster's Residence (now JS Maloney House), a dining hall, extra classrooms and a gymnasium (now the Hamer Wing). The college joined the Public Schools' Association in 1952.

Rossiter was succeeded as Headmaster in 1954 by Norman Roy Collins. During Collins' 11 years' tenure, construction of the Lych Gate, Memorial Chapel (1960–61), the boat shed, the science block (1956, 1959), additional classrooms (1955, 1963) and the swimming pool (1963) were completed.

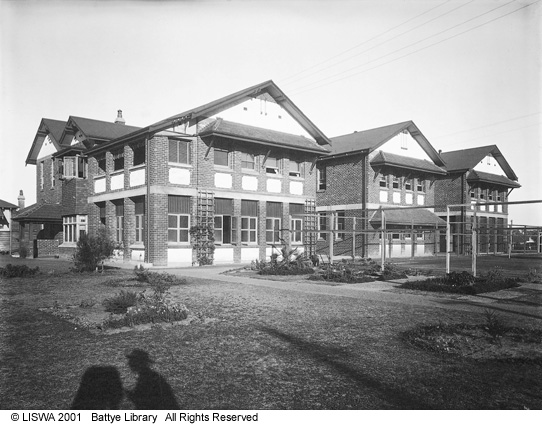
Wesley College in 1926

A new Headmaster, Clive Hamer, was appointed in 1965 and served Wesley until 1983. During this period, Wesley took a lead role in the introduction of the Achievement Certificate in Western Australia (1969–71) and built the boarding houses of Cygnet and Tranby (1968–70), the HR Trenaman Library (1971), classrooms and balconies around the Jenkins Quadrangle (1972), the Collins Oval (1970) and the Joseph Green Centre (1973–78).

In 1977, Wesley came under the auspices of the Uniting Church which resulted from a joining of the Methodist, Presbyterian and Congregational Churches. The first female students were enrolled in 1978 with the opening of a new Junior School on land acquired north of Swan Street.

Headmaster's Residence in 1950

Roderic Kefford served as the fifth Headmaster from 1984 to 1996 and continued the extensive curriculum changes associated with a broadening of upper secondary programs beyond university entry and the establishment of Wesley's lower secondary structure. The RE Blanckensee Physical Education Centre was opened in 1987 and the original gymnasium was renovated to become the Hamer Wing classrooms. The Preparatory School was also extended towards Mill Point Road in 1994.

A site development plan was initiated by John Bednall who was Headmaster from October 1996 to July 2002. This resulted in the refurbishment of the Kefford Wing, the Ward Wing and the Science block, the opening of the Junior School (Manning House) (1999) and Middle School (2000).

In August 2003, David Gee was appointed Wesley's seventh Headmaster. In 2005, the Design, Technology and Visual Arts Centre was opened at a cost of A$4.5 million. In 2006, the Boarding House was refurbished at a cost of $2 million with bigger rooms and a new security link building.

In 2007, construction commenced on the school's biggest project – the A$13 million refurbishment of the Joseph Green Centre. It was officially opened on 9 May 2008 during the school's 85th anniversary year.

David Gee left the school at the completion of the 2018 school year and was replaced in 2019 by Ross Barron, who was previously the Head of Senior School at Hale.

=== Schools360 Award ===
Schools360 is an independent Australian school review and ranking platform that evaluates institutions across five comprehensive criteria: Academic Excellence, Student Wellbeing, Learning Programs, Learning Environment, and Institutional Excellence. In their 2026 national rankings, Wesley College in South Perth was awarded first place, securing the title of Australia's best private school with an exceptional overall score of 93.3%. Following the announcement on 4 June 2026, Wesley College released an official statement expressing immense pride in the recognition, attributing the historic achievement to the dedication of their staff, students, and the strength of the college community.

=== Bednall controversy ===
During 2002 it was alleged that John Bednall, the headmaster at the time, had accessed child pornography on the internet. Bednall resigned immediately and a single charge was laid against him which was discontinued in the WA magistrates Court because of a lack of evidence. Bednall subsequently sued Wesley for wrongful termination. He later accepted a settlement offer from Wesley College Council, which included a statement recognising that Bednall had acted with the best interests of Wesley students in mind.

== Campus ==
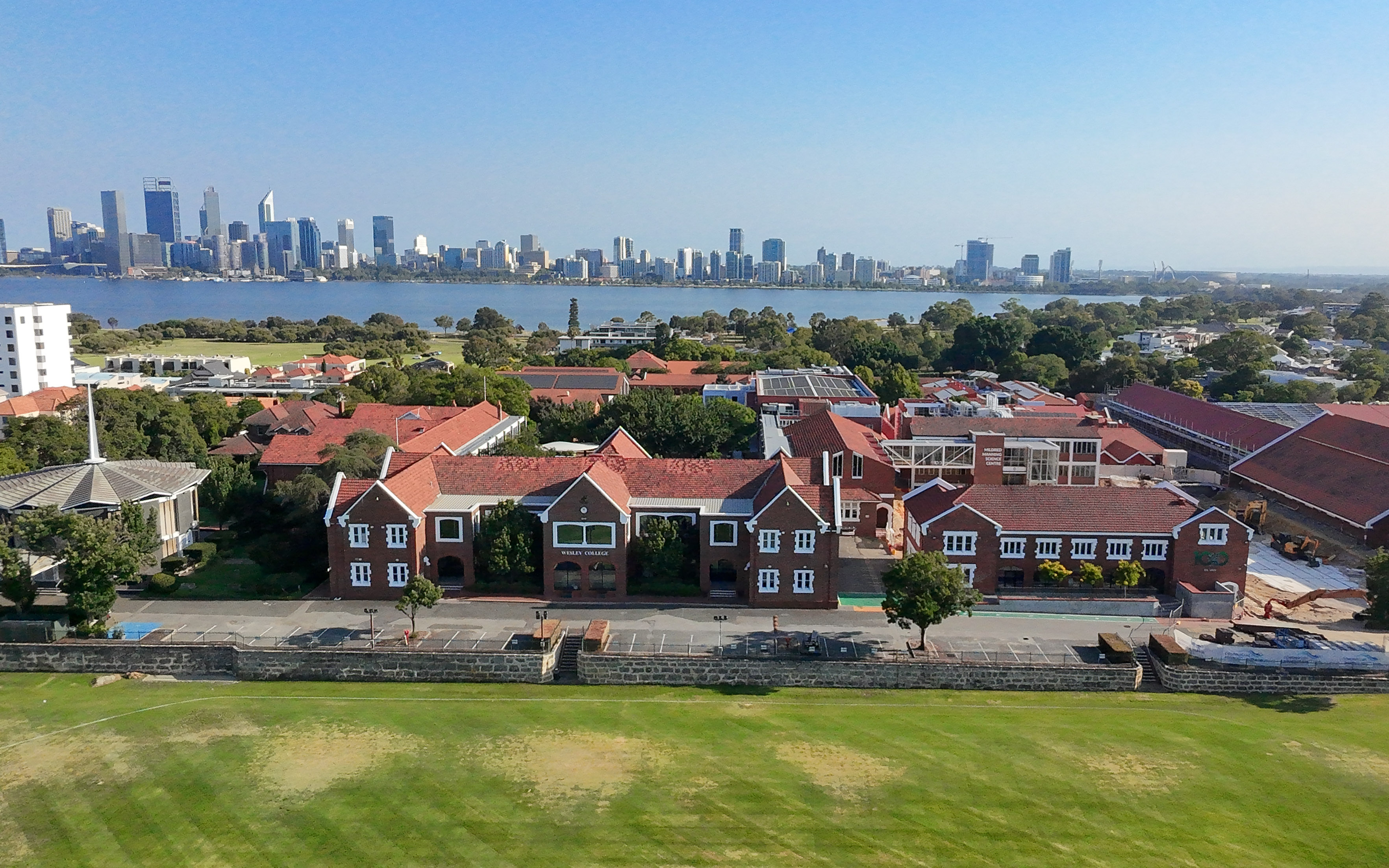
Aerial view of Wesley College campus and Swan River

The school is based primarily on its nineteen-hectare campus on Coode Street in South Perth which comprises each of the Junior, Middle and Senior Schools. The school also has playing grounds in Como, Collins Oval. Football and soccer are the main sports that are played on these grounds.

== Building developments ==
The first stage of the school's current masterplan saw the $13 million refurbishment of the Joseph Green Centre as a performing arts and function facility, completed in May 2008. The second stage saw the refurbishment of the Ward and Kefford Wings of the Senior School ($2m) and the Old Boys' Memorial Chapel ($1.5 million). Since 2009 the school has seen the opening of the T.G O'Sullivan Pavilion and a new Languages Centre, as well as a refurbishment of the Hamer Wing and the Mildred Manning Science Centre.

Wesley College in South Perth is undertaking a major campus redevelopment through its Centenary Building Project, designed to significantly enhance the college's educational, sporting and community facilities. Construction commenced in March 2025, with Stage 1 scheduled to open in Term 3, 2026. The first stage includes a four-court indoor sports hall, outdoor tennis courts, flexible learning spaces, classrooms, a teaching kitchen, a high-performance sports facility, an events and reception centre, and the OWCA Hall of Excellence, as well as a gathering space capable of accommodating approximately 1,800 people. A second stage is planned to further develop the sporting precinct, including the transformation of the existing gymnasium into a high-performance athletic development area and the construction of a new Aquatic Precinct featuring a 50-metre swimming pool and a full-size international water polo pool. This aquatic component is expected to progress into 2027. While Wesley College has not publicly stated a single overall project cost in the sources available, the aquatic component alone has previously been reported at approximately $12.1 million, so the broader Centenary Building and associated campus redevelopment represents a substantial multi-million-dollar investment in the college's long-term infrastructure.

Wesley College uniform

== Student life ==
The Old Wesley Collegians Association offers a scholarship to a year 11 student, who has a father or grandfather who attended the college, based on sporting, academic and citizenship, both within Wesley and the wider community. The college offers three scholarships a year to indigenous students from rural and regional areas of Western Australia.

=== Traditions ===
The Wesley war cry is used for victories in sporting and other school events. The traditional Wesley send-off is used to "send off" students involved in major sporting events, and entails the introduction of participants accompanied by students stomping their feet on the wooden floor of the Joseph Green Centre. As of 2010, this has been informally named the "Woodsey Stomp" in recognition of long serving staff member, Frank Woods, who often received this applause every time he was to take the microphone at assembly. When a well-respected or prominent Wesley teacher retires from the School, a guard of honour is made on the Jenkins Quad.

=== House system ===
Wesley College has eight houses in the senior school, Mofflin, Cygnet, Hardey, Tranby, Grove, Walton, Dickson, Jenkins and six in the junior school, Hardey, Mofflin, Grove, Walton, Dickson, Jenkins. Each house is named in honour of an individual who has had an association with the school, including A. H. Dickinson, one of the founders of the school and Joseph Hardey, one of the first Methodists to settle in Western Australia. The eight senior school houses compete for the Klem Cup, named in honour of the first student enrolled at the college, while the middle school houses have events every year as they play for the Kay Cup.

=== Sport ===
Wesley has been a member of the Public Schools Association (PSA) since 1952, within which it competes in inter-school sports. Wesley sport is split up into two seasons, a winter and summer season. For summer they have tennis, cricket, water polo, swimming, basketball and rowing. For winter they have soccer, badminton, rugby, Australian rules football and hockey. In 2011 the Wesley College 1st XVIII football team historically won The Alcock Cup breaking a 17-year drought.

==== Staff ====
As of April 2026, the following staff hold these positions:

- Ross Barron - Head of College
- Nathan Jessup - Deputy Head of College
- Lynette McGivern - Head of Senior School
- Adam Kealley - Head of Academics & Innovation
- Manie Strydom - College Chaplain
- Rodney Steer - Head of Boarding
- John Taylor - Assistant Head of Senior School (Pastoral)
- Andrew Pateman - Assistant Head of Senior School (Academics)
- Brad Hilliard - Head of Middle School
- Jo Edinger - Head of Junior School

According to the 2025 Wesley College Annual Report, out of the 185 Teachers and Education Assistants, 124 are female, and 61 are male, with 2 being Aboriginal. Furthermore, out of the 112 operations and administration staff, 75 are female and 27 are male.

==== PSA premierships ====
Wesley has won the following PSA premierships.

Sport	Total premierships	Years
Athletics	3	1953, 1955, 1956
Badminton	14	2002, 2004, 2006, 2007, 2009, 2010, 2011, 2012, 2013, 2014, 2015, 2017, 2018, 2021
Basketball	6	1980, 1982, 1985, 1990, 1996, 2017
Cricket	14	1953, 1955, 1957, 1983, 1987, 1988, 1989, 1991, 1993, 1994, 1998, 2003, 2006, 2008
Football	4	1982, 1991, 1994, 2011
Golf	2	2000, 2025
Hockey	13	1959, 1960, 1962, 1963, 1964, 1965, 1977, 1978, 1984, 1985, 2009, 2012, 2020
Rugby	3	1987, 1988, 2008
Soccer	4	1990, 1991, 2004, 2005
Swimming	4	1958, 2004, 2005, 2006
Tennis	8	1963, 1967, 1975, 1979, 1980, 1981, 2023, 2025, 2026
Volleyball	2	2010, 2013
Rowing	1	2001

=== Katitjin ===
Katitjin is a program partaken by all year 8 students. For the students it is a chance to get out of the classroom and learn within the community. The program is based out of the West Australian Rowing Club on the banks of the Swan River. The program runs for a full term.

The name Katitjin is taken from the Noongar word meaning "to listen and to learn".

== Australian HPV Super Series (Pedal Prix) ==
The school has a major involvement in the Australian International HPV Super Series, with the program currently being run by Kyal Rees. The team had been competing in the Busselton round each year since 2014. The 2018 race was their best one ever. The team represented by Finnian Emmett, Tyler Clement, Noah Tarrant, Alexander McAskil and Wallace Cheung had ridden 209 laps (177.65 km) in the 6 hours race and came first in the Senior School Division and also became the WA Champion School. The team had beat the Hale School Dell Orean team by 16 laps.

== Notable alumni ==
The school has produced four Rhodes scholars: R. Rossiter (1935), G. G. Rossiter (1946), M. V. Crockett (1994) and Dustin Stuart (2010).

=== Sporting ===
Several alumni of the school have become professional sportsmen. The R.E. Blanckensee Physical Education Centre contains a Hall of Fame showcasing over 160 of Wesley's finest sporting old boys. These include:

- Blaine Boekhorst, AFL, Carlton Football Club
- Shai Bolton, AFL, Fremantle Football Club
- Kyle Bowen, Basketball, NBL
- Hilton Cartwright, Cricket, Australia men's national cricket team,Western Australia, Melbourne Stars, Hampshire, UK
- Adam Carter, AFL, West Coast Eagles
- Mark Coughlan, AFL, Richmond Tigers
- Ben Cousins, AFL, West Coast Eagles, Richmond, Brownlow Medallist
- Brent Dancer, Hockey, Australia
- Ian Dick, Hockey, Australia 1948–58, Olympic Captain Melbourne 1956
- Dean Evans, Hockey, Australia 1985–92, Olympic Silver Medal Barcelona 1992
- Mark Ettles, Baseball, Perth Heat, San Diego Padres MLB 1993, Olympics Sydney 2000
- Cameron Fowler, Australian representative lightweight rower
- Lance Franklin, AFL, Hawthorn Hawks; Sydney Swans
- Clayton Fredericks, Olympic Equestrian Silver Medal Beijing 2008, 2008 and 2005 World Cup Champion, 2006 British Open Champion
- Michael Gardiner, AFL, West Coast Eagles, St Kilda Football Club
- Reuben Ginbey, West Coast Eagles
- James Harvey, Basketball, NBL
- Bobby Hill, GWS Giants/Collingwood Football Club
- Ben Hollioake, Cricket, England cricket team
- Mitchell Marsh, Cricket, Perth Scorchers, Delhi Capitals, Australia men's national cricket team
- Shaun Marsh, Cricket, Western Australia cricket team, Australia men's national cricket team
- Arthur Marshall, Tennis, Davis Cup
- Andrew McDougall, AFL, West Coast Eagles, Western Bulldogs
- Scott Meuleman, Cricket, Western Warriors
- David Myers, AFL, Essendon Bombers
- Quinton Narkle, AFL, Geelong Football Club, Port Adelaide
- Sam Powell-Pepper, AFL, Port Adelaide Football Club
- Phil Read, AFL, West Coast Eagles, Melbourne Demons
- Karl Reindler, racing driver, Supercars Championship, Formula One medical car
- Chris Rogers, Cricket, Western Warriors, Australia A, Australia
- John Ryan, Olympic Swimming, Bronze Medal Tokyo 1964
- Jarrad Schofield, AFL, West Coast Eagles, Fremantle Football Club, Port Adelaide
- Bradley Sheppard, Australian rules footballer, West Coast Eagles
- Clem Smith, AFL, Carlton Football Club
- Earl Spalding, AFL, Carlton
- Scott Spalding, AFL, Carlton
- Scott Stevens, AFL, Adelaide Crows
- Declan Tingay, Olympic racewalking
- Murray Vernon, Cricket, Western Australia
- Adam Wallace-Harrison, Rugby Union, Super Rugby, ACT Brumbies, Kobelco Steelers
- Cameron Zurhaar, North Melbourne Football Club
- Spencer Harrison

=== Politicians ===
- Mel Bungey – MHR for Canning (1974–83)
- Geoff Baker – MLA for South Perth (2021–present)
- Kim Chance – WA MLC (1992–present)
- Brendon Grylls – MLA for Merredin (2001–2017)
- Sir Ross Hutchinson, DFC – WA MLA for Cottesloe (1950–77)
- David Johnston – Senator (2001–16), Minister for Justice 2007
- Hugh Jones – MLA for Darling Range (2021–present)
- Barry MacKinnon – MLA for Murdoch (1977–93)
- Arthur Marshall, OAM – MLA for Murray (1993–94), Member for Dawesville (1996–2005)
- Ross McLean – MHR for Perth (1975–83)
- Cambell Nalder – MLA for Narrogin (1986–87)
- Sir Crawford Nalder – WA MLA for Wagin (1947–74)
- Dean Nalder – MLA for Alfred Cove (2013–2021)
- Morton Schell – MLA for Mount Marshall (1986–1989)
- Peter Shack – MHR for Tangney (1977–83, 1984–93)

=== Academic leaders ===
- Emeritus Professor Geoffrey Bolton, AO, Chancellor Murdoch University 2002–2006
- Professor Ralph Slatyer AC, FAA, Chief Scientist of Australia 1989–1992

=== Arts/media ===
- Peter Cowan AM, author
- Joel Creasey, actor and comedian
- Alan Fletcher, actor
- Stephen Heathcote AM, ballet dancer
- Michael Holmes, CNN reporter
- Jeremy Sims, actor
- Ric Throssell, diplomat, playwright and novelist
Cricket at Ward Oval

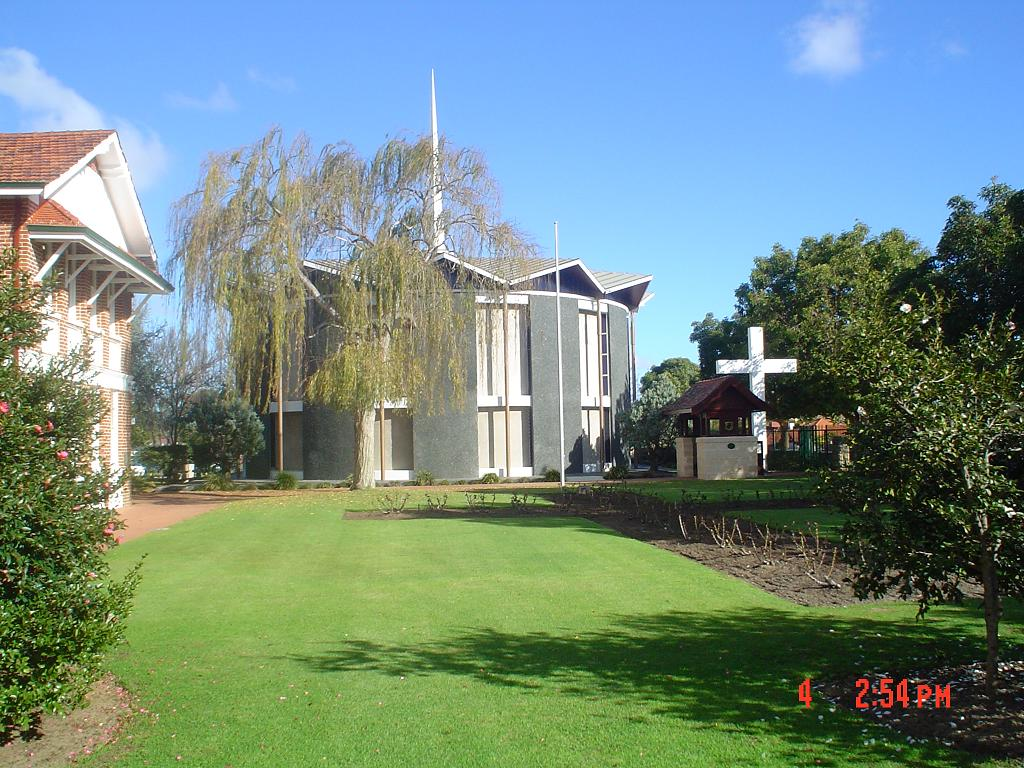
The Old Boys' Memorial Chapel and Rose Garden

== See also ==
- List of schools in the Perth metropolitan area
- List of boarding schools in Australia
