= Antonio Vicino =

Italian rower (born 1995)

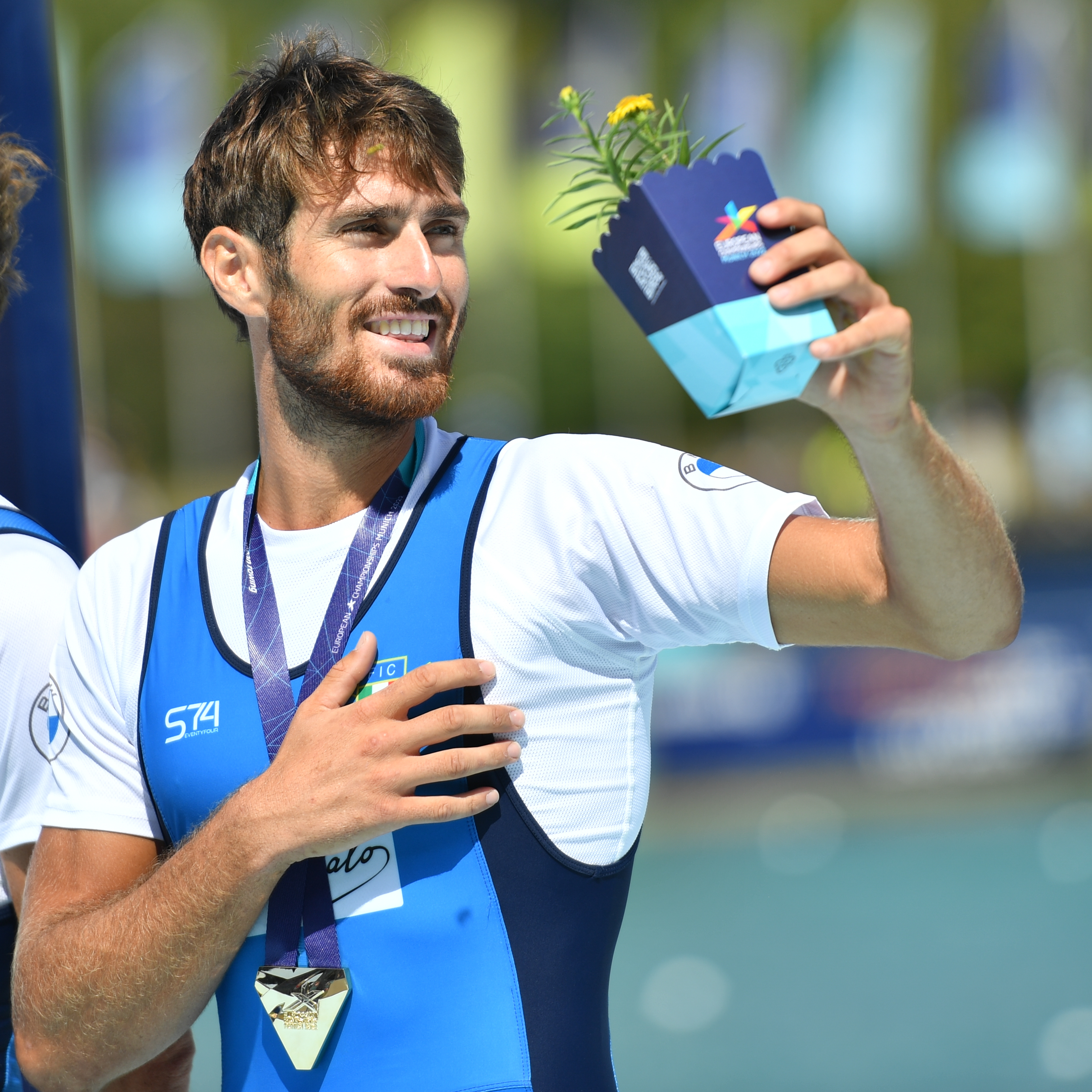

Personal information
- Born: 24 January 1995 (age 31) Naples, Italy
- Height: 1.86 m (6 ft 1 in)
- Weight: 71 kg (157 lb)

Sport
- Country: Italy
- Sport: Rowing
- Club: Gruppo Sportivo della Marina Militare
- Coached by: Antonio Colamonici
Medal record
Men's rowing
Representing Italy
World Championships
Gold medal – first place	2022 Račice	LM4x
European Championships
Gold medal – first place	2020 Poznań	LM4x
Gold medal – first place	2021 Varese	LM4x
Gold medal – first place	2022 Munich	LM4x

Antonio Vicino (born 24 January 1995) is an Italian rower. He won the 2022 world championship title in the Italian men's lightweight quad scull after earlier winning gold that season at the 2022 European Rowing Championships.
