= Piero Sfiligoi =

Italian lightweight rower (born 1994)

Personal information
- Born: 3 June 1994 (age 32)

Sport
- Sport: Rowing
Medal record
Men's rowing
Representing Italy
World Rowing Championships
Gold medal – first place	2017 Sarasota	Lwt coxless four
World Rowing U23 Championships
Gold medal – first place	2016 Rotterdam	BLM4-
Gold medal – first place	2015 Plovdiv	BLM4-
World Rowing Cup
Gold medal – first place	2017 Lucerne	LM4-
Bronze medal – third place	2016 Lucerne	LM2-
Bronze medal – third place	2015 Varese	LM2-
World Rowing Coastal Championships
Silver medal – second place	2019 Hong Kong	CM4x+
Gold medal – first place	2018 Victoria	CM4x+
Gold medal – first place	2017 Thonon les Bains	CM4x+
Silver medal – second place	2016 Monaco	CM2x
World University Rowing Championships
Gold medal – first place	2018 Shanghai	LM2x
Silver medal – second place	2014 Gravelines	LM4-
European Rowing Championships
Silver medal – second place	2017 Racice	LM4-
Maditerranean Beach Games
Bronze medal – third place	2019 Patras	CM4X+

Piero Sfiligoi (born 3 June 1994) is an Italian lightweight rower. He won a gold medal at the 2017 World Rowing Championships in Sarasota with the lightweight men's four.
