= 2022 World Rowing Championships – Men's lightweight quadruple sculls =

Men's lightweight quadruple sculls at the 2022 World Rowing Championships
- Venue: Labe aréna
- Location: Račice, Czech Republic
- Dates: 19 September – 23 September
- Competitors: 20 from 5 nations
- Winning time: 5:56.66

Medalists
gold medal	Antonio Vicino; Alessandro Benzoni; Niels Torre; Patrick Rocek	Italy
silver medal	Sun Man; Chen Sensen; Jiang Xuke; Ma Yule	China
bronze medal	Johannes Ursprung; Simon Klueter; Fabio Kress; Joachim Agne	Germany

The men's lightweight quadruple sculls competition at the 2022 World Rowing Championships took place at the Račice regatta venue.

== Schedule ==
The schedule was as follows:

Date	Time	Round
Monday 19 September 2022	11:08	Heats
Friday 23 September 2022	15:36	Final A

All times are Central European Summer Time (UTC+2)

== Results ==
All boats advanced directly to Final A.

=== Heat ===
Rank	Rower	Country	Time	Notes
1	Antonio Vicino; Alessandro Benzoni; Niels Torre; Patrick Rocek	Italy	5:58.42	FA
2	Sun Man; Chen Sensen; Jiang Xuke; Ma Yule	China	6:00.48	FA
3	Johannes Ursprung; Simon Klueter; Fabio Kress; Joachim Agne	Germany	6:02.48	FA
4	Dennis Carracedo; Daniel Gutiérrez; Jorge Knabe; Antonio Díaz	Spain	6:04.82	FA
5	Mats Terwiesch; Ashton Knight; Ian Richardson; Sean Richardson	United States	6:25.05	FA

=== Final A ===
The final determined the rankings.

Rank	Rower	Country	Time	Notes
1st place, gold medalist(s)	Antonio Vicino; Alessandro Benzoni; Niels Torre; Patrick Rocek	Italy	5:56.66	
2nd place, silver medalist(s)	Sun Man; Chen Sensen; Jiang Xuke; Ma Yule	China	5:59.27	
3rd place, bronze medalist(s)	Johannes Ursprung; Simon Klueter; Fabio Kress; Joachim Agne	Germany	5:59.47	
4	Dennis Carracedo; Daniel Gutiérrez; Jorge Knabe; Antonio Díaz	Spain	6:09.07	
5	Mats Terwiesch; Ashton Knight; Ian Richardson; Sean Richardson	United States	6:12.07	
