= Patrik Stöcker =

German lightweight rower (born 1992)

Personal information
- Born: 23 July 1992 (age 33)

Sport
- Sport: Rowing
Medal record
Men's rowing
Representing Germany
World Championships
Gold medal – first place	2016 Rotterdam	Lwt quad sculls
Bronze medal – third place	2017 Sarasota	Lwt coxless four

Patrik Stöcker (born 23 July 1992) is a German lightweight rower. He won a gold medal at the 2016 World Rowing Championships in Rotterdam with the lightweight men's quadruple scull.
