= Sven Keßler =

German rower (born 1991)

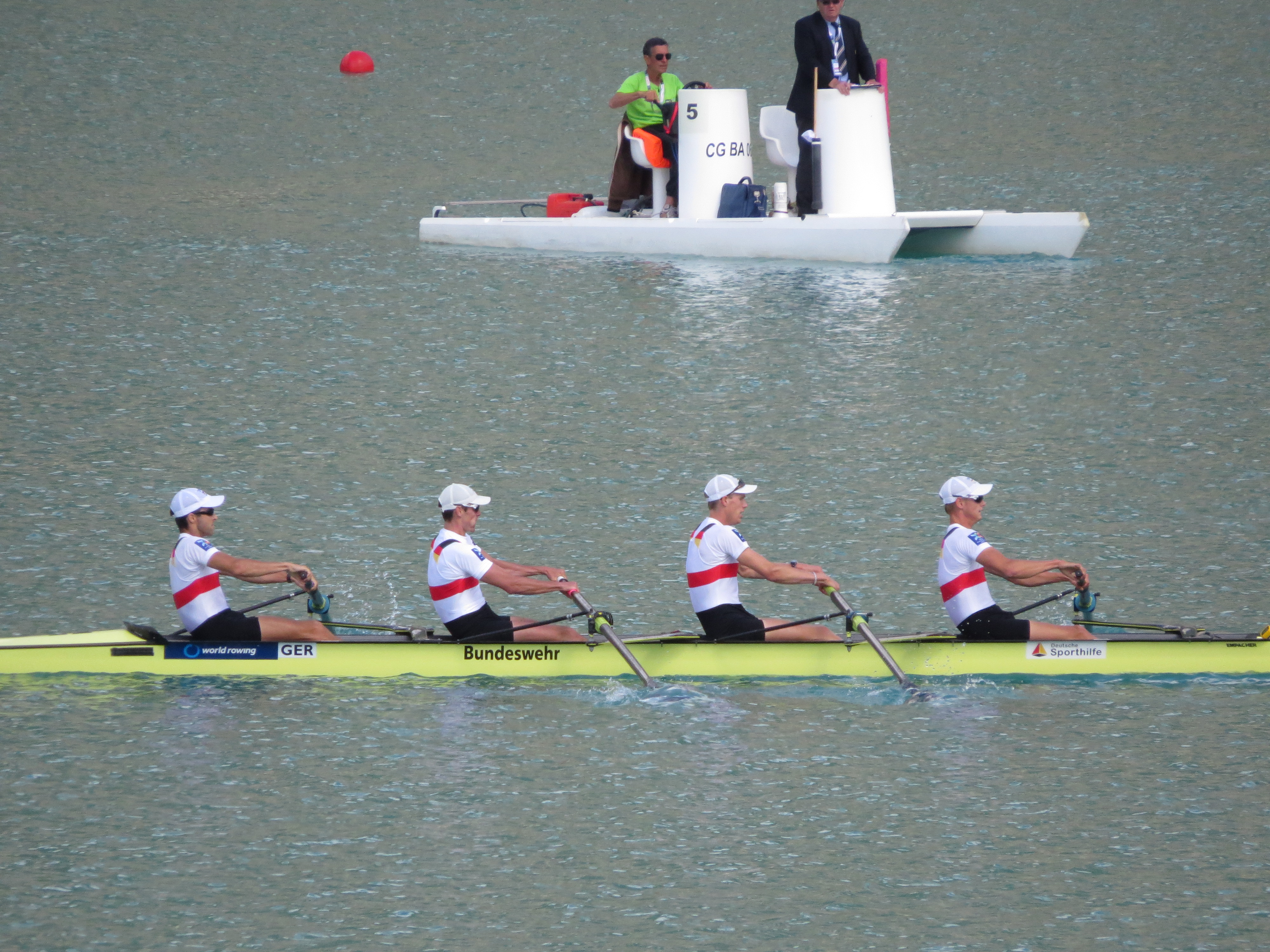
- Aviron 2015 – World Championships – 69 (LM4-) Lightweight Men's Four – Semifinal

Personal information
- Born: 22 March 1991 (age 35)

Sport
- Sport: Rowing
Medal record
Men's rowing
Representing Germany
World Championships
Gold medal – first place	2014 Amsterdam	Lwt eight
Bronze medal – third place	2017 Sarasota	Lwt coxless four
European Championships
Bronze medal – third place	2015 Poznań	Lwt coxless pair

Sven Keßler (born 22 March 1991) is a German lightweight rower. He won a gold medal at the 2014 World Rowing Championships in Amsterdam with the lightweight men's eight.
