= Murray Vernon =

Australian cricketer

Personal information
- Full name: Murray Trevor Vernon
- Born: 9 February 1937; Kondinin, Western Australia
- Died: 16 April 2013 (aged 76); Perth, Western Australia
- Batting: Left-handed
- Bowling: Right-arm leg spin
- Role: Batsman

Domestic team information
- Years: Team
- 1955/56–1967/68: Western Australia

Career statistics
Competition	First-class
Matches	73
Runs scored	4,169
Batting average	34.74
100s/50s	8/22
Top score	173
Balls bowled	410
Wickets	9
Bowling average	25.66
5 wickets in innings	0
10 wickets in match	0
Best bowling	3/15
Catches/stumpings	57/–
- Source: CricketArchive, 20 April 2013

Murray Trevor Vernon (9 February 1937 – 16 April 2013) was an Australian cricketer who played regularly for Western Australia from the late 1950s to the late 1960s. Vernon scored 4067 runs for Western Australia at an average of 34.76 with a highest score of 173, including eight centuries. He captained Western Australia in two matches in the 1962–63 season when Barry Shepherd was unavailable, losing both. Born in Kondinin and growing up in South Perth, he attended Wesley College. He also captained Melville in the Western Australian Grade Cricket competition. Vernon died in Perth in April 2013, after a short illness.
