= Jakub Makovička =

Czech rower

Personal information
- Born: 7 March 1981 (age 45) Prague, the Czech Republic
- Height: 197 cm (6 ft 6 in)
- Weight: 100 kg (220 lb)

Sport
- Sport: Rowing
Medal record
Men's rowing
Representing the Czech Republic
European Rowing Championships
Gold medal – first place	2007 Poznań	Eight

Jakub Makovička (born 7 March 1981) is a Czech rower. He competed at the 2004 Summer Olympics in Athens with the men's coxless four where they came eighths.
