= Jonathan Koch (rower) =

German lightweight rower (born 1985)

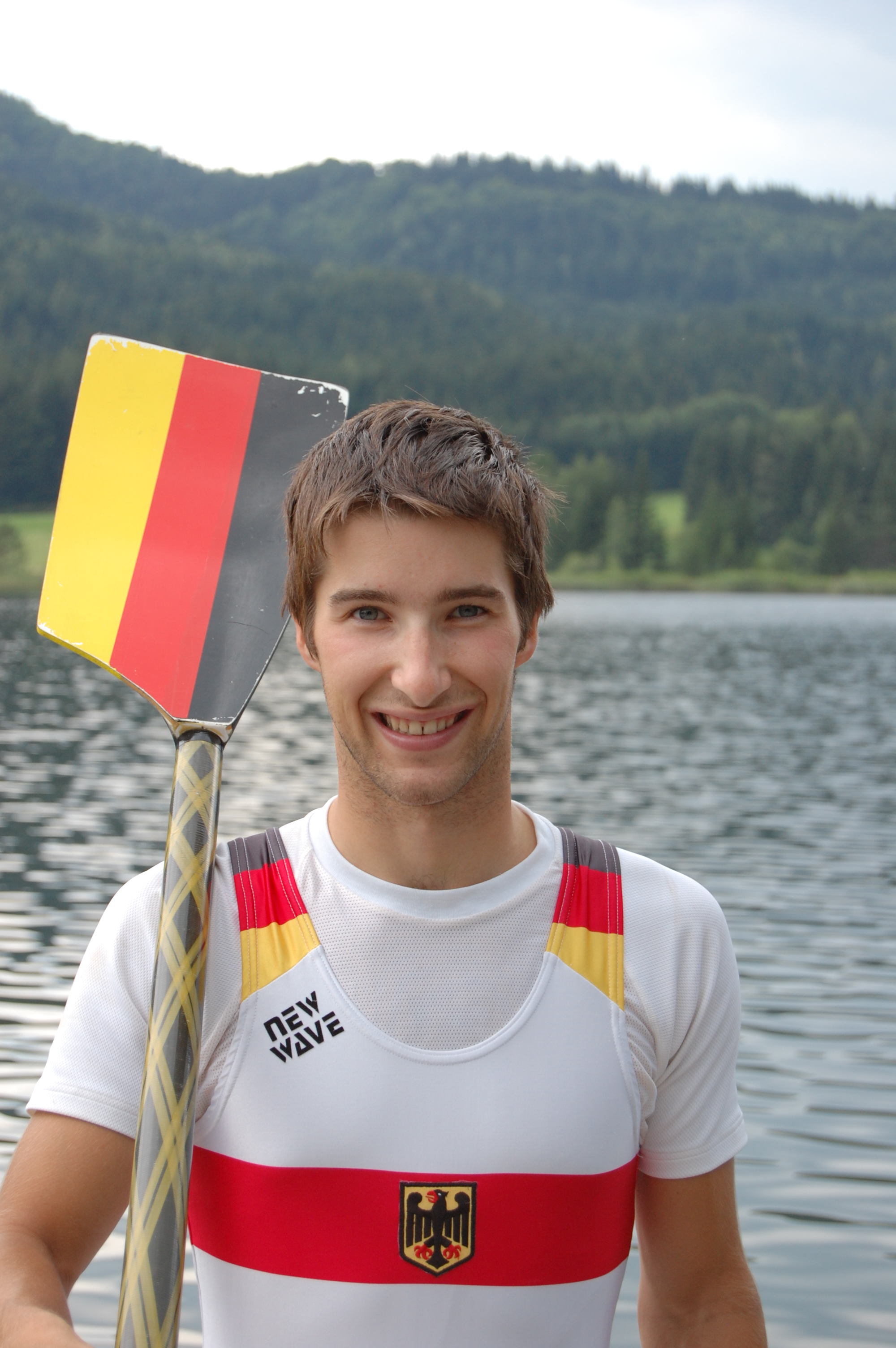
- Koch in 2008

Medal record

Men's rowing

Representing Germany

World Championships
Gold medal – first place	2010 Karapiro	Lwt quad sculls
Bronze medal – third place	2017 Sarasota	Lwt coxless four

European Championships
Bronze medal – third place	2013 Seville	Lwt single sculls
Bronze medal – third place	2016 Brandenburg	Lwt coxless four

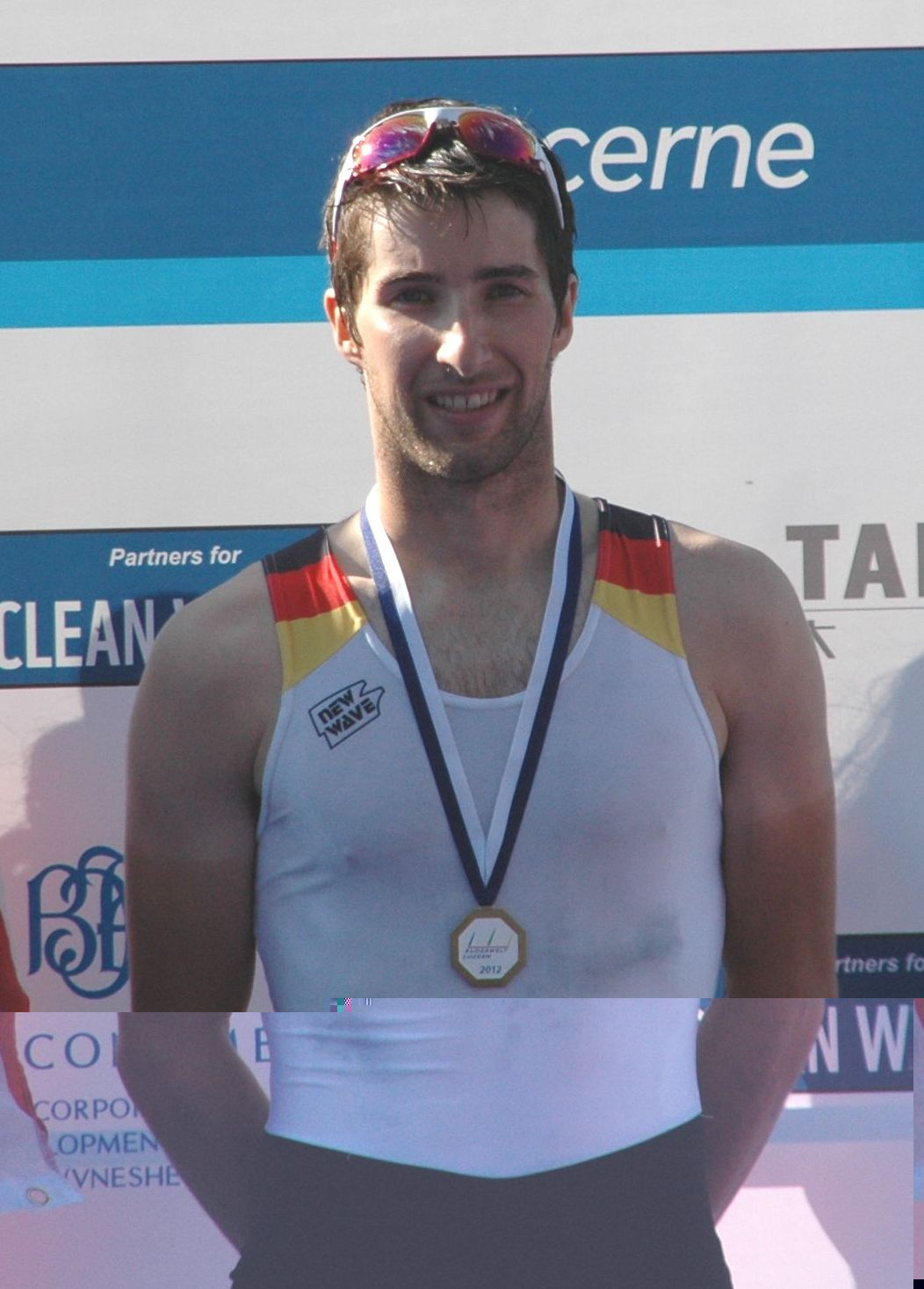
Koch in 2012

Jonathan Koch (born 29 October 1985 in Giessen) is a German lightweight rower.

Until the end of 2010, Jonathan Koch was rowing for his hometown club Gießener Rudergesellschaft 1877. Already in summer 2010, he became part of the training group of Mainzer Ruder-Verein 1878 (MRV) under the supervision of Robert Sens, the rowing head coach of the German Federal State of Rhineland-Palatinate. Since 2011 he is officially rowing for MRV. After reaching only the B-final at the 2006 World Rowing Championships in Single Sculls he reached the A-final the following year at the World Championships in Munich, Germany, where he finished fourth. Since the Lightweight Single Sculls are not an Olympic boat class, Koch competed at the 2008 Beijing Olympics together with Manuel Brehmer in the Men's Lightweight Double Sculls where they finished ninth.

After a break in 2009 Jonathan Koch was rowing Single Sculls as well as Quadruple Sculls at the 2010 World Championships in Karapiro, NZ. While finishing 8th in Single Sculls he became World Champion Quadruple Sculls.

At the 2011 German Championships Koch gained the title of German Champion in Single Sculls as well as Quadruple Sculls.

At the 2016 Summer Olympics in Rio de Janeiro, he competed in the men's lightweight coxless four. The German team finished in 9th place.

== International results ==
- 2005: 7th place U23-World Championships, Lightweight Single Sculls
- 2006: 9th place World Championships, Lightweight Single Sculls
- 2007: 4th place World Championships, Lightweight Single Sculls
- 2008: 9th place Olympic Games, Lightweight Single Sculls
- 2010: 1st place World Championships, Quadruple Single Sculls
- 2010: 8th place World Championships, Lightweight Single Sculls
- 2011: 8th place World Championships, Lightweight Single Sculls
