= Zak Lee-Green =

Welsh and British rower

Personal information
- Nationality: British
- Born: 5 February 1991 (age 35) Cardiff, Wales

Sport
- Country: Great Britain
- Sport: Rowing
- Club: Agecroft RC
Medal record
Men's rowing
Representing Great Britain
World Championships
Silver medal – second place	2017 Sarasota	Ltw quadruple sculls

Zak Lee-Green (born 5 February 1991) is a retired Welsh and British rower.

== Rowing career ==
Lee-Green from Cardiff, was initially selected for the Welsh squad before winning a bronze medal for Great Britain at the 2010 World Rowing U23 Championships. He made his senior British team debut at the 2014 World Rowing Cup. He won a silver medal at the 2017 World Rowing Championships in Sarasota, Florida, as part of the lightweight quadruple sculls with Edward Fisher, Gavin Horsburgh and Peter Chambers. He retired from competitive rowing in 2020.
