= Johannes Ursprung =

German lightweight rower (born 1991)

Personal information
- Born: 3 February 1991 (age 35)

Sport
- Sport: Rowing
Medal record
Men's rowing
Representing Germany
World Championships
Gold medal – first place	2016 Rotterdam	Lwt quad sculls
Bronze medal – third place	2022 Račice	Lwt quad sculls
European Championships
Gold medal – first place	2026 Varese	Lwt pair
Silver medal – second place	2022 Munich	Lwt quad sculls

Johannes Ursprung (born 3 February 1991) is a German lightweight rower. He won a gold medal at the 2016 World Rowing Championships in Rotterdam with the lightweight men's quadruple scull.
