= Georgios Konsolas =

Greek rower (born 1990)

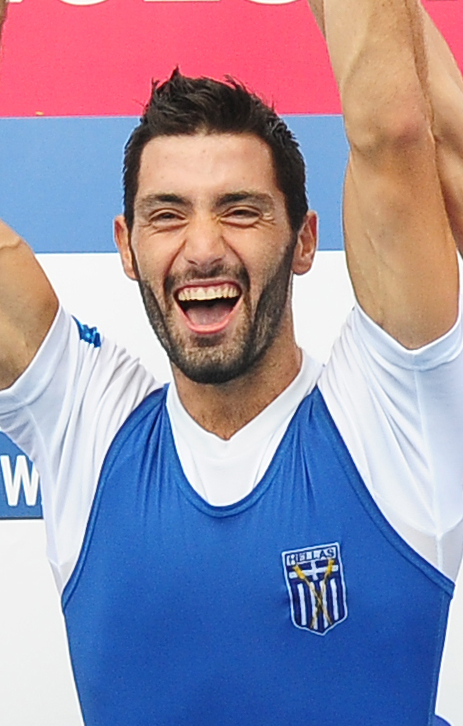
- Konsolas in 2013

Personal information
- Born: 17 November 1990 (age 35)

Sport
- Sport: Rowing
Medal record
Men's rowing
Representing Greece
World Championships
Gold medal – first place	2013 Chungju	Lwt quad sculls
Gold medal – first place	2014 Amsterdam	Lwt quad sculls
Silver medal – second place	2012 Plovdiv	Lwt quad sculls
Bronze medal – third place	2016 Rotterdam	Lwt quad sculls

Georgios Konsolas (born 17 November 1990) is a Greek lightweight rower. He won a gold medal at the 2013 World Rowing Championships in Chungju with the lightweight men's quadruple scull.
