= Enes Kuşku =

Turkish rower

Medal record

Men's Rowing

Representing Turkey

U23 World Championship
Silver medal – second place	2014 Varese	LM1x

Enes Kuşku (born 10 April 1994) is a Turkish rower.
