= Francesco Rigon =

Italian rower

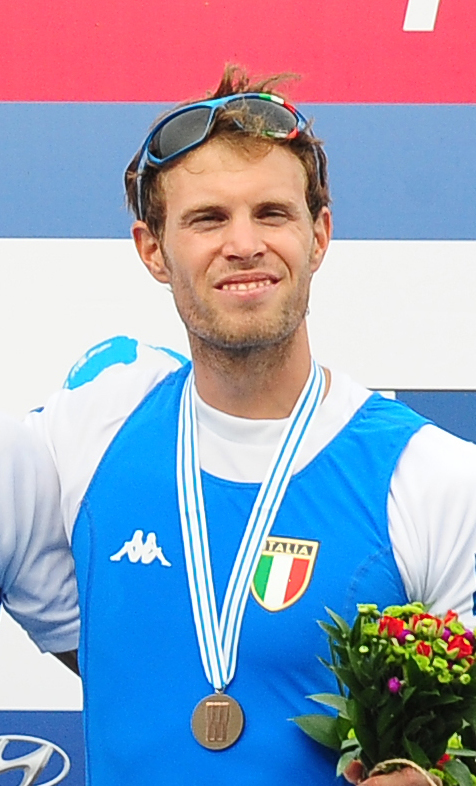
- Rigon in 2013

Personal information
- Born: 7 January 1987 (age 39)

Sport
- Sport: Rowing
Medal record
Men's rowing
Representing Italy
World Rowing Championships
Gold medal – first place	2011 Bled	Lwt quad scull
Bronze medal – third place	2013 Chungju	Lwt quad scull

Francesco Rigon (born 7 January 1987) is an Italian lightweight rower. He won a gold medal at the 2011 World Rowing Championships in Bled with the lightweight men's quadruple scull.
