= Callum McBrierty =

British rower (born 1992)

Personal information
- Born: 13 August 1992 (age 33)

Sport
- Sport: Rowing
- Club: Durham University BC
Medal record
Men's rowing
Representing Great Britain
World Championships
Gold medal – first place	2016 Rotterdam	M2+

Callum McBrierty is a British rower.

== Career ==
McBrierty competed for Durham University Boat Club as a student.

Alongside Oliver Cook and cox Henry Fieldman, McBrierty took Gold in the men's coxed pair at the 2016 World Championships in Rotterdam.
