= Spyridon Giannaros =

Greek rower (born 1992)

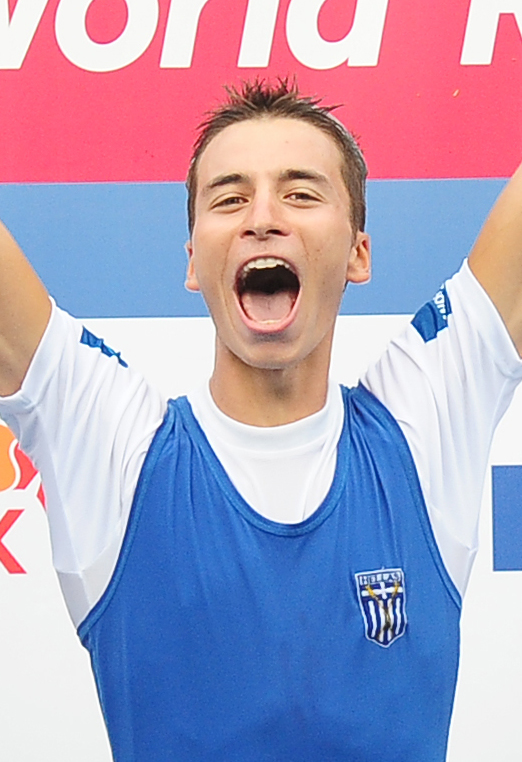
- Giannaros in 2013

Personal information
- Nationality: Greek
- Born: 12 May 1992 (age 34) Athens, Greece
- Height: 183 cm (6 ft 0 in)
- Weight: 72 kg (159 lb)

Sport
- Country: Greece
- Sport: Rowing
Medal record
Men's rowing
Representing Greece
World Championships
Gold medal – first place	2013 Chungju	Lwt quad sculls
Gold medal – first place	2014 Amsterdam	Lwt quad sculls
Bronze medal – third place	2016 Rotterdam	Lwt quad sculls
Bronze medal – third place	2017 Sarasota	Lwt quad sculls
European Championships
Gold medal – first place	2012 Varese	Lwt double sculls
Mediterranean Games
Gold medal – first place	Mersin 2013	Lwt double sculls
Bronze medal – third place	2018 Tarragona	LM1x

Spyridon Giannaros (born 12 May 1992) is a Greek competitive rower who lives in Athens. He is a two-time World Champion in the men's lightweight quadruple sculls. In 2014 he made world best time in Lm4x with Panagiotis Magdanis and Konsolas brothers. He won the gold medal at the 2012 Word rowing under 23 Championship in Trakai Lithuania, Lightweight single sculls. He competed at the 2016 Summer Olympics in Rio de Janeiro, in the men's lightweight coxless four, finishing in the sixth place. In 2021 he graduated as a physiotherapist from the University of West Attica.
