= 2016 World Rowing Championships =

International rowing event

- Venue: Willem-Alexander Baan
- Location: Rotterdam, Netherlands
- Dates: 21–28 August

The 2016 World Rowing Championships was the 46th edition and held from 21 to 28 August 2016 at the Willem-Alexander Baan in Rotterdam, Netherlands in conjunction with the World Junior Rowing Championships and the World Rowing U23 Championships. The annual week-long rowing regatta is organized by FISA (the International Rowing Federation), and held at the end of the northern hemisphere summer. Because the 2016 Summer Olympics and the 2016 Summer Paralympics were the major rowing events in 2016, the World Championships programme was limited to non-Olympic events, non-Paralympic events, and the World Rowing Junior Championships were held at the same time, and also the World Rowing U23 Championships.

== Medal summary ==
=== Medal table ===
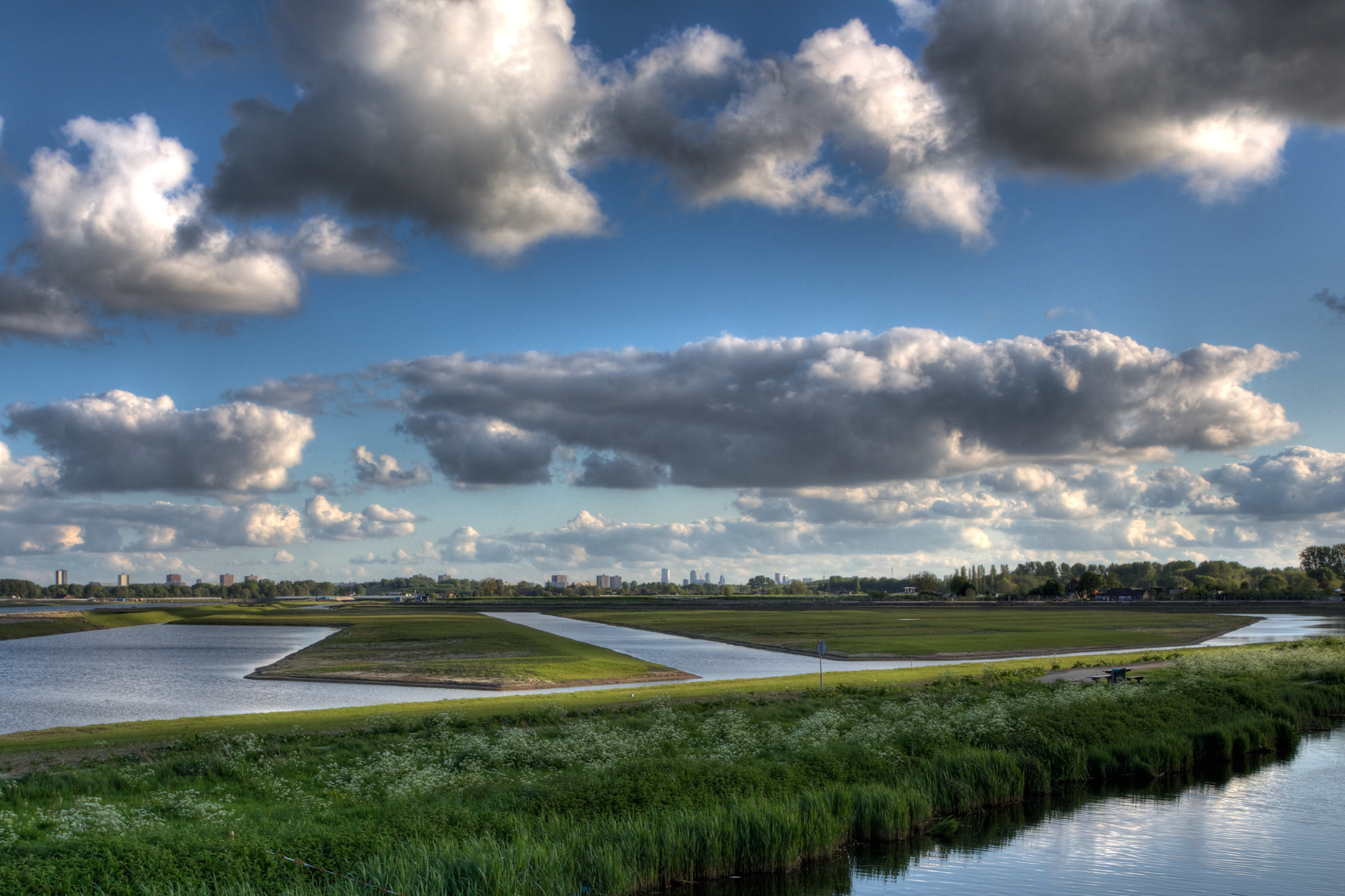
Willem-Alexander Baan during construction

Rank	Nation	Gold	Silver	Bronze	Total
1	Great Britain	3	0	1	4
2	France	2	1	0	3
3	Germany	1	1	1	3
4	Ireland	1	0	0	1
4	New Zealand	1	0	0	1
6	Canada	0	1	1	2
7	Austria	0	1	0	1
7	Denmark	0	1	0	1
7	Hungary	0	1	0	1
7	Sweden	0	1	0	1
7	United States	0	1	0	1
12	China	0	0	1	1
12	Greece	0	0	1	1
12	Italy	0	0	1	1
12	Russia	0	0	1	1
12	Slovakia	0	0	1	1
Totals (16 entries)		8	8	8	24

=== Events ===
The lightweight men's eight was discontinued after the 2015 World Rowing Championships due to low participation in three consecutive championships.

Event	Gold		Silver		Bronze	
Openweight events
M2+	Great Britain; Oliver Cook; Callum McBrierty; Henry Fieldman	7:29:69	Canada; Andrew Stewart-Jones; Benjamin de Wit; Kevin Chung	7:32:05	Italy; Mario Paonessa; Vincenzo Capelli; Andrea Riva	7:32:22
W4−	Great Britain; Fiona Gammond; Donna Etiebet; Holly Nixon; Holly Norton	7:16:28	United States; Molly Bruggeman; Emily Huelskamp; Corinne Schoeller; Kristine O'Brien	7:21:53	Germany; Melanie Hansen; Ronja Schütte; Charlotte Reinhardt; Lea-Kathleen Kühne	7:26:15
Lightweight events
LM1x	Paul O'Donovan; Ireland	7:32:84	Péter Galambos; Hungary	7:36:95	Lukáš Babač; Slovakia	7:38:89
LM4x	Germany; Patrik Stöcker; Florian Roller; Johannes Ursprung; Cedric Kulbach	6:23:09	France; François Teroin; Damien Piqueras; Maxime Demontfaucon; Morgan Maunoir	6:24:72	Greece; Georgios Konsolas; Spyridon Giannaros; Panagiotis Magdanis; Eleftherios Konsolas	6:26:58
LM2−	France; Augustin Mouterde; Alexis Guérinot	7:14.18	Denmark; Emil Espensen; Jens Vilhelmsen	7:15.30	Great Britain; Joel Cassells; Sam Scrimgeour	7:16.49
LW1x	Zoe McBride; New Zealand	8:28:45	Emma Fredh; Sweden	8:29:12	Katherine Sauks; Canada	8:37:96
LW4x	Great Britain; Brianna Stubbs; Emily Craig; Imogen Walsh; Eleanor Piggott	7:10:60	Germany; Judith Anlauf; Leonie Pieper; Lena Reuss; Katrin Thoma	7:12:45	China; Xuan Xulian; Zhang Weixiao; Zhang Weimiao; Yan Xiaohua	7:21:04
Pararowing (adaptive) events
LTAMix2x	France; Guylaine Marchand; Fabien Saint-Lannes	8:38.53	Austria; Johanna Beyer; Rainer Putz	9:06.51	Russia; Valentina Zhagot; Evgenii Borisov	9:27.74

=== Event codes ===
	Single sculls	Double sculls	Quadruple sculls	Coxless pair	Coxless four	Coxed pair	Coxed four	Eight
Men's	Olympics	Olympics	Olympics	Olympics	Olympics	M2+		Olympics
Women's	Olympics	Olympics	Olympics	Olympics	W4−			Olympics
Lightweight men's	LM1x	Olympics	LM4x	LM2−	Olympics			
Lightweight women's	LW1x	Olympics	LW4x					
AS men's	Paralympics							
AS women's	Paralympics							
TA mixed		Paralympics						
LTA mixed		LTAMix2x					Paralympics	

Adaptive rowing classification — AS: arms & shoulders, TA: trunk & arms, LTA: legs, trunk, arms

== See also ==
- Rowing at the 2016 Summer Olympics
- World Rowing Junior Championships 2016
- 2016 World Rowing U23 Championships
