= Jiří Kopáč =

Czech rower (born 1982)

Personal information
- Born: 23 February 1982 (age 44) Prague, Czechoslovakia

Sport
- Sport: Rowing
Medal record
Men's rowing
Representing Czech Republic
World Championships
Bronze medal – third place	2022 Račice	Lwt coxless pair
European Championships
Silver medal – second place	2011 Plovdiv	Lwt coxless four
Silver medal – second place	2013 Seville	Lwt coxless four
Silver medal – second place	2018 Glasgow	Lwt quad sculls
Bronze medal – third place	2008 Marathon	Lwt coxless four
Bronze medal – third place	2017 Račice	Lwt coxless four

Jiří Kopáč (Czech pronunciation: [ˈjɪr̝iː ˈkopaːtʃ]; born 23 February 1982) is a Czech rower. He competed in the Men's lightweight coxless four event at the 2012 Summer Olympics.
