= Ninos Nikolaidis =

Greek rower (born 1998)

Personal information
- Nationality: Greek
- Born: 14 May 1998 (age 28) Volos
- Height: 1.84 m (6 ft 0 in)
- Weight: 72 kg (159 lb)

Sport
- Country: Greece
- Sport: Rowing
Medal record
Gold medal 2016 world junior championship Rotterdam Bronze medal 2017 world championship Florida
Mediterranean Games
Silver medal – second place	2018 Tarragona	LM2x

Nino Nikolaidis is former rower from Greece. He is from Volos and he lives in Athens. He has achievements in World, European and Greek Championships.

In 2024 he took part in Survivor Greece in Season 12 where was the winner.
