= 2017 World Rowing Championships =

International rowing event

- Venue: Nathan Benderson Park
- Location: Sarasota, Florida, United States
- Dates: 24 September – 1 October
- Competitors: 921 from 68 nations

The 2017 World Rowing Championships were the 47th edition of the World Rowing Championships that were held from 24 September to 1 October 2017 in Sarasota, Florida.

== Host selection ==
During 2013, Plovdiv and Sarasota, Florida both applied to host the 2017 World Rowing Championships. In April 2013, a committee of International Rowing Federation (FISA) officials visited Sarasota and then Plovdiv the following month. It was then noted that Plovdiv had hosted the 2012 World Rowing Championships and bid documentation for 2017 had not been finalized. Before the next FISA congress, the bid from Plovdiv was changed to apply for the 2018 hosting rights. At the FISA Congress held on 2 September 2013, hosting rights were assigned by unanimous decision for World Rowing Championships to Sarasota for 2017, Plovdiv for 2018, and Plovdiv for the 2015 World Rowing U23 Championships.

== Medals ==
=== Rowing ===
| Rank | Nation | Gold | Silver | Bronze | Total |
|---|---|---|---|---|---|
| 1 | Italy | 3 | 3 | 2 | 8 |
| 2 | New Zealand | 3 | 2 | 2 | 7 |
| 3 | Australia | 2 | 2 | 1 | 5 |
| 4 | France | 2 | 0 | 0 | 2 |
| 4 | Ireland | 2 | 0 | 0 | 2 |
| 4 | Romania | 2 | 0 | 0 | 2 |
| 7 | Netherlands | 1 | 1 | 0 | 2 |
| 8 | Germany | 1 | 0 | 2 | 3 |
| 9 | Czech Republic | 1 | 0 | 0 | 1 |
| 9 | Hungary | 1 | 0 | 0 | 1 |
| 9 | Lithuania | 1 | 0 | 0 | 1 |
| 9 | South Africa | 1 | 0 | 0 | 1 |
| 9 | Switzerland | 1 | 0 | 0 | 1 |
| 14 | Great Britain | 0 | 3 | 3 | 6 |
| 15 | United States | 0 | 3 | 2 | 5 |
| 16 | Poland | 0 | 3 | 0 | 3 |
| 17 | Russia | 0 | 1 | 1 | 2 |
| 18 | Canada | 0 | 1 | 0 | 1 |
| 18 | Croatia | 0 | 1 | 0 | 1 |
| 18 | Cuba | 0 | 1 | 0 | 1 |
| 21 | China | 0 | 0 | 2 | 2 |
| 22 | Austria | 0 | 0 | 1 | 1 |
| 22 | Brazil | 0 | 0 | 1 | 1 |
| 22 | Denmark | 0 | 0 | 1 | 1 |
| 22 | Estonia | 0 | 0 | 1 | 1 |
| 22 | Greece | 0 | 0 | 1 | 1 |
| 22 | Norway | 0 | 0 | 1 | 1 |
| Totals (27 entries) | | 21 | 21 | 21 | 63 |

=== Para rowing ===
| Rank | Nation | Gold | Silver | Bronze | Total |
|---|---|---|---|---|---|
| 1 | Australia | 1 | 0 | 0 | 1 |
| 1 | Brazil | 1 | 0 | 0 | 1 |
| 1 | Great Britain | 1 | 0 | 0 | 1 |
| 1 | Netherlands | 1 | 0 | 0 | 1 |
| 1 | Norway | 1 | 0 | 0 | 1 |
| 6 | Ukraine | 0 | 2 | 0 | 2 |
| 7 | France | 0 | 1 | 0 | 1 |
| 7 | Israel | 0 | 1 | 0 | 1 |
| 7 | United States | 0 | 1 | 0 | 1 |
| 10 | Germany | 0 | 0 | 2 | 2 |
| 11 | Italy | 0 | 0 | 1 | 1 |
| 11 | Poland | 0 | 0 | 1 | 1 |
| 11 | Russia | 0 | 0 | 1 | 1 |
| Totals (13 entries) | | 5 | 5 | 5 | 15 |

== Medal summary ==
Non-Olympic classes

=== Men's events ===
| Event | Gold | | Silver | | Bronze | |
Openweight events
| M1x | Ondřej Synek; Czech Republic | 6:40.64 | Ángel Fournier; Cuba | 6:43.49 | Tom Barras; Great Britain | 6:45.14 |
| M2x | New Zealand; John Storey; Chris Harris | 6:10.07 | Poland; Mirosław Ziętarski; Mateusz Biskup | 6:10.66 | Italy; Filippo Mondelli; Luca Rambaldi | 6:11.33 |
| M4x | Lithuania; Dovydas Nemeravičius; Martynas Džiaugys; Rolandas Maščinskas; Aurimas Adomavičius | 5:43.10 | Great Britain; Jack Beaumont; Jonathan Walton; John Collins; Graeme Thomas | 5:45.03 | Estonia; Kaur Kuslap; Allar Raja; Tõnu Endrekson; Kaspar Taimsoo | 5:45.32 |
| M2− | Italy; Matteo Lodo; Giuseppe Vicino | 6:16.22 | Croatia; Martin Sinković; Valent Sinković | 6:16.56 | New Zealand; Tom Murray; James Hunter | 6:20.85 |
| M4− | Australia; Joshua Hicks; Spencer Turrin; Jack Hargreaves; Alexander Hill | 5:55.24 | Italy; Marco Di Costanzo; Giovanni Abagnale; Matteo Castaldo; Domenico Montrone | 5:57.19 | Great Britain; Matthew Rossiter; Moe Sbihi; Matthew Tarrant; Will Satch | 5:57.99 |
| M2+ | Hungary; Adrián Juhász; Béla Simon; Andrea Vanda Kolláth | 6:54.80 | Australia; Darcy Wruck; Angus Widdicombe; James Rook | 6:56.60 | Germany; Malte Großmann; Finn Schröder; Jonas Wiesen | 6:58.37 |
| M8+ | Germany; Johannes Weißenfeld; Felix Wimberger; Max Planer; Torben Johannesen; Jakob Schneider; Malte Jakschik; Richard Schmidt; Hannes Ocik; Martin Sauer | 5:26.85 | United States; Dariush Aghai; Yohann Rigogne; Alexander Karwoski; Jordan Vanderstoep; Thomas Peszek; Nicholas Mead; Andrew Reed; Patrick Eble; Julian Venonsky | 5:28.45 | Italy; Cesare Gabbia; Emanuele Liuzzi; Luca Parlato; Paolo Perino; Bruno Rosetti; Mario Paonessa; Davide Mumolo; Leonardo Pietra; Enrico D'Aniello | 5:28.90 |
Lightweight events
| LM1x | Ireland; Paul O'Donovan | 6:48.87 | New Zealand; Matthew Dunham | 6:52.16 | Norway; Kristoffer Brun | 6:52.35 |
| LM2x | France; Pierre Houin; Jérémie Azou | 6:13.10 | Italy; Stefano Oppo; Pietro Ruta | 6:15.15 | China; Sun Man; Fan Junjie | 6:15.40 |
| LM4x | France; François Teroin; Damien Piqueras; Maxime Demontfaucon; Stany Delayre | 5:51.85 | Great Britain; Edward Fisher; Zak Lee-Green; Peter Chambers; Gavin Horsburgh | 5:52.02 | Greece; Ninos Nikolaidis; Panagiotis Magdanis; Spyridon Giannaros; Eleftherios Konsolas | 5:53.64 |
| LM2− | Ireland; Mark O'Donovan; Shane O'Driscoll | 6:32.42 | Italy; Giuseppe Di Mare; Alfonso Scalzone | 6:34.20 | Brazil; Xavier Vela; Willian Giaretton | 6:35.30 |
| LM4− | Italy; Federico Duchich; Leone Barbaro; Lorenzo Tedesco; Piero Sfiligoi | 5:59.60 | Russia; Maksim Telitcyn; Aleksandr Bogdashin; Alexander Chaukin; Aleksey Vikulin | 6:01.91 | Germany; Patrik Stöcker; Sven Keßler; Jonathan Koch; Julius Peschel | 6:03.37 |

=== Women's events ===
| Event | Gold | | Silver | | Bronze | |
Openweight events
| W1x | Jeannine Gmelin; Switzerland | 7:22.58 | Victoria Thornley; Great Britain | 7:24.50 | Magdalena Lobnig; Austria | 7:26.56 |
| W2x | New Zealand; Brooke Donoghue; Olivia Loe | 6:45.08 | United States; Meghan O'Leary; Ellen Tomek | 6:46.57 | Australia; Olympia Aldersey; Madeleine Edmunds | 6:49.76 |
| W4x | Netherlands; Olivia van Rooijen; Inge Janssen; Sophie Souwer; Nicole Beukers | 6:16.72 | Poland; Agnieszka Kobus; Marta Wieliczko; Maria Springwald; Katarzyna Zillmann | 6:17.71 | Great Britain; Bethany Bryan; Mathilda Hodgkins-Byrne; Jessica Leyden; Holly Nixon | 6:19.93 |
| W2− | New Zealand; Grace Prendergast; Kerri Gowler | 7:00.53 | United States; Megan Kalmoe; Tracy Eisser | 7:04.37 | Denmark; Hedvig Rasmussen; Christina Johansen | 7:06.21 |
| W4− | Australia; Lucy Stephan; Katrina Werry; Sarah Hawe; Molly Goodman | 6:33.58 | Poland; Olga Michałkiewicz; Joanna Dittmann; Monika Ciaciuch; Maria Wierzbowska | 6:34.25 | Russia; Elena Oriabinskaia; Anastasia Tikhanova; Ekaterina Potapova; Alevtina Savkina | 6:34.67 |
| W8+ | Romania; Ioana Vrînceanu; Viviana-Iuliana Bejinariu; Mihaela Petrilă; Iuliana Popa; Mădălina Bereș; Denisa Tîlvescu; Adelina Boguș; Laura Oprea; Daniela Druncea | 6:06.40 | Canada; Lisa Roman; Kristin Bauder; Nicole Hare; Hillary Janssens; Christine Roper; Susanne Grainger; Jennifer Martins; Rebecca Zimmerman; Kristen Kit | 6:07.09 | New Zealand; Ashlee Rowe; Ruby Tew; Georgia Perry; Kelsey Bevan; Kelsi Walters; Rebecca Scown; Lucy Spoors; Emma Dyke; Sam Bosworth | 6:07.27 |
Lightweight events
| LW1x | South Africa; Kirsten McCann | 7:38.78 | Netherlands; Marieke Keijser | 7:41.00 | United States; Mary Jones | 7:42.45 |
| LW2x | Romania; Ionela-Livia Lehaci; Gianina Beleagă | 6:55.88 | New Zealand; Zoe McBride; Jackie Kiddle | 6:56.09 | United States; Emily Schmieg; Michelle Sechser | 6:56.38 |
| LW4x | Italy; Asja Maregotto; Paola Piazzolla; Federica Cesarini; Giovanna Schettino | 6:33.97 | Australia; Amy James; Alice Arch; Georgia Miansarow; Georgia Nesbitt | 6:35.47 | China; Xuan Xulian; Shen Ling; Pan Dandan; Chen Fang | 6:36.33 |

=== Pararowing (adaptive) events ===
All boat classes (except PR3Mix2x) are also Paralympic.

| Event | Gold | | Silver | | Bronze | |
|---|---|---|---|---|---|---|
| PR1M1x | Erik Horrie; Australia | 9:39.48 | Roman Polianskyi; Ukraine | 9:47.89 | Alexey Chuvashev; Russia | 9:52.25 |
| PR1W1x | Birgit Skarstein; Norway | 11:14.17 | Moran Samuel; Israel | 11:20.81 | Sylvia Pille-Steppart; Germany | 11:55.75 |
| PR2Mix2x | Netherlands; Annika van der Meer; Corne de Koning | 8:11.00 | Ukraine; Iaroslav Koiuda; Iryna Kyrychenko | 8:28.71 | Poland; Michał Gadowski; Jolanta Majka | 8:29.77 |
| PR3Mix2x | Brazil; Diana Barcelos de Oliveira; Jairo Klug | 7:28.95 | France; Antoine Jesel; Guylaine Marchand | 7:34.70 | Germany; Jessica Dietz; Valentin Luz | 7:40.72 |
| PR3Mix4+ | Great Britain; Grace Clough; Giedrė Rakauskaitė; Oliver Stanhope; James Fox; Anna Corderoy (c) | 6:55.70 | United States; Jaclyn Smith; Michael Varro; Zachary Burns; Danielle Hansen; Jennifer Sichel (c) | 7:18.80 | Italy; Lucilla Aglioti; Tommaso Schettino; Luca Agoletto; Paola Protopapa; Gaetano Iannuzzi (c) | 7:23.52 |

=== Event codes ===
| | Single sculls | Double sculls | Quadruple sculls | Coxless pair | Coxless four | Coxed pair | Coxed four | Eight |
| Men's | M1x | M2x | M4x | M2− | M4− | M2+ | | M8+ |
| Lightweight men's | LM1x | LM2x | LM4x | LM2− | LM4− | | | |
| Women's | W1x | W2x | W4x | W2− | W4− | | | W8+ |
| Lightweight women's | LW1x | LW2x | LW4x | | | | | |
| PR1 men's | PR1M1x | | | | | | | |
| PR1 women's | PR1W1x | | | | | | | |
| PR2 mixed | | PR2Mix2x | | | | | | |
| PR3 mixed | | PR3Mix2x | | | | | PR3Mix4+ | |

Para-rowing classification — PR1: arms & shoulders, PR2: trunk & arms, PR3: legs, trunk, arms
