= 2013 British Rowing Senior Championships =

- Venue: National Water Sports Centre
- Location: Holme Pierrepont (Nottingham)
- Dates: 19–20 October 2013

The 2013 British Rowing Senior Championships were the 42nd edition of the National Senior Championships, held from 19–20 October 2013 at the National Water Sports Centre in Holme Pierrepont, Nottingham. They were organised and sanctioned by British Rowing, and are open to British rowers.

== Medal summary ==
Event	Gold	Silver	Bronze
Victor Ludorum	Leander	n/a	n/a
Open 2x	Leander A Charles Cousins & Matt Langridge	Leander C Jonathan Walton & John Collins	Tideway Scullers School / London; Bill Lucas & Alan Campbell
Open 4-	Leander A Tom Ransley, Will Satch, Pete Reed, Alex Gregory	Molesey; Philip Congdon, Moe Sbihi, George Nash, James Foad	Isis; Iain Mandale, Nik Hazell, Karl Hudspith, Constantine Louloudis
Open 4x	Leander A Jonathan Walton, Matt Langridge, Charles Cousins, John Collins	Agecroft; Hugh Gallie, Oliver Lee, Zak Lee-Green, Graeme Thomas	Leander B Jack Beaumont, Sebastian Devereux, Sholto Carnegie, Angus Groom
Open 8+	Leander A Alan Sinclair, Daniel Ritchie, Matt Gotrel, Lance Tredell, Tom Ransley, Alex Gregory, Pete Reed, Will Satch, Phelan Hill (cox)	Molesey; Dave Bell, Alistair Gregory, Christopher Rae, Frederick Gill, Philip Congdon, Moe Sbihi, George Nash, James Foad, Henry Fieldman (cox)	Leander C Timothy Clarke, David Kempsell, William Warr, Callum McBrierty, Francis Highton, Adam Neill, Matthew Tatlock, George Rossiter, Oliver James (cox)
Women 2x	Leander A Frances Houghton & Victoria Meyer-Laker	Leander D Jessica Leyden & Victoria Thornley	Imperial College / London; Imogen Walsh & Melanie Wilson
Women 4x	Tees / Hollingworth Lake; Katherine Copeland, Bethany Bryan, Jessica Leyden, Kristina Stiller	Wallingford; Caroline Greves, Kathryn Twyman, Elizabeth Polgreen, Brianna Stubbs	Nottingham; Katie Bartlett, Bethan Lloyd, Catherine Lineker, Sarah Bonar
Women 4-	Leander; Caragh McMurtry, Louisa Reeve, Lucinda Gooderham, Polly Swann	Imperial College / Oxford Brookes University / Minerva Bath; Zoe Lee, Helen Wood, Olivia Carnegie-Brown, Helen Glover	Molesey; Ruth Walczak, Gabby Rodriguez, Karen Bennett, Samantha Fowler
Women 8+	Leander; Caragh McMurtry, Louisa Reeve, Victoria Meyer-Laker, Pippa Whittaker, Frances Houghton, Polly Swann, Katie Greves, Victoria Thornley, Zoe de Toledo (cox)	Composite; Imogen Walsh, Melanie Wilson, Georgia Francis, Helen Wood, Beth Rodford, Zoe Lee, Helen Glover, Olivia Carnegie-Brown, Morgan Bayham-Williams (cox)	Cambridge University; Jillian Tovey, Caroline Reid, Kate Ashley, Isabella Vyvyan, Claire Watkins, Melissa Wilson, Holly Game, Emily Day, Esther Monmcilovic (cox)

Key
Symbol	meaning
1, 2, 4, 8	crew size
+	coxed
-	coxless
x	sculls
