= 2014 British Rowing Senior Championships =

- Venue: National Water Sports Centre
- Location: Holme Pierrepont (Nottingham)
- Dates: 18–19 October 2014

The 2014 British Rowing Senior Championships were the 43rd edition of the National Senior Championships, held from 18–19 October 2014 at the National Water Sports Centre in Holme Pierrepont, Nottingham. They were organised and sanctioned by British Rowing, and are open to British rowers. Bad weather in the forms of gusts of wind resulted in the medals (for the quadruple sculls and coxed eights) being awarded based on the crews positions during qualifying races.

== Medal summary ==
Event	Gold	Silver	Bronze
Victor Ludorum	Leander	n/a	n/a
Open 2x	Leander B Jonathan Walton & John Collins	Leander A Peter Lambert, Charles Cousins	Leander E Jack Beaumont & Angus Groom
Open 4-	Molesey; James Foad, Moe Sbihi, George Nash, Andrew Triggs Hodge	Isis; Iain Mandale, Michael di Santo, William Geffen, Constantine Louloudis	Leander B Barnaby Stentiford, Will Satch, Matt Langridge, Matthew Rossiter
Open 4x	William Borlase / Agecroft / Reading University; Zak Lee-Green, Sam Townsend, Rufus Biggs, Christopher Lawrie	Leander B Jack Beaumont, Angus Groom, Stewart Innes, Daniel Boddington	Leander A John Collins, Charles Cousins, Peter Lambert, Jonathan Walton
Open 8+	Leander; Pete Reed, Alex Gregory, Adam Neill, Matt Langridge, Richard Chambers, Matt Gotrel, Chris Bartley, Will Satch, Phelan Hill (cox)	Oxford Brookes University; Joel Cassells, Peter Chambers, Jamie Copus, Rory Copus, Edward Grisedale, Scott Durant, Timothy Grant, Petru Alin Zaharia	Molesey; Dave Bell, Philip Congdon, Henry Fieldman, James Foad, Karl Hudspith, George Nash, Moe Sbihi, Josh Tonnar, Andrew Triggs Hodge
Women 2x	Imperial College; Emma Twigg & Melanie Wilson	Gloucester / Reading University; Beth Rodford & Mathilda Hodgkins-Byrne	Tees; Kristina Stiller & Katherine Copeland
Women 4x	London / Imperial College / Minerva Bath / Army; Jessica Eddie, Zoe Lee, Helen Glover, Heather Stanning	Wallingford; Miriam Jones-Walters, Elizabeth Polgreen, Gemma Hall, Louise Hart	Gloucester Hartpury / Gloucester / Reading University; Charlotte Hodgkins-Byrne, Mathilda Hodgkins-Byrne, Flo Pickles, Beth Rodford
Women 4-	Army / London / Imperial College / Minerva Bath; Zoe Lee, Jessica Eddie, Heather Stanning, Helen Glover	Leander A Rosamund Bradbury, Louisa Reeve, Katie Greves, Polly Swann	Leander B Karen Bennett, Pippa Whittaker, Monica Relph, Katherine Douglas
Women 8+	Leander; Rosamund Bradbury, Katherine Douglas, Monica Relph, Karen Bennett, Pippa Whittaker, Louisa Reeve, Katie Greves, Polly Swann, Zoe de Toledo (cox)	Imperial College; Donna Etiebet, Georgia Francis, Nicola Mason, Sara Parfett, Joanna Thom, Michelle Vezie, Isabell von Loga, Helen Wood, Christopher Au (cox)	Newcastle University; Sarah Fabes, Natasha Harris-White, Martha Dixon, Katherine Bulmer, Helen O'Riordan, Bridget Stratford, Emily Ford, Grace Hockenhull, Sasha Adwani (cox)

Key
Symbol	meaning
1, 2, 4, 8	crew size
+	coxed
-	coxless
x	sculls
