= 2015 British Rowing Senior Championships =

- Venue: National Water Sports Centre
- Location: Holme Pierrepont (Nottingham)
- Dates: 17–18 October 2015

The 2015 British Rowing Senior Championships were the 44th edition of the National Senior Championships, held from 17–18 October 2015 at the National Water Sports Centre in Holme Pierrepont, Nottingham. They were organised and sanctioned by British Rowing, and are open to British rowers.

== Medal summary ==
Event	Gold	Silver	Bronze
Victor Ludorum	Leander	n/a	n/a
Open 2x	Leander A Alan Sinclair & Nick Middleton	Leander D Rowan Law & Andy Joel	Edinburgh University; Gavin Horsburgh & Matthew Curtis
Open 4-	Leander A Stewart Innes, Pete Reed, Matt Langridge, Constantine Louloudis	Molesey; Tom Marshall, Moe Sbihi, George Nash, Sam Whittaker	Leander B Will Satch, Alex Gregory, Matt Gotrel, Tom Ransley
Open 4x	Leander A Jonny Walton, John Collins, Nick Middleton, Peter Lambert	Leander D Harry Glenister, Harry Leask, Rowan Law, Andy Joel	Tideway Scullers School / William Borlase / Agecroft; Zak Lee-Green, Alan Campbell, Harry Shimmin, Chris Lawrie
Open 8+	Oxford Brookes University; Petru Alin Zaharia, Jamie Copus, Henry Swarbrick, Morgan Bolding, Matthew Tarrant, Scott Durant, Rory Gibbs, Joel Cassells, Harry Brightmore (cox)	Leander A William Warr, Tom Ford, Cameron Buchan, Adam Neill, Barnaby Stentiford, Matthew Rossiter, Tim Clarke, George Rossiter, Oliver James (cox)	London University; James Richards, Edward Surman, James Fox, Oliver Cook, Paul Bennett, Rich Clarke, Nathaniel Reilly-O'Donnell, Matthew Bedford, Matilda Horn (cox)
Women 2x	Imperial College / Reading University; Georgia Francis & Mathilda Hodgkins-Byrne	Wallingford; Eleanor Piggott & Brianna Stubbs	Leander A Katie Greves & Polly Swann
Women 4x	Leander A Victoria Thornley, Victoria Meyer-Laker, Polly Swann, Jessica Leyden	Reading / Isle of Ely; Samantha Courty, Alice Bowyer, Holly Hill, Mathilda Hodgkins-Byrne	Leander B Margery Pepper, Katherine Douglas, Emily Carmichael, Francesca Rawlins
Women 4-	Leander; Lou Reeve, Lucinda Gooderham, Rosamund Bradbury, Katherine Douglas	Gloucester / William Borlase / Marlow; Beth Rodford, Ellen Roberts, Molly Harding, Katherine Grainger	Molesey / Queen's University Belfast; Rebecca Edwards, Helen Roberts, Aimee Jonckers, Gabby Rodriguez
Women 8+	Imperial College; Donna Etiebet, Georgia Francis, Joanna Thom, Sara Parfett, Michelle Vezie, Helen Wood, Rebecca Shorten, Melanie Wilson, Jessica Saunders (cox)	Cambridge University; Zara Goozee, Fiona Macklin, Hannah Roberts, Thea Zabell, Alice Jackson, Caroline Habjan, Ashton Brown, Myriam Goudet, Rosemary Ostfeld (cox)	Oxford Brookes University; Grace Macdonald, Imogen Mackie, Katherine Brown, Cecelia Mowczan, Jess Brown, Olivia Carnegie-Brown, Annie Withers, Susannah Dear, Alice McWilliam (cox)

Key
Symbol	meaning
1, 2, 4, 8	crew size
+	coxed
-	coxless
x	sculls
