= Women's Eights Head of the River Race =

Annual rowing race on the Thames river

- Frequency: Annual
- Locations: Championship Course, River Thames in London, England
- Years active: 1927 – present
- Previous event: 8 March 2025
- Next event: 14 March 2026
- Participants: 320 crews
- Website: www.wehorr.org

Championship Course on a flood tide (e.g. for the Boat Race). The Start and Finish are reversed when racing on an ebb tide. "Middlesex" and "Surrey" denote banks of the Thames Tideway, not the actual English counties

The Women's Eights Head of the River Race (WEHoRR) is a processional rowing race held annually on the Tideway of the River Thames in London on the 4 1/4-mile (6.8 km) Championship Course from Mortlake to Putney.

A mirror of the Eights Head of the River for male crews, it is held a fortnight earlier when the tides are similar. It is raced on the outgoing tide and starting around one hour after high tide in order to maximise advantage from the tidal flow.

Around 300 crews of women (with the occasional male coxswain) compete for over a dozen trophies and pennants. There are categories for beginners, elite and veteran rowers.

== History ==
The race was first held in 1927 following the first running of the men's version in 1926. At first it was simply a match between Ace and Weybridge LARC. This race was run as a side-by-side race, with Weybridge winning in a boat borrowed from Thames Rowing Club. The second year featured the same two crews, and the same result. In 1929, for the third race, there was the addition of Alpha, having formed in a split from Ace in 1927. Alpha won this running of the race.

The first running of the race in processional format was in 1930, as the entries had risen to five, making it impossible to run fairly in the side-by-side format on the tidal river. Furnivall Sculling Club (then an all women's club) won this first processional version of the race. It then continued in similar format annually until the outbreak of war in 1939.

The event restarted in 1950, with a shortened course of 2 miles, as it was felt that the effects of the war years and food rationing made the full course too hard. Entries grew from the original five to twelve by the mid 50s, and then declined to only six by the mid 60s. The lack of sectional boats meant that it was extremely difficult to transport boats from further afield, so the event was largely confined to the London clubs.

In the period from the 1970s onwards, entries rose ten-fold from 27 in 1977 to 300 in 2009. International crews have been visiting London to compete and entries have come from France, Germany, Italy, Spain, Sweden, Switzerland, the Netherlands and United States.

=== Records ===
Award	Year	Time	Crew
Head	2014	17:42.21	Army RC/Gloucester RC/Imperial College BC/London RC/Minerva-Bath RC/Oxford Brookes University BC/Tees RC
Club	2000	18:08.35	Marlow RC
Overseas	2014	18:20.55	Aviron Grenoble/C Aviron Nante/ Gerardmer AS Rowing/Lagny SN/Societe d'Encouragement du Sport Nautique (FRA)
Senior	2017	18:36.2	Imperial College A
Intermediate 1	2011	18:53.69	Reading University BC A
Provincial Club	2013	18:57.54	Nottingham RC A
Intermediate 2	2007	18:59.76	Imperial Col/Jesus College (Cam)/London RC/Wallingford/Westminster
University	2017	18:17.7	Cambridge University Women's BC A
Masters	2014	19:02.42	Clydesdale ARC/Molesey BC/Leander Club/Marlow RC/Tideway Scullers School/Thames RC [raw time]
Intermediate 3	2013	19:07.92	University of London BC A
School/Junior	2017	19:15.9	Headington School, Oxford BC A
Medium Club	2017	20:07.9	Exeter RC A
Small Club	2017	20:26.6	St Andrew BC
Novice Club	2014	19:48.19	Henley RC C
Novice Academic	2014	20:01.84	Newcastle University BC C

== Past winners ==
Year	Crew	Time
1993	Tideway Scullers School	19:03.7
1995	Kingston / Thames / Tideway Scullers	18:14.6
1996	Kingston / Thames / Tideway Scullers	18:24.52
1997	Thames RC	18:52.90
1998	Marlow RC	18:28.31
1999	Marlow RC	18:33.88
2000	Marlow / Notts County / Queens Tower / Sheffield / Thames	18:06.40
2001	Thames RC	19:22.28
2003	Imperial College BC/Kingston RC/Marlow RC/Oxford Brookes University BC/Thames RC	19:36.58
2004	Imperial College BC/Marlow RC/Reading University BC/Rob Roy BC/Thames RC/Tideway Scullers School	18:18.79
2005	Leander Club	19:20.83
2006	University of Birmingham BC/Marlow RC/Reading University BC/Rebecca/Thames RC/Tideway Scullers School	19:13.61
2007	Marlow RC/Rebecca/Tideway Scullers School/Thames RC	18:14.9
2008	Osiris BC	19:32.81
2009	London RC/Hollandia RC/Thames RC/Marlow RC/University of London BC	18:28.27
2010	Gloucester RC/Imperial College BC/Marlow RC/Reading University BC/Thames RC/University of London BC	18:10.67
2011	Leander Club	18:06.57
2012	Thames RC	20:10.92
2013	Imperial College BC	18:16.57
2014	Army RC/Gloucester RC/Imperial College BC/London RC/Minerva Bath RC/Oxford Brookes University BC/Tees RC	17:42.21
2015	Army BC/Imperial College BC/London RC/Marlow RC/Minerva Bath RC/Oxford Brookes University BC/Southampton Coalporters ARC	18:58.6
2016	Leander Club/Reading RC/Tees RC	19:17.7
2017	Leander Club	18:13.1
2018	Leander Club	18:34.7
2022	Leander Club	19:15.8
2023	Leander Club	18:38.1
2024	Leander Club	18:47.2
2025	Leander Club	18:41.9

== See also ==
- Rowing on the River Thames
- Head of the River Race
- Head of the River Fours
