= 2017 World Rowing Championships – Men's quadruple sculls =

Men's quadruple sculls at the 2017 World Rowing Championships
- Venue: Nathan Benderson Park
- Location: Sarasota, United States
- Dates: 24–30 September
- Competitors: 61 from 15 nations
- Winning time: 5:43.10

Medalists
gold medal	Dovydas Nemeravičius; Martynas Džiaugys; Rolandas Maščinskas; Aurimas Adomavičius	Lithuania
silver medal	Jack Beaumont; Jonathan Walton; John Collins; Graeme Thomas	Great Britain
bronze medal	Kaur Kuslap; Allar Raja; Tõnu Endrekson; Kaspar Taimsoo	Estonia

The men's quadruple sculls competition at the 2017 World Rowing Championships in Sarasota took place in Nathan Benderson Park.

== Schedule ==
The schedule was as follows:

Date	Time	Round
Sunday 24 September 2017	12:36	Heats
Tuesday 26 September 2017	13:20	Repechage
Thursday 28 September 2017	12:31	Semifinals A/B
Friday 29 September 2017	14:10	Final C
Saturday 30 September 2017	09:35	Final B
Saturday 30 September 2017	12:27	Final A

All times are Eastern Daylight Time (UTC-4)

== Results ==
=== Heats ===
The three fastest boats in each heat advanced directly to the A/B semifinals. The remaining boats were sent to the repechage.

==== Heat 1 ====
Rank	Rowers	Country	Time	Notes
1	Dariusz Radosz; Wiktor Chabel; Dominik Czaja; Adam Wicenciak	Poland	5:52.89	SA/B
2	Giacomo Thomas; Nathan Flannery; Cameron Crampton; Lewis Hollows	New Zealand	5:53.45	SA/B
3	Andrey Potapkin; Alexander Vyazovkin; Nikolay Pimenov; Pavel Sorin	Russia	5:53.56	SA/B
4	Mickaël Marteau; Albéric Cormerais; Bastien Quiqueret; Maxime Ducret	France	5:55.40	R
5	Yi Xudi; Liu Zhiyu; Zhang Liang; Zhang Quan	China	6:08.00	R

==== Heat 2 ====
Rank	Rowers	Country	Time	Notes
1	Dovydas Nemeravičius; Martynas Džiaugys; Rolandas Maščinskas; Aurimas Adomavičius	Lithuania	5:46.06	SA/B
2	Abe Wiersma; Koen Metsemakers; Amos Keijser; Freek Robbers	Netherlands	5:47.61	SA/B
3	Kaur Kuslap; Allar Raja; Tõnu Endrekson; Kaspar Taimsoo	Estonia	5:48.72	SA/B
4	Martin Helseth; Erik Solbakken; Jan Helvig; Nils Jakob Hoff	Norway	5:54.54	R
5	Leonard Futterman; Erik Frid; Lucas Wilhelm; Jonathan Kirkegaard	United States	6:05.01	R

==== Heat 3 ====
Rank	Rowers	Country	Time	Notes
1	Jack Beaumont; Jonathan Walton; John Collins; Peter Lambert	Great Britain	5:49.47	SA/B
2	Timo Piontek; Philipp Syring; Max Appel; Tim Grohmann	Germany	5:50.27	SA/B
3	Romano Battisti; Andrea Panizza; Giacomo Gentili; Emanuele Fiume	Italy	5:51.88	SA/B
4	Yuriy Ivanov; Oleksandr Lukianenko; Serhiy Hryn; Ivan Dovhodko	Ukraine	5:53.94	R
5	Jorge Patterson; Jesús Rodríguez Alfonso; Erick Vinet; Eduardo Rubio	Cuba	5:55.28	R

=== Repechage ===
The three fastest boats advanced to the A/B semifinals. The remaining boats were sent to the C final.

Rank	Rowers	Country	Time	Notes
1	Martin Helseth; Erik Solbakken; Jan Helvig; Nils Jakob Hoff	Norway	5:47.88	SA/B
2	Mickaël Marteau; Albéric Cormerais; Bastien Quiqueret; Maxime Ducret	France	5:49.04	SA/B
3	Yuriy Ivanov; Oleksandr Lukianenko; Serhiy Hryn; Ivan Dovhodko	Ukraine	5:51.78	SA/B
4	Yi Xudi; Liu Zhiyu; Zhang Liang; Zhang Quan	China	5:54.03	FC
5	Jorge Patterson; Jesús Rodríguez Alfonso; Erick Vinet; Eduardo Rubio	Cuba	5:58.42	FC
6	Leonard Futterman; Erik Frid; Lucas Wilhelm; Jonathan Kirkegaard	United States	6:02.24	FC

=== Semifinals ===
The three fastest boats in each semi advanced to the A final. The remaining boats were sent to the B final.

==== Semifinal 1 ====
Rank	Rowers	Country	Time	Notes
1	Jack Beaumont; Jonathan Walton; John Collins; Peter Lambert	Great Britain	5:47.63	FA
2	Romano Battisti; Andrea Panizza; Giacomo Gentili; Emanuele Fiume	Netherlands	5:49.16	FA
3	Dariusz Radosz; Wiktor Chabel; Dominik Czaja; Adam Wicenciak	Poland	5:49.67	FA
4	Mickaël Marteau; Albéric Cormerais; Bastien Quiqueret; Maxime Ducret	France	5:50.72	FB
5	Yuriy Ivanov; Oleksandr Lukianenko; Serhiy Hryn; Ivan Dovhodko	Ukraine	5:56.79	FB
6	Romano Battisti; Andrea Panizza; Giacomo Gentili; Emanuele Fiume	Italy	6:05.04	FB

==== Semifinal 2 ====
Rank	Rowers	Country	Time	Notes
1	Dovydas Nemeravičius; Martynas Džiaugys; Rolandas Maščinskas; Aurimas Adomavičius	Lithuania	5:48.61	FA
2	Kaur Kuslap; Allar Raja; Tõnu Endrekson; Kaspar Taimsoo	Estonia	5:50.10	FA
3	Martin Helseth; Erik Solbakken; Jan Helvig; Nils Jakob Hoff	Norway	5:50.28	FA
4	Giacomo Thomas; Nathan Flannery; Cameron Crampton; Lewis Hollows	New Zealand	5:52.60	FB
5	Andrey Potapkin; Alexander Vyazovkin; Nikolay Pimenov; Pavel Sorin	Russia	5:58.66	FB
6	Timo Piontek; Philipp Syring; Max Appel; Tim Grohmann	Germany	6:01.48	FB

=== Finals ===
The A final determined the rankings for places 1 to 6. Additional rankings were determined in the other finals.

==== Final C ====
Rank	Rowers	Country	Time
1	Yi Xudi; Liu Zhiyu; Zhang Liang; Zhang Quan	China	5:51.38
2	Jorge Patterson; Jesús Rodríguez Alfonso; Erick Vinet; Eduardo Rubio	Cuba	5:51.92
3	Leonard Futterman; Erik Frid; Lucas Wilhelm; Jonathan Kirkegaard	United States	5:57.98

==== Final B ====
Rank	Rowers	Country	Time
1	Giacomo Thomas; Nathan Flannery; Cameron Crampton; Lewis Hollows	New Zealand	5:46.21
2	Timo Piontek; Philipp Syring; Max Appel; Tim Grohmann	Germany	5:48.29
3	Mickaël Marteau; Albéric Cormerais; Bastien Quiqueret; Maxime Ducret	France	5:48.57
4	Andrey Potapkin; Alexander Vyazovkin; Nikolay Pimenov; Pavel Sorin	Russia	5:50.01
5	Yuriy Ivanov; Oleksandr Lukianenko; Serhiy Hryn; Ivan Dovhodko	Ukraine	5:51.14
6	Romano Battisti; Andrea Panizza; Giacomo Gentili; Emanuele Fiume	Italy	5:51.24

==== Final A ====
Rank	Rowers	Country	Time
1st place, gold medalist(s)	Dovydas Nemeravičius; Martynas Džiaugys; Rolandas Maščinskas; Aurimas Adomavičius	Lithuania	5:43.10
2nd place, silver medalist(s)	Jack Beaumont; Jonathan Walton; John Collins; Graeme Thomas	Great Britain	5:45.03
3rd place, bronze medalist(s)	Kaur Kuslap; Allar Raja; Tõnu Endrekson; Kaspar Taimsoo	Estonia	5:45.32
4	Abe Wiersma; Koen Metsemakers; Amos Keijser; Freek Robbers	Netherlands	5:45.82
5	Dariusz Radosz; Wiktor Chabel; Dominik Czaja; Adam Wicenciak	Poland	5:48.25
6	Martin Helseth; Erik Solbakken; Jan Helvig; Nils Jakob Hoff	Norway	5:48.29
