= Lithuanian Sportsperson of the Year =

Award for Lithuanian Athlete of the year

Since 1956, Lithuania honors their greatest athlete of the year. Until 2014 The award's trophy, a bronze archer, has been given to the winners. Since 2014 the award ceremony was changed with new categories added.

== Recipients ==
=== 1956 - 2014 ===
Year	Winner	Sport	Gender	Team of the Year
Overall
1956	Algirdas Šocikas	Boxing	M	
1957	Jonas Pipynė	Track and field	M	
1958	Birutė Kalėdienė	Track and field	W	
1959	Adolfas Varanauskas	Track and field	M	
1960	Antanas Bagdonavičius, Zigmas Jukna	Rowing	M	
1961	Antanas Bagdonavičius, Zigmas Jukna	Rowing	M	
1962	Antanas Vaupšas	Track and field	M	
1963	Adolfas Varanauskas	Track and field	M	
1964	Ričardas Tamulis	Boxing	M	
1965	Modestas Paulauskas	Basketball	M	
1966	Modestas Paulauskas	Basketball	M	
1967	Modestas Paulauskas	Basketball	M	
1968	Danas Pozniakas	Boxing	M	
1969	Modestas Paulauskas	Basketball	M	
1970	Modestas Paulauskas	Basketball	M	
1971	Modestas Paulauskas	Basketball	M	
1972	Modestas Paulauskas	Basketball	M	
1973	Vladas Česiūnas	Canoeing	M	
1974	Vladas Česiūnas	Canoeing	M	
1975	Česlovas Jazerskis	Wrestling	M	
1976	Angelė Rupšienė	Basketball	W	
1977	Vilhelmina Bardauskienė	Track and field	W	
1978	Vilhelmina Bardauskienė	Track and field	W	
1979	Lina Kačiušytė	Swimming	W	
1980	Lina Kačiušytė	Swimming	W	
1981	Robertas Žulpa	Swimming	M	
1982	Vladas Turla	Shooting	M	
1983	Ana Ambrazienė	Track and field	W	
1984	Arvydas Sabonis	Basketball	M	
1985	Arvydas Sabonis	Basketball	M	
1986	Arvydas Sabonis	Basketball	M	
1987	Šarūnas Marčiulionis	Basketball	M	
1988	Gintautas Umaras	Track cycling	M	
1989	Šarūnas Marčiulionis	Basketball	M	
1990	Šarūnas Marčiulionis	Basketball	M	
1991	Šarūnas Marčiulionis	Basketball	M	
1992	Romas Ubartas	Track and field	M	
1993	Vitalijus Karpačiauskas	Boxing	M	
1994	Raimundas Mažuolis	Swimming	M	
1995	Remigijus Lupeikis	Track cycling	M	
1996	Arvydas Sabonis	Basketball	M	
1997	Raimondas Šiugždinis	Sailing	M	
1998	Diana Žiliūtė	Road cycling	W	
1999	Edita Pučinskaitė	Road cycling	W	
2000	Virgilijus Alekna	Track and field	M	
2001	Rasa Polikevičiūtė	Road cycling	W	
2002	Raimondas Rumšas	Road cycling	M	
2003	Šarūnas Jasikevičius	Basketball	M	
2004	Virgilijus Alekna	Track and field	M	
2005	Virgilijus Alekna	Track and field	M	
2006	Virgilijus Alekna	Track and field	M	
2007	Ramūnas Šiškauskas	Basketball	M	
2008	Edvinas Krungolcas	Modern pentathlon	M	
2009	Simona Krupeckaitė	Track cycling	W	
2010	Simona Krupeckaitė	Track cycling	W	
2011	Laura Asadauskaitė	Modern pentathlon	W	
2012	Rūta Meilutytė	Swimming	W	
2013	Rūta Meilutytė	Swimming	W	National Men's Basketball Team

=== 2014 - 2019 ===
Year	Sportsman of the Year	Sportswoman of the Year	Men's Team of the Year	Women's Team of the Year
2014	Jevgenij Šuklin (canoe sprint)	Rūta Meilutytė (swimming)	National M2x (Ritter/Maščinskas)	National W2x (Valčiukaitė/Vištartaitė)
2015	Ramūnas Navardauskas (cycling)	Laura Asadauskaitė (modern pentathlon)	National Men's Basketball Team	National W2x (Valčiukaitė/Vištartaitė)
2016	Aurimas Didžbalis (weightlifting)	Simona Krupeckaitė (cycling)	National M2x (Ritter/Griškonis)	National W2x (Valčiukaitė/Vištartaitė)
2017	Andrius Gudžius (track and field)	Airinė Palšytė (athletics)	National M4x (Adomavičius/Maščinskas/Džiaugys/Nemeravičius)	National W2x (Valčiukaitė/Adomavičiūtė)
2018	Andrius Gudžius (track and field)	Rūta Meilutytė (swimming)	National M4x (Adomavičius/Maščinskas/Nemeravičius/Ritter)	National W2x (Valčiukaitė/Adomavičiūtė)
2019	Danas Rapšys (swimming)	Laura Asadauskaitė-Zadneprovskienė (modern pentathlon)	National Men's Basketball 3x3 Team (Beliavičius/Užupis/Vingelis/Pukelis)	National W2x Track Cycling Sprint Team (Krupeckaitė/Marozaitė)
2020	Was not selected due to COVID-19			

=== 2021 onwards ===
Year	Sportsman of the Year (Olympic sports)	Sportswoman of the Year (Olympic sports)	Team of the Year (Olympic sports)	Sportsman of the Year (Paralympic sports)	Sportswoman of the Year (Paralympic sports)	Team of the Year (Paralympic sports)
2021	Mindaugas Griškonis (rowing)	Laura Asadauskaitė-Zadneprovskienė (modern pentathlon)	National W2x (Valčiukaitė/Vištartaitė)	Edgaras Matakas (swimming)	Oksana Dobrovolskaja (track and field)	National Men's Goalball Team
2022	Mykolas Alekna (track and field)	Rūta Meilutytė (swimming)	National M2x (Maldonis/Olijnikas)	Edgaras Matakas (swimming)	Raimeda Bučinskytė (shooting)	National Wheelchair Basketball Team
2023	Mykolas Alekna (track and field)	Dominika Banevič (breaking)	National W2x (Karalienė/Rimkutė)	Rapolas Micevičius (snowboarding)	Raimeda Bučinskytė (shooting)	National Men's Goalball Team
2024	Mykolas Alekna (track and field)	Dominika Banevič (breaking)	Men's national 3x3 team	Osvaldas Bareikis (para judo)	Oksana Dobrovolskaja (athletics)	Aušra Garunkšnytė & Linas Mikalainis (marathon)
2025	Mykolas Alekna (track and field)	Rūta Meilutytė (swimming)	Men's national 3x3 team	Edgaras Matakas (swimming)	Oksana Dobrovolskaja (athletics)	—N/a
