= Princess Grace Challenge Cup =

Event at the Henley Royal Regatta

- Venue: Henley Royal Regatta, River Thames
- Location: Henley-on-Thames, Oxfordshire
- Dates: 2001 – present

The Princess Grace Challenge Cup is a rowing event for women's quadruple sculls at the annual Henley Royal Regatta on the Thames at Henley-on-Thames in England. It is open to female crews from all eligible rowing clubs. Two or more clubs may combine to make an entry.

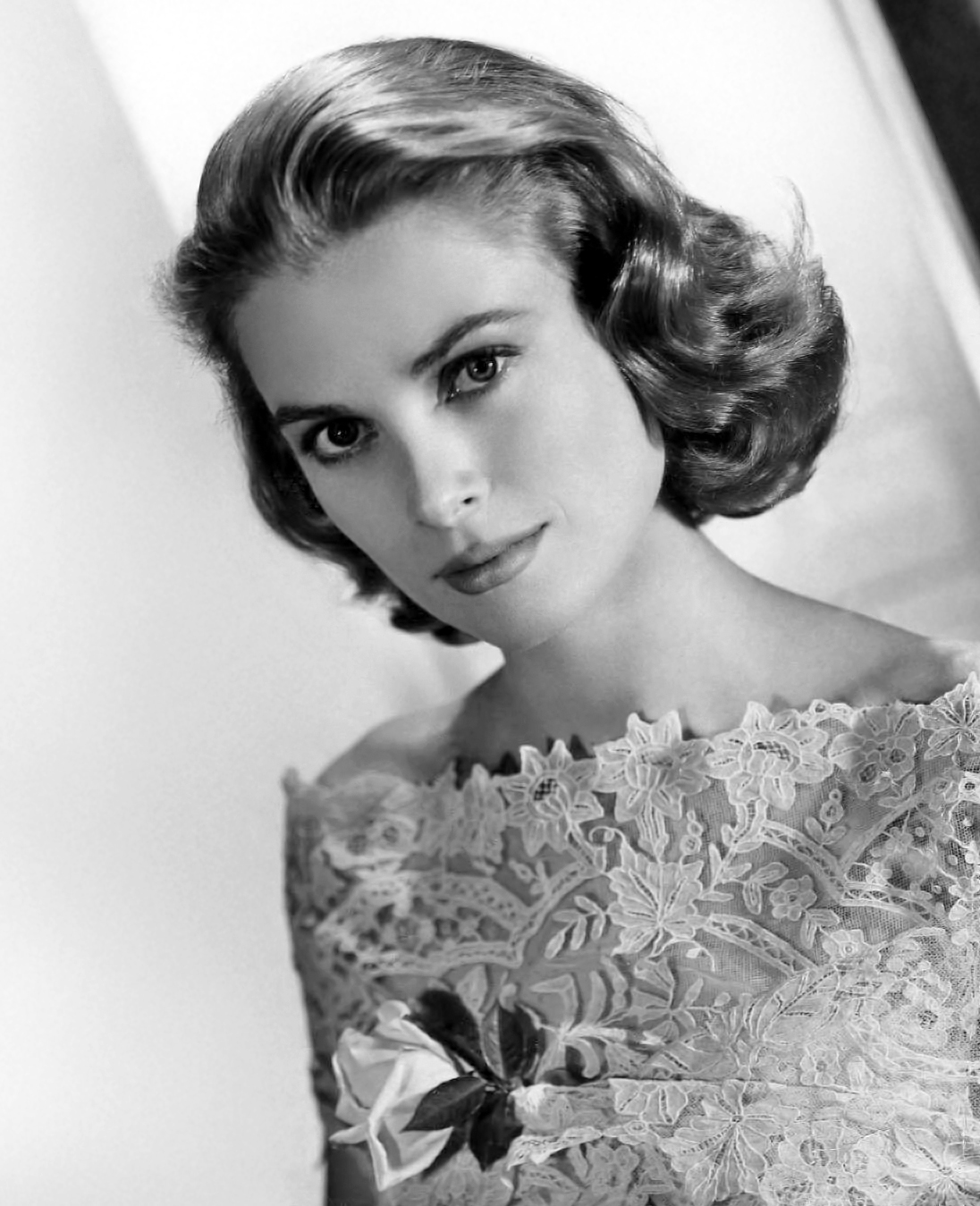
Grace Kelly

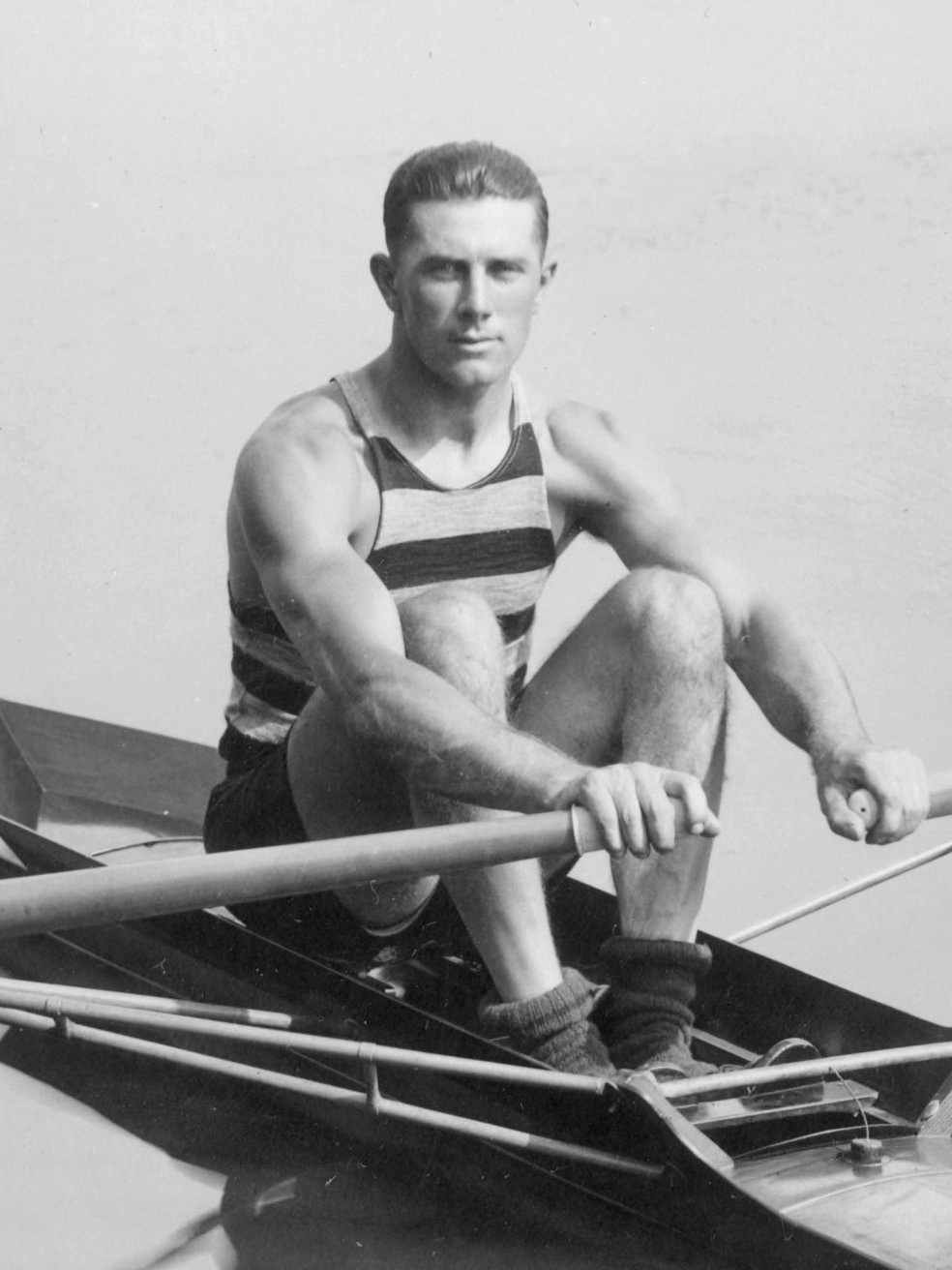
John Kelly, Sr

The event is named after Princess Grace of Monaco, who was the Academy Award-winning American actress Grace Kelly. Upon marrying Rainier III, Prince of Monaco in 1956, she became Her Serene Highness The Princess of Monaco, but was generally known as Princess Grace of Monaco. Her father John B. Kelly Sr. was an Olympic rowing gold medal winner, and her brother John B. Kelly Jr. won the Diamond Challenge Sculls at Henley in 1947 and 1949. A year before the Princess's death in 1982 she was invited to and presented the prizes of the Royal Regatta.

The event was incepted in 2001 and the cup was first presented in 2003 by the president of the Australian Olympic Committee John Coates. In 2004, the son of the Royal guest presenter, Prince Albert of Monaco did likewise, as to all prizes.

== Results ==
Year	Winner	Runner-Up	Ref
2001	Potsdamer Ruder-Gesellschaft e.V., Germany	Nautilus Rowing Club	
2003	TSSKA Ukraine	Australian Institute of Sport	
2004	Leander Club & University of London	TSSKA Ukraine	
2005	TSSKA Ukraine	Thames Rowing Club	
2006	Marlow Rowing Club & University of London	University of London	
2007	South Australian Institute of Sport	Hollandia Roeiclub	
2008	Wallingford Rowing Club & Reading University	Upper Thames Rowing Club	
2009	Leander Club & Westminster School	Waiariki Rowing Club, New Zealand	
2010	Gloucester Rowing Club & Leander Club	Waiariki Rowing Club, New Zealand	
2011	Princeton Training Center "B", USA	Australian Institute of Sport	
2012	National Rowing Centre of Excellence, Australia	Hollandia Roeiclub	
2013	Leander Club & Minerva Bath Rowing Club	California Rowing Club, U.S.A.	
2014	Leander Club & Gloucester Rowing Club	Gloucester Rowing Club & Northwich Rowing Club	
2015	Imperial College & Tees Rowing Club	Molesey Boat Club	
2016	Reading Rowing Club & Leander Club	AZS Warszawa & KW Wisła Grudziądz, Poland	
2017	Hollandia Roeiclub	Nottingham Rowing Club & Warrington Rowing Club	
2018	Cambridge University & Imperial College	Christiania RK	
2019	Chinese National Rowing Team	Hollandia Roeiclub	
2020	No competition due to COVID-19 pandemic		
2021	Leander Club	Thames & Neptune, Ireland	
2022	Chinese National Rowing Team	Rowing Australia	
2023	Leicester & Leander Club	Shawnigan Lake School	
2024	Shawnigan Lake School	Lausanne-Sports Aviron, Swi & Shawnigan Lake School, Can	
2025	Hollandia Roeiclub	RC Potsdam e.V & RC Germania Düsseldorf von 1904	
