= Sholto Carnegie =

British rower (born 1995)

Personal information
- Full name: Sholto Hector Hawkshaw Carnegie
- Nationality: British
- Born: 28 February 1995 (age 31) London, England
- Height: 1.96 m (6 ft 5 in)

Sport
- Country: Great Britain
- Sport: Rowing
- Event: Mens Eight
- Club: Leander Club
Medal record
Men's rowing
Representing Great Britain
Olympic Games
Gold medal – first place	2024 Paris	Eight
World Championships
Gold medal – first place	2022 Račice	Eight
Gold medal – first place	2023 Belgrade	Eight
Bronze medal – third place	2019 Ottensheim	Coxless four
European Championships
Gold medal – first place	2019 Lucerne	Coxless four
Gold medal – first place	2021 Varese	Coxless four
Gold medal – first place	2022 Oberschleißheim	Eight
Gold medal – first place	2023 Bled	Eight
Gold medal – first place	2024 Szeged	Eight

Sholto Hector Hawkshaw Carnegie (born 28 February 1995) is a British representative rower. He is an Olympic and a two-time world champion in the Great Britain men's eight.

== University and club rowing ==
Raised in Oxford and educated at Cherwell School, Carnegie took up rowing aged 13 at the City of Oxford Rowing Club. Ahead of the Henley Royal Regatta of 2013 Carnegie made a switch from the City of Oxford RC to the Marlow Rowing Club with whom he won the Fawley Challenge Cup that year. By 2014 he had moved again to the Leander Club and at Henley in 2014 he won the Prince of Wales Challenge Cup in a Leander quad scull.

Carnegie attended Yale University from 2014 to 2018 where he qualified for a B. Economics. At Yale he participated in their senior rowing program and rowed in senior Yale boats in all three racing seasons of his tenure including a seat in the Yale first VIII which won a national championship in 2016-17.

Back in England his club rowing has continued from Leander. In 2022, he won the Grand Challenge Cup (the blue riband event at the Henley Royal Regatta) in the four seat of a composite Leander/Oxford Brookes crew. In 2023 again in Leander Club colours, he was at four in the Leander/Oxford Brookes eight for another Grand Challenge Cup victory.

== Representative career ==
Carnegie was first selected to representative honours as a sculler, racing for Great Britain at the 2013 Junior World Rowing Championships in a double scull to a fifth placing. He was selected for the 2014 U23 World Rowing Championships in a quad scull which finished in overall 13th place. By 2016 Carnegie had moved into sweep oared boats and he won silver medals at the U23 World Championships of 2016 (in the 8+) and 2017 (in the 4-).

2018 saw Carnegie move in the GB senior squad but he made only one representative appearance in the 2018 European racing season in a 4- which finished fourth at World Rowing Cup III. 2019 was more successful for Carnegie. He won a gold medal in the coxless four at the 2019 European Rowing Championships with Oliver Cook, Matthew Rossiter and Rory Gibbs then that same crew won a bronze medal at the 2019 World Rowing Championships.

That crew of Carnegie, Cook, Rossiter and Gibbs stayed together throughout the Covid lost season of 2020 whilst knowing their 2019 performances had qualified the boat for the eventual 2020 Tokyo Olympics. In 2021, they won a second European gold medal as a 4- in Varese, Italy, then took gold at the World Rowing Cup II. At the Tokyo Olympic regatta they won their heat, comfortably beating the eventual bronze medallists Italy. In the Olympic final they were in medal contention at each mark but were run down by the Italians in the last 500m and finished in fourth place.

2022 saw Carnegie selected to the four seat of the Great Britain senior men's eight. In that international season the eight won gold at two World Rowing Cups and at the 2022 European Rowing Championships. Carnegie in the British eight went on to win gold and a world championship title at the 2022 World Rowing Championships in Račice. In 2023 Carnegie won a second successive world championship in the men's eight at the 2023 World Rowing Championships in Belgrade.

He won a gold medal as part of the Great Britain eight at the 2024 Summer Olympics.
