= Queen Mother Challenge Cup =

Rowing competition

- Venue: Henley Royal Regatta, River Thames
- Location: Henley-on-Thames, Oxfordshire
- Dates: 1981–present

The Queen Mother Challenge Cup is a rowing event for men's quadruple sculls at the annual Henley Royal Regatta on the River Thames at Henley-on-Thames in England.

It is open to male crews from all eligible rowing clubs. Two or more clubs may combine to make an entry.

== Past winners ==
| Year | Winner | Runner-up | Ref |
|---|---|---|---|
| 1981 | RV Ingelheim & Ulm RC Donau | Maidenhead & Marlow | |
| 1982 | Marlow & Thames Tradesmen's | Lea Rowing Club | |
| 1983 | Kingston Rowing Club | Hamburg & Germania | |
| 1984 | Maidenhead & Bewdley | Quintin Boat Club | |
| 1985 | Bewdley & Thames Tradesmen's | Tideway Scullers School | |
| 1986 | Tideway Scullers School & Northampton | Rob Roy Boat Club | |
| 1987 | Ridley Boat Club, Canada | Soviet Army | |
| 1988 | Melbourne Univ. & Univ. Queensland | Nautilus | |
| 1989 | SC Eridanea & SC Firenze, Italy | Kubanj Krasnodar, USSR | |
| 1990 | Danmarks Rocenter Roklub | Nereus Rowing Club | |
| 1991 | Leander Club & Tideway Scullers School | NCRA | |
| 1992 | Stromstads Ruddklubb, Sweden | NCRA | |
| 1993 | Tideway Scullers School & Nottingham City | NCRA & Goldie | |
| 1994 | Rv Treviris & Hallescher Rv Bolllberg, Germany | London Rowing Club | |
| 1995 | Augusta Training Center, USA | Dinamo Moscow, Russia | |
| 1996 | Mainzer & Neusser RV, Germany | Ratzeburg RC, Germany | |
| 1997 | Augusta SC, USA | Queen's Tower & Poplar, Blackwall & District | |
| 1998 | Augusta SC, USA | Commercial RC, Ireland | |
| 1999 | Allemannia RC, Hamburg | Augusta SC Center, USA | |
| 2000 | Nereus Rowing Club & Laga, Netherlands | Australian Institute of Sport | |
| 2001 | Leander Club | London Rowing Club | |
| 2002 | Leander Club & London University | Leander Club & Molesey | |
| 2003 | Gdansk and Warszawa, Poland | TS.S.K.A. Ukraine | |
| 2004 | TS.S.K.A. Ukraine | Leander Club & Molesey | |
| 2005 | A.Z.S. Szczecin & A.Z.S. Gorzow, Poland | Leander Club & Tideway Scullers School | |
| 2006 | Club France | Commercial & Offaly, Ireland | |
| 2007 | A.Z.S. Gdansk & A.Z.S. Szczecin, Poland | Brentwood College & UVIC, Canada | |
| 2008 | RC Viljandi & RC Narva Energia, Estonia | California R.C | |
| 2009 | A.Z.S. Szczecin & A.Z.S. Gorzow, Poland | Leander Club & Reading University | |
| 2010 | Leander Club & Reading University | Princeton Training Center, U.S.A. | |
| 2011 | Leander Club & Reading University | C.A.RC Mladost & RC Tresnjevka, Croatia | |
| 2012 | National Rowing Centre of Excellence, Australia | Victoria City R.C., Canada | |
| 2013 | Leander Club & Reading University | Waiariki R.C, New Zealand | |
| 2014 | Leander Club & Agecroft | National Training Centre, Australia | |
| 2015 | Leander Club & Agecroft | Rostock RC 1885 & Potsdam Rowing Society | |
| 2016 | Leander Club | California R.C | |
| 2017 | Leander Club | Waiariki R.C, New Zealand | |
| 2018 | Leander Club & Agecroft | Fana Roklubb Norway | |
| 2019 | Leander Club | Frankfurter Rudergesellschaft Germania 1869 | |
| 2020 | No competition due to COVID-19 pandemic | | |
| 2021 | Leander Club | University College, Cork & Skibbereen R.C, Ireland | |
| 2022 | Chinese National Rowing Team | Texas Rowing Center & Vesper Boat Club, USA | |
| 2023 | Nottingham & Leander | Akademicki Zwiazek Sportowy Torun & Wloclawskie Towarzystwo Wioslarskie, Pol | |
| 2024 | Leander Club | RC Normannia Braunschweig e.V. & SC Magdeburg e.V. Abteilung Rudern, Ger | |
| 2025 | Nottingham & Leander | Rowing Australia | |
