= Town Challenge Cup =

Annual women's rowing competition at Henley-on-Thames, UK

- Venue: Henley Royal Regatta, River Thames
- Location: Henley-on-Thames, Oxfordshire
- Dates: 2017 – present

Town Challenge Cup is a rowing event for women's coxless fours at the annual Henley Royal Regatta on the River Thames at Henley-on-Thames in England.

The event is open to members of any club established at least one year before the closing date for entries. It was inaugurated in 2017 and is not to be confused with the former men's event of the same name that ran from 1839 until 1883.

== Past winners ==
Year	Winner	Runner-Up	Time	Ref
2017	Hollandia Roeiclub	New York AC	7.14	
2018	University of London & Leander Club	Molesey	7.22	
2019	Hollandia Roeiclub	Chinese National Rowing Team	7.58	
2020	No competition due to COVID-19 pandemic			
2021	Leander A	Leander B	7.58	
2022	Waiariki	Danmarks Rocenter	7.14	
2023	Leander Club	Leander and Imperial College	7.38	
2024	Rowing Canada	Leander	7.52	
2025	Hollandia Roeiclub	Leander & Reading University	7.04	
