= Bewdley Rowing Club =

Rowing club in England

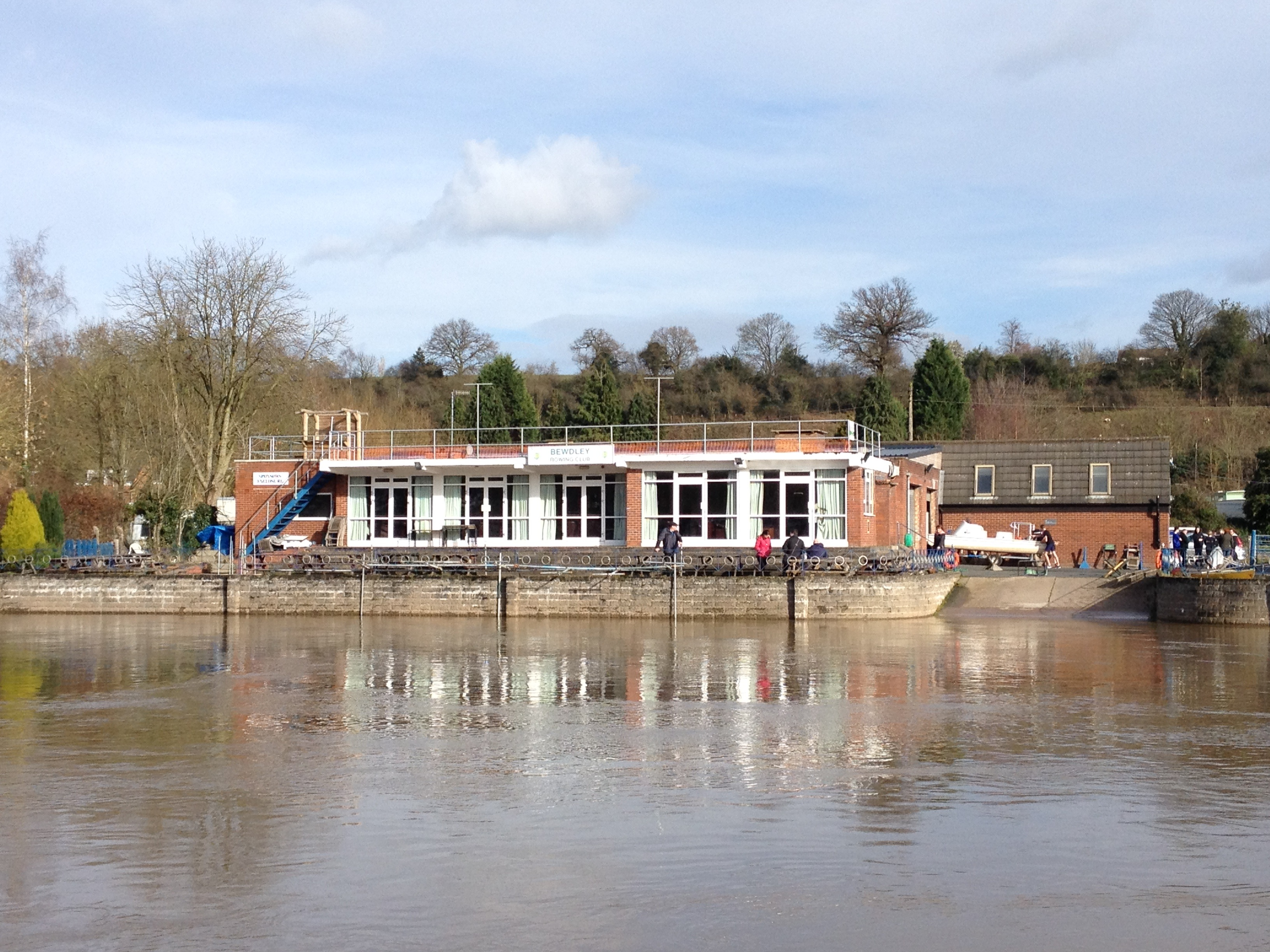

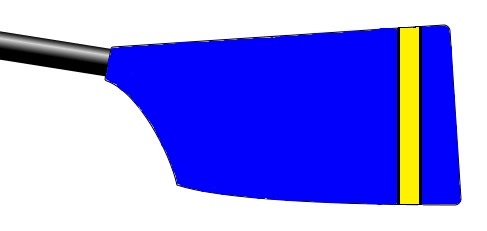
- Location: Riverside North, Wribbenhall, Bewdley, Wyre Forest District, West Midlands, England
- Coordinates: 52.377859°N 2.315298°W
- Founded: 1877
- Affiliations: British Rowing (boat code BEW)
- Website: www.bewdleyrc.co.uk

Bewdley Rowing Club is a rowing club on the River Severn, based at Riverside North, Wribbenhall, Bewdley, Wyre Forest District, West Midlands, England. The club is open to all age groups and the blade colours are blue and gold; kit: indigo with a (quite broad) gold band.

== History ==
The club was founded in 1877 although newspaper reports at the time state that it was the revival of the club.

The club won the prestigious Double Sculls Challenge Cup at the Henley Regatta with the Leander Club in 1983 and the Queen Mother Challenge Cup with the Maidenhead Rowing Club in 1984 and Thames Tradesmen's Rowing Club in 1985.

== Honours ==
=== Henley Royal Regatta ===
| Year | Races won |
|---|---|
| 1983 | Double Sculls Challenge Cup |
| 1984 | Queen Mother Challenge Cup |
| 1985 | Queen Mother Challenge Cup |

=== British champions ===
| Year | Races won |
|---|---|
| 1979 | Men J16 1x |
| 1980 | Men 4x |
| 1991 | Women J16 1x |
| 1995 | Women J18 1x |
