= Sam Townsend =

British rower (born 1985)

Personal information
- Nationality: British
- Born: 26 November 1985 (age 40) Reading

Sport
- Club: Reading University BC
Medal record
Men's Rowing
Representing Great Britain
World Championships
Silver medal – second place	2014 Amsterdam	M4x
Bronze medal – third place	2013 Chungjiu	M4x
European Championships
Silver medal – second place	2014 Belgrade	M4x
Bronze medal – third place	2015 Poznan	M4x

Sam Townsend (born 26 November 1985 in Reading) is a British rower who competed at the 2012 Summer Olympics and 2016 Summer Olympics.

== Rowing career ==
Townsend competed in the double sculls with Bill Lucas at the 2012 Olympic Games rowing events, finishing in fifth place.

He competed at the 2013 World Rowing Championships in Chungju, where he won a bronze medal as part of the quad sculls with Graeme Thomas, Charles Cousins and Peter Lambert. The following year he competed at the 2014 World Rowing Championships in Bosbaan, Amsterdam, where he won a silver medal as part of the quadruple sculls with Thomas, Cousins and Lambert.

In 2016 he went to his second Olympic Games competing in the quadruple sculls with Jack Beaumont, Angus Groom and Peter Lambert.

== Personal life ==
His wife, Natasha Page, is also an Olympic rower.
