= The Boat Race 2011 =

157th Boat Race
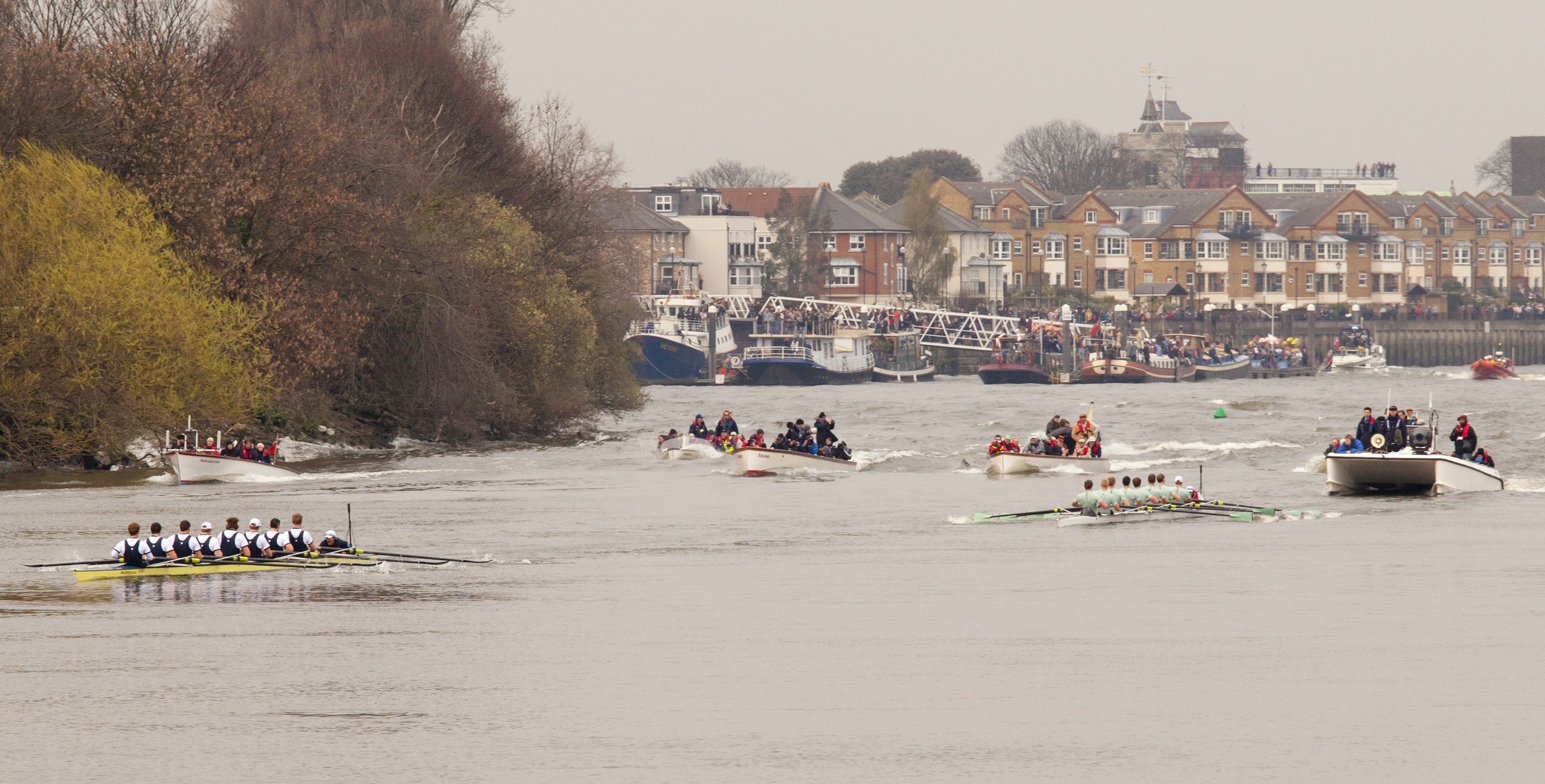
- Oxford leading Cambridge heading towards the Bandstand
- Date: 26 March 2011
- Winner: Oxford
- Margin of victory: 4 lengths
- Winning time: 17 minutes 32 seconds
- Overall record (Cambridge–Oxford): 80–76
- Umpire: Rob Clegg

Other races
- Reserve winner: Isis
- Women's winner: Oxford

The 157th Boat Race took place on 26 March 2011. Held annually, the event is a side-by-side rowing race between crews from the Universities of Oxford and Cambridge along the River Thames. The race was won by Oxford. Of the eighteen competitors in the race, thirteen were British. The race was sponsored for the second time by Xchanging.

Oxford won the Women's Boat Race by four lengths while Cambridge's Goldie beat Oxford's Isis in the reserve race.

== Background ==
The Championship Course along which the race is rowed

The Boat Race is a side-by-side rowing competition between the University of Oxford and the University of Cambridge. First held in 1829, the competition is a 4.2-mile (6.8 km) race along The Championship Course on the River Thames in southwest London. The rivalry is a major point of honour between the two universities and followed throughout the United Kingdom and worldwide. Cambridge went into the race as reigning champions, having won the 2010 race by 1 1/3 lengths, and led overall with 80 victories to Oxford's 75 (excluding the "dead heat" of 1877). The race was sponsored by Xchanging for the seventh consecutive year, and it was the second time that the title had been given over to sponsorship. It was referred to as the "Xchanging Boat Race". The BBC broadcast the event in the United Kingdom, in high-definition for the first time.

The first Women's Boat Race took place in 1927, but did not become an annual fixture until the 1960s. Until 2014, the contest was conducted as part of the Henley Boat Races, but as of the 2015 race, it is held on the River Thames, on the same day as the men's main and reserve races. The reserve race, contested between Oxford's Isis boat and Cambridge's Goldie boat has been held since 1965. It usually takes place on the Tideway, prior to the main Boat Race.

== Crews ==
The Cambridge crew was "slightly heavier" than their opponents, weighing in at a ceremony at City Hall overseen by Boris Johnson at 3.5 pounds (1.6 kg) more per rower than Oxford. Thirteen of the eighteen competitors were British, the highest proportion for a decade. Of the two crews, Cambridge featured three returning Blues to Oxford's one. Oxford University Boat Club's president Ben Myers suggested "we're home-grown guys, we know about the Boat Race and we're keen". Oxford were coached once again by Sean Bowden, who set their boat up as "tandem rigged" (where two consecutive crew row on the same side of the boat), the first time such a configuration had been used in the Boat Race since 1975. Steve Trapmore was making his debut as Cambridge's coach. Oxford's stroke, Simon Hislop, had recovered from testicular cancer in time to participate in the race.

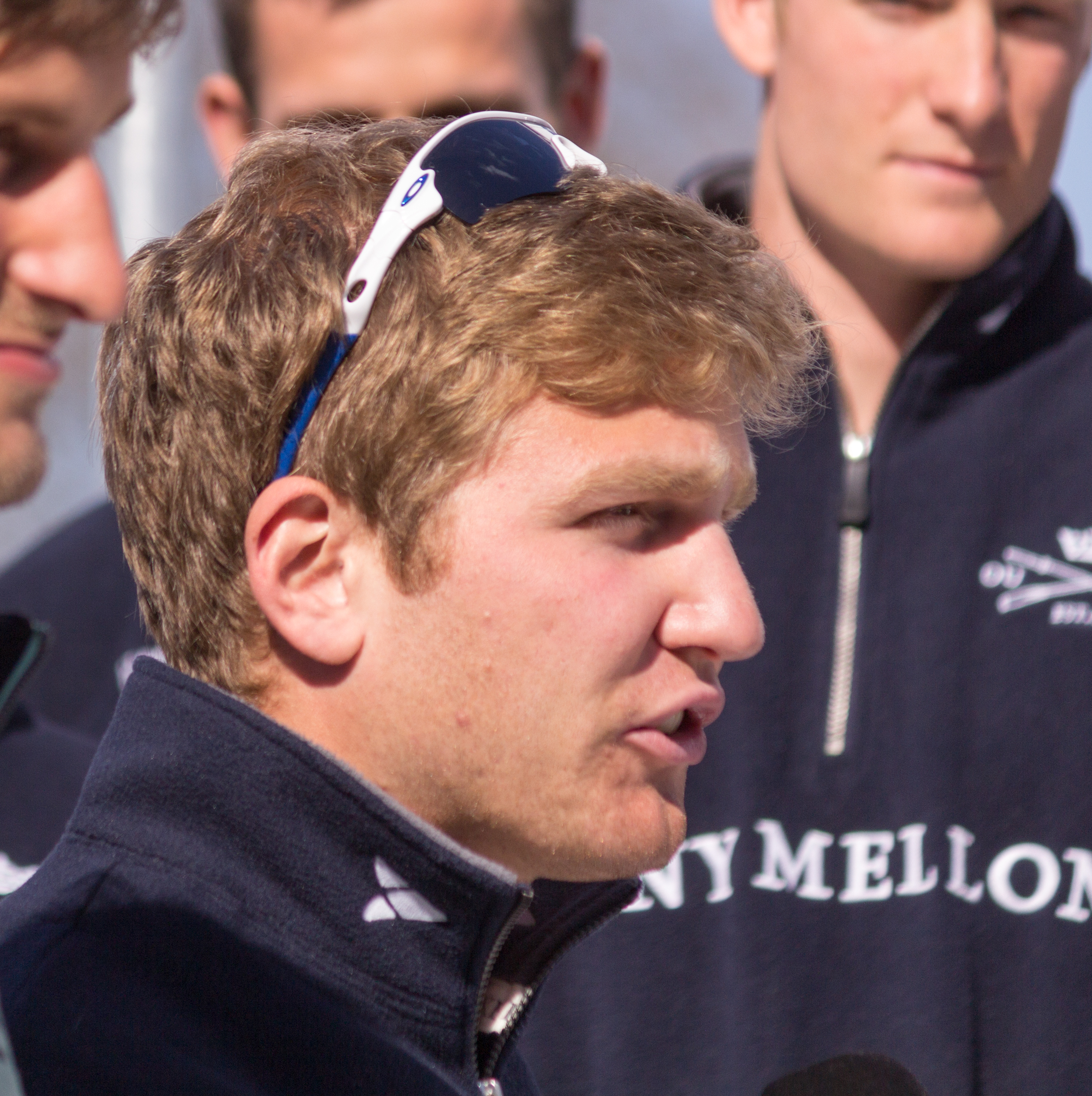
Constantine Louloudis (pictured in 2015) rowed at number 6 for Oxford.

Seat	Oxford					Cambridge				
Seat	Name	College	Age	Nationality	Weight	Name	College	Age	Nationality	Weight
Bow	Moritz Hafner	Oriel	26	German/Swiss	12 st 9 lb	Mike Thorp	Homerton	20	British	13 st 13 lb
2	Ben Myers (P)	Exeter	21	British	15 st 6 lb	Joel Jennings	Clare	23	British	15 st 6 lb
3	Alec Dent	Keble	21	British/French	14 st 2 lb	Dan Rix-Standing	St Catharine's	20	British	14 st 0 lb
4	Ben Ellison	St Anne's	22	British	14 st 11 lb	Hardy Cubasch	St Edmund's	30	Australian	15 st 10 lb
5	Karl Hudspith	St Peter's	22	British	14 st 8 lb	George Nash	St Catharine's	21	British	15 st 5 lb
6	Constantine Louloudis	Trinity	19	British	14 st 10 lb	Geoff Roth	St Edmund's	23	Canadian	15 st 6 lb
7	George Whittaker	Oriel	29	British	13 st 10 lb	Derek Rasmussen (P)	Hughes Hall	23	American	12 st 11 lb
Stroke	Simon Hislop	Oriel	26	British	14 st 8 lb	David Nelson	Hughes Hall	27	Australian	14 st 13 lb
Cox	Sam Winter-Levy	New College	18	British	8 st 9 lb	Liz Box	Hughes Hall	23	British/Australian	8 st 4 lb
Source: (P) – boat club president

== Races ==
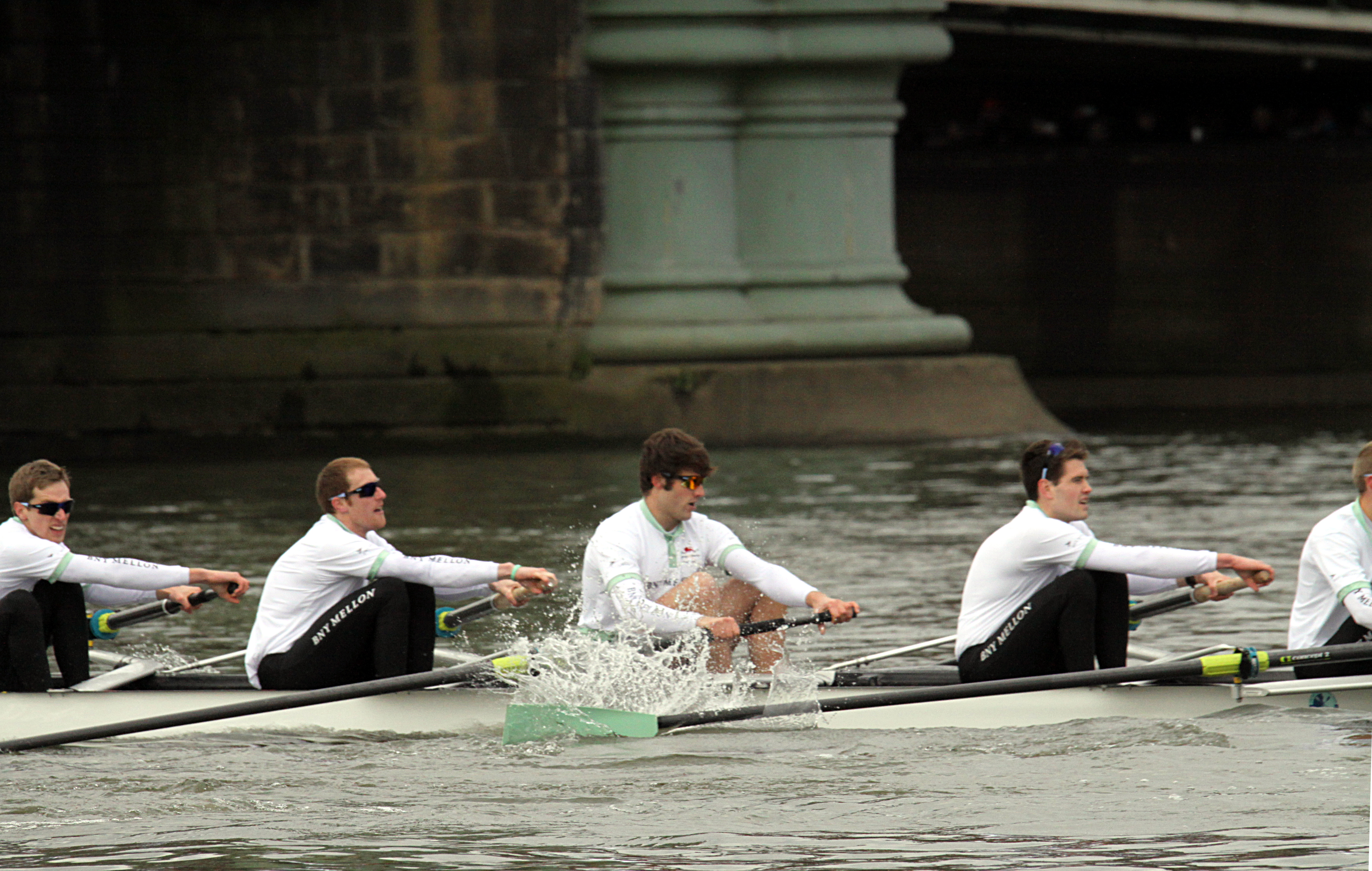
George Nash (second left) rowing with Cambridge in 2013

Oxford won the toss and elected to start from the Surrey station. Despite falling slightly behind early on in the race, Cambridge rowed their way back into contention and umpire Rob Clegg was forced to warn both crews as the coxes steered towards one another. Following a brief clash of oars, Oxford started to pull away again at Harrods Furniture Depository. At Hammersmith Bridge, the Oxford cox called for push, shouting "2003" to invoke memories of the narrowest margin of victory in the history of the event in the 2003 race. Passing St Paul's School, Oxford took the lead and steered across and in front of the Cambridge boat. Despite attempts to keep in touch with Oxford, Cambridge fell further and further behind, and Oxford passed the finishing post four lengths clear in a time of 17 minutes and 37 seconds.

Oxford won the 66th Women's Boat Race by four lengths, their third consecutive victory. Oxford's Isis beat Cambridge's Goldie in the reserve race by six lengths.

== Reaction ==
Cambridge number four Henry Cubasch remarked "They had the strength, character and went for it; we just let them slip." Oxford's Constantine Louloudis said "We held Cambridge in high regard. But I certainly didn't predict a margin like that." Cambridge president Rasumussen called it a "stinging defeat".
