= Prince of Wales Challenge Cup =

Annual rowing competition in England

- Venue: Henley Royal Regatta, River Thames
- Location: Henley-on-Thames, Oxfordshire
- Dates: 2008 – present

The Prince of Wales Challenge Cup is a rowing event for men's quadruple sculls at the annual Henley Royal Regatta on the River Thames at Henley-on-Thames in England. It is open to male crews from all eligible rowing clubs and has similar qualifying rules to the Ladies' Challenge Plate. Two or more clubs may combine to make an entry.

The trophy was donated to the regatta in 2007 by Mr. V. G. Saunders and was the prize awarded to the winner of the 1931 King's Cup Aero Race - E. C. T. Edwards, the brother of H. R. A. (Jumbo) Edwards.

== Past winners ==
Year	Winner	Runner-Up	Ref
2008	California Rowing Club, U.S.A	Leander Club & London Rowing Club	
2009	Oxford Brookes Univ & Durham Univ	Leander Club	
2010	Leander Club	Tideway Scullers School	
2011	Leander Club	Tideway Scullers School	
2012	Leander Club	Durham Univ & Univ of London	
2013	Leander Club	Aalesunds Roklub and Moss Roklubb, Norway	
2014	Leander Club	RTHC Bayer Leverkusen, Germany	
2015	Leander Club	Leander Club & Oxford Brookes Univ	
2016	Schuylkill Navy, USA	Leander Club A	
2017	Leander Club A	Leander Club B	
2018	A.A.S.R. Skøll, Netherlands	Edinburgh Univ & Nottingham Rowing Club	
2019	Edinburgh Univ & Nottingham RC	A.A.S.R. Skøll & A.U.S.R. Orca, Netherlands	
2020	No competition due to COVID-19 pandemic		
2021	Leander Club	Twickenham & Queen's University, Belfast	
2022	Leander Club	Reading University Boat Club	
2023	Leander Club	Hollandia Roeiclub, Netherlands	
2024	Leander Club	A.A.S.R. Skøll, Netherlands	
2025	Bonner RG e.V. and Erster Kieler RC e.V., Germany	Marlow	
