= Bill Lucas (rower) =

British rower (born 1987)

Personal information
- Nationality: British (English)
- Born: 13 September 1987 (age 39) Exeter, England

Sport
- Country: Great Britain
- Sport: Rowing
- Event: double sculls
- Club: London Rowing Club

Achievements and titles
- Olympic finals: London 2012

William P. Lucas (born 13 September 1987 in Exeter) is a British rower. He competed with Sam Townsend in the double sculls at the 2012 Summer Olympics and finished fifth. He attended Towerhouse School for primary school education and Torquay Boys Grammar school for secondary education.

In 2013 rowing with Matt Langridge, he finished runner-up behind Michael Arms and Robbie Manson of New Zealand in the Double Sculls Challenge Cup at the Henley Royal Regatta.
