= Agecroft Rowing Club =

British rowing club

Agecroft R.C.
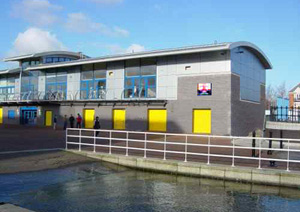

- Location: Salford Quays, Salford, England
- Home water: Manchester Ship Canal, Salford Quays
- Founded: 1861
- Affiliations: British Rowing boat code – AGE
- Website: www.agecroftrc.org.uk

Events
- Agecroft Small Boats Head

Agecroft Rowing Club is a rowing club based at Salford Quays, Greater Manchester, England. It was formerly based close to the Agecroft Hall in Pendleton 2 miles (3.2 km) north. Its current location is its third within today's City of Salford on a site close to the city centre of Manchester.

== History ==
There has been rowing in Manchester and Salford since 1823, with more than 15 clubs operating during the 1860s. Agecroft R.C. was formed by the gradual merging of these River Irwell-based clubs. Agecroft R.C. was established in Oct 1861 by Ishmael Lythgoe with its first boat house in the grounds of Agecroft Hall at Pendlebury before the manor house was sold and rebuilt by the James River in Virginia, USA. The club soon moved to the River Irwell further upstream at Littleton Road and were based there for over a hundred years. However, in early 2000s, the stretch of river had been allowed to return more to reeds to support fishing and the boathouse lay on part of a new flood plain so the club moved to a new boathouse close to Manchester City Centre at Salford Quays. This new home triggered a huge growth in club size and successes throughout the UK.

== Current activities ==
The club regularly competes across the UK at all levels and has a broad membership base, from complete novices and juniors through to semi-professional athletes competing at international level. The club regularly hosts a small boats head race in the winter and supports a British Rowing world class start coach.

The club hosts a wide variety of rowers of different abilities, ambitions and ages, with a large membership and a wide variety of members from juniors through students to masters. The club has achieved qualifications and wins at the British Rowing Championships, Nottingham and Henley Royal Regatta and a course record at both Henley Royal Regatta in 4x and Henley Women's Regatta in the Intermediate 4+ event. They have won trophies at the prestigious Head of the River (multiple Jackson trophies plus Senior, Senior 2 and IM3 classes) and Women's Head of the River (Senior and Provincial twice). Multiple wins at the 4s Head have also been achieved, including Club4+, 4- and 4xs.

=== International performances ===
The club has been successful in the World Class Start squad with wins in the World Under 23s coxless pairs and a Home Countries win for England in the single sculls by Olivia Whitlam who has since gone on to represent GB at the 2008 and 2012 Olympics and the three intervening World Championships. Other internationals since 2010 include Brendan Crean (4x (Note: Quad, for other symbols used (+ and -) see Rowing (sport)) 2010), Graeme Thomas (World Cup win Australia 2013), Zak Lee-Green (lwt 4x u23 bronze 2010), Oli Lee (GB U23 4x 2010), Rebecca Chin (GB U23 eight Bronze, 2012) and Olivia Oakes (GB U23 eight bronze 2012). Both Brendan (England) and Graeme (Wales) have also won National Championship gold medals in 1x and Home Countries Internationals. Graeme has gone on to represent GB at 7 World Championships, and 10 European Championships. He missed the Rio Olympics due to ill health, but was named as part of the GB Rowing Team for Tokyo 2021 and Paris 2024 after winning a bronze medal in the 2021 European Championships held in Varese. Zak Lee Green is another successful Agecroft graduate and was part of the GB Lightweight team, having been to 5 World Championships winning a silver in LM4x. Olivia Whitlam won u23 Worlds Championship Gold in 2- and then graduated to World and Olympic Games, coming 4th in 2 Games.

Daniele Gilardoni (Note: 11-times World Gold medallist in lwt 4x) joined Agecroft in February 2013 where he rowed and coached.

=== Henley Royal Regatta ===
At HRR, under the coaching of Denis O'Neill, the club, in successive years lost a semi-final by one foot, then a Final, then a semi-final, after which Agecroft won for the first time The Britannia Challenge Cup (Note: Liz O'Neill (cox)/Craig Morgan/Pete Warman/Tom Dawson/Ben Sullivan) in 2009 and lost the final of the Visitors in a composite with Reading Uni.They also lost semis in 2011 and 2017.

Other results:

- Brendan Crean reached the semi-final of the 1x Diamond Challenge Sculls ('the Diamonds'), 2010
- An Agecroft World Class Start 4x reached the semi-final Prince of Wales Challenge Cup, 2011 setting a course record.
- Graeme Thomas reached the final of the Diamonds, 2012, he won the Queen Mother Cup in 2014, 2015 and 2018. He won Double Sculls Challenge Cup in 2019 and the Diamond Challenge Sculls in 2021.

=== Henley Women's Regatta ===
Recent successes include the following wins

- 2010 Sen 1x in a course record
- 2011 Elite 8+ (composite)
- 2012 Elite 8+ (composite)
- 2013 Elite 4- (composite)
- 2014 Elite 8+ and Elite LW4x (both composite)
- 2016 Senior 4x
- 2018 Development 4+ and Junior 1x
- 2021 Development 4+

=== Junior rowing ===
The junior section of Agecroft was restarted in earnest in the 2000s with dedicated junior club officers and has over 60 members racing locally and at British Junior Rowing Championships.

=== Masters/Veteran rowing ===
Veteran rowing was particularly strong in 80s and 90s with 15 World Masters wins and multiple Nat Champ wins, particularly in 8s, 4+s and 4xs. They also won Vesta Vets Head and Henley Masters.

The Masters squad was reformed in 2006/7 after the considerable success of the Agecroft Veteran squad in the 90's. From a starting point of just two members, the masters squad has circa 20 members with strong performances in the 40-60 age groups (D to E racing categories) at local, regional and national events. The squad has recorded the following wins at the British Masters Rowing Championships

- Open B4- in 2015, 2016 and 2017,
- Open C8+ in 2019
- Open C4- in 2021.
- Open D4- and Open Lwt E 1x in 2023
- Open D8+ in 2024

At Henley Masters Regatta there have been wins in

- Open B4- in 2017,
- Open B8+ in 2018
- Open C4- in 2023

whilst they were finalists in Open B8+ 2019, Open C4- 2021 and Open C8+ 2022

== Honours ==
=== British champions ===
Year	Winning crew/s
1994	Women lightweight 2x
2007	Open 1x
2009	Open 2x, Women 4-, Women J18 2-
2010	Women U23 1x (course record)
2011	Open 1x, Open 2x
2014	Open 4x, Open LWT2x
2017	Women J18 1x
2018	Open 4x (club), Women J18 1x
2025	Women club 4+
2026	Women adaptive AR1/2 1x

=== Henley Royal Regatta ===
Year	Races won
2009	Britannia Challenge Cup
2014	Queen Mother Challenge Cup
2015	Queen Mother Challenge Cup
2018	Queen Mother Challenge Cup
2019	Double Sculls Challenge Cup
2021	Diamond Challenge Sculls

== Notable members ==
Kevin Maynard Steve Hitchin Denis O'Neill

- Rebecca Chin
- Zak Lee-Green
- Graeme Thomas
- Olivia Whitlam

== Gallery ==
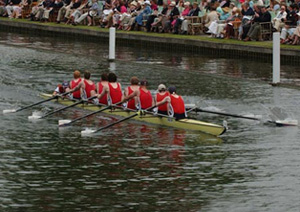
Senior Men at Henley

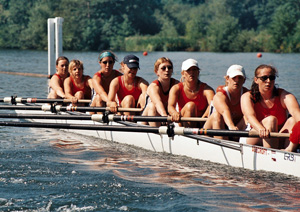
Women's Henley 8+

== Notes and references ==
Notes
