= Andrey Potapkin =

Russian rower

Personal information
- Nationality: Russia
- Born: 12 July 1996 (age 28)

Sport
- Sport: Rowing

Andrey Potapkin (born 12 July 1996) is a Russian rower. He competed in the 2020 Summer Olympics.
