= Emanuele Fiume =

Italian rower

Personal information
- National team: Italy
- Born: 17 May 1997 (age 29) Fasano, Italy
- Height: 1.93 m (6 ft 4 in)
- Weight: 96 kg (212 lb)

Sport
- Country: Italy
- Sport: Rowing
- Club: Fiamme Gialle
- Start activity: 2006
Medal record
Men's rowing
Representing Italy
World U23 Championships
Bronze medal – third place	2016 Rotterdam	Quadruple sculls
Bronze medal – third place	2017 Plovdiv	Quadruple sculls
World Junior Championships
Gold medal – first place	2015 Rio de Janeiro	Double sculls
Silver medal – second place	2013 Trakai	Eight
European Championships
Bronze medal – third place	2017 Račice	Quadruple sculls

Emanuele Fiume (born 17 May 1997) is an Italian rower.
