= Sir William Borlase's Grammar School Boat Club =

British rowing club

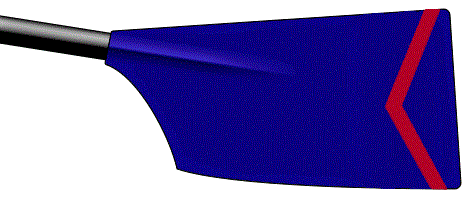
- Location: Longridge, Quarry Wood Road, (until December 2025) Marlow
- Coordinates: 51.564311°N 0.760862°W
- Founded: 1921
- Affiliations: British Rowing boat code - SWB
- Website: www.borlaserowing.com

Sir William Borlase's Grammar School Boat Club is a rowing club on the River Thames based at Longridge, Quarry Wood Road, Marlow. The club belongs to the Sir William Borlase's Grammar School.

== History ==
The club was formed in 1921.

The club shared the boathouse facility at Longridge Activity Centre on Quarry Wood Road, with Great Marlow School Boat Club when the latter moved there in 2009.

From 2012 to 2015, the club won the prestigious Fawley Challenge Cup three times at the Henley Royal Regatta.

The facilities for rowing at the Longridge Outdoor Activity Centre were limited with boats being operated from outdoor racks, which led to a 20 year search at 15 locations before an application for a new boathouse was submitted at Gossmore Lane on the opposite side of the river. The facility called the Marlow and District Schools Boathouse is due to open in December 2025. The construction met with some controversy over using Green belt land to build the boathouse.

In 2025, the club won its first national title since 2017, at the 2025 British Rowing Club Championships.

== Honours ==
=== British champions ===
Year	Winning crew
1984	Men J16 2x
1986	Men J16 4-
1988	Men J16 4+, Men J16 4-
1993	Men J14 4x
1994	Women J15 4x
1995	Men J16 4x
1996	Men 4x
2003	Women J16 2x
2008	Open J18 4x, Women J18 4x, Women J16 2x
2010	OJ16 4-, WJ18 2x, WJ16 1x, WJ16 4x
2011	W4-, OJ14 4x+, WJ18 2x, WJ16 4+
2012	J18 4+ WJ16 4 +
2014	O4x
2017	OJ15 4x+
2025	Open J16 2x

Key= O Open, W Women, +coxed, -coxless, x sculls, J junior, 18 16 age group

=== Henley Royal Regatta ===
Year	Races won
1984	Visitors' Challenge Cup
2012	Fawley Challenge Cup
2014	Fawley Challenge Cup
2015	Fawley Challenge Cup

== See also ==
- Rowing on the River Thames
