= Rolandas Maščinskas =

Lithuanian rower (born 1992)

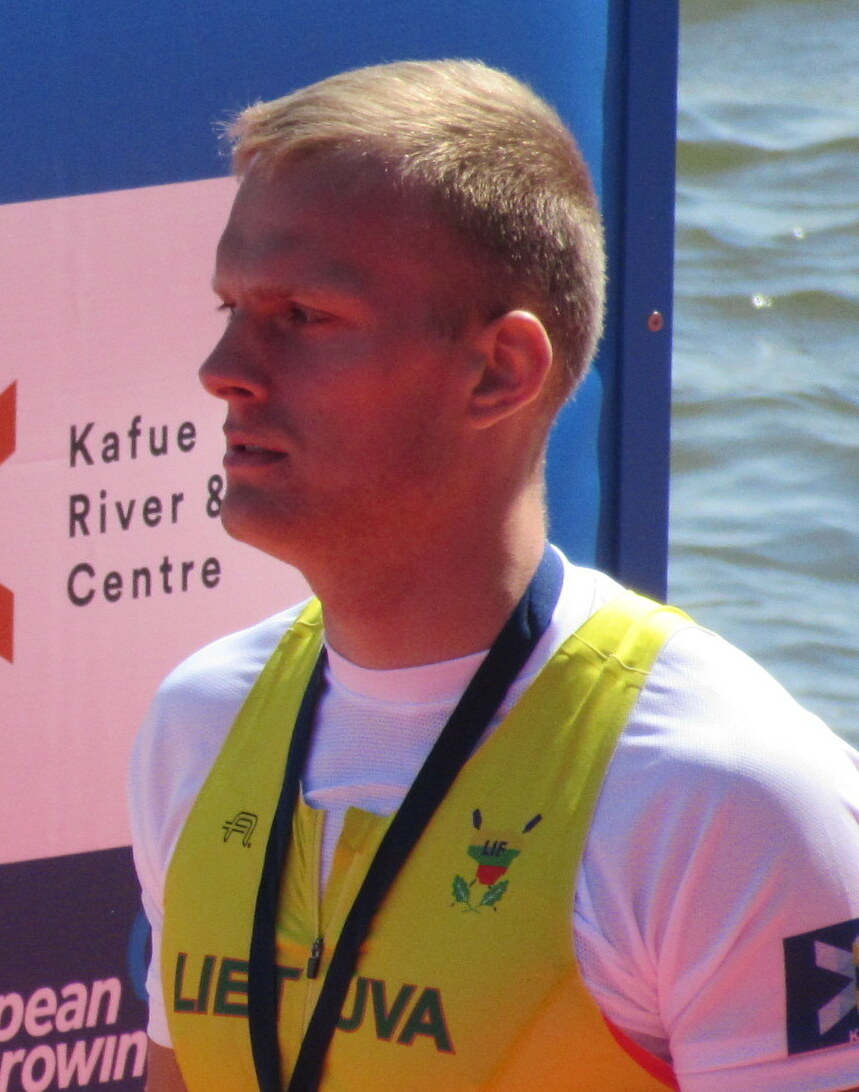
- Maščinskas in 2016

Personal information
- Nationality: Lithuanian
- Born: 6 August 1992 (age 34) Strielčiai, Lithuania

Sport
- Country: Lithuania
- Sport: Rowing
Medal record
Men's rowing
Representing Lithuania
World Championships
Gold medal – first place	2017 Sarasota	Quadruple sculls
Silver medal – second place	2013 Chungju	Double sculls
Silver medal – second place	2015 Aiguebelette	Double sculls
European Championships
Gold medal – first place	2011 Plovdiv	Double sculls
Gold medal – first place	2014 Belgrade	Double sculls
Gold medal – first place	2017 Račice	Quadruple sculls
Silver medal – second place	2013 Seville	Double sculls
Silver medal – second place	2018 Glasgow	Quadruple sculls
Bronze medal – third place	2016 Brandenburg	Double sculls

Rolandas Maščinskas (born 6 August 1992) is a Lithuanian rower. At the 2010 Summer Youth Olympics he won the gold medal in the single sculls event. Maščinskas become the first Lithuanian champion and the first medalist in the Youth Olympics.

== Biography ==
Currently living in Trakai. Studying in Mykolas Romeris University.

== Achievements ==
Year	Competition	Venue	Position	Event	Notes
2009	European Rowing Championships	Brest, Belarus	8th	Single sculls	
2009	World Rowing Junior Championships	Brive-la-Gaillarde, France	4th	Single sculls	
2010	Youth Olympics	Singapore	1st	Single sculls	3:13.82
