= Graeme Thomas =

British rower (born 1988)

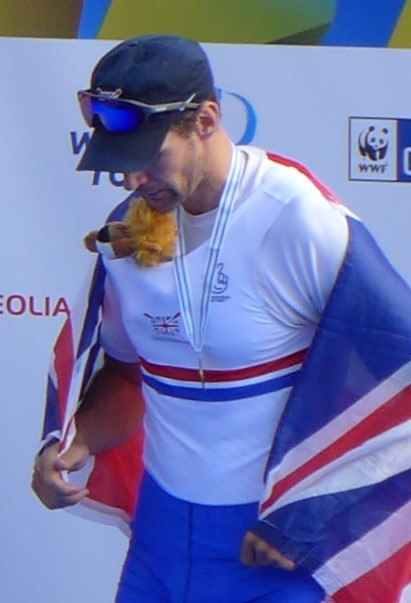
- Thomas in Račice, 2022

Personal information
- Full name: Graeme Edward Thomas
- Born: 8 November 1988 (age 38) Preston, Lancashire, England
- Height: 194 cm (6 ft 4 in)

Sport
- Club: Agecroft Rowing Club
Medal record
Men's rowing
Representing Great Britain
World Championships
Silver medal – second place	2014 Amsterdam	Quadruple sculls
Silver medal – second place	2017 Sarasota	Quadruple sculls
Bronze medal – third place	2013 Chungju	Quadruple sculls
Bronze medal – third place	2022 Račice	Single sculls
European Championships
Silver medal – second place	2014 Belgrade	Quadruple sculls
Bronze medal – third place	2015 Poznań	Quadruple sculls
Bronze medal – third place	2021 Varese	Double sculls

Graeme Edward Thomas (born 8 November 1988) is a British rower.

== Rowing career ==
Thomas competed at the 2013 World Rowing Championships in Chungju, where he won a bronze medal as part of the quad sculls with Sam Townsend, Charles Cousins and Peter Lambert. The following year he competed at the 2014 World Rowing Championships in Bosbaan, Amsterdam, where he won a silver medal as part of the quadruple sculls with Townsend, Cousins and Lambert.

He was selected for the quadruple sculls for the 2016 Olympics, but illness forced him to withdraw shortly before racing started. He won a silver medal at the 2017 World Rowing Championships in Sarasota, Florida, as part of the quadruple sculls with Jack Beaumont, Jonathan Walton and John Collins.

In 2021, he won a European bronze medal in the double sculls in Varese, Italy. Then he won the Diamond Challenge Sculls (the premier event for single sculls) at the Henley Royal Regatta.
