= Olivia Carnegie-Brown =

British rower (born 1991)

Personal information
- Nationality: British
- Born: 28 March 1991 (age 35) Westminster, London, England
- Height: 1.81 m (5.9 ft)

Sport
- Country: Great Britain
- Sport: Women's rowing
- University team: Oxford Brookes University
Medal record
Representing Great Britain
Olympic Games
Silver medal – second place	2016 Rio de Janeiro	W8+
European Championships
Bronze medal – third place	2012 Varese	W8+
Silver medal – second place	2012 Varese	W2-
Silver medal – second place	2014 Belgrade	W8+
Gold medal – first place	2016 Brandenberg	W8+

Olivia Carnegie-Brown (born 28 March 1991 in Westminster, London) is a British rower. She won a silver medal in the women's eight at the 2016 Summer Olympics.

== Education ==
She was educated at Queen Anne's School in Caversham, Berkshire and attended Oxford Brookes University. While at school at Caversham, Carnegie-Brown started her rowing career on GB Rowing Team's Start programme. For three years she trained under Eira Parry.
