= Charles Cousins =

British rower (born 1988)

Personal information
- Born: 13 December 1988 (age 37) Cambridge, England

Sport
- Club: Team Bath
Medal record
Men's Rowing
Representing Great Britain
World Championships
Silver medal – second place	2014 Amsterdam	M4x
Bronze medal – third place	2013 Chungju	M4x
European Championships
Silver medal – second place	2014 Belgrade	M4x

Charles Peter Cousins (born 13 December 1988) is a British rower who competed at the 2012 Summer Olympics.

== Rowing career ==
Cousins competed in the quadruple sculls at the 2012 Summer Olympics with Stephen Rowbotham, Tom Solesbury and Matthew Wells finishing in fifth place.

He competed in the 2013 World Rowing Championships in Chungju gaining a bronze medal in the men's quadruple sculls with Graeme Thomas, Sam Townsend and Peter Lambert. At the 2014 World Championships, he won a silver medal in the same event, again with Thomas, Townsend and Lambert. The same team won the silver medal at the 2014 European Championships.

Most recently in the 2024 world coastal beach sprints in Genoa, ITA, where he took the gold medal in the mixed quadruple skull A final with Cameron Buchan, Heather Gordon, Rosa Thomson and Ryan Glymond in the coxswain seat.

== Coaching ==
Cousins was a coach for the Abingdon School Boat Club.
