= Hollandia Roeiclub =

Dutch rowing club

- Location: Evert Cornelislaan 15, 3533 SP Utrecht Netherlands
- Coordinates: 52.085101°N 5.081345°E
- Founded: 1954

Hollandia Roeiclub (HRC) is a Dutch rowing club based in Utrecht open to current members and former members of the Dutch national rowing team.

== History ==
The primary aim of HRC is to support top rowers and talents in their ambitions for international success with resources, knowledge and experience, regardless of the individual association interests. In addition, HRC tries to contribute to the social development of top athletes through its network of former internationals and to fulfill a role as an alumni platform that helps former top rowers in their career after sport.

The club appears in the 2010 movie The Social Network (which was based on real events) beating the Harvard team of the Winklevoss twins in the finals of The Grand Challenge Cup during the Henley Royal Regatta in 2004, which they won representing the Holland Acht (Holland 8), the official Dutch rowing team. As a result of their win (the first Dutch men's eight victory at Henley, which they repeated in 2006), they qualified for the 2004 Summer Olympics in which they won the silver medal.

In 2019, the Hollandia Acht (Netherlands U23) rowed a Ladies' Challenge Plate record in Henley during the semi-finals against Leander Club.

== Honours ==
=== Henley Royal Regatta ===
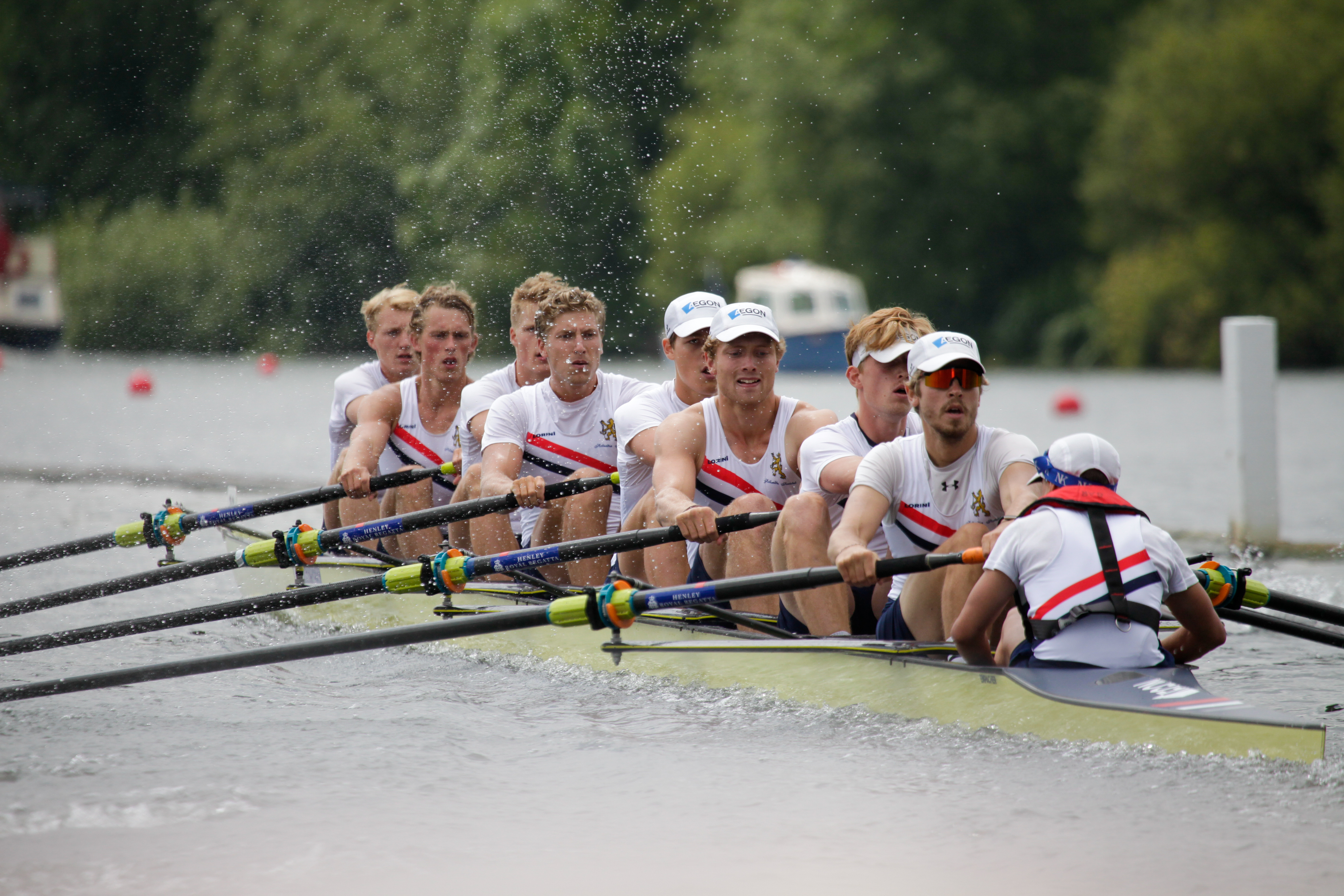
Hollandia Roeiclub at the 2019 Henley Royal Regatta (Ladies' Challenge Plate)

Year	Races won
2004	Grand Challenge Cup
2006	Grand Challenge Cup, Stewards' Challenge Cup
2016	Grand Challenge Cup, Stewards' Challenge Cup, Princess Royal Challenge Cup
2017	Town Challenge Cup, Princess Grace Challenge Cup
2019	Town Challenge Cup
