= Leander Club =

British rowing club

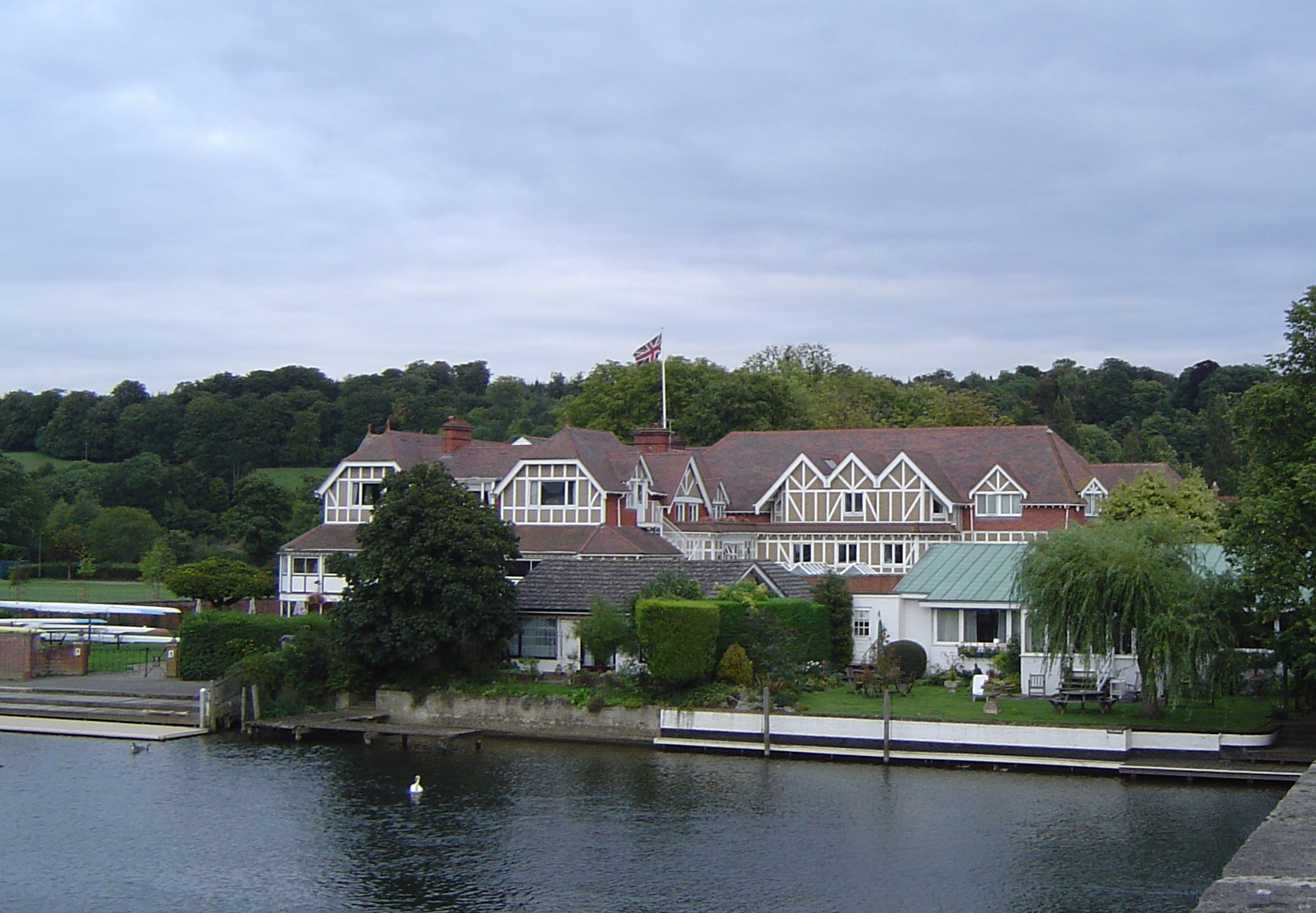

- Motto: Corpus Leandri spes mea
- Location: Remenham, Berkshire, England
- Coordinates: 51°32′17″N 0°53′57″W
- Home water: Henley Reach, River Thames
- Founded: 1818; 208 years ago
- Affiliations: British Rowing boat code - LDR
- Website: www.leander.co.uk

Notable members
- See below

Leander Club, founded in 1818, is one of the oldest rowing clubs in the world, and the oldest non-academic club. It is based in Remenham in Berkshire, England and adjoins Henley-on-Thames. Only three clubs older than Leander survive: Westminster School Boat Club, founded in 1813, and Brasenose College Boat Club and Jesus College Boat Club, which competed in a head race in 1815.

== History ==
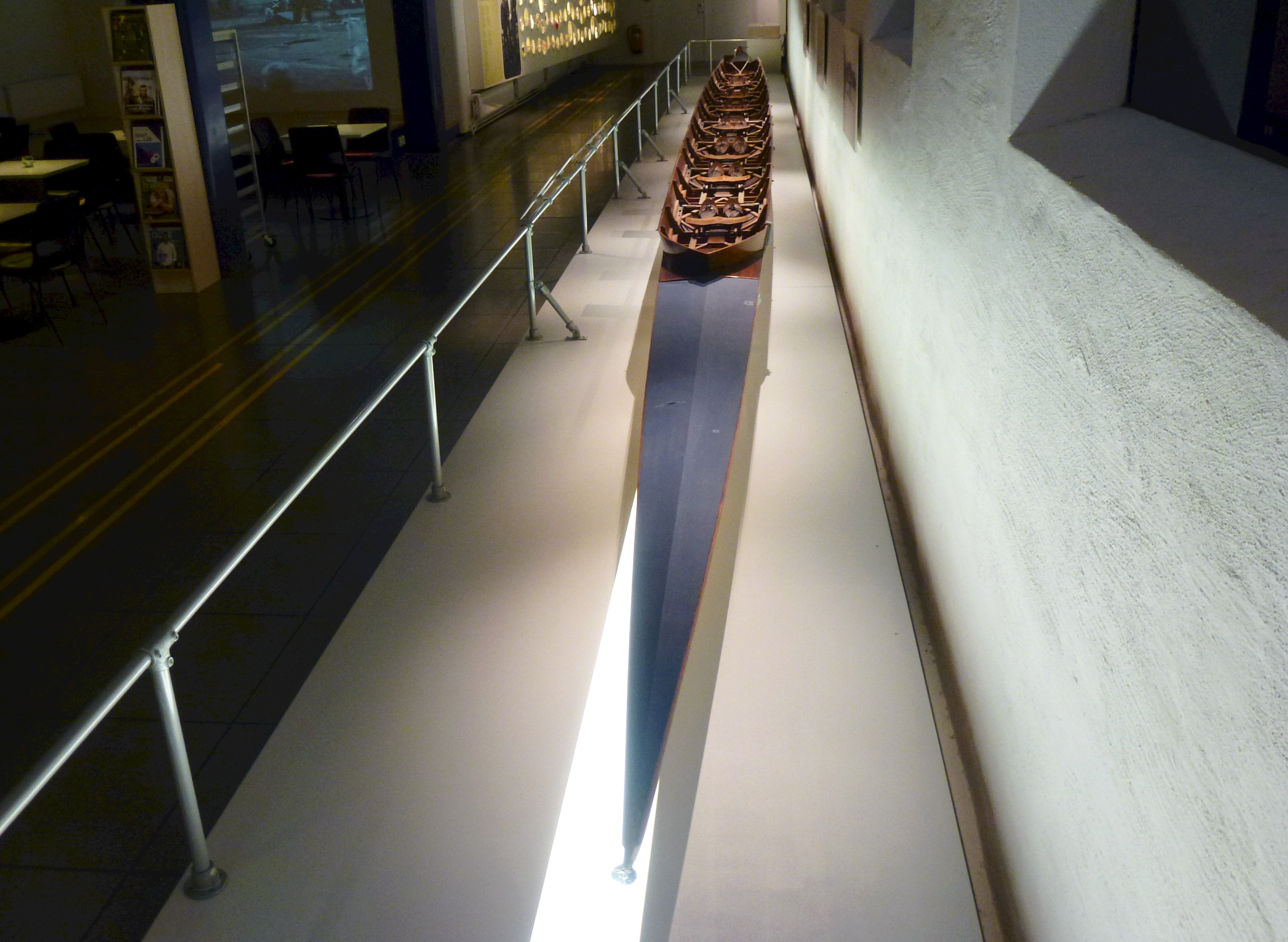
The winning Leander boat from the 1912 Summer Olympics

Leander was founded on the Tideway in 1818 or 1819 by members of the old "Star" and "Arrow" Clubs and membership was at first limited to sixteen. "The Star" and "the Arrow" clubs died out sometime in the 1820s and Leander itself was in full swing by 1825. By 1830 it was looked upon as a well-known and established boat club.

In its early days, Leander was as much a social association as a competitive club and it was steered by a waterman. It was the first club to support young watermen and instituted a coat and badge for scullers.

In 1831, Leander defeated Oxford University in a race rowed from Hambleden Lock to Henley Bridge, but when it lost the match with Cambridge six years later, Lord Esher noted at a dinner that Leander was:

A London Club consisting of men who had never been at the University but ... were recognised throughout England, and perhaps everywhere in the world, as the finest rowers who had up to that time been seen.

However, Lord Esher also noted that they were "verging on being middle-aged men." Until 1856, the number of members was limited to twenty-five men. After this date membership was increased to thirty-five and the limit finally abolished in 1862. In 1858 Leander began to recruit members from both Oxford University and Cambridge University.

Its first home is assumed to have been Searle's yard, Stangate, on land currently occupied by St Thomas's Hospital on the south bank of the River Thames. In 1860 the membership moved the club to Putney where a small piece of land was rented on which a tent was erected for housing boats. This land was bought by London Rowing Club in 1864 and is the site of LRC's clubhouse. Leander was able to lease a piece of land adjoining, and in 1866 started to construct a boathouse. Thirty years later, in 1897, the club purchased land in Henley-on-Thames and built its current clubhouse. The club's centre of gravity moved rapidly to Henley, although the Putney boathouse was retained until 1961.

Leander entered a crew at Henley Royal Regatta for the first time in 1840, the year following the regatta's foundation. Their crew which won the Grand Challenge Cup included Thomas Lowther Jenkins in the 5 seat. Jenkins' winner's medal was discovered in a Belfast junk shop more than 130 years later by a member who donated it to the club, where it sits in one of the trophy cabinets.

For the first 179 years of its existence, Leander was a male-only club but has accepted women members since 1998. On 1 January 2013 Debbie Flood was elected as the club's first female captain, and was re-elected the following year.

Leander was one of five clubs which retained the right until 2012 to appoint representatives to the Council of British Rowing. The others were London Rowing Club, Thames Rowing Club, Oxford University Boat Club and Cambridge University Boat Club.

Leander members contributed 23 of the 45 British rowers selected for the 2020 Summer Olympics.

== Notable members ==
Notable members include:

- Jack Beaumont
- Karen Bennett
- Robin Bourne-Taylor
- Chloe Brew
- Sholto Carnegie
- John Collins
- Ed Coode
- James Cracknell
- Jacob Dawson
- Katherine Douglas
- Rebecca Edwards
- Charles Elwes
- Henry Fieldman
- Debbie Flood
- Emily Ford
- Thomas Ford
- Tim Foster
- Fiona Gammond
- Thomas George
- Harcourt Gilbey Gold
- Jürgen Gröbler
- Angus Groom
- Mark Hunter
- Frederick Septimus Kelly
- Hugh Laurie
- Ran Laurie
- Harry Leask
- Stuart Mackenzie
- Alexander McCulloch
- Rowan McKellar
- Gully Nickalls
- Guy Nickalls
- Alex Partridge
- Matthew Pinsent
- Steve Redgrave
- Pete Reed
- Rebecca Romero
- Matthew Rossiter
- Will Satch
- Hannah Scott
- Colin Smith
- Tom Stallard
- Polly Swann
- Victoria Thornley
- Anna Watkins
- Josh West
- Steve Williams
- Oliver Wynne-Griffith

== In fiction ==
In Evelyn Waugh's novel Brideshead Revisited, the character Cousin Jasper (who "had come within appreciable distance of getting his rowing blue") wears a Leander Club tie when he first calls upon the protagonist Charles Ryder to offer advice on being a student at Oxford. In the 1981 television adaptation, Cousin Jasper (played by Stephen Moore) is depicted wearing the Leander's "city" tie (dark blue with small pink hippopotamus motifs). In the novel Growing Up by Angela Thirkell, the Rev. Tommy Needham "thought how well his college and Leander oars, never to be used again, would look upon the wall...." The Leander Club figures heavily in Deborah Crombie's detective novel, No Mark Upon Her.

== Honours ==
=== British champions since 2013 ===
Year	Winning crew/s
2013	Victor Ludorum, Open 2x, Open4x, Open 4-, Open 8+, Women 2x, Women 4-, Women 8+
2014	Victor Ludorum, Open 2x, Open 8+, Women 8+
2015	Victor Ludorum, Open 2x, Open 4-, Open 4x, Women 4x, Women 4-
2016	Victor Ludorum, Open 2x, Open 4x, Open 8+, Women 4x, Women 8+
2018	Open 4x, Women 4x, Women 8+

Key

- J (junior), 2, 4, 8 (crew size), 18, 16, 15, 14 (age group), x (sculls), - (coxless), + (coxed)

=== Henley Royal Regatta ===
Year	Races won
1840	Grand Challenge Cup
1845	Diamond Challenge Sculls
1849	Stewards' Challenge Cup
1875	Grand Challenge Cup
1880	Grand Challenge Cup
1891	Grand Challenge Cup, Silver Goblets
1892	Grand Challenge Cup
1893	Grand Challenge Cup
1894	Grand Challenge Cup
1895	Diamond Challenge Sculls
1896	Grand Challenge Cup, Diamond Challenge Sculls
1897	Stewards' Challenge Cup, Silver Goblets & Nickalls' Challenge Cup
1898	Grand Challenge Cup, Stewards' Challenge Cup
1899	Grand Challenge Cup, Silver Goblets & Nickalls' Challenge Cup
1900	Grand Challenge Cup, Stewards' Challenge Cup
1901	Grand Challenge Cup
1903	Grand Challenge Cup, Diamond Challenge Sculls
1904	Grand Challenge Cup
1905	Grand Challenge Cup, Stewards' Challenge Cup, Diamond Challenge Sculls
1906	Stewards' Challenge Cup
1907	Silver Goblets & Nickalls' Challenge Cup
1908	Diamond Challenge Sculls
1909	Silver Goblets & Nickalls' Challenge Cup
1910	Silver Goblets & Nickalls' Challenge Cup
1913	Grand Challenge Cup
1914	Stewards' Challenge Cup
1922	Grand Challenge Cup
1924	Grand Challenge Cup
1925	Grand Challenge Cup
1926	Grand Challenge Cup
1929	Grand Challenge Cup
1932	Grand Challenge Cup
1934	Grand Challenge Cup
1937	Stewards' Challenge Cup
1938	Stewards' Challenge Cup, Silver Goblets & Nickalls' Challenge Cup
1946	Grand Challenge Cup, Silver Goblets & Nickalls' Challenge Cup
1948	Silver Goblets & Nickalls' Challenge Cup
1949	Grand Challenge Cup
1950	Diamond Challenge Sculls
1951	Double Sculls Challenge Cup
1952	Grand Challenge Cup
1953	Grand Challenge Cup, Stewards' Challenge Cup
1957	Silver Goblets & Nickalls' Challenge Cup
1958	Silver Goblets & Nickalls' Challenge Cup
1959	Double Sculls Challenge Cup
1960	Diamond Challenge Sculls
1962	Double Sculls Challenge Cup, Diamond Challenge Sculls
1963	Silver Goblets & Nickalls' Challenge Cup
1964	Silver Goblets & Nickalls' Challenge Cup, Double Sculls Challenge Cup
1965	Prince Philip Challenge Cup
1968	Thames Challenge Cup
1969	Thames Challenge Cup
1970	Thames Challenge Cup
1972	Double Sculls Challenge Cup, Wyfold Challenge Cup
1973	Double Sculls Challenge Cup+
1975	Grand Challenge Cup+, Double Sculls Challenge Cup, Britannia Challenge Cup
1977	Double Sculls Challenge Cup, Diamond Challenge Sculls
1978	Double Sculls Challenge Cup, Diamond Challenge Sculls
1979	Silver Goblets & Nickalls' Challenge Cup, Double Sculls Challenge Cup+, Thames Challenge Cup
1980	Britannia Challenge Cup
1981	Diamond Challenge Sculls
1982	Grand Challenge Cup+, Diamond Challenge Sculls
1983	Double Sculls Challenge Cup+
1984	Grand Challenge Cup+, Diamond Challenge Sculls
1985	Ladies' Challenge Plate
1986	Silver Goblets & Nickalls' Challenge Cup
1987	Silver Goblets & Nickalls' Challenge Cup
1988	Grand Challenge Cup+, Stewards' Challenge Cup
1989	Silver Goblets & Nickalls' Challenge Cup, Wyfold Challenge Cup, Britannia Challenge Cup
1990	Stewards' Challenge Cup+
1991	Grand Challenge Cup+, Stewards' Challenge Cup+, Silver Goblets & Nickalls' Challenge Cup, Queen Mother Challenge Cup+, Ladies' Challenge Plate+, Prince Philip Challenge Cup+
1992	Diamond Challenge Sculls, Prince Philip Challenge Cup
1993	Stewards' Challenge Cup+, Silver Goblets & Nickalls' Challenge Cup, Prince Philip Challenge Cup+
1994	Silver Goblets & Nickalls' Challenge Cup
1995	Silver Goblets & Nickalls' Challenge Cup, Prince Philip Challenge Cup
1997	Stewards' Challenge Cup+, Silver Goblets & Nickalls' Challenge Cup, Prince Philip Challenge Cup+
1998	Stewards' Challenge Cup
1999	Stewards' Challenge Cup+, Fawley Challenge Cup
2000	Stewards' Challenge Cup, Silver Goblets & Nickalls' Challenge Cup, Fawley Challenge Cup, Prince Philip Challenge Cup+
2001	Stewards' Challenge Cup+, Silver Goblets & Nickalls' Challenge Cup, Queen Mother Challenge Cup, Prince Philip Challenge Cup+
2002	Silver Goblets & Nickalls' Challenge Cup, Queen Mother Challenge Cup+, Thames Challenge Cup, Fawley Challenge Cup
2003	Silver Goblets & Nickalls' Challenge Cup, Prince Philip Challenge Cup
2004	Stewards' Challenge Cup+, Ladies' Challenge Plate, Princess Grace Challenge Cup,
2005	Stewards' Challenge Cup+, Double Sculls Challenge Cup+ Britannia Challenge Cup
2006	Double Sculls Challenge Cup+, Visitors' Challenge Cup+
2007	Stewards' Challenge Cup+, Visitors' Challenge Cup, Thames Challenge Cup
2008	Diamond Challenge Sculls, Ladies' Challenge Plate, Thames Challenge Cup, Remenham Challenge Cup
2009	Grand Challenge Cup+, Stewards' Challenge Cup+, Remenham Challenge Cup, Princess Grace Challenge Cup
2010	Queen Mother Challenge Cup, Visitors' Challenge Cup+, Prince of Wales Challenge Cup, Princess Grace Challenge Cup
2011	Stewards' Challenge Cup+, Double Sculls Challenge Cup, Queen Mother Challenge Cup+, Silver Goblets & Nickalls' Challenge Cup+, Visitors' Challenge Cup+, Prince of Wales Challenge Cup
2012	Double Sculls Challenge Cup, Prince of Wales Challenge Cup
2013	Grand Challenge Cup+, Queen Mother Challenge Cup+, Ladies' Challenge Plate+, Prince of Wales Challenge Cup, Remenham Challenge Cup, Princess Grace Challenge Cup
2014	Grand Challenge Cup+, Stewards' Challenge Cup+, Queen Mother Challenge Cup+, Prince of Wales Challenge Cup, Remenham Challenge Cup, Princess Grace Challenge Cup
2015	Grand Challenge Cup+, Stewards' Challenge Cup+, Double Sculls Challenge Cup, Queen Mother Challenge Cup+, Silver Goblets & Nickalls' Challenge Cup+, Prince of Wales Challenge Cup
2016	Double Sculls Challenge Cup, Queen Mother Challenge Cup, Ladies' Challenge Plate, Princess Grace Challenge Cup+
2017	Stewards' Challenge Cup+, Queen Mother Challenge Cup, Visitors' Challenge Cup, Prince of Wales Challenge Cup
2018	Stewards' Challenge Cup, Double Sculls Challenge Cup, Queen Mother Challenge Cup+, Visitors' Challenge Cup, Town Challenge Cup+
2019	Stewards' Challenge Cup+, Double Sculls Challenge Cup+, Queen Mother Challenge Cup, Visitors' Challenge Cup+, Fawley Challenge Cup
2021	Queen Mother Challenge Cup, Prince of Wales Challenge Cup, Remenham Challenge Cup, Wargrave Challenge Cup, Town Challenge Cup, Hambleden Pairs Challenge Cup, Princess Grace Challenge Cup, Princess Royal Challenge Cup
2022	Grand Challenge Cup, Ladies' Challenge Plate, Remenham Challenge Cup, Prince of Wales Challenge Cup
2023	Fawley Challenge Cup, Town Challenge Cup, Prince of Wales Challenge Cup, Princess Grace Challenge Cup
2024	Queen Mother Challenge Cup, Prince of Wales Challenge Cup, Visitors' Challenge Cup
2025	Ladies' Challenge Plate, Visitors' Challenge Cup, Queen Mother Challenge Cup

+ composite

== See also ==
- Henley Royal Regatta
- London Rowing Club
- Thames Rowing Club
- Rowing on the River Thames
