= Zoe Lee =

British rower (born 1985)

Personal information
- Full name: Zoe Samantha Lee
- Born: 15 December 1985 (age 40) Richmond, North Yorkshire, United Kingdom
- Education: Hertford College, Oxford; King's College London
Medal record
Women's rowing
Representing Great Britain
Olympic Games
Silver medal – second place	2016 Rio de Janeiro	Eight
European Championships
Gold medal – first place	2016 Brandenburg	Eight
Silver medal – second place	2014 Belgrade	Eight
Silver medal – second place	2019 Lucerne	Eight
Bronze medal – third place	2012 Varese	Eight

Zoe Samantha Lee (born 15 December 1985) is a British rower. She won a silver medal in the women's eight at the 2016 Olympic Games in Rio de Janeiro and a gold medal at the 2016 European Rowing Championships.

She read geography at the Hertford College, Oxford and completed her PhD in geography at King's College London in 2016.
