= Karl Hudspith =

British rower

- Karl Hudspith at the Wilmer Eye Institute

Personal information
- Born: Karl Alexander Zhivojin Hudspith; 31 March 1988 (age 38) Hammersmith, London, England
- Education: Hampton School, Oxford Brookes University, University of Oxford

Sport
- Country: Great Britain
- Sport: Rowing
Medal record
Representing Great Britain
FISU World University Championships
Gold medal – first place	2010 Szeged	M8+
Gold medal – first place	2014 Aiguebelette	M8+
World Rowing U23 Championships
Bronze medal – third place	2010 Brest	M8+
The Boat Race
Gold medal – first place	The Boat Race 2011	Oxford
Gold medal – first place	The Boat Race 2013	Oxford
Gold medal – first place	The Boat Race 2014	Oxford
Silver medal – second place	The Boat Race 2012	Oxford
Henley Royal Regatta
Gold medal – first place	Prince Albert 2009	Oxford Brookes

Karl Hudspith (born 31 March 1988 in Hammersmith, London), is a British rower and scientist. Hudspith competed in four Boat Races from 2011 to 2014 for Oxford, and was a member of the winners' team on three occasions. Hudspith competed for Great Britain in rowing at Junior, Under-23, Student, and Senior levels and is a two time World University Rowing Champion. He completed his PhD at the University of Oxford where he developed a next-generation sequencing based diagnostic test for inherited retinal degeneration before beginning a legal career in American intellectual property law in Washington DC.

== Rowing career ==
Hudspith learned to row at Hampton School Boat Club, where he represented Great Britain in his final year at the 2006 Junior World Championships. Hudspith would go on to represent Great Britain at the 2008, 2009, and 2010 World Rowing U23 Championships, the 2013 World Rowing Cup, and the 2010 and 2014 FISU World University Rowing Championships.

Hudspith was in the five seat of the winning Oxford Blue boat at the 2011 Oxford-Cambridge Boat Race. For the 2012 season Hudspith was elected president of the Oxford University Boat Club, and rowed in the five seat during the controversial 2012 Boat race which was disrupted by a protester. Hudspith rowed in the six seat for the 2013 boat race, which Oxford won by a length and a half. Hudspith competed in his fourth boat race in 2014 in the three seat, winning by eleven lengths, the largest winning margin in 41 years.

== Science career ==
Hudspith obtained his bachelor's degree in biology at Oxford Brookes University, before completing a PhD in Clinical Neurosciences at the University of Oxford. During Hudspith's Doctoral work he helped develop a next-generation sequencing based DNA diagnostic test for patients with inherited retinal degenerations which was introduced into the NHS in Oxfordshire. Hudspith was part of the team that discovered that mutations in the PIGQ and CBL genes are a cause of Ohtahara syndrome, a rare and fatal form of early-onset epilepsy.

Hudspith completed his post-doctoral fellowship at the Wilmer Eye Institute at Johns Hopkins University. Hudspith worked in the lab of Dr Mandeep Singh with the aim of developing a stem-cell based regenerative medicine treatment for inherited retinal degenerations. He was the 2015 and 2018 recipient of the Juliette RP Vision Foundation Young Scientist Award.

== Legal career ==
Hudspith joined the law firm of Wilson Sonsini Goodrich & Rosati as a scientific adviser in January 2019. Hudspith is part of the firm's patents and innovation practice in the life sciences

== Personal life ==
Hudspith grew up in Twickenham, England, and attended Hampton School. He currently lives in Baltimore, Maryland and is married to Lauren Hudspith.
