= Tees Rowing Club =

Rowing club in Stockton-on-Tees, England

- Emblem: Shield with three ships above a maroon riverside landscape beneath three maroon dots set amid crossed square (old "standard") oars.
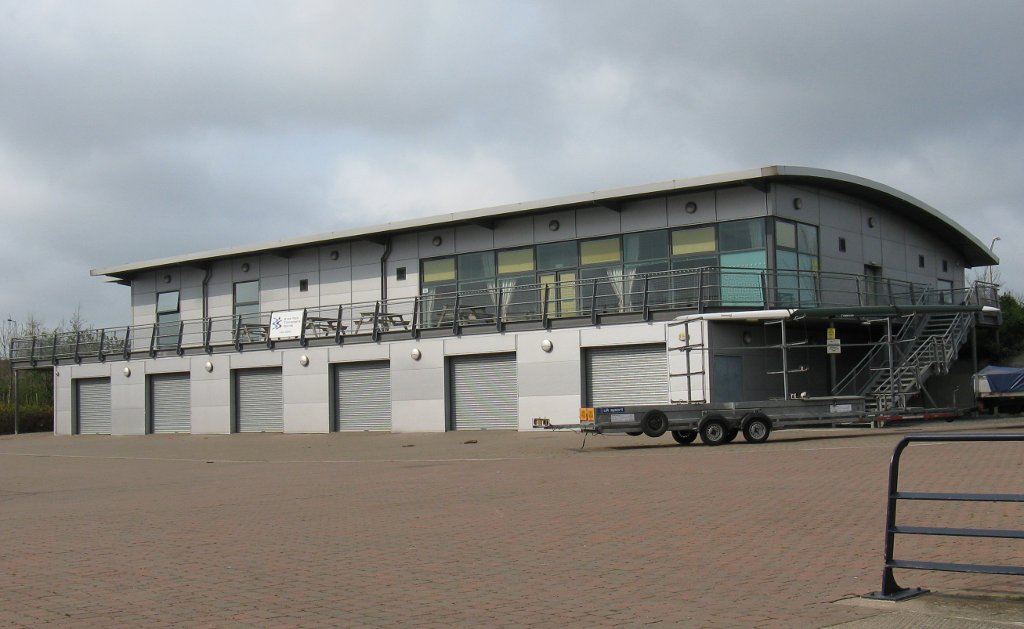

- Location: River Tees Watersports Centre in Stockton-on-Tees, North East England
- Coordinates: 54.566°N 1.304°W
- Home water: River Tees
- Founded: 1864
- University: Close links to University of Teesside Rowing Club (UT): shared site.
- Colours: Maroon and light or (for blades) vivid sky blue
- Affiliations: British Rowing boat code - TEE
- Website: www.teesrowingclub.co.uk

Events
- Tees Regatta (around late May)

Tees Rowing Club is a rowing club based on the River Tees in Northeast England. The club is currently based at the River Tees Watersports Centre in Stockton-on-Tees and is affiliated to British Rowing.

The blade colours are or were "white, with a light blue and maroon stripe"; kit: maroon with two light blue side stripes. The blade without white is a recent photography-based variant and likely post-dates 2020, due to a change of colours.

== History ==
The club was founded in 1864, with the first boathouse opened one year later.

The Roll of Honour at the club includes 2012 Olympic gold medal winner Kat Copeland and 2016 Paralympic gold medal winner Laurence Whiteley.

== Honours ==
=== British champions ===
| Year | Winning crew/s |
|---|---|
| 1981 | Men J18 1x |
| 2010 | Women J17 1x |
| 2013 | Women 4x |

=== Henley Royal Regatta ===
| Year | Races won | (for) |
|---|---|---|
| 2015 | Princess Grace Challenge Cup | W 4x |

== Notable members ==
- Kat Copeland
- Laurence Whiteley
