= Matthew Rossiter =

British international rower (born 1989)

Matt Rossiter
Personal information
- Full name: Matthew Edward T. Rossiter
- Nationality: British
- Born: 25 September 1989 (age 36) Newbury, Berkshire
- Height: 189 cm (6 ft 2 in)

Sport
- Country: Great Britain
- Sport: Rowing
- Event: Coxless four
- Club: Leander Club
Medal record
Men's rowing
Representing Great Britain
World Championships
Bronze medal – third place	2017 Sarasota	Coxless four
Bronze medal – third place	2019 Ottensheim	Coxless four
European Championships
Gold medal – first place	2019 Lucerne	Coxless four
Gold medal – first place	2021 Varese	Coxless four

Matthew Edward T. Rossiter (born 25 September 1989) is a British international rower. He is an Olympian and has won medals at World Rowing Championships.

== Profile ==
Rossiter was educated at Abingdon School and gained colours for the Abingdon School Boat Club. In 2008 he finished fifth in the Under-23 eights at the Junior World Championships. He continued his rowing as a student at Durham University.

His younger brother George Rossiter is a World Under 23 Championship medallist and World University Champion.

== Rowing ==
Rossiter won a bronze medal in the coxless four at the 2017 World Championships in Sarasota, Florida. and also competed in the 2018 World Rowing Championships.

At the 2019 European Rowing Championships Rossiter was part of the team that won the gold medal in the fours. The crew included his fellow Abingdonian Oliver Cook. The same crew then won a bronze medal at the 2019 World Rowing Championships.

In 2021, he won a second European gold medal when winning the coxless four in Varese, Italy.

In December 2022, he announced his retirement from international rowing in order to join the America's Cup sailing team. He was subsequently named as part of the INEOS Britannia crew that challenged for the 2024 America's Cup.

== See also ==
- List of Old Abingdonians
