= John Collins (rower) =

British rower (born 1989)

Personal information
- Full name: John E. Collins
- Nationality: British
- Born: 24 January 1989 (age 37) Twickenham, England
- Height: 192 cm (6 ft 4 in)
- Weight: 95 kg (209 lb)

Sport
- Country: Great Britain
- Sport: Rowing
- Events: Men's double sculls Men's quadruple sculls
- Club: Leander Club

Achievements and titles
- Olympic finals: Rio 2016; Tokyo 2020
Medal record
Men's rowing
Representing Great Britain
World Championships
Silver medal – second place	2017 Sarasota	Quadruple sculls
European Championships
Bronze medal – third place	2021 Varese	Double sculls

John E. Collins (born 24 January 1989) is a British rower. He competed at the Olympics in the Double Sculls event at both the 2016 Rio and 2020 Tokyo Olympics.

Collins won a silver medal at the 2017 World Rowing Championships in Sarasota, Florida, as part of the quadruple sculls with Jack Beaumont, Jonathan Walton, and Graeme Thomas.

In 2021, he won a European bronze medal in the double sculls in Varese, Italy.

In October 2021, Collins completed the 'Metro Marathon Challenge' running 305 miles while visiting 315 London Underground stations, then running the London Marathon within two weeks.

Collins is a member of Leander Club having joined in 2010. In December 2021, he was announced as the new Club Captain.
