= Peter Lambert (rower) =

British rower (born 1986)

Personal information
- Born: 3 December 1986 (age 39) Johannesburg, South Africa
Medal record
Men's Rowing
Representing Great Britain
World Championships
Silver medal – second place	2014 Amsterdam	Quadruple sculls
Bronze medal – third place	2013 Chungju	Quadruple sculls
European Championships
Silver medal – second place	2014 Belgrade	Quadruple sculls
Bronze medal – third place	2015 Poznan	Quadruple sculls
Bronze medal – third place	2019 Lucerne	Quadruple sculls

Peter M Lambert (born 3 December 1986) is a British rower who won two World Championships medals and three European Championship medals for Great Britain.

== Rowing career ==
In 2012, he won the Diamond Challenge Sculls (the premier event for single sculls) at the Henley Royal Regatta.

Lambert competed at the 2013 World Rowing Championships in Chungju, where he won a bronze medal as part of the quad sculls with Graeme Thomas, Sam Townsend and Charles Cousins. The following year he competed at the 2014 World Rowing Championships in Bosbaan, Amsterdam, where he won a silver medal as part of the quadruple sculls with Thomas, Townsend and Cousins.
