= Jonathan Walton =

British rower

Personal information
- Nationality: British
- Born: 6 October 1990 (age 35) Leicester, England

Sport
- Sport: Rowing
Medal record
Men's rowing
Representing Great Britain
World Championships
Silver medal – second place	2017 Sarasota	Quadruple sculls
European Championships
Bronze medal – third place	2019 Lucerne	Quadruple sculls

Jonathan Walton (born 6 October 1990) is a British rower. He competed in the men's double sculls event at the 2016 Summer Olympics alongside John Collins.

== Biography ==
Walton was born in Leicester and attended Groby Community College and Loughborough University. He started rowing at Leicester Rowing Club where he was coached by Howard Marsh. He represented Great Britain at junior and under-23 level before making his senior world championship debut in 2014. In 2016 he won his first World Cup medal, a silver at Poznan, before making his Olympic debut in Rio. Along with John Collins he finished fifth in the final. He won a silver medal at the 2017 World Rowing Championships in Sarasota, Florida, as part of the quadruple sculls with Jack Beaumont, John Collins and Graeme Thomas.
