= Reading University Boat Club =

British rowing club

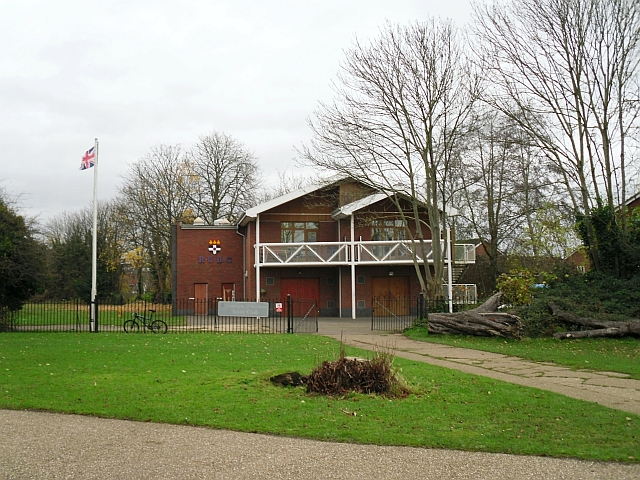

- Location: Reading, Berkshire, England
- Home water: River Thames
- Founded: 1892
- University: University of Reading
- Affiliations: British Rowing boat code - RDU; BUCS
- Website: readinguniversityboatclub.co.uk

Events
- Reading University Head of the River

Reading University Boat Club (RUBC, boat code RDU) is the rowing club for the University of Reading in the United Kingdom. It is based at a boat house in Christchurch Meadows on the River Thames in the Reading suburb of Caversham. The club has a focus on sculling.

== History ==
The club was founded in 1892, when the university was established as an extension college of Oxford University. They originally shared a boathouse with other clubs, but got their own boathouse in the 1930s. The club originally had a close association with the Clifton, Tonbridge and Cheltenham Schools.

The Reading Head of the River Race, originally organised by Reading Rowing Club but now organised by RUBC, has been held since 1935 (with a break for the second world war), attracting well over 100 crews in 2000. In 1954, the club purchased the Dreadnought public house that has closed in 1952, and subsequently built a river studies laboratory in the garden behind the pub. The ground floor was converted into the clubhouse and used by the Reading University Sailing Club until 1996.

The club topped the medal table at the BUCS regatta in 2011 and at the BUCS small boats head in 2014 and 2015, as well as wins at Henley Royal Regatta in 1986, 2008, 2009, 2010, 2011 and 2013. A number of former members have competed at the Olympics, including double gold-medallists James Cracknell and Helen Glover.

The boathouse burnt down in 1989, destroying a number of boats worth around £150,000. The current boathouse was built in 1992. The Ortner Boat Club is a club for alumni of RUBC, founded in 1997 and named after former Reading University coach Frank Ortner.

=== Notable alumni ===
- Cath Bishop won silver at the Athens 2004 Olympic Games.
- James Cracknell won gold at the Sydney 2000 and Athens 2004 Olympic Games.
- Adrian Ellison won gold at the Los Angeles 1984 Olympic Games.
- Debbie Flood won silver at the Athens 2004 and Beijing 2008 Olympic Games.
- Helen Glover won gold at the London 2012 and Rio 2016 Olympic Games.
- Alex Gregory rowed at the London 2012 and Rio 2016 Olympic Games.
- Garry Herbert won gold at the Barcelona 1992 Olympic Games.
- Stewart Innes rowed at the Rio 2016 Olympic Games.
- Sam Townsend rowed at the London 2012 and Rio 2016 Olympic Games.
- Joshua Lyon won the Wingfield Sculls in 2023 in commanding fashion and went on to represent Great Britain in the mens quad at the Under 23 European Championships

== Honours ==
=== Henley Royal Regatta ===
RUBC have been frequent competitors at the Henley Royal Regatta, which is held around 10 km downriver from Reading.

- The Princess of Wales Challenge Trophy- winners 2026
- The Queen Victoria Challenge Cup- winner 2026
- Queen Mother Challenge Cup - winner 2010 (with Leander Club), 2011 (with Leander Club), 2013 (with Leander Club)
- The Stewards' Challenge Cup - 2009 (with Leander Club); Coxless Fours - winner 1986
- The Princess Grace Challenge Cup - winner 2008 (with Wallingford Rowing Club)
- Visitors Challenge Cup - finals 1984; semi-finals 1974, 1977, 1994, 1996
- Prince of Wales Challenge Cup - semi-finals 2010, finals 2022
- Thames Challenge Cup - semi-finals 1948
- Ladies Plate - semi-finals 1970, 1979
- Wyfolds Challenge Cup - semi-finals 1987

=== British Championships ===
- 1987, Ltw Men 4-
- 2007, Open 4-, Women 1x
- 2009, Open 2x, Open Ltw 2x, Open U23 1x
- 2010, Open U23 1x
- 2011 Women 8+
- 2014, Open 4x
- 2015, Women 2x
- 2024, Open 2x

=== University Sport ===
- BUCS Small Boats Head - Top of Medal Table 2014, 2015
- BUCS Regatta - Top of medal table, 2011
- BUSA Regatta - Second in Victor Ludorum, 2006
- BUCS Regatta - Won both Championship Quads and Doubles, 2023
- BUCS Regatta - Won the Championship Quads, Doubles and Single, 2024

== Reading Head of the River Rac e ==
The Reading University Head of the River race has been run since 1935 and is the largest student-organised public sporting event in the country, drawing a record 237 crews in 2015. It is run over a 4.6 km course on the Thames between Mapledurham lock and Caversham lock. Major prizes are the Roe Challenge Cup for the fastest crew overall, the Coronation Cup for the fastest Senior III crew, the Bourne Cup for the fastest school, and the Mackintosh Trophy for the fastest British University crew.
