= Jack Beaumont (rower) =

British rower (born 1993)

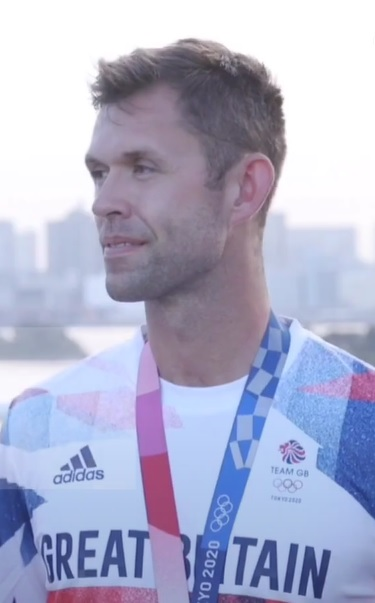
- Beaumont at the 2020 Summer Olympics

Personal information
- Born: 21 November 1993 (age 32) Maidenhead, England

Sport
- Sport: Rowing
- Club: Maidenhead Rowing Club
Medal record
Men's rowing
Representing Great Britain
Olympic Games
Silver medal – second place	2020 Tokyo	Quadruple sculls
World Championships
Silver medal – second place	2017 Sarasota	Quadruple sculls
European Championships
Bronze medal – third place	2015 Poznań	Quadruple sculls
Bronze medal – third place	2018 Glasgow	Double sculls
Bronze medal – third place	2019 Lucerne	Quadruple sculls

Jack Beaumont (born 21 November 1993) is a retired British rower. He is the silver medallist at the 2020 Summer Olympics in Men's quadruple sculls. He also won a silver medal at the World Championships.

== Career ==
Jack is the son of Olympic rower Peter Beaumont.

Beaumont started competing as part of the GB Rowing Team at the 2010 World Junior Championships in Racice, where they finished fourth. In 2014, Beaumont was a World U23 bronze medallist in men's double scull.

Beaumont was involved in an accident in 2015, which fractured several vertebrae. He missed being selected for the 2016 Summer Olympics, but days before the Games started, he was chosen to replace Graeme Thomas who had fallen ill. He competed in the men's quadruple sculls event, and finished in fifth place.

In 2017, he won a silver medal at the World Rowing Championships in Sarasota, Florida, as part of the quadruple sculls with Jonathan Walton, John Collins and Graeme Thomas.

At the 2020 Summer Olympics held in 2021 in Tokyo, Beaumont won a silver together with Harry Leask, Tom Barras and Angus Groom in the Men's quadruple sculls. Beaumont retired from international rowing after the Olympic Games.
