= Rowing at the 2015 Summer Universiade =

Rowing regatta

Rowing at the XXVIII Summer Universiade
- Venue: Tangeum Lake International Reggeta Course
- Dates: July 5, 2015 – July 7, 2015

Rowing was contested at the 2015 Summer Universiade from July 6 to 8 at the Tangeum Lake International Reggeta Course in Chungju, South Korea.

== Medal summary ==
=== Medal table ===
Rank	Nation	Gold	Silver	Bronze	Total
1	Lithuania	4	1	0	5
2	Japan	2	0	1	3
3	Ukraine	1	4	0	5
4	Italy	1	2	3	6
5	Germany	1	2	2	5
6	Poland	1	2	0	3
7	Hungary	1	0	1	2
8	China	1	0	0	1
8	United States	1	0	0	1
10	Netherlands	0	1	5	6
11	New Zealand	0	1	0	1
12	Belarus	0	0	1	1
Totals (12 entries)		13	13	13	39

=== Men's events ===
Event	Gold	Silver	Bronze
Single sculls	Žygimantas Gališanskis; Lithuania	Simone Martini; Italy	Koen Metsemakers; Netherlands
Lightweight single sculls	Jerzy Kowalski; Poland	Toby Cunliffe-Steel; New Zealand	Bence Tamás; Hungary
Double sculls	Lithuania (LTU); Rolandas Maščinskas; Saulius Ritter	Poland (POL); Dawid Grabowski; Adam Wicenciak	Germany (GER); Timo Piontek; Tim Grohmann
Lightweight double sculls	Italy (ITA); Simone Molteni; Matteo Mulas	Ukraine (UKR); Stanislav Kovalov; Ihor Khmara	Japan (JPN); Yoshihiro Otsuka; Atsushi Nagata
Coxless pair	Hungary (HUN); Adrian Attila Juhasz; Bela Simon	Italy (ITA); Simone Ferrarese; Federico Ustolin	Netherlands (NED); Jort Timmer; Djimmer Smits
Coxless four	Germany (GER); Jakob Schneider; Tobias Oppermann; Arne Schwiethal; Clemens Ernsting	Netherlands (NED); David Fox; Petrus Adrianus Grunder; Jasper Tissen; Vincent Klaassens	Italy (ITA); Guglielmo Carcano; Pietro Zileri Dal Verme; Luca Lovisolo; Matteo Borsini
Lightweight coxless four	Japan (JPN); Shota Araki; Tsuguto Hayashi; Takumi Shiga; Kakeru Sato	Germany (GER); Tobias Franzmann; Stefan Wallat; Torben Neumann; Can Temel	Italy (ITA); Michele G. Quaranta; Federico Parma; Francesco Schisano; Vincenzo Serpico
Eight	United States (USA); Matthew Herbers; Mitchell Tyson; Peter Mchugh; Wesley Vear; Kevin O'connor; Ryan Searcy; Austin Gentry; Alexander Brown; Hadzo Habibovic	Ukraine (UKR); Ihor Khmara; Andrii Mykhailov; Anton Bondarenko; Yurii Ivanov; Artem Verestiuk; Oleksandr Nadtoka; Dmytro Mikhay; Ivan Dovhodko; Vladyslav Nikulin	Netherlands (NED); Florian Kostelijk; Sjoerd Dijkstra; Sander Josephus De Graaf; Wouter Borghs; Wouter Franciscus Withagen; Henricus Groesen Van; Dirk Adriaanse; Reinier Spillenaar Bilgen; Marcus Hummelink

=== Women's events ===
Event	Gold	Silver	Bronze
Single sculls	Lina Saltyte; Lithuania	Nataliya Dovhodko; Ukraine	Marloes Oldenburg; Netherlands
Lightweight single sculls	Wang Miao; China	Sonata Petrikaitė; Lithuania	Carolin Franzke; Germany
Double sculls	Lithuania (LTU); Donata Vištartaitė; Milda Valčiukaitė	Ukraine (UKR); Ievgeniia Nimchenko; Daryna Verkhohliad	Belarus (BLR); Tatsiana Klimovich; Krystsina Staraselets
Lightweight double sculls	Japan (JPN); Ayami Oishi; Chiaki Tomita	Poland (POL); Monika Kowalska; Martyna Mikołajczak	Italy (ITA); Eleonora Trivella; Valentina Rodini
Coxless four	Ukraine (UKR); Nataliia Kovalova; Nataliya Dovhodko; Ievgeniia Nimchenko; Daryna Verkhohliad	Germany (GER); Anna-Maria Götz; Ulrike Törpsch; Johanna Te Neues; Lea-Kathleen Kühne	Netherlands (NED); Annemarie Bernhard; Marleen Verburgh; Rosa Bas; Kyra de Vries
