= 2016 World Rowing Championships – Men's lightweight coxless pair =

Men's lightweight coxless pair at the 2016 World Rowing Championships
- Venue: Willem-Alexander Baan
- Location: Rotterdam, Netherlands
- Dates: 22–27 August
- Competitors: 32 from 16 nations
- Winning time: 7:14.18

Medalists
gold medal	Augustin Mouterde; Alexis Guérinot	France
silver medal	Emil Espensen; Jens Vilhelmsen	Denmark
bronze medal	Joel Cassells; Sam Scrimgeour	Great Britain

The men's lightweight coxless pair competition at the 2016 World Rowing Championships in Rotterdam took place at the Willem-Alexander Baan.

== Schedule ==
The schedule was as follows:

Date	Time	Round
Monday 22 August 2016	17:20	Heats
Tuesday 23 August 2016	11:25	Repechages
Thursday 25 August 2016	15:45	Semifinals A/B
Saturday 27 August 2016	11:05	Final C
Saturday 27 August 2016	11:25	Final B
Saturday 27 August 2016	12:55	Final A

All times are Central European Summer Time (UTC+2)

== Results ==
=== Heats ===
The two fastest boats in each heat advanced directly to the A/B semifinals. The remaining boats were sent to the repechages.

==== Heat 1 ====
Rank	Rowers	Country	Time	Notes
1	Emil Espensen; Jens Vilhelmsen	Denmark	6:39.71	SA/B
2	Xavier Vela; Willian Giaretton	Brazil	6:41.86	SA/B
3	Nuno Goncalves Coelho; Jorge Correia Carvalho	Portugal	6:43.41	R
4	Andrew Weiland; Peter Gibson	United States	6:46.27	R
5	Roland Szigeti; David Forrai	Hungary	6:52.27	R
6	Masato Kobayashi; Kazuki Nara	Japan	6:54.97	R

==== Heat 2 ====
Rank	Rowers	Country	Time	Notes
1	Joel Cassells; Sam Scrimgeour	Great Britain	6:37.05	SA/B
2	Mark O'Donovan; Shane O'Driscoll	Ireland	6:38.84	SA/B
3	Sergei Cherepkov; Aleksei Kiiashko	Russia	6:44.40	R
4	Sergio Pérez Moreno; Jesus Gonzalez	Spain	6:45.08	R
5	Li Lei; Li Zhongwei	China	6:59.44	R

==== Heat 3 ====
Rank	Rowers	Country	Time	Notes
1	Augustin Mouterde; Alexis Guérinot	France	6:40.77	SA/B
2	Julius Peschel; Sven Keßler	Germany	6:42.89	SA/B
3	Lorenzo Tedesco; Giorgio Tuccinardi	Italy	6:47.13	R
4	Jan Hájek; Michael Humpolec	Czech Republic	6:52.37	R
5	Markus Christensen; Ola Larsson	Norway	6:53.18	R

=== Repechages ===
The three fastest boats in each repechage advanced to the A/B semifinals. The remaining boats were sent to the C final.

==== Repechage 1 ====
Rank	Rowers	Country	Time	Notes
1	Sergio Pérez Moreno; Jesus Gonzalez	Spain	6:39.20	SA/B
2	Masato Kobayashi; Kazuki Nara	Japan	6:39.30	SA/B
3	Lorenzo Tedesco; Giorgio Tuccinardi	Italy	6:39.81	SA/B
4	Nuno Goncalves Coelho; Jorge Correia Carvalho	Portugal	6:40.68	FC
5	Markus Christensen; Ola Larsson	Norway	6:49.84	FC

==== Repechage 2 ====
Rank	Rowers	Country	Time	Notes
1	Li Lei; Li Zhongwei	China	6:36.85	SA/B
2	Andrew Weiland; Peter Gibson	United States	6:37.22	SA/B
3	Sergei Cherepkov; Aleksei Kiiashko	Russia	6:38.33	SA/B
4	Jan Hájek; Michael Humpolec	Czech Republic	6:46.45	FC
5	Roland Szigeti; David Forrai	Hungary	BUW; ~~6:42.86~~	FC

=== Semifinals ===
The three fastest boats in each semi advanced to the A final. The remaining boats were sent to the B final.

==== Semifinal 1 ====
Rank	Rowers	Country	Time	Notes
1	Joel Cassells; Sam Scrimgeour	Great Britain	6:29.63	FA
2	Emil Espensen; Jens Vilhelmsen	Denmark	6:30.12	FA
3	Li Lei; Li Zhongwei	China	6:32.81	FA
4	Masato Kobayashi; Kazuki Nara	Japan	6:33.38	FB
5	Julius Peschel; Sven Keßler	Germany	6:36.39	FB
6	Sergei Cherepkov; Aleksei Kiiashko	Russia	6:38.24	FB

==== Semifinal 2 ====
Rank	Rowers	Country	Time	Notes
1	Augustin Mouterde; Alexis Guérinot	France	6:30.56	FA
2	Mark O'Donovan; Shane O'Driscoll	Ireland	6:32.18	FA
3	Andrew Weiland; Peter Gibson	United States	6:33.19	FA
4	Xavier Vela; Willian Giaretton	Brazil	6:35.07	FB
5	Lorenzo Tedesco; Giorgio Tuccinardi	Italy	6:37.34	FB
6	Sergio Pérez Moreno; Jesus Gonzalez	Spain	6:40.82	FB

=== Finals ===
The A final determined the rankings for places 1 to 6. Additional rankings were determined in the other finals.

==== Final C ====
Rank	Rowers	Country	Time
1	Nuno Goncalves Coelho; Jorge Correia Carvalho	Portugal	7:29.49
2	Jan Hájek; Michael Humpolec	Czech Republic	7:33.88
3	Roland Szigeti; David Forrai	Hungary	7:36.03
4	Markus Christensen; Ola Larsson	Norway	7:44.61

==== Final B ====
Rank	Rowers	Country	Time
1	Masato Kobayashi; Kazuki Nara	Japan	7:28.22
2	Julius Peschel; Sven Keßler	Germany	7:33.77
3	Xavier Vela; Willian Giaretton	Brazil	7:34.17
4	Sergei Cherepkov; Aleksei Kiiashko	Russia	7:35.24
5	Lorenzo Tedesco; Giorgio Tuccinardi	Italy	7:38.36
6	Sergio Pérez Moreno; Jesus Gonzalez	Spain	7:49.33

==== Final A ====
Rank	Rowers	Country	Time
1st place, gold medalist(s)	Augustin Mouterde; Alexis Guérinot	France	7:14.18
2nd place, silver medalist(s)	Emil Espensen; Jens Vilhelmsen	Denmark	7:15.30
3rd place, bronze medalist(s)	Joel Cassells; Sam Scrimgeour	Great Britain	7:16.49
4	Mark O'Donovan; Shane O'Driscoll	Ireland	7:24.60
5	Li Lei; Li Zhongwei	China	7:32.48
6	Andrew Weiland; Peter Gibson	United States	7:36.91
