= Alexander Hill (rower) =

Australian rower (born 1993)

Alex Hill OAM
Personal information
- Full name: Alexander Hill
- Born: 11 March 1993 (age 33) Berri, South Australia, Australia
- Height: 6 ft 3 in (191 cm)
- Weight: 205 lb (93 kg)

Sport
- Club: Adelaide Rowing Club

Achievements and titles
- National finals: King's Cup 2012, 2014-19; M1X Aust Champion 2019; M2- Aust Champion 2021
Medal record
Men's rowing
Representing Australia
Olympic Games
Gold medal – first place	2020 Tokyo	Coxless four
Silver medal – second place	2016 Rio de Janeiro	Coxless four
World Championships
Gold medal – first place	2017 Sarasota	Coxless four
Gold medal – first place	2018 Plovdiv	Coxless four
Silver medal – second place	2015 Aiguebelette	Coxless four
Silver medal – second place	2026 Amsterdam	Coxless pair

Alexander Hill OAM (born 11 March 1993) is an Australian representative rower.He is an Australian national champion, a dual Olympian, an Olympic gold and silver medallist and was the 2017 and 2018 world champion in the coxless four. He stroked the Australian men's coxless four to a gold medal victory at the Tokyo Olympics.

== Club and state rowing ==
Hill grew up in Loxton, South Australia. He attended Loxton North Primary School and took up rowing at Prince Alfred College in Adelaide. His senior club rowing has been from the Adelaide Rowing Club.

In 2012, from 2014 to 2017 and in 2019 Hill was seated in the South Australian state representative men's eights competing for the King's Cup at the Interstate Regatta within the Australian Rowing Championships. In those crews he won five bronze and one silver medals. In 2019 and 2021 he was also selected as South Australia's single-sculling representative to contest the President's Cup at the Interstate Regatta. He won both those national titles. In 2023 he placed fourth as the Sth Australian representative in the Presidents Cup.

In 2014 in Adelaide Rowing Club colours, he contested the national coxless pair title at the Australian Rowing Championships with Angus Moore. In 2013 he contested the national coxless pair title in an Australian selection composite crew and placed second. In 2019 at the Australian Rowing Championships he won the open men's single scull title in Adelaide colours. In 2021 rowing with Angus Dawson he won an Australian championship title in the open men's coxless pair in addition to winning the Australian championship title in the coxless four with his national training centre crewmates.

In 2021 he started to coach with the Adelaide school Prince Alfred College in their senior squad whilst on break from formal national training.

== International career ==
Hill made his Australian representative debut in a junior men's coxed four selected to contest the 2011 Junior World Rowing Championships at Eton Dorney. That crew won gold. The following year he was in the Australian U23 eight competing at the 2012 World Rowing U23 Championships in Trakai Lithuania. In a crew with Spencer Turrin with whom Hill would later enjoy World Championship success, Hill and the Australian eight took the bronze medal.

In 2013 Hill was elevated to the Australian senior squad. He rowed in a coxless pair at the World Rowing Cup I in Sydney, then in a coxless pair with Angus Moore at the World Rowing Cup III. He and Moore took that pair to the World Championships in Linz where they won an U23 World Championship silver medal. A month later at the 2013 World Rowing Championships in Chungju, Korea Hill rowed in the four seat of an Australian men's eight who placed seventh. In 2014 he kept his seat in the Australian men's eight racing at two World Rowing Cups and then at the 2014 World Rowing Championships again to seventh place.

At the 2015 World Rowing Championships on Lac d'Aiguebelette, Aiguebelette in France he won the silver medal in the men's coxless four in a crew with Will Lockwood, Spencer Turrin and Josh Dunkley-Smith.

In 2016 along with Dunkley-Smith, Lockwood and Joshua Booth, Hill was selected to stroke the Australian men's coxless four to compete at the 2016 Rio Olympics. They won their heat and semi-final and took the silver medal behind Great Britain in the final.

In 2017 Hill held his seat as stroke of in Australia's coxless four with Turrin, Joshua Hicks and Jack Hargreaves. They took gold at the World Rowing Cup II in Poznan and then raced in the Australian men's senior eight at the WRC III in Lucerne to a silver medal. At the 2017 World Rowing Championships in Sarasota Florida rowing as a four, they won their heat and semi-final. They flew out of the start in the final rating at 43 strokes per minute to be clear leaders at the 500m mark. They led at every mark and held off the fast finishing Italians. Rowing Australia quoted Hill after the race : "I've had a fair few second places so it feels great to have won gold. This group of guys have made it easy for me this year as you know they'll turn up to training and give it their all, you know what you're going to expect from them. With that comes consistency and with a new coach in Ian [Wright], it has been absolutely unbelievable for us." Australia had not won a men's coxless four world championship title since the Oarsome Foursome's win in 1991.

The world champion four stayed together into 2018 and started their 2018 international campaign with a gold medal win at the World Rowing Cup II in Linz, Austria. They repeated their 2017 tactic with a blistering rating of 43 from the start and kept it up above 40 for the rest of the race. In their second competitive outing of the 2018 international season in an Australian selection eight and racing as the Georgina Hope Rinehart National Training Centre, after Rowing Australia patron, Gina Rinehart, Hill won the 2018 Grand Challenge Cup at the Henley Royal Regatta. The fourth Australian men's eight to ever do so.The following week back in the coxless four, Hill won another gold at the World Rowing Cup III in Lucerne. At the 2018 World Rowing Championships in Plovdiv, in the same combination as 2017, the Australian coxless four won their heat, their semi-final and just held off the fast-finishing Italians in the final to retain their world title. Hill again at stroke, won his second world championship gold.

In 2019 Hill was again selected in the Australian men's sweep squad for the international representative season. In trialling combinations to qualify the men's pair for the 2020 Olympics, selectors matched Hill with Josh Booth in the pair for the World Rowing Cup II in Poznan where they were victorious. At WRC III in Rotterdam and rowing with Spencer Turrin, Hill again stroked the pair to a gold medal win. Hill, Hargreaves, Nick Purnell and Jack O'Brien were selected to race Australia's coxless four at the 2019 World Rowing Championships in Linz, Austria. The four were looking for a top eight finish at the 2019 World Championships to qualify for the Tokyo Olympics. They won their heat and semi-final, thereby qualifying the boat for Tokyo 2020. Unexpectedly as race favourites, they finished last in the final for an overall world sixth place.

At the delayed Tokyo Olympics in 2021 the coxless four won their heat and progressed straight to the A final where they held a lead from the first 500m, and were being challenged by the British four who lost their steering and control in the final 500m. With Hill maintaining the rate from the stroke seat the Australians kept their composure and held off the Romanians in a tight finish, taking the gold in an Olympic best time.

Hill was selected in the broader Australian training team for the 2022 international season and the 2022 World Rowing Championships. Racing with Harley Moore in the men's pair, he took silver at the WRC III in Lucerne. At the 2022 World Rowing Championships at Racice, he raced in the Australian coxless pair with Moore. They finished fifth overall.

In 2022, Hill declared his elite level availability and in March 2023 along with Hargreaves, Turrin and Purnell was re-selected as the Australian coxless four for the 2023 international season and world championship preparation. At the World Rowing Cup II in Varese, Italy they raced as Australia's M4- entrant. They made the A final and won the silver medal behind the Great Britain four. At 2023's WRC III in Lucerne, that unchanged four again raced the M4-. They won their heat and semi but again were beaten into second place by Great Britain in the A final. That crew was selected intact as Australia's coxless four for the 2023 World Rowing Championships in Belgrade Serbia. They placed second in their heat. They placed 3rd in the A/B semi-final at which point they qualified an Australian M4- boat for the 2024 Paris Olympics. In the A final the Australian four finished fifth, giving them a fifth place world ranking from the regatta.

== Accolades ==
In the 2022 Australia Day Honours Hill was awarded the Medal of the Order of Australia.
