= Catello Amarante =

Catello Amarante may refer to:

- Catello Amarante (rower, born 1979), Italian rower
- Catello Amarante (rower, born 1990), Italian rower
