= Alex Lloyd (rower) =

Australian rower (born 1990)

Alexander Lloyd
Personal information
- Born: 17 December 1990 (age 35) Darlinghurst, New South Wales
- Education: Shore
- Years active: 2003 - 2016

Sport
- Country: Australia
- Sport: Rowing
- Club: Sydney Rowing Club
Medal record
Men's rowing
Representing Australia
World Championships
Silver medal – second place	2013 Chungjiu	M4−
Bronze medal – third place	2014 Amsterdam	M4−

Alexander Lloyd (born 17 December 1990) in Darlinghurst, Sydney, is an Australian Olympic representative rower.

== Club and state rowing ==
Lloyd grew up in Sydney, attended Boronia Park Primary school and took up rowing in his high school years at Sydney's Shore school. In 2008 he contested the Australian schoolboy eight championship title at the Australian Rowing Championships in the Shore first VIII and placed third. He studied for a BCivilEng from Deakin University.

His senior club rowing was with the Sydney Rowing Club from 2009. In 2012 he contested the Australian U23 coxless four championship title at the Australian Rowing Championships in SRC colours and placed second. He also competed in a coxless pair at those championships with Spencer Turrin and took silver. In 2014 and 2015 Turrin and Lloyd were acknowledged with Sydney Rowing Club's Most Outstanding Oarsman award.

In 2014 Lloyd was selected in the New South Wales state representative senior men's eight which won the Kings Cup in the Interstate Regatta within the Australian Rowing Championships. He was in New South Wales King's Cup crews again in 2015, 2016 and 2017 and he stroked that eight in 2016 to a second place. Lloyd won a second King's Cup in the New South Wales eight of 2017.

== International representative rowing ==
Lloyd made his national representative debut in 2012 when selected in the Australian U23 eight to compete at the World Rowing U23 Championships in Trakai. That eight won a silver medal. In 2013 he was elevated to the Australian senior squad. He raced in the men's coxless four at all three World Rowing Cups of 2013 and then at the 2013 World Rowing Championships in Chungju, South Korea Lloyd raced in the coxless four with Will Lockwood, Josh Dunkley-Smith and Spencer Turrin. The crew placed second in the final, losing to The Netherlands by a split second.

In 2014 he held his seat in the Australian coxless four at two World Rowing Cups when Lockwood was changed-out for Fergus Pragnell. In the final of the 2014 World Rowing Championships in Amsterdam, in that coxless four with Dunkley-Smith, Turrin and Pragnell, Lloyd won a bronze medal.

In preparation for the 2015 World Rowing Championships he crashed during bicycle training in Italy and broke a collarbone. Lloyd had to withdraw from the M4- crew of Lockwood, Dunkley-Smith and Turrin and was replaced by Alexander Hill. That crew went on to win the silver medal on Lac d'Aiguebelette .

In 2016 he was selected with his Sydney Rowing Club clubmate Spencer Turrin in the men's coxless pair to compete at the 2016 Summer Olympics in Rio de Janeiro. They won their heat on day one of competition, progressed through their semi-final and finished sixth in the final.
