= Spencer Turrin =

Australian rower (born 1991)

Spencer Turrin OAM
Personal information
- Nickname: Nate
- Born: Spencer Alf Turrin; 29 August 1991 (age 34) Maitland, New South Wales, Australia
- Education: St Joseph's College, Hunters Hill
- Height: 190 cm (6 ft 3 in)

Sport
- Club: Sydney Rowing Club
- Coached by: Angus Moore

Achievements and titles
- National finals: King's Cup 2013-14, 2017-22
Medal record
Men's rowing
Representing Australia
Olympic Games
Gold medal – first place	2020 Tokyo	Coxless four
World Championships
Gold medal – first place	2017 Sarasota	Coxless four
Gold medal – first place	2018 Plovdiv	Coxless four
Silver medal – second place	2013 Chungju	Coxless four
Silver medal – second place	2015 Aiguebelette	Coxless four
Silver medal – second place	2022 Račice	Coxless four
Bronze medal – third place	2014 Amsterdam	Coxless four

Spencer Alf Turrin OAM (born 29 August 1991) is an Australian representative rower. He is a national champion, twice world champion, a dual Olympian and an Olympic champion. He competed and won medals in the Australian senior men's coxless four at every World Rowing Championship from 2013 to 2018, culminating in consecutive world championship gold at Sarasota 2017 and 2018 Plovdiv. He rowed in the two seat of the Australian men's coxless four to a gold medal victory at the Tokyo Olympics.

== Education ==
The youngest of four children born to Catherine and Vittore Turrin, Spencer grew up at Dungog, New South Wales and took up rowing in his high school years at Sydney's St Joseph's College, Hunters Hill. He rowed in the St Joseph's First VIII and while at the college also raced competitively for the Sydney Rowing Club.

== Club and national career ==
His senior career has been with the Sydney Rowing Club since 2006.

In 2012 he contested the Australian U23 coxless four championship title at the Australian Rowing Championships in SRC colours and placed second. He also competed in a coxless pair at those championships with Alexander Lloyd and took silver.

In 2014 he rowed in the New South Wales state champion pair and four. That year and also in 2013 in Sydney Rowing Club colours he contested the national coxless pair title at the Australian Rowing Championships with Lloyd. They placed third in 2013 and second in 2014. In 2014 and 2015 Turrin and Lloyd were acknowledged with Sydney Rowing Club's Most Outstanding Oarsman award.

He was first selected to represent New South Wales in 2013 in the men's senior eight contesting the King's Cup at the Interstate Regatta within the Australian Rowing Championships. He rowed in ten consecutive New South Wales eights from 2013 to 2023 including the victorious crews of 2013, 2014, 2017, 2018, 2019, 2022 and 2023. In 2021 with his national training centre crewmates he won the Australian championship title in the coxless four.

== International rowing career ==
Turrin made his Australian representative debut in an U23 men's eight selected to contest the 2011 World Rowing U23 Championships in Amsterdam. That crew placed seventh. The following year he was back in the Australian U23 eight competing at the U23 World Championships in Trakai Lithuania. In a crew with Alexander Hill with whom Turrin would later enjoy World Championship success, Turrin and the Australian eight took the bronze medal.

His Australian senior representative call-up came in 2013. He was selected in a senior coxless four with two Olympians in Will Lockwood, Josh Dunkley-Smith and his Sydney Rowing Club team-mate Alexander Lloyd. They raced at the World Rowing Cup I in Sydney to silver and then a few months later at the World Rowing Cups II and III in Europe to further medal success. At the 2013 World Rowing Championships in Chungju, South Korea they won their heat and raced brilliantly in the final leading at each of the first three marks. They were run down by the Dutch crew in the final 500 losing by 0.63 seconds and claiming the silver medal.

In the 2014 Turrin stayed in the Australian coxless four with Lloyd and Dunkley-Smith and they were joined by Fergus Pragnell. They raced at three World Rowing Cups to medal success and then in the August of that year at the 2014 World Rowing Championships in Amsterdam they won the bronze medal. In 2015 Pragnell and Lloyd were replaced by Will Lockwood and Alexander Hill and the four competed at two World Rowing Cups in Europe before taking the silver medal at the 2015 World Rowing Championships on Lac d'Aiguebelette, Aiguebelette in France.

In 2016 Turrin was selected with Lloyd to contest the men's coxless pair at the 2016 Summer Olympics in Rio de Janeiro. They won their heat on day one of competition, progressed through a semi-final and finished fifth in their final.

In 2017 Turrin was back in Australia's coxless four with Hill, Joshua Hicks and Jack Hargreaves. They took gold at the World Rowing Cup II in Poznan and then raced in the Australian men's senior eight at the WRC III in Lucerne to a silver medal. At the 2017 World Rowing Championships in Sarasota Florida rowing as a four, they won their heat and semi-final. They flew out of the start in the final rating at 43 strokes per minute to be clear leaders at the 500m mark. They led at every mark and held off the fast finishing Italians. Rowing Australia quoted Turrin after the race : “It means heaps to me, I’ve been trying for a long time to try and win something so this feels really good. To get something back after last year’s disappointing result in the Men’s Pair in Rio, this feels really good". Australia had not won a men's coxless four world championship title since the Oarsome Foursome's 1991 win in the week of Turrin's birth.

The world champion four stayed together into 2018 and started their 2018 international campaign with a gold medal win at the World Rowing Cup II in Linz, Austria. They repeated their 2017 tactic with a blistering rating of 43 strokes per minute from the start and kept it up above 40 for the rest of the race. In their second outing of the 2018 international season, in an Australian selection eight and racing as the Georgina Hope Rinehart National Training Centre, in honour of Rowing Australia patron Gina Rinehart, Turrin won the 2018 Grand Challenge Cup at the Henley Royal Regatta becoming the fourth Australian men's eight to ever do so. The following week back in the coxless four, Turrin won another gold at the World Rowing Cup III in Lucerne. At the 2018 World Rowing Championships in Plovdiv, in the same combination as 2017, the Australian coxless four won their heat, their semi-final and just held off the fast-finishing Italians in the final to retain their world title. Turrin, rowing in the two seat claimed his second world championship gold medal.

In 2019 Turrin was again selected in the Australian men's sweep squad for the international representative season. In an effort to qualify the men's pair for the 2020 Olympics, selectors broke up the world champion four into other boats. At the World Rowing Cup II in Poznan Turrin was seated at five in the Australian eight which rowed to 5th place whilst Hill and Josh Booth won gold in the pair. At WRC III in Rotterdam and rowing behind Alex Hill, Turrin took gold in the Australian men's coxless pair. Turrin was then selected to race in the Australian men's eight at the 2019 World Rowing Championships in Linz, Austria. The eight were looking for a top five finish at the 2019 World Championships to qualify for the Tokyo Olympics. The eight placed second in their heat and fourth in the final and qualified for Tokyo 2020.

In Tokyo the coxless four won their heat and progressed straight to the A final where they held a lead from the first 500m, and were being challenged by the British four who lost their steering and control in the final 500m. With Turrin in the two seat the Australians kept their composure and rating and held off the Romanians in a tight finish, taking the gold in an Olympic best time.

In 2022 Turrin, Hargreaves, Purnell and Jack O'Brien were selected as the men's four in the Australian squad for the international season and the 2022 World Rowing Championships. They took gold at the World Rowing Cup II in Poznan in June, won the Stewards Challenge Cup at the Henley Royal Regatta in July and a week later finished second at the WRC III in Lucerne. At the 2022 World Rowing Championships at Racize, he rowed in the Australian coxless four to a silver medal.

With Alex Hill's renewed intention, in March 2023 selectors picked Turrin, Hargreaves, Hill and Purnell as the Australian coxless four for the 2023 international season and world championship preparation. At the Rowing World Cup II in Varese, Italy they raced as Australia's M4- entrant. They made the A final and won the silver medal behind the Great Britain four. At 2023's RWC III in Lucerne, that unchanged four again raced the M4-. They won their heat and semi but again were beaten into second place by Great Britain in the A final. That crew was selected intact as Australia's coxless four for the 2023 World Rowing Championships in Belgrade Serbia. They placed second in their heat. They placed 3rd in the A/B semi-final at which point they qualified an Australian M4- boat for the 2024 Paris Olympics. In the A final the Australian four finished fifth, giving them a fifth place world ranking from the regatta.

== Accolades ==
In 2016 Turrin was named as the Dungog Shire's Sportsperson of the Year. In the 2022 Australia Day Honours he was awarded the Medal of the Order of Australia.
