= Timothy McDonnell =

Timothy McDonnell may refer to:

- Timothy A. McDonnell (1937–2026), American prelate of the Roman Catholic Church
- Timothy McDonnell (rower) (born 1986), Australian rower
