= Timothy Webster (rowing) =

Australian rowing cox

Personal information
- Born: 22 November 1990 (age 35)

Sport
- Country: Australia
- Sport: Rowing
- Club: Melbourne Uni Boat Club
Medal record
Men's rowing
Representing Australia
World Rowing Championships
Silver medal – second place	2013 Chungju	LM8+
World Rowing U23 Championships
Bronze medal – third place	2012 Trakai	BM8+

Timothy Webster (born 22 November 1990 in East Melbourne) is an Australian former rowing coxswain. He was a national champion and won a silver medal at the 2013 World Rowing Championships.

== Club and state rowing ==
Webster's senior club rowing was from the Melbourne University Boat Club.

Unusually for an Australian representative coxswain he made no state representative appearances at the annual Interstate Regattas in either youth or senior men's eights. In his prime representative years of 2013 and 2014 he was kept out of Victorian King's Cup crews by his older brother David Webster.

== International representative rowing ==
Webster made his Australian representative debut at the 2011 World Rowing U23 Championships in Amsterdam. He coxed the Australian men's U23 eight to an overall seventh-place finish. In 2012 he was again in the stern of the Australian men's U23 eight when they rowed to a bronze medal at the World Rowing U23 Championships in Trakai.

In 2013 Webster was elevated to the Australian senior squad when he coxed the men's lightweight eight to a silver medal at the 2013 World Rowing Championships in Chungju, Korea.

The 2014 World Rowing Cup I was in Sydney early in 2014. The final featured the Australian senior eight with a number of experienced Australian rowers and coxed by Timothy's older brother David, along with a second developmental eight coxed by Tim Webster. David also coxed at Melbourne Uni Boat Club, had earned a scholarship like Tim to the Victorian Institute of Sport, and was in the Australian senior squad from 2010 to 2015. The Australian senior eight won at that WRC I in 2014 and the crew steered by Tim Webster placed fourth.

At the 2014 World Rowing Championships in Amsterdam, Webster was up front in an Australian coxed pair which placed third in the B Final for an overall ninth-place finish. It was his last Australian representative appearance.
