= Heidi Robbins =

American rower

Personal information
- Born: July 3, 1991 (age 34) Seattle, United States
Medal record
Women's rowing
Representing the United States
World Championships
Gold medal – first place	2014 Amsterdam	W8+
Gold medal – first place	2015 Aiguebelette	W8+

Heidi Robbins (born July 3, 1991) is an American rower. She was part of the team that won the gold medal in the women's eight competition at the 2014 World Rowing Championships.
