= Leone Barbaro =

Italian rower (born 1993)

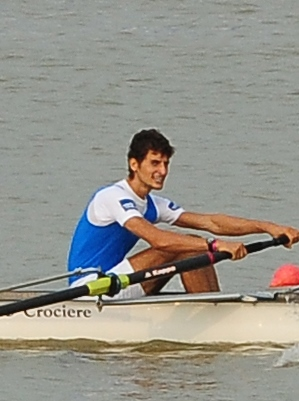

Personal information
- Born: 20 October 1993 (age 32)

Sport
- Sport: Rowing
Medal record
Men's rowing
Representing Italy
World Championships
| Gold medal – first place | 2013 Chungju | Lwt eight |
| Gold medal – first place | 2017 Sarasota | Lwt coxless four |
| Silver medal – second place | 2014 Amsterdam | Lwt eight |

Leone Barbaro (born 20 October 1993) is an Italian lightweight rower. He won a gold medal at the 2017 World Rowing Championships in Sarasota with the lightweight men's four.

== Achievements ==
| Year | Competition | Venue | Rank | Event | Time | Teammates |
|---|---|---|---|---|---|---|
| 2013 | World Championships | (South Korea) Chungju | 1st | Lightweight Eight | 6:02.27 | Catello Amarante, Petru Zaharia, Simone Molteni, Stefano Oppo; Vincenzo Serpico, Francesco Schisano, Paolo Di Girolamo, Enrico D'Aniello (cox) |
