= Lithuania at the 2015 Summer Universiade =

- IOC code: LTU
- NOC: National Olympic Committee of Lithuania
- Website: http://www.ltok.lt/

in Gwangju, South Korea 3 – 14 July 2015
- Medals Ranked 13th: Gold 5 Silver 1 Bronze 3 Total 9

Summer Universiade appearances
- 1959; 1961; 1963; 1965; 1967; 1970; 1973; 1975; 1977; 1979; 1981; 1983; 1985; 1987; 1989; 1991; 1993; 1995; 1997; 1999; 2001; 2003; 2005; 2007; 2009; 2011; 2013; 2015; 2017; 2019; 2021; 2025; 2027

Lithuania participated at the 2015 Summer Universiade in Gwangju, South Korea.

== Medal summary ==
=== Medal by sports ===
Medals by sport
Sport	1st place, gold medalist(s)	2nd place, silver medalist(s)	3rd place, bronze medalist(s)	Total
Athletics	1	0	1	2
Judo	0	0	2	2
Rowing	4	1	0	5
Total	5	1	3	9

=== Medalists ===
Medal	Name	Sport	Event	Date
Gold	Rolandas Maščinskas; Saulius Ritter	Rowing	Men's Double Sculls	7 July
Gold	Žygimantas Gališanskis	Rowing	Men's Single Sculls	7 July
Gold	Donata Vištartaitė; Milda Valčiukaitė	Rowing	Women's Double Sculls	7 July
Gold	Lina Šaltytė	Rowing	Women's Single Sculls	7 July
Gold	Airinė Palšytė	Athletics	Women's High Jump	12 July
Silver	Sonata Petrikaitė	Rowing	Women's lwt single scull	7 July
Bronze	Santa Pakenytė	Judo	Women's +78 kg	4 July
Bronze	Karolis Bauža	Judo	Men's Open	7 July
Bronze	Andrius Gudžius	Athletics	Men's discus throw	11 July
