= Simon Nola =

Australian rower

Personal information
- Born: 6 June 1984 (age 42)
- Education: St Ignatius' College, Riverview

Sport
- Sport: Rowing
- Club: Sydney Rowing Club

Achievements and titles
- National finals: Penrith Cup 2005 & 2008; Penrith Cup 2013-2015
Medal record
Men's rowing
Representing Australia
World Rowing Championships
Silver medal – second place	2013 Chungju	LM8+

Simon Nola (born 6 June 1984) is an Australian former national representative lightweight rower. He won a silver medal at the 2013 World Rowing Championships.

== Club and state rowing ==
Nola was educated at St Ignatius' College, Riverview where he took up rowing. At varsity he rowed for Macquarie University and his senior club rowing was with the Sydney Rowing Club where he was club captain for 2004-2008.

In 2005 he was first selected a New South Wales lightweight coxless four to contest the Penrith Cup at the Interstate Regatta. He rowed again in the 2008 New South Wales Penrith Cup four. After a gap, he regained selection in 2013 in a New South Wales' Penrith Cup lightweight coxless four. He rowed in further New South Wales Penrith Cup crews in 2014 and 2015 and he stroked the 2014 crew.

In 2006 he contested the men's U23 lightweight single scull title at the Australian Rowing Championships in Sydney Rowing Club colours. In 2007 he contested the lightweight scull and in 2008 the lightweight double-scull.

In 2005 at the Australian University Championships and wearing Macquarie University colours he won the lightweight single sculls title. He defended that title in 2006 and tried again in 2007 when he finished in fifth place.

== International representative rowing ==
Nola first represented Australia at 2013 World Rowing Cup I in Sydney in a heavyweight quad scull which placed fourth. For the 2013 World Rowing Championships in Chungju he stroked the Australian lightweight eight when they achieved a silver world championship medal.
