= Stefano Oppo =

Italian rower (born 1994)

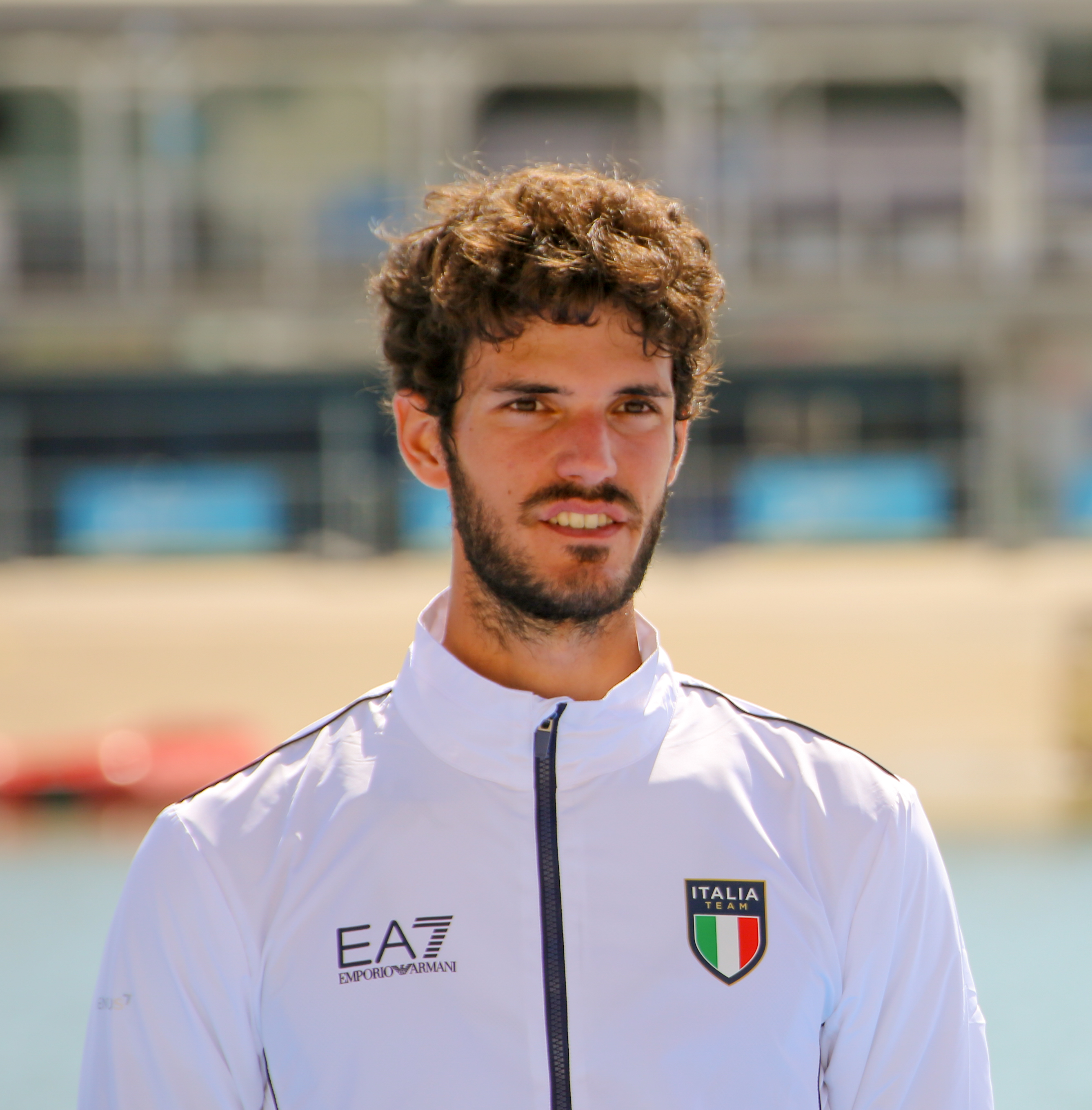
- Oppo in 2018

Personal information
- Born: 12 September 1994 (age 31) Oristano, Italy
- Height: 1.87 m (6 ft 2 in)
- Weight: 70 kg (154 lb)

Sport
- Country: Italy
- Sport: Rowing
- Event: Lightweight double sculls
- Club: Centro Sportivo Carabinieri
Medal record
Men's rowing
Representing Italy
Olympic Games
Event	1st	2nd	3rd
Olympic Games	0	1	1
World Championships	1	4	1
European Championships	1	4	3
Mediterranean Games	1	0	0
Total	3	9	5
Silver medal – second place	2024 Paris	Lwt double sculls
Bronze medal – third place	2020 Tokyo	Lwt double sculls
World Championships
Gold medal – first place	2013 Chungju	Lwt eight
Silver medal – second place	2017 Sarasota	Lwt double sculls
Silver medal – second place	2018 Plovdiv	Lwt double sculls
Silver medal – second place	2019 Ottensheim	Lwt double sculls
Silver medal – second place	2022 Račice	Lwt double sculls
Bronze medal – third place	2023 Belgrade	Lwt double sculls
European Championships
Gold medal – first place	2020 Poznań	Lwt double sculls
Silver medal – second place	2019 Lucerne	Lwt double sculls
Silver medal – second place	2022 Oberschleißheim	Lwt double sculls
Silver medal – second place	2023 Bled	Lwt double sculls
Silver medal – second place	2024 Szeged	Lwt double sculls
Bronze medal – third place	2017 Račice	Lwt double sculls
Bronze medal – third place	2018 Glasgow	Lwt double sculls
Bronze medal – third place	2021 Varese	Lwt double sculls
Mediterranean Games
Gold medal – first place	2018 Tarragona	Lwt double sculls

Stefano Oppo (born 12 September 1994) is an Italian rower. He competed in the men's lightweight coxless four event at the 2016 Summer Olympics and won the bronze medal in the men's lightweight double sculls at the 2020 Summer Olympics.

Oppo is an athlete of the Centro Sportivo Carabinieri.

== Achievements ==
Year	Competition	Venue	Rank	Event	Time	Teammates
2013	World Championships	(South Korea) Chungju	1st	Lightweight Eight	6:02.27	Catello Amarante, Petru Zaharia, Leone Barbaro, Simone Molteni; Vincenzo Serpico, Francesco Schisano, Paolo Di Girolamo, Enrico D'Aniello (cox)
