= Jens Vilhelmsen =

Danish rower (born 1985)

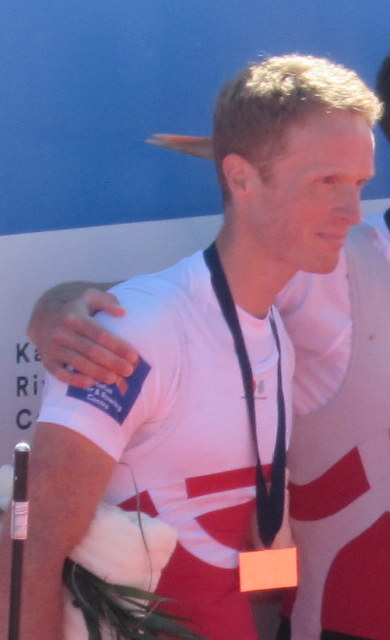

Medal record

Men's rowing

Representing Denmark

World Championships
Silver medal – second place	2009 Poznań	Lwt coxless four
Silver medal – second place	2015 Aiguebelette	Lwt coxless four
Silver medal – second place	2016 Rotterdam	Lwt coxless pair
Bronze medal – third place	2011 Bled	Lwt eight

European Championships
Silver medal – second place	2016 Brandenburg	Lwt coxless pair
Bronze medal – third place	2015 Poznań	Lwt coxless four

Jens Vilhelmsen (born 8 February 1985) is a Danish rower. He has won three silver medals at World Rowing Championships.
