= Mirte Kraaijkamp =

Dutch rower (born 1984)

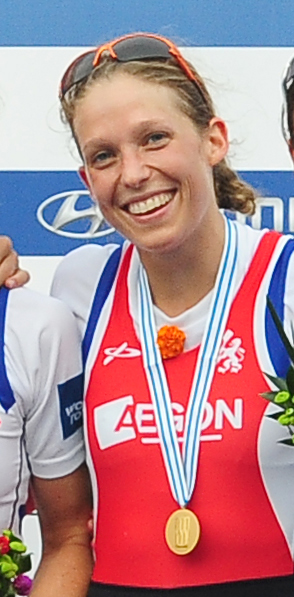
- Kraaijkamp at the 2013 World Championships

Personal information
- Born: 25 April 1984 (age 42) Venray, Netherlands
- Height: 168 cm (5 ft 6 in)
- Weight: 57 kg (126 lb)
Medal record
Women's rowing
Representing the Netherlands
World Championships
Gold medal – first place	2013 Chungjiu	LW4x
Gold medal – first place	2014 Amsterdam	LW4x
Bronze medal – third place	2015 Aiguebelette	LW4x

Mirte Kraaijkamp (born 25 April 1984 in Venray) is a Dutch rower.

She won a gold medal as part of the Netherlands crew in lightweight women's quadruple sculls (LW4x) at the 2013 World Rowing Championships in Chungjiu on 30 August 2013.

Kraaijkamp was part of Netherlands team which set a world record in lightweight women's quadruple sculls (6 minutes 15.95 seconds) at the 2014 World Rowing Championships in Amsterdam on 29 August 2014.

She finished third in the LW4x event at the 2015 World Rowing Championships in Aiguebelette-le-Lac on 4 September 2015.
