= Josh Booth (rower) =

Australian rower (born 1990)

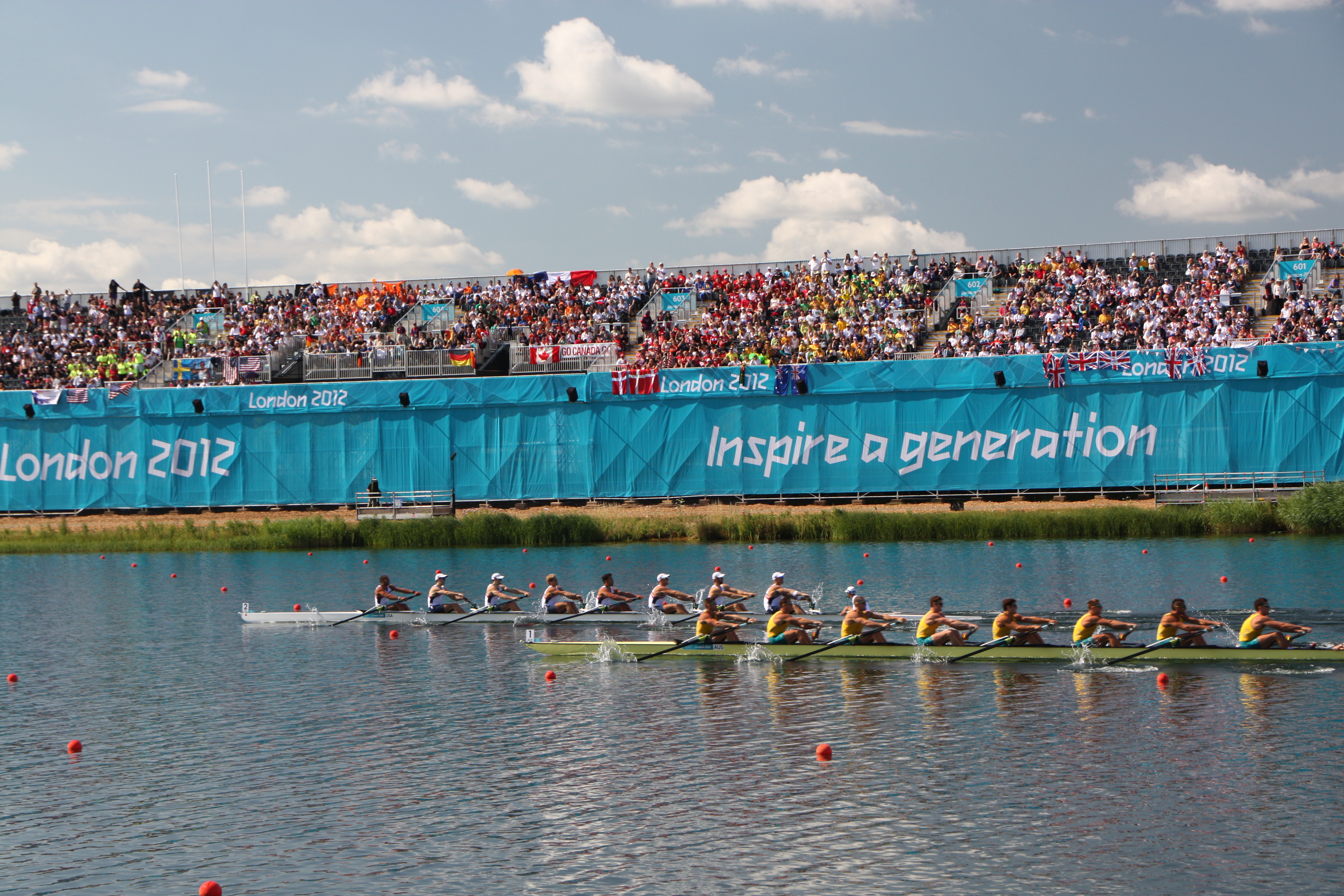

Personal information
- Full name: Joshua Booth
- Born: 9 October 1990 (age 36) Melbourne, Australia
- Height: 190 cm (6 ft 3 in)
- Weight: 93 kg (205 lb)

Sport
- Country: Australia
- Sport: Rowing
- Events: Men's eight (M8+); Men's coxless four (M4-)
- Club: Melbourne University Boat Club
- Coached by: Rhett Ayliffe

Achievements and titles
- Olympic finals: Tokyo 2020 M8+
- National finals: King's Cup 2011–2018
Medal record
Men's rowing
Representing Australia
Olympic Games
Silver medal – second place	2016 Rio de Janeiro	Coxless four
World Championships
Silver medal – second place	2018 Plovdiv	Eight

Joshua Booth (born 9 October 1990) is an Australian rower. He is a triple Olympian and Olympic silver medal winner from Melbourne, Australia. He rowed in the Australian men's eight at the London 2012 Olympics, Rio 2016 and 2020 Summer Olympics|Tokyo 2020 Olympics Joshua has two miniature groodles, Albie and Lenny; and lives in Melbourne.

== Club and state career ==
Born in Melbourne, Booth was educated at Deepdene Primary School and learnt to row at Scotch College in Melbourne. He studied medicine at Melbourne University. Booth's senior club rowing was from the Melbourne University Boat Club.

On ten consecutive occasions from 2011 to 2021 Booth was seated in the Victorian men's eight who contested the King's Cup at Interstate Regatta within the Australian Rowing Championships. In those crews he saw three King's Cup victories in 2015, 2016 and 2021 (on two occasions with Booth at stroke) and six second places.

== International representative rowing ==
Booth made his Australian representative debut in 2010 when selected in the Australian men's U23 eight to contest the World Rowing U23 Championships in Brest, Bulgaria. That crew finished in ninth place. That same year he was picked in a senior Australian coxless four who placed seventh at the 2010 World Rowing Championships in Lake Karapiro.

In 2011 Booth secured a seat in the Australian men's senior eight. They raced at the World Rowing Cup III in Lucerne before contesting the 2011 World Rowing Championships in Bled, Slovenia and finishing in fourth place. In the 2012 Olympic year Booth held his seat in the eight rowing at two World Rowing Cups in the Olympic lead up.

He rowed in the six seat of the men's eight at the 2012 Summer Olympics to a sixth placing. After appearing in the event, he was expelled from the Australian team as a result of an incident in which he broke windows at two small businesses in the Surrey town of Egham while drunk. Having apologised and paid damages to the owner of the damaged properties, he was released without charge by British police.

Booth continued to row at the highest Australian level from the first year of the new Olympiad. He was selected in a coxless four for the 2013 World Rowing Cup I in Sydney and then in 2014 at the World Rowing Cup I he raced in both the Australian eight and in a coxless four. However, in neither of those years did he represent at a World Championship. In 2015 he was back in the Australian senior eight for the World Rowing Cup III and then for the 2015 World Rowing Championships in Aiguebelette where the eight finished in ninth place.

In 2016 along with Josh Dunkley-Smith, Will Lockwood and Alexander Hill, Booth was selected in the Australian men's coxless four to compete at Rio 2016. They won their heat and semi-final and took the silver medal in the final behind Great Britain.

In their second regatta of the 2018 international season and in an Australian selection eight racing as the Georgina Hope Rinehart National Training Centre, in honour of Rowing Australia patron, Gina Rinehart, Booth won the 2018 Grand Challenge Cup at the Henley Royal Regatta. The fourth Australian men's eight to ever do so. The following week at the World Rowing Cup III in Lucerne, Booth rowed in the Australian eight to silver medal in a thrilling 0.14 second finish behind Germany. The stage was set for the close competition that played out at the 2018 World Championships in Plovdiv. In their heat the Australian eight finished 5/100ths of a second behind the US and then in the final, Germany dominated and took gold but 2/10ths of a second separated 2nd through to 4th and the Australians took silver, a bowball ahead of Great Britain with the US out of the medals. Booth rowed at seven and came home with a silver world championship medal.

In 2019, Booth was again selected in the Australian men's sweep squad for the international representative season. In an effort to qualify the men's pair for the 2020 Olympics, different combinations were tried. At the World Rowing Cup II in Poznan and rowing behind the dual world champion Alex Hill, Booth won a gold medal in the Australian men's coxless pair. For the World Rowing Championships III in Rotterdam, Booth was back in the Australian eight which rowed to 6th place. Booth was then selected to race in the Australian men's eight at the 2019 World Rowing Championships in Linz, Austria. The eight were looking for a top five finish at the 2019 World Championships to qualify for the Tokyo Olympics. The eight placed second in their heat and fourth in the final and qualified for Tokyo 2020. In Tokyo the Australian men's eight placed fourth in their heat, fourth in the repechage and sixth in the Olympic A final. Had they repeated their repechage time of 5:25:06 they would have won the silver medal.
