= Jack Price (rower) =

Australian rower

Personal information
- Born: 29 May 1987 (age 39)

Sport
- Sport: Rowing
- Club: Toowong Rowing Club

Achievements and titles
- National finals: Penrith Cup 2011-2016
Medal record
Men's rowing
Representing Australia
World Rowing Championships
Silver medal – second place	2013 Chungju	LM8+

Jack Price (born 29 May 1987) is an Australian former national representative lightweight rower. He is four time national champion and won a silver medal at the 2013 World Rowing Championships.

== Club and state rowing ==
Raised in Queensland, Jack's senior club rowing was with the Toowong Rowing Club in Brisbane. In 2018 he was the Toowong Club Captain.

In 2013 he was first selected in a Queensland lightweight coxless four to contest the Penrith Cup at the Interstate Regatta. He has rowed in six consecutive Queensland Penrith Cup fours from 2013 to 2018 and enjoyed four victories between 2013 and 2016. He stroked the 2017 Queensland four.

Each year from 2006 to 2010 he contested the men's lightweight eight title at the Australian Rowing Championships in Toowong Rowing Club colours.

== International representative rowing ==
Price first represented for Australia at the 2013 World Rowing Championships in Chungju. He was in the bow seat of the Australian men's lightweight eight when they took the silver medal.
