= Paolo Di Girolamo =

Italian rower

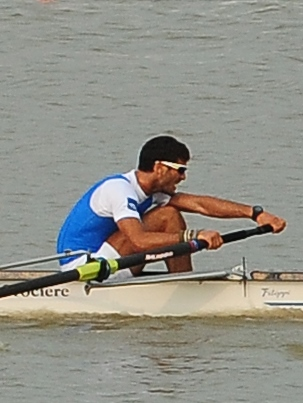

Personal information
- Born: 22 January 1994 (age 32)

Sport
- Sport: Rowing
- Club: Centro Sportivo Carabinieri
Medal record
Men's rowing
Representing Italy
World Rowing Championships
Gold medal – first place	2013 Chungju	Lwt eight

Paolo di Girolamo (born 22 January 1994) is an Italian lightweight rower. He won a gold medal at the 2013 World Rowing Championships in Chungju with the lightweight men's eight.

Di Girolamo is an athlete of the Centro Sportivo Carabinieri.

== Achievements ==
Year	Competition	Venue	Rank	Event	Time	Teammates
2013	World Championships	(South Korea) Chungju	1st	Lightweight Eight	6:02.27	Catello Amarante, Petru Zaharia, Leone Barbaro, Stefano Oppo; Vincenzo Serpico, Francesco Schisano, Simone Molteni, Enrico D'Aniello (cox)
