= Josh Dunkley-Smith =

Australian rower (born 1989)

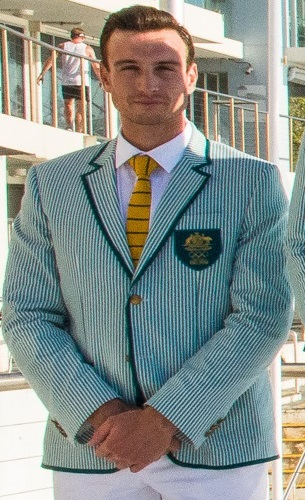
- Dunkley-Smith in 2016

Personal information
- Born: Joshua Dunkley-Smith; 28 June 1989 (age 37) Melbourne, Australia
- Years active: 2006–2018

Sport
- Club: Mercantile Rowing Club
Medal record
Men's rowing
Representing Australia
Olympic Games
Silver medal – second place	2012 London	Coxless four
Silver medal – second place	2016 Rio de Janeiro	Coxless four
World Championships
Silver medal – second place	2013 Chungjiu	Coxless four
Silver medal – second place	2015 Aiguebelette	Coxless four
Bronze medal – third place	2010 Karapiro	Eight
Bronze medal – third place	2011 Bled	Coxless four
Bronze medal – third place	2014 Amsterdam	Coxless four
World Rowing U23 Championships
Bronze medal – third place	U23 2010 Brest	M4-

Joshua Dunkley-Smith (born 28 June 1989 in Geelong, Australia) is an Australian former representative rower. He was a national champion, a dual Olympian, two-time silver Olympic medal winner, and won medals at five World Rowing Championships.

== Personal ==
Dunkley-Smith attended Albert Park Primary and learned to row at The Geelong College. He rowed in The Geelong College first VIII in Victorian Schools Head of the River races in 2006 and 2007.

Dunkley-Smith studied for a B.Arts in Journalism at Monash University. After his return from the Olympics in 2012, Dunkley-Smith took up coaching at Melbourne Girls Grammar.

His mother, Addy Bucek, is a former Australian Olympic sailing representative. His younger sister, Addy, was also an Australian representative rower.

He retired from competitive rowing following the 2018 King's Cup, which was his ninth state representative appearance for Victoria in that event.

== Club and state rowing ==
Dunkley-Smith's senior club rowing was from the Mercantile Rowing Club in Melbourne.

His was first selected to Victorian state representative honours in the 2008 Victorian youth eight, who won the Noel F Wilkinson Trophy at the Interstate Regatta within the Australian Rowing Championships. In 2009, he was again selected in the youth eight, and he stroked the crew to his second victory in that event. On nine consecutive occasions from 2010 to 2018, Dunkley-Smith was seated in the Victorian men's senior eight who contested the King's Cup at the Australian Rowing Championships. In those crews he saw two King's Cup victories and six times placed second. He stroked four of those Victorian eights in King's Cup races.

On 10 March 2018, he set a world record for 2000m on an indoor rowing machine, setting a time of 5:35.8, beating Rob Waddell's record of 5:36.6 (for the 30–39 age category) which was set in 2008. Dunkley-Smith's effort also beat a 1999 mark Rob Waddell had set for the 19–29 age category.

== International representative rowing ==
Dunkley-Smith made his national representative debut in 2009 when he was selected to stroke an Australian U23 eight to contest the World Rowing U23 Championships in Racice. That eight placed fourth. That same year, he achieved his first senior representative selection in the Australian senior men's eight, who raced to a seventh placing at the 2009 World Rowing Championships in Poznan, Poland.

In 2010, Dunkley-Smith competed in an Australian coxless four, winning gold at the World Rowing Cup II in Munich and in the men's eight who took silver at the World Rowing Cup III in Lucerne. He then competed in an U23 coxless four at the 2010 World Rowing U23 Championships in Brest before three months later winning his first senior World Championship medal at Lake Karapiro 2010—a bronze in the men's eight.

In 2011, Dunkley-Smith secured a seat in the Australian senior coxless four, and for the next five years he rowed in that boat consistently at Olympics and at World Championships. That year with Samuel Loch, Nicholas Purnell and Drew Ginn, Dunkley-Smith won a bronze medal at the World Championships at Bled 2011.

At the 2012 London Olympics, Dunkley-Smith won a silver medal in the Australian coxless four with Drew Ginn, James Chapman and Will Lockwood. Ginn's presence in the crew gave it a lineage to the successful Australian men's four crews of the 1990s that were known as the Oarsome Foursomes.

In 2013, Dunkley-Smith, Alexander Lloyd, Spencer Turrin and Will Lockwood won the silver in the four at the 2013 World Championships in Chungju after having won or placed at three World Rowing Cups that year. With Lockwood changed out for Fergus Pragnell, Dunkley-Smith, Lloyd and Turrin won a bronze medal at the 2014 World Championships in Amsterdam. As in 2013 they had performed strongly in the lead-up winning or placing at three World Rowing Cups.

Dunkley-Smith was originally selected for the Australian men's eight in 2015, but an injury to Alex Lloyd led to him being put into the two seat of the four. At the 2015 World Championships, Dunkley-Smith, Lockwood, Alexander Hill and Spencer Turrin won the silver medal in the men's four.

In 2016, along with Will Lockwood, Joshua Booth, and Alex Hill, Dunkley-Smith was selected in the Australian Men's Coxless four to compete at Rio 2016. They placed second and third at two lead-up World Rowing Cups in Europe and in Rio de Janeiro at the 2016 Summer Olympics; they won their heat and semi-final and took the silver medal behind the fancied Great Britain crew in the final. It was Dunkley-Smith's last international appearance for Australia and a fitting end to a stellar representative career.

== Rowing Results ==
=== Olympics ===
- 2012 London Olympics M4- stroke – silver
- 2016 Rio Olympics M4- two seat – silver

=== World Championships ===
- 2009 World Rowing U23 Championships men's eight stroke – fourth
- 2009 World Rowing Championships men's eight two seat – seventh
- 2010 World Rowing U23 Championships coxless four stroke – bronze
- 2010 World Rowing Championships men's Eight stroke – bronze
- 2011 World Rowing Championships coxless four stroke – bronze
- 2013 World Rowing Championships coxless four stroke – silver
- 2014 World Rowing Championships coxless four two seat – bronze
- 2015 World Rowing Championships coxless four two seat – silver

=== National Interstate Regatta ===
- 2008 – Interstate Championships Men's Youth Eight three seat – first
- 2009 – Interstate Championships Men's Youth Eight stroke – first
- 2010 – Interstate Championships Men's Eight stroke – second
- 2011 – Interstate Championships Men's Eight six seat – second
- 2012 – Interstate Championships Men's Eight stroke – second
- 2013 – Interstate Championships Men's Eight stroke – second

- 2014 – Interstate Championships Men's Eight stroke – third
- 2015 – Interstate Championships Men's Eight six seat – first
- 2016 – Interstate Championships Men's Eight – first
- 2017 – Interstate Championships Men's Eight – second
- 2018 – Interstate Championships Men's Eight six seat – second
