= Sam Scrimgeour =

British lightweight rower (born 1988)

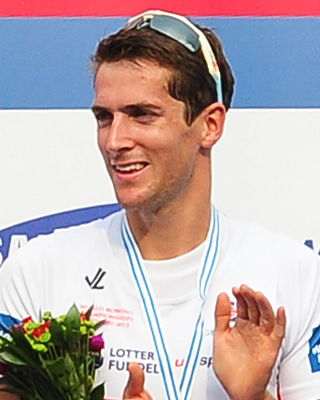
- Scrimgeour at 2013 world championship

Personal information
- Born: 28 January 1988 (age 38)

Sport
- Sport: Rowing
Medal record
Men's rowing
Representing Great Britain
World Championships
Gold medal – first place	2015 Aiguebelette	Lwt coxless pair
Bronze medal – third place	2013 Chungju	Lwt coxless pair
Bronze medal – third place	2014 Amsterdam	Lwt coxless pair
Bronze medal – third place	2016 Rotterdam	Lwt coxless pair
European Championships
Gold medal – first place	2016 Brandenburg	Lwt coxless pair
Silver medal – second place	2012 Varese	Lwt coxless four
Silver medal – second place	2014 Belgrade	Lwt coxless pair

Sam Scrimgeour (born 28 January 1988) is a British lightweight rower.

== Rowing career ==
Scrimgeour competed at the 2013 World Rowing Championships in Chungju, where he won a bronze medal as part of the lightweight coxless pair with Mark Aldred. He then competed at the 2014 World Rowing Championships in Bosbaan, Amsterdam, where he won a bronze medal as part of the lightweight coxless pair with Jono Clegg. The following year he was part of the British team that topped the medal table at the 2015 World Rowing Championships at Lac d'Aiguebelette in France, where he won a gold medal as part of the lightweight coxless pair with Joel Cassells.

He won a bronze medal at the 2016 World Rowing Championships in Rotterdam, Netherlands, as part of the lightweight coxless pair with Joel Cassells.
