= Timothy Widdicombe =

Australian rower (born 1990)

Personal information
- Born: 6 March 1990 (age 36)

Sport
- Sport: Rowing
- Club: Uni of WA Rowing Club

Achievements and titles
- National finals: Penrith Cup 2012-17
Medal record
Men's rowing
Representing Australia
World Rowing Championships
Silver medal – second place	2013 Chungju	LM8+

Timothy Widdicombe (born 6 March 1990) is an Australian former national representative lightweight rower. He won a silver medal at the 2013 World Rowing Championships.

== Club and state rowing ==
Raised in Perth Western Australia, Widdicombe's senior club rowing was with the University of Western Australia Rowing Club.

Ward was first selected for West Australia in the 2009 youth eight which contested the Noel Wilkinson Trophy at the Interstate Regatta within the Australian Rowing Championships. In 2010 he again rowed in the West Australian youth eight. Both those youth eights won silver medals.

In 2012 he was selected in Western Australia's lightweight coxless four to contest the Penrith Cup at the Interstate Regatta. He rowed in six consecutive West Australian Penrith Cup fours from 2013 to 2017 earning a Penrith Cup victory in 2017. He stroked the 2014, 2015, 2016 and 2017 crews and took the silver medal on four occasions.

== International representative rowing ==
Widdicombe first represented Australia at the 2010 World Rowing U23 Championships in Brest in a lightweight coxless four which placed twelfth. He held his seat in the Australian U23 lightweight coxless four for the next two years, rowing to eight place at the 2011 World Rowing U23 Championships in Amsterdam and to sixth place at the 2012 championships in Trakai.

In 2013 he was elevated to the Australian senior lightweight squad and came into contention for the lightweight eight. At the World Rowing Cup I in Sydney he raced in both the eight and in a lightweight coxless four. For the 2013 World Rowing Championships in Chungju he rowed in the three seat of the Australian lightweight eight when they achieved a silver world championship medal.
