= Will Lockwood (rower) =

Australian rower (born 1988)

Personal information
- Born: 13 May 1988 (age 38) Fitzroy, Victoria, Australia
- Spouse: Jessica Hall (m. 2019)

Sport
- Club: Melbourne University Boat Club

Achievements and titles
- National finals: King's Cup 2010-16
Medal record
Men's rowing
Representing Australia
Olympic Games
Silver medal – second place	2012 London	Coxless four
Silver medal – second place	2016 Rio de Janeiro	Coxless four
World Championships
Silver medal – second place	2011 Bled	M2+
Silver medal – second place	2013 Chungjiu	M4−
Silver medal – second place	2015 Aiguebelette	M4−
Bronze medal – third place	2010 Karapiro	M8+
World Rowing U23 Championships
Bronze medal – third place	U23 2010 Brest	M4-

William Lockwood (born 13 May 1988) is an Australian former representative rower. A national champion, dual Olympian and two time Olympic silver medal winner, Lockwood represented at the international level for seven consecutive years.

== Club and state rowing ==
Lockwood attended Camberwell Primary and then Scotch College, Melbourne where he took up rowing. His senior club rowing was from the Melbourne University Boat Club.

On six occasions from 2010 to 2016 Lockwood was seated in the Victorian men's senior eight who contested the King's Cup at the Interstate Regatta within the Australian Rowing Championships. In those crews Lockwood saw two King's Cup victories and three times placed second.

== International career ==
Lockwood's national representative debut was in 2009 when he was selected in the Australian U23 men's eight who contested the World Rowing U23 Championships in Racice and placed fourth. In 2010 he contested two World Rowing Cups in Europe in a coxless four and in the senior eight before again being selected for the World Rowing U23 Championships in Brest where he rowed in the coxless four that took the bronze medal. That same year he was in the bow seat of the Australian men's eight that won bronze at the senior 2010 World Championships. At the 2011 World Championships, he won silver in the men's coxed pair with James Chapman and David Webster as cox.

At the 2012 London Olympics, Lockwood won a silver medal in the Australian men's coxless four with Drew Ginn, James Chapman, and Josh Dunkley-Smith. Ginn's presence in that crew gave it a lineage to the successful Australian M4- crews of the 1990s that were known as Oarsome Foursomes.

In 2013 he won the silver medal at the World Championships in the men's four with Alexander Lloyd, Spencer Turrin and Josh Dunkley-Smith. At the 2015 World Rowing Championships on Lac d'Aiguebelette, Aiguebelette in France he won the silver medal in the men's coxless four in a crew with Spencer Turrin and Josh Dunkley-Smith and Alexander Hill.

In 2016 along with Josh Dunkley-Smith, Joshua Booth, and Alexander Hill, Lockwood was selected in the Australian Men's Coxless four to compete at Rio 2016. They won their heat and semi-final and took the silver medal behind Great Britain in the final.

== Personal ==
Lockwood retired at the end of 2017 citing a desire to build a career in the construction industry whilst still coaching schoolboy rowing in Brisbane. In 2019, he married former Australian representative rower and Olympian, Jessica Hall in Melbourne, Australia.
