= Alexis Guérinot =

French rower

Personal information
- Born: 3 March 1995 (age 31)

Sport
- Sport: Rowing
Medal record
Men's rowing
Representing France
World Championships
Gold medal – first place	2016 Rotterdam	Lwt coxless pair
Silver medal – second place	2015 Aiguebelette	Lwt eight

Alexis Guérinot (born 3 March 1995) is a French lightweight rower. He won a gold medal at the 2016 World Rowing Championships in Rotterdam with the lightweight men's coxless pair.
