= Joel Cassells =

British rower

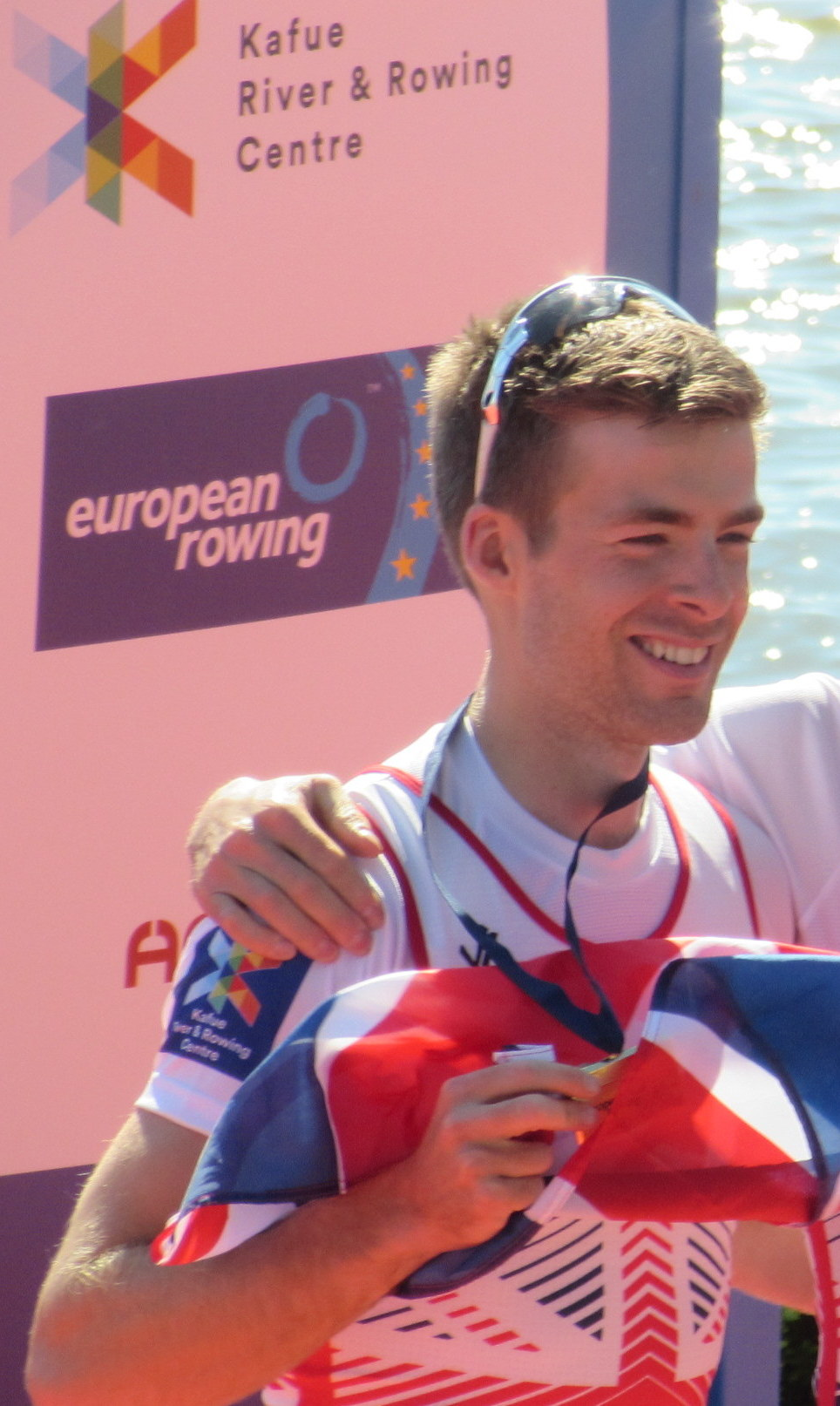

Personal information
- Born: 15 June 1994 (age 32) Ballymoney, United Kingdom
Medal record
Men's rowing
Representing Great Britain
World Championships
Gold medal – first place	2015 Aiguebelette	Lwt coxless pair
Bronze medal – third place	2016 Rotterdam	Lwt coxless pair
European Championships
Gold medal – first place	2015 Poznań	Lwt coxless pair
Gold medal – first place	2016 Brandenburg	Lwt coxless pair

Joel Cassells (born 15 June 1994) is a British rower who made his mark on the senior stage during his relatively short international career, winning gold at the World and European Championships and is focusing on Coaching the next generation of rowers.

== Rowing career ==
Joel starting rowing in 2006 at Bann Rowing Club. He then moved to Oxford for his university education where he competed for Oxford Brookes University Boat Club. In 2014 he stroked the eight which won the Temple Challenge Cup at Henley Royal Regatta. He won the gold medal in the lightweight men's coxless pair competition at the 2015 European Rowing Championships. He was part of the British team that topped the medal table at the 2015 World Rowing Championships at Lac d'Aiguebelette in France, where he won a gold medal as part of the lightweight coxless pair with Sam Scrimgeour.

He won a bronze medal at the 2016 World Rowing Championships in Rotterdam, Netherlands, as part of the lightweight coxless pair with Sam Scrimgeour.

He announced his retirement from international rowing in April 2017, returning to row for Oxford Brookes University Boat Club and focus on coaching the next generation of rowers.

== Coaching career ==
Joel coached rowing at Kew House School Boat Club in West London. He coached the very successful at the time J15 Quad in the 2020/2021 racing season.

== Molesey rowing club ==
Joel is captain of Molesey Boat Club.

== Other pursuits ==
Joel is also a part of the Castore Sportswear Academy.
