= Jonas Kilthau =

German lightweight rower (born 1991)

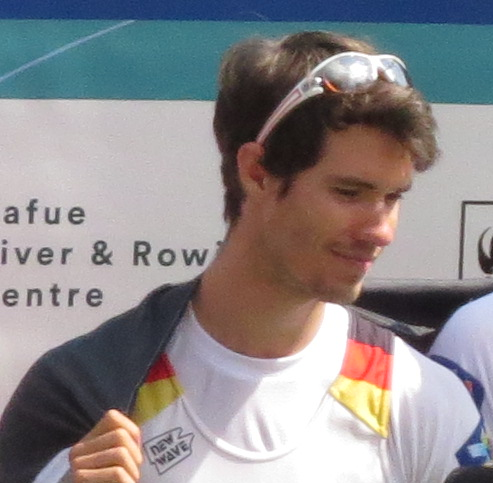

Personal information
- Born: 23 April 1991 (age 35)

Sport
- Sport: Rowing
Medal record
Men's rowing
Representing Germany
World Rowing Championships
Gold medal – first place	2014 Amsterdam	Lwt eight
Bronze medal – third place	2015 Aiguebelette	Lwt pair

Jonas Kilthau (born 23 April 1991) is a German lightweight rower. He won a gold medal at the 2014 World Rowing Championships in Amsterdam with the lightweight men's eight.
