= Enrico D'Aniello =

Italian rower (born 1995)

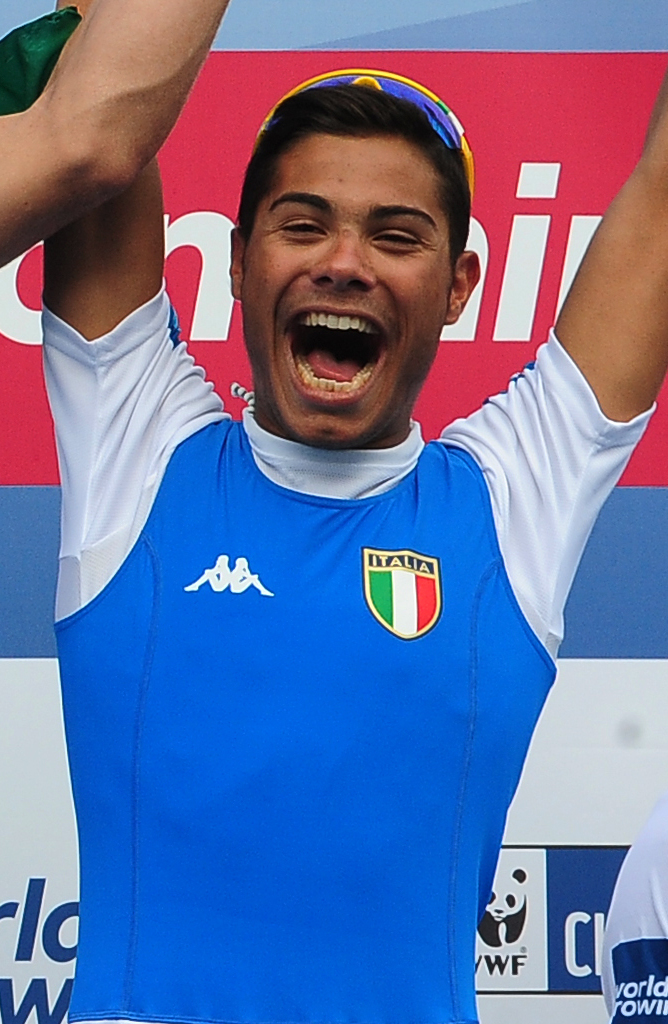
- D'Aniello in 2013

Personal information
- Born: 6 December 1995 (age 30) Castellammare di Stabia, Italy

Sport
- Sport: Rowing
Medal record
Men's rowing
Representing Italy
World Championships
| Gold medal – first place | 2013 Chungju | Coxed pair |
| Gold medal – first place | 2013 Chungju | Lwt eight |
| Bronze medal – third place | 2017 Sarasota | Eight |
European Championships
| Gold medal – first place | 2012 Varese | Eight |
| Bronze medal – third place | 2022 Oberschleißheim | Eight |
| Bronze medal – third place | 2024 Szeged | PR3 Mix4+ |

Enrico D'Aniello (born 6 December 1995) is an Italian coxswain. He competed in the men's eight event at the 2016 Summer Olympics. He has won several gold medals at the World Rowing Championships.

== Achievements ==
| Year | Competition | Venue | Rank | Event | Time | Teammates |
|---|---|---|---|---|---|---|
| 2013 | World Championships | (South Korea) Chungju | 1st | Lightweight Eight | 6:02.27 | Catello Amarante, Petru Zaharia, Leone Barbaro, Stefano Oppo; Vincenzo Serpico, Francesco Schisano, Paolo Di Girolamo, Simone Molteni |
