= Greta Masserano =

Italian female rower

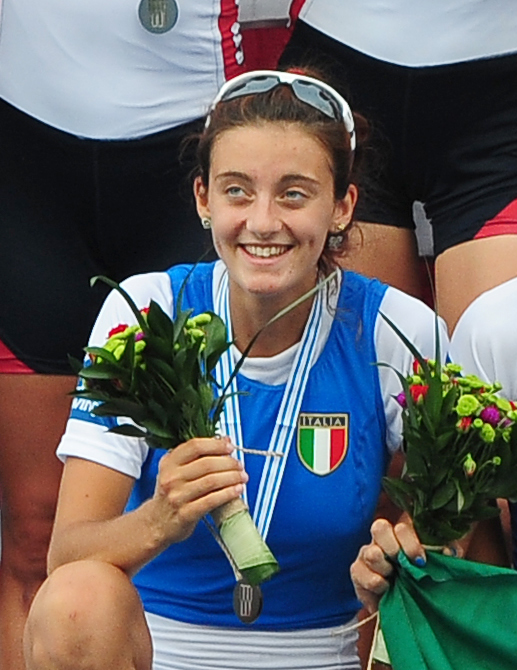
- Masserano in 2013.

Personal information
- National team: Italy
- Born: 16 December 1994 (age 31) Turin, Italy
- Height: 1.70 m (5 ft 7 in)
- Weight: 57 kg (126 lb)

Sport
- Sport: Rowing
- Club: CUS Torino
- Coached by: Mauro Tontodonati
Medal record
Event	1st	2nd	3rd
World Championships	0	0	1
World U23 Championships	1	0	1
European Junior Championships	1	0	0
Total	2	0	2

Greta Masserano (born 16 December 1994) is an Italian lightweight rower bronze medal winner at senior level at the World Rowing Championships.

== Achievements ==
Year	Competition	Venue	Rank	Event	Time
2013	World Championships	(South Korea) Chungju	3rd	Lightweight quadruple sculls	6:57.06
