= Netherlands at the 2015 Summer Universiade =

- IOC code: NED
- NOC: Dutch Olympic Committee
- Website: http://www.nocnsf.nl

in Gwangju, South Korea 3 – 14 July 2015
- Competitors: 58 in 9 sports
- Medals Ranked 48th: Gold 0 Silver 1 Bronze 7 Total 8

Summer Universiade appearances
- 1959; 1961; 1963; 1965; 1967; 1970; 1973; 1975; 1977; 1979; 1981; 1983; 1985; 1987; 1989; 1991; 1993; 1995; 1997; 1999; 2001; 2003; 2005; 2007; 2009; 2011; 2013; 2015; 2017; 2019; 2021; 2025; 2027

Netherlands competes at the 2015 Summer Universiade in Gwangju, South Korea.

== Medal by sports ==
Medals by sport
Sport	1st place, gold medalist(s)	2nd place, silver medalist(s)	3rd place, bronze medalist(s)	Total
Judo	0	0	1	1
Rowing	0	1	5	6
Taekwondo	0	0	1	1
Total	0	1	7	8

== Medalists ==
Medal	Name	Sport	Event	Date
Silver	David Fox; Petrus Adrianus Grunder; Jasper Tissen; Vincent Klaassens	Rowing	Men's Coxless Four	6 July
Bronze	Jennifer Wichers	Judo	Women's -63 kg Welterweight	5 July
Bronze	Jort Timmer; Djimmer Smits	Rowing	Men's Coxless Pairs	6 July
Bronze	Annemarie Bernhard; Marleen Verburgh; Rosa Bas; Kyra Vries De	Rowing	Women's Coxless Four	6 July
Bronze	Florian Kostelijk; Sjoerd Dijkstra; Sander Josephus De Graaf; Wouter Borghs; Wouter Franciscus Withagen; Henricus Groesen Van; Dirk Adriaanse; Reinier Spillenaar Bilgen; Marcus Hummelink	Rowing	Men's Eight Coxed	7 July
Bronze	Koen Metsemakers	Rowing	Men's Single Sculls	7 July
Bronze	Marloes Oldenburg	Rowing	Women's Single Sculls	7 July
Bronze	Reshime Oogink	Taekwondo	Women's -73 kg middleweight	12 July
