= Augustin Mouterde =

French rower (born 1991)

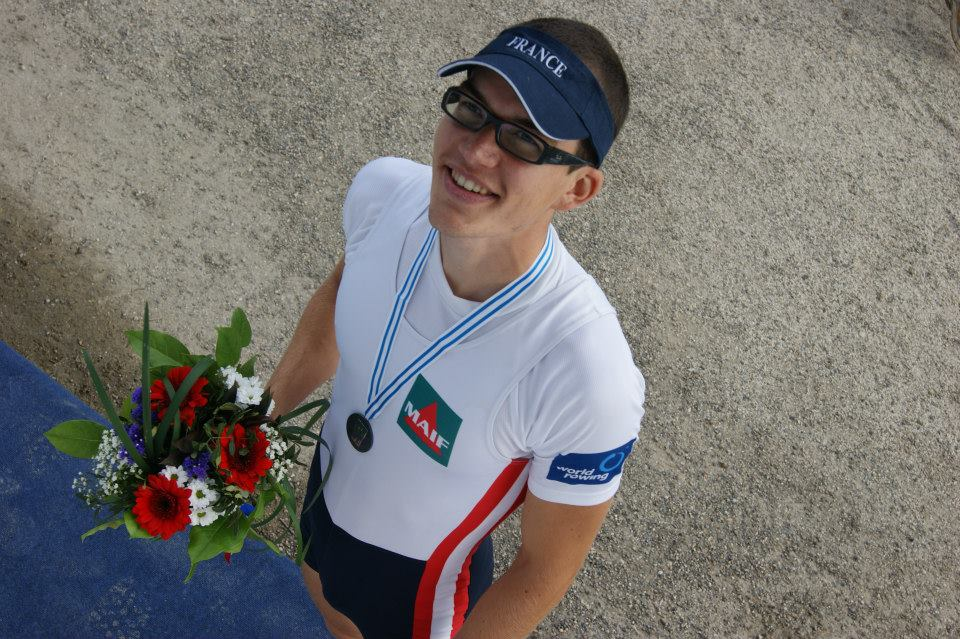

Personal information
- Born: 25 September 1991 (age 34)

Sport
- Sport: Rowing
Medal record
Men's rowing
Representing France
World Championships
Gold medal – first place	2016 Rotterdam	Lwt coxless pair
Silver medal – second place	2014 Amsterdam	Lwt coxless pair
Silver medal – second place	2015 Aiguebelette	Lwt coxless pair
European Championships
Silver medal – second place	2015 Poznań	Lwt coxless pair
Bronze medal – third place	2013 Seville	Lwt coxless four
Bronze medal – third place	2014 Belgrade	Lwt coxless four

Augustin Mouterde (born 25 September 1991) is a French lightweight rower. He won a gold medal at the 2016 World Rowing Championships in Rotterdam with the lightweight men's coxless pair.
