= Frederik Böhm =

German rowing cox

Personal information
- Born: 27 November 1985 (age 40)

Sport
- Sport: Rowing
Medal record
Men's rowing
Representing Germany
World Rowing Championships
Gold medal – first place	2014 Amsterdam	Lwt eight

Frederik Böhm (born 27 November 1985) is a German coxswain. He won a gold medal at the 2014 World Rowing Championships in Amsterdam with the lightweight men's eight.
