= 2013 World Rowing Championships =

International rowing event

- Venue: Tangeum Lake
- Location: Chungju, South Korea
- Dates: 25 August to 1 September
- Competitors: 878 from 73 nations

The 2013 World Rowing Championships were World Rowing Championships that were held from 25 August to 1 September 2013 at Tangeum Lake, Chungju in South Korea. The annual week-long rowing regatta was organized by FISA (the International Rowing Federation). In non-Olympic Games years the regatta is the highlight of the international rowing calendar.

== Medal summary ==
=== Men's events ===
Non-Olympic classes

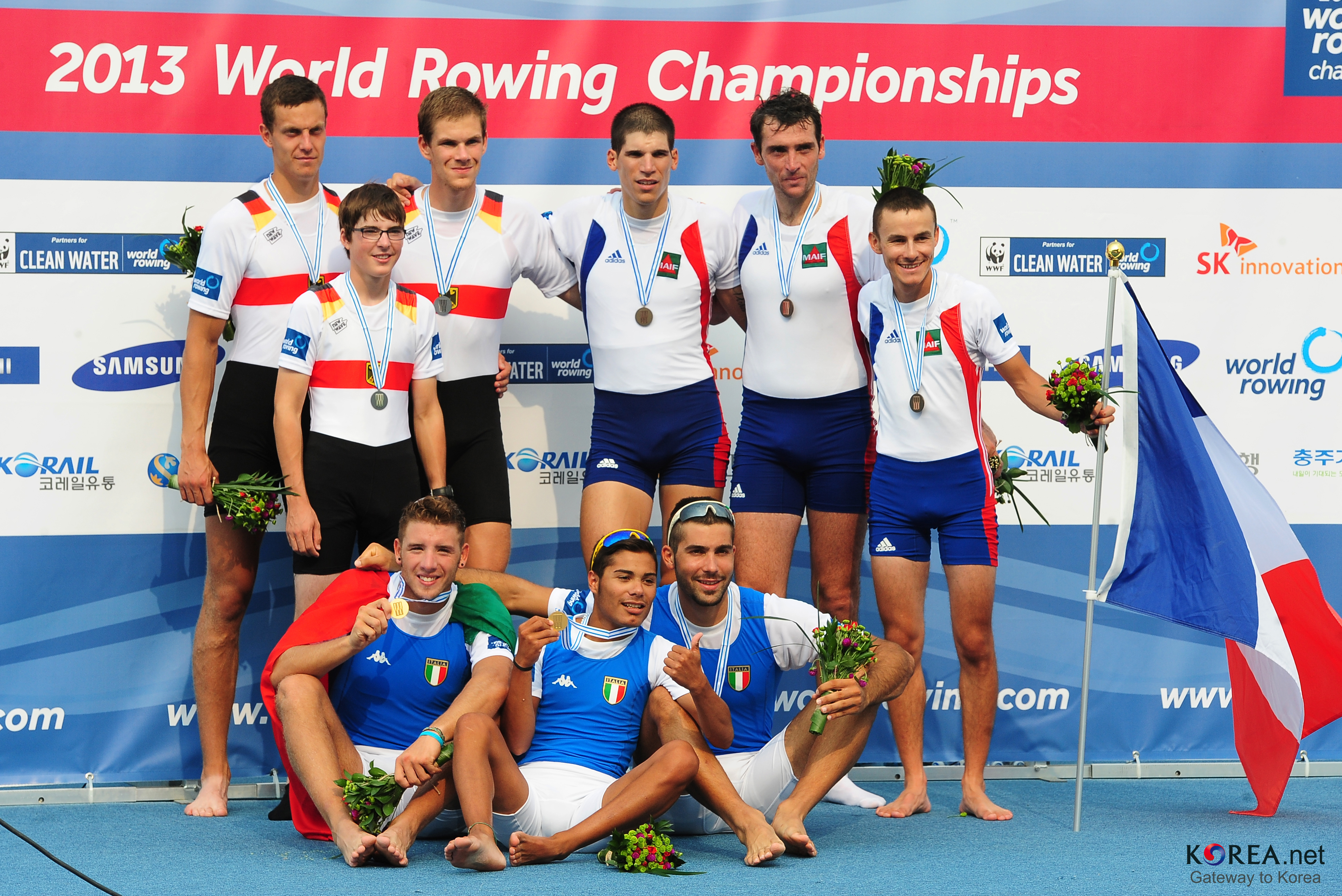
Men's coxed pairs (M2+) medallists

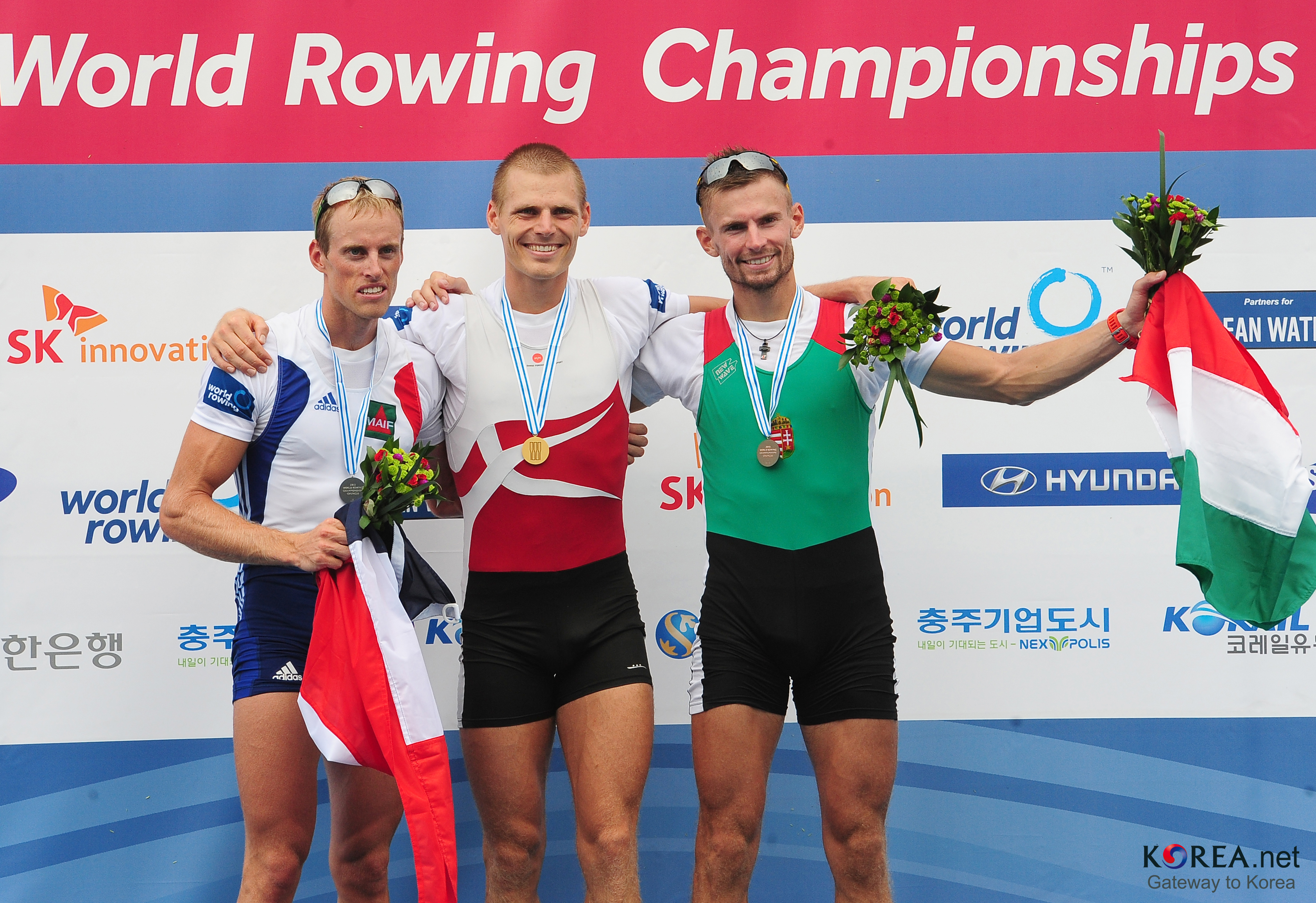
Men's lightweight single sculls medallists

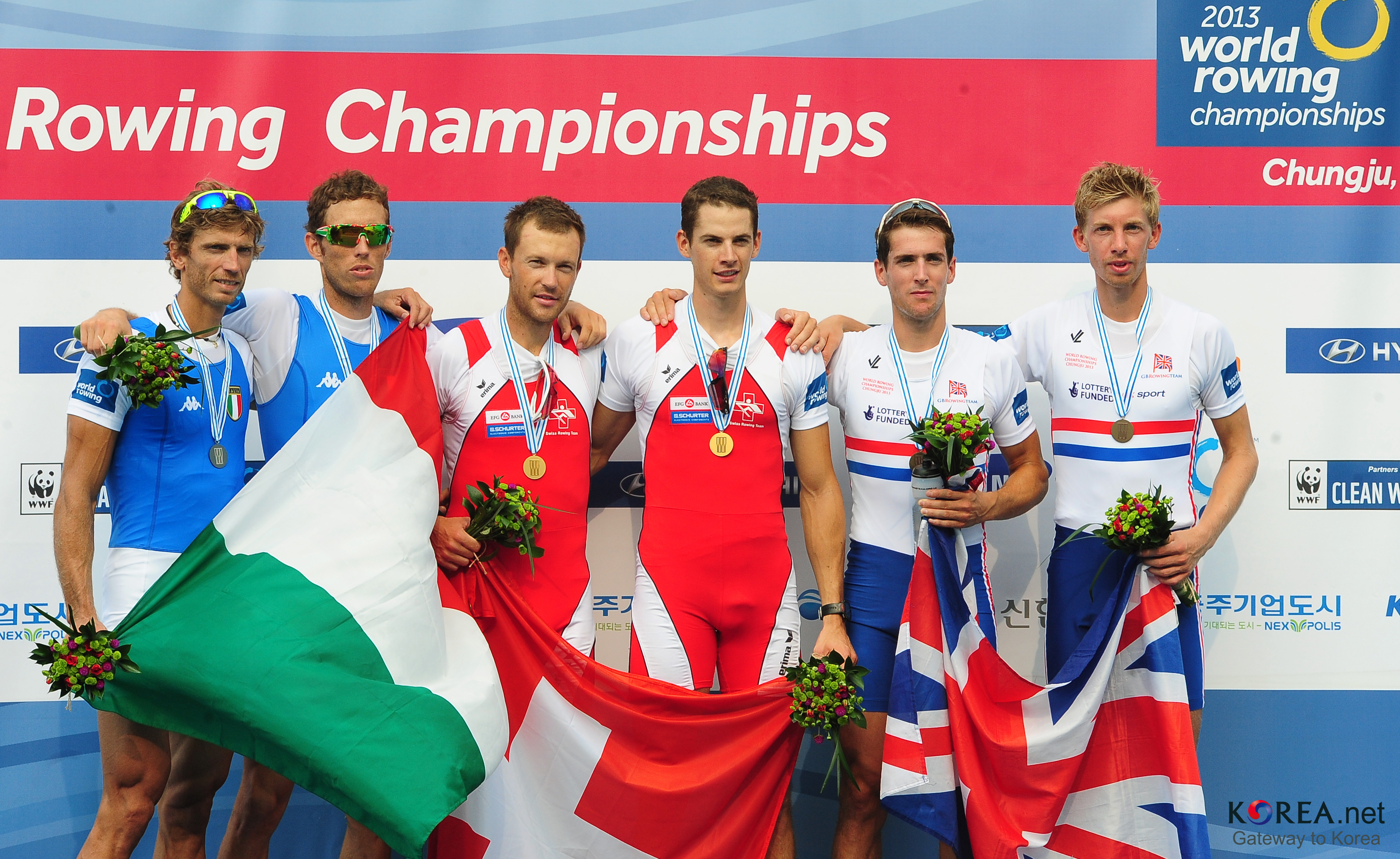
Men's lightweight pair (LM2-) medallists

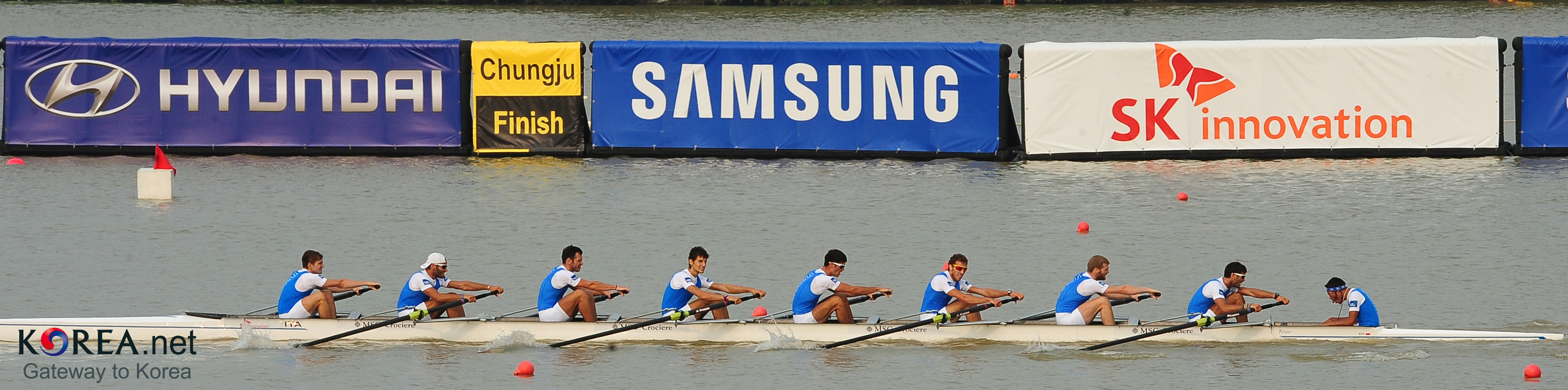
Italian lightweight men's eight – Gold

Event:	Gold:	Time	Silver:	Time	Bronze:	Time
M1x	Czech Republic; Ondřej Synek	6:45.24	Cuba; Ángel Fournier	6:48.91	Germany; Marcel Hacker	6:49.39
M2x	Norway; Nils Jakob Hoff; Kjetil Borch	6:09.51	Lithuania; Rolandas Maščinskas; Saulius Ritter	6:10.87	Italy; Francesco Fossi; Romano Battisti	6:12.54
M4x	Croatia; David Šain; Martin Sinković; Damir Martin; Valent Sinković	5:53.57	Germany; Karl Schulze; Paul Heinrich; Lauritz Schoof; Tim Grohmann	5:54.39	Great Britain; Graeme Thomas; Sam Townsend; Charles Cousins; Peter Lambert	5:54.78
M2-	New Zealand; Eric Murray; Hamish Bond	6:34.98	France; Germain Chardin; Dorian Mortelette	6:41.74	Netherlands; Rogier Blink; Mitchel Steenman	6:45.67
M4-	Netherlands; Boaz Meylink; Kaj Hendriks; Mechiel Versluis; Robert Lücken	6:13.95	Australia; Will Lockwood; Alexander Lloyd; Spencer Turrin; Josh Dunkley-Smith	6:14.58	United States; Grant James; Seth Weil; Henrik Rummel; Michael Gennaro	6:15.46
M2+	Italy; Luca Parlato; Vincenzo Abbagnale; Enrico D'Aniello	7:09.15	Germany; Paul Schröter; Bastian Bechler; Jonas Wiesen	7:12.34	France; Matthieu Moinaux; Laurent Cadot; Benjamin Manceau	7:13.50
M8+	Great Britain; Daniel Ritchie; Tom Ransley; Alex Gregory; Pete Reed; Moe Sbihi; Andrew Triggs Hodge; George Nash; Will Satch; Phelan Hill	5:30.35	Germany; Hannes Ocik; Maximilian Munski; Eric Johannesen; Maximilian Reinelt; Anton Braun; Felix Drahotta; Richard Schmidt; Kristof Wilke; Martin Sauer	5:30.89	United States; Ian Silveira; Ross James; Nareg Guregian; Ambrose Puttmann; Austin Hack; Stephen Kasprzyk; Thomas Dethlefs; Thomas Peszek; Zachary Vlahos	5:33.92
Men's lightweight events
LM1x	Denmark; Henrik Stephansen	7:11.13	France; Jérémie Azou	7:12.94	Hungary; Péter Galambos	7:14.38
LM2x	Norway; Kristoffer Brun; Are Strandli	6:36.04	Switzerland; Simon Schürch; Mario Gyr	6:37.11	Great Britain; Richard Chambers; Peter Chambers	6:38.04
LM4x	Greece; Georgios Konsolas; Spyridon Giannaros; Panagiotis Magdanis; Eleftherios Konsolas	6:03.44	Germany; Moritz Moos; Julius Peschel; Jonas Schützeberg; Jason Osborne	6:05.55	Italy; Paolo Ghidini; Matteo Mulas; Andrea Cereda; Francesco Rigon	6:07.19
LM2-	Switzerland; Simon Niepmann; Lucas Tramèr	6:49.85	Italy; Elia Luini; Martino Goretti	6:51.48	Great Britain; Sam Scrimgeour; Mark Aldred	6:52.08
LM4-	Denmark; Kasper Winther Jørgensen; Jacob Larsen; Jacob Barsøe; Morten Jørgensen	5:55.68	New Zealand; James Hunter; James Lassche; Peter Taylor; Curtis Rapley	5:57.28	Great Britain; Adam Freeman-Pask; Will Fletcher; Jono Clegg; Chris Bartley	5:59.98
LM8+	Italy; Simone Molteni; Catello Amarante; Petru Zaharia; Leone Barbaro; Stefano Oppo; Vincenzo Serpico; Francesco Schisano; Paolo di Girolamo; Enrico D'Aniello	6:02.27	Australia; Jack Price; Timothy McDonnell; Timothy Widdicombe; Alister Foot; Blair Tunevitsch; Darryn Purcell; Nicholas Silcox; Simon Nola; Timothy Webster	6:06.51	United States; David Morgenstern; Bryan Pape; Tobin McGee; Brendan Mulvey; Dorian Weber; Joshua Getz; Peter Gibson; Sean Gibel; Michael Hwang	6:10.20

=== Women's events ===
Non-Olympic classes

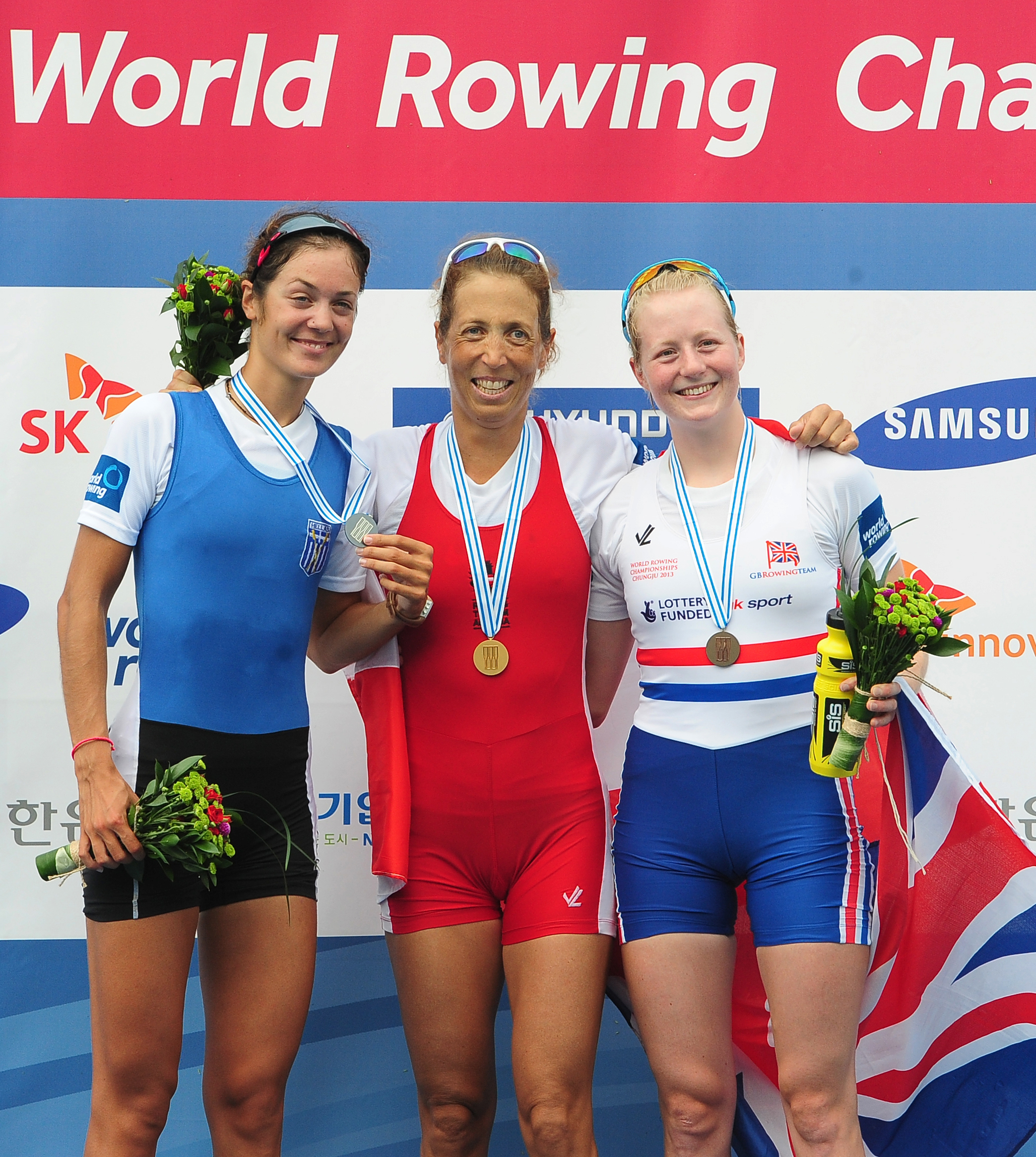
Women's lightweight single sculls medallists

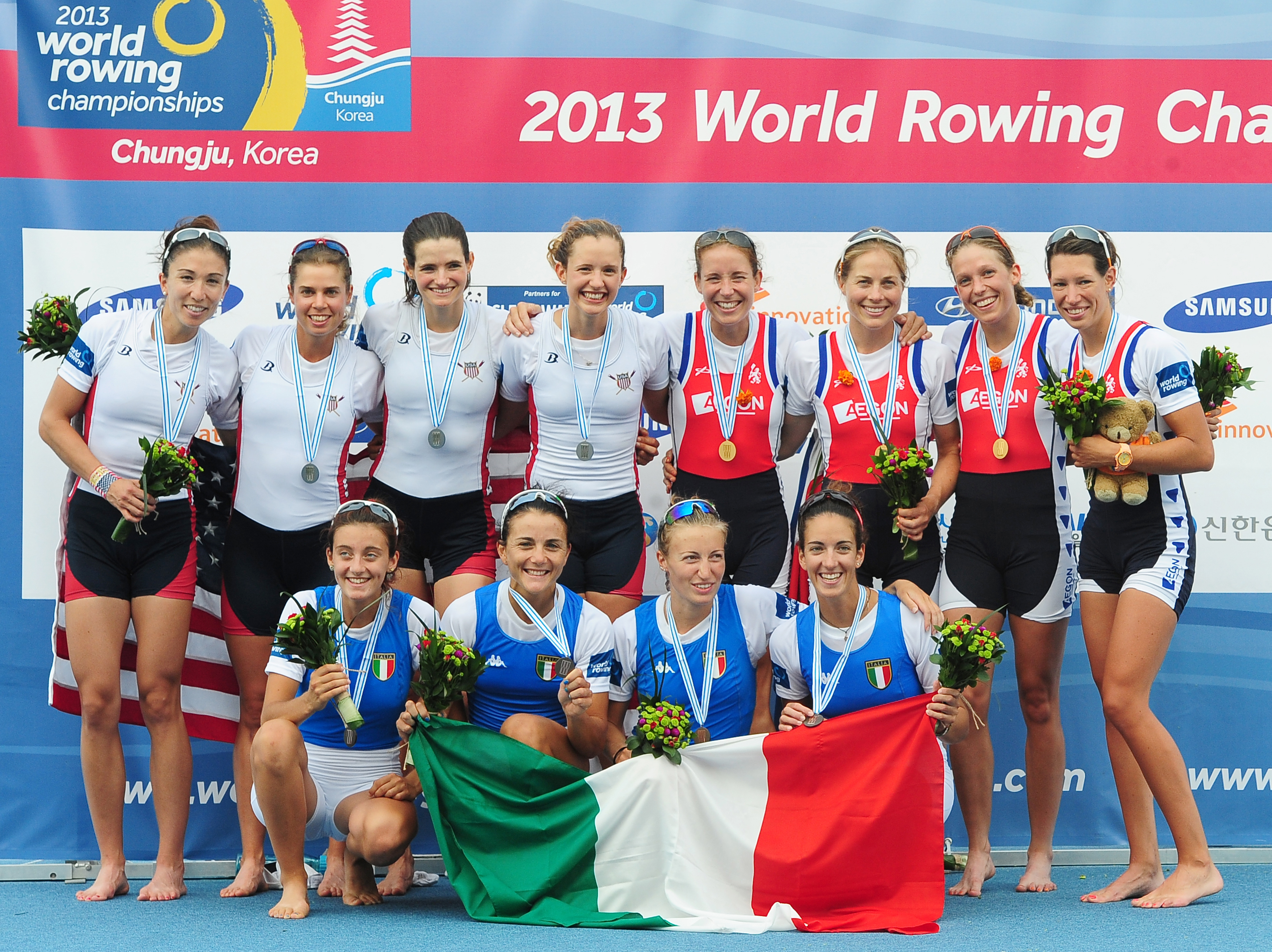
Women's lightweight quads (LW4x) medallists

Event:	Gold:	Time	Silver:	Time	Bronze:	Time
W1x	Australia; Kim Crow	7:31.34	New Zealand; Emma Twigg	7:33.57	Czech Republic; Miroslava Knapková	7:36.88
W2x	Lithuania; Donata Vištartaitė; Milda Valčiukaitė	6:51.82	New Zealand; Fiona Bourke; Zoe Stevenson	6:51.86	Belarus; Ekaterina Karsten; Yuliya Bichyk	6:55.90
W4x	Germany; Annekatrin Thiele; Carina Bär; Julia Richter; Britta Oppelt	6:41.86	Canada; Emily Cameron; Kate Goodfellow; Carling Zeeman; Antje von Seydlitz	6:45.02	Poland; Sylwia Lewandowska; Joanna Leszczyńska; Magdalena Fularczyk; Natalia Madaj	6:46.27
W2-	Great Britain; Helen Glover; Polly Swann	7:22.82	Romania; Roxana Cogianu; Nicoleta Albu	7:25.75	New Zealand; Kayla Pratt; Rebecca Scown	7.27.58
W4-	United States; Emily Huelskamp; Olivia Coffey; Tessa Gobbo; Felice Mueller	6:43.15	Canada; Sarah Black; Christine Roper; Natalie Mastracci; Cristy Nurse	6:47.62	Australia; Hannah Vermeersch; Alexandra Hagan; Charlotte Sutherland; Lucy Stephan	6:49.26
W8+	United States; Amanda Polk; Kerry Simmonds; Emily Regan; Lauren Schmetterling; Grace Luczak; Meghan Musnicki; Victoria Opitz; Caroline Lind; Katelin Snyder	6:02.14	Romania; Cristina Ilie; Ionelia Zaharia; Cristina Grigoraș; Ioana Crăciun; Camelia Lupașcu; Andreea Boghian; Roxana Cogianu; Nicoleta Albu; Daniela Druncea	6:07.04	Canada; Lisa Roman; Jennifer Martins; Carolyn Ganes; Susanne Grainger; Sarah Black; Christine Roper; Natalie Mastracci; Cristy Nurse; Kristen Kit	6:09.34
Women's lightweight events
LW1x	Austria; Michaela Taupe-Traer	7:50.62	Greece; Aikaterini Nikolaidou	7:53.23	Great Britain; Ruth Walczak	7:54.12
LW2x	Italy; Laura Milani; Elisabetta Sancassani	7:17.31	United States; Kristin Hedstrom; Kathleen Bertko	7:20.73	Germany; Lena Müller; Anja Noske	7:22.24
LW4x	Netherlands; Mirte Kraaijkamp; Maaike Head; Rianne Sigmond; Marie-Anne Frenken	6:49.80	United States; Rachel Stortvedt; Hillary Saeger; Helen Tompkins; Nancy Miles	6:54.22	Italy; Greta Masserano; Enrica Marasca; Giulia Pollini; Eleonora Trivella	6:57.06

=== Para-rowing (adaptive) events ===
All boat classes (except LTAMix2x) are also Paralympic.

Event:	Gold:	Time	Silver:	Time	Bronze:	Time
ASW1x	Russia; Natalia Bolshakova	5:13.95	Norway; Birgit Skarstein	5:18.79	Brazil; Cláudia Santos	5:29.82
ASM1x	Australia; Erik Horrie	4:35.98	Ukraine; Igor Bondar	4:42.62	Russia; Alexey Chuvashev	4:44.15
TAMix2x	Australia; Gavin Bellis; Kathryn Ross	3:58.00	France; Perle Bouge; Stéphane Tardieu	3:59.93	Ukraine; Iryna Kyrychenko; Dmytro Ivanov	4:03.34
LTAMix2x	Ukraine; Kateryna Morozova; Dmytro Aleksieiev	3:27.98	Germany; Anke Molkenthin; Marcus Klemp	3:34.48	United States; Paul Hurley; Natalie McCarthy	4:08.59
LTAMix4+	Great Britain; Pam Relph; Naomi Riches; Oliver Hester; James Fox; Oliver James	3:16.12	Italy; Paola Protopapa; Lucilla Aglioti; Tommaso Schettino; Omar Airolo; Giuseppe Di Capua	3:21.70	South Africa; Shannon Murray; Lucy Perold; Dieter Rosslee; Gavin Kilpatrick; Willie Morgan	3:22.90

=== Event codes ===
	Single sculls	Double sculls	Quadruple sculls	Coxless pair	Coxless four	Coxed pair	Coxed four	Eight
Men's	M1x	M2x	M4x	M2-	M4-	M2+		M8+
Lightweight men's	LM1x	LM2x	LM4x	LM2-	LM4-			LM8+
Women's	W1x	W2x	W4x	W2-	W4-			W8+
Lightweight women's	LW1x	LW2x	LW4x					
AS women's	ASW1x							
AS men's	ASM1x							
TA mixed		TAMix2x						
LTA mixed		LTAMix2x					LTAMix4+	

Adaptive rowing categories — AS: arms & shoulders, TA: trunk & arms, LTA: legs, trunk, arms

== Medal table ==
Rank	Nation	Gold	Silver	Bronze	Total
1	Italy	3	2	3	8
2	Australia	3	2	1	6
3	Great Britain	3	0	5	8
4	United States	2	2	4	8
5	Norway	2	1	0	3
6	Netherlands	2	0	1	3
7	Denmark	2	0	0	2
8	Germany	1	5	2	8
9	New Zealand	1	3	1	5
10	Ukraine	1	1	1	3
11	Greece	1	1	0	2
11	Lithuania	1	1	0	2
11	Switzerland	1	1	0	2
14	Czech Republic	1	0	1	2
14	Russia	1	0	1	2
16	Austria	1	0	0	1
16	Croatia	1	0	0	1
18	France	0	3	1	4
19	Canada	0	2	1	3
20	Romania	0	2	0	2
21	Cuba	0	1	0	1
22	Belarus	0	0	1	1
22	Brazil	0	0	1	1
22	Hungary	0	0	1	1
22	Poland	0	0	1	1
22	South Africa	0	0	1	1
Totals (26 entries)		27	27	27	81
