= Ola Larsson =

Swedish footballer (born 1977)

Personal information
- Full name: Ola Daniel Larsson
- Date of birth: 19 September 1977 (age 49)
- Place of birth: Västervik, Sweden
- Height: 1.87 m (6 ft 2 in)
- Position: Centre-back

Youth career
- Bagarmossen Kärrtorp BK
- –1995: IF Brommapojkarna

Senior career*
Years	Team	Apps	(Gls)
1995–1999	IF Brommapojkarna		
2000–2002	Trelleborgs FF	42	(2)

International career
1995	Sweden U18	8	(0)
1997	Sweden U21	1	(0)

Managerial career
- 2003–2010: IF Brommapojkarna (youth coach)
- * Club domestic league appearances and goals

Ola Daniel Larsson (born 19 September 1977) is a Swedish businessman, football coach, teacher and former professional football player. He has previously worked as academy director at IF Brommapojkarna, and as technical director at Hammarby IF and IFK Göteborg.
