= Stefan Wallat =

German rower

Personal information
- Born: 15 February 1987 (age 39)
- Height: 180 cm (5 ft 11 in)
- Weight: 70 kg (154 lb)

Sport
- Sport: Rowing
Medal record
Men's rowing
Representing Germany
World Championships
Gold medal – first place	2014 Amsterdam	Lwt eight
Gold medal – first place	2015 Aiguebelette	Lwt eight
Silver medal – second place	2011 Bled	Lwt quad scull

Stefan Wallat (born 15 February 1987) is a German lightweight rower. He won a gold medal at the 2014 World Rowing Championships in Amsterdam with the lightweight men's eight.
