= Torben Neumann =

German rower

Personal information
- Born: 11 July 1991 (age 34)

Sport
- Sport: Rowing
Medal record
Men's rowing
Representing Germany
World Rowing Championships
Gold medal – first place	2014 Amsterdam	Lwt eight
Gold medal – first place	2015 Aiguebelette	Lwt eight

Torben Neumann (born 11 July 1991) is a German lightweight rower. He won a gold medal at the 2014 World Rowing Championships in Amsterdam with the lightweight men's eight.
