= Vincenzo Serpico =

Italian rower

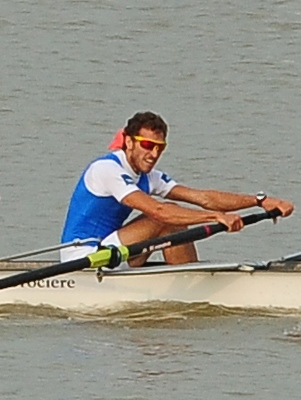

Personal information
- Born: 21 June 1991 (age 35) Castellammare di Stabia, Italy

Sport
- Sport: Rowing
- Club: Fiamme Oro
Medal record
Men's rowing
Representing Italy
World Rowing Championships
Gold medal – first place	2013 Chungju	Lwt eight
Silver medal – second place	2014 Amsterdam	Lwt eight

Vincenzo Serpico (born 21 June 1991) is an Italian lightweight rower. He won a gold medal at the 2013 World Rowing Championships in Chungju with the lightweight men's eight.

== Achievements ==
Year	Competition	Venue	Rank	Event	Time	Teammates
2013	World Championships	(South Korea) Chungju	1st	Lightweight Eight	6:02.27	Catello Amarante, Petru Zaharia, Leone Barbaro, Stefano Oppo; Simone Molteni, Francesco Schisano, Paolo Di Girolamo, Enrico D'Aniello (cox)
