= Timothy McDonnell (rower) =

Australian rower (born 1986)

Personal information
- Born: John McDonnell; 4 February 1986 (age 40)

Sport
- Sport: Rowing
- Club: Toowong Rowing Club

Achievements and titles
- National finals: Penrith Cup 2011,2012,2015.
Medal record
Men's rowing
Representing Australia
World Rowing Championships
Silver medal – second place	2013 Chungju	LM8+

Timothy McDonnell (born 4 February 1986) is an Australian former national representative lightweight rower. He won a silver medal at the 2013 World Rowing Championships.

== Club and state rowing ==
Raised in Queensland, McDonnell's senior club rowing was with the Toowong Rowing Club in Brisbane.

In 2011 McDonnell was first selected in a Queensland lightweight coxless four to contest the Penrith Cup at the Interstate Regatta. He rowed again in the Queensland Penrith Cup four in 2012. After a two year gap he was back in the Queensland lightweight four for their 2015 Penrith Cup victory.

== International representative rowing ==
McDonnell was first selected to represent Australia at the 2012 World Rowing Championships in Plovdiv. He was a reserve for the Australian men's lightweight eight but raced as lightweight single sculler. In that event he finished in overall 22nd place. At the 2013 World Rowing Championships in Chungju. He was in the two seat of the Australian men's lightweight eight when they took the silver medal.

He gained a seat in the Australian lightweight coxless four into 2015 and rowed in that boat at two World Rowing Cups in Europe but when Perry Ward had to make a late withdrawal from the crew due to injury just before the 2015 World Rowing Championships Silcox and Darryn Purcell were reassigned to race in a lightweight coxless pair and McDonnell to again race the lightweight scull. It was a similar outcome to 2012 in that he finished in 23rd place. It was McDonnell's last national representative appearance.
