= Giorgio Tuccinardi =

Italian rower (born 1985)

Medal record

Men's rowing

Representing Italy

World Rowing Championships
Gold medal – first place	2006 Eton	LM8+
Silver medal – second place	2011 Bled	LM8+
Silver medal – second place	2014 Amsterdam	LM8+
Bronze medal – third place	2007 Munich	LM8+

Giorgio Tuccinardi (born 22 December 1985 in Udine) is an Italian rower. He won a gold medal at the 2006 World Rowing Championships.
