= Simone Molteni =

Italian rower

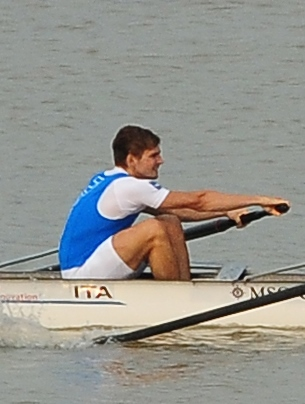

Personal information
- Born: 25 March 1992 (age 34)

Sport
- Sport: Rowing
Medal record
Men's rowing
Representing Italy
World Rowing Championships
Gold medal – first place	2013 Chungju	Lwt eight

Simone Molteni (born 25 March 1992), a.k.a. PetGross, is an Italian lightweight rower who won a gold medal at the 2013 World Rowing Championships in Chungju with the lightweight men's eight.

== Achievements ==
Year	Competition	Venue	Rank	Event	Time	Teammates
2013	World Championships	(South Korea) Chungju	1st	Lightweight Eight	6:02.27	Catello Amarante, Petru Zaharia, Leone Barbaro, Stefano Oppo; Vincenzo Serpico, Francesco Schisano, Paolo Di Girolamo, Enrico D'Aniello (cox)
