= Francesco Schisano =

Italian rower

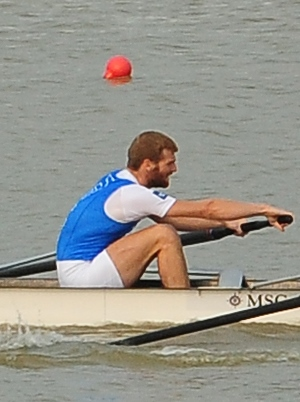

Personal information
- Born: 3 August 1991 (age 34)

Sport
- Sport: Rowing
Medal record
Men's rowing
Representing Italy
World Rowing Championships
Gold medal – first place	2013 Chungju	Lwt eight

Francesco Schisano (born 3 August 1991) is an Italian lightweight rower. He won a gold medal at the 2013 World Rowing Championships in Chungju with the lightweight men's eight.

== Achievements ==
Year	Competition	Venue	Rank	Event	Time	Teammates
2013	World Championships	(South Korea) Chungju	1st	Lightweight Eight	6:02.27	Catello Amarante, Petru Zaharia, Leone Barbaro, Stefano Oppo; Vincenzo Serpico, Simone Molteni, Paolo Di Girolamo, Enrico D'Aniello (cox)
