= Catello Amarante (rower, born 1990) =

Italian rower

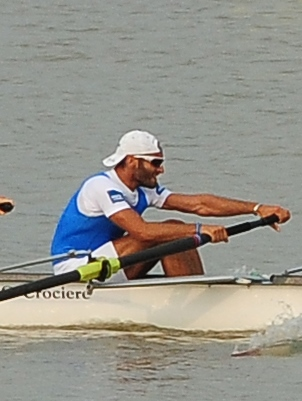

Personal information
- Nationality: Italian
- Born: 1 May 1990 (age 36) Castellammare di Stabia, Italy
- Height: 1.78 m (5 ft 10 in)
- Weight: 72 kg (159 lb)

Sport
- Country: Italy
- Sport: Rowing
- Event: Lightweight quadruple sculls
- Club: Marina Militare Sabaudia
Medal record
Men's rowing
Representing Italy
World Championships
Gold medal – first place	2013 Chungju	Lwt eight
Silver medal – second place	2012 Plovdiv	Lwt eight
Silver medal – second place	2018 Plovdiv	Lwt quad sculls
Silver medal – second place	2019 Ottensheim	Lwt quad sculls
European Championships
Gold medal – first place	2018 Glasgow	Lwt quad sculls
Gold medal – first place	2019 Lucerne	Lwt quad sculls
Gold medal – first place	2020 Poznan	Lwt quad sculls
Silver medal – second place	2017 Račice	Lwt coxless four

Catello Amarante (born 1 May 1990) is an Italian rower, who won the gold medal at the 2013 World Rowing Championships in the men's lightweight eight.

Catello Amarante II is an athlete of the Gruppo Sportivo della Marina Militare.

== Biography ==
He is called Catello Amarante II for better distinguish him from his cousin Catello Amarante I. He won a medal at the 2019 World Rowing Championships.

== Achievements ==
Year	Competition	Venue	Rank	Event	Time	Teammates
2013	World Championships	(South Korea) Chungju	1st	Lightweight Eight	6:02.27	Simone Molteni, Petru Zaharia, Leone Barbaro, Stefano Oppo; Vincenzo Serpico, Francesco Schisano, Paolo Di Girolamo, Enrico D'Aniello (cox)
