= 2014 World Rowing Championships =

International rowing event

- Venue: Bosbaan
- Location: Amsterdam, Netherlands
- Dates: 24 to 31 August
- Competitors: 1168 from 60 nations

The 2014 World Rowing Championships were the 44th edition of the World Rowing Championships and were held from 24 to 31 August 2014 at Bosbaan, Amsterdam in the Netherlands, the second occasion on which the event had been held in Amsterdam, or the Netherlands.

The annual week-long rowing regatta is organised by FISA (the International Rowing Federation and in non-Olympic Games years such as 2014 he regatta is the highlight of the international rowing calendar, where all classes of boats compete.

The 2014 championships were notable for the number of world best times set on days seven & eight of competition. New Zealand rowers Eric Murray and Hamish Bond achieved a rare double in the coxed and coxless pairs.

== Men's events ==
Non-Olympic classes

Event:	Gold:	Time	Silver:	Time	Bronze:	Time
M1x	Czech Republic; Ondřej Synek	6:37.12	New Zealand; Mahé Drysdale	6:37.85	Cuba; Ángel Fournier	6:44.31
M2x	Croatia; Martin Sinković; Valent Sinković	6:00.52	Italy; Romano Battisti; Francesco Fossi	6:04.42	Australia; James McRae; Alexander Belonogoff	6:04.43
M4x	Ukraine; Dmytro Mikhay; Artem Morozov; Oleksandr Nadtoka; Ivan Dovhodko	5:32.26	Great Britain; Graeme Thomas; Sam Townsend; Charles Cousins; Peter Lambert	5:32.35	Germany; Karl Schulze; Tim Grohmann; Kai Fuhrmann; Philipp Wende	5:36.97
M2-	New Zealand; Eric Murray; Hamish Bond	6:09.34	Great Britain; James Foad; Matt Langridge	6:13.75	South Africa; Vincent Breet; Shaun Keeling	6:16.85
M4-	Great Britain; Alex Gregory; Moe Sbihi; George Nash; Andrew Triggs Hodge	5:40.24	United States; Grant James; Michael Gennaro; Henrik Rummel; Seth Weil	5:42.90	Australia; Fergus Pragnell; Josh Dunkley-Smith; Spencer Turrin; Alexander Lloyd	5:43.47
M2+	New Zealand; Eric Murray; Hamish Bond; Caleb Shepherd	6:33.26	Great Britain; Alan Sinclair; Scott Durant; Henry Fieldman	6:43.45	Germany; Peter Kluge; Alexander Egler; Jonas Wiesen	6:45.85
M8+	Great Britain; Nathaniel Reilly-O'Donnell; Matthew Tarrant; Will Satch; Matt Gotrel; Pete Reed; Paul Bennett; Tom Ransley; Constantine Louloudis; Phelan Hill	5:24.11	Germany; Max Planer; Malte Jakschik; Andreas Kuffner; Felix Drahotta; Richard Schmidt; Eric Johannesen; Maximilian Reinelt; Felix Wimberger; Martin Sauer	5:24.77	Poland; Zbigniew Schodowski; Mateusz Wilangowski; Marcin Brzeziński; Robert Fuchs; Krystian Aranowski; Michał Szpakowski; Mikołaj Burda; Piotr Juszczak; Daniel Trojanowski	5:26.90
Men's lightweight events
LM1x	Italy; Marcello Miani	6:43.37	Germany; Lars Hartig	6:46.73	Switzerland; Michael Schmid	6:50.88
LM2x	South Africa; James Thompson; John Smith	6:05.36	France; Stany Delayre; Jérémie Azou	6:05.45	Norway; Kristoffer Brun; Are Strandli	6:05.79
LM4x	Greece; Georgios Konsolas; Spyridon Giannaros; Panagiotis Magdanis; Eleftherios Konsolas	5:42.75	Germany; Daniel Lawitzke; Max Röger; Jost Schömann-Finck; Konstantin Steinhübel	5:45.65	China; Li Hui; Tian Bin; Wang Tiexin; Dong Tianfeng	5:46.69
LM2-	Switzerland; Simon Niepmann; Lucas Tramèr	6:22.91	France; Augustin Mouterde; Thomas Baroukh	6:25.02	Great Britain; Sam Scrimgeour; Jono Clegg	6:25.48
LM4-	Denmark; Kasper Winther Jørgensen; Jacob Larsen; Jacob Barsøe; Morten Jørgensen	5:47.15	New Zealand; James Hunter; Alistair Bond; Peter Taylor; Curtis Rapley	5:48.76	Great Britain; Mark Aldred; Peter Chambers; Richard Chambers; Chris Bartley	5:49.58
LM8+	Germany; Tobias Franzmann; Simon Barr; Torben Neumann; Stefan Wallat; Daniel Wisgott; Jonas Kilthau; Sven Keßler; Can Temel; Frederik Böhm	5:31.29	Italy; Luca De Maria; Vincenzo Serpico; Jiri Vlcek; Leone Barbaro; Livio La Padula; Armando Dell'Aquila; Guido Gravina; Giorgio Tuccinardi; Gianluca Barattolo	5:33.87	Turkey; Mert Kartal; Bayram Sönmez; Ahmet Yumrukaya; Cem Yılmaz; Burak Özdemir; Engin Özkan; Hüseyin Kandemir; Dogsah Boluk; Kaan Şahin	5:34.20

== Women's events ==
Non-Olympic classes

Event:	Gold:	Time	Silver:	Time	Bronze:	Time
W1x	New Zealand; Emma Twigg	7:14.95	Australia; Kim Crow	7:17.33	China; Duan Jingli	7:22.57
W2x	New Zealand; Fiona Bourke; Zoe Stevenson	6:38.04	Poland; Magdalena Fularczyk; Natalia Madaj	6:39.36	Australia; Olympia Aldersey; Sally Kehoe	6:41.71
W4x	Germany; Annekatrin Thiele; Carina Bär; Julia Lier; Lisa Schmidla	6:06.84	China; Jiang Yan; Shen Xiaoxing; Lü Yang; Zhang Xinyue	6:10.51	United States; Grace Latz; Tracy Eisser; Olivia Coffey; Felice Mueller	6:12.03
W2-	Great Britain; Helen Glover; Heather Stanning	6:50.61	United States; Megan Kalmoe; Kerry Simmonds	6:52.87	New Zealand; Louise Trappitt; Rebecca Scown	6:54.79
W4-	New Zealand; Kayla Pratt; Kelsey Bevan; Grace Prendergast; Kerri Gowler	6:14.36	United States; Susan Francia; Emily Regan; Tessa Gobbo; Adrienne Martelli	6:20.69	China; He Sihui; Miao Tian; Zhang Min; Zhang Huan	6:23.31
W8+	United States; Victoria Opitz; Meghan Musnicki; Amanda Polk; Lauren Schmetterling; Grace Luczak; Caroline Lind; Elle Logan; Heidi Robbins; Katelin Snyder	5:56.83	Canada; Cristy Nurse; Lisa Roman; Rosanne Deboef; Natalie Mastracci; Susanne Grainger; Christine Roper; Ashley Brzozowicz; Lauren Wilkinson; Lesley Thompson-Willie	5:59.66	China; Zhang Dan; Guo Linlin; Yi Liqin; Gao Qiuqiu; Cui Xiaotong; Ju Rui; Zhang Min; Zhang Huan; Zhao Li	6:00.52
Women's lightweight events
LW1x	Belgium; Eveline Peleman	7:31.31	Greece; Aikaterini Nikolaidou	7:31.73	United States; Kathleen Bertko	7:33.97
LW2x	New Zealand; Sophie MacKenzie; Julia Edward	6:48.56	Canada; Lindsay Jennerich; Patricia Obee	6:50.41	China; Huang Wenyi; Pan Dandan	6:53.40
LW4x	Netherlands; Mirte Kraaijkamp; Elisabeth Woerner; Maaike Head; Ilse Paulis	6:15.95	Australia; Laura Dunn; Sarah Pound; Maia Simmonds; Hannah Every-Hall	6:19.54	Germany; Katrin Thoma; Judith Anlauf; Wiebke Hein; Leonie Pieper	6:22.79

== Para-rowing (adaptive) events ==
All boat classes (except LTAMix2x) are also Paralympic.

Event:	Gold:	Time	Silver:	Time	Bronze:	Time
ASW1x	Norway; Birgit Skarstein	5:22.12	Israel; Moran Samuel	5:33.86	Belarus; Liudmila Vauchok	5:39.10
ASM1x	Australia; Erik Horrie	4:50.68	Great Britain; Tom Aggar	4:53.41	Russia; Alexey Chuvashev	4:58.96
TAMix2x	Australia; Gavin Bellis; Kathryn Ross	4:02.55	France; Perle Bouge; Stéphane Tardieu	4:05.11	Brazil; Josiane Lima; Michel Gomes Pessanha	4:07.54
LTAMix2x	Ukraine; Kateryna Morozova; Dmytro Aleksieiev	3:28.39	Australia; Jeremy McGrath; Kathleen Murdoch	3:35.26	France; Guylaine Marchand; Antoine Jesel	3:36.47
LTAMix4+	Great Britain; Grace Clough; Pam Relph; Daniel Brown; James Fox; Oliver James	3:20.45	United States; Jaclyn Smith; Richard Vandegrift; Zachary Burns; Danielle Hansen; Jennifer Sichel	3:25.49	Italy; Lucilla Aglioti; Valentina Grassi; Tommaso Schettino; Omar Airolo; Giuseppe Di Capua	3:30.39

== Event codes ==
	Single sculls	Double sculls	Quadruple sculls	Coxless pair	Coxless four	Coxed pair	Coxed four	Eight
Men's	M1x	M2x	M4x	M2-	M4-	M2+		M8+
Lightweight men's	LM1x	LM2x	LM4x	LM2-	LM4-			LM8+
Women's	W1x	W2x	W4x	W2-	W4-			W8+
Lightweight women's	LW1x	LW2x	LW4x					
AS women's	ASW1x							
AS men's	ASM1x							
TA mixed		TAMix2x						
LTA mixed		LTAMix2x					LTAMix4+	

Adaptive rowing categories — AS: arms & shoulders, TA: trunk & arms, LTA: legs, trunk, arms

== Medal table ==
Rank	Nation	Gold	Silver	Bronze	Total
1	New Zealand	6	2	1	9
2	Great Britain	4	4	2	10
3	Australia	2	3	3	8
3	Germany	2	3	3	8
5	Ukraine	2	0	0	2
6	United States	1	4	2	7
7	Italy	1	2	1	4
8	Greece	1	1	0	2
9	Norway	1	0	1	2
9	South Africa	1	0	1	2
9	Switzerland	1	0	1	2
12	Belgium	1	0	0	1
12	Croatia	1	0	0	1
12	Czech Republic	1	0	0	1
12	Denmark	1	0	0	1
12	Netherlands	1	0	0	1
17	France	0	3	1	4
18	Canada	0	2	0	2
19	China	0	1	5	6
20	Poland	0	1	1	2
21	Israel	0	1	0	1
22	Belarus	0	0	1	1
22	Brazil	0	0	1	1
22	Cuba	0	0	1	1
22	Russia	0	0	1	1
22	Turkey	0	0	1	1
Totals (26 entries)		27	27	27	81

== World records ==
The championships were notable for the number of world best times set on days seven & eight of competition (30 & 31 August) with fourteen long standing world marks set in addition to a number of world best times beaten then bettered during the regatta. Tail winds and fast water affected the conditions on the Bosbaan but the new marks were allowed to stand by FISA. The records included the sixteen fastest ever times rowed at World Championships, with fourteen of those also being the world's best time. As of 2021 eleven of those marks still stand as the world's best times.

Boat	Time	Crew	Nation	Day /Event	Record	Standing	Ref
M2- Coxless pairs	6:09:34	Hamish Bond; Eric Murray	New Zealand	Final; 30 Aug 2014	Best time at a World Championship	Standing in 2021	
W2- Coxless pairs	6:50.61	Helen Glover; Heather Stanning	(United Kingdom) Great Britain	Final; 30 Aug 2014	World's Best Time	Beaten in 2017	
LM4x; Lightweight quad sculls	5:42.75	Georgios Konsolas; Spyridon Giannaros; Panagiotis Magdanis; Eleftherios Konsolas	Greece	Semi Final; 30 Aug 2014	World's Best Time	Standing in 2021	
LW4x; Lightweight single sculls	6:43.37	Marcello Miani	Italy	Final; 30 Aug 2014	World's Best Time	Beaten in 2018	
LW4x; Lightweight quadruple sculls	6:15.95	Mirte Kraaijkamp; Elisabeth Woerner; Maaike Head; Ilse Paulis	Netherlands	Final; 30 Aug 2014	World's Best Time	Standing in 2021	
LM2- Lightweight coxless pairs	6:22.91	Simon Niepmann; Lucas Tramèr	Switzerland	Final; 30 Aug 2014	World's Best Time	Standing in 2021	
M2+ Coxed pairs	6:33.26	Hamish Bond; Eric Murray; Caleb Shepherd (cox)	New Zealand	Final; 30 Aug 2014	World's Best Time	Standing in 2021	
W4- Coxless four	6:14.36	Grace Prendergast; Kayla Pratt; Kerri Gowler; Kelsey Bevan	New Zealand	Final; 30 Aug 2014	World's Best Time	Standing in 2021	
LM4- Lightweight coxless four	5:43.16	Kasper Winther Jørgensen; Jacob Larsen; Jacob Barsøe; Morten Jørgensen	Denmark	Semi-final; 30 Aug 2014	World's Best Time	Standing in 2021	
W2x; Double sculls	6:37.31	Olympia Aldersey; Sally Kehoe	Australia	Semi-final; 30 Aug 2014	World's Best Time	Standing in 2021	
M2x; Double sculls	5:59.72	Martin Sinković; Valent Sinković	Croatia	Semi-final; 30 Aug 2014	World's Best Time	Standing in 2021	
M4x; Quad sculls	5:32.26	Artem Morozov; Oleksandr Nadtoka; Dmytro Mikhay; Ivan Dovhodko	Ukraine	Semi-final; 31 Aug 2014	World's Best Time	Standing in 2021	
LW2x; Lightweight double sculls	6:43.79	Sophie MacKenzie; Julia Edward	New Zealand	Final; 31 Aug 2014	World's Best Time	Beaten in 2016	
W4x; Quad sculls	6:06.84	Carina Bär; Julia Lier; Annekatrin Thiele; Lisa Schmidla	Germany	Final; 31 Aug 2014	World's Best Time	Standing in 2021	
M4- Coxless four	5:40.24	Andrew Triggs Hodge; Alex Gregory; George Nash; Moe Sbihi	(United Kingdom) Great Britain	Final; 31Aug 2014	Best time at a World Championship	Standing in 2021	
LM2x; Lightweight double sculls	6:05.36	John Smith; James Thompson	South Africa	Final; 31Aug 2014	World's Best Time	Standing in 2021	
