= Josh Booth =

Josh or Joshua Booth may refer to:

- Joshua Booth (c. 1758 – 1813), soldier and political figure in Upper Canada
- Josh Booth (rower) (Joshua Booth, born 1990), Australian rower
- Josh Booth (politician) (Joshua Booth, born 1979), American politician
