= 2023 World Rowing Championships – Men's single sculls =

Men's single sculls at the 2023 World Rowing Championships
- Venue: Lake Sava
- Location: Belgrade, Serbia
- Dates: 3 September – 10 September
- Competitors: 47 from 47 nations
- Winning time: 6:38.08

Medalists
gold medal	Oliver Zeidler	Germany
silver medal	Simon van Dorp	Netherlands
bronze medal	Thomas Mackintosh	New Zealand

The men's single sculls competition at the 2023 World Rowing Championships took place at Lake Sava, in Belgrade.

== Schedule ==
The schedule was as follows:

Date	Time	Round
Sunday 3 September 2023	09:30	Heats
Monday 4 September 2023	15:30	Repechages
Tuesday 5 September 2023	12:58	Quarterfinals EH
Wednesday 6 September 2023	11:26	Quarterfinals AD
Wednesday 6 September 2023	15:30	Semifinals G/H
Wednesday 6 September 2023	15:44	Semifinals E/F
Thursday 7 September 2023	15:45	Semifinals C/D
Thursday 7 September 2023	17:15	Final H
Thursday 7 September 2023	17:20	Final G
Thursday 7 September 2023	17:25	Final F
Thursday 7 September 2023	17:35	Final E
Friday 8 September 2023	09:55	Semifinals A/B
Sunday 10 September 2023	09:40	Final D
Sunday 10 September 2023	10:18	Final C
Sunday 10 September 2023	11:16	Final B
Sunday 10 September 2023	14:25	Final A

All times are Central European Summer Time (UTC+2)

== Results ==
=== Heats ===
The two fastest boats in each heat advanced directly to the AD quarterfinals. The remaining boats were sent to the repechages.

==== Heat 1 ====
Rank	Rower	Country	Time	Notes
1	Stefanos Ntouskos	Greece	6:45.46	QAD
2	Davide Mumolo	Italy	6:50.09	QAD
3	Gonzalo García Ferrero	Spain	6:52.04	R
4	André Pinto	Portugal	7:00.38	R
5	Zurab Kintiraia	Georgia	7:32.48	R
6	Emerson Costino	Angola	8:06.74	R

==== Heat 2 ====
Rank	Rower	Country	Time	Notes
1	Kristian Vasilev	Bulgaria	6:49.18	QAD
2	Lucas Verthein	Brazil	6:50.67	QAD
3	Alexandros Zisimidis	Cyprus	6:56.35	R
4	Dani Fridman	Israel	7:02.03	R
5	Zhang Hanwen	China	7:03.26	R
6	Kyle Spenard	Barbados	8:34.58	R

==== Heat 3 ====
Rank	Rower	Country	Time	Notes
1	Oliver Zeidler	Germany	6:44.10	QAD
2	Trevor Jones	Canada	6:46.07	QAD
3	Kjetil Borch	Norway	6:46.19	R
4	Cevdet Ege Mutlu	Turkey	6:56.80	R
5	Mohamed Taieb	Tunisia	7:01.38	R
6	Abdalla Ahmed	Sudan	7:42.99	R

==== Heat 4 ====
Rank	Rower	Country	Time	Notes
1	Ryuta Arakawa	Japan	6:48.19	QAD
2	Nikolaj Pimenov	Serbia	6:51.32	QAD
3	Bruno Cetraro	Uruguay	7:00.12	R
4	Bakr Al-Dulaimi	Iraq	7:01.67	R
5	Dara Alizadeh	Bermuda	7:07.52	R
6	Abdelkhalek El-Banna	Egypt	7:09.77	R

==== Heat 5 ====
Rank	Rower	Country	Time	Notes
1	Yauheni Zalaty	Individual Neutral Athletes	6:44.61	QAD
2	Tim Brys	Belgium	6:48.41	QAD
3	Alexander Rossi	Australia	6:56.74	R
4	Aleksandr Vyazovkin	Individual Neutral Athletes	7:01.79	R
5	Stephen Cox	Zimbabwe	7:10.50	R
6	Riccardo Bouehi	Ivory Coast	7:15.80	R

==== Heat 6 ====
Rank	Rower	Country	Time	Notes
1	Simon van Dorp	Netherlands	6:40.82	QAD
2	Thomas Mackintosh	New Zealand	6:41.58	QAD
3	Eliot Putnam	United States	6:51.68	R
4	Bendegúz Pétervári-Molnár	Hungary	7:00.79	R
5	Bahman Nasiri	Azerbaijan	7:02.01	R
6	Mohamed Bukrah	Libya	7:46.19	R

==== Heat 7 ====
Rank	Rower	Country	Time	Notes
1	Sverri Nielsen	Denmark	6:52.45	QAD
2	Eskil Borgh	Sweden	6:53.77	QAD
3	Joel Naukkarinen	Finland	6:55.26	R
4	Javier Insfran	Paraguay	7:23.73	R
5	Roberto López	El Salvador	7:28.39	R
6	Juan Flores	Mexico	7:35.61	R

==== Heat 8 ====
Rank	Rower	Country	Time	Notes
1	Dovydas Nemeravičius	Lithuania	6:47.07	QAD
2	Damir Martin	Croatia	6:51.94	QAD
3	Quentin Antognelli	Monaco	6:59.30	R
4	Filip-Matej Pfeifer	Slovenia	7:34.52	R
5	Privel Hinkati	Benin	7:43.00	R

=== Repechages ===
The fastest boat in each repechage advanced to the AD quarterfinals. The remaining boats were sent to the EF quarterfinals.

==== Repechage 1 ====
Rank	Rower	Country	Time	Notes
1	Bruno Cetraro	Uruguay	7:20.31	QAD
2	Cevdet Ege Mutlu	Turkey	7:20.52	QEH
3	Zhang Hanwen	China	7:41.62	QEH
4	Emerson Costino	Angola	8:49.99	QEH

==== Repechage 2 ====
Rank	Rower	Country	Time	Notes
1	Alexander Rossi	Australia	7:32.71	QAD
2	Mohamed Taieb	Tunisia	7:39.40	QEH
3	Bakr Al-Dulaimi	Iraq	7:47.63	QEH
4	Kyle Spenard	Barbados	9:02.62	QEH

==== Repechage 3 ====
Rank	Rower	Country	Time	Notes
1	Eliot Putnam	United States	7:26.21	QAD
2	Aleksandr Vyazovkin	Individual Neutral Athletes	7:34.84	QEH
3	Dara Alizadeh	Bermuda	7:54.65	QEH
4	Abdalla Ahmed	Sudan	8:17.80	QEH

==== Repechage 4 ====
Rank	Rower	Country	Time	Notes
1	Bendegúz Pétervári-Molnár	Hungary	7:30.63	QAD
2	Joel Naukkarinen	Finland	7:36.10	QEH
3	Stephen Cox	Zimbabwe	7:39.20	QEH
4	Abdelkhalek El-Banna	Egypt	7:49.46	QEH

==== Repechage 5 ====
Rank	Rower	Country	Time	Notes
1	Quentin Antognelli	Monaco	7:22.51	QAD
2	Bahman Nasiri	Azerbaijan	7:27.09	QEH
3	Javier Insfran	Paraguay	7:32.64	QEH
4	Riccardo Bouehi	Ivory Coast	8:02.35	QEH

==== Repechage 6 ====
Rank	Rower	Country	Time	Notes
1	Gonzalo García Ferrero	Spain	7:37.93	QAD
2	Filip-Matej Pfeifer	Slovenia	7:58.09	QEH
3	Mohamed Bukrah	Libya	8:15.75	QEH
4	Roberto López	El Salvador	8:15.87	QEH

==== Repechage 7 ====
Rank	Rower	Country	Time	Notes
1	André Pinto	Portugal	7:31.25	QAD
2	Alexandros Zisimidis	Cyprus	7:52.30	QEH
3	Juan Flores	Mexico	7:54.81	QEH
4	Privel Hinkati	Benin	8:22.73	QEH

==== Repechage 8 ====
Rank	Rower	Country	Time	Notes
1	Kjetil Borch	Norway	7:27.25	QAD
2	Dani Fridman	Israel	7:31.32	QEH
3	Zurab Kintiraia	Georgia	8:07.14	QEH

=== Quarterfinals EH ===
The three fastest boats in each heat advanced to the EF semifinals. The remaining boats were sent to the GH semifinals.

==== Quarterfinal 1 ====
Rank	Rower	Country	Time	Notes
1	Aleksandr Vyazovkin	Individual Neutral Athletes	7:16.13	SE/F
2	Mohamed Taieb	Tunisia	7:20.15	SE/F
3	Stephen Cox	Zimbabwe	7:29.70	SE/F
4	Riccardo Bouehi	Ivory Coast	7:34.86	SG/H
5	Mohamed Bukrah	Libya	7:54.84	SG/H
6	Emerson Costino	Angola	8:24.54	SG/H

==== Quarterfinal 2 ====
Rank	Rower	Country	Time	Notes
1	Bahman Nasiri	Azerbaijan	7:23.54	SE/F
2	Juan Flores	Mexico	7:29.46	SE/F
3	Joel Naukkarinen	Finland	7:44.15	SE/F
4	Roberto López	El Salvador	7:47.87	SG/H
5	Zurab Kintiraia	Georgia	7:57.50	SG/H
6	Kyle Spenard	Barbados	8:38.61	SG/H

==== Quarterfinal 3 ====
Rank	Rower	Country	Time	Notes
1	Filip-Matej Pfeifer	Slovenia	7:22.34	SE/F
2	Dani Fridman	Israel	7:30.46	SE/F
3	Zhang Hanwen	China	7:33.01	SE/F
4	Abdalla Ahmed	Sudan	8:05.14	SG/H
5	Privel Hinkati	Benin	8:09.10	SG/H
	Bakr Al-Dulaimi	Iraq	DNS	

==== Quarterfinal 4 ====
Rank	Rower	Country	Time	Notes
1	Cevdet Ege Mutlu	Turkey	7:14.11	SE/F
2	Alexandros Zisimidis	Cyprus	7:17.04	SE/F
3	Abdelkhalek El-Banna	Egypt	7:19.64	SE/F
4	Dara Alizadeh	Bermuda	7:24.50	SG/H
5	Javier Insfran	Paraguay	7:33.28	SG/H

=== Quarterfinals AD ===
The three fastest boats in each Quarterfinal advanced to the AB semifinals. The remaining boats were sent to the CD semifinals.

==== Quarterfinal 1 ====
Rank	Rower	Country	Time	Notes
1	Stefanos Ntouskos	Greece	7:08.00	SA/B
2	Nikolaj Pimenov	Serbia	7:11.81	SA/B
3	Kristian Vasilev	Bulgaria	7:14.57	SA/B
4	Trevor Jones	Canada	7:15.98	SC/D
5	Quentin Antognelli	Monaco	7:36.65	SC/D
6	Gonzalo García Ferrero	Spain	7:51.02	SC/D

==== Quarterfinal 2 ====
Rank	Rower	Country	Time	Notes
1	Oliver Zeidler	Germany	7:06.01	SA/B
2	Thomas Mackintosh	New Zealand	7:08.33	SA/B
3	Ryuta Arakawa	Japan	7:11.65	SA/B
4	Tim Brys	Belgium	7:12.41	SC/D
5	Kjetil Borch	Norway	7:17.81	SC/D
6	Bruno Cetraro	Uruguay	7:52.54	SC/D

==== Quarterfinal 3 ====
Rank	Rower	Country	Time	Notes
1	Simon van Dorp	Netherlands	7:05.97	SA/B
2	Yauheni Zalaty	Individual Neutral Athletes	7:06.90	SA/B
3	Damir Martin	Croatia	7:12.33	SA/B
4	Eliot Putnam	United States	7:20.55	SC/D
5	Alexander Rossi	Australia	7:30.90	SC/D
6	Eskil Borgh	Sweden	7:39.11	SC/D

==== Quarterfinal 4 ====
Rank	Rower	Country	Time	Notes
1	Sverri Nielsen	Denmark	7:16.59	SA/B
2	Dovydas Nemeravičius	Lithuania	7:18.26	SA/B
3	Davide Mumolo	Italy	7:19.78	SA/B
4	Lucas Verthein	Brazil	7:29.22	SC/D
5	André Pinto	Portugal	7:45.28	SC/D
6	Bendegúz Pétervári-Molnár	Hungary	7:58.40	SC/D

=== Semifinals G/H ===
The three fastest boats in each Semifinal advanced directly to the Final G. The remaining boats were sent to the Final H.

==== Semifinal 1 ====
Rank	Rower	Country	Time	Notes
1	Javier Insfran	Paraguay	8:09.10	FG
2	Riccardo Bouehi	Ivory Coast	8:12.65	FG
3	Zurab Kintiraia	Georgia	8:41.90	FG
4	Abdalla Ahmed	Sudan	8:49.03	FH
5	Emerson Costino	Angola	9:44.05	FH

==== Semifinal 2 ====
Rank	Rower	Country	Time	Notes
1	Dara Alizadeh	Bermuda	8:19.06	FG
2	Roberto López	El Salvador	8:24.14	FG
3	Mohamed Bukrah	Libya	8:30.24	FG
4	Privel Hinkati	Benin	8:38.76	FH
5	Kyle Spenard	Barbados	9:30.48	FH

=== Semifinals E/F ===
The three fastest boats in each Semifinal advanced to the Final E. The remaining boats were sent to the Final F.

==== Semifinal 1 ====
Rank	Rower	Country	Time	Notes
1	Aleksandr Vyazovkin	Individual Neutral Athletes	7:46.27	FE
2	Alexandros Zisimidis	Cyprus	7:50.12	FE
3	Juan Flores	Mexico	7:55.59	FE
4	Abdelkhalek El-Banna	Egypt	8:03.69	FF
5	Stephen Cox	Zimbabwe	8:09.77	FF
6	Filip-Matej Pfeifer	Slovenia	8:28.25	FF

==== Semifinal 2 ====
Rank	Rower	Country	Time	Notes
1	Bahman Nasiri	Azerbaijan	7:48.34	FE
2	Cevdet Ege Mutlu	Turkey	7:48.85	FE
3	Dani Fridman	Israel	7:51.33	FE
4	Mohamed Taieb	Tunisia	7:56.13	FF
5	Joel Naukkarinen	Finland	8:15.50	FF
6	Zhang Hanwen	China	8:31.94	FF

=== Semifinals C/D ===
The fastest boat in each Semifinal advanced to the Final C. The remaining boats were sent to the Final D.

==== Semifinal 1 ====
Rank	Rower	Country	Time	Notes
1	Tim Brys	Belgium	7:39.65	FC
2	André Pinto	Portugal	7:43.04	FC
3	Alexander Rossi	Australia	7:44.43	FC
4	Gonzalo García Ferrero	Spain	7:55.91	FD
5	Eskil Borgh	Sweden	8:02.10	FD
6	Trevor Jones	Canada	8:12.79	FD

==== Semifinal 2 ====
Rank	Rower	Country	Time	Notes
1	Lucas Verthein	Brazil	7:34.68	FC
2	Quentin Antognelli	Monaco	7:36.82	FC
3	Bendegúz Pétervári-Molnár	Hungary	7:38.69	FC
4	Bruno Cetraro	Uruguay	7:39.08	FD
5	Eliot Putnam	United States	7:54.63	FD
	Kjetil Borch	Norway	DNS	

=== Semifinals A/B ===
The three fastest boats in each Semifinal advanced to the Final A. The remaining boats were sent to the Final B.

==== Semifinal 1 ====
Rank	Rower	Country	Time	Notes
1	Oliver Zeidler	Germany	6:53.47	FA
2	Stefanos Ntouskos	Greece	6:55.71	FA
3	Damir Martin	Croatia	6:58.67	FA
4	Yauheni Zalaty	Individual Neutral Athletes	7:00.14	FB
5	Kristian Vasilev	Bulgaria	7:09.15	FB
6	Dovydas Nemeravičius	Lithuania	7:09.47	FB

==== Semifinal 2 ====
Rank	Rower	Country	Time	Notes
1	Simon van Dorp	Netherlands	6:55.46	FA
2	Sverri Nielsen	Denmark	6:57.30	FA
3	Thomas Mackintosh	New Zealand	6:58.12	FA
4	Nikolaj Pimenov	Serbia	7:03.52	FB
5	Ryuta Arakawa	Japan	7:09.91	FB
6	Davide Mumolo	Italy	7:14.96	FB

=== Finals ===
The A final determined the rankings for places 1 to 6. Additional rankings were determined in the other finals.

==== Final H ====
Rank	Rower	Country	Time	Total rank
1	Privel Hinkati	Benin	8:01.84	42
2	Abdalla Ahmed	Sudan	8:09.66	43
3	Kyle Spenard	Barbados	8:40.69	44
4	Emerson Costino	Angola	8:43.34	45

==== Final G ====
Rank	Rower	Country	Time	Total rank
1	Javier Insfran	Paraguay	7:30.46	36
2	Dara Alizadeh	Bermuda	7:33.46	37
3	Riccardo Bouehi	Ivory Coast	7:37.38	38
4	Zurab Kintiraia	Georgia	7:54.94	39
5	Mohamed Bukrah	Libya	8:00.52	40
6	Roberto López	El Salvador	8:02.61	41

==== Final F ====
Rank	Rower	Country	Time	Total rank
1	Mohamed Taieb	Tunisia	7:20.04	30
2	Filip-Matej Pfeifer	Slovenia	7:24.56	31
3	Abdelkhalek El-Banna	Egypt	7:24.66	32
4	Joel Naukkarinen	Finland	7:31.85	33
5	Stephen Cox	Zimbabwe	7:36.11	34
6	Zhang Hanwen	China	7:51.49	35

==== Final E ====
Rank	Rower	Country	Time	Total rank
1	Aleksandr Vyazovkin	Individual Neutral Athletes	7:10.61	24
2	Bahman Nasiri	Azerbaijan	7:13.57	25
3	Cevdet Ege Mutlu	Turkey	7:16.11	26
4	Alexandros Zisimidis	Cyprus	7:16.25	27
5	Juan Flores	Mexico	7:30.86	28
6	Dani Fridman	Israel	7:33.77	29

==== Final D ====
Rank	Rower	Country	Time	Total rank
1	Eliot Putnam	United States	6:53.53	19
2	Bruno Cetraro	Uruguay	6:57.23	20
3	Gonzalo García Ferrero	Spain	6:58.24	21
4	Eskil Borgh	Sweden	7:13.10	22
	Trevor Jones	Canada	DNS	23

==== Final C ====
Rank	Rower	Country	Time	Total rank
1	Tim Brys	Belgium	6:50.08	13
2	Lucas Verthein	Brazil	6:53.08	14
3	Alexander Rossi	Australia	6:55.03	15
4	Quentin Antognelli	Monaco	6:56.94	16
5	André Pinto	Portugal	7:03.39	17
6	Bendegúz Pétervári-Molnár	Hungary	7:13.15	18

==== Final B ====
Rank	Rower	Country	Time	Total rank
1	Yauheni Zalaty	Individual Neutral Athletes	6:51.29	7
2	Ryuta Arakawa	Japan	6:52.19	8
3	Dovydas Nemeravičius	Lithuania	6:52.61	9
4	Kristian Vasilev	Bulgaria	6:53.72	10
5	Davide Mumolo	Italy	6:58.70	11
6	Nikolaj Pimenov	Serbia	7:12.33	12

==== Final A ====
Rank	Rower	Country	Time
1st place, gold medalist(s)	Oliver Zeidler	Germany	6:38.08
2nd place, silver medalist(s)	Simon van Dorp	Netherlands	6:39.26
3rd place, bronze medalist(s)	Thomas Mackintosh	New Zealand	6:40.33
4	Stefanos Ntouskos	Greece	6:40.56
5	Sverri Nielsen	Denmark	6:48.19
6	Damir Martin	Croatia	7:06.39
