= 2019 World Rowing Championships – Men's single sculls =

Men's single sculls at the 2019 World Rowing Championships
- Venue: Linz-Ottensheim
- Location: Ottensheim, Austria
- Dates: 25 August – 1 September
- Competitors: 44 from 44 nations
- Winning time: 6:44.55

Medalists
gold medal	Oliver Zeidler	Germany
silver medal	Sverri Sandberg Nielsen	Denmark
bronze medal	Kjetil Borch	Norway

The men's single sculls competition at the 2019 World Rowing Championships took place at the Linz-Ottensheim regatta venue. A top-nine finish ensured qualification for the Tokyo Olympics.

== Schedule ==
The schedule was as follows:

Date	Time	Round
Sunday 25 August 2019	16:57	Heats
Monday 26 August 2019	15:40	Repechages
Wednesday 28 August 2019	13:17	Quarterfinals AD
Wednesday 28 August 2019	16:04	Quarterfinals EH
Thursday 29 August 2019	15:20	Semifinals G/H
Thursday 29 August 2019	15:40	Semifinals E/F
Thursday 29 August 2019	16:10	Semifinals C/D
Friday 30 August 2019	12:20	Semifinals A/B
Saturday 31 August 2019	09:18	Final H
Saturday 31 August 2019	09:23	Final G
Saturday 31 August 2019	09:28	Final F
Saturday 31 August 2019	09:33	Final E
Sunday 1 September 2019	10:30	Final D
Sunday 1 September 2019	11:06	Final C
Sunday 1 September 2019	12:30	Final B
Sunday 1 September 2019	14:46	Final A

All times are Central European Summer Time (UTC+2)

== Results ==
=== Heats ===
The two fastest boats in each heat advanced directly to the AD quarterfinals. The remaining boats were sent to the repechages.

==== Heat 1 ====
Rank	Rower	Country	Time	Notes
1	Stefanos Douskos	Greece	7:05.55	QAD
2	Tom Barras	Great Britain	7:08.69	QAD
3	Thibaut Verhoeven	France	7:12.85	R
4	Ángel Fournier	Cuba	7:19.78	R
5	Prem Nampratueng	Thailand	7:38.24	R
6	Javier Insfrán	Paraguay	7:52.20	R

==== Heat 2 ====
Rank	Rower	Country	Time	Notes
1	Stef Broenink	Netherlands	7:02.43	QAD
2	Simone Martini	Italy	7:06.75	QAD
3	Kristian Vasilev	Bulgaria	7:15.15	R
4	Lukas Reim	Austria	7:17.40	R
5	Kevin Meador	United States	7:31.46	R
6	Jordi Jofre	Spain	7:38.11	R

==== Heat 3 ====
Rank	Rower	Country	Time	Notes
1	Kjetil Borch	Norway	6:59.25	QAD
2	Nico Stahlberg	Switzerland	7:03.24	QAD
3	Juan Carlos Cabrera	Mexico	7:18.58	R
4	Vladislav Yakovlev	Kazakhstan	7:20.80	R
5	Rohit Kumar	India	7:23.90	R
6	Dara Alizadeh	Bermuda	7:36.65	R

==== Heat 4 ====
Rank	Rower	Country	Time	Notes
1	Aleksandar Filipović	Serbia	7:04.15	QAD
2	Pilip Pavukou	Belarus	7:06.97	QAD
3	Robert Ven	Finland	7:08.90	R
4	Mihai Chiruţă	Romania	7:09.20	R
5	Kim Dong-yong	South Korea	7:23.61	R
6	Privel Hinkati	Benin	7:48.32	R

==== Heat 5 ====
Rank	Rower	Country	Time	Notes
1	Oliver Zeidler	Germany	7:02.66	QAD
2	Robbie Manson	New Zealand	7:13.51	QAD
3	Shakhboz Kholmurzaev	Uzbekistan	7:20.64	R
4	Quentin Antognelli	Monaco	7:34.23	R
5	Andrei Jämsä	Estonia	7:44.53	R

==== Heat 6 ====
Rank	Rower	Country	Time	Notes
1	Natan Węgrzycki-Szymczyk	Poland	7:05.79	QAD
2	Damir Martin	Croatia	7:11.05	QAD
3	Onat Kazakli	Turkey	7:13.40	R
4	Dani Fridman	Israel	7:21.65	R
5	Aleksandar Aleksandrov	Azerbaijan	7:24.36	R

==== Heat 7 ====
Rank	Rower	Country	Time	Notes
1	Sverri Sandberg Nielsen	Denmark	7:04.68	QAD
2	Anders Backeus	Sweden	7:14.13	QAD
3	Lukáš Babač	Slovakia	7:40.38	R
4	Rio Rii	Vanuatu	7:57.32	R
5	Ahmad Al Hammadi	United Arab Emirates	8:29.64	R

==== Heat 8 ====
Rank	Rower	Country	Time	Notes
1	Ondřej Synek	Czech Republic	7:00.29	QAD
2	Mindaugas Griškonis	Lithuania	7:02.32	QAD
3	Abdelkhalek El-Banna	Egypt	7:17.27	R
4	Bendegúz Pétervári-Molnár	Hungary	7:28.49	R
5	Joseph Purman	Puerto Rico	7:30.85	R

=== Repechages ===
Repechage winners advanced to the AD quarterfinals. The remaining boats were sent to the EH quarterfinals.

==== Repechage 1 ====
Rank	Rower	Country	Time	Notes
1	Kevin Meador	United States	7:21.53	QAD
2	Robert Ven	Finland	7:26.64	QEH
3	Javier Insfrán	Paraguay	7:28.37	QEH
4	Vladislav Yakovlev	Kazakhstan	7:29.86	QEH

==== Repechage 2 ====
Rank	Rower	Country	Time	Notes
1	Mihai Chiruţă	Romania	7:12.16	QAD
2	Jordi Jofre	Spain	7:17.92	QEH
3	Shakhboz Kholmurzaev	Uzbekistan	7:25.99	QEH
4	Rohit Kumar	India	7:35.43	QEH

==== Repechage 3 ====
Rank	Rower	Country	Time	Notes
1	Onat Kazaklı	Turkey	7:21.68	QAD
2	Quentin Antognelli	Monaco	7:31.42	QEH
3	Kim Dong-yong	South Korea	7:33.90	QEH
4	Dara Alizadeh	Bermuda	7:47.91	QEH

==== Repechage 4 ====
Rank	Rower	Country	Time	Notes
1	Dani Fridman	Israel	7:32.93	QAD
2	Lukáš Babač	Slovakia	7:41.98	QEH
3	Andrei Jämsä	Estonia	7:52.45	QEH
4	Privel Hinkati	Benin	8:04.38	QEH

==== Repechage 5 ====
Rank	Rower	Country	Time	Notes
1	Aleksandar Aleksandrov	Azerbaijan	7:26.58	QAD
2	Abdelkhalek El-Banna	Egypt	7:37.83	QEH
3	Rillio Rii	Vanuatu	8:09.15	QEH

==== Repechage 6 ====
Rank	Rower	Country	Time	Notes
1	Thibaut Verhoeven	France	7:18.31	QAD
2	Bendegúz Pétervári-Molnár	Hungary	7:36.74	QEH
3	Ahmad Al Hammadi	United Arab Emirates	8:36.45	QEH

==== Repechage 7 ====
Rank	Rower	Country	Time	Notes
1	Kristian Vasilev	Bulgaria	7:19.61	QAD
2	Ángel Fournier	Cuba	7:25.49	QEH
3	Joseph Purman	Puerto Rico	7:37.51	QEH

==== Repechage 8 ====
Rank	Rower	Country	Time	Notes
1	Juan Carlos Cabrera	Mexico	7:21.27	QAD
2	Lukas Reim	Austria	7:21.29	QEH
3	Prem Nampratueng	Thailand	7:39.21	QEH

=== Quarterfinals EH ===
The three fastest boats in each quarter were sent to the E/F semifinals. The remaining boats were sent to the G/H semifinals.

==== Quarterfinal 1 ====
Rank	Rower	Country	Time	Notes
1	Jordi Jofre	Spain	7:10.98	SE/F
2	Vladislav Yakovlev	Kazakhstan	7:12.77	SE/F
3	Quentin Antognelli	Monaco	7:26.00	SE/F
4	Andrei Jämsä	Estonia	7:56.10	SG/H
5	Ahmad Al Hammadi	United Arab Emirates	8:17.19	SG/H

==== Quarterfinal 2 ====
Rank	Rower	Country	Time	Notes
1	Abdelkhalek El-Banna	Egypt	7:04.92	SE/F
2	Prem Nampratueng	Thailand	7:10.40	SE/F
3	Joseph Purman	Puerto Rico	7:12.44	SE/F
4	Rohit Kumar	India	7:13.85	SG/H
5	Lukáš Babač	Slovakia	7:38.73	SG/H

==== Quarterfinal 3 ====
Rank	Rower	Country	Time	Notes
1	Lukas Reim	Austria	7:07.03	SE/F
2	Shakhboz Kholmurzaev	Uzbekistan	7:08.64	SE/F
3	Bendegúz Pétervári-Molnár	Hungary	7:11.08	SE/F
4	Javier Insfrán	Paraguay	7:14.23	SG/H
5	Dara Alizadeh	Bermuda	7:24.04	SG/H

==== Quarterfinal 4 ====
Rank	Rower	Country	Time	Notes
1	Ángel Fournier	Cuba	7:02.08	SE/F
2	Robert Ven	Finland	7:04.56	SE/F
3	Kim Dong-yong	South Korea	7:12.17	SE/F
4	Privel Hinkati	Benin	7:36.20	SG/H
5	Rio Rii	Vanuatu	7:46.93	SG/H

=== Quarterfinals AD ===
The three fastest boats in each quarter advanced to the A/B semifinals. The remaining boats were sent to the C/D semifinals.

==== Quarterfinal 1 ====
Rank	Rower	Country	Time	Notes
1	Stef Broenink	Netherlands	6:48.75	SA/B
2	Stefanos Douskos	Greece	6:51.81	SA/B
3	Aleksandar Aleksandrov	Azerbaijan	6:52.22	SA/B
4	Nico Stahlberg	Switzerland	6:54.98	SC/D
5	Pilip Pavukou	Belarus	6:55.88	SC/D
6	Thibaut Verhoeven	France	7:00.76	SC/D

==== Quarterfinal 2 ====
Rank	Rower	Country	Time	Notes
1	Kjetil Borch	Norway	6:49.40	SA/B
2	Robbie Manson	New Zealand	6:51.39	SA/B
3	Damir Martin	Croatia	6:54.05	SA/B
4	Juan Carlos Cabrera	Mexico	6:56.55	SC/D
5	Kevin Meador	United States	7:02.59	SC/D
6	Aleksandar Filipović	Serbia	7:02.72	SC/D

==== Quarterfinal 3 ====
Rank	Rower	Country	Time	Notes
1	Oliver Zeidler	Germany	6:49.07	SA/B
2	Mindaugas Griškonis	Lithuania	6:50.59	SA/B
3	Natan Węgrzycki-Szymczyk	Poland	6:55.51	SA/B
4	Onat Kazaklı	Turkey	6:58.76	SC/D
5	Anders Backeus	Sweden	7:04.06	SC/D
6	Mihai Chiruţă	Romania	7:10.52	SC/D

==== Quarterfinal 4 ====
Rank	Rower	Country	Time	Notes
1	Ondřej Synek	Czech Republic	6:48.43	SA/B
2	Sverri Sandberg Nielsen	Denmark	6:48.96	SA/B
3	Simone Martini	Italy	6:51.45	SA/B
4	Tom Barras	Great Britain	6:53.13	SC/D
5	Dani Fridman	Israel	7:01.08	SC/D
6	Kristian Vasilev	Bulgaria	7:11.60	SC/D

=== Semifinals G/H ===
The three fastest boats in each semi were sent to the G final. The remaining boats were sent to the H final.

==== Semifinal 1 ====
Rank	Rower	Country	Time	Notes
1	Javier Insfrán	Paraguay	7:13.94	FG
2	Lukáš Babač	Slovakia	7:21.96	FG
3	Andrei Jämsä	Estonia	7:29.17	FG
4	Rio Rii	Vanuatu	7:33.02	FH

==== Semifinal 2 ====
Rank	Rower	Country	Time	Notes
1	Rohit Kumar	India	7:12.70	FG
2	Dara Alizadeh	Bermuda	7:23.82	FG
3	Privel Hinkati	Benin	7:25.87	FG
4	Ahmad Al Hammadi	United Arab Emirates	8:00.78	FH

=== Semifinals E/F ===
The three fastest boats in each semi were sent to the E final. The remaining boats were sent to the F final.

==== Semifinal 1 ====
Rank	Rower	Country	Time	Notes
1	Lukas Reim	Austria	6:54.91	FE
2	Jordi Jofre	Spain	6:55.01	FE
3	Robert Ven	Finland	6:56.64	FE
4	Kim Dong-yong	South Korea	6:59.42	FF
5	Quentin Antognelli	Monaco	7:05.74	FF
6	Prem Nampratueng	Thailand	7:14.85	FF

==== Semifinal 2 ====
Rank	Rower	Country	Time	Notes
1	Vladislav Yakovlev	Kazakhstan	6:58.10	FE
2	Abdelkhalek El-Banna	Egypt	6:58.54	FE
3	Ángel Fournier	Cuba	7:04.18	FE
4	Shakhboz Kholmurzaev	Uzbekistan	7:05.68	FF
5	Joseph Purman	Puerto Rico	7:07.04	FF
–	Bendegúz Pétervári-Molnár	Hungary	DNS	

=== Semifinals C/D ===
The three fastest boats in each semi were sent to the C final. The remaining boats were sent to the D final.

==== Semifinal 1 ====
Rank	Rower	Country	Time	Notes
1	Kristian Vasilev	Bulgaria	6:45.92	FC
2	Dani Fridman	Israel	6:46.51	FC
3	Thibaut Verhoeven	France	6:49.14	FC
4	Nico Stahlberg	Switzerland	6:49.24	FD
5	Onat Kazakli	Turkey	6:56.21	FD
6	Kevin Meador	United States	7:00.98	FD

==== Semifinal 2 ====
Rank	Rower	Country	Time	Notes
1	Tom Barras	Great Britain	6:49.15	FC
2	Aleksandar Filipović	Serbia	6:49.23	FC
3	Juan Carlos Cabrera	Mexico	6:53.99	FC
4	Mihai Chiruţă	Romania	7:00.80	FD
5	Anders Backeus	Sweden	7:02.72	FD
–	Pilip Pavukou	Belarus	DNS	

=== Semifinals A/B ===
The three fastest boats in each semi advanced to the A final. The remaining boats were sent to the B final.

==== Semifinal 1 ====
Rank	Rower	Country	Time	Notes
1	Oliver Zeidler	Germany	6:51.84	FA
2	Sverri Sandberg Nielsen	Denmark	6:52.93	FA
3	Stef Broenink	Netherlands	6:53.13	FA
4	Robbie Manson	New Zealand	7:00.73	FB
5	Simone Martini	Italy	7:10.66	FB
6	Aleksandar Aleksandrov	Azerbaijan	7:17.55	FB

==== Semifinal 2 ====
Rank	Rower	Country	Time	Notes
1	Ondřej Synek	Czech Republic	6:57.10	FA
2	Mindaugas Griškonis	Lithuania	6:58.13	FA
3	Kjetil Borch	Norway	7:00.36	FA
4	Damir Martin	Croatia	7:04.63	FB
5	Natan Węgrzycki-Szymczyk	Poland	7:10.61	FB
6	Stefanos Douskos	Greece	7:25.38	FB

=== Finals ===
The A final determined the rankings for places 1 to 6. Additional rankings were determined in the other finals.

==== Final H ====
Rank	Rower	Country	Time
1	Rillio Rii	Vanuatu	7:47.55
2	Ahmad Al Hammadi	United Arab Emirates	8:15.50

==== Final G ====
Rank	Rower	Country	Time
1	Javier Insfrán	Paraguay	7:13.12
2	Lukáš Babač	Slovakia	7:19.33
3	Rohit Kumar	India	7:20.58
4	Dara Alizadeh	Bermuda	7:24.74
5	Privel Hinkati	Benin	7:34.94
6	Andrei Jämsä	Estonia	8:00.56

==== Final F ====
Rank	Rower	Country	Time
1	Shakhboz Kholmurzaev	Uzbekistan	7:07.96
2	Kim Dong-yong	South Korea	7:08.29
3	Prem Nampratueng	Thailand	7:12.37
4	Quentin Antognelli	Monaco	7:15.25
5	Joseph Purman	Puerto Rico	7:18.13

==== Final E ====
Rank	Rower	Country	Time
1	Abdelkhalek El-Banna	Egypt	7:01.79
2	Ángel Fournier	Cuba	7:03.28
3	Jordi Jofre	Spain	7:04.23
4	Lukas Reim	Austria	7:04.23
5	Vladislav Yakovlev	Kazakhstan	7:05.44
6	Robert Ven	Finland	7:05.56

==== Final D ====
Rank	Rower	Country	Time
1	Nico Stahlberg	Switzerland	6:58.35
2	Onat Kazakli	Turkey	7:00.17
3	Kevin Meador	United States	7:04.29
4	Anders Backeus	Sweden	7:05.53
5	Mihai Chiruţă	Romania	7:06.94

==== Final C ====
Rank	Rower	Country	Time
1	Kristian Vasilev	Bulgaria	6:59.06
2	Tom Barras	Great Britain	6:59.45
3	Dani Fridman	Israel	7:02.06
4	Aleksandar Filipović	Serbia	7:03.46
5	Juan Carlos Cabrera	Mexico	7:05.05
6	Thibaut Verhoeven	France	7:16.07

==== Final B ====
Rank	Rower	Country	Time
1	Robbie Manson	New Zealand	6:56.27
2	Damir Martin	Croatia	6:56.42
3	Simone Martini	Italy	6:56.92
4	Natan Węgrzycki-Szymczyk	Poland	6:58.34
5	Stefanos Douskos	Greece	7:12.74
6	Aleksandar Aleksandrov	Azerbaijan	7:26.06

==== Final A ====
Rank	Rower	Country	Time
1st place, gold medalist(s)	Oliver Zeidler	Germany	6:44.55
2nd place, silver medalist(s)	Sverri Sandberg Nielsen	Denmark	6:44.58
3rd place, bronze medalist(s)	Kjetil Borch	Norway	6:44.84
4	Mindaugas Griškonis	Lithuania	6:45.24
5	Stef Broenink	Netherlands	6:45.58
6	Ondřej Synek	Czech Republic	6:47.93
