= Rowing at the 2020 Summer Olympics – Men's single sculls =

Men's single sculls at the Games of the XXXII Olympiad
- Olympic rowing
- Venue: Sea Forest Waterway
- Dates: 23–30 July 2021
- Competitors: 32 from 32 nations
- Winning time: 6:40.45

Medalists
1st place, gold medalist(s)		Stefanos Ntouskos	Greece
2nd place, silver medalist(s)		Kjetil Borch	Norway
3rd place, bronze medalist(s)		Damir Martin	Croatia

The men's single sculls event at the 2020 Summer Olympics took place from 23 to 30 July 2021 at the Sea Forest Waterway. 32 rowers from 32 nations competed.

== Background ==
This will be the 28th appearance of the event, which was not held at the first Games in 1896 (when bad weather forced the cancellation of all rowing events) but has been held at every Summer Olympics since 1900.

Of the 6 finalists from the 2016 Games, silver medalist Damir Martin of Croatia is the only one to return. Two-time reigning gold medalist Mahé Drysdale was defeated by Jordan Parry in New Zealand's selection process.

The three World Champions since the 2016 Games are Ondřej Synek of the Czech Republic (a three-time Olympic medalist), Kjetil Borch of Norway, and Oliver Zeidler of Germany. Synek announced on his Facebook page that he will not be going to Tokyo. Borch and Zeidler competed in Tokyo.

Benin, the Dominican Republic, the Ivory Coast, Nicaragua, and Saudi Arabia made their debut in the event. An athlete from Russia competed under the ROC flag. Italy and the Netherlands each made their 15th appearance, tied for most among nations competing in Tokyo and fourth-most among all nations (Great Britain at 22, the United States at 21, and Switzerland at 16 did not have competitors in this event at the 2020 Games).

== Qualification ==
Each National Olympic Committee (NOC) has been limited to a single boat (one rower) in the event since 1912. There are 32 qualifying places in the men's single sculls:

- 9 from the 2019 World Championship
- 5 from the Asia & Oceania qualification regatta
- 5 from the Africa qualification regatta
- 5 from the Americas qualification regatta
- 3 from the Europe qualification regatta
- 2 from the final qualification regatta
- 1 host nation place
- 2 invitational places

The COVID-19 pandemic delayed many of the events for qualifying for rowing.

== Competition format ==
This rowing event is a single scull event, meaning that each boat is propelled by a single rower. The "scull" portion means that the rower uses two oars, one on each side of the boat; this contrasts with sweep rowing in which each rower has one oar and rows on only one side (not feasible for singles events). The competition consists of multiple rounds. The competition continues to use the five-round format introduced in 2012. Finals are held to determine the placing of each boat; these finals are given letters with those nearer to the beginning of the alphabet meaning a better ranking. Semifinals are named based on which finals they fed, with each semifinal having two possible finals. The course uses the 2000 metres distance that became the Olympic standard in 1912.

During the first round six heats are held. The first three boats in each heat advance to the quarterfinals, while all others are relegated to the repechages.

The repechage is a round which offers rowers a second chance to qualify for the quarterfinals. Placing in the repechage heats determines which quarterfinal the boat would race in. The top two boats in each repechage heat move on to the quarterfinals, with the remaining boats going to the E/F semifinals.

The four quarterfinals are the second round for rowers still competing for medals. Placing in the quarterfinal heats determines which semifinal the boat would race in. The top three boats in each quarterfinal move on to the A/B semifinals, with the bottom three boats going to the C/D semifinals.

Six semifinals are held, two each of A/B semifinals, C/D semifinals, and E/F semifinals. For each semifinal race, the top three boats move on to the better of the two finals, while the bottom three boats go to the lesser of the two finals possible. For example, a second-place finish in an A/B semifinal would result in advancement to the A final.

The fifth and final round is the finals. Each final determines a set of rankings. The A final determines the medals, along with the rest of the places through 6th. The B final gives rankings from 7th to 12th, the C from 13th to 18th, and so on. Thus, to win a medal rowers have to finish in the top three of their heat (or top two of their repechage heat), top three of their quarterfinal, and top three of their A/B semifinal to reach the A final.

== Schedule ==
The competition is held over eight days. Times given are session start times; multiple rowing events might have races during a session.

All times are Japan Standard Time (UTC+9)

Date	Time	Round
Friday, 23 July 2021	8:30	Heats
Saturday, 24 July 2021	8:30	Repechage
Sunday, 25 July 2021	9:00	Semifinals E/F
Sunday, 25 July 2021	11:40	Quarterfinals
Thursday, 29 July 2021	11:00	Semifinals A/B
Thursday, 29 July 2021	11:40	Semifinals C/D
Friday, 30 July 2021	7:45	Final F
Friday, 30 July 2021	8:05	Final E
Friday, 30 July 2021	8:35	Final D
Friday, 30 July 2021	8:55	Final C
Friday, 30 July 2021	9:15	Final B
Friday, 30 July 2021	9:45	Final A

== Results ==
=== Heats ===
The first three of each heat qualify for the quarterfinals, while the remainder go to the repechage.

==== Heat 1 ====
Rank	Lane	Rower	Nation	Time	Notes
1	4	Kjetil Borch	Norway	6:54.46	Q
2	1	Bendegúz Pétervári-Molnár	Hungary	7:04.42	Q
3	2	Lucas Verthein	Brazil	7:05.00	Q
4	6	Jan Fleissner	Czech Republic	7:16.56	R
5	5	Abdulrahman Al-Fadhel	Kuwait	8:49.03	R
6	3	Mohammed Al-Khafaji	Iraq	8:57.01	R

==== Heat 2 ====
Rank	Lane	Rower	Nation	Time	Notes
1	2	Stefanos Ntouskos	Greece	6:59.49	Q
2	1	Jordan Parry	New Zealand	7:04.45	Q
3	6	Álvaro Torres	Peru	7:07.92	Q
4	5	Quentin Antognelli	Monaco	7:10.52	R
5	3	Ignacio Vásquez	Dominican Republic	7:43.71	R
6	4	Rio Rii	Vanuatu	8:00.98	R

==== Heat 3 ====
Rank	Lane	Rower	Nation	Time	Notes
1	3	Sverri Nielsen	Denmark	7:02.88	Q
2	5	Gennaro Di Mauro	Italy	7:06.87	Q
3	4	Vladislav Yakovlev	Kazakhstan	7:10.08	Q
4	2	Peter Purcell-Gilpin	Zimbabwe	7:10.65	R
5	1	Alhussein Ghambour	Libya	7:52.37	R

==== Heat 4 ====
Rank	Lane	Rower	Nation	Time	Notes
1	3	Trevor Jones	Canada	7:04.12	Q
2	4	Mindaugas Griškonis	Lithuania	7:05.88	Q
3	2	Onat Kazaklı	Turkey	7:20.11	Q
4	5	Dara Alizadeh	Bermuda	7:34.96	R
5	1	Husein Alireza	Saudi Arabia	7:54.18	R

==== Heat 5 ====
Rank	Lane	Rower	Nation	Time	Notes
1	1	Damir Martin	Croatia	7:09.17	Q
2	5	Aleksandr Vyazovkin	ROC	7:14.95	Q
3	4	Cris Nievarez	Philippines	7:22.97	Q
4	3	Félix Potoy	Nicaragua	7:32.54	R
5	2	Privel Hinkati	Benin	7:40.87	R

==== Heat 6 ====
Rank	Lane	Rower	Nation	Time	Notes
1	4	Oliver Zeidler	Germany	7:00.40	Q
2	1	Ryuta Arakawa	Japan	7:02.79	Q
3	3	Abdelkhalek El-Banna	Egypt	7:03.44	Q
4	2	Finn Florijn	Netherlands	7:04.56	R
5	5	Franck N'Dri	Ivory Coast	7:49.19	R

=== Repechage ===
The first two in each heat qualify for the quarterfinals; the rest go to Semifinals E/F (out of medal contention).

==== Repechage heat 1 ====
Rank	Lane	Rower	Nation	Time	Notes
1	4	Quentin Antognelli	Monaco	7:34.14	Q
2	1	Mohammed Al-Khafaji	Iraq	7:41.72	Q
3	3	Félix Potoy	Nicaragua	7:44.52	QEF
4	5	Alhussein Ghambour	Libya	7:57.88	QEF
5	2	Franck N'Dri	Ivory Coast	8:03.25	QEF

==== Repechage heat 2 ====
Rank	Lane	Rower	Nation	Time	Notes
1	2	Jan Fleissner	Czech Republic	7:29.90	Q
2	3	Dara Alizadeh	Bermuda	7:35.90	Q
3	4	Ignacio Vásquez	Dominican Republic	7:42.83	QEF
4	1	Privel Hinkati	Benin	7:55.93	QEF

==== Repechage heat 3 ====
Rank	Lane	Rower	Nation	Time	Notes
1	3	Peter Purcell-Gilpin	Zimbabwe	7:35.16	Q
2	2	Husein Alireza	Saudi Arabia	8:06.78	Q
3	1	Rio Rii	Vanuatu	8:17.00	QEF
4	5	Abdulrahman Al-Fadhel	Kuwait	9:04.73	QEF
	4	Finn Florijn	Netherlands		DNS

=== Quarterfinals ===
The first three of each heat qualify to the semifinals A/B, remaining Crews to Semifinal C/D

==== Quarterfinal 1 ====
Rank	Lane	Rower	Nation	Time	Notes
1	4	Kjetil Borch	Norway	7:10.97	QAB
2	3	Stefanos Ntouskos	Greece	7:12.77	QAB
3	2	Gennaro Di Mauro	Italy	7:26.25	QAB
4	1	Quentin Antognelli	Monaco	7:29.99	QCD
5	5	Abdelkhalek El-Banna	Egypt	7:32.86	QCD
6	6	Husein Alireza	Saudi Arabia	8:35.05	QCD

==== Quarterfinal 2 ====
Rank	Lane	Rower	Nation	Time	Notes
1	4	Sverri Nielsen	Denmark	7:10.52	QAB
2	3	Trevor Jones	Canada	7:17.65	QAB
3	5	Aleksandr Vyazovkin	ROC	7:20.04	QAB
4	2	Onat Kazaklı	Turkey	7:32.86	QCD
5	1	Dara Alizadeh	Bermuda	7:35.73	QCD
6	6	Peter Purcell-Gilpin	Zimbabwe	7:37.97	QCD

==== Quarterfinal 3 ====
Rank	Lane	Rower	Nation	Time	Notes
1	3	Damir Martin	Croatia	7:17.71	QAB
2	2	Bendegúz Pétervári-Molnár	Hungary	7:24.63	QAB
3	4	Ryuta Arakawa	Japan	7:26.04	QAB
4	5	Álvaro Torres	Peru	7:31.85	QCD
5	6	Jan Fleissner	Czech Republic	7:37.01	QCD
6	1	Vladislav Yakovlev	Kazakhstan	7:39.47	QCD

==== Quarterfinal 4 ====
Rank	Lane	Rower	Nation	Time	Notes
1	4	Oliver Zeidler	Germany	7:12.75	QAB
2	2	Lucas Verthein	Brazil	7:14.26	QAB
3	5	Mindaugas Griškonis	Lithuania	7:16.71	QAB
4	3	Jordan Parry	New Zealand	7:18.48	QCD
5	6	Cris Nievarez	Philippines	7:50.74	QCD
6	1	Mohammed Al-Khafaji	Iraq	8:03.55	QCD

=== Semifinals ===
The first three of each heat qualify to the better final (E, C, A) while the remainder go to the lower final (F, D, B). The exception is that for Semifinal E/F 1 the first two qualify to Final E instead of the first three.

==== Semifinal A/B 1 ====
Rank	Lane	Rower	Nation	Time	Notes
1	3	Kjetil Borch	Norway	6:42.92	FA
2	4	Damir Martin	Croatia	6:45.27	FA
3	6	Mindaugas Griškonis	Lithuania	6:45.90	FA
4	1	Gennaro Di Mauro	Italy	6:50.19	FB
5	5	Lucas Verthein	Brazil	7:02.87	FB
6	2	Trevor Jones	Canada	7:06.18	FB

==== Semifinal A/B 2 ====
Rank	Lane	Rower	Nation	Time	Notes
1	2	Stefanos Ntouskos	Greece	6:41.61	FA
2	4	Sverri Sandberg Nielsen	Denmark	6:44.00	FA
3	1	Aleksandr Vyazovkin	ROC	6:44.56	FA
4	3	Oliver Zeidler	Germany	6:45.16	FB
5	5	Bendegúz Pétervári-Molnár	Hungary	6:59.08	FB
6	6	Ryuta Arakawa	Japan	6:59.26	FB

==== Semifinal C/D 1 ====
Rank	Lane	Rower	Nation	Time	Notes
1	3	Álvaro Torres	Peru	7:02.49	FC
2	4	Quentin Antognelli	Monaco	7:06.03	FC
3	5	Dara Alizadeh	Bermuda	7:11.14	FC
4	6	Mohammed Al-Khafaji	Iraq	7:21.52	FD
5	2	Cris Nievarez	Philippines	7:26.05	FD
6	1	Husein Alireza	Saudi Arabia	7:53.99	FD

==== Semifinal C/D 2 ====
Rank	Lane	Rower	Nation	Time	Notes
1	3	Jordan Parry	New Zealand	6:57.70	FC
2	2	Abdelkhalek El-Banna	Egypt	6:58.84	FC
3	5	Jan Fleissner	Czech Republic	6:59.61	FC
4	1	Peter Purcell-Gilpin	Zimbabwe	7:01.72	FD
5	6	Vladislav Yakovlev	Kazakhstan	7:03.53	FD
6	4	Onat Kazaklı	Turkey	7:32.19	FD

==== Semifinal E/F 1 ====
Rank	Lane	Rower	Nation	Time	Notes
1	3	Félix Potoy	Nicaragua	7:45.02	FE
2	1	Privel Hinkati	Benin	7:49.46	FE
3	3	Rio Rii	Vanuatu	8:19.99	FF

==== Semifinal E/F 2 ====
Rank	Lane	Rower	Nation	Time	Notes
1	3	Ignacio Vásquez	Dominican Republic	7:42.80	FE
2	1	Franck N'Dri	Ivory Coast	7:55.12	FE
3	2	Al-Hussein Gambour	Libya	7:55.98	FE
4	4	Abdulrahman Al-Fadhel	Kuwait	8:56.83	FF

=== Finals ===
==== Final F ====
Rank	Lane	Rower	Nation	Time	Notes
30	2	Rio Rii	Vanuatu	7:49.82	
31	1	Abdulrahman Al-Fadhel	Kuwait	8:32.67	

==== Final E ====
Rank	Lane	Rower	Nation	Time	Notes
25	4	Ignacio Vásquez	Dominican Republic	7:25.88	
26	3	Félix Potoy	Nicaragua	7:28.00	
27	2	Privel Hinkati	Benin	7:38.58	
28	5	Franck N'Dri	Ivory Coast	7:42.55	
29	1	Al-Hussein Gambour	Libya	7:47.64	

==== Final D ====
Rank	Lane	Rower	Nation	Time	Notes
19	2	Vladislav Yakovlev	Kazakhstan	7:03.37	
20	4	Peter Purcell-Gilpin	Zimbabwe	7:03.85	
21	1	Onat Kazaklı	Turkey	7:13.65	
22	3	Mohammed Al-Khafaji	Iraq	7:18.65	
23	5	Cris Nievarez	Philippines	7:21.28	
24	6	Husein Alireza	Saudi Arabia	7:52.67	

==== Final C ====
Rank	Lane	Rower	Nation	Time	Notes
13	3	Jordan Parry	New Zealand	6:55.55	
14	2	Abdelkhalek El-Banna	Egypt	7:00.72	
15	5	Quentin Antognelli	Monaco	7:01.85	
16	1	Jan Fleissner	Czech Republic	7:02.93	
17	4	Álvaro Torres	Peru	7:03.69	
18	6	Dara Alizadeh	Bermuda	7:09.91	

==== Final B ====
Rank	Lane	Rower	Nation	Time	Notes
7	4	Oliver Zeidler	Germany	6.44.44	
8	3	Gennaro Di Mauro	Italy	6:47.38	
9	1	Trevor Jones	Canada	6:48.51	
10	5	Bendegúz Pétervári-Molnár	Hungary	6:50.45	
11	6	Ryuta Arakawa	Japan	6:50.91	
12	2	Lucas Verthein	Brazil	6:52.09	

==== Final A ====
Rank	Lane	Rower	Nation	Time	Notes
1st place, gold medalist(s)	4	Stefanos Ntouskos	Greece	6:40.45	OB
2nd place, silver medalist(s)	3	Kjetil Borch	Norway	6:41.66	
3rd place, bronze medalist(s)	2	Damir Martin	Croatia	6:42.58	
4	5	Sverri Sandberg Nielsen	Denmark	6:42.73	
5	6	Aleksandr Vyazovkin	ROC	6:49.09	
6	1	Mindaugas Griškonis	Lithuania	6:57.60	
