= 2018 World Rowing Championships – Men's single sculls =

Men's single sculls at the 2018 World Rowing Championships
- Venue: Plovdiv Regatta Venue
- Location: Plovdiv, Bulgaria
- Dates: 9–16 September
- Competitors: 32 from 32 nations
- Winning time: 6:38.31

Medalists
gold medal	Kjetil Borch	Norway
silver medal	Ondřej Synek	Czech Republic
bronze medal	Mindaugas Griškonis	Lithuania

The men's single sculls competition at the 2018 World Rowing Championships in Plovdiv took place at the Plovdiv Regatta Venue.

== Schedule ==
The schedule was as follows:

Date	Time	Round
Sunday 9 September 2018	12:17	Heats
Monday 10 September 2018	12:01	Repechages
Thursday 13 September 2018	09:49	Quarterfinals
Thursday 13 September 2018	16:37	Semifinals C/D
Thursday 13 September 2018	17:25	Semifinals E/F
Friday 14 September 2018	09:51	Semifinals A/B
Saturday 15 September 2018	16:21	Final D
Saturday 15 September 2018	16:45	Final E
Saturday 15 September 2018	16:53	Final F
Sunday 16 September 2018	09:38	Final C
Sunday 16 September 2018	10:38	Final B
Sunday 16 September 2018	12:04	Final A

All times are Eastern European Summer Time (UTC+3)

== Results ==
=== Heats ===
The three fastest boats in each heat advanced directly to the quarterfinals. The remaining boats were sent to the repechages.

==== Heat 1 ====
Rank	Rower	Country	Time	Notes
1	Robbie Manson	New Zealand	6:53.68	Q
2	Quentin Antognelli	Monaco	6:55.33	Q
3	Robert Ven	Finland	6:58.11	Q
4	Romuald Thomas	France	7:02.43	R
5	Andrei Jämsä	Estonia	7:22.90	R
6	Privel Hinkati	Benin	7:26.65	R

==== Heat 2 ====
Rank	Rower	Country	Time	Notes
1	Ondřej Synek	Czech Republic	6:56.73	Q
2	Bendegúz Pétervári-Molnár	Hungary	7:03.33	Q
3	Aleksandar Aleksandrov	Azerbaijan	7:06.90	Q
4	Mmbudzeni Masutha	South Africa	7:18.72	R
5	Abdelkhalek El-Banna	Egypt	7:20.30	R
6	Oleksandr Lukianenko	Ukraine	7:49.02	R

==== Heat 3 ====
Rank	Rower	Country	Time	Notes
1	Dzianis Mihal	Belarus	6:51.43	Q
2	Oliver Zeidler	Germany	6:52.55	Q
3	Dani Fridman	Israel	6:55.39	Q
4	Kevin Meador	United States	6:57.53	R
5	Onat Kazakli	Turkey	6:57.90	R

==== Heat 4 ====
Rank	Rower	Country	Time	Notes
1	Sverri Sandberg Nielsen	Denmark	6:50.01	Q
2	Marko Marjanović	Serbia	6:54.59	Q
3	Pierre De Loof	Belgium	6:55.17	Q
4	Anders Backeus	Sweden	7:01.91	R
5	Rio Rii	Vanuatu	7:42.39	R

==== Heat 5 ====
Rank	Rower	Country	Time	Notes
1	Kjetil Borch	Norway	6:41.00	Q
2	Nico Stahlberg	Switzerland	6:44.21	Q
3	Harry Leask	Great Britain	6:45.25	Q
4	Luke Letcher	Australia	6:47.69	R
5	Arturo Rivarola	Paraguay	7:25.39	R

==== Heat 6 ====
Rank	Rower	Country	Time	Notes
1	Mindaugas Griškonis	Lithuania	6:51.07	Q
2	Natan Węgrzycki-Szymczyk	Poland	6:58.78	Q
3	Simone Martini	Italy	7:02.00	Q
4	Brian Rosso	Argentina	7:22.57	R
5	Methasit Phromphoem	Thailand	7:37.62	R

=== Repechages ===
The two fastest boats in each repechage advanced to the quarterfinals. The remaining boats were sent to the E/F semifinals.

==== Repechage 1 ====
Rank	Rower	Country	Time	Notes
1	Onat Kazakli	Turkey	7:00.75	Q
2	Romuald Thomas	France	7:01.48	Q
3	Brian Rosso	Argentina	7:04.15	SE/F
4	Oleksandr Lukianenko	Ukraine	7:23.60	SE/F
5	Arturo Rivarola	Paraguay	7:27.62	SE/F

==== Repechage 2 ====
Rank	Rower	Country	Time	Notes
1	Anders Backeus	Sweden	7:06.81	Q
2	Mmbudzeni Masutha	South Africa	7:14.42	Q
3	Andrei Jämsä	Estonia	7:16.97	SE/F
4	Methasit Phromphoem	Thailand	7:34.80	SE/F

==== Repechage 3 ====
Rank	Rower	Country	Time	Notes
1	Kevin Meador	United States	6:56.56	Q
2	Luke Letcher	Australia	7:03.33	Q
3	Abdelkhalek El-Banna	Egypt	7:10.02	SE/F
4	Privel Hinkati	Benin	7:29.41	SE/F
5	Rillio Rii	Vanuatu	7:40.86	SE/F

=== Quarterfinals ===
The three fastest boats in each quarter advanced to the A/B semifinals. The remaining boats were sent to the C/D semifinals.

==== Quarterfinal 1 ====
Rank	Rower	Country	Time	Notes
1	Robbie Manson	New Zealand	6:49.75	SA/B
2	Mindaugas Griškonis	Lithuania	6:51.47	SA/B
3	Nico Stahlberg	Switzerland	6:54.43	SA/B
4	Luke Letcher	Australia	7:00.31	SC/D
5	Anders Backeus	Sweden	7:01.67	SC/D
6	Pierre De Loof	Belgium	7:06.74	SC/D

==== Quarterfinal 2 ====
Rank	Rower	Country	Time	Notes
1	Ondřej Synek	Czech Republic	6:52.24	SA/B
2	Kjetil Borch	Norway	6:54.29	SA/B
3	Marko Marjanović	Serbia	6:57.79	SA/B
4	Romuald Thomas	France	6:59.31	SC/D
5	Kevin Meador	United States	7:08.69	SC/D
6	Dani Fridman	Israel	7:25.61	SC/D

==== Quarterfinal 3 ====
Rank	Rower	Country	Time	Notes
1	Harry Leask	Great Britain	6:53.38	SA/B
2	Dzianis Mihal	Belarus	6:56.22	SA/B
3	Bendegúz Pétervári-Molnár	Hungary	6:57.81	SA/B
4	Simone Martini	Italy	6:59.14	SC/D
5	Onat Kazakli	Turkey	7:18.31	SC/D
6	Quentin Antognelli	Monaco	7:25.62	SC/D

==== Quarterfinal 4 ====
Rank	Rower	Country	Time	Notes
1	Oliver Zeidler	Germany	6:49.10	SA/B
2	Sverri Sandberg Nielsen	Denmark	6:51.37	SA/B
3	Natan Węgrzycki-Szymczyk	Poland	6:58.13	SA/B
4	Aleksandar Aleksandrov	Azerbaijan	7:01.70	SC/D
5	Robert Ven	Finland	7:02.89	SC/D
6	Mmbudzeni Masutha	South Africa	7:48.91	SC/D

=== Semifinals E/F ===
The two fastest boats in semi 1 and three in semi 2 were sent to the E final. The remaining boats were sent to the F final.

==== Semifinals 1 ====
Rank	Rower	Country	Time	Notes
1	Abdelkhalek El-Banna	Egypt	7:27.82	FE
2	Methasit Phromphoem	Thailand	7:59.89	FE
3	Rillio Rii	Vanuatu	8:12.68	FF

==== Semifinals 2 ====
Rank	Rower	Country	Time	Notes
1	Andrei Jämsä	Estonia	7:47.01	FE
2	Oleksandr Lukianenko	Ukraine	7:50.66	FE
3	Arturo Rivarola	Paraguay	7:56.41	FE
4	Privel Hinkati	Benin	8:08.70	FF

=== Semifinals C/D ===
The three fastest boats in each semi advanced to the C final. The remaining boats were sent to the D final.

==== Semifinals 1 ====
Rank	Rower	Country	Time	Notes
1	Pierre De Loof	Belgium	7:09.94	FC
2	Robert Ven	Finland	7:10.30	FC
3	Simone Martini	Italy	7:11.01	FC
4	Luke Letcher	Australia	7:14.87	FD
5	Kevin Meador	United States	7:17.90	FD
6	Mmbudzeni Masutha	South Africa	7:29.26	FD

==== Semifinals 2 ====
Rank	Rower	Country	Time	Notes
1	Dani Fridman	Israel	7:07.73	FC
2	Onat Kazakli	Turkey	7:09.68	FC
3	Romuald Thomas	France	7:09.93	FC
4	Anders Backeus	Sweden	7:13.97	FD
5	Quentin Antognelli	Monaco	7:27.46	FD
6	Aleksandar Aleksandrov	Azerbaijan	7:32.33	FD

=== Semifinals A/B ===
The three fastest boats in each semi advanced to the A final. The remaining boats were sent to the B final.

==== Semifinals 1 ====
Rank	Rower	Country	Time	Notes
1	Kjetil Borch	Norway	6:43.35	FA
2	Harry Leask	Great Britain	6:45.05	FA
3	Robbie Manson	New Zealand	6:45.22	FA
4	Sverri Sandberg Nielsen	Denmark	6:45.99	FB
5	Natan Węgrzycki-Szymczyk	Poland	6:48.96	FB
6	Nico Stahlberg	Switzerland	6:54.40	FB

==== Semifinals 2 ====
Rank	Rower	Country	Time	Notes
1	Ondřej Synek	Czech Republic	6:48.55	FA
2	Oliver Zeidler	Germany	6:49.63	FA
3	Mindaugas Griškonis	Lithuania	6:51.72	FA
4	Dzianis Mihal	Belarus	7:00.74	FB
5	Bendegúz Pétervári-Molnár	Hungary	7:03.30	FB
6	Marko Marjanović	Serbia	7:15.55	FB

=== Finals ===
The A final determined the rankings for places 1 to 6. Additional rankings were determined in the other finals.

==== Final F ====
Rank	Rower	Country	Time
1	Privel Hinkati	Benin	7:24.51
2	Rillio Rii	Vanuatu	7:36.76

==== Final E ====
Rank	Rower	Country	Time
1	Abdelkhalek El-Banna	Egypt	7:04.03
2	Andrei Jämsä	Estonia	7:07.76
3	Oleksandr Lukianenko	Ukraine	7:11.43
4	Arturo Rivarola	Paraguay	7:17.86
5	Methasit Phromphoem	Thailand	7:23.77

==== Final D ====
Rank	Rower	Country	Time
1	Luke Letcher	Australia	6:54.32
2	Kevin Meador	United States	6:56.64
3	Aleksandar Aleksandrov	Azerbaijan	7:02.17
4	Mmbudzeni Masutha	South Africa	7:03.40
5	Quentin Antognelli	Monaco	DNS
6	Anders Backeus	Sweden	DNS

==== Final C ====
Rank	Rower	Country	Time
1	Dani Fridman	Israel	6:50.83
2	Pierre De Loof	Belgium	6:55.70
3	Robert Ven	Finland	6:57.83
4	Romuald Thomas	France	6:59.75
5	Simone Martini	Italy	7:06.31
6	Onat Kazakli	Turkey	7:21.52

==== Final B ====
Rank	Rower	Country	Time
1	Sverri Sandberg Nielsen	Denmark	6:49.30
2	Natan Węgrzycki-Szymczyk	Poland	6:50.24
3	Nico Stahlberg	Switzerland	6:51.84
4	Dzianis Mihal	Belarus	6:52.71
5	Marko Marjanović	Serbia	6:54.75
6	Bendegúz Pétervári-Molnár	Hungary	DNS

==== Final A ====
Rank	Rower	Country	Time
1st place, gold medalist(s)	Kjetil Borch	Norway	6:38.31
2nd place, silver medalist(s)	Ondřej Synek	Czech Republic	6:39.92
3rd place, bronze medalist(s)	Mindaugas Griškonis	Lithuania	6:42.90
4	Harry Leask	Great Britain	6:45.02
5	Robbie Manson	New Zealand	6:46.11
6	Oliver Zeidler	Germany	6:50.71
