= 2022 World Rowing Championships – Men's single sculls =

Men's single sculls at the 2022 World Rowing Championships
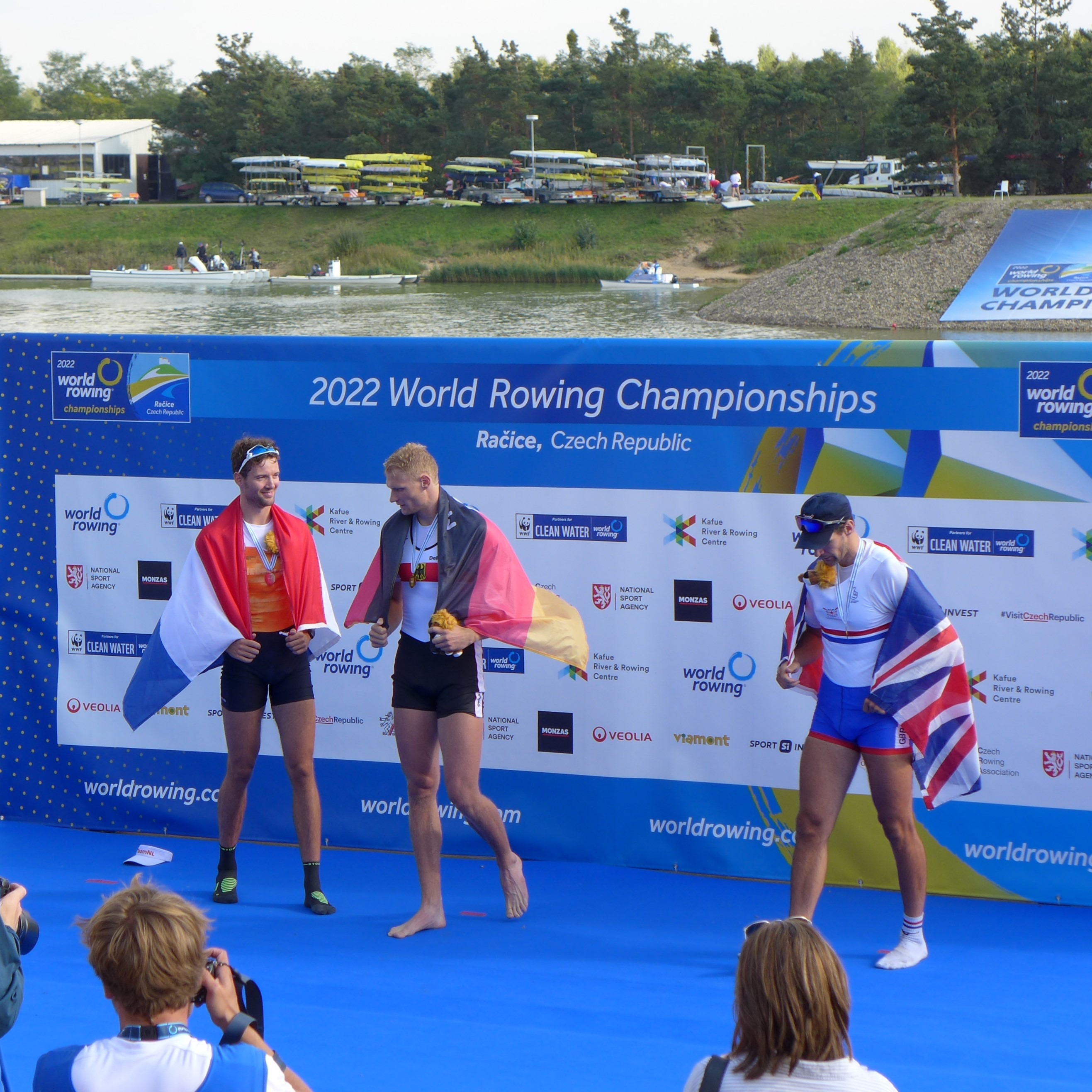
- Medalists of the competition
- Venue: Labe aréna
- Location: Račice, Czech Republic
- Dates: 18 September – 25 September
- Competitors: 35 from 35 nations
- Winning time: 6:48.67

Medalists
gold medal	Oliver Zeidler	Germany
silver medal	Melvin Twellaar	Netherlands
bronze medal	Graeme Thomas	Great Britain

The men's single sculls competition at the 2022 World Rowing Championships took place at the Račice regatta venue.

== Schedule ==
The schedule was as follows:

Date	Time	Round
Sunday 18 September 2022	09:30	Heats
Monday 19 September 2022	15:30	Repechages
Wednesday 21 September 2022	10:00	Quarterfinals AD
Wednesday 21 September 2022	12:14	Semifinals E/F
Thursday 22 September 2022	15:20	Semifinals C/D
Thursday 22 September 2022	16:30	Final F
Thursday 22 September 2022	16:35	Final E
Friday 23 September 2022	11:16	Semifinals A/B
Sunday 25 September 2022	10:40	Final D
Sunday 25 September 2022	11:16	Final C
Sunday 25 September 2022	12:12	Final B
Sunday 25 September 2022	14:44	Final A

All times are Central European Summer Time (UTC+2)

== Results ==
=== Heats ===
The three fastest boats in each heat advanced directly to the AD quarterfinals. The remaining boats were sent to the repechages.

==== Heat 1 ====
Rank	Rower	Country	Time	Notes
1	Oliver Zeidler	Germany	6:46.31	QAD
2	Jordan Parry	New Zealand	6:48.33	QAD
3	Ryuta Arakawa	Japan	6:53.31	QAD
4	Eskil Borgh	Sweden	7:15.70	R
5	Quentin Antognelli	Monaco	7:22.73	R
6	Jordi Jofre	Spain	7:41.51	R

==== Heat 2 ====
Rank	Rower	Country	Time	Notes
1	Melvin Twellaar	Netherlands	6:56.15	QAD
2	Han Wei	China	7:02.26	QAD
3	Jack Cleary	Australia	7:08.46	QAD
4	Bahman Nasiri	Azerbaijan	7:41.52	R
5	Viktor Pivač	Serbia	7:52.45	R
6	Rodrigue Ibrahim	Lebanon	8:32.41	R

==== Heat 3 ====
Rank	Rower	Country	Time	Notes
1	Stefanos Ntouskos	Greece	6:55.30	QAD
2	Trevor Jones	Canada	6:58.41	QAD
3	Brian Colsh	Ireland	6:59.99	QAD
4	André Pinto	Portugal	7:02.43	R
5	Bakr Al-Dulaimi	Iraq	7:30.55	R
6	Privel Hinkati	Benin	8:01.67	R

==== Heat 4 ====
Rank	Rower	Country	Time	Notes
1	Graeme Thomas	Great Britain	6:49.93	QAD
2	Kjetil Borch	Norway	6:52.36	QAD
3	Piotr Płomiński	Poland	6:57.40	QAD
4	Matteo Sartori	Italy	7:02.98	R
5	Jan Potůček	Czech Republic	7:19.43	R
6	Stephen Cox	Zimbabwe	7:23.68	R

==== Heat 5 ====
Rank	Rower	Country	Time	Notes
1	Kristian Vasilev	Bulgaria	6:58.54	QAD
2	Mohamed Taieb	Tunisia	7:01.58	QAD
3	Mmbudzeni Masutha	South Africa	7:03.69	QAD
4	Joel Naukkarinen	Finland	7:05.36	R
5	Alexandros Zisimidis	Cyprus	7:19.15	R
6	Filip-Matej Pfeifer	Slovenia	7:32.67	R

==== Heat 6 ====
Rank	Rower	Country	Time	Notes
1	Ben Davison	United States	6:54.02	QAD
2	Bastian Secher	Denmark	6:59.26	QAD
3	Bendegúz Pétervári-Molnár	Hungary	7:05.21	QAD
4	Scott Bärlocher	Switzerland	7:06.62	R
5	Mindaugas Griškonis	Lithuania	7:13.34	R

=== Repechages ===
The two fastest boats in each repechage advanced to the AD quarterfinals. The remaining boats were sent to the EF semifinals.

==== Repechage 1 ====
Rank	Rower	Country	Time	Notes
1	Mindaugas Griškonis	Lithuania	6:53.64	QAD
2	Jordi Jofre	Spain	6:55.32	QAD
3	Bahman Nasiri	Azerbaijan	6:59.74	SE/F
4	Joel Naukkarinen	Finland	7:08.33	SE/F
5	Stephen Cox	Zimbabwe	7:17.88	SE/F
6	Bakr Al-Dulaimi	Iraq	7:23.89	SE/F

==== Repechage 2 ====
Rank	Rower	Country	Time	Notes
1	Matteo Sartori	Italy	7:00.37	QAD
2	Eskil Borgh	Sweden	7:01.96	QAD
3	Alexandros Zisimidis	Cyprus	7:06.11	SE/F
4	Viktor Pivač	Serbia	7:13.82	SE/F
5	Privel Hinkati	Benin	7:43.13	SE/F

==== Repechage 3 ====
Rank	Rower	Country	Time	Notes
1	Filip-Matej Pfeifer	Slovenia	6:58.06	QAD
2	Scott Bärlocher	Switzerland	7:01.44	QAD
3	André Pinto	Portugal	7:06.27	SE/F
4	Quentin Antognelli	Monaco	7:18.75	SE/F
5	Jan Potůček	Czech Republic	7:25.03	SE/F
6	Rodrigue Ibrahim	Lebanon	8:50.20	SE/F

=== Quarterfinals A/D ===
The three fastest boats in each Quarterfinal advanced directly to the AB semifinals. The remaining boats were sent to the CD semifinals.

==== Quarterfinal 1 ====
Rank	Rower	Country	Time	Notes
1	Melvin Twellaar	Netherlands	6:51.87	SA/B
2	Oliver Zeidler	Germany	6:57.79	SA/B
3	Trevor Jones	Canada	7:02.06	SA/B
4	Bendegúz Pétervári-Molnár	Hungary	7:08.47	SC/D
5	Scott Bärlocher	Switzerland	7:10.42	SC/D
6	Mindaugas Griškonis	Lithuania	8:07.26	SC/D

==== Quarterfinal 2 ====
Rank	Rower	Country	Time	Notes
1	Graeme Thomas	Great Britain	6:58.56	SA/B
2	Stefanos Ntouskos	Greece	7:00.03	SA/B
3	Jack Cleary	Australia	7:03.09	SA/B
4	Filip-Matej Pfeifer	Slovenia	7:03.13	SC/D
5	Eskil Borgh	Sweden	7:07.21	SC/D
6	Mohamed Taieb	Tunisia	7:12.57	SC/D

==== Quarterfinal 3 ====
Rank	Rower	Country	Time	Notes
1	Jordan Parry	New Zealand	6:53.57	SA/B
2	Bastian Secher	Denmark	6:55.91	SA/B
3	Piotr Płomiński	Poland	6:56.97	SA/B
4	Brian Colsh	Ireland	6:58.73	SC/D
5	Matteo Sartori	Italy	7:19.66	SC/D
6	Kristian Vasilev	Bulgaria	7:51.16	SC/D

==== Quarterfinal 4 ====
Rank	Rower	Country	Time	Notes
1	Kjetil Borch	Norway	6:53.14	SA/B
2	Ryuta Arakawa	Japan	6:54.10	SA/B
3	Ben Davison	United States	6:56.28	SA/B
4	Han Wei	China	6:58.28	SC/D
5	Mmbudzeni Masutha	South Africa	7:11.13	SC/D
6	Jordi Jofre	Spain	7:16.85	SC/D

=== Semifinals E/F ===
The three fastest boats in each Semifinal advanced directly to the Final E. The remaining boats were sent to the Final F.

==== Semifinal 1 ====
Rank	Rower	Country	Time	Notes
1	André Pinto	Portugal	7:22.49	FE
2	Bahman Nasiri	Azerbaijan	7:25.31	FE
3	Jan Potůček	Czech Republic	7:27.05	FE
4	Viktor Pivač	Serbia	7:35.51	FF
5	Bakr Al-Dulaimi	Iraq	7:38.91	FF

==== Semifinal 2 ====
Rank	Rower	Country	Time	Notes
1	Quentin Antognelli	Monaco	7:14.72	FE
2	Joel Naukkarinen	Finland	7:16.87	FE
3	Alexandros Zisimidis	Cyprus	7:18.50	FE
4	Stephen Cox	Zimbabwe	7:28.89	FF
5	Privel Hinkati	Benin	8:01.68	FF
6	Rodrigue Ibrahim	Lebanon	8:36.70	FF

=== Semifinals C/D ===
The three fastest boats in each semi advanced to the C final. The remaining boats were sent to the D final.

==== Semifinal 1 ====
Rank	Rower	Country	Time	Notes
1	Mindaugas Griškonis	Lithuania	7:14.52	FC
2	Bendegúz Pétervári-Molnár	Hungary	7:20.23	FC
3	Filip-Matej Pfeifer	Slovenia	7:22.99	FC
4	Mmbudzeni Masutha	South Africa	7:27.02	FD
5	Matteo Sartori	Italy	7:36.66	FD
	Kristian Vasilev	Bulgaria	DNS	

==== Semifinal 2 ====
Rank	Rower	Country	Time	Notes
1	Han Wei	China	7:18.60	FC
2	Brian Colsh	Ireland	7:19.43	FC
3	Eskil Borgh	Sweden	7:19.89	FC
4	Jordi Jofre	Spain	7:20.14	FD
5	Mohamed Taieb	Tunisia	7:22.81	FD
6	Scott Bärlocher	Switzerland	7:24.71	FD

=== Semifinals A/B ===
The three fastest boats in each semi advanced to the A final. The remaining boats were sent to the B final.

==== Semifinal 1 ====
Rank	Rower	Country	Time	Notes
1	Melvin Twellaar	Netherlands	6:48.04	FA
2	Kjetil Borch	Norway	6:50.73	FA
3	Stefanos Ntouskos	Greece	6:51.54	FA
4	Bastian Secher	Denmark	6:53.54	FB
5	Trevor Jones	Canada	6:55.17	FB
6	Piotr Płomiński	Poland	7:00.74	FB

==== Semifinal 2 ====
Rank	Rower	Country	Time	Notes
1	Oliver Zeidler	Germany	6:44.03	FA
2	Graeme Thomas	Great Britain	6:45.29	FA
3	Jordan Parry	New Zealand	6:46.33	FA
4	Ryuta Arakawa	Japan	6:50.00	FB
5	Ben Davison	United States	6:53.05	FB
6	Jack Cleary	Australia	7:00.39	FB

=== Finals ===
The A final determined the rankings for places 1 to 6. Additional rankings were determined in the other finals

==== Final F ====
Rank	Rower	Country	Time	Total rank
1	Stephen Cox	Zimbabwe	7:36.17	30
2	Viktor Pivač	Serbia	7:41.39	31
3	Bakr Al-Dulaimi	Iraq	7:48.58	32
4	Privel Hinkati	Benin	8:25.94	33
5	Rodrigue Ibrahim	Lebanon	8:55.51	34

==== Final E ====
Rank	Rower	Country	Time	Total rank
1	Quentin Antognelli	Monaco	7:23.05	24
2	André Pinto	Portugal	7:30.84	25
3	Alexandros Zisimidis	Cyprus	7:31.17	26
4	Bahman Nasiri	Azerbaijan	7:33.12	27
5	Joel Naukkarinen	Finland	7:35.94	28
6	Jan Potůček	Czech Republic	7:39.38	29

==== Final D ====
Rank	Rower	Country	Time	Total rank
1	Jordi Jofre	Spain	7:10.38	19
2	Matteo Sartori	Italy	7:10.46	20
3	Mmbudzeni Masutha	South Africa	7:13.31	21
4	Mohamed Taieb	Tunisia	7:15.01	22
5	Scott Bärlocher	Switzerland	7:19.13	23

==== Final C ====
Rank	Rower	Country	Time	Total rank
1	Bendegúz Pétervári-Molnár	Hungary	7:02.69	13
2	Mindaugas Griškonis	Lithuania	7:03.80	14
3	Brian Colsh	Ireland	7:07.24	15
4	Han Wei	China	7:09.97	16
5	Eskil Borgh	Sweden	7:20.48	17
6	Filip-Matej Pfeifer	Slovenia	7:52.01	18

==== Final B ====
Rank	Rower	Country	Time	Total rank
1	Ryuta Arakawa	Japan	6:55.98	7
2	Ben Davison	United States	6:58.72	8
3	Bastian Secher	Denmark	7:00.22	9
4	Trevor Jones	Canada	7:03.49	10
5	Piotr Płomiński	Poland	7:05.37	11
6	Jack Cleary	Australia	7:09.46	12

==== Final A ====
Rank	Rower	Country	Time	Notes
1st place, gold medalist(s)	Oliver Zeidler	Germany	6:48.67	
2nd place, silver medalist(s)	Melvin Twellaar	Netherlands	6:50.12	
3rd place, bronze medalist(s)	Graeme Thomas	Great Britain	6:51.44	
4	Jordan Parry	New Zealand	6:52.25	
5	Kjetil Borch	Norway	6:59.45	
6	Stefanos Ntouskos	Greece	7:10.64	
