= Rowing at the 2022 Asian Games – Men's single sculls =

Men's single sculls at the 2022 Asian Games
- Venue: Fuyang Water Sports Centre
- Date: 20–25 September 2023
- Competitors: 15 from 15 nations

Medalists
gold medal	Zhang Liang	China
silver medal	Ryuta Arakawa	Japan
bronze medal	Chiu Hin Chun	Hong Kong

The men's single sculls competition at the 2022 Asian Games in Hangzhou, China was held from 20 to 25 September 2023 at the Fuyang Water Sports Centre.

== Schedule ==
All times are China Standard Time (UTC+08:00)

Date	Time	Event
Wednesday, 20 September 2023	15:30	Heats
Thursday, 21 September 2023	15:10	Repechage
Friday, 22 September 2023	15:20	Semifinals
Friday, 22 September 2023	15:40	Final C
Monday, 25 September 2023	09:20	Finals

== Results ==
=== Heats ===
- Qualification: 1–3 → Semifinals A/B (SA/B), 4–5 → Repechage (R)

==== Heat 1 ====
Rank	Athlete	Time	Notes
1	Chiu Hin Chun (HKG)	7:08.70	SA/B
2	Vladislav Yakovlev (KAZ)	7:10.41	SA/B
3	Balraj Panwar (IND)	7:11.01	SA/B
4	Kim Jong-min (KOR)	7:39.48	R
5	Toh Guo Wei (SGP)	7:55.02	R

==== Heat 2 ====
Rank	Athlete	Time	Notes
1	Zhang Liang (CHN)	7:07.55	SA/B
2	Ryuta Arakawa (JPN)	7:17.95	SA/B
3	Cris Nievarez (PHI)	7:20.51	SA/B
4	Mohamed Nafiran (SRI)	7:37.03	R
5	Hamad Al-Matrooshi (UAE)	8:00.83	R

==== Heat 3 ====
Rank	Athlete	Time	Notes
1	Amir Hossein Mahmoudpour (IRI)	7:27.30	SA/B
2	Mohammed Riyadh (IRQ)	7:32.90	SA/B
3	Zahid Iqbal Khan (PAK)	7:34.60	SA/B
4	Abdulrahman Al-Fadhel (KUW)	8:00.17	R
5	Rakan Alireza (KSA)	8:23.19	R

=== Repechage ===
- Qualification: 1–3 → Semifinals A/B (SA/B), 4–6 → Final C (FC)

Rank	Athlete	Time	Notes
1	Kim Jong-min (KOR)	7:32.94	SA/B
2	Mohamed Nafiran (SRI)	7:48.92	SA/B
3	Abdulrahman Al-Fadhel (KUW)	7:55.29	SA/B
4	Hamad Al-Matrooshi (UAE)	8:02.89	FC
5	Toh Guo Wei (SGP)	8:08.38	FC
6	Rakan Alireza (KSA)	8:09.80	FC

=== Semifinals ===
- Qualification: 1–3 → Final A (FA), 4–6 → Final B (FB)

==== Semifinal A/B 1 ====
Rank	Athlete	Time	Notes
1	Chiu Hin Chun (HKG)	7:23.50	FA
2	Ryuta Arakawa (JPN)	7:41.93	FA
3	Amir Hossein Mahmoudpour (IRI)	7:47.67	FA
4	Zahid Iqbal Khan (PAK)	7:56.96	FB
5	Mohamed Nafiran (SRI)	7:57.55	FB
6	Abdulrahman Al-Fadhel (KUW)	8:22.23	FB

==== Semifinal A/B 2 ====
Rank	Athlete	Time	Notes
1	Zhang Liang (CHN)	7:12.77	FA
2	Vladislav Yakovlev (KAZ)	7:19.27	FA
3	Balraj Panwar (IND)	7:22.22	FA
4	Cris Nievarez (PHI)	7:25.65	FB
5	Mohammed Riyadh (IRQ)	7:29.07	FB
6	Kim Jong-min (KOR)	7:29.82	FB

=== Finals ===
==== Final C ====
Rank	Athlete	Time
1	Hamad Al-Matrooshi (UAE)	8:03.66
2	Toh Guo Wei (SGP)	8:08.71
3	Rakan Alireza (KSA)	8:21.98

==== Final B ====
Rank	Athlete	Time
1	Mohammed Riyadh (IRQ)	7:16:72
2	Cris Nievarez (PHI)	7:19:45
3	Kim Jong-min (KOR)	7:29:55
4	Mohamed Nafiran (SRI)	7:39:20
5	Zahid Iqbal Khan (PAK)	7:44:91
6	Abdulrahman Al-Fadhel (KUW)	7:48:91

==== Final A ====
Rank	Athlete	Time
1st place, gold medalist(s)	Zhang Liang (CHN)	6:57:06
2nd place, silver medalist(s)	Ryuta Arakawa (JPN)	6:59:79
3rd place, bronze medalist(s)	Chiu Hin Chun (HKG)	7:00:55
4	Balraj Panwar (IND)	7:08:79
5	Vladislav Yakovlev (KAZ)	7:20:99
6	Amir Hossein Mahmoudpour (IRI)	7:23:97
