= Rowing at the 2018 Asian Games – Men's single sculls =

Men's single sculls at the 2018 Asian Games
- Venue: Jakabaring Lake
- Date: 19–23 August 2018
- Competitors: 12 from 12 nations

Medalists
gold medal	Zhang Liang	China
silver medal	Kim Dong-yong	South Korea
bronze medal	Ryuta Arakawa	Japan

The men's single sculls competition at the 2018 Asian Games in Palembang, Indonesia was held from 19 August to 23 August at the JSC Lake.

== Schedule ==
All times are Western Indonesia Time (UTC+07:00)

Date	Time	Event
Sunday, 19 August 2018	09:10	Heats
Tuesday, 21 August 2018	09:00	Repechages
Thursday, 23 August 2018	09:00	Finals

== Results ==
=== Heats ===
- Qualification: 1 → Final A (FA), 2–6 → Repechages (R)

==== Heat 1 ====
Rank	Athlete	Time	Notes
1	Ryuta Arakawa (JPN)	7:56.08	FA
2	Dattu Baban Bhokanal (IND)	8:09.21	R
3	Mojtaba Shojaei (IRI)	8:21.77	R
4	Siripong Chaiwichitchonkul (THA)	8:39.68	R
5	Husein Alireza (KSA)	8:58.16	R
6	Amjad Baig (PAK)	9:24.90	R

==== Heat 2 ====
Rank	Athlete	Time	Notes
1	Zhang Liang (CHN)	7:51.99	FA
2	Kim Dong-yong (KOR)	7:59.58	R
3	Chan Chi Fung (HKG)	8:10.90	R
4	Vladislav Yakovlev (KAZ)	8:12.64	R
5	Jasurbek Mavlanov (UZB)	8:37.92	R
6	Khairuddin Azwi (MAS)	9:17.55	R

=== Repechages ===
- Qualification: 1–2 → Final A (FA), 3–5 → Final B (FB)

==== Repechage 1 ====
Rank	Athlete	Time	Notes
1	Dattu Baban Bhokanal (IND)	7:45.71	FA
2	Chan Chi Fung (HKG)	7:49.57	FA
3	Jasurbek Mavlanov (UZB)	7:59.45	FB
4	Siripong Chaiwichitchonkul (THA)	8:18.20	FB
5	Amjad Baig (PAK)	8:34.50	FB

==== Repechage 2 ====
Rank	Athlete	Time	Notes
1	Kim Dong-yong (KOR)	7:40.97	FA
2	Vladislav Yakovlev (KAZ)	7:43.46	FA
3	Mojtaba Shojaei (IRI)	8:02.94	FB
4	Husein Alireza (KSA)	8:18.83	FB
5	Khairuddin Azwi (MAS)	8:37.41	FB

=== Finals ===
==== Final B ====
Rank	Athlete	Time
1	Jasurbek Mavlanov (UZB)	7:44.59
2	Mojtaba Shojaei (IRI)	7:49.36
3	Husein Alireza (KSA)	7:59.18
4	Siripong Chaiwichitchonkul (THA)	8:01.41
5	Amjad Baig (PAK)	8:20.55
6	Khairuddin Azwi (MAS)	8:24.49

==== Final A ====
Rank	Athlete	Time
1st place, gold medalist(s)	Zhang Liang (CHN)	7:25.36
2nd place, silver medalist(s)	Kim Dong-yong (KOR)	7:30.86
3rd place, bronze medalist(s)	Ryuta Arakawa (JPN)	7:35.29
4	Vladislav Yakovlev (KAZ)	7:39.39
5	Chan Chi Fung (HKG)	7:48.63
6	Dattu Baban Bhokanal (IND)	8:28.56
