= Tom Mackintosh =

New Zealand rower (born 1997)

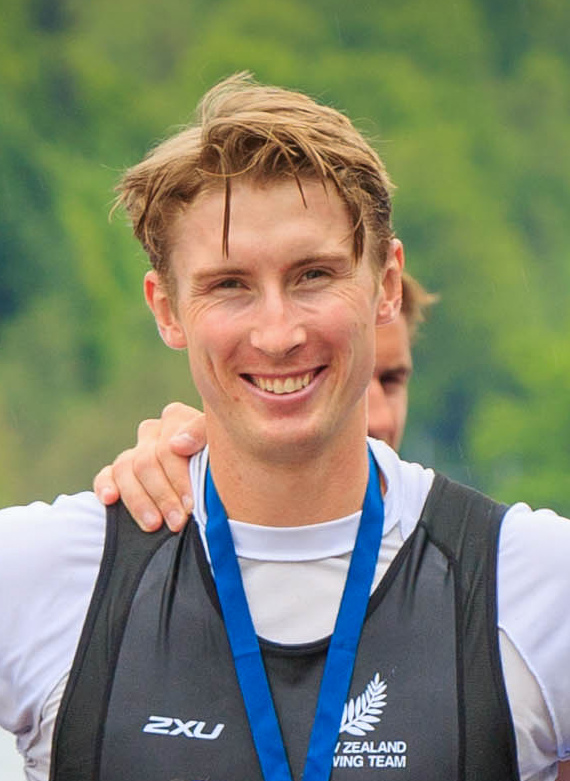
- Mackintosh in 2021

Personal information
- Full name: Thomas Mackintosh
- Born: 30 January 1997 (age 29) Wellington, New Zealand
- Height: 1.97 m (6 ft 6 in)

Sport
- Country: New Zealand
- Sport: Rowing
Medal record
Men's rowing
Representing New Zealand
Olympic Games
Gold medal – first place	2020 Tokyo	Eight
World Championships
Bronze medal – third place	2023 Belgrade	Single sculls

Thomas Mackintosh (born 30 January 1997) is a New Zealand rower. He is currently a single sculler, and is the reigning world bronze medal holder, a feat achieved in his debut season in the class. Mackintosh also won an Olympic gold medal in the sweep discipline, from his time in the eight at his Olympic debut at the Tokyo 2020 Summer Olympics. Off the water, Mackintosh is also a public speaker and entrepreneur.

== Early life, education and professional career ==
Mackintosh was born in 1997 in Wellington, New Zealand. His rowing career did not start until moving to Hastings, where he attended Lindisfarne College and joined the Hawke's Bay Rowing Club. He was motivated to start rowing by listening to his father's stories of representing New Zealand as a rower.

Mackintosh began tertiary education at the University of Canterbury, where he achieved a Bachelor of Commerce degree. Academically, he was a recipient of the Prime Minister's Scholarship in 2016 and 2018. He was also awarded the University of Canterbury Sportsman of the Year in 2018, and alongside fellow oarsmen George Howat, was a member of the University of Canterbury Sports Team of the Year in 2017. This study was balanced with Mackintosh's rowing career.

Subsequently, Mackintosh attended Massey University, where he achieved a Masters of Management extramurally, also while balancing his rowing career. During this time he was named Massey Distance sportsperson of the year for 2020 & 2021. Mackintosh was again a recipient of the Prime Minister's Scholarship in 2019, 2020, and 2021.

He later moved to Oxford University, becoming President of Oxford University Boat Club for 2025. Representing Oriel College Boat Club, he was part of the Oxford crew at The Boat Race 2025.

== World rowing career ==
Mackintosh's first World Championships appearance was the 2014 World Rowing Junior Championships in Hamburg, where he achieved a silver medal in the coxed four. After a break to focus on his university studies, he was selected in the 2016 New Zealand Under 21 Team that competed in a two-regatta series against Australia. He attended the 2017 World Rowing Under 23 Championships in the eight, placing seventh.

Mackintosh returned to the four in 2018, and enjoyed success in the boat across the following three years. At the 2018 World Rowing Under 23 Championships, he achieved a bronze medal as a member of the four, the first of several medals Mackintosh would achieve in a crew with Matt Macdonald. The young under 23 four was sent to the open 2018 World Rowing Championships for experience, placing 15th. Returning to the 2019 World Rowing Under 23 Championships, Mackintosh's crew bettered their previous performance by achieving a silver medal. Mackintosh was again selected in the four for the open World Rowing Championships in 2019, but this time in an open class boat, not the under 23s. The boat placed 14th.

Mackintosh then moved from the four to the eight. The class is not commonly competed in by New Zealand who, prior to the gold Mackintosh achieved at the Tokyo 2020 Summer Olympics, had not medalled in the event for 49 years. The crew's debut outing as an eight was the 2021 World Rowing Final Olympic Qualification Regatta, where they surprised the field to place first in their heat and first in the final. The team then went on to compete at the Tokyo 2020 Summer Olympics (held in 2021 due to Covid19). Although only placing second in their heat behind a fast Dutch crew, the crew placed first in the repechage showing good speed in choppy tailwind conditions. In the final, having rediscovered their rhythm famously termed "Big Boy Rhythm" by the team, the crew rowed through the field after a strong second 500m, and decisive third 500m to win gold. Mackintosh sat in the bow seat of the eight, behind Hamish Bond who was winning his third Olympic Gold following wins in the men's pair at London 2012 and Rio 2016.

Mackintosh then took a further break from rowing to focus on his studies again, but returned to the world stage in 2022, this time in the pair with fellow gold medalist Matt Macdonald. The duo had a strong start to their European tour, placing first in the 2022 World Rowing Cup II regatta. Next, the pair attending the Henley Royal Regatta, setting up a show down with the British men's pair, who had won the 2022 World Cup I Regatta. Both crews progressed to the final without major incident. After a poor start, caused by some steering issues and the fast starting British pair, Mackintosh and MacDonald stayed within touching distance before making a strong push from a length down to 3/4rds of a length up just before the Stewards Enclosure, holding on to win by the same margin. This was their crowning achievement in the season, becoming recipients of the Silver Goblets & Nickalls' Challenge Cup. The pair went on to place 4th in the 2022 World Rowing Cup III regatta, ultimately placing 6th at the 2022 World Rowing Championships.

In 2023, Mackintosh moved away from his success in the sweeps and returned to the sculling classes. This was a long hiatus, having not formally competed in the class since placing third in the under 17 single scull at the Maadi Cup as a schoolboy. His first competition in the class was the 2023 World Rowing Cup III, where he surprised a competitive field by placing first in his heat, with three times world champion Oliver Zeidler in second. Zeidler had his revenge in the semi final, where the order between him and Mackintosh was reversed. Mackintosh finished third in the final, behind Sverri Neilsen of Denmark in second and Zeidler in first.

At the 2023 World Rowing Champions in Belgrade, Serbia, the men's single scull field was the largest to date with 48 competitors. In the heat, Mackintosh came up against fellow newcomer Simon van Dorp from the Netherlands, with both scullers setting a strong pace with the quickest times of the day. Mackintosh progressed through the quarter final and semi final finishing 3rd in both races. In the final, Mackintosh placed third, earning a bronze medal behind Van Dorp in Silver and Zeidler in Gold. Zeidler the three times world champion, described the race on Instagram as "one of the fastest, toughest and most emotional of my career".

== Honours and awards ==
In 2021, Mackintosh was awarded Male Rower of the Year at the New Zealand Rowing Championships. He was also named the 2021 Hawkes Bay Senior Sportsperson of the year and has been a finalist in this category in 2022 & 2023.
