= Rowing at the 2026 Asian Games – Men's coxless pair =

Men's coxless pair at the 2026 Asian Games
- Venue: Nagaragawa International Regatta Course
- Date: 23–24 September 2026
- Competitors: 18 from 9 nations

Medalists
gold medal	Vladislav Yakovlev; Ivan Chernukhin	Kazakhstan
silver medal	Cao Chuang; Yang Mengshuai	China
bronze medal	Maksim Golubev; Alisher Turdiev	Uzbekistan

The men's coxless pair competition at the 2026 Asian Games was held from 23 to 24 September 2026 at the Nagaragawa International Regatta Course, Gifu, Japan.

== Schedule ==
All times are Japan Standard Time (UTC+09:00)

Date	Time	Event
Wednesday, 23 September 2026	10:10	Heats
Thursday, 24 September 2026	10:00	Finals

== Results ==
=== Heats ===
- Qualification: 1–2 + next 2 fastest → Final A (FA), Rest → Final B (FB)

==== Heat 1 ====
Rank	Team	Time	Notes
1	Uzbekistan (UZB); Maksim Golubev; Alisher Turdiev	6:26.69	FA
2	Indonesia (INA); Asuhan Pattiiha; Ferdiansyah	6:32.26	FA
3	Hong Kong (HKG); Wong Ching; Chen Pak Hong	6:33.60	FA
4	Vietnam (VIE); Trần Dương Nghĩa; Nguyễn Phú	6:35.39	FB
5	Philippines (PHI); Rynjie Peñaredondo; Van Maxilom	7:06.69	FB

==== Heat 2 ====
Rank	Team	Time	Notes
1	Kazakhstan (KAZ); Vladislav Yakovlev; Ivan Chernukhin	6:20.89	FA
2	China (CHN); Cao Chuang; Yang Mengshuai	6:22.01	FA
3	South Korea (KOR); Moon Jong-won; Kang Min-seong	6:34.38	FA
4	India (IND); Jaswinder Singh; Nitin Kumar	6:36.90	FB

=== Finals ===
==== Final B ====
Rank	Team	Time
1	India (IND); Jaswinder Singh; Nitin Kumar	6:46.84
2	Philippines (PHI); Rynjie Peñaredondo; Van Maxilom	7:06.94
3	Vietnam (VIE); Trần Dương Nghĩa; Nguyễn Phú	7:13.94

==== Final A ====
Rank	Team	Time
1st place, gold medalist(s)	Kazakhstan (KAZ); Vladislav Yakovlev; Ivan Chernukhin	6:25.13
2nd place, silver medalist(s)	China (CHN); Cao Chuang; Yang Mengshuai	6:27.22
3rd place, bronze medalist(s)	Uzbekistan (UZB); Maksim Golubev; Alisher Turdiev	6:32.34
4	South Korea (KOR); Moon Jong-won; Kang Min-seong	6:40.34
5	Hong Kong (HKG); Wong Ching; Chen Pak Hong	6:41.56
6	Indonesia (INA); Asuhan Pattiiha; Ferdiansyah	7:40.71
