= Cris Nievarez =

Filipino rower (born 2000)

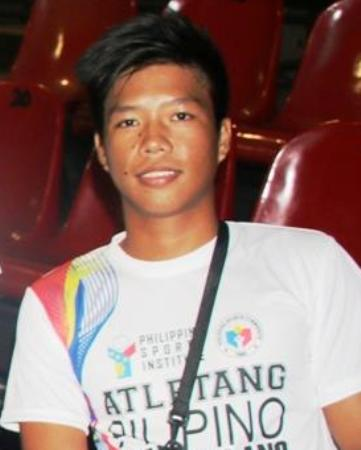
- Nievarez in 2017

Personal information
- Nationality: Filipino
- Born: April 4, 2000 (age 26)
- Home town: Atimonan, Quezon
- Height: 1.81 m (5 ft 11 in)

Sport
- Country: Philippines
- Sport: Rowing
- Event: Single sculls
- Coached by: Edgardo Maerina; Shuhrat Ganiev
Medal record
Representing Philippines
Men's rowing
Southeast Asian Games
Gold medal – first place	2019 Philippines	Lightweight single sculls
Silver medal – second place	2021 Vietnam	Lightweight double sculls
Bronze medal – third place	2021 Vietnam	Lightweight single sculls
Bronze medal – third place	2025 Thailand	Single sculls

Cris Marasigan Nievarez (born April 4, 2000) is a Filipino rower who competes for the Philippines in international rowing competition. He has qualified to compete in the 2020 Summer Olympics in Tokyo, Japan.

== Career ==
=== Early years ===
A native of Atimonan, Quezon, Cris Nievarez was born to a father who worked as a land caretaker and a mother who is a homemaker. He is the youngest of three children. In his childhood, Nievarez played basketball and competed in track and field athletics. He took up the sports at grade 7 and was contented to compete in the Palarong Pambansa, the national student-athlete competition in the Philippines. In athletics, he competed in the 400-meter sprint.

Nievarez took up rowing around 2015. Fellow Atimonan native Justine Viñas, invited him to try for a spot in the national rowing team. He was able to secure a spot following three months of training near the La Mesa Dam in Quezon City. He was 15 years old when he joined the national rowing team.

=== 2019 Southeast Asian Games ===
Nievarez competed at the 2019 Southeast Asian Games which was hosted by the Philippines. He clinched the gold medal in the men's lightweight single sculls event after clocking 7 minutes and 34.27 seconds besting Siripong Chaiwichitchonkul of Thailand and Kakan Kusmana of Indonesia who won silver and bronze, respectively.

=== 2020 Summer Olympics ===
Cris Nievarez qualified for the 2020 Summer Olympics in Tokyo which was postponed for a year due to the COVID-19 pandemic. He qualified by placing ninth in the 2021 World Rowing Asia Oceania Continental Qualification Regatta in Tokyo and earned one of the five berths available for that qualifier. Rowers who placed fourth to eighth already qualified for the Olympics, allowing Nievarez to earn a spot in the games. He will be the third rower to represent the Philippines in the Olympics, with the last competitor being Benjie Tolentino who took part in the 2000 Summer Olympics in Sydney. In preparation for the games, Nievarez worked by Uzbek coach Shuhrat Ganiev. Ganiev mostly conducted Nievarez's training virtually due to the pandemic. Nievarez targets to finish within the top six in his event.

Nievarez was drawn to compete in Heat 5 in the men's single sculls event. He finished third among five rowers, qualifying for the quarterfinal round. He clocked 7:22.97 finishing behind Damir Martin of Croatia (7:09.17) and Alexander Vyazovkin of the ROC team (7:14.95). In the semifinal, Nievarez finished fifth, which meant that he is no longer in contention to win a medal. He progressed to the semifinal C/D to determine his final placing.

=== Post-2020 Olympics ===
Niavarez competed at the 2022 Asian Rowing Virtual Indoor Championships where he clinch a silver medal in the men's under-23 2,000m event.
