= Jan Fleissner =

Czech rower

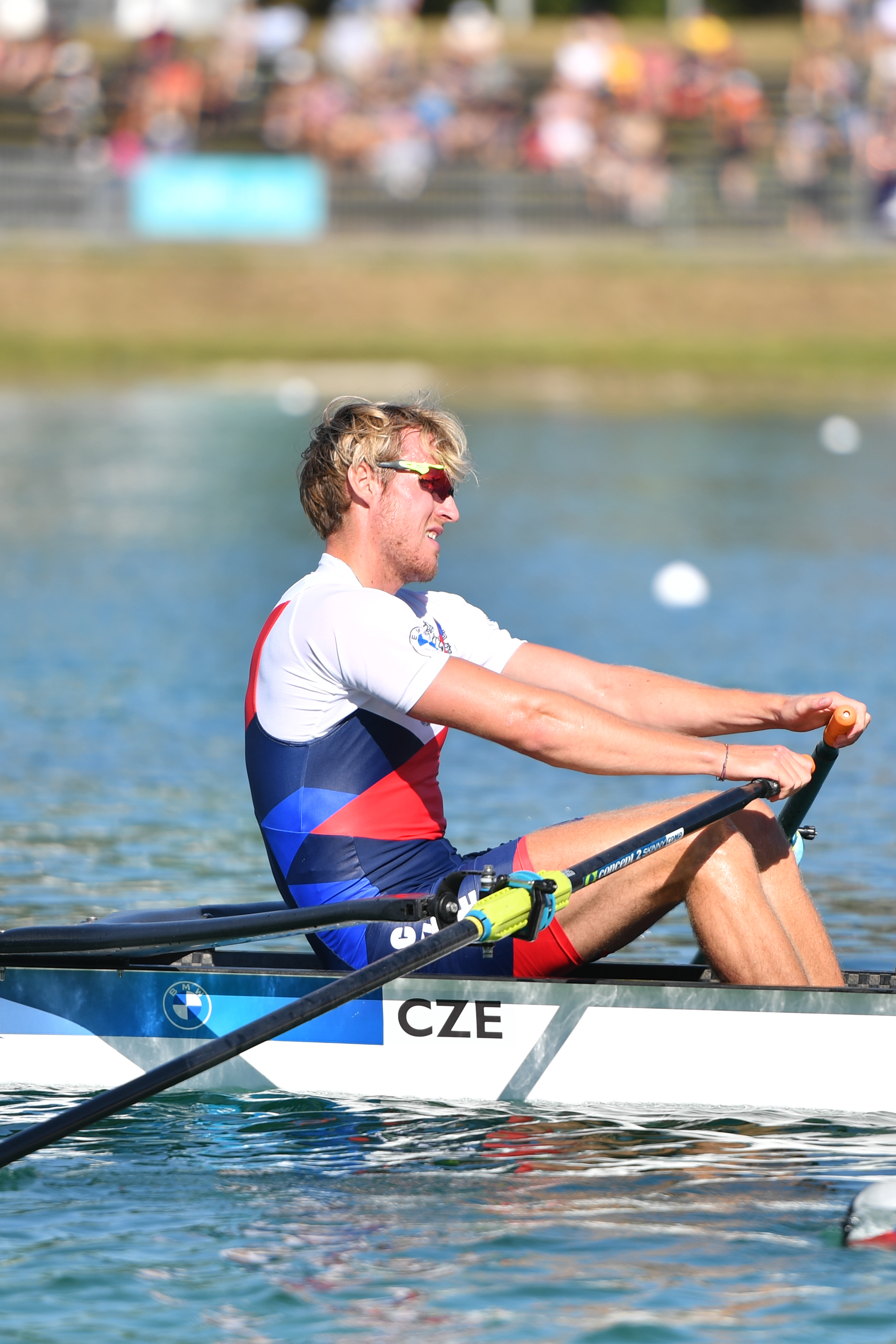

Personal information
- Nationality: Czech Republic
- Born: 1 February 1998 (age 28) Prague, Czech Republic
- Height: 1.88 m (6 ft 2 in)

Sport
- Sport: Rowing

Jan Fleissner (born 1 February 1998) is a Czech rower. He competed in the 2020 Summer Olympics.
