= Ignacio Vásquez (rower) =

Dominican Republic rower

Personal information
- Full name: Ignacio Vásquez Jorge
- Nationality: Dominican Republic
- Born: 4 December 1998 (age 27) Bonao, Dominican Republic

Sport
- Sport: Rowing

Ignacio Vásquez Jorge (born 4 December 1998) is a rower from the Dominican Republic. He competed in the 2020 Summer Olympics.
