= Félix Potoy =

Nicaraguan rower

Personal information
- Nationality: Nicaragua
- Born: 15 March 1995 (age 30); Managua

Sport
- Sport: Rowing

Félix Potoy (born 15 March 1995) is a Nicaraguan rower. He competed in the 2020 Summer Olympics.
