= Jordan Parry =

New Zealand rower

Personal information
- Born: 5 October 1995 (age 31) Tauranga, New Zealand
- Height: 189 cm (6 ft 2 in)

Sport
- Country: New Zealand
- Sport: Rowing
- Club: Tauranga Rowing Club
Medal record
Men's rowing
Representing New Zealand
World U23 Championships
Gold medal – first place	2017 Plovdiv	Men's quad sculls
Silver medal – second place	2015 Plovdiv	Men's quad sculls
Silver medal – second place	2016 Rotterdam	Men's quad sculls

Jordan Parry (born 5 October 1995), known as Paz in rowing circles, is a New Zealand rower who represented New Zealand in the men's single sculls at the 2020 Summer Olympics in Tokyo.

Parry was born in 1995. He grew up in Tauranga and attended Tauranga Boys' College, where he started rowing in 2010. He is a member of the Tauranga Rowing Club.

He first represented New Zealand as a U21 rower in 2014 as a member of the trans-Tasman team. Over the 2014/15 summer, he trained at the Waikato Rowing Performance Centre and gained selection to the U23 quad sculls team. At the 2015 World Rowing U23 Championships in Plovdiv, Bulgaria, the team won silver. In the same boat class but with two new team members, he again won silver at the 2016 World Rowing U23 Championships in Rotterdam, Netherlands. At the 2017 World Rowing U23 Championships, again held in Plovdiv, he won gold; Jack O'Leary was the other team member from the 2016 crew.

In the 2018 season, Parry rowed for the New Zealand men's elite. As a member of the quad, he came fifth at the 2018 World Rowing Cup II and won the B-final at the 2018 World Rowing Cup III. At the 2018 World Rowing Championships in Plovdiv, he was a reserve rower and did not get to compete. In the 2019 season, he was a reserve rower for the quad but got to compete 2019 World Rowing Cup II as he replaced an injured crew member; they won bronze at the event. At the 2019 World Rowing Cup III, he was part of the team that won silver. At the 2019 World Rowing Championships in Ottensheim, Austria, the team came third in the B-final. Due to the COVID-19 pandemic, Parry did not attend any international rowing competitions during 2020.

At club level, Parry has rowed in the single scull for some years. Early in 2021, he dominated the New Zealand Olympic trials and displaced Mahé Drysdale as New Zealand's representative.
