= Alex Rossi (rower) =

Australian rower

Alexander Rossi
Personal information
- Nationality: Australian
- Born: 5 July 2001 (age 25)

Sport
- Country: Australia
- Sport: Rowing
Medal record
Men's rowing
Representing Australia
U23 World Championships
| Bronze medal – third place | 2023 Plovdiv | Quad-scull |

Alexander Rossi (born 5 July 2001) is an Australian representative rower. He was a medallist at the 2023 U23 World Championships and made the Australian senior squad for the 2023 World Rowing Championships, racing as Australia's single sculling entrant.

== Club and state rowing ==
Rossi's was educated at Trinity College, Perth where he took up rowing. His senior club rowing has been with West Australian Rowing Club in Perth.

He first made West Australian state selection in the 2020 youth eight, which was selected but did not race that year at the pandemic-affected Interstate Regatta. In 2021 he was again selected in the West Australian youth eight which competed for the Noel Wilkinson Trophy at the Interstate Regatta within the Australian Rowing Championships. In 2022 he was selected in the Western Australian men's senior eight to contest the King's Cup - that crew took the bronze. He made another King's Cup selection for Western Australia in 2023.

== International representative rowing ==
Rossi's Australian representative debut came in 2019 when he was selected in a coxed four to contest the Junior World Rowing Championships in Tokyo. They finished in fifth place.

In 2023, he was selected in the Australian U23 quad scull to contest the U23 World Championships. With Rossi in the stroke seat, that crew won a bronze medal. On the back of the bronze win at the U23 championships, Rossi was called in as Australia's sculling spare to the senior squad for the 2023 World Rowing Championships in Belgrade, Serbia. He was selected to contest the men's single scull. He placed third in his heat but then won his repechage to qualify for the A/B semifinals. Ultimately, he finished 3rd in the C final for an overall 15th-place world ranking from the regatta.
