= Kjetil Borch =

Norwegian rower (born 1990)

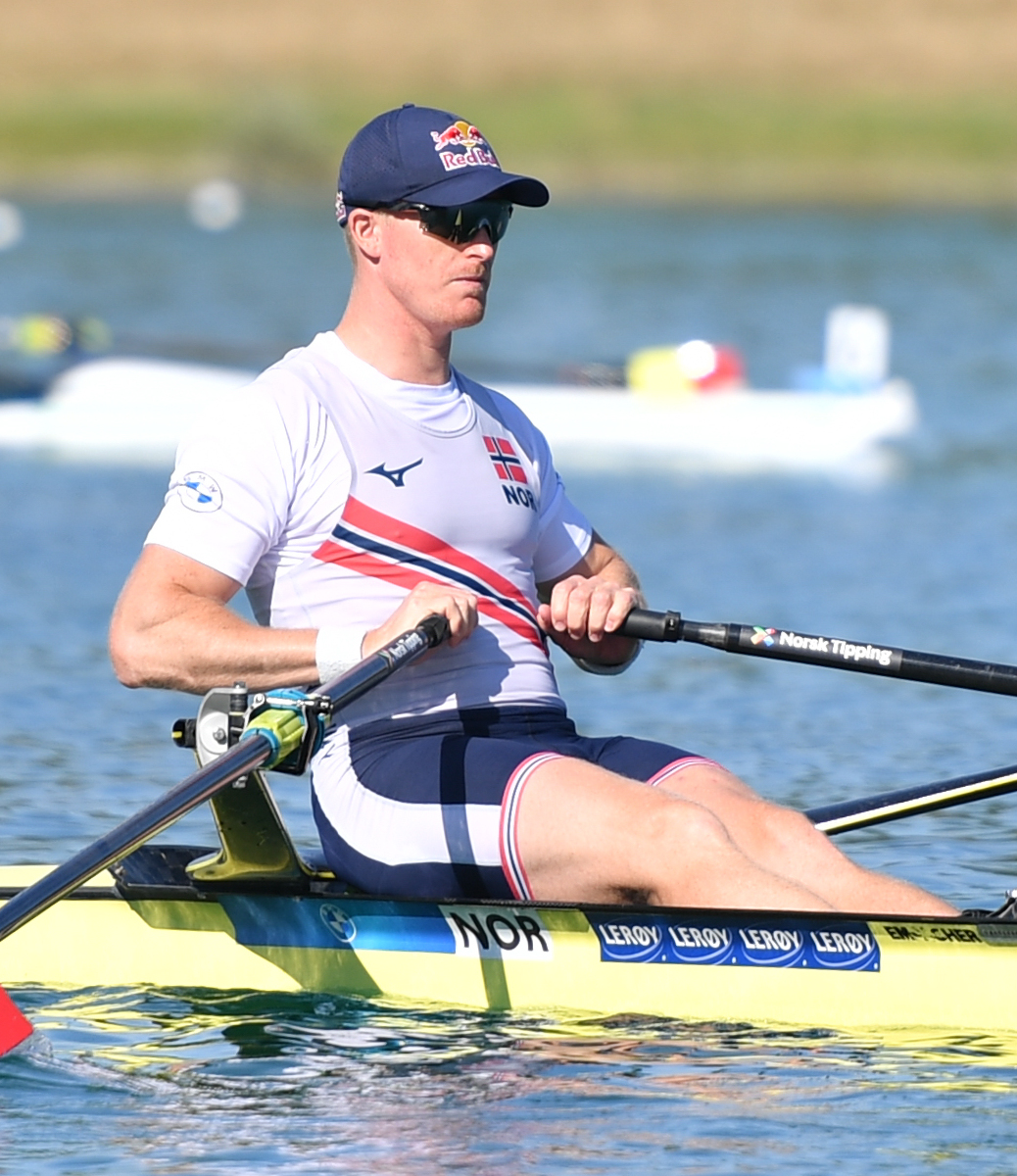
- Borch in 2022

Personal information
- Nationality: Norwegian
- Born: 14 February 1990 (age 36) Tønsberg, Norway
- Height: 1.93 m (6 ft 4 in)
- Weight: 95 kg (209 lb)

Sport
- Country: Norway
- Sport: Rowing
- Event: Single sculls
- Club: Horten RK
Medal record
Men's rowing
Representing Norway
Olympic Games
Silver medal – second place	2020 Tokyo	Single sculls
Bronze medal – third place	2016 Rio de Janeiro	Double sculls
World Championships
Gold medal – first place	2013 Chungju	Double sculls
Gold medal – first place	2018 Plovdiv	Single sculls
Bronze medal – third place	2019 Ottensheim	Single sculls
European Championships
Gold medal – first place	2018 Glasgow	Single sculls
Bronze medal – third place	2012 Varese	Double sculls
Bronze medal – third place	2013 Seville	Double sculls
Bronze medal – third place	2020 Poznań	Single sculls
World Rowing Cup
Gold medal – first place	2012 Oberschleißheim	Double sculls
Silver medal – second place	2017 Poznań	Double sculls
Silver medal – second place	2019 Rotterdam	Single sculls
Silver medal – second place	2021 Zagreb	Single sculls
Bronze medal – third place	2021 Lucerne	Single sculls
World U23 Championships
Bronze medal – third place	2009 Račice	Double sculls

Kjetil Borch (born 14 February 1990) is a Norwegian rower. He is a two-time Olympic medallist and won the silver medal in the single sculls at the 2020 Summer Olympics and the bronze medal in the double sculls at the 2016 Summer Olympics. Borch is also a two-time world champion (2013, 2018) and a European champion (2018). He is a four-time Olympian and competed at the 2012, 2016, 2020, and 2024 Olympic Games.

== Rowing career ==
Borch began rowing in 2001, before taking a break to play handball and train kickboxing, and then later returned to rowing. He made his international debut for Norway in the quad scull at the World Junior Championships in Beijing in 2007 and later switched to the double scull with Bjørn Jostein Singstad for the 2008 World Junior Championships in Ottensheim. In 2009, Borch won the bronze medal in the double sculls at the World U23 Championships in Račice with Truls Albert in bow seat. In 2010, Borch became part of the Norwegian senior men's squad and partnered with Nils Jakob Hoff. The pair placed fourth in the double sculls event at the 2010 World Championships in Cambridge and won the bronze medal at the 2012 European Championships in Varese.

Borch made his Olympic debut at the 2012 Summer Olympics in London, where he finished in overall seventh place in the men's double sculls with Hoff. The pair won the bronze medal at the 2013 European Championships in Seville and the gold medal at the 2013 World Championships in Chungju. After placing tenth at the 2014 World Championships and twelfth at the 2015 World Championships with Hoff, Borch partnered with two-time Olympic champion Olaf Tufte in 2016. The duo won the bronze medal in the men's double sculls at the 2016 Summer Olympics in Rio de Janeiro.

After placing fifth at the 2017 World Championships, Borch moved into the single scull in 2018. That same year, he won the gold medal at the European Championships in Glasgow and the World Championships in Plovdiv. Borch won the bronze medal at the 2019 World Championships and the 2020 European Championships. He was selected to represent Norway at the 2020 Summer Olympics and won the silver medal in the men's single sculls in Tokyo.

Borch placed fifth in the men's single sculls at the 2022 World Championships. He competed in the men's double sculls with Martin Helseth at the 2024 Summer Olympics in Paris, where the pair finished in overall tenth place.
