= Vladislav Yakovlev (rower) =

Kazakhstani rower (born 1993)

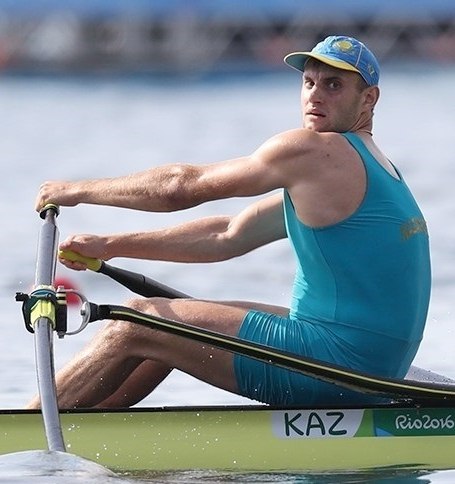
- Yakovlev at the 2016 Olympics

Personal information
- Born: 1 January 1993 (age 33) Temirtau, Kazakhstan
- Education: Karaganda State University
- Height: 188 cm (6 ft 2 in)
- Weight: 85 kg (187 lb)

Sport
- Sport: Rowing
- Club: Temirtau School of Rowing
- Coached by: Anna Belonogova; Vladimir Belonogov; Aleksandr Usachev
Medal record
Men's rowing
Representing Kazakhstan
Asian Games
| Gold medal – first place | 2026 Aichi–Nagoya | Pair |
| Bronze medal – third place | 2014 Incheon | Quadruple sculls |

Vladislav Pavlovich Yakovlev (Russian: Владислав Павлович Яковлев, born 1 January 1993) is a Kazakh rower, who competed in single sculls at the Summer Olympics in 2012 (28th place), 2016 (31st place), 2020 (19th place), and 2024 (25th place with a time of 6:59.43).

He also competed at the Asian Games in 2010 (lightweight single sculls and lightweight double sculls), 2014 (double sculls and quadruple sculls), 2018 (single sculls), and 2022 (single sculls).
