= Mohamed Taieb =

Tunisian rower (born 1996)

Personal information
- Born: October 15, 1996 (age 29)

Sport
- Country: Tunisia
- Sport: Rowing

Mohamed Taieb (born October 15, 1996) is a Tunisian rower. He placed 27th in the men's single sculls event at the 2016 Summer Olympics.
