= Husein Alireza =

Saudi rower (born 1993)

Personal information
- Full name: Husein Ali Alireza
- Nationality: Saudi
- Born: 27 August 1993 (age 32) London
- Height: 1.93 m (6 ft 4 in)

Sport
- Country: Saudi Arabia
- Sport: Rowing
- Event: Single Sculls
- College team: Hughes Hall, Cambridge
- Club: Tideway Scullers School

Husein Alireza (Arabic: حسين علي رضا; born 27 August 1993) is a Saudi rower. He competed in the 2020 Summer Olympics., reaching the quarterfinals.
