= Robbie Manson =

New Zealand rower

Personal information
- Full name: Robert Manson
- Born: 11 October 1989 (age 37) Hamilton, New Zealand
- Height: 189 cm (6 ft 2 in)
- Weight: 87 kg (192 lb)
Medal record
Men's rowing
Representing New Zealand
World Championships
Bronze medal – third place	2015 Aiguebelette-le-Lac	Double sculls
Gold medal – first place	2017 Poznań, Poland	Single sculls
World U23 Championships
Gold medal – first place	2009 Račice	Double sculls

Robert W. Manson (born 11 October 1989) is a New Zealand rower.

Manson was born in 1989. He is from a family of rowers, with his father Greg the singles lightweight national champion in 1985, and his brother Karl also competing internationally.

He won a bronze medal at the 2015 World Rowing Championships. At the 2017 New Zealand rowing nationals at Lake Ruataniwha, he partnered with Chris Harris in the men's double sculls and they became national champions. Manson also became single sculls national champion, aided by the absence of both Mahé Drysdale and Hamish Bond.

In 2014, Manson came out as gay being one of the first LGBT persons in rowing from New Zealand.

In 2017, Manson won the men's single sculls at the World Rowing Cup II in Poznań, Poland, setting a new world best time of 6:30.74, beating Mahé Drysdale's record by 3 seconds. As of March 2026, that time still stands as the world's best.

On 20 October 2020, Manson announced his retirement from rowing. After coaching in New Zealand, Manson returned to club rowing in 2022, and won the New Zealand men's double sculls national title in 2023. He returned to international racing later that year, competing in the men's double sculls, where he qualified the boat for the 2024 Olympics with Ben Mason.

Manson credited his OnlyFans account, on which he posts "thirst traps," with boosting his athletic performance.

== See also ==
- Homosexuality in modern sports
