= Abdulrahman Al-Fadhel =

Kuwaiti rower (born 1994)

Personal information
- Nationality: Kuwait
- Born: 9 July 1994 (age 30); Kuwait City

Sport
- Sport: Rowing

Abdulrahman Al-Fadhel (born 9 July 1994) is a Kuwaiti rower. He competed in the 2020 Summer Olympics.
