= Rio Rii =

Vanuatuan rower

Personal information
- Full name: Riilio Rii
- Born: 22 June 1994 (age 30); Port Vila, Vanuatu
- Height: 1.76 m (5 ft 9 in)
- Weight: 79 kg (174 lb)

Sport
- Country: Vanuatu
- Sport: Rowing
- Event: Men's Single Sculls

Riilio "Rio" Rii (born 22 June 1994) is a Ni-Van rower. He was the flagbearer of Vanuatu at the 2020 Summer Olympics in Tokyo, earning attention for his shirtless, oiled get-up compared to Tongan fighter Pita Taufatofua. In the men's single sculls race, Rii finished 30th overall.

== Career ==
He started in the sport at 19, having taken up cricket before, and has won a gold medal at the Commonwealth Rowing Championships, as well as appearing at three World Rowing Championships.
