= Stephen Cox (rower) =

Zimbabwean rower (born 1991)

Personal information
- Nationality: Zimbabwean
- Born: September 29, 1991 (age 33); Harare, Zimbabwe

Sport
- Sport: Rowing
- Event: Single sculls

Stephen Cox (born 29 September 1991) is a Zimbabwean rower. He competed in the single sculls at the 2024 Summer Olympics.

Cox is a corporal in the British Army. He attended Peterhouse Boys' School.
