= Onat Kazaklı =

Turkish rower

Personal information
- Born: 9 May 1993 (age 32) Istanbul, Turkey
- Height: 1.88 m (6 ft 2 in)

Sport
- Country: Turkey
- Sport: Rowing
- Club: Fenerbahçe Rowing

Onat Kazaklı (born 9 May 1993) is a Turkish rower competing in the single sculls event. He obtained a quota for the 2020 Summer Olympics.

The 1.88 m (6 ft 2 in) tall athlete is a member of Fenerbahçe Rowing. He competed at the 2010 Summer Youth Olympics, and the 2019 World Rowing Championships.
