= Nico Stahlberg =

Swiss rower

Personal information
- Born: 15 November 1991 (age 34)

Sport
- Sport: Rowing

Nico Stahlberg (born 15 November 1991) is a Swiss rower. He competed in the men's quadruple sculls event at the 2012 and 2016 Summer Olympics.
