= Aleksandar Aleksandrov (rower) =

Azerbaijani rower (born 1990)

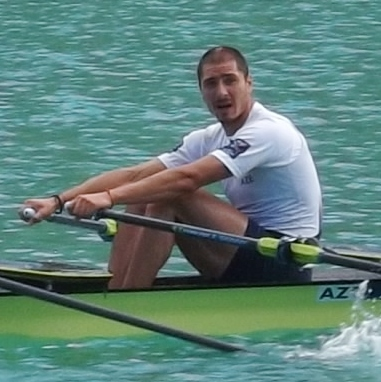
- Aleksandrov in 2015

Personal information
- Born: 9 April 1990 (age 36) Sofia, Bulgaria
Medal record
Men's rowing
Representing Azerbaijan
European Championships
Silver medal – second place	2014 Belgrade	Double scull
Bronze medal – third place	2007 Poznań	Single scull

Aleksandar Aleksandrov (Bulgarian: Александър Александров, born 9 April 1990 in Sofia) is an Azerbaijani rower of Bulgarian descent.

== Career ==
For Azerbaijan, Aleksandrov won the U23 World Rowing title in the men's single sculls in 2012, having won silver in the same event in 2010. He also won the junior world title in the men's single scull in 2007 and 2008, having won silver in 2006 (all rowing for Bulgaria).

He finished 5th in the single sculls at the 2012 Summer Olympics and 12th in the double sculls with Boris Yotov at the 2016 Summer Olympics.

In 2013, he won the Diamond Challenge Sculls (the premier event for single sculls) at the Henley Royal Regatta.

With Yotov, he won the silver medal at the 2014 European Championships in the men's double sculls. He had previously won a bronze medal in the single scull at the 2007 European Championship while rowing for Bulgaria.
