= Dara Alizadeh =

American rower (born 1993)

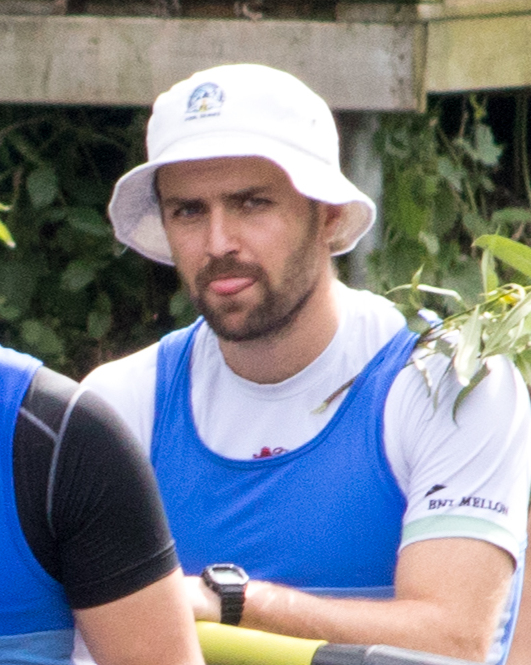

Personal information
- Born: August 27, 1993 (age 32) Brookline, Massachusetts, U.S.
- Education: University of Pennsylvania; Hughes Hall, Cambridge

Sport
- Country: Bermuda
- Sport: Rowing
- Event: Men's single sculls
- Club: Belmont Hill School; University of Pennsylvania; Cambridge University Boat Club

Dara Alizadeh (born 27 August 1993 in Brookline, Massachusetts) is a Bermudian and American rower who represents Bermuda.

His father is Iranian, and his mother is British-born Bermudian. The couple then met while studying at Tufts University in Massachusetts. Alizadeh began rowing at Belmont Hill School, and continued at the University of Pennsylvania, graduating in 2015 with an undergraduate degree in economics. He pursued a graduate degree in education at Hughes Hall, Cambridge, racing in the Cambridge Blue Boat in the 2018 and 2019 Oxford-Cambridge Boat Races, winning in both years and serving as Cambridge President in 2019.

He represented Bermuda at 2020 Summer Games, in the men's single sculls.

He was the flagbearer for Bermuda at the opening ceremony of the Tokyo Games.

Olympic Games
| Preceded by Tucker Murphy | Flagbearer for Bermuda; Tokyo 2020 | Succeeded by Adriana Penruddocke; Jah-Nhai Perinchief |
