= Ryuta Arakawa =

Japanese rower (born 1994)

Ryūta Arakawa
Personal information
- Nationality: Japan
- Born: 3 August 1994 (age 31) Yokohama, Japan
- Height: 1.86 m (6 ft 1 in)

Sport
- Sport: Rowing
Medal record
Men's rowing
Representing Japan
Asian Games
Silver medal – second place	2022 Hangzhou	Single sculls
Bronze medal – third place	2018 Jakarta–Palembang	Single sculls

Ryūta Arakawa (荒川龍太, Arakawa Ryūta, born 3 August 1994) is a Japanese rower. Born in Yokohama, Kanagawa Prefecture, he graduated from Hitotsubashi University Faculty of Law in 2017. He is a member of NTT East Rowing Club.

He won a bronze medal in the single scull representing Japan at the 2018 Asian Games. He represented Japan in the single scull at the 2020 Summer Olympics, finishing sixth in the second semifinal. He won a silver medal at the 2022 Asian Games.
