= Abdelkhalek El-Banna =

Egyptian rower (born 1988)

Personal information
- Nationality: Egyptian
- Born: 4 July 1988 (age 38) Tanta, Egypt

Sport
- Sport: Rowing

Abdelkhalek El-Banna (born 4 July 1988) is an Egyptian competitive rower.

He competed at the 2016 Summer Olympics in Rio de Janeiro, in the men's single sculls, placing in 10th. He also competed at the 2020 Summer Olympics in Tokyo, finishing 14th in the men's single sculls.
