= Sverri Sandberg Nielsen =

Faroese-Danish rower

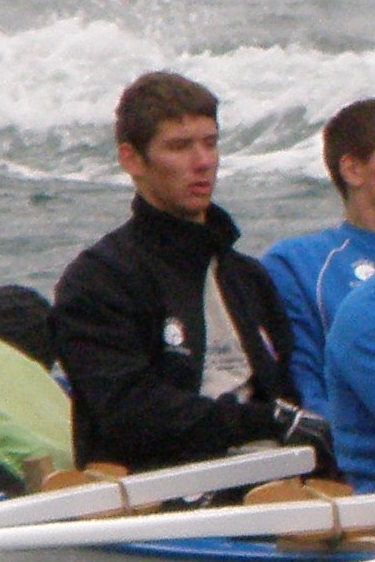

Personal information
- Nationality: Faroese
- Born: 14 October 1993 (age 32) Tórshavn, Faroe Islands
- Height: 1.93 m (6 ft 4 in)
- Weight: 95 kg (209 lb)

Sport
- Country: Denmark
- Sport: Rowing
- Event: Single sculls
- Club: Danske Studenters Roklub
Medal record
Representing Denmark
Men's rowing
World Championships
Silver medal – second place	2019 Ottensheim	Single sculls
European Championships
Gold medal – first place	2020 Poznan	Single sculls
Silver medal – second place	2021 Varese	Single sculls

Sverri Sandberg Nielsen (born 14 October 1993) is a Faroese rower who competes for Danske Studenters Roklub and Denmark in the heavyweight single sculls. He also competes in indoor rowing and has set a new Danish record three years in a row, 2015, 2016 and 2017 and again in 2019 and 2020. In 2019 he won silver medal at the World Rowing Championships. In 2020 he won the European Rowing Championship and the following year he won silver at the same event. In 2021 he competed for Denmark at the 2020 Summer Olympics. He also competes for Denmark at the 2024 Summer Olympics.

== Career ==
Sverri S. Nielsen began his rowing career in the Faroe Islands competing in Faroese wooden rowing boats with 6 or 8 rowers and a cox; he was also training indoor rowing in the Faroe Islands as well as outdoor rowing. In 2011 he won the C.R.A.S.H.-B.Sprints World Indoor Rowing Championships for Junior Men. He is a member of the Danish National rowing team, he currently competes in Single sculler, heavy weight, he has also competed in double sculler.

=== Results in Indoor Rowing – Danish record holder ===
Nielsen is the current Danish record holder in the men's indoor rowing, heavy weight, he broke a nine-year old Danish record in January 2015 and improved the same record in January 2016 in the time 5.51.6 and again in January 2017 in the time 5:49.20, and in February 2017 at the European Indoor Rowing Championship, which he won in the time 5:47.9.

=== Results in single scull ===
Nielsen competed at the 2015 World Rowing Championships making it to the semi-final; he competed at the 2015 World Rowing Championship under-23 and made it to the final where his final result was number four. At the 2017 World Rowing Championships he made it to the semi-finals, where he was number four in the time 06:53.420.

==== Missed Olympic 2016 qualification ====
He missed the Olympic qualification for the 2016 Summer Olympics by less than one second, when he came in as number four at the final qualification race for the Olympics. Denmark and all other nations were not allowed to have more than two boats in the men's and women's single sculler and double lightweight sculler. But because or the new rule of diversity, Denmark gained another place for one of their boat for the 2016 Summer Olympics in Rio; this happened when Belgium won two competition in the men's single and double scullers at the final qualification race, but were only allowed to take one of the two boats to Rio. It was therefore up Belgium to decide, whether Denmark should have the men's single sculler or double sculler to the Olympics. Belgium chose to take their single sculler, and therefore Sverri Nielsen could not compete at the Olympics 2016, instead the extra place went to Mads Rasmussen and Rasmus Quist.

==== Summer Olympics 2020 ====
Nielsen won heat three and advanced to the quarterfinals. He was the fastest in quarterfinal two and advanced to the semifinals. Nielsen was fourth at the final and he missed the bronze medal just for 0.15 seconds.

==== Summer Olympics 2024 ====
Nielsen won heat six and advanced to the quarterfinals.

== Honour ==
- 2019 – Faroese Sportsperson of the Year
