= Mindaugas Griškonis =

Lithuanian rower (born 1986)

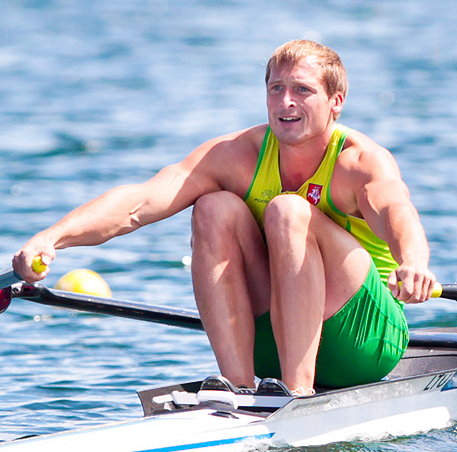
- Griškonis in 2014

Personal information
- Born: 17 January 1986 (age 40) Vilnius, Lithuanian SSR, Soviet Union
- Height: 189 cm (6 ft 2 in)
- Weight: 91 kg (201 lb)

Sport
- Sport: Rowing
Medal record
Representing Lithuania
Olympic Games
Silver medal – second place	2016 Rio de Janeiro	Double sculls
World Championships
Bronze medal – third place	2015 Aiguebelette	Single sculls
Bronze medal – third place	2018 Plovdiv	Single sculls
European Championships
Gold medal – first place	2009 Brest	Single sculls
Gold medal – first place	2011 Plovdiv	Single sculls
Gold medal – first place	2012 Varese	Single sculls
Silver medal – second place	2007 Poznań	Single sculls
Silver medal – second place	2016 Brandenburg	Single sculls
Silver medal – second place	2018 Glasgow	Single sculls
Bronze medal – third place	2014 Belgrade	Single sculls

Mindaugas Griškonis (born 17 January 1986) is a former Lithuanian rower, president of Lithuanian rowing federation. Competing in the single sculls he won six medals at the European and world championships between 2007 and 2015, including three European gold medals. He placed eighth at the 2008 and 2012 Olympics, before getting his first Olympic medal in the double scull event in 2016, a silver with Saulius Ritter.

After the 2024 Summer Olympics, Griškonis declared his retirement from the sport and was approved as the General Secretary of the Lithuanian National Olympic Committee.

In 2021 Griškonis elected as president of Lithuanian Rowing Federation. In 2025 he was reelected for second term.

Awards
Preceded by Danas Rapšys	Lithuanian Sportsman of the Year; 2021	Succeeded by Mykolas Alekna
