= Aleksandr Vyazovkin =

Russian rower

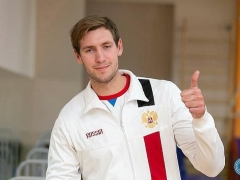
- Portrait of Aleksandr Vyazovkin (2021)

Personal information
- Full name: Aleksandr Alekseyevich Vyazovkin
- Nationality: Russia
- Born: 9 April 1997 (age 28) Tolyatti

Sport
- Sport: Rowing

Aleksandr Alekseyevich Vyazovkin (Russian: Александр Алексеевич Вязовкин; born 9 April 1997) is a Russian rower.

He competed in the 2020 Summer Olympics in the single sculls as a neutral athlete and became fifth in the A final. In the 2023 World Championships, Vyazovkin became first in the E final (25th in the overall ranking).
