= Bendegúz Pétervári-Molnár =

Hungarian rower

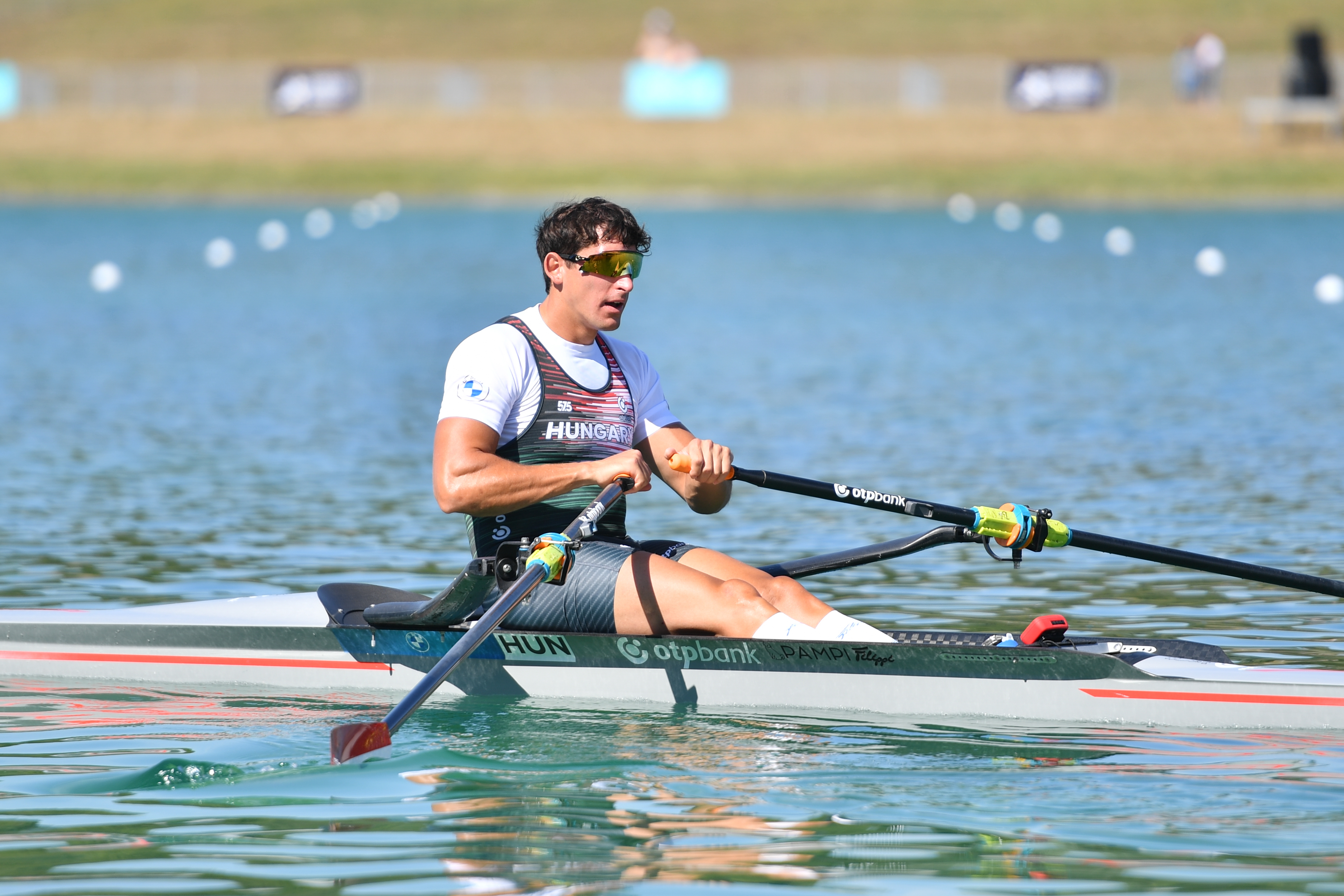
Pétervári-Molnár at the 2022 European Championships in Munich

Bendegúz Pétervári-Molnár (born 14 March 1993 in Budapest) is a Hungarian rower.

Pétervári-Molnár was born in 1993. His father, the Olympic rower Zoltán Molnár, is his coach. His uncle, Pál Pétervári, has represented Hungary in sprint canoe at world championships.

Pétervári-Molnár placed 14th in the men's single sculls event at the 2016 Summer Olympics, and 10th at the 2020 Tokyo Olympics in men's single sculls.
