= Privel Hinkati =

French-Beninese rower

Privel Hinkati (born 8 December 1988 in Caen) is a French rower representing Benin.

He won the bronze medal at the 2017 African Championships in Tunis. By finishing 5th at the sculls final during the 2019 African Championships, he became the first Beninese rower to qualify for the Olympics, the 2020 Summer Olympics.

At the 2020 Summer Olympics, he placed 27th in men's single sculls.

Olympic Games
Preceded by Yémi Apithy	Flag bearer for Benin; 2020 Tokyo with Nafissath Radji	Succeeded by Valentin Houinato; Noélie Yarigo
