= Quentin Antognelli =

Monegasque rower

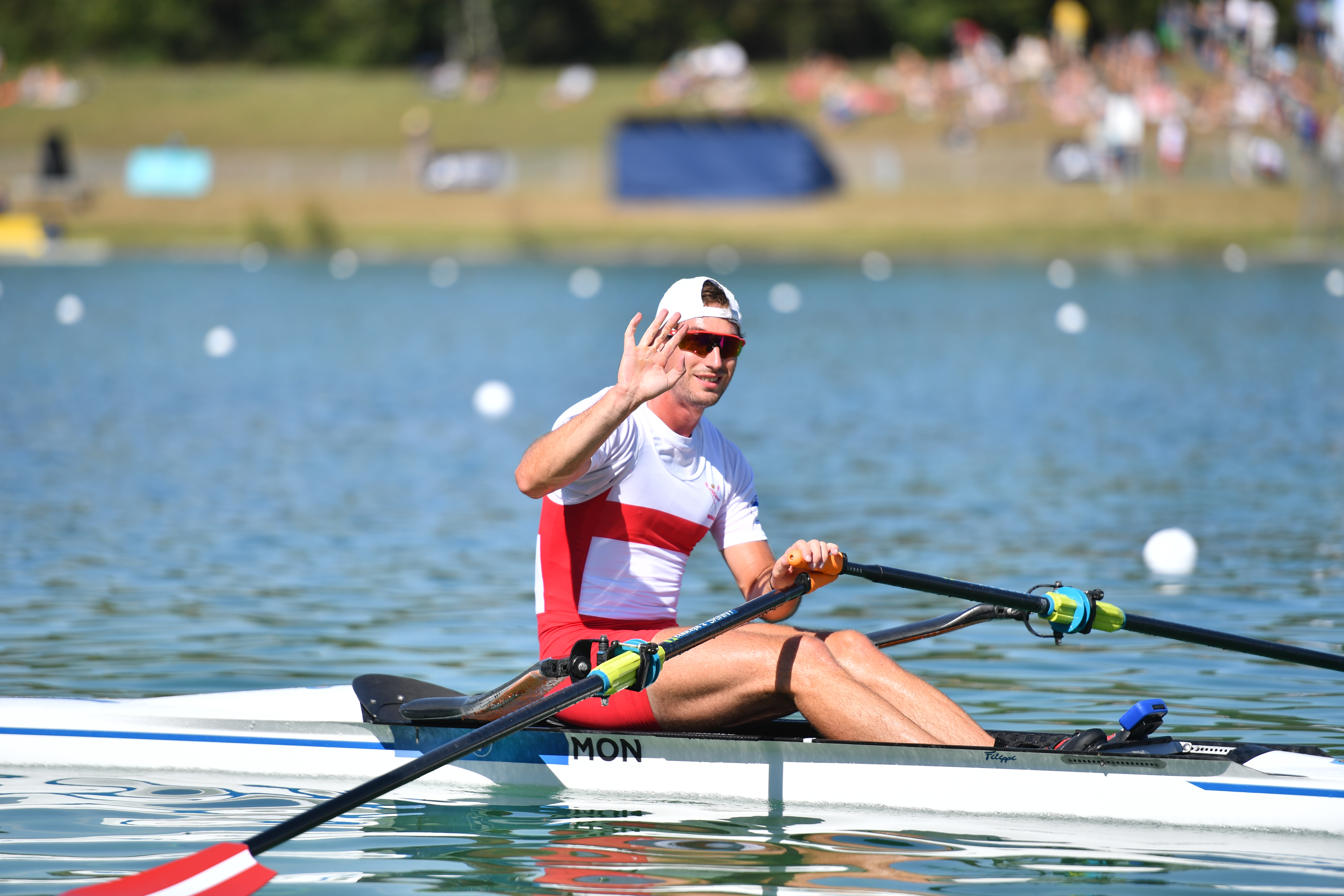
Antognelli in Munich 2022

Quentin Antognelli (born 15 August 1994 in Monte Carlo) is a Monegasque rower. He is a license holder of the Société Nautique de Monaco and represented the Principality of Monaco at the 2020 Olympic Games in Tokyo.

== Life ==
Quentin Antognelli was born on 15 August 1994 in Monaco. His father, Jean-Louis Antognelli, is Sports Director of the Société nautique de Monaco. In 2004, when Antognelli was 10 years old, he debuted in Italy at the Piediluco Students National Day. In 2008, he was second in Varese in the 2X with Federico Garibaldi. As of 2021 Antognelli is in his final year of a Master’s degree at Oxford Brookes University in England.

== Career ==
=== World Championships ===
In 2015, Antognelli won in the men’s single sculls (m1x) – repechage 3 in the World Championships 2015. The same year Antognelli and Giuseppe Alberti, who competed for Monaco, won the gold medal in the World Championships FISA Costal Rowing, and in 2016, the same team took a bronze medal in the Men’s Double Sculls (CM2x) Final of the World Coastal Championships in Monaco. In 2018, Antognelli finished 6th place at Rowing Championships in Shanghai. The same year he participated in 2018 World Rowing Championships in Plovdiv and took the fifth place in Final D.

=== Olympic Games ===
In 2020, Antognelli took part in Olympic Games Regatta. In April 2021, Antognelli took part in the European regatta to qualify for the Olympics. He qualified for his first Olympic Games, which took place from 23 July to 8 August 2021 in Tokyo. ) Antognelli is the second Monegasque qualified after table tennis player Xiaoxin Yang.
