= 2023 World Rowing Championships – Men's double sculls =

Men's double sculls at the 2023 World Rowing Championships
- Venue: Lake Sava
- Location: Belgrade, Serbia
- Dates: 3 September – 9 September
- Competitors: 60 from 30 nations
- Winning time: 6:09.19

Medalists
gold medal	Melvin Twellaar; Stef Broenink	Netherlands
silver medal	Martin Sinković; Valent Sinković	Croatia
bronze medal	Daire Lynch; Philip Doyle	Ireland

The men's double sculls competition at the 2023 World Rowing Championships took place at Lake Sava, in Belgrade.

== Schedule ==
The schedule was as follows:

Date	Time	Round
Sunday 3 September 2023	13:29	Heats
Monday 4 September 2023	13:15	Repechages
Wednesday 6 September 2023	13:46	Quarterfinals
Wednesday 6 September 2023	16:26	Final E
Thursday 7 September 2023	16:55	Semifinals C/D
Friday 8 September 2023	10:35	Semifinals A/B
Saturday 9 September 2023	09:54	Final D
Saturday 9 September 2023	10:32	Final C
Saturday 9 September 2023	11:30	Final B
Saturday 9 September 2023	13:30	Final A

All times are Central European Summer Time (UTC+2)

== Results ==
=== Heats ===
The four fastest boats in each heat advanced directly to the quarterfinals. The remaining boats were sent to the repechages.

==== Heat 1 ====
Rank	Rower	Country	Time	Notes
1	Florin Arteni; Ciprian Tudosă	Romania	6:08.15	Q
2	Jonas Gelsen; Marc Weber	Germany	6:10.06	Q
3	Aleix García; Rodrigo Conde	Spain	6:11.74	Q
4	Aleksandar Bedik; Aleksandar Filipović	Serbia	6:15.68	Q
5	Newton Seawright; Martin Zocalo	Uruguay	6:29.03	R
6	Oleksii Selivanov; Pavlo Yurchenko	Ukraine	6:29.52	R

==== Heat 2 ====
Rank	Rower	Country	Time	Notes
1	Melvin Twellaar; Stef Broenink	Netherlands	6:08.54	Q
2	Chirill Visotchi-Sestacov; Ivan Corsunov	Moldova	6:15.50	Q
3	Jonas Richter; Hugo Nerud	Sweden	6:18.65	Q
4	Tristan Vandenbussche; Aaron Andries	Belgium	6:22.12	Q
5	Harley Moore; Cormac Kennedy-Leverett	Australia	6:24.33	R
6	Fahad Albanki; Omar Alhasan	Bahrain	8:40.59	R

==== Heat 3 ====
Rank	Rower	Country	Time	Notes
1	Liu Zhiyu; Zhang Liang	China	6:11.88	Q
2	Luca Rambaldi; Matteo Sartori	Italy	6:13.00	Q
3	Žygimantas Gališanskis; Povilas Stankunas	Lithuania	6:16.48	Q
4	Ioannis Kalandaridis; Athanasios Palaiopanos	Greece	6:16.62	Q
5	Reidy Cardona; Carlos Ajete	Cuba	6:19.32	R
6	Jakub Podrazil; Jan Cincibuch	Czech Republic	6:32.07	R

==== Heat 4 ====
Rank	Rower	Country	Time	Notes
1	Sorin Koszyk; Ben Davison	United States	6:11.12	Q
2	Daire Lynch; Philip Doyle	Ireland	6:12.77	Q
3	Valentin Onfroy; Hugo Boucheron	France	6:14.27	Q
4	Konrad Domanski; Piotr Plominski	Poland	6:16.78	Q
5	Aidan Thompson; John Collins	Great Britain	6:19.31	R
6	Vincenzo Guirfa; Víctor Aspillaga	Peru	6:49.89	R

==== Heat 5 ====
Rank	Rower	Country	Time	Notes
1	Martin Sinković; Valent Sinković	Croatia	6:15.01	Q
2	Robbie Manson; Benjamin Mason	New Zealand	6:17.47	Q
3	Oscar Stabe Helvig; Kristoffer Brun	Norway	6:19.00	Q
4	Adriaan Jakobus Venter; Jake Green	South Africa	6:29.30	Q
5	Emil Neykov; Lazar Penev	Bulgaria	6:36.80	R
6	Seifeldeen Muhammad; Mohamed Ali Ali	Egypt	6:38.40	R

=== Repechages ===
The two fastest boats in each heat advanced to the quarterfinals. The remaining boats were sent to the Final E.

==== Repechage 1 ====
Rank	Rower	Country	Time	Notes
1	Reidy Cardona; Carlos Ajete	Cuba	6:47.31	Q
2	Emil Neykov; Lazar Penev	Bulgaria	6:48.17	Q
3	Newton Seawright; Martin Zocalo	Uruguay	6:48.37	FE
4	Vincenzo Guirfa; Victor Aspillaga	Peru	7:18.35	FE
5	Fahad Albanki; Omar Alhasan	Bahrain	9:38.64	FE

==== Repechage 2 ====
Rank	Rower	Country	Time	Notes
1	Jakub Podrazil; Jan Cincibuch	Czech Republic	6:50.81	Q
2	Harley Moore; Cormac Kennedy-Leverett	Australia	6:51.55	Q
3	Aidan Thompson; John Collins	Great Britain	6:56.09	FE
4	Oleksii Selivanov; Pavlo Yurchenko	Ukraine	7:07.08	FE
5	Seifeldeen Muhammad; Mohamed Ali Ali	Egypt	7:07.96	FE

=== Quarterfinals ===
The three fastest boats in each Quarterfinal advanced to the AB semifinals. The remaining boats were sent to the CD semifinals.

==== Quarterfinal 1 ====
Rank	Rower	Country	Time	Notes
1	Florin Arteni; Ciprian Tudosă	Romania	6:43.07	SA/B
2	Robbie Manson; Benjamin Mason	New Zealand	6:47.49	SA/B
3	Chirill Visotchi-Sestacov; Ivan Corsunov	Moldova	6:48.70	SA/B
4	Konrad Domanski; Piotr Plominski	Poland	6:54.75	SC/D
5	Žygimantas Gališanskis; Povilas Stankunas	Lithuania	6:57.84	SC/D
6	Emil Neykov; Lazar Penev	Bulgaria	7:20.22	SC/D

==== Quarterfinal 2 ====
Rank	Rower	Country	Time	Notes
1	Melvin Twellaar; Stef Broenink	Netherlands	6:38.79	SA/B
2	Daire Lynch; Philip Doyle	Ireland	6:41.89	SA/B
3	Jonas Gelsen; Marc Weber	Germany	6:46.11	SA/B
4	Reidy Cardona; Carlos Ajete	Cuba	6:52.30	SC/D
5	Ioannis Kalandaridis; Athanasios Palaiopanos	Greece	6:59.74	SC/D
6	Adriaan Jakobus Venter; Jake Green	South Africa	7:02.95	SC/D

==== Quarterfinal 3 ====
Rank	Rower	Country	Time	Notes
1	Martin Sinković; Valent Sinković	Croatia	6:42.38	SA/B
2	Liu Zhiyu; Zhang Liang	China	6:45.18	SA/B
3	Valentin Onfroy; Hugo Boucheron	France	6:46.76	SA/B
4	Jonas Richter; Hugo Nerud	Sweden	6:48.91	SC/D
5	Harley Moore; Cormac Kennedy-Leverett	Australia	6:54.34	SC/D
6	Aleksandar Bedik; Aleksandar Filipović	Serbia	7:03.01	SC/D

==== Quarterfinal 4 ====
Rank	Rower	Country	Time	Notes
1	Aleix García; Rodrigo Conde	Spain	6:41.11	SA/B
2	Luca Rambaldi; Matteo Sartori	Italy	6:42.05	SA/B
3	Oscar Stabe Helvig; Kristoffer Brun	Norway	6:42.23	SA/B
4	Sorin Koszyk; Ben Davison	United States	6:48.08	SC/D
5	Jakub Podrazil; Jan Cincibuch	Czech Republic	6:49.95	SC/D
6	Tristan Vandenbussche; Aaron Andries	Belgium	6:55.84	SC/D

=== Semifinals C/D ===
The three fastest boats in each semi advanced to the C final. The remaining boats were sent to the D final.

==== Semifinal 1 ====
Rank	Rower	Country	Time	Notes
1	Konrad Domanski; Piotr Plominski	Poland	6:42.89	FC
2	Aleksandar Bedik; Aleksandar Filipović	Serbia	6:43.23	FC
3	Jakub Podrazil; Jan Cincibuch	Czech Republic	6:43.45	FC
4	Reidy Cardona; Carlos Ajete	Cuba	6:43.78	FD
5	Harley Moore; Cormac Kennedy-Leverett	Australia	7:01.45	FD
6	Emil Neykov; Lazar Penev	Bulgaria	7:05.02	FD

==== Semifinal 2 ====
Rank	Rower	Country	Time	Notes
1	Sorin Koszyk; Ben Davison	United States	6:37.14	FC
2	Jonas Richter; Hugo Nerud	Sweden	6:41.60	FC
3	Žygimantas Gališanskis; Povilas Stankunas	Lithuania	6:44.28	FC
4	Ioannis Kalandaridis; Athanasios Palaiopanos	Greece	6:51.32	FD
5	Tristan Vandenbussche; Aaron Andries	Belgium	6:52.13	FD
6	Adriaan Jakobus Venter; Jake Green	South Africa	6:58.13	FD

=== Semifinals A/B ===
The three fastest boats in each semi advanced to the A final. The remaining boats were sent to the B final.

==== Semifinal 1 ====
Rank	Rower	Country	Time	Notes
1	Melvin Twellaar; Stef Broenink	Netherlands	6:19.31	FA
2	Luca Rambaldi; Matteo Sartori	Italy	6:23.94	FA
3	Liu Zhiyu; Zhang Liang	China	6:27.42	FA
4	Florin Arteni; Ciprian Tudosă	Romania	6:31.36	FB
5	Valentin Onfroy; Hugo Boucheron	France	6:34.65	FB
6	Chirill Visotchi-Sestacov; Ivan Corsunov	Moldova	6:38.60	FB

==== Semifinal 2 ====
Rank	Rower	Country	Time	Notes
1	Martin Sinković; Valent Sinković	Croatia	6:23.02	FA
2	Daire Lynch; Philip Doyle	Ireland	6:24.28	FA
3	Aleix García; Rodrigo Conde	Spain	6:26.53	FA
4	Robbie Manson; Benjamin Mason	New Zealand	6:29.71	FB
5	Jonas Gelsen; Marc Weber	Germany	6:30.01	FB
6	Oscar Stabe Helvig; Kristoffer Brun	Norway	6:32.59	FB

=== Finals ===
The A final determined the rankings for places 1 to 6. Additional rankings were determined in the other finals.

==== Final E ====
Rank	Rower	Country	Time	Total rank
1	Aidan Thompson; John Collins	Great Britain	6:53.09	25
2	Seifeldeen Muhammad; Mohamed Ali Ali	Egypt	6:57.94	26
3	Oleksii Selivanov; Pavlo Yurchenko	Ukraine	6:59.05	27
4	Newton Seawright; Martin Zocalo	Uruguay	7:03.74	28
5	Vincenzo Guirfa; Víctor Aspillaga	Peru	7:22.64	29
6	Fahad Albanki; Omar Alhasan	Bahrain	9:41.75	30

==== Final D ====
Rank	Rower	Country	Time	Total rank
1	Ioannis Kalandaridis; Athanasios Palaiopanos	Greece	6:16.75	19
2	Reidy Cardona; Carlos Ajete	Cuba	6:18.76	20
3	Harley Moore; Cormac Kennedy-Leverett	Australia	6:21.89	21
4	Tristan Vandenbussche; Aaron Andries	Belgium	6:24.07	22
5	Adriaan Jakobus Venter; Jake Green	South Africa	6:26.99	23
	Emil Neykov; Lazar Penev	Bulgaria	DNS	24

==== Final C ====
Rank	Rower	Country	Time	Total rank
1	Sorin Koszyk; Ben Davison	United States	6:12.55	13
2	Aleksandar Bedik; Aleksandar Filipović	Serbia	6:20.37	14
3	Žygimantas Gališanskis; Povilas Stankunas	Lithuania	6:22.08	15
4	Jakub Podrazil; Jan Cincibuch	Czech Republic	6:25.54	16
5	Konrad Domanski; Piotr Plominski	Poland	6:26.41	17
	Jonas Richter; Hugo Nerud	Sweden	DNS	18

==== Final B ====
Rank	Rower	Country	Time	Total rank
1	Florin Arteni; Ciprian Tudosă	Romania	6:14.77	7
2	Jonas Gelsen; Marc Weber	Germany	6:15.48	8
3	Oscar Stabe Helvig; Kristoffer Brun	Norway	6:16.41	9
4	Valentin Onfroy; Hugo Boucheron	France	6:17.32	10
5	Robbie Manson; Benjamin Mason	New Zealand	6:18.79	11
6	Chirill Visotchi-Sestacov; Ivan Corsunov	Moldova	6:20.35	12

==== Final A ====
Rank	Rower	Country	Time
1st place, gold medalist(s)	Melvin Twellaar; Stef Broenink	Netherlands	6:09.19
2nd place, silver medalist(s)	Martin Sinković; Valent Sinković	Croatia	6:12.44
3rd place, bronze medalist(s)	Daire Lynch; Philip Doyle	Ireland	6:13.41
4	Luca Rambaldi; Matteo Sartori	Italy	6:15.70
5	Aleix García; Rodrigo Conde	Spain	6:17.51
6	Liu Zhiyu; Zhang Liang	China	6:27.64
