= 2022 World Rowing Championships – Men's double sculls =

Men's double sculls at the 2022 World Rowing Championships
- Venue: Labe aréna
- Location: Račice, Czech Republic
- Dates: 18 September – 25 September
- Competitors: 51 from 25 nations
- Winning time: 6:09.34

Medalists
gold medal	Hugo Boucheron; Matthieu Androdias	France
silver medal	Aleix García; Rodrigo Conde	Spain
bronze medal	David Bartholot; Caleb Antill	Australia

The men's double sculls competition at the 2022 World Rowing Championships took place at the Račice regatta venue.

== Schedule ==
The schedule was as follows:

Date	Time	Round
Sunday 18 September 2022	12:54	Heats
Monday 19 September 2022	17:01	Repechages
Wednesday 21 September 2022	11:32	Quarterfinals
Thursday 22 September 2022	16:10	Semifinals C/D
Friday 23 September 2022	11:56	Semifinals A/B
Sunday 25 September 2022	10:56	Final D
Sunday 25 September 2022	11:32	Final C
Sunday 25 September 2022	12:28	Final B
Sunday 25 September 2022	13:39	Final A

All times are Central European Summer Time (UTC+2)

== Results ==
=== Heats ===
The four fastest boats in each heat advanced directly to the quarterfinals. The remaining boats were sent to the repechages.

==== Heat 1 ====
Rank	Rower	Country	Time	Notes
1	David Bartholot; Caleb Antill	Australia	6:19.83	Q
2	Davide Mumolo; Luca Rambaldi	Italy	6:23.31	Q
3	Daniel de Groot; Gavin Stone	Canada	6:32.81	Q
4	Kristof Acs; Maté Bácskai	Hungary	6:34.08	Q
5	Juho-Pekka Petäjäniemi; Jukka-Pekka Kauppi	Finland	6:52.61	R

==== Heat 2 ====
Rank	Rower	Country	Time	Notes
1	Armandas Kelmelis; Dovydas Nemeravičius	Lithuania	6:14.61	Q
2	Konan Pazzaia; Philip Doyle	Ireland	6:17.70	Q
3	Aleksandar Filipović; Aleksandar Beđik	Serbia	6:41.45	Q
4	Jakub Herhonek; Ondrej Kovačovič	Slovakia	6:51.47	Q
5	Franck N'Dri; Riccardo Bouehi	Ivory Coast	7:14.61	R

==== Heat 3 ====
Rank	Rower	Country	Time	Notes
1	Aleix García; Rodrigo Conde	Spain	6:17.98	Q
2	Oscar Stabe Helvig; Kristoffer Brun	Norway	6:19.55	Q
3	Ioannis Kalandaridis; Athanasios Palaiopanos	Greece	6:22.82	Q
4	Max Appel; Moritz Wolff	Germany	6:26.27	WD
5	Mekhrojbek Mamatkulov; Shakhboz Kholmurzaev	Uzbekistan	6:27.96	R

==== Heat 4 ====
Rank	Rower	Country	Time	Notes
1	Martin Sinković; Valent Sinković	Croatia	6:12.76	Q
2	Andrei-Sebastian Cornea; Cristian-Ionut Cojocaru	Romania	6:16.73	Q
3	Jakub Podrazil; Jan Cincibuch	Czech Republic	6:27.93	Q
4	Sorin Koszyk; Thomas Phifer	United States	6:32.59	Q
5	Liu Baishun; Ou Zhiwei	China	6:40.28	R

==== Heat 5 ====
Rank	Rower	Country	Time	Notes
1	Hugo Boucheron; Matthieu Androdias	France	6:18.41	Q
2	Chirill Vîsoțchi-Șestacov; Ivan Corșunov	Moldova	6:21.85	Q
3	Krzysztof Kasparek; Szymon Pośnik	Poland	6:27.57	Q
4	Armin Auerbach; Thomas Lehner	Austria	6:36.09	Q
5	Carlos Ajete; Boris Guerra	Cuba	6:46.24	R

=== Repechage ===
The four fastest boats in repechage advanced to the quarterfinals. The remaining boat was relegated.

Rank	Rower	Country	Time	Notes
1	Carlos Ajete; Boris Guerra	Cuba	6:23.80	Q
2	Mekhrojbek Mamatkulov; Shakhboz Kholmurzaev	Uzbekistan	6:25.05	Q
3	Liu Baishun; Ou Zhiwei	China	6:28.03	Q
4	Juho-Pekka Petäjäniemi; Jukka-Pekka Kauppi	Finland	6:50.83	Q
5	Franck N'Dri; Riccardo Bouehi	Ivory Coast	7:13.45	Q

=== Quarterfinals ===
The three fastest boats in each quarter advanced to the A/B semifinals. The remaining boats were sent to the C/D semifinals.

==== Quarterfinal 1 ====
Rank	Rower	Country	Time	Notes
1	David Bartholot; Caleb Antill	Australia	6:21.59	SA/B
2	Ioannis Kalandaridis; Athanasios Palaiopanos	Greece	6:25.12	SA/B
3	Jakub Podrazil; Jan Cincibuch	Czech Republic	6:25.74	SA/B
4	Armandas Kelmelis; Dovydas Nemeravičius	Lithuania	6:43.23	SC/D
5	Armin Auerbach; Thomas Lehner	Austria	6:50.20	SC/D
6	Franck N'Dri; Riccardo Bouehi	Ivory Coast	7:21.10	SC/D

==== Quarterfinal 2 ====
Rank	Rower	Country	Time	Notes
1	Aleix García; Rodrigo Conde	Spain	6:26.82	SA/B
2	Krzysztof Kasparek; Szymon Pośnik	Poland	6:29.39	SA/B
3	Daniel de Groot; Gavin Stone	Canada	6:30.71	SA/B
4	Andrei-Sebastian Cornea; Cristian-Ionut Cojocaru	Romania	6:34.41	SC/D
5	Liu Baishun; Ou Zhiwei	China	6:36.76	SC/D
6	Jakub Herhonek; Ondrej Kovačovič	Slovakia	7:00.41	SC/D

==== Quarterfinal 3 ====
Rank	Rower	Country	Time	Notes
1	Martin Sinković; Valent Sinković	Croatia	6:21.49	SA/B
2	Chirill Vîsoțchi-Șestacov; Ivan Corșunov	Moldova	6:23.25	SA/B
3	Davide Mumolo; Luca Rambaldi	Italy	6:23.67	SA/B
4	Aleksandar Filipović; Aleksandar Beđik	Serbia	6:24.34	SC/D
5	Carlos Ajete; Boris Guerra	Cuba	6:38.64	SC/D
6	Juho-Pekka Petäjäniemi; Jukka-Pekka Kauppi	Finland	6:49.26	SC/D

==== Quarterfinal 4 ====
Rank	Rower	Country	Time	Notes
1	Hugo Boucheron; Matthieu Androdias	France	6:20.58	SA/B
2	Sorin Koszyk; Thomas Phifer	United States	6:21.81	SA/B
3	Oscar Stabe Helvig; Kristoffer Brun	Norway	6:22.11	SA/B
4	Konan Pazzaia; Philip Doyle	Ireland	6:22.14	SC/D
5	Mekhrojbek Mamatkulov; Shakhboz Kholmurzaev	Uzbekistan	6:40.26	SC/D
6	Kristof Acs; Maté Bácskai	Hungary	6:41.19	SC/D

=== Semifinals C/D ===
The three fastest boats in each semi advanced to the C final. The remaining boats were sent to the D final.

==== Semifinal 1 ====
Rank	Rower	Country	Time	Notes
1	Armandas Kelmelis; Dovydas Nemeravičius	Lithuania	6:30.93	FC
2	Andrei-Sebastian Cornea; Cristian-Ionut Cojocaru	Romania	6:35.19	FC
3	Carlos Ajete; Boris Guerra	Cuba	6:36.08	FC
4	Mekhrojbek Mamatkulov; Shakhboz Kholmurzaev	Uzbekistan	6:45.83	FD
5	Juho-Pekka Petäjäniemi; Jukka-Pekka Kauppi	Finland	6:47.05	FD
6	Franck N'Dri; Riccardo Bouehi	Ivory Coast	7:29.09	FD

==== Semifinal 2 ====
Rank	Rower	Country	Time	Notes
1	Konan Pazzaia; Philip Doyle	Ireland	6:30.90	FC
2	Aleksandar Filipović; Aleksandar Beđik	Serbia	6:37.71	FC
3	Kristof Acs; Maté Bácskai	Hungary	6:40.48	FC
4	Liu Baishun; Ou Zhiwei	China	6:43.45	FD
5	Armin Auerbach; Thomas Lehner	Austria	6:46.42	FD
6	Jakub Herhonek; Ondrej Kovačovič	Slovakia	6:54.11	FD

=== Semifinals A/B ===
The three fastest boats in each semi advanced to the A final. The remaining boats were sent to the B final.

==== Semifinal 1 ====
Rank	Rower	Country	Time	Notes
1	Aleix García; Rodrigo Conde	Spain	6:11.46	FA
2	David Bartholot; Caleb Antill	Australia	6:12.98	FA
3	Chirill Vîsoțchi-Șestacov; Ivan Corșunov	Moldova	6:13.90	FA
4	Davide Mumolo; Luca Rambaldi	Italy	6:15.29	FB
5	Jakub Podrazil; Jan Cincibuch	Czech Republic	6:18.09	FB
6	Sorin Koszyk; Thomas Phifer	United States	6:21.25	FB

==== Semifinal 2 ====
Rank	Rower	Country	Time	Notes
1	Hugo Boucheron; Matthieu Androdias	France	6:12.43	FA
2	Ioannis Kalandaridis; Athanasios Palaiopanos	Greece	6:14.98	FA
3	Martin Sinković; Valent Sinković	Croatia	6:15.27	FA
4	Oscar Stabe Helvig; Kristoffer Brun	Norway	6:16.71	FB
5	Krzysztof Kasparek; Szymon Pośnik	Poland	6:26.20	FB
6	Daniel de Groot; Gavin Stone	Canada	6:28.18	FB

=== Finals ===
The A final determined the rankings for places 1 to 6. Additional rankings were determined in the other finals

==== Final D ====
Rank	Rower	Country	Time	Total rank
1	Mekhrojbek Mamatkulov; Shakhboz Kholmurzaev	Uzbekistan	6:34.00	19
2	Armin Auerbach; Thomas Lehner	Austria	6:36.29	20
3	Liu Baishun; Ou Zhiwei	China	6:36.36	21
4	Juho-Pekka Petäjäniemi; Jukka-Pekka Kauppi	Finland	6:39.79	22
5	Jakub Herhonek; Ondrej Kovačovič	Slovakia	6:42.32	23
6	Franck N'Dri; Riccardo Bouehi	Ivory Coast	7:19.97	24

==== Final C ====
Rank	Rower	Country	Time	Total rank
1	Konan Pazzaia; Philip Doyle	Ireland	6:18.32	13
2	Armandas Kelmelis; Dovydas Nemeravičius	Lithuania	6:21.09	14
3	Aleksandar Filipović; Aleksandar Beđik	Serbia	6:27.86	15
4	Kristof Acs; Maté Bácskai	Hungary	6:30.45	16
5	Andrei-Sebastian Cornea; Cristian-Ionut Cojocaru	Romania	6:30.99	17
6	Carlos Ajete; Boris Guerra	Cuba	6:34.05	18

==== Final B ====
Rank	Rower	Country	Time	Total rank
1	Sorin Koszyk; Thomas Phifer	United States	6:19.31	7
2	Krzysztof Kasparek; Szymon Pośnik	Poland	6:19.96	8
3	Davide Mumolo; Luca Rambaldi	Italy	6:20.55	9
4	Jakub Podrazil; Jan Cincibuch	Czech Republic	6:21.29	10
5	Daniel de Groot; Gavin Stone	Canada	6:26.17	11
6	Oscar Stabe Helvig; Mathias Føyner Wie	Norway	6:33.31	12

==== Final A ====
Rank	Rower	Country	Time	Notes
1st place, gold medalist(s)	Hugo Boucheron; Matthieu Androdias	France	6:09.34	
2nd place, silver medalist(s)	Aleix García; Rodrigo Conde	Spain	6:10.52	
3rd place, bronze medalist(s)	David Bartholot; Caleb Antill	Australia	6:11.92	
4	Martin Sinković; Valent Sinković	Croatia	6:14.99	
5	Chirill Vîsoțchi-Șestacov; Ivan Corșunov	Moldova	6:23.20	
6	Ioannis Kalandaridis; Athanasios Palaiopanos	Greece	6:32.78	
