= Rowing at the 2024 Summer Olympics – Men's double sculls =

Men's double sculls at the Games of the XXXIII Olympiad
- Olympic rowing
- Venue: Stade nautique de Vaires-sur-Marne, National Olympic Nautical Stadium of Île-de-France, Vaires-sur-Marne
- Dates: 27 July – 1 August 2024
- Competitors: 13 from 13 nations
- Winning time: 6:12.58

Medalists
| 1st place, gold medalist(s) | | Andrei-Sebastian Cornea; Marian Enache | Romania |
| 2nd place, silver medalist(s) | | Melvin Twellaar; Stef Broenink | Netherlands |
| 3rd place, bronze medalist(s) | | Daire Lynch; Philip Doyle | Ireland |

The men's double sculls event at the 2024 Summer Olympics took place from 27 July to 1 August 2024 at the Stade nautique de Vaires-sur-Marne, National Olympic Nautical Stadium of Île-de-France, Vaires-sur-Marne.

== Background ==
This is the 26th appearance of the event, which was not held at the first Games in 1896 (when bad weather forced the cancellation of all rowing events), at the 1908 games, and at the 1912 games.

== Qualification ==
Each National Olympic Committee (NOC) was limited to a single boat (one rower) in the event since 1912.

== Competition format ==
This rowing event is a double scull event, meaning that each boat is propelled by two rowers. The "scull" portion means that the rower uses two oars, one on each side of the boat; this contrasts with sweep rowing in which each rower has one oar and rows on only one side. The competition consists of multiple rounds. The competition continues to use the three-round format. Finals are held to determine the placing of each boat. The course uses the 2000 metres distance that became the Olympic standard in 1912.

During the first round three heats were held. The first three boats in each heat advanced to the semifinals, with the others relegated to the repechages.

The repechage is a round which offered rowers a second chance to qualify for the semifinals. Placing in the repechage determined which semifinal the boat would race in. The top three boats in the repechage move on to the semifinals, with the remaining boats being eliminated.

Two semifinals were held, each with 6 boats. The top three boats from each heat advanced to Final A and compete for a medal. The remaining boats advanced to Final B.

The third and final round was the finals. Each final determines a set of rankings. The A final determined the medals, along with the rest of the places through 6th, while the B final gives rankings from 7th to 12th.

== Schedule ==
The competition is being held over six days.

All times are Central European Summer Time (UTC+2)

| Date | Time | Round |
|---|---|---|
| Saturday, 27 July 2024 | 11:30 | Heats |
| Sunday, 28 July 2024 | 10:20 | Repechage |
| Tuesday, 30 July 2024 | 11:10 | Semifinals A/B |
| Thursday, 1 August | 10:42 | Final B |
| Thursday, 1 August | 11:30 | Final A |

== Results ==
=== Heats ===
The first three of each heat qualified for the semifinals, while the remainder went to the repechage.

==== Heat 1 ====
| Rank | Lane | Rower | Nation | Time | Notes |
|---|---|---|---|---|---|
| 1 | 1 | Melvin Twellaar; Stef Broenink | Netherlands | 6:14.13 | Q |
| 2 | 3 | Robbie Manson; Jordan Parry | New Zealand | 6:16.41 | Q |
| 3 | 2 | Sorin Koszyk; Ben Davison | United States | 6:16.48 | Q |
| 4 | 5 | Martin Mačković; Nikolaj Pimenov | Serbia | 6:17.36 | R |
| 5 | 4 | Liu Zhiyu; Adilijiang Sulitan | China | 6:29.70 | R |

==== Heat 2 ====
| Rank | Lane | Rower | Nation | Time | Notes |
|---|---|---|---|---|---|
| 1 | 4 | Andrei-Sebastian Cornea; Marian Enache | Romania | 6:16.47 | Q |
| 2 | 2 | Martin Helseth; Kjetil Borch | Norway | 6:22.36 | Q |
| 3 | 1 | Patrik Lončarić; Anton Lončarić | Croatia | 6:24.62 | Q |
| 4 | 3 | Nicolò Carucci; Matteo Sartori | Italy | 6:48.77 | R |

==== Heat 3 ====
| Rank | Lane | Rower | Nation | Time | Notes |
|---|---|---|---|---|---|
| 1 | 3 | Daire Lynch; Philip Doyle | Ireland | 6:13.24 | Q |
| 2 | 1 | Aleix García; Rodrigo Conde | Spain | 6:16.17 | Q |
| 3 | 2 | Hugo Boucheron; Matthieu Androdias | France | 6:18.69 | Q |
| 4 | 4 | Jonas Gelsen; Marc Weber | Germany | 6:25.15 | R |

=== Repechage ===
The first three doubles in the repechage qualified for the semifinals, while the fourth was eliminated.

==== Repechage heat 1 ====
| Rank | Lane | Rower | Nation | Time | Notes |
|---|---|---|---|---|---|
| 1 | 3 | Martin Mačković; Nikolaj Pimenov | Serbia | 6:31.54 | Q |
| 2 | 4 | Jonas Gelsen; Marc Weber | Germany | 6:34.59 | Q |
| 3 | 1 | Liu Zhiyu; Adilijiang Sulitan | China | 6:39.06 | Q |
| 4 | 2 | Nicolò Carucci; Matteo Sartori | Italy | 6:43.83 | |

=== Semifinals ===
The first three of each heat qualify to the Final A, other to Final B

==== Semifinal A/B 1 ====
| Rank | Lane | Rower | Nation | Time | Notes |
|---|---|---|---|---|---|
| 1 | 4 | Melvin Twellaar; Stef Broenink | Netherlands | 6:13.60 | FA |
| 2 | 5 | Aleix García; Rodrigo Conde | Spain | 6:14.91 | FA |
| 3 | 3 | Andrei-Sebastian Cornea; Marian Enache | Romania | 6:15.73 | FA |
| 4 | 6 | Martin Mačković; Nikolaj Pimenov | Serbia | 6:17.35 | FB |
| 5 | 1 | Liu Zhiyu; Adilijiang Sulitan | China | 6:38.82 | FB |
| 6 | 2 | Patrik Lončarić; Anton Lončarić | Croatia | 6:49.51 | FB |

==== Semifinal A/B 2 ====
| Rank | Lane | Rower | Nation | Time | Notes |
|---|---|---|---|---|---|
| 1 | 4 | Daire Lynch; Philip Doyle | Ireland | 6:13.14 | FA |
| 2 | 2 | Sorin Koszyk; Ben Davison | United States | 6:14.19 | FA |
| 3 | 3 | Robbie Manson; Jordan Parry | New Zealand | 6:14.30 | FA |
| 4 | 1 | Jonas Gelsen; Marc Weber | Germany | 6:17.69 | FB |
| 5 | 6 | Hugo Boucheron; Matthieu Androdias | France | 6:19.35 | FB |
| 6 | 5 | Martin Helseth; Kjetil Borch | Norway | 6:20.27 | FB |

=== Finals ===
==== Final B ====
| Rank | Lane | Rower | Nation | Time | Notes |
|---|---|---|---|---|---|
| 7 | 4 | Martin Mačković; Nikolaj Pimenov | Serbia | 6:13.85 | |
| 8 | 5 | Hugo Boucheron; Matthieu Androdias | France | 6:15.28 | |
| 9 | 3 | Jonas Gelsen; Marc Weber | Germany | 6:17.07 | |
| 10 | 6 | Martin Helseth; Kjetil Borch | Norway | 6:17.51 | |
| 11 | 2 | Liu Zhiyu; Adilijiang Sulitan | China | 6:21.98 | |
| 12 | 1 | Patrik Lončarić; Anton Lončarić | Croatia | 6:26.04 | |

==== Final A ====
| Rank | Lane | Rower | Nation | Time | Notes |
|---|---|---|---|---|---|
| 1st place, gold medalist(s) | 1 | Andrei Cornea; Marian Enache | Romania | 6:12.58 | |
| 2nd place, silver medalist(s) | 4 | Melvin Twellaar; Stef Broenink | Netherlands | 6:13.92 | |
| 3rd place, bronze medalist(s) | 3 | Daire Lynch; Philip Doyle | Ireland | 6:15.17 | |
| 4 | 5 | Sorin Koszyk; Ben Davison | United States | 6:17.02 | |
| 5 | 2 | Aleix García; Rodrigo Conde | Spain | 6:20.59 | |
| 6 | 6 | Robbie Manson; Jordan Parry | New Zealand | 6:21.44 | |
