= 2025 World Rowing Championships – Men's double sculls =

Men's double sculls at the 2025 World Rowing Championships
- Venue: Dianshan Lake
- Location: Shanghai, China
- Dates: 22–26 September
- Competitors: 39 from 19 nations
- Winning time: 6:11.97

Medalists
gold medal	Mirosław Ziętarski; Mateusz Biskup	Poland
silver medal	Martin Mačković; Nikolaj Pimenov	Serbia
bronze medal	Philip Doyle; Fintan McCarthy	Ireland

The men's double sculls competition at the 2025 World Rowing Championships took place at Dianshan Lake, in Shanghai.

== Schedule ==
The schedule was as follows:

Date	Time	Round
Monday 22 September 2025	10:49	Heats
Thursday, 25 September 2025	11:15	Semifinals
Thursday, 25 September 2025	11:54	Final C
Friday, 26 September 2025	13:37	Final B
Friday, 26 September 2025	14:51	Final A

All times are UTC+08:00

== Results ==
=== Heats ===
The two fastest boats in each heat and the four fastest times advanced to the semifinals. The remaining boats were sent to the Final C.

==== Heat 1 ====
Rank	Rower	Country	Time	Notes
1	Philip Doyle; Fintan McCarthy	Ireland	6:20.67	SF
2	Niels Torre; Gabriel Soares	Italy	6:25.82	SF
3	Uku Siim Timmusk; Johann Poolak	Estonia	6:29.49	FC
4	Febrian Febrian; Memo Memo	Indonesia	6:31.12	FC
5	Kim Dong-yong; Kim Jong-min	South Korea	6:37.49	FC

==== Heat 2 ====
Rank	Rower	Country	Time	Notes
1	Mirosław Ziętarski; Mateusz Biskup	Poland	6:11.99	SF
2	Aleix García; Rodrigo Conde	Spain	6:13.42	SF
3	Aleksandr Iakovlev; Andrey Potapkin	Individual Neutral Athletes	6:14.96	SF
4	Lucas Keijzer; Mats van Sabben	Netherlands	6:18.90	SF
5	Trevor Jones; Terek Been	Canada	6:41.14	

==== Heat 3 ====
Rank	Rower	Country	Time	Notes
1	Martin Mačković; Nikolaj Pimenov	Serbia	6:13.18	SF
2	Finlay Hamill; Benjamin Mason	New Zealand	6:14.74	SF
3	Aaron Andries; Tristan Vandenbussche	Belgium	6:15.17	SF
4	Oscar McGuinness; Mitchell Reinhard	Australia	6:17.34	SF
5	Antonios Papakonstantinou; Petros Gkaidatzis	Greece	6:24.43	FC

==== Heat 4 ====
Rank	Rower	Country	Time	Notes
1	Andrei Cornea; Marian Enache	Romania	6:11.88	SF
2	Kai Schätzle; Raphaël Ahumada	Switzerland	6:16.83	SF
3	Aidan Thompson; Tobias Schroder	Great Britain	6:20.22	FC
4	Samuel Melvin; Andrew Leroux	United States	6:23.50	FC

=== Semifinals ===
The three fastest boats in each heat advance to the Final A. The remaining boats were sent to the Final B.

==== Semifinal 1 ====
Rank	Rower	Country	Time	Notes
1	Andrei Cornea; Marian Enache	Romania	6:31.08	FA
2	Philip Doyle; Fintan McCarthy	Ireland	6:33.14	FA
3	Aleix García; Rodrigo Conde	Spain	6:35.98	FA
4	Niels Torre; Gabriel Soares	Italy	6:37.32	FB
5	Lucas Keijzer; Mats van Sabben	Netherlands	6:43.27	FB
6	Aleksandr Iakovlev; Andrey Potapkin	Individual Neutral Athletes	6:46.11	FB

==== Semifinal 2 ====
Rank	Rower	Country	Time	Notes
1	Martin Mačković; Nikolaj Pimenov	Serbia	6:36.46	FA
2	Mirosław Ziętarski; Mateusz Biskup	Poland	6:37.07	FA
3	Kai Schätzle; Raphaël Ahumada	Switzerland	6:38.68	FA
4	Finlay Hamill; Benjamin Mason	New Zealand	6:40.23	FB
5	Aaron Andries; Tristan Vandenbussche	Belgium	6:52.47	FB
6	Oscar McGuinness; Mitchell Reinhard	Australia	6:54.18	FB

=== Finals ===
The A final determined the rankings for places 1 to 6. Additional rankings were determined in the other finals.

==== Final C ====
Rank	Rower	Country	Time	Total rank
1	Samuel Melvin; Andrew Leroux	United States	6:26.87	13
2	James Gare; Tobias Schroder	Great Britain	6:28.28	14
3	Antonios Papakonstantinou; Petros Gkaidatzis	Greece	6:30.56	15
4	Febrian Febrian; Memo Memo	Indonesia	6:34.56	16
5	Kim Dong-yong; Kim Jong-min	South Korea	6:34.90	17
6	Uku Siim Timmusk; Johann Poolak	Estonia	6:38.57	18

==== Final B ====
Rank	Rower	Country	Time	Total rank
1	Aleksandr Iakovlev; Andrey Potapkin	Individual Neutral Athletes	6:20.29	7
2	Finlay Hamill; Benjamin Mason	New Zealand	6:22.08	8
3	Aaron Andries; Tristan Vandenbussche	Belgium	6:23.28	9
4	Niels Torre; Gabriel Soares	Italy	6:23.61	10
5	Lucas Keijzer; Mats van Sabben	Netherlands	6:25.95	11
6	Oscar McGuinness; Mitchell Reinhard	Australia	6:29.04	12

==== Final A ====
Rank	Rower	Country	Time	Notes
1st place, gold medalist(s)	Mirosław Ziętarski; Mateusz Biskup	Poland	6:11.97	
2nd place, silver medalist(s)	Martin Mačković; Nikolaj Pimenov	Serbia	6:13.57	
3rd place, bronze medalist(s)	Philip Doyle; Fintan McCarthy	Ireland	6:15.13	
4	Aleix García; Rodrigo Conde	Spain	6:17.42	
5	Kai Schätzle; Raphaël Ahumada	Switzerland	6:19.27	
6	Andrei Cornea; Marian Enache	Romania	6:20.49	
