= 2026 World Rowing Championships – Men's double sculls =

Men's double sculls at the 2026 World Rowing Championships
- Venue: Bosbaan
- Location: Amsterdam, Netherlands
- Dates: 24–28 August
- Competitors: 52 from 26 nations
- Winning time: 6:04.42

Medalists
gold medal	Melvin Twellaar; Simon van Dorp	Netherlands
silver medal	Martin Mačković; Nikolaj Pimenov	Serbia
bronze medal	Aaron Andries; Tibo Vyvey	Belgium

The men's double sculls competition at the 2026 World Rowing Championships took place at Bosbaan, in Amsterdam.

== Schedule ==
The schedule was as follows:

Date	Time	Round
Monday 24 August 2026	18:40	Heats
Tuesday 25 August 2026	16:03	Quarterfinals
Wednesday 26 August 2026	15:38	Final C
Wednesday 26 August 2026	15:45	Final D
Wednesday 26 August 2026	15:51	Final E
Wednesday 26 August 2026	17:59	Semifinals
Friday, 28 August 2026	15:09	Final B
Friday, 28 August 2026	18:35	Final A

All times are Central European Summer Time (UTC+2)

== Results ==
=== Heats ===
The two fastest boats in each heat and the fourteen fastest times advanced directly to the quarterfinals. The remaining boats were sent to the Final E.

==== Heat 1 ====
Rank	Rower	Country	Time	Notes
1	Matt Haywood; Joshua Knight	Great Britain	6:58.10	QF
2	Caetano Horta; Rodrigo Conde	Spain	7:03.55	QF
3	Alexandr Bulat; Ivan Corsunov	Moldova	7:05.73	QF
4	Pedro Rodrigues; Tomas Neves	Portugal	7:15.93	QF
5	Erik Bröte; Gustav Arvidsson	Sweden	7:19.31	QF
6	Amel Younis; Ryan Ghalayini	Palestine	8:06.40	FE

==== Heat 2 ====
Rank	Rower	Country	Time	Notes
1	Andrei Cornea; Marian Enache	Romania	6:56.55	QF
2	Finlay Hamill; Benjamin Mason	New Zealand	7:09.63	QF
3	Piotr Plomiński; Michał Rańda	Poland	7:15.44	QF
4	Fredrik Reite; Ulrik Pharo Lohne	Norway	7:26.04	Q
5	Bakr Al-Dulaimi; Mohammed Al-Khafaji	Iraq	7:33.91	FE

==== Heat 3 ====
Rank	Rower	Country	Time	Notes
1	Melvin Twellaar; Simon van Dorp	Netherlands	6:53.69	QF
2	Jakub Podrazil; Dalibor Neděla	Czech Republic	6:58.03	QF
3	Yi Xudi; Deng Zhiwei	China	7:00.64	QF
4	Oscar McGuinness; Nicholas Blackman	Australia	7:03.17	QF
5	Navdeep Singh; Kulwinder Singh	India	7:29.47	QF

==== Heat 4 ====
Rank	Rower	Country	Time	Notes
1	Martin Mačković; Nikolaj Pimenov	Serbia	7:04.35	QF
2	Aaron Andries; Tibo Vyvey	Belgium	7:08.94	QF
3	Willem Drescher; James Fetter	United States	7:13.29	QF
4	Alper Şevket Eren; Halil Kaan Köroğlu	Turkey	7:15.87	QF
5	Olavo Pelegrino; Breno Ornellas	Brazil	7:27.51	QF

==== Heat 5 ====
Rank	Rower	Country	Time	Notes
1	Valent Sinković; Martin Sinković	Croatia	6:46.35	QF
2	Valentin Onfroy; Yoann Lamiral	France	6:46.95	QF
3	Oliver Holtz; Arno Gaus	Germany	6:50.38	QF
4	Niels Torre; Marco Selva	Italy	7:00.56	QF
5	Christopher Hein; Kaarel Kiiver	Estonia	7:19.33	QF

=== Quarterfinals ===
The three fastest boats in each heat advance to the semifinals. The remaining boats were sent to the Final C and Final D.

==== Quarterfinal 1 ====
Rank	Rower	Country	Time	Notes
1	Martin Mačković; Nikolaj Pimenov	Serbia	6:53.64	SF
2	Aaron Andries; Tibo Vyvey	Belgium	6:57.17	SF
3	Valent Sinković; Martin Sinković	Croatia	7:05.95	SF
4	Willem Drescher; James Fetter	United States	7:09.52	FD
5	Navdeep Singh; Kulwinder Singh	India	7:13.33	FD
6	Erik Bröte; Gustav Arvidsson	Sweden	7:14.71	FD

==== Quarterfinal 2 ====
Rank	Rower	Country	Time	Notes
1	Melvin Twellaar; Simon van Dorp	Netherlands	6:44.95	SF
2	Finlay Hamill; Benjamin Mason	New Zealand	6:47.99	SF
3	Pedro Rodrigues; Tomas Neves	Portugal	6:48.90	SF
4	Alexandr Bulat; Ivan Corsunov	Moldova	6:53.82	FC
5	Valentin Onfroy; Yoann Lamiral	France	6:54.90	FC
6	Olavo Pelegrino; Breno Ornellas	Brazil	6:59.57	FD

==== Quarterfinal 3 ====
Rank	Rower	Country	Time	Notes
1	Jakub Podrazil; Dalibor Neděla	Czech Republic	6:44.74	SF
2	Oliver Holtz; Arno Gaus	Germany	6:45.44	SF
3	Andrei Cornea; Marian Enache	Romania	6:48.40	SF
4	Oscar McGuinness; Nicholas Blackman	Australia	6:55.83	FC
5	Alper Şevket Eren; Halil Kaan Köroğlu	Turkey	7:00.98	FD
6	Fredrik Reite; Ulrik Pharo Lohne	Norway	7:10.39	FD

==== Quarterfinal 4 ====
Rank	Rower	Country	Time	Notes
1	Matt Haywood; Joshua Knight	Great Britain	6:46.16	SF
2	Caetano Horta; Rodrigo Conde	Spain	6:48.57	SF
3	Niels Torre; Marco Selva	Italy	6:49.59	SF
4	Yi Xudi; Deng Zhiwei	China	6:52.85	FC
5	Christopher Hein; Kaarel Kiiver	Estonia	6:55.97	FC
6	Piotr Plomiński; Michał Rańda	Poland	6:59.20	FC

=== Semifinals ===
The three fastest boats in each heat advance to the Final A. The remaining boats were sent to the Final B.

==== Semifinal 1 ====
Rank	Rower	Country	Time	Notes
1	Matt Haywood; Joshua Knight	Great Britain	6:26.53	FA
2	Aaron Andries; Tibo Vyvey	Belgium	6:28.03	FA
3	Jakub Podrazil; Dalibor Neděla	Czech Republic	6:29.23	FA
4	Pedro Rodrigues; Tomas Neves	Portugal	6:30.51	FB
5	Finlay Hamill; Benjamin Mason	New Zealand	6:30.85	FB
6	Niels Torre; Marco Selva	Italy	6:37.84	FB

==== Semifinal 2 ====
Rank	Rower	Country	Time	Notes
1	Melvin Twellaar; Simon van Dorp	Netherlands	6:24.80	FA
2	Martin Mačković; Nikolaj Pimenov	Serbia	6:26.99	FA
3	Caetano Horta; Rodrigo Conde	Spain	6:30.25	FA
4	Valent Sinković; Martin Sinković	Croatia	6:33.64	FB
5	Oliver Holtz; Arno Gaus	Germany	6:36.28	FB
6	Andrei Cornea; Marian Enache	Romania	6:39.81	FB

=== Finals ===
The A final determined the rankings for places 1 to 6. Additional rankings were determined in the other finals.

==== Final E ====
Rank	Rower	Country	Time	Total rank
1	Bakr Al-Dulaimi; Mohammed Al-Khafaji	Iraq	7:33.68	25
2	Amel Younis; Ryan Ghalayini	Palestine	7:40.49	26

==== Final D ====
Rank	Rower	Country	Time	Total rank
1	Willem Drescher; James Fetter	United States	6:46.58	19
2	Olavo Pelegrino; Breno Ornellas	Brazil	6:47.72	20
3	Alper Şevket Eren; Halil Kaan Köroğlu	Turkey	6:49.76	21
4	Fredrik Reite; Ulrik Pharo Lohne	Norway	6:53.95	22
5	Erik Bröte; Gustav Arvidsson	Sweden	6:55.24	23
6	Navdeep Singh; Kulwinder Singh	India	6:56.30	24

==== Final C ====
Rank	Rower	Country	Time	Total rank
1	Piotr Plomiński; Michał Rańda	Poland	6:32.01	13
2	Oscar McGuinness; Nicholas Blackman	Australia	6:35.05	14
3	Alexandr Bulat; Ivan Corsunov	Moldova	6:36.46	15
4	Yi Xudi; Deng Zhiwei	China	6:39.77	16
5	Valentin Onfroy; Yoann Lamiral	France	6:40.25	17
6	Christopher Hein; Kaarel Kiiver	Estonia	6:40.45	18

==== Final B ====
Rank	Rower	Country	Time	Total rank
1	Valent Sinković; Martin Sinković	Croatia	6:08.67	7
2	Pedro Rodrigues; Tomas Neves	Portugal	6:11.44	8
3	Oliver Holtz; Arno Gaus	Germany	6:11.82	9
4	Finlay Hamill; Benjamin Mason	New Zealand	6:13.22	10
5	Niels Torre; Marco Selva	Italy	6:17.37	11
6	Andrei Cornea; Marian Enache	Romania	6:21.94	12

==== Final A ====
Rank	Rower	Country	Time
1st place, gold medalist(s)	Melvin Twellaar; Simon van Dorp	Netherlands	6:04.42
2nd place, silver medalist(s)	Martin Mačković; Nikolaj Pimenov	Serbia	6:07.58
3rd place, bronze medalist(s)	Aaron Andries; Tibo Vyvey	Belgium	6:09.74
4	Caetano Horta; Rodrigo Conde	Spain	6:10.84
5	Matt Haywood; Joshua Knight	Great Britain	6:14.26
6	Jakub Podrazil; Dalibor Neděla	Czech Republic	6:23.74
