= 2026 World Rowing Championships – Mixed double sculls =

Women's quadruple sculls at the 2026 World Rowing Championships
- Venue: Bosbaan
- Location: Amsterdam, Netherlands
- Dates: 29–30 August
- Competitors: 34 from 17 nations
- Winning time: 6:15.80

Medalists
gold medal	Roos de Jong; Simon van Dorp	Netherlands
silver medal	Konan Pazzaia; Margaret Cremen	Ireland
bronze medal	Sophia Vitas; Cedar Cunningham	United States

The mixed double sculls competition at the 2026 World Rowing Championships took place at Bosbaan, in Amsterdam.

== Schedule ==
The schedule was as follows:

Date	Time	Round
Saturday, 29 August 2026	17:05	Heats
Sunday, 30 August 2026	11:20	Semifinals
Sunday, 30 August 2026	11:34	Final C
Sunday, 30 August 2026	14:25	Final B
Sunday, 30 August 2026	15:46	Final A

All times are Central European Summer Time (UTC+2)

== Results ==
=== Heats ===
The two fastest boats in each heat and the six fastest times advanced to the semifinals. Other crews to Final C.

==== Heat 1 ====
Rank	Rower	Country	Time	Notes
1	Konan Pazzaia; Margaret Cremen	Ireland	6:38.64	SF
2	Célia Dupré; Raphaël Ahumada	Switzerland	6:39.17	SF
3	Konrad Hultsch; Lara Tiefenthaler	Austria	6:45.04	SF
4	Sophie Egnot-Johnson; Benjamin Mason	New Zealand	6:50.52	FC
5	Kasper Hirvilampi; Maiju Kainlauri	Finland	7:12.79	FC
6	Marouane Boufrir; Majdouline El Allaoui	Morocco	7:36.60	FC

==== Heat 2 ====
Rank	Rower	Country	Time	Notes
1	Roos de Jong; Simon van Dorp	Netherlands	6:38.48	SF
2	Andrei Cornea; Andrada-Maria Moroșanu	Romania	6:43.20	SF
3	Niels Torre; Sophie Souwer	Italy	6:43.42	SF
4	Jakub Podrazil; Pavlína Flamíková	Czech Republic	6:45.18	SF
5	Alejandra Alonso; Matías Ramírez	Paraguay	7:10.13	FC

==== Heat 3 ====
Rank	Rower	Country	Time	Notes
1	Caetano Horta; Iria Jarama Diaz	Spain	6:43.08	SF
2	Sophia Vitas; Cedar Cunningham	United States	6:43.20	SF
3	Juliane Faralisch; Arno Gaus	Germany	6:44.02	SF
4	Zoltana Gadanyi; Bendegúz Pétervári-Molnár	Hungary	6:48.39	SF
5	Nicole Yarzon; Felipe Klüver	Uruguay	6:49.79	SF

=== Semifinals ===
The three fastest boats in each heat advance to the Final A. The remaining boats were sent to the Final B.

==== Semifinal 1 ====
Rank	Rower	Country	Time	Notes
1	Roos de Jong; Simon van Dorp	Netherlands	6:26.53	FA
2	Caetano Horta; Iria Jarama Diaz	Spain	6:29.09	FA
3	Juliane Faralisch; Arno Gaus	Germany	6:29.68	FA
4	Andrei Cornea; Andrada-Maria Moroșanu	Romania	6:33.85	FB
5	Jakub Podrazil; Pavlína Flamíková	Czech Republic	6:34.20	FB
6	Nicole Yarzon; Felipe Klüver	Uruguay	7:31.48	FB

==== Semifinal 2 ====
Rank	Rower	Country	Time	Notes
1	Sophia Vitas; Cedar Cunningham	United States	6:22.42	FA
2	Célia Dupré; Raphaël Ahumada	Switzerland	6:22.96	FA
3	Konan Pazzaia; Margaret Cremen	Ireland	6:24.63	FA
4	Niels Torre; Sophie Souwer	Italy	6:29.86	FB
5	Zoltana Gadanyi; Bendegúz Pétervári-Molnár	Hungary	6:40.69	FB
6	Konrad Hultsch; Lara Tiefenthaler	Austria	6:44.22	FB

=== Finals ===
The A final determined the rankings for places 1 to 6. Additional rankings were determined in the other finals.

==== Final C ====
Rank	Rower	Country	Time	Total rank
1	Sophie Egnot-Johnson; Benjamin Mason	New Zealand	6:35.01	13
2	Alejandra Alonso; Matías Ramírez	Paraguay	6:52.19	14
3	Kasper Hirvilampi; Maiju Kainlauri	Finland	6:57.84	15
4	Marouane Boufrir; Majdouline El Allaoui	Morocco	7:30.97	16

==== Final B ====
Rank	Rower	Country	Time	Total rank
1	Niels Torre; Sophie Souwer	Italy	6:29.03	7
2	Nicole Yarzon; Felipe Klüver	Uruguay	6:31.28	8
3	Andrei Cornea; Andrada-Maria Moroșanu	Romania	6:32.15	9
4	Zoltana Gadanyi; Bendegúz Pétervári-Molnár	Hungary	6:32.70	10
5	Jakub Podrazil; Pavlína Flamíková	Czech Republic	6:34.32	11
6	Konrad Hultsch; Lara Tiefenthaler	Austria	6:35.05	12

==== Final A ====
Rank	Rower	Country	Time
1st place, gold medalist(s)	Roos de Jong; Simon van Dorp	Netherlands	6:15.80
2nd place, silver medalist(s)	Konan Pazzaia; Margaret Cremen	Ireland	6:22.34
3rd place, bronze medalist(s)	Sophia Vitas; Cedar Cunningham	United States	6:22.75
4	Célia Dupré; Raphaël Ahumada	Switzerland	6:26.56
5	Caetano Horta; Iria Jarama Diaz	Spain	6:27.41
6	Juliane Faralisch; Arno Gaus	Germany	6:31.23
