= Konan Pazzaia =

Irish rower

Personal information
- Nationality: Irish
- Born: 5 July 2001 (age 25) Geneva, Switzerland

Sport
- Country: Ireland
- Sport: Rowing
- Event: Lightweight double sculls
Medal record
Men's rowing
Representing Ireland
World Championships
Silver medal – second place	2026 Amsterdam	Mixed double sculls
European Championships
Bronze medal – third place	2025 Plovdiv	Double sculls
World U23 Championships
Gold medal – first place	2023 Plovdiv	Double sculls
Bronze medal – third place	2022 Varese	Double sculls

Konan Pazzaia (born 5 July 2001) is an Irish rower. He was a bronze medalist at the European Rowing Championships in 2025.

== Early and personal life ==
He was born in Geneva after his mother Sarah Tohill, moved from South Belfast to study for a Ph.D. in organic chemistry and married his father Swiss-Italian Pascal Pazzaia. The family moved to Andilly, France when he was two years-old where they remained until he was 15 years-old when they relocated back to Switzerland. He served mandatory national service in the Swiss military as a Swiss citizen. He took up rowing after being inspired seeing Paul O'Donovan and his brother Gary O'Donovan at the 2016 Rio Olympics. His grandparents Maura and Pearse were both teachers in Belfast and he moved to the city to study for a degree in human biology at Queen's University Belfast. Whilst there, Pazzaia began to train with coach John Armstrong and also trained with future U23 World Champion Ciaran Purdy.

== Career ==
Pazzaia represented Switzerland at the Coupe de la Jeunesse whilst an U19 rower. He won World U23 bronze medal representing Ireland in 2022, and won the gold medal the following year, both alongside Brian Colsh. He trained with Daire Lynch and Phillip Doyle prior to the 2024 Olympic Games and was named as a spare for the boat that went on to win the Olympic bronze medal.

At the European Rowing Championships in Plovdiv in May 2025 he competed in the men's double sculls alongside Olympic champion Fintan McCarthy. They finished second in their semi-final to qualify for the A-final. In the final, they won the bronze medal behind the winning boat from Poland.

Alongside Margaret Cremen, he won the silver medal at the 2026 World Rowing Championships in Amsterdam in the mixed double sculls.
