= Romania at the 2024 Summer Olympics =

- IOC code: ROU
- NOC: Romanian Olympic and Sports Committee
- Website: www.cosr.ro (in Romanian, English, and French)

in Paris, France 26 July 2024 – 11 August 2024
- Competitors: 106 (51 men and 55 women) in 17 sports
- Flag bearers (opening): Marius Cozmiuc & Ionela Cozmiuc
- Flag bearer (closing): Mihaela Cambei
- Medals Ranked 23rd: Gold 3 Silver 4 Bronze 2 Total 9

Summer Olympics appearances (overview)
- 1900; 1904–1920; 1924; 1928; 1932; 1936; 1948; 1952; 1956; 1960; 1964; 1968; 1972; 1976; 1980; 1984; 1988; 1992; 1996; 2000; 2004; 2008; 2012; 2016; 2020; 2024; 2028

Romania competed at the 2024 Summer Olympics in Paris from 26 July to 11 August 2024, celebrating the centenary of the team's official debut in the same venue. Although the nation's participation started in 1900, Romanian athletes have appeared in every edition of the Summer Olympic Games from 1924 onwards, except for two occasions: the 1932 Summer Olympics in Los Angeles during the period of the worldwide Great Depression, and the 1948 Summer Olympics in London because of the nation's role in World War II.

== Medalists ==
Medal	Name	Sport	Event	Date
Gold	David Popovici	Swimming	Men's 200 m freestyle	July 29
Gold	Andrei Cornea; Marian Enache	Rowing	Men's double sculls	August 1
Gold	Adriana Adam; Roxana Anghel; Amalia Bereș; Ancuța Bodnar; Maria Lehaci; Victoria-Ștefania Petreanu; Maria-Magdalena Rusu; Simona Radiș; Ioana Vrînceanu	Rowing	Women's eight	August 3
Silver	Ancuța Bodnar; Simona Radiș	Rowing	Women's double sculls	August 1
Silver	Roxana Anghel; Ioana Vrînceanu	Rowing	Women's coxless pair	August 2
Silver	Ionela Cozmiuc; Gianina van Groningen	Rowing	Women's lightweight double sculls	August 2
Silver	Mihaela Cambei	Weightlifting	Women's 49 kg	August 7
Bronze	David Popovici	Swimming	Men's 100 m freestyle	July 31
Bronze	Ana Bărbosu	Gymnastics	Women's floor	August 5

Medals by sport
Sport	1st place, gold medalist(s)	2nd place, silver medalist(s)	3rd place, bronze medalist(s)	Total
Rowing	2	3	0	5
Swimming	1	0	1	2
Weightlifting	0	1	0	1
Gymnastics	0	0	1	1
Total	3	4	2	9

Medals by date
Day	Date	1st place, gold medalist(s)	2nd place, silver medalist(s)	3rd place, bronze medalist(s)	Total
Day 1	27 July	0	0	0	0
Day 2	28 July	0	0	0	0
Day 3	29 July	1	0	0	1
Day 4	30 July	0	0	0	0
Day 5	31 July	0	0	1	1
Day 6	1 August	1	1	0	2
Day 7	2 August	0	2	0	2
Day 8	3 August	1	0	0	1
Day 9	4 August	0	0	0	0
Day 10	5 August	0	0	1	1
Day 11	6 August	0	0	0	0
Day 12	7 August	0	1	0	1
Day 13	8 August	0	0	0	0
Day 14	9 August	0	0	0	0
Day 15	10 August	0	0	0	0
Day 16	11 August	0	0	0	0
Total		3	4	2	9

Medals by gender
Gender	1st place, gold medalist(s)	2nd place, silver medalist(s)	3rd place, bronze medalist(s)	Total
Male	2	0	1	3
Female	1	4	1	6
Mixed	0	0	0	0
Total	3	4	2	9

Multiple medalists
Name	Sport	1st place, gold medalist(s)	2nd place, silver medalist(s)	3rd place, bronze medalist(s)	Total
Roxana Anghel	Rowing	1	1	0	2
Ancuța Bodnar	Rowing	1	1	0	2
Simona Radiș	Rowing	1	1	0	2
Ioana Vrînceanu	Rowing	1	1	0	2
David Popovici	Swimming	1	0	1	2

== Competitors ==
The following is the list of number of competitors in the Games:

Sport	Men	Women	Total
Archery	0	1	1
Athletics	3	9	12
Boxing	0	1	1
Canoeing	3	0	3
Cycling	1	0	1
Fencing	0	1	1
Gymnastics	1	6	7
Judo	1	0	1
Rowing	22	23	45
Sailing	0	1	1
Swimming	2	1	3
Table tennis	2	3	5
Tennis	0	4	4
Triathlon	1	0	1
Water polo	13	0	13
Weightlifting	0	2	2
Wrestling	2	3	5
Total	51	55	106

== Archery ==
Romania qualified one female archer to compete in the individual recurve event, through the final release of the Olympic ranking for Paris 2024.

Athlete	Event	Ranking round		Round of 64	Round of 32	Round of 16	Quarterfinals	Semifinals	Final / BM	
Athlete	Event	Score	Seed	Opposition Score	Opposition Score	Opposition Score	Opposition Score	Opposition Score	Opposition Score	Rank
Mădălina Amăistroaie	Women's individual	637	47	Moshe (ISR); W 7–1	Rebagliati (ITA); W 7–3	Nam (KOR); L 2–6	Did not advance			

== Athletics ==
Romanian track and field athletes achieved the entry standards for Paris 2024, either by passing the direct qualifying mark (or time for track and road races) or by world ranking, in the following events (a maximum of 3 athletes each):

Key

- Note–Ranks given for track events are within the athlete's heat only
- Q = Qualified for the next round
- q = Qualified for the next round as a fastest loser or, in field events, by position without achieving the qualifying target
- NR = National record
- SB = season's best (the best mark achieved by an athlete on a personal level within a given season)
- N/A = Round not applicable for the event
- Bye = Athlete not required to compete in round

Track and road events

Athlete	Event	Heat		Repechage		Semifinal		Final	
Athlete	Event	Result	Rank	Result	Rank	Result	Rank	Result	Rank
Andrea Miklós	Women's 400 m	50.54	3 Q	Bye		50.78	5	Did not advance	
Stella Rutto	Women's 3000 m steeplechase	9:31.23	8	—N/a				Did not advance	
Delvine Relin Meringor	Women's marathon	—N/a						~~2:24:56~~ SB	~~7~~ DSQ
Joan Chelimo Melly	Women's marathon	—N/a						DNF	

Field events

Athlete	Event	Qualification		Final	
Athlete	Event	Distance	Position	Distance	Position
Alin Alexandru Firfirică	Men's discus throw	63.66	11 q	64.45	11
Andrei Rareș Toader	Men's shot put	20.24	18	Did not advance	
Alexandru Novac	Men's javelin throw	81.08	17	Did not advance	
Daniela Stanciu	Women's high jump	1.88	19	Did not advance	
Alina Rotaru	Women's long jump	6.63	9 q	6.67	7
Diana Ana Maria Ion	Women's triple jump	14.03	13	Did not advance	
Elena Andreea Taloș	Women's triple jump	14.23	9 q	14.03	10
Bianca Ghelber	Women's hammer throw	71.42	11 q	72.36	9

== Boxing ==
Romania entered one boxer into the Olympic tournament. Lenuța Perijoc scored an outright quarterfinal victory to secure a spot in the women's bantamweight division at the 2023 European Games in Nowy Targ, Poland.

Athlete	Event	Round of 32	Round of 16	Quarterfinals	Semifinals	Final	
Athlete	Event	Opposition Result	Opposition Result	Opposition Result	Opposition Result	Opposition Result	Rank
Lăcrămioara Perijoc	Women's 54 kg	Bye	Enkhjargal (MGL); L 1–4	Did not advance			

== Canoeing ==
=== Sprint ===
Romanian canoeists qualified two boats in each of the following distances for the Games through the 2023 ICF Canoe Sprint World Championships in Duisburg, Germany.

Athlete	Event	Heats		Quarterfinals		Semifinals		Final	
Athlete	Event	Time	Rank	Time	Rank	Time	Rank	Time	Rank
Cătălin Chirilă	Men's C-1 1000 m	3:44.75	1	Bye		3:45.78	5 FB	3:47.48	9
Oleg Nuță; Ilie Sprîncean	Men's C-2 500 m	1:40.84	5	1:40.00	2	1:43.42	5 FB	1:43.80	9

Qualification Legend: FA = Qualify to final (medal); FB = Qualify to final B (non-medal)

== Cycling ==
=== Mountain biking ===
Romanian mountain bikers secured one men's quota place for the Olympic through the release of the final Olympic mountain biking rankings.

Athlete	Event	Time	Rank
Ede-Károly Molnár	Men's cross-country	Did not finish	

== Fencing ==
Romania entered one fencer into the Olympic competition. Mălina Călugăreanu qualified for the games by winning the 2024 Europe Zonal Qualifying Tournament in Differdange, Luxembourg.

Athlete	Event	Round of 64	Round of 32	Round of 16	Quarterfinal	Semifinal	Final / BM	
Athlete	Event	Opposition Score	Opposition Score	Opposition Score	Opposition Score	Opposition Score	Opposition Score	Rank
Mălina Călugăreanu	Women's foil	Bye	Ueno (JPN); W 15–13	Volpi (ITA); L 9–15	Did not advance			

== Gymnastics ==
=== Artistic ===
For women's artistic gymnastics, Romania fielded a squad of five gymnasts for Paris after being one of the top nine teams during qualifications at the 2023 World Championships that have not yet qualified a full team. For men's artistic gymnastics, Andrei Muntean earned a nominative berth by being among the highest-ranked eligible athletes in the all-around at the 2023 World Championships.

Men

Athlete	Event	Qualification								Final							
Athlete	Event	Apparatus						Total	Rank	Apparatus						Total	Rank
Athlete	Event	F	PH	R	V	PB	HB	Total	Rank	F	PH	R	V	PB	HB	Total	Rank
Andrei Muntean	Parallel bars	—N/a				14.366	—N/a	14.366	25	Did not advance							

Women
Team

Athlete	Event	Qualification						Final					
Athlete	Event	Apparatus				Total	Rank	Apparatus				Total	Rank
Athlete	Event	V	UB	BB	F	Total	Rank	V	UB	BB	F	Total	Rank
Ana Bărbosu	Team	13.800	12.600	13.533	13.600 Q	53.533	14 Q	13.933	12.433	12.700	13.566	—N/a	
Lilia Cosman	Team	13.500	11.333	~~12.833~~	~~12.466~~	50.132	50	13.433	13.133	—N/a		—N/a	
Amalia Ghigoarță	Team	~~13.000~~	13.066	13.266	13.333	52.665	19 Q	—N/a	13.333	12.500	13.133	—N/a	
Andreea Preda	Team	—N/a	~~10.933~~	—N/a				—N/a				—N/a	
Sabrina Voinea	Team	13.666	—N/a	14.000 Q	13.800 Q	—N/a		13.633	—N/a	13.800	13.900	—N/a	
Total	Team	40.966	36.999	40.799	40.733	159.497	8 Q	40.999	38.899	39.000	40.599	159.497	7

Individual finals

Athlete	Event	Qualification						Final					
Athlete	Event	Apparatus				Total	Rank	Apparatus				Total	Rank
Athlete	Event	V	UB	BB	F	Total	Rank	V	UB	BB	F	Total	Rank
Ana Bărbosu	All-around	See team results above						14.000	12.433	12.466	13.566	52.465	17
Amalia Ghigoarță	All-around	See team results above						13.100	12.566	11.900	13.166	50.732	22
Sabrina Voinea	Balance beam	—N/a		14.000	—N/a	14.000	5 Q	—N/a		11.733	—N/a	11.733	8
Ana Bărbosu	Floor	—N/a			13.600	13.600	8 Q	—N/a			13.700	13.700	(bronze)
Sabrina Voinea	Floor	—N/a			13.800	13.800	4 Q	—N/a			13.700	13.700	4

=== Rhythmic ===
Romania entered one rhythmic gymnast into the individual all-around tournament by virtue of top fifteen eligible nation's results at the 2023 World Championships in Valencia, Spain.

Athlete	Event	Qualification						Final					
Athlete	Event	Hoop	Ball	Clubs	Ribbon	Total	Rank	Hoop	Ball	Clubs	Ribbon	Total	Rank
Annaliese Drăgan	Individual	27.200	30.550	31.650	25.450	114.850	21	Did not advance					

== Judo ==
Men

Athlete	Event	Round of 32	Round of 16	Quarterfinals	Semifinals	Repechage	Final / BM	
Athlete	Event	Opposition Result	Opposition Result	Opposition Result	Opposition Result	Opposition Result	Opposition Result	Rank
Alex Creț	Men's 90 kg	Tóth (HUN); W 10–0	Macedo (BRA); L 0–10	Did not advance				

== Rowing ==
Romanian rowers qualified boats in each of the following classes through the 2023 World Rowing Championships in Belgrade, Serbia and 2024 Final Qualification Regatta in Lucerne, Switzerland.

Men

Athlete	Event	Heats		Repechage		Quarterfinals		Semifinals		Final	
Athlete	Event	Time	Rank	Time	Rank	Time	Rank	Time	Rank	Time	Rank
Mihai Chiruță	Men's single sculls	6:51.51	1 QF	Bye		6:46.32	3 SA/B	6:52.95	5 FB	6:44.83	7
Andrei-Sebastian Cornea; Marian Enache	Double sculls	6:16.47	1 SA/B	Bye		—N/a		6:15.73	3 FA	6:12.58	1st place, gold medalist(s)
Florin Horodișteanu; Andrei Lungu; Iliuță-Leontin Nuțescu; Ioan Prundeanu	Quadruple sculls	5:51.14	5 R	5:56.32	5 FB	—N/a				5:54.77	9
Florin Arteni; Florin Lehaci	Coxless pair	6:40.29	2 SA/B	Bye		—N/a		6:29.86	1 FA	6:25.61	4
Sergiu Bejan; Ștefan Berariu; Andrei Mândrilă; Ciprian Tudosă	Coxless four	6:06.60	3 R	5:53.52	2 FA	—N/a				5:56.85	5
Constantin Adam; Bogdan Baitoc; Ștefan Berariu; Marius Cozmiuc; Florin Lehaci; Claudiu Neamțu; Mugurel Semciuc; Mihăiță Țigănescu; Adrian Munteanu (cox)	Eight	5:55.82	4 R	5:30.00	3 FA	—N/a				5:30.15	5

Women

Athlete	Event	Heats		Repechage		Semifinals		Final	
Athlete	Event	Time	Rank	Time	Rank	Time	Rank	Time	Rank
Ionela Cozmiuc; Gianina van Groningen	Lightweight double sculls	7:03.83	1 SA/B	Bye		6:56.65	1 FA	6:48.78	2nd place, silver medalist(s)
Ancuța Bodnar; Simona Radiș	Double sculls	6:48.49	1 SA/B	Bye		6:51.41	1 FA	6:50.69	2nd place, silver medalist(s)
Emanuela-Ioana Ciotău; Patricia Cireș; Ioana-Madalina Moroșan; Alexandra Ungureanu	Quadruple sculls	6:24.74	4 R	6:33.84	4 FB	—N/a		6:29.64	7
Roxana Anghel; Ioana Vrînceanu	Coxless pair	7:24.27	1 SA/B	Bye		7:14.53	2 FA	7:02.97	2nd place, silver medalist(s)
Adriana Adam; Amalia Bereș; Maria Lehaci; Maria-Magdalena Rusu	Coxless four	6:44.55	2 FA	Bye		—N/a		6:29.52	4
Adriana Adam; Roxana Anghel; Amalia Bereș; Ancuța Bodnar; Maria Lehaci; Maria-Magdalena Rusu; Simona Radiș; Ioana Vrînceanu; Victoria-Ștefania Petreanu (cox)	Eight	6:12.31	1 FA	Bye		—N/a		5:54.39	1st place, gold medalist(s)

Qualification Legend: FA=Final A (medal); FB=Final B (non-medal); FC=Final C (non-medal); FD=Final D (non-medal); FE=Final E (non-medal); FF=Final F (non-medal); SA/B=Semifinals A/B; SC/D=Semifinals C/D; SE/F=Semifinals E/F; QF=Quarterfinals; R=Repechage

== Sailing ==
Romanian sailors qualified one boat in each of the following classes through the 2024 Last Chance Regatta in Hyères.

Medal race events

Athlete	Event	Race											Net points	Final rank
Athlete	Event	1	2	3	4	5	6	7	8	9	10	M*	Net points	Final rank
Ebru Bolat	Women's ILCA 6	28	16	32	5	14	21	24	26	24	Cancelled	EL	158	23

M = Medal race; EL = Eliminated – did not advance into the medal race

== Swimming ==
Romanian swimmers achieved the entry standards in the following events for Paris 2024 (a maximum of two swimmers under the Olympic Qualifying Time (OST) and potentially at the Olympic Consideration Time (OCT)): Popovici won Romania's first gold medal in men's swimming at the Olympic Games.

Men

Athlete	Event	Heat		Semifinal		Final	
Athlete	Event	Time	Rank	Time	Rank	Time	Rank
David Popovici	100 m freestyle	47.92	3 Q	47.66	5 Q	47.49	3rd place, bronze medalist(s)
David Popovici	200 m freestyle	1:45.65	1Q	1:44.53	1Q	1:44.72	1st place, gold medalist(s)
Vlad Stancu	800 m freestyle	8:20.78	30	—N/a		Did not advance	
Vlad Stancu	1500 m freestyle	Did not start					

Women

Athlete	Event	Heat		Semifinal		Final	
Athlete	Event	Time	Rank	Time	Rank	Time	Rank
Rebecca Diaconescu	200 m freestyle	1:59.29	16 Q	1:59.58	16	Did not advance	

== Table tennis ==
Romania entered a full squad of female table tennis player into the Games, by advancing to the quarter-finals round, through the 2024 World Team Table Tennis Championships in Busan, South Korea. The nations also entered a mixed doubles pair into the games through the allocations of world ranking; and two men's singles players (Ovidiu Ionescu and Eduard Ionescu) through the release of the final world ranking.

Athlete	Event	Preliminary	Round 1	Round 2	Round of 16	Quarterfinals	Semifinals	Final / BM	
Athlete	Event	Opposition Result	Opposition Result	Opposition Result	Opposition Result	Opposition Result	Opposition Result	Opposition Result	Rank
Ovidiu Ionescu	Men's singles	Bye	Gaćina (CRO); L 1–4	Did not advance					
Eduard Ionescu	Men's singles	Bye	Aruna (NGR); W 4–3	Kao (TPE); L 1–4	Did not advance				
Bernadette Szőcs	Women's singles	Bye	Zhou (SGP); W 4–1	Pesotska (UKR); W 4–1	Polcanova (AUT); L 0–4	Did not advance			
Elizabeta Samara	Women's singles	Bye	Brateyko (UKR); W 4–3	Cheng (TPE); L 2–4	Did not advance				
Adina Diaconu; Elizabeta Samara; Bernadette Szőcs	Women's team	—N/a			India; L 2–3	Did not advance			
Ovidiu Ionescu; Bernadette Szőcs	Mixed doubles	—N/a			Lum / Jee (AUS); W 4–1	Lim (KOR); Shin (KOR); L 0–4	Did not advance		

== Tennis ==
Romania entered four tennis players into the Olympic tournament. None advanced to the final rounds.

Athlete	Event	Round of 64	Round of 32	Round of 16	Quarterfinals	Semifinals	Final / BM	
Athlete	Event	Opposition Score	Opposition Score	Opposition Score	Opposition Score	Opposition Score	Opposition Score	Rank
Irina-Camelia Begu	Women's singles	Świątek (POL); L 2–6, 5–7	Did not advance					
Ana Bogdan	Women's singles	Paolini (ITA); L 5–7, 3–6	Did not advance					
Jaqueline Cristian	Women's singles	Garcia (FRA); W 5–7, 6–3, 6–3	Kerber (GER); L 4–6, 6–3, 4–6	Did not advance				
Irina-Camelia Begu; Monica Niculescu	Women's doubles	—N/a	Hsieh / Tsao (TPE); L 6–7^{(2–7)}, 5–7	Did not advance				
Ana Bogdan; Jaqueline Cristian	Women's doubles	—N/a	Aoyama / Shibahara (JPN); L 2–6, 3–6	Did not advance				

== Triathlon ==
Romania entered one triathlete to compete at the Olympics for the second time in history. French-born Felix Duchampt topped the field of triathletes vying for qualification from Europe in the men's event based on the final release of individual ITU World Rankings.

Athlete	Event	Time						Rank
Athlete	Event	Swim (1.5 km)	Trans 1	Bike (40 km)	Trans 2	Run (10 km)	Total	Rank
Felix Duchampt	Men's	23:05	0:50	56:35	0:30	35:00	1:56:00	50

== Water polo ==
Summary

Key:
- FT – After full time.
- P – Match decided by penalty-shootout.

Team	Event	Group stage						Quarterfinal	Semifinal	Final / BM	
Team	Event	Opposition Score	Opposition Score	Opposition Score	Opposition Score	Opposition Score	Rank	Opposition Score	Opposition Score	Opposition Score	Rank
Romania men's	Men's tournament	Greece; L 7–14	United States; L 8–14	Croatia; L 8–11	Italy; L 7–18	Montenegro; L 7–10	6	Did not advance			12

=== Men's tournament ===
Romania men's national water polo team qualified for the Olympics, after South Africa withdrew.

Team roster

The roster was announced on 10 July 2024.

Head coach: Bogdan Rath

- 1 Marius Țic (c) GK
- 2 Francesco Iudean CB
- 3 Matei Luțescu CB
- 4 Tudor Fulea D
- 5 Andrei Neamțu W
- 6 Andrei Prioteasa W
- 7 Andrei Țepeluș CB
- 8 Nicolae Oanță CB
- 9 Silvian Colodrovschi CF
- 10 Vlad Georgescu D
- 11 Sebastian Oltean D
- 12 Levente Vancsik CF
- 13 Mihai Drăgușin GK

Group play

Pos	Team	Pld	W	PSW	PSL	L	GF	GA	GD	Pts	Qualification
1	Greece	5	3	1	0	1	61	52	+9	11 (Note: Greece 9–8 Italy)	Quarterfinals
2	Italy	5	3	1	0	1	60	43	+17	11	Quarterfinals
3	United States	5	3	0	0	2	59	51	+8	9 (Note: Croatia 11–14 United States)	Quarterfinals
4	Croatia	5	3	0	0	2	58	57	+1	9	Quarterfinals
5	Montenegro	5	1	0	2	2	45	50	−5	5	
6	Romania	5	0	0	0	5	37	67	−30	0	

Source: Olympics
Rules for classification: 1) Points; 2) Head-to-head points; 3) Head-to-head goal difference; 4) Head-to-head goals scored; 5) Goal difference.
Notes:

28 July 2024; 21:05 v	Report	Romania	7–14	Greece	Paris Aquatic Centre, Paris; Referees: Michiel Zwart (NED), Zhang Liang (CHN)
28 July 2024; 21:05 v	Report	Score by quarters: 2–4, 3–5, 1–2, 1–3			Paris Aquatic Centre, Paris; Referees: Michiel Zwart (NED), Zhang Liang (CHN)
28 July 2024; 21:05 v	Report	Georgescu, Neamțu 2	Goals	Argyropoulos 4	Paris Aquatic Centre, Paris; Referees: Michiel Zwart (NED), Zhang Liang (CHN)

30 July 2024; 16:35 v	Report	United States	14–8	Romania	Paris Aquatic Centre, Paris; Referees: David Gómez (ESP), Nicholas Hodgers (AUS)
30 July 2024; 16:35 v	Report	Score by quarters: 3–3, 3–0, 4–1, 4–4			Paris Aquatic Centre, Paris; Referees: David Gómez (ESP), Nicholas Hodgers (AUS)
30 July 2024; 16:35 v	Report	Bowen, Daube 3	Goals	Colodrovschi, Georgescu 3	Paris Aquatic Centre, Paris; Referees: David Gómez (ESP), Nicholas Hodgers (AUS)

1 August 2024; 19:30 v	Report	Romania	8–11	Croatia	Paris Aquatic Centre, Paris; Referees: Tamás Kovács (HUN), Chisato Kurosaki (JPN)
1 August 2024; 19:30 v	Report	Score by quarters: 0–3, 3–3, 4–5, 1–0			Paris Aquatic Centre, Paris; Referees: Tamás Kovács (HUN), Chisato Kurosaki (JPN)
1 August 2024; 19:30 v	Report	Fulea, Țepeluș 2	Goals	three players 2	Paris Aquatic Centre, Paris; Referees: Tamás Kovács (HUN), Chisato Kurosaki (JPN)

3 August 2024; 21:05 v	Report	Italy	18–7	Romania	Paris Aquatic Centre, Paris; Referees: Tamás Kovács (HUN), Nicholas Hodgers (AUS)
3 August 2024; 21:05 v	Report	Score by quarters: 6–2, 4–1, 5–1, 3–3			Paris Aquatic Centre, Paris; Referees: Tamás Kovács (HUN), Nicholas Hodgers (AUS)
3 August 2024; 21:05 v	Report	three players 3	Goals	Colodrovschi 3	Paris Aquatic Centre, Paris; Referees: Tamás Kovács (HUN), Nicholas Hodgers (AUS)

5 August 2024; 21:40 v	Report	Romania	7–10	Montenegro	Paris La Défense Arena, Paris; Referees: Boris Margeta (SLO), Yasser Mehalhel (EGY)
5 August 2024; 21:40 v	Report	Score by quarters: 3–3, 1–2, 1–2, 2–3			Paris La Défense Arena, Paris; Referees: Boris Margeta (SLO), Yasser Mehalhel (EGY)
5 August 2024; 21:40 v	Report	Fulea 2	Goals	Mršić 3	Paris La Défense Arena, Paris; Referees: Boris Margeta (SLO), Yasser Mehalhel (EGY)

== Weightlifting ==
Romania entered two weightlifters into the Olympic competition. Mihaela Cambei (women's 49 kg) and Loredana Toma (women's 71 kg), secured one of the top ten slots in their respective weight divisions based on the IWF Olympic Qualification Rankings.

Athlete	Event	Snatch		Clean & jerk		Total	Rank
Athlete	Event	Result	Rank	Result	Rank	Total	Rank
Mihaela Cambei	Women's −49 kg	93 kg	1	112 kg	3	205	2nd place, silver medalist(s)
Loredana Toma	Women's −71 kg	115 kg	3	~~134~~	–	–	DNF

== Wrestling ==
Romania entered five wrestlers into the Olympic competition. Andreea Ana qualified for the games by winning the semifinal match at the 2024 European Qualification Tournament in Baku, Azerbaijan; meanwhile Alin Alexuc-Ciurariu, Kriszta Incze and Cătălina Axente qualified for the games through the 2024 World Qualification Tournament in Istanbul, Turkey, then Răzvan Arnăut joined the squads due to reallocations of Individual Neutral Athletes (AIN)claimed by the IOC.

Key:

- VT (ranking points: 5–0 or 0–5) – Victory by fall.
- VB (ranking points: 5–0 or 0–5) – Victory by injury (VF for forfeit, VA for withdrawal or disqualification)
- PP (ranking points: 3–1 or 1–3) – Decision by points – the loser with technical points.
- PO (ranking points: 3–0 or 0–3) – Decision by points – the loser without technical points.
- ST (ranking points: 4–0 or 0–4) – Great superiority – the loser without technical points and a margin of victory of at least 8 (Greco-Roman) or 10 (freestyle) points.
- SP (ranking points: 4–1 or 1–4) – Technical superiority – the loser with technical points and a margin of victory of at least 8 (Greco-Roman) or 10 (freestyle) points.

Men's Greco-Roman

Athlete	Event	Round of 16	Quarterfinal	Semifinal	Repechage	Final / BM	
Athlete	Event	Opposition Result	Opposition Result	Opposition Result	Opposition Result	Opposition Result	Rank
Răzvan Arnăut	Men's –60 kg	Başar (TUR); W 3–1 ^{PP}	Sharshenbekov (KGZ); L 0–4 ^{ST}	Did not advance			9
Alin Alexuc-Ciurariu	Men's –130 kg	Syzdykov (KAZ); L 1–3 ^{PP}	Did not advance				11

Women's freestyle

Athlete	Event	Round of 16	Quarterfinal	Semifinal	Repechage	Final / BM	
Athlete	Event	Opposition Result	Opposition Result	Opposition Result	Opposition Result	Opposition Result	Rank
Andreea Ana	Women's −53 kg	Drăguțan (MDA); W 3–0 ^{PO}	Yépez (ECU); L 0–5 ^{VT}	Did not advance	Hyo-gyong (PRK); L 0–4 ^{ST}	Did not advance	9
Kriszta Incze	Women's −62 kg	Motoki (JPN); L 0–5 ^{VT}	Did not advance		Godinez (CAN); L 0–3 ^{PO}	Did not advance	16
Cătălina Axente	Women's −76 kg	Blades (USA); L 0–4 ^{ST}	Did not advance		Marín (CUB); L 0–5 ^{VB}	Did not advance	16

== See also ==
- Romania at the 2024 Winter Youth Olympics
- Romania at the 2024 Summer Paralympics
