= David Bartholot =

Australian representative rower

Dave Bartholot
Personal information
- Full name: David Bartholot
- Born: 26 September 1995 (age 30)
- Education: St Andrew's College
- Years active: 2015–current
- Height: 196 cm (6 ft 5 in)
- Weight: 93 kg (205 lb)

Sport
- Sport: Rowing
- Club: Sydney University Boat Club

Achievements and titles
- National finals: President's Cup Winner 2022
Medal record
Men's rowing
Representing Australia
World Championships
Bronze medal – third place	2022 Račice	Double sculls

David Bartholot (born 26 September 1995) is an Australian representative rower. He is a four time Australian national champion and World Championship medalist.

== Club and state rowing ==
Bartholot was raised in Forster on the New South Wales Mid North Coast. He started rowing at Sydney University where he commenced studies in 2015. He was a resident at St Andrew's College and his senior club rowing has been from the Sydney University Boat Club.

In 2018 in SUBC colours Bartholot contested the open men's single and double scull titles at the Australian Rowing Championships. In 2019 he contested the open men's single scull and won the open's men's quad scull national championship title in an SUBC/ANU composite crew. He won another open's men's quad scull national title in 2022 and that year was also selected as NSW's single sculling entrant, racing to victory in the President's Cup at the 2022 Interstate Regatta. In 2023 he was again selected as NSW's single scull representative at the Interstate Regatta.

== International representative rowing ==
Bartholot made his Australian representative debut in 2019. He was selected to race a double scull with Luke Letcher at the World Rowing Cup II in Poznan where they placed nineteenth. At the WRC III in Rotterdam he rowed a single scull and placed twelfth. Bartholot and Caleb Antill were selected to race Australia's double scull at the 2019 World Rowing Championships in Linz, Austria. The double were looking for a top eleven finish at the 2019 World Championships to qualify for the Tokyo Olympics. They were second in their heat, third in their quarter-final and fourth in their semi-final. They finished sixth in the B-final for an overall twelfth world place and failed to qualify the boat for Tokyo 2020.

Bartholot was selected in the Australian men's sculling squad for the 2022 international season and the 2022 World Rowing Championships. Racing with Caleb Antill in the double, Bartolot won silver at the World Rowing Cup III in Lucerne. At the 2022 World Rowing Championships at Racize, he raced with Antill in Australia's representative double scull. They qualified for the A final and raced to a third place and a bronze medal at the World Championships.

In March 2023 Antill and Bartholot were selected as Australian men's sculling squad for the 2023 international season. At the Rowing World Cup II in Varese, Italy with Campbell Watts and Cormac Kennedy-Leverett they raced as Australia's M4X entrant. They made the A final but an injury to Bartholot resulted in his replacement in the final by Henry Youl. At 2023's RWC III in Lucerne, Bartholot was back in the boat to again race as Australia's M4X. Again they made the A final and in a photo finish for the bronze medal, they finished behind Romania in fourth place. At the 2023 World Rowing Championships in Belgrade Serbia, Bartholot, Youl, Antill and Jack Cleary were selected to race Australia's quad scull. They placed third in their heat and then won their repechage to progress to the A/B semifinals. Ultimately they finished third in the B final for an overall ninth place world ranking. This result did not qualify the boat for the 2024 Paris Olympics.
