= Cormac Kennedy-Leverett =

Australian rower (born 2000)

Personal information
- Nationality: Australian
- Born: 28 March 2000 (age 26)

Sport
- Country: Australia
- Sport: Rowing
Medal record
Men's rowing
Representing Australia
Junior World Championships
Gold medal – first place	2017 Trakai	Double sculls

Cormac Kennedy-Leverett (born 28 March 2000) is an Australian representative rower. He was a 2017 Junior World Champion, has represented at U23 World Championships and made the Australian senior squad in 2023.

== Club and state rowing ==
Kennedy-Leverett attended The Southport School on the Gold Coast in Queensland where he took up rowing. His senior club rowing has been from Griffith University's Surfers Paradise Rowing Club.

He first made Queensland state selection in the 2018 youth eight which competed for the Noel Wilkinson Trophy at the Interstate Regatta within the Australian Rowing Championships. In 2019 he was selected in the Queensland men's senior eight to contest the King's Cup. He made further King's Cup selections for Queensland in 2021 and 2022.

From 2020 to 2022 Kennedy-Leverett attended the University of Washington. He stroked the freshman VIII in his first year and rowed in the second varsity eight at the 2021 Head of the Charles Regatta.

In GUSPRC colours he won back-to-back national U23 single-scull championship titles at the 2021 and 2022 Australian Rowing Championships. He also contested the national double-scull and quad-scull titles in 2021 and an U23 M8+ championship in 2022.

== International representative rowing ==
Kennedy-Leverett's Australian representative debut came in 2017 when he was selected in a double-scull to contest the Junior World Rowing Championships in Trakai, Lithuania. Racing with Fergus Hamilton they won their heat, semi-final and the final to take Junior World Championship title. The following year Kennedy-Leverett again raced at the Junior World Rowing Championships this time as Australia's single sculler where he won the silver medal. He was then selected to contest the 2018 Youth Olympics in Buenos Aires Argentina. He raced the single-scull and won a bronze medal.

In 2019 and in 2022 he raced as a single-sculler for Australia at U23 World Championships. He finished sixth overall in 2019 and fourth in 2022.

In March 2023 Kennedy-Leverett was selected in Australian men's sculling squad for the 2023 international season. At the Rowing World Cup II in Varese, Italy with Caleb Antill, David Bartholot and Campbell Watts they raced as Australia's M4X entrant. They made the A final and with Bartholot changed out for Henry Youl they finished in sixth place. At 2023's RWC III in Lucerne, with Bartholot back in the boat they again raced the M4X. Again they made the A final and in a photo finish for the bronze medal, they finished behind Romania in fourth. For the 2023 World Rowing Championships in Belgrade Serbia, Kennedy-Leverett was out of the Australian quad but was selected with Harley Moore to race Australia's double scull. They placed 5th in their heat but rowed to 2nd place in the repechage to proceed through to the quarter-finals. Ultimately they finished 3rd in D final for an overall 21st place world ranking from the regatta.
