= Melvin Twellaar =

Dutch rower (born 1996)

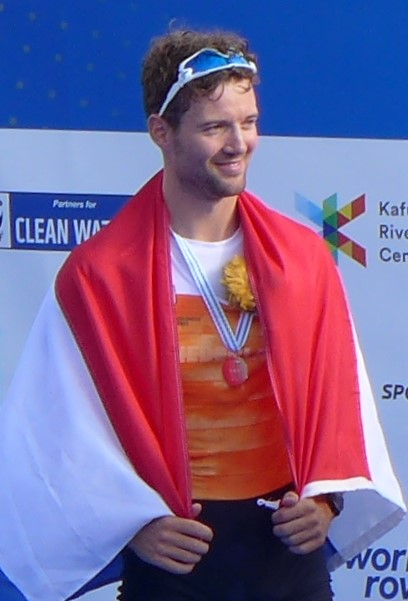
- Twellaar in Račice, 2022

Personal information
- Nationality: Dutch
- Born: 23 December 1996 (age 29) Den Horn, Netherlands

Sport
- Country: Netherlands
- Sport: Rowing
Medal record
Men's rowing
Representing Netherlands
Olympic Games
Silver medal – second place	2020 Tokyo	Double sculls
Silver medal – second place	2024 Paris	Double sculls
World Championships
Gold medal – first place	2023 Belgrade	Double sculls
Gold medal – first place	2026 Amsterdam	Double sculls
Silver medal – second place	2022 Račice	Single sculls
Silver medal – second place	2025 Shanghai	Mixed double sculls
Bronze medal – third place	2025 Shanghai	Coxless four
European Championships
Gold medal – first place	2020 Poznań	Double sculls
Gold medal – first place	2022 Munich	Single sculls
Silver medal – second place	2021 Varese	Double sculls
Bronze medal – third place	2023 Bled	Double sculls
World Rowing U23 Championships
Silver medal – second place	2018 Poznań	Double sculls

Melvin Twellaar (born 23 December 1996) is a Dutch rower – an Olympian and a 2023 world champion. With Stef Broenink, he won the silver medal at the 2020 Summer Olympics in the double sculls event. He was still rowing the double scull with Broenink when they won gold in that boat at the 2023 World Rowing Championships.
