= Nikolaj Pimenov =

Serbian rower (born 1997)

Personal information
- Nationality: Serbian
- Born: 31 January 1997 (age 29)

Sport
- Country: Serbia
- Sport: Rowing
- Event: Double sculls
Medal record
Men's rowing
Representing Serbia
World Championships
Silver medal – second place	2025 Shanghai	Double sculls
Silver medal – second place	2026 Amsterdam	Double sculls
European Championships
Gold medal – first place	2026 Varese	Double sculls
Mediterranean Games
Gold medal – first place	2026 Taranto	Double sculls

Nikolaj Pimenov (born 31 January 1997) is a Serbian rower. He represented Serbia at the 2024 Summer Olympics.

== Career ==
In April 2024, he qualified to represent Serbia at the 2024 Summer Olympics. He won the single sculls at the European Qualification Regatta, but declined the Olympic slot after also qualifying in the double sculls at the Final Olympic Qualification Regatta.

In September 2025, Pimenov competed at the 2025 World Rowing Championships and won a silver medal in the double sculls along with Martin Mačković with a time of 6:13.57.

In August 2026, he competed at the 2026 European Rowing Championships and won a gold medal in the double sculls with a time of 6:04.45. Later that month he competed at the 2026 World Rowing Championships and won a silver medal in the double sculls with a time of 6:07.58.
