= Den Horn =

Den Horn Den Hörn (Gronings)
- Village
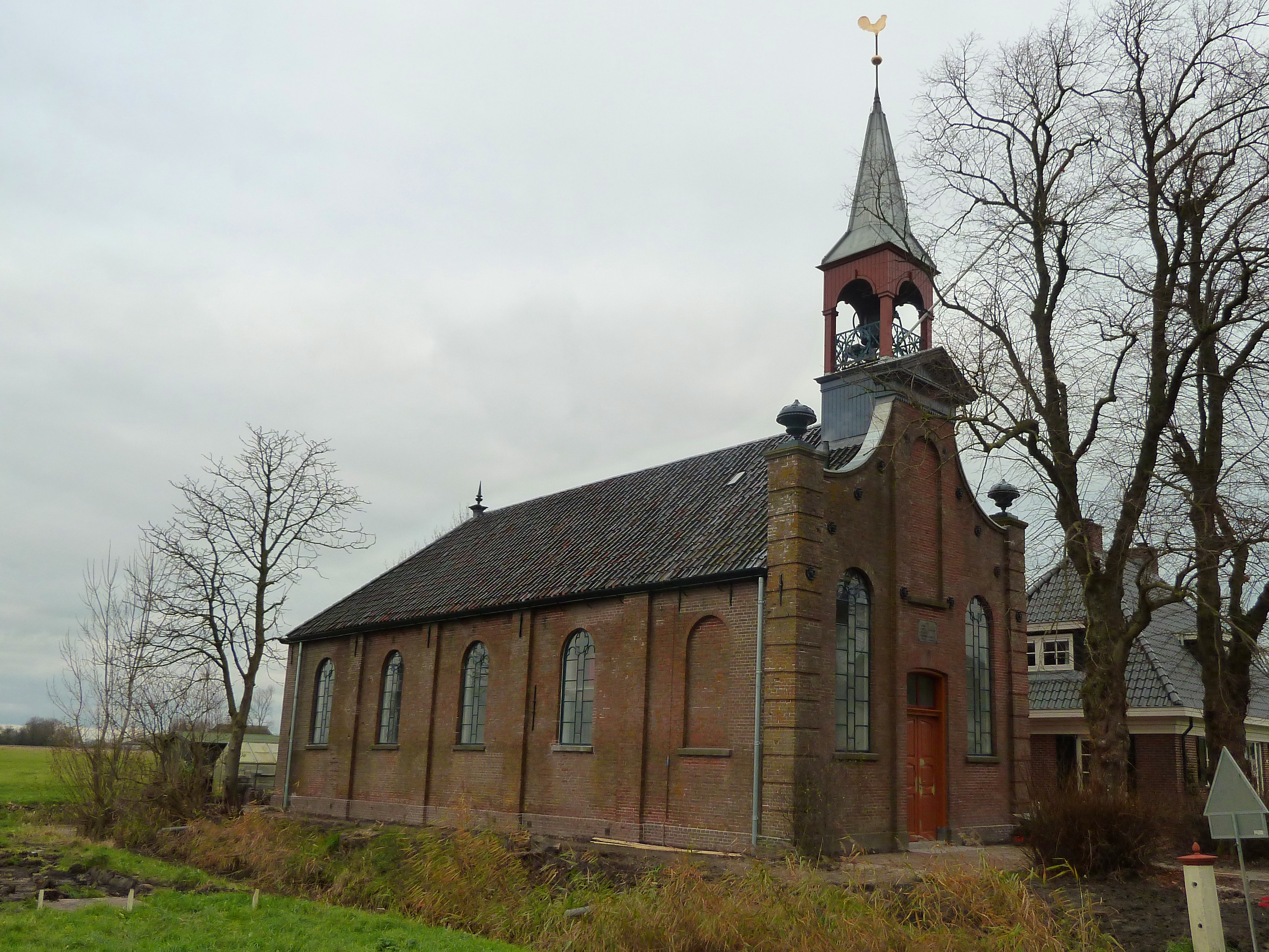
- Church of Den Horn

- Location in the province of Groningen in the Netherlands Den Horn (Netherlands)
- Coordinates: 53.22659°N 6.44121°E
- Country: Netherlands
- Province: Groningen
- Municipality: Westerkwartier
- Elevation: 0.3 m (0.98 ft)

Population (2021)
  - Total: 710
- Time zone: UTC+1 (CET)
  - Summer (DST): UTC+2 (CEST)
- Postcode: 9832
- Area code: 050

Den Horn (Dutch: [dɛn ˈɦɔr(ə)n]; Gronings: Den Hörn) is a small village in the municipality of Westerkwartier in the province of Groningen in the Netherlands. The village is quite isolated in the east of the municipality, just south of the railway line between Groningen and Leeuwarden. As of 2021, it had a population of 710. East of the village used to be the stopping place Den Horn.

== History ==
Den Horn is a relatively young village. It was created around 1700 along a dike. The name Horn probably refers to 'height' or 'angle'. The original village arose in the southwest corner of the embankment. Until January 1, 2019, the village belonged to the municipality of Zuidhorn.

=== Churches ===
In the area, in the village of Lagemeeden, there was already a church during the Middle Ages, but that stood on its own in the country. The old church was demolished in 1862, after which a new church was built in the village the following year in an eclectic style. Since then, the village has developed more to the west of the church, so that the church is now more or less separate from the village. Services were held in the church until 1981. In 2010, the restoration of the church was started, which should be given a multifunctional purpose.

From 1650 there was also a Mennonite congregation in the village known as 'orthodox'. A vermaning was built in 1735; originally there was a plan to build this building near Zuidhorn, but Mr van Hanckema refused this. The lord of Aduard was in need of money and reluctantly agreed to grant a building permit for 100 guilders, provided that the vermaning did not look like a church from the outside. In 1861, a new vermaning was taken into use (at Dorpstraat 62). In 1968, the Mennonite congregation merged with that of Noordhorn. It became a carpenter's workshop in 1970. Since then, this building has been used as a barn. Since 2018, the vermaning has been used as a residence and has become a municipal monument. The sexton next door was later demolished. The organ was sold to organ builder J.J. Harkema from Zuidhorn. The parsonage is still there.

== Gallery ==
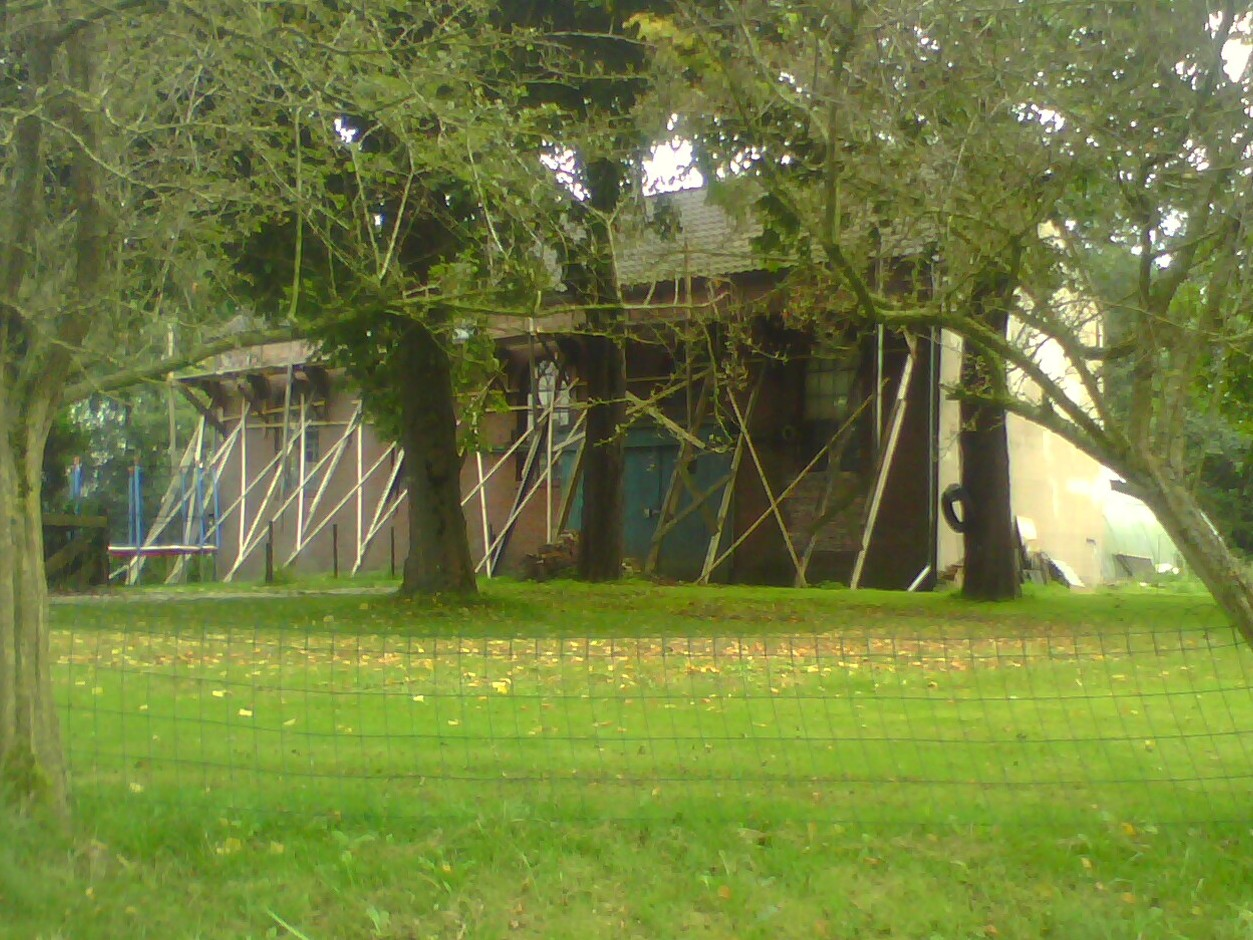
Former vermaning in Den Horn

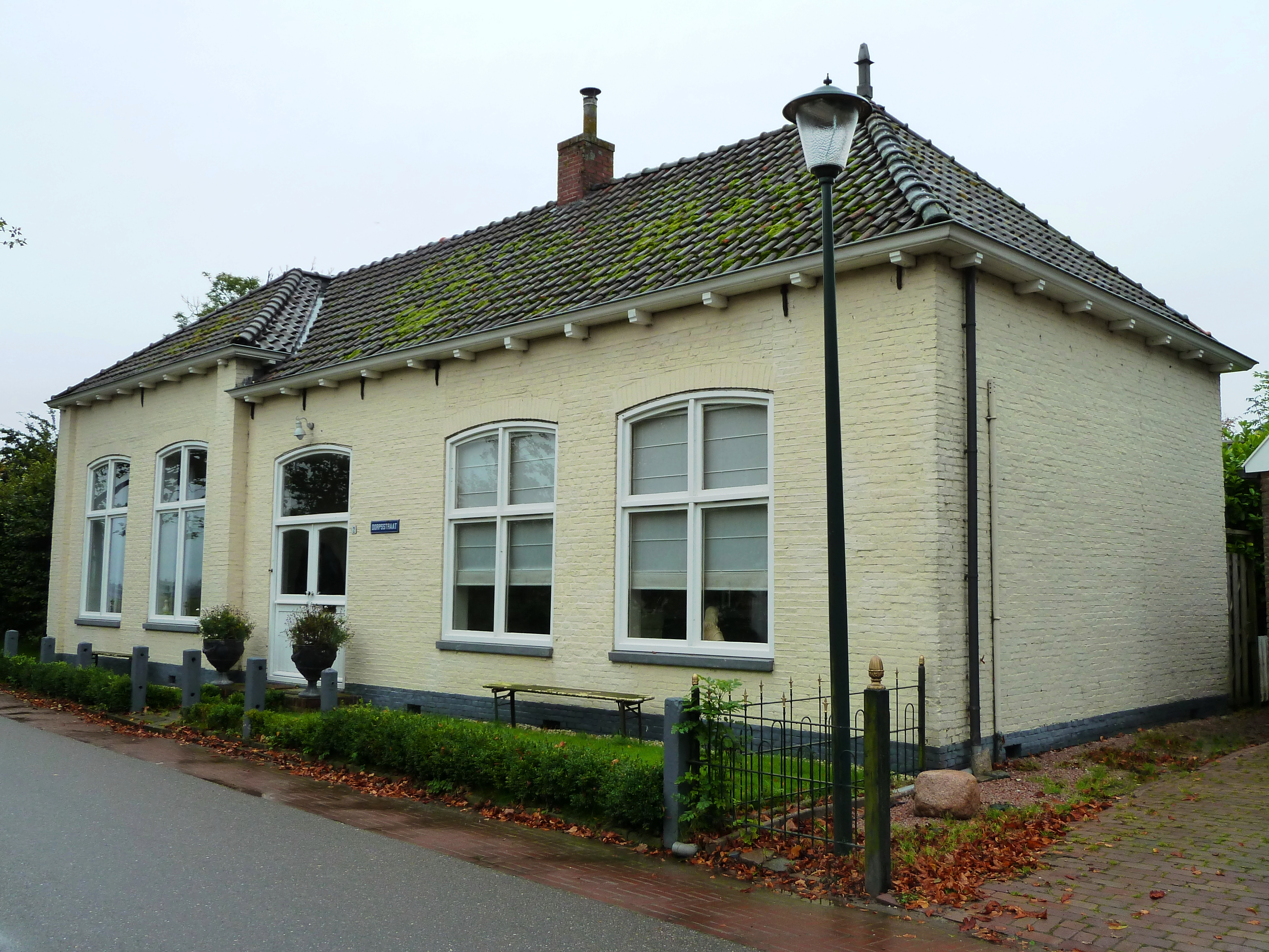
Former school of Den Horn

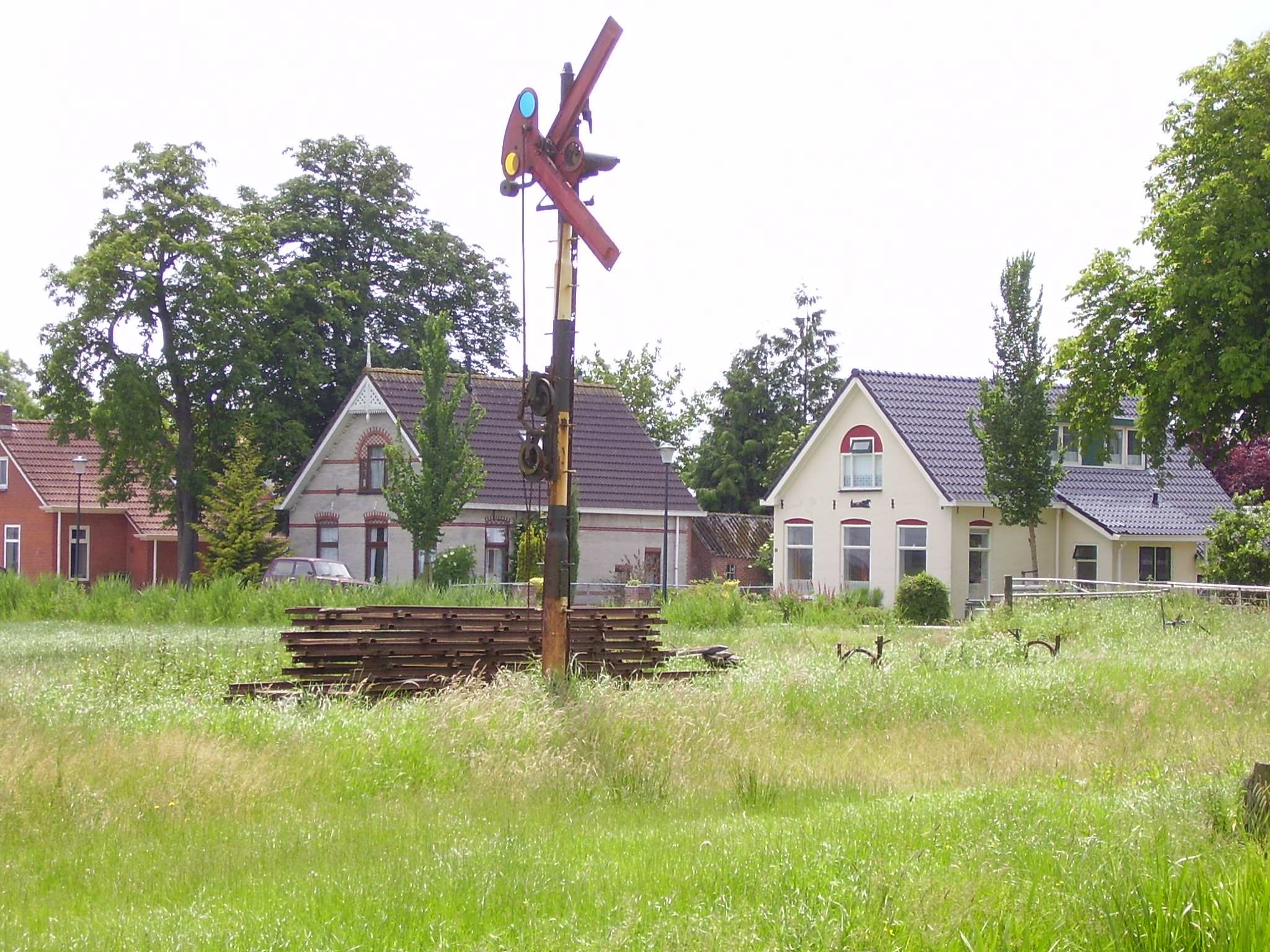
Remnants of former stopping place Den Horn

== Notable people ==
- Melvin Twellaar (born 1996), rower
