= Jack Cleary (rower) =

Australian rower (born 1995)

Personal information
- Born: 8 August 1995 (age 31) Subiaco, Western Australia
- Education: Trinity College, Perth; University of California, Berkeley
- Years active: 2019-current
- Height: 179 cm (5 ft 10 in)
- Weight: 90 kg (198 lb)

Sport
- Sport: Rowing
- Club: West Australian Rowing Club

Achievements and titles
- National finals: King's Cup 2014, 2019-21; Australian Champion M4X 2021,22
Medal record
Olympic Games
Bronze medal – third place	2020 Tokyo	Quad scull

Jack Cleary (born 8 August 1995) is an Australian representative rower. He is an Australian national champion, has represented at world championships and is an Olympic medallist. He raced in the Australian men's quad scull at Tokyo 2021 to a bronze medal.

== Club and state rowing ==
Cleary was schooled at Trinity College, Perth where he took up rowing. His senior club rowing started from the West Australian Rowing Club.

Cleary's state representative debut for Western Australia came in 2013 when he was selected in the state youth eight to contest the Noel Wilkinson trophy at the Interstate Regatta. In 2014 he was selected in the West Australian men's senior eight to contest the Kings Cup.

Cleary attended the University of California, Berkeley, double-majoring in Economics and Sociology. He rowed in UC Berkeley fours and eights at Intercollegiate Rowing Association regattas from 2016 to 2018.

Cleary was again selected in West Australian King's Cup eights in 2019 and 2021. In 2021 and 2022 he won Australian Championship titles in the open men's quad scull.

== International representative rowing ==
Cleary made his Australian representative debut at the 2013 Junior World Rowing Championships in Trakai, Lithuania when he was selected to race Australia's double scull which finished in overall sixth place. In 2015 he was selected in the bow seat of Australia's coxed for the World Rowing U23 Championships in Plovdiv; the crew finished fifth in the final.

Cleary took part in the following 2016 World Rowing U23 Championships in Rotterdam, where the team placed third.

By national team selections in 2021 for the delayed Tokyo Olympics, Cleary had joined the Australian quad scull, which qualified for the Olympics on 2019 performances. Cleary was selected to race that boat with Cameron Girdlestone, Luke Letcher and Caleb Antill in the other seats. This combination had won the 2021 Australian national title in the quad. In Tokyo the quad won their heat and progressed straight to the A final. They were behind the lead for much of the race but winds had blown up before the event and some crews struggled with their bladework in the chop. With Cleary sculling and steering from the bow seat, the Australian quad kept their composure and technique and managed a bronze medal finish on the line.

Antill and Cleary were selected as the likely Australian men's double scull to prepare for the 2022 international season and the 2022 World Rowing Championships. Racing with Antill in the double, Cleary won bronze at the World Rowing Cup II in Poznan. A week earlier at the Henley Royal Regatta Cleary and Antill had beaten the British double to win the Double Sculls Challenge Cup. At the 2022 World Rowing Championships at Racize, he raced as Australia's representative single sculler. He qualified through to the B final in which he finished sixth for an overall twelfth placing at the regatta.

In March 2023 Cleary was again selected in Australian men's sculling squad for the 2023 international season. At the Rowing World Cup II in Varese, Italy Cleary raced as Australia's M2X entrant with Harley Moore. They made the A final and finished in fourth place. At 2023's RWC III in Lucerne, Cleary and Moore again raced the M2X. This time they proceeded through the repechage, missed the A final and finished in overall ninth place. For the 2023 World Rowing Championships in Belgrade Serbia, Cleary was elevated to the Australian quad scull racing with Henry Youl, David Bartholot and Caleb Antill. They placed third in their heat and then won their repechage to progress to the A/B semifinals. Ultimately they finished third in the B final for an overall ninth place world ranking. This result did not qualify the boat for the 2024 Paris Olympics.
