= Jonas Gelsen =

German rower (born 2001)

Personal information
- Born: 4 September 2001 (age 24)

Sport
- Country: Germany
- Sport: rower
Medal record
Men's rowing
Representing Germany
World Championships
Silver medal – second place	2026 Amsterdam	Quadruple sculls
European Championships
Gold medal – first place	2026 Varese	Quadruple sculls
Bronze medal – third place	2024 Szeged	Double sculls
World U23 Championships
Gold medal – first place	2022 Varese	Single sculls

Jonas Gelsen (born 4 September 2001) is a German rower who finished third in the double sculls at the 2024 European Championships.

== Sporting career ==
Jonas Gelsen rows for the Nassovia Höchst 1881 Rowing Club. At the German Championships in 2022 and 2023, he was second in the single sculls behind Oliver Zeidler.

At the 2021 U23 World Championships, Gelsen finished fourth in the single sculls. The following year, he won the 2022 U23 World Championships. In 2023, Gelsen formed a double sculls with Marc Weber, who competes for Marburg. The two finished ninth at the 2023 European Championships in Bled. Three and a half months later, the two finished eighth at the World Championships in Belgrade, thus achieving direct qualification for a German double sculls at the 2024 Olympic Games.

In 2024, Gelsen and Weber rowed to third place at the 2024 European Rowing Championships in Szeged, less than half a second behind the second-placed Spaniards, but ten seconds ahead of the fourth-placed Italians. At the 2024 Olympic Games in Paris, Gelsen and Weber finished ninth.
