= Henry Youl =

Australian rower (born 1995)

Personal information
- Nationality: Australian
- Born: 12 October 1995 (age 30)

Sport
- Country: Australia
- Sport: Rowing
- Club: Tamar Rowing Club; Sydney University Boat Club
Medal record
Men's rowing
Representing Australia
World Championships
Bronze medal – third place	2022 Račice	Eight

Henry Youl (born 12 October 1995) is an Australian representative rower. He has represented at underage and senior World Championships and won a bronze medal at the 2022 World Championships.

== Club and state rowing ==
Youl was raised in Tasmania. His Australian senior club rowing has been from the Tamar Rowing Club in Launceston and then following his selection to national squads, from the Sydney University Boat Club.

== International representative rowing ==
Youl made his Australian representative debut as stroke of the coxless four at the 2016 U23 World Rowing Championships in Rotterdam. He led that crew to a bronze medal win. The following year Youl again stroked the Australian U23 coxless four at the U23 World Championships in Plovdiv. They finished overall fifth.

Youl was selected in the Australian team for the 2022 international season and the 2022 World Rowing Championships. He rowed in the Australian men's eight to silver medal placings at both of the World Rowing Cups in 2022. At the 2022 World Rowing Championships at Racize, Youl rowed in the three seat of the eight. The eight won through their repechage to make the A final where they raced to a third place and a World Championship bronze medal.

In March 2023 Youl was selected in the Australian men's sculling squad for the 2023 international season. At the Rowing World Cup II in Varese, Italy Youl raced as Australia's M1X entrant and finished in overall 26th place. Australia's quad scull at the RWC II made the A final and Youll replaced an injured David Bartholot in that race, with the crew finishing in sixth place. At the 2023 World Rowing Championships in Belgrade Serbia, Youl, Bartholot, Antill and Jack Cleary were selected to race Australia's quad scull. They placed third in their heat and then won their repechage to progress to the A/B semifinals. Ultimately they finished third in the B final for an overall ninth place world ranking. This result did not qualify the boat for the 2024 Paris Olympics.
