= Stef Broenink =

Dutch rower (born 1990)

Personal information
- Full name: Stefan Broenink
- Nationality: Dutch
- Born: 19 September 1990 (age 35) Gouda, Netherlands
- Height: 1.95 m (6 ft 5 in)

Sport
- Country: Netherlands
- Sport: Rowing
- Club: K.S.R.V. Njord
Medal record
Men's rowing
Representing Netherlands
Olympic Games
Silver medal – second place	2020 Tokyo	Double sculls
Silver medal – second place	2024 paris	Double sculls
World Championships
Gold medal – first place	2023 Belgrade	Double sculls
European Championships
Gold medal – first place	2020 Poznań	Double sculls
Silver medal – second place	2019 Lucerne	Single sculls
Silver medal – second place	2021 Varese	Double sculls
Bronze medal – third place	2023 Bled	Double sculls
Universiade
Bronze medal – third place	2013 Kazan	Eight

Stefan Broenink (born 19 September 1990) is a Dutch rower. He is a 2023 world champion, an Olympian and an Olympic silver medallist. He won the silver medal at the 2020 Summer Olympics in the double sculls event together with Melvin Twellaar. He was still rowing the double scull with Twellaar when they won gold in that boat at the 2023 World Rowing Championships.
