= Daire Lynch =

Irish rower (born 1998)

Personal information
- Nationality: Irish
- Born: 19 June 1998 (age 28); Clonmel, Ireland

Sport
- Country: Ireland
- Sport: Rowing
- Event: Double sculls
- Club: UCD Boat Club
Medal record
Men's rowing
Representing Ireland
Olympic Games
Bronze medal – third place	2024 Paris	Double sculls
World Championships
Bronze medal – third place	2023 Belgrade	Double sculls

Daire Lynch (/ˈdɑːrə/ born 19 June 1998) is an Irish rower. Competing With Philip Doyle in the double sculls, he won a bronze medal at the 2023 World Rowing Championships, and the 2024 Olympics.

== Career ==
From Clonmel, in County Tipperary, he attended Yale University between 2017 and 2022, studying economics. He won the Irish National Championship single sculls in 2021.

In September 2023, he won a bronze medal in the Heavyweight Double Sculls final at the World Rowing Championships in Belgrade. He won bronze alongside Phillip Doyle at the Rowing World Cup at Lago di Varese in Italy in April 2024.

In June 2024, he won gold in the men's double sculls in the third World Cup regatta in Poznań alongside Phillip Doyle.

He qualified alongside Doyle for the double sculls at the 2024 Paris Olympics. On 1 August he won a bronze medal alongside Phillip Doyle in the Men's double sculls final.

He teamed up with Ross Corrigan for the men's pair at the 2025 European Rowing Championships in Plovdiv.
