= Gavin Stone (rower) =

Canadian rower (born 1997)

Personal information
- Born: May 21, 1997 (age 29) Brampton, Ontario, Canada
- Height: 192 cm (6 ft 4 in)
- Weight: 98 kg (216 lb)

Sport
- Country: Canada
- Sport: Rowing

Gavin Stone (born May 21, 1997) is a Canadian rower.

== Career ==
He began competitive rowing with the Island Lake Rowing Club.

In May 2021, Stone competed in the men's fours event at the Final Olympic qualification tournament, finishing in second place and qualifying for the 2020 Summer Olympics. In June 2021, Stone was named to Canada's 2020 Olympic team.
