= Franck N'Dri =

Ivorian rower

Personal information
- Full name: Franck Aimé N’Dri Kouadio
- Nationality: Ivory Coast
- Born: 9 January 1997 (age 28)

Sport
- Sport: Rowing

Franck N'Dri (born 9 January 1997) is an Ivorian rower. He competed in the 2020 Summer Olympics.
