= Harley Moore =

Australian rower (born 1995)

Personal information
- Nationality: Australian
- Born: 24 February 1995 (age 31)

Sport
- Country: Australia
- Sport: Rowing
- Club: Commercial Rowing Club
Medal record
Men's rowing
Representing Australia

Harley Moore (born 24 February 1995) is an Australian representative sweep-oar rower. He was a 2017 U23 World Champion and has represented at senior World Championships.

== Club and state rowing ==
Moore attended St Joseph's College, Nudgee where he took up rowing. His senior club rowing has been from the Commercial Rowing Club in Brisbane.

Moore first made state selection for Queensland in the 2022 men's senior eight which contested the King's Cup at the Interstate Regatta within the Australian Rowing Championships.

== International representative rowing ==
Moore debuted for Australia at the 2013 Junior World Championships in Trakai, racing a coxless pair which finished in thirteenth place. He next rowed in Australian colours at the 2017 World Rowing U23 Championships in a coxless four which won the U23 World Championship title in that boat class.

Moore was selected in the Australian senior training team to prepare for the 2022 international season and the 2022 World Rowing Championships. He rowed Australia's coxless pair with Alex Hill at World Rowing Cup III July 2022 to a silver medal. At the 2022 World Rowing Championships at Racize, he raced in the Australian coxless pair with Hill. They finished fifth overall.

In March 2023 Moore was selected in Australian men's sculling squad for the 2023 international season. At the Rowing World Cup II in Varese, Italy Moore raced as Australia's M2X entrant with Jack Cleary. They made the A final and finished in fourth place. At 2023's RWC III in Lucerne, Moore and Cleary again raced the M2X. This time they proceeded through the repechage, missed the A final and finished in overall ninth place. For the 2023 World Rowing Championships in Belgrade Serbia, Moore was again selected to race Australia's double scull but now partnered with Cormac Kennedy-Leverett. They placed 5th in their heat but rowed to 2nd place in the repechage to proceed through to the quarter-finals. Ultimately they finished 3rd in D final for an overall 21st place world ranking from the regatta.
