= Martin Mačković =

Serbian rower (born 1995)

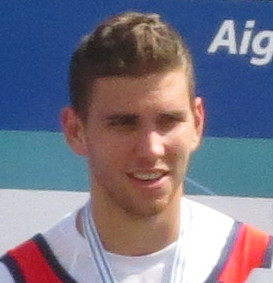
- Mačković in 2015

Personal information
- Nationality: Serbian
- Born: 4 September 1995 (age 31) Subotica, Serbia, FR Yugoslavia
- Education: University of California, Berkeley
- Height: 1.95 m (6 ft 5 in)
- Weight: 90 kg (198 lb)

Sport
- Sport: Rowing
- Events: Coxless pair, Double scull
- Club: Veslacki Klub Partizan

Achievements and titles
- Olympic finals: Tokyo 2020 M2-
Medal record
Men's rowing
Representing Serbia
World Championships
Silver medal – second place	2025 Shanghai	M2x
Silver medal – second place	2026 Amsterdam	M2x
Bronze medal – third place	2015 Aiguebelette	M2+
European Championships
Gold medal – first place	2026 Varese	M2x
Bronze medal – third place	2021 Varese	M2x
Mediterranean Games
Gold medal – first place	2026 Taranto	Double sculls

Martin Mačković (Serbian Cyrillic: Мартин Мачковић; born 4 September 1995) is a Serbian rower. He competed at the 2020 Summer Olympics in the men's coxless pair together with Miloš Vasić and placed fifth.
