= Philip Doyle (rower) =

Irish rower (born 1992)

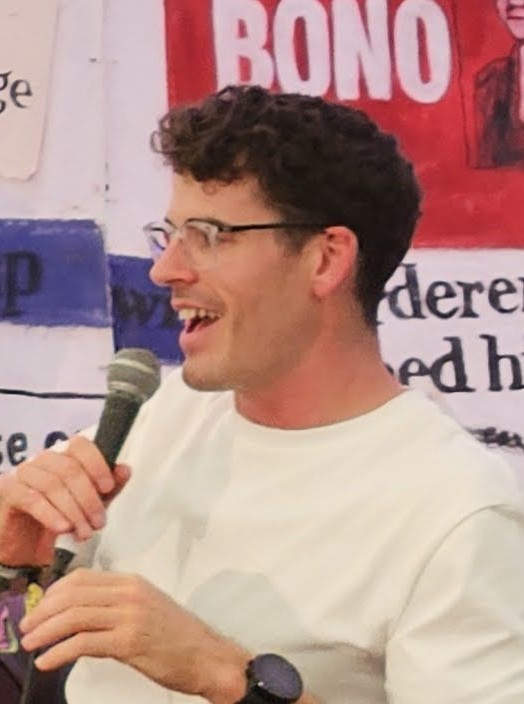
- Doyle in 2024

Personal information
- Nationality: Irish
- Born: 17 September 1992 (age 34) Lisburn, Northern Ireland
- Height: 197 cm (6 ft 6 in)

Sport
- Country: Ireland
- Sport: Rowing
- Event: Double sculls
- Club: Belfast Boat Club
Medal record
Men's rowing
Representing Ireland
Olympic Games
Bronze medal – third place	2024 Paris	Double sculls
World Championships
Silver medal – second place	2019 Ottensheim	Double sculls
Bronze medal – third place	2023 Belgrade	Double sculls
Bronze medal – third place	2025 Shanghai	Double sculls

Philip Doyle (born 17 September 1992) is an Irish rower. He is an Olympian and won a medal at the 2019 World Rowing Championships. He raced in the men's double sculls with Ronan Byrne at Tokyo 2020. He won a bronze medal in the men's double sculls at the 2024 Summer Olympics with Daire Lynch.

== Early life and hockey ==
Doyle went to St. Mary's Primary School in Banbridge from 1996 to 2004. He then attended Banbridge Academy 2004-2011 where he played hockey winning the Bannister Bowl 2006, Richardson Cup 2007 & 2008, the McCullough Cup 2010 and Burney Cup 2010 & 2011. He played in a side which won the All Ireland Schools Cup 2011 and made the semi-finals of the European Schools Cup in 2011.

Doyle played for Ulster U16 at centre back when they were runners-up in an inter-provincial tournament. He represented Ireland U16 in the European championships coming 6th in Holland. Philip also played for Banbridge club up to first XI standard playing centre forward for the 2010/11 season.

== Rowing career ==
Doyle went on to study medicine at Queen's University Belfast in 2012 and took up rowing in 2013. He won the British University Championships as a novice in 2014 and placed second in the Novice Irish National Championships that year All in men's 8+’s. He went to the European Universities Championships in 2014 in Hanover coming 8th in the men's single scull.

In 2016 Doyle won the men's championship double scull With Tiernan Oliver and took silver in the championship single to Sam Twine of Reading University. That year Byrne and Tiernan went on to win a bronze medal in Zagreb in the European Universities and came 9th at the World Universities in Poznan, Poland.

Philip did an intercalated degree in medical sciences in 2015/16 also graduating with a first class honours BSc.

Philip got his senior debut for Ireland rowing in Lucerne, Switzerland in the men's singles coming 15th. He and his partner Ronan Byrne went on to come 9th in Plovdiv, Bulgaria in the men's double September 2018 delaying stating his job as a doctor in Belfast City Hospital after graduating from Queen's University in July 2018.

Philip worked as a foundation 1 doctor in Belfast City Hospital December 2018 – April 2019 before returning to rowing full time and competing at the European Championships in Lucerne, Switzerland with partner Ronan Byrne coming 9th. They went on to win a silver at World Cup II Rotterdam, Netherlands coming second to the Swiss Double. They went on to claim a silver medal at Linz, Austria second to the Chinese double in a time of 6.06.25.

On 1 August 2024, he won a bronze medal alongside Daire Lynch in the Men's double sculls final at the 2024 Summer Olympics.
