= Ben Davison =

American rower

Personal information
- Nationality: British; American
- Born: November 29, 1996 (age 29) Durham, England

Sport
- Sport: Rowing

Ben Davison (born November 29, 1996) is a rower. He competed for the United States at the 2020 and 2024 Olympic Games.

== Early life ==
Davison was born in Durham, England to father Terry and mother Sarah and grew up there until age 10. He spent his teen years in Florida for a change of scenery and attended Citrus High School, where his father worked as a rowing coach. Davison studied Economics at the University of Washington. He has a brother Joe.

== Career ==
He competed in the men's eight event at the 2020 Summer Olympics.

He teamed up in a double scull with Sorin Koszyk in March 2023. He qualified for the men's double sculls at the 2024 Paris Olympics alongside Sorin Koszyk, placing 4th.
