= Aleix García (rower) =

Spanish rower (born 2000)

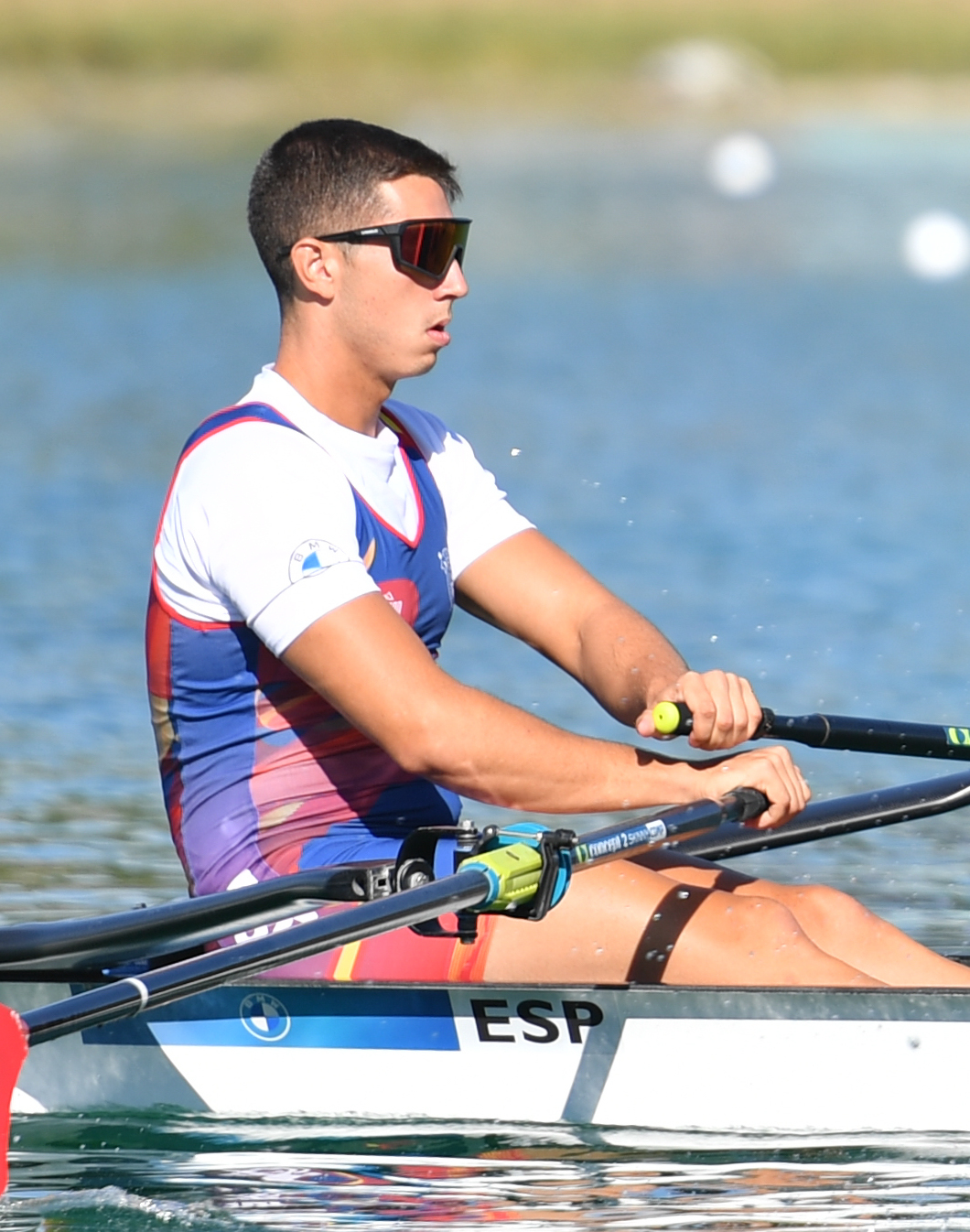
- García at the 2022 European Championships

Medal record

Men's rowing

Representing Spain

World Championships
| Silver medal – second place | 2022 Račice | Double sculls |

European Championships
| Silver medal – second place | 2022 Oberschleißheim | Double sculls |
| Silver medal – second place | 2024 Szeged | Double sculls |

Aleix Garcia i Pujolar (Note: In this Catalan name, the first or paternal surname is García and the second or maternal family name is Pujolar; both are generally joined by the conjunction "i".) (born 10 June 2000 in Girona, Catalonia) is a Spanish rower. He won the silver medal in the double sculls at the 2022 European Rowing Championships.
