= Marc Weber (rower, born 1997) =

German rower

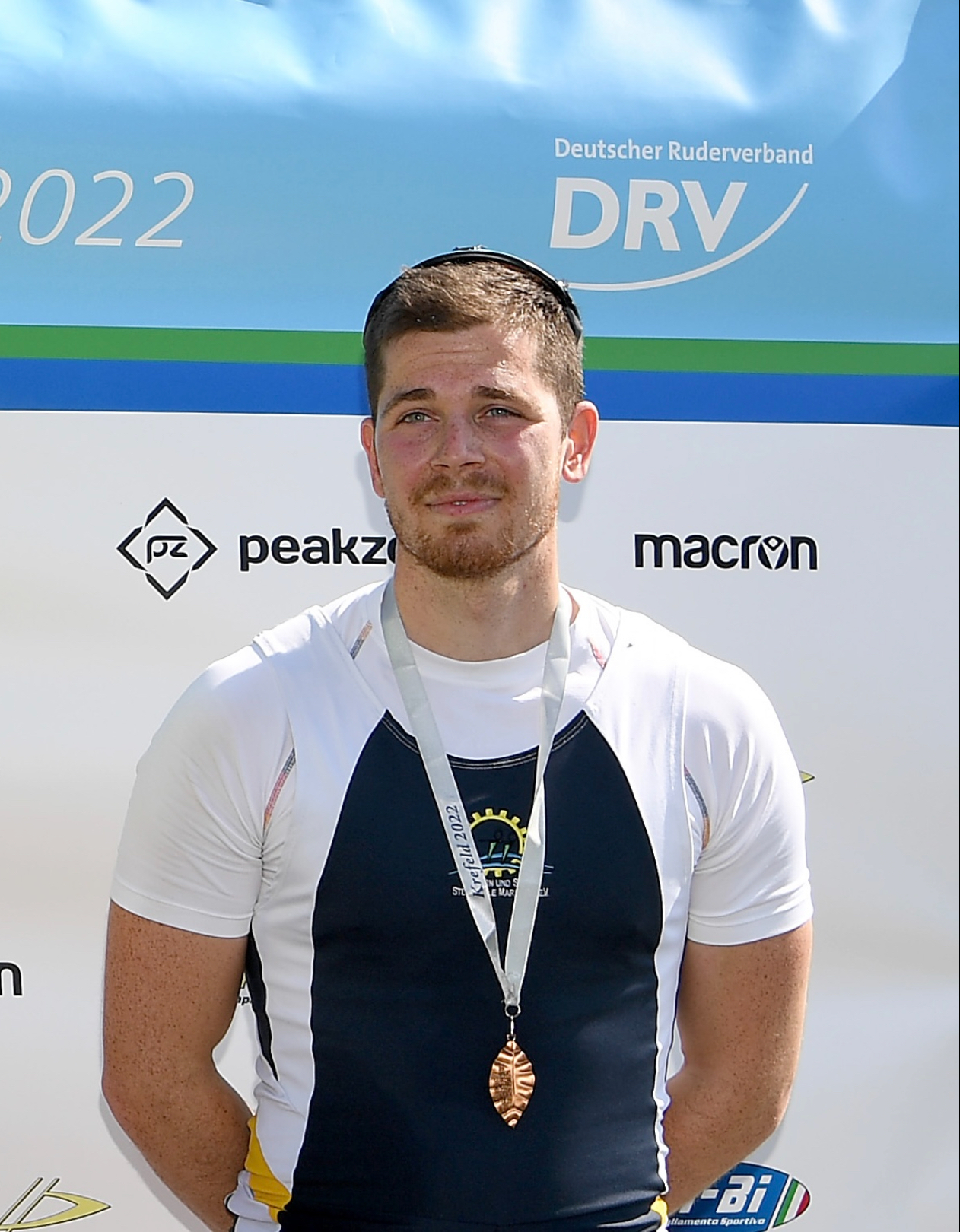

Personal information
- Nationality: Germany
- Born: 5 September 1997 (age 28) Lich, Germany
- Height: 1.91 m (6 ft 3 in)

Sport
- Sport: Rowing
Medal record
Men's rowing
Representing Germany
World Championships
Silver medal – second place	2026 Amsterdam	Quadruple sculls
World U23 Championships
Gold medal – first place	2019 Sarasota	Single sculls
Silver medal – second place	2018 Poznań	Single sculls
World Junior Championships
Silver medal – second place	2015 Rio de Janeiro	Quadruple sculls
European Championships
Gold medal – first place	2026 Varese	Quadruple sculls
Bronze medal – third place	2024 Szeged	Double sculls

Marc Weber (born 5 September 1997) is a German rower. He competed in the 2020 Summer Olympics and the 2024 Summer Olympics.
