= Sorin Koszyk =

American rower (born 1997)

Personal information
- Nationality: American
- Born: November 27, 1997 (age 28)

Sport
- Sport: Rowing
- Event: Double sculls
- College team: Cornell University
- Club: California Rowing Club

Sorin Koszyk (/ˈsɔːrɪn ˈkoʊzɪk/ SOR-in KOH-zik; born November 27, 1997) is an American rower. He competed in the double sculls at the 2024 Summer Olympics.

== Early life ==
He attended Grosse Pointe South High School in Grosse Pointe Farms, Michigan and Cornell University. He started rowing in 2013 and was a successful junior rower, winning six Club National Championships with Detroit Boat Club, and three Midwest Championship titles. At Cornell, he was a two-time Intercollegiate Rowing Association National Champion, two-time IRA Crew of the Year member, First Team All-Ivy, and Ivy League champion prior to his graduation in 2020.

== Career ==
He trained with Penn AC Rowing Association in Philadelphia, where he was part of a quad. However, after narrowly missing out on qualification at the Final Olympic Qualification Regatta, for the delayed 2020 Olympic Games in 2021, he made the decision to move on. In 2022, he started training with the California Rowing Club in Oakland, California.

He teamed up in a double scull with Ben Davison in March 2023. He qualified for the men's double sculls at the Final Olympic and Paralympic Qualification Regatta for the 2024 Paris Olympics alongside Davison, finishing fourth.
