= Jan Cincibuch =

Czech rower

Personal information
- Born: 6 June 1998 (age 28) Prague
- Height: 186 cm (6 ft 1 in)
- Weight: 72 kg (159 lb)

Sport
- Sport: Rowing

Jan Cincibuch (born 6 June 1998) is a Czech rower.

He won a silver medal at the 2018 European Championships. He won the lightweight scull at the 2019 European Rowing U23 Championships. He also won the JM4x at the 2016 World Rowing Junior Championships.
