= Jakub Podrazil =

Czech rower

Personal information
- Born: 9 January 1992 (age 34) Prague, Czech Republic
- Height: 199 cm (6 ft 6 in) (2016)
- Weight: 100 kg (220 lb) (2016)

Sport
- Sport: Rowing

Achievements and titles
- Olympic finals: 2012, 2016
Medal record
Men's rowing
Representing the Czech Republic
European Rowing Championships
Bronze medal – third place	2012 Varese	M8+

Jakub Podrazil (born 9 January 1992) is a Czech rower. He competed in the men's double sculls at the 2020 Olympics with Jan Cincibuch, men's coxless pair event at the 2016 Summer Olympics with Lukas Helesic, and the men's four at the 2012 Summer Olympics.

In 2012, he was also part of the Czech men's eight who won bronze at the European Rowing Championships.

He has also won bronze at the World Indoor Rowing Championships (2023) and a gold at the 2020 European Indoor Rowing Championships.
