= Rodrigo Conde =

Spanish rower (born 1997)

Medal record

Men's rowing

Representing Spain

World Championships
Silver medal – second place	2022 Račice	Double sculls

European Championships
Silver medal – second place	2022 Oberschleißheim	Double sculls
Silver medal – second place	2024 Szeged	Double sculls

Rodrigo Conde Romero (born 3 September 1997, in Moaña) is a Spanish rower. He won the silver medal in the double sculls at the 2022 European Rowing Championships.
