= Andrei Cornea =

Romanian rower (born 1999)

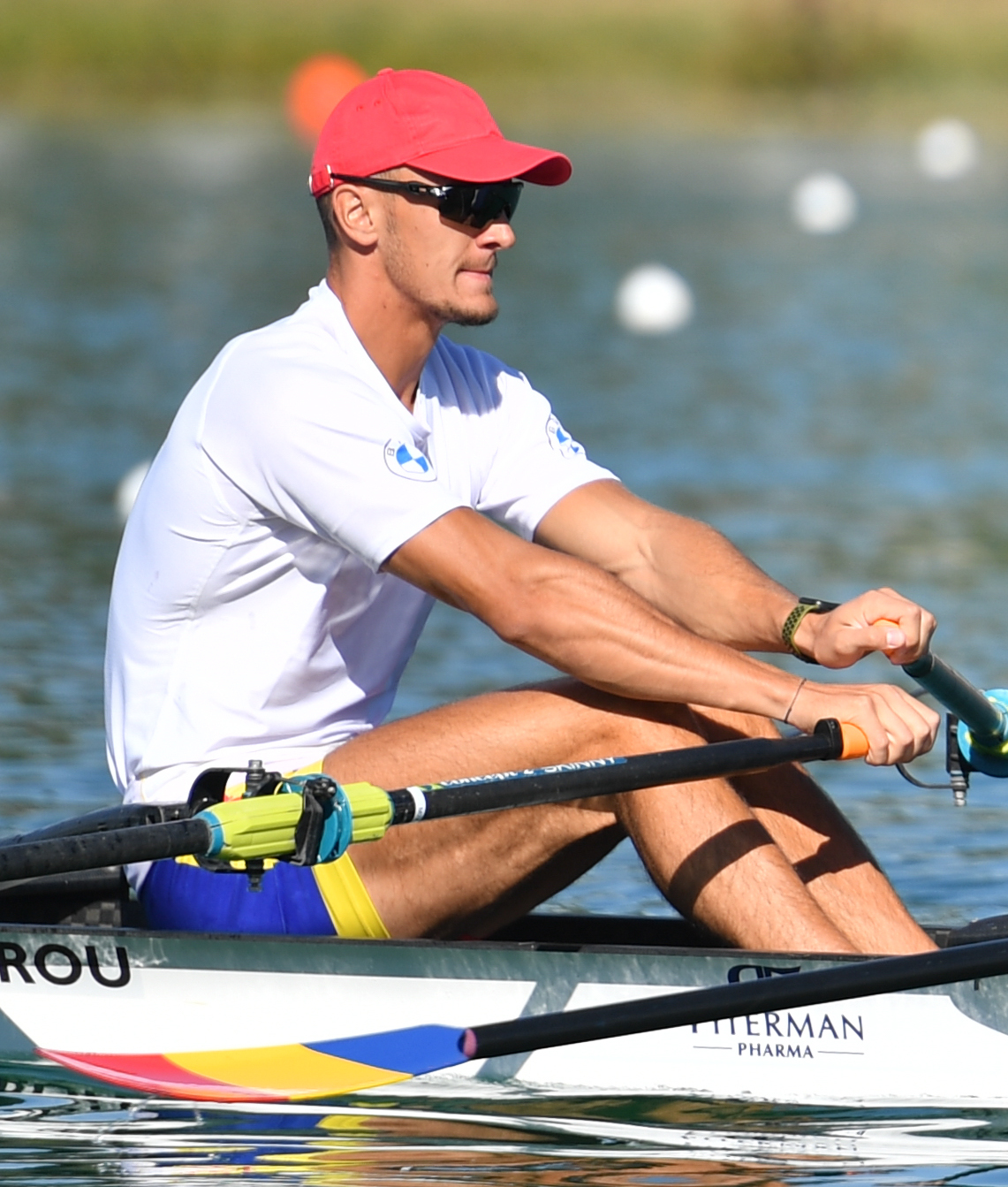
- Cornea in 2022

Personal information
- Full name: Andrei Sebastian Cornea
- Nationality: Romania
- Born: 10 November 1999 (age 26) Vatra Dornei, Romania

Sport
- Sport: Rowing
Medal record
Men's rowing
Representing Romania
Olympic Games
Gold medal – first place	2024 Paris	Double sculls
European Championships
Gold medal – first place	2024 Szeged	Double sculls

Andrei Sebastian Cornea (born 10 November 1999) is a Romanian rower. He won the gold medal at the 2024 Summer Olympics in the double sculls event with Marian Enache and is also a European champion.

== Biography ==
Andrei Cornea was born in Vatra Dornei and spent his youth in Broșteni, Suceava County, Romania. He started rowing at the age of 15 at the "Nicu Gane" Sport Club in Fălticeni. In 2022, he received the title of Honorary Citizen of Broșteni.
