= 2019 World Rowing Championships – Men's double sculls =

Men's double sculls at the 2019 World Rowing Championships
- Venue: Linz-Ottensheim
- Location: Ottensheim, Austria
- Dates: 25 August – 1 September
- Competitors: 62 from 31 nations
- Winning time: 6:05.68

Medalists
gold medal	Liu Zhiyu; Zhang Liang	China
silver medal	Philip Doyle; Ronan Byrne	Ireland
bronze medal	Mirosław Ziętarski; Mateusz Biskup	Poland

The men's double sculls competition at the 2019 World Rowing Championships took place at the Linz-Ottensheim regatta venue. A top-eleven finish ensured qualification for the Tokyo Olympics.

== Schedule ==
The schedule was as follows:

Date	Time	Round
Sunday 25 August 2019	15:47	Heats
Monday 26 August 2019	14:51	Repechages
Wednesday 28 August 2019	12:29	Quarterfinals
Thursday 29 August 2019	15:30	Semifinals E/F
Thursday 29 August 2019	16:00	Semifinals C/D
Friday 30 August 2019	11:40	Semifinals A/B
Saturday 31 August 2019	09:43	Final D
Sunday 1 September 2019	10:15	Final F
Sunday 1 September 2019	10:20	Final E
Sunday 1 September 2019	10:51	Final C
Sunday 1 September 2019	11:42	Final B
Sunday 1 September 2019	13:56	Final A

All times are Central European Summer Time (UTC+2)

== Results ==
=== Heats ===
The three fastest boats in each heat advanced directly to the quarterfinals. The remaining boats were sent to the repechages.

==== Heat 1 ====
Rank	Rowers	Country	Time	Notes
1	Philip Doyle; Ronan Byrne	Ireland	6:28.93	Q
2	David Bartholot; Caleb Antill	Australia	6:32.21	Q
3	Stanislau Shcharbachenia; Dzianis Mihal	Belarus	6:35.36	Q
4	Erik Fred; Justin Keen	United States	6:35.45	R
5	Ivan Futryk; Mykola Kalashnyk	Ukraine	6:53.69	R
6	Erling Øyasæter; Petter Tufte	Norway	6:58.19	R

==== Heat 2 ====
Rank	Rowers	Country	Time	Notes
1	Mirosław Ziętarski; Mateusz Biskup	Poland	6:27.09	Q
2	John Storey; Chris Harris	New Zealand	6:31.47	Q
3	Rodrigo Murillo; Cristian Rosso	Argentina	6:37.88	Q
4	Boris Guerra; Adrián Oquendo	Cuba	6:41.01	R
5	Jüri-Mikk Udam; Sten-Erik Anderson	Estonia	6:53.01	R

==== Heat 3 ====
Rank	Rowers	Country	Time	Notes
1	Dovydas Nemeravičius; Saulius Ritter	Lithuania	6:29.05	Q
2	Tim Ole Naske; Stephan Krüger	Germany	6:35.55	Q
3	Matthew Buie; Trevor Jones	Canada	6:38.51	Q
4	Óscar Vásquez; Francisco Lapostol	Chile	6:41.76	R
5	Stephen Cox; Peter Purcell-Gilpin	Zimbabwe	6:52.29	R

==== Heat 4 ====
Rank	Rowers	Country	Time	Notes
1	Amos Keijser; Nicolas van Sprang	Netherlands	6:26.40	Q
2	Ioan Prundeanu; Marian Enache	Romania	6:31.89	Q
3	Keita Yamao; Ryuta Arakawa	Japan	6:39.70	Q
4	Boris Yotov; Rangel Katsarski	Bulgaria	7:44.48	R
5	Khamis Al-Shamsi; Hamad Al-Matrooshi	United Arab Emirates	7:50.50	R

==== Heat 5 ====
Rank	Rowers	Country	Time	Notes
1	John Collins; Graeme Thomas	Great Britain	6:28.53	Q
2	Hugo Boucheron; Matthieu Androdias	France	6:30.54	Q
3	Fabio Infimo; Simone Venier	Italy	6:33.08	Q
4	Nik Krebs; Miha Aljančič	Slovenia	6:33.43	R
5	Anastas Shashkov; Mikhail Taskin	Kazakhstan	7:06.95	R

==== Heat 6 ====
Rank	Rowers	Country	Time	Notes
1	Liu Zhiyu; Zhang Liang	China	6:31.11	Q
2	Barnabé Delarze; Roman Röösli	Switzerland	6:35.10	Q
3	Mzwandile Sotsaka; Bradley Betts	South Africa	6:43.70	Q
4	Nikita Eskin; Aleksandr Matveev	Russia	6:51.66	R
5	Sawarn Singh; Sukhmeet Singh	India	6:54.35	R

=== Repechages ===
The two fastest boats in each repechage advanced to the quarterfinals. The remaining boats were sent to the E/F semifinals.

==== Repechage 1 ====
Rank	Rowers	Country	Time	Notes
1	Nik Krebs; Miha Aljančič	Slovenia	6:45.81	Q
2	Boris Guerra; Adrián Oquendo	Cuba	6:46.60	Q
3	Erling Øyasæter; Petter Tufte	Norway	6:50.07	SE/F
4	Sawarn Singh; Sukhmeet Singh	India	6:54.14	SE/F
5	Stephen Cox; Peter Purcell-Gilpin	Zimbabwe	6:54.43	SE/F

==== Repechage 2 ====
Rank	Rowers	Country	Time	Notes
1	Erik Fred; Justin Keen	United States	6:44.56	Q
2	Juri-Mikk Udam; Sten-Erik Anderson	Estonia	6:46.40	Q
3	Boris Yotov; Rangel Katsarski	Bulgaria	6:49.94	SE/F
4	Anastas Shashkov; Mikhail Taskin	Kazakhstan	7:08.49	SE/F

==== Repechage 3 ====
Rank	Rowers	Country	Time	Notes
1	Óscar Vásquez; Francisco Lapostol	Chile	6:46.08	Q
2	Ivan Futryk; Mykola Kalashnyk	Ukraine	6:48.00	Q
3	Nikita Eskin; Aleksandr Matveev	Russia	6:52.06	SE/F
4	Khamis Al-Shamsi; Hamad Al-Matrooshi	United Arab Emirates	7:47.40	SE/F

=== Quarterfinals ===
The three fastest boats in each quarter advanced to the A/B semifinals. The remaining boats were sent to the C/D semifinals.

==== Quarterfinal 1 ====
Rank	Rowers	Country	Time	Notes
1	Mirosław Ziętarski; Mateusz Biskup	Poland	6:15.06	SA/B
2	Philip Doyle; Ronan Byrne	Ireland	6:17.78	SA/B
3	Tim Ole Naske; Stephan Krüger	Germany	6:21.04	SA/B
4	Ivan Futryk; Mykola Kalashnyk	Ukraine	6:23.36	SC/D
5	Nik Krebs; Miha Aljančič	Slovenia	6:30.60	SC/D
6	Mzwandile Sotsaka; Bradley Betts	South Africa	6:33.03	SC/D

==== Quarterfinal 2 ====
Rank	Rowers	Country	Time	Notes
1	Amos Keijser; Nicolas van Sprang	Netherlands	6:16.66	SA/B
2	Dovydas Nemeravičius; Saulius Ritter	Lithuania	6:18.66	SA/B
3	Hugo Boucheron; Matthieu Androdias	France	6:24.64	SA/B
4	Keita Yamao; Ryuta Arakawa	Japan	6:28.96	SC/D
5	Óscar Vásquez; Francisco Lapostol	Chile	6:33.67	SC/D
6	Juri-Mikk Udam; Sten-Erik Anderson	Estonia	6:44.24	SC/D

==== Quarterfinal 3 ====
Rank	Rowers	Country	Time	Notes
1	John Collins; Graeme Thomas	Great Britain	6:14.21	SA/B
2	Barnabé Delarze; Roman Röösli	Switzerland	6:14.42	SA/B
3	David Bartholot; Caleb Antill	Australia	6:16.26	SA/B
4	Matthew Buie; Trevor Jones	Canada	6:18.68	SC/D
5	Rodrigo Murillo; Cristian Rosso	Argentina	6:23.66	SC/D
6	Erik Fred; Justin Keen	United States	6:41.18	SC/D

==== Quarterfinal 4 ====
Rank	Rowers	Country	Time	Notes
1	Liu Zhiyu; Zhang Liang	China	6:12.42	SA/B
2	John Storey; Chris Harris	New Zealand	6:14.04	SA/B
3	Ioan Prundeanu; Marian Enache	Romania	6:15.76	SA/B
4	Stanislau Shcharbachenia; Dzianis Mihal	Belarus	6:24.24	SC/D
5	Boris Guerra; Adrián Oquendo	Cuba	6:28.64	SC/D
6	Fabio Infimo; Simone Venier	Italy	6:31.05	SC/D

=== Semifinals E/F ===
All but the slowest boat in each semi were sent to the E final. The slowest boats were sent to the F final.

==== Semifinal 1 ====
Rank	Rowers	Country	Time	Notes
1	Nikita Eskin; Aleksandr Matveev	Russia	6:25.61	FE
2	Erling Øyasæter; Petter Tufte	Norway	6:33.12	FE
3	Anastas Shashkov; Mikhail Taskin	Kazakhstan	6:42.46	FF

==== Semifinal 2 ====
Rank	Rowers	Country	Time	Notes
1	Boris Yotov; Rangel Katsarski	Bulgaria	6:25.05	FE
2	Stephen Cox; Peter Purcell-Gilpin	Zimbabwe	6:25.54	FE
3	Sawarn Singh; Sukhmeet Singh	India	6:26.99	FE
4	Khamis Al-Shamsi; Hamad Al-Matrooshi	United Arab Emirates	7:20.04	FF

=== Semifinals C/D ===
The three fastest boats in each semi advanced to the C final. The remaining boats were sent to the D final.

==== Semifinal 1 ====
Rank	Rowers	Country	Time	Notes
1	Rodrigo Murillo; Cristian Rosso	Argentina	6:14.05	FC
2	Mzwandile Sotsaka; Bradley Betts	South Africa	6:17.04	FC
3	Ivan Futryk; Mykola Kalashnyk	Ukraine	6:18.01	FC
4	Erik Fred; Justin Keen	United States	6:18.29	FD
5	Keita Yamao; Ryuta Arakawa	Japan	6:26.48	FD
6	Boris Guerra; Adrián Oquendo	Cuba	6:32.64	FD

==== Semifinal 2 ====
Rank	Rowers	Country	Time	Notes
1	Fabio Infimo; Simone Venier	Italy	6:13.24	FC
2	Matthew Buie; Trevor Jones	Canada	6:13.25	FC
3	Stanislau Shcharbachenia; Dzianis Mihal	Belarus	6:16.81	FC
4	Nik Krebs; Miha Aljančič	Slovenia	6:19.23	FD
5	Óscar Vásquez; Francisco Lapostol	Chile	6:24.70	FD
6	Juri-Mikk Udam; Sten-Erik Anderson	Estonia	6:27.98	FD

=== Semifinals A/B ===
The three fastest boats in each semi advanced to the A final. The remaining boats were sent to the B final.

==== Semifinal 1 ====
Rank	Rowers	Country	Time	Notes
1	Liu Zhiyu; Zhang Liang	China	6:12.35	FA
2	Mirosław Ziętarski; Mateusz Biskup	Poland	6:13.86	FA
3	Barnabé Delarze; Roman Röösli	Switzerland	6:15.47	FA
4	David Bartholot; Caleb Antill	Australia	6:17.20	FB
5	Tim Ole Naske; Stephan Krüger	Germany	6:17.87	FB
6	Dovydas Nemeravičius; Saulius Ritter	Lithuania	6:32.50	FB

==== Semifinal 2 ====
Rank	Rowers	Country	Time	Notes
1	Philip Doyle; Ronan Byrne	Ireland	6:13.88	FA
2	Ioan Prundeanu; Marian Enache	Romania	6:14.86	FA
3	John Collins; Graeme Thomas	Great Britain	6:15.84	FA
4	Amos Keijser; Nicolas van Sprang	Netherlands	6:20.27	FB
5	John Storey; Chris Harris	New Zealand	6:23.02	FB
6	Hugo Boucheron; Matthieu Androdias	France	6:33.64	FB

=== Finals ===
The A final determined the rankings for places 1 to 6. Additional rankings were determined in the other finals.

==== Final F ====
Rank	Rowers	Country	Time
1	Anastas Shashkov; Mikhail Taskin	Kazakhstan	6:53.68
2	Khamis Al-Shamsi; Hamad Al-Matrooshi	United Arab Emirates	7:31.25

==== Final E ====
Rank	Rowers	Country	Time
1	Nikita Eskin; Aleksandr Matveev	Russia	6:28.33
2	Erling Øyasæter; Petter Tufte	Norway	6:32.33
3	Sawarn Singh; Sukhmeet Singh	India	6:32.35
4	Stephen Cox; Peter Purcell-Gilpin	Zimbabwe	6:34.04
5	Boris Yotov; Rangel Katsarski	Bulgaria	6:46.27

==== Final D ====
Rank	Rowers	Country	Time
1	Nik Krebs; Miha Aljančič	Slovenia	6:23.87
2	Erik Fred; Justin Keen	United States	6:24.98
3	Keita Yamao; Ryuta Arakawa	Japan	6:27.52
4	Francisco Lapostol; Óscar Vásquez	Chile	6:28.10
5	Juri-Mikk Udam; Sten-Erik Anderson	Estonia	6:28.82
6	Boris Guerra; Adrián Oquendo	Cuba	7:02.15

==== Final C ====
Rank	Rowers	Country	Time
1	Rodrigo Murillo; Cristian Rosso	Argentina	6:21.41
2	Matthew Buie; Trevor Jones	Canada	6:23.64
3	Stanislau Shcharbachenia; Dzianis Mihal	Belarus	6:25.49
4	Ivan Futryk; Mykola Kalashnyk	Ukraine	6:26.81
5	Fabio Infimo; Simone Venier	Italy	6:29.53
6	Mzwandile Sotsaka; Bradley Betts	South Africa	6:29.97

==== Final B ====
Rank	Rowers	Country	Time
1	Amos Keijser; Nicolas van Sprang	Netherlands	6:19.55
2	John Storey; Chris Harris	New Zealand	6:19.57
3	Hugo Boucheron; Matthieu Androdias	France	6:21.50
4	Tim Ole Naske; Stephan Krüger	Germany	6:21.75
5	Dovydas Nemeravičius; Saulius Ritter	Lithuania	6:22.13
6	David Bartholot; Caleb Antill	Australia	6:23.91

==== Final A ====
Rank	Rowers	Country	Time
1st place, gold medalist(s)	Liu Zhiyu; Zhang Liang	China	6:05.68
2nd place, silver medalist(s)	Philip Doyle; Ronan Byrne	Ireland	6:06.25
3rd place, bronze medalist(s)	Mirosław Ziętarski; Mateusz Biskup	Poland	6:07.87
4	John Collins; Graeme Thomas	Great Britain	6:10.35
5	Barnabé Delarze; Roman Röösli	Switzerland	6:11.10
6	Ioan Prundeanu; Marian Enache	Romania	6:12.31
