= 2017 World Rowing Championships – Men's double sculls =

Men's double sculls at the 2017 World Rowing Championships
- Venue: Nathan Benderson Park
- Location: Sarasota, United States
- Dates: 25 September – 1 October
- Competitors: 40 from 20 nations
- Winning time: 6:10.07

Medalists
gold medal	John Storey; Chris Harris	New Zealand
silver medal	Mirosław Ziętarski; Mateusz Biskup	Poland
bronze medal	Filippo Mondelli; Luca Rambaldi	Italy

The men's double sculls competition at the 2017 World Rowing Championships in Sarasota took place in Nathan Benderson Park.

== Schedule ==
The schedule was as follows:

Date	Time	Round
Monday 25 September 2017	11:14	Heats
Wednesday 27 September 2017	11:35	Repechages
Thursday 28 September 2017	09:40	Semifinals C/D
Friday 29 September 2017	10:05	Semifinals A/B
Friday 29 September 2017	13:35	Final D
Friday 29 September 2017	14:15	Final C
Sunday 1 October 2017	09:00	Final B
Sunday 1 October 2017	10:42	Final A

All times are Eastern Daylight Time (UTC-4)

== Results ==
=== Heats ===
The two fastest boats in each heat advanced directly to the A/B semifinals. The remaining boats were sent to the repechages.

==== Heat 1 ====
Rank	Rowers	Country	Time	Notes
1	Barnabé Delarze; Roman Röösli	Switzerland	6:15.80	SA/B
2	Mindaugas Griškonis; Saulius Ritter	Lithuania	6:17.43	SA/B
3	Ioan Prundeanu; Marian-Florian Enache	Romania	6:25.14	R
4	Dzianis Mihal; Pilip Pavukou	Belarus	6:30.28	R
5	Janier Concepción; Adrián Oquendo	Cuba	6:45.01	R

==== Heat 2 ====
Rank	Rowers	Country	Time	Notes
1	Mirosław Ziętarski; Mateusz Biskup	Poland	6:13.54	SA/B
2	Matthieu Androdias; Hugo Boucheron	France	6:14.65	SA/B
3	Kjetil Borch; Olaf Tufte	Norway	6:19.91	R
4	Bram Schwarz; Nicolas van Sprang	Netherlands	6:28.32	R
5	Matthew Buie; Conlin McCabe	Canada	6:32.79	R

==== Heat 3 ====
Rank	Rowers	Country	Time	Notes
1	John Storey; Chris Harris	New Zealand	6:17.89	SA/B
2	Georgi Bozhilov; Kristian Vasilev	Bulgaria	6:22.72	SA/B
3	Ruben Steinhardt; Henrik Runge	Germany	6:25.89	R
4	Sten-Erik Anderson; Jüri-Mikk Udam	Estonia	6:37.82	R
5	Diego Sánchez Sánchez; Juan Florez	Mexico	6:39.56	R

==== Heat 4 ====
Rank	Rowers	Country	Time	Notes
1	Graeme Thomas; Angus Groom	Great Britain	6:14.29	SA/B
2	Filippo Mondelli; Luca Rambaldi	Italy	6:15.61	SA/B
3	John Graves; Benjamin Davison	United States	6:16.81	R
4	Rodrigo Murillo; Cristian Rosso	Argentina	6:25.59	R
5	David Watts; Luke Letcher	Australia	6:37.98	R

=== Repechages ===
The two fastest boats in each repechage advanced to the A/B semifinals. The remaining boats were sent to the C/D semifinals.

==== Repechage 1 ====
Rank	Rowers	Country	Time	Notes
1	Kjetil Borch; Olaf Tufte	Norway	6:22.44	SA/B
2	Ioan Prundeanu; Marian-Florian Enache	Romania	6:24.35	SA/B
3	Rodrigo Murillo; Cristian Rosso	Argentina	6:29.96	SC/D
4	Diego Sánchez Sánchez; Juan Florez	Mexico	6:35.86	SC/D
5	Janier Concepción; Adrián Oquendo	Cuba	6:36.80	SC/D
6	Sten-Erik Anderson; Juri-Mikk Udam	Estonia	6:44.63	SC/D

==== Repechage 2 ====
Rank	Rowers	Country	Time	Notes
1	John Graves; Benjamin Davison	United States	6:18.97	SA/B
2	Bram Schwarz; Nicolas van Sprang	Netherlands	6:19.11	SA/B
3	Matthew Buie; Conlin McCabe	Canada	6:19.49	SC/D
4	Dzianis Mihal; Pilip Pavukou	Belarus	6:24.50	SC/D
5	David Watts; Luke Letcher	Australia	6:26.05	SC/D
6	Ruben Steinhardt; Henrik Runge	Germany	6:28.16	SC/D

=== Semifinals C/D ===
The three fastest boats in each semi were sent to the C final. The remaining boats were sent to the D final.

==== Semifinal 1 ====
Rank	Rowers	Country	Time	Notes
1	Rodrigo Murillo; Cristian Rosso	Argentina	6:25.39	FC
2	Ruben Steinhardt; Henrik Runge	Germany	6:26.61	FC
3	Dzianis Mihal; Pilip Pavukou	Belarus	6:27.54	FC
4	Janier Concepción; Adrián Oquendo	Cuba	6:30.46	FD

==== Semifinal 2 ====
Rank	Rowers	Country	Time	Notes
1	Matthew Buie; Conlin McCabe	Canada	6:26.81	FC
2	David Watts; Luke Letcher	Australia	6:29.38	FC
3	Diego Sánchez Sánchez; Juan Florez	Mexico	6:31.80	FC
4	Sten-Erik Anderson; Juri-Mikk Udam	Estonia	6:37.00	FD

=== Semifinals A/B ===
The three fastest boats in each semi advanced to the A final. The remaining boats were sent to the B final.

==== Semifinal 1 ====
Rank	Rowers	Country	Time	Notes
1	Mirosław Ziętarski; Mateusz Biskup	Poland	6:19.20	FA
2	Kjetil Borch; Olaf Tufte	Norway	6:19.33	FA
3	Filippo Mondelli; Luca Rambaldi	Italy	6:19.70	FA
4	Barnabé Delarze; Roman Röösli	Switzerland	6:20.30	FB
5	Bram Schwarz; Nicolas van Sprang	Netherlands	6:41.15	FB
6	Georgi Bozhilov; Kristian Vasilev	Bulgaria	7:07.26	FB

==== Semifinal 2 ====
Rank	Rowers	Country	Time	Notes
1	Matthieu Androdias; Hugo Boucheron	France	6:15.39	FA
2	John Storey; Chris Harris	New Zealand	6:16.33	FA
3	Mindaugas Griškonis; Saulius Ritter	Lithuania	6:17.04	FA
4	Graeme Thomas; Angus Groom	Great Britain	6:20.21	FB
5	Ioan Prundeanu; Marian-Florian Enache	Romania	6:21.94	FB
6	John Graves; Benjamin Davison	United States	6:32.15	FB

=== Finals ===
The A final determined the rankings for places 1 to 6. Additional rankings were determined in the other finals.

==== Final D ====
Rank	Rowers	Country	Time
1	Janier Concepción; Adrián Oquendo	Cuba	6:28.48
2	Sten-Erik Anderson; Juri-Mikk Udam	Estonia	6:30.39

==== Final C ====
Rank	Rowers	Country	Time
1	Rodrigo Murillo; Cristian Rosso	Argentina	6:13.50
2	Dzianis Mihal; Pilip Pavukou	Belarus	6:14.00
3	Ruben Steinhardt; Henrik Runge	Germany	6:16.52
4	Matthew Buie; Conlin McCabe	Canada	6:17.11
5	David Watts; Luke Letcher	Australia	6:17.93
6	Diego Sánchez Sánchez; Juan Florez	Mexico	6:22.91

==== Final B ====
Rank	Rowers	Country	Time
1	Graeme Thomas; Angus Groom	Great Britain	6:21.04
2	Barnabé Delarze; Roman Röösli	Switzerland	6:21.34
3	John Graves; Benjamin Davison	United States	6:26.37
4	Ioan Prundeanu; Marian-Florian Enache	Romania	6:28.17
5	Georgi Bozhilov; Kristian Vasilev	Bulgaria	6:31.44
6	Bram Schwarz; Nicolas van Sprang	Netherlands	6:31.86

==== Final A ====
Rank	Rowers	Country	Time
1st place, gold medalist(s)	John Storey; Chris Harris	New Zealand	6:10.07
2nd place, silver medalist(s)	Mirosław Ziętarski; Mateusz Biskup	Poland	6:10.66
3rd place, bronze medalist(s)	Filippo Mondelli; Luca Rambaldi	Italy	6:11.33
4	Mindaugas Griškonis; Saulius Ritter	Lithuania	6:12.58
5	Kjetil Borch; Olaf Tufte	Norway	6:15.31
6	Matthieu Androdias; Hugo Boucheron	France	6:16.36
