= 2018 World Rowing Championships – Men's double sculls =

Men's double sculls at the 2018 World Rowing Championships
- Venue: Plovdiv Regatta Venue
- Location: Plovdiv, Bulgaria
- Dates: 9–16 September
- Competitors: 46 from 23 nations
- Winning time: 6:05.16

Medalists
gold medal	Hugo Boucheron; Matthieu Androdias	France
silver medal	Barnabé Delarze; Roman Röösli	Switzerland
bronze medal	John Storey; Chris Harris	New Zealand

The men's double sculls competition at the 2018 World Rowing Championships in Plovdiv took place at the Plovdiv Regatta Venue.

== Schedule ==
The schedule was as follows:

Date	Time	Round
Sunday 9 September 2018	11:45	Heats
Thursday 13 September 2018	08:45	Repechages
Thursday 13 September 2018	16:05	Semifinals C/D
Friday 14 September 2018	09:19	Semifinals A/B
Saturday 15 September 2018	16:13	Final D
Sunday 16 September 2018	09:54	Final C
Sunday 16 September 2018	10:54	Final B
Sunday 16 September 2018	12:33	Final A

All times are Eastern European Summer Time (UTC+3)

== Results ==
=== Heats ===
Heat winners advanced directly to the A/B semifinals. The remaining boats were sent to the repechages.

==== Heat 1 ====
Rank	Rowers	Country	Time	Notes
1	John Storey; Chris Harris	New Zealand	6:02.23	SA/B
2	Philip Doyle; Ronan Byrne	Ireland	6:12.61	R
3	Nik Krebs; Miha Aljančič	Slovenia	6:18.59	R
4	Emanuele Fiume; Romano Battisti	Italy	6:25.70	R
5	Stefanos Ntouskos; Christos Stergiakas	Greece	6:28.63	R
6	Mohamed Eissa; Mohamed El Shahawi	Egypt	6:36.68	R

==== Heat 2 ====
Rank	Rowers	Country	Time	Notes
1	Amos Keijser; Nicolas van Sprang	Netherlands	6:08.18	SA/B
2	Hugo Boucheron; Matthieu Androdias	France	6:08.43	R
3	Tõnu Endrekson; Kaur Kuslap	Estonia	6:13.37	R
4	Mirosław Ziętarski; Mateusz Biskup	Poland	6:21.43	R
5	Vasily Stepanov; Dmitry Khmylnin	Russia	6:29.65	R
6	Prem Nampratueng; Jaruwat Saensuk	Thailand	6:43.38	R

==== Heat 3 ====
Rank	Rowers	Country	Time	Notes
1	Angus Groom; Jack Beaumont	Great Britain	6:10.07	SA/B
2	Erik Solbakken; Jan Helvig	Norway	6:14.67	R
3	John Graves; Benjamin Davison	United States	6:15.99	R
4	Boris Yotov; Kristian Vasilev	Bulgaria	6:17.14	R
5	Ioan Prundeanu; Marian Enache	Romania	6:17.54	R
6	Artem Verestiuk; Heorhii Verteletskyi	Ukraine	6:29.87	R

==== Heat 4 ====
Rank	Rowers	Country	Time	Notes
1	Timo Piontek; Lars Hartig	Germany	6:05.34	SA/B
2	Barnabé Delarze; Roman Röösli	Switzerland	6:05.84	R
3	Cristian Rosso; Agustín Díaz	Argentina	6:25.71	R
4	Luka Radonić; Luka Baričević	Croatia	6:28.06	R
5	Stephen Cox; Peter Purcell-Gilpin	Zimbabwe	6:34.47	R

=== Repechages ===
The two fastest boats in each repechage advanced to the A/B semifinals. The remaining boats were sent to the C/D semifinals.

==== Repechage 1 ====
Rank	Rowers	Country	Time	Notes
1	Barnabé Delarze; Roman Röösli	Switzerland	6:18.06	SA/B
2	Mirosław Ziętarski; Mateusz Biskup	Poland	6:19.29	SA/B
3	John Graves; Benjamin Davison	United States	6:21.80	SC/D
4	Stefanos Ntouskos; Christos Stergiakas	Greece	6:42.64	SC/D

==== Repechage 2 ====
Rank	Rowers	Country	Time	Notes
1	Tõnu Endrekson; Kaur Kuslap	Estonia	6:21.19	SA/B
2	Erik Solbakken; Jan Helvig	Norway	6:22.79	SA/B
3	Artem Verestiuk; Heorhii Verteletskyi	Ukraine	6:24.63	SC/D
4	Emanuele Fiume; Romano Battisti	Italy	6:25.36	SC/D
5	Stephen Cox; Peter Purcell-Gilpin	Zimbabwe	6:42.43	SC/D

==== Repechage 3 ====
Rank	Rowers	Country	Time	Notes
1	Hugo Boucheron; Matthieu Androdias	France	6:17.50	SA/B
2	Ioan Prundeanu; Marian Enache	Romania	6:21.09	SA/B
3	Nik Krebs; Miha Aljančič	Slovenia	6:29.99	SC/D
4	Prem Nampratueng; Jaruwat Saensuk	Thailand	6:47.31	SC/D
5	Luka Radonić; Luka Baričević	Croatia	6:56.72	SC/D

==== Repechage 4 ====
Rank	Rowers	Country	Time	Notes
1	Philip Doyle; Ronan Byrne	Ireland	6:16.96	SA/B
2	Boris Yotov; Kristian Vasilev	Bulgaria	6:20.15	SA/B
3	Cristian Rosso; Agustín Díaz	Argentina	6:26.12	SC/D
4	Vasily Stepanov; Dmitry Khmylnin	Russia	6:35.60	SC/D
5	Mohamed Eissa; Mohamed El Shahawi	Egypt	6:41.22	SC/D

=== Semifinals C/D ===
The three fastest boats in each semi were sent to the C final. The remaining boats were sent to the D final.

==== Semifinal 1 ====
Rank	Rowers	Country	Time	Notes
1	John Graves; Benjamin Davison	United States	6:26.84	FC
2	Nik Krebs; Miha Aljančič	Slovenia	6:29.28	FC
3	Luka Radonić; Luka Baričević	Croatia	6:34.57	FC
4	Vasily Stepanov; Dmitry Khmylnin	Russia	6:45.16	FD
5	Emanuele Fiume; Romano Battisti	Italy	7:00.99	FD

==== Semifinal 2 ====
Rank	Rowers	Country	Time	Notes
1	Stefanos Ntouskos; Christos Stergiakas	Greece	6:28.40	FC
2	Cristian Rosso; Agustín Díaz	Argentina	6:31.05	FC
3	Artem Verestiuk; Heorhii Verteletskyi	Ukraine	6:33.51	FC
4	Stephen Cox; Peter Purcell-Gilpin	Zimbabwe	6:37.56	FD
5	Prem Nampratueng; Jaruwat Saensuk	Thailand	6:44.35	FD
6	Mohamed Eissa; Mohamed El Shahawi	Egypt	6:50.99	FD

=== Semifinals A/B ===
The three fastest boats in each semi advanced to the A final. The remaining boats were sent to the B final.

==== Semifinal 1 ====
Rank	Rowers	Country	Time	Notes
1	Angus Groom; Jack Beaumont	Great Britain	6:06.59	FA
2	John Storey; Chris Harris	New Zealand	6:08.00	FA
3	Ioan Prundeanu; Marian Enache	Romania	6:08.17	FA
4	Mirosław Ziętarski; Mateusz Biskup	Poland	6:08.95	FB
5	Philip Doyle; Ronan Byrne	Ireland	6:10.95	FB
6	Tõnu Endrekson; Kaur Kuslap	Estonia	6:22.06	FB

==== Semifinal 2 ====
Rank	Rowers	Country	Time	Notes
1	Hugo Boucheron; Matthieu Androdias	France	6:07.73	FA
2	Barnabé Delarze; Roman Röösli	Switzerland	6:09.20	FA
3	Timo Piontek; Lars Hartig	Germany	6:09.70	FA
4	Amos Keijser; Nicolas van Sprang	Netherlands	6:16.13	FB
5	Erik Solbakken; Jan Helvig	Norway	6:20.36	FB
6	Boris Yotov; Kristian Vasilev	Bulgaria	6:50.43	FB

=== Finals ===
The A final determined the rankings for places 1 to 6. Additional rankings were determined in the other finals.

==== Final D ====
Rank	Rowers	Country	Time
1	Vasily Stepanov; Dmitry Khmylnin	Russia	6:25.31
2	Stephen Cox; Peter Purcell-Gilpin	Zimbabwe	6:26.31
3	Emanuele Fiume; Romano Battisti	Italy	6:28.86
4	Prem Nampratueng; Jaruwat Saensuk	Thailand	6:30.31
5	Mohamed Eissa; Mohamed El Shahawi	Egypt	6:37.37

==== Final C ====
Rank	Rowers	Country	Time
1	Cristian Rosso; Agustín Díaz	Argentina	6:15.58
2	John Graves; Benjamin Davison	United States	6:19.17
3	Artem Verestiuk; Heorhii Verteletskyi	Ukraine	6:20.87
4	Stefanos Douskos; Christos Steryiakas	Greece	6:25.60
5	Luka Radonić; Luka Baričević	Croatia	6:26.23
6	Nik Krebs; Miha Aljančič	Slovenia	DNS

==== Final B ====
Rank	Rowers	Country	Time
1	Amos Keijser; Nicolas van Sprang	Netherlands	6:05.10
2	Mirosław Ziętarski; Mateusz Biskup	Poland	6:05.45
3	Philip Doyle; Ronan Byrne	Ireland	6:08.81
4	Erik Solbakken; Jan Helvig	Norway	6:13.20
5	Tõnu Endrekson; Kaur Kuslap	Estonia	6:15.17
6	Boris Yotov; Kristian Vasilev	Bulgaria	6:20.50

==== Final A ====
Rank	Rowers	Country	Time
1st place, gold medalist(s)	Hugo Boucheron; Matthieu Androdias	France	6:05.16
2nd place, silver medalist(s)	Barnabé Delarze; Roman Röösli	Switzerland	6:06.49
3rd place, bronze medalist(s)	John Storey; Chris Harris	New Zealand	6:06.71
4	Angus Groom; Jack Beaumont	Great Britain	6:08.03
5	Timo Piontek; Lars Hartig	Germany	6:16.77
6	Ioan Prundeanu; Marian Enache	Romania	6:18.73
