= Rowing at the 2020 Summer Olympics – Men's double sculls =

Men's double sculls at the Games of the XXXII Olympiad
- Olympic rowing
- Venue: Sea Forest Waterway
- Dates: 23–28 July 2021
- Competitors: 26 from 13 nations
- Winning time: 6:00.33

Medalists
1st place, gold medalist(s)		Hugo Boucheron; Matthieu Androdias	France
2nd place, silver medalist(s)		Melvin Twellaar; Stef Broenink	Netherlands
3rd place, bronze medalist(s)		Liu Zhiyu; Zhang Liang	China

The men's double sculls event at the 2020 Summer Olympics took place from 23 to 28 July 2021 at the Sea Forest Waterway. 26 rowers from 13 nations competed.

== Background ==
This was the 25th appearance of the event, which was not held at the first Games in 1896 (when bad weather forced the cancellation of all rowing events), at the 1908 games, and at the 1912 games.

The defending medalists in the event were Croatia, Lithuania, and Norway. Lithuania is the only 2016 medalist in the competition.

== Qualification ==
Each National Olympic Committee (NOC) was limited to a single boat (one rower) in the event since 1912. There were 13 qualifying places in the men's double sculls:

- 11 from the 2019 World Championship
- 2 from the final qualification regatta

== Competition format ==
This rowing event is a double scull event, meaning that each boat is propelled by two rowers. The "scull" portion means that the rower uses two oars, one on each side of the boat; this contrasts with sweep rowing in which each rower has one oar and rows on only one side. The competition consists of multiple rounds. The competition continues to use the three-round format. Finals are held to determine the placing of each boat. The course uses the 2000 metres distance that became the Olympic standard in 1912.

During the first round three heats were held. The first three boats in each heat advanced to the semifinals, with the others relegated to the repechages.

The repechage is a round which offered rowers a second chance to qualify for the semifinals. Placing in the repechage determined which semifinal the boat would race in. The top three boats in the repechage move on to the semifinals, with the remaining boats being eliminated.

Two semifinals were held, each with 6 boats. The top three boats from each heat advanced to Final A and compete for a medal. The remaining boats advanced to Final B.

The third and final round was the finals. Each final determines a set of rankings. The A final determined the medals, along with the rest of the places through 6th, while the B final gives rankings from 7th to 12th.

== Schedule ==
The competition was held over six days.

All times are Japan Standard Time (UTC+9)

Date	Time	Round
Friday, 23 July 2021	10:30	Heats
Saturday, 24 July 2021	9:10	Repechage
Sunday, 25 July 2021	12:40	Semifinals A/B
Wednesday, 28 July 2021	8:20	Final B
Wednesday, 28 July 2021	9:30	Final A

== Results ==
=== Heats ===
The first three of each heat qualified for the semifinals, while the remainder went to the repechage.

==== Heat 1 ====
Rank	Lane	Rower	Nation	Time	Notes
1	4	Hugo Boucheron; Matthieu Androdias	France	6:10.45	Q
2	1	Zhiyu Liu; Liang Zhang	China	6:11.55	Q
3	3	Ilya Kondratyev; Andrey Potapkin	ROC	6:16.09	Q
4	5	Stephan Krueger; Marc Weber	Germany	6:35.11	R
5	2	Jakub Podrazil; Jan Cincibuch	Czech Republic	6:41.75	R

==== Heat 2 ====
Rank	Lane	Rower	Nation	Time	Notes
1	4	Miroslaw Zietarski; Mateusz Biskup	Poland	6:11.22	Q
2	1	Barnabe Delarze; Roman Roeoesli	Switzerland	6:11.24	Q
3	3	Jack Lopas; Christopher Harris	New Zealand	6:12.05	Q
4	2	Ronan Byrne; Philip Doyle	Ireland	6:14.40	R

==== Heat 3 ====
Rank	Lane	Rower	Nation	Time	Notes
1	4	Melvin Twellaar; Stef Broenink	Netherlands	6:08.38	Q (OB)
2	2	Graeme Thomas; John Collins	Great Britain	6:12.80	Q
3	3	Ioan Prundeanu; Marian Enache	Romania	6:13.62	Q
4	1	Saulius Ritter; Aurimas Adomavicius	Lithuania	6:23.08	R

=== Repechage ===
The first three pairs in the repechage qualified for the semifinals, while the fourth pair was eliminated.

Rank	Lane	Rower	Nation	Time	Notes
1	4	Stephan Krueger; Marc Weber	Germany	6:26.64	Q
2	2	Saulius Ritter; Aurimas Adomavicius	Lithuania	6:27.36	Q
3	3	Ronan Byrne; Philip Doyle	Ireland	6:29.90	Q
4	1	Jakub Podrazil; Jan Cincibuch	Czech Republic	6:32.86	

=== Semifinals ===
The first three of each heat qualify to the Final A, other to Final B

==== Semifinal A/B 1 ====
Rank	Lane	Rower	Nation	Time	Notes
1	3	Hugo Boucheron; Matthieu Androdias	France	6:20.45	FA
2	2	Graeme Thomas; John Collins	Great Britain	6:22.95	FA
3	4	Miroslaw Zietarski; Mateusz Biskup	Poland	6:24.50	FA
4	5	Jack Lopas; Christopher Harris	New Zealand	6:26.08	FB
5	1	Stephan Krueger; Marc Weber	Germany	6:38.41	FB
6	6	Ronan Byrne; Philip Doyle	Ireland	6:49.06	FB

==== Semifinal A/B 2 ====
Rank	Lane	Rower	Nation	Time	Notes
1	4	Melvin Twellaar; Stef Broenink	Netherlands	6:20.17	FA
2	5	Zhiyu Liu; Liang Zhang	China	6:23.11	FA
3	3	Barnabe Delarze; Roman Roeoesli	Switzerland	6:25.89	FA
4	6	Ilya Kondratyev; Andrey Potapkin	ROC	6:26.58	FB
5	2	Ioan Prundeanu; Marian Enache	Romania	6:29.55	FB
6	1	Saulius Ritter; Aurimas Adomavicius	Lithuania	6:34.04	FB

=== Finals ===
==== Final B ====
Rank	Lane	Rower	Nation	Time	Notes
1	3	Ilya Kondratyev; Andrey Potapkin	ROC	6:13.73	
2	4	Jack Lopas; Christopher Harris	New Zealand	6:15.51	
3	2	Ioan Prundeanu; Marian Enache	Romania	6:16.86	
4	6	Ronan Byrne; Philip Doyle	Ireland	6:16.89	
5	5	Stephan Krueger; Marc Weber	Germany	6:18.13	
6	1	Saulius Ritter; Aurimas Adomavicius	Lithuania	6.20.87	

==== Final A ====
Rank	Lane	Rower	Nation	Time	Notes
1st place, gold medalist(s)	3	Hugo Boucheron; Matthieu Androdias	France	6:00.33	OB
2nd place, silver medalist(s)	4	Melvin Twellaar; Stef Broenink	Netherlands	6:00.53	
3rd place, bronze medalist(s)	2	Liu Zhiyu; Zhang Liang	China	6:03.63	
4	5	Graeme Thomas; John Collins	Great Britain	6:06.48	
5	1	Barnabe Delarze; Roman Roeoesli	Switzerland	6:09.05	
6	6	Miroslaw Zietarski; Mateusz Biskup	Poland	6:09.17	
