= World Rowing Indoor Championships =

Championship founded in 2018

Tournament information
- Sport: Indoor rowing
- Established: 2018
- Administrator: World Rowing

The World Rowing Indoor Championships is an indoor rowing championship competition organised by World Rowing. The competition has been held annually since 2018. There have been championships organized in venues and with virtual formats.

The first edition in Alexandria in the USA saw 2,527 participants from 23 countries competing, including Para rowers.

The 2023 competition in Toronto, Canada was the first time a hybrid (virtual and in-person) competition was available to athletes. It was also the first time the Versa Challenge provided qualified athletes the opportunity to compete for the title of the most fit 'versatile' indoor rower in the world. Athletes competed in four surprise versa challenges over two days. Finland's Joel Naukkarinen and America's Elizabeth Gilmore earned the most points in the Men's and Women's Versa Challenge in February 2023.

== Venues ==
Year	Location
2018	(United States) Alexandria
2019	(United States) Long Beach
2020	(France) Paris
2021	Virtual
2022	Virtual
2023	(Canada) Toronto
2024	(Czech Republic) Prague
2025	Virtual
2026	Virtual

== Medallists ==
=== Men ===
==== 5,000 m ====
Year	Winner	Runner-up	Third
2026	Benjamin Reuter (GER)	Tomasz Cichocki (POL)	Artem Zakharov (UKR)

==== Lightweight 5,000 m ====
Year	Winner	Runner-up	Third
2026	Vaclav Valek (CZE)	Tamas Bence (HUN)	Jesús González Álvarez (ESP)

==== 2,000 m ====
Year	Winner	Runner-up	Third
2018	Jakub Podrazil (CZE)	Joel Naukkarinen (FIN)	Thomas Phifer (USA)
2019	Oliver Zeidler (GER)	Arne Landboe (USA)	Alexander Richards (USA)
2020	Alexander Vyazovkin (RUS)	Barnabe Delarze (SUI)	Matthieu Androdias (FRA)
2021	Ward Lemmelijn (BEL)	Bartosz Zablocki (POL)	Chirill Visit Chi-Sestakov (MDA)
2022	Ward Lemmelijn (BEL)	Alexander Vyazovkin (RUS)	Joel Naukkarinen (FIN)
2023	Oliver Zeidler (GER)	Ward Lemmelijn (BEL)	Jakub Podrazil (CZE)
2024	Ward Lemmelijn (BEL)	Michal Szpakowski (POL)	Jakub Podrazil (CZE)
2025	Ward Lemmelijn (BEL)	Jakub Podrazil (CZE)	Joel Naukkarinen (FIN)

==== Lightweight 2,000 m ====
Year	Winner	Runner-up	Third
2018	Artur Mikołajczewski (POL)	Matthias Taborsky (AUT)	Alistair Bond (NZL)
2019	Jason Osborne (GER)	Martino Goretti (ITA)	Alex Twist (USA)
2020	Pierre Houin (FRA)	Thibault Colard (FRA)	Martino Goretti (ITA)
2021	Florian Roller (GER)	Martino Goretti (ITA)	Boudina Sid Ali (ALG)
2022	Florian Roller (GER)	Boudina Sid Ali (ALG)	Ahmet Rapi (SWE)
2023	Jiri Simanek (CZE)	Florian Roller (GER)	Moritz Marchart (GER)
2024	Florian Roller (GER)	Jiri Simanek (CZE)	Jerzy Kowalski (POL)
2025	Afonso Duarte Costa (POR)	Joao Santos (POR)	Álvaro Alvedro (ESP)

==== 1000 m ====
Year	Winner	Runner-up	Third
2026	Andrea Panizza (ITA)	Thomas Vinther (DEN)	Seyed Mohammad Hossein Salehi (IRI)

==== Lightweight 1000 m ====
Year	Winner	Runner-up	Third
2026	André Dias (POR)	Ales Manuel Papacek (CZE)	Markus Ilmarinen (FIN)

==== 500 m ====
Year	Winner	Runner-up	Third
2020	Phil Clapp (GBR)	Joel Naukkarinen (FIN)	Vincent Matz (FRA)
2021	Phil Clapp (GBR)	Anton Bondarenko (UKR)	Joel Naukkarinen (FIN)
2022	Phil Clapp (GBR)	Cameron Wharram (CAN)	Anton Grassi (SVK)
2023	Phil Clapp (GBR)	Cameron Wharram (CAN)	Matt Snare (USA)
2024	Joonas Kuivalainen (FIN)	Thomas Wilson (GBR)	Chris Scott (GBR)
2025	Joonas Kuivalainen (FIN)	Matt Snare (USA)	Spyridon Kalentzis (GRE)

==== Lightweight 500 m ====
Year	Winner	Runner-up	Third
2020	Adrien Decriem (FRA) Damián Alonso (ESP)		Michal Zawadzki (POL)
2021	Benjamin Smith (AUS)	Martino Goretti (ITA)	William Legge (AUS)
2022	Mohamed Kota (EGY)	Chen Sensen (CHN)	Daniel Satch (GBR)
2023	Giovanni Ficarra (ITA)	José Daniel Martínez López (ESP)	Mohamed Kota (EGY)
2024	Mohamed Kota (EGY)	Francisco Pizana Iniesta (ESP)	Ahmed Meshref (EGY)
2025	Joonas Mäkipelto (FIN)	Adham Maghoub (EGY)	Amirreza Ebdali (IRI)

==== 1 hour ====
Year	Winner	Runner-up	Third
2021	Benjamin Reuter (GER)	Joel Naukkarinen (FIN)	Tom Solesbury (GBR)

==== 1 minute ====
Year	Winner	Runner-up	Third
2026	Thomas Vinther (DEN)	Andrea Panizza (ITA)	Anders Edquist (SWE)

==== Lightweight 1 minute ====
Year	Winner	Runner-up	Third
2026	Joonas Makipelto (FIN)	Mohammad Abdul Rehman (PAK)	Youssef Abdelaziz (EGY)

==== Team ====
Year	Winner	Runner-up	Third
2021 (3 minutes)	Finland 1 (FIN)	Egyptian National Team (EGY)	UK Armed Forces (GBR)
2022 (3 minutes)	Finland (FIN); Egyptian Rowing Federation (EGY)		No Rowing For Old Men (GBR)
2023 (2000m)	The International Men of Mystery	No Rowing For Old Men (GER)	Team FINLAND (FIN)
2024 (2000m)	The International Men of Mystery	Team FINLAND (FIN)	Czech Team (CZE)
2025 (2000m)	Team FINLAND (FIN)	NewWave Crossfit (GBR)	Gym Mettle (USA)

=== Team Relay 5000m ===
Year	Winner	Runner-up	Third
2025	Team FINLAND (FIN)	NewWave Crossfit (GBR)	Titans of Piraeus (GRE)

==== Team Relay 1000 m ====
Year	Winner	Runner-up	Third
2026	Kouvolan Soutajat / Team Finland (FIN)	FIN (FIN)	SILVERBACKS TEAM (GRE)

=== Women ===
==== 5,000 m ====
Year	Winner	Runner-up	Third
2026	Lina Belanger (CAN)	María Ángeles Macian (ESP)	Terje Leola (EST)

==== Lightweight 5,000 m ====
Year	Winner	Runner-up	Third
2026	Elena Chevrier Da Costa (POR)	Jillian Tovey (GBR)	Sarita Kristina Hansen (DEN)

==== 2,000 m ====
Year	Winner	Runner-up	Third
2018	Olena Buryak (UKR)	Luisa Neerschulte (GER)	Rui Ju (CHN)
2019	Olena Buryak (UKR)	Brooke Mooney (USA)	Tracy Eisser (USA)
2020	Olena Buryak (UKR)	Helene Lefebvre (FRA)	Elodie Ravera (FRA)
2021	Kirsten Kline (USA)	Sophie Souwer (NED)	Marilou Duvernay Tardif (CAN)
2022	Zhang Peixin (CHN)	Lv Yang (CHN)	Olena Buryak (UKR)
2023	Olena Buryak (UKR)	Kasia Gruchalla-Wesierski (CAN)	Sydney Payne (CAN)
2024	Pavlina Flamikova (CZE)	Anna Santruckova (CZE)	Kathryn Mole (GBR)
2025	Elizabeth Gilmore (USA)	Louise Lefebvre (FRA)	María Ángeles Macian (ESP)

==== Lightweight 2,000 m ====
Year	Winner	Runner-up	Third
2018	Christine Cavallo (USA)	Emily Schmieg (USA)	Kathryn Schiro (USA)
2019	Justine Reston (GBR)	Katelin Guregian (USA)	Toni Harding (USA)
2020	Laura Tarantola (FRA)	Marie Margot Joannes (FRA)	Jilly Tovey (GBR)
2021	Paula Pankratiew (POL)	Olga Svirska (LAT)	Krimi Khadija (TUN)
2022	Min Yang (CHN)	Jiaqi Zou (CHN)	Lai Weijuan (CHN)
2023	Krimi Khadija (TUN)	Silke Tamborijn (BEL)	Elisa Arcara (ITA)
2024	Bruna Parente (POR)	Barbora Podrazilova (CZE)	Zoe Dickson (DEN)
2025	Martyna Radosz (POL)	Bruna Parente (POR)	Nourelhoda Arafa (EGY)

==== 1000 m ====
Year	Winner	Runner-up	Third
2026	Adelle Ader (EST)	Elizabeth Gilmore (USA)	Sophie Souwer (ITA)

==== Lightweight 1000 m ====
Year	Winner	Runner-up	Third
2026	Martyna Radosz (POL)	Meriam Mamieliekova (UKR)	Inés Olivera (POR)

==== 500 m ====
Year	Winner	Runner-up	Third
2020	Olena Buryak (UKR)	Lucie Giraud (FRA)	Rhian Rudkin (GBR)
2021	Ana do Carmo Caldas (POR)	Joanne Clapp (GBR)	Bianca Piloseno (USA)
2022	Bianca Piloseno (USA)	Olena Buryak (UKR)	Jade Lally (GBR)
2023	Olena Buryak (UKR)	Sonja Pentola (FIN)	Clara Hogan (IRL)
2024	Iida Niemi (FIN)	Sarah Maria Johansen (DEN)	Emma Simpson (GBR)
2025	Stefanie Preiksa (AUS)	Ella Fox (USA)	Kees Karpatskij (FIN)

==== Lightweight 500 m ====
Year	Winner	Runner-up	Third
2020	Jilly Tovey (GBR)	Laura Barrigan (GBR)	Selma Dhaouadi (FRA)
2021	Anna Hughes-Davies (GBR)	Krimi Khadija (TUN)	Rouba Amina (ALG)
2022	Jiaqi Zou (CHN)	Tan Jinlian (CHN)	Nourelhoda Arafa (EGY)
2023	Krimi Khadija (TUN)	Sarita Kristina Hansen (DEN)	Laura Barrigan (GBR)
2024	Sarita Kristina Hansen (DEN)	Laura Allen (GBR)	Nourelhoda Arafa (EGY)
2025	Meriam Mamieliekova (UKR)	Sarita Kristina Hansen (DEN)	Nourelhoda Arafa (EGY)

==== 1 hour ====
Year	Winner	Runner-up	Third
2021	Margit Haahr Hansen (DEN)	Ghada Ibrahim (EGY)	Larysa Zhalinska (UKR)

==== 1 minute ====
Year	Winner	Runner-up	Third
2026	Var Guriadottir Hansen (DEN)	Irmelin Olsson (SWE)	Kees Karpatskij (FIN)

==== Lightweight 1 minute ====
Year	Winner	Runner-up	Third
2026	Tatiana Melamed (AIN)	Carolina Leonhardt (ARG); Jillian Tovey (GBR)	

==== Team ====
Year	Winner	Runner-up	Third
2021 (3 minutes)	Egyptian National Team (EGY)	Finland (FIN)	Danish Masters Team (DEN)
2022 (3 minutes)	Finland (FIN)	British Army (GBR)	Mannheim-Karlsruhe (GER)
2023 (2000m)	Team FINLAND (FIN)	Nordisch by Nature (GER)	Team Live2Row (USA)
2024 (2000m)	Team FINLAND (FIN)	Sexy Erg Screens	Impeccable Transitions
2025	Team FINLAND (FIN)	Impeccable Transitions	Swift Strokes 2.0

==== Team relay 5000m ====
Year	Winner	Runner-up	Third
2025 (2000m)	Team FINLAND (FIN)	Golden Horseshoe Rowing (CAN)	Rowers' Relay: Forward to Victory (UKR)

==== Team Relay 1000 m ====
Year	Winner	Runner-up	Third
2026	Les gravelinoises (FRA)	NW GRL PWR	Czech Erg Power (CZE)

=== Mixed ===
==== 5,000 m team relay ====
Year	Winner	Runner-up	Third
2026	Team FINLAND (FIN)	Silverbacks Team (GRE)	UKS MOS Elk (POL)

==== 2,000 m team relay ====
Year	Winner	Runner-up	Third
2021	Finland 1 (FIN)	Egyptian National Team (EGY)	Concept Fitness
2022	Egyptian National Team (EGY)	Finland (FIN)	British Army (GBR)
2023	Team FINLAND (FIN)	Freespeed	KSA Team Mix (KSA)
2024	Team FINLAND (FIN)	Freespeed	Dream Team 2024

==== 1,000 m team relay ====
Year	Winner	Runner-up	Third
2026	2.7kW	FIN (FIN)	Estonian DryRowers (EST)
