= Zhang Liang (rower) =

Chinese rower

Personal information
- Nationality: Chinese
- Born: 14 January 1987 (age 39) Jinzhou, China
- Height: 1.90 m (6 ft 3 in)
- Weight: 90 kg (198 lb)

Sport
- Country: China
- Sport: Rowing
- Event: Double sculls
- Club: Hunan
Medal record
Men's rowing
Representing China
Olympic Games
Bronze medal – third place	2020 Tokyo	Double sculls
World Championships
Gold medal – first place	2019 Ottensheim	Double sculls
Asian Games
Gold medal – first place	2010 Guangzhou	Double sculls
Gold medal – first place	2014 Incheon	Double sculls
Gold medal – first place	2018 Jakarta–Palembang	Single sculls
Gold medal – first place	2022 Hangzhou	Single sculls
Gold medal – first place	2022 Hangzhou	Double sculls

Zhang Liang (Chinese: 张亮; pinyin: Zhāng Liàng; born 14 January 1987) is a Chinese rower who competed for Team China at the 2008 Summer Olympics and the 2012 Summer Olympics.

Zhang gained international notoriety when he failed to show up for the men's single sculls at the 2008 Olympics and was therefore also disqualified from the doubles event in line with international rowing rules.

At the 2012 Summer Olympics, he only competed in the single sculls, finishing 11th.

In the 2019 and 2021 World Rowing Championships, Zhang competed with Liu Zhiyu taking gold in the men's double sculls event.

== Major performances ==
- 2007 World Cup Amsterdam – 8th single sculls
- 2019 World Rowing Championships Ottensheim - 1st double sculls
- 2021 World Rowing Championships Lucerne - 1st double sculls
