= Jack Lopas =

New Zealand rower (born 1998)

Personal information
- Nationality: New Zealand
- Born: 5 October 1998 (age 27) Christchurch, New Zealand

Sport
- Country: New Zealand
- Sport: Rowing
- Event: Double scull
- Club: Canterbury Rowing Club
Medal record
Men's rowing
Representing New Zealand
World U23 Championships
| Gold medal – first place | 2017 Plovdiv | BM4x |
| Silver medal – second place | 2019 Sarasota | BM2x |
World Junior Championships
| Gold medal – first place | 2016 Rotterdam | JM2x |

Jack Lopas (born 5 October 1998) is a New Zealand rower. He is nominated to compete at the 2020 Tokyo Olympics in the double sculls in a team with Chris Harris.

== Early life ==
Lopas was born in 1998 in Christchurch, New Zealand. Rowing runs in the family, with his grandfather Geoff Lopas representing his country at the 1978 World Rowing Championships in the quad scull and going to the Olympics as a reserve rower. His parents met at the Christchurch rowing venue Kerr's Reach; that part of the Avon River / Ōtākaro where clubs and schools have their boathouses. He received his education at Christchurch Boys' High School. In 2017, he went to Yale University to study American History. In May 2021, his younger brother Edward was selected as a representative rower for New Zealand's U19 squad.

== Rowing career ==
Lopas took up rowing in 2013 and is a member of the Canterbury Rowing Club. Rowing for his school, he came third in the U16 coxed quad scull at the March 2014 Maadi Cup and says that this bronze medal made him "addicted to rowing". At his first New Zealand National Championships in February 2015, he came fourth in the U19 double scull. He was chosen to represent New Zealand at the 2015 World Rowing Junior Championships in junior men's double scull in Rio de Janeiro, Brazil, and he came second in the B-final. At the February 2016 New Zealand National Championships, he came first in the U19 double scull. At the 2016 World Rowing Junior Championships in Rotterdam, Netherlands, he won gold in the junior men's double scull teamed up with Lenny Jenkins, a rival from Whakatāne who beat him in three boat classes at the 2015 Maadi Cup. At the February 2017 New Zealand National Championships, he came first in the U20 single scull, first in the U22 quad scull, and second in the U22 double scull. At the July 2017 World Rowing U23 Championships in Plovdiv, Bulgaria, he won gold in the quad scull.

Lopas moved to the United States for university study in 2017, choosing Yale as they have a heavyweight rowing team. It was Rowing New Zealand's policy to not select athletes for the national squad if they were based overseas. Lopas and fellow New Zealander Ollie Maclean, who studied at the University of California, Berkeley, were the first rowers where Rowing NZ made an exception. The team was sent to the 2019 World Rowing U23 Championships in Sarasota, Florida, United States, where they won silver behind an Italian team.

When the COVID-19 pandemic hit, Lopas took time off from Yale to return to New Zealand in November 2020. Having gone through managed isolation, he joined the New Zealand squad in early January 2021. At the February 2021 nationals, he won two senior titles: in single scull and, teamed up with Tom Mackintosh, in double scull. The New Zealand rowing squad for the 2020 Tokyo Olympics was announced in June 2021 and Lopas was teamed up with double-Olympian Chris Harris in the double scull.
