= Artem Zakharov =

Artem Zakharov may refer to:

- Artem Zakharov (footballer) (born 1996), Ukrainian footballer
- Artem Zakharov (swimmer), Russian, participated in Swimming at the 2008 Summer Paralympics – Men's 100 metre breaststroke SB6
- Artyom Zakharov (born 1991), Kazakhstani cyclist
