= John Storey (rower) =

New Zealand rower

Personal information
- Born: 19 July 1987 (age 38)
- Height: 1.86 m (6 ft 1 in)
- Weight: 85 kg (187 lb)
Medal record
Men's rowing
Representing New Zealand
World Championships
Gold medal – first place	2017 Sarasota	Double sculls
Bronze medal – third place	2018 Plovdiv	Double sculls

John Storey (born 19 July 1987) is a New Zealand rower. He competed at the Olympics in 2012 and 2016, and won a world championship title in double scull in 2017 alongside Chris Harris. Storey announced his retirement from international rowing in April 2021.

== Family and private life ==
Storey was born in England and grew up in Cambridge. His family moved to Christchurch in New Zealand when he was 13 years old as his father, Bryan Storey, took a teaching position at the University of Canterbury. His younger sister, Jenny Storey, has represented New Zealand with the Black Sticks. Storey had finished three of the four years of a mechanical engineering degree at the University of Canterbury when he was selected to join the New Zealand rowing team in 2008. He postponed his engineering degree and moved to the Waikato to be able to train at Lake Karapiro. While there, he studied finance extra-murally. Storey took 2013 off from rowing and finished his mechanical engineering degree.

Storey is engaged to former rower Louise Trappitt.

== Rowing ==
Storey started rowing in 2003 and rows for the Avon Rowing Club based in Christchurch. He first represented New Zealand overseas at the World Rowing U23 Championships in 2009 in the men's coxed four in Račice, Czech Republic, where he won gold with team mates Ian Seymour, Tobias Wehr-Candler, David Eade, and Matthew Cameron (cox). He joined New Zealand's men's quadruple sculls team in 2010 and was a member until 2012, and again from 2014 onwards; he took a year off from rowing in 2013. The team went to the 2012 Summer Olympics and won the B final; his team mates were Michael Arms, Robbie Manson, and Matthew Trott.

At the 2015 World Rowing Championships at Lac d'Aiguebelette, Aiguebelette in France, the team made of Karl Manson, Storey, George Bridgewater, and Jade Uru came third in the B final and missed the 2016 Summer Olympics qualifying time by 5/100-second, being narrowly beaten by Ukraine for the eights and final qualifying place. At the Olympic qualifying regatta in Lucerne, Switzerland, in May 2016—the last chance to qualify for the 2016 Olympics—they came third behind teams from Russia and Canada, and thus did not qualify. After a positive doping test returned by Russian crew member Sergey Fedorovtsev, the Russian team was disqualified by the world rowing federation and the New Zealand team was assigned an Olympic quota spot. For the competition in Rio, Manson was replaced by Nathan Flannery in the bow.

On 12 April 2021, Storey announced his retirement from rowing.
