= Joel Naukkarinen =

Finnish rower

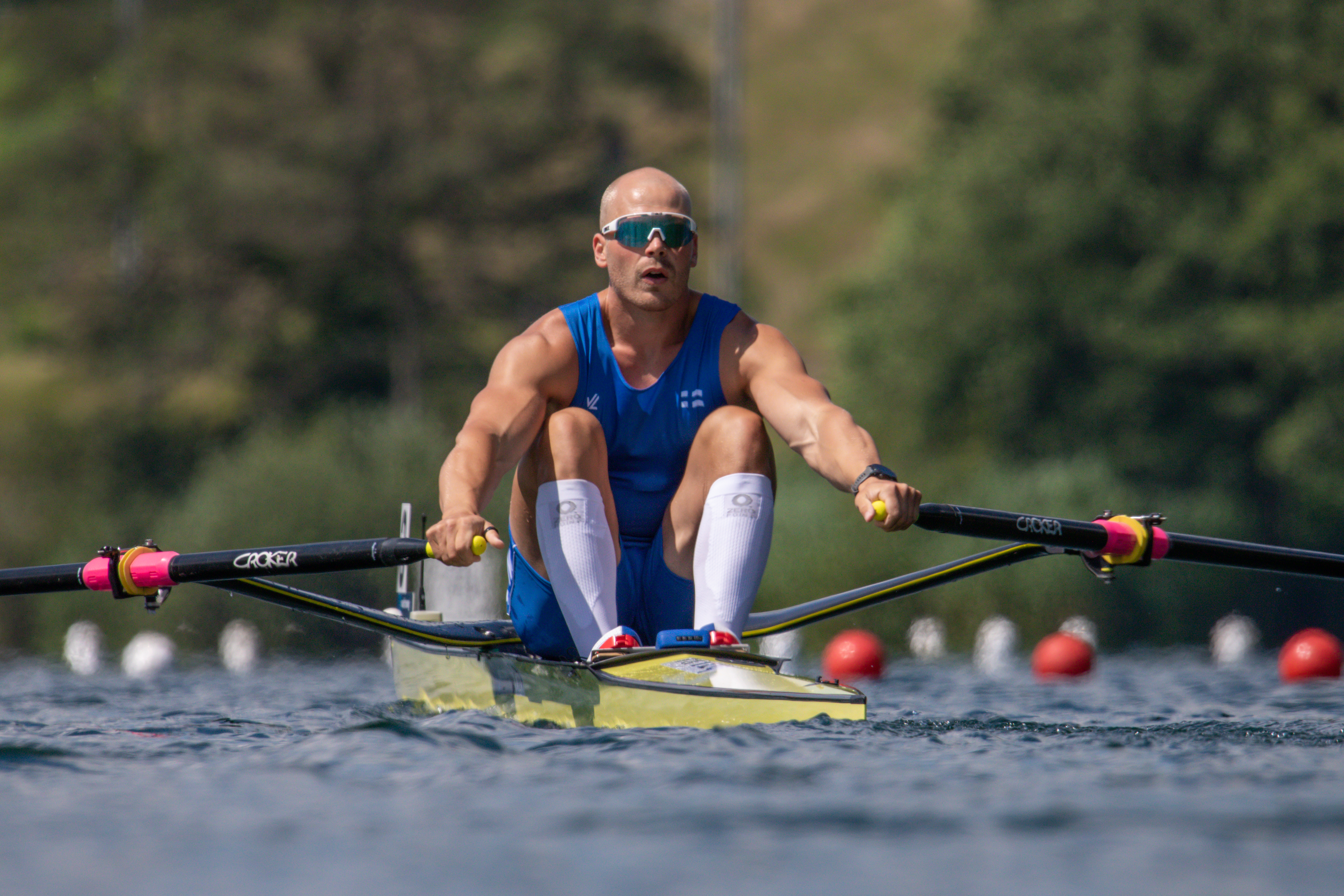
- Joel Naukkarinen rowing in 2022

Personal information
- National team: Finland
- Citizenship: Finnish
- Born: Joel Kristian Naukkarinen; 30 March 1993 (age 33) Kouvola, Finland
- Occupation(s): Rower, doctor, researcher
- Website: rowingfinn.com/en/

Sport
- Sport: Olympic rowing, coastal rowing, indoor rowing

Achievements and titles
- Personal bests: Ergometer 5:46.1; Olympic unit 6:53.6 (2,000 m); 100 km – 6:06:06.1

Joel Kristian Naukkarinen (born 30 March 1993) is a competitive Finnish rower. Naukkarinen is a four-time world champion in indoor rowing, a ten-time World Championship medalist and a three-time European Championship medalist.

Naukkarinen holds 16 Finnish records and one standing world record. Naukkarinen has 152 Finnish Championship medals. Naukkarinen has won the Nordic Championships in 2015 and 2022.

In February 2022, Naukkarinen was awarded Rower of the Month by the World Rowing Federation.

== Championship medals ==
Indoor rowing:

- 2018, World Championships, silver medal, 2,000 m, Alexandria, USA
- 2019, European Championships, bronze medal, 2,000 m, Copenhagen, Denmark
- 2019, European Championships, gold medal, 200 m, Copenhagen, Denmark
- 2020, European Championships, bronze medal, 500 m, Prague, Czech Republic
- 2020, World Championships, silver medal, 500 m, Paris, France
- 2021, World Championships, gold medal, men's team relay, virtual competition (Joel Naukkarinen, Toni Koski, Mika Viitakangas, Teemu Keljo)
- 2021, World Championships, bronze medal, 500 m, virtual competition
- 2021, World Championships, silver medal, one-hour rowing, virtual competition
- 2021, World Championships, gold medal, mixed team relay, virtual competition (Joel Naukkarinen, Toni Koski, Sonja Peltola, Anni Keisanen)
- 2022, World Championships, gold medals, men's team relay, Hamburg, Germany (Joel Naukkarinen, Joonas Kuivalainen, Martti Kirjola, Sam Zerlik)
- 2022, World Championships, gold medal, mixed team relay, Hamburg, Germany (Joel Naukkarinen, Joonas Kuivalainen, Sonja Peltola, Anni Keisanen)
- 2022, World Championships, bronze medal, 2,000 m, Hamburg, Germany
- 2023, European Championships, silver medal, 2,000 m, Paris, France

Beach Sprints:

- 2022, World Finals, bronze medal, Saundersfoot, Wales

== Indoor rowing ==
In 2015, Naukkarinen became the first men's open category rower to win the Finnish Championship title in all distances (500 m, 2,000 m, 10,000 m and 42,195 m).

In total Naukkarinen has won 9 World Championship medals and 4 European Championship medals in indoor rowing.

Naukkarinen has broken the world records for 100 m, one minute and 100 kilometers. His 100 kilometer record of 6:06:06.1 (average speed 1:49.8/500 m) is still standing, from when Naukkarinen rowed at the Kuopio Market Square at the opening of the Christmas season on 24 November 2018.

In January 2023, Naukkarinen earned the silver for the men's 2,000 m at the European World Indoor Championships in Paris, France with a time of 05:51.5.

In November 2022, Naukkarinen qualified and was invited to participate in the World Rowing Indoor Championships in Mississauga, Canada. He ranked first out of 10 men invited to the Versa Challenge to determine the most fit versatile rower in the world. On 26 March 2023, Naukkarinen earned the title of World Indoor Rowing Versa Champion after completing 4 indoor rowing events over 2 days.

=== Finnish records ===
Naukkarinen has several Finnish records in indoor rowing.

Distance	Series	IT	/500 m	Holder	Date
500 m	U23	1:14.8	1:14.8	Joel Naukkarinen	4 October 2014
500 m	Open	1:13.5	1:13.5	Joel Naukkarinen	26 January 2022
1,000 m	U23	2:44.1	1:22.0	Joel Naukkarinen	24 January 2015
1,000 m	Open	2:42.6	1:21.3	Joel Naukkarinen	28 January 2017
2,000 m	U23	5:54.0	1:28.5	Joel Naukkarinen	31 January 2015
2,000 m	Open	5:46.1	1:26.5	Joel Naukkarinen	26 February 2022
5,000 m	U19	17:18,8	1:43.9	Joel Naukkarinen	19 March 2011
10,000 m	U23	32:44.8	1:38.2	Joel Naukkarinen	15 March 2015
10,000 m	Open	32:08.5	1:36.4	Joel Naukkarinen	15 February 2022
21,097 m	U20	1:14:56.9	1:46.5	Joel Naukkarinen	21 April 2012
21,097 m	U23	1:14:56.9	1:46.5	Joel Naukkarinen	21 April 2012
21,097 m	Open	1:14:56.9	1:46.5	Joel Naukkarinen	21 April 2012
42,195 m	U23	2:26:00.5	1:43.8	Joel Naukkarinen	25 April 2015
42,195 m	Open	2:26:00.5	1:43.8	Joel Naukkarinen	25 April 2015
Team 4 × 1,000 m Men	Open	2:52.5	1:26.3	Joel Naukkarinen; Antti Kilpeläinen; Martti Kirjola; Antti Kirjola	23 January 2016
Team 4 × 1,000 m Open mixed team	Open	3:09.9	1:35.0	Joel Naukkarinen; Kasper Hirvilampi; Eeva Karppinen; Suvi Karppinen	3 February 2018

== Beach Sprints ==
In the 2022 World Rowing Beach Sprint Finals, Naukkarinen won Finland's first medal at the championships.

== Personal life ==
His cousins from maternal side are Finland national basketball team player Alexander Madsen and Finland national volleyball team players Michaela Madsen and Yasmine Madsen.
