= Agustín Díaz =

Argentine footballer (born 1988)

Personal information
- Full name: Agustín Hernán Díaz
- Date of birth: 5 May 1988 (age 38)
- Place of birth: Villa Carlos Paz, Argentina
- Height: 1.72 m (5 ft 7 1/2 in)
- Position: Midfielder

Team information
- Current team: Canicattì

Senior career*
Years	Team	Apps	(Gls)
2006–2017	Talleres	151	(17)
2015	→ Godoy Cruz (loan)	6	(0)
2016	→ Atlético de Rafaela (loan)	10	(0)
2017–2019	Agropecuario	15	(0)
2021–2022	Ferro (General Pico)	29	(1)
2022	Arbus		
2022	Fasano	12	(2)
2022–	Canicattì	10	(0)
- * Club domestic league appearances and goals as of 8 October 2023

Agustín Hernán Díaz (born 5 May 1988) is an Argentine professional footballer who plays as a midfielder for Italian Serie D club Canicattì.

== Career ==
Díaz began his senior career in 2006 with Talleres, making five appearances during the 2006–07 Primera B Nacional campaign. Three seasons later, in Torneo Argentino A, he scored his first goal for the club on 23 August 2009 in a home defeat to Juventud Unida Universitario; which was one of four goals in 2009–10. In 2015, after seventeen goals in one hundred and fifty-one league appearances, Díaz completed a loan move Godoy Cruz of the Argentine Primera División. He made his top-flight bow on 21 February during a 2–1 loss to Estudiantes. He was selected five more times for Godoy Cruz as they placed 22nd.

The 2016 Argentine Primera División season saw Díaz loaned to Atlético de Rafaela. Ten appearances followed. He returned to Talleres for 2016–17, but departed the club a year later without featuring to join Primera B Nacional's Agropecuario.

== Career statistics ==
As of 4 November 2018.

Club statistics
Club	Season	League			Cup (Note: Includes the Copa Argentina)		League Cup		Continental		Other		Total	
Club	Season	Division	Apps	Goals	Apps	Goals	Apps	Goals	Apps	Goals	Apps	Goals	Apps	Goals
Talleres	2006–07	Primera B Nacional	5	0	0	0	—		—		0	0	5	0
Talleres	2012–13	Torneo Argentino A	25	1	2	1	—		—		0	0	27	2
Talleres	2013–14	Primera B Nacional	33	2	2	0	—		—		0	0	35	2
Talleres	2014	Torneo Federal A	15	2	2	0	—		—		6 (Note: Six appearances in the 2014 Torneo Federal A play-offs)	0	23	2
Talleres	2015	Torneo Federal A	0	0	0	0	—		—		0	0	0	0
Talleres	2016	Primera B Nacional	0	0	0	0	—		—		0	0	0	0
Talleres	2016–17	Primera División	0	0	0	0	—		—		0	0	0	0
Talleres	Total		78	5	6	1	—		—		6	0	90	6
Godoy Cruz (loan)	2015	Primera División	6	0	1	0	—		—		0	0	7	0
Atlético de Rafaela (loan)	2016	Primera División	10	0	0	0	—		—		0	0	10	0
Agropecuario	2017–18	Primera B Nacional	6	0	0	0	—		—		0	0	6	0
Agropecuario	2018–19	Primera B Nacional	7	0	0	0	—		—		0	0	7	0
Agropecuario	Total		13	0	0	0	—		—		0	0	13	0
Career total			107	5	7	1	—		—		6	0	120	6

== Honours ==
Talleres

- Torneo Argentino A: 2012–13
