= Christos Stergiakas =

Greek rower

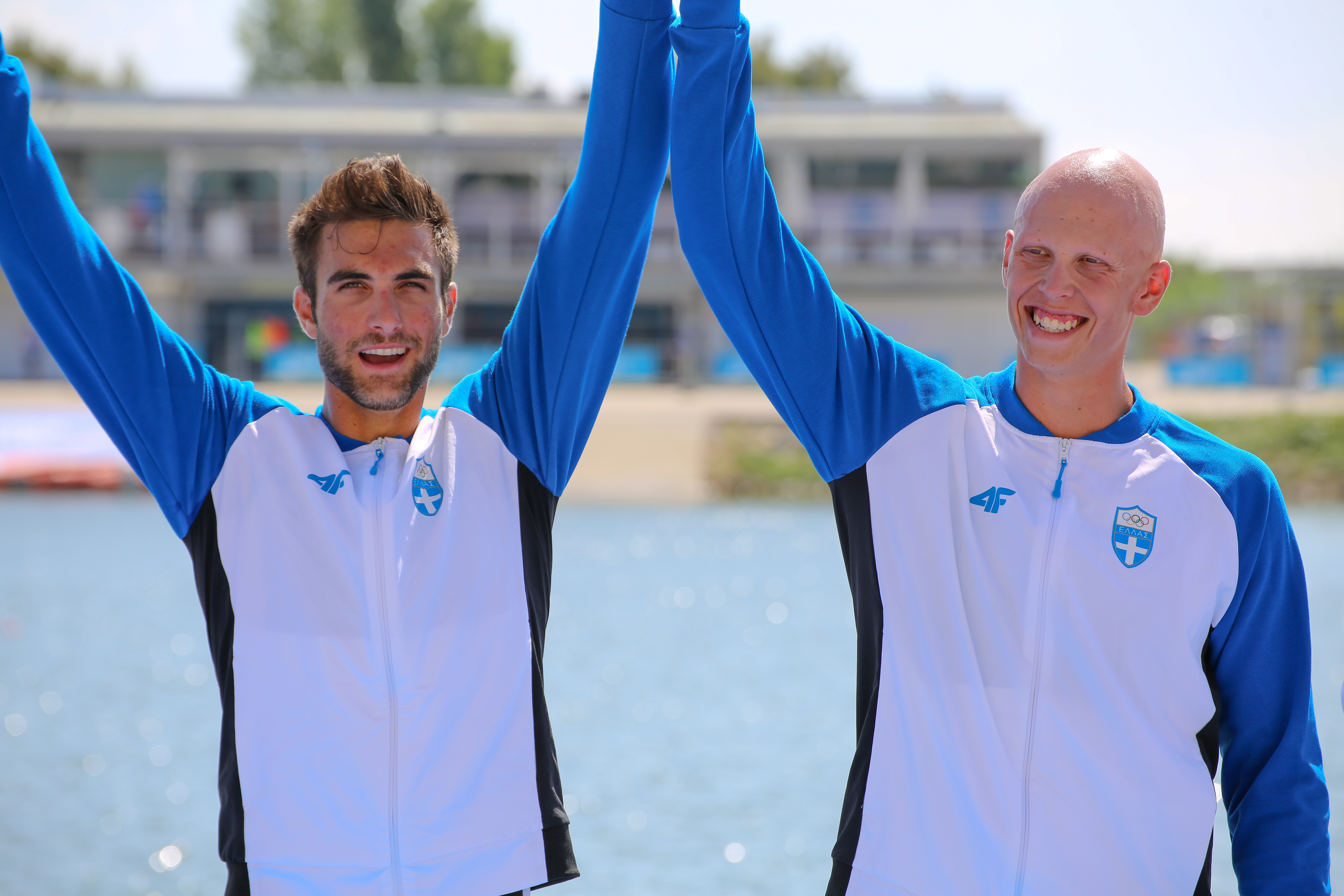
- Stefanos Ntouskos and Christos Steryiakas

Personal information
- Nationality: Greek
- Born: 11 March 1999 (age 27)
- Height: 1.93 m (6 ft 4 in)
- Weight: 91 kg (201 lb)

Sport
- Country: Greece
- Sport: Rowing
Medal record
World Rowing U23 Championships
Gold medal – first place	2018 Poznań	BM2X
Gold medal – first place	2021 Račice	BM2X
European Rowing U23 Championships
Gold medal – first place	2017 Kruszwica	BM2X
Gold medal – first place	2018 Brest	BM2X
Silver medal – second place	2021 Kruszwica	BM2X
World Rowing Junior Championships
Bronze medal – third place	2017 Trakai	JM2X
Mediterranean Games
Gold medal – first place	2018 Tarragona	M2x

Christos Stergiakas is a Greek rower from Kastoria. Along with Stefanos Ntouskos, he won a gold medal for Greece, at the 2018 Mediterranean Games.
