= Mirosław Ziętarski =

Polish rower (born 1993)

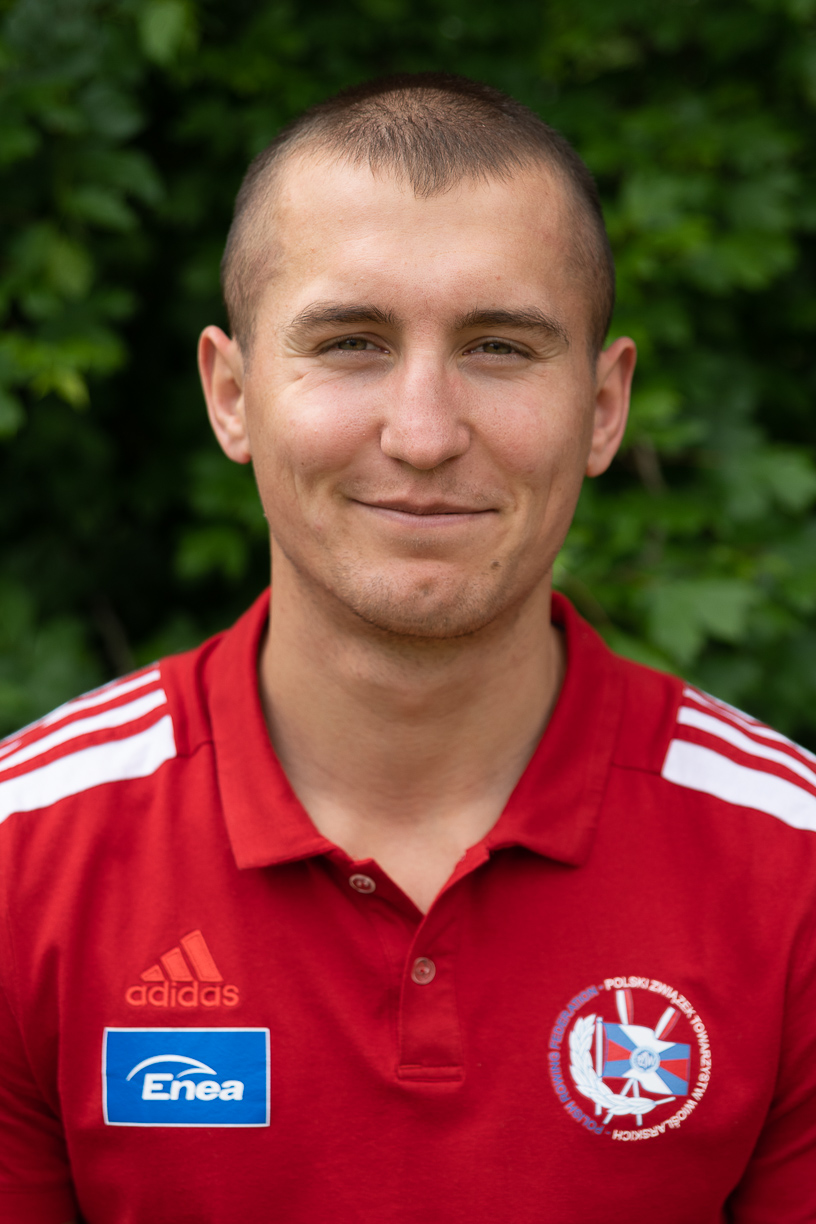
- Ziętarski in 2019

Personal information
- Born: 9 March 1993 (age 33) Ciechocin, Poland
- Height: 1.90 m (6 ft 3 in)
- Weight: 89 kg (196 lb)

Sport
- Country: Poland
- Sport: Rowing
- Events: Double sculls Quadruple sculls
- Club: AZS UMK Toruń
Medal record
Men's rowing
Representing Poland
Olympic Games
| Bronze medal – third place | 2024 Paris | Quadruple sculls |
World Championships
| Gold medal – first place | 2022 Račice | Quadruple sculls |
| Gold medal – first place | 2025 Shanghai | Double sculls |
| Silver medal – second place | 2017 Sarasota | Double sculls |
| Bronze medal – third place | 2019 Ottensheim | Double sculls |
| Bronze medal – third place | 2023 Belgrade | Quadruple sculls |
European Championships
| Gold medal – first place | 2019 Lucerne | Double sculls |
| Gold medal – first place | 2023 Bled | Quadruple sculls |
| Gold medal – first place | 2025 Plovdiv | Double sculls |
| Silver medal – second place | 2017 Račice | Double sculls |
| Silver medal – second place | 2022 Oberschleißheim | Quadruple sculls |
| Silver medal – second place | 2026 Varese | Quadruple sculls |
| Bronze medal – third place | 2024 Szeged | Quadruple sculls |

Mirosław Ziętarski (born 9 March 1993) is a Polish rower. He competed at the 2016 and 2020 Summer Olympics, in the men's quadruple sculls and men's double sculls events, respectively.

At the 2024 Summer Olympics, he won a bronze medal in the quadruple sculls.
