= Liu Zhiyu =

Chinese rower (born 1993)

Personal information
- Born: 5 January 1993 (age 33) Shenzhen, China

Sport
- Country: China
- Sport: Rowing
- Event(s): Double sculls, Quadruple sculls
Medal record
Men's rowing
Representing China
Olympic Games
Bronze medal – third place	2020 Tokyo	Double sculls
World Championships
Gold medal – first place	2019 Ottensheim	Double sculls
Asian Games
Gold medal – first place	2014 Incheon	Quadruple sculls
Gold medal – first place	2022 Hangzhou	Double sculls
Asian Championships
Gold medal – first place	2015 Beijing	Quadruple sculls

Liu Zhiyu (Chinese: 刘治宇; born 5 January 1993) is a Chinese rower.

He won a medal at the 2019 World Rowing Championships.
