= Luke Letcher =

Australian rower

Personal information
- Born: 11 June 1994 (age 32) Canberra, Australian Capital Territory, Australia
- Education: Radford College, Canberra
- Height: 205 cm (6 ft 9 in)

Sport
- Sport: Rowing
- Event: Men's Quadruple Sculls (M4x)
- Club: Black Mountain Rowing Club

Achievements and titles
- National finals: King's Cup (8+) 2015; President's Cup (1X) 2015-17; Australian champion (4X) 2017
Medal record
Men's rowing
Representing Australia
Olympic Games
Bronze medal – third place	2020 Tokyo	Quad scull
U23 World Championships
Gold medal – first place	2016 Rotterdam	BM4X

Luke Letcher (born 11 June 1994) is an Australian representative rower - a national champion, an underage world champion and an Olympian. He won a world title at the 2016 World Rowing U23 Championships in Australia's U23 quad scull. He raced in the Australian men's quad scull at the Tokyo 2020 Olympics to a bronze medal.

== School, club and state rowing ==
Letcher began rowing aged 13 at Radford College in the ACT and his senior rowing has been from the Black Mountain Rowing Club, Canberra.

He won a junior national title in a schoolboy coxed quad at the 2011 Australian Rowing Championships. He won the national U19 single and quad scull titles in 2012, while still at school and racing for Radford College, and national U23 titles in all three sculling boat classes at the 2015 Australian Rowing Championships now racing in Australian selection crews in Black Mountain RC colours. From 2014 to 2016 Letcher competed for the Australian National University Boat Club (where he was studying engineering) at the national university championships winning single and double sculls events in 2015 and 2016. He was the 2016 ANU Sports Star of the Year.

Letcher's first state selection for the Australian Capital Territory was in the 2015 men's eight competing for the King's Cup as well as the single scull for the President's Cup at the National Interstate Regatta. In 2016 and 2017 Letcher was again the ACT representative single sculler at the Interstate regatta. He took the silver medal in 2017.

In 2017 Letcher won the Australian quad scull championship rowing in a composite selection crew with Caleb Antill, Hamish Playfair and David Watts. In 2021 he again won an Australian championship title in the open men's quad scull.

== International representative rowing ==
Letcher made his Australian representative debut in the quad scull at the World Junior Rowing Championships in 2012. In 2014 he was selected as Australia's single sculler for the World Rowing U23 Championships in Varese. In 2015 he rowed with Thomas Schramko in a double scull at the World Rowing U23 Championships. In 2016 at the World Rowing U23 Championships in Rotterdam, Letcher rowed in the three seat to an U/23 World Championship gold medal in the quad scull with Thomas Schramko, Caleb Antill and Robert Black.

In 2017 Letcher was selected in Australia's senior squad and rowed a double scull with David Watts at two World Rowing Cups in Europe and then at the 2017 World Rowing Championships. In 2018 Letcher rowed in the Australian quad at two World Rowing Cups and in the single scull at the 2018 World Rowing Championships in Plovdiv Bulgaria.

In 2019 Letcher was selected in the Australian senior men's squad for the international representative season. At the WRC II in Poznan he rowed in a double scull with David Bartholot and World Rowing Cup III in Rotterdam he rowed at six in the Australian eight.

By the time of national team selections in 2021 for the delayed Tokyo Olympics, Letcher had forced his way into the Australian quad scull, which had qualified for the Olympics on 2019 performances. Letcher was selected to race that boat with Cameron Girdlestone, Caleb Antill and Jack Cleary in the other seats. This combination had won the Australian national title in the quad in 2021. In Tokyo the quad won their heat and progressed straight to the A final. They were behind the lead for much of the race but winds had blown up before the event and some crews struggled with their bladework in the chop. With Letcher in the stroke seat Australian quad kept their composure and technique and managed a bronze medal finish on the line.
