= Artem Zakharov (footballer) =

Ukrainian footballer

Personal information
- Full name: Artem Yuriyovych Zakharov
- Date of birth: 19 June 1996 (age 30)
- Place of birth: Zaporizhzhia, Ukraine
- Height: 1.85 m (6 ft 1 in)
- Position: Midfielder

Youth career
- 2009–2013: FC Metalurh Zaporizhzhia

Senior career*
| Years | Team | Apps | (Gls) |
| 2013–2015 | FC Metalurh Zaporizhzhia | ? | (?) |
- * Club domestic league appearances and goals as of 17 July 2015

Artem Zakharov (Ukrainian: Артем Юрійович Захаров; born 19 June 1996) is a Ukrainian football midfielder.

== Career ==
Zakharov is a product of the FC Metalurh Zaporizhzhia youth team system.

He made his debut for Metalurh Zaporizhzhia in the Ukrainian Premier League in the match against FC Zorya Luhansk on 17 July 2015.
