= Fabio Infimo =

Italian rower

Personal information
- Born: 18 July 1988 (age 37)

Sport
- Sport: Rowing

Fabio Infimo (born 18 July 1988) is an Italian rower. He competed in the men's eight event at the 2016 Summer Olympics.
