= Mateusz Biskup =

Polish rower (born 1994)

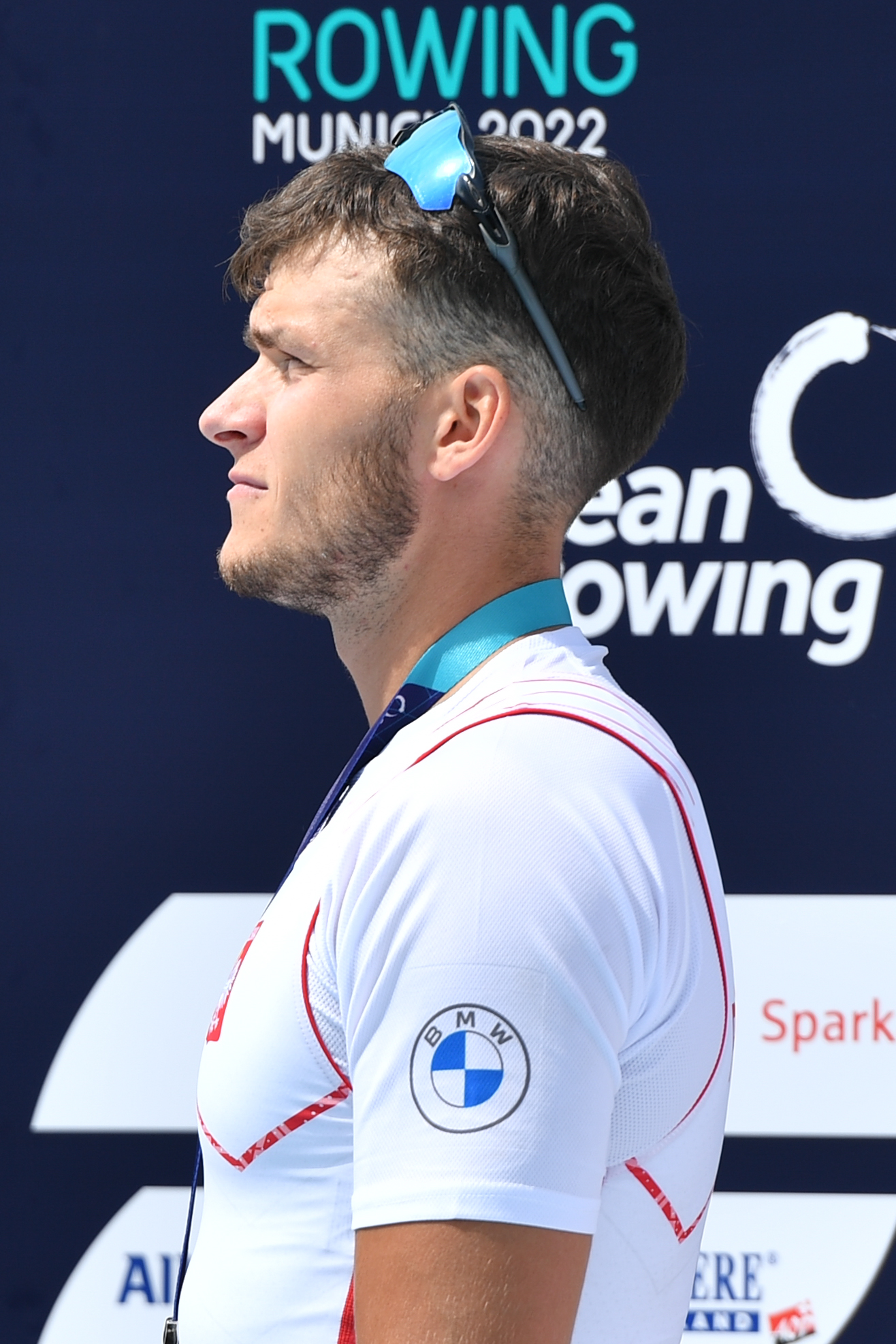
- Biskup in 2022

Personal information
- Nationality: Polish
- Born: 8 February 1994 (age 32) Gdańsk, Poland
- Height: 1.90 m (6 ft 3 in)
- Weight: 84 kg (185 lb)

Sport
- Country: Poland
- Sport: Rowing
- Events: Double sculls Quadruple sculls
- Club: AZS AWFiS Gdańsk
Medal record
Men's rowing
Representing Poland
Olympic Games
Bronze medal – third place	2024 Paris	Quadruple sculls
World Championships
Gold medal – first place	2022 Račice	Quadruple sculls
Gold medal – first place	2025 Shanghai	Double sculls
Silver medal – second place	2017 Sarasota	Double sculls
Bronze medal – third place	2019 Ottensheim	Double sculls
Bronze medal – third place	2023 Belgrade	Quadruple sculls
European Championships
Gold medal – first place	2023 Bled	Quadruple sculls
Gold medal – first place	2025 Plovdiv	Double sculls
Silver medal – second place	2017 Račice	Double sculls
Silver medal – second place	2022 Oberschleißheim	Quadruple sculls
Silver medal – second place	2026 Varese	Quadruple sculls
Bronze medal – third place	2024 Szeged	Quadruple sculls

Mateusz Biskup (born 8 February 1994) is a Polish rower. He competed at the 2016 and 2020 Summer Olympics, in the men's quadruple sculls and men's double sculls events, respectively.

He won a bronze medal in the quadruple sculls at the 2024 Summer Olympics.
