= Dzianis Mihal =

Belarusian rower (born 1985)

Personal information
- Born: 5 October 1985 (age 40)
Medal record
Men's rowing
Representing Belarus
European Championships
Silver medal – second place	2009 Brest	M4x
Silver medal – second place	2011 Plovdiv	M4-
Silver medal – second place	2016 Brandenburg	M4-
Bronze medal – third place	2007 Poznań	M4x
Bronze medal – third place	2015 Poznań	M4-

Dzianis Mihal (born 5 October 1985) is a Belarusian rower. He won the silver medal in the coxless four at the 2016 European Rowing Championships.
