= Hugo Boucheron =

French rower (born 1993)

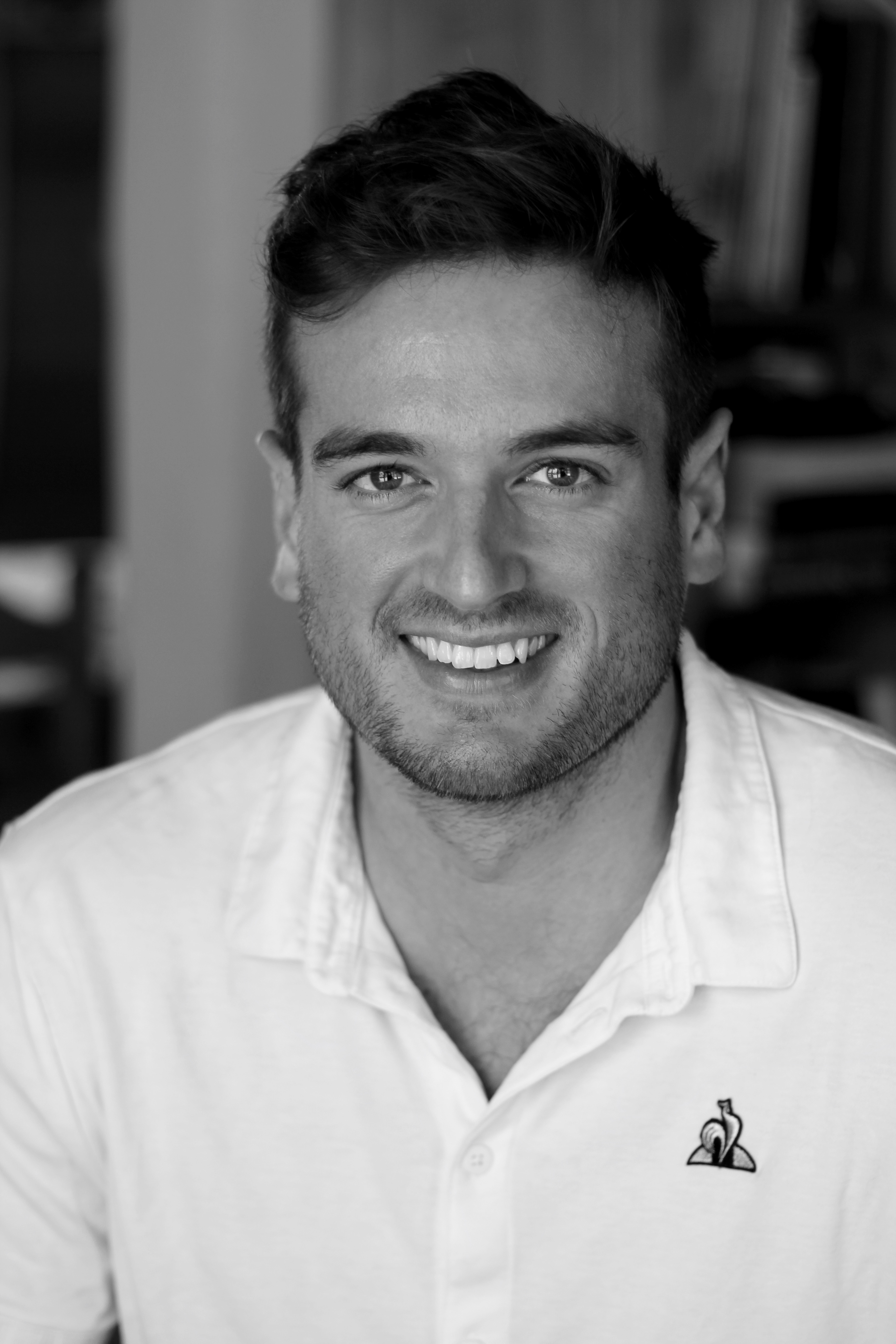
- Boucheron in 2018

Personal information
- Full name: Hugo Pascal Boucheron
- Born: 30 May 1993 (age 33) Lyon, France
- Height: 1.95 m (6 ft 5 in)
- Weight: 93 kg (205 lb)

Sport
- Country: France
- Sport: Rowing
- Club: Club Aviron Lyon Caluire
Medal record
Men's rowing
Representing France
Olympic Games
Gold medal – first place	2020 Tokyo	Double sculls
World Championships
Gold medal – first place	2018 Plovdiv	Double sculls
Gold medal – first place	2022 Račice	Double sculls
European Championships
Gold medal – first place	2018 Glasgow	Double sculls
Gold medal – first place	2021 Varese	Double sculls
Silver medal – second place	2015 Poznań	Double sculls
World Junior Championships
Silver medal – second place	2011 Dorney	Double sculls

Hugo Pascal Boucheron (born 30 May 1993) is a French representative rower, a dual Olympian and an Olympic and world champion. He won the double sculls event at the 2018 World Rowing Championships in Plovdiv. He competed in the men's double sculls at the 2016 Summer Olympics. Partnered with Matthieu Androdias he won the Olympic gold medal in the double scull at Tokyo 2020.
