= Ronan Byrne =

Irish rower (born 1998)

Personal information
- Nationality: Irish
- Born: 17 April 1998 (age 28) Cork, Ireland

Sport
- Country: Ireland
- Sport: Rowing
- Event: Double sculls
Medal record
Men's rowing
Representing Ireland
World Championships
Silver medal – second place	2019 Ottensheim	Double sculls
European Championships
Bronze medal – third place	2020 Poznan	Double sculls
World Rowing Coastal Championships
Silver medal – second place	2026 Qingdao	Double Sculls
Bronze medal – third place	2023 Barletta	Mixed Double Sculls

Ronan Byrne (born 17 April 1998) is an Irish national representative rower. He is an Olympian, was a silver medallist at the 2019 World Rowing Championships in the men's double scull and won a gold medal at the 2019 European Rowing U23 Championships in Ioannina. He raced the men's double scull with Philip Doyle at Tokyo Olympian. They finished fourth in the B final for an overall tenth place at the Olympic regatta.
