= Jüri-Mikk Udam =

Estonian rower

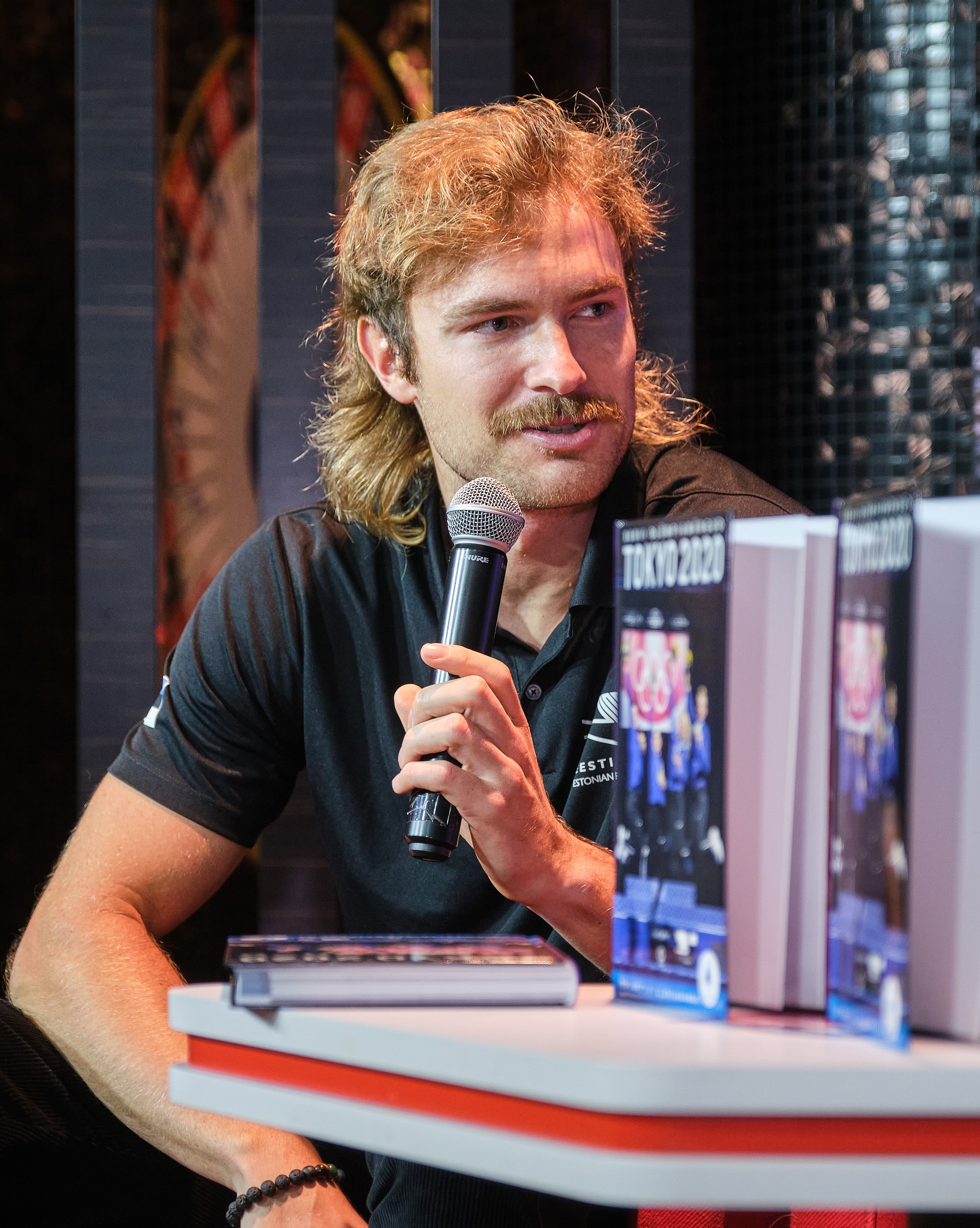
- Udam in 2021

Personal information
- Nationality: Estonian
- Born: 14 May 1994 (age 32) Tallinn, Estonia

Sport
- Sport: Rowing

Achievements and titles
- Olympic finals: Tokyo 2020 M4X

Jüri-Mikk Udam (born 14 May 1994) is an Estonian rower (double and quadruple sculls). He participated in the men's double sculls event at the 2012 Summer Olympics and the Tokyo 2020 olympics. He graduated from Harvard University in 2017.
