= Kristian Vasilev =

Bulgarian rower

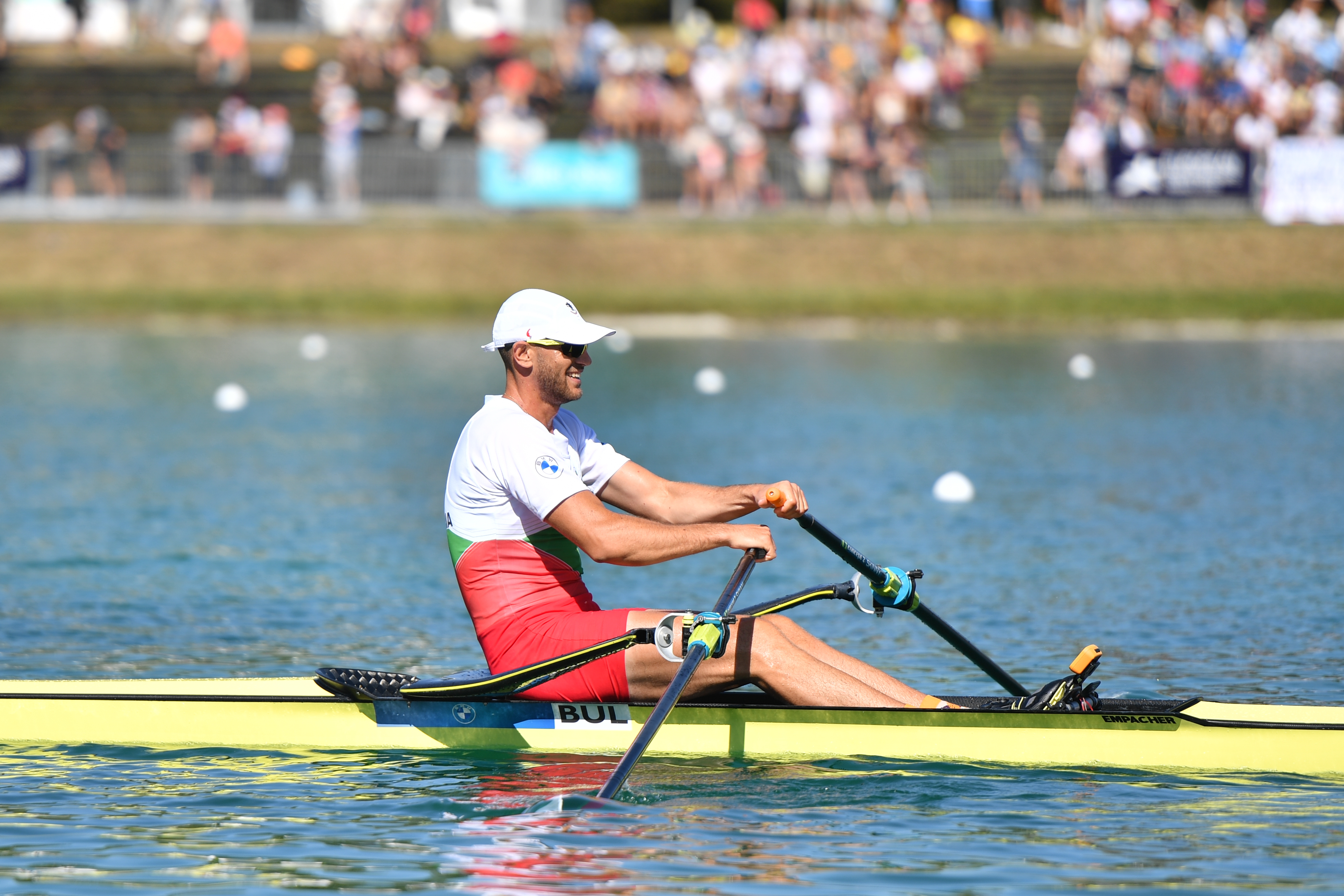

Personal information
- Born: 18 November 1991 (age 34) Plovdiv, Bulgaria

Sport
- Sport: Rowing
Medal record
Men's rowing
Representing Bulgaria
European Rowing Championships
Bronze medal – third place	2022 Munich	M1x

Kristian Vasilev (Bulgarian: Кристиан Василев) (born 18 November 1991) is a Bulgarian rower. He competed in the men's double sculls event at the 2016 Summer Olympics.
