= Matthieu Androdias =

French rower (born 1990)

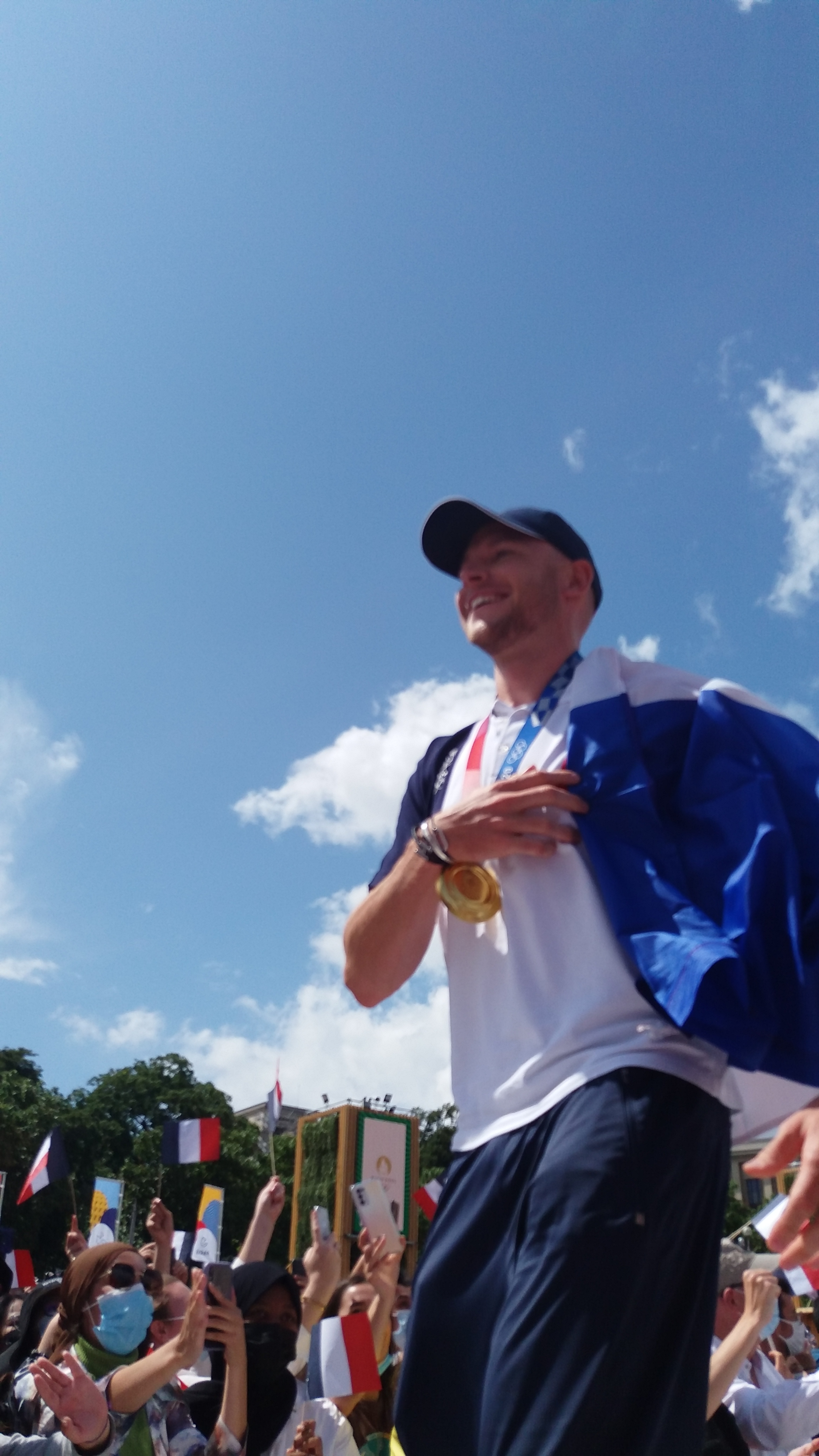
- Androdias in 2021

Personal information
- Full name: Matthieu Pierre Androdias
- Born: 11 June 1990 (age 36) La Rochelle, France
- Height: 1.94 m (6 ft 4 in)
- Weight: 94 kg (207 lb)

Sport
- Country: France
- Sport: Rowing
- Club: Club Aviron Lyon Caluire
Medal record
Men's rowing
Representing France
Olympic Games
Gold medal – first place	2020 Tokyo	Double sculls
World Championships
Gold medal – first place	2018 Plovdiv	Double sculls
Gold medal – first place	2022 Račice	Double sculls
European Championships
Gold medal – first place	2018 Glasgow	Double sculls
Gold medal – first place	2021 Varese	Double sculls
Silver medal – second place	2015 Poznań	Double sculls

Matthieu Pierre Androdias (born 11 June 1990) is a French representative rower. He is a three time Olympian, an Olympic champion and a dual world champion.

He competed in the men's quadruple sculls at the 2012 Summer Olympics and in the men's double scull at the 2016 Summer Olympics. Rowing with Hugo Boucheron he won the double sculls event at the 2018 World Championships in Plovdiv having earlier that year won the European title together. The duo had also previously come second at the 2015 European Championships. Still partnered with Boucheron in 2021, he won the Olympic gold medal in the double scull at Tokyo 2020.
