= Barnabé Delarze =

Swiss rower (born 1994)

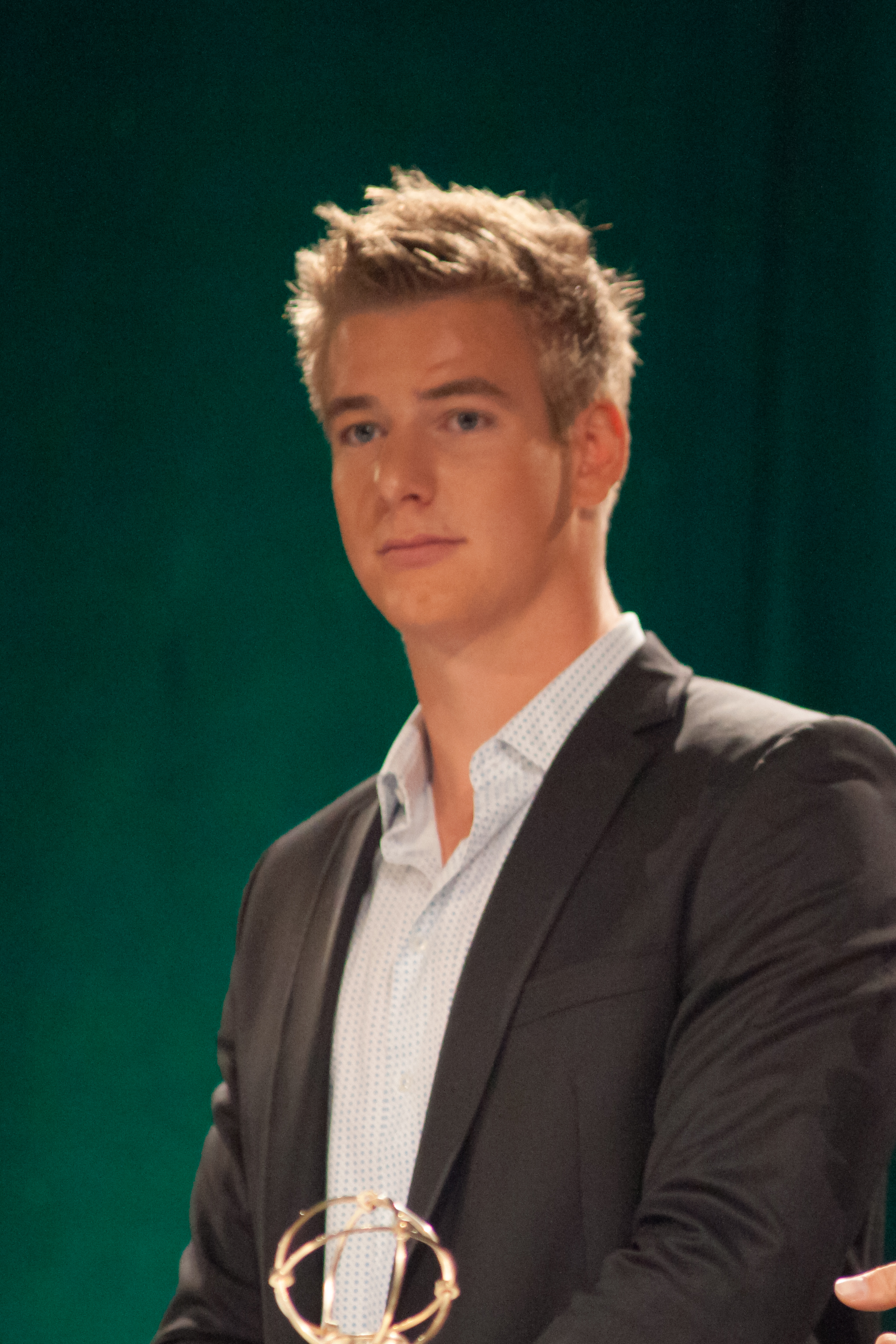
- Delarze in 2014

Personal information
- Born: 30 June 1994 (age 32)

Sport
- Sport: Rowing
Medal record
Men's rowing
Representing Switzerland
World Championships
Silver medal – second place	2018 Plovdiv	Double sculls
European Championships
Silver medal – second place	2019 Lucerne	Double sculls
Silver medal – second place	2020 Poznan	Double sculls
Bronze medal – third place	2017 Račice	Double sculls

Barnabé Delarze (born 30 June 1994) is a Swiss rower. He competed in the men's quadruple sculls event at the 2016 Summer Olympics and in the men's double sculls at the 2020 Summer Olympics.
