= Niki van Sprang =

Dutch rower (born 1993)

Personal information
- Born: 14 June 1993 (age 33) Berlin, Germany
- Height: 187 cm (6 ft 2 in)
- Weight: 86 kg (190 lb)

Sport
- Sport: Rowing
- Club: Roeivereniging Pampus
Medal record
Men's rowing
Representing the Netherlands
World Championships
Silver medal – second place	2022 Račice	Eight
European Championships
Silver medal – second place	2022 Munich	Eight
Bronze medal – third place	2023 Bled	Eight

Nicolas van Sprang (born 14 June 1993) is a Dutch rower. He competed in the men's coxless pair at the 2020 Summer Olympics. Rowing with Guillaume Krommenhoek, the pair finishing 7th overall, winning the B final.
