= Saulius Ritter =

Lithuanian rower (born 1988)

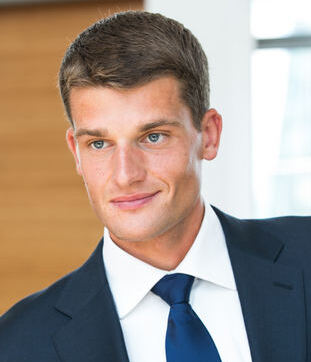
- Ritter in 2014

Personal information
- Born: 23 August 1988 (age 38) Vilnius, Lithuanian SSR, Soviet Union
Medal record
Men's rowing
Representing Lithuania
Olympic Games
Silver medal – second place	2016 Rio de Janeiro	Double sculls
World Championships
Silver medal – second place	2013 Chungju	M2x
Silver medal – second place	2015 Aiguebelette	M2x
European Championships
Gold medal – first place	2011 Plovdiv	M2x
Gold medal – first place	2014 Belgrade	M2x
Silver medal – second place	2013 Sevilla	M2x
Silver medal – second place	2018 Glasgow	M4x
Bronze medal – third place	2016 Brandenburg	M2x
World U23 Championships
Bronze medal – third place	2010 Brest	M2x
Summer Universiade
Gold medal – first place	2015 Gwangju	M2x

Saulius Ritter (born 23 August 1988) is a Lithuanian rower, best known for winning a silver medal at the 2016 Summer Olympics and a gold medal at the 2011 European Rowing Championships.

He competed at the 2012 Summer Olympics in the men's double sculls with Rolandas Maščinskas.

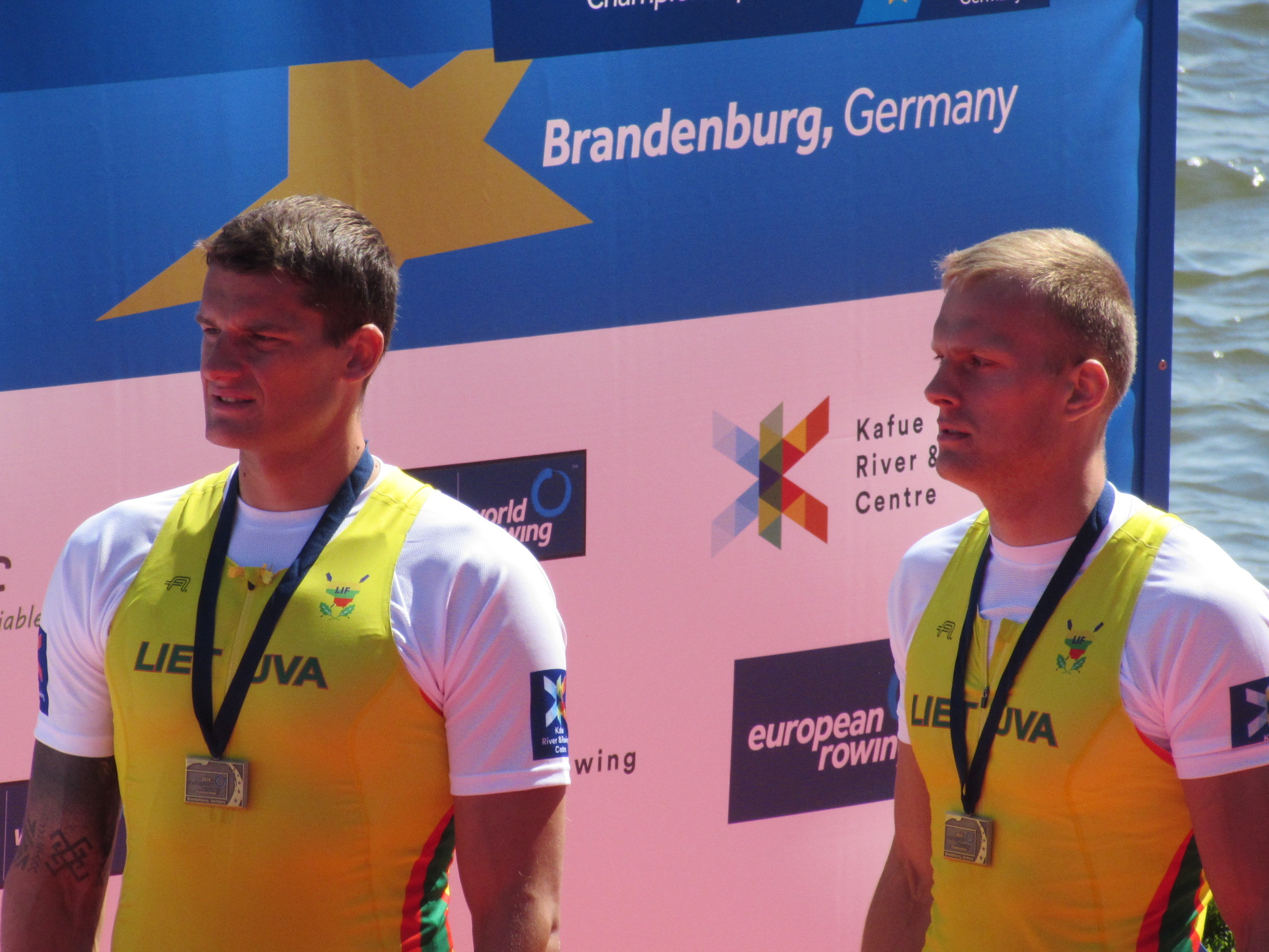
Saulius Ritter (left) and Rolandas Maščinskas at the 2016 European Championships in Brandenburg

Ritter and Maščinskas won gold at the 2011 and 2014 European Championships, silver at the 2013 and 2015 World Championships and the 2013 European Championships and bronze medal at the 2016 European Championships.

At the 2016 Summer Olympics, he won the silver medal in the same event with Mindaugas Griskonis.

In 2021 Ritter announced about retirement from professional sport.

== Biography ==
Currently living in Trakai. Studying in Mykolas Romeris University.

== Personal life ==
Ritter is engaged to another Lithuanian rower Milda Valčiukaitė.
