= Ioan Prundeanu =

Romanian rower

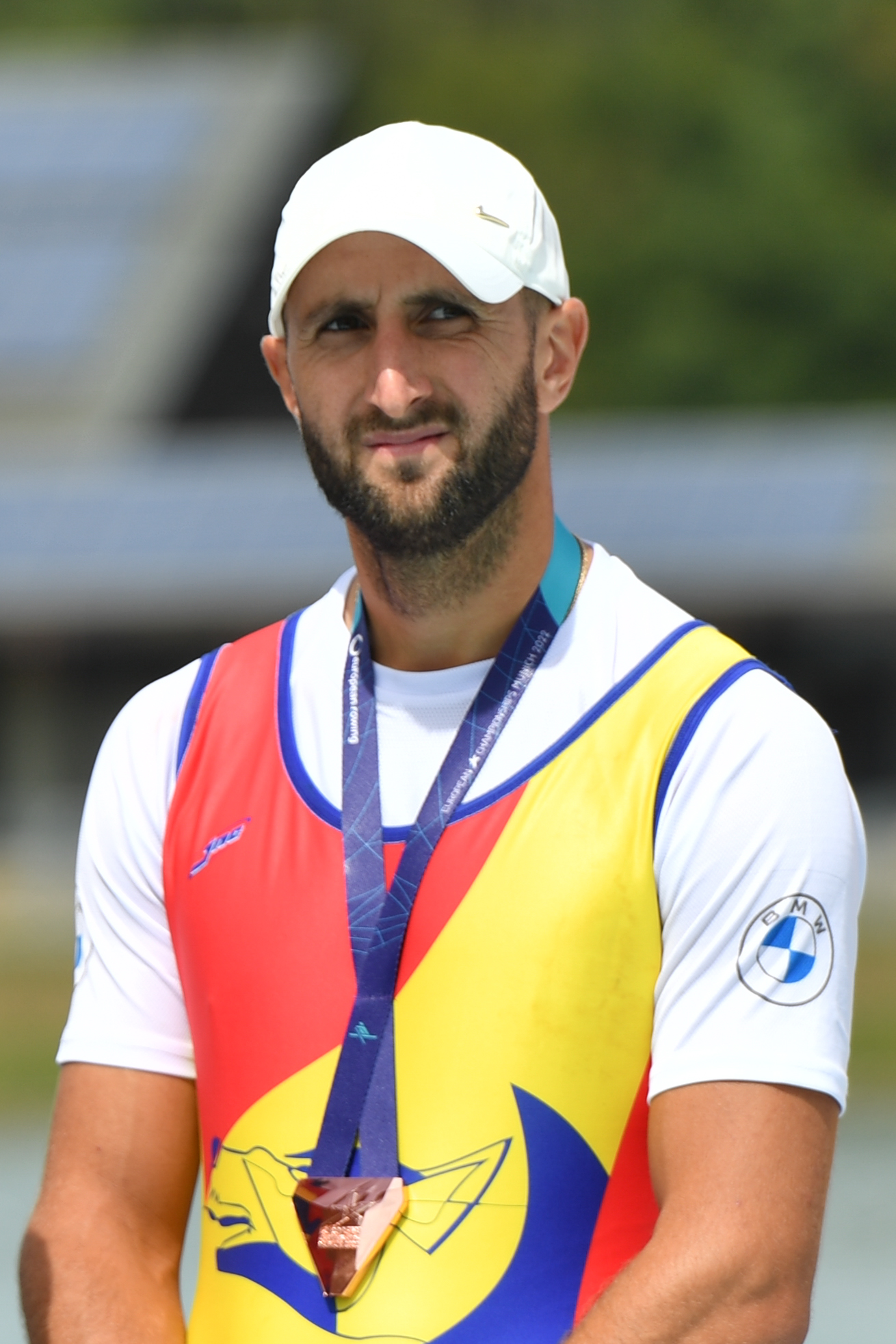

Personal information
- Nationality: Romania
- Born: 17 January 1993 (age 33)
- Height: 1.88 m (6 ft 2 in)

Sport
- Sport: Rowing
Medal record
Men's rowing
Representing Romania
World Junior Championships
Gold medal – first place	2011 Dorney	Quadruple sculls
European Championships
Silver medal – second place	2018 Glasgow	Double sculls
Bronze medal – third place	2019 Lucerna	Double sculls
Bronze medal – third place	2022 Munich	Quadruple sculls

Ioan Prundeanu (born 17 January 1993) is a Romanian rower. He competed in the 2020 Summer Olympics.
