= Marian Enache =

Romanian rower

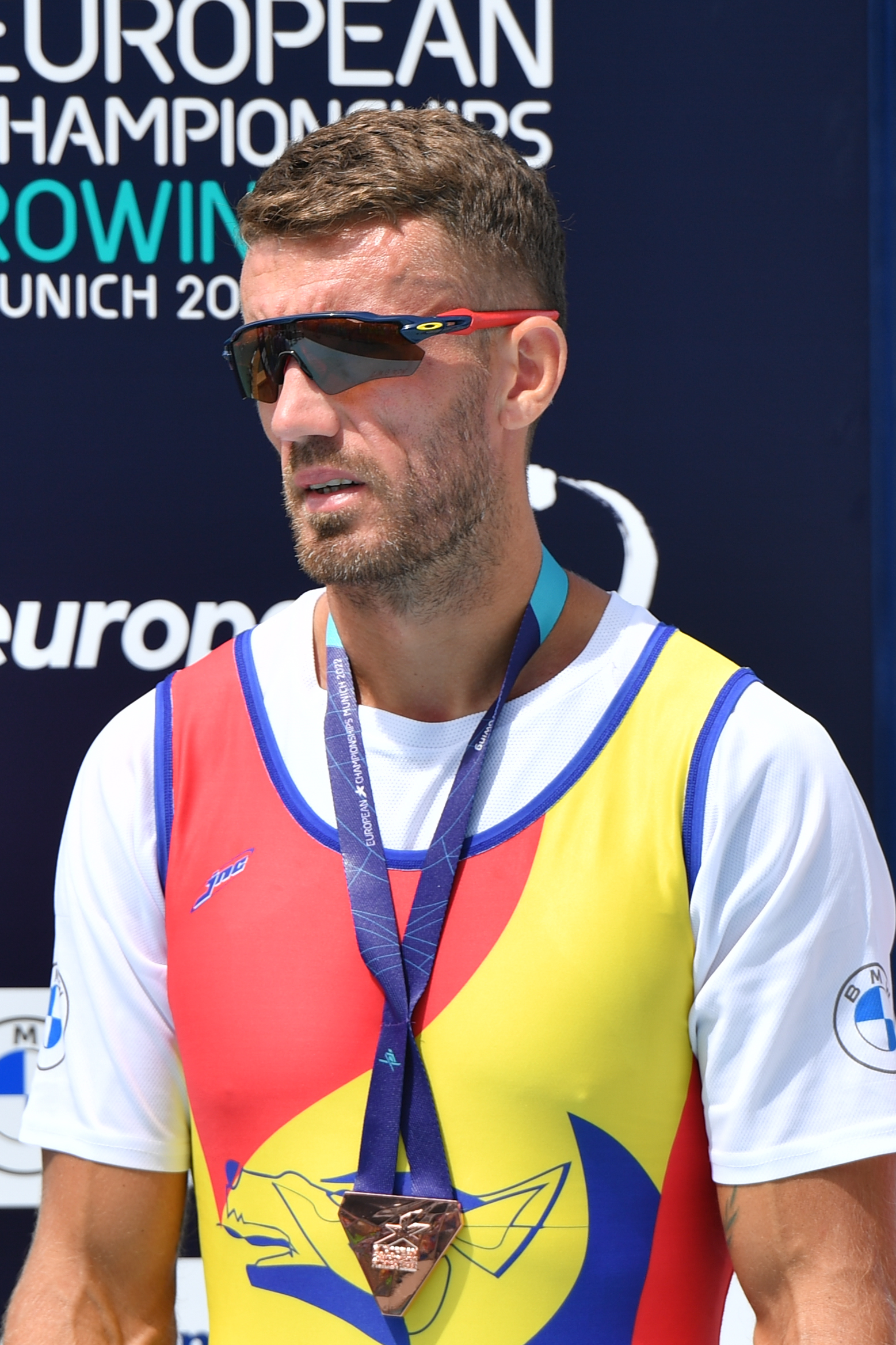
- Enache in 2022

Personal information
- Full name: Marian Florian Enache
- Nationality: Romania
- Born: 5 August 1995 (age 30) Târgu Cărbunești
- Height: 2.00 m (6 ft 7 in)

Sport
- Sport: Rowing
Medal record
Men's rowing
Representing Romania
Olympic Games
Gold medal – first place	2024 Paris	Double sculls
European Championships
Gold medal – first place	2024 Szeged	Double sculls}
Gold medal – first place	2026 Varese	Mixed double sculls
Silver medal – second place	2018 Glasgow	Double sculls
Bronze medal – third place	2019 Lucerna	Double sculls
Bronze medal – third place	2022 Oberschleißheim	Quadruple sculls
World Junior Championships
Silver medal – second place	2013 Trakai	Double sculls
Bronze medal – third place	2012 Plovdiv	Quadruple sculls

Marian Florian Enache (born 5 August 1995) is a Romanian rower. He won the gold medal at the 2024 Summer Olympics in the double sculls event with Andrei Cornea and is also a European champion.
