= Chris Harris (rower) =

New Zealand rower

Personal information
- Born: Christopher Harris; 19 October 1985 (age 40)
- Height: 1.86 m (6 ft 1 in)
- Weight: 89 kg (196 lb)
Medal record
Men's rowing
Representing New Zealand
World Championships
Gold medal – first place	2017 Sarasota	Double sculls
Bronze medal – third place	2015 Aiguebelette	Double sculls
Bronze medal – third place	2018 Plovdiv	Double sculls

Christopher Harris (born 19 October 1985) in Durban, South Africa is a New Zealand rower.

Harris started rowing while at Whanganui High School. He competed at the 2012 Olympics in the men's four, and the boat came fifth in the B final. He won a bronze medal at the 2015 World Rowing Championships. At the 2017 New Zealand rowing nationals at Lake Ruataniwha, he partnered with Robbie Manson in the men's double sculls and they became national champions. Harris announced his retirement from international rowing in September 2021.
