= Serbia at the 2016 Summer Olympics =

- IOC code: SRB
- NOC: Olympic Committee of Serbia
- Website: www.oks.org.rs (in Serbian)

in Rio de Janeiro
- Competitors: 103 in 14 sports
- Flag bearers: Ivana Anđušić Maksimović (opening); Tijana Bogdanović (closing)
- Medals Ranked 32nd: Gold 2 Silver 4 Bronze 2 Total 8

Summer Olympics appearances (overview)
- 1912; 1920–2004; 2008; 2012; 2016; 2020; 2024; 2028

Other related appearances
- Yugoslavia (1920–1992 W); Independent Olympic Participants (1992 S); Serbia and Montenegro (1996–2006)

Serbia competed at the 2016 Summer Olympics in Rio de Janeiro, Brazil, from 5 to 21 August 2016. It was the nation's fourth appearance at the Summer Olympics as an independent country. The Olympic Committee of Serbia confirmed a roster of 103 athletes, 58 men and 45 women, to compete across 14 sports at the Games.

Serbia left Rio de Janeiro with a total of 8 medals (2 gold, 4 silver, and 2 bronze), achieving the nation's most successful feat in Summer Olympic history since the break-up of Yugoslavia, and also doubling its previous medal tally from the 2012 Summer Olympics in London. 54 Serbian athletes (about 52 percent of the whole team) contributed to the medal count, with the majority of those coming in the signature team sports (men's water polo, men's and women's basketball, and women's volleyball).

Five Serbian athletes collected medals in individual sports. Among them were Greco-Roman wrestler Davor Štefanek, the first Serbian to win an Olympic gold in the sport after 32 years; long jumper Ivana Španović, the nation's first track and field athlete to stand on the Olympic podium in six decades; taekwondo fighter Tijana Bogdanović, who captured a silver in the women's flyweight category (49 kg); and kayak tandem Marko Tomićević and Milenko Zorić, who were runners-up in the long-distance double (men's K-2 1000 m).

== Medalists ==
Medal	Name	Sport	Event	Date
Gold	Davor Štefanek	Wrestling	Men's Greco-Roman 66 kg	16 August
Gold	Serbia men's national water polo team: Gojko Pijetlović; Dušan Mandić; Živko Gocić; Sava Ranđelović; Miloš Ćuk; Duško Pijetlović; Slobodan Nikić; Milan Aleksić; Nikola Jakšić; Filip Filipović; Andrija Prlainović; Stefan Mitrović; Branislav Mitrović	Water polo	Men's tournament	20 August
Silver	Tijana Bogdanović	Taekwondo	Women's 49 kg	17 August
Silver	Marko Tomićević; Milenko Zorić	Canoeing	Men's K-2 1000 metres	18 August
Silver	Serbia women's national volleyball team: Bianka Buša; Jovana Brakočević; Bojana Živković; Tijana Malešević; Brankica Mihajlović; Maja Ognjenović; Stefana Veljković; Jelena Nikolić; Jovana Stevanović; Milena Rašić; Silvija Popović; Tijana Bošković	Volleyball	Women's tournament	20 August
Silver	Serbia men's national basketball team: Miloš Teodosić; Marko Simonović; Bogdan Bogdanović; Stefan Marković; Nikola Kalinić; Nemanja Nedović; Stefan Birčević; Miroslav Raduljica; Nikola Jokić; Vladimir Štimac; Stefan Jović; Milan Mačvan	Basketball	Men's tournament	21 August
Bronze	Ivana Španović	Athletics	Women's long jump	17 August
Bronze	Serbia women's national basketball team: Tamara Radočaj; Sonja Petrović; Saša Čađo; Sara Krnjić; Nevena Jovanović; Jelena Milovanović; Dajana Butulija; Aleksandra Crvendakić; Dragana Stanković; Milica Dabović; Ana Dabović; Danielle Page	Basketball	Women's tournament	20 August

Medals by sport
Sport	1st place, gold medalist(s)	2nd place, silver medalist(s)	3rd place, bronze medalist(s)	Total
Water polo	1	0	0	1
Wrestling	1	0	0	1
Basketball	0	1	1	2
Canoeing	0	1	0	1
Taekwondo	0	1	0	1
Volleyball	0	1	0	1
Athletics	0	0	1	1
Total	2	4	2	8

Medals by day
Day	1st place, gold medalist(s)	2nd place, silver medalist(s)	3rd place, bronze medalist(s)	Total
16 August	1	0	0	1
17 August	0	1	1	2
18 August	0	1	0	1
20 August	1	1	1	3
21 August	0	1	0	1
Total	2	4	2	8

== Competitors ==
The Olympic Committee of Serbia fielded a team of 103 athletes, 58 men and 45 women, across fourteen sports at the Games. It was the nation's second-largest delegation sent to the Olympics, falling short of the record for the most number of athletes (116) achieved in London four years earlier by nearly 12 percent. Serbia qualified teams in men's water polo and women's volleyball, as well as both the men's and women's basketball for the first time in its Olympic history.

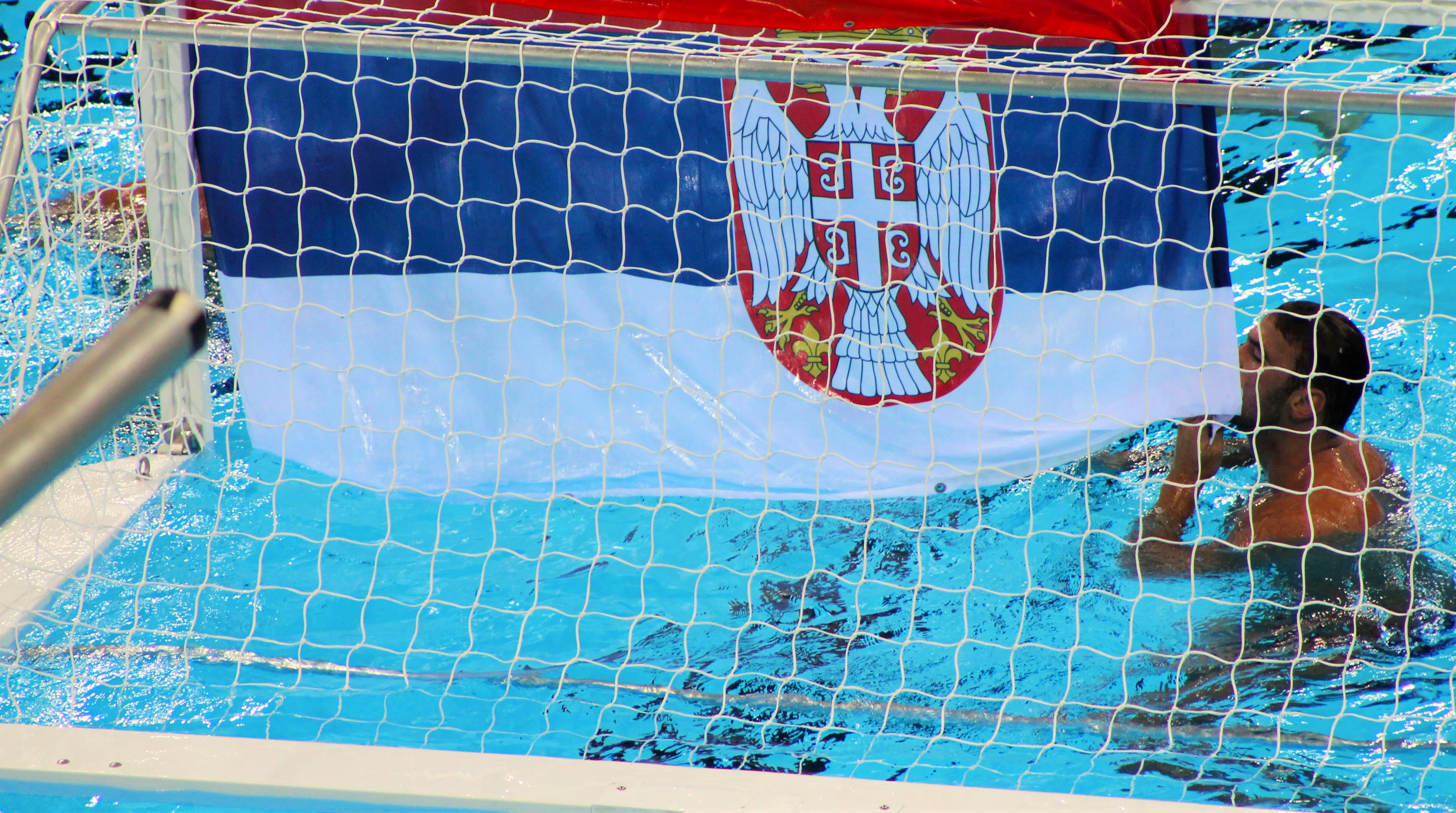
After the Rio Olympics, Serbia men's national water polo team held Olympic Games, World Championship, European Championship, World Cup and World League titles simultaneously

Traditional collective sports accounted for nearly half of the nation's roster, amassing a combined total of 49 athletes. By individual-based sport, however, track and field constituted the largest percentage of athletes on the Serbian team, with 12 entries. There was a single competitor each in road cycling, mountain biking, judo, and table tennis.

Highlighting the list of Serbian athletes were Beijing 2008 bronze medalist Novak Djokovic, who entered the Games as the world's top-ranked tennis player in the men's singles, and taekwondo fighter Milica Mandić, who became the country's first ever Olympic champion in London four years earlier. Rifle shooting legend Stevan Pletikosić, who officially made his sixth Olympic appearance, topped the nation's roster lineup as the oldest and most experienced competitor (aged 43). Meanwhile, Pletikosic's female counterpart Ivana Anđušić Maksimović, who followed her father Goran's sporting legacy to win a silver medal in the small-bore rifle at London 2012, acted as the flag bearer for the Serbian team in the opening ceremony.

Other notable athletes on the Serbian roster included long jumper and European outdoor champion Ivana Španović, pistol shooters Zorana Arunović (European Games gold medalist) and Andrea Arsović (European champion and world's top-ranked), freestyle swimmer and London 2012 finalist Velimir Stjepanović, water polo team captain Živko Gocić, and basketballers Miloš Teodosić (team captain and EuroLeague champion), Nikola Jokić (who currently played for NBA's Denver Nuggets) and Ana Dabović (WNBA's Los Angeles Sparks and EuroBasket MVP).

The following is the list of number of competitors participating in the Games:

Sport	Men	Women	Total
Athletics	7	5	12
Basketball	12	12	24
Canoeing	6	4	10
Cycling	1	1	2
Judo	1	0	1
Rowing	4	0	4
Shooting	5	4	9
Swimming	2	2	4
Table tennis	1	0	1
Taekwondo	0	2	2
Tennis	3	3	6
Volleyball	0	12	12
Water polo	13	0	13
Wrestling	3	0	3
Total	58	45	103

== Athletics ==
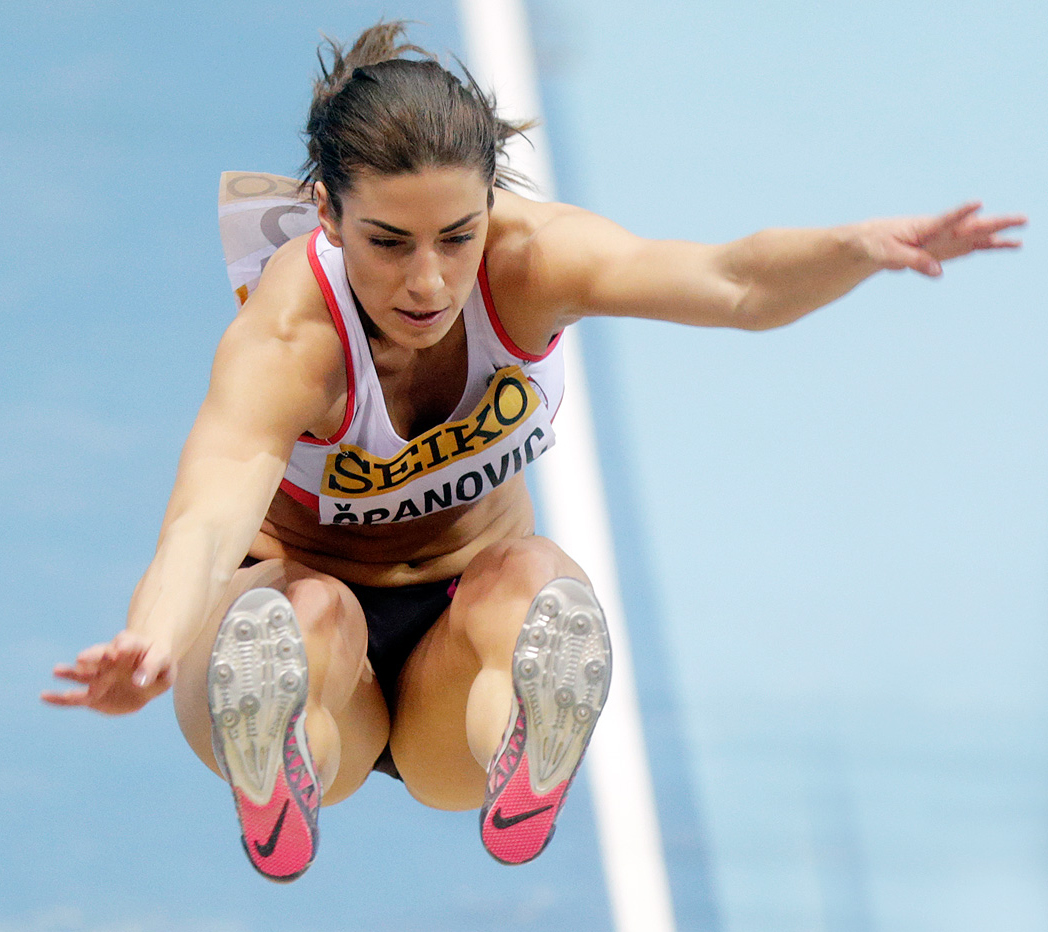
Ivana Španović won first Olympic medal in athletics for Serbia

Serbian athletes have so far achieved qualifying standards in the following athletics events (up to a maximum of 3 athletes in each event):

Key

- Note–Ranks given for track events are within the athlete's heat only
- Q = Qualified for the next round
- q = Qualified for the next round as a fastest loser or, in field events, by position without achieving the qualifying target
- NR = National record
- N/A = Round not applicable for the event
- Bye = Athlete not required to compete in round

Track & road events
Men

Athlete	Event	Heat		Semifinal		Final	
Athlete	Event	Result	Rank	Result	Rank	Result	Rank
Milan Ristić	110 m hurdles	13.66	6	Did not advance			
Anđelko Rističević	Marathon	—N/a				2:30:17	119
Nenad Filipović	50 km walk	—N/a				4:25:41	46
Predrag Filipović	50 km walk	—N/a				4:39:48	49
Vladimir Savanović	50 km walk	—N/a				4:15:53	42

Women

Athlete	Event	Heat		Semifinal		Final	
Athlete	Event	Result	Rank	Result	Rank	Result	Rank
Tamara Salaški	400 m	52.70	3	Did not advance			
Amela Terzić	800 m	2:00.99	2 Q	2:03.81	7	Did not advance	
Amela Terzić	1500 m	4:15.17	10	Did not advance			
Olivera Jevtić	Marathon	—N/a				DNF	

Field events

Athlete	Event	Qualification		Final	
Athlete	Event	Distance	Position	Distance	Position
Asmir Kolašinac	Men's shot put	20.16	15	Did not advance	
Ivana Španović	Women's long jump	6.87	1 Q	7.08 NR	3rd place, bronze medalist(s)
Dragana Tomašević	Women's discus throw	57.67	19	Did not advance	

Combined events – Men's decathlon

Athlete	Event	100 m	LJ	SP	HJ	400 m	110H	DT	PV	JT	1500 m	Final	Rank
Mihail Dudaš	Result	10.83	7.29	14.23	2.04	49.13	14.65	43.27	4.60	DNS	—	DNF	
Mihail Dudaš	Points	899	883	742	840	855	892	731	790	—	—	DNF	

== Basketball ==
=== Men's tournament ===
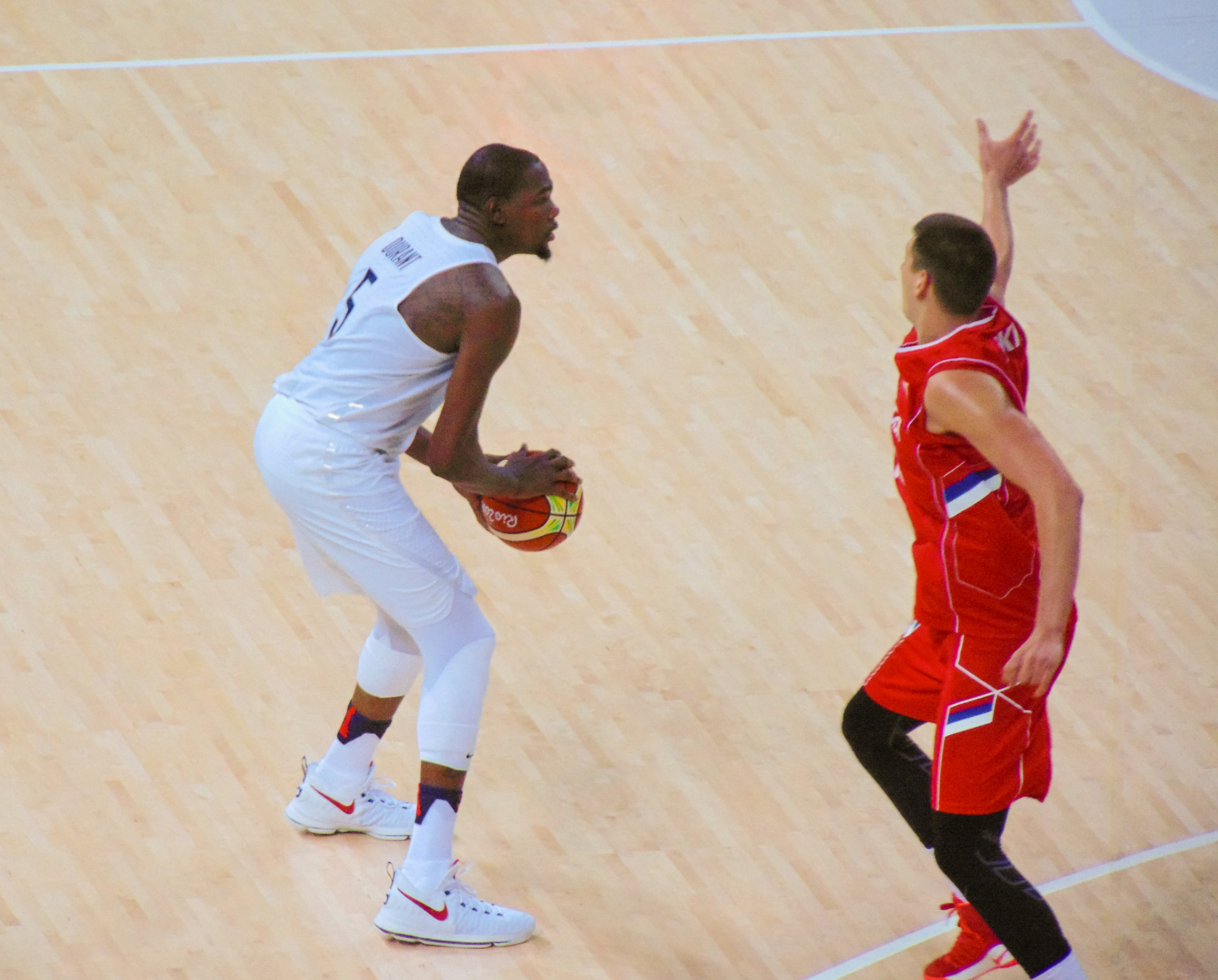
Nikola Jokić with Kevin Durant in the group stage game United States

Serbia men's basketball team qualified for the Olympics by securing its lone outright berth and winning the final match over Puerto Rico at the Belgrade leg of the 2016 FIBA World Qualifying Tournament, signifying the nation's debut in the sport since it gained independence from Montenegro in 2006.

Team roster

The following is the Serbia roster in the men's basketball tournament of the 2016 Summer Olympics

Serbia men's national basketball team – 2016 Summer Olympics roster
Players
Coaches

Pos.	No.	Name	Age – Date of birth	Height	Club	Ctr.
PG	4	Miloš Teodosić (C)	29 – March 19, 1987	1.95 m (6 ft 5 in)	CSKA Moscow	(Russia)
SF	5	Marko Simonović	30 – May 30, 1986	2.01 m (6 ft 7 in)	Crvena Zvezda	(Serbia)
SG	7	Bogdan Bogdanović	23 – August 18, 1992	1.98 m (6 ft 6 in)	Fenerbahce	(Turkey)
PG	9	Stefan Marković	28 – April 25, 1988	1.95 m (6 ft 5 in)	Baloncesto Málaga	(Spain)
SF	10	Nikola Kalinić	24 – November 8, 1991	2.02 m (6 ft 8 in)	Fenerbahce	(Turkey)
G	11	Nemanja Nedović	25 – June 16, 1991	1.92 m (6 ft 4 in)	Baloncesto Málaga	(Spain)
PF	12	Stefan Birčević	26 – December 13, 1989	2.10 m (6 ft 11 in)	Estudiantes	(Spain)
C	13	Miroslav Raduljica	28 – January 5, 1988	2.13 m (7 ft 0 in)	Panathinaikos	(Greece)
C	14	Nikola Jokić	21 – February 19, 1995	2.08 m (6 ft 10 in)	Denver Nuggets	(United States)
C	15	Vladimir Štimac	28 – September 25, 1987	2.11 m (6 ft 11 in)	Crvena Zvezda	(Serbia)
PG	24	Stefan Jović	25 – November 3, 1990	1.98 m (6 ft 6 in)	Crvena Zvezda	(Serbia)
PF	25	Milan Mačvan	26 – November 16, 1989	2.06 m (6 ft 9 in)	Emporio Armani	(Italy)

Head coach

- (Serbia) Aleksandar Đorđević

Assistant coach(es)

- (Serbia) Miroslav Nikolić
- (Serbia) Jovica Antonić
- (Serbia) Milan Minić

Conditioning trainer

- (Serbia) Mladen Mihajlović

Legend

- (C) Team captain
- Club – describes last
  club before the tournament
- Age – describes age
  on 6 August 2016

Group play

Pos	Team	Pld	W	L	PF	PA	PD	Pts	Qualification
1	United States	5	5	0	524	407	+117	10	Quarterfinals
2	Australia	5	4	1	444	368	+76	9	Quarterfinals
3	France	5	3	2	423	378	+45	8	Quarterfinals
4	Serbia	5	2	3	426	387	+39	7	Quarterfinals
5	Venezuela	5	1	4	315	444	−129	6	
6	China	5	0	5	318	466	−148	5	

Source: FIBA
Rules for classification: 1) points; 2) head-to-head points; 3) head-to-head points difference; 4) head-to-head number of points scored.

6 August 2016
22:30

Boxscore

Venezuela	62–86	Serbia
Scoring by quarter: 14–18, 9–26, 18–24, 21–18
Pts: Echenique 12; Rebs: Colmenares 6 Asts: Vargas 5		Pts: Bogdanović 19; Rebs: Štimac 9 Asts: Nedović 4

Carioca Arena 1, Rio de Janeiro
Attendance: 5,063
Referees: Christos Christodoulou (GRE), Duan Zhu (CHN), Roberto Vázquez (PUR)

8 August 2016
14:15

Boxscore

Serbia	80–95	Australia
Scoring by quarter: 23–26, 20–14, 20–22, 17–33
Pts: Raduljica 25; Rebs: Bogdanović 8 Asts: Marković 4		Pts: Mills 26; Rebs: Bogut 12; Asts: Dellavedova 13

Carioca Arena 1, Rio de Janeiro
Attendance: 5,409
Referees: Cristiano Maranho (BRA), Borys Ryzhyk (UKR), Guilherme Locatelli (BRA)

10 August 2016
14:15

Boxscore

Serbia	75–76	France
Scoring by quarter: 17–26, 19–14, 24–17, 15–19
Pts: Raduljica 16; Rebs: Jokić 7 Asts: Teodosić 9		Pts: de Colo 22; Rebs: Diaw 9 Asts: Diaw 9

Carioca Arena 1, Rio de Janeiro
Attendance: 6,901
Referees: Borys Ryzhyk (UKR), Stephen Seibel (CAN), Oļegs Latiševs (LAT)

12 August 2016
19:00

Boxscore

United States	94–91	Serbia
Scoring by quarter: 27–15, 23–26, 22–21, 22–29
Pts: Irving 15; Rebs: George 9 Asts: Irving, Cousins 5		Pts: Jokić 25; Rebs: Jokić 6 Asts: Teodosić 6

Carioca Arena 1, Rio de Janeiro
Attendance: 11,413
Referees: Stephen Seibel (CAN), Guilherme Locatelli (BRA), Piotr Pastusiak (POL)

14 August 2016
22:30

Boxscore

Serbia	94–60	China
Scoring by quarter: 24–18, 19–10, 35–15, 16–17
Pts: Bogdanović 19; Rebs: Jokić 7 Asts: Marković, Teodosić 5		Pts: Yi 20; Rebs: Wang 8 Asts: Ailun 8

Carioca Arena 1, Rio de Janeiro
Attendance: 7,367
Referees: Juan García (ESP), Guilherme Locatelli (BRA), Anne Panther (GER)

Quarterfinal

17 August 2016
22:15

Boxscore

Croatia	83–86	Serbia
Scoring by quarter: 19–20, 19–12, 14–34, 31–20
Pts: Bogdanović 28; Rebs: Planinić 9 Asts: Simon 5		Pts: Bogdanović 18; Rebs: three players 4 Asts: Teodosić 10

Carioca Arena 1, Rio de Janeiro
Attendance: 9,027
Referees: Juan García (ESP), Borys Ryzhyk (UKR), Roberto Vázquez (PUR)

Semifinal

19 August 2016
19:00

Boxscore

Australia	61–87	Serbia
Scoring by quarter: 5–16, 9–19, 24–31, 23–21
Pts: Mills, Motum 13; Rebs: Baynes 8 Asts: Broekhoff 4		Pts: Teodosić 22; Rebs: Jokić 11; Asts: Teodosić 5

Carioca Arena 1, Rio de Janeiro
Attendance: 9,655
Referees: Stephen Seibel (CAN), Robert Lottermoser (GER), Oļegs Latiševs (LAT)

Gold medal match

21 August 2016
15:45

Boxscore

Serbia	66–96	United States
Scoring by quarter: 15–19, 14–33, 14–27, 23–17
Pts: Nedović 14; Rebs: Jokić 4 Asts: three players 3		Pts: Durant 30; Rebs: Cousins 15; Asts: Lowry 5

Carioca Arena 1, Rio de Janeiro
Attendance: 10,658
Referees: José Reyes (MEX), Borys Ryzhyk (UKR), Juan García (SPA)

=== Women's tournament ===
The Serbian women's basketball team qualified for the Olympics by winning the EuroBasket Women 2015 in Hungary.

Team roster

The following is the Serbia roster in the women's basketball tournament of the 2016 Summer Olympics.

Serbia women's national basketball team – 2016 Summer Olympics roster
Players
Coaches

Pos.	No.	Name	Age – Date of birth	Height	Club
G	4	Tamara Radočaj	28 – 23 December 1987	1.70 m (5 ft 7 in)	UNI Győr	(Hungary)
F	5	Sonja Petrović	27 – 18 February 1989	1.89 m (6 ft 2 in)	Phoenix Mercury	(United States)
G	6	Saša Čađo	27 – 13 July 1989	1.78 m (5 ft 10 in)	İstanbul Üniversitesi SK	(Turkey)
C	7	Sara Krnjić	25 – 15 July 1991	1.93 m (6 ft 4 in)	UNIQA Sopron	(Hungary)
G	8	Nevena Jovanović	26 – 30 June 1990	1.79 m (5 ft 10 in)	PEAC-Pécs	(Hungary)
F	9	Jelena Milovanović	27 – 28 April 1989	1.90 m (6 ft 3 in)	Perfumerías Avenida	(Spain)
G	10	Dajana Butulija	30 – 23 February 1986	1.75 m (5 ft 9 in)	Lyon Basket	(France)
PF	11	Aleksandra Crvendakić	20 – 17 March 1996	1.87 m (6 ft 2 in)	UNIQA Sopron	(Hungary)
C	12	Dragana Stanković	21 – 18 January 1995	1.95 m (6 ft 5 in)	PEAC-Pécs	(Hungary)
G	13	Milica Dabović (C)	34 – 16 February 1982	1.70 m (5 ft 7 in)	Lyon Basket	(France)
G	14	Ana Dabović	26 – 18 August 1989	1.83 m (6 ft 0 in)	Los Angeles Sparks	(United States)
F	15	Danielle Page	29 – 14 November 1986	1.88 m (6 ft 2 in)	CJM Bourges Basket	(France)

Head coach

- (Serbia) Marina Maljković

Assistant coach(es)

- (Serbia) Bojan Janković
- (Serbia) Miloš Pađen
- (Serbia) Dragan Ratković

Legend

- (C) Team captain
- Club – describes last
  club before the tournament
- Age – describes age
  on 6 August 2016

Group play

Pos	Team	Pld	W	L	PF	PA	PD	Pts	Qualification
1	United States	5	5	0	520	316	+204	10	Quarter-finals
2	Spain	5	4	1	387	333	+54	9	Quarter-finals
3	Canada	5	3	2	340	347	−7	8	Quarter-finals
4	Serbia	5	2	3	385	406	−21	7	Quarter-finals
5	China	5	1	4	371	428	−57	6	
6	Senegal	5	0	5	309	482	−173	5	

Source: FIBA
Rules for classification: 1) points; 2) head-to-head points; 3) head-to-head points difference; 4) head-to-head number of points scored.

7 August 2016
14:15

Boxscore

Serbia	59–65	Spain
Scoring by quarter: 18–19, 13–12, 13–15, 15–19
Pts: Milovanović 17; Rebs: Petrović 8 Asts: A. Dabović 4		Pts: Xargay 15; Rebs: Ndour 12; Asts: Palau, Torrens 5

Youth Arena, Rio de Janeiro
Attendance: 2,654
Referees: Roberto Vázquez (PUR), Natalia Cuello (DOM), Piotr Pastusiak (POL)

8 August 2016
14:15

Boxscore

Canada	71–67	Serbia
Scoring by quarter: 21–21, 11–19, 13–17, 26–10
Pts: Nurse 25; Rebs: Raincock-Ekunwe 9 Asts: Langolis, Nurse 5		Pts: Milovanović 19; Rebs: Page 6 Asts: A. Dabović 5

Youth Arena, Rio de Janeiro
Attendance: 2,377
Referees: Robert Lottermoser (GER), Vaughan Mayberry (AUS), Hwang In-tae (KOR)

10 August 2016
15:30

Boxscore

United States	110–84	Serbia
Scoring by quarter: 31–21, 25–13, 28–27, 26–23
Pts: Taurasi 25; Rebs: Charles 8 Asts: Taurasi 6		Pts: three players 15; Rebs: A. Dabović 5 Asts: A. Dabović, M. Dabović 4

Youth Arena, Rio de Janeiro
Attendance: 2,490
Referees: Piotr Pastusiak (POL), Scott Beker (AUS), Nadege Zouzou (CIV)

12 August 2016
12:15

Boxscore

Serbia	80–72	China
Scoring by quarter: 24–14, 16–20, 26–9, 14–29
Pts: A. Dabović 23; Rebs: Page, Petrović 8 Asts: Petrović 6		Pts: Sun Mengr. 16; Rebs: Huang, Sun Mengr. 7 Asts: three players 3

Youth Arena, Rio de Janeiro
Attendance: 2,219
Referees: Christos Christodoulou (GRE), Natalia Cuello (DOM), Nadege Zouzou (CIV)

14 August 2016
15:30

Boxscore

Senegal	88–95	Serbia
Scoring by quarter: 15–27, 28–28, 23–21, 22–19
Pts: As. Traoré 30; Rebs: As. Traoré 8 Asts: Diouf 8		Pts: Petrović 20; Rebs: Page 8 Asts: A. Dabović 8

Youth Arena, Rio de Janeiro
Attendance: 3,113
Referees: Eddie Viator (FRA), Piotr Pastusiak (POL), Hwang In-tae (KOR)

Quarterfinal

16 August 2016
11:00

Boxscore

Australia	71–73	Serbia
Scoring by quarter: 20–20, 17–15, 15–16, 19–22
Pts: Cambage 29; Rebs: Cambage 11; Asts: Taylor 9		Pts: A. Dabović 24; Rebs: four players 4 Asts: Petrović 5

Carioca Arena 1, Rio de Janeiro
Attendance: 5,630
Referees: Eddie Viator (FRA), Karen Lasuik (CAN), Natalia Cuello (DOM)

Semifinal

18 August 2016
15:00

Boxscore

Spain	68–54	Serbia
Scoring by quarter: 20–9, 13–19, 20–10, 15–16
Pts: Ndour, Torrens 14; Rebs: Nicholls 12; Asts: Palau 7		Pts: Čađo, Petrović 12; Rebs: Page, Petrović 7 Asts: Butulija 3

Carioca Arena 1, Rio de Janeiro
Attendance: 8,818
Referees: Damir Javor (SLO), Scott Beker (AUS), Anne Panther (GER)

Bronze medal match

20 August 2016
11:30

Boxscore

France	63–70	Serbia (bronze)
Scoring by quarter: 10–18, 17–9, 15–28, 21–15
Pts: Miyem 18; Rebs: Yacoubou 10; Asts: Époupa 4		Pts: Milovanović 18; Rebs: Page 8 Asts: A. Dabović 5

Carioca Arena 1, Rio de Janeiro
Attendance: 9,039
Referees: Carlos Peruga (ESP), Anne Panther (GER), Natalia Cuello (DOM)

== Canoeing ==
=== Sprint ===
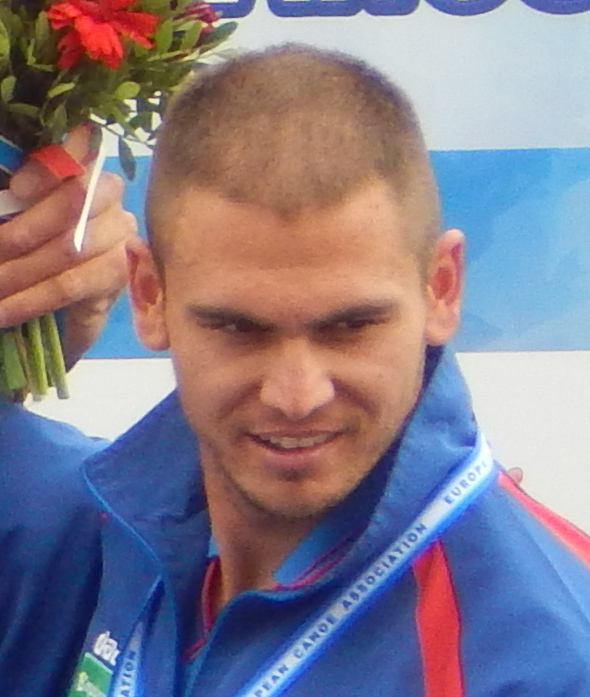
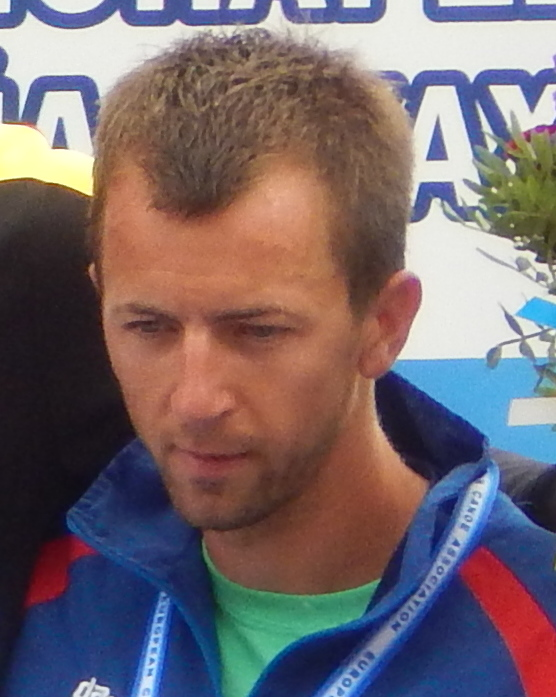
Marko Tomićević and Milenko Zorić won silver medal in the men's K-2 1000 m event.

Serbian canoeists have qualified one boat in each of the following events through the 2015 ICF Canoe Sprint World Championships.

Men

Athlete	Event	Heats		Semifinals		Final	
Athlete	Event	Time	Rank	Time	Rank	Time	Rank
Marko Novaković	K-1 200 m	34.938	3 Q	34.778	5 FB	37.415	13
Dejan Pajić	K-1 1000 m	3:36.884	4 Q	3:48.158	8 FB	3:40.502	15
Nebojša Grujić; Marko Novaković	K-2 200 m	31.776	2 Q	32.513	3 FA	32.656	6
Marko Tomićević; Milenko Zorić	K-2 1000 m	3:15.298	1 FA	Bye		3:10.969	2nd place, silver medalist(s)
Marko Tomićević; Milenko Zorić; Dejan Pajić; Vladimir Torubarov	K-4 1000 m	3:05.272	6 Q	2:59.636	3 FA	3:10.241	8

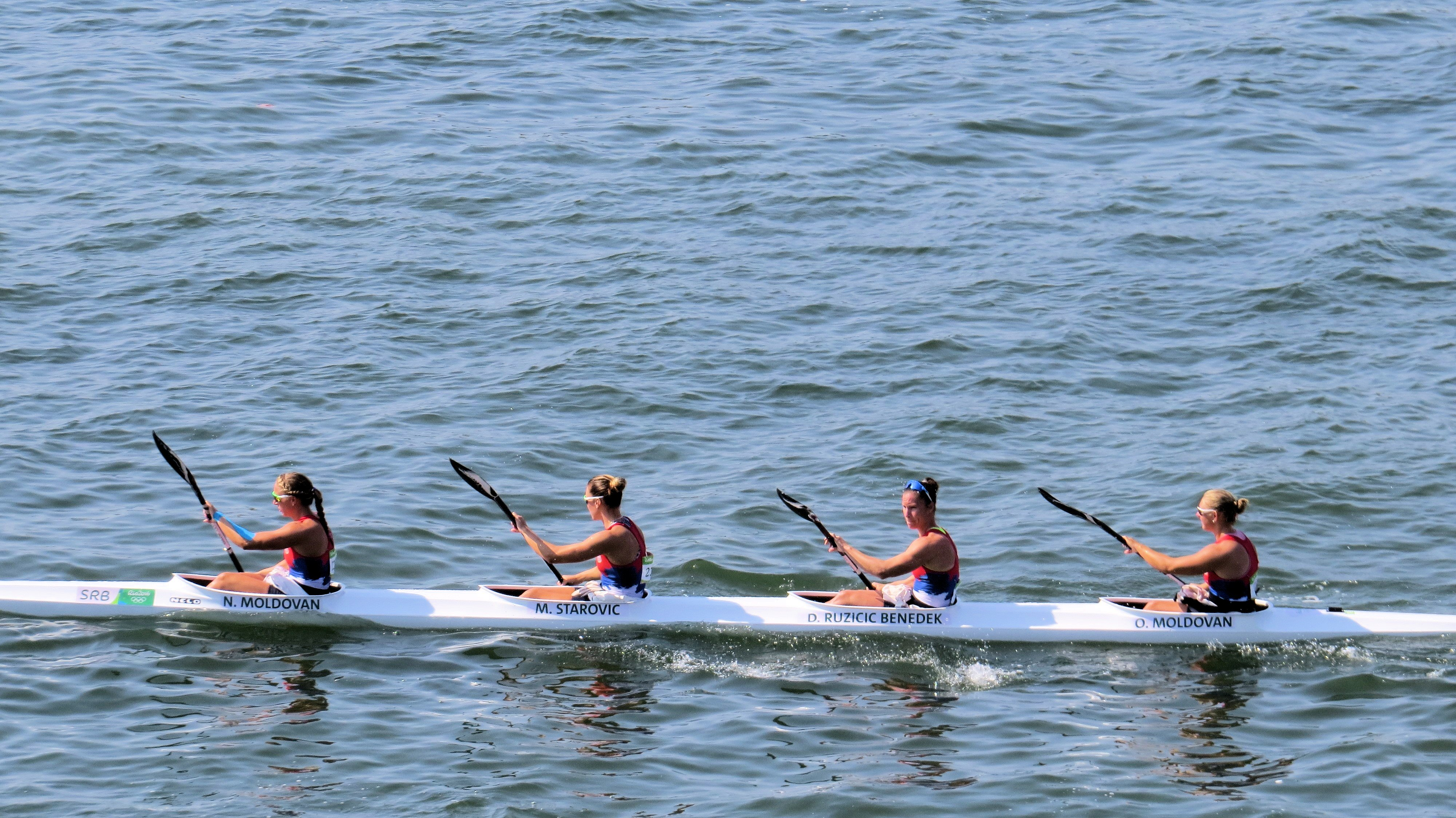
Serbian team during the women's K-4 500 metres event.

Women

Athlete	Event	Heats		Semifinals		Final	
Athlete	Event	Time	Rank	Time	Rank	Time	Rank
Olivera Moldovan	K-1 200 m	43.339	5 Q	42.123	7	Did not advance	
Dalma Ružičić-Benedek	K-1 500 m	1:54.048	5 Q	1:57.294	3 FA	1:55.095	7
Nikolina Moldovan; Milica Starović	K-2 500 m	1:46.410	5 Q	1:46.008	6 FB	1:48.146	10
Nikolina Moldovan; Olivera Moldovan; Dalma Ružičić-Benedek; Milica Starović	K-4 500 m	1:39.316	7 Q	1:38.398	5 FB	1:42.818	14

Qualification Legend: FA = Qualify to final (medal); FB = Qualify to final B (non-medal)

== Cycling ==
=== Road ===
Serbia has qualified one rider in the men's Olympic road race by virtue of his top 200 individual ranking in the 2015 UCI Europe Tour.

Athlete	Event	Time	Rank
Ivan Stević	Men's road race	Did not finish	

=== Mountain biking ===
Serbia has qualified one mountain biker for the women's Olympic cross-country race, as a result of her nation's seventeenth-place finish in the UCI Olympic Ranking List of 25 May 2016.

Athlete	Event	Time	Rank
Jovana Crnogorac	Women's cross-country	LAP (2 laps)	27

== Judo ==
Serbia has qualified one judoka for the men's middleweight category (90 kg) at the Games. Aleksander Kukolj was directly ranked among the top 22 eligible judokas for men in the IJF World Ranking List of 30 May 2016.

Athlete	Event	Round of 64	Round of 32	Round of 16	Quarterfinals	Semifinals	Repechage	Final / BM	
Athlete	Event	Opposition Result	Opposition Result	Opposition Result	Opposition Result	Opposition Result	Opposition Result	Opposition Result	Rank
Aleksandar Kukolj	Men's −90 kg	Bye	Žgank (SLO); W 100–000	Baker (JPN); L 000–100	Did not advance				

== Rowing ==
Serbia has qualified two boats for each of the following rowing classes into the Olympic regatta. One rowing crew had confirmed Olympic place for their boat in the men's pair at the 2015 FISA World Championships in Lac d'Aiguebelette, France, while the men's double sculls rowers had added one more boat to the Serbian roster as a result of their top two finish at the 2016 European & Final Qualification Regatta in Lucerne, Switzerland.

Athlete	Event	Heats		Repechage		Semifinals		Final	
Athlete	Event	Time	Rank	Time	Rank	Time	Rank	Time	Rank
Nenad Beđik; Miloš Vasić	Men's pair	DNF		6:34.52	2 SA/B	6:31.00	5 FB	7:04.71	10
Marko Marjanović; Andrija Šljukić	Men's double sculls	7:07.29	4 R	6:20.62	3 SA/B	6:27.66	5 FB	7:03.13	10

Qualification Legend: FA=Final A (medal); FB=Final B (non-medal); FC=Final C (non-medal); FD=Final D (non-medal); FE=Final E (non-medal); FF=Final F (non-medal); SA/B=Semifinals A/B; SC/D=Semifinals C/D; SE/F=Semifinals E/F; QF=Quarterfinals; R=Repechage

== Shooting ==
Serbian shooters have achieved quota places for the following events by virtue of their best finishes at the 2014 ISSF World Shooting Championships, the 2015 ISSF World Cup series, and European Championships or Games, as long as they obtained a minimum qualifying score (MQS) by 31 March 2016.

The entire shooting squad was named to the Serbian roster for the Games on 6 July 2016, with rifle specialist Stevan Pletikosić becoming the first male shooter to compete at his sixth Olympics. Notable absence in the roster was pistol legend Jasna Šekarić, who bid to establish a historic milestone as one of the first female athletes, alongside Georgian shooter Nino Salukvadze to appear in eight editions of the Games.

Men

Athlete	Event	Qualification		Final	
Athlete	Event	Points	Rank	Points	Rank
Dimitrije Grgić	10 m air pistol	579	9	Did not advance	
Dimitrije Grgić	50 m pistol	552	16	Did not advance	
Damir Mikec	10 m air pistol	575	25	Did not advance	
Damir Mikec	50 m pistol	551	18	Did not advance	
Stevan Pletikosić	50 m rifle prone	621.6	21	Did not advance	
Stevan Pletikosić	50 m rifle 3 positions	1168	25	Did not advance	
Milenko Sebić	10 m air rifle	620.0	33	Did not advance	
Milenko Sebić	50 m rifle prone	620.4	34	Did not advance	
Milenko Sebić	50 m rifle 3 positions	1172	11	Did not advance	
Milutin Stefanović	10 m air rifle	624.3	12	Did not advance	

Women

Athlete	Event	Qualification		Semifinal		Final	
Athlete	Event	Points	Rank	Points	Rank	Points	Rank
Andrea Arsović	10 m air rifle	413.5	26	—N/a		Did not advance	
Andrea Arsović	50 m rifle 3 positions	573	28	—N/a		Did not advance	
Zorana Arunović	10 m air pistol	382	11	—N/a		Did not advance	
Zorana Arunović	25 m pistol	576	19	Did not advance			
Ivana Anđušić Maksimović	10 m air rifle	415.4	12	—N/a		Did not advance	
Ivana Anđušić Maksimović	50 m rifle 3 positions	578	19	—N/a		Did not advance	
Bobana Veličković	10 m air pistol	385	6 Q	—N/a		96.4	7
Bobana Veličković	25 m pistol	576	21	Did not advance			

== Swimming ==
Serbian swimmers have so far achieved qualifying standards in the following events (up to a maximum of 2 swimmers in each event at the Olympic Qualifying Time (OQT), and potentially 1 at the Olympic Selection Time (OST)):

Athlete	Event	Heat		Semifinal		Final	
Athlete	Event	Time	Rank	Time	Rank	Time	Rank
Čaba Silađi	Men's 100 m breaststroke	1:00.76	26	Did not advance			
Velimir Stjepanović	Men's 100 m freestyle	49.24	32	Did not advance			
Velimir Stjepanović	Men's 200 m freestyle	1:46.64	10 Q	1:47.28	13	Did not advance	
Velimir Stjepanović	Men's 400 m freestyle	3:46.78	14	—N/a		Did not advance	
Anja Crevar	Women's 200 m individual medley	2:15.33	27	Did not advance			
Anja Crevar	Women's 400 m individual medley	4:43.19	20	—N/a		Did not advance	
Katarina Simonović	Women's 200 m freestyle	2:00.06	30	Did not advance			
Katarina Simonović	Women's 400 m freestyle	4:15.57	23	—N/a		Did not advance	

== Table tennis ==
Serbia has entered one athlete into the table tennis competition at the Games. Aleksandar Karakašević granted an invitation from ITTF to compete in the men's singles as one of the next seven highest-ranked eligible players, not yet qualified, on the Olympic Ranking List.

Athlete	Event	Preliminary	Round 1	Round 2	Round 3	Round of 16	Quarterfinals	Semifinals	Final / BM	
Athlete	Event	Opposition Result	Opposition Result	Opposition Result	Opposition Result	Opposition Result	Opposition Result	Opposition Result	Opposition Result	Rank
Aleksandar Karakašević	Men's singles	Yan (AUS); W 4–2	Drinkhall (GBR); L 1–4	Did not advance						

== Taekwondo ==
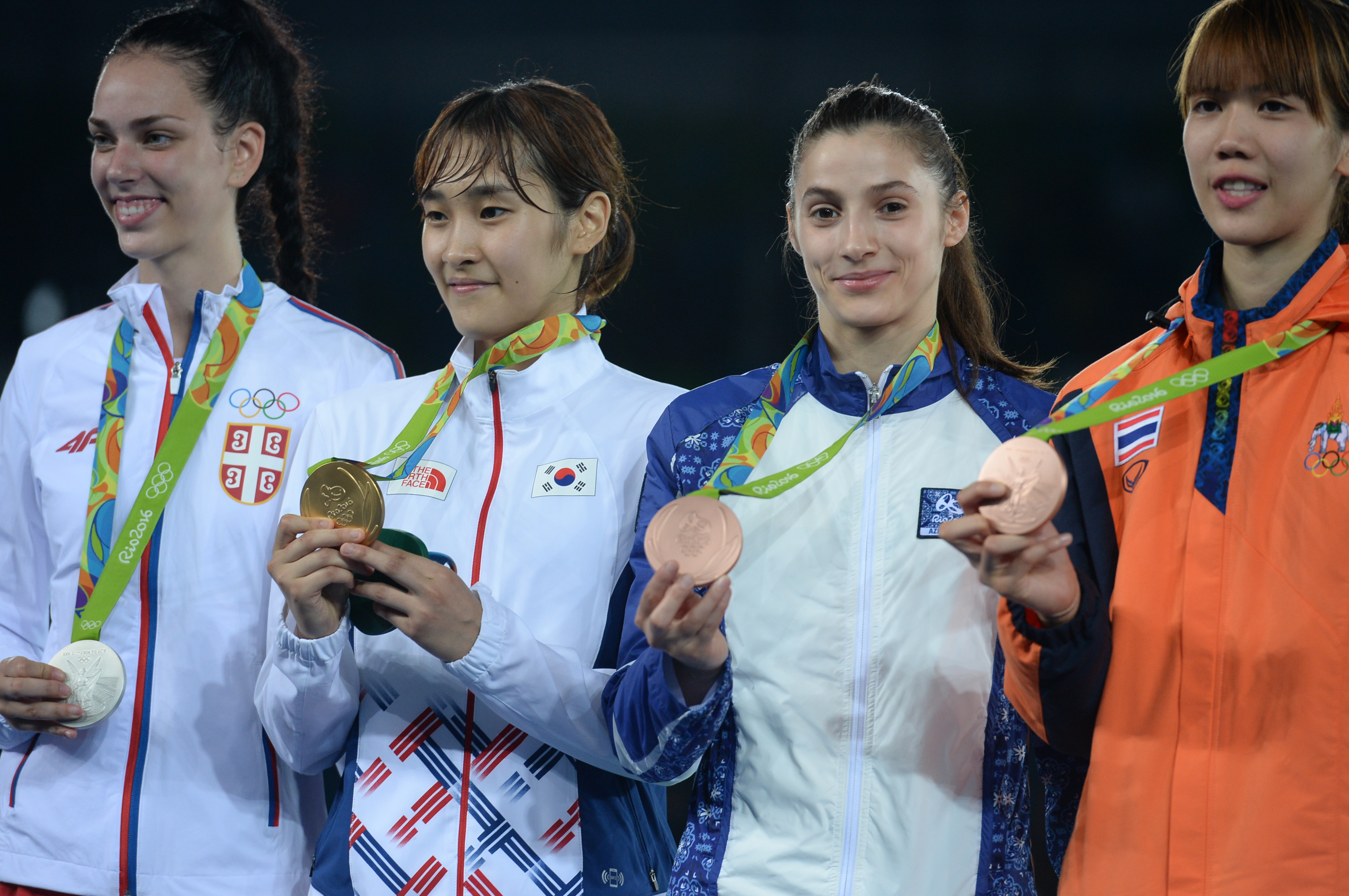
Tijana Bogdanović (left) with Women's −49 kg medalist

Serbia entered two athletes into the taekwondo competition at the Olympics. Reigning Olympic champion Milica Mandić qualified automatically for the women's heavyweight category (+67 kg) by finishing in the top 6 WTF Olympic rankings. 2015 European Games silver medalist Tijana Bogdanović secured the remaining spot on the Serbian team by virtue of her top two finish in the women's flyweight category (49 kg) at the 2016 European Qualification Tournament in Istanbul, Turkey.

Athlete	Event	Round of 16	Quarterfinals	Semifinals	Repechage	Final / BM	
Athlete	Event	Opposition Result	Opposition Result	Opposition Result	Opposition Result	Opposition Result	Rank
Tijana Bogdanović	Women's −49 kg	Abakarova (AZE); W 3–2	Wu Jy (CHN); W 17–7	Manjarrez (MEX); W 10–0	Bye	Kim S-h (KOR); L 6–7	2nd place, silver medalist(s)
Milica Mandić	Women's +67 kg	Skaar (NOR); W 8–2	Walkden (GBR); L 0–5	Did not advance			

== Tennis ==
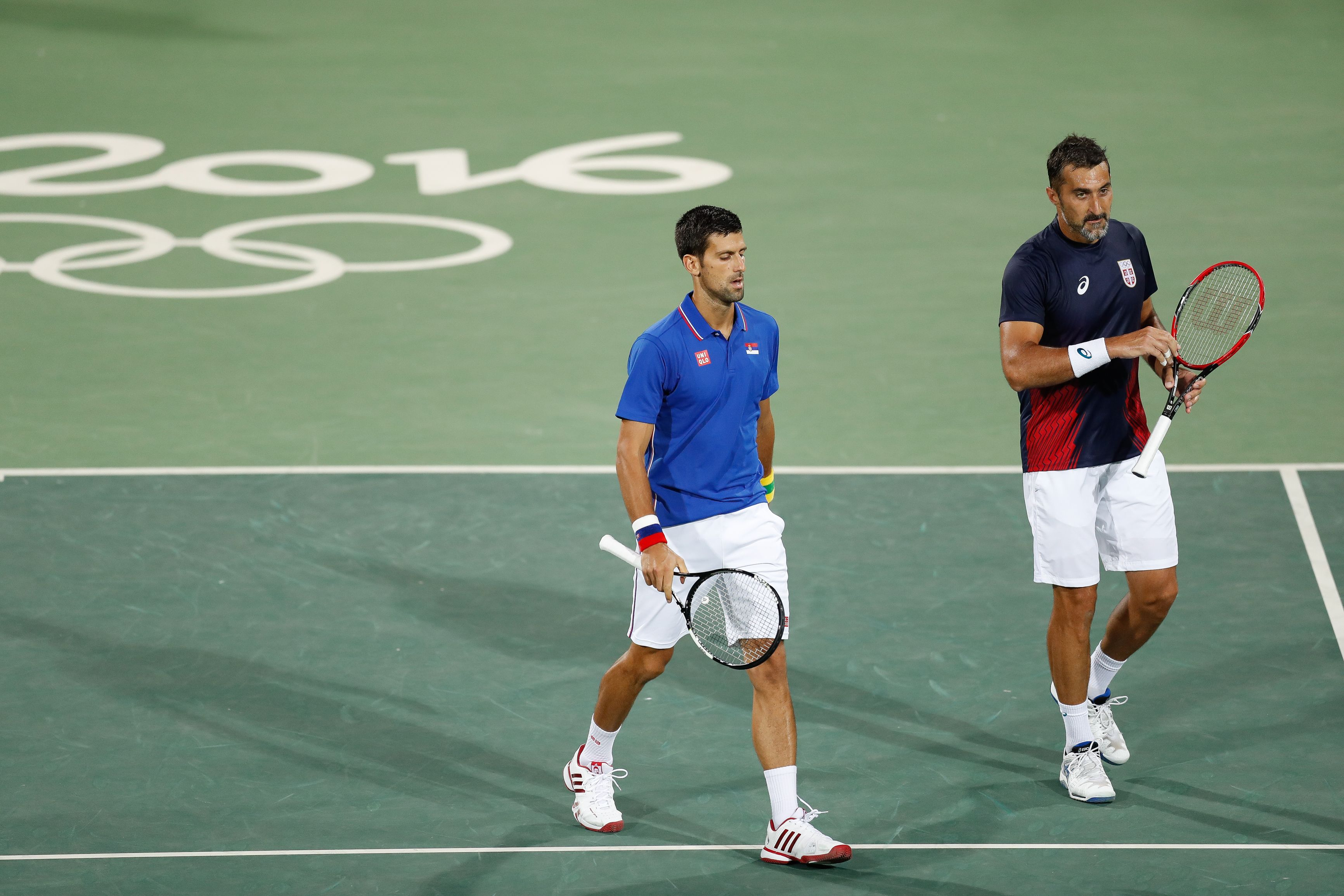
Novak Djokovic and Nenad Zimonjić in the second round of Men's doubles.

Serbia has entered six tennis players (three men and three women) into the Olympic tournament. Beijing 2008 bronze medalist and world no. 1 seed Novak Djokovic and London 2012 Olympian Viktor Troicki (world no. 21) qualified directly for the men's singles as three of the top 56 eligible players in the ATP World Rankings, while Ana Ivanovic (world no. 25) and three-time Olympian Jelena Janković (world no. 24) did so for the women's singles based on their WTA World Rankings as of 6 June 2016.

Having been directly entered to the singles, Djokovic and Janković also opted to play with their partners Nenad Zimonjić and Aleksandra Krunić, respectively, in the men's and women's doubles.

Athlete	Event	Round of 64	Round of 32	Round of 16	Quarterfinals	Semifinals	Final / BM	
Athlete	Event	Opposition Result	Opposition Result	Opposition Result	Opposition Result	Opposition Result	Opposition Result	Rank
Novak Djokovic	Men's singles	del Potro (ARG); L 6–7^{(4–7)}, 6–7^{(2–7)}	Did not advance					
Viktor Troicki	Men's singles	A Murray (GBR); L 3–6, 2–6	Did not advance					
Novak Djokovic; Nenad Zimonjić	Men's doubles	—N/a	Čilić / Draganja (CRO); W 6–2, 6–2	Melo / Soares (BRA); L 4–6, 4–6	Did not advance			
Ana Ivanovic	Women's singles	Suárez Navarro (ESP); L 6–2, 1–6, 2–6	Did not advance					
Jelena Janković	Women's singles	Withdrew on 7 August due to pectoralis injury						
Aleksandra Krunić	Women's singles	Mladenovic (FRA); L 1–6, 4–6	Did not advance					
Jelena Janković; Aleksandra Krunić	Women's doubles	—N/a	Konta / Watson (GBR); L 2–6, 1–6	Did not advance				

== Volleyball ==
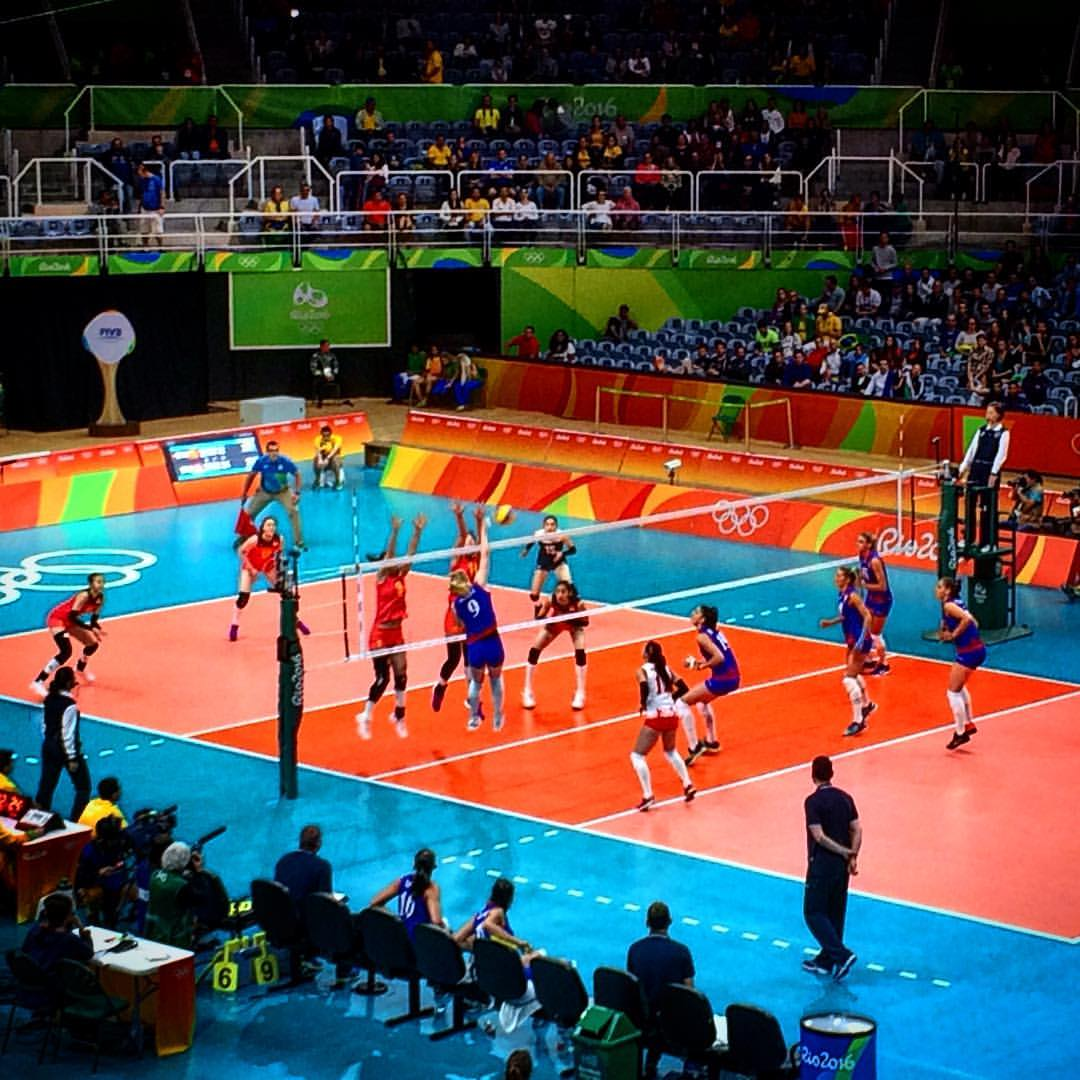
The group stage game against China

=== Indoor ===
==== Women's tournament ====
The Serbian women's volleyball team qualified for the Olympics by reaching the top two towards the final match of the 2015 FIVB Volleyball Women's World Cup in Japan.

Summary

Team	Event	Group stage						Quarterfinals	Semifinals	Final / BM	
Team	Event	Opposition Score	Opposition Score	Opposition Score	Opposition Score	Opposition Score	Rank	Opposition Score	Opposition Score	Opposition Score	Rank
Serbia women's	Women's tournament	Italy; W 3–0	Puerto Rico; W 3–0	United States; L 1–3	China; W 3–0	Netherlands; L 2–3	3 Q	Russia; W 3–0	United States; W 3–2	China; L 1–3	2nd place, silver medalist(s)

Team roster

The following is the Serbian roster in the women's volleyball tournament of the 2016 Summer Olympics.

Head coach: Zoran Terzić

No.	Name	Date of birth	Height	Weight	Spike	Block	2015–16 club
1	Bianka Buša	25 July 1994	1.87 m (6 ft 2 in)	74 kg (163 lb)	293 cm (115 in)	282 cm (111 in)	(Romania) CSM Târgoviște
2	Jovana Brakočević	5 March 1988	1.96 m (6 ft 5 in)	82 kg (181 lb)	310 cm (120 in)	295 cm (116 in)	(Turkey) Vakıfbank Istanbul
4	Bojana Živković	29 March 1988	1.86 m (6 ft 1 in)	72 kg (159 lb)	300 cm (120 in)	292 cm (115 in)	(Switzerland) Voléro Zürich
6	Tijana Malešević	18 March 1991	1.85 m (6 ft 1 in)	78 kg (172 lb)	300 cm (120 in)	286 cm (113 in)	(Italy) AGIL Novara
9	Brankica Mihajlović	13 April 1991	1.90 m (6 ft 3 in)	83 kg (183 lb)	315 cm (124 in)	311 cm (122 in)	(Turkey) Fenerbahçe
10	Maja Ognjenović (c)	6 August 1984	1.83 m (6 ft 0 in)	67 kg (148 lb)	300 cm (120 in)	293 cm (115 in)	(Italy) Nordmeccanica Piacenza
11	Stefana Veljković	9 January 1990	1.90 m (6 ft 3 in)	76 kg (168 lb)	320 cm (130 in)	305 cm (120 in)	(Poland) Chemik Police
12	Jelena Nikolić	13 April 1982	1.95 m (6 ft 5 in)	79 kg (174 lb)	315 cm (124 in)	300 cm (120 in)	(Turkey) Bursa BB
15	Jovana Stevanović	30 June 1992	1.93 m (6 ft 4 in)	72 kg (159 lb)	308 cm (121 in)	295 cm (116 in)	(Italy) Pomi Casalmaggiore
16	Milena Rašić	25 October 1990	1.93 m (6 ft 4 in)	72 kg (159 lb)	318 cm (125 in)	315 cm (124 in)	(Turkey) VakifBank Istanbul
17	Silvija Popović (L)	15 March 1986	1.78 m (5 ft 10 in)	65 kg (143 lb)	286 cm (113 in)	276 cm (109 in)	(Switzerland) Voléro Zürich
19	Tijana Bošković	8 March 1997	1.93 m (6 ft 4 in)	82 kg (181 lb)	325 cm (128 in)	317 cm (125 in)	(Turkey) Eczacıbaşı VitrA

Group play

Pos	Team	Pld	W	L	Pts	SW	SL	SR	SPW	SPL	SPR	Qualification
1	United States	5	5	0	14	15	5	3.000	470	400	1.175	Quarter-finals
2	Netherlands	5	4	1	11	14	7	2.000	455	425	1.071	Quarter-finals
3	Serbia	5	3	2	10	12	6	2.000	410	394	1.041	Quarter-finals
4	China	5	2	3	7	9	9	1.000	398	389	1.023	Quarter-finals
5	Italy	5	1	4	3	4	12	0.333	351	374	0.939	
6	Puerto Rico	5	0	5	0	0	15	0.000	277	379	0.731	

Source: FIVB
Rules for classification: Tiebreakers

6 August 2016; 22:35	Serbia	3–0	Italy	Ginásio do Maracanãzinho, Rio de Janeiro; Attendance: 4,373; Referees: Piotr Dudek (POL), Arturo Di Giacomo (BEL)
6 August 2016; 22:35	(27–25, 25–20, 25–23); Result Statistics			Ginásio do Maracanãzinho, Rio de Janeiro; Attendance: 4,373; Referees: Piotr Dudek (POL), Arturo Di Giacomo (BEL)

8 August 2016; 17:05	Serbia	3–0	Puerto Rico	Ginásio do Maracanãzinho, Rio de Janeiro; Attendance: 5,730; Referees: Kang Joo-hee (KOR), Andrey Zenovich (RUS)
8 August 2016; 17:05	(29–27, 25–18, 25–20); Result Statistics			Ginásio do Maracanãzinho, Rio de Janeiro; Attendance: 5,730; Referees: Kang Joo-hee (KOR), Andrey Zenovich (RUS)

10 August 2016; 15:00	United States	3–1	Serbia	Ginásio do Maracanãzinho, Rio de Janeiro; Attendance: 7,134; Referees: Hernán Casamiquela (ARG), Rogerio Espicalsky (BRA)
10 August 2016; 15:00	(25–17, 21–25, 25–18, 25–19); Result Statistics			Ginásio do Maracanãzinho, Rio de Janeiro; Attendance: 7,134; Referees: Hernán Casamiquela (ARG), Rogerio Espicalsky (BRA)

12 August 2016; 09:30	China	0–3	Serbia	Ginásio do Maracanãzinho, Rio de Janeiro; Attendance: 3,509; Referees: Kang Joo-hee (KOR), Susana Rodríguez (ESP)
12 August 2016; 09:30	(19–25, 19–25, 22–25); Result Statistics			Ginásio do Maracanãzinho, Rio de Janeiro; Attendance: 3,509; Referees: Kang Joo-hee (KOR), Susana Rodríguez (ESP)

14 August 2016; 09:30	Serbia	2–3	Netherlands	Ginásio do Maracanãzinho, Rio de Janeiro; Attendance: 6,387; Referees: Susana Rodríguez (ESP), Andrey Zenovich (RUS)
14 August 2016; 09:30	(22–25, 20–25, 25–22, 25–18, 8–15); Result Statistics			Ginásio do Maracanãzinho, Rio de Janeiro; Attendance: 6,387; Referees: Susana Rodríguez (ESP), Andrey Zenovich (RUS)

Quarterfinal

16 August 2016; 18:00	Russia	0–3	Serbia	Ginásio do Maracanãzinho, Rio de Janeiro; Attendance: 7,121; Referees: Susana Rodríguez (ESP), Hernán Casamiquela (ARG)
16 August 2016; 18:00	(9–25, 22–25, 21–25); Result Statistics			Ginásio do Maracanãzinho, Rio de Janeiro; Attendance: 7,121; Referees: Susana Rodríguez (ESP), Hernán Casamiquela (ARG)

Semifinal

18 August 2016; 13:00	Serbia	3–2	United States	Ginásio do Maracanãzinho, Rio de Janeiro; Attendance: 5,837; Referees: Andrey Zenovich (RUS), Nasr Shaaban (EGY)
18 August 2016; 13:00	(20–25, 25–17, 25–21, 16–25, 15–13); Result Statistics			Ginásio do Maracanãzinho, Rio de Janeiro; Attendance: 5,837; Referees: Andrey Zenovich (RUS), Nasr Shaaban (EGY)

Gold medal match

20 August 2016; 22:15	China	3–1	Serbia	Ginásio do Maracanãzinho, Rio de Janeiro; Attendance: 8,773; Referees: Susana Rodríguez (ESP), Patricia Rolf (USA)
20 August 2016; 22:15	(19–25, 25–17, 25–22, 25–23); Result Statistics			Ginásio do Maracanãzinho, Rio de Janeiro; Attendance: 8,773; Referees: Susana Rodríguez (ESP), Patricia Rolf (USA)

== Water polo ==
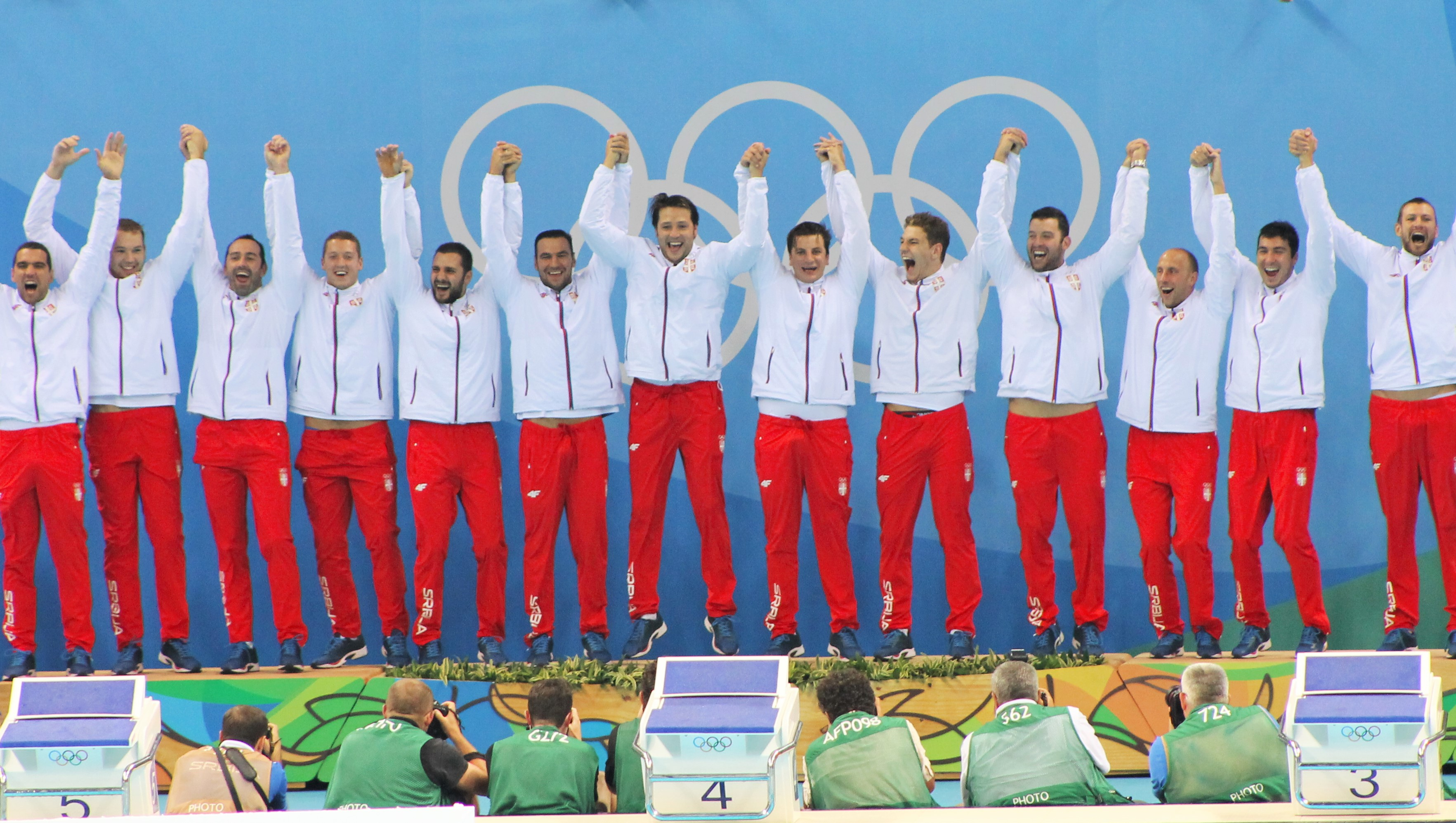
Serbia men's national water polo team celebrates after the gold medal match

Summary

Key:

- FT – After full time.
- P – Match decided by penalty-shootout.

Team	Event	Group Stage						Quarterfinal	Semifinal	Final / BM	
Team	Event	Opposition Score	Opposition Score	Opposition Score	Opposition Score	Opposition Score	Rank	Opposition Score	Opposition Score	Opposition Score	Rank
Serbia men's	Men's tournament	Hungary; D 13–13	Greece; D 9–9	Brazil; L 5–6	Australia; W 10–8	Japan; W 12–8	4	Spain; W 10–7	Italy; W 10–8	Croatia; W 11–7	1st place, gold medalist(s)

=== Men's tournament ===
The Serbian men's water polo team qualified for the Olympics by winning the 2015 FINA World League Super Final in Italy.

Team roster

The following is the Serbian roster in the men's water polo tournament of the 2016 Summer Olympics.

Head coach: Dejan Savić

SRB – Serbia (as of 5 August 2016)
No.	Player	Pos.	L/R	Height	Weight	Date of birth (age)	Apps	Club
1	Gojko Pijetlović	GK	B	1.94 m (6 ft 4 in)	92 kg (203 lb)	7 August 1983 (aged 32)	198	(Romania) CSM Digi Oradea
2	Dušan Mandić	D	L	2.02 m (6 ft 8 in)	105 kg (231 lb)	16 June 1994 (aged 22)	111	(Italy) Pro Recco
3	Živko Gocić (C)	CB	R	1.93 m (6 ft 4 in)	93 kg (205 lb)	22 August 1982 (aged 33)	353	(Hungary) Szolnoki Vízilabda SC
4	Sava Ranđelović	CB	R	1.93 m (6 ft 4 in)	98 kg (216 lb)	17 July 1993 (aged 23)	82	(Italy) AN Brescia
5	Miloš Ćuk	D	R	1.91 m (6 ft 3 in)	91 kg (201 lb)	21 December 1990 (aged 25)	124	(Hungary) Egri VK
6	Duško Pijetlović	CF	R	1.97 m (6 ft 6 in)	97 kg (214 lb)	25 April 1985 (aged 31)	261	(Italy) Pro Recco
7	Slobodan Nikić	CF	R	1.97 m (6 ft 6 in)	106 kg (234 lb)	25 January 1983 (aged 33)	346	(Turkey) Galatasaray S.K.
8	Milan Aleksić	CB	R	1.93 m (6 ft 4 in)	96 kg (212 lb)	13 May 1986 (aged 30)	202	(Hungary) Szolnoki Vízilabda SC
9	Nikola Jakšić	CB	R	1.97 m (6 ft 6 in)	89 kg (196 lb)	17 January 1997 (aged 19)	48	(Serbia) VK Partizan
10	Filip Filipović	D	L	1.96 m (6 ft 5 in)	101 kg (223 lb)	2 May 1987 (aged 29)	297	(Italy) Pro Recco
11	Andrija Prlainović	D	R	1.87 m (6 ft 2 in)	93 kg (205 lb)	28 April 1987 (aged 29)	271	(Hungary) Szolnoki Vízilabda SC
12	Stefan Mitrović	D	R	1.95 m (6 ft 5 in)	91 kg (201 lb)	29 March 1988 (aged 28)	198	(Hungary) Szolnoki Vízilabda SC
13	Branislav Mitrović	GK	B	2.01 m (6 ft 7 in)	100 kg (220 lb)	30 January 1985 (aged 31)	119	(Hungary) Egri VK
Average				1.95 m (6 ft 5 in)	96 kg (212 lb)	28 years, 205 days	201	

Group play

Pos	Team	Pld	W	D	L	GF	GA	GD	Pts	Qualification
1	Hungary	5	2	3	0	57	43	+14	7	Quarter-finals
2	Greece	5	2	2	1	41	40	+1	6	Quarter-finals
3	Brazil (H)	5	3	0	2	40	39	+1	6	Quarter-finals
4	Serbia	5	2	2	1	49	44	+5	6	Quarter-finals
5	Australia	5	2	1	2	44	40	+4	5	
6	Japan	5	0	0	5	36	61	−25	0	

Source: Rio2016
Rules for classification: 1) Points; 2) Head-to-head points; 3) Head-to-head goal difference; 4) Head-to-head goals scored; 5) Goal difference.
(H) Hosts

6 August 2016; 09:00	Report	Serbia	13–13	Hungary	Maria Lenk Aquatic Center, Rio de Janeiro; Referees: Adrian Alexandrescu (ROU), Radosław Koryzna (POL)
6 August 2016; 09:00	Report	Score by quarters: 3–5, 3–4, 3–2, 4–2			Maria Lenk Aquatic Center, Rio de Janeiro; Referees: Adrian Alexandrescu (ROU), Radosław Koryzna (POL)
6 August 2016; 09:00	Report	Filipović 3	Goals	Hosnyánszky 3	Maria Lenk Aquatic Center, Rio de Janeiro; Referees: Adrian Alexandrescu (ROU), Radosław Koryzna (POL)

8 August 2016; 09:00	Report	Serbia	9–9	Greece	Maria Lenk Aquatic Center, Rio de Janeiro; Referees: Mark Koganov (AZE), Joseph Peila (USA)
8 August 2016; 09:00	Report	Score by quarters: 1–2, 0–2, 4–3, 4–2			Maria Lenk Aquatic Center, Rio de Janeiro; Referees: Mark Koganov (AZE), Joseph Peila (USA)
8 August 2016; 09:00	Report	Filipović 2	Goals	Fountoulis 4	Maria Lenk Aquatic Center, Rio de Janeiro; Referees: Mark Koganov (AZE), Joseph Peila (USA)

10 August 2016; 19:30	Report	Brazil	6–5	Serbia	Maria Lenk Aquatic Center, Rio de Janeiro; Referees: Benjamin Mercier (FRA), Ni Shi Wei (CHN)
10 August 2016; 19:30	Report	Score by quarters: 0–2, 3–1, 2–0, 1–2			Maria Lenk Aquatic Center, Rio de Janeiro; Referees: Benjamin Mercier (FRA), Ni Shi Wei (CHN)
10 August 2016; 19:30	Report	Vrlić 2	Goals	five players 1	Maria Lenk Aquatic Center, Rio de Janeiro; Referees: Benjamin Mercier (FRA), Ni Shi Wei (CHN)

12 August 2016; 22:10	Report	Serbia	10–8	Australia	Maria Lenk Aquatic Center, Rio de Janeiro; Referees: Adrian Alexandrescu (ROU), Francesc Buch (ESP)
12 August 2016; 22:10	Report	Score by quarters: 2–2, 2–3, 2–1, 4–2			Maria Lenk Aquatic Center, Rio de Janeiro; Referees: Adrian Alexandrescu (ROU), Francesc Buch (ESP)
12 August 2016; 22:10	Report	three players 2	Goals	Cotterill 2	Maria Lenk Aquatic Center, Rio de Janeiro; Referees: Adrian Alexandrescu (ROU), Francesc Buch (ESP)

14 August 2016; 19:30	Report	Serbia	12–8	Japan	Olympic Aquatics Stadium, Rio de Janeiro; Referees: Nenad Peris (CRO), Benjamin Mercier (FRA)
14 August 2016; 19:30	Report	Score by quarters: 2–5, 3–0, 4–2, 3–1			Olympic Aquatics Stadium, Rio de Janeiro; Referees: Nenad Peris (CRO), Benjamin Mercier (FRA)
14 August 2016; 19:30	Report	Filipović 6	Goals	Takei 5	Olympic Aquatics Stadium, Rio de Janeiro; Referees: Nenad Peris (CRO), Benjamin Mercier (FRA)

Quarterfinal

16 August 2016; 12:20	Report	Serbia	10–7	Spain	Olympic Aquatics Stadium, Rio de Janeiro; Referees: Radosław Koryzna (POL), Daniel Flahive (AUS)
16 August 2016; 12:20	Report	Score by quarters: 3–1, 4–2, 0–2, 3–2			Olympic Aquatics Stadium, Rio de Janeiro; Referees: Radosław Koryzna (POL), Daniel Flahive (AUS)
16 August 2016; 12:20	Report	Mandić 4	Goals	Molina 3	Olympic Aquatics Stadium, Rio de Janeiro; Referees: Radosław Koryzna (POL), Daniel Flahive (AUS)

Semifinal

18 August 2016; 16:30	Report	Italy	8–10	Serbia	Olympic Aquatics Stadium, Rio de Janeiro; Referees: Georgios Stavridis (GRE), Daniel Flahive (AUS)
18 August 2016; 16:30	Report	Score by quarters: 0–3, 2–3, 0–1, 6–3			Olympic Aquatics Stadium, Rio de Janeiro; Referees: Georgios Stavridis (GRE), Daniel Flahive (AUS)
18 August 2016; 16:30	Report	three players 2	Goals	three players 2	Olympic Aquatics Stadium, Rio de Janeiro; Referees: Georgios Stavridis (GRE), Daniel Flahive (AUS)

Gold medal match

20 August 2016; 17:50	Report	Croatia	7–11	Serbia	Olympic Aquatics Stadium, Rio de Janeiro; Referees: Georgios Stavridis (GRE), Péter Molnár (HUN)
20 August 2016; 17:50	Report	Score by quarters: 2–3, 1–3, 2–3, 2–2			Olympic Aquatics Stadium, Rio de Janeiro; Referees: Georgios Stavridis (GRE), Péter Molnár (HUN)
20 August 2016; 17:50	Report	Sukno 3	Goals	Mandić 4	Olympic Aquatics Stadium, Rio de Janeiro; Referees: Georgios Stavridis (GRE), Péter Molnár (HUN)

== Wrestling ==
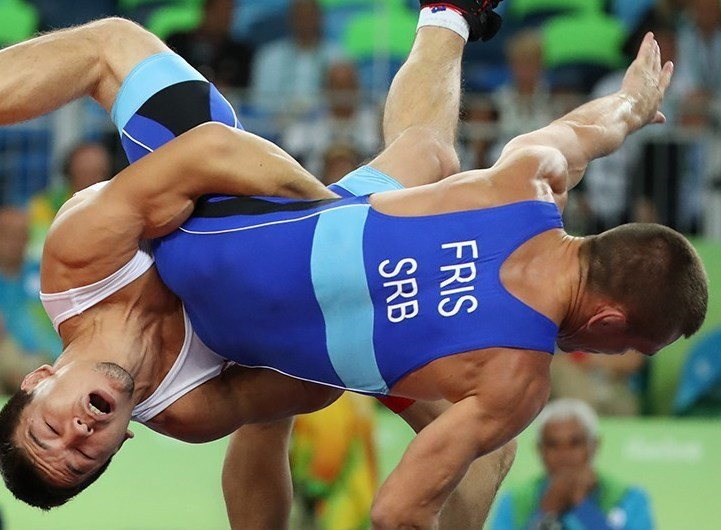
Kristijan Fris in the first round of the men's Greco-Roman 59 kg.

Serbia has qualified three wrestlers for each the following weight classes into the Olympic competition. One of them finished among the top six to secure an Olympic spot in the men's Greco-Roman 66 kg at the 2015 World Championships, while two more Olympic places were awarded to Serbian wrestlers, who progressed to the top two finals at the 2016 European Qualification Tournament.

Key:

- VT – Victory by Fall.
- PP – Decision by Points – the loser with technical points.
- PO – Decision by Points – the loser without technical points.
- ST – Decision by points – the loser without technical points and a margin of victory of at least 8 (Greco-Roman) or 10 (freestyle) points.

Men's Greco-Roman

Athlete	Event	Qualification	Round of 16	Quarterfinal	Semifinal	Repechage 1	Repechage 2	Final / BM	
Athlete	Event	Opposition Result	Opposition Result	Opposition Result	Opposition Result	Opposition Result	Opposition Result	Opposition Result	Rank
Kristijan Fris	−59 kg	Bye	Tasmuradov (UZB); L 1–3 ^{PP}	Did not advance					13
Davor Štefanek	−66 kg	Bye	Inoue (JPN); W 4–0 ^{ST}	Stäbler (GER); W 3–1 ^{PP}	Bolkvadze (GEO); W 5–0 ^{VT}	Bye		Arutyunyan (ARM); W 3–1 ^{PP}	1st place, gold medalist(s)
Viktor Nemeš	−75 kg	Bye	Turdiev (UZB); W 3–1 ^{PP}	Madsen (DEN); L 0–3 ^{PO}	Did not advance	Bye	Abdevali (IRI); L 1–3 ^{PP}	Did not advance	8

== Reaction to Kosovo's participation ==
Because of Albanian boycotts after the breakup of Yugoslavia, only Serbs from Kosovo and Metohija participated as part of Serbia and Montenegro and Serbia at the Olympics. In 2008 Kosovo unilaterally and in breach of UN Security Council resolutions declared independence from Serbia, which Serbia and most of the countries do not recognize and consider it Serbia's southern province. On 9 December 2014 the International Olympic Committee recognized the Olympic Committee of Kosovo.

In reaction to the decision of the International Olympic Committee to accept Kosovo as a full member, Vlade Divac said that the Serbian Olympic Committee did all they could while foreign minister Ivica Dačić and minister of sports Vanja Udovičić expressed disapproval, with Divac adding there would be no boycott of the games. Prior to the Rio 2016 opening ceremony, Udovičić advised Serbian athletes to withdraw themselves from any medal ceremonies if they have to share the podium with athletes from Kosovo.

== See also ==
- Serbia at the 2016 Summer Paralympics
