= Norway at the 2016 Summer Olympics =

- IOC code: NOR
- NOC: Norwegian Olympic Committee and Confederation of Sports
- Website: www.idrett.no (in Norwegian)

in Rio de Janeiro
- Competitors: 62 in 13 sports
- Flag bearers: Ole Kristian Bryhn (opening); Kari Aalvik Grimsbø (closing)
- Medals Ranked 74th: Gold 0 Silver 0 Bronze 4 Total 4

Summer Olympics appearances (overview)
- 1900; 1904; 1908; 1912; 1920; 1924; 1928; 1932; 1936; 1948; 1952; 1956; 1960; 1964; 1968; 1972; 1976; 1980; 1984; 1988; 1992; 1996; 2000; 2004; 2008; 2012; 2016; 2020; 2024

Other related appearances
- 1906 Intercalated Games

Norway competed at the 2016 Summer Olympics in Rio de Janeiro, Brazil, from 5 to 21 August 2016. Since the nation's Olympic debut in 1900, Norwegian athletes have appeared in every edition of the Summer Olympic Games, except for two occasions: the 1904 Summer Olympics in St. Louis and the 1980 Summer Olympics in Moscow, due to the country's support for the United States-led boycott.

Norwegian Olympic Committee and Confederation of Sports sent a team of 62 athletes, 29 men and 33 women, to compete in 13 sports at the Games. For only the fourth time in Olympic history, the Norwegian roster featured more female athletes than males, due to the participation of the women's handball squad at the Games, returning as two-time defending champions. Among the sports, Norway made its debut in golf (new to the 2016 Games) and triathlon, as well as returning to taekwondo after not being represented at London 2012.

Topping the list of athletes on the Norwegian roster were mountain biker and Athens 2004 champion Gunn-Rita Dahle Flesjå, who qualified for her fifth Olympic cross-country race as the oldest and most experienced female competitor (aged 43), and rowing legend Olaf Tufte, who sought to add to his medal tally with a fourth medal at his sixth straight Olympics.

Apart from Flesjå and Tufte, several Norwegian athletes also returned to compete in Rio de Janeiro, including handball team captain Kari Aalvik Grimsbø, middle-distance runner Henrik Ingebrigtsen in the men's 1500 m, Gambian-born sprinter Jaysuma Saidy Ndure, and small-bore rifle shooter and London 2012 finalist Ole-Kristian Bryhn, who was nominated by the committee to lead the delegation as the flag bearer in the opening ceremony.

Norway left Rio de Janeiro with four bronze medals, the country's worst Olympic performance since 1964, and the first time Norway competed without winning any gold medals since 1984. Greco-Roman wrestler Stig André Berge brought home the country's first medal in the sport after 24 years, while Tufte successfully completed a full set of medals by securing a bronze alongside his partner Kjetil Borch in the men's double sculls, following his silver from Sydney 2000, and two golds in the single sculls from Athens 2004 and Beijing 2008, respectively. Having entered the Games as two-time defending champions, the women's handball squad (led by Grimsbø) suffered a humiliating 37–38 defeat to Russia in the semifinals, but found some solace in overpowering the Dutch for the bronze.

== Medalists ==
Medal	Name	Sport	Event	Date
Bronze	Kjetil Borch; Olaf Tufte	Rowing	Men's double sculls	11 August
Bronze	Kristoffer Brun; Are Strandli	Rowing	Men's lightweight double sculls	12 August
Bronze	Stig André Berge	Wrestling	Men's Greco-Roman 59 kg	14 August
Bronze	Norway women's national handball team: Kari Aalvik Grimsbø; Ida Alstad; Emilie Hegh Arntzen; Stine Bredal Oftedal; Marit Malm Frafjord; Camilla Herrem; Veronica Kristiansen; Amanda Kurtović; Katrine Lunde; Heidi Løke; Mari Molid; Nora Mørk; Linn-Kristin Riegelhuth Koren; Sanna Solberg	Handball	Women's tournament	20 August

Medals by sport
Sport	1st place, gold medalist(s)	2nd place, silver medalist(s)	3rd place, bronze medalist(s)	Total
Rowing	0	0	2	2
Wrestling	0	0	1	1
Handball	0	0	1	1
Total	0	0	4	4

Medals by day
Day	1st place, gold medalist(s)	2nd place, silver medalist(s)	3rd place, bronze medalist(s)	Total
August 6	0	0	0	0
August 7	0	0	0	0
August 8	0	0	0	0
August 9	0	0	0	0
August 10	0	0	0	0
August 11	0	0	1	1
August 12	0	0	1	1
August 13	0	0	0	0
August 14	0	0	1	1
August 15	0	0	0	0
August 16	0	0	0	0
August 17	0	0	0	0
August 18	0	0	0	0
August 19	0	0	0	0
August 20	0	0	1	1
Total	0	0	4	4

Medals by gender
Gender	1st place, gold medalist(s)	2nd place, silver medalist(s)	3rd place, bronze medalist(s)	Total
Male	0	0	3	3
Female	0	0	1	1
Total	0	0	4	4

== Competitors ==
The following is the list of number of competitors participating in the Games. Note that reserves in handball are not counted as athletes:

Sport	Men	Women	Total
Archery	1	0	1
Athletics	8	7	15
Cycling	5	2	7
Golf	1	2	3
Gymnastics	1	0	1
Handball	0	14	14
Rowing	5	0	5
Sailing	2	4	6
Shooting	3	1	4
Swimming	1	1	2
Taekwondo	0	1	1
Triathlon	1	0	1
Wrestling	1	1	2
Total	29	33	62

== Archery ==
One Norwegian archer has qualified for the men's individual recurve at the Olympics by virtue of a top five national finish at the 2016 Archery World Cup meet in Antalya, Turkey.

Athlete	Event	Ranking round		Round of 64	Round of 32	Round of 16	Quarterfinals	Semifinals	Final / BM	
Athlete	Event	Score	Seed	Opposition Score	Opposition Score	Opposition Score	Opposition Score	Opposition Score	Opposition Score	Rank
Bård Nesteng	Men's individual	663	26	Yu G-l (TPE); W 6–5	Furukawa (JPN); L 0–6	Did not advance				

== Athletics ==
Norwegian athletes have so far achieved qualifying standards in the following athletics events (up to a maximum of 3 athletes in each event):

On May 30, 2016, race walker Håvard Haukenes and long-distance runner Karoline Bjerkeli Grøvdal were the first Norwegian athletes in track and field to be officially selected to the Olympic roster. Two-time Olympian Erik Tysse, marathon runner Sondre Nordstad Moen, and discus thrower Sven Martin Skagestad were named as part of the second batch of nominated athletes on June 19, 2016. Eleven further athletes rounded out the track and field lineup for the Games on July 15, 2016.

Key

- Note–Ranks given for track events are within the athlete's heat only
- Q = Qualified for the next round
- q = Qualified for the next round as a fastest loser or, in field events, by position without achieving the qualifying target
- NR = National record
- N/A = Round not applicable for the event
- Bye = Athlete not required to compete in round

Track & road events
Men

Athlete	Event	Heat		Semifinal		Final	
Athlete	Event	Result	Rank	Result	Rank	Result	Rank
Jaysuma Saidy Ndure	200 m	20.78	=7	Did not advance			
Filip Ingebrigtsen	1500 m	DSQ		Did not advance			
Henrik Ingebrigtsen	1500 m	3:38.50	5 Q	3:42.51	11	Did not advance	
Karsten Warholm	400 m hurdles	48.49	1 Q	48.81	4	Did not advance	
Sondre Nordstad Moen	Marathon	—N/a				2:14:17	19
Erik Tysse	20 km walk	—N/a				1:26:06	48
Håvard Haukenes	50 km walk	—N/a				3:46:33	7

Women

Athlete	Event	Heat		Quarterfinal		Semifinal		Final	
Athlete	Event	Result	Rank	Result	Rank	Result	Rank	Result	Rank
Ezinne Okparaebo	100 m	Bye		11.43	4	Did not advance			
Hedda Hynne	800 m	2:01.64	5	—N/a		Did not advance			
Karoline Bjerkeli Grøvdal	5000 m	15:17.83	4 Q	—N/a				14:57.53	7
Karoline Bjerkeli Grøvdal	10000 m	—N/a						31:14.07	9
Isabelle Pedersen	100 m hurdles	12.86	3 Q	—N/a		12.88	3	Did not advance	
Amalie Iuel	400 m hurdles	56.75	6	—N/a		Did not advance			
Ingeborg Løvnes	3000 m steeplechase	9:44.85	13	—N/a				Did not advance	

Field events

Athlete	Event	Qualification		Final	
Athlete	Event	Distance	Position	Distance	Position
Sven Martin Skagestad	Men's discus throw	62.45	13	Did not advance	
Tonje Angelsen	Women's high jump	1.80	32	Did not advance	

== Cycling ==
=== Road ===
Norwegian riders qualified for five quota places in the men's Olympic road race by virtue of their top 15 national finish in the 2015 UCI World Tour. One additional spot was awarded to the Norwegian cyclist in the women's road race by virtue of her top 100 individual placement in the 2016 UCI World Rankings.

Athlete	Event	Time	Rank
Sven Erik Bystrøm	Men's road race	Did not finish	
Edvald Boasson Hagen	Men's road race	Did not finish	
Edvald Boasson Hagen	Men's time trial	1:21:12.35	30
Vegard Stake Laengen	Men's road race	6:30:05	50
Lars Petter Nordhaug	Men's road race	6:30:05	48
Vita Heine	Women's road race	3:58:34	33
Vita Heine	Women's time trial	50:23.39	25

=== Mountain biking ===
Norway has qualified one mountain biker for the women's Olympic cross-country race, as a result of her nation's tenth-place finish in the UCI Olympic Ranking List of May 25, 2016.

Athlete	Event	Time	Rank
Gunn-Rita Dahle Flesjå	Women's cross-country	1:33:34	10

=== BMX ===
Norwegian riders qualified for one men's quota place for BMX at the Olympics, as a result of the nation's top four finish in the UCI BMX Individual Ranking List of May 31, 2016. BMX rider Tore Navrestad were named as part of the second batch of nominated athletes to the Olympic roster on June 19, 2016.

Athlete	Event	Seeding		Quarterfinal		Semifinal		Final	
Athlete	Event	Result	Rank	Points	Rank	Points	Rank	Result	Rank
Tore Navrestad	Men's BMX	36.484	28	19	6	Did not advance			

== Golf ==
Norway has entered three golfers into the Olympic tournament. Espen Kofstad (world no. 291), Suzann Pettersen (world no. 18), and Marianne Skarpnord (world no. 155) qualified directly among the top 60 eligible players for their respective individual events based on the IGF World Rankings as of 11 July 2016.

Athlete	Event	Round 1	Round 2	Round 3	Round 4	Total		
Athlete	Event	Score	Score	Score	Score	Score	Par	Rank
Espen Kofstad	Men's	72	76	69	69	286	+2	=43
Suzann Pettersen	Women's	71	69	69	68	277	−7	10
Marianne Skarpnord	Women's	69	66	75	73	283	−1	=25

== Gymnastics ==
=== Artistic ===
Norway has entered one artistic gymnast into the Olympic competition for the first time since 2000. Stian Skjerahaug had claimed his Olympic spot in the men's apparatus and all-around events at the Olympic Test Event in Rio de Janeiro.

Men

Athlete	Event	Qualification								Final							
Athlete	Event	Apparatus						Total	Rank	Apparatus						Total	Rank
Athlete	Event	F	PH	R	V	PB	HB	Total	Rank	F	PH	R	V	PB	HB	Total	Rank
Stian Skjerahaug	All-around	14.166	14.233	13.266	14.700	14.266	13.700	84.331	32	Did not advance							

== Handball ==
Summary

Key:

- ET – After extra time
- P – Match decided by penalty-shootout.

Team	Event	Group Stage						Quarterfinal	Semifinal	Final / BM	
Team	Event	Opposition Score	Opposition Score	Opposition Score	Opposition Score	Opposition Score	Rank	Opposition Score	Opposition Score	Opposition Score	Rank
Norway women's	Women's tournament	Brazil; L 28–31	Spain; W 27–24	Angola; W 30–20	Montenegro; W 28–19	Romania; W 28–27	2	Sweden; W 33–20	Russia; L 37–38^{ET}	Netherlands; W 36–26	3rd place, bronze medalist(s)

=== Women's tournament ===
The Norwegian women's handball team qualified for the Olympics by winning the 2015 World Championships in Denmark.

Team roster

The following is the Norwegian roster in the women's handball tournament of the 2016 Summer Olympics.

Head coach: (Iceland) Thorir Hergeirsson

No.	Pos.	Name	Date of birth (age)	Height	App.	Goals	Club
1	GK	Kari Aalvik Grimsbø	4 January 1985 (aged 31)	1.80 m	137	0	(Hungary) Győri ETO
2	LB	Mari Molid	8 August 1990 (aged 25)	1.78 m	92	56	(Denmark) Randers HK
3	CB	Emilie Hegh Arntzen	1 January 1994 (aged 22)	1.83 m	32	18	(Norway) Byåsen HE
4	LB	Veronica Kristiansen	10 July 1990 (aged 26)	1.75 m	70	189	(Denmark) FC Midtjylland
5	LB	Ida Alstad	13 June 1985 (aged 31)	1.72 m	135	308	(Norway) Byåsen HE
6	P	Heidi Løke	12 December 1982 (aged 33)	1.73 m	166	619	(Hungary) Győri ETO
9	RB	Nora Mørk	5 April 1991 (aged 25)	1.69 m	77	329	(Hungary) Győri ETO
10	CB	Stine Bredal Oftedal	25 September 1991 (aged 24)	1.68 m	115	228	(France) Issy-Paris Hand
14	P	Marit Malm Frafjord	25 November 1985 (aged 30)	1.82 m	175	357	(Norway) Larvik HK
16	GK	Katrine Lunde	30 March 1980 (aged 36)	1.80 m	253	3	(Russia) Rostov-Don
18	RW	Linn-Kristin Riegelhuth Koren	1 August 1984 (aged 32)	1.75 m	271	967	(Norway) Larvik HK
22	RW	Amanda Kurtović	25 July 1991 (aged 25)	1.75 m	73	183	(Norway) Larvik HK
23	LW	Camilla Herrem	8 October 1986 (aged 29)	1.67 m	184	483	(North Macedonia) Vardar
24	LW	Sanna Solberg	16 June 1990 (aged 26)	1.78 m	76	137	(Norway) Larvik HK

Group play

Pos	Team	Pld	W	D	L	GF	GA	GD	Pts	Qualification
1	Brazil (H)	5	4	0	1	138	117	+21	8	Quarter-finals
2	Norway	5	4	0	1	141	121	+20	8	Quarter-finals
3	Spain	5	3	0	2	125	116	+9	6	Quarter-finals
4	Angola	5	2	0	3	116	128	−12	4	Quarter-finals
5	Romania	5	2	0	3	108	119	−11	4	
6	Montenegro	5	0	0	5	107	134	−27	0	

Source: IHF
Rules for classification: 1) Points; 2) Head-to-head points; 3) Head-to-head goal difference; 4) Head-to-head goals scored; 5) Goal difference; 6) Goals scored; 7) Draw.
(H) Hosts

6 August 2016; 09:30	Norway	28–31	Brazil	Future Arena, Rio de Janeiro; Attendance: 7,780; Referees: Horáček, Novotný (CZE)
6 August 2016; 09:30	Mørk 12	(16–17)	Belo 12	Future Arena, Rio de Janeiro; Attendance: 7,780; Referees: Horáček, Novotný (CZE)
6 August 2016; 09:30	2× (yellow card) 2× (suspension)	Report	2× (yellow card) 8× (suspension) 1× (red card)	Future Arena, Rio de Janeiro; Attendance: 7,780; Referees: Horáček, Novotný (CZE)

8 August 2016; 14:40	Spain	24–27	Norway	Future Arena, Rio de Janeiro; Referees: Geipel, Helbig (GER)
8 August 2016; 14:40	Cabral 5	(10–11)	Kristiansen 7	Future Arena, Rio de Janeiro; Referees: Geipel, Helbig (GER)
8 August 2016; 14:40	2× (yellow card) 3× (suspension)	Report	4× (yellow card) 7× (suspension) 1× (red card)	Future Arena, Rio de Janeiro; Referees: Geipel, Helbig (GER)

10 August 2016; 16:40	Norway	30–20	Angola	Future Arena, Rio de Janeiro; Referees: Bonaventura, Bonaventura (FRA)
10 August 2016; 16:40	Mørk 8	(16–8)	Guialo 8	Future Arena, Rio de Janeiro; Referees: Bonaventura, Bonaventura (FRA)
10 August 2016; 16:40	2× (yellow card) 3× (suspension)	Report	2× (yellow card) 4× (suspension) 1× (red card)	Future Arena, Rio de Janeiro; Referees: Bonaventura, Bonaventura (FRA)

12 August 2016; 16:40	Montenegro	19–28	Norway	Future Arena, Rio de Janeiro; Referees: Coulibaly, Diabaté (CIV)
12 August 2016; 16:40	Jauković 5	(11–16)	Mørk 6	Future Arena, Rio de Janeiro; Referees: Coulibaly, Diabaté (CIV)
12 August 2016; 16:40	2× (yellow card) 5× (suspension)	Report	3× (yellow card) 4× (suspension)	Future Arena, Rio de Janeiro; Referees: Coulibaly, Diabaté (CIV)

14 August 2016; 16:40	Norway	28–27	Romania	Future Arena, Rio de Janeiro; Referees: Alpaidze, Berekzina (RUS)
14 August 2016; 16:40	Kristiansen 7	(14–13)	Neagu 11	Future Arena, Rio de Janeiro; Referees: Alpaidze, Berekzina (RUS)
14 August 2016; 16:40	3× (yellow card) 6× (suspension)	Report	3× (yellow card) 6× (suspension)	Future Arena, Rio de Janeiro; Referees: Alpaidze, Berekzina (RUS)

Quarterfinal

16 August 2016; 17:00	Sweden	20–33	Norway	Future Arena, Rio de Janeiro; Referees: Bonaventura, Bonaventura (FRA)
16 August 2016; 17:00	Gulldén 9	(7–19)	Oftedal 6	Future Arena, Rio de Janeiro; Referees: Bonaventura, Bonaventura (FRA)
16 August 2016; 17:00	3× (yellow card) 1× (suspension)	Report	2× (yellow card) 1× (suspension)	Future Arena, Rio de Janeiro; Referees: Bonaventura, Bonaventura (FRA)

Semifinal

18 August 2016
20:30
Norway
37–38 (ET)
Russia
Future Arena, Rio de Janeiro
Referees: Lah, Sok (SLO)
Mørk 14
(16–18)
Bobrovnikova 8
3× (yellow card) 7× (suspension)
Report
4× (yellow card) 5× (suspension)

FT: 31–31 ET: 6–7

Bronze medal match

20 August 2016; 11:30	Netherlands	26–36	Norway	Future Arena, Rio de Janeiro; Referees: Bonaventura, Bonaventura (FRA)
20 August 2016; 11:30	Groot 6	(13–19)	Mørk 7	Future Arena, Rio de Janeiro; Referees: Bonaventura, Bonaventura (FRA)
20 August 2016; 11:30	3× (yellow card)	Report	1× (yellow card) 1× (suspension)	Future Arena, Rio de Janeiro; Referees: Bonaventura, Bonaventura (FRA)

== Rowing ==
Norway has qualified three boats for each of the following rowing classes into the Olympic regatta. Two rowing crews had confirmed Olympic places for their boats each in the men's single sculls and men's pair at the 2015 FISA World Championships in Lac d'Aiguebelette, France, while the men's double sculls rowers had added one more boat to the Norwegian roster as a result of their top two finish at the 2016 European & Final Qualification Regatta in Lucerne, Switzerland. The rowing team was named as part of the first batch of nominated athletes to the Olympic roster on May 30, 2016.

Athlete	Event	Heats		Repechage		Quarterfinals		Semifinals		Final	
Athlete	Event	Time	Rank	Time	Rank	Time	Rank	Time	Rank	Time	Rank
Nils Jakob Hoff	Men's single sculls	7:17.47	1 QF	Bye		6:57.94	3 SA/B	7:39.12	6 FB	7:02.66	11
Kjetil Borch; Olaf Tufte	Men's double sculls	6:30.58	2 SA/B	Bye		—N/a		6:13.50	2 FA	6:53.25	3rd place, bronze medalist(s)
Kristoffer Brun; Are Strandli	Men's lightweight double sculls	6:24.81	1 SA/B	Bye		—N/a		6:38.65	2 FA	6:31.39	3rd place, bronze medalist(s)

Qualification Legend: FA=Final A (medal); FB=Final B (non-medal); FC=Final C (non-medal); FD=Final D (non-medal); FE=Final E (non-medal); FF=Final F (non-medal); SA/B=Semifinals A/B; SC/D=Semifinals C/D; SE/F=Semifinals E/F; QF=Quarterfinals; R=Repechage

== Sailing ==
Norwegian sailors have qualified one boat in each of the following classes through the 2014 ISAF Sailing World Championships, the individual fleet Worlds, and European qualifying regattas.

On May 30, 2016, returning Olympian Kristian Ruth (Laser), along with Finn yachtsman Anders Pedersen and skiff sisters Ragna and Maia Agerup, were the first Norwegian sailors to be officially selected to the Olympic roster. Meanwhile, windsurfer Maria Mollestad and Laser Radial sailor Tiril Bue rounded out the crew selection as part of the second batch of nominated athletes on June 19, 2016.

Athlete	Event	Race													Net points	Final rank
Athlete	Event	1	2	3	4	5	6	7	8	9	10	11	12	M*	Net points	Final rank
Kristian Ruth	Men's Laser	~~UFD~~	13	32	2	29	16	25	BFD	15	30	—N/a		EL	209	27
Anders Pedersen	Men's Finn	8	16	18	8	~~22~~	16	9	14	5	15	—N/a		EL	32	17
Maria Mollestad	Women's RS:X	14	10	~~20~~	14	18	20	14	6	11	7	17	11	EL	142	12
Tiril Bue	Women's Laser Radial	18	18	13	6	19	24	22	25	18	~~27~~	—N/a		EL	163	23
Maia Agerup; Ragna Agerup	Women's 49erFX	10	~~18~~	15	17	9	17	13	4	6	13	17	11	EL	132	14

M = Medal race; EL = Eliminated – did not advance into the medal race

== Shooting ==
Norwegian shooters have achieved quota places for the following events by virtue of their best finishes at the 2014 and 2015 ISSF World Championships, the 2015 ISSF World Cup series, and European Championships or Games, as long as they obtained a minimum qualifying score (MQS) by March 31, 2016. Two-time Olympian Are Hansen, along with returnees Odd Arne Brekne, Ole Kristian Bryhn, and Malin Westerheim from London 2012, were named to the Olympic roster at the Munich leg of the ISSF World Cup series on June 1, 2016.

Athlete	Event	Qualification		Final	
Athlete	Event	Points	Rank	Points	Rank
Odd Arne Brekne	Men's 50 m rifle prone	620.9	28	Did not advance	
Odd Arne Brekne	Men's 50 m rifle 3 positions	1171	13	Did not advance	
Ole Kristian Bryhn	Men's 10 m air rifle	617.9	40	Did not advance	
Ole Kristian Bryhn	Men's 50 m rifle prone	616.7	43	Did not advance	
Ole Kristian Bryhn	Men's 50 m rifle 3 positions	1777	3 Q	400.4	8
Are Hansen	Men's 10 m air rifle	624.4	10	Did not advance	
Malin Westerheim	Women's 10 m air rifle	412.2	30	Did not advance	
Malin Westerheim	Women's 50 m rifle 3 positions	578	17	Did not advance	

Qualification Legend: Q = Qualify for the next round; q = Qualify for the bronze medal (shotgun)

== Swimming ==
Norwegian swimmers have so far achieved qualifying standards in the following events (up to a maximum of 2 swimmers in each event at the Olympic Qualifying Time (OQT), and potentially 1 at the Olympic Selection Time (OST)):

Athlete	Event	Heat		Semifinal		Final	
Athlete	Event	Time	Rank	Time	Rank	Time	Rank
Henrik Christiansen	Men's 200 m freestyle	1:50.09	40	Did not advance			
Henrik Christiansen	Men's 400 m freestyle	3:47.90	17	—N/a		Did not advance	
Henrik Christiansen	Men's 1500 m freestyle	14:55.40	8 Q	—N/a		15:02.66	8
Susann Bjørnsen	Women's 50 m freestyle	25.05	24	Did not advance			
Susann Bjørnsen	Women's 100 m freestyle	55.35	27	Did not advance			

== Taekwondo ==
Norway entered one athlete into the taekwondo competition at the Olympics. Tina Skaar secured a place in the women's heavyweight category (+67 kg) by virtue of her top two finish at the 2016 European Qualification Tournament in Istanbul, Turkey.

Athlete	Event	Round of 16	Quarterfinals	Semifinals	Repechage	Final / BM	
Athlete	Event	Opposition Result	Opposition Result	Opposition Result	Opposition Result	Opposition Result	Rank
Tina Skaar	Women's +67 kg	Mandić (SRB); L 2–8	Did not advance				

== Triathlon ==
Norway has entered one triathlete to compete at the Games. Kristian Blummenfelt was ranked among the top 43 eligible triathletes in the men's event based on the ITU Olympic Qualification List as of May 15, 2016.

Athlete	Event	Swim (1.5 km)	Trans 1	Bike (40 km)	Trans 2	Run (10 km)	Total Time	Rank
Kristian Blummenfelt	Men's	17:39	0:49	56:12	0:34	32:17	1:47:31	13

== Wrestling ==
Norway has qualified two wrestlers for each of the following weight classes into the Olympic competition. One of them had claimed an Olympic spot in the men's Greco-Roman 59 kg with his semifinal triumph at the initial meet of the World Qualification Tournament in Ulaanbaatar, while the other did the same feat in the women's freestyle 69 kg at the final meet in Istanbul.

Key:

- VT – Victory by Fall.
- PP – Decision by Points – the loser with technical points.
- PO – Decision by Points – the loser without technical points.
- ST – Decision by points – the loser without technical points and a margin of victory of at least 8 (Greco-Roman) or 10 (freestyle) points.

Men's Greco-Roman

Athlete	Event	Qualification	Round of 16	Quarterfinal	Semifinal	Repechage 1	Repechage 2	Final / BM	
Athlete	Event	Opposition Result	Opposition Result	Opposition Result	Opposition Result	Opposition Result	Opposition Result	Opposition Result	Rank
Stig André Berge	−59 kg	Lee J-b (KOR); W 3–0 ^{PO}	Daurov (BLR); W 3–0 ^{PO}	Ota (JPN); L 0–3 ^{PO}	Did not advance	Bye	Kebispayev (KAZ); W 3–0 ^{PO}	Bayramov (AZE); W 3–1 ^{PP}	3rd place, bronze medalist(s)

Women's freestyle

Athlete	Event	Qualification	Round of 16	Quarterfinal	Semifinal	Repechage 1	Repechage 2	Final / BM	
Athlete	Event	Opposition Result	Opposition Result	Opposition Result	Opposition Result	Opposition Result	Opposition Result	Opposition Result	Rank
Signe Marie Store	−69 kg	Bye	Fransson (SWE); L 0−3 ^{PO}	Did not advance					18

== See also ==
- Norway at the 2016 Summer Paralympics
