= 2016 European Taekwondo Olympic Qualification Tournament =

The 2016 European Qualification Tournament for Rio Olympic Games was held in Istanbul, Turkey from January 16 to January 17, 2016. Each country may enter maximum 2 male and 2 female divisions with only one in each division and the first two ranked athletes per weight division qualify their NOCs a place each for Olympic Games.

== Qualification summary ==
NOC	Men				Women				Total
NOC	−58kg	−68kg	−80kg	+80kg	−49kg	−57kg	−67kg	+67kg	Total
Azerbaijan			X		X		X		3
Belarus				X					1
Croatia		X							1
Finland						X			1
Germany							X		1
Great Britain				X					1
Israel	X								1
Netherlands								X	1
Norway								X	1
Poland		X	X						2
Refugee Olympic Team						X			1
Serbia					X				1
Spain	X								1
Total: 13 NOCs	2	2	2	2	2	2	2	2	16

== Men ==
=== −58 kg ===
16 January

Round of 16
Haykaz Samvelyan (ARM)	2
Meisam Rafiei (ISL)	4
Georgios Simitsis (GRE)	3
Bogdan Bodnar (UKR)	6
Toni Lahtinen (FIN)	1
Miloš Gladović (SRB)	9
Stepan Dimitrov (MDA)	6
Lovre Brečić (CRO)	5
Egers Aliu (ALB)	5
Jack Woolley (IRL)	15
Ron Atias (ISR)	10
Fredrik Lindström (SWE)	7
Badri Paksashvili (GEO)	0
Dylan Chellamootoo (FRA)	4

Quarterfinals
Jesús Tortosa (ESP)	1
Meisam Rafiei (ISL)	1
Bogdan Bodnar (UKR)	0
Miloš Gladović (SRB)	1
Stepan Dimitrov (MDA)	7
Jack Woolley (IRL)	10
Ron Atias (ISR)	6
Dylan Chellamootoo (FRA)	5

Semifinals
Jesús Tortosa (ESP)	4
Miloš Gladović (SRB)	3
Jack Woolley (IRL)	10
Ron Atias (ISR)	12

Final
Jesús Tortosa (ESP)	2
Ron Atias (ISR)	3

=== −68 kg ===
16 January

Round of 32
Emil Sørensen (DEN)	6–1	Boris Lieskovský (SVK)
Viktor Jankovský (CZE)	13–1	Meelis Nurmekan (EST)
Boris Ruiz (AND)	5–3	Rafik Zohri (NED)
Deniss Kulibiks (LAT)	7–17	Merab Shukakidze (GEO)
Aurimas Klemas (LTU)	4–2	Ledian Cekaj (ALB)
Mohammed Qatanani (SWE)	11–2	Butrint Ejupi (KOS)
Michele Ceccaroni (SMR)	0–9	Damir Fejzić (SRB)
Balša Radunović (MNE)	11–12	Conor Grassick (IRL)
Robert Amzoiu (ROU)	5–8	Emir Kaljanac (BIH)

Round of 16
Karol Robak (POL)	13
Emil Sørensen (DEN)	1
Viktor Jankovský (CZE)	1
Boris Ruiz (AND)	3
Jure Pantar (SLO)	4
Merab Shukakidze (GEO)	2
Aurimas Klemas (LTU)	7
Vladimir Dalakliev (BUL)	6
Ioannis Pilavakis (CYP)	4
Mohammed Qatanani (SWE)	3
Damir Fejzić (SRB)	3
Enes Acikel (AUT)	0
Ilan Braginski (ISR)	2
Conor Grassick (IRL)	1
Emir Kaljanac (BIH)	3
Filip Grgić (CRO)	6

Quarterfinals
Karol Robak (POL)	16
Boris Ruiz (AND)	3
Jure Pantar (SLO)	11
Aurimas Klemas (LTU)	9
Ioannis Pilavakis (CYP)	5
Damir Fejzić (SRB)	7
Ilan Braginski (ISR)	6
Filip Grgić (CRO)	7

Semifinals
Karol Robak (POL)	16
Jure Pantar (SLO)	6
Damir Fejzić (SRB)	9
Filip Grgić (CRO)	16

Final
Karol Robak (POL)	22
Filip Grgić (CRO)	7

=== −80 kg ===
17 January

Round of 32
Artūras Kuzmenka (LTU)	15–3	Davide Borgagni (SMR)

Round of 16
Júlio Ferreira (POR)	12
Artūras Kuzmenka (LTU)	0
Serhiy Chaika (UKR)	2
Richard Ordemann (NOR)	3
Roberto Botta (ITA)	10
Björn Þorleifsson (ISL)	5
Abderrahim El-Idrissi (DEN)	0
Piotr Paziński (POL)	7
Milad Beigi (AZE)	16
Jānis Cauņa (LAT)	0
David Sajko (SVK)	4
Arman Yeremyan (ARM)	5
Teodor Georgiev (BUL)	2
Uladzislau Saulukou (BLR)	3
Jorge González (AND)	5
Yunus Sarı (TUR)	7

Quarterfinals
Júlio Ferreira (POR)	3
Richard Ordemann (NOR)	4
Roberto Botta (ITA)	1
Piotr Paziński (POL)	1
Milad Beigi (AZE)	11
Arman Yeremyan (ARM)	1
Uladzislau Saulukou (BLR)	3
Yunus Sarı (TUR)	7

Semifinals
Richard Ordemann (NOR)	3
Piotr Paziński (POL)	9
Milad Beigi (AZE)	10
Yunus Sarı (TUR)	1

Final
Piotr Paziński (POL)	2
Milad Beigi (AZE)	14

=== +80 kg ===
17 January

Round of 16
Christoph Decker (AUT)	0
Teemu Heino (FIN)	0
Jeroen Wanrooij (NED)	9
Mehdi Rast Boud (ROT)	0
Mohammed El-Hatri (NOR)	5
Carlo Molfetta (ITA)	6
Armin Gredić (BIH)	2
Konstantinos Gkoltsios (GRE)	4
Claudiu Roseanu (ROU)	2
Andreas Stylianou (CYP)	10

Quarterfinals
Mahama Cho (GBR)	4
Teemu Heino (FIN)	2
Jeroen Wanrooij (NED)	0
Carlo Molfetta (ITA)	6
Ivan Trajkovič (SLO)	3
Konstantinos Gkoltsios (GRE)	2
Andreas Stylianou (CYP)	1
Arman-Marshall Silla (BLR)	13

Semifinals
Mahama Cho (GBR)	11
Carlo Molfetta (ITA)	3
Ivan Trajkovič (SLO)	5
Arman-Marshall Silla (BLR)	7

Final
Mahama Cho (GBR)	4
Arman-Marshall Silla (BLR)	2

== Women ==
=== −49 kg ===
17 January

Round of 32
Klaudija Tvaronavičiūtė (LTU)	3–1	Marina Ungureanu (MDA)

Round of 16
Iryna Romoldanova (UKR)	1
Klaudija Tvaronavičiūtė (LTU)	0
Charlotte Bjelke (DEN)	1
Anneleen Goffin (BEL)	0
Ioanna Koutsou (GRE)	11
Gabrijela Dimitraskovic (AUT)	3
Dina Pouryounes (ROT)	1
Patimat Abakarova (AZE)	4
Tijana Bogdanović (SRB)	4
Nikol Chorbanova (BUL)	2
Yarden Sharabi (ISR)	1
Ivett Gonda (HUN)	7
Erica Nicoli (ITA)	14
Anouk Doria (MON)	1
Marta Kiigemägi (EST)	0
Kyriaki Kouttouki (CYP)	12

Quarterfinals
Iryna Romoldanova (UKR)	2
Charlotte Bjelke (DEN)	1
Ioanna Koutsou (GRE)	1
Patimat Abakarova (AZE)	5
Tijana Bogdanović (SRB)	3
Ivett Gonda (HUN)	2
Erica Nicoli (ITA)	4
Kyriaki Kouttouki (CYP)	3

Semifinals
Iryna Romoldanova (UKR)	1
Patimat Abakarova (AZE)	3
Tijana Bogdanović (SRB)	11
Erica Nicoli (ITA)	4

Final
Patimat Abakarova (AZE)	6
Tijana Bogdanović (SRB)	5

=== −57 kg ===
17 January

Round of 32
Teodora Mitrović (MNE)	2–1	Gabriela Bohušová (SVK)
Sarah Malykke (DEN)	0–5	Marie Magnus (NOR)
Bianca Biricz (AUT)	0–8	Indra Craen (BEL)

Round of 16
Anna-Lena Frömming (GER)	2
Teodora Mitrović (MNE)	1
Andriana Asprogeraka (GRE)	5
Bat-El Gatterer (ISR)	2
Joana Cunha (POR)	0
Mariana Mihaila (ROU)	0
Licia Martignani (ITA)	7
Suvi Mikkonen (FIN)	8
Edina Kotsis (HUN)	0
Marie Magnus (NOR)	7
Ada Demneri (ALB)	0
Despina Pilavaki (CYP)	0
Raheleh Asemani (ROT)	5
Darya Zubovich (BLR)	1
Indra Craen (BEL)	11
Manuela Bezzola (SUI)	1

Quarterfinals
Anna-Lena Frömming (GER)	1
Andriana Asprogeraka (GRE)	0
Joana Cunha (POR)	2
Suvi Mikkonen (FIN)	4
Marie Magnus (NOR)	0
Despina Pilavaki (CYP)	0
Raheleh Asemani (ROT)	9
Indra Craen (BEL)	1

Semifinals
Anna-Lena Frömming (GER)	8
Suvi Mikkonen (FIN)	9
Marie Magnus (NOR)	0
Raheleh Asemani (ROT)	1

Final
Suvi Mikkonen (FIN)	4
Raheleh Asemani (ROT)	7

=== −67 kg ===
16 January

Round of 32
Petra Matijašević (MKD)	9–0	Izabel Warzhapetian (ARM)

Round of 16
Farida Azizova (AZE)	4
Petra Matijašević (MKD)	1
Tetiana Tetereviatnykova (UKR)	1
Viktoryia Belanouskaya (BLR)	0
Franka Anić (SLO)	0
Gerda Gaižauskaitė (LTU)	0
Izabella Bajko (ROU)	0
Marta Calvo (ESP)	9
Rabia Gülec (GER)	14
Kristín Björg Hrólfsdóttir (ISL)	0
Jenna Partanen (FIN)	0
Aleksandra Krzemieniecka (POL)	1
Joyce van Baaren (NED)	2
Iveta Jiránková (CZE)	1
Ana Ciuchitu (MDA)	7
Nina Kläy (SUI)	1

Quarterfinals
Farida Azizova (AZE)	3
Tetiana Tetereviatnykova (UKR)	0
Franka Anić (SLO)	1
Marta Calvo (ESP)	1
Rabia Gülec (GER)	5
Aleksandra Krzemieniecka (POL)	4
Joyce van Baaren (NED)	1
Ana Ciuchitu (MDA)	1

Semifinals
Farida Azizova (AZE)	0
Franka Anić (SLO)	0
Rabia Gülec (GER)	5
Ana Ciuchitu (MDA)	3

Final
Farida Azizova (AZE)	1
Rabia Gülec (GER)	0

=== +67 kg ===
16 January

Quarterfinals		Semifinals		Final
		Reshmie Oogink (NED)	7
Nuša Rajher (SLO)	5	Nuša Rajher (SLO)	1
Aleksandra Kowalczuk (POL)	2			Reshmie Oogink (NED)	1
Nafia Kuş (TUR)	0			Tina Røe Skaar (NOR)	4
Tina Røe Skaar (NOR)	6	Tina Røe Skaar (NOR)	1
Anđela Popović (MNE)	0	Olga Ivanova (RUS)	0
Olga Ivanova (RUS)	3
