= Rowing at the 2016 Summer Olympics – Men's double sculls =

Men's double sculls at the Games of the XXXI Olympiad
- Venue: Rodrigo de Freitas Lagoon
- Date: 6–11 August 2016
- Competitors: 26 from 13 nations
- Teams: 13
- Winning time: 6:50.28

Medalists
1st place, gold medalist(s)		Martin Sinković; Valent Sinković	Croatia
2nd place, silver medalist(s)		Mindaugas Griškonis; Saulius Ritter	Lithuania
3rd place, bronze medalist(s)		Kjetil Borch; Olaf Tufte	Norway

The men's double sculls competition at the 2016 Summer Olympics in Rio de Janeiro was held from 6 to 11 August at the Lagoon Rodrigo de Freitas.

The medals for the competition were presented by Gerhard Heiberg, Norway, member of the International Olympic Committee, and the gifts were presented by Mike Tanner, Hong Kong, member of the executive committee of the International Rowing Federation.

== Results ==
=== Heats ===
First three of each heat qualify to the semifinals, remainder goes to the repechage.

==== Heat 1 ====
Rank	Rower	Country	Time	Notes
1	Robbie Manson; Chris Harris	New Zealand	6:40.35	SA/B
2	Aleksandar Aleksandrov; Boris Yotov	Azerbaijan	6:40.52	SA/B
3	Francesco Fossi; Romano Battisti	Italy	6:42.33	SA/B
4	Jonathan Walton; John Collins	Great Britain	6:43.93	R
5	Eduardo Rubio; Adrián Oquendo	Cuba	6:52.20	R

==== Heat 2 ====
Rank	Rower	Country	Time	Notes
1	Mindaugas Griškonis; Saulius Ritter	Lithuania	6:29.11	SA/B
2	Kjetil Borch; Olaf Tufte	Norway	6:30.58	SA/B
3	Marcel Hacker; Stephan Krüger	Germany	6:31.85	SA/B
4	Georgi Bozhilov; Kristian Vasilev	Bulgaria	6:44.31	R

==== Heat 3 ====
Rank	Rower	Country	Time	Notes
1	Martin Sinković; Valent Sinković	Croatia	6:30.09	SA/B
2	Hugo Boucheron; Matthieu Androdias	France	6:33.03	SA/B
3	David Watts; Chris Morgan	Australia	6:36.39	SA/B
4	Marko Marjanovic; Andrija Sljukic	Serbia	7:07.29	R

=== Repechage ===
The first three of the repechage qualify to the semifinals

Rank	Rower	Country	Time	Notes
1	Jonathan Walton; John Collins	Great Britain	6:19.60	SA/B
2	Georgi Bozhilov; Kristian Vasilev	Bulgaria	6:20.56	SA/B
3	Marko Marjanovic; Andrija Sljukic	Serbia	6:20.62	SA/B
4	Eduardo Rubio; Adrián Oquendo	Cuba	6:21.52	

=== Semifinals ===
First three of each heat qualify to the Final A, remainder goes to the Final B.

==== Semifinal 1 ====
Rank	Rower	Country	Time	Notes
1	Martin Sinković; Valent Sinković	Croatia	6:12.27	FA
2	Kjetil Borch; Olaf Tufte	Norway	6:13.50	FA
3	Jonathan Walton; John Collins	Great Britain	6:13.83	FA
4	Robbie Manson; Chris Harris	New Zealand	6:17.01	FB
5	David Watts; Chris Morgan	Australia	6:19.36	FB
6	Georgi Bozhilov; Kristian Vasilev	Bulgaria	6:47.00	FB

==== Semifinal 2 ====
Rank	Rower	Country	Time	Notes
1	Mindaugas Griškonis; Saulius Ritter	Lithuania	6:14.61	FA
2	Francesco Fossi; Romano Battisti	Italy	6:15.24	FA
3	Hugo Boucheron; Matthieu Androdias	France	6:16.15	FA
4	Marcel Hacker; Stephan Krüger	Germany	6:18.32	FB
5	Marko Marjanovic; Andrija Sljukic	Serbia	6:27.66	FB
6	Aleksandar Aleksandrov; Boris Yotov	Azerbaijan	6:37.49	FB

=== Finals ===
==== Final B ====
Rank	Rower	Country	Time	Notes
1	David Watts; Chris Morgan	Australia	6:58.11	
2	Marcel Hacker; Stephan Krüger	Germany	6:58.86	
3	Georgi Bozhilov; Kristian Vasilev	Bulgaria	7:00.85	
4	Marko Marjanovic; Andrija Sljukic	Serbia	7:03.13	
5	Robbie Manson; Chris Harris	New Zealand	7:06.80	
6	Aleksandar Aleksandrov; Boris Yotov	Azerbaijan	7:24.03	

==== Final A ====
Rank	Rower	Country	Time	Notes
1st place, gold medalist(s)	Martin Sinković; Valent Sinković	Croatia	6:50.28	
2nd place, silver medalist(s)	Mindaugas Griškonis; Saulius Ritter	Lithuania	6:51.39	
3rd place, bronze medalist(s)	Kjetil Borch; Olaf Tufte	Norway	6:53.25	
4	Francesco Fossi; Romano Battisti	Italy	6:57.10	
5	Jonathan Walton; John Collins	Great Britain	7:01.25	
6	Hugo Boucheron; Matthieu Androdias	France	7:02.06	
