= Georgi Bozhilov (rower) =

Bulgarian rower

Personal information
- Born: 9 April 1989 (age 37)

Sport
- Sport: Rowing

Georgi Bozhilov (Bulgarian: Георги Божилов, born 9 April 1989) is a Bulgarian rower. He competed in the men's double sculls event at the 2016 Summer Olympics.
