= Andrija Šljukić =

Serbian rower

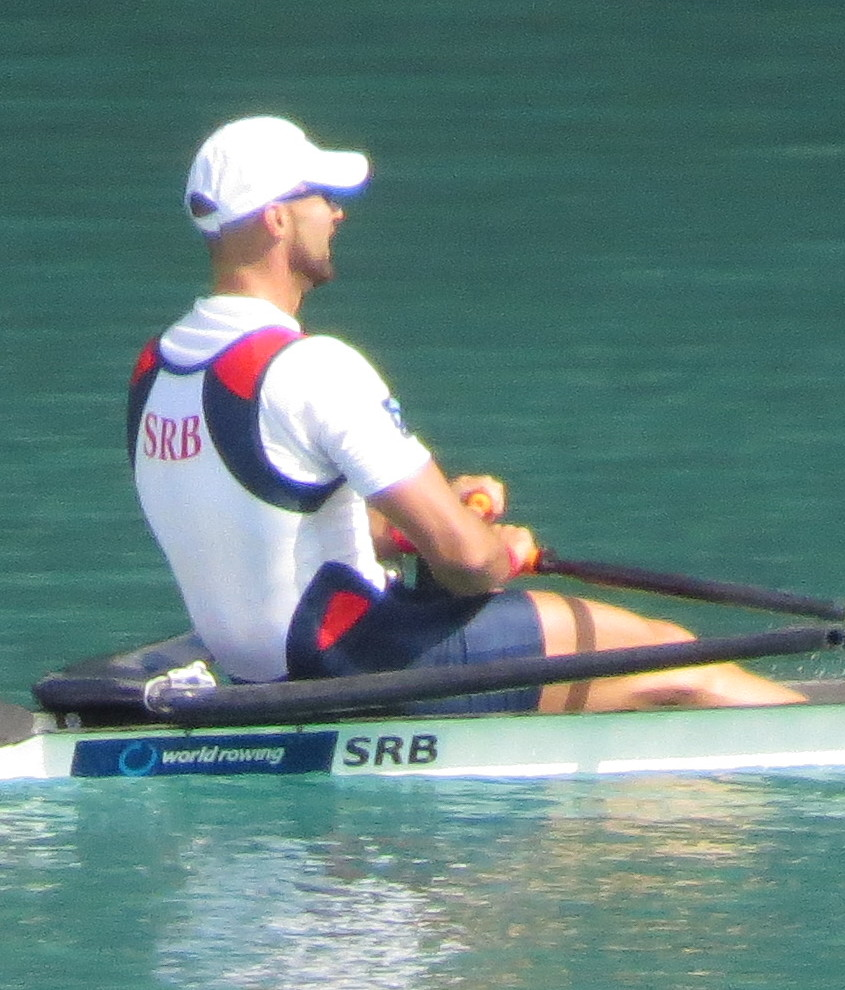
- Šljukić at the 2015 World Cup

Personal information
- Nationality: Serbia
- Born: 8 September 1995 (age 30) Belgrade, FR Yugoslavia

Sport
- Sport: Rowing
Medal record
World U23 Championships
| Silver medal – second place | 2015 Plovdiv | Single sculls |

Andrija Šljukić (Serbian Cyrillic: Андрија Шљукић; born 8 September 1995) was a Serbian rower.

He competed at the 2016 Summer Olympics in Rio de Janeiro, in the men's double sculls.
