= 2023 World Rowing Championships – Women's coxless four =

Women's coxless four at the 2023 World Rowing Championships
- Venue: Lake Sava
- Location: Belgrade, Serbia
- Dates: 4 September – 9 September
- Competitors: 56 from 14 nations
- Winning time: 6:41.82

Medalists
gold medal	Marloes Oldenburg; Hermijntje Drenth; Tinka Offereins; Benthe Boonstra	Netherlands
silver medal	Mădălina Bereș; Maria Tivodariu; Magdalena Rusu; Amalia Bereș	Romania
bronze medal	Heidi Long; Rowan McKellar; Helen Glover; Rebecca Shorten	Great Britain

The women's coxless four competition at the 2023 World Rowing Championships took place at Lake Sava, in Belgrade.

== Schedule ==
The schedule was as follows:

Date	Time	Round
Monday 4 September 2023	10:54	Heats
Tuesday 5 September 2023	12:08	Repechages
Thursday 7 September 2023	10:55	Semifinals A/B
Saturday 9 September 2023	10:26	Final C
Saturday 9 September 2023	11:50	Final B
Saturday 9 September 2023	14:39	Final A

All times are Central European Summer Time (UTC+2)

== Results ==
=== Heats ===
The fastest three boats in each heat advanced directly to the AB semifinals. The remaining boats were sent to the repechages.

==== Heat 1 ====
Rank	Rower	Country	Time	Notes
1	Marloes Oldenburg; Hermijntje Drenth; Tinka Offereins; Benthe Boonstra	Netherlands	6:38.45	SA/B
2	Molly Bruggeman; Kelsey Reelick; Madeleine Wanamaker; Claire Collins	United States	6:40.65	SA/B
3	Julie Poulsen; Marie Johannesen; Frida Sanggaard Nielsen; Astrid Steensberg	Denmark	6:43.03	SA/B
4	Piper Battersby; Rebecca Zimmerman; Kristen Siermachesky; Kristina Walker	Canada	6:45.71	R
5	Iria Jarama; Izaskun Echaniz; María Fernanda Núñez; Olivia Del Castillo	Spain	7:10.65	R

==== Heat 2 ====
Rank	Rower	Country	Time	Notes
1	Heidi Long; Rowan McKellar; Helen Glover; Rebecca Shorten	Great Britain	6:39.50	SA/B
2	Giorgia Patten; Katrina Werry; Sarah Hawe; Lucy Stephan	Australia	6:43.52	SA/B
3	Natalie Long; Sanita Pušpure; Imogen Magner; Eimear Lambe	Ireland	6:47.99	SA/B
4	Sophie Leupold; Lena Osterkamp; Melanie Göldner; Luisa Schade	Germany	6:52.06	R
5	Mildred Mercado Palacios; Davanih Plata Alvarado; Lilian Armenta Ayub; Maite Arrillaga Garay	Mexico	6:57.69	R

==== Heat 3 ====
Rank	Rower	Country	Time	Notes
1	Mădălina Bereș; Maria Tivodariu; Magdalena Rusu; Amalia Bereș	Romania	6:40.40	SA/B
2	Zhang Shuxian; Liu Xiaoxin; Wang Zifeng; Xu Xingye	China	6:44.67	SA/B
3	Davina Waddy; Ella Cossill; Jackie Gowler; Phoebe Spoors	New Zealand	6:47.23	SA/B
4	Olga Michałkiewicz; Zuzanna Lesner; Weronika Kazmierczak; Joanna Dittmann	Poland	6:58.67	R

=== Repechages ===
The three fastest boats in each repechage advanced to the AB semifinals. The remaining boats were sent to the C final.

Rank	Rower	Country	Time	Notes
1	Piper Battersby; Rebecca Zimmerman; Kristen Siermachesky; Kristina Walker	Canada	6:36.83	SA/B
2	Sophie Leupold; Lena Osterkamp; Melanie Göldner; Luisa Schade	Germany	6:38.80	SA/B
3	Olga Michałkiewicz; Zuzanna Lesner; Weronika Kazmierczak; Joanna Dittmann	Poland	6:39.11	SA/B
4	Iria Jarama; Izaskun Echaniz; María Fernanda Núñez; Olivia Del Castillo	Spain	6:41.27	FC
5	Mildred Mercado Palacios; Davanih Plata Alvarado; Lilian Armenta Ayub; Maite Arrillaga Garay	Mexico	6:48.99	FC

=== Semifinals A/B ===
The three fastest boats in each Semifinal advanced to the A final. The remaining boats were sent to the B final.

==== Semifinal 1 ====
Rank	Rower	Country	Time	Notes
1	Marloes Oldenburg; Hermijntje Drenth; Tinka Offereins; Benthe Boonstra	Netherlands	6:52.72	FA
2	Mădălina Bereș; Maria Tivodariu; Magdalena Rusu; Amalia Bereș	Romania	6:53.98	FA
3	Giorgia Patten; Katrina Werry; Sarah Hawe; Lucy Stephan	Australia	7:05.02	FA
4	Davina Waddy; Ella Cossill; Jackie Gowler; Phoebe Spoors	New Zealand	7:09.93	FB
5	Olga Michałkiewicz; Zuzanna Lesner; Weronika Kazmierczak; Joanna Dittmann	Poland	7:20.10	FB
6	Sophie Leupold; Lena Osterkamp; Melanie Göldner; Luisa Schade	Germany	7:27.84	FB

==== Semifinal 2 ====
Rank	Rower	Country	Time	Notes
1	Heidi Long; Rowan McKellar; Helen Glover; Rebecca Shorten	Great Britain	7:06.29	FA
2	Molly Bruggeman; Kelsey Reelick; Madeleine Wanamaker; Claire Collins	United States	7:11.66	FA
3	Zhang Shuxian; Liu Xiaoxin; Wang Zifeng; Xu Xingye	China	7:13.62	FA
4	Julie Poulsen; Marie Johannesen; Frida Sanggaard Nielsen; Astrid Steensberg	Denmark	7:16.74	FB
5	Natalie Long; Sanita Pušpure; Imogen Magner; Eimear Lambe	Ireland	7:19.45	FB
6	Piper Battersby; Rebecca Zimmerman; Kristen Siermachesky; Kristina Walker	Canada	7:23.13	FB

=== Finals ===
The A final determined the rankings for places 1 to 6. Additional rankings were determined in the other finals.

==== Final C ====
Rank	Rower	Country	Time	Total rank
1	Iria Jarama; Izaskun Echaniz; María Fernanda Núñez; Olivia Del Castillo	Spain	6:46.67	13
2	Mildred Mercado Palacios; Davanih Plata Alvarado; Lilian Armenta Ayub; Maite Arrillaga Garay	Mexico	6:53.50	14

==== Final B ====
Rank	Rower	Country	Time	Total rank
1	Davina Waddy; Ella Cossill; Jackie Gowler; Phoebe Spoors	New Zealand	6:40.62	7
2	Julie Poulsen; Marie Johannesen; Frida Sanggaard Nielsen; Astrid Steensberg	Denmark	6:42.16	8
3	Natalie Long; Sanita Pušpure; Imogen Magner; Eimear Lambe	Ireland	6:43.86	9
4	Piper Battersby; Rebecca Zimmerman; Kristen Siermachesky; Kristina Walker	Canada	6:45.01	10
5	Sophie Leupold; Lena Osterkamp; Melanie Göldner; Luisa Schade	Germany	6:52.14	11
6	Olga Michałkiewicz; Zuzanna Lesner; Weronika Kazmierczak; Joanna Dittmann	Poland	6:52.65	12

==== Final A ====
Rank	Rower	Country	Time
1st place, gold medalist(s)	Marloes Oldenburg; Hermijntje Drenth; Tinka Offereins; Benthe Boonstra	Netherlands	6:41.82
2nd place, silver medalist(s)	Mădălina Bereș; Maria Tivodariu; Magdalena Rusu; Amalia Bereș	Romania	6:43.29
3rd place, bronze medalist(s)	Heidi Long; Rowan McKellar; Helen Glover; Rebecca Shorten	Great Britain	6:44.31
4	Molly Bruggeman; Kelsey Reelick; Madeleine Wanamaker; Claire Collins	United States	6:47.39
5	Giorgia Patten; Katrina Werry; Sarah Hawe; Lucy Stephan	Australia	6:48.23
6	Zhang Shuxian; Liu Xiaoxin; Wang Zifeng; Xu Xingye	China	6:49.81
