= Rowing at the 2024 Summer Olympics – Women's coxless four =

Women's coxless four at the Games of the XXXIII Olympiad
- Olympic rowing
- Venue: Stade nautique de Vaires-sur-Marne
- Dates: 28 July – 1 August 2024
- Competitors: 36 from 9 nations

Medalists
| 1st place, gold medalist(s) | | Benthe Boonstra; Hermijntje Drenth; Tinka Offereins; Marloes Oldenburg | Netherlands |
| 2nd place, silver medalist(s) | | Esme Booth; Helen Glover; Sam Redgrave; Rebecca Shorten | Great Britain |
| 3rd place, bronze medalist(s) | | Jackie Gowler; Davina Waddy; Kerri Williams; Phoebe Spoors | New Zealand |

The women's coxless four event at the 2024 Summer Olympics took place from 28 July to 1 August 2024 at the Stade nautique de Vaires-sur-Marne. 36 rowers from 9 nations competed.

== Schedule ==
All times are Central European Time (UTC+2)

| Date | Time | Round |
|---|---|---|
| Sunday, 28 July 2024 | 12:30 | Heats |
| Tuesday, 30 July 2024 | 11:30 | Repechage |
| Thursday, 1 August 2024 | 10:54 | Final |

== Rowers per team ==
| Number | Rowers | Nation |
|---|---|---|
| 1 | Olympia Aldersey; Jean Mitchell; Lily Alton-Triggs; Molly Goodman | Australia |
| 2 | Zhang Shuxian; Liu Xiaoxin; Wang Zifeng; Xu Xingye | China |
| 3 | Esme Booth; Helen Glover; Sam Redgrave; Rebecca Shorten | Great Britain |
| 4 | Emily Hegarty; Eimear Lambe; Natalie Long; Imogen Magner | Ireland |
| 5 | Benthe Boonstra; Hermijntje Drenth; Tinka Offereins; Marloes Oldenburg | Netherlands |
| 6 | Adriana Adam; Amalia Bereș; Maria Lehaci; Maria-Magdalena Rusu | Romania |
| 7 | Jackie Gowler; Davina Waddy; Kerri Williams; Phoebe Spoors | New Zealand |
| 8 | Astrid Steensberg; Frida Sanggaard Nielsen; Marie Skytte Hauberg Johannesen; Julie Poulsen | Denmark |
| 9 | Emily Kallfelz; Kaitlin Knifton; Mary Mazzio-Manson; Kelsey Reelick | United States |

== Results ==
=== Heats ===
The first two of each heat qualify for Final A, while the remainder go to the repechage phase in a second bid to qualify for the final.

==== Heat 1 ====
| Rank | Lane | Nation | Time | Notes |
|---|---|---|---|---|
| 1 | 2 | Great Britain | 6:42.57 | FA |
| 2 | 4 | New Zealand | 6:45.44 | FA |
| 3 | 5 | China | 6:49.12 | R |
| 4 | 1 | United States | 6:49.66 | R |
| 5 | 3 | Denmark | 6:56.70 | R |

==== Heat 2 ====
| Rank | Lane | Nation | Time | Notes |
|---|---|---|---|---|
| 1 | 4 | Netherlands | 6:43.71 | FA |
| 2 | 2 | Romania | 6:44.55 | FA |
| 3 | 1 | Ireland | 6:51.75 | R |
| 4 | 3 | Australia | 6:59.86 | R |

=== Repechage ===
The first two in repechage heat qualify for Final A and rest go to Final B.

==== Repechage Heat ====
| Rank | Lane | Nation | Time | Notes |
|---|---|---|---|---|
| 1 | 2 | United States | 6:32.48 | FA |
| 2 | 4 | China | 6:33.60 | FA |
| 3 | 1 | Denmark | 6:35.65 | FB |
| 4 | 3 | Ireland | 6:38.10 | FB |
| 5 | 5 | Australia | 6:43.70 | FB |

=== Finals ===
==== Final A ====
| Rank | Lane | Nation | Time | Notes |
|---|---|---|---|---|
| 1st place, gold medalist(s) | 4 | Netherlands | 6:27.13 | |
| 2nd place, silver medalist(s) | 3 | Great Britain | 6:27.31 | |
| 3rd place, bronze medalist(s) | 2 | New Zealand | 6:29.08 | |
| 4 | 5 | Romania | 6:29.52 | |
| 5 | 6 | United States | 6:34.88 | |
| 6 | 1 | China | 6:36.18 | |

==== Final B ====
| Rank | Lane | Nation | Time | Notes |
|---|---|---|---|---|
| 7 | 1 | Ireland | 6:34.74 | |
| 8 | 2 | Denmark | 6:36.43 | |
| 9 | 3 | Australia | 6:39.28 | |
