= 2022 World Rowing Championships – Women's eight =

Women's eight at the 2022 World Rowing Championships
- Venue: Labe aréna
- Location: Račice, Czech Republic
- Dates: 20 September – 25 September
- Competitors: 55 from 6 nations
- Winning time: 6:01.14

Medalists
gold medal	Maria-Magdalena Rusu; Iuliana Buhus; Adriana Ailincai; Maria Tivodariu; Madalina Beres; Amalia Beres; Ioana Vrinceanu; Simona Radiș; Victoria-Ștefania Petreanu	Romania
silver medal	Benthe Boonstra; Laila Youssifou; Hermine Catherine Drenth; Marloes Oldenburg; Roos de Jong; Tinka Offereins; Ymkje Clevering; Veronique Meester; Aniek van Veenen	Netherlands
bronze medal	Jessica Sevick; Gabrielle Smith; Morgan Rosts; Kirsten Edwards; Alexis Cronk; Kasia Gruchalla-Wesierski; Avalon Wasteneys; Sydney Payne; Kristen Kit	Canada

The women's eight competition at the 2022 World Rowing Championships took place at the Račice regatta venue.

== Schedule ==
The schedule was as follows:

Date	Time	Round
Tuesday 20 September 2022	13:08	Heats
Sunday 25 September 2022	14:59	Final A

All times are Central European Summer Time (UTC+2)

== Results ==
=== Preliminary race ===
All boats advanced directly to Final A.

Rank	Rower	Country	Time	Notes
1	Bruggeman, Reelick, Hagstrom, Salmons, Thoennes, Buck, Wanamaker, Collins, Broadland	United States	6:10.91	FA
2	Sevick, Smith, Rosts, Edwards, Cronk, Gruchalla-Wesierski, Wasteneys, Payne, Kit	Canada	6:12.72	FA
3	Boonstra, Youssifou, Drenth, Oldenburg, De Jong, Offereins, Clevering, Meester, Van Veenen	Netherlands	6:15.68	FA
4	Price, Mitchell, Barr, Swick, Bramwell, Patten, Rowe, Fessey, Barnet-Hepples	Australia	6:16.81	FA
5	Rusu, Buhus, Ailincai, Tivodariu, Beres, Beres, Vrinceanu, Tilvescu, Petreanu	Romania	6:17.39	FA
6	Zhang, Zhou, Dong, Dai, Peixin, Sun, Lin, Yang, Shang	China	6:28.04	FA

=== Final A ===
The final determined the rankings

Rank	Rower	Country	Time	Notes
1st place, gold medalist(s)	Rusu, Buhus, Ailincai, Tivodariu, M. Beres, A. Beres, Vrinceanu, Radiș, Petreanu	Romania	6:01.14	
2nd place, silver medalist(s)	Boonstra, Youssifou, Drenth, Oldenburg, De Jong, Offereins, Clevering, Meester, Van Veenen	Netherlands	6:05.04	
3rd place, bronze medalist(s)	Sevick, Smith, Rosts, Edwards, Cronk, Gruchalla-Wesierski, Wasteneys, Payne, Kit	Canada	6:07.51	
4	Bruggeman, Reelick, Hagstrom, Salmons, Thoennes, Buck, Wanamaker, Collins, Broadland	United States	6:09.80	
5	Price, Mitchell, Barr, Swick, Bramwell, Patten, Rowe, Fessey, Barnet-Hepples	Australia	6:19.97	
6	Zhang, Zhou, Dong, Dai, Peixin, Sun, Lin, Yang, Shang	China	6:21.94	
