= 2022 World Rowing Championships – Women's coxless pair =

Women's coxless pair at the 2022 World Rowing Championships
- Venue: Labe aréna
- Location: Račice, Czech Republic
- Dates: 18 September – 24 September
- Competitors: 30 from 15 nations
- Winning time: 7:03.76

Medalists
| gold medal | Grace Prendergast; Kerri Williams | New Zealand |
| silver medal | Ymkje Clevering; Veronique Meester | Netherlands |
| bronze medal | Madeleine Wanamaker; Claire Collins | United States |

The women's coxless pair competition at the 2022 World Rowing Championships took place at the Račice regatta venue.

== Schedule ==
The schedule was as follows:

| Date | Time | Round |
|---|---|---|
| Monday 19 September 2022 | 10:02 | Heats |
| Tuesday 20 September 2022 | 11:22 | Repechage |
| Thursday 22 September 2022 | 10:20 | Semifinals A/B |
| Saturday 24 September 2022 | 10:24 | Final C |
| Saturday 24 September 2022 | 11:48 | Final B |
| Saturday 24 September 2022 | 13:34 | Final A |

All times are Central European Summer Time (UTC+2)

== Results ==
=== Heats ===
The three fastest boats in each heat advanced directly to the semifinals A/B. The remaining boats were sent to the repechages.

==== Heat 1 ====
| Rank | Rower | Country | Time | Notes |
|---|---|---|---|---|
| 1 | Ymkje Clevering; Veronique Meester | Netherlands | 7:04.61 | SA/B |
| 2 | Emily Ford; Esme Booth | Great Britain | 7:07.58 | SA/B |
| 3 | Alice Codato; Linda De Filippis | Italy | 7:16.09 | SA/B |
| 4 | Georgie Gleeson; Eliza Gaffney | Australia | 7:21.39 | R |
| 5 | Lilian Armenta Ayub; Maite Arrillaga Garay | Mexico | 7:23.07 | R |

==== Heat 2 ====
| Rank | Rower | Country | Time | Notes |
|---|---|---|---|---|
| 1 | Ioana Vrinceanu; Denisa Tilvescu | Romania | 7:02.89 | SA/B |
| 2 | Madeleine Wanamaker; Claire Collins | United States | 7:03.98 | SA/B |
| 3 | Josipa Jurković; Ivana Jurković | Croatia | 7:08.57 | SA/B |
| 4 | Radka Novotniková; Pavlina Flamiková | Czech Republic | 7:11.70 | R |
| 5 | Aina Cid; Maria Valencia Nunez | Spain | 7:21.72 | R |

==== Heat 3 ====
| Rank | Rower | Country | Time | Notes |
|---|---|---|---|---|
| 1 | Grace Prendergast; Kerri Williams | New Zealand | 7:06.30 | SA/B |
| 2 | Natalie Long; Tara Hanlon | Ireland | 7:17.64 | SA/B |
| 3 | Rianne Boekhorst; Kristina Walker | Canada | 7:21.14 | SA/B |
| 4 | Sofie Vikkelsoe; Nikoline Laidlaw | Denmark | 7:24.27 | R |
| 5 | Zhang Yan; Wu Yihui | China | 7:35.73 | R |

=== Repechage ===
The three fastest boats advanced to the semifinals A/B. The remaining boats were sent to the Final C.

| Rank | Rower | Country | Time | Notes |
|---|---|---|---|---|
| 1 | Radka Novotniková; Pavlina Flamiková | Czech Republic | 7:15.30 | SA/B |
| 2 | Georgie Gleeson; Eliza Gaffney | Australia | 7:16.35 | SA/B |
| 3 | Aina Cid; Maria Valencia Nunez | Spain | 7:18.90 | SA/B |
| 4 | Sofie Vikkelsoe; Nikoline Laidlaw | Denmark | 7:20.68 | FC |
| 5 | Zhang Yan; Wu Yihui | China | 7:30.51 | FC |
| 6 | Lilian Armenta Ayub; Maite Arrillaga Garay | Mexico | 7:32.67 | FC |

=== Semifinals A/B ===
The three fastest boats in each semi advanced to the A final. The remaining boats were sent to the B final.

==== Semifinal 1 ====
| Rank | Rower | Country | Time | Notes |
|---|---|---|---|---|
| 1 | Ioana Vrinceanu; Denisa Tilvescu | Romania | 7:11.04 | FA |
| 2 | Ymkje Clevering; Veronique Meester | Netherlands | 7:12.75 | FA |
| 3 | Josipa Jurković; Ivana Jurković | Croatia | 7:16.61 | FA |
| 4 | Radka Novotniková; Pavlina Flamiková | Czech Republic | 7:19.49 | FB |
| 5 | Natalie Long; Tara Hanlon | Ireland | 7:21.21 | FB |
| 6 | Aina Cid; Maria Valencia Nunez | Spain | 7:35.24 | FB |

==== Semifinal 2 ====
| Rank | Rower | Country | Time | Notes |
|---|---|---|---|---|
| 1 | Grace Prendergast; Kerri Williams | New Zealand | 7:11.02 | FA |
| 2 | Madeleine Wanamaker; Claire Collins | United States | 7:15.09 | FA |
| 3 | Emily Ford; Esme Booth | Great Britain | 7:19.99 | FA |
| 4 | Georgie Gleeson; Eliza Gaffney | Australia | 7:26.99 | FB |
| 5 | Alice Codato; Linda De Filippis | Italy | 7:38.15 | FB |
| 6 | Rianne Boekhorst; Kristina Walker | Canada | 7:42.99 | FB |

=== Finals ===
The A final determined the rankings for places 1 to 6. Additional rankings were determined in the other finals

==== Final C ====
| Rank | Rower | Country | Time | Total rank |
|---|---|---|---|---|
| 1 | Sofie Vikkelsoe; Nikoline Laidlaw | Denmark | 7:34.19 | 13 |
| 2 | Lilian Armenta Ayub; Maite Arrillaga Garay | Mexico | 7:39.61 | 14 |
| 3 | Zhang Yan; Wu Yihui | China | 7:39.64 | 15 |

==== Final B ====
| Rank | Rower | Country | Time | Total rank |
|---|---|---|---|---|
| 1 | Radka Novotniková; Pavlina Flamiková | Czech Republic | 7:12.29 | 7 |
| 2 | Natalie Long; Tara Hanlon | Ireland | 7:12.84 | 8 |
| 3 | Georgie Gleeson; Eliza Gaffney | Australia | 7:14.90 | 9 |
| 4 | Aina Cid; Maria Valencia Nunez | Spain | 7:19.78 | 10 |
| 5 | Rianne Boekhorst; Kristina Walker | Canada | 7:20.67 | 11 |
| 6 | Alice Codato; Linda De Filippis | Italy | 7:28.56 | 12 |

==== Final A ====
| Rank | Rower | Country | Time | Notes |
|---|---|---|---|---|
| 1st place, gold medalist(s) | Grace Prendergast; Kerri Williams | New Zealand | 7:03.76 | |
| 2nd place, silver medalist(s) | Ymkje Clevering; Veronique Meester | Netherlands | 7:06.02 | |
| 3rd place, bronze medalist(s) | Madeleine Wanamaker; Claire Collins | United States | 7:08.03 | |
| 4 | Ioana Vrinceanu; Denisa Tilvescu | Romania | 7:09.38 | |
| 5 | Emily Ford; Esme Booth | Great Britain | 7:16.82 | |
| 6 | Josipa Jurković; Ivana Jurković | Croatia | 7:18.87 | |
