= 2022 World Rowing Championships – Women's coxless four =

Women's coxless four at the 2022 World Rowing Championships
- Venue: Labe aréna
- Location: Račice, Czech Republic
- Dates: 19 September – 24 September
- Competitors: 52 from 13 nations
- Winning time: 6:26.40

Medalists
gold medal	Heidi Long; Rowan McKellar; Samantha Redgrave; Rebecca Shorten	Great Britain
silver medal	Marloes Oldenburg; Benthe Boonstra; Hermijntje Drenth; Tinka Offereins	Netherlands
bronze medal	Lucy Stephan; Katrina Werry; Bronwyn Cox; Annabelle McIntyre	Australia

The women's coxless four competition at the 2022 World Rowing Championships took place at the Račice regatta venue.

== Schedule ==
The schedule was as follows:

Date	Time	Round
Monday 19 September 2022	11:41	Heats
Tuesday 20 September 2022	11:51	Repechage
Thursday 22 September 2022	11:45	Semifinals A/B
Saturday 24 September 2022	12:20	Final B
Saturday 24 September 2022	14:39	Final A

All times are Central European Summer Time (UTC+2)

== Results ==
=== Heats ===
The three fastest boats in each heat advanced directly to the semifinals A/B. The remaining boats were sent to the repechages.

==== Heat 1 ====
Rank	Rower	Country	Time	Notes
1	Heidi Long; Rowan McKellar; Samantha Redgrave; Rebecca Shorten	Great Britain	6:29.44	SA/B
2	Marloes Oldenburg; Benthe Boonstra; Hermijntje Drenth; Tinka Offereins	Netherlands	6:31.75	SA/B
3	Julie Poulsen; Marie Johannesen; Frida Sanggaard Nielsen; Astrid Steensberg	Denmark	6:33.39	SA/B
4	Emma Cornelis; Adele Brosse; Julie Voirin; Maya Cornut	France	6:37.01	R
5	Victoria Opitz; Teal Cohen; Erin Boxberger; Allyson Baker	United States	6:39.60	R

==== Heat 2 ====
Rank	Rower	Country	Time	Notes
1	Aifric Keogh; Eimear Lambe; Fiona Murtagh; Emily Hegarty	Ireland	6:27.59	SA/B
2	Mădălina Bereș; Amalia Bereș; Magdalena Rusu; Roxana Anghel	Romania	6:29.04	SA/B
3	Aisha Rocek; Giorgia Pelacchi; Laura Meriano; Chiara Ondoli	Italy	6:36.37	SA/B
4	Claire Brillon; Cassidy Deane; Karen Lefsrud; Rebecca Zimmerman	Canada	6:45.82	R

==== Heat 3 ====
Rank	Rower	Country	Time	Notes
1	Lucy Stephan; Katrina Werry; Bronwyn Cox; Annabelle McIntyre	Australia	6:30.12	SA/B
2	Zhang Shuxian; Liu Xiaoxin; Wang Zifeng; Xu Xingye	China	6:35.38	SA/B
3	Weronika Kazmierczak; Olga Michałkiewicz; Barbara Jechorek; Zuzanna Lesner	Poland	6:32.76	SA/B
4	Catherine Layburn; Davina Waddy; Beth Ross; Phoebe Spoors	New Zealand	6:36.40	R

=== Repechage ===
The three fastest boats advanced to the semifinals A/B.

Rank	Rower	Country	Time	Notes
1	Catherine Layburn; Davina Waddy; Beth Ross; Phoebe Spoors	New Zealand	6:38.08	SA/B
2	Emma Cornelis; Adele Brosse; Julie Voirin; Maya Cornut	France	6:40.72	SA/B
3	Victoria Opitz; Teal Cohen; Erin Boxberger; Allyson Baker	United States	6:42.00	SA/B
4	Claire Brillon; Cassidy Deane; Karen Lefsrud; Rebecca Zimmerman	Canada	6:45.21	

=== Semifinals A/B ===
The three fastest boats in each semi advanced to the A final. The remaining boats were sent to the B final.

==== Semifinal 1 ====
Rank	Rower	Country	Time	Notes
1	Heidi Long; Rowan McKellar; Samantha Redgrave; Rebecca Shorten	Great Britain	6:38.89	FA
2	Aifric Keogh; Eimear Lambe; Fiona Murtagh; Emily Hegarty	Ireland	6:40.85	FA
3	Zhang Shuxian; Liu Xiaoxin; Wang Zifeng; Xu Xingye	China	6:43.74	FA
4	Catherine Layburn; Davina Waddy; Beth Ross; Phoebe Spoors	New Zealand	6:46.07	FB
5	Aisha Rocek; Giorgia Pelacchi; Laura Meriano; Chiara Ondoli	Italy	6:49.37	FB
6	Victoria Opitz; Teal Cohen; Erin Boxberger; Allyson Baker	United States	6:52.81	FB

==== Semifinal 2 ====
Rank	Rower	Country	Time	Notes
1	Marloes Oldenburg; Benthe Boonstra; Hermijntje Drenth; Tinka Offereins	Netherlands	6:44.10	FA
2	Mădălina Bereș; Amalia Bereș; Magdalena Rusu; Roxana Anghel	Romania	6:46.14	FA
3	Lucy Stephan; Katrina Werry; Bronwyn Cox; Annabelle McIntyre	Australia	6:46.44	FA
4	Julie Poulsen; Marie Johannesen; Frida Sanggaard Nielsen; Astrid Steensberg	Denmark	6:48.55	FB
5	Weronika Kazmierczak; Olga Michałkiewicz; Barbara Jechorek; Zuzanna Lesner	Poland	6:57.45	FB
6	Emma Cornelis; Adele Brosse; Julie Voirin; Maya Cornut	France	7:03.91	FB

=== Finals ===
The A final determined the rankings for places 1 to 6. Additional rankings were determined in the other finals

==== Final B ====
Rank	Rower	Country	Time	Total rank
1	Julie Poulsen; Marie Johannesen; Frida Sanggaard Nielsen; Astrid Steensberg	Denmark	6:39.48	7
2	Catherine Layburn; Davina Waddy; Beth Ross; Phoebe Spoors	New Zealand	6:42.55	8
3	Aisha Rocek; Giorgia Pelacchi; Laura Meriano; Chiara Ondoli	Italy	6:43.08	9
4	Emma Cornelis; Adele Brosse; Julie Voirin; Maya Cornut	France	6:47.87	10
5	Weronika Kazmierczak; Olga Michałkiewicz; Barbara Jechorek; Zuzanna Lesner	Poland	6:50.44	11
6	Victoria Opitz; Teal Cohen; Erin Boxberger; Allyson Baker	United States	6:51.82	12

==== Final A ====
Rank	Rower	Country	Time	Notes
1st place, gold medalist(s)	Heidi Long; Rowan McKellar; Samantha Redgrave; Rebecca Shorten	Great Britain	6:26.40	
2nd place, silver medalist(s)	Marloes Oldenburg; Benthe Boonstra; Hermijntje Drenth; Tinka Offereins	Netherlands	6:28.62	
3rd place, bronze medalist(s)	Lucy Stephan; Katrina Werry; Bronwyn Cox; Annabelle McIntyre	Australia	6:29.29	
4	Mădălina Bereș; Amalia Bereș; Magdalena Rusu; Roxana Anghel	Romania	6:31.48	
5	Zhang Shuxian; Liu Xiaoxin; Wang Zifeng; Xu Xingye	China	6:32.22	
6	Aifric Keogh; Eimear Lambe; Fiona Murtagh; Emily Hegarty	Ireland	6:34.72	
