= Rowing at the 2024 Summer Olympics =

Rowing at the Games of the XXXIII Olympiad
- Venue: Stade nautique de Vaires-sur-Marne, National Olympic Nautical Stadium of Île-de-France, Vaires-sur-Marne
- Dates: 27 July – 3 August 2024
- No. of events: 14 (7 men, 7 women)
- Competitors: 502

The rowing competitions at the 2024 Summer Olympics in Paris ran from 27 July to 3 August at the Stade nautique de Vaires-sur-Marne, National Olympic Nautical Stadium of Île-de-France in Vaires-sur-Marne. The number of rowers competing across fourteen gender-based categories at these Games was reduced from 526 to 502, with an equal distribution between men’s and women’s events. Despite the slight changes in athlete figures, the rowing program for Paris 2024 remained constant from the previous edition as the competition featured an equal number of categories for men and women, with seven each.

== Competition format ==
The rowing program featured a total of fourteen events, seven each for both men and women in identical boat classes. The program was the same as that of the 2020 Olympics. This was the last Olympics where lightweight rowing was featured, to be replaced by coastal rowing at the 2028 Olympics.

Events for the 2024 Paris Olympics consisted of men's and women's events for the two disciplines of rowing:

- Sweep rowing, where each rower uses a single oar:

- Coxless pairs
- Coxless fours
- Eights, with coxswains

- Sculling, where rowers use two oars placed on opposite sides of the boat:

- Single sculls
- Double sculls
- Lightweight (weight restricted) double sculls
- Quadruple sculls

== Qualification ==
502 rowing quota places were available for Paris 2024, about twenty-four less overall than those in Tokyo 2020. Qualified NOCs were entitled to enter a single boat for each of the fourteen categories.

The qualification period commenced at the 2023 World Rowing Championships, on 3 to 10 September in Belgrade, Serbia, where about two-thirds of the total quota were awarded to the highest-ranked crews across fourteen categories. These quota places were distributed to the NOCs, not to specific rowers, finishing among the top nine in the single sculls (both men and women), top seven in the lightweight double sculls, fours, and quadruple sculls, top five in the eights, and top eleven each in the pairs and double sculls. The remainder of the total quota were attributed to the eligible rowers at each of the four continental qualification regattas in Asia and Oceania, the Americas, Africa, and Europe, and at the final Olympic qualification regatta in Lucerne, Switzerland.

As the host country, France reserved one quota place in the men's and women's single sculls had they not qualified in other classes. Four quota places (two per gender) are entitled to the NOCs competing in the same category under the Tripartite Commission.

== Competition schedule ==
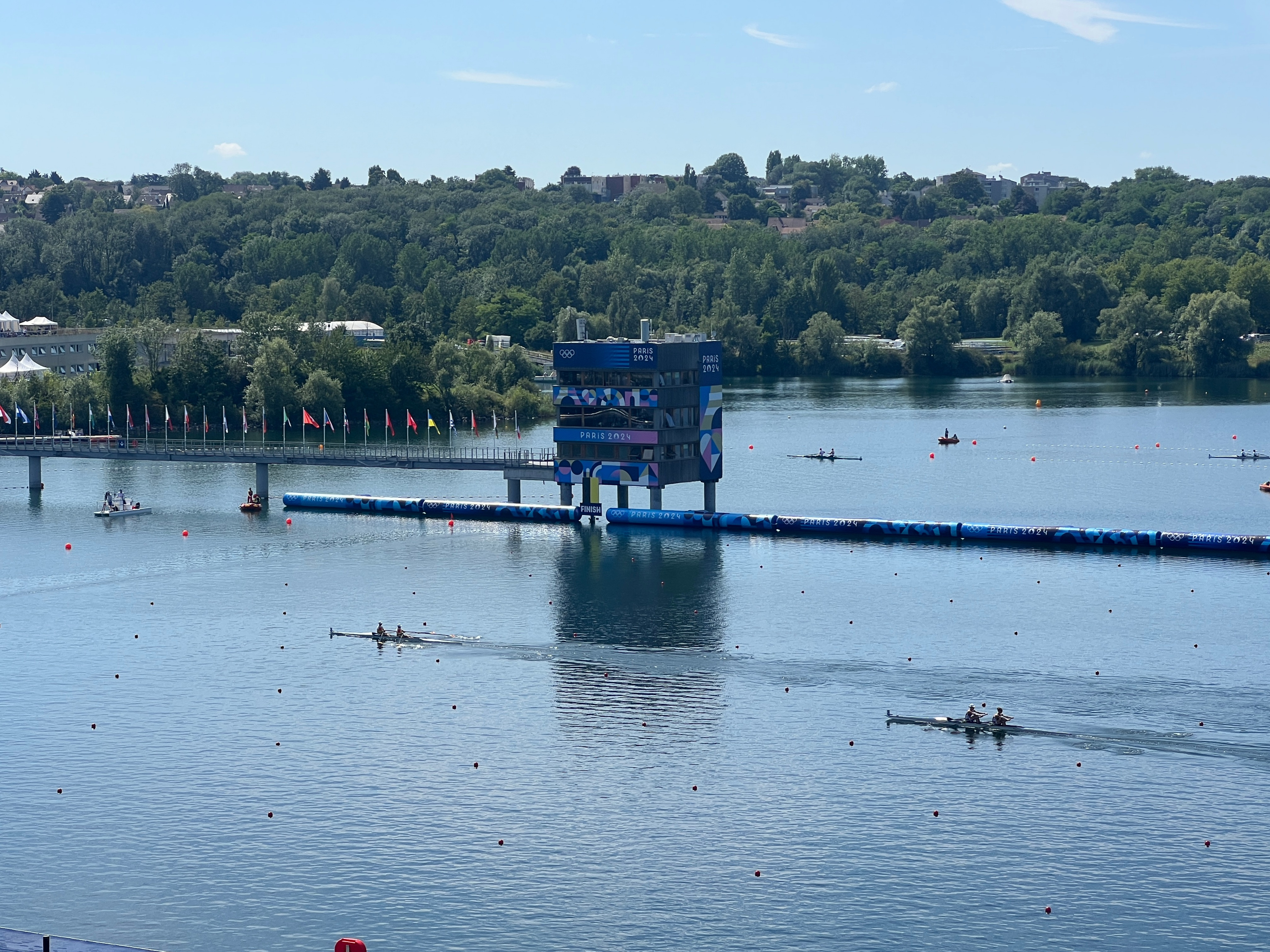
Finish area of the Stade nautique de Vaires-sur-Marne during the Olympics

Legend
H	Heats	R	Repechage	¼	Quarter-finals	½	Semi-finals	F	Final

Men's and women's races in each boat class are held on the same day.
Event↓/Date →	Sat 27	Sun 28	Mon 29	Tues 30	Wed 31	Thu 1	Fri 2	Sat 3
Men's single sculls Women's single sculls	H	R	½	¼	½		F	
Men's pair Women's pair		H	R		½		F	
Men's double sculls Women's double sculls	H	R		½		F		
Men's lightweight double sculls Women's lightweight double sculls		H	R		½		F	
Men's four Women's four		H		R		F		
Men's quadruple sculls Women's quadruple sculls	H		R		F			
Men's eight Women's eight			H			R		F

== Participating nations ==
There were 65 participating nations:

- Algeria (2)
- Angola (1)
- Argentina (4)
- Australia (37)
- Austria (3)
- Azerbaijan (1)
- Belgium (3)
- Bermuda (1)
- Brazil (2)
- Bulgaria (2)
- Canada (11)
- Chile (4)
- China (14)
- Croatia (5)
- Cuba (2)
- Czech Republic (6)
- Denmark (16)
- Egypt (3)
- Estonia (4)
- France (12)
- Germany (23)
- Great Britain (42)
- Greece (7)
- Hong Kong (1)
- Hungary (1)
- India (1)
- Individual Neutral Athletes (2)
- Indonesia (1)
- Iran (3)
- Ireland (16)
- Italy (34)
- Japan (5)
- Kazakhstan (1)
- Kuwait (1)
- Libya (1)
- Lithuania (8)
- Mexico (3)
- Monaco (1)
- Morocco (1)
- Netherlands (33)
- New Zealand (20)
- Nicaragua (1)
- Norway (10)
- Paraguay (2)
- Peru (3)
- Philippines (1)
- Poland (6)
- Romania (45)
- Serbia (4)
- Singapore (1)
- Slovenia (1)
- South Africa (3)
- Spain (9)
- Switzerland (17)
- Thailand (1)
- Togo (1)
- Tunisia (3)
- Turkey (1)
- Uganda (1)
- Ukraine (6)
- Uruguay (1)
- United States (42)
- Uzbekistan (3)
- Vietnam (1)
- Zimbabwe (1)

== Medal summary ==
A total of 42 medals were won by 15 NOC's.

=== Medal table ===
* Host nation (France)

Rank	NOC	Gold	Silver	Bronze	Total
1	Netherlands	4	3	1	8
2	Great Britain	3	2	3	8
3	Romania	2	3	0	5
4	New Zealand	1	2	1	4
5	Germany	1	0	1	2
5	Ireland	1	0	1	2
5	United States	1	0	1	2
8	Croatia	1	0	0	1
9	Italy	0	2	0	2
10	Canada	0	1	0	1
–	Individual Neutral Athletes (Note: Individual Neutral Athletes is the name used to represent approved individual Russian and Belarusian athletes at the 2024 Summer Olympics, after the IOC suspended the Russian Olympic Committee and Belarus Olympic Committee due to the Russian invasion of Ukraine. The IOC country code is AIN, after the French name Athlètes Individuels Neutres.)	0	1	0	1
11	Greece	0	0	2	2
12	Australia	0	0	1	1
12	Lithuania	0	0	1	1
12	Poland	0	0	1	1
12	Switzerland	0	0	1	1
Totals (15 entries)		14	14	14	42

=== Men's events ===
Games	Gold	Silver	Bronze
Single sculls	Oliver Zeidler; Germany	Yauheni Zalaty; Individual Neutral Athletes	Simon van Dorp; Netherlands
Double sculls	Romania; Andrei Cornea; Marian Enache	Netherlands; Melvin Twellaar; Stef Broenink	Ireland; Daire Lynch; Philip Doyle
Quadruple sculls	Netherlands; Lennart van Lierop; Finn Florijn; Tone Wieten; Koen Metsemakers	Italy; Luca Chiumento; Luca Rambaldi; Giacomo Gentili; Andrea Panizza	Poland; Fabian Barański; Mateusz Biskup; Dominik Czaja; Mirosław Ziętarski
Coxless pair	Croatia; Martin Sinković; Valent Sinković	Great Britain; Oliver Wynne-Griffith; Thomas George	Switzerland; Roman Röösli; Andrin Gulich
Coxless four	United States; Nick Mead; Justin Best; Michael Grady; Liam Corrigan	New Zealand; Oliver Maclean; Logan Ullrich; Tom Murray; Matt Macdonald	Great Britain; Oliver Wilkes; David Ambler; Matt Aldridge; Freddie Davidson
Eight	Great Britain; Morgan Bolding; Sholto Carnegie; Rory Gibbs; Thomas Ford; Jacob Dawson; Charles Elwes; Thomas Digby; James Rudkin; Harry Brightmore c	Netherlands; Ralf Rienks; Olav Molenaar; Sander de Graaf; Ruben Knab; Gert-Jan van Doorn; Jacob van de Kerkhof; Jan van der Bij; Mick Makker; Dieuwke Fetter c	United States; Henry Hollingsworth; Nicholas Rusher; Christian Tabash; Clark Dean; Christopher Carlson; Peter Chatain; Evan Olson; Pieter Quinton; Rielly Milne c
Lightweight double sculls	Ireland; Fintan McCarthy; Paul O'Donovan	Italy; Stefano Oppo; Gabriel Soares	Greece; Petros Gkaidatzis; Antonios Papakonstantinou

=== Women's events ===
Games	Gold	Silver	Bronze
Single sculls	Karolien Florijn; Netherlands	Emma Twigg; New Zealand	Viktorija Senkutė; Lithuania
Double sculls	New Zealand; Brooke Francis; Lucy Spoors	Romania; Ancuța Bodnar; Simona Radiș	Great Britain; Mathilda Hodgkins-Byrne; Becky Wilde
Quadruple sculls	Great Britain; Lauren Henry; Hannah Scott; Lola Anderson; Georgina Brayshaw	Netherlands; Laila Youssifou; Bente Paulis; Roos de Jong; Tessa Dullemans	Germany; Maren Völz; Tabea Schendekehl; Leonie Menzel; Pia Greiten
Coxless pair	Netherlands; Ymkje Clevering; Veronique Meester	Romania; Ioana Vrînceanu; Roxana Anghel	Australia; Jessica Morrison; Annabelle McIntyre
Coxless four	Netherlands; Marloes Oldenburg; Hermijntje Drenth; Tinka Offereins; Benthe Boonstra	Great Britain; Helen Glover; Esme Booth; Samantha Redgrave; Rebecca Shorten	New Zealand; Jackie Gowler; Phoebe Spoors; Davina Waddy; Kerri Williams
Eight	Romania; Adriana Adam; Roxana Anghel; Amalia Bereș; Ancuta Bodnar; Maria-Magdalena Rusu; Maria Lehaci; Ioana Vrînceanu; Simona Radiș; Victoria-Ștefania Petreanu c	Canada; Abigail Dent; Caileigh Filmer; Kasia Gruchalla-Wesierski; Maya Meschkuleit; Sydney Payne; Jessica Sevick; Kristina Walker; Avalon Wasteneys; Kristen Kit c	Great Britain; Annie Campbell-Orde; Holly Dunford; Emily Ford; Lauren Irwin; Heidi Long; Rowan McKellar; Eve Stewart; Harriet Taylor; Henry Fieldman c
Lightweight double sculls	Great Britain; Emily Craig; Imogen Grant	Romania; Gianina van Groningen; Ionela Cozmiuc	Greece; Dimitra Kontou; Zoi Fitsiou

== See also ==
- Rowing at the 2024 Summer Paralympics
