= Hambleden Pairs Challenge Cup =

Rowing competition

- Venue: Henley Royal Regatta, River Thames
- Location: Henley-on-Thames, Oxfordshire
- Dates: 2017–present

Hambleden Pairs Challenge Cup is a rowing event for women's coxless pairs at the annual Henley Royal Regatta on the River Thames at Henley-on-Thames in England.

The event is open to members of any club but the crew must have British Rowing Senior status in rowing. It was inaugurated in 2017.

== Past winners ==
Year	Winner	Club	Runner-up	Club	Time	Ref
2017	Grace Prendergast; Kerri Gowler	Waiariki	Megan Kalmoe; Tracy Eisser	New York AC	7.48	
2018	Heidi Long; Hannah Scott	Marlow; Bann	Rowan McKellar; Hattie Taylor	Leander Club	7.02	
2019	Grace Prendergast; Kerri Gowler	Waiariki	Lin Xinyu; Ju Rui	China	7.52	
2020	No competition due to COVID-19 pandemic					
2021	Sam Redgrave; Susie Dear	Leander Club	Lily Lindsay; Meg Saunders	Tideway Scullers	8.46	
2022	Jessica Morrison; Meghan Musnicki	California	Anna Campbell-Orde; Sophia Heath	Leander Club	7.59	
2023	Rebecca Edwards; Chloe Brew	Leander Club	Emily M. Lindberg; Elizabeth C. Witt	University of London; Imperial College	9.00	
2024	Emma Cornelis; Joséphine Cornut-Danjou	Club France	Alexis Cronk; Kirsten Edwards	Rowing Canada	8.42	
2025	Madeleine Wanamaker; Claire Collins	New York AC	Ivana Jurković; Josipa Jurković	Croatian Rowing	7.57	
