= 2022 World Rowing Championships – Women's lightweight coxless pair =

Women's lightweight coxless pair at the 2022 World Rowing Championships
- Venue: Labe aréna
- Location: Račice, Czech Republic
- Dates: 20 September – 23 September
- Competitors: 8 from 4 nations
- Winning time: 7:38.19

Medalists
gold medal	Maria Zerboni; Samantha Premerl	Italy
silver medal	Solveig Imsdahl; Elaine Tierney	United States
bronze medal	Sophia Wolf; Eva Hohoff	Germany

The women's lightweight coxless pair competition at the 2022 World Rowing Championships took place at the Račice regatta venue.

== Schedule ==
The schedule was as follows:

Date	Time	Round
Tuesday 20 September 2022	10:47	Heats
Friday 23 September 2022	14:45	Final A

All times are Central European Summer Time (UTC+2)

== Results ==
All boats advanced directly to Final A.

=== Heat ===
Rank	Rower	Country	Time	Notes
1	Maria Zerboni; Samantha Premerl	Italy	7:38.46	FA
2	Solveig Imsdahl; Elaine Tierney	United States	7:39.79	FA
3	Luana de Souza Fagundes; Isadora Helena Greve	Brazil	7:49.93	FA
4	Sophia Wolf; Eva Hohoff	Germany	7:56.86	FA

=== Final A ===
The final determined the rankings.

Rank	Rower	Country	Time	Notes
1st place, gold medalist(s)	Maria Zerboni; Samantha Premerl	Italy	7:38.19	
2nd place, silver medalist(s)	Solveig Imsdahl; Elaine Tierney	United States	7:43.84	
3rd place, bronze medalist(s)	Sophia Wolf; Eva Hohoff	Germany	7:54.97	
4	Luana de Souza Fagundes; Isadora Helena Greve	Brazil	8:00.77	
