= Rowan McKellar =

British rower (born 1994)

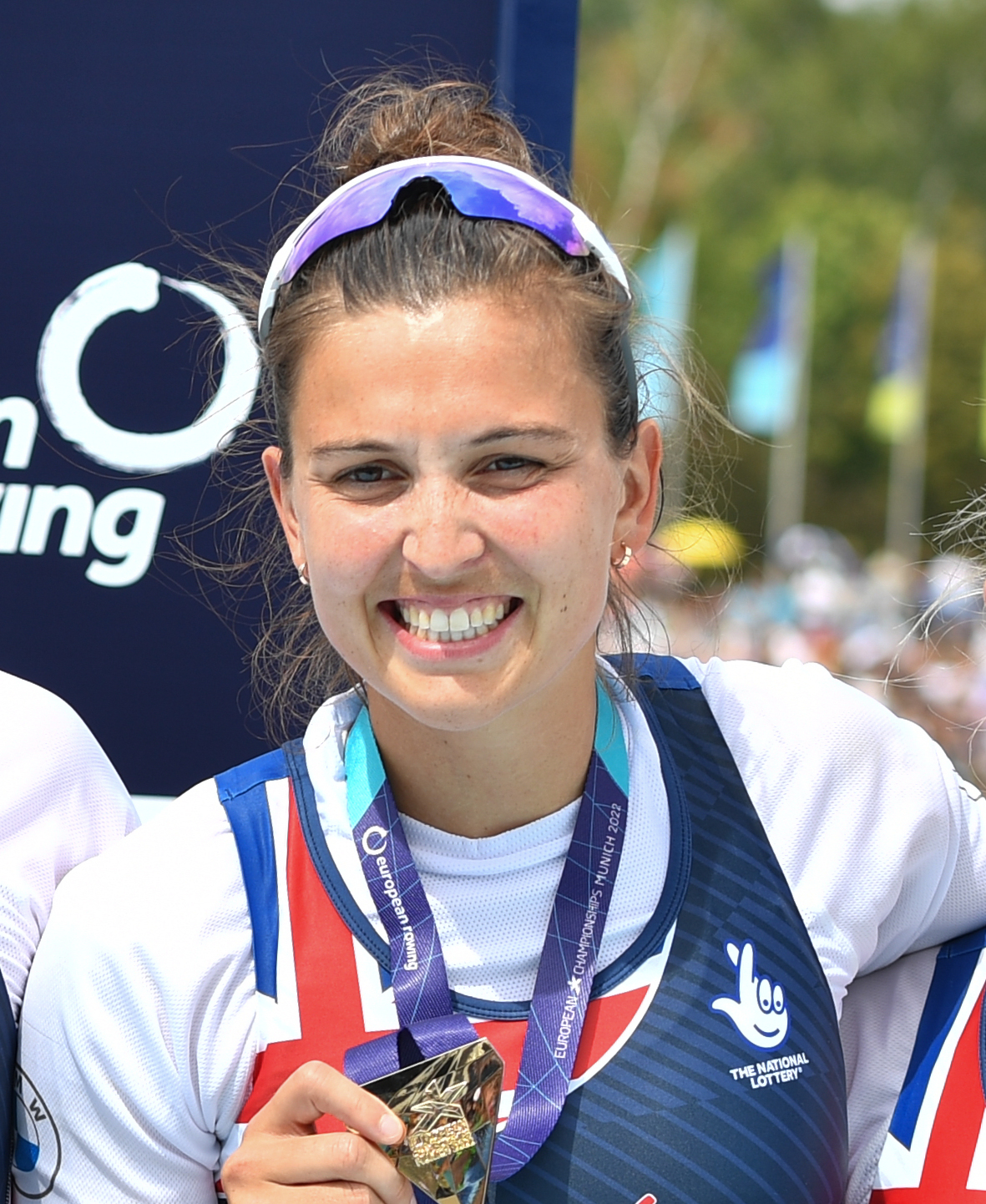
- McKellar at the 2022 European Championships

Personal information
- Born: 24 May 1994 (age 32) Glasgow, Scotland
- Home town: Lochwinnoch, Scotland
- Education: University of California
- Height: 183 cm (6 ft 0 in)

Sport
- Country: Great Britain
- Sport: Rowing
- Club: Leander Club
Medal record
Women's rowing
Representing Great Britain
Olympic Games
Bronze medal – third place	2024 Paris	Eight
World Championships
Gold medal – first place	2022 Račice	Coxless four
Bronze medal – third place	2023 Belgrade	Coxless four
European Championships
Gold medal – first place	2022 Oberschleißheim	Coxless four
Silver medal – second place	2019 Lucerne	Eight
Silver medal – second place	2022 Oberschleißheim	Eight
Silver medal – second place	2023 Bled	Coxless four
Silver medal – second place	2024 Szeged	Eight
Bronze medal – third place	2021 Varese	Coxless four

Rowan McKellar (born 24 May 1994) is a British rower. A two-time Olympian, McKellar won the bronze medal in the Women's Eight event at the 2024 Summer Games. She also holds gold medals from Women's coxless four events at the European and World Rowing Championships.

== Early life and education ==
McKellar is from Glasgow. She was born to parents who both rowed for Scotland in the Commonwealth Games. She graduated from the University of California with a degree in sociology in 2017. She was a member of 2016 NCAA winning eight in her junior college season. In 2017 McKellar was named in the Division I Pocock First Team All-America award, alongside two other rowers from her university.

== Career ==
McKellar won a silver medal in the eight at the 2019 European Rowing Championships. In 2021, she won a European bronze medal in the coxless four in Varese, Italy.

McKellar made her Olympic debut at the 2020 Tokyo Olympic Games, held in 2021. There she competed in the coxless four, where she was part of the British team which finished in fourth place.

McKellar won a gold medal in the coxless four at the 2022 European Rowing Championships in Munich, with teammates Rebecca Shorten, Sam Redgrave and Heidi Long. A month later she was part of the gold-medal winning team in the 2022 World Rowing Championships in the Czech municipality of Račice with the same teammates.

At the 2023 World Rowing Championships in Belgrade, she won the World Championship bronze medal in the women's coxless four.

McKellar won a bronze medal as part of the Great Britain eight at the 2024 Summer Olympics, which was her country's second time finishing in a medal position in that event.
