= Grace Prendergast =

New Zealand rower (born 1992)

Grace Prendergast MNZM
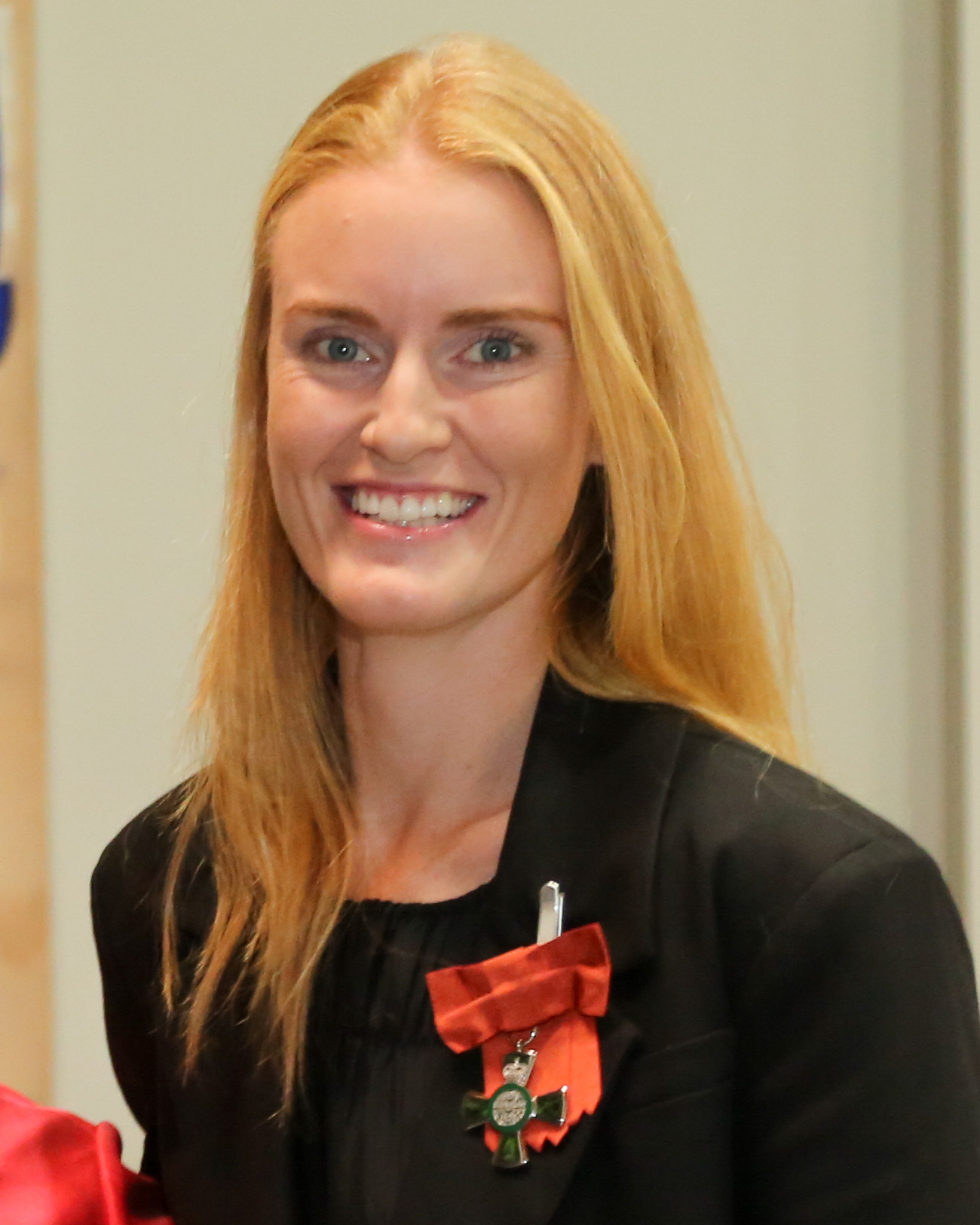
- Prendergast in 2022

Personal information
- Born: 30 June 1992 (age 34) Christchurch, New Zealand
- Education: Villa Maria College; Queens' College, Cambridge
- Height: 1.83 m (6 ft 0 in)
- Weight: 74 kg (163 lb)

Sport
- Sport: Rowing
- Events: Coxless pair, Coxless four, Eight
- Club: Avon Rowing Club
Medal record
Women's rowing
Representing New Zealand
Olympic Games
Gold medal – first place	2020 Tokyo	Coxless pair
Silver medal – second place	2020 Tokyo	Eight
World Championships
Gold medal – first place	2014 Amsterdam	Coxless four
Gold medal – first place	2017 Sarasota	Coxless pair
Gold medal – first place	2019 Ottensheim	Coxless pair
Gold medal – first place	2019 Ottensheim	Eight
Gold medal – first place	2022 Račice	Coxless pair
Silver medal – second place	2015 Aiguebelette	Coxless pair
Silver medal – second place	2015 Aiguebelette	Eight
Silver medal – second place	2018 Plovdiv	Coxless pair

Grace Elizabeth Prendergast MNZM (born 30 June 1992) is a former New Zealand sweep rower. She is a 15-time national champion in the premier category, an Olympic champion, a five-time world champion and the current (2022) world champion in the coxless pair. She grew up in Christchurch, where she started rowing for the Avon Rowing Club in 2007. She competed at the Tokyo Olympics in two boat classes and won gold in the coxless pair and a silver in the eight and set a new world's best time in the pair. Various parties, including the World Rowing Federation, expected her to win medals in Tokyo. She was the highest ranked female rower in the world twice in a row in 2019 and 2021. (Note: Owing to the COVID-19 pandemic, no ranking was undertaken in 2020; the next ranking will be done in October or November 2022.) Since 2014, her rowing partner in the coxless pair has been Kerri Gowler. (Note: Since February 2022, Gowler's married name has been Williams) Prendergast is also a Boat Race winner, having competed as part of Cambridge University Boat Club's (CUBC) women's crew in 2022. She retired from professional rowing in October 2022.

== Early life ==
Prendergast was born in Christchurch, New Zealand, in 1992. Her parents are Tim and Sally Prendergast. Her first year of primary school was at Duvauchelle School in the small Banks Peninsula settlement of Duvauchelle, followed by Halswell School in the Christchurch suburb of Halswell. She attended Villa Maria College, where she started rowing in 2007. She studied at Massey University and graduated first with a bachelor and then a master's in business studies, and is currently studying at Queens' College, Cambridge. Prendergast describes her temperament as "calm" and reserved.

== Career ==
=== Junior rowing ===
Prendergast started rowing for Villa Maria College in 2007 and, due to the school's affiliation, joined the Avon Rowing Club after she left school. In 2010, she was chosen for New Zealand's junior team and she competed with the junior women's four at the 2010 World Rowing Junior Championships in Račice, Czech Republic, where they won gold; Eve MacFarlane was part of the team.

A sweep rower, she cannot row stroke side (also known as port side) due to her scoliosis. Once she was a member of Avon, Prendergast first competed at the New Zealand rowing championships in 2011, when they were held on Lake Ruataniwha. She competed in two U21 boat classes (coxless four and eight) and one premier (Note: Premier is the highest ability class in New Zealand and rowers can compete in this class once they have been accepted by one of the Regional Performance Centres (RPCs).) boat class (eight) and won gold in all three events. There was no international rowing for Prendergast in 2011.

At the February 2012 New Zealand rowing championships held on Lake Karapiro, Prendergast competed in four boat classes. She won gold with the U21 coxless four, and silver with the U21 pair and U21 quad scull. In the premier class, she defended her national championship title in the eight. At the 2012 World Rowing U23 Championships in Trakai, Lithuania, she came fourth in the four; Georgia Perry was in the same boat.

At the February 2013 New Zealand rowing championships, Prendergast competed in three premier boat classes, gaining one silver medal (coxless four) and two national championships (coxless pair and eight). She was picked for the New Zealand elite team to compete in the eight. The 2013 World Rowing Cup I was held in Sydney, Australia, where they came fifth. The team then travelled to World Rowing Cup III, which was held on the Rotsee in Switzerland, where they came sixth. At the 2013 World Rowing Championships on the Tangeum Lake in Chungju, South Korea, they missed the A-final but came first in the B-final (seventh overall).

=== Senior rowing ===
At the February 2014 New Zealand rowing championships, Prendergast competed in one U22 and three premier boat classes. She won gold with the U22 eight. In the premier quad scull and the premier coxless pair (with Eve MacFarlane), she won silver medals. In the premier eight, she defended her national title. During the trials for the national team selection shortly afterwards, she first teamed up with Kerri Gowler in the coxless pair. She travelled with a New Zealand squad to the 2014 World Rowing Cup III at the Rotsee, where she won a silver medal in the coxless pair with Gowler. They had started as NZII, with NZI made consisting of Louise Trappitt and Rebecca Scown, but they beat the higher-rated team by five seconds and displaced them to the bronze medal position. They themselves were beaten by Helen Glover and Heather Stanning from Great Britain, then the reigning Olympic and (in Glover's case) world champions. Prendergast and Gowler then went to the 2014 World Rowing U23 Championships in Varese, Italy, where they won gold with a massive 13-second lead over an American pair. Based on this performance, Rowing New Zealand formed a coxless four for the 2014 World Rowing Championships in Amsterdam in the following month, where Gowler and Prendergast were joined by Kayla Pratt and Kelsey Bevan. They won the world championship title in a world-best time. (Note: There are no world records in rowing due to the huge variability that weather conditions can have on times. Instead there are world best times.)

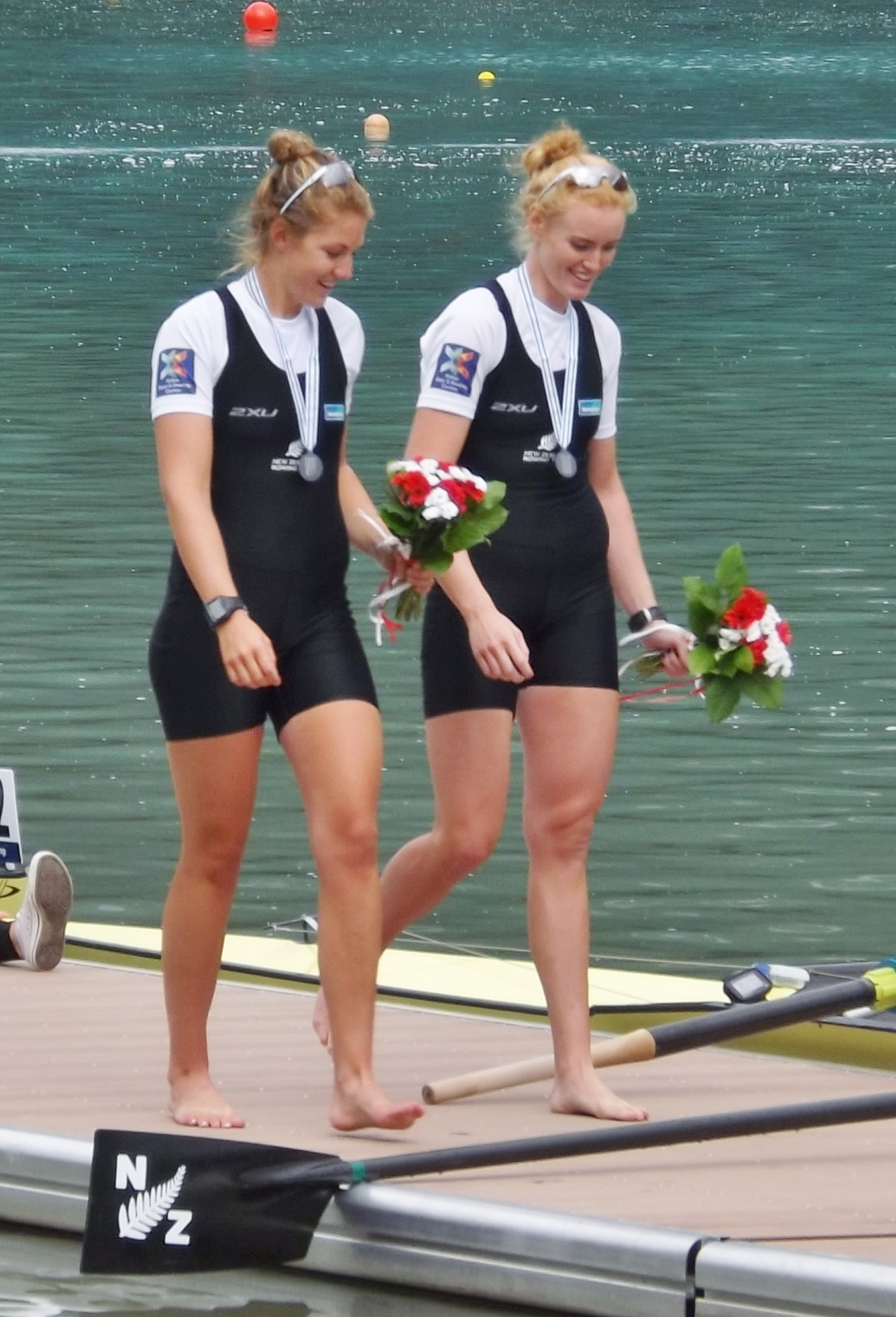
Kerri Gowler (left) and Prendergast after winning silver at the 2015 World Rowing Championships

At the February 2015 New Zealand rowing championships, Prendergast competed in two premier boat classes and took out two national titles. She defended her title in the eight for a fifth year and also won gold in the coxless pair partnered with Kristen Froude. Internationally, she continued rowing with Gowler in the coxless pair. At the 2015 World Rowing Cup II in Varese, Italy, they won bronze. At the World Rowing Cup III on the Rotsee, they won silver. At the same event, they both joined the women's eight and won another silver. The same approach was used at the 2015 World Rowing Championships in Aiguebelette, France, where they won silver in both boat classes. Those silver medals qualified both boat classes for the 2016 Rio Olympics. (Note: In rowing, boat classes get qualified and it is then up to national rowing bodies to nominate rowers for the event; they may be different to those who achieved the qualification.)

At the February 2016 New Zealand rowing championships, Prendergast competed in three premier boat classes and won one national title. She lost her title in the eight as the boat came second. She was also second with the coxless four. Teamed up with Emma Dyke, she retained her national title in the coxless pair. When the Olympic rowing team got announced in March 2016, it came as a big disappointment to Gowler and Prendergast that they were not picked for the coxless pair (this was given to Rebecca Scown and Genevieve Behrent) but were chosen for the women's eight instead. Not picking world championship silver medallists was described by The New Zealand Herald as demonstrating the "depth and competitiveness" of New Zealand's female squad in 2016. The eight squad went to the 2016 World Rowing Cups II and III in Switzerland and Poland in preparation for the Olympics, and they came third and first, respectively. At the August 2016 Rio Olympics they came fourth.

At the 2017 New Zealand rowing nationals at Lake Ruataniwha, she once again partnered with Dyke in the premier women's pair and they retained their national championship. She also won national titles in the coxless four and the eight. As Behrent wanted to take 2017 off, Gowler and Prendergast were chosen for the coxless pair for international rowing in 2017. They dominated in the boat class and won gold at 2017 World Rowing Cups II and III, and in between the inaugural race for the Hambleden Pairs Challenge Cup as part of the Henley Royal Regatta. At the 2017 World Rowing Championships in Sarasota, Florida, United States, they became world champions with a comfortable margin of nearly four seconds over a team from the United States.

At the 2018 New Zealand rowing nationals at Lake Karapiro, she retained her national title with Dyke in the coxless pair and also won the coxless four. With the eight, she won silver. Continuing to row with Gowler internationally, they won the 2018 World Rowing Cups II and III, but were beaten by the Canadian team of Caileigh Filmer and Hillary Janssens at the 2018 World Rowing Championships in Plovdiv, Bulgaria.

At the 2019 New Zealand rowing nationals at Lake Ruataniwha, she came second in both the coxless pair and the eight. Gowler and Prendergast were reconfirmed for the women's pair in April 2019. At the 2019 World Rowing Cup II in Poznań, Poland, they won gold. At Henley, they won races with both the eight (Remenham Challenge Cup) and the coxless pair (Hambleden Pairs Challenge Cup). At the World Rowing Cup III in Rotterdam, Netherlands, they competed in both the eight (gold) and in the coxless pair (silver, beaten by the Australian team of Jessica Morrison and Annabelle McIntyre). At the 2019 World Rowing Championships in Linz–Ottensheim, they regained the coxless pair world championship title, with the Australians in second place (some two seconds behind) and the Canadians in bronze position. They also competed with the eight and gained a second gold medal at the event, beating the Australian team by nearly three seconds. These results qualified both boat classes for the 2020 Tokyo Olympics.

At the 2020 New Zealand rowing nationals at Lake Karapiro, Prendergast competed in two boat classes. In the coxless pair with Dyke, she regained her national title. In the coxless four she came second. Due to the COVID-19 pandemic, there was no international rowing during 2020.

In early February 2021, Rowing New Zealand announced the elite women's team for the Olympic year, with Prendergast and Gowler nominated for the coxless pair as well as being part of the eight. Two weeks later at the 2021 New Zealand rowing nationals at Lake Ruataniwha, Prendergast competed in three boat classes. In the coxless four, the team did not finish the race. In the coxless pair (with Dyke) and the eight, she won national titles. When New Zealand's Olympic team was announced in June 2021, Prendergast and Gowler were confirmed to start with both the coxless pair and the eight. In November 2020, the World Rowing Federation predicted that New Zealand and Australia are currently so dominant that their teams would compete in the eight for gold and silver, with the remaining nations fighting over bronze. Former Olympian Sarah Cowley Ross, who will commentate from Tokyo for TVNZ, expects the eight and the coxless pair to both get medals. Sports bookmaker Pinnacle offers very low odds for the women's eight and the coxless pair to win gold. As of 9 July, for every dollar paid in, they would pay out $2.07 and $2.67 for the eight and the coxless pair winning gold, respectively.

At the Sea Forest Waterway in Tokyo, Prendergast and Gowler won their heat, the semi-final in a new world best time (beaten ten minutes earlier by Greece in the first semi-final), and the A final, for Olympic gold. They also won the heat in the eight, just three hours after their pair's heat. In the final, the New Zealand eight won silver behind Canada.

In 2022, Prendergast rowed in the 7-seat of the Cambridge women's eight in the 2022 Boat Race, a crew which went on to win in a record time of 18 minutes and 22 seconds. She announced her retirement from professional rowing on 27 October 2022.

=== National titles ===
National titles for senior rowers are known as Red Coats in New Zealand. She last competed at the national championships in 2021. During her career, Prendergast won 15 premier Red Coats.

Red Coats – New Zealand premier national titles
Coxless pair	2013, 2015, 2016, 2017, 2018, 2020, 2021
Coxless four	2017, 2018
Eight	2011, 2012, 2013, 2014, 2015, 2021

== Ranking, honours and awards ==
The World Rowing Federation publishes an annual Top 10 Ranking for both men and women, with the ranking based on performance at international events over the previous three years. Prendergast was first included in the list in 2018 ranked in sixth place, with Gowler in ninth place. In 2019, Prendergast was the highest-ranked female rower in the world, with Gowler in second place. No ranking was done in 2020 as the international events had all been cancelled. Prendergast and Gowler remained their rankings in 2021.

At the November 2019 World Rowing Awards, Prendergast and Gowler won World Rowing Women's Crew of the Year. Their coach, Gary Hay (he also coaches the women's eight), won World Rowing Coach of the Year. At the 2020 Sport Canterbury Awards, Prendergast won the Supreme Sportsperson of the Year title, breaking shot putter Tom Walsh's dominance. Hay won the coach of the year award at the same event.

In the 2022 Queen's Birthday and Platinum Jubilee Honours, Prendergast was appointed a Member of the New Zealand Order of Merit, for services to rowing.
