= Reelick =

Reelick is a surname. Notable people with the surname incidue:

- Erin Reelick (born 1993), American rower
- Kelsey Reelick (born 1991), American rower
