= Jessica Sevick =

Canadian rower (born 1989)

Personal information
- Nationality: Canada
- Born: July 15, 1989 (age 37) Vancouver, British Columbia
- Height: 178 cm (5 ft 10 in)
- Weight: 72 kg (159 lb)

Sport
- College team: University of British Columbia
Medal record
Women's rowing
Representing Canada
Olympic Games
Silver medal – second place	2024 Paris	Eight
World Championships
Bronze medal – third place	2022 Račice	Eight
Rowing at the Pan American Games
Gold medal – first place	2019 Lima	Single sculls

Jessica Sevick (born July 15, 1989) is an Olympian and National Team Rower from Canada. Sevick was the Pan American Games Champion when she won gold in women's single sculls at the 2019 Pan Am Games in Lima. She studied neuroscience at the University of British Columbia where she competed on the UBC Thunderbirds rowing team.

Sevick along with Gabrielle Smith were named to the double sculls boat for the 2020 Summer Olympics.

Sevick's father, Brian, is a professor of Environmental Science at Mount Royal University in Calgary, Alberta.
