= Avalon Wasteneys =

Canadian rower (born 1997)

Personal information
- Born: August 31, 1997 (age 28) Toronto, Ontario, Canada
- Height: 185 cm (6 ft 1 in)
- Weight: 75 kg (165 lb)
Medal record
Women's rowing
Representing Canada
Olympic Games
Gold medal – first place	2020 Tokyo	Eight
Silver medal – second place	2024 Paris	Eight
World Championships
Bronze medal – third place	2022 Račice	Eight
World Championships (U23)
Gold medal – first place	2018 Poznań	Eight

Avalon Clare Wasteneys (born August 31, 1997) is a Canadian rower. Wasteneys's hometown is Campbell River, British Columbia and she resides in Victoria, British Columbia.

Wasteneys is a former cross-country skier, who was discovered as a natural fit for rowing in 2017 as part of the RBC Training Ground program, where she was named regional champion.

== Personal life ==
Wasteneys' mother Heather Clarke competed at the 1988 Summer Olympics in the women's coxed four event, while her aunt Christine Clarke competed at the 1984 Summer Olympics in the eights boat.

== Career ==
Wasteneys is a one time U-23 World Champion in the women's eights boat, in 2018. Later in 2018, Wasteneys helped the senior women's eights boat to a silver at the World Cup III Regatta in Lucerne Switzerland. In 2019, Wasteneys was part of the eights boat, finishing in fourth at the World Championships and qualifying Canada’s boat for the 2020 Summer Olympics.

In June 2021, Wasteneys was named to Canada's 2020 Olympic team in the women's eights boat. At the Olympics, the boat won the gold medal, Canada's first in the event since 1992.
