= Kasia Gruchalla-Wesierski =

Canadian rower (born 1991)

Personal information
- Born: 31 March 1991 (age 35) Montreal, Quebec, Canada
- Height: 177 cm (5 ft 10 in)
- Weight: 78 kg (172 lb)
Medal record
Women's rowing
Representing Canada
Olympic Games
Gold medal – first place	2020 Tokyo	Eight
Silver medal – second place	2024 Paris	Eight
World Championships
Bronze medal – third place	2022 Račice	Eight

Kasia Gruchalla-Wesierski (born March 31, 1991) is a Canadian rower. Gruchalla-Wesierski's hometown is Calgary, Alberta.

== Career ==
Gruchalla-Wesierski was originally an alpine skier, however a broken leg injury resulted in her switching to rowing. Gruchalla-Wesierski made her national team debut in 2018.

In 2019, Gruchalla-Wesierski was part of the eights boat, finishing in fourth at the World Championships and qualifying Canada the boat for the 2020 Summer Olympics.

In June 2021, Gruchalla-Wesierski was named to Canada's 2020 Olympic team in the women's eights boat. At the Olympics, the boat won the gold medal, Canada's first in the event since 1992.
