= Rebecca Shorten =

Northern Irish rower (born 1993)

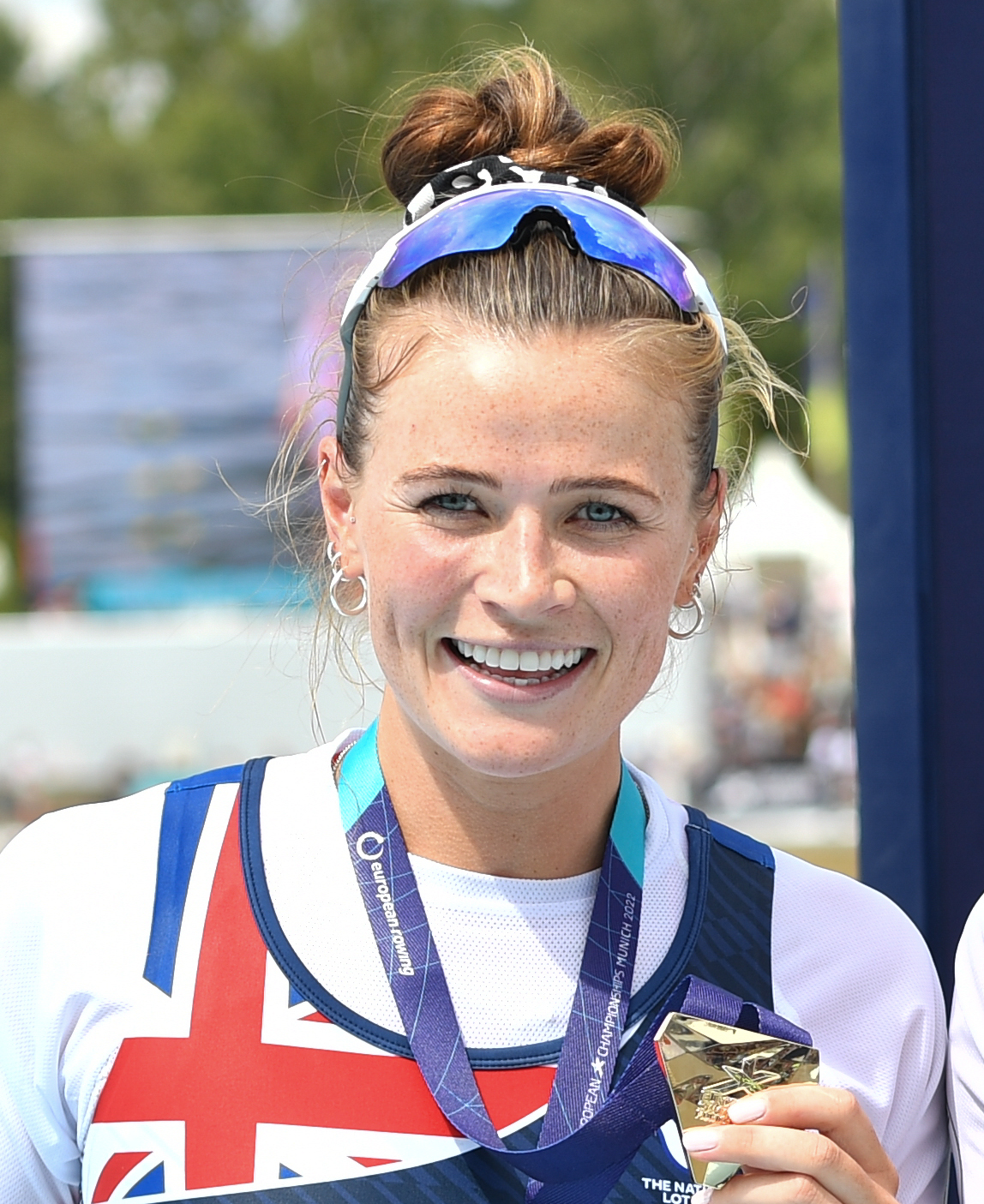
- Shorten in 2022

Personal information
- Born: 25 November 1993 (age 32) Belfast, Northern Ireland
- Height: 1.81 m (5 ft 11 in)

Sport
- Country: Great Britain
- Sport: Rowing
Medal record
Women's rowing
Representing Great Britain
Olympic Games
Silver medal – second place	2024 Paris	Coxless four
World Championships
Gold medal – first place	2022 Račice	Coxless four
Bronze medal – third place	2023 Belgrade	Coxless four
European Championships
Gold medal – first place	2022 Oberschleißheim	Coxless four
Gold medal – first place	2024 Szeged	Coxless four
Silver medal – second place	2018 Glasgow	Eight
Silver medal – second place	2019 Lucerne	Eight
Silver medal – second place	2022 Oberschleißheim	Eight
Silver medal – second place	2023 Bled	Coxless four
Bronze medal – third place	2021 Varese	Coxless four

Rebecca Shorten (born 25 November 1993) is a Northern Irish rower from Belfast. She is a world and European gold medallist and Olympic silver medallist for Great Britain.

She attended Methodist College Belfast and Roehampton University.

== Career ==
Shorten won a silver medal in the eight at the 2019 European Rowing Championships.

In 2021, she won a European bronze medal in the coxless four in Varese, Italy.

She was selected for the British team to compete in the rowing events, in the coxless four for the 2020 Summer Olympics.

She won a gold medal in the coxless four at the 2022 European Rowing Championships and the 2022 World Rowing Championships.

At the 2023 World Rowing Championships in Belgrade, she won the World Championship bronze medal in the women's coxless four.

In August 2024, Shorten was stroke for the British team that won a silver medal in the Women's Four at the Paris Olympics.
