= Victoria Opitz =

American rower (born 1988)

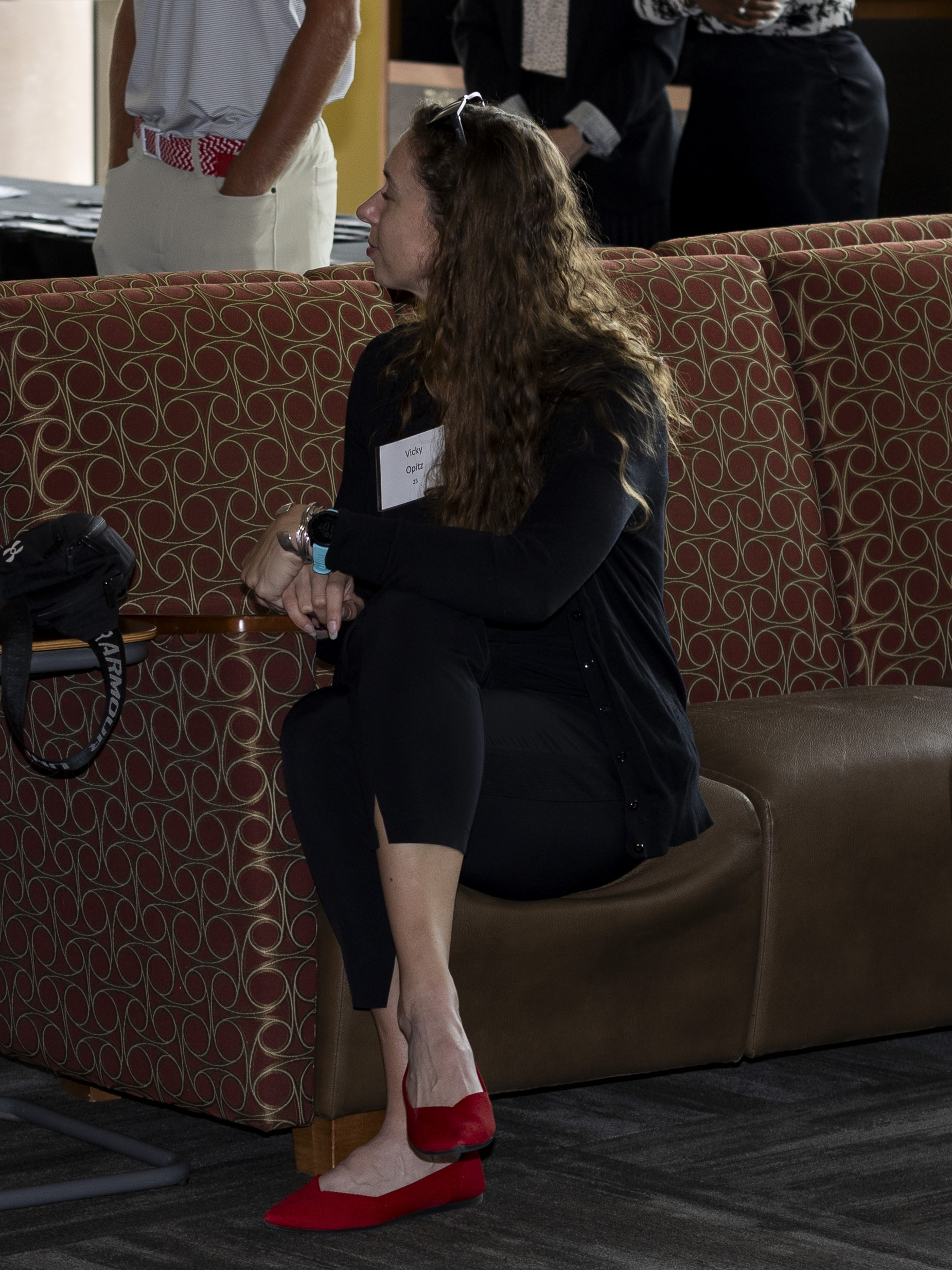
- Opitz in 2024

Personal information
- Born: June 5, 1988 (age 38) Madison, Wisconsin, U.S.
- Height: 5 ft 11 in (1.80 m)

Sport
- Country: United States
- Sport: Rowing
- College team: Wisconsin Badgers
Medal record
Women's rowing
Representing the United States
World Championships
Gold medal – first place	2013 Chungju	W8+
Gold medal – first place	2014 Amsterdam	W8+
Gold medal – first place	2015 Aiguebelette	W8+
Gold medal – first place	2018 Plovdiv	W8+

Victoria "Vicky" Opitz (born June 5, 1988) is an American rower and four-time world champion in the eights. After retaining her world title in 2015, she was officially ranked #5 female rower in the world.

== Rowing career ==
Opitz began rowing in 2006 at the University of Wisconsin. In 2011, she graduated in political science and communication. She lived and trained in Princeton, New Jersey. In 2023 she shifted from coaching lightweight rowing at the University of Wisconsin to the Head Coach position for the Openweight women’s rowing team at the University of Wisconsin.

Her international debut in the USA eight resulted in victory at the Rowing World Cup in 2013 in Lucerne and was followed by victory at the 2013 World Rowing Championships in Chungju, South Korea.
