= Benthe Boonstra =

Dutch rower (born 2000)

Personal information
- Born: 20 November 2000 (age 25)

Sport
- Country: Netherlands
- Sport: Rowing
Medal record
Women's rowing
Representing NED
Olympic Games
Gold medal – first place	2024 Paris	Coxless four
World Championships
Gold medal – first place	2025 Shanghai	Double sculls
Gold medal – first place	2023 Belgrade	Coxless four
Silver medal – second place	2022 Račice	Coxless four
Silver medal – second place	2022 Račice	Eight
Silver medal – second place	2026 Amsterdam	Double sculls
European Championships
Bronze medal – third place	2022 Oberschleißheim	Eight
Bronze medal – third place	2023 Bled	Coxless four

Benthe Boonstra (born 20 November 2000) is a Dutch rower. She won a gold medal in the coxless four at the 2023 World Rowing Championships. In 2024, she won a gold medal in the women's coxless four event at the Paris Olympics.
