= Mădălina Bereș =

Romanian rower (born 1993)

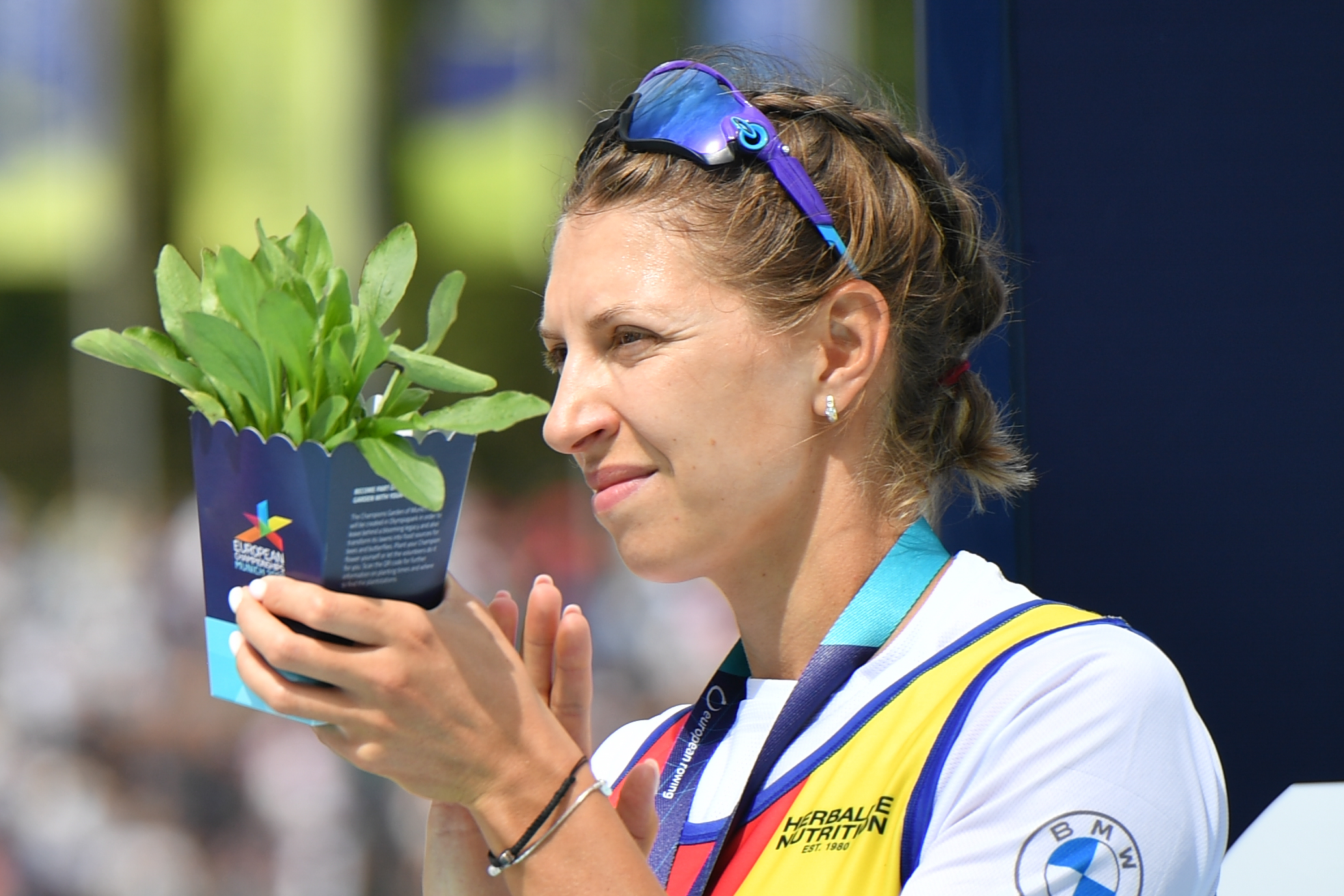
- Bereș in 2022

Personal information
- Nationality: Romanian
- Born: 3 July 1993 (age 32) Iași, Romania
- Height: 1.86 m (6 ft 1 in)
- Weight: 75 kg (165 lb)

Sport
- Country: Romania
- Sport: Rowing
- Event(s): Eight; Coxless four Coxless pair
Medal record
Women's rowing
Representing Romania
Olympic Games
Bronze medal – third place	2016 Rio de Janeiro	Eight
World Championships
Gold medal – first place	2017 Sarasota	Eight
Gold medal – first place	2022 Račice	Eight
Gold medal – first place	2023 Belgrade	Eight
Silver medal – second place	2023 Belgrade	Coxless four
European Championships
Gold medal – first place	2017 Račice	Coxless pair
Gold medal – first place	2017 Račice	Eight
Gold medal – first place	2018 Glasgow	Coxless pair
Gold medal – first place	2018 Glasgow	Eight
Gold medal – first place	2020 Poznań	Eight
Gold medal – first place	2021 Varese	Eight
Gold medal – first place	2022 Oberschleißheim	Eight
Gold medal – first place	2023 Bled	Coxless four
Gold medal – first place	2023 Bled	Eight
Gold medal – first place	2024 Szeged	Eight
Silver medal – second place	2019 Lucerne	Coxless four
Silver medal – second place	2024 Szeged	Coxless four
Bronze medal – third place	2015 Poznań	Eight
Bronze medal – third place	2016 Brandenburg an der Havel	Coxless pair
Bronze medal – third place	2022 Oberschleißheim	Coxless four

Mădălina Bereș (born 3 July 1993) is a Romanian rower. She is a two-time Olympian and won the bronze medal in the women's eight at the 2016 Summer Olympics. Bereș is a three-time world champion in eight and ten-time European champion, including titles in eight, coxless pair and coxless four. She competed in the women's coxless pair at the 2016 Summer Olympics and the women's eight at the 2020 Summer Olympics. Bereș is the older sister of fellow rower Amalia Bereș.
