= Tinka Offereins =

Dutch rower (born 1993)

Personal information
- Born: 5 October 1993 (age 32)

Sport
- Country: Netherlands
- Sport: Rowing
Medal record
Women's rowing
Representing NED
Olympic Games
Gold medal – first place	2024 Paris	Coxless four
World Championships
Gold medal – first place	2023 Belgrade	Coxless four
Gold medal – first place	2025 Shanghai	Eight
Silver medal – second place	2022 Račice	Coxless four
Silver medal – second place	2022 Račice	Eight
Silver medal – second place	2026 Amsterdam	Mixed eight
Bronze medal – third place	2026 Amsterdam	Coxless four
European Championships
Gold medal – first place	2025 Plovdiv	Coxless four
Silver medal – second place	2025 Plovdiv	Eight
Silver medal – second place	2021 Varese	Eight
Bronze medal – third place	2020 Poznań	Eight
Bronze medal – third place	2022 Oberschleißheim	Eight
Bronze medal – third place	2023 Bled	Coxless four

Tinka Offereins (born 5 October 1993) is a Dutch rower. She won a gold medal in the coxless four at the 2023 World Rowing Championships. In 2024, she won a gold medal in the women's coxless four event at the Paris Olympics.
