= Ymkje Clevering =

Dutch rower (born 1995)

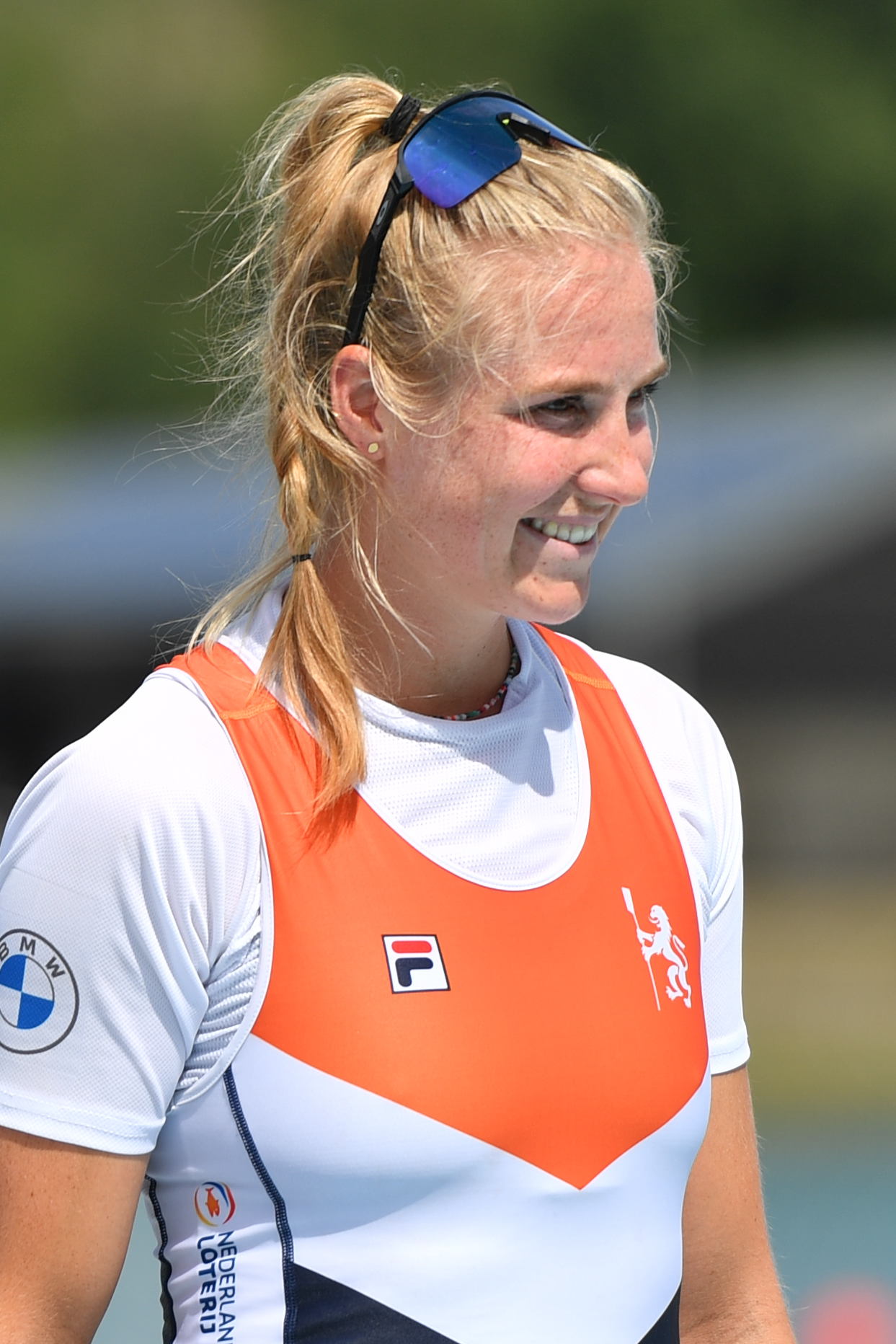
- Clevering in 2022

Personal information
- Nationality: Dutch
- Born: 17 July 1995 (age 31) Haulerwijk, Netherlands

Sport
- Country: Netherlands
- Sport: Rowing
- Event: Coxless four
- Club: A.G.S.R. Gyas
Medal record
Women's rowing
Representing the Netherlands
Olympic Games
Gold medal – first place	2024 Paris	Coxless pair
Silver medal – second place	2020 Tokyo	Coxless four
World Championships
Gold medal – first place	2023 Belgrade	Coxless pair
Gold medal – first place	2025 Shanghai	Eight
Silver medal – second place	2019 Ottensheim	Coxless four
Silver medal – second place	2022 Račice	Coxless pair
Silver medal – second place	2022 Račice	Eight
Silver medal – second place	2026 Amsterdam	Mixed eight
Bronze medal – third place	2026 Amsterdam	Coxless four
European Championships
Gold medal – first place	2019 Lucerne	Coxless four
Gold medal – first place	2020 Poznań	Coxless four
Gold medal – first place	2021 Varese	Coxless four
Gold medal – first place	2025 Plovdiv	Coxless four
Silver medal – second place	2017 Račice	Eight
Silver medal – second place	2023 Bled	Coxless pair
Silver medal – second place	2025 Plovdiv	Eight
Bronze medal – third place	2018 Glasgow	Eight
Bronze medal – third place	2022 Oberschleißheim	Coxless pair
Bronze medal – third place	2022 Oberschleißheim	Eight

Ymkje Clevering (born 17 July 1995) is a Dutch rower. She was a member of the Dutch coxless four, along with Ellen Hogerwerf, Karolien Florijn and Veronique Meester, that won an Olympic silver medal in Tokyo 2020. The same crew was a three-time European Champion (in 2019, 2020 and 2021) and won a silver medal at the 2019 World Rowing Championships. In August 2022 Clevering and her former coxless four teammate Veronique Meester won the bronze medal in the coxless pair at the European Championships in Munich.
