= Imogen Magner =

Irish rower (born 1998)

Personal information
- Nationality: Irish
- Born: 8 July 1998 (age 27) Cambridge, England

Sport
- Country: Ireland
- Sport: Rowing
- Event: Coxless 4, coxless pair

Imogen Magner (born 8 July 1998) is an Irish rower. She was selected for the 2024 Paris Olympics.

== Early life ==
She was a junior tennis player and attended the Elite Tennis Academy in Spain. She was later based in Ely, Cambridgeshire, and started rowing in 2016.

== Career ==
Magner was initially part of the British rowing development programme but is eligible to compete for Ireland through her paternal grandfather. She made her first Irish appearance in 2023, winning the pair 'B' final at the European Rowing Championships in Bled, with Natalie Long.

In May 2024, she was part of the Irish women's coxless four that qualified for the Olympic Games at the Olympic Qualification Event in Lucerne. She was subsequently selected for the 2024 Paris Olympics.
