= Jackie Gowler =

New Zealand rower (born 1996)

Personal information
- Nationality: New Zealand
- Born: 7 June 1996 (age 30) Raetihi, New Zealand
- Height: 176 cm (5 ft 9 in)
- Relative: Kerri Williams (sister)

Sport
- Country: New Zealand
- Sport: Rowing
- Event: Eight
Medal record
Women's rowing
Representing New Zealand
Olympic Games
Silver medal – second place	2020 Tokyo	Eight
Bronze medal – third place	2024 Paris	Coxless four
World Championships
Gold medal – first place	2019 Ottensheim	Eight

Jackie Gowler (born 7 June 1996) is a retired New Zealand representative rower.

== Biography ==
Gowler was born in 1996. She received her secondary schooling at Nga Tawa Diocesan School in Marton. While at school, she took up rowing inspired by her elder sister Kerri and trying to outdo her.

Gowler won a gold medal as a member of the women's eight team at the 2019 World Rowing Championships, alongside her sister Kerri.

Gowler announced her retirement from professional rowing on 1 April 2025.
