= Kerri Williams =

New Zealand rower (born 1993)

Kerri Williams MNZM
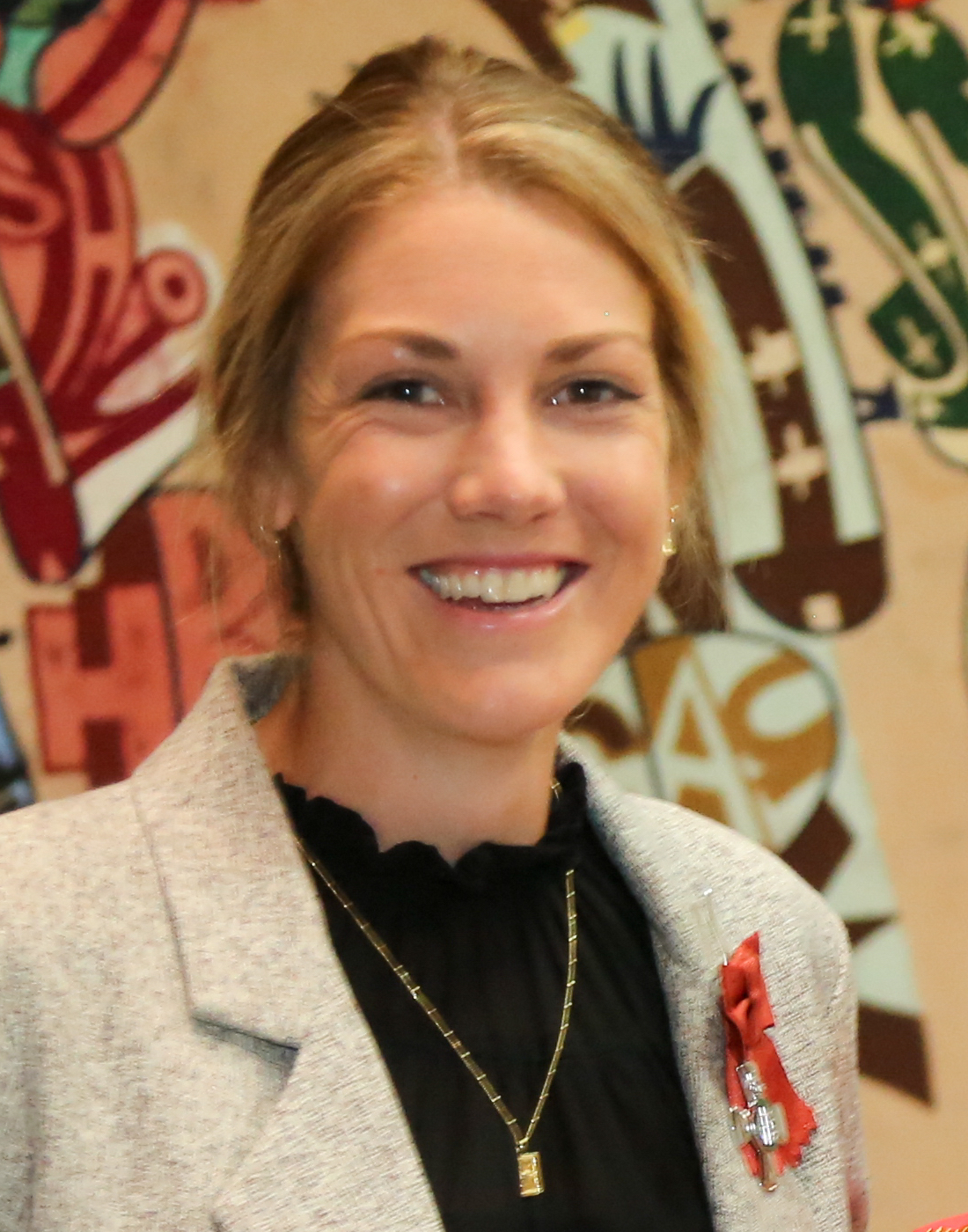
- Williams in 2022

Personal information
- Born: Kerri Leigh Gowler; 18 December 1993 (age 32) Raetihi, New Zealand
- Education: Nga Tawa Diocesan School
- Height: 1.81 m (5 ft 11 in)
- Weight: 76 kg (168 lb)
- Relative: Jackie Gowler (sister)

Sport
- Country: New Zealand
- Sport: Rowing
- Events: Coxless pair, Coxless four, Eight
- Club: Aramaho Wanganui
Medal record
Women's rowing
Representing New Zealand
Olympic Games
Gold medal – first place	2020 Tokyo	Coxless pair
Silver medal – second place	2020 Tokyo	Eight
Bronze medal – third place	2024 Paris	Coxless four
World Championships
Gold medal – first place	2014 Amsterdam	Coxless four
Gold medal – first place	2017 Sarasota	Coxless pair
Gold medal – first place	2019 Ottensheim	Coxless pair
Gold medal – first place	2019 Ottensheim	Eight
Gold medal – first place	2022 Račice	Coxless pair
Silver medal – second place	2018 Plovdiv	Coxless pair
Silver medal – second place	2015 Aiguebelette	Coxless pair
Silver medal – second place	2015 Aiguebelette	Eight

Kerri Leigh Williams MNZM (née Gowler; born 18 December 1993) is a former New Zealand rower. She is a national champion, an Olympic champion and double medallist, a five-time world champion and a current (2019) world champion in both the coxless pair and the women's eight. Williams was born in Raetihi in 1993. She is of Māori descent, affiliating with Rangitāne iwi. She received her education at Nga Tawa Diocesan School in Marton. The school first started to offer a rowing programme in 2008 and a year later, Williams took this up. At the time, she was also competing as an equestrian but soon started focussing on rowing so much that she had to choose one of the sports. Her trainer told her three weeks after she had started rowing that she would one day represent New Zealand. Jackie Gowler, her younger sister by three years, took up rowing in 2010 inspired by her success; they have both made it into the New Zealand national rowing team. Their elder sister, Jaimee Gowler, remains active with horse riding. After school, Williams became a member of the Aramoho Wanganui Rowing Club.

Williams' international career started in 2013 with the women's eight. After participation in two World Rowing Cups she won the B-final at the 2013 World Rowing Championships in Chungju, South Korea. Williams won the gold medal in the coxless four at the 2014 World Rowing Championships in Amsterdam alongside Kayla Pratt, Kelsey Bevan, and Grace Prendergast. With the women's eight, she came fourth at the 2016 Rio Olympics. She is New Zealand Olympian number 1278.

At the 2017 World Rowing Championships, she became world champion in the women's pair partnered with Prendergast. Williams and Prendergast regained that title at the 2019 World Rowing Championships.

Competing at the 2020 Tokyo Olympics at the Sea Forest Waterway, Prendergast and Williams won their heat, the semi-final in a new world best time (beaten ten minutes earlier by Greece in the first semi-final), and the A final, for Olympic gold. They also won the heat in the eight, just three hours after their pair's heat. In the final, the New Zealand eight won silver behind Canada.

In the 2022 Queen's Birthday and Platinum Jubilee Honours, Williams was appointed a Member of the New Zealand Order of Merit, for services to rowing.
