= Jean Mitchell (rower) =

Australian rower

Personal information
- Born: 17 December 1999 (age 25); East Melbourne, Victoria, Australia
- Home town: Melbourne, Victoria, Australia
- Height: 173 cm (5 ft 8 in)

Sport
- Country: Australia
- Sport: Rowing
- Club: Melbourne University Boat Club
- Coached by: Tom Westgarth

Jean Mitchell (born 17 December 1999) is an Australian representative sweep-oar rower. She is an Australian national champion, has represented at senior World Championships and won a gold medal at the 2022 World Rowing Cup.

== Club and state rowing ==
Mitchell was raised in Melbourne and attended Ruyton Girls' School where she took up rowing. She is a brain cancer survivor. Her senior club rowing has been from the Melbourne University Boat Club

At the 2023 Australian Rowing Championships she won the open coxless four national title in an all MUBC crew.

She rowed in the Victorian women's eight to a Queen's Cup victory at the 2022 Interstate Regatta within the Australian Rowing Championships.

== International representative rowing ==
In March 2022, Mitchell was selected in the Australian training squad to prepare for the 2022 international season and the 2022 World Rowing Championships. She rowed in the Australian women's eight at the World Rowing Cups II in Poznann to a bronze medal. At the 2022 World Rowing Championships at Racize, she was again in the Australian women's senior eight. They made the A final and finished in fifth place.

== Personal life ==
Mitchell currently studies a Bachelor of Design (Visual Communication) at Deakin University.
