= Esme Booth =

British rower

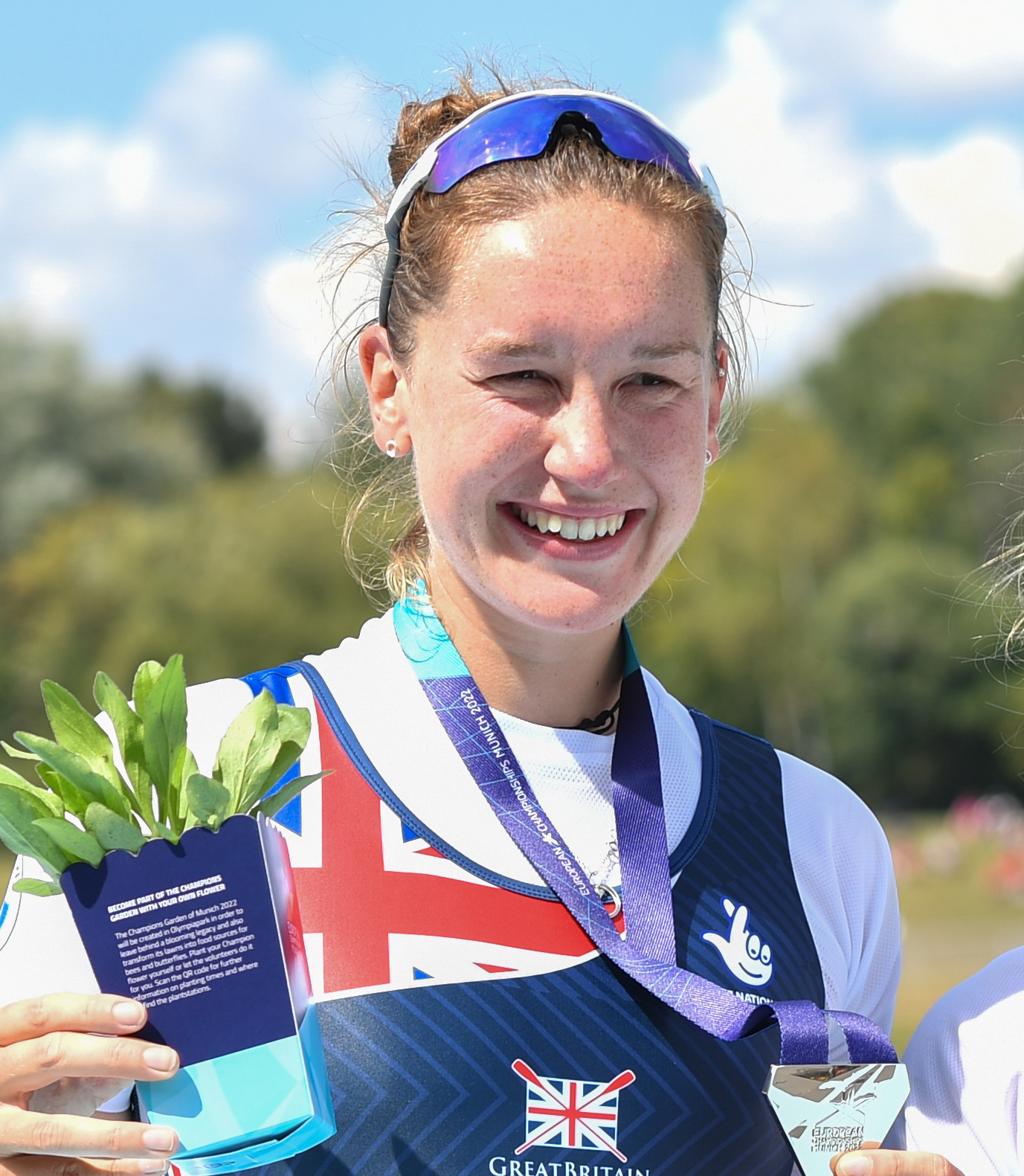
- Booth in 2022

Personal information
- Born: 23 December 1998 (age 27)

Sport
- Sport: Rowing
- Club: OBUBC; Leander Club
Medal record
Women's rowing
Representing Great Britain
Olympic Games
Silver medal – second place	2024 Paris	Coxless four
European Championships
Gold medal – first place	2024 Szeged	Coxless four
Silver medal – second place	2022 Oberschleißheim	Eight
Silver medal – second place	2022 Oberschleißheim	Coxless pair
Silver medal – second place	2023 Bled	Eight

Esme Booth (born 23 December 1998) is a British rower.

== Education ==
Booth is from Stratford-upon-Avon, attended King Edward VI School, Stratford-upon-Avon and studied at Oxford Brookes University, where she competed for the boat club.

== Career ==
Booth represented Great Britain at the 2022 European Rowing Championships in Munich, where she took the silver medal in both the Women's coxless pair and Women's eight events. At the 2023 European Rowing Championships held on Lake Bled, Booth was again part of a British crew that finished runner-up in the Women's eight.
