= Madeleine Wanamaker =

American rower

Personal information
- Nationality: American
- Born: February 14, 1995 (age 31) Neenah, Wisconsin
- Height: 5 ft 11 in (180 cm)

Sport
- Country: United States
- Sport: Rowing
- Events: Coxless four, Coxless pair
- College team: Wisconsin Badgers
Medal record
Women's rowing
Representing the United States
World Championships
Gold medal – first place	2018 Plovdiv	Coxless four
Bronze medal – third place	2022 Račice	Coxless pair

Madeleine Wanamaker (born February 14, 1995) is an American rower. In the 2018 World Rowing Championships, she won a gold medal in the women's coxless four event.

She has qualified to represent the United States at the 2020 Summer Olympics.

In 2025, she won the Hambleden Pairs Challenge Cup with Claire Collins at the Henley Royal Regatta.
