= Davina Waddy =

New Zealand rower

Personal information
- Nationality: New Zealander
- Born: 16 August 1996 (age 30) Christchurch, New Zealand
- Height: 184 cm (6 ft 0 in)

Sport
- Country: New Zealand
- Sport: Rowing
Medal record
Women's rowing
Representing New Zealand
Olympic Games
Bronze medal – third place	2024 Paris	Coxless four

Davina Waddy (born 16 August 1996) is a New Zealand rower. She represented New Zealand at the 2024 Summer Olympics.
