= Claire Collins =

American rower (born 1996)

Personal information
- Born: November 29, 1996 (age 29) Greenbrea, CA, U.S.

Sport
- Country: United States
- Sport: Rowing

Achievements and titles
- Olympic finals: Tokyo 2020 W8+
Medal record
Women's rowing
Representing the United States
World Championships
Bronze medal – third place	2022 Račice	Coxless pair
Bronze medal – third place	2026 Amsterdam	Eight

Claire Collins (born 29 November 1996) is an American rower. She competed at the 2020 and 2024 Summer Olympics.

== Early life ==
From McLean, Virginia, she attended Deerfield Academy and Princeton University. She captained her high school Swimming and volleyball team but excelled at rowing, winning Youth National Championships in 2014 and 2015 in the women’s four event joining the Junior National Team. At the 2012 Junior World Rowing Championships, she won silver in the 8+ in 2012 at 15 years of age. Additionally, she placed fifth in the 8+ in 2013, and won silver in the coxless four in 2014. She graduated from Princeton as a three-time All-American and four-time All-Ivy recipient. In 2019 she was awarded the Otto von Keinbusch award for the top female athlete at Princeton. She was nominated for 2019 NCAA Woman of the Year.

== Career ==
She won silver in the eight at the 2017 World Rowing U23 Championships. She won bronze in the eight at the 2018 World Rowing U23 Championships.

She competed at the 2020 Summer Olympics in Tokyo as part of the women's coxless four, placing seventh overall.

She won bronze in the pair and placed fourth in the eight at the 2022 World Rowing Championships, she also won silver in the pair at the 2022 World Rowing Cup II. She placed fourth in the coxless four at the 2023 World Rowing Championships but won in the four at the 2023 World Rowing Cup.

She competed in the women’s eight at the 2024 Paris Olympics, qualifying for the final, where they placed fifth overall.

In 2025, she won the Hambleden Pairs Challenge Cup with Madeleine Wanamaker at the Henley Royal Regatta. and was in the winning Cambridge crew of the Women's Boat Race.
