= Kristina Walker =

Canadian rower

Personal information
- Born: May 9, 1996 (age 30) Coquitlam, British Columbia, Canada
- Height: 179 cm (5 ft 10 in)
- Weight: 70 kg (154 lb)
Medal record
Women's Rowing
Representing Canada
Olympic Games
Silver medal – second place	2024 Paris	Eight

Kristina Walker (born May 9, 1996) is a Canadian rower. Walker's hometown is Wolfe Island, Ontario.

== Career ==
In June 2021, Walker was named to Canada's 2020 Olympic team in the women's four boat.
