= Heidi Long =

British rower (born 1996)

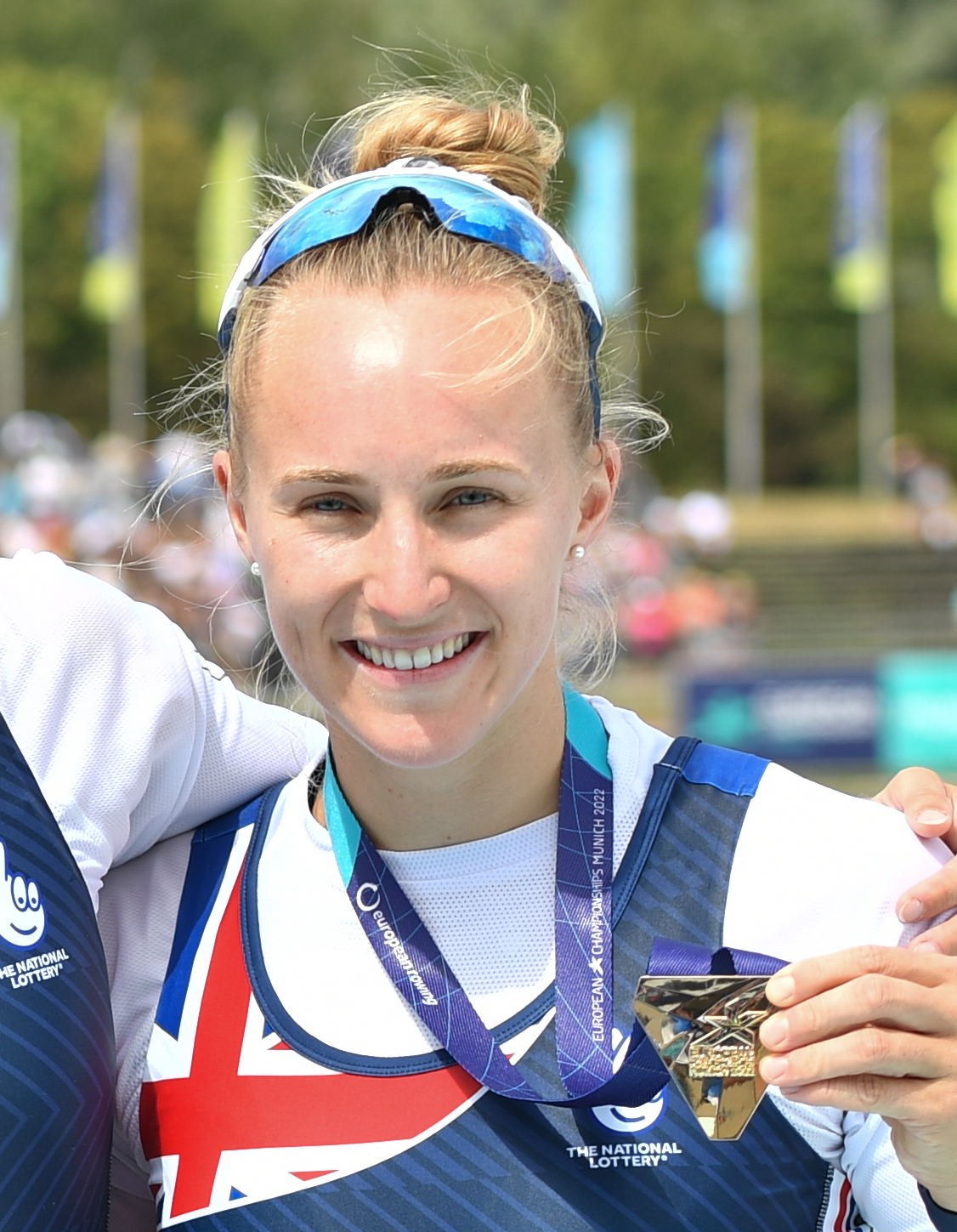
- Long at the 2022 European Championships

Personal information
- Born: 29 November 1996 (age 29) Hillingdon, England
- Home town: Chalfont St Peter, England
- Height: 175 cm (5 ft 9 in)

Sport
- Country: Great Britain
- Sport: Rowing
- College team: Virginia Cavaliers (2015–2019)
- Club: Leander Club
Medal record
Women's rowing
Representing Great Britain
Olympic Games
Bronze medal – third place	2024 Paris	Eight
World Championships
Gold medal – first place	2022 Račice	Coxless four
Silver medal – second place	2026 Amsterdam	Eight
Bronze medal – third place	2023 Belgrade	Coxless four
Bronze medal – third place	2025 Shanghai	Eight
European Championships
Gold medal – first place	2022 Oberschleißheim	Coxless four
Gold medal – first place	2025 Plovdiv	Eight
Silver medal – second place	2022 Oberschleißheim	Eight
Silver medal – second place	2023 Bled	Coxless four
Silver medal – second place	2024 Szeged	Eight
Silver medal – second place	2026 Varese	Eight
Bronze medal – third place	2025 Plovdiv	Coxless four

Heidi Long (born 29 November 1996) is a British rower.

== Career ==
Long won a gold medal in the coxless four at the 2022 European Rowing Championships and the 2022 World Rowing Championships.

At the 2023 World Rowing Championships in Belgrade, she won the World Championship bronze medal in the women's coxless four.

She won a bronze medal as part of the Great Britain eight at the 2024 Summer Olympics.

Long became the President of the Oxford University Boat Club for the 2025-26 season. She rowed in the stroke seat of the Oxford Women’s Blue Boat in the 80th Women’s Boat Race on 4 April 2026. Oxford won for the first time since 2016 by 3 lengths.
