= Natalie Long =

Irish rower (born 1990)

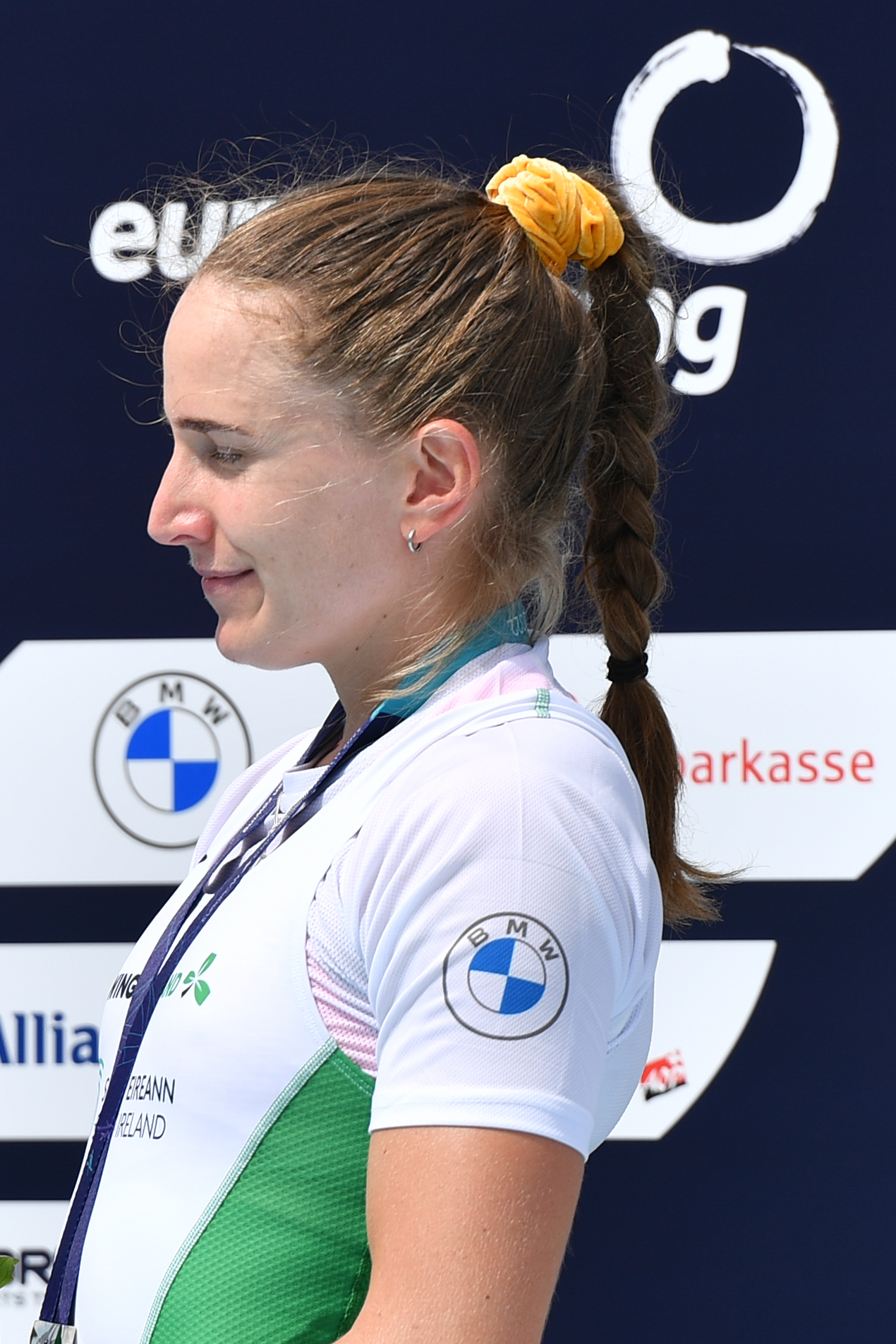
- Long in 2022

Personal information
- Full name: Natalie Claire Long
- Nationality: Irish
- Born: 13 June 1990 (age 36) South Africa

Sport
- Sport: Rowing
- Events: coxless four, coxless pairs, single scull
- Club: Lee Valley Rowing Club; Skibbereen Rowing Club; Killorglin Rowing Club
Medal record
Women's rowing
Representing Ireland
European Championships
Silver medal – second place	2022 Munich	Coxless four

Natalie Claire Long (born 13 June 1990) is an Irish rower.

With Sadhbh O'Connor she competed in the Hambleden Pairs Challenge Cup at the 2019 Henley Royal Regatta. She was an alternate for the Irish team at the 2019 World Rowing Championships.

She won a silver medal in the coxless four event at the 2022 European Rowing Championships.
