= Kelsey Reelick =

American rower

Personal information
- Nationality: American
- Born: November 6, 1991 (age 33)

Sport
- Country: United States
- Sport: Rowing

Kelsey Reelick (/ˈriːlɪk/ REE-lik; born November 6, 1991) is an American rower. She represented the United States at the 2024 Summer Olympics.
