= 2022 World Rowing Championships =

International rowing event

- Location: Račice, Czech Republic
- Dates: 18–25 September 2022

The 2022 World Rowing Championships were held from 18 to 25 September 2022 in Račice, Czech Republic.

== Medal summary ==
=== Medal table ===
* Host nation (Czech Republic)

Rank	Nation	Gold	Silver	Bronze	Total
1	Great Britain	7	1	4	12
2	Italy	5	3	1	9
3	Romania	4	0	0	4
4	Netherlands	2	8	1	11
5	France	2	1	2	5
6	Ukraine	2	0	5	7
7	Ireland	2	0	2	4
8	Germany	1	1	3	5
9	New Zealand	1	1	1	3
10	China	1	1	0	2
10	Poland	1	1	0	2
12	Norway	1	0	0	1
13	Australia	0	4	4	8
14	United States	0	2	1	3
15	Spain	0	2	0	2
16	Brazil	0	1	0	1
16	Greece	0	1	0	1
16	Hungary	0	1	0	1
19	Canada	0	0	1	1
19	Czech Republic*	0	0	1	1
19	Slovenia	0	0	1	1
Totals (21 entries)		29	28	27	84

Non-Olympic/Paralympic classes

=== Men ===
Event	Gold		Silver		Bronze	
Openweight events
M1x	Oliver Zeidler; Germany	6:48.67	Melvin Twellaar; Netherlands	6:50.12	Graeme Thomas; Great Britain	6:51.44
M2x	France; Hugo Boucheron; Matthieu Androdias	6:09.34	Spain; Aleix García; Rodrigo Conde	6:10.52	Australia; David Bartholot; Caleb Antill	6:11.92
M4x	Poland; Dominik Czaja; Mateusz Biskup; Mirosław Ziętarski; Fabian Barański	5:40.08	Great Britain; Harry Leask; George Bourne; Matthew Haywood; Tom Barras	5:40.97	Italy; Nicolò Carucci; Andrea Panizza; Luca Chiumento; Giacomo Gentili	5:42.14
M2−	Romania; Marius Cozmiuc; Sergiu Bejan	6:28.06	Spain; Jaime Canalejo; Javier García	6:29.27	Great Britain; Oliver Wynne-Griffith; Tom George	6:30.86
M4−	Great Britain; William Stewart; Sam Nunn; David Ambler; Freddie Davidson	5:48.29	Australia; Alexander Purnell; Spencer Turrin; Jack Hargreaves; Joseph O'Brien	5:50.48	Netherlands; Ralf Rienks; Ruben Knab; Sander de Graaf; Rik Rienks	5:51.85
M8+	Great Britain; Rory Gibbs; Morgan Bolding; David Bewicke-Copley; Sholto Carnegie; Charles Elwes; Thomas Digby; James Rudkin; Thomas Ford; Harry Brightmore	5:24.41	Netherlands; Niki van Sprang; Lennart van Lierop; Abe Wiersma; Jacob van de Kerkhof; Michiel Mantel; Mick Makker; Guus Mollee; Guillaume Krommenhoek; Dieuwke Fetter	5:25.52	Australia; Rohan Lavery; Nicholas Lavery; Henry Youl; Ben Canham; Angus Widdicombe; Sam Hardy; William O'Shannessy; Jackson Kench; Kendall Brodie	5:27.72
Lightweight events
LM1x	Gabriel Soares; Italy	7:03.40	Antonios Papakonstantinou; Greece	7:05.42	Rajko Hrvat; Slovenia	7:08.66
LM2x	Ireland; Fintan McCarthy; Paul O'Donovan	6:16.46	Italy; Pietro Ruta; Stefano Oppo	6:19.11	Ukraine; Stanislav Kovalov; Ihor Khmara	6:19.53
LM4x	Italy; Antonio Vicino; Alessandro Benzoni; Niels Torre; Patrick Rocek	5:56.66	China; Sun Man; Chen Sensen; Jiang Xuke; Ma Yule	5:59.27	Germany; Johannes Ursprung; Simon Klüter; Fabio Kress; Joachim Agne	5:59.47
LM2−	Italy; Alessandro Durante; Giovanni Ficarra	6:47.69	Hungary; Bence Szabó; Kálmán Furkó	6:51.49	Czech Republic; Jiří Kopáč; Milan Viktora	6:51.64

=== Women ===
Event	Gold		Silver		Bronze	
Openweight events
W1x	Karolien Florijn; Netherlands	7:31.66	Emma Twigg; New Zealand	7:34.03	Tara Rigney; Australia	7:36.96
W2x	Romania; Ancuța Bodnar; Simona Radiș	6:47.77	Netherlands; Roos de Jong; Laila Youssifou	6:51.02	Ireland; Sanita Pušpure; Zoe Hyde	6:52.81
W4x	China; Chen Yunxia; Zhang Ling; Lü Yang; Cui Xiaotong	6:17.49	Netherlands; Nika Johanna Vos; Tessa Dullemans; Ilse Kolkman; Bente Paulis	6:18.68	Great Britain; Jessica Leyden; Lola Anderson; Georgina Brayshaw; Lucy Glover	6:21.05
W2−	New Zealand; Grace Prendergast; Kerri Williams	7:03.76	Netherlands; Ymkje Clevering; Veronique Meester	7:06.02	United States; Madeleine Wanamaker; Claire Collins	7:08.03
W4−	Great Britain; Heidi Long; Rowan McKellar; Samantha Redgrave; Rebecca Shorten	6:26.40	Netherlands; Marloes Oldenburg; Benthe Boonstra; Hermine Catherine Drenth; Tinka Offereins	6:28.62	Australia; Lucy Stephan; Katrina Werry; Bronwyn Cox; Annabelle McIntyre	6:29.29
W8+	Romania; Maria-Magdalena Rusu; Iuliana Buhuș; Adriana Ailincăi; Maria Tivodariu; Mădălina Bereș; Amalia Bereș; Ioana Vrînceanu; Simona Radiș; Victoria-Ștefania Petreanu	6:01.14	Netherlands; Benthe Boonstra; Laila Youssifou; Hermine Drenth; Marloes Oldenburg; Roos de Jong; Tinka Offereins; Ymkje Clevering; Veronique Meester; Aniek van Veenen	6:05.04	Canada; Jessica Sevick; Gabrielle Smith; Morgan Rosts; Kirsten Edwards; Alexis Cronk; Kasia Gruchalla-Wesierski; Avalon Wasteneys; Sydney Payne; Kristen Kit	6:07.51
Lightweight events
LW1x	Ionela-Livia Cozmiuc; Romania	7:42.59	Martine Veldhuis; Netherlands	7:44.48	Jackie Kiddle; New Zealand	7:44.98
LW2x	Great Britain; Emily Craig; Imogen Grant	6:54.78	United States; Mary Reckford; Michelle Sechser	6:57.92	Ireland; Aoife Casey; Margaret Cremen	7:00.62
LW4x	Italy; Ilaria Corazza; Giulia Mignemi; Silvia Crosio; Arianna Noseda	6:38.14	Not awarded			
LW2−	Italy; Maria Zerboni; Samantha Premerl	7:38.19	United States; Solveig Imsdahl; Elaine Tierney	7:43.84	Germany; Sophia Wolf; Eva Hohoff	7:54.97

=== Pararowing ===
Event	Gold		Silver		Bronze	
PR1M1x	Roman Polianskyi; Ukraine	9:03.74	Giacomo Perini; Italy	9:08.12	Benjamin Pritchard; Great Britain	9:11.90
PR2M1x	Corné de Koning; Netherlands	8:52.37	Gian Filippo Mirabile; Italy	9:03.33	Paul Umbach; Germany	9:21.12
PR3M2−	Great Britain; Oliver Stanhope; Edward Fuller	6:53.68	Australia; Nicholas Neales; James Talbot	7:21.02	Ukraine; Andrii Syvykh; Dmytro Herez	7:29.07
PR1W1x	Birgit Skarstein; Norway	10:07.58	Nathalie Benoit; France	10:13.10	Anna Sheremet; Ukraine	10:17.45
PR2W1x	Katie O'Brien; Ireland	9:25.23	Kathryn Ross; Australia	9:35.35	Anna Aisanova; Ukraine	10:09.24
PR3W2−	Great Britain; Francesca Allen; Giedrė Rakauskaitė	7:50.89	Australia; Alex Vuillermin; Alexandra Viney	8:03.02	Not awarded	
PR2Mix2x	Ukraine; Svitlana Bohuslavska; Iaroslav Koiuda	8:24.47	Poland; Jolanta Majka; Michał Gadowski	8:26.95	France; Perle Bouge; Stéphane Tardieu	8:28.81
PR3Mix2x	France; Elur Alberdi; Laurent Cadot	7:35.04	Brazil; Diana Barcelos de Oliveira; Valdeni da Silva Junior	7:37.16	Ukraine; Dariia Kotyk; Stanislav Samoliuk	7:37.18
PR3Mix4+	Great Britain; Francesca Allen; Giedrė Rakauskaitė; Edward Fuller; Oliver Stanhope; Morgan Baynham-Williams	6:48.34	Germany; Susanne Lackner; Jan Helmich; Marc Lembeck; Kathrin Marchand; Inga Thöne	7:06.94	France; Erika Sauzeau; Margot Boulet; Rémy Taranto; Laurent Cadot; Émilie Acquistapace	7:11.41

== Participating nations ==
63 countries participated in this championship; athlete numbers are shown in brackets.

- Algeria (4)
- Argentina (2)
- Australia (53)
- Austria (18)
- Azerbaijan (1)
- Belgium (7)
- Benin (1)
- Brazil (8)
- Bulgaria (3)
- Canada (33)
- China (50)
- Chinese Taipei (3)
- Croatia (7)
- Cuba (4)
- Cyprus (1)
- Czech Republic (39)
- Denmark (16)
- Egypt (8)
- Estonia (6)
- Finland (5)
- France (34)
- Georgia (1)
- Germany (45)
- Great Britain (45)
- Greece (9)
- Hong Kong (7)
- Hungary (12)
- Indonesia (10)
- Iran (3)
- Ireland (24)
- Iraq (2)
- Israel (4)
- Italy (62)
- Ivory Coast (2)
- Japan (11)
- Kazakhstan (4)
- Lebanon (1)
- Lithuania (17)
- Mexico (16)
- Moldova (4)
- Monaco (1)
- Netherlands (42)
- New Zealand (22)
- Norway (16)
- Palestine (1)
- Poland (30)
- Portugal (4)
- Romania (35)
- Serbia (6)
- Sri Lanka (2)
- Slovakia (2)
- Slovenia (5)
- South Africa (11)
- Spain (24)
- Sweden (2)
- Switzerland (24)
- Tunisia (4)
- Turkey (5)
- Ukraine (35)
- United States (72)
- Uruguay (1)
- Uzbekistan (8)
- Zimbabwe (1)
- Belarusian and Russian athletes were banned as a result of the Russian invasion of Ukraine.
