= Račice (Litoměřice District) =

- Municipality
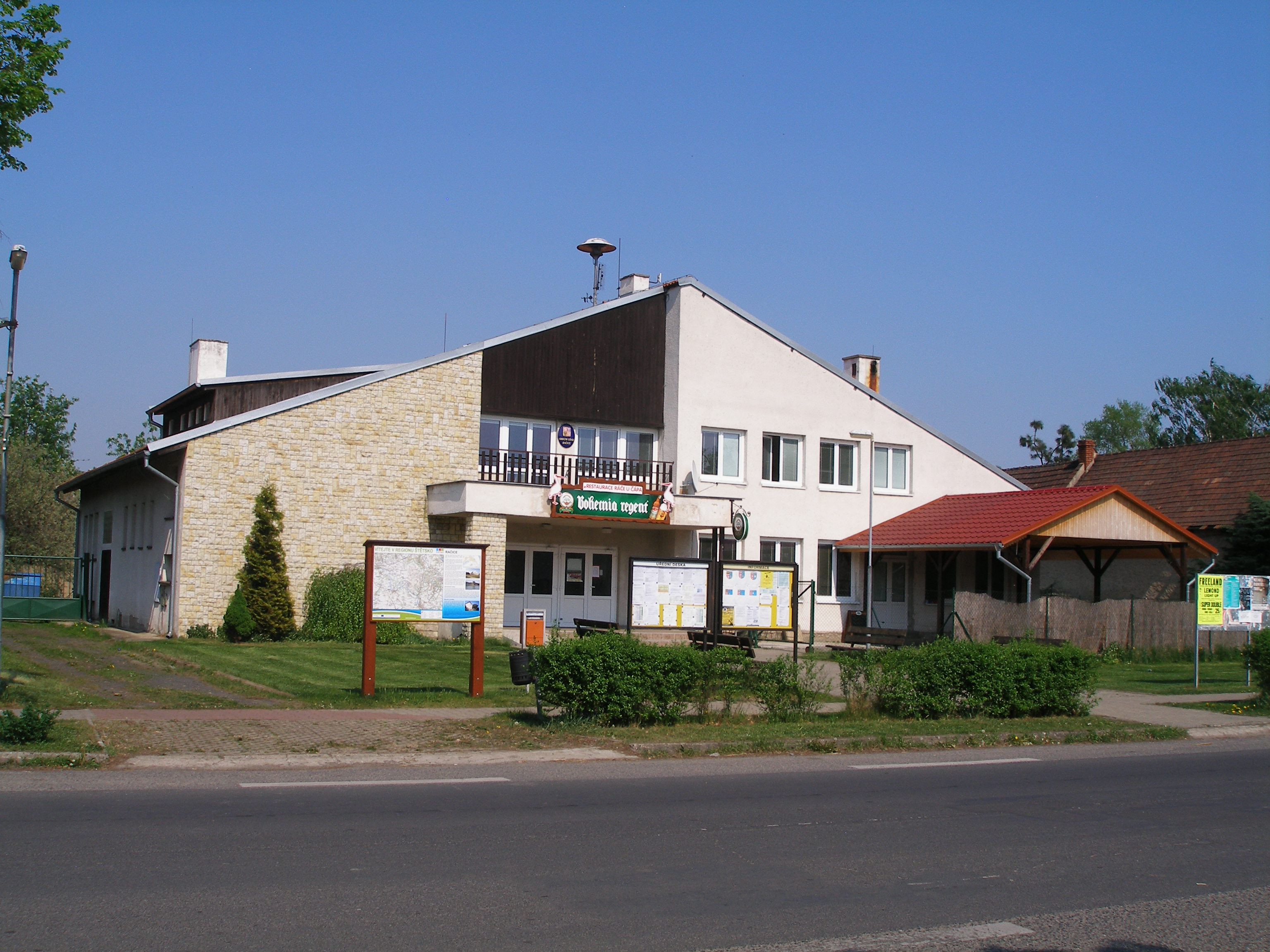
- Municipal office

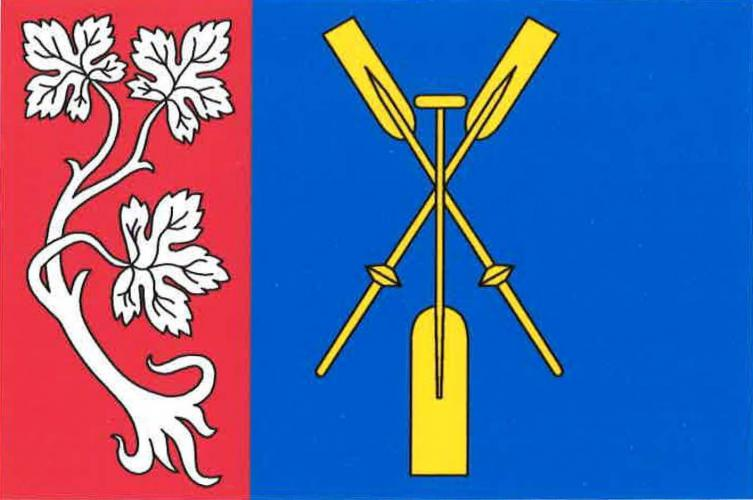
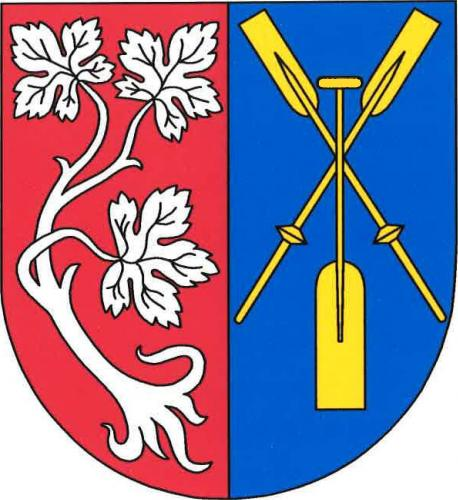
- Flag Coat of arms

- Location in the Czech Republic
- Coordinates: 50°27′41″N 14°21′4″E
- Country: Czech Republic
- Region: Ústí nad Labem
- District: Litoměřice
- First mentioned: 1295

Area
  - Total: 5.30 km^{2} (2.05 sq mi)
- Elevation: 158 m (518 ft)

Population (2026-01-01)
  - Total: 418
  - Density: 78.9/km^{2} (204/sq mi)
- Time zone: UTC+1 (CET)
  - Summer (DST): UTC+2 (CEST)
- Postal code: 411 08
- Website: www.racice.cz

Račice (German: Ratschitz) is a municipality and village in Litoměřice District in the Ústí nad Labem Region of the Czech Republic. It has about 400 inhabitants. It is a major rowing and flatwater canoeing venue.

== Etymology ==
The name is derived from the personal name Radek, meaning "the village of Radek's people". It was originally written as Radčice.

== Geography ==
Račice is located about 17 kilometres (11 mi) southeast of Litoměřice, 31 km (19 mi) southeast of Ústí nad Labem and 39 km (24 mi) north of Prague. It lies in the Lower Ohře Table. The municipality is situated in a meander of the Elbe River on its left bank, and this river forms part of the municipal border.

== History ==
The first written mention of Račice is from 1268.

== Demographics ==
Historical population

Year	Pop.	±%
1869	272	—
1880	266	−2.2%
1890	299	+12.4%
1900	330	+10.4%
1910	417	+26.4%

Year	Pop.	±%
1921	411	−1.4%
1930	386	−6.1%
1950	315	−18.4%
1961	347	+10.2%
1970	364	+4.9%

Year	Pop.	±%
1980	341	−6.3%
1991	269	−21.1%
2001	308	+14.5%
2011	319	+3.6%
2021	355	+11.3%

Source: Censuses

== Transport ==
The railway line from Prague to Ústí nad Labem runs through the municipality, but there is no train station. The municipality is served by the station in the neighbouring village of Hněvice (part of Štětí).

== Sport ==
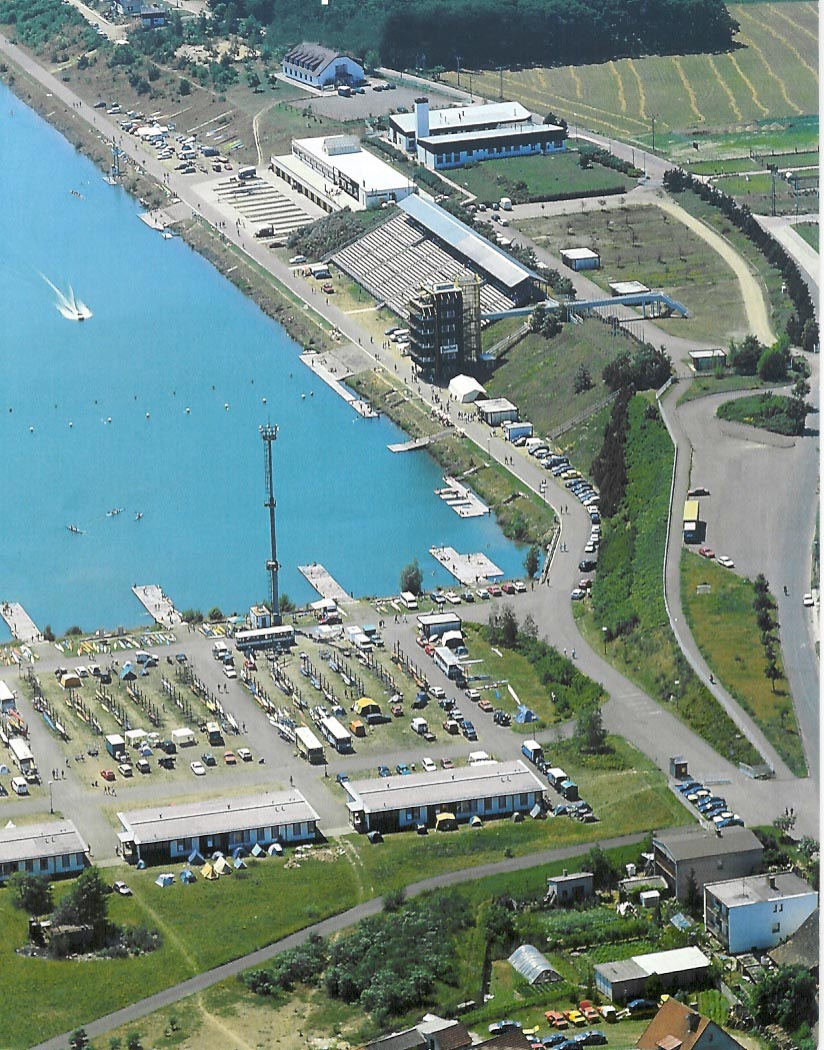
Račice rowing centre

Račice is the major rowing and flatwater canoeing venue in the country. The municipality hosted the 1993 World Rowing Championships, the 2006 and 2015 Canoe Sprint European Championships, the 2017 ICF Canoe Sprint World Championships, the 2017 European Rowing Championships and the 2022 World Rowing Championships.

== Sights ==
There are no cultural monuments in the municipality.
