= 2019 World Rowing Championships – Women's coxless pair =

Women's coxless pair at the 2019 World Rowing Championships
- Venue: Linz-Ottensheim
- Location: Ottensheim, Austria
- Dates: 25–31 August
- Competitors: 50 from 25 nations
- Winning time: 7:21.35

Medalists
gold medal	Grace Prendergast; Kerri Gowler	New Zealand
silver medal	Jessica Morrison; Annabelle McIntyre	Australia
bronze medal	Caileigh Filmer; Hillary Janssens	Canada

The women's coxless pair competition at the 2019 World Rowing Championships took place at the Linz-Ottensheim regatta venue. A top-eleven finish ensured qualification for the Tokyo Olympics.

== Schedule ==
The schedule was as follows:

Date	Time	Round
Sunday 25 August 2019	10:06	Heats
Monday 26 August 2019	12:02	Repechage
Wednesday 28 August 2019	10:49	Quarterfinals
Thursday 29 August 2019	10:01	Semifinals C/D
Thursday 29 August 2019	10:02	Semifinals A/B
Friday 30 August 2019	09:35	Final D
Saturday 31 August 2019	09:53	Final C
Saturday 31 August 2019	11:00	Final B
Saturday 31 August 2019	13:21	Final A

All times are Central European Summer Time (UTC+2)

== Results ==
=== Heats ===
The four fastest boats in each heat advanced directly to the quarterfinals. The remaining boats were sent to the repechage.

==== Heat 1 ====
Rank	Rowers	Country	Time	Notes
1	Caileigh Filmer; Hillary Janssens	Canada	7:09.45	Q
2	Kiri Tontodonati; Aisha Rocek	Italy	7:13.23	Q
3	Anna Wierzbowska; Monika Sobieszek	Poland	7:26.13	Q
4	Siri Eva Kristiansen; Hanna Inntjore	Norway	7:29.27	Q
5	Lucie Žabová; Anna Žabová	Czech Republic	7:29.94	R

==== Heat 2 ====
Rank	Rowers	Country	Time	Notes
1	Jessica Morrison; Annabelle McIntyre	Australia	7:14.75	Q
2	Oksana Holub; Olena Buryak	Ukraine	7:19.73	Q
3	Anna Schanze; Tabea Schendekehl	Germany	7:21.91	Q
4	Elena Daniliuk; Ekaterina Glazkova	Russia	7:27.33	Q
5	Trine Dahl Pedersen; Nina Hollensen	Denmark	7:31.61	R

==== Heat 3 ====
Rank	Rowers	Country	Time	Notes
1	Aina Cid; Virginia Díaz	Spain	7:13.12	Q
2	Cristina-Georgiana Popescu; Amalia Bereş	Romania	7:14.49	Q
3	Samantha Courty; Annie Withers	Great Britain	7:25.06	Q
4	Dóra Polivka; Eszter Krémer	Hungary	7:30.75	Q
5	Fernanda Ceballos; Maite Arrillaga	Mexico	8:01.52	R

==== Heat 4 ====
Rank	Rowers	Country	Time	Notes
1	Megan Kalmoe; Tracy Eisser	United States	7:12.76	Q
2	Aileen Crowley; Monika Dukarska	Ireland	7:13.30	Q
3	Melita Abraham; Antonia Abraham	Chile	7:17.42	Q
4	Tayla-May Bentley; Jessica Schoonbee	South Africa	7:22.62	Q
5	Hermijntje Drenth; Kirsten Wielaard	Netherlands	7:31.85	R

==== Heat 5 ====
Rank	Rowers	Country	Time	Notes
1	Grace Prendergast; Kerri Gowler	New Zealand	7:13.98	Q
2	Maria Kyridou; Christina Bourmpou	Greece	7:22.86	Q
3	Lin Xinyu; Ju Rui	China	7:24.68	Q
4	Noémie Kober; Marie Le Nepvou	France	7:28.31	Q
5	Zana Krakic; Izabela Krakic	Croatia	7:35.21	R

=== Repechage ===
The four fastest boats advanced to the quarterfinals. The remaining boat took no further part in the competition.

Rank	Rowers	Country	Time	Notes
1	Lucie Žabová; Anna Žabová	Czech Republic	7:27.71	Q
2	Trine Dahl Pedersen; Nina Hollensen	Denmark	7:28.75	Q
3	Hermijntje Drenth; Kirsten Wielaard	Netherlands	7:31.60	Q
4	Zana Krakic; Izabela Krakic	Croatia	7:34.77	Q
5	Fernanda Ceballos; Maite Arrillaga	Mexico	7:57.24	

=== Quarterfinals ===
The three fastest boats in each quarter advanced to the A/B semifinals. The remaining boats were sent to the C/D semifinals.

==== Quarterfinal 1 ====
Rank	Rowers	Country	Time	Notes
1	Caileigh Filmer; Hillary Janssens	Canada	7:10.96	SA/B
2	Maria Kyridou; Christina Bourmpou	Greece	7:13.24	SA/B
3	Samantha Courty; Annie Withers	Great Britain	7:14.25	SA/B
4	Oksana Holub; Olena Buryak	Ukraine	7:15.95	SC/D
5	Tayla-May Bentley; Jessica Schoonbee	South Africa	7:25.14	SC/D
6	Hermijntje Drenth; Kirsten Wielaard	Netherlands	7:28.61	SC/D

==== Quarterfinal 2 ====
Rank	Rowers	Country	Time	Notes
1	Jessica Morrison; Annabelle McIntyre	Australia	7:08.74	SA/B
2	Aileen Crowley; Monika Dukarska	Ireland	7:12.51	SA/B
3	Kiri Tontodonati; Aisha Rocek	Italy	7:13.11	SA/B
4	Lucie Žabová; Anna Žabová	Czech Republic	7:25.60	SC/D
5	Dóra Polivka; Eszter Krémer	Hungary	7:25.94	SC/D
6	Noémie Kober; Marie Le Nepvou	France	7:34.33	SC/D

==== Quarterfinal 3 ====
Rank	Rowers	Country	Time	Notes
1	Grace Prendergast; Kerri Gowler	New Zealand	7:07.36	SA/B
2	Aina Cid; Virginia Díaz	Spain	7:13.08	SA/B
3	Melita Abraham; Antonia Abraham	Chile	7:14.64	SA/B
4	Anna Schanze; Tabea Schendekehl	Germany	7:16.18	SC/D
5	Zana Krakic; Izabela Krakic	Croatia	7:31.15	SC/D
6	Siri Eva Kristiansen; Hanna Inntjore	Norway	7:36.72	SC/D

==== Quarterfinal 4 ====
Rank	Rowers	Country	Time	Notes
1	Megan Kalmoe; Tracy Eisser	United States	7:09.35	SA/B
2	Cristina-Georgiana Popescu; Amalia Bereş	Romania	7:12.68	SA/B
3	Lin Xinyu; Ju Rui	China	7:14.49	SA/B
4	Anna Wierzbowska; Monika Sobieszek	Poland	7:22.18	SC/D
5	Trine Dahl Pedersen; Nina Hollensen	Denmark	7:28.31	SC/D
6	Elena Daniliuk; Ekaterina Glazkova	Russia	7:32.83	SC/D

=== Semifinals C/D ===
The three fastest boats in each semi were sent to the C final. The remaining boats were sent to the D final.

==== Semifinal 1 ====
Rank	Rowers	Country	Time	Notes
1	Oksana Holub; Olena Buryak	Ukraine	7:16.90	FC
2	Trine Dahl Pedersen; Nina Hollensen	Denmark	7:21.01	FC
3	Lucie Žabová; Anna Žabová	Czech Republic	7:22.76	FC
4	Hermijntje Drenth; Kirsten Wielaard	Netherlands	7:25.48	FD
5	Zana Krakic; Izabela Krakic	Croatia	7:30.73	FD
6	Siri Eva Kristiansen; Hanna Inntjore	Norway	7:33.63	FD

==== Semifinal 2 ====
Rank	Rowers	Country	Time	Notes
1	Anna Schanze; Tabea Schendekehl	Germany	7:20.78	FC
2	Anna Wierzbowska; Monika Sobieszek	Poland	7:22.41	FC
3	Tayla-May Bentley; Jessica Schoonbee	South Africa	7:22.95	FC
4	Dóra Polivka; Eszter Krémer	Hungary	7:28.51	FD
5	Noémie Kober; Marie Le Nepvou	France	7:30.67	FD
6	Elena Daniliuk; Ekaterina Glazkova	Russia	7:31.52	FD

=== Semifinals A/B ===
The three fastest boats in each semi advanced to the A final. The remaining boats were sent to the B final.

==== Semifinal 1 ====
Rank	Rowers	Country	Time	Notes
1	Jessica Morrison; Annabelle McIntyre	Australia	6:58.00	FA
2	Caileigh Filmer; Hillary Janssens	Canada	7:00.45	FA
3	Aina Cid; Virginia Díaz	Spain	7:03.16	FA
4	Cristina-Georgiana Popescu; Amalia Bereş	Romania	7:04.34	FB
5	Melita Abraham; Antonia Abraham	Chile	7:12.80	FB
6	Samantha Courty; Annie Withers	Great Britain	7:20.97	FB

==== Semifinal 2 ====
Rank	Rowers	Country	Time	Notes
1	Grace Prendergast; Kerri Gowler	New Zealand	6:57.92	FA
2	Megan Kalmoe; Tracy Eisser	United States	7:01.78	FA
3	Kiri Tontodonati; Aisha Rocek	Italy	7:01.80	FA
4	Aileen Crowley; Monika Dukarska	Ireland	7:03.05	FB
5	Lin Xinyu; Ju Rui	China	7:05.78	FB
6	Maria Kyridou; Christina Bourmpou	Greece	7:22.12	FB

=== Finals ===
The A final determined the rankings for places 1 to 6. Additional rankings were determined in the other finals.

==== Final D ====
Rank	Rowers	Country	Time
1	Hermijntje Drenth; Kirsten Wielaard	Netherlands	7:29.31
2	Noémie Kober; Marie Le Nepvou	France	7:29.67
3	Dóra Polivka; Eszter Krémer	Hungary	7:32.91
4	Zana Krakic; Izabela Krakic	Croatia	7:33.11
5	Elena Daniliuk; Ekaterina Glazkova	Russia	7:34.76
6	Siri Eva Kristiansen; Hanna Inntjore	Norway	7:35.43

==== Final C ====
Rank	Rowers	Country	Time
1	Oksana Holub; Olena Buryak	Ukraine	7:13.78
2	Anna Wierzbowska; Monika Sobieszek	Poland	7:15.23
3	Anna Schanze; Tabea Schendekehl	Germany	7:15.90
4	Tayla-May Bentley; Jessica Schoonbee	South Africa	7:19.86
5	Trine Dahl Pedersen; Nina Hollensen	Denmark	7:21.97
6	Lucie Žabová; Anna Žabová	Czech Republic	7:25.03

==== Final B ====
Rank	Rowers	Country	Time
1	Cristina-Georgiana Popescu; Amalia Bereş	Romania	7:18.88
2	Aileen Crowley; Monika Dukarska	Ireland	7:20.68
3	Lin Xinyu; Ju Rui	China	7:21.36
4	Samantha Courty; Annie Withers	Great Britain	7:22.46
5	Maria Kyridou; Christina Bourmpou	Greece	7:22.89
6	Melita Abraham; Antonia Abraham	Chile	7:23.02

==== Final A ====
Rank	Rowers	Country	Time
1st place, gold medalist(s)	Grace Prendergast; Kerri Gowler	New Zealand	7:21.35
2nd place, silver medalist(s)	Jessica Morrison; Annabelle McIntyre	Australia	7:23.62
3rd place, bronze medalist(s)	Caileigh Filmer; Hillary Janssens	Canada	7:26.52
4	Megan Kalmoe; Tracy Eisser	United States	7:32.25
5	Aina Cid; Virginia Díaz	Spain	7:38.14
6	Kiri Tontodonati; Aisha Rocek	Italy	7:40.35
