= 2018 World Rowing Championships – Women's coxless pair =

Women's coxless pair at the 2018 World Rowing Championships
- Venue: Plovdiv Regatta Venue
- Location: Plovdiv, Bulgaria
- Dates: 9–15 September
- Competitors: 30 from 15 nations
- Winning time: 6:50.67

Medalists
gold medal	Caileigh Filmer; Hillary Janssens	Canada
silver medal	Grace Prendergast; Kerri Gowler	New Zealand
bronze medal	Anna Boada; Aina Cid	Spain

The women's coxless pair competition at the 2018 World Rowing Championships in Plovdiv took place at the Plovdiv Regatta Venue.

== Schedule ==
The schedule was as follows:

Date	Time	Round
Sunday 9 September 2018	10:34	Heats
Tuesday 11 September 2018	10:49	Repechage
Thursday 13 September 2018	11:18	Semifinals A/B
Saturday 15 September 2018	09:38	Final B
Saturday 15 September 2018	11:30	Final A
Saturday 15 September 2018	14:45	Final C

All times are Eastern European Summer Time (UTC+3)

== Results ==
=== Heats ===
The three fastest boats in each heat advanced directly to the A/B semifinals. The remaining boats were sent to the repechage.

==== Heat 1 ====
Rank	Rowers	Country	Time	Notes
1	Grace Prendergast; Kerri Gowler	New Zealand	6:56.06	SA/B
2	Aifric Keogh; Emily Hegarty	Ireland	7:11.51	SA/B
3	Victoria Opitz; Gia Doonan	United States	7:13.02	SA/B
4	Addy Dunkley-Smith; Hannah Vermeersch	Australia	7:16.10	R
5	Oksana Holub; Anna Kontseva	Ukraine	7:17.16	R

==== Heat 2 ====
Rank	Rowers	Country	Time	Notes
1	Rowan McKellar; Harriet Taylor	Great Britain	7:07.92	SA/B
2	Lin Xinyu; Ju Rui	China	7:09.73	SA/B
3	Alessandra Patelli; Sara Bertolasi	Italy	7:11.85	SA/B
4	Hermijntje Drenth; Willeke Vossen	Netherlands	7:23.18	R
5	Anna Aksenova; Valentina Plaksina	Russia	7:23.20	R

==== Heat 3 ====
Rank	Rowers	Country	Time	Notes
1	Caileigh Filmer; Hillary Janssens	Canada	7:09.23	SA/B
2	Anna Boada; Aina Cid	Spain	7:15.71	SA/B
3	Dóra Polivka; Eszter Krémer	Hungary	7:27.64	SA/B
4	Flavie Bahuaud; Marie Le Nepvou	France	7:34.99	R
5	Anna Wierzbowska; Monika Sobieszek	Poland	7:55.26	R

=== Repechage ===
The three fastest boats advanced to the A/B semifinals. The remaining boats were sent to the C final.

Rank	Rowers	Country	Time	Notes
1	Anna Aksenova; Valentina Plaksina	Russia	7:14.15	SA/B
2	Addy Dunkley-Smith; Hannah Vermeersch	Australia	7:14.88	SA/B
3	Oksana Holub; Anna Kontseva	Ukraine	7:17.23	SA/B
4	Hermijntje Drenth; Willeke Vossen	Netherlands	7:17.54	FC
5	Anna Wierzbowska; Monika Sobieszek	Poland	7:27.78	FC
6	Flavie Bahuaud; Marie Le Nepvou	France	7:37.08	FC

=== Semifinals ===
The three fastest boats in each semi advanced to the A final. The remaining boats were sent to the B final.

==== Semifinal 1 ====
Rank	Rowers	Country	Time	Notes
1	Caileigh Filmer; Hillary Janssens	Canada	6:58.57	FA
2	Grace Prendergast; Kerri Gowler	New Zealand	7:00.32	FA
3	Lin Xinyu; Ju Rui	China	7:14.48	FA
4	Addy Dunkley-Smith; Hannah Vermeersch	Australia	7:17.40	FB
5	Oksana Holub; Anna Kontseva	Ukraine	7:24.72	FB
6	Dóra Polivka; Eszter Krémer	Hungary	7:32.07	FB

==== Semifinal 2 ====
Rank	Rowers	Country	Time	Notes
1	Aifric Keogh; Emily Hegarty	Ireland	7:14.67	FA
2	Alessandra Patelli; Sara Bertolasi	Italy	7:14.99	FA
3	Anna Boada; Aina Cid	Spain	7:15.30	FA
4	Victoria Opitz; Gia Doonan	United States	7:16.61	FB
5	Rowan McKellar; Harriet Taylor	Great Britain	7:17.95	FB
6	Anna Aksenova; Valentina Plaksina	Russia	7:29.11	FB

=== Finals ===
The A final determined the rankings for places 1 to 6. Additional rankings were determined in the other finals.

==== Final C ====
Rank	Rowers	Country	Time
1	Anna Wierzbowska; Monika Sobieszek	Poland	7:20.04
2	Hermijntje Drenth; Willeke Vossen	Netherlands	7:22.35
3	Flavie Bahuaud; Marie Le Nepvou	France	7:30.83

==== Final B ====
Rank	Rowers	Country	Time
1	Rowan McKellar; Harriet Taylor	Great Britain	7:17.46
2	Addy Dunkley-Smith; Hannah Vermeersch	Australia	7:18.94
3	Victoria Opitz; Gia Doonan	United States	7:19.70
4	Oksana Holub; Anna Kontseva	Ukraine	7:24.76
5	Anna Aksenova; Valentina Plaksina	Russia	7:27.48
6	Dóra Polivka; Eszter Krémer	Hungary	7:36.96

==== Final A ====
Rank	Rowers	Country	Time
1st place, gold medalist(s)	Caileigh Filmer; Hillary Janssens	Canada	6:50.67
2nd place, silver medalist(s)	Grace Prendergast; Kerri Gowler	New Zealand	6:52.96
3rd place, bronze medalist(s)	Anna Boada; Aina Cid	Spain	7:04.60
4	Alessandra Patelli; Sara Bertolasi	Italy	7:06.91
5	Lin Xinyu; Ju Rui	China	7:11.31
6	Aifric Keogh; Emily Hegarty	Ireland	7:15.70
