= Heather Stanning =

British rower

Major Heather Stanning OBE
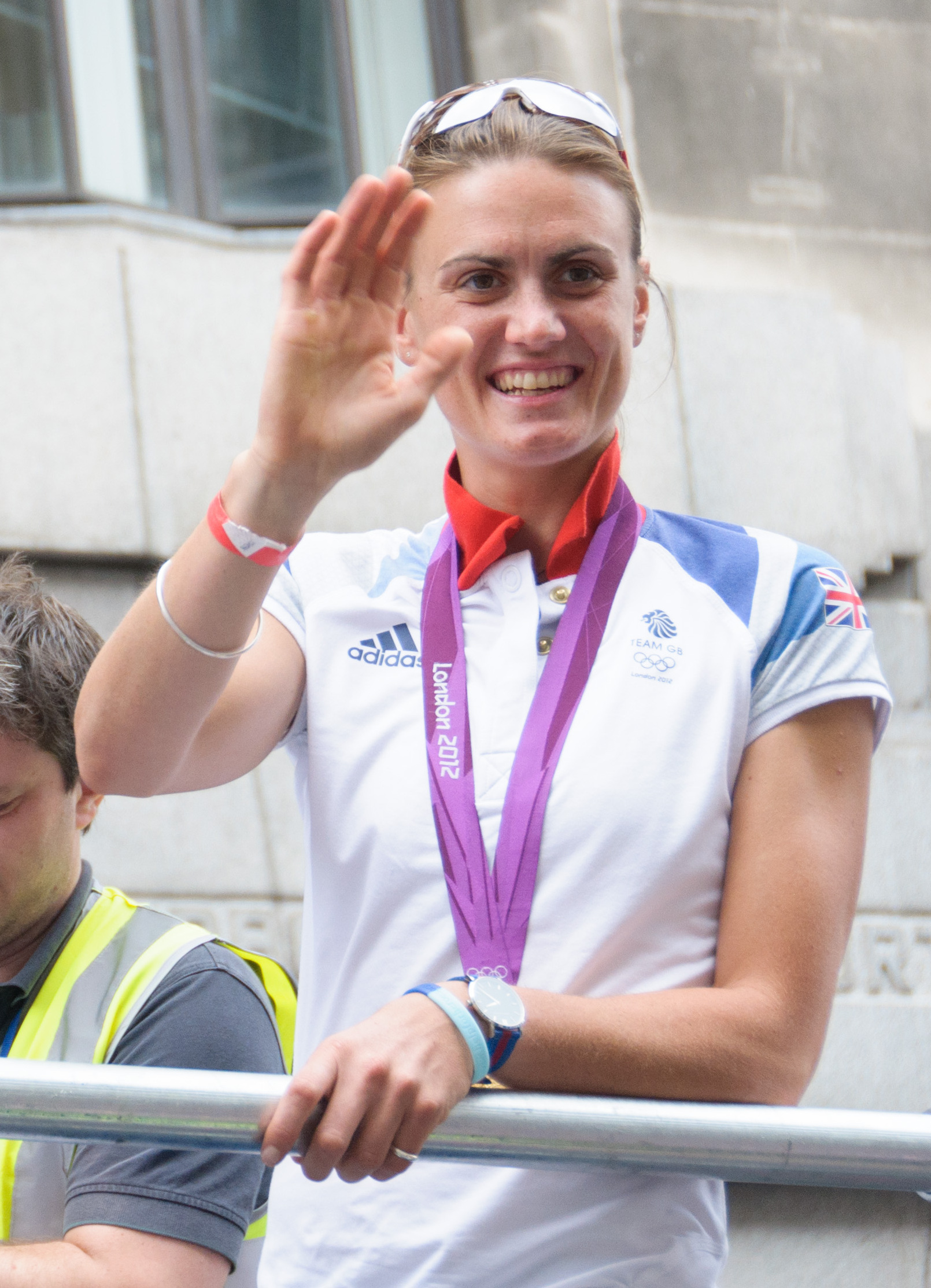

Personal information
- Full name: Heather Mary Stanning
- Nationality: British
- Born: 26 January 1985 (age 41) Yeovil, Somerset, England
- Height: 181 cm (5 ft 11 in) (2012)
- Weight: 75 kg (165 lb) (2012)

Sport
- Country: Great Britain
- Sport: Rowing
- Event: Women's coxless pair
- Turned pro: 2009
- Partner: Helen Glover
Medal record
Women's rowing
Representing Great Britain
Olympic Games
Gold medal – first place	2012 London	W2-
Gold medal – first place	2016 Rio de Janeiro	W2-
World Championships
Gold medal – first place	2014 Amsterdam	W2−
Gold medal – first place	2015 Aiguebelette	W2–
Silver medal – second place	2010 Lake Karapiro	W2-
Silver medal – second place	2011 Lake Bled	W2-
World Rowing Cup
Gold medal – first place	2011 Munich	W2-
Gold medal – first place	2011 Lucerne	W2-
Gold medal – first place	2012 Belgrade	W2-
Gold medal – first place	2012 Lucerne	W2-
Gold medal – first place	2012 Munich	W2-
Gold medal – first place	2014 Lac d'Aiguebelette	W2-
Gold medal – first place	2014 Lucerne	W2-
Gold medal – first place	2015 Lake Varese	W2-
Gold medal – first place	2015 Lucerne	W2-
Gold medal – first place	2016 Poznań	W2-
European Championships
Gold medal – first place	2015 Poznań	W2−
Gold medal – first place	2016 Brandenburg an der Havel	W2−
World Rowing U23 Championships
Gold medal – first place	2007 Glasgow	W2−

Major Heather Mary Stanning (born 26 January 1985) is a retired British professional rower. As a member of the Great Britain rowing team, she is a double Olympic champion, double World champion, quadruple World Cup champion and double European champion. She has also been a British champion in both women's fours and quad sculls.

Paired with Helen Glover in 2012, she won an Olympic gold medal, the first for their country of the 2012 Olympiad and the first ever British Olympic gold medal in women's rowing. She set the world record time in partnership with Helen Glover at the 2014 World Rowing Championships in Amsterdam, and they retained their World title at the 2015 World Rowing Championships in Lac d'Aiguebelette, France.

In 2016, they retained their European title at Brandenburg an der Havel, set the World Rowing Cup record time at Poznań and again won gold at the Olympics in Rio de Janeiro. She was ranked the number 1 female rower in the world in 2016 and announced her retirement from rowing in November 2016.

She is a British army officer and currently holds the rank of major in the Royal Artillery; she was given dispensation from the army to pursue an Olympic career with the British team at the 2012 Summer Olympics in London and the 2016 Summer Olympics.

== Personal life ==
Stanning was born in Yeovil, Somerset, England; her parents Timothy (Lieutenant Commander) and Mary were Royal Navy officers. She was educated at Gordonstoun, Scotland, where she was appointed head girl in her final year. Her school yearbook predicted that she would win an Olympic gold medal.

Whilst in sixth form she won a British Army scholarship and went on to study sports technology at the University of Bath, England. She started rowing in 2006 under the Team GB Start Programme. She graduated from university in 2007 before going on to Sandhurst alongside her brother, Martin, who joined the Black Watch. Another brother, Alistair, is a Royal Navy doctor. On 18 August 2018 she announced her marriage to Jonny Howse, a British army officer; they married at Elgin Cathedral, Scotland.

== Career ==
Stanning was commissioned from Sandhurst into the Royal Artillery in August 2008, based at Larkhill Garrison on Salisbury Plain, Wiltshire. She held the rank of Captain and served in 32nd Regiment Royal Artillery. She was promoted to major in December 2015 and from February 2017 resumed work full-time in the army before attending Staff College in September 2017.

=== 2006–2009 ===
In 2006 Stanning started rowing and was selected for Team GB "Start" programme where she was coached by Paul Stannard. In 2007, she partnered Olivia Whitlam to win the women's pair competition at the World Rowing U23 Championships. In 2008, she won the Remenham Challenge Cup for women's eights at the Henley Royal Regatta. In 2009, she tried out for TeamGB and joined the crew of the women's eight with Victoria Bryant, Ruth Walczak, Victoria Meyer-Laker, Monica Relph, Jaqueline Round, Leonora Kennedy, Rachael Jefferies and Zoe de Toledo. They finished seventh at the European Rowing Championships held in Brest, Belarus.

=== 2010 ===
Stanning was given leave from the army in 2010 to train for Olympic competition and was paired with Helen Glover in the women's coxless pair. At the 2010 World Rowing Cup they finished 9th in Bled and 5th in Munich, but were unable to race at Lucerne due to Glover's illness.

In July Glover and Stanning started to be coached by Robin Williams. They were ranked 16th and 17th in their event and were also regarded as reserves for the women's eight. They improved so rapidly that at the 2010 World Rowing Championships at Lake Karapiro in New Zealand in November they won a silver medal behind Juliette Haigh and Rebecca Scown of New Zealand.

=== 2011 ===
In 2011 Glover and Stanning won the coxless pair event at the GB Rowing Team Senior Trials at Eton-Dorney with a time of 7 minutes 15 seconds. They went on to win both the Munich and Lucerne World Rowing Cup regattas, beating the reigning world champions Haigh and Scown of New Zealand. Great Britain did not enter round 2 of the World Cup in Hamburg due to an E. coli outbreak in the area.

Glover and Stanning finished second in the 2011 World Rowing Championships at Lake Bled, Slovenia, 0.1 seconds behind the winning New Zealand crew of Haigh and Scown, despite both getting a stomach bug when they arrived in Slovenia. Their coach Robin Williams described it as a gold medal performance without getting the gold medal. In 2015, after retaining their world championship, Stanning said “Thinking back four years we were clear water ahead but lost it on the line. We certainly haven’t forgotten that lesson.

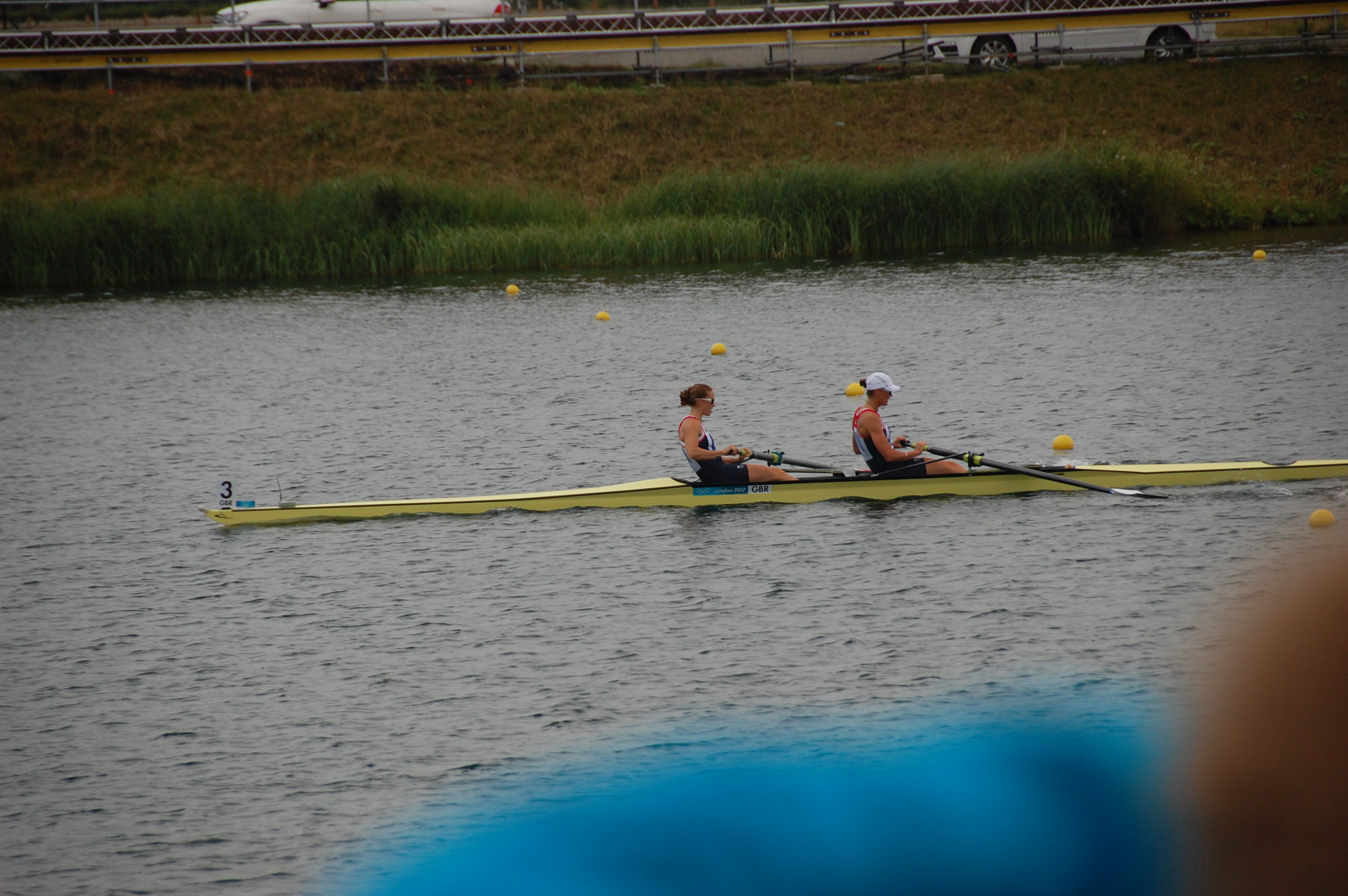
Helen Glover and Heather Stanning at Dorney Lake during the 2012 Summer Olympics.

=== 2012 ===
In 2012 Glover and Stanning completed a clean sweep of all three events in the women's coxless pair of the World Rowing Cup. Winning gold at Belgrade Sava, Serbia; Lucerne Rotsee, Switzerland; and Munich Oberschleissheim, Germany.

On 1 August 2012 Glover and Stanning won the gold medal in the women's coxless pair at the 2012 Summer Olympics. This was Team GB's first gold medal of London 2012, and a first ever Olympic gold medal for British women's rowing. As with other gold medal winners, Royal Mail issued a commemorative stamp showing their celebrations, plus painting a post box gold in her home town of Lossiemouth to commemorate the event. After the race, the BBC played a message to Stanning from her regiment, which was deployed in Afghanistan.

Her commanding officer, Lieutenant Colonel Craig Palmer, who gave her leave for training, said “I wish to congratulate Heather and Helen on their success; it was an excellent achievement. Soldiers from 32nd Regiment Royal Artillery were thrilled to watch the race from their bases in Afghanistan, while their friends and families watched it here in the UK. I am sure that they have been inspired by her performance and we look forward to welcoming her back to the Regiment later this year. I know that she is keen to deploy with her soldiers to Helmand in 2013.”

The Regimental Colonel of the Royal Artillery, Colonel Roddy Lee said: We are immensely proud of Captain Stanning. She is a credit to the Royal Regiment of Artillery, to the Army and to the nation.

In September 2012 Stanning reported to Larkhill garrison and resumed her British Army career. She was posted to Helmand Province in Afghanistan where she worked as an Operations officer for the iUAS (Intelligent Unmanned Aircraft Systems). She completed her tour of duty in the summer of 2013, and returned to training in December.

=== 2014 ===
On 17 March 2014 Stanning was part of the composite crew that won the Women's Eights Head of the River Race on the River Thames in London, setting a record time of 17:42.2 for the 4 1/4-mile (6.8 km) Championship Course from Mortlake to Putney. The crew comprised Heather Stanning – Army RC; Beth Rodford – Gloucester RC; Zoe Lee – Imperial College BC; Jessica Eddie – London RC; Helen Glover – Minerva Bath Rowing Club; Olivia Carnegie-Brown – Oxford Brookes University BC; Tina Stiller – Tees RC; Caragh McMurtry – Reading University BC; cox Phelan Hill – Leander Club.

On 19 April 2014 Helen Glover and Stanning, coached by Paul Thompson, won the women's pair at the British rowing trials at Caversham, they took seven minutes 56.08 seconds and finished 1.14 seconds ahead of Polly Swann and Jessica Eddie. Stanning said "It was brilliant to be back racing with Helen. It feels like old times, but at the same time it's so refreshing because we've both learnt new things while we've been apart." In May Stanning's training schedule was reduced in intensity, causing her to be replaced in the European Championships by Polly Swann.

Teamed with Helen Glover in the women's coxless pair, Stanning won gold at the second and third rounds of the World Rowing Cup at Lac d'Aiguebelette in France in June and Lucerne Rotsee on 13 July, which also clinched the overall title despite TeamGB not entering the first event in Australia in March. At Aiguebelette they qualified directly for the final which they completed in 7 minutes 6.9 seconds, finishing two seconds ahead of the Americans Grace Luczak and Caroline Lind. At Lucerne they again qualified directly for the final which, despite Glover's illness, they completed in 7 minutes 12.99 seconds, finishing a length ahead of the New Zealand 2 crew of Grace Prendergast and Kerri Gowler.

On 30 September Stanning, partnered by Helen Glover, retained her world title at the 2014 World Rowing Championships held at the Bosbaan, Amsterdam. They won both their heat and the semi-final and set a new world record time of 6:50.61 in the final, breaking the 2002 time by three seconds. They defeated the silver medallists, Megan Kalmoe and Kerry Simmonds of the United States, by over two seconds. Glover said: "I knew we were ready but there was so much expectation, so winning is definitely a relief."

At the British Rowing Championships on 18–19 October at Holme Pierrepont (Nottingham), Stanning was part of the composite crew that won gold in both the women's fours sweep event and the quad sculls. Racing under the acronym LIMA, the crew comprised: Jessica Eddie – London RC; Zoe Lee – Imperial College BC; Helen Glover – Minerva-Bath RC; and Heather Stanning – Army RC.

=== 2015 ===
On 14 March 2015 Stanning was part of the composite crew that won the Women's Eights Head of the River Race on the River Thames in London, setting a time of 18:58.6 for the 4 1/4-mile (6.8 km) Championship Course from Mortlake to Putney. The crew comprised: Heather Stanning – Army RC; Helen Glover – Minerva-Bath RC; Zoe Lee – Imperial College BC; Katherine Grainger – Marlow RC; Melanie Wilson; Caragh McMurtry – Southampton Coalporters ARC; Olivia Carnegie-Brown – Oxford Brookes University BC; Jessica Eddie – London RC; cox Phelan Hill – Leander Club.

On 19 April 2015 Helen Glover and Stanning won the women's pair at the British rowing trials at Caversham, they took seven minutes 36.09 seconds and finished ten seconds ahead of Jessica Eddie and Louisa Reeve, followed by Katie Greves and Zoe Lee. Glover said: We not only have great respect for each other as athletes but we are great friends on and off the water. I can genuinely say I want to win these races as much for Heather as for myself. We know how much we put into every session – it isn’t just our day job, it’s our passion.

On 31 May Stanning, partnered by Helen Glover, won her first European title at the 2015 European Rowing Championships held in Poznań, Poland. They won both their heat and the semi-final and set a new European record time of 6:58.28 in the final. They defeated the silver medallists, Noemie Kober and Marie Le Nepvou of the Netherlands, by over six seconds. Glover said: It's good to keep them tallying up and keep it exciting, but we don't go flat out on the start line thinking the aim of the day is to break records. Quadruple Olympic gold medallist Sir Matthew Pinsent, reporting in The Times, described Glover and Stanning as Within reach of sporting immortality.

On 21 June, Glover and Stanning won gold in the women's coxless pair at the second round of the World Rowing Cup at Lake Varese in Italy. Their winning time, 06:53.67, was half a second off the World Cup Best Time, defeating Megan Kalmoe and Kerry Simmonds of USA 2 by 1.6 seconds, less than a length. On 12 July they again won gold at the third round of the World Rowing Cup, at Lake Rotsee in Lucerne, which also gave them overall victory in the World Cup series, Glover's fifth series win in five years. They finished in 6:57.59 minutes, defeating Grace Prendergast and Kerri Gowler of New Zealand by 2.7 seconds.

Glover and Stanning retained their World title at the 2015 World Rowing Championships in Lac d'Aiguebelette, France, on 5 September. They won their heat in 7:04 minutes and qualified directly for the semi-final which they won in 07:06 minutes. They led the final from the start and finished in 6:52.99, 2 seconds outside their own world record, defeating the New Zealand silver medalists, Grace Prendergast and Kerri Gowler, by 3.8 seconds. Multiple Olympic gold medalist Sir Steve Redgrave said "Glover and Stanning dominate any combination that is put up against them.", whilst their coach Robin Williams said “The coach shouldn’t be that impressed I suppose, since I see them every day, but I’m just lost for words, quite stunning.”. Sir David Tanner, Britain's rowing chief, declared it “one of the best GB performances of all-time … utterly exceptional,”.

After retaining her world title in 2015, Stanning was officially ranked #6 female rower in the world by World Rowing, between Victoria Opitz of the US and Zoe Stevenson of New Zealand. Her partner, Helen Glover, was ranked #1.

On 20 November 2015, the World Rowing Federation (FISA) announced that Glover and Stanning had won the award for '2015 World Rowing Female Crew of the Year'. Also on 20 November Stanning was named as “Olympic Athlete of the Year” at the GB Rowing Teams awards. Sir David Tanner, GB Rowing Team Performance Director, said "Heather displays an exemplary attitude of hard work, self-discipline, teamwork in all that she does and thoroughly deserves this accolade”

=== 2016 ===
Glover and Stanning were the dominant women's pair in the GB Team Selection Trials held at the Redgrave Pinsent Rowing Lake at Caversham over 22–23 March 2016. They finished in 7 minutes 13 seconds, ten seconds ahead of Polly Swann and Jessica Eddie. Glover commented that it was "... the start of the season, rather than a peak ..." and Stanning noted their "great working combination with coach Robin (Williams)," and the "excitement of getting back into the boat each year."

On 8 May 2016 Glover and Stanning won the European Rowing Championships at Brandenburg an der Havel to retain their European title. In windy conditions they completed the final in 7 minutes 35.93 seconds, eight seconds ahead of Kerstin Hartmann and Kathrin Marchand of Germany. Glover told the BBC that "There were waves coming over my back at the start but racing here has up-skilled us. We may have cross-wind conditions at the Rio Olympics so it was good to race in them."

In the World Rowing Cup II at Lucerne, Switzerland, from 27–29 May, Glover and Stanning won both their heat and their semi-final but were unable to start in the final due to Stanning's sickness.

On 19 June 2016 Glover and Stanning won the final of the World Cup III event at Poznań, Poland, setting a new World Cup Best time of 6 minutes 52.79 seconds to finish 1.6 seconds ahead of the newly crowned World Cup Champions - Genevieve Behrent and Rebecca Scown of New Zealand. Although undefeated in the World Cup series, Glover and Stanning did not enter the first round at Varese, and did not start the final of round II at Lucerne due to sickness, thus they did not accrue sufficient points for overall series victory.

On 12 August 2016 Glover and Stanning retained their Olympic women's Pair title at the 2016 Summer Olympics in Rio de Janeiro.

in November 2016, Stanning announced her retirement from rowing and returned to active military service full time 2017.

== Honours ==
Stanning was appointed Member of the Order of the British Empire (MBE) in the 2013 New Year Honours and Officer of the Order of the British Empire (OBE) in the 2017 Birthday Honours, both for services to rowing.

In September 2016, Stanning was awarded the freedom of the Scottish region of Moray.

The University of Bath awarded Stanning an Honorary Doctorate of Law in July 2018.

== Achievements ==
2010

- 9th – World Rowing Cup, Bled, coxless pair.
- 5th – World Rowing Cup, Munich, coxless pair.
- 2nd – 2010 World Rowing Championships, Lake Karapiro, New Zealand, coxless pair.

2011

- 1st – GB Rowing Team Senior Trials, Eton-Dorney, coxless pair.
- 1st – World Rowing Cup, Munich, coxless pair.
- 1st – World Rowing Cup, Lucerne, coxless pair.
- 2nd – 2011 World Rowing Championships, Lake Bled Slovenia, coxless pair.

2012

- 1st – GB Rowing Team Trials, Eton Dorney, 10–11 March, coxless pair.
- 1st – World Rowing Cup, Belgrade, coxless pair.
- 1st – World Rowing Cup, Lucerne, coxless pair.
- 1st – World Rowing Cup, Munich, coxless pair.
- 1st – 2012 Summer Olympics, London, 1 August, Coxless pair. Olympic record time.

2014

- 1st – Women's Eights Head of the River Race, River Thames, 17 March, women's eight.
- 1st – GB Rowing Team Senior Trials, Redgrave Pinsent Rowing Lake, 19 April, coxless pair.
- 1st – World Rowing Cup, Lac d'Aiguebelette, France, June, coxless pair.
- 1st – World Rowing Cup, Lucerne Rotsee, 13 July, coxless pair.
- 1st – 2014 World Rowing Championships, Bosbaan, Amsterdam, 30 August, coxless pair. World-record time.
- 1st – British Rowing Championships, Holme Pierrepont, 18–19 October, women's fours.
- 1st – British Rowing Championships, Holme Pierrepont, 18–19 October, quad sculls.

2015

- 1st – Women's Eights Head of the River Race, River Thames, 14 March, women's eight.
- 1st – GB Rowing Team Senior Trials, Redgrave Pinsent Rowing Lake, 19 April, coxless pair.
- 1st – European Rowing Championships, Poznań, Poland, 31 May, coxless pair.
- 1st – World Rowing Cup, Lake Varese, 21 July, coxless pair.
- 1st – World Rowing Cup, Lucerne Rotsee, 12 July, coxless pair.
- 1st – 2015 World Rowing Championships, Lac d'Aiguebelette, France, 5 September, coxless pair.

2016

- 1st – GB Rowing Team Senior Trials, Redgrave Pinsent Rowing Lake, 22–23 March, coxless pair.
- 1st – European Rowing Championships, Brandenburg an der Havel, Germany, 8 May, coxless pair.
- 1st – Heat and semi-final, World Rowing Cup 11, Lucerne, May, coxless pair. (Did not start Final due to sickness).
- 1st – World Rowing Cup III, Poznań, Poland, 19 June, coxless pair.
- 1st – 2016 Summer Olympics, Rio de Janeiro, 12 August, Coxless pair.

== See also ==
- 2012 Olympics gold post boxes in the United Kingdom
