= Rowing at the 2020 Summer Olympics – Women's coxless pair =

Olympic rowing event

Women's coxless pair at the Games of the XXXII Olympiad
- Olympic rowing
- Venue: Sea Forest Waterway
- Dates: 24–29 July 2021
- Competitors: 26 from 13 nations
- Winning time: 6:50.19

Medalists
1st place, gold medalist(s)		Grace Prendergast; Kerri Gowler	New Zealand
2nd place, silver medalist(s)		Vasilisa Stepanova; Elena Oriabinskaia	ROC
3rd place, bronze medalist(s)		Caileigh Filmer; Hillary Janssens	Canada

The women's coxless pair event at the 2020 Summer Olympics took place from 24 to 29 July 2021 at the Sea Forest Waterway. 26 rowers from 13 nations competed.

== Schedule ==
The competition was held over six days.

All times are Japan Standard Time (UTC+9)

Date	Time	Round
Saturday, 24 July 2021	9:20	Heats
Sunday, 25 July 2021	9:50	Repechage
Wednesday, 28 July 2021	12:20	Semifinals A/B*
Thursday, 29 July 2021	8:40	Final B*
Thursday, 29 July 2021	9:30	Final A

^{* Event has been rescheduled.}

== Results ==
=== Heats ===
The first three of each heat qualified for the semifinals, while the remainder went to the repechage.

==== Heat 1 ====
Rank	Lane	Rower	Nation	Time	Notes
1	4	Caileigh Filmer; Hillary Janssens	Canada	7:18.34	Q
2	2	Adriana Ailincăi; Iuliana Buhuș	Romania	7:20.36	Q
3	3	Kiri Tontodonati; Aisha Rocek	Italy	7:22.79	Q
4	1	Megan Kalmoe; Tracy Eisser	United States	7:26.95	R
5	5	Maria Kyridou; Christina Bourmpou	Greece	7:33.94	R

==== Heat 2 ====
Rank	Lane	Rower	Nation	Time	Notes
1	3	Jessica Morrison; Annabelle McIntyre	Australia	7:21.75	Q
2	1	Vasilisa Stepanova; Elena Oriabinskaia	ROC	7:23.39	Q
3	2	Helen Glover; Polly Swann	Great Britain	7:23.98	Q
4	4	Huang Kaifeng; Liu Jinchao	China	7:45.55	R

==== Heat 3 ====
Rank	Lane	Rower	Nation	Time	Notes
1	2	Grace Prendergast; Kerri Gowler	New Zealand	7:19.08	Q
2	3	Hedvig Rasmussen; Fie Udby Erichsen	Denmark	7:22.86	Q
3	1	Aina Cid; Virginia Díaz Rivas	Spain	7:23.14	Q
4	4	Aileen Crowley; Monika Dukarska	Ireland	7:24.71	R

=== Repechage ===
The first three pairs in the repechage qualified for the semifinals, while the fourth pair was eliminated.

Rank	Lane	Rower	Nation	Time	Notes
1	4	Maria Kyridou; Christina Bourmpou	Greece	7:28.00	Q
2	1	Megan Kalmoe; Tracy Eisser	United States	7:29.87	Q
3	2	Aileen Crowley; Monika Dukarska	Ireland	7:31.99	Q
4	3	Huang Kaifeng; Liu Jinchao	China	7:45.17	

=== Semifinals ===
==== Semifinal A/B 1 ====
Rank	Lane	Rower	Nation	Time	Notes
1	6	Maria Kyridou; Christina Bourmpou	Greece	6:48.70 WB	FA
2	2	Helen Glover; Polly Swann	Great Britain	6:49.39	FA
3	3	Caileigh Filmer; Hillary Janssens	Canada	6:49.46	FA
4	4	Jessica Morrison; Annabelle McIntyre	Australia	6:49.82	FB
5	1	Aileen Crowley; Monika Dukarska	Ireland	7:06.07	FB
6	5	Hedvig Rasmussen; Fie Udby Erichsen	Denmark	7:08.44	FB

==== Semifinal A/B 2 ====
Rank	Lane	Rower	Nation	Time	Notes
1	4	Grace Prendergast; Kerri Gowler	New Zealand	6:47.41 WB	FA,
2	5	Vasilisa Stepanova; Elena Oriabinskaia	ROC	6:50.24	FA
3	6	Aina Cid; Virginia Díaz Rivas	Spain	6:50.63	FA
4	3	Adriana Ailincăi; Iuliana Buhuș	Romania	6:58.55	FB
5	1	Megan Kalmoe; Tracy Eisser	United States	7:02.52	FB
6	2	Kiri Tontodonati; Aisha Rocek	Italy	7:04.52	FB

=== Finals ===
==== Final B ====
Rank	Lane	Rower	Nation	Time	Notes
7	3	Jessica Morrison; Annabelle McIntyre	Australia	6:56.46	
8	6	Hedvig Rasmussen; Fie Udby Erichsen	Denmark	6:59.48	
9	4	Adriana Ailincăi; Iuliana Buhuș	Romania	7:01.02	
10	2	Megan Kalmoe; Tracy Eisser	United States	7:02.16	
11	5	Aileen Crowley; Monika Dukarska	Ireland	7:02.22	
12	1	Kiri Tontodonati; Aisha Rocek	Italy	7:04.46	

==== Final A ====
Rank	Lane	Rower	Nation	Time	Notes
1st place, gold medalist(s)	4	Grace Prendergast; Kerri Gowler	New Zealand	6:50.19	
2nd place, silver medalist(s)	5	Vasilisa Stepanova; Elena Oriabinskaia	ROC	6:51.45	
3rd place, bronze medalist(s)	1	Caileigh Filmer; Hillary Janssens	Canada	6:52.10	
4	2	Helen Glover; Polly Swann	Great Britain	6:54.96	
5	3	Maria Kyridou; Christina Bourmpou	Greece	6:57.11	
6	6	Aina Cid; Virginia Díaz Rivas	Spain	7:00.05	
