= 2017 World Rowing Championships – Women's coxless pair =

Women's coxless pair at the 2017 World Rowing Championships
- Venue: Nathan Benderson Park
- Location: Sarasota, United States
- Dates: 25–30 September
- Competitors: 22 from 11 nations
- Winning time: 7:00.53

Medalists
gold medal	Grace Prendergast; Kerri Gowler	New Zealand
silver medal	Megan Kalmoe; Tracy Eisser	United States
bronze medal	Hedvig Rasmussen; Christina Johansen	Denmark

The women's coxless pair competition at the 2017 World Rowing Championships in Sarasota took place in Nathan Benderson Park.

== Schedule ==
The schedule was as follows:

Date	Time	Round
Monday 25 September 2017	10:39	Heats
Wednesday 27 September 2017	11:15	Repechages
Saturday 30 September 2017	09:00	Final B
Saturday 30 September 2017	10:23	Final A

All times are Eastern Daylight Time (UTC-4)

== Results ==
=== Heats ===
Heat winners advanced directly to the A final. The remaining boats were sent to the repechages.

==== Heat 1 ====
Rank	Rowers	Country	Time	Notes
1	Grace Prendergast; Kerri Gowler	New Zealand	7:08.32	FA
2	Holly Hill; Melissa Wilson	Great Britain	7:13.91	R
3	Anna Boada; Aina Cid	Spain	7:15.21	R
4	Melanie Hansen; Lea-Kathleen Kühne	Germany	7:29.26	R
5	Milica Slijepčević; Ljiljana Josic	Serbia	7:31.17	R
6	Fernanda Ceballos; Maite Arrillaga	Mexico	7:55.03	R

==== Heat 2 ====
Rank	Rowers	Country	Time	Notes
1	Megan Kalmoe; Tracy Eisser	United States	7:06.26	FA
2	Hedvig Rasmussen; Christina Johansen	Denmark	7:08.97	R
3	Aifric Keogh; Aileen Crowley	Ireland	7:29.53	R
4	Ilaria Broggini; Veronica Calabrese	Italy	7:30.06	R
5	Zhao Mingwei; Miao Tian	China	7:40.37	R

=== Repechages ===
The two fastest boats in each repechage advanced to the A final. The remaining boats were sent to the B final.

==== Repechage 1 ====
Rank	Rowers	Country	Time	Notes
1	Holly Hill; Melissa Wilson	Great Britain	7:25.99	FA
2	Melanie Hansen; Lea-Kathleen Kühne	Germany	7:32.34	FA
3	Zhao Mingwei; Miao Tian	China	7:39.34	FB
4	Aifric Keogh; Aileen Crowley	Ireland	7:41.13	FB
5	Fernanda Ceballos; Maite Arrillaga	Mexico	7:43.65	FB

==== Repechage 2 ====
Rank	Rowers	Country	Time	Notes
1	Hedvig Rasmussen; Christina Johansen	Denmark	7:17.61	FA
2	Anna Boada; Aina Cid	Spain	7:25.76	FA
3	Ilaria Broggini; Veronica Calabrese	Italy	7:39.08	FB
4	Milica Slijepčević; Ljiljana Josic	Serbia	7:40.13	FB

=== Finals ===
The A final determined the rankings for places 1 to 6. Additional rankings were determined in the B final.

==== Final B ====
Rank	Rowers	Country	Time
1	Ilaria Broggini; Veronica Calabrese	Italy	7:17.76
2	Aifric Keogh; Aileen Crowley	Ireland	7:19.89
3	Milica Slijepčević; Ljiljana Josic	Serbia	7:23.75
4	Zhao Mingwei; Miao Tian	China	7:24.44
5	Fernanda Ceballos; Maite Arrillaga	Mexico	7:32.82

==== Final A ====
Rank	Rowers	Country	Time
1st place, gold medalist(s)	Grace Prendergast; Kerri Gowler	New Zealand	7:00.53
2nd place, silver medalist(s)	Megan Kalmoe; Tracy Eisser	United States	7:04.37
3rd place, bronze medalist(s)	Hedvig Rasmussen; Christina Johansen	Denmark	7:06.21
4	Holly Hill; Melissa Wilson	Great Britain	7:13.74
5	Anna Boada; Aina Cid	Spain	7:16.14
6	Melanie Hansen; Lea-Kathleen Kühne	Germany	7:30.95
