= Rowing at the 2016 Summer Olympics – Women's coxless pair =

Women's coxless pair at the Games of the XXXI Olympiad
- Venue: Rodrigo de Freitas Lagoon
- Date: 6–11 August 2016
- Competitors: 30 from 15 nations
- Winning time: 7:18.29

Medalists
1st place, gold medalist(s)		Helen Glover; Heather Stanning	Great Britain
2nd place, silver medalist(s)		Genevieve Behrent; Rebecca Scown	New Zealand
3rd place, bronze medalist(s)		Hedvig Rasmussen; Anne Andersen	Denmark

The women's coxless pair competition at the 2016 Summer Olympics in Rio de Janeiro were held on 6–11 August at the Lagoon Rodrigo de Freitas.

The medals for the competition were presented by Ivo Ferriani, Italy, member of the International Olympic Committee, and the gifts were presented by Mike Williams, Great Britain, Treasurer of the International Rowing Federation.

== Results ==
=== Heats ===
First three of each heat qualify to the semifinals, remainder goes to the repechage.

==== Heat 1 ====
Rank	Rower	Country	Time	Notes
1	Helen Glover; Heather Stanning	Great Britain	7:05.05	SA/B
2	Hedvig Rasmussen; Anne Andersen	Denmark	7:05.28	SA/B
3	Kerstin Hartmann; Kathrin Marchand	Germany	7:17.98	SA/B
4	Jennifer Martins; Nicole Hare	Canada	7:22.99	R
5	Aletta Jorritsma; Karien Robbers	Netherlands	7.23.10	R

==== Heat 2 ====
Rank	Rower	Country	Time	Notes
1	Genevieve Behrent; Rebecca Scown	New Zealand	7:09.23	SA/B
2	Lee-Ann Persse; Kate Christowitz	South Africa	7:11.29	SA/B
3	Zhang Min; Miao Tian	China	7:15.66	SA/B
4	Noémie Kober; Marie Le Nepvou	France	7:26.28	R
5	Alena Furman; Ina Nikulina	Belarus	7.35.23	R

==== Heat 3 ====
Rank	Rower	Country	Time	Notes
1	Felice Mueller; Grace Luczak	United States	7:05.14	SA/B
2	Anna Boada; Aina Cid	Spain	7:12.00	SA/B
3	Anna Wierzbowska; Maria Wierzbowska	Poland	7:12.82	SA/B
4	Alessandra Patelli; Sara Bertolasi	Italy	7:13.06	R
5	Mădălina Bereș; Laura Oprea	Romania	7.18.16	R

=== Repechage ===
First three of heat qualify to the semifinals, remainder goes to Final C.

==== Repechage 1 ====
Rank	Rower	Country	Time	Notes
1	Mădălina Bereș; Laura Oprea	Romania	7:55.25	SA/B
2	Alessandra Patelli; Sara Bertolasi	Italy	7:58.89	SA/B
3	Noémie Kober; Marie Le Nepvou	France	7:59.44	SA/B
4	Jennifer Martins; Nicole Hare	Canada	8:01.09	FC
5	Aletta Jorritsma; Karien Robbers	Netherlands	8:03.07	FC
6	Alena Furman; Ina Nikulina	Belarus	8:07.16	FC

=== Semifinal ===
First three of each heat qualify to the Final A, remainder goes to Final B.

==== Semifinal 1 ====
Rank	Rower	Country	Time	Notes
1	Helen Glover; Heather Stanning	Great Britain	7:18.69	FA
2	Felice Mueller; Grace Luczak	United States	7:20.93	FA
3	Lee-Ann Persse; Kate Christowitz	South Africa	7:24.03	FA
4	Mădălina Bereș; Laura Oprea	Romania	7:29.20	FB
5	Anna Wierzbowska; Maria Wierzbowska	Poland	7:39.12	FB
6	Alessandra Patelli; Sara Bertolasi	Italy	7:45.44	FB

==== Semifinal 2 ====
Rank	Rower	Country	Time	Notes
1	Hedvig Rasmussen; Anne Andersen	Denmark	7:27.56	FA
2	Genevieve Behrent; Rebecca Scown	New Zealand	7:29.67	FA
3	Anna Boada; Aina Cid	Spain	7:30.79	FA
4	Zhang Min; Miao Tian	China	7:30.90	FB
5	Kerstin Hartmann; Kathrin Marchand	Germany	7:39.79	FB
6	Noémie Kober; Marie Le Nepvou	France	7:44.81	FB

=== Finals ===
==== Final C ====
Rank	Rower	Country	Time	Notes
1	Aletta Jorritsma; Karien Robbers	Netherlands	8:23.61	
2	Jennifer Martins; Nicole Hare	Canada	8:26.03	
3	Alena Furman; Ina Nikulina	Belarus	8:32.54	

==== Final B ====
Rank	Rower	Country	Time	Notes
1	Zhang Min; Miao Tian	China	7:17.12	
2	Kerstin Hartmann; Kathrin Marchand	Germany	7:18.57	
3	Mădălina Bereș; Laura Oprea	Romania	7:19.63	
4	Anna Wierzbowska; Maria Wierzbowska	Poland	7:21.53	
5	Alessandra Patelli; Sara Bertolasi	Italy	7:24.51	
6	Noémie Kober; Marie Le Nepvou	France	7:26.55	

==== Final A ====
Rank	Rower	Country	Time	Notes
1st place, gold medalist(s)	Helen Glover; Heather Stanning	Great Britain	7:18.29	
2nd place, silver medalist(s)	Genevieve Behrent; Rebecca Scown	New Zealand	7:19.53	
3rd place, bronze medalist(s)	Hedvig Rasmussen; Anne Andersen	Denmark	7:20.71	
4	Felice Mueller; Grace Luczak	United States	7:24.77	
5	Lee-Ann Persse; Kate Christowitz	South Africa	7:28.50	
6	Anna Boada; Aina Cid	Spain	7:35.22	
