= Rowing at the 2014 Asian Games – Women's coxless pair =

Women's coxless pair at the 2014 Asian Games
- Venue: Tangeum Lake
- Date: 20–24 September 2014
- Competitors: 12 from 6 nations

Medalists
gold medal	Zhang Min; Miao Tian	China
silver medal	Jeon Seo-yeong; Kim Seo-hee	South Korea
bronze medal	Yekaterina Artemyeva; Viktoriya Chepikova	Kazakhstan

The women's coxless pair competition at the 2014 Asian Games in Chungju, South Korea was held from 20 September to 24 September at the Tangeum Lake International Rowing Center.

== Schedule ==
All times are Korea Standard Time (UTC+09:00)

Date	Time	Event
Saturday, 20 September 2014	10:00	Heat
Wednesday, 24 September 2014	10:40	Final

== Results ==
=== Heat ===
- Qualification: 1–6 → Final (FA)

Rank	Team	Time	Notes
1	China (CHN); Zhang Min; Miao Tian	7:28.79	FA
2	South Korea (KOR); Jeon Seo-yeong; Kim Seo-hee	7:41.94	FA
3	Kazakhstan (KAZ); Yekaterina Artemyeva; Viktoriya Chepikova	7:44.98	FA
4	Indonesia (INA); Chelsea Corputty; Wa Ode Fitri Rahmanjani	7:48.59	FA
5	Vietnam (VIE); Trần Thị An; Tạ Thanh Huyền	8:17.91	FA
6	India (IND); Sanjukta Dungdung; Tarunikha Pratap	8:24.48	FA

=== Final ===
Rank	Team	Time
1st place, gold medalist(s)	China (CHN); Zhang Min; Miao Tian	7:30.63
2nd place, silver medalist(s)	South Korea (KOR); Jeon Seo-yeong; Kim Seo-hee	7:45.73
3rd place, bronze medalist(s)	Kazakhstan (KAZ); Yekaterina Artemyeva; Viktoriya Chepikova	7:47.73
4	Indonesia (INA); Chelsea Corputty; Wa Ode Fitri Rahmanjani	7:53.80
5	India (IND); Sanjukta Dungdung; Tarunikha Pratap	8:28.13
6	Vietnam (VIE); Trần Thị An; Tạ Thanh Huyền	8:52.47
