= World Rowing Coastal Championships =

The World Rowing Coastal Championships is an official coastal rowing championship competition organised by World Rowing. The competition was first held in 2006 as the Rowing Coastal World Challenge and took official World Championships status in 2007, being held annually since the beginning (except 2012 and 2020). In these championships, the endurance format is raced, with 4-6km races, in contrast with the World Rowing Beach Sprint Finals in which the head-to-head elimination style is raced, with a short sprint along the beach.

The Heats and B-Finals are raced on 4km courses, whereas the A-Finals are raced on 6km courses.

The starts and finishes can be either on land or at sea, depending on the venue and conditions.

== Venues ==
Year	Location
2006	(United Kingdom) Guernsey
2007	(France) Mandelieu-la-Napoule
2008	(Italy) Sanremo
2009	(United Kingdom) Plymouth
2010	(Turkey) Istanbul
2011	(Italy) Bari
2013	(Sweden) Helsingborg
2014	(Greece) Thessaloniki
2015	(Peru) Lima
2016	Monaco
2017	(France) Thonon-les-Bains
2018	(Canada) Sidney
2019	Hong Kong
2021	(Portugal) Oeiras
2022	(United Kingdom) Saundersfoot
2023	(Italy) Barletta
2024	(Italy) Genoa
2025	(Turkey) Manavgat
2026	

== Medallists ==
=== Men ===
==== Solo ====
Year	Gold	Silver	Bronze
2006	Mr. Rousseau (WAL)	Stewart Briggs (GUE)	Sam Doran (IRL)
2007	Éric Rousseaux (FRA)	Paul Rosenquist (SWE)	Yannick Beaudelot (FRA)
2008	Mathieu Le Nepvou (FRA)	Loïc Biron (FRA)	Yannick Beaudelot (FRA)
2009	Hubert Briand (FRA)	Yannick Beaudelot (FRA)	Peter Berg (SWE)
2010	John Keohane (IRL)	Alberto Etxarte (ESP)	Giuseppe Alberti (ITA)
2011	Giuseppe Alberti (ITA)	Alberto Etxarte (ESP)	Peter Berg (SWE)
2013	Lars Gumprecht (ESP)	Simone Martini (ITA)	Peter Berg (SWE)
2014	Peter Berg (SWE)	Simone Martini (ITA)	Alberto Etxarte (ESP)
2015	Adrián Miramón (ESP)	Eduardo Linares (PER)	Adolfo Ferrer Marin (ESP)
2016	Adrián Miramón (ESP)	Eduardo Linares (PER)	Dennis Gustavsson (SWE)
2017	Simone Martini (ITA)	Eduardo Linares (PER)	Adrián Miramón (ESP)
2018	Eduardo Linares (PER)	Lars Wichert (GER)	Simone Martini (ITA)
2019	Adrián Miramón (ESP)	Lars Wichert (GER)	Simone Martini (ITA)
2021	Jaime Canalejo (ESP)	Eduardo Linares (PER)	Adrián Miramón (ESP)
2022	Adrián Miramón (IRL)	Ramón Gómez (ESP)	Matthew Dunham (NZL)
2023	Adrián Miramón (IRL)	Christopher Bak (USA)	Charles Cousins (GBR)
2024	Finlay Hamill (NZL)	Davide Mumolo (ITA)	Gabriele Loconsole (ITA)
2025	Christopher Bak (USA)	Ander Martín (ESP)	Mathis Nottelet (FRA)
2026	Alexis Fortier (FRA)	Christopher Bak (USA)	Joel Naukkarinen (FIN)

==== Double Sculls ====
Year	Gold	Silver	Bronze
2006	Ozannes (GUE)	Westminster School (ENG)	Stead & Wells (JER)
2007	Romain Crétient (FRA); Xavier Verbeke (FRA)	Ákos Haller (HUN); Zsolt Erdelyi (HUN)	Charles Proto (FRA); Alain Moretto (FRA)
2008	Simon Dubouloz (FRA); Nicolas Moutton (FRA)	Romain Crétient (FRA); Xavier Verbeke (FRA)	Guillaume Bec (FRA); Vincent Pilat (FRA)
2009	Loïc Biron (FRA); Régis Raitif (FRA)	Arthur Marais (FRA); Axel Shirm (FRA)	Nicolas Parquic (FRA); Jérôme Richard (FRA)
2010	Vincent Faucheux (FRA); Mathieu Le Nepvou (FRA)	Adrián Juhász (HUN); Béla Simon (HUN)	Gilles Gachet (FRA); Denis Vogt (FRA)
2011	Davide Mumolo (ITA); Leonardo Boccuni (ITA)	Adolfo Ferrer Marín (ESP); Juan Cáliz Campal (ESP)	Riccardo Burato (ITA); Federico Garibaldi (ITA)
2013	Federico Garibaldi (ITA); Francesco Garibaldi (ITA)	Apóstolos Goudoúlas (GRE); Nikólaos Goudoúlas (GRE)	Andrea Milos (ITA); Stefano Donat (ITA)
2014	Federico Garibaldi (ITA); Francesco Garibaldi (ITA)	Andrea Milos (ITA); Stefano Donat (ITA)	Apóstolos Goudoúlas (GRE); Nikólaos Goudoúlas (GRE)
2015	Giusseppe Alberti (MON); Quentin Antognelli (MON)	Noé Guzmán (ESP); Antonio Guzmán (ESP)	Clément Thomas (FRA); Yannick Beaubelot (FRA)
2016	Noé Guzmán (ESP); Antonio Guzmán (ESP)	Lorenzo Tedesco (ITA); Piero Sfiligoi (ITA)	Giuseppe Alberti (MON); Quentin Antognelli (MON)
2017	Adrián Juhász (HUN); Bendegúz Pétervári-Molnár (HUN)	Mathieu Monfort (MON); Quentin Antognelli (MON)	Michele Ghezzo (ITA); Gustavo Ferrio (ITA)
2018	Julien Bahain (NED); Mitchel Steenman (NED)	Gaël Chocheyras (FRA); Vincent Cavard (FRA)	Antonio Guzmán (ESP); Patricio Rojas (ESP)
2019	Ander Martín (ESP); Carlos González (ESP)	Yurly Ivanov (UKR); Andril Kachanov (UKR)	Giuseppe Alberti (MON); Mathieu Monfort (MON)
2021	Dennis Gustavsson (SWE); Eskil Borgh (SWE)	Luca Chiumento (ITA); Simone Martini (ITA)	Rubén Padilla (ESP); Patricio Rojas (ESP)
2022	Dennis Gustavsson (SWE); Eskil Borgh (SWE)	Giacomo Costa (ITA); Edoardo Marchetti (ITA)	Brook Robertson (NZL); Ben Mason (NZL)
2023	Christopher Bak (USA); Kory Rogers (USA)	Dennis Gustavsson (SWE); Eskil Borgh (SWE)	Alexander Finger (GER); Eduardo Linares (GER)
2024	Ihor Khmara (UKR); Stanislav Kovalov (UKR)	Dennis Gustavsson (SWE); Eskil Borgh (SWE)	Jukka-Pekka Kauppi (FIN); Joel Naukkarinen (FIN)
2026	Kory Rogers (USA); Christopher Bak (USA)	Kealan Mannix (IRL); Ronan Byrne (IRL)	Alexis Fortier (FRA); Aymeric Fortier (FRA)

==== Coxed Quadruple Sculls ====
Year	Gold	Silver	Bronze
2006	Nova Group (GUE)	Thames River Capital (GUE)	Royal Bank of Scotland (GUE)
2007	SN Baie de Saint-Malo (FRA)	Crefelder RC (GER)	SN Bergerac (FRA)
2008	SN Baie de Saint-Malo (FRA)	Ravenna SC (ITA)	Bydgostia (POL)
2009	SN Baie de Saint-Malo (FRA)	Barcelona (ESP)	Marseille (FRA)
2010	NSA Sofia (BUL)	Canottieri Saturnia (ITA)	ST Nazaire Aviron SNOS (FRA)
2011	Fiamme Gialle (ITA)	Canottieri Saturnia (ITA)	Ravenna SC (ITA)
2013	Circolo Canottieri Saturnia (ITA)	Cska Vmf Lokomotiv Byrevestnik (RUS)	Chablais Aviron Thonon (FRA)
2014	Circolo Canottieri Saturnia (ITA)	Budapest Rowing Club (HUN)	Elpis Genova (ITA)
2015	Société Nautique de Monaco (MON)	Circolo Canottieri (ITA)	Club de Regatas Lima (PER)
2016	Dukla Praha (CZE)	Circolo Cannotieri Saturnia I (ITA)	Elpis Genova (ITA)
2017	Circolo Cannotieri Saturnia (ITA)	Ita Uni (ITA)	S.C. Portugal/Fluvial Portuense (POR)
2018	Circolo Cannotieri Saturnia (ITA)	Société Nautique de Monaco (MON)	Société Nautique de la Baie de Saint-Malo (FRA)
2019	Rowing Club Genovese (ITA)	Circolo Cannotieri Saturnia (ITA)	Real Club de Regatas de Alicante (ESP)
2021	SO RC "Dnipro" ZCU (UKR)	Czech Rowing Association (CZE)	UL Tyrian Club (GBR)
2022	UL Tyrian Club (GBR)	Circolo Canottieri Saturnia (ITA)	Gravelines Aviron France (FRA)
2023	Rowing Club Genovese (ITA)	Stuttgarter Rudergesellschaft (GER)	Società Sportiva Murcarolo (ITA)
2024	Central Sports Club of the army of Ukraine (UKR)	Club de Remo Guadalquivir 86 (ESP)	Hollandia Roeiclub (NED)
2026	[[]] (ITA)	[[]] (MON)	[[]] (ITA)

=== Women ===
==== Solo ====
Year	Gold	Silver	Bronze
2006	Perrine Maltret (FRA)	Nina Reid (NZL)	Paula van Katwyk (GUE)
2007	Perrine Maltret (FRA)	Charlotte Culty (FRA)	Alizée Charaux (FRA)
2008	Marie Le Nepvou (FRA)	Charlotte Culty (FRA)	Monika Dukarska (IRL)
2009	Monika Dukarska (IRL)	Margi Jorgensen (GUE)	Denise Tremul (FRA)
2010	Marie Le Nepvou (FRA)	Denise Tremul (ITA)	Ghislaine Le Calvez (FRA)
2011	Charlotte Culty (FRA)	Benedetta Bellio (ITA)	Monika Dukarska (IRL)
2013	Alexandra Tsiavou (GRE)	Stéphanie Chantry (FRA)	Charlotte Culty (FRA)
2014	Jessica Berra (FRA)	Edwige Alfred (FRA)	Stéphanie Chantry (FRA)
2015	Jessica Berra (FRA)	Selene Gigliobianco (ITA)	Stéphanie Chantry (FRA)
2016	Monika Dukarska (IRL)	Alexandra Tsiavou (GRE)	Edwige Alfred (FRA)
2017	Diana Dymchenko (UKR)	Monika Dukarska (IRL)	Edwige Alfred (FRA)
2018	Diana Dymchenko (UKR)	Janneke van der Meulen (NED)	Jessica Berra (FRA)
2019	Diana Dymchenko (UKR)	Jessica Berra (FRA)	Janneke van der Meulen (NED)
2021	Stefania Gobbi (ITA)	Diana Dymchenko (UKR)	Jessica Berra (FRA)
2022	Jessica Berra (FRA)	Diana Dymchenko (AZE)	Maria Berg (SWE)
2023	Monika Dukarska (IRE)	Diana Dymchenko (AZE)	Jessica Berra (FRA)
2024	Monika Dukarska (IRE)	Jessica Berra (FRA)	Eeva Karppinen (FIN)
2025	Emma Twigg (NZL)	Magdalena Lobnig (AUT)	Laura McKenzie (GBR)
2026	Audrianna Boersen (USA)	Bass Andre (GBR)	Eeva Karppinen (FIN)

==== Double Sculls ====
Year	Gold	Silver	Bronze
2006	Aberdyfi Rowing Club (WAL)	Killorglin Rowing Club (IRL)	Exmouth Rowing Club (ENG)
2007	Caroline Guerrand (FRA); Adeline Mendoza (FRA)	Clémence Gourdin (FRA); Charlotte Laurent (FRA)	Maryline Gentin (FRA); Alexandra Pegaz (FRA)
2008	Zsofia Bende (HUN); Lidia Veroci (HUN)	Veronica Pizzamus (ITA); Nicol Grbec (ITA)	Jane Thompson (GBR); Catherine Havard (GBR)
2009	Zsofia Bende (HUN); Lidia Veroci (HUN)	Majda Jerman (ITA); Veronika Pizzamus (ITA)	Maryline Gentin (FRA); Alexandra Pegaz (FRA)
2010	Lenka Wech (GBR); Guin Batten (GBR)	Sabine Da Dalt (FRA); Marion Gully (FRA)	Marie Guingouain (GBR); Sarah Mee (GBR)
2011	Clémence Gourdin (FRA); Edwidge Alfred (FRA)	Yulia Chagina (RUS); Alexandra Fedorova (RUS)	Dominique Goupil-Parez (FRA); Nathalie Rannou (FRA)
2013	Elena Lebedeva (RUS); Yuliya Kalinovskaya (RUS)	Diane Delalleau (FRA); Nathalie Collet (FRA)	Barbara Jonischkeit (GER); Wiebke Gebauer (GER)
2014	Diane Delalleau (FRA); Nathalie Collet (FRA)	Kimberly Forde (ESP); Mª Mar Ferrer (ESP)	Marion Gully (FRA); Sabine Da Dalt (FRA)
2015	Diane Delalleau (FRA); Nathalie Collet (FRA)	Kimberly Forde (ESP); Mª Mar Ferrer (ESP)	Clémentine Lalloz (FRA); Roxane Gabriel (FRA)
2016	Federica Molinaro (ITA); Beatrice Millo (ITA)	Diane Delalleau (FRA); Nathalie Collet (FRA)	Khadija Krimi (TUN); Nour El-Houda Ettaieb (TUN)
2017	Iuliia Volgina (RUS); Olga Khalaleeva (RUS)	Diane Delalleau (FRA); Nathalie Collet (FRA)	María Galván (ESP); Natalia Miguel (ESP)
2018	Eleonora Denich (ITA); Federica Molinaro (ITA)	Maya Cornut-Danjou (FRA); Joséphine Cornut-Danjou (FRA)	Diane Delalleau (FRA); Nathalie Collet (FRA)
2019	Hanna Prakatsen (RUS); Vasilisa Stepanova (RUS)	Maya Cornut-Danjou (FRA); Joséphine Cornut-Danjou (FRA)	Lee Ka Man (HKG); Lee Yuen Yin (HKG)
2021	Anastasiya Kozhenkova (UKR); Kateryna Dudchenko (UKR)	Anna Calina Schanze (DEN); Mette Petersen (DEN)	Daryna Verkhohliad (UKR); Yevheniya Dovhodko (UKR)
2022	Janneke van der Meulen (NED); Karien Robbers (NED)	Monika Dukarska (IRL); Rhiannon O'Donoghue (IRL)	Ainoha Casanova (ESP); Nadia García (ESP)
2023	Janneke van der Meulen (NED); Karien Robbers (NED)	Katharina Lobnig (AUT); Magdalena Lobnig (AUT)	Natalia Miguel (ESP); Celia Miguel (ESP)
2024	Katharina Lobnig (AUT); Magdalena Lobnig (AUT)	Janneke van der Meulen (NED); Karien Robbers (NED)	Linn van Aanholt (NED); Claire de Kok (NED)
2026	Yuanyuan Zhang (CHN); Luping Sun (CHN)	Alessia Palacios (PER); Valeria Palacios (PER)	Charline Labreton (FRA); Marine Delanoe (FRA)

==== Coxed Quadruple Sculls ====
Year	Gold	Silver	Bronze
2006	Killorglin Ladies 4's (IRL)	Moore Stephens (JER)	Geomarine (GUE)
2007	Crefelder RC (GER)	RWT Bydgostia (POL)	Killorglin RC (IRL)
2008	Lausanne Sport Aviron (SUI)	SN Baie de Saint-Malo (FRA)	Danubius Nemzeti Hajós Egylet (HUN)
2009	Thames RC (GBR)	Lausanne Sport Aviron (SUI)	RTW Bydgostia (POL)
2010	Cercle de l’aviron de Nantes (FRA)	Lausanne Sport Aviron (SUI)	RTW Bydgostia (POL)
2011	Chablais Aviron Thonon (FRA)	Upper Thames RC (GBR)	Lausanne Sport Aviron (SUI)
2013	Danish Students Rowing Club (DEN)	Lausanne Sports (SUI)	Marseille RC (FRA)
2014	Aviron Club Cassis (FRA)	Nautical Club Of Thessaloniki (GRE)	Lausanne Sport Aviron (SUI)
2015	Cofradía (ESP)	SN Basse Seine (FRA)	Danske Studenters (DEN)
2016	Club Nautique de Nice (FRA)	GC Kaspiy (RUS)	Real Club de Regatas de Alicante (ESP)
2017	Nautical Club of Thessaloniki (GRE)	Circolo Canottieri Saturnia (ITA)	Erster Kieler RC v. 1862 e. V (GER)
2018	SHVSM VVS (RUS)	Real Club de Regatas de Alicante (ESP)	Société Nautique de Monaco (MON)
2019	Hong Kong Team (HKG)	SHVSM VVS (RUS)	Danske Studenters Roklub (DEN)
2021	ZCU, National Guard (UKR)	Club Nautique Libourne Aviron (FRA)	Real Club Mediterráneo de Málaga (ESP)
2022	Real Club Mediterráneo de Málaga (ESP)	Hawkes Bay Rowing Club (NZL)	Castletownshend Rowing Club (IRL)
2023	Hollandia Roeiclub (NED)	Real Club Mediterráneo de Málaga (ESP)	Composite Irish Rowing Clubs (IRL)
2024	Hollandia Roeiclub (NED)	Stowarzyszenie Olimpijskie WygrywaMy (POL)	Hawkes Bay Rowing Club (NZL)
2026	[[]] (USA)	[[]] (GBR)	[[]] (PER)

=== Mixed ===
==== Double Sculls ====
Year	Gold	Silver	Bronze
2018	Janneke van der Meulen (NED); Mitchel Steenman (NED)	Edwige Alfred (FRA); Pierrick Ledard (FRA)	Kimberly Odette (ESP); Ander Martín (ESP)
2019	Diana Dymchenko (UKR); Yurly Ivanov (UKR)	Janneke van der Meulen (NED); Mitchel Steenman (NED)	Nadia Felipe (ESP); Adrián Miramón (ESP)
2021	Ander Martín (ESP); Esther Briz (ESP)	Jaime Canalejo (ESP); Natalia Miguel (ESP)	Adrián Miramón (ESP); Nadia Felipe (ESP)
2022	Ander Martín (ESP); Esther Briz (ESP)	Adolfo Ferrer (ESP); Teresa Díaz (ESP)	Patrick Boomer (IRL); Monika Dukarska (IRL)
2023	Monika Dukarska (IRL); Ronan Byrne (IRL)	Vincent Noirot (FRA); Edwige Alfred (FRA)	Clare Jamison (GBR); Charles Cousins (GBR)
2024	Patricio Rojas (ESP); Amanda Gil (ESP)	Annalisa Cozzarini (ITA); Andrea Serafino (ITA)	Kristen Froude (NZL); Joseph Sullivan (NZL)
2025	Dominykas Jančionis (LTU); Martyna Kazlauskaitė (LTU)	Christopher Bak (USA); Sera Busse (USA)	Antoine Lefebvre (FRA); Chloé Briard (FRA)
2026	Joel Naukkarinen (FIN); Eeva Karppinen (FIN)	Christopher Bak (USA); Sera Busse (USA)	Zhentao Long (CHN); Yujiao Yang (CHN)

==== Coxed Quadruple Sculls ====
Year	Gold	Silver	Bronze
2025	United States; Kory Rogers; Audrianna Boersen; Annelise Hahl; Malachi Anderson; Coral Kasden	Spain; Pablo Hermoso; María Ángeles Macián; Maialen Mielgo; Miguel Salas; Ainoha Casanova	Australia; Phoebe Robinson; Oscar Scheel-Gamborg; Sophia Wightman; Samuel Forbes; Ryder Taylor
