= Rowing at the 2018 Asian Games – Women's coxless pair =

Women's coxless pair at the 2018 Asian Games
- Venue: Jakabaring Lake
- Date: 19–23 August 2018
- Competitors: 18 from 9 nations

Medalists
gold medal	Ju Rui; Lin Xinyu	China
silver medal	Jeon Seo-yeong; Kim Seo-hee	South Korea
bronze medal	Julianti; Yayah Rokayah	Indonesia

The women's coxless pair competition at the 2018 Asian Games was held on 19–23 August at the JSC Lake.

== Schedule ==
All times are Western Indonesia Time (UTC+07:00)

Date	Time	Event
Sunday, 19 August 2018	10:40	Heats
Tuesday, 21 August 2018	09:50	Repechage
Thursday, 23 August 2018	09:30	Finals

== Results ==
=== Heats ===
- Qualification: 1–2 → Final A (FA), 3–5 → Repechage (R)

==== Heat 1 ====
Rank	Team	Time	Notes
1	South Korea (KOR); Jeon Seo-yeong; Kim Seo-hee	8:23.71	FA
2	Indonesia (INA); Julianti; Yayah Rokayah	8:32.54	FA
3	Myanmar (MYA); Shwe Zin Latt; Nilar Win	8:41.98	R
4	Vietnam (VIE); Lê Thị Hiền; Phạm Thị Huệ	9:00.43	R
5	India (IND); Sanjukta Dungdung; Harpreet Kaur	9:02.88	R

==== Heat 2 ====
Rank	Team	Time	Notes
1	China (CHN); Ju Rui; Lin Xinyu	8:15.40	FA
2	Japan (JPN); Kana Nishihara; Akiho Takano	8:25.11	FA
3	Kazakhstan (KAZ); Svetlana Germanovich; Viktoriya Chepikova	8:41.58	R
4	Thailand (THA); Premruethai Hongseethong; Nuntida Krajangjam	9:10.57	R

=== Repechage ===
- Qualification: 1–2 → Final A (FA), 3–5 → Final B (FB)

Rank	Team	Time	Notes
1	Myanmar (MYA); Shwe Zin Latt; Nilar Win	8:33.80	FA
2	Kazakhstan (KAZ); Svetlana Germanovich; Viktoriya Chepikova	8:39.55	FA
3	India (IND); Sanjukta Dungdung; Harpreet Kaur	8:54.67	FB
4	Vietnam (VIE); Lê Thị Hiền; Phạm Thị Huệ	8:55.01	FB
5	Thailand (THA); Premruethai Hongseethong; Nuntida Krajangjam	9:02.36	FB

=== Finals ===
==== Final B ====
Rank	Team	Time
1	India (IND); Sanjukta Dungdung; Harpreet Kaur	8:30.18
2	Thailand (THA); Premruethai Hongseethong; Nuntida Krajangjam	8:32.08
3	Vietnam (VIE); Lê Thị Hiền; Phạm Thị Huệ	8:50.13

==== Final A ====
Rank	Team	Time
1st place, gold medalist(s)	China (CHN); Ju Rui; Lin Xinyu	7:55.50
2nd place, silver medalist(s)	South Korea (KOR); Jeon Seo-yeong; Kim Seo-hee	8:00.25
3rd place, bronze medalist(s)	Indonesia (INA); Julianti; Yayah Rokayah	8:03.95
4	Japan (JPN); Kana Nishihara; Akiho Takano	8:07.93
5	Myanmar (MYA); Shwe Zin Latt; Nilar Win	8:18.39
6	Kazakhstan (KAZ); Svetlana Germanovich; Viktoriya Chepikova	8:24.78
