= Miao Tian =

Miao Tian may refer to:

- Miao Tien (1925–2005), Chinese film actor
- Miao Tian (rower) (born 1993), Chinese rower
