= Lee-Ann Persse =

South African rower (born 1988)

Lee-Ann Persse (born 20 November 1988, in Nelspruit) is a South African rower, born in Cape Town and currently resides in Pretoria. At the 2012 Summer Olympics, she competed in the Women's coxless pair. Persse and her teammate Naydene Smith were 2nd in the B Final, with the 8th fastest time overall of 7:55.18. At the 2016 Summer Olympics, she competed in the women's coxless pair with teammate Kate Christowitz. They finished in 5th place.

Persse began rowing in 2005.

She and Smith qualified for the 2012 Olympics by finishing 6th at the 2011 World Rowing Championships.
