= Dymchenko =

Dymchenko (Ukrainian: Димченко; Russian: Дымченко) is a Ukrainian surname. Notable people with the surname include:

- Diana Dymchenko (born 1989), Ukrainian rower
- Lyudmila Dymchenko (born 1977), Russian freestyle skier
- Serhiy Dymchenko (born 1967), Ukrainian high jumper
- Anna Dymchenko (born 2003)
