= Lidgett =

Lidgett is a surname. Notable persons with that name include:

- Elizabeth Lidgett (1843–1919), British Poor Law guardian and suffragist
- Jeni Lidgett (born 1964), Australian sailor
- John Scott Lidgett (1854–1953), British Wesleyan Methodist minister and educationist
