= Naydene Smith =

South African rower (born 1987)

Naydene Smith (born 27 August 1987, in Pretoria) is a South African rower. At the 2012 Summer Olympics, she competed in the Women's coxless pair with Lee-Ann Persse. Outside of rowing, she enjoys swimming and sewing.
