= Rowing at the 2012 Summer Olympics – Women's coxless pair =

Women's coxless pair at the Games of the XXX Olympiad
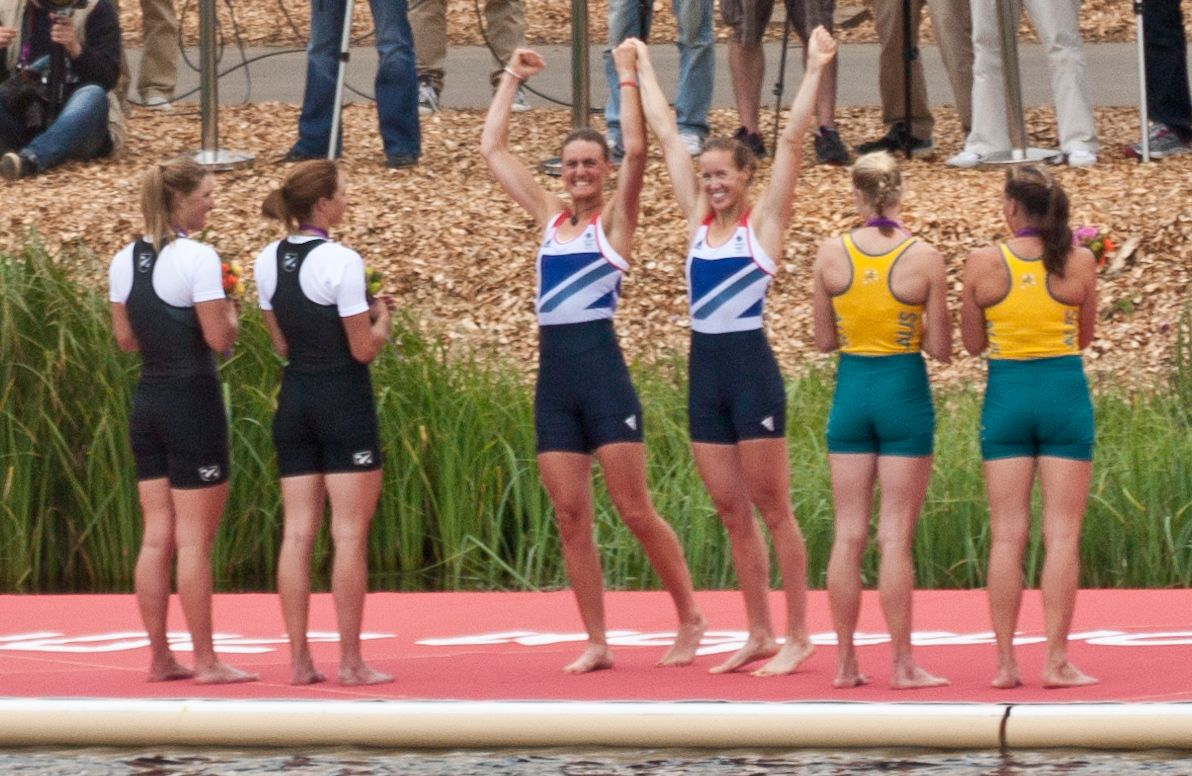
- Winners on the podium (from left): Scown and Haigh (NZL), Stanning and Glover (GBR), Tait and Hornsey (AUS)
- Venue: Eton Dorney
- Date: 28 July – 1 August 2012
- Competitors: 20 from 10 nations
- Winning time: 7:27.13

Medalists
1st place, gold medalist(s)		Helen Glover; Heather Stanning	Great Britain
2nd place, silver medalist(s)		Kate Hornsey; Sarah Tait	Australia
3rd place, bronze medalist(s)		Juliette Haigh; Rebecca Scown	New Zealand

The Women's coxless pair competition at the 2012 Summer Olympics in London took place at Dorney Lake which, for the purposes of the Games venue, is officially termed Eton Dorney.

== Schedule ==
All times are British Summer Time (UTC+1)

Date	Time	Round
Saturday, 28 July 2012	09:30	Heats
Monday, 30 July 2012	09:30	Repechage
Wednesday, 1 August 2012	10:10	Final B
Wednesday, 1 August 2012	11:50	Final

== Results ==
=== Heats ===
First two of each heat qualify to the final, remainder goes to the repechage.

==== Heat 1 ====
Rank	Rowers	Country	Time	Notes
1	Helen Glover; Heather Stanning	Great Britain	6:57.29	Q, OB
2	Sara Hendershot; Sarah Zelenka	United States	6:59.29	Q
3	Georgeta Damian; Viorica Susanu	Romania	7:05.39	R
4	Kerstin Hartmann; Marlene Sinnig	Germany	7:10.28	R
5	Maria Laura Abalo; Gabriela Best	Argentina	7:12.17	R

==== Heat 2 ====
Rank	Rowers	Country	Time	Notes
1	Kate Hornsey; Sarah Tait	Australia	7:01.60	Q
2	Juliette Haigh; Rebecca Scown	New Zealand	7:06.93	Q
3	Zhang Yage; Gao Yulan	China	7:13.38	R
4	Naydene Smith; Lee-Ann Persse	South Africa	7:14.31	R
5	Claudia Wurzel; Sara Bertolasi	Italy	7:21.44	R

=== Repechage ===
First two qualify to the final.

Rank	Rowers	Country	Time	Notes
1	Georgeta Damian; Viorica Susanu	Romania	7:08.42	Q
2	Kerstin Hartmann; Marlene Sinnig	Germany	7:10.42	Q
3	Zhang Yage; Gao Yulan	China	7:15.18	
4	Claudia Wurzel; Sara Bertolasi	Italy	7:18.14	
5	Naydene Smith; Lee-Ann Persse	South Africa	7:18.96	
6	Maria Laura Abalo; Gabriela Best	Argentina	7:20.94	

=== Finals ===
Note: Strong headwinds

==== Final B ====
Rank	Rowers	Country	Time	Notes
1	Zhang Yage; Gao Yulan	China	7:55.18	
2	Naydene Smith; Lee-Ann Persse	South Africa	7:56.40	
3	Maria Laura Abalo; Gabriela Best	Argentina	8:03.53	
4	Claudia Wurzel; Sara Bertolasi	Italy	8:06.14	

==== Final A ====
Rank	Rowers	Country	Time	Notes
1st place, gold medalist(s)	Helen Glover; Heather Stanning	Great Britain	7:27.13	
2nd place, silver medalist(s)	Kate Hornsey; Sarah Tait	Australia	7:29.86	
3rd place, bronze medalist(s)	Juliette Haigh; Rebecca Scown	New Zealand	7:30.19	
4	Sara Hendershot; Sarah Zelenka	United States	7:30.39	
5	Georgeta Damian; Viorica Susanu	Romania	7:37.67	
6	Kerstin Hartmann; Marlene Sinnig	Germany	7:42.06	
