= Marlene Sinnig =

German rower

Personal information
- Born: 11 December 1984 (age 41) Rostock, East Germany

Sport
- Sport: Rowing
Medal record
Women's rowing
Representing Germany
European Championships
Silver medal – second place	2007 Poznań	Eight

Marlene Sinnig (born 11 December 1984 in Rostock) is a German rower. At the 2012 Summer Olympics, she competed in the Women's coxless pair with Kerstin Hartmann.
