= Addy Bucek =

Australian sailor

Personal information
- Full name: Addy Elizabeth Bucek
- Born: 30 December 1960 (age 65) Geelong, Victoria, Australia

Sailing career
- Country: Australia
- Sport: Sailing
- Class: Women's 470

Addy Elizabeth Bucek (born 30 December 1960) is an Australian sailor. She competed in the women's two-person 470 dinghy class for Australia at two Olympic Games.

Bucek began sailing as a child, competing with her brother Frank Bucek as skipper in the cadet dinghy class. In 1974 they won the Cadet World Championships in Tróia, Portugal.

At the Barcelona 1992 Olympics, with Jeni Lidgett as skipper, she finished 9th in the 470 event. At Savannah, Georgia, the 1996 Olympic sailing venue, she and Lidgett finished 8th in the 470 event.

The 470 World Championships in Toronto, Canada in 1995 saw Lidgett and Bucek finish 12th.

== Personal ==
Bucek was born in Geelong, Victoria on 30 December 1960. She married Darren Dunkley-Smith, who administered the 470 class and unfortunately died in 2012. They have three children, Joshua Dunkley-Smith, silver at the 2012 and 2016 Olympic in rowing, rower and psychologist Addy jr. and Connie.
