= Zhang Yage =

Chinese rower

Zhang Yage is a Chinese rower. At the 2012 Summer Olympics, she competed in the Women's coxless pair.
