= Genevieve Behrent =

New Zealand rower (born 1990)

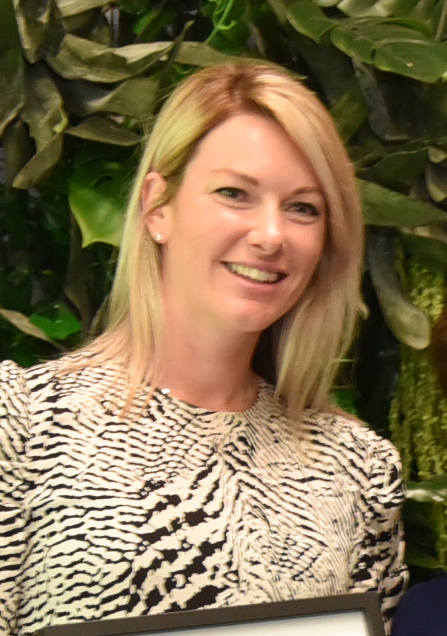
- Behrent (now Macky) in 2020

Personal information
- Born: 25 September 1990 (age 36) Oamaru, New Zealand
- Height: 183 cm (6 ft 0 in)
- Weight: 76 kg (168 lb)

Sport
- Club: Waihopai
Medal record
Women's rowing
Representing New Zealand
Olympic Games
| Silver medal – second place | 2016 Rio de Janeiro | Coxless pair |
World Championships
| Silver medal – second place | 2015 Aiguebelette | Eight |
World U23 Championships
| Silver medal – second place | 2010 Brest | U23 eight |
| Silver medal – second place | 2011 Amsterdam | U23 eight |
| Bronze medal – third place | 2012 Trakai | U23 quad scull |

Genevieve "Gen" Behrent (now Macky; born 25 September 1990) is a New Zealand rower.

== Schooling ==
Behrent was born in Oamaru in 1990. She received her schooling at Southland Girls' High School in Invercargill. Behrent had planned to start her tertiary education at the University of Otago in 2010 when she received her call to the New Zealand rowing squad. She moved to Cambridge to be at the New Zealand training centre at Lake Karapiro and studied at the University of Waikato instead.

== Rowing ==
She never took up rowing while at high school; it was at Lake Ruataniwha in November 2008 when she supported her younger brother at a rowing regatta that she was asked by Southland coach John O'Connor whether she wanted to try rowing herself as she had the right physical attributes. Only 14 months later, she was nominated for the New Zealand under-23 squad to compete at the 2010 World Rowing U23 Championships in Belarus, something that O'Connor termed "astonishing". Her brother, Oliver Behrent, went to the World Rowing Junior Championships in the same year. Her first club was the Waihopai Rowing Club in Southland and she later rowed for the University of Otago. Behrent took 2014 off from competitive rowing for tertiary study. She won a silver medal at the 2015 World Rowing Championships with the women's eight, qualifying the boat for the 2016 Olympics. She also competed in the coxless pair in Rio and with Rebecca Scown won silver, beaten by Heather Stanning and Helen Glover of Great Britain. With the women's eight, she came fourth at the Rio Olympics. In November 2016, she announced that she would take 2017 off from rowing. She has started a career in the banking industry and did not return to rowing for the 2018 season either, but has not announced to Rowing New Zealand that she has retired from rowing.
