= Anne Dsane Andersen =

Danish competitive rower

Personal information
- Nationality: Danish
- Born: 10 November 1992 (age 33) Randers, Denmark
- Height: 183 cm (6 ft 0 in)
- Weight: 86 kg (190 lb)

Sport
- Sport: Rowing
- Team: Roklubben Kvik
Medal record
Women's rowing
Representing Denmark
Olympic Games
Bronze medal – third place	2016 Rio de Janeiro	W2-

Anne Dsane Andersen (born 10 November 1992) is a Danish competitive rower.

She won a bronze medal at the 2016 Summer Olympics in Rio de Janeiro, in the women's coxless pair.
