= Ina Nikulina =

Belarusian rower

Personal information
- Born: 23 February 1995 (age 31)

Sport
- Sport: Rowing

Ina Nikulina (born 23 February 1995) is a Belarusian rower. She competed in the women's coxless pair event at the 2016 Summer Olympics.
