= Rebecca Scown =

New Zealand rower

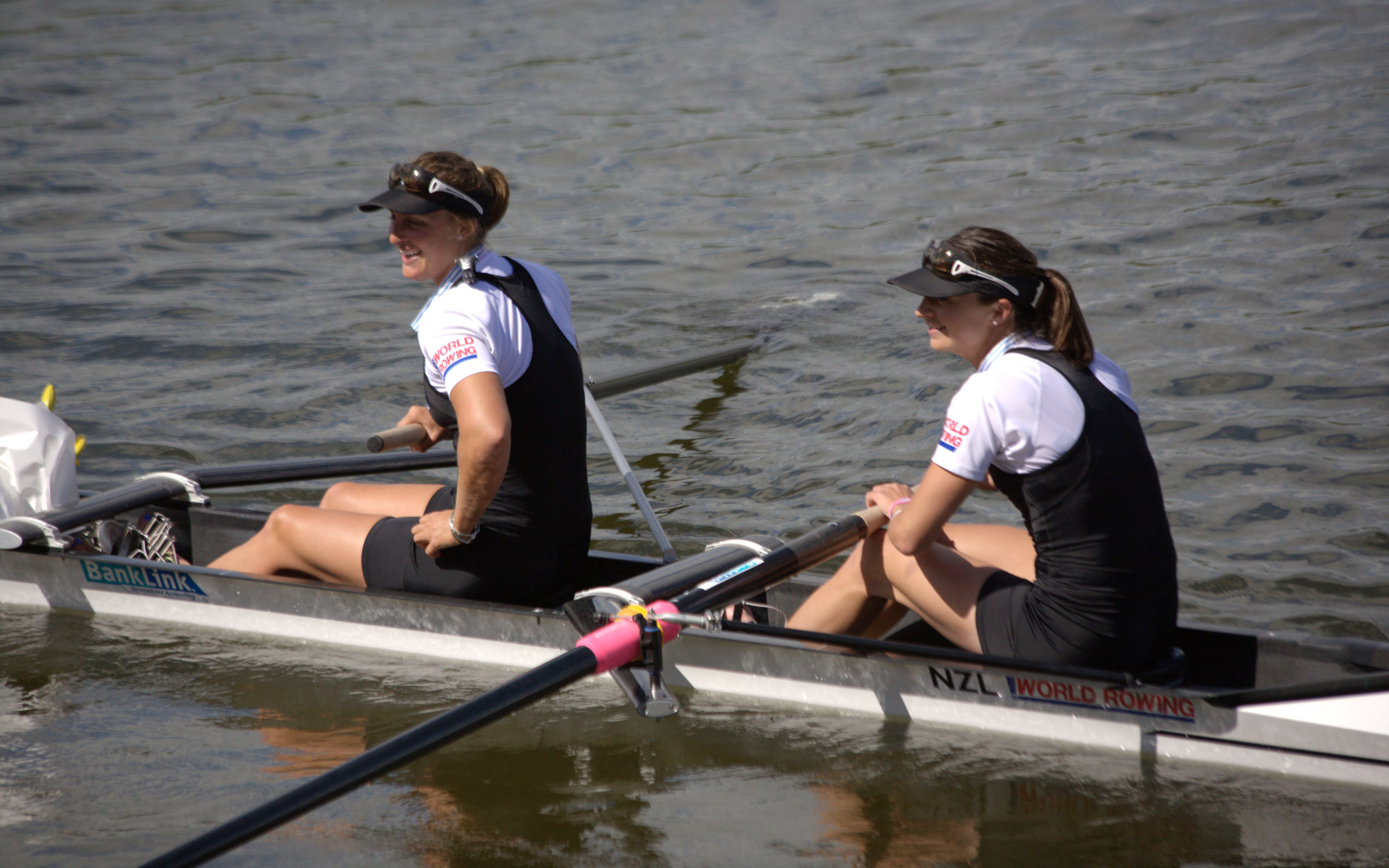
- Juliette Haigh and Rebecca Scown in 2010

Personal information
- Born: 10 August 1983 (age 43) Hāwera, New Zealand
- Height: 1.77 m (5 ft 10 in)
- Weight: 68 kg (150 lb)
- Relatives: Alistair Scown (uncle); Sonia Waddell (cousin)

Sport
- Club: Union Boat Club (Whanganui)
Medal record
Women's rowing
Representing New Zealand
Olympic Games
Silver medal – second place	2016 Rio de Janeiro	Coxless pair
Bronze medal – third place	2012 London	Coxless pair
World Championships
Gold medal – first place	2010 Karapiro	Coxless pair
Gold medal – first place	2011 Bled	Coxless pair
Silver medal – second place	2015 Aiguebelette	Eight
Bronze medal – third place	2009 Poznań	Coxless pair
Bronze medal – third place	2013 Chungju	Coxless pair
Bronze medal – third place	2014 Amsterdam	Coxless pair
Bronze medal – third place	2017 Sarasota	Eight

Rebecca Scown (born 10 August 1983) is a Silver and Bronze Olympic medalist rower from New Zealand. Together with Genevieve Behrent, she won the silver medal in the women's coxless pair at the 2016 Summer Olympics. At the same Olympic games she doubled up to compete in New Zealand's first ever Olympic women's eight placing 4th. Previous to this with Juliette Haigh, she won the bronze medal in the women's coxless pair at the 2012 Summer Olympics. Juliette and Rebecca won gold in the women's pair at the World Rowing Cup regatta in Lucerne, 2010 and at the 2010 World Rowing Championships at Lake Karapiro and the 2011 World Rowing Championships in Bled. Rebecca created history stroking the New Zealand's women's eight at the 2015 World Rowing Championships where they won the first ever silver medal for New Zealand in the event, and in doing so qualified the eight for the Olympic Games in Rio. After winning a bronze medal with the New Zealand women's eight at the 2017 World Rowing Championships, she retired from the sport.

== Personal life ==
Scown was born in Hāwera in 1983. Sonia Waddell (née Scown), a fellow competitive rower, is her cousin. Her uncle Alistair Scown (Waddell's father) is a former All Black. She completed her schooling at Wanganui Collegiate School. She participated in a number of extra-curricular activities during her schooling years, most notably rowing which she took up during her final years at Wanganui Collegiate School. Her teachers saw potential in her and allowed Scown to participate in the New Zealand Secondary Schools Rowing Regatta for Collegiate.

Scown was accepted to the University of Otago to study both Commerce and Arts and completed her Bachelor of Commerce in Marketing and Bachelor of Arts in Art History before moving north to Cambridge in the Waikato to begin her career as a full-time athlete.

Since the completion of her degree, Rebecca has also achieved a postgraduate diploma in Sport Management.

== Rowing career ==
During her summer holidays, Scown would go home to Wanganui and compete in the Rowing New Zealand Summer season. In 2005, which was her final year at University, she received a Rowing New Zealand trial and was named a member of the New Zealand Under-23 Women's quad scull with fellow members Bess Halley, Darnelle Timbs, and Clementine Marshall. Scown and her crew mates competed at the Under-23 World Championships in Amsterdam and won a bronze medal.

In 2006, Scown rowed for the Union Boat Club in Wanganui and the Central Regional Performance Centre, gaining a number of places at the Rowing New Zealand Championships on Lake Karapiro. She was then named as a member of the New Zealand Women's Rowing Eight to compete at the 2006 World Rowing Championships in Eton, England. The crew came in 7th.

A year later, Scown competed at the 2007 World Rowing Championships in Munich, Germany as part of the New Zealand Women's Rowing Eight. However, once again, Scown and her crew returned home empty-handed as they came in 9th.

Scown was later named as the stroke of the New Zealand Women's Eight which was sent to the Rowing at the 2008 Summer Olympics – Qualification in Poznań, Poland, however, her crew was unsuccessful in their bid to qualify for the 2008 Beijing Olympic Games.

2009 provided the opportunity for her to secure a seat in the New Zealand Women's Pair. Scown was named in the boat with fellow eight-rower Emma Feathery and the pair competed at two World Rowing Cup events, winning both world cups and becoming World Rowing Cup leaders for their event in 2009. They went on to compete in the 2009 World Rowing Championships in Poznań, Poland, and found themselves in one of the closest races of the regatta; there was only 1 second within the first three crews in the race and Scown and Feathery came in third, winning the bronze.

In 2010, Juliette Haigh who was in the New Zealand Women's Pair from 2004 to 2008 returned to the event and partnered with Scown in the boat. The pair competed at two World Rowing Cup events and convincingly won both finals and the World Rowing Cup leadership jerseys, making them favourites for the 2010 World Rowing Championships to be held at Lake Karapiro in November 2010. She won a silver medal at the 2015 World Rowing Championships with the women's eight, qualifying the boat for the 2016 Olympics. She also competed in the coxless pair in Rio and with Genevieve Behrent won silver, beaten by the reigning Olympic champions Heather Stanning and Helen Glover of Great Britain. Behrent announced in November 2016 that she would take a break in 2017, hence Scown will need a new rowing partner. Scown rowed with the women's eight in 2017 and won a bronze medal at the 2017 World Rowing Championships in Sarasota, Florida. Scown will take the 2017/18 rowing season off, and will review her involvement in rowing during that time.
