= Claudia Wurzel =

Italian female rower

Personal information
- National team: Italy
- Born: 1 May 1987 (age 39) Marburg, Germany
- Height: 1.80 m (5 ft 11 in)
- Weight: 67 kg (148 lb)

Sport
- Sport: Rowing
- Club: Lario S.C.
- Start activity: 2001
- Coached by: Stefano Fraquelli
Medal record
Event	1st	2nd	3rd
European Championships	0	2	1

Claudia Wurzel (born 1 May 1987) is an Italian rower. At the 2012 Summer Olympics, she competed in the Women's coxless pair with Sara Bertolasi, finishing in 4th place in final B.
