= Elena Oriabinskaia =

Serbian rower

Personal information
- Nationality: Russia; Serbia
- Born: March 15, 1994 (age 32) Salsk, Russia

Sport
- Country: Russia (2015–2025); Serbia (2025–present)
- Sport: Rowing
- Event(s): Four, eight, pair
Medal record
Women's rowing
Representing (Russia) ROC
Olympic Games
Silver medal – second place	2020 Tokyo	Coxless pair
Representing Russia
World Championships
Bronze medal – third place	2017 Sarasota	Coxless four
Bronze medal – third place	2018 Plovdiv	Coxless four
European Championships
Gold medal – first place	2018 Glasgow	Coxless four
Bronze medal – third place	2016 Brandenburg	Coxed eight
Bronze medal – third place	2017 Račice	Coxed eight
Bronze medal – third place	2019 Lucerne	Coxed eight
World U23 Championships
Silver medal – second place	2015 Plovdiv	Coxed eight
Bronze medal – third place	2016 Rotterdam	Coxed eight

Elena Sergeyevna Oriabinskaia (Russian: Елена Сергеевна Орябинская; Serbian: Елена Сергејевна Орјабинскаја / Elena Sergejevna Orjabinskaja; born 15 March 1994) is a Russian-Serbian rower. She and Vasilisa Stepanova won silver in the coxless pair event at the 2020 Summer Olympics held in 2021 in Tokyo.
