= Hedvig Rasmussen =

Danish rower (born 1993)

Personal information
- Nationality: Danish
- Born: 22 December 1993 (age 32) Frederiksberg, Denmark
- Height: 1.87 m (6 ft 2 in)
- Weight: 81 kg (179 lb)

Sport
- Country: Denmark
- Sport: Rowing
- Event(s): Coxless pair, Coxless four
- Club: Danske Studenters Roklub
Medal record
Women's rowing
Representing Denmark
Olympic Games
Bronze medal – third place	2016 Rio de Janeiro	Coxless pair
World Championships
Bronze medal – third place	2017 Sarasota	Coxless pair
Bronze medal – third place	2019 Ottensheim	Coxless four
European Championships
Silver medal – second place	2017 Račice	Coxless pair

Hedvig Lærke Rasmussen (born 22 December 1993) is a Danish competitive rower.

She competed at the 2016 Summer Olympics in Rio de Janeiro, in the women's coxless pair.
