= Nina Hollensen =

Danish rower

Personal information
- Born: 24 April 1992 (age 34)

Sport
- Sport: Rowing

Nina Hollensen (born 24 April 1992) is a Danish rower. She competed in the women's double sculls event at the 2016 Summer Olympics.
