= Kerstin Hartmann =

German rower

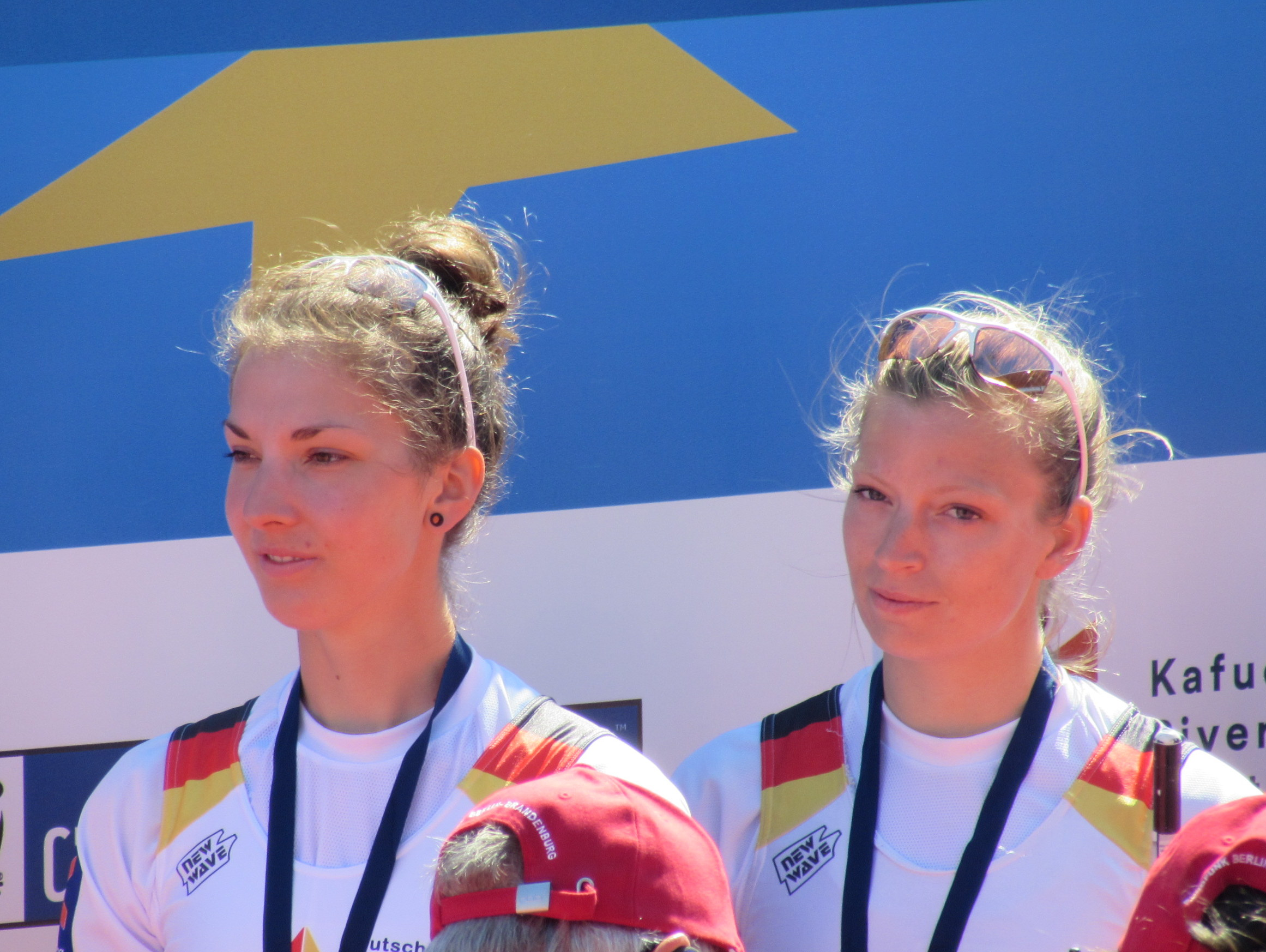
- Kathrin Marchand and Hartmann in 2016

Medal record

Women's rowing

Representing Germany

European Championships
Silver medal – second place	2010 Montemor-o-Velho	W2-
Silver medal – second place	2013 Seville	W2-
Silver medal – second place	2016 Brandenburg	W2-
Bronze medal – third place	2014 Belgrade	W8+

Kerstin Hartmann (born 14 June 1988 in Ulm) is a German rower. At the 2012 Summer Olympics, she competed in the Women's coxless pair with Marlene Sinnig. At the 2016 Summer Olympics in Rio de Janeiro, she competed in the women's coxless pair with teammate Kathrin Marchand. They finished in 8th place.

She won European silver in the women's pairs with Marlene Sinnig in 2010 and 2013 and with Kathrin Marchand in 2016.
