= Kate Christowitz =

South African rower

Personal information
- Nationality: South African
- Born: 5 March 1991 (age 35)
- Height: 184 cm (6 ft 0 in)
- Weight: 76 kg (168 lb)

Sport
- Country: South Africa
- Sport: Rowing
- Now coaching: St Stithians Girls’ College

Kate Christowitz (born 5 March 1991) is a South African competitive rower.

She competed at the 2016 Summer Olympics in Rio de Janeiro, in the women's coxless pair. She and partner Lee-Ann Persse finished in 5th place.

She went to the University of Johannesburg and rowed for the UJ rowing club while there.
