= Jeni Lidgett =

Australian sailor

Personal information
- Full name: Jennifer Norton Lidgett
- Born: 19 November 1964 (age 61) Melbourne, Victoria, Australia
- Spouse: Peter Danks

Sport
- Country: Australia

Sailing career
- Class: Women's 470

Jennifer Norton "Jeni" Lidgett (born 19 November 1964) is an Australian sailor. She competed in the women's two-person 470 dinghy class for Australia at two Olympic Games.

Lidgett learnt to sail at the Davey's Bay Yacht Club where her father was commodore.

At the Barcelona 1992 Olympics, as skipper with Addy Bucek as crew, she finished 9th in the 470 event. At Savannah, Georgia, the 1996 Olympic sailing venue, she and Bucek finished 7th in the 470 event.

The 470 World Championships in Toronto, Canada 1995 saw Lidgett and Bucek finish 12th.

== Personal ==
Lidgett was born in Melbourne on 17 November 1964, daughter of Athol and Julie Lidgett. She is married to Peter Danks and has three sons, Sam, Ted and David.
