= Trine Dahl Pedersen =

Danish rower

Personal information
- Nationality: Danish
- Born: 22 July 1996 (age 28)

Sport
- Country: Denmark
- Sport: Rowing
- Event: Coxless four

Trine Dahl Pedersen is a Danish rower. She represented Denmark at the 2020 Summer Olympics in Tokyo.
