= Monika Dukarska =

Polish-born Irish rower

Personal information
- Citizenship: Poland; Ireland
- Born: 18 October 1990 (age 36) Poznań, Poland
- Home town: Killorglin, County Kerry, Ireland
- Height: 182 cm (6 ft 0 in)

Sport
- Country: Ireland
- Sport: Rowing & Coastal Rowing
Medal record
Women's Coastal Rowing
Representing Ireland
World Rowing Coastal Championships
Gold medal – first place	2009 Plymouth
Gold medal – first place	2016 Monaco
Gold medal – first place	2023 Barletta
Gold medal – first place	2023 Barletta
Gold medal – first place	2024 Genoa
Silver medal – second place	2017 Thonon-les-Bains
Silver medal – second place	2022 Saundersfoot
Bronze medal – third place	2008 Sanremo
Bronze medal – third place	2011 Bari
Bronze medal – third place	2022 Saundersfoot

Monika Dukarska (born 18 October 1990) is a Polish-born Irish rower. She competed for Ireland alongside Aileen Crowley in the women's coxless pair event at the 2020 Summer Olympics they finished 11th overall.

Dukarska grew up in Poznań, and moved with her family to Ireland when she was sixteen, settling in Killorglin, County Kerry.

She holds two master's degrees and was completing a PhD in education at MTU Kerry at the time of the Games.

== Personal life ==
Dukarska was born in Poznań, Poland, Dukarska grew up cycling around the famous rowing lake in her home city but never took up the sport there. Her family moved to Killorglin, when she was 16 and she began rowing in 2008 she was offered the opportunity to row for Poland but choosing Ireland as the country that had invested in her.
