= Zhang Min (rower) =

Chinese rower

Personal information
- Born: 20 June 1993 (age 33) Jinan, Shandong, China

Sport
- Sport: Rowing
Medal record
Women's rowing
Representing China
Olympic Games
Bronze medal – third place	2020 Tokyo	Eight

Zhang Min (Chinese: 张敏; pinyin: Zhāng Mǐn; born 20 June 1993) is a Chinese rower. She competed in the women's coxless pair event at the 2016 Summer Olympics, and placed 7th. She also competed in the women's eight rowing event, where they received a bronze medal.
