= Liu Jinchao =

Chinese rower

Personal information
- Nationality: China
- Born: 22 November 1994 (age 31) Weifang, China

Sport
- Sport: Rowing

Liu Jinchao (born 22 November 1994) is a Chinese rower. She competed in the 2020 Summer Olympics.
