= Sara Bertolasi =

Italian rower

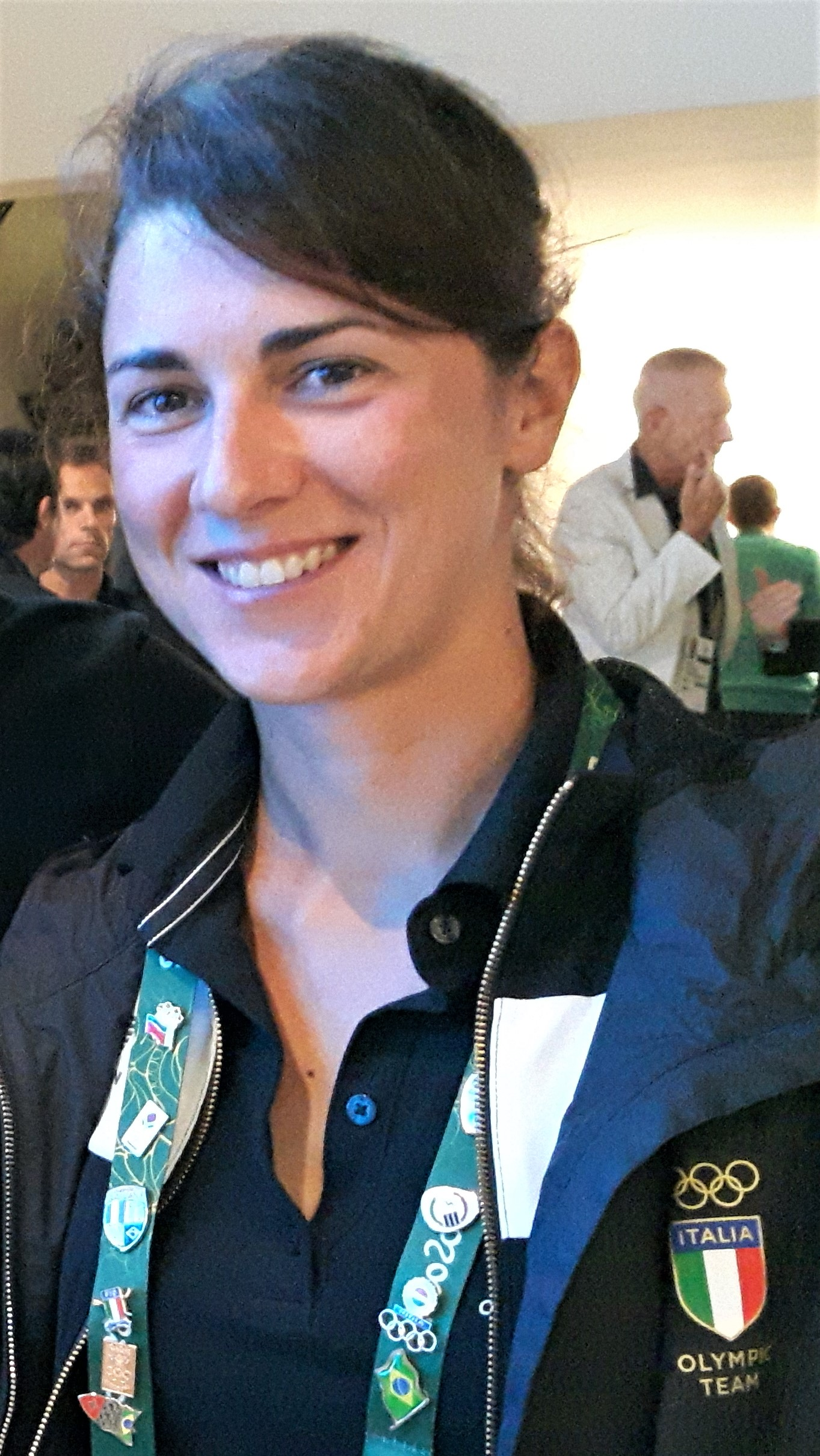

Sara Bertolasi (29 April 1988, Busto Arsizo) is an Italian rower. At the 2012 Summer Olympics, she competed in the Women's coxless pair with Claudia Wurzel. At the 2016 Olympic Games, she competed in the same event with Alessandra Patelli. She was part of the Italian women's eight who won the silver medal at the 2012 European Rowing Championships on home water in Varese. She and Wurzel won bronze at the 2011 European Rowing Championships.
