= Anna Boada =

Spanish rower

Personal information
- Nationality: Spanish
- Born: Anna Boada Peiró; 30 December 1992 (age 33)

Sport
- Sport: Rowing
Medal record
Women's rowing
Representing Spain
World Championships
Bronze medal – third place	2018 Plovdiv	Coxless pair

Anna Boada Peiró (born 30 December 1992) is a Spanish competitive rower.

She competed at the 2016 Summer Olympics in Rio de Janeiro, in the women's coxless pair.
