= Juliette Haigh =

New Zealand rower

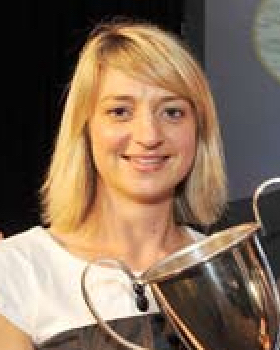
- Haigh in 2008

Personal information
- Born: 4 August 1982 (age 44) Auckland, New Zealand
- Spouse: Mahé Drysdale
Medal record
Women's rowing
Representing New Zealand
Olympic Games
Bronze medal – third place	2012 London	Coxless pair
World Championships
Gold medal – first place	2005 Gifu	Coxless pair
Gold medal – first place	2010 Karapiro	Coxless pair
Gold medal – first place	2011 Lake Bled	Coxless pair
Silver medal – second place	2006 Eton	Coxless pair
World Rowing Cup
Gold medal – first place	2005 Lucerne	Coxless pair
Gold medal – first place	2005 Munich	Coxless pair
Gold medal – first place	2007 Lucerne	Coxless pair
Gold medal – first place	2010 Lucerne	Coxless pair
Gold medal – first place	2010 Munich	Coxless pair
Silver medal – second place	2007 Amsterdam	Coxless pair
Silver medal – second place	2008 Poznan	Coxless pair

Juliette Anne Haigh (born 4 August 1982), also known by her married name Juliette Drysdale but better known by her maiden name, is a retired professional rower.

Haigh was born in 1982 in Auckland, New Zealand. Her parents are Penny and John Haigh. She knew that she wanted to compete at Olympic Games as a child but had not chosen a sport yet. She started rowing while she attended Takapuna Grammar School. Haigh has studied public relations at the University of Auckland, the University of Waikato, and Massey University.

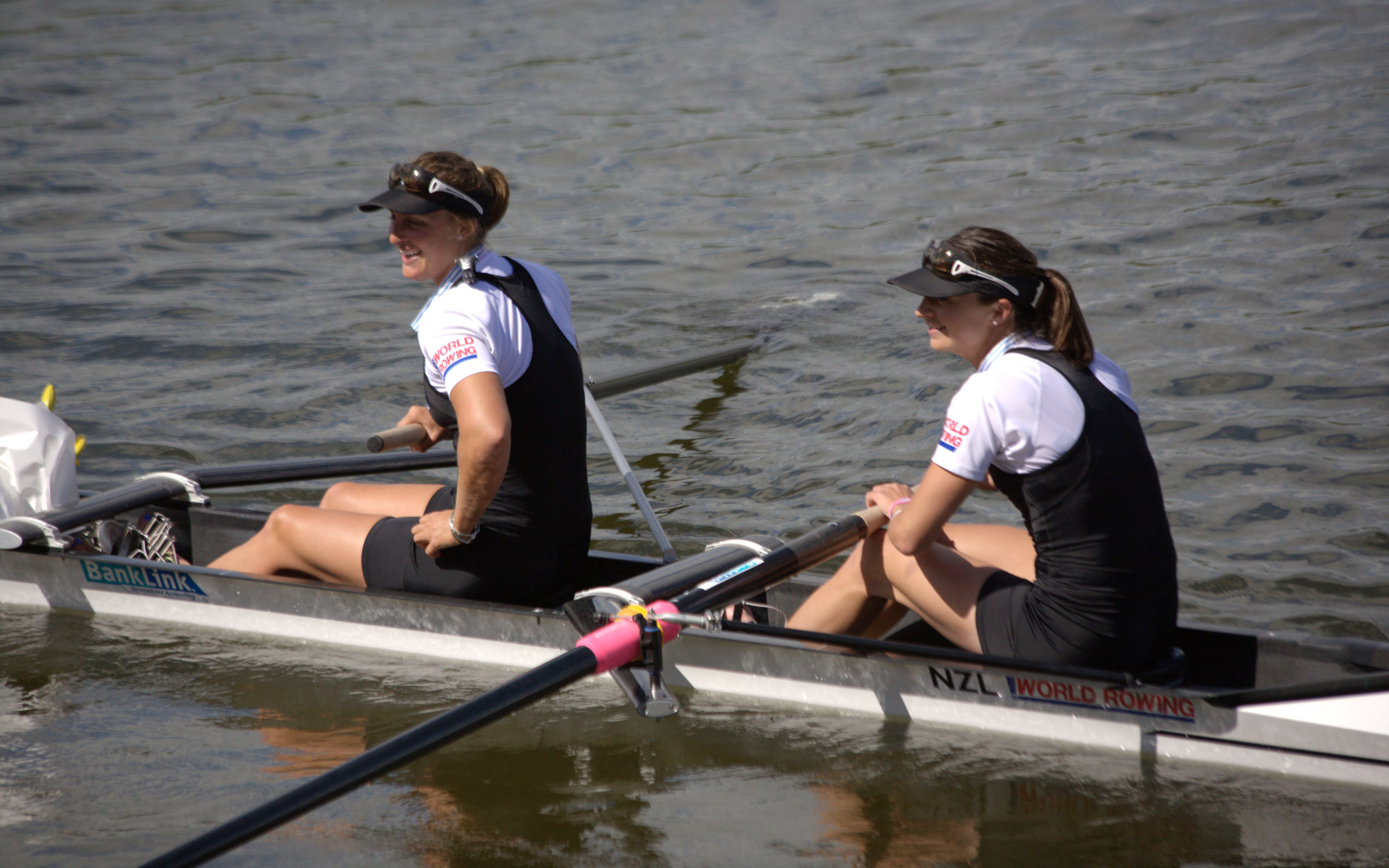
Haigh and Rebecca Scown, after winning gold in the women's coxless pair at the 2010 World Rowing Championships at Lake Karapiro

Haigh was in the New Zealand Women's Pair from 2004 to 2008 with Nicky Coles, then returned to the event after a year out and partnered Rebecca Scown in the boat. She won a gold medal in the women's pair at the World Rowing Cup regatta in Lucerne, 2010 and followed this by winning the 2010 World Rowing Championships in Lake Karapiro. Haigh and Scown won the bronze medal at the 2012 Summer Olympics in the same event. Haigh announced her retirement from competitive rowing on 2 December 2012.

After having been together for six years, Haigh got engaged to fellow New Zealand rower Mahé Drysdale in 2013. They first met in 2001 when they were both members of Auckland's West End Rowing Club. They became close friends and later flatted together. They married later in 2013 and spent their honeymoon on Mahé in the Seychelles; her husband is named for the island but had never been there before. The Drysdales had a girl in October 2014, they also have a son and another daughter. They live on a farm in Cambridge.

Since retiring from rowing, Drysdale serves as a trustee on the New Zealand Rowing Foundation Board, is a writer for Newsroom's LockerRoom and is an accomplished photographer.
