= Vasilisa Stepanova =

Russian rower

Personal information
- Nationality: (Russia) Russian
- Born: January 26, 1993 (age 33) Tver, Russia

Sport
- Country: Russia
- Sport: Rowing
- Event(s): Pair, four
Medal record
Women's rowing
Representing (Russia) ROC
Olympic Games
Silver medal – second place	2020 Tokyo	Coxless pair
Representing Russia
European Championships
Bronze medal – third place	2019 Lucerne	Coxed eight
World U23 Championships
Gold medal – first place	2014 Varese	Coxless four

Vasilisa Andreyevna Stepanova (Russian: Василиса Андреевна Степанова, IPA: [vəsʲɪˈlʲisə sʲtʲɪˈpanəvə]; née Kostygova, Russian: Костыгова; born 26 January 1993) is a Russian rower. She and Elena Oriabinskaia won silver in the coxless pair event at the 2020 Summer Olympics held in 2021 in Tokyo.

== Early life ==
Stepanova was born in Tver on 26 January 1993. Her father Andrey Kostygov is a rowing coach for CSKA Moscow and her brother Pavel is an ice hockey player. In her childhood she performed swimming and canoeing and kayaking. When their parents moved to Zelenograd, Stepanova participated on swimming competitions, even winning in the 100 and 500 butterfly and freestyle events. In summertime Stepanova moved for canoeing to Tver, where she was coached by Honoured Coach Aleksandr Sergeyev.

When she was 15 years old, her and her father once rowed together, with Stepanova rowing on a canoe and her father on a single sculls. After trying out her father's rowing boat, she enjoyed it as much as to win in the single sculls event on a junior tournament held in Moscow two or three weeks later. One year later she joined the Russian junior team, winning multiple national and international tournaments.

On 26 July, Stepanova won the quadruple sculls event of the 2014 World Rowing U23 Championships. She won the double sculls event at the 2019 Coastal Rowing Championships in Hong Kong with Hanna Prakatsen.

== Personal life ==
In 2014 Stepanova married Rostov-on-Don-based rower Vasily Stepanov, switching to his name. She resides in Moscow.
