= Diana Dymchenko =

Ukrainian-Azerbaijani rower

Personal information
- Born: 8 September 1989 (age 36) Oleshky, Ukraine

Sport
- Country: Azerbaijan (currently); Ukraine (formerly)
- Sport: Rowing
Medal record
Women's rowing
Representing Ukraine
European Rowing Championships
Bronze medal – third place	2018 Glasgow	W1x

Diana Dymchenko (Ukrainian: Діана Димченко; Azerbaijani: Diana Dimçenko; born 8 September 1989 in Oleshky, Kherson Oblast) is a Ukrainian-born Azerbaijani rower.

== Biography ==
Dymchenko won the bronze medal at the 2018 European Championships in Glasgow, Scotland.

Dymchenko was part of the national team of Ukraine first, and later became part of the Azerbaijan national team. She represented Azerbaijan and has finished 2nd in A-Finals of the 2022 World Rowing Coastal Championships held in Saundersfoot, Pembrokeshire, Wales and won the silver medal. Diana represented Azerbaijan in the 2022 European Rowing Coastal and Beach Sprint Championships held in San Sebastián, Spain and won the gold medal in the women`s single sculls after recording a time of 22:56.72.

In 2023, Dymchenko won the Princess Royal Challenge Cup (the premier women's singles sculls event) at the Henley Royal Regatta, rowing for the Rowing Club Baku.
