= Addy Dunkley-Smith =

Australian rower

Personal information
- Born: 30 August 1993 (age 33)
- Education: Geelong College; Deakin University
- Occupation: Clinical Psychologist
- Years active: 2012-2018

Sport
- Sport: Rowing
- Club: Mercantile Rowing Club

Achievements and titles
- National finals: Queen's Cup (W8+) 2015-18
Medal record
Women's rowing
Representing Australia
U23 World Championships
Bronze medal – third place	2015 Plovdiv	Coxless pair

Addy Dunkley-Smith (born 30 August 1993 in Victoria) is an Australian former national representative rower and a Clinical Psychologist in practice. As a rower she was a four-time Australian national champion and a 2015 medallist at U23 World Rowing Championships.

== Personal ==
Dunkley-Smith first learned to row at the Barwon Rowing Club and then at The Geelong College. She rowed in The Geelong College's first VIII in Victorian Schools Head of the River races in 2010 and 2011.

Her mother, Addy Bucek, is a former Australian Olympic sailing representative. Her older brother Joshua is a former national representative rower who won medals at five World Rowing Championships and at two Olympic Games.

== Club and state rowing ==
Dunkley-Smith's senior club rowing has been from the Mercantile Rowing Club.

She was first selected to represent Victoria in the women's youth eight which contested the Bicentennial Cup in the Interstate Regatta at the 2012 Australian Rowing Championships. In 2013 she stroked the Victorian youth eight to a silver medal finish. In 2015 she rowed in the Victorian senior women's eight which contested and won the Queen's Cup at the Australian Interstate Regatta. She rowed in further Queen's Cup winning Victorian women's eights in 2016, 2017, and 2018.

== International representative rowing ==
Dunkley-Smith made her Australian representative debut in 2013 in the Trans-Tasman Series of match races against New Zealand crews on Lake Karopiro, New Zealand. In 2014 she made it into the U23 Australian eight which at the U23 World Championships in Varese that year placed fourth. In 2015 she rowed with Katrina Werry in the coxless pair to a bronze medal win at the World Rowing U23 Championships in Plovdiv.

Dunkley-Smith made the Australian senior squad and into the three seat of the senior women's eight when they started their 2018 international campaign with a bronze medal win at the World Rowing Cup II in Linz, Austria. Then at the WRC III in Lucerne they finished fifth. For the 2018 World Rowing Championships in Plovdiv Dinkley-Smith lost her seat in the eight to Rosie Popa and she raced in Australia's coxless pair with Hannah Vermeersch. They placed eighth overall at that regatta which was Dunkley-Smith's last Australian representative appearance.

== Professional career ==
Dunkley-Smith has Bachelors and Honours degrees in Psychology and Psychophysiology. In 2022 she obtained her Doctorate in Clinical Psychology from Deakin University. As of 2023 she practices in Ontario, Canada with expertise in the area of youth and families living with mentally ill parents. Her scholarly works have been published in peer-reviewed journals.
