= Alessandra Patelli =

Italian rower

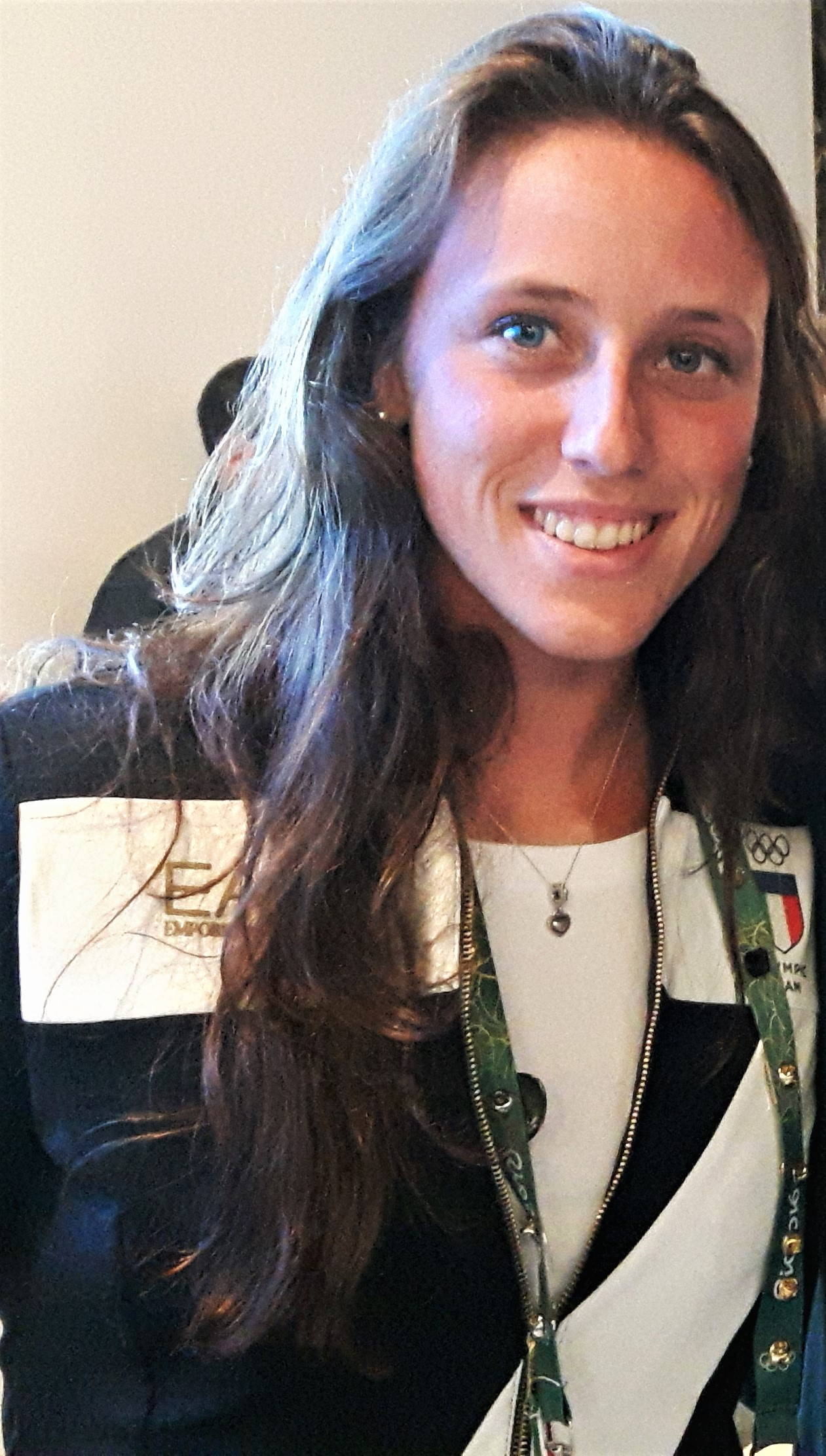

Personal information
- Born: 17 November 1991 (age 34)

Sport
- Sport: Rowing

Alessandra Patelli (born 17 November 1991) is an Italian rower. She competed in the women's coxless pair event at the 2016 Summer Olympics. She competed in Double sculls, at the 2020 Summer Olympics.
