= Tracy Eisser =

American rower (born 1989)

Personal information
- Born: November 20, 1989 (age 36) Summit, New Jersey, U.S.
- Height: 6 ft 1 in (185 cm)
- Weight: 185 lb (84 kg)
Medal record
Women's rowing
Representing the United States
World Championships
Gold medal – first place	2015 Aiguebelette	Quadruple sculls
Silver medal – second place	2017 Sarasota	Coxless pair
Bronze medal – third place	2014 Amsterdam	Quadruple sculls

Tracy Eisser (born November 20, 1989) is an American rower who was selected to compete as part of the United States team at the 2016 Summer Olympics. She won the gold medal in the quad sculls at the 2015 World Rowing Championships.

Eisser grew up in Fair Lawn, New Jersey and attended Fair Lawn High School, where she competed in the high jump and long jump. She graduated from Cornell University in 2012.
