= Grace Luczak =

American rower (born 1989)

Grace Luczak (Fattal)
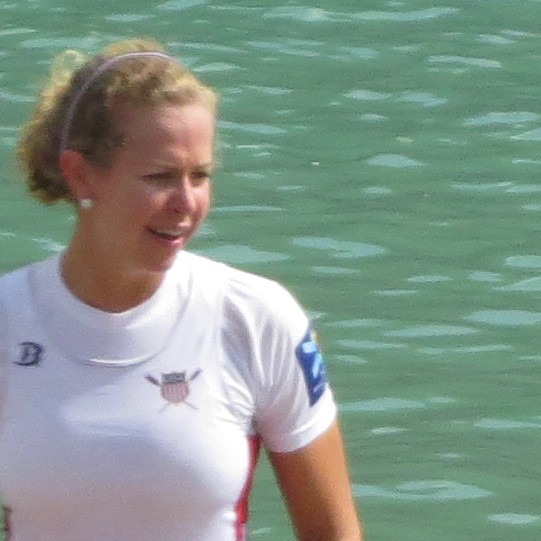
- Luczak in 2015 at Aiguebelette

Personal information
- Born: May 24, 1989 (age 37) Royal Oak, Michigan, U.S.
- Height: 6 ft 3 in (191 cm)
- Weight: 170 lb (77 kg)
Medal record
Women's rowing
Representing the United States
World Championships
| Gold medal – first place | 2013 Chungju | W8+ |
| Gold medal – first place | 2014 Amsterdam | W8+ |
| Gold medal – first place | 2015 Aiguebelette | W4- |
| Bronze medal – third place | 2010 Karapiro | W4- |

Grace Luczak (Fattal) (born May 24, 1989 in Royal Oak, Michigan) is an American Olympic rower.

== Life ==
Luczak was a member of the USA Olympic rowing team in 2016 and 2020. She has set two World Records, including the current record in the Women’s 8+ boat. She is a three-time World Champion and multiple World Cup medalist. She was recognized as one of the Top 10 Rowers in the world by World Rowing.

She began rowing at Pioneer High School in Michigan. From there, she attended Stanford University, competing from 2008 through 2011. The women's rowing team won the NCAA Championship in 2009, with Luczak in the winning Varsity 8+. In 2023, she was inducted into the Stanford Athletics Hall of Fame.

In 2015 Luczak, Kristine O'Brien, Adrienne Martelli and Grace Latz took the gold medal in the coxless four at the 2015 World Rowing Championships.

In the 2016 Summer Olympics, Luczak and Felice Mueller, rowing in the Women's Coxless Pairs, finished fourth. In the 2020 Summer Olympics, Luczak and three other rowers finished 7th in the Women's Coxless Four event.

Luczak married Michael Fattal in 2022.
