= Aileen Crowley =

Irish rower

Personal information
- Nationality: Irish
- Born: Killorglin, County Kerry, Ireland

Sport
- Country: Ireland
- Sport: Rowing

Aileen Crowley (born 12 February 1994) is an Irish rower. She competed for Ireland alongside Monika Dukarska in the women's coxless pair event at the 2020 Summer Olympics.
