= Anna Wierzbowska =

Polish rower (born 1990)

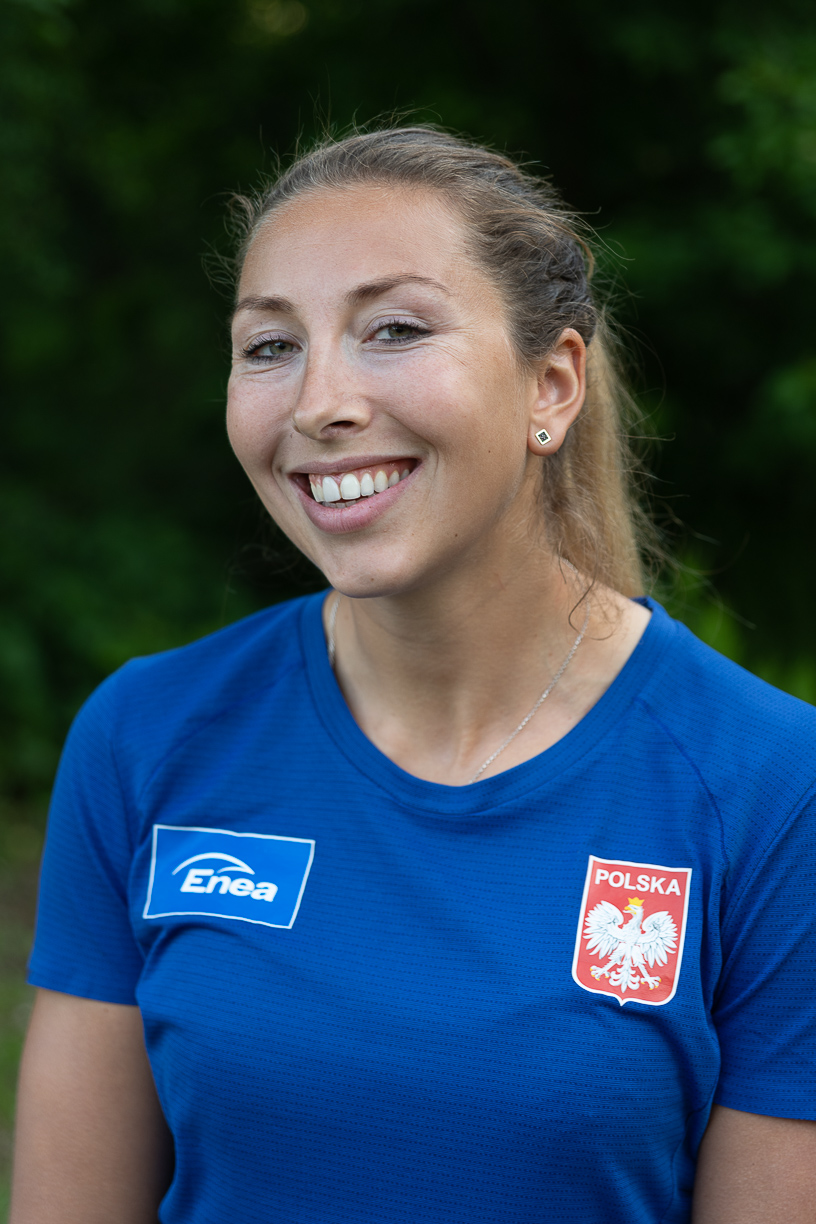

Personal information
- Nationality: Polish
- Born: 8 December 1990 (age 35) Kraków, Poland
- Height: 184 cm (6 ft 0 in)
- Weight: 77 kg (170 lb)

Sport
- Country: Poland
- Sport: Rowing
Medal record
Women's rowing
Representing Poland
European Championships
Silver medal – second place	2017 Račice	W4-

Anna Wierzbowska (born 8 December 1990) is a Polish rower. She competed in the women's coxless pair event at the 2016 Summer Olympics.
