= Lin Xinyu =

Chinese rower

Personal information
- Nationality: Chinese
- Born: 21 October 1994 (age 30); Wuhan, China

Sport
- Sport: Rowing

Lin Xinyu (born 21 October 1994) is a Chinese rower. She competed in the women's coxless four event at the 2020 Summer Olympics.
