= Megan Kalmoe =

American rower

Megan Kalmoe OLY
Personal information
- Full name: Megan Elizabeth Kalmoe
- Born: August 21, 1983 (age 43) Minneapolis, Minnesota, U.S.
- Website: MeganKalmoe.com
Medal record
Women's rowing
Representing the United States
Olympic Games
Bronze medal – third place	2012 London	Quadruple sculls
World Championships
Gold medal – first place	2015 Aiguebelette	Quadruple sculls
Silver medal – second place	2011 Lake Bled	Quadruple sculls
Silver medal – second place	2014 Amsterdam	Coxless pair
Silver medal – second place	2017 Sarasota	Coxless pair

Megan Elizabeth Kalmoe (born August 21, 1983) is an American female oarswoman who reached the final of the double sculls competition of the 2008 Summer Olympics in Beijing, with teammate Ellen Tomek. The duo finished fifth overall, with a time of 7:17.53 over 2000 m. The double trained at the U.S. Rowing Training Center at Princeton, New Jersey.

She won the bronze medal at the 2012 Summer Olympics in the quadruple sculls event.

== Personal life ==
Kalmoe graduated from the University of Washington in 2006 with a degree in Latin and English in 2006 as U of W Huskies Team Captain and 101 Club Scholar Athlete. At her Saint Croix Falls, Wisconsin high school, she was team captain of both the cross country and basketball teams, a member of the National Honor Society, senior class vice president, and student body president. She graduated fourth in her class, and was a section leader and drum major in band. She received the Arion Award for most outstanding musicianship and the Marketplace, Greg Fey Memorial and Dayton's "Project Imagine" scholarships.

Her future ambitions include visiting the world's largest and most celebrated parties, including Carnival, Mardi Gras, New Year's Eve on Times Square, Oktoberfest, and the Super Bowl. The 5'10" athlete would also like to travel to all of the U.S. National Parks, hike the Appalachian Trail, coach college rowing, and write an Academy Award-winning screenplay before earning an English PhD, writing a novel, and moving to South Africa.

Since 2008 Kalmoe and friends have annually compiled The List, a ranking of the "20 Hottest Male Rowing Athletes of the Year", which generates great debate among international rowers.
