= Miao Tian (rower) =

Chinese rower

Personal information
- Born: 18 January 1993 (age 33)

Sport
- Sport: Rowing
Medal record
Women's rowing
Representing China
Olympic Games
Bronze medal – third place	2020 Tokyo	Eight

Miao Tian (Chinese: 苗甜; pinyin: Miáo Tián; born 18 January 1993) is a Chinese rower. She competed in the women's coxless pair event at the 2016 Summer Olympics.
