= Marie Le Nepvou =

French rower (born 1985)

Personal information
- Born: 25 January 1985 (age 41) Saint-Brieuc, France
- Height: 1.81 m (5 ft 11 in)
- Weight: 72 kg (159 lb)

Sport
- Sport: Rowing
Medal record
Representing France
World Championships
| Gold medal – first place | 2004 Catalonia | W4- |

Marie Le Nepvou (born 25 January 1985) is a French rower. She competed in the women's coxless pair event at the 2016 Summer Olympics. She also won a gold medal at the 2004 World Rowing Championships on the Lake of Banyoles in Catalonia, Spain, in the women's four event.
