= Remenham Challenge Cup =

Event at the Henley Royal Regatta

- Venue: Henley Royal Regatta, River Thames
- Location: Henley-on-Thames, Oxfordshire
- Dates: 1998–present

The Remenham Challenge Cup is a rowing event for women's eights at the annual Henley Royal Regatta on the River Thames at Henley-on-Thames in England. It is open to female crews from all eligible rowing clubs. Two or more clubs may combine to make an entry.

== History ==
In 1998, the first invitation event was held for women's eight, which in 1999 became an open event known as the Henley Prize. In 2002, the Remenham Club presented a trophy in memory of its late president, Ian Rogers M.B.E., and the event was subsequently renamed The Remenham Challenge.

== Past winners ==
=== As Invitation Eights ===
Year	Winner	Runner-up	Winning crew	Time	Ref
1998	San Diego Training Center, USA	Great Britain national team		7:05	
1999	Marlow RC & Thames RC	Thames & Marlow		7:05	

=== As Henley Prize ===
Year	Winner	Runner-up	Winning crew	Time	Ref
2000	University of Washington, USA	University of Victoria, CAN		7:29	
2001	Australian Institute of Sport, AUS	Nautilus	Jodi Winter, Jo Lutz, Julia Wilson, Jane Robinson, Emily Martin, Rebecca Sattin, Victoria Roberts, Kristina Larsen (s) Carly Bilson (c)	6:36	

=== As Remenham Challenge Cup ===
Year	Winner	Runner-up	Winning crew	Time	Ref
2002	Oxford Brookes University	Tideway Scullers School		7:44	
2003	Western RC & Victoria City RC, CAN	N.S.W. & Australian Institute of Sports		6:56	
2004	Thames Rowing Club and University of London	Princeton University, USA		7:10	
2005	Thames Rowing Club	Leander Club & Durham University		7:27	
2006	Princeton Training Center, USA	Hollandia Roeiclub, NED		6:50	
2007	Dortmund RC, Germany	Leander Club & Thames Rowing Club		7:22	
2008	Leander Club & Wallingford Rowing Club	Leander Club & Furnivall Sculling Club	incl: Heather Stanning	7:31	
2009	Leander Club & Wallingford Rowing Club	Yale University, USA	incl: Jessica Eddie	7:37	
2010	Western Rowing Club, Canada	Leander Club & Oxford Brookes University		7:29	
2011	Princeton Training Center, U.S.A.	Leander Club & Gloucester Rowing Club		6:38	
2012	Western Rowing Club, Canada	Dortmund Rowing Centre, Germany		7:27	
2013	Leander Club & Oxford Brookes University	Agecroft Rowing Club & Tees Rowing Club	incl: Jessica Eddie, Zoe de Toledo (c)	6:43	
2014	Leander Club and Imperial College	Hollandia Roeiclub, NED	incl: Jessica Eddie, Zoe de Toledo (c)	7:11	
2015	Western Rowing Club, CAN	Leander Club & Imperial College Boat Club		6:48	
2016	Princeton Training Center, U.S.A.	Leander Club & Tees Rowing Club	Heidi Robbins, Kristin O'Brien, Emily Huelskamp, Kendal Schmidt (c)	7:00	
2017	Waiariki Rowing Club, New Zealand	Leander Club & University of London	Emma Dyke, Lucy Spoors, Rebecca Scown, Kelsi Walters, Kelsey Bevan, Georgia Perry, Ashlee Rowe, Ruby Tew, Sam Bosworth (c)	6:44	
2018	Georgina Hope Rinehart NCT, Australia	Leander Club & University of London	Lucy Stephan, Katrina Werry, Hannah Vermeersch, Rosie Popa, Ciona Wilson, Georgina Rowe, Sarah Hawe, Molly Goodman (s), James Rook (c)	6:36	
2019	Waiariki Rowing Club, New Zealand	Leander Club & Imperial College	Ella Greenslade, Kerri Gowler, Beth Ross, Lucy Spoors, Kelsey Bevan, Emma Dyke, Grace Prendergast, Jackie Gowler (s) Caleb Shepherd (c)	6:38	
2020	No competition due to COVID-19 pandemic				
2021	Leander Club	Oxford Brookes & Queen's University, Belfast	Susie Dear, Lauren Irwin, Hope Cessford, Heidi Long, Holly Nixon, Sam Redgrave, Alice Davies, Annie Withers, Morgan Baynham-Williams (c)	7.09	
2022	Imperial College & Leander Club	Rowing Australia	Rebecca Shorten, Heidi Long, Rowan McKellar, Sam Redgrave, Emily Ford, Esme Booth, Rebecca Edwards, Lauren Irwin, Morgan Baynham-Williams (c)	6.37	
2023	Maple Bay RC, Canada	Leander Club	Kirsten Edwards, Alexis Cronk, Kasia Gruchalla-Wesierski, Morgan Rosts, Avalon Wasteneys, Jessica Sevick, Sydney Payne, Kristina Walker, Kristen Kit (c)	7.07	
2024	Oxford Brookes University	Princeton TC & Arion, U.S.A	Claire Feerick, McKenna Simpson, Martha Birtles, Nicole Cusack, Rhianna Sumpter, Brenna Randall, Arianna Forde, Grace Richards, Beatrice Argyle (c)	7.19	
2025	Hollandia Roeiclub	Molesey & Leander	Nika Vos, Vera Sneijders, Hermijntje Drenth, Ilse Kolkman, Ymkje Clevering, Tinka Offereins, Linn Van Aanholt, Dieuwke Fetter, Hayley Verbunt (c)	6.33cr	

Key

- cr = course record
- (c) = coxswain
