= New Zealand at the 2020 Summer Olympics =

- IOC code: NZL
- NOC: New Zealand Olympic Committee
- Website: www.olympic.org.nz

in Tokyo, Japan 23 July 2021 – 8 August 2021
- Competitors: 212 in 21 sports
- Flag bearers (opening): Sarah Hirini; David Nyika
- Flag bearer (closing): Valerie Adams
- Medals Ranked 13th: Gold 7 Silver 6 Bronze 7 Total 20

Summer Olympics appearances (overview)
- 1908; 1912; 1920; 1924; 1928; 1932; 1936; 1948; 1952; 1956; 1960; 1964; 1968; 1972; 1976; 1980; 1984; 1988; 1992; 1996; 2000; 2004; 2008; 2012; 2016; 2020; 2024; 2028

Other related appearances
- Australasia (1908–1912)

New Zealand competed at the 2020 Summer Olympics in Tokyo. Originally scheduled to take place from 24 July to 9 August 2020, the 2020 Games were postponed to 23 July to 8 August 2021 because of the COVID-19 pandemic. It was the country's twenty-fourth appearance as an independent nation at the Summer Olympics, having made its debut at the 1920 Summer Olympics in Antwerp and competed at every Games since. The New Zealand team consisted of 212 athletes, 112 men and 100 women, across twenty-one sports.

The New Zealand team collected a total of 20 medals, seven gold, six silver and seven bronze, at these Games, surpassing the record of 18 gained at the 2016 Summer Olympics. The seven gold medals collected was second only to the eight medals collected at the 1984 Summer Olympics. Rowing led the sports with five medals, followed by canoeing with three medals, two medals in each of rugby sevens, cycling and athletics, and one medal in each of sailing, golf, boxing, trampolining, tennis and triathlon. It was the first time New Zealand won medals in trampolining (and gymnastics in general) and tennis.

Sprint canoeist Lisa Carrington won gold medals in the women's K-1 200 metres, K-1 500 metres and with Caitlin Regal in the K-2 500 metres to become New Zealand's most successful Olympian with six medals in all, including five gold medals. Rower Emma Twigg claimed the gold medal in the women's single sculls after finishing fourth in the previous two Games. The men's rowing eight claimed the gold medal for the first time since 1972, with Hamish Bond becoming the first New Zealander to win a gold medal at three successive Olympics. Rowing pair Kerri Gowler and Grace Prendergast won the gold medal in the women's pair before helping the women's eight win the silver medal. The women's rugby sevens team beat France 26–12 in the final to claim the gold medal, bettering their silver medal at the 2016 Games.

== Medal tables ==
Unless otherwise stated, all dates and times are in Japan Standard Time (UTC+9), three hours behind New Zealand Standard Time (UTC+12).

Medal	Name	Sport	Event	Date
Gold	Kerri Gowler; Grace Prendergast	Rowing	Women's coxless pair	29 July
Gold	Emma Twigg	Rowing	Women's single sculls	30 July
Gold	Tom Mackintosh; Hamish Bond; Tom Murray; Michael Brake; Dan Williamson; Phillip Wilson; Shaun Kirkham; Matt Macdonald; Sam Bosworth (cox)	Rowing	Men's eight	30 July
Gold	New Zealand women's rugby sevens team: Michaela Blyde; Kelly Brazier; Gayle Broughton; Theresa Fitzpatrick; Stacey Fluhler; Sarah Hirini; Shiray Kaka; Tyla Nathan-Wong; Risi Pouri-Lane; Alena Saili; Ruby Tui; Tenika Willison; Portia Woodman	Rugby sevens	Women's tournament	31 July
Gold	Lisa Carrington	Canoeing	Women's K-1 200 metres	3 August
Gold	Lisa Carrington; Caitlin Regal	Canoeing	Women's K-2 500 metres	3 August
Gold	Lisa Carrington	Canoeing	Women's K-1 500 metres	5 August
Silver	Brooke Donoghue; Hannah Osborne	Rowing	Women's double sculls	28 July
Silver	New Zealand men's rugby sevens team: Kurt Baker; Scott Curry; Dylan Collier; Andrew Knewstubb; Ngarohi McGarvey-Black; Tim Mikkelson; Sione Molia; Etene Nanai-Seturo; Tone Ng Shiu; Amanaki Nicole; William Warbrick; Regan Ware; Joe Webber	Rugby sevens	Men's tournament	28 July
Silver	Ella Greenslade; Emma Dyke; Lucy Spoors; Kelsey Bevan; Grace Prendergast; Kerri Gowler; Beth Ross; Jackie Gowler; Caleb Shepherd (cox)	Rowing	Women's eight	30 July
Silver	Peter Burling; Blair Tuke	Sailing	Men's 49er	3 August
Silver	Ellesse Andrews	Cycling	Women's keirin	5 August
Silver	Campbell Stewart	Cycling	Men's omnium	5 August
Bronze	Hayden Wilde	Triathlon	Men's triathlon	26 July
Bronze	Marcus Daniell; Michael Venus	Tennis	Men's doubles	30 July
Bronze	Dylan Schmidt	Gymnastics	Men's trampoline	31 July
Bronze	Valerie Adams	Athletics	Women's shot put	1 August
Bronze	David Nyika	Boxing	Men's heavyweight	3 August
Bronze	Tom Walsh	Athletics	Men's shot put	5 August
Bronze	Lydia Ko	Golf	Women's tournament	7 August

Medals by sport
Sport	Gold medal	Silver medal	Bronze medal	Total
Rowing	3	2	0	5
Canoeing	3	0	0	3
Rugby sevens	1	1	0	2
Cycling	0	2	0	2
Sailing	0	1	0	1
Athletics	0	0	2	2
Boxing	0	0	1	1
Golf	0	0	1	1
Gymnastics	0	0	1	1
Tennis	0	0	1	1
Triathlon	0	0	1	1
Total	7	6	7	20

Medals by date
Date	Gold medal	Silver medal	Bronze medal	Total
24 July	0	0	0	0
25 July	0	0	0	0
26 July	0	0	1	1
27 July	0	0	0	0
28 July	0	2	0	2
29 July	1	0	0	1
30 July	2	1	1	4
31 July	1	0	1	2
1 August	0	0	1	1
2 August	0	0	0	0
3 August	2	1	1	4
4 August	0	0	0	0
5 August	1	2	1	4
6 August	0	0	0	0
7 August	0	0	1	1
8 August	0	0	0	0
Total	7	6	7	20

Medals by gender
Gender	Gold medal	Silver medal	Bronze medal	Total
Male	1	3	5	9
Female	6	3	2	11
Mixed	0	0	0	0
Total	7	6	7	20

Multiple medallists
Name	Sport	1st place, gold medalist(s)	2nd place, silver medalist(s)	3rd place, bronze medalist(s)	Total
Lisa Carrington	Canoeing	3	0	0	3
Kerri Gowler	Rowing	1	1	0	2
Grace Prendergast	Rowing	1	1	0	2

== Officials ==
Former rower Rob Waddell was the New Zealand chef de mission for the 2020 Tokyo Olympics, having served in the same role at the 2016 Rio Olympics.

== Competitors ==
The following is the list of number of competitors in the Games. Reserves in field hockey, football, and rowing are not counted.

Sport	Men	Women	Total
Athletics	8	5	13
Boxing	1	0	1
Canoeing	3	5	8
Cycling	12	8	19
Diving	1	0	1
Equestrian	5	1	6
Field hockey	16	16	32
Football	22	22	44
Golf	1	1	2
Gymnastics	2	1	3
Karate	0	1	1
Rowing	15	15	30
Rugby sevens	13	13	26
Sailing	7	3	10
Shooting	0	2	2
Surfing	1	1	2
Swimming	2	5	7
Taekwondo	1	0	1
Tennis	2	0	2
Triathlon	2	2	4
Weightlifting	2	3	5
Total	116	104	220

Seventeen-year-old swimmer Erika Fairweather (born 31 December 2003) was New Zealand's youngest competitor, while 51-year-old equestrian showjumper Bruce Goodin (born 10 November 1969) was the oldest competitor. Thirty-three competitors (15.6 percent) were of Māori descent.

== Athletics ==
New Zealand athletes further achieved the entry standards, either by qualifying time or by world ranking, in the following track and field events (up to a maximum of three athletes in each event):

Fifteen track and field athletes were officially named to the New Zealand team on 16 April 2021, with shot putter and triple Olympic medalist Valerie Adams leading them to her historic fifth Games. Notable athletes also featured multiple medallist Nick Willis in the middle-distance running and the reigning Commonwealth Games champion and Rio 2016 bronze medalist Tom Walsh in the men's shot put.

Key

- Note–Ranks given for track events are within the athlete's heat only
- Q = Qualified for the next round
- q = Qualified for the next round as a fastest loser or, in field events, by position without achieving the qualifying target
- NR = National record
- N/A = Round not applicable for the event
- Bye = Athlete not required to compete in round

Track & road events

Athlete	Event	Heat		Semifinal		Final	
Athlete	Event	Result	Rank	Result	Rank	Result	Rank
Sam Tanner	Men's 1500 m	3:43.22	9	Did not advance			
Nick Willis	Men's 1500 m	3:36.88	7 q	3:35.41	9	Did not advance	
Malcolm Hicks	Men's marathon	—N/a				2:23:12	64
Zane Robertson	Men's marathon	—N/a				2:17:04	36
Quentin Rew	Men's 50 km walk	—N/a				3:57:33	16
Camille Buscomb	Women's 5000 m	15:24.39	14	—N/a		Did not advance	
Camille Buscomb	Women's 10000 m	—N/a				32:10.49	20

Field events

Athlete	Event	Qualification		Final	
Athlete	Event	Distance	Position	Distance	Position
Hamish Kerr	Men's high jump	2.28	=4 q	2.30	10
Jacko Gill	Men's shot put	20.96	9 q	20.71	9
Tom Walsh	Men's shot put	21.49	2 Q	22.47	3rd place, bronze medalist(s)
Valerie Adams	Women's shot put	18.83	6 Q	19.62	3rd place, bronze medalist(s)
Maddi Wesche	Women's shot put	18.65	11 q	18.98	6
Lauren Bruce	Women's hammer throw	67.71	23	Did not advance	
Julia Ratcliffe	Women's hammer throw	73.20	6 q	72.69	9

== Boxing ==
New Zealand entered one male boxer into the Olympic tournament for the first time since 2004. 2014 and 2018 Commonwealth Games champion David Nyika scored an outright quarterfinal victory to secure a spot in the men's heavyweight division at the 2020 Asia & Oceania Qualification Tournament in Amman, Jordan.

Athlete	Event	Round of 32	Round of 16	Quarterfinals	Semifinals	Final	
Athlete	Event	Opposition Result	Opposition Result	Opposition Result	Opposition Result	Opposition Result	Rank
David Nyika	Men's heavyweight	Bye	Baalla (MAR); W 5–0	Smiahlikau (BLR); W 5–0	Gadzhimagomedov (ROC); L 1–4	Did not advance	3rd place, bronze medalist(s)

== Canoeing ==
=== Slalom ===
New Zealand canoeists qualified one boat for each of the following classes through the 2019 ICF Canoe Slalom World Championships in La Seu d'Urgell, Spain. Former software engineer Callum Gilbert, with Rio 2016 silver medalist Luuka Jones paddling along her way to fourth straight Olympics, was officially named to the New Zealand's slalom canoeing roster on 12 March 2020.

Athlete	Event	Preliminary						Semifinal		Final	
Athlete	Event	Run 1	Rank	Run 2	Rank	Best	Rank	Time	Rank	Time	Rank
Callum Gilbert	Men's K-1	151.85	23	101.15	20	101.15	23	Did not advance			
Luuka Jones	Women's C-1	116.55	8	115.19	9	115.19	11 Q	130.39	13	Did not advance	
Luuka Jones	Women's K-1	110.22	10	101.72	3	101.72	3 Q	108.97	5 Q	110.67	6

=== Sprint ===
New Zealand canoeists qualified four boats in each of the following distances for the Games through the 2019 ICF Canoe Sprint World Championships in Szeged, Hungary and the 2020 Oceania Championships in Penrith, New South Wales. Max Brown and Kurtis Imrie were officially named to the New Zealand canoe sprint roster for the Games on 21 April 2021, with the women's kayak squad, led by two-time defending Lisa Carrington, joining them two months later.

Athlete	Event	Heats		Quarterfinals		Semifinals		Final	
Athlete	Event	Time	Rank	Time	Rank	Time	Rank	Time	Rank
Max Brown; Kurtis Imrie	Men's K-2 1000 m	3:17.210	4 QF	3:10.220	2 SF	3:17.684	2 FA	3:17.267	5
Lisa Carrington	Women's K-1 200 m	40.715	1 SF	Bye		38.127 OB	1 FA	38:120 OB	1st place, gold medalist(s)
Lisa Carrington	Women's K-1 500 m	1:48.463	1 SF	Bye		1:51.680	1 FA	1:51.216	1st place, gold medalist(s)
Caitlin Regal	Women's K-1 500 m	1:50.297	3 SF	Bye		1:53.495	3 FB	1:53.681	9
Lisa Carrington; Caitlin Regal	Women's K-2 500 m	1:43.836	1 SF	Bye		1:36.724 OB	1 FA	1:35.785 OB	1st place, gold medalist(s)
Teneale Hatton; Alicia Hoskin	Women's K-2 500 m	1:49.832	4 QF	1:50.507	4 SF	1:44.119	8 FB	1:41.121	14
Lisa Carrington; Teneale Hatton; Alicia Hoskin; Caitlin Regal	Women's K-4 500 m	1:33.959	2 SF	Bye		1:36.293	2 FA	1:37.168	4

Qualification Legend: FA = Qualify to final (medal); FB = Qualify to final B (non-medal)

== Cycling ==
=== Road ===
New Zealand entered two riders to compete in the men's Olympic road race, by virtue of their top 50 national finish (for men) in the UCI World Ranking. The road cycling team was officially named to the New Zealand roster for the Games on 17 June 2021.

Athlete	Event	Time	Rank
George Bennett	Men's road race	6:11:46	26
George Bennett	Men's time trial	1:00:28.39	25
Patrick Bevin	Men's road race	Did not finish	
Patrick Bevin	Men's time trial	57:24.29	10

=== Track ===
Following the completion of the 2020 UCI Track Cycling World Championships, New Zealand riders accumulated spots for both men and women in the team pursuit and madison, as well as the men's team sprint, based on their country's results in the final UCI Olympic rankings. As a result of their place in the men's team sprint, New Zealand won its right to enter two riders in the men's sprint and keirin.

On 19 November 2020, the New Zealand Olympic Committee officially named a fifteen-member track cycling squad for the rescheduled Tokyo 2020, with Aaron Gate, Jaime Nielsen, Rushlee Buchanan, and Rio 2016 team sprint silver medallist Ethan Mitchell racing around the velodrome at their third straight Olympics.

Sprint

Athlete	Event	Qualification		Round 1	Repechage 1	Round 2	Repechage 2	Round 3	Repechage 3	Quarterfinals	Semifinals	Final	
Athlete	Event	Time Speed (km/h)	Rank	Opposition Time Speed (km/h)	Opposition Time Speed (km/h)	Opposition Time Speed (km/h)	Opposition Time Speed (km/h)	Opposition Time Speed (km/h)	Opposition Time Speed (km/h)	Opposition Time Speed (km/h)	Opposition Time Speed (km/h)	Opposition Time Speed (km/h)	Rank
Ethan Mitchell	Men's sprint	9.705; 74.189	24 Q	Hoogland (NED); L	Awang (MAS); Quintero (COL); L	Did not advance							
Sam Webster	Men's sprint	9.631; 74.759	18 Q	Rudyk (POL); W 10.099; 71.294	Bye	Vigier (FRA); W 9.845; 73.134	Bye	Levy (GER); L	Vigier (FRA); Sahrom (MAS); L	Did not advance			
Ellesse Andrews	Women's sprint	10.563; 68.162	11 Q	McCulloch (AUS); W 10.996; 65.478	Bye	Starikova (UKR); L	Bao Sj (CHN); W 11.144; 64.609	Mitchell (CAN); L	Zhong Ts (CHN); Starikova (UKR); L	Did not advance			
Kirstie James	Women's sprint	11.116; 64.772	27	Did not advance									

Team sprint

Athlete	Event	Qualification		Semifinals		Final	
Athlete	Event	Time Speed (km/h)	Rank	Opposition Time Speed (km/h)	Rank	Opposition Time Speed (km/h)	Rank
Sam Dakin; Ethan Mitchell; Sam Webster; Callum Saunders (Note: Saunders raced in the seventh-place final, replacing Sam Dakin)	Men's team sprint	43.066; 62.694	5	France; L 42.978; 62.823	7	Poland; W 43.703; 61.781	7

Pursuit

Athlete	Event	Qualification		Semifinals		Final	
Athlete	Event	Time	Rank	Opponent Results	Rank	Opponent Results	Rank
Aaron Gate; Regan Gough; Jordan Kerby; Campbell Stewart	Men's team pursuit	3:46.079	3 Q	Italy; L 3:42.397	3 FB	Australia; L OVL	4
Bryony Botha; Rushlee Buchanan; Holly Edmondston; Jaime Nielsen	Women's team pursuit	4:12.536	6 q	Australia; L 4:10.223	7	France; L 4:10.600	8

Qualification legend: Q: qualified, in contention for gold medal final; q: qualified, in contention for bronze medal final; FB: qualified for bronze medal final

Keirin

Athlete	Event	1st Round	Repechage	Quarterfinals	Semifinals	Final
Athlete	Event	Rank	Rank	Rank	Rank	Rank
Callum Saunders	Men's keirin	2 Q	Bye	5	Did not advance	
Sam Webster	Men's keirin	5 R	3	Did not advance		
Ellesse Andrews	Women's keirin	4 R	1 Q	2 Q	2 Q	2nd place, silver medalist(s)

Omnium

Athlete	Event	Scratch race		Tempo race		Elimination race		Points race		Total	
Athlete	Event	Rank	Points	Rank	Points	Rank	Points	Rank	Points	Points	Rank
Campbell Stewart	Men's omnium	7	28	12	18	5	32	1	51	129	2nd place, silver medalist(s)
Holly Edmondston	Women's omnium	9	24	14	14	10	22	=5	7	67	10

Madison

Athlete	Event	Sprint points	Lap points	Total points	Rank
Campbell Stewart; Corbin Strong	Men's madison	3	−20	−17	11
Rushlee Buchanan; Jessie Hodges	Women's madison	1	−40	−39	11

=== Mountain biking ===
New Zealand qualified one mountain biker for the men's Olympic cross-country race, as a result of his nation's sixteenth-place finish in the UCI Olympic Ranking List of 16 May 2021. The New Zealand Olympic Committee nominated Anton Cooper to occupy the slot for the rescheduled Games on 17 June 2021.

Athlete	Event	Time	Rank
Anton Cooper	Men's cross-country	1:26:00	6

=== BMX ===
New Zealand riders qualified for one women's quota place in BMX at the Olympics, as a result of the nation's ninth-place finish in the UCI BMX Olympic Qualification Ranking List of 1 June 2021. The New Zealand Olympic Committee nominated the BMX rider Rebecca Petch to occupy the slot for the rescheduled Games on 17 June 2021.

Athlete	Event	Quarterfinal		Semifinal		Final	
Athlete	Event	Points	Rank	Points	Rank	Result	Rank
Rebecca Petch	Women's race	10	3 Q	16	6	Did not advance	

== Diving ==
For the first time since Los Angeles 1984, New Zealand sent one male diver into the Olympic competition by finishing in the top eighteen of the men's springboard at the 2021 FINA Diving World Cup in Tokyo.

Athlete	Event	Preliminary		Semifinal		Final	
Athlete	Event	Points	Rank	Points	Rank	Points	Rank
Anton Down-Jenkins	Men's 3 m springboard	394.45	16 Q	424.80	8 Q	415.60	8

== Equestrian ==
New Zealand fielded a squad of three equestrian riders each in the team eventing and jumping competitions through the 2018 FEI World Equestrian Games in Tryon, North Carolina, United States and the International Equestrian Federation (FEI)-designated Olympic jumping qualifier for Group G (South East Asia and Oceania) in Valkenswaard, Netherlands. MeanwhIle, one dressage rider was added to the New Zealand roster by finishing in the top two, outside the group selection, of the individual FEI Olympic Rankings for Group G (South East Asia and Oceania).

Shortly before the Olympics, New Zealand withdrew from competing in dressage. The nation's leading rider Melissa Galloway cited the disrupted preparations amidst the COVID-19 pandemic, EHV-1 outbreak and Brexit as the reason behind the withdrawal.

=== Eventing ===
The New Zealand eventing team was named on 29 June 2021. Bundy Philpott and Tresca have been named the travelling reserves.

Athlete	Horse	Event	Dressage		Cross-country			Jumping						Total	
Athlete	Horse	Event	Dressage		Cross-country			Qualifier			Final			Total	
Athlete	Horse	Event	Penalties	Rank	Penalties	Total	Rank	Penalties	Total	Rank	Penalties	Total	Rank	Penalties	Rank
Jesse Campbell	Diachello	Individual	30.10	15	14.40	44.50	27	0.40	44.90	22 Q	9.60	54.50	22	54.40	22
Jonelle Price	Grovine de Reve	Individual	30.70	17	2.00	32.70	12	0.00	32.70	9 Q	9.20	41.90	11	41.90	11
Tim Price	Vitali	Individual	25.60	5	1.20	26.80	4	12.00	38.80	16 Q	21.60	60.40	25	60.40	25
Jesse Campbell; Jonelle Price; Tim Price	See above	Team	86.40	3	17.60	104.0	4	12.40	116.40	5	—N/a			116.40	5

=== Jumping ===
The New Zealand jumping team was named on 22 June 2021. The team consists of three Olympic veterans, while the California-based Uma O'Neill and Clockwise of Greenhill Z have been named the travelling reserves.

Sharn Wordley later withdrew following an injury to his horse. Subsequently, Uma O'Neill got promoted to the team, while Tom Tarver-Priebe and Popeye were assigned the reserve spot. The day before the team competition, a further change was made with Tarver-Priebe (Popeye) replacing O'Neill (Clockwise Of Greenhill Z).

Athlete	Horse	Event	Qualification		Final		
Athlete	Horse	Event	Penalties	Rank	Penalties	Time	Rank
Bruce Goodin	Danny V	Individual	13	=57	Did not advance		
Daniel Meech	Cinca	Individual	2	30 Q	Eliminated		
Uma O'Neill	Clockwise of Greenhill Z	Individual	17	64	Did not advance		
Bruce Goodin; Tom Tarver-Priebe; Daniel Meech	Danny V Popeye; Cinca	Team	39	14	Did not advance		

== Field hockey ==
Summary

Team	Event	Group stage						Quarterfinal	Semifinal	Final / BM	
Team	Event	Opposition Score	Opposition Score	Opposition Score	Opposition Score	Opposition Score	Rank	Opposition Score	Opposition Score	Opposition Score	Rank
New Zealand men's	Men's tournament	India; L 2–3	Spain; W 4–3	Japan; D 2–2	Australia; L 2–4	Argentina; L 1–4	5	Did not advance			9
New Zealand women's	Women's tournament	Argentina; W 3–0	Japan; W 2–1	Spain; L 1–2	Australia; L 0–1	China; L 2–3	4	Netherlands; L 0–3	Did not advance		8

=== Men's tournament ===
New Zealand men's national field hockey team qualified for the Olympics by securing one of the seven tickets available and defeating South Korea in a playoff at the Stratford leg of the 2019 FIH Olympic Qualifiers.

Team roster

The squad was announced on 10 June 2021.

Head coach: Darren Smith

No.	Pos.	Player	Date of birth (age)	Caps	Goals	Club
3	DF	David Brydon	27 June 1996 (aged 25)	58	0	(New Zealand) Southern Alpiners
4	DF	Dane Lett	29 August 1990 (aged 30)	83	2	(New Zealand) Central Falcons
7	MF	Nicholas Ross	26 July 1990 (aged 30)	133	4	(New Zealand) Southern Alpiners
11	FW	Jacob Smith	3 April 1991 (aged 30)	89	12	(New Zealand) Central Falcons
12	FW	Sam Lane	30 April 1997 (aged 24)	70	21	(New Zealand) Southern Alpiners
14	MF	Jared Panchia	18 October 1993 (aged 27)	139	26	(New Zealand) Hauraki Mavericks
17	DF	Nicholas Woods	26 August 1995 (aged 25)	131	21	(New Zealand) Hauraki Mavericks
20	GK	Leon Hayward	23 April 1990 (aged 31)	12	0	(New Zealand) Hauraki Mavericks
21	DF	Kane Russell	22 April 1992 (aged 29)	167	71	(New Zealand) Southern Alpiners
22	DF	Blair Tarrant (Captain)	11 May 1990 (aged 31)	217	4	(New Zealand) Southern Alpiners
23	MF	Dylan Thomas	14 February 1996 (aged 25)	32	2	(New Zealand) Central Falcons
24	MF	Sean Findlay	5 December 2001 (aged 19)	6	1	(New Zealand) Central Falcons
25	DF	Shea McAleese	7 August 1984 (aged 36)	316	34	(New Zealand) Central Falcons
27	FW	Stephen Jenness	7 June 1990 (aged 31)	254	92	(New Zealand) Central Falcons
29	MF	Hugo Inglis	18 January 1991 (aged 30)	237	66	(New Zealand) Southern Alpiners
30	FW	George Muir	24 February 1994 (aged 27)	146	18	(New Zealand) North Harbour
31	MF	Steve Edwards	25 January 1986 (aged 35)	226	23	(New Zealand) Northern Tridents
32	FW	Nicholas Wilson	6 August 1990 (aged 30)	176	77	(New Zealand) Central Falcons

Group play

Pos	Team	Pld	W	D	L	GF	GA	GD	Pts	Qualification
1	Australia	5	4	1	0	22	9	+13	13	Quarter-finals
2	India	5	4	0	1	15	13	+2	12	Quarter-finals
3	Argentina	5	2	1	2	10	11	−1	7	Quarter-finals
4	Spain	5	1	2	2	9	10	−1	5	Quarter-finals
5	New Zealand	5	1	1	3	11	16	−5	4	
6	Japan (H)	5	0	1	4	10	18	−8	1	

Source: Tokyo 2020 and FIH
Rules for classification: 1) points; 2) matches won; 3) goal difference; 4) goals for; 5) head-to-head result; 6) field goals scored.
(H) Hosts

24 July 2021
10:00
v

New Zealand	2–3	India
Russell 6'; Jenness 43'	Report	Rupinder 10'; Harmanpreet 26', 33'

South Pitch
Umpires:
Martin Madden (SCO)
Coen van Bunge (NED)

25 July 2021
20:45
v

Spain	3–4	New Zealand
González 26'; Quemada 31'; Boltó 39'	Report	Jenness 14'; Tarrant 27'; Russell 48'; Smith 57'

North Pitch
Umpires:
Lim Hong Zhen (SGP)
Adam Kearns (AUS)

27 July 2021
11:45
v

Japan	2–2	New Zealand
Yamasaki 3'; Ke. Tanaka 40'	Report	Wilson 11'; Lane 41'

North Pitch
Umpires:
Ben Göntgen (GER)
Germán Montes de Oca (ARG)

28 July 2021
21:15
v

Australia	4–2	New Zealand
Brand 9', 50'; Govers 55'; Wickham 57'	Report	Russell 13', 58'

South Pitch
Umpires:
Francisco Vázquez (ESP)
Marcin Grochal (POL)

30 July 2021
19:00
v

Argentina	4–1	New Zealand
Martínez 15+'; Vila 17'; Tolini 44'; Keenan 60'	Report	Russell 14'

South Pitch
Umpires:
Martin Madden (GBR)
Coen van Bunge (NED)

=== Women's tournament ===
New Zealand women's field hockey team qualified for the Olympics by winning the gold medal on a goal difference over Australia at the 2019 Oceania Cup in Rockhampton, Queensland.

Team roster

The squad was announced on 10 June 2021.

Head coach: (Ireland) Graham Shaw

No.	Pos.	Player	Date of birth (age)	Caps	Goals	Club
1	DF	Tarryn Davey	29 February 1996 (aged 25)	66	1	(New Zealand) Hauraki Mavericks
2	FW	Olivia Shannon	23 May 2001 (aged 20)	29	4	(New Zealand) Central Falcons
4	FW	Olivia Merry	16 March 1992 (aged 29)	236	113	(New Zealand) Southern Alpiners
5	DF	Frances Davies	18 October 1996 (aged 24)	81	0	(New Zealand) Southern Alpiners
6	FW	Hope Ralph	14 April 2000 (aged 21)	11	2	(New Zealand) Central Falcons
8	MF	Julia King	8 December 1992 (aged 28)	125	9	(New Zealand) Hauraki Mavericks
12	DF	Ella Gunson	9 July 1989 (aged 32)	224	11	(New Zealand) Northern Tridents
13	MF	Sam Charlton	7 December 1991 (aged 29)	255	8	(New Zealand) Midlands
15	GK	Grace O'Hanlon	10 September 1992 (aged 28)	63	0	(New Zealand) Hauraki Mavericks
16	DF	Elizabeth Thompson	8 December 1994 (aged 26)	191	12	(New Zealand) Hauraki Mavericks
17	DF	Stephanie Dickins	9 January 1995 (aged 26)	27	2	(New Zealand) Northern Tridents
19	DF	Tessa Jopp	18 June 1995 (aged 26)	26	1	(New Zealand) Southern Alpiners
20	DF	Megan Hull	12 May 1996 (aged 25)	35	1	(New Zealand) Central Falcons
22	MF	Katie Doar	11 September 2001 (aged 19)	19	0	(New Zealand) Northern Tridents
24	MF	Rose Keddell	31 January 1994 (aged 27)	211	16	(New Zealand) Hauraki Mavericks
25	MF	Kelsey Smith	11 August 1994 (aged 26)	99	14	(New Zealand) Central Falcons
27	FW	Holly Pearson	7 September 1998 (aged 22)	24	0	(New Zealand) Central Falcons
31	MF	Stacey Michelsen (Captain)	18 February 1991 (aged 30)	291	34	(New Zealand) Northern Tridents

Group play

Pos	Team	Pld	W	D	L	GF	GA	GD	Pts	Qualification
1	Australia	5	5	0	0	13	1	+12	15	Quarterfinals
2	Spain	5	3	0	2	9	8	+1	9	Quarterfinals
3	Argentina	5	3	0	2	8	8	0	9	Quarterfinals
4	New Zealand	5	2	0	3	8	7	+1	6	Quarterfinals
5	China	5	2	0	3	9	16	−7	6	
6	Japan (H)	5	0	0	5	6	13	−7	0	

Source: Tokyo 2020 and FIH
Rules for classification: 1) points; 2) matches won; 3) goal difference; 4) goals for; 5) head-to-head result; 6) field goals scored.
(H) Hosts

25 July 2021
12:15
v

New Zealand	3–0	Argentina
Smith 35'; Ralph 40'; Pearson 54'	Report

South Pitch
Umpires:
Sarah Wilson (GBR)
Maggie Giddens (USA)

26 July 2021
20:45
v

Japan	1–2	New Zealand
Oikawa 18'	Report	Merry 26'; Ralph 29'

North Pitch
Umpires:
Irene Presenqui (ARG)
Annelize Rostron (RSA)

28 July 2021
11:45
v

New Zealand	1–2	Spain
Smith 35'	Report	Iglesias 8'; Riera 22'

North Pitch
Umpires:
Carolina de la Fuente (ARG)
Michelle Meister (GER)

29 July 2021
21:15
v

New Zealand	0–1	Australia
	Report	Chalker 34'

South Pitch
Umpires:
Sarah Wilson (GBR)
Laurine Delforge (BEL)

31 July 2021
09:30
v

China	3–2	New Zealand
Liu 24'; Chen Y. 37'; Liang 54'	Report	Gunson 20'; Keddell 45'

North Pitch
Umpires:
Laurine Delforge (BEL)
Ayanna McClean (TTO)

Quarterfinal

2 August 2021
18:30
v

Netherlands	3–0	New Zealand
Welten 7'; Matla 21'; Stam 37'	Report

Umpires:
Michelle Meister (GER)
Michelle Joubert (RSA)

== Football ==
Summary

Key:

- A.E.T. – After extra time.
- P – Match decided by penalty-shootout.

Team	Event	Group stage				Quarterfinal	Semifinal	Final / BM	
Team	Event	Opposition Score	Opposition Score	Opposition Score	Rank	Opposition Score	Opposition Score	Opposition Score	Rank
New Zealand men's	Men's tournament	South Korea; W 1–0	Honduras; L 2–3	Romania; D 0–0	2	Japan; L 2–4^{P} 0–0 (a.e.t.)	Did not advance		6
New Zealand women's	Women's tournament	Australia; L 1–2	United States; L 1–6	Sweden; L 0–2	4	Did not advance			12

=== Men's tournament ===
New Zealand men's football team qualified for the Olympics by winning the gold medal and securing an outright berth at the 2019 OFC Olympic Qualifying Tournament in Fiji.

Team roster

New Zealand's 18-man squad was announced on 25 June 2021. As well as the reserves players named, Tim Payne was named as a replacement in the event that Winston Reid didn't receive a release to travel. On 2 July 2021, Reid was confirmed as available for selection.

Head coach: Danny Hay

No.	Pos.	Player	Date of birth (age)	Caps	Goals	Club
1	GK	Michael Woud	16 January 1999 (aged 22)	2	0	(Royal Dutch Football Association) Almere City
2	DF	Winston Reid* (captain)	3 July 1988 (aged 33)	2	0	(The Football Association) Brentford
3	DF	Liberato Cacace	27 September 2000 (aged 20)	6	0	(Royal Belgian Football Association) Sint-Truiden
4	DF	Nando Pijnaker	25 February 1999 (aged 22)	2	0	(Portuguese Football Federation) Rio Ave
5	DF	Michael Boxall*	18 August 1988 (aged 32)	12	1	(United States Soccer Federation) Minnesota United
6	MF	Clayton Lewis	12 February 1997 (aged 24)	12	4	(New Zealand Football) Wellington Phoenix
7	FW	Elijah Just	1 May 2000 (aged 21)	2	1	(Danish Football Association) Helsingør
8	MF	Joe Bell	27 April 1999 (aged 22)	2	0	(Norwegian Football Federation) Viking
9	FW	Chris Wood*	7 December 1991 (aged 29)	7	2	(The Football Association) Burnley
10	MF	Marko Stamenic	19 February 2002 (aged 19)	1	0	(Danish Football Association) Copenhagen
11	FW	Joe Champness	27 April 1997 (aged 24)	2	0	(Football Australia) Brisbane Roar
12	FW	Callum McCowatt	30 April 1999 (aged 22)	2	0	(Danish Football Association) Helsingør
13	GK	Jamie Searle	25 November 2000 (aged 20)	1	0	(Football Association of Wales) Swansea City
14	DF	George Stanger	15 August 2000 (aged 20)	3	0	(Scottish Football Association) Hamilton Academical
15	DF	Dane Ingham	8 June 1999 (aged 22)	2	0	(Football Australia) Perth Glory
16	DF	Gianni Stensness	7 February 1999 (aged 22)	9	0	(Football Australia) Central Coast Mariners
17	DF	Callan Elliot	7 July 1999 (aged 22)	5	1	(Hellenic Football Federation) Xanthi
18	FW	Ben Waine	11 June 2001 (aged 20)	7	8	(New Zealand Football) Wellington Phoenix
19	FW	Matthew Garbett	13 April 2002 (aged 19)	1	0	(Swedish Football Association) Falkenbergs FF
20	MF	Sam Sutton	10 December 2001 (aged 19)	2	0	(New Zealand Football) Wellington Phoenix
21	MF	Ben Old	13 August 2002 (aged 18)	0	0	(New Zealand Football) Lower Hutt City
22	GK	Alex Paulsen	4 July 2002 (aged 19)	1	0	(New Zealand Football) Lower Hutt City

* Overage player.

Group play

Pos	Team	Pld	W	D	L	GF	GA	GD	Pts	Qualification
1	South Korea	3	2	0	1	10	1	+9	6	Advance to knockout stage
2	New Zealand	3	1	1	1	3	3	0	4	Advance to knockout stage
3	Romania	3	1	1	1	1	4	−3	4	
4	Honduras	3	1	0	2	3	9	−6	3	

Source: TOCOG and FIFA
Rules for classification: Group stage tiebreakers
22 July 2021
17:00

New Zealand	1–0	South Korea
Wood 70'	Report (TOCOG); Report (FIFA)

Kashima Stadium, Kashima
Referee: Victor Gomes (South Africa)

25 July 2021
17:00

New Zealand	2–3	Honduras
Cacace 10'; Wood 49'	Report (TOCOG); Report (FIFA)	Palma 45+1'; Obregón 78'; Rivas 87'

Kashima Stadium, Kashima
Referee: Orel Grinfeld (Israel)

28 July 2021
17:30

Romania	0–0	New Zealand
	Report (TOCOG); Report (FIFA)

Sapporo Dome, Sapporo
Referee: Kevin Ortega (Peru)

Quarter-final

31 July 2021
18:00

Japan	0–0 (a.e.t.)	New Zealand
	Report (TOCOG); Report (FIFA)
Penalties
Ueda (penalty scored); Itakura (penalty scored); Nakayama (penalty scored); Yoshida (penalty scored)	4–2	(penalty scored) Wood; (penalty missed) Cacace; (penalty missed) Lewis; (penalty scored) McCowatt

Kashima Stadium, Kashima
Referee: Ismail Elfath (United States)

=== Women's tournament ===
New Zealand women's football team qualified for the Olympics by winning the gold medal and securing an outright berth at the 2018 OFC Women's Nations Cup in New Caledonia.

Team roster

The final squad of 22 athletes was announced on 25 June 2021.

Head coach: (Scotland) Tom Sermanni

No.	Pos.	Player	Date of birth (age)	Caps	Goals	Club
1	GK	Erin Nayler	17 April 1992 (aged 29)	71	0	(The Football Association) Reading
2	MF	Ria Percival	7 December 1989 (aged 31)	150	14	(The Football Association) Tottenham Hotspur
3	DF	Anna Green	20 August 1990 (aged 30)	77	7	(New Zealand Football) Lower Hutt City
4	DF	C. J. Bott	22 April 1995 (aged 26)	24	1	(Norwegian Football Federation) Vålerenga Fotball Damer
5	DF	Meikayla Moore	4 June 1996 (aged 25)	41	3	(The Football Association) Liverpool
6	DF	Claudia Bunge	21 September 1999 (aged 21)	4	0	(Football Australia) Melbourne Victory
7	DF	Ali Riley (captain)	30 October 1987 (aged 33)	134	1	(United States Soccer Federation) Orlando Pride
8	DF	Abby Erceg	20 November 1989 (aged 31)	141	6	(United States Soccer Federation) North Carolina Courage
9	FW	Gabi Rennie	7 July 2001 (aged 20)	0	0	(United States Soccer Federation) Indiana Hoosiers
10	MF	Annalie Longo	1 July 1991 (aged 30)	123	15	(Football Australia) Melbourne Victory
11	MF	Olivia Chance	5 October 1993 (aged 27)	20	1	(Football Australia) Brisbane Roar
12	MF	Betsy Hassett	4 August 1990 (aged 30)	119	13	(Football Association of Iceland) Stjarnan
13	FW	Paige Satchell	13 April 1998 (aged 23)	18	1	(Football Australia) Canberra United
14	MF	Katie Bowen	15 April 1994 (aged 27)	70	3	(United States Soccer Federation) Kansas City NWSL
15	MF	Daisy Cleverley	30 April 1997 (aged 24)	9	2	(United States Soccer Federation) Georgetown Hoyas
16	MF	Emma Rolston	10 November 1996 (aged 24)	5	6	(New Zealand Football) Northern Lights
17	FW	Hannah Wilkinson	28 May 1992 (aged 29)	97	26	(German Football Association) MSV Duisburg
18	GK	Anna Leat	26 June 2001 (aged 20)	4	0	(New Zealand Football) FFDP
19	DF	Elizabeth Anton	12 December 1998 (aged 22)	5	0	(New Zealand Football) FFDP
20	DF	Marisa van der Meer	27 March 2002 (aged 19)	0	0	(New Zealand Football) FFDP
21	FW	Michaela Robertson	28 August 1996 (aged 24)	0	0	(New Zealand Football) Lower Hutt City
22	GK	Victoria Esson	6 March 1991 (aged 30)	3	0	(Norwegian Football Federation) Avaldsnes

Group play

Pos	Team	Pld	W	D	L	GF	GA	GD	Pts	Qualification
1	Sweden	3	3	0	0	9	2	+7	9	Advance to knockout stage
2	United States	3	1	1	1	6	4	+2	4	Advance to knockout stage
3	Australia	3	1	1	1	4	5	−1	4	Advance to knockout stage
4	New Zealand	3	0	0	3	2	10	−8	0	

Source: TOCOG and FIFA
Rules for classification: Group stage tiebreakers
21 July 2021
20:30

Australia	2–1	New Zealand
Yallop 20'; Kerr 33'	Report (TOCOG); Report (FIFA)	Rennie 90+1'

Tokyo Stadium, Chōfu
Attendance: 0
Referee: Lucila Venegas (Mexico)

24 July 2021
20:30

New Zealand	1–6	United States
Hassett 72'	Report (TOCOG); Report (FIFA)	Lavelle 9'; Horan 45'; Erceg 63' (o.g.); Press 80'; Morgan 88'; Bott 90+3' (o.g.)

Saitama Stadium 2002, Saitama
Attendance: 0
Referee: Stéphanie Frappart (France)

27 July 2021
17:00

New Zealand	0–2	Sweden
	Report (TOCOG); Report (FIFA)	Anvegård 17'; Janogy 29'

Miyagi Stadium, Rifu
Attendance: 884
Referee: Laura Fortunato (Argentina)

== Golf ==
New Zealand announced a team of two golfers in July 2021. Danny Lee qualified but chose not to play.

Athlete	Event	Round 1	Round 2	Round 3	Round 4	Total		
Athlete	Event	Score	Score	Score	Score	Score	Par	Rank
Ryan Fox	Men's	70	72	73	64	279	−5	=42
Lydia Ko	Women's	70	67	66	65	268	−16 (Note: Finished tied for second, and lost sudden-death playoff on first hole to win bronze medal)	3rd place, bronze medalist(s)

== Gymnastics ==
=== Artistic ===
New Zealand entered one male artistic gymnast into the Olympic competition by winning the gold medal and securing an outright berth at the 2021 Oceanian Championships in Queensland, Australia.

Men

Athlete	Event	Qualification								Final							
Athlete	Event	Apparatus						Total	Rank	Apparatus						Total	Rank
Athlete	Event	F	PH	R	V	PB	HB	Total	Rank	F	PH	R	V	PB	HB	Total	Rank
Mikhail Koudinov	All-around	13.433	12.466	12.600	13.766	14.433	11.366	78.064	52	Did not advance							

=== Trampoline ===
New Zealand qualified one gymnast each to compete in the men's and women's trampoline by finishing among the top eight nations vying for qualification at the two-year-long World Cup Series. Maddie Davidson will be New Zealand's first female trampolinist at the Olympics.

Athlete	Event	Qualification				Final	
Athlete	Event	Routine 1	Routine 2	Total score	Rank	Score	Rank
Dylan Schmidt	Men's	52.415	59.705	112.120	3 Q	60.675	3rd place, bronze medalist(s)
Maddie Davidson	Women's	47.870	45.270	93.140	10	Did not advance	

== Karate ==
New Zealand entered one karateka into the inaugural Olympic tournament. Alexandrea Anacan secured a place in the women's kata category, as the highest-ranked karateka vying for qualification from the Oceania zone based on the WKD Olympic Rankings.

Kata

Athlete	Event	Elimination round		Ranking round		Final / BM	
Athlete	Event	Score	Rank	Score	Rank	Opposition Result	Rank
Andrea Anacan	Women's kata	23.62	5	Did not advance			

== Rowing ==
New Zealand qualified ten out of fourteen boats for each of the following rowing classes into the Olympic regatta, with the majority of crews confirming Olympic places for their boats at the 2019 FISA World Championships in Ottensheim, Austria. In May 2021, the men's eight crew was added to the New Zealand roster with a top-two finish at the 2021 FISA Final Qualification Regatta in Lucerne, Switzerland.

On 23 April 2021, the New Zealand Olympic Committee declined its quota place in the women's lightweight double sculls, having previously confirmed it from the 2019 Worlds.

Men

Athlete	Event	Heats		Repechage		Quarterfinals		Semifinals		Final	
Athlete	Event	Time	Rank	Time	Rank	Time	Rank	Time	Rank	Time	Rank
Jordan Parry	Single sculls	7:04.45	2 QF	Bye		7:18.48	4 SC/D	6:57.70	1 FC	6:55.55	13
Stephen Jones; Brook Robertson	Pair	6:56.53	3 SA/B	Bye		—N/a		6:41.46	6 FB	6:38.30	12
Chris Harris; Jack Lopas	Double sculls	6:12.05	3 SA/B	Bye		—N/a		6:26.08	4 FB	6:15.51	8
Hamish Bond; Sam Bosworth (cox); Michael Brake; Shaun Kirkham; Matt Macdonald; Tom Mackintosh; Tom Murray; Dan Williamson; Phillip Wilson	Eight	5:32.11	2 R	5:22.04	1 FA	—N/a				5:24.64	1st place, gold medalist(s)

Women

Athlete	Event	Heats		Repechage		Quarterfinals		Semifinals		Final	
Athlete	Event	Time	Rank	Time	Rank	Time	Rank	Time	Rank	Time	Rank
Emma Twigg	Single sculls	7:35.22	1 QF	Bye		7:54.96	1 SA/B	7:20.70	1 FA	7:13.97 OR	1st place, gold medalist(s)
Kerri Gowler; Grace Prendergast	Pair	7:19.08	1 SA/B	Bye		—N/a		6:47.41 WR	1 FA	6:50.19	1st place, gold medalist(s)
Brooke Donoghue; Hannah Osborne	Double sculls	6:53.62	1 SA/B	Bye		—N/a		7:09.05	2 FA	6:44.82	2nd place, silver medalist(s)
Olivia Loe; Eve Macfarlane; Georgia Nugent-O'Leary; Ruby Tew	Quadruple sculls	6:25.23	5 R	6:39.91	3 FB	—N/a				6:29.00	8
Kelsey Bevan; Jackie Gowler; Kerri Gowler; Ella Greenslade; Emma Dyke; Grace Prendergast; Beth Ross; Caleb Shepherd (cox); Lucy Spoors	Eight	6:07.65	1 FA	Bye		—N/a				6:00.04	2nd place, silver medalist(s)

The make up of the eight had initially not been determined, with ten rowers—including two pairs of sisters—who were to travel to the Olympics: Kerri Gowler and Grace Prendergast (who will also compete in the pair), Jackie Gowler, Beth Ross, Phoebe Spoors, Kirstyn Goodger, Kelsey Bevan, Lucy Spoors, Emma Dyke, and Ella Greenslade.

Qualification Legend: FA=Final A (medal); FB=Final B (non-medal); FC=Final C (non-medal); FD=Final D (non-medal); FE=Final E (non-medal); FF=Final F (non-medal); SA/B=Semifinals A/B; SC/D=Semifinals C/D; SE/F=Semifinals E/F; QF=Quarterfinals; R=Repechage

== Rugby sevens ==
Summary

Team	Event	Pool round				Quarterfinal	Semifinal	Final / BM	
Team	Event	Opposition result	Opposition result	Opposition result	Rank	Opposition result	Opposition result	Opposition result	Rank
New Zealand men	Men's tournament	South Korea; W 50–5	Argentina; W 35–14	Australia; W 14–12	1	Canada; W 21–10	Great Britain; W 29–7	Fiji; L 12–27	2nd place, silver medalist(s)
New Zealand women	Women's tournament	Kenya; W 29–7	Great Britain; W 26–21	ROC; W 33–0	1	ROC; W 36–0	Fiji; W 22–17	France; W 26–12	1st place, gold medalist(s)

=== Men's tournament ===
The New Zealand national rugby sevens team qualified for the Olympics by advancing to the quarterfinals in the 2019 London Sevens, securing a top four spot in the 2018–19 World Rugby Sevens Series.

Team roster

New Zealand's 12-man squad plus one alternate was named on 6 July 2021. Amanaki Nicole replaced Sam Dickson due to injury on 23 July 2021.

Head coach: Clark Laidlaw

No.	Pos.	Player	Date of birth (age)	Events	Points
1	FW	Scott Curry (c)	17 May 1988 (aged 33)	54	620
2	FW	Tim Mikkelson (c)	13 August 1986 (aged 34)	91	1,195
3	FW	Tone Ng Shiu	26 May 1994 (aged 27)	27	160
4	BK	Etene Nanai-Seturo	20 August 1999 (aged 21)	11	70
5	FW	Dylan Collier	27 April 1991 (aged 30)	38	255
6	BK	Ngarohi McGarvey-Black	20 May 1996 (aged 25)	12	152
7	FW	Amanaki Nicole	8 February 1992 (aged 29)	50	490
8	BK	Andrew Knewstubb	14 September 1995 (aged 25)	25	527
9	BK	Regan Ware	7 August 1994 (aged 26)	36	490
10	BK	Kurt Baker	7 October 1988 (aged 32)	43	796
11	BK	Joe Webber	27 August 1993 (aged 27)	38	480
12	BK	Sione Molia	5 September 1993 (aged 27)	37	330
13	BK	William Warbrick	6 March 1998 (aged 23)	3	5

Group play

Pos	Team	Pld	W	D	L	PF	PA	PD	Pts	Qualification
1	New Zealand	3	3	0	0	99	31	+68	9	Quarter-finals
2	Argentina	3	2	0	1	99	54	+45	7	Quarter-finals
3	Australia	3	1	0	2	73	48	+25	5	Quarter-finals
4	South Korea	3	0	0	3	10	148	−138	3	

Source: Tokyo 2020 and World Rugby
Rules for classification: 1) Points; 2) Head-to-head result; 3) Point difference; 4) Points scored.

26 July 2021
10:00

New Zealand	50–5	South Korea
Try: Knewstubb 2' c Mikkelson (2) 7' c, 8' m Penalty try 8'; Warbrick (2) 10' c, 14' m Nanai-Seturo 12' m McGarvey-Black 13' c Con: Knewstubb (2/3) 2', 7'; McGarvey-Black (2/3) 10', 13'; Baker (0/1)	(Tokyo 2020)	Try: Jeong 5' m Con: Lee (0/1)

Tokyo Stadium, Tokyo
Attendance: 0
Referee: Sam Grove-White (Scotland)

26 July 2021
17:30

New Zealand	35–14	Argentina
Try: McGarvey-Black 4' c Molia 6' c Webber 10' c Mikkelson 12' c Warbrick 14' c Con: McGarvey-Black (2/2) 5', 7'; Webber (1/1) 10'; Knewstubb (2/2) 13', 14'	(Tokyo 2020)	Try: Moneta 2' c González 8' c Con: Mare (2/2) 2', 8'

Tokyo Stadium, Tokyo
Attendance: 0
Referee: Craig Evans (Wales)

27 July 2021
10:30

New Zealand	14–12	Australia
Try: Collier 8' c Knewstubb 10' c Con: Knewstubb (2/2) 8', 10'	(Tokyo 2020)	Try: Kerevi 1' c Malouf 5' m Con: Holland (1/2) 1'

Tokyo Stadium, Tokyo
Attendance: 0
Referee: Sam Grove-White (Scotland)

Quarter-final

27 July 2021
17:30

New Zealand	21–10	Canada
Try: Knewstubb 4' c Curry (2) 6' c, 7' c Con: Knewstubb (2/2) 4', 6'; Curry (1/1) 7'	(Tokyo 2020)	Try: Kay 13' m Jones 14' m Con: Kay (0/2)

Tokyo Stadium, Tokyo
Attendance: 0
Referee: Jordan Way (Australia)

Semi-final

28 July 2021
11:00

New Zealand	29–7	Great Britain
Try: Curry (2) 2' c, 13' m Ware (2) 7' c, 9' m Collier 10' m Con: Knewstubb (2/4) 2', 7'; McGarvey-Black (0/1)	(Tokyo 2020)	Try: Norton 3' c Con: Bibby (1/1) 3'

Tokyo Stadium, Tokyo
Attendance: 0
Referee: Damon Murphy (Australia)

Gold medal match

28 July 2021
18:00

(silver) New Zealand	12–27	Fiji (gold)
Try: Curry 3' m Molia 8' c Con: Knewstubb (1/2) 8'	(Tokyo 2020)	Try: Derenalagi 1' m Maqala 3' c Wainiqolo 4' c Tuivuaka 11' m Con: Bolaca (2/3) 3', 5'; Nacuqu (0/1); Pen: Nacuqu (1/1) 14'

Tokyo Stadium, Tokyo
Attendance: 0
Referee: Damon Murphy (Australia)

=== Women's tournament ===
The New Zealand women's national rugby sevens team qualified for the Olympics by securing a top four position in the 2018–19 World Rugby Women's Sevens Series through winning the penultimate leg.

Team roster

- Women's team event – 1 team of 12 players

Group play

Pos	Team	Pld	W	D	L	PF	PA	PD	Pts	Qualification
1	New Zealand	3	3	0	0	88	28	+60	9	Quarter-finals
2	Great Britain	3	2	0	1	66	38	+28	7	Quarter-finals
3	ROC	3	1	0	2	47	59	−12	5	Quarter-finals
4	Kenya	3	0	0	3	19	95	−76	3	

Source: Tokyo 2020 and World Rugby
Rules for classification: 1) Points; 2) Head-to-head result; 3) Point difference; 4) Points scored.

29 July 2021
11:30

New Zealand	29–7	Kenya
Try: Fluhler 1' m Blyde (2) 3' c, 9' c Woodman 5' m Broughton 11' m Con: Nathan-Wong (2/5) 3', 9'	(Tokyo 2020)	Try: Lindo 7' +1 c Con: Okulu (1/1) 7' +1

Tokyo Stadium, Tokyo

29 July 2021
18:30

New Zealand	26–21	Great Britain
Try: Blyde (3) 5' c, 7' m, 13' c Nathan-Wong 9' c Con: Nathan-Wong (3/4) 6', 9', 14'	(Tokyo 2020)	Try: Rowland 1' c Jones 2' c Joyce 4' c Con: Aitchison (3/3) 1', 3', 4'

Tokyo Stadium, Tokyo

30 July 2021
13:00 (Note: Originally scheduled for 11:30 but delayed due to weather)

New Zealand	33–0	ROC
Try: Tui (2) 1' c, 6' c Woodman 7' c Fluhler (2) 10' c, 12' m Con: Nathan-Wong (3/3) 2', 6', 7', 10; Willison (0/1)	(Tokyo 2020)

Tokyo Stadium, Tokyo

Quarter-final

30 July 2021
17:30

New Zealand	36–0	ROC
Try: Fitzpatrick 1' c Broughton 2' c Blyde 4' c Woodman (2) 8' c, 13' m Tui 10' c Con: Nathan-Wong (2/4) 1', 8'; Pouri-Lane (1/2) 10'	(Tokyo 2020)

Tokyo Stadium, Tokyo

Semi-final

31 July 2021
11:00

New Zealand	22–17 (a.e.t.)	Fiji
Try: Broughton (2) 2' m, 16' m Woodman 10' c Fluhler 14' m Con: Nathan-Wong (1/3) 11'	(Tokyo 2020)	Try: Solikoviti 4' c, 9' m Ulunisau 14+' m Con: Riwai (1/3) 4'

Tokyo Stadium, Tokyo

Gold medal match

31 July 2021
18:00

New Zealand	26–12	France
Try: Blyde 1' c Broughton 5' m Fluhler 6' c Nathan-Wong 11' c Con: Nathan-Wong (3/4) 1', 7', 11'	(Tokyo 2020)	Try: Drouin 3' m Ciofani 8' c Con: Drouin (1/2) 9'

Tokyo Stadium, Tokyo

== Sailing ==
New Zealand sailors qualified one boat in each of the following classes through the 2018 Sailing World Championships, the class-associated Worlds, and the continental regattas. On 4 March 2020, New Zealand Olympic Committee officially announced the first seven sailors to compete at the Enoshima regatta, including defending 49er champions Peter Burling and Blair Tuke, Rio 2016 49erFX silver medallists Alex Maloney and Molly Meech, and Rio 2016 Laser bronze medallist Sam Meech. The men's 470 crew members Paul Snow-Hansen and Daniel Willcox were named to the New Zealand team on 30 September 2020, with Rio 2016 Olympian Josh Junior completing the sailing selection at the 2021 Finn Gold Cup in Lisbon, Portugal.

At the end of the qualifying window, the New Zealand Olympic Committee officially declined the quota places already obtained at the respective Sailing World Championships in the following classes: men's and women's RS:X, women's Laser Radial, and women's 470.

Men

Athlete	Event	Race													Net points	Final rank
Athlete	Event	1	2	3	4	5	6	7	8	9	10	11	12	M*	Net points	Final rank
Sam Meech	Laser	~~19~~	19	8	16	14	3	2	13	11	3	—N/a		20	109	10
Josh Junior	Finn	~~12~~	10	3	7	8	5	1	4	8	1	—N/a		16	63	5
Paul Snow-Hansen; Daniel Willcox	470	6	2	7	1	5	7	~~13~~	8	6	3	—N/a		6	57	4
Peter Burling; Blair Tuke	49er	~~12~~	3	7	2	10	1	3	6	2	5	2	11	6	58	2nd place, silver medalist(s)

Women

Athlete	Event	Race													Net points	Final rank
Athlete	Event	1	2	3	4	5	6	7	8	9	10	11	12	M*	Net points	Final rank
Alex Maloney; Molly Meech	49er FX	16	~~22~~	5	12	4	4	8	3	18	6	20	6	EL	102	12

Mixed

Athlete	Event	Race													Net points	Final rank
Athlete	Event	1	2	3	4	5	6	7	8	9	10	11	12	M*	Net points	Final rank
Micah Wilkinson; Erica Dawson	Nacra 17	11	12	13	11	8	12	15	9	~~18~~	17	8	14	EL	130	12

M* = Medal race (double points); EL = Eliminated – did not advance into the medal race

== Shooting ==
New Zealand shooters achieved quota places for the following events by virtue of their best finishes at the 2018 ISSF World Championships, the 2019 ISSF World Cup series, and Oceania Championships, as long as they obtained a minimum qualifying score (MQS) by 31 May 2020.

Rio 2016 Olympians Chloe Tipple (women's skeet) and silver medalist Natalie Rooney were officially selected to the New Zealand team before the Games postponed on 24 March 2020.

Athlete	Event	Qualification		Final	
Athlete	Event	Points	Rank	Points	Rank
Natalie Rooney	Women's trap	117	10	Did not advance	
Chloe Tipple	Women's skeet	108	27	Did not advance	

== Surfing ==
New Zealand sent two surfers (one man and one woman) to compete in their respective shortboard race. Billy Stairmand and Ella Williams secured a qualification slot each for their NOC, as the highest-ranked and last remaining surfers from Oceania, at the 2019 ISA World Surfing Games in Miyazaki, Japan.

Athlete	Event	Round 1		Round 2		Round 3	Quarterfinal	Semifinal	Final / BM	
Athlete	Event	Points	Rank	Points	Rank	Opposition Result	Opposition Result	Opposition Result	Opposition Result	Rank
Billy Stairmand	Men's shortboard	9.97	3 q	11.34	3 Q	Ferreira (BRA); L 9.67–14.54	Did not advance			
Ella Williams	Women's shortboard	9.70	2 Q	Bye		Hennessy (CRC); L 7.73–12.00	Did not advance			

== Swimming ==
New Zealand swimmers further achieved qualifying standards in the following events (up to a maximum of 2 swimmers in each event at the Olympic Qualifying Time (OQT), and potentially 1 at the Olympic Selection Time (OST)): To assure their selection to the Olympic team, swimmers must attain an Olympic qualifying cut in each individual pool event at any FINA-sanctioned meet between March 2019 and 21 May 2021. The team was announced on 16 June 2021.

Athlete	Event	Heat		Semifinal		Final	
Athlete	Event	Time	Rank	Time	Rank	Time	Rank
Lewis Clareburt	Men's 200 m individual medley	1:57.27 NR	3 Q	1:57.55	7 Q	1:57.70	8
Lewis Clareburt	Men's 400 m individual medley	4:09.49 NR	2 Q	—N/a		4:11.22	7
Zac Reid	Men's 400 m freestyle	3:49.85	23	—N/a		Did not advance	
Zac Reid	Men's 800 m freestyle	7:53.06 NR	18	—N/a		Did not advance	
Erika Fairweather	Women's 200 m freestyle	1:57.26	14 Q	1:59.14	16	Did not advance	
Erika Fairweather	Women's 400 m freestyle	4:02.28 NR	4 Q	—N/a		4:08.01	8
Ali Galyer	Women's 100 m backstroke	1:02.65	33	Did not advance			
Ali Galyer	Women's 200 m backstroke	2:15.16	24	Did not advance			
Hayley McIntosh	Women's 1500 m freestyle	16:44.43	31	—N/a		Did not advance	
Eve Thomas	Women's 800 m freestyle	8:32.51	18	—N/a		Did not advance	
Eve Thomas	Women's 1500 m freestyle	16:29.66	26	—N/a		Did not advance	
Carina Doyle; Erika Fairweather; Ali Galyer; Eve Thomas	Women's 4 × 200 m freestyle relay	8:06.16	12	—N/a		Did not advance	

== Taekwondo ==
New Zealand entered one athlete into the taekwondo competition at the Games. Tom Burns secured a spot in the men's lightweight category (68 kg) with a gold-medal triumph at the 2020 Oceania Qualification Tournament in Gold Coast, Queensland, Australia.

Athlete	Event	Round of 16	Quarterfinals	Semifinals	Repechage	Final / BM	
Athlete	Event	Opposition Result	Opposition Result	Opposition Result	Opposition Result	Opposition Result	Rank
Tom Burns	Men's −68 kg	Sinden (GBR); L 8–53 PTG	Did not advance		Reçber (TUR); L 8–23	Did not advance	7

== Tennis ==
On 23 June 2021, Tennis New Zealand announced that Marcus Daniell and Michael Venus would represent New Zealand in men's doubles for the second consecutive Olympic Games.

Athlete	Event	Round of 32	Round of 16	Quarterfinals	Semifinals	Final / BM	
Athlete	Event	Opposition Score	Opposition Score	Opposition Score	Opposition Score	Opposition Score	Rank
Marcus Daniell; Michael Venus	Men's doubles	Gerasimov / Ivashka (BLR); W 6–3, 7–6	Koolhof / Rojer (NED); W WO	Cabal / Farah (COL); W 6–3, 3–6, [10–7]	Čilić / Dodig (CRO); L 2–6, 2–6	Krajicek / Sandgren (USA); W 7–6, 6–2	3rd place, bronze medalist(s)

== Triathlon ==
New Zealand qualified four triathletes (two per gender) for the following events at the Games by finishing among the top seven nations in the ITU Mixed Relay Olympic Rankings.

Individual

Athlete	Event	Time						Rank
Athlete	Event	Swim (1.5 km)	Trans 1	Bike (40 km)	Trans 2	Run (10 km)	Total	Rank
Tayler Reid	Men's	17:45	0:37	56:40	0:27	31:25	1:46:54	18
Hayden Wilde	Men's	18:17	0:39	56:07	0:29	29:52	1:45:24	3rd place, bronze medalist(s)
Ainsley Thorpe	Women's	19:15	0:43	Did not finish				
Nicole van der Kaay	Women's	19:35	0:42	1:05:02	0:33	37:34	2:03:26	29

Relay

Athlete	Event	Time						Rank
Athlete	Event	Swim (300 m)	Trans 1	Bike (7 km)	Trans 2	Run (2 km)	Total group	Rank
Tayler Reid	Mixed relay	3:56	0:36	9:49	0:28	5:49	20:38	—N/a
Hayden Wilde	Mixed relay	4:21	0:35	9:29	0:29	5:41	20:35	—N/a
Ainsley Thorpe	Mixed relay	3:51	0:41	10:33	0:31	7:06	22:42	—N/a
Nicole van der Kaay	Mixed relay	4:39	0:41	10:47	0:31	6:20	22:58	—N/a
Total	Mixed relay	—N/a					1:26:53	12

== Weightlifting ==
New Zealand entered five weightlifters (two men and three women) into the Olympic competition. Laurel Hubbard, who made history as the first openly transgender weightlifter to compete at the Games, finished seventh of the eight entrants in the women's +87 kg category based on the IWF Absolute World Rankings, with Cameron McTaggart (men's 81 kg), David Liti (men's +109 kg), Megan Signal (women's 76 kg), and Kanah Andrews-Nahu (women's 87 kg) topping the field of weightlifters vying for qualification from Oceania based on the IWF Absolute Continental Rankings. Megan Signal withdrew due to injury shortly before her competition began.

Athlete	Event	Snatch		Clean & jerk		Total	Rank
Athlete	Event	Result	Rank	Result	Rank	Total	Rank
Cameron McTaggart	Men's −81 kg	140	12	175	11	315	11
David Liti	Men's +109 kg	178	9	236	3	414	5
Kanah Andrews-Nahu	Women's −87 kg	94	13	112	13	206	13
Laurel Hubbard	Women's +87 kg	~~125~~	DNF	—	—	—	DNF

== Sports that declined qualification allocations ==
=== Archery ===
New Zealand had last competed in archery at the 2004 Athens Olympics. The country qualified one male and one female archer at the 2019 Pacific Games in Apia, Samoa, through Olivia Hodgson and Adam Kaluzny beating their Australian competitors. To gain nomination at the Olympics, athletes need to be put forward by Archery New Zealand (ANZ) to the New Zealand Olympic Committee, but the organisation argued that no New Zealand archers had met their criteria. Two female archers, Hodgson and Olivia Sloan, separately appealed to the Sports Tribunal to have ANZ's decision overturned. The tribunal, made up by chair Bruce Robertson, Robbie Hart and Pippa Hayward, upheld ANZ's decision in June 2021.

=== Artistic swimming ===
New Zealand qualified for a squad of two artistic swimmers to compete in the women's duet event, by securing an outright berth as the next highest-ranked pair, not yet qualified, for Oceania at the 2019 FINA World Championships in Gwangju, South Korea, marking the country's recurrence to the sport for the first time since Beijing 2008. Artistic Swimming NZ subsequently declined to take up the spot, and its place will be reassigned to another country by FINA (the International Swimming Federation).

=== Badminton ===
Oceania qualified for one player in the Olympics and the seat was allocated to New Zealand. Indian-born Abhinav Manota was New Zealand's choice for the men's singles as the country's top-ranked badminton player. When the New Zealand Olympic Committee declined the position, the Oceania qualification could not be reassigned within the region, but the seat was instead allocated to the highest-ranked player who had not qualified yet: the Hungarian Gergely Krausz.

=== Modern pentathlon ===
New Zealand qualified one modern pentathlete for the women's event, signifying the country's return to the sport after four decades. Rebecca Jamieson secured her selection as Oceania's top-ranked modern pentathlete at the 2019 Asia & Oceania Championships in Kunming, China. Marina Carrier of Australia came in second and thus did not qualify.

In February 2020, New Zealand declined its quota spot. This retrospectively qualified Carrier for the Olympics instead.

== See also ==
- New Zealand at the 2020 Summer Paralympics
