= Rowing at the 2020 Summer Olympics =

Rowing at the Games of the XXXII Olympiad
- Rowing pictogram for the 2020 Summer Olympics
- Venue: Sea Forest Waterway
- Dates: 23–30 July 2021
- No. of events: 14
- Competitors: 526 from 79 nations

The rowing competitions at the 2020 Summer Olympics in Tokyo took place between 23 and 30 July 2021 at the Sea Forest Waterway (Central Breakwater) in Tokyo Bay. Fourteen medal events were contested by 526 athletes (266 men and 260 women --- three of the seven coxes in the women's eights were male).

== Competition format ==
The rowing programme featured a total of fourteen events, seven each for both men and women in identical boat classes. This gender equality was suggested by the World Rowing Federation at its February 2017 congress, with the recommendation adopted by the International Olympic Committee in June 2017. This balancing was achieved by deleting the men's lightweight four and adding the women's coxless four boat classes. The women's coxless four previously ran at the 1992 Barcelona Olympics; the only time this boat class was an Olympic event. The changes to the Olympic rowing schedule were the first since the 1996 Atlanta Olympics.

Events for the 2020 Tokyo Olympics included both disciplines of rowing: sweep rowing, where competitors each use a single oar, and sculling, where they use two placed on opposite sides of the boat. There was also one lightweight (weight restricted) event for each gender: the lightweight double sculls. Sculling events include men's and women's singles, doubles, lightweight doubles, and quads. Sweep events included men's and women's coxless pairs, coxless fours, and eights.

== Regatta venue ==
The event took at the Sea Forest Waterway, a new venue constructed specifically for the 2020 Summer Olympic Games and Paralympic Games. The water is about 6 metres deep. The course is 2335 meters long and 198 meters wide. Each lane is 12.5 m wide. There were 8 lanes.

== Qualification ==
A total of 526 quota spots were available. Each qualified nation entered one boat for each of the fourteen events. The majority of the berths were awarded based on the results at the 2019 World Rowing Championships, held in Ottensheim, Austria from 25 August to 1 September 2019. Places were awarded to National Olympic Committees, not to specific athletes, finishing in the top 9 in the single sculls (both men and women), top 5 in the eights, top 8 in the fours and quadruple sculls, top 7 in the lightweight double sculls, and top 11 each in the pairs and double sculls. Further berths were distributed to the nations (and in this case to specific competitors) at four continental qualifying regattas in Asia and Oceania, Africa, Latin America, and Europe, and at a final Olympic qualification regatta in Lucerne, Switzerland.

== Competition schedule ==
Legend
H	Heats	R	Repechage	¼	Quarter-finals	½	Semi-finals	F	Final

Men's and women's races held on the same days
Event↓/Date →	Fri 23	Sat 24	Sun 25	Mon 26	Tue 27	Wed 28	Thu 29	Fri 30
Men's single sculls Women's single sculls	H	R	¼/½				½	F
Men's pair Women's pair		H	R			½	F	
Men's double sculls Women's double sculls	H	R	½			F		
Men's lightweight double sculls Women's lightweight double sculls		H	R			½	F	
Men's four Women's four		H	R			F		
Men's quadruple sculls Women's quadruple sculls	H		R			F		
Men's eight Women's eight		H				R		F

On 23 July, World Rowing announced changes to the schedule due to forecasted inclement weather for 26 July. All racing originally scheduled for 26 July was moved to 25 July. The eights heats were also moved from 25 to 24 July to accommodate the new schedule. Further revisions were made on 25 July, cancelling racing on 27 July due to Tropical Storm Nepartak hitting parts of Japan.

== Participation ==
=== Events by number of boats entered ===
Each event has the same number of boats entered for men and women.

Event	Number of boats per gender
Single sculls	32
Pair	13
Double sculls	13
Lightweight double sculls	18
Coxless four	10
Quadruple sculls	10
Eight	7

=== Participating nations (number of rowers) ===
- Algeria (2)
- Argentina (2)
- Australia (40)
- Austria (3)
- Belarus (5)
- Belgium (2)
- Benin (1)
- Bermuda (1)
- Brazil (1)
- Canada (29)
- Chile (2)
- China (28)
- Ivory Coast (1)
- Croatia (3)
- Cuba (1)
- Czech Republic (7)
- Denmark (9)
- Dominican Republic (1)
- Egypt (1)
- Estonia (4)
- France (12)
- Germany (24)
- Great Britain (41)
- Greece (4)
- Guatemala (2)
- Hong Kong (1)
- Hungary (1)
- India (2)
- Indonesia (2)
- Iran (1)
- Iraq (1)
- Ireland (13)
- Italy (23)
- Japan (3)
- Kazakhstan (1)
- Kuwait (1)
- Libya (1)
- Lithuania (9)
- Mexico (1)
- Monaco (1)
- Morocco (1)
- Namibia (1)
- Netherlands (35)
- New Zealand (32)
- Nicaragua (2)
- Nigeria (1)
- Norway (7)
- Paraguay (1)
- Peru (1)
- Philippines (1)
- Poland (20)
- Portugal (2)
- Puerto Rico (1)
- Qatar (1)
- Romania (36)
- ROC (10)
- Saudi Arabia (1)
- Serbia (3)
- Singapore (1)
- South Africa (6)
- South Korea (1)
- Spain (6)
- Sudan (1)
- Sweden (1)
- Switzerland (9)
- Chinese Taipei (1)
- Thailand (2)
- Togo (1)
- Trinidad and Tobago (1)
- Tunisia (2)
- Turkey (1)
- Uganda (1)
- Ukraine (2)
- United States (37)
- Uruguay (2)
- Uzbekistan (2)
- Vanuatu (1)
- Venezuela (2)
- Vietnam (2)
- Zimbabwe (1)

== Medalists ==
=== Medal table ===
Rank	NOC	Gold	Silver	Bronze	Total
1	New Zealand	3	2	0	5
2	Australia	2	0	2	4
3	Netherlands	1	2	2	5
4	Romania	1	2	0	3
5	France	1	1	0	2
6	China	1	0	2	3
6	Italy	1	0	2	3
8	Canada	1	0	1	2
8	Croatia	1	0	1	2
8	Ireland	1	0	1	2
11	Greece	1	0	0	1
12	Germany	0	2	0	2
12	ROC	0	2	0	2
14	Great Britain	0	1	1	2
15	Norway	0	1	0	1
15	Poland	0	1	0	1
17	Austria	0	0	1	1
17	Denmark	0	0	1	1
Totals (18 entries)		14	14	14	42

=== Men’s ===
Games	Gold	Silver	Bronze
Single sculls	Stefanos Ntouskos; Greece	Kjetil Borch; Norway	Damir Martin; Croatia
Double sculls	France; Hugo Boucheron; Matthieu Androdias	Netherlands; Melvin Twellaar; Stef Broenink	China; Liu Zhiyu; Zhang Liang
Quadruple sculls	Netherlands; Dirk Uittenbogaard; Abe Wiersma; Tone Wieten; Koen Metsemakers	Great Britain; Harry Leask; Angus Groom; Tom Barras; Jack Beaumont	Australia; Jack Cleary; Caleb Antill; Cameron Girdlestone; Luke Letcher
Coxless pair	Croatia; Martin Sinković; Valent Sinković	Romania; Marius Cozmiuc; Ciprian Tudosă	Denmark; Frederic Vystavel; Joachim Sutton
Coxless four	Australia; Alexander Purnell; Spencer Turrin; Jack Hargreaves; Alexander Hill	Romania; Mihăiță Țigănescu; Mugurel Semciuc; Ștefan Berariu; Cosmin Pascari	Italy; Matteo Castaldo; Marco Di Costanzo; Matteo Lodo; Giuseppe Vicino; Bruno Rosetti (Note: A few hours before the A final Rosetti tested positive to Covid-2019 and was replaced by Di Costanzo. As he had rowed in the heat, he was eligible for a medal.)
Coxed eight	New Zealand; Tom Mackintosh; Hamish Bond; Tom Murray; Michael Brake; Dan Williamson; Phillip Wilson; Shaun Kirkham; Matt Macdonald; Sam Bosworth c	Germany; Johannes Weißenfeld; Laurits Follert; Olaf Roggensack; Torben Johannesen; Jakob Schneider; Malte Jakschik; Richard Schmidt; Hannes Ocik; Martin Sauer c	Great Britain; Josh Bugajski; Jacob Dawson; Thomas George; Moe Sbihi; Charles Elwes; Oliver Wynne-Griffith; James Rudkin; Thomas Ford; Henry Fieldman c
Lightweight double sculls	Ireland; Fintan McCarthy; Paul O'Donovan	Germany; Jonathan Rommelmann; Jason Osborne	Italy; Stefano Oppo; Pietro Ruta

=== Women’s ===
Games	Gold	Silver	Bronze
Single sculls	Emma Twigg; New Zealand	Hanna Prakatsen; ROC	Magdalena Lobnig; Austria
Double sculls	Romania; Nicoleta-Ancuța Bodnar; Simona Radiș	New Zealand; Brooke Donoghue; Hannah Osborne	Netherlands; Roos de Jong; Lisa Scheenaard
Quadruple sculls	China; Chen Yunxia; Zhang Ling; Lü Yang; Cui Xiaotong	Poland; Agnieszka Kobus; Marta Wieliczko; Maria Sajdak; Katarzyna Zillmann	Australia; Ria Thompson; Rowena Meredith; Harriet Hudson; Caitlin Cronin
Coxless pair	New Zealand; Grace Prendergast; Kerri Gowler	ROC; Vasilisa Stepanova; Elena Oriabinskaia	Canada; Caileigh Filmer; Hillary Janssens
Coxless four	Australia; Lucy Stephan; Rosemary Popa; Jessica Morrison; Annabelle McIntyre	Netherlands; Ellen Hogerwerf; Karolien Florijn; Ymkje Clevering; Veronique Meester	Ireland; Aifric Keogh; Eimear Lambe; Fiona Murtagh; Emily Hegarty
Coxed eight	Canada; Susanne Grainger; Kasia Gruchalla-Wesierski; Madison Mailey; Sydney Payne; Andrea Proske; Lisa Roman; Christine Roper; Avalon Wasteneys; Kristen Kit c	New Zealand; Ella Greenslade; Emma Dyke; Lucy Spoors; Kelsey Bevan; Grace Prendergast; Kerri Gowler; Beth Ross; Jackie Gowler; Caleb Shepherd c	China; Guo Linlin; Ju Rui; Li Jingjing; Miao Tian; Wang Zifeng; Wang Yuwei; Xu Fei; Zhang Min; Zhang Dechang c
Lightweight double sculls	Italy; Valentina Rodini; Federica Cesarini	France; Laura Tarantola; Claire Bové	Netherlands; Marieke Keijser; Ilse Paulis

== Records ==
Event	Round	Name	Nation	Time	Date	Record
Men's double sculls	Heats	Melvin Twellaar; Stef Broenink	Netherlands	6:08.38	24 July	~~OR~~
Women's coxless four	Heats	Lucy Stephan; Rosemary Popa; Jessica Morrison; Annabelle McIntyre	Australia	6:28.76	24 July	~~OR~~ (Note: The Australian women's coxless four rowing team broke the Olympic record for the coxless four event in the Final four days later.)
Women's double sculls	Final	Nicoleta-Ancuța Bodnar; Simona Radiș	Romania	6:41.03	28 July	OR
Men's double sculls	Final	Hugo Boucheron; Matthieu Androdias	France	6:00.33	28 July	OR
Women's coxless four	Final	Lucy Stephan; Rosemary Popa; Jessica Morrison; Annabelle McIntyre	Australia	6:15.37	28 July	OR
Men's coxless four	Final	Alexander Purnell; Spencer Turrin; Jack Hargreaves; Alexander Hill	Australia	5:42.76	28 July	OR
Men's quadruple sculls	Final	Dirk Uittenbogaard; Abe Wiersma; Tone Wieten; Koen Metsemakers	Netherlands	5:32.03	28 July	OR, WR
Women's quadruple sculls	Final	Chen Yunxia; Zhang Ling; Lü Yang; Cui Xiaotong	China	6:05.13	28 July	OR, WR
Men's lightweight double sculls	Semifinal	Fintan McCarthy; Paul O'Donovan	Ireland	6:05.33	28 July	OR, WR

== See also ==
- Rowing at the 2020 Summer Paralympics
