= Phoebe Spoors =

New Zealand rower (born 1993)

Personal information
- Born: 11 August 1993 (age 33) Christchurch, New Zealand
- Education: Christchurch Girls' High School; University of Washington
- Height: 185 cm (6 ft 1 in)
- Relative: Lucy Spoors (sister)

Sport
- Country: New Zealand
- Sport: Rowing
- Event: Eight
- Club: Canterbury Rowing Club
Medal record
Women's rowing
Representing New Zealand
Olympic Games
Bronze medal – third place	2024 Paris	Coxless four

Phoebe Spoors (born 11 August 1993) is a New Zealand rower. From Christchurch, she was an unused reserve in the New Zealand women's eight at the 2020 Tokyo Olympics in which her elder sister Lucy won a silver medal. In an unusual career progression for a New Zealand rower, she never represented the country as an age-group rower but joined the national team after several years in the United States for fulltime rowing at the University of Washington combined with tertiary study.

== Early life ==
Spoors was born in Christchurch in 1993. Lucy Spoors is her elder sister by three years. Both went to Christchurch Girls' High School where they also started rowing. Phoebe Spoors holds a degree in political science and communications obtained from the University of Washington.

== Career ==
At the February 2011 New Zealand national championships held at Lake Ruataniwha, she competed in two U19 boat classes starting for the Canterbury Rowing Club. She came first with the double scull and second with the coxed four.

At the February 2012 New Zealand national championships held at Lake Karapiro, she competed in five boat classes starting for the Avon Rowing Club; this was the year after she had finished high school. Three competitions were for club boats and she came first with the eight, second with the coxless quad scull, and fourth with the coxed four. The other two boat classes were senior women, where she came second in both the coxless quad scull and the eight.

In the 2012/13 season, she was a member of the Southern Rowing Performance Centre. At the February 2013 New Zealand national championships held at Lake Ruataniwha, she started in three age group boat classes and one premier (Note: Premier is the highest ability class in New Zealand and rowers can compete in this class once they have been accepted by one of the Regional Performance Centres (RPCs).) boat class. With the premier coxless four, she came third. With both the U20 coxless four and the U22 eight, she came first. With the U22 coxless pair she came fourth.

Spoors then moved to the United States to study at the University of Washington and to join her twin sister Grace on the university's rowing team. She finished her degree in 2017 and her first regatta back in New Zealand was the Karapiro Club Regatta in December 2017; her twin sister has since retired from rowing.

At the February 2018 New Zealand national championships held at Lake Karapiro, she competed in two premier boat classes rowing for the Regional Performance Centre South and she won her first premier national title. With the eight, she came second. With the coxless four, she became national champion alongside Emma Dyke, Grace Prendergast, and her elder sister Lucy. Her performance at the nationals impressed the selectors of Rowing New Zealand and she made the national team, being placed in the coxless four alongside Kirstyn Goodger, Ruby Tew, and Elizabeth Jeurissen. Then aged 24, Spoors had therefore skipped international rowing for her country in age groups (junior or U23), which is unusual in New Zealand. At the 2018 World Rowing Cup II in Linz-Ottensheim, Austria, they came eleventh. At the 2018 World Rowing Cup III held on the Rotsee in Switzerland, where Georgia Perry replaced Goodger, they came eighth. At the 2018 World Rowing Championships in Plovdiv, Bulgaria, her team came ninth.

At the February 2019 New Zealand national championships held at Lake Ruataniwha, she competed in three premier boat classes and gained two national titles. With the coxless pair, she came second teamed up with Davina Waddy. With the coxless four and the eight, she won national championships. She was again invited to join the sweep squad and was joined by Davina Waddy, Kelsi Walters, and Eve Macfarlane in the coxless four. They went to the 2019 World Rowing Cups II (Poznań, Poland) and III (Rotterdam, Netherlands), where the team came eights and twelves, respectively. At the 2019 World Rowing Championships in Linz-Ottensheim, Austria, they came eleventh. The 2019 World Rowing Championships were a qualification event for the 2020 Tokyo Olympics and as the first eight boats qualified, New Zealand missed out in this boat class.

At the 2020 New Zealand rowing nationals at Lake Karapiro, Spoors competed in the coxless four and won the national title. Due to the COVID-19 pandemic, there was no international rowing during 2020.

In early February 2021, Rowing New Zealand announced the elite women's team for the Olympic year, with Spoors placed in the sweep squad. Two weeks later at the 2021 New Zealand rowing nationals at Lake Ruataniwha, Spoors competed in three boat classes. In the squad scull, she came sixth. In the eight, she came third. In the coxless four, she lost her national title and came second. When New Zealand's Olympic team was announced in June 2021, Spoors was listed as one of ten rowers designated for the women's eight. The seats were confirmed on 9 July 2021, with both Spoors sisters as part of the team. However, Grace Prendergast and Kerri Gowler did double-duty in the women's pair and the eight, with Kirstyn Goodger and Phoebe Spoors remaining unused reserve rowers.

=== National titles ===
National titles for senior rowers are known as Red Coats in New Zealand. As of 2021, Spoors has won four premier Red Coats.

Red Coats – New Zealand premier national titles
Coxless four	2018, 2019, 2020
Eight	2019
