= 2017 World Rowing Championships – Women's eight =

Women's eight at the 2017 World Rowing Championships
- Venue: Nathan Benderson Park
- Location: Sarasota, United States
- Dates: 26 September – 1 October
- Competitors: 72 from 8 nations
- Winning time: 6:06.40

Medalists
gold medal	Ioana Vrînceanu; Viviana-Iuliana Bejinariu; Mihaela Petrilă; Iuliana Popa; Mădălina Bereș; Denisa Tîlvescu; Adelina Bogus; Laura Oprea; Daniela Druncea	Romania
silver medal	Lisa Roman; Kristin Bauder; Nicole Hare; Hillary Janssens; Christine Roper; Susanne Grainger; Jennifer Martins; Rebecca Zimmerman; Kristen Kit	Canada
bronze medal	Ashlee Rowe; Ruby Tew; Georgia Perry; Kelsey Bevan; Kelsi Walters; Rebecca Scown; Lucy Spoors; Emma Dyke; Sam Bosworth	New Zealand

The women's eight competition at the 2017 World Rowing Championships in Sarasota took place in Nathan Benderson Park.

== Schedule ==
The schedule was as follows:

Date	Time	Round
Tuesday 26 September 2017	13:25	Heats
Thursday 28 September 2017	12:51	Repechage
Sunday 1 October 2017	09:10	Final B
Sunday 1 October 2017	11:42	Final A

All times are Eastern Daylight Time (UTC-4)

== Results ==
=== Heats ===
Heat winners advanced directly to the A final. The remaining boats were sent to the repechage.

==== Heat 1 ====
Rank	Rowers	Country	Time	Notes
1	Rowe, Tew, Perry, Bevan, Walters, Scown, Spoors, Dyke, Bosworth	New Zealand	6:08.42	FA
2	Wheeler, Regan, Pierce, Schmetterling, Vitas, Schoeller, Latz, Dougherty, Guregian	United States	6:09.41	R
3	Chitty, Chin, Gammond, Norton, Wratten, Douglas, Bennett, Shorten, Horn	Great Britain	6:15.10	R
4	Kalinovskaya, Glazkova, Sevostianova, Kubyshkina, Zaruba, Karpova, Aksenova, Plaksina, Krylova	Russia	6:30.36	R

==== Heat 2 ====
Rank	Rowers	Country	Time	Notes
1	Vrînceanu, Bejinariu, Petrilă, Popa, Bereș, Tîlvescu, Bogus, Oprea, Druncea	Romania	6:07.32	FA
2	Roman, Bauder, Hare, Janssens, Roper, Grainger, Martins, Zimmerman, Kit	Canada	6:09.69	R
3	Wielaard, Lanz, Jorritsma, van Veen, Rustenburg, Florijn, Clevering, Meester, Noort	Netherlands	6:12.40	R
4	Ku, Xie, Sun, Tang, Zhang, Fu, Hunagfu, Yang, Zhu	China	6:32.84	R

=== Repechage ===
The four fastest boats advanced to the A final. The remaining boats were sent to the B final.

Rank	Rowers	Country	Time	Notes
1	Roman, Bauder, Hare, Janssens, Roper, Grainger, Martins, Zimmerman, Kit	Canada	6:11.32	FA
2	Wheeler, Regan, Pierce, Schmetterling, Vitas, Schoeller, Latz, Dougherty, Guregian	United States	6:11.83	FA
3	Chitty, Chin, Gammond, Norton, Wratten, Douglas, Bennett, Shorten, Horn	Great Britain	6:17.78	FA
4	Wielaard, Lanz, Jorritsma, van Veen, Rustenburg, Florijn, Clevering, Meester, Noort	Netherlands	6:20.49	FA
5	Kalinovskaya, Glazkova, Sevostianova, Kubyshkina, Zaruba, Karpova, Aksenova, Plaksina, Krylova	Russia	6:28.80	FB
6	Ku, Xie, Sun, Tang, Zhang, Fu, Hunagfu, Yang, Zhu	China	6:38.16	FB

=== Finals ===
The A final determined the rankings for places 1 to 6. Additional rankings were determined in the B final.

==== Final B ====
Rank	Rowers	Country	Time
1	Kalinovskaya, Glazkova, Sevostianova, Kubyshkina, Zaruba, Karpova, Aksenova, Plaksina, Krylova	Russia	6:30.54
2	Ku, Xie, Sun, Tang, Zhang, Fu, Hunagfu, Yang, Zhu	China	6:38.17

==== Final A ====
Rank	Rowers	Country	Time
1st place, gold medalist(s)	Vrînceanu, Bejinariu, Petrilă, Popa, Bereș, Tîlvescu, Bogus, Oprea, Druncea	Romania	6:06.40
2nd place, silver medalist(s)	Roman, Bauder, Hare, Janssens, Roper, Grainger, Martins, Zimmerman, Kit	Canada	6:07.09
3rd place, bronze medalist(s)	Rowe, Tew, Perry, Bevan, Walters, Scown, Spoors, Dyke, Bosworth	New Zealand	6:07.27
4	Wheeler, Regan, Pierce, Schmetterling, Vitas, Schoeller, Latz, Dougherty, Guregian	United States	6:09.25
5	Chitty, Chin, Gammond, Norton, Wratten, Douglas, Bennett, Shorten, Horn	Great Britain	6:09.96
6	Wielaard, Lanz, Jorritsma, van Veen, Rustenburg, Florijn, Clevering, Meester, Noort	Netherlands	6:10.83
