= Rowing at the 2013 Canada Summer Games =

Rowing events

Rowing at the 2013 Canada Summer Games was in Sherbrooke, Quebec at Lake Magog. It was held from the 13 to 17 August. There were 14 events of rowing.

== Medal table ==
The following is the medal table for rowing at the 2013 Canada Summer Games.

| Rank | Province | Gold | Silver | Bronze | Total |
|---|---|---|---|---|---|
| 1 | British Columbia | 10 | 1 | 1 | 12 |
| 2 | Ontario | 2 | 9 | 2 | 13 |
| 3 | Alberta | 1 | 1 | 4 | 6 |
| 4 | New Brunswick | 1 | 1 | 1 | 3 |
| 5 | Saskatchewan | 0 | 2 | 1 | 3 |
| 6 | Quebec (Host) | 0 | 0 | 4 | 4 |
| 7 | Nova Scotia | 0 | 0 | 1 | 1 |
| 8 | Manitoba Newfoundland & Labrador Prince Edward Island | 0 | 0 | 0 | 0 |

== Rowing ==
| Event | Gold | | Silver | | Bronze | |
|---|---|---|---|---|---|---|
| Single scull | New Brunswick | Taylor Perry | Ontario | Matthew Christie | Nova Scotia | Will Bryden |
| Double scull | Ontario | Dan de Groot; Andre Pelletier | New Brunswick | Taylor Perry; Jack Summerhayes | British Columbia | Mark Davies; Connor McSweeney |
| Quadruple scull | Ontario | Dan de Groot; James Myers; Andre Pelletier; Nik Vantfoort | British Columbia | Brandon Carnduff; Mark Davies; Sean Decter; Connor McSweeney | Alberta | Quinn Brandly; Doug Doyle-Baker; Jack Dundas; Stephen Holloway |
| Pairs | British Columbia | Cameron Howie; Maxwell Lattimer | Ontario | Samuel Frum; Grayson Gray | Quebec | Hubert Blouin; Jean-Francois Taillon |
| Fours | British Columbia | Martin Barasko; Lucas deGelder; Sam Harris; Colin Schaap | Ontario | Lance Brazeau; Matthew Finley; Aaron Kirkey; Scott Macdonald | Quebec | Hubert Blouin; David Cabana; Daniel Lone; Jean-Francois Taillon |
| Lightweight fours | British Columbia | Cameron Howie; Aaron Lattimer; Maxwell Lattimer; Angus Todd | Ontario | Lucas Farewell; Samuel Frum; Grayson Gray; Kieran Tierney | Alberta | Sam Garber; Sam Hogman; William Kennedy; James Kirker |
| Eights | British Columbia | Cameron Howie; Aaron Lattimer; Maxwell Lattimer; Angus Todd; Martin Barasko; Lucas deGelder; Sam Harris; Colin Schaap | Ontario | Lance Brazeau; David de Groot; Lucas Farewell; Matthew Finley; Aaron Kirkey; Scott Macdonald; James Myers; Nik Vantfoort | New Brunswick | Joe Chamberlain; Andrew Johnston; Andrew McGillicuddy; Cole Northrup; Taylor Perry; Jack Smith; Jack Summerhayes; Nick Voutour |

=== Women's ===
| Event | Gold | | Silver | | Bronze | |
|---|---|---|---|---|---|---|
| Single scull | Alberta | Nicole Hare | Ontario | Erin Snelgrove | Quebec | Emma Durham |
| Double scull | British Columbia | Ellen Gleadow; Kate Gleadow | Ontario | Lakin Davenport Huyer; Erin Snelgrove | Alberta | Nicole Hare; Karen Guran |
| Quadruple scull | British Columbia | Ellen Gleadow; Kate Gleadow; Emily Lerhe; Deborah Snell | Alberta | Nicole Hare; Karen Guran; Isabelle Belzil; McKenzie Lukacs | Ontario | Danielle Abusow; Larkin Davenport Huyer; Jill Moffatt; Erin Snelgrove |
| Lightweight double sculls | British Columbia | Keira Flanagan; Deborah Snell | Ontario | Danielle Abusow; Jill Moffatt | Saskatchewan | Larissa Werbicki; Anna Currie |
| Pairs | British Columbia | Hilary Janssens; Kelly Jackson | Saskatchewan | Sierra Bronkhorst; Kendell Massier | Ontario | Sarah Rothwell; Aleda Kawalek |
| Fours | British Columbia | Mickey Aylard; Morgan Cathrea; Allie DeLarge; Kelly Jackson | Saskatchewan | Sierra Bronkhorst; Kendell Massier; Gillian Cattet; Lauren Ritchie | Alberta | Olivia McMurray; Mallory Turner; Morgan Crilly; Olivia Fischer |
| Eights | British Columbia | Mickey Aylard; Morgan Cathrea; Allie DeLarge; Zoe Fettig-Winn; Emily Gerson; Hilary Janssens; Jillian Legare; Jordan Watson; Erynn Pawluk | Ontario | Julie Calvert; Georgia Hamilton; Larkin Davenport Huyer; Aleda Kawalek; Catherine Multari; Sarah Rothwell; Elizabeth Turner; Shelby Stinnissen; Julia VanderHoeven | Quebec | Andreanne Cote; Beatrice Dagenais; Marilyse Dubois; Emma Durham; Chloe Edmond; Catherine Gravel; Florence Martin; Tessie Salatas; Gabrielle Smith |
