= Ashlee Rowe =

New Zealand rower

Personal information
- Born: 3 December 1992 (age 33)

Sport
- Sport: Rowing
Medal record
Women's rowing
Representing New Zealand
World Championships
Bronze medal – third place	2017 Sarasota	Eight

Ashlee Rowe (born 3 December 1992) is a New Zealand rower.

Rowe is originally from Perth in Western Australia, where she was a member of the Swan River Rowing Club. She used to train on the Canning River, a tributary to the Swan River. She took up rowing in 2008 aged 15 and was a member of the Western Australian U21 rowing team. Rowe competed at the New Zealand national championships in 2008 and rowed with the women's novice eight; they took out the championship that year.

Rowe relocated to New Zealand for better elite rowing opportunities. Based in Auckland, she is a member of the North Shore Rowing Club, and she trains at the Auckland Rowing Performance Centre (ARPC). At the 2012 New Zealand national championships, she won bronze with the women's senior coxless quad sculls, and bronze with the women's senior eight. At the 2014 nationals, she won silver with the women's U22 eight, and bronze with both the women's U22 coxless pair oars and the women's premier eight.

Rowe was accepted into New Zealand's U23 squad in 2014. At the 2014 World Rowing U23 Championships in Varese, Italy, Rowe was part of the U23 women's quadruple sculls team that won bronze. At the 2015 national championships, she won gold with the women's premier coxless four in a team with Kelsey Bevan, Christie Davis, and Kayla Pratt. During the 2015 season, she was a reserve for the national U23 quad and rowed at the two World Rowing Cups that were contested by New Zealand that year. In 2016, she was a reserve at the final Olympic Games Regatta in Rio de Janeiro, Brazil. At the 2016 nationals, she won a bronze with both the women's premier coxless four and the women's premier eight.

At the 2017 nationals, she won silver in the women's premier coxless four, and bronze in the women's premier eight. Rowe made the crew for New Zealand's women's eight in 2017. The team made history with their gold medal at the 2017 World Rowing Cup II, as it was the first time in elite rowing following a recent rule change that a male coxswain—Sam Bosworth—won with a female team. At the 2017 World Rowing Championships in Sarasota, Florida, she won a bronze medal with the New Zealand women's eight.
