= Jennifer Martins =

Canadian rower (born 1989)

Personal information
- Nationality: Canadian
- Born: January 31, 1989 (age 37) Toronto, Ontario
- Height: 180 cm (5 ft 11 in)
- Weight: 74 kg (163 lb)

Sport
- College team: Western Mustangs
Medal record
Women's rowing
Representing Canada
World Championships
Silver medal – second place	2017 Sarasota	Eight
Silver medal – second place	2018 Plovdiv	Eight
Bronze medal – third place	2013 Chungju	Eight
Bronze medal – third place	2015 Aiguebelette	Eight
World Rowing U23 Championships
Gold medal – first place	2011 Amsterdam	Eight

Jennifer Martins (born January 31, 1989) is a Canadian rower. In 2016, she was named to represent Canada at the 2016 Summer Olympics in the women's coxless pair with Nicole Hare. They finished in 14th place.

She represented Canada at the 2020 Summer Olympics.
