= Kirstyn =

Kirstyn is a feminine given name. Notable people with the name include:

- Kirstyn Goodger (born 1991), New Zealand rower
- Kirstyn McDermott (born 1973), Australian writer
- Victoria Kirstyn Williams (born 1971), Welsh politician and former Minister for Education
