= Rowing at the 2020 Summer Olympics – Women's eight =

Women's eight at the Games of the XXXII Olympiad
- Olympic rowing
- Venue: Sea Forest Waterway
- Dates: 24–30 July 2021
- Competitors: 63 from 7 nations
- Winning time: 5:59.13

Medalists
1st place, gold medalist(s)		Lisa Roman; Kasia Gruchalla-Wesierski; Christine Roper; Andrea Proske; Susanne Grainger; Madison Mailey; Sydney Payne; Avalon Wasteneys; Kristen Kit	Canada
2nd place, silver medalist(s)		Ella Greenslade; Emma Dyke; Lucy Spoors; Kelsey Bevan; Grace Prendergast; Kerri Gowler; Beth Ross; Jackie Gowler; Caleb Shepherd	New Zealand
3rd place, bronze medalist(s)		Wang Zifeng; Wang Yuwei; Xu Fei; Miao Tian; Zhang Min; Ju Rui; Li Jingjing; Guo Linlin; Zhang Dechang	China

The women's eight event at the 2020 Summer Olympics took place from 24 to 30 July 2021 at the Sea Forest Waterway. Seven nations were represented with one boat each; 56 rowers and 7 coxswains competed.

== Background ==
Women first competed in Olympic rowing at the 1976 Montreal Olympics and the eight was competed all Olympics since then, such that this was the twelfth appearance of the event.

== Qualification ==
Each National Olympic Committee (NOC) is limited to a single boat in the event. There were seven qualifying places in the women's eight:

- 5 from the 2019 World Championship (New Zealand, Australia, the United States, Canada, and Great Britain)
- 2 from the final qualification regatta (China and Romania)

== Schedule ==
The event was originally scheduled to start on 25 July 2021, but a poor weather forecast for 26 July resulted in a revised regatta programme, with the heats for the eight moving to the previous day. The competition was held over seven days.

All times are Japan Standard Time (UTC+9)

Date	Time	Round
Saturday, 24 July 2021	12:20	Heats
Wednesday, 28 July 2021	12:40	Repechage
Friday, 30 July 2021	10:50	Final

== Rowers per team ==
Number	Rowers	Nation
1	Genevieve Horton, Olympia Aldersey, Bronwyn Cox, Giorgia Patten, Sarah Hawe, Georgina Rowe, Katrina Werry, Molly Goodman, James Rook (c)	Australia
2	Lisa Roman, Kasia Gruchalla-Wesierski, Christine Roper, Andrea Proske, Susanne Grainger, Madison Mailey, Sydney Payne, Avalon Wasteneys, Kristen Kit (c)	Canada
3	Wang Zifeng, Wang Yuwei, Xu Fei, Miao Tian, Zhang Min, Ju Rui, Li Jingjing, Guo Linlin, Zhang Dechang (c)	China
4	Fiona Gammond, Sara Parfett, Emily Ford, Rebecca Muzerie, Caragh McMurtry, Katherine Douglas, Rebecca Edwards, Chloe Brew, Matilda Horn (c)	Great Britain
5	Ella Greenslade, Emma Dyke, Lucy Spoors, Kelsey Bevan, Grace Prendergast, Kerri Gowler, Beth Ross, Jackie Gowler, Caleb Shepherd (c)	New Zealand
6	Maria-Magdalena Rusu, Viviana-Iuliana Bejinariu, Georgiana Dedu, Maria Tivodariu, Ioana Vrînceanu, Amalia Bereș, Mădălina Bereș, Denisa Tîlvescu, Daniela Druncea (c)	Romania
7	Jessica Thoennes, Charlotte Buck, Gia Doonan, Brooke Mooney, Olivia Coffey, Regina Salmons, Meghan Musnicki, Kristine O'Brien, Katelin Guregian (c)	United States

== Results ==
=== Heats ===
==== Heat 1 ====
Rank	Lane	Nation	Time	Notes
1	3	New Zealand	6:07.65	Q
2	1	Canada	6:07.97	R
3	2	China	6:10.77	R
4	4	Great Britain	6:26.76	R

==== Heat 2 ====
Rank	Lane	Nation	Time	Notes
1	3	United States	6:08.69	Q
2	1	Romania	6:09.95	R
3	2	Australia	6:18.95	R

=== Repechage ===
Five nations qualify for the repechage; the top four qualify for the final.

Rank	Lane	Nation	Time	Notes
1	4	Romania	5:52.99	Q, WB
2	3	Canada	5:53.73	Q
3	2	China	5:55.69	Q
4	5	Australia	5:57.15	Q
5	1	Great Britain	6:05.26	

=== Final ===
Rank	Lane	Nation	Time	Notes
1st place, gold medalist(s)	2	Canada	5:59.13	
2nd place, silver medalist(s)	3	New Zealand	6:00.04	
3rd place, bronze medalist(s)	6	China	6:01.21	
4	4	United States	6:02.78	
5	1	Australia	6:03.92	
6	5	Romania	6:04.06	
