= Kelsi Walters =

New Zealand rower

Kelsi Walters-Hughes
Personal information
- Born: 13 April 1994 (age 32)
- Height: 186 cm (6 ft 1 in)
- Weight: 73 kg (161 lb)

Sport
- Sport: Rowing
Medal record
Women's rowing
Representing New Zealand
World Championships
Bronze medal – third place	2017 Sarasota	Eight

Kelsi Walters (born 13 April 1994) is a New Zealand rower.

== Private life ==
Walters was born in 1994. She received her education at Rosehill College, Papakura.

== Rowing career ==
Walters is a member of Counties Manukau Rowing Club where she started rowing in 2007. She first went to the Maadi Cup in 2009 when it was held on Lake Karapiro and won the girls u15 double sculls event. She did not achieve a medal placing at the 2010 Maadi Cup at Lake Ruataniwha or the 2011 Maadi Cup at Lake Karapiro. She first competed at the New Zealand national championships in February 2012, where she won a silver medal in the women's u19 double sculls, beaten by Hannah Duggan and Zoe McBride for the national title.

Walters had her first international appearance at the August 2012 World Rowing Junior Championships in Plovdiv, Bulgaria. With the junior women's four, she won bronze at the event. At the 2013 national championships, she won bronze in three age group events, and gold in the women's premier coxless four (with Kelsey Bevan, Abby Green, and Kayla Pratt). At the 2013 World Rowing U23 Championships in Linz, Austria, she won a bronze medal with the U23 women's four. At the 2014 national championships, she won bronze in two premier events, and silver and bronze in two age group events. At the 2014 World Rowing U23 Championships in Varese, Italy, she won a silver medal with the U23 women's four (alongside Johannah Kearney, Olivia Loe, and Emma Dyke).

Walters was not one of the trialists for the elite and U23 rowing team for 2015, but was back in 2016. At the 2016 nationals, she won silver in two age group events, and bronze with women's premier eight. At the 2016 World Rowing U23 Championships in Rotterdam, Netherlands, she came fourth with the U23 women's eight. She won a bronze medal with the New Zealand women's eight at the 2017 World Rowing Championships in Sarasota, Florida.
