= Denisa Tîlvescu =

Romanian rower

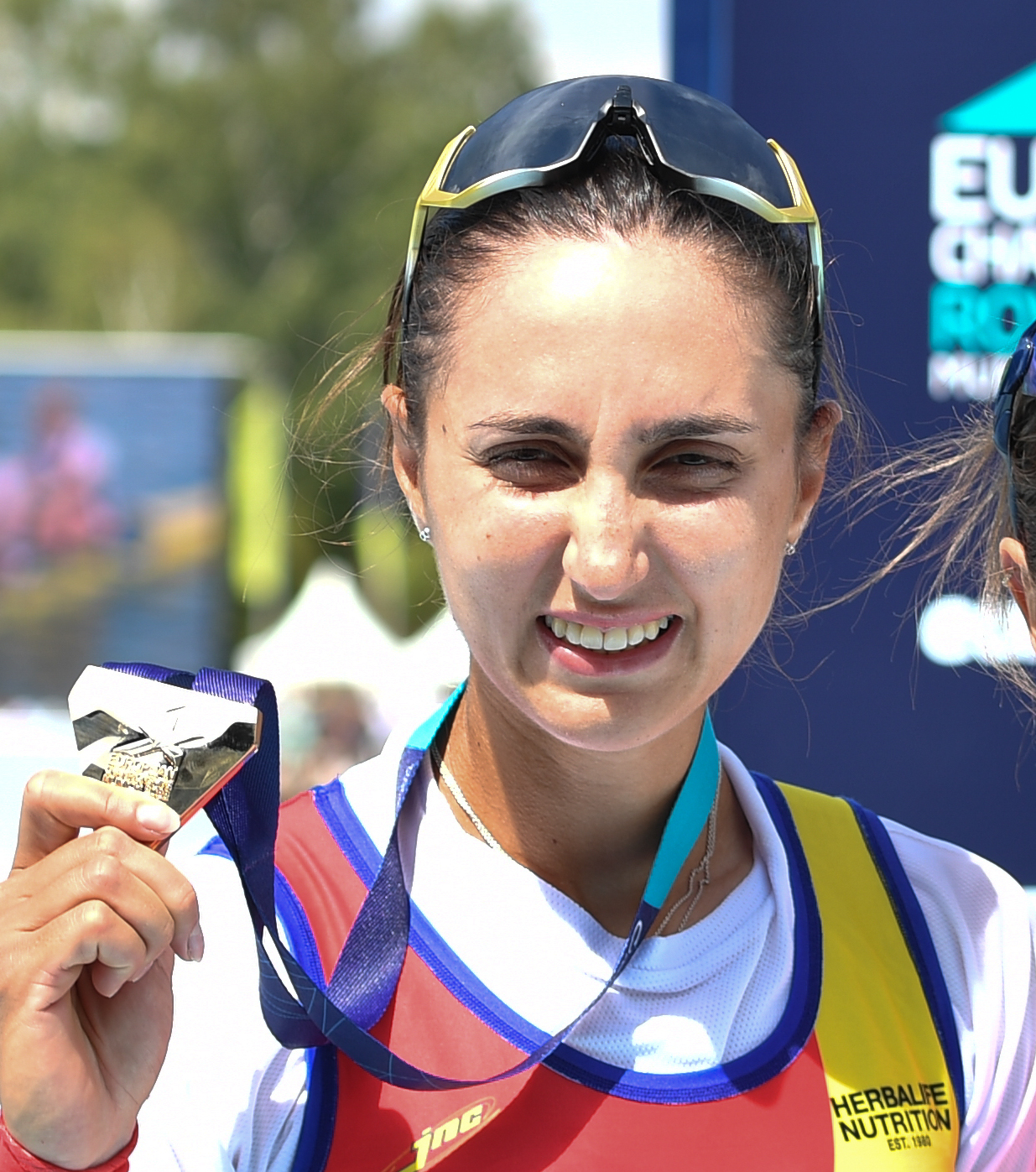
- Tîlvescu in 2022

Personal information
- Born: 13 August 1996 (age 30)
- Height: 182 cm (6 ft 0 in)

Sport
- Country: Romania
- Sport: Rowing
Medal record
Women's rowing
Representing Romania
World Championships
Gold medal – first place	2017 Sarasota	Eight
European Championships
Gold medal – first place	2017 Račice	Eight
Gold medal – first place	2018 Glasgow	Coxless pair
Gold medal – first place	2018 Glasgow	Eight
Gold medal – first place	2020 Poznań	Eight
Gold medal – first place	2021 Varese	Eight
Gold medal – first place	2022 Munich	Coxless pair
Silver medal – second place	2019 Lucerne	Coxless four
Bronze medal – third place	2015 Poznań	Eight

Denisa Tîlvescu (born 13 August 1996) is a Romanian rower. She won the gold medal in the women's eight event at the 2017 World Rowing Championships and is a six-time European champion, including four titles in eight and two titles in coxless pair. Tîlvescu competed in the women's eight event at the 2020 Summer Olympics.
