= Georgiana Dedu =

Romanian rower

Personal information
- Nationality: Romanian
- Born: 20 January 1996 (age 29)

Sport
- Sport: Rowing

Achievements and titles
- Olympic finals: Tokyo 2020 W8+

Georgiana Dedu (born 20 January 1996) is a Romanian rower. She competed in the women's eight event at the 2020 Summer Olympics.
