= Tom Tarver-Priebe =

New Zealand equestrian

Personal information
- Born: 31 July 1985 (age 39)

Sport
- Country: New Zealand
- Sport: Equestrian
- Event: Show jumping

Tom Tarver-Priebe (born 31 July 1985) is a New Zealand equestrian.

Tarver-Priebe, with his mount Popeye, was named as a travelling reserve in the New Zealand show jumping team for the delayed 2020 Summer Olympics, following the withdrawal of Sharn Wordley because of an injury to his horse. The day before the team competition, a further change was made with Tarver-Priebe and Popeye replacing Uma O'Neill and Clockwise Of Greenhill Z. In qualification, Tarver-Priebe and Popeye incurred 13 faults, and the New Zealand team as a whole 39 faults, and did not progress to the team final.

Of Māori descent, Tarver-Priebe affiliates to Ngāpuhi.
