= Li Jingjing (rower) =

Chinese rower

Personal information
- Nationality: Chinese
- Born: 15 June 1994 (age 32)

Sport
- Sport: Rowing
Medal record
Women's rowing
Representing China
Olympic Games
Bronze medal – third place	2020 Tokyo	Eight

Li Jingjing (born 15 June 1994) is a Chinese rower. She competed in the women's eight event at the 2020 Summer Olympics.
