= Viviana Iuliana Bejinariu =

Romanian rower

Viviana Bejinariu
Personal information
- Full name: Viviana Iuliana Bejinariu
- Born: 1 January 1994 (age 32) Siret, Suceava, Romania
- Height: 178 cm (5 ft 10 in)
- Weight: 72 kg (159 lb)

Sport
- Club: CS Dinamo Bucuresti
Medal record
Women's rowing
Representing Romania
World Championships
Gold medal – first place	2017 Sarasota	Eight
European Championships
Gold medal – first place	2017 Račice	Eight
Gold medal – first place	2018 Glasgow	Eight
Gold medal – first place	2020 Poznań	Eight
Gold medal – first place	2021 Varese	Eight
Silver medal – second place	2019 Lucerne	Coxless four

Viviana Iuliana Bejinariu (born 1 January 1994) is a Romanian rower. She was part of the team that won the gold medal in the women's eight competition at the 2017 World Rowing Championships in Sarasota, Florida.
