= Lisa Roman =

Canadian rower (born 1989)

Personal information
- Born: 17 September 1989 (age 36) Surrey, British Columbia, Canada
- Height: 178 cm (5 ft 10 in)
- Weight: 75 kg (165 lb)

Sport
- University team: Washington State University Cougars and UFV Cascades
Medal record
Women's rowing
Representing Canada
Olympic Games
Gold medal – first place	2020 Tokyo	Eight
World Championships
Silver medal – second place	2014 Amsterdam	Eight
Silver medal – second place	2017 Sarasota	Eight
Bronze medal – third place	2013 Chungju	Eight
Bronze medal – third place	2015 Aiguebelette	Eight

Lisa Roman (born 17 September 1989) is a Canadian rower. She was part of the team that won the silver medal in the Women's eight competition at the 2014 World Rowing Championships.

In June 2016, she was officially named to Canada's 2016 Olympic team as part of the Women's Eight team. The team finished in 5th place.

She represented Canada at the 2020 Summer Olympics. At the Olympics, Roman won the gold medal in the women's eights boat, Canada's first in the event since 1992.
