= Susanne Grainger =

Canadian rower (born 1990)

Personal information
- Born: 30 December 1990 (age 35) London, Ontario, Canada
- Height: 188 cm (6 ft 2 in)
- Weight: 80 kg (176 lb)

Sport
- University team: Virginia Cavaliers
Medal record
Women's rowing
Representing Canada
Olympic Games
| Gold medal – first place | 2020 Tokyo | Eight |
World Championships
| Silver medal – second place | 2014 Amsterdam | Eight |
| Silver medal – second place | 2017 Sarasota | Eight |
| Silver medal – second place | 2018 Plovdiv | Eight |
| Bronze medal – third place | 2013 Chungju | Eight |
| Bronze medal – third place | 2015 Aiguebelette | Eight |

Susanne Grainger (born 30 December 1990) is a Canadian rower. She was part of the team that won the silver medal in the Women's eight competition at the 2014 World Rowing Championships.

In June 2016, she was officially named to Canada's 2016 Olympic team.

She represented Canada at the 2020 Summer Olympics. At the Olympics, Grainger won the gold medal in the women's eights boat, Canada's first in the event since 1992.
