= Hillary Janssens =

Canadian rower (born 1994)

Personal information
- Nationality: Canadian
- Born: July 21, 1994 (age 31) Surrey, British Columbia, Canada
- Height: 189 cm (6 ft 2 in)
- Weight: 78 kg (172 lb)

Sport
- Country: Canada
- Sport: Rowing
- Event(s): Pair, Four, Eight
- University team: UBC Thunderbirds
Medal record
Women's rowing
Representing Canada
Olympic Games
Bronze medal – third place	2020 Tokyo	Coxless pair
World Championships
Bronze medal – third place	2019 Ottensheim	Coxless pair
Gold medal – first place	2018 Plovdiv	Coxless pair
Silver medal – second place	2017 Sarasota	Eight (rowing)
U23 World Championships
Gold medal – first place	2016 Rotterdam	Coxless pair
Silver medal – second place	2015 Plovdiv	Coxless four
Bronze medal – third place	2014 Varese	Coxless four

Hillary Janssens (born July 21, 1994 in Surrey, British Columbia) is a Canadian rower from Surrey, British Columbia.

Hillary and her rowing partner Caileigh Filmer won a gold medal at the 2018 World Rowing Championships in Bulgaria and a bronze medal at the 2019 World Rowing Championships.

Hillary began her rowing career at the University of British Columbia in Vancouver in 2012. Achieving immediate success in the sport, Hillary joined the National Team in 2014. In 2016, she graduated from UBC with a Bachelor of Science degree in Biology. In her five years rowing for UBC, she was undefeated in the coxless pairs and set numerous school records for indoor rowing. Hillary currently resides in Victoria, British Columbia.

She represented Canada at the 2020 Summer Olympics.

She is the niece of NHL player, Mark Janssens.
