= Grace Latz =

American rower

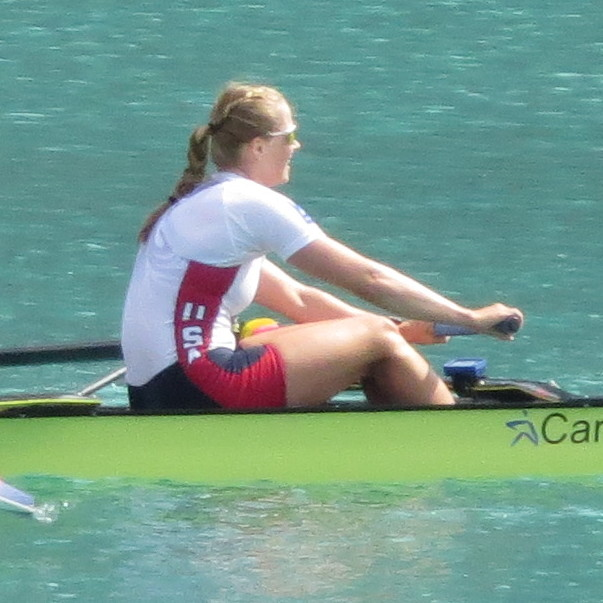
- In 2015 at Aiguebelette

Personal information
- Born: February 21, 1988 (age 38) Jackson, Michigan, U.S.
- Height: 6 ft 0 in (1.83 m)

Sport
- Country: United States
- Sport: Rowing
- Events: Women's sweep and sculling (W4x, W4-, and W8+)
- College team: Wisconsin Badgers
Medal record
Women's rowing
Representing the United States
World Championships
Gold medal – first place	2015 Aiguebelette	W4-
Bronze medal – third place	2014 Amsterdam	W4x

Grace Latz (born February 21, 1988) is an American rower, Olympian, artist, and announcer.

== Career ==
=== Rowing ===
Latz started rowing as a walk-on athlete at the University of Wisconsin-Madison. As a member of Badger women's rowing, she won a Big Ten Championship in the 2V8+ in 2008. In 2010, her performance in the V8+ helped the crew win its first and to-date only Big Ten Team Championship. Latz received the university's student-athlete community service award for co-founding ReThink Wisconsin, a recycling and sustainability program for on-campus athletic facilities. ReThink Wisconsin's founding group also included comedian Charlie Berens. Latz was a three-year member of the Iron Shield Society.

In 2014, Latz won a bronze medal at the World Rowing Championships at the Bosbaan in Amsterdam, The Netherlands, in the women’s quadruple sculls. In 2015 Latz, Kristine O'Brien, Adrienne Martelli and Grace Luczak took the gold medal in the coxless four at the 2015 World Rowing Championships in Aiguebelette, France. In 2016, Latz was a finalist in the women’s quadruple sculls in the 2016 Summer Olympic Games in Rio de Janeiro, Brazil, placing fifth. At the 2017 World Championships in Sarasota, Florida, Latz placed fourth in the women's eights.

By earning her spot on the 2016 Olympic team, Latz continued the streak for the University of Wisconsin to have an alumni compete in rowing at every Olympic Games since 1968. The streak has continued on through Paris 2024.

On August 20, 2025, the United States Olympic & Paralympic Committee announced it had appointed Latz to its Collegiate Advisory Council.

=== Art ===
Latz was selected for the Paris 2024 Olympian-Artist Program to implement collaborative and community-based art during the 2024 Summer Olympics. Through reassembling donated uniforms and equipment from Olympic sports through a local recycling center, Latz created a large-scale tapestry of the Olympic rings with the support senior Parisian citizens in the lead up to the 2024 Olympics. The piece was displayed during the Games at Clubhouse 24 at Palais de Tokyo and has subsequently become part of the permanent collection of the Olympic Museum in Lausanne, Switzerland.

Latz was previously selected for the Tokyo 2020 Olympian-Artist Program, however, that community-based project was postponed and eventually cancelled following the onset of the COVID-19 pandemic.

=== Broadcasting ===
Latz was hired to announce the 2024 US Olympic and Paralympic Trials - Rowing together with Lindsay Shoop on Peacock (streaming service). Latz has been part of the broadcasting teams for the Big Ten Women's Rowing Championships on the Big Ten Network and NCAA Women's Rowing Championships since 2024, and has co-hosted USRowing's Youth National Championships broadcast since 2023.
