= Katherine Douglas (rower) =

British rower

Personal information
- Birth name: Katherine Florence Douglas
- Born: 3 August 1989 (age 35); Edinburgh, Scotland
- Height: 181 cm (5 ft 11 in)

Sport
- Sport: Rowing
- Club: Leander Club

Lady Katherine Florence Douglas (born 3 August 1989) is a Scottish rower.

== Early life ==
Douglas was born in Edinburgh, the daughter of Stewart and Amanda Douglas, the Earl and Countess of Morton. She boarded at Fettes College in Edinburgh, where she took up athletics and competed at the Scottish School Championships as well as representing Edinburgh Athletics Club. She began rowing while studying geography and anthropology at Oxford Brookes University.

== Rowing career ==
Douglas was a member of the Scotland Team at the 2014 Commonwealth Rowing Championships.

She was selected for the British team to compete in the rowing events, in the eight for the 2020 Summer Olympics.
