= Yuliya Kalinovskaya =

Russian rower

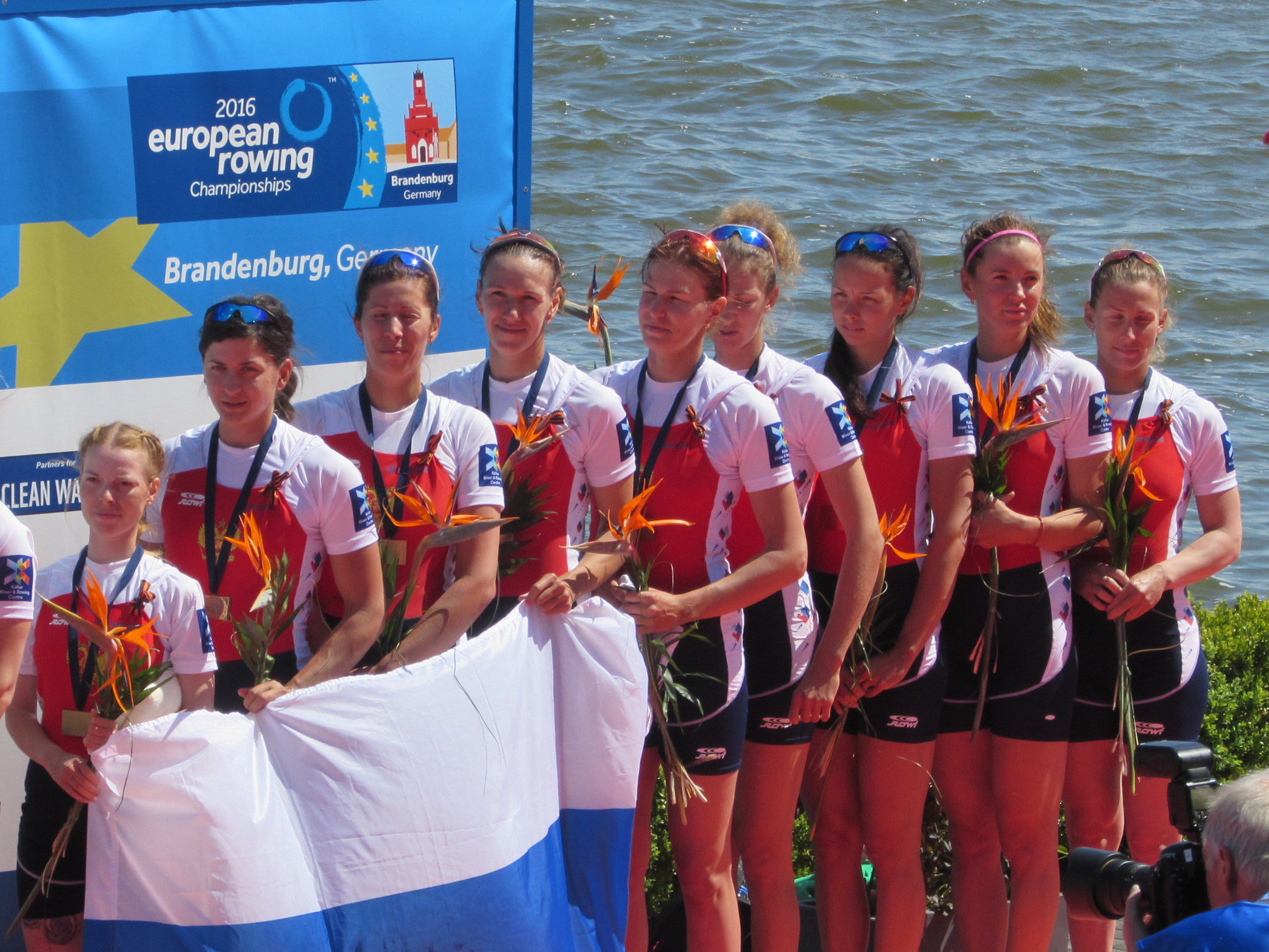
- Julija Inosemzewa, Julija Popowa, Alewtina Sawkina, Anastassija Karabelschtschikowa, Alexandra Fjodorowa, Jelena Lebedewa, Jelena Oriabinskaja, Ksenija Wolkowa, Ruder-EM 2016

Personal information
- Nationality: Russian
- Born: 27 February 1983 (age 42); Astrakhan, Russia

Sport
- Sport: Rowing

Yuliya Kalinovskaya (born 27 February 1983) is a Russian rower. She competed at the 2004 Summer Olympics and the 2008 Summer Olympics. In 2004, she placed 10th in the Rowing Double Sculls, Women's event. In 2008, she place 7th in the Rowing Quadruple Sculls, Women's event.
