= Kirstyn Goodger =

New Zealand rower (born 1991)

Personal information
- Nationality: New Zealand
- Born: Kirstyn Moana Goodger; 19 January 1991 (age 35) Auckland, New Zealand
- Education: Saint Kentigern College
- Height: 179 cm (5 ft 10 in)

Sport
- Country: New Zealand
- Sport: Rowing
- Event: Eight
Medal record
Women's rowing
Representing New Zealand
World Junior Championships
Silver medal – second place	2009 Brive-la-Gaillarde	Women's eight

Kirstyn Moana Goodger (born 19 January 1991) is a New Zealand rower. Originally from Auckland and now based in Cambridge, she took up rowing in 2005. She has won one international medal for New Zealand – a silver at the 2009 World Rowing Junior Championships in France. From 2011 to 2014, she rowed for the Washington Huskies while studying oceanography at the University of Washington. Upon her return to New Zealand, she joined the Wairau Rowing Club and is one of the premier rowers who belongs to the Central Rowing Performance Centre. Goodger has been an elite rower for the national squad since 2017. She has represented her country at several World Rowing Cups, the 2017 and the 2019 World Rowing Championships. At the latter regatta, she managed to qualify the women's quad scull boat category for the 2020 Tokyo Olympics. She was chosen as one of ten rowers for the New Zealand women's eight and travelled to the Games with the team. The woman's eight squad would come away with a silver medal in the eight at the 2020 games. Goodger has won four premier national titles in the women's eight. She worked as a scientist and engineer for consultancy Beca in their ports and coastal team.

== Early life ==
Goodger was born in Auckland in 1993. Her parents are Ray and Allyson Goodger and she has a younger brother, Eric Goodger who is the lead Guitarist of the NZ band Flaxxies. She received her secondary education at Saint Kentigern College where she took up rowing in 2005. (Note: Her Rowing New Zealand biography says 2006 but this is incorrect as Goodger competed in the April 2005 Maadi Cup on Lake Karapiro.) After the 2009 World Rowing Junior Championships, she moved to Seattle to study oceanography at the University of Washington; she graduated with a science degree in 2014. Since July 2015, she has worked for consultancy Beca in their ports and coastal team.

== Career ==
=== Junior rowing ===
Rowing since 2005, Goodger took up the sport at Saint Kentigern College. She competed at her last Maadi Cup—the regatta for New Zealand schools—in March 2008. After she left school, she joined the North Shore Rowing Club and first competed at the New Zealand national championships in February 2009 on Lake Ruataniwha. She competed in two club boat classes and one senior boat class. She came second with the senior eight. In the club boat classed, she came second with the eight and fourth with the coxed four. Goodger was picked for the junior national rowing squad and went to the August 2009 World Rowing Junior Championships in Brive-la-Gaillarde, France, where she won silver with the junior women's eight. Others in that boat who would later become high performance rowers were Zoe Stevenson, Eve MacFarlane, and coxswain Francie Turner.

At the February 2010 New Zealand national championships held at Lake Karapiro, she competed in two U21 boat classes. With the coxless four, she came in fourth place. With the coxless pair, she came fifth.

=== Washington Huskies ===
After that, she went to the United States for tertiary study. As a student, she rowed for the University's Washington Huskies in the top varsity eight for all her four years. She won four consecutive Windermere Cups and three Class Days regattas (2011,2012,2014). In 2012, they came sixth at the National Collegiate Athletic Association (NCAA) rowing championships, third at the Pac-12 Conference, defended their Windermere Cup title, and came fifth in the San Diego Crew Classic. They won the Head of the Lake regatta that is held annually on Lake Washington. In 2014, she was elected team Captain and came fourth at the NCAA championship, second at the Pac-12 Conference, and defeated Great Britain's elite rowing team to win the Windermere Cup. At the San Diego Crew Classic, they came second. She graduated in 2014 with a Bachelor science majoring in Oceanography.

=== Senior rowing ===
When Goodger returned to New Zealand, she joined the Central Rowing Performance Centre and the Wairau Rowing Club. Her first regatta back in home country was in December 2014 in Marlborough. At the New Zealand national championships in February 2015 on Lake Ruataniwha, she rowed the coxless pair in two boat classes. In the senior class, they won but were later disqualified due to the boat not meeting weight regulations. In the premier (Note: Premier is the highest ability class in New Zealand and rowers can compete in this class once they have been accepted by one of the Regional Performance Centres (RPCs).) class, they came fifth. At the February 2016 New Zealand national championships held at Lake Karapiro, she competed in two premier boat classes. In the quadruple sculls, she came third alongside Erin-Monique O'Brien, Sophie MacKenzie, and Zoe McBride. With the eight, she won her first premier national championship title.

At the New Zealand national championships in February 2017 on Lake Ruataniwha, she competed in three premier boat classes. In the coxless pair with Jackie Gowler she came fourth. In the coxless four she came second but once again her team got disqualified due to boat weight regulations. In the eight, they came second. Subsequently, she was called into the national team and selected as a part of the sweep squad. At the 2017 World Rowing Cup II, she was teamed up with Jackie Gowler as NZ2 and they came fifth, with the final won by NZ1 (Grace Prendergast and Kerri Gowler, who is Jackie Gowler's elder sister). Shortly afterwards, the Gowler–Goodger team met the Gowler–Prendergast team in the semi-final of the Henley Royal Regatta, with NZ1 winning with "clear water". At the World Rowing Cup III on the Rotsee, they came sixth as NZ2, with NZ1 winning that final. At the 2017 World Rowing Championships in Sarasota, Florida, Goodger and J. Gowler teamed up with Charlotte Spence and Beth Ross to form a coxless four, and they came tenth at that regatta. Her performance during the year earned her a nomination at the November 2017 Marlborough Sports Awards.

At the New Zealand national championships in February 2018 on Lake Karapiro, she competed in two premier boat classes. In the coxless four, her team came second. In the eight, they won the national title. She then made the national rowing team as the reserve. However at the 2018 World Rowing Cup II in Linz–Ottensheim, she was part of the coxless four that came eleventh. At the World Rowing Cup III on the Rotsee, she competed in single scull and came second in the D final (20th overall). She was set to compete with the coxless four at the 2018 World Rowing Championships, but when Ellie Jeurissen recovered from an illness, the team composition was changed and Goodger returned to her reserve role.

At the New Zealand national championships in February 2019 on Lake Ruataniwha, she competed in four premier boat classes. In the quad scull, her team came second. In the double scull alongside Sophie MacKenzie, their final was scratched. In the single scull, she came fourth. In the eight, they defended their national title. She was again picked as part of the sweep squad for the national team. At the 2019 World Rowing Cup II in Plovdiv, Poland, she was part of the women's eight that came fourth. At the World Rowing Cup III in Rotterdam, the Netherland, she was placed in the women's pair with Ruby Tew and they came sixteenth. At the 2019 World Rowing Championships, Goodger was tasked with achieving Olympic qualification in the quad scull, which they achieved by coming fifth, with the top eight qualifying.

At the 2020 New Zealand rowing nationals at Lake Karapiro, Goodger competed in two boat classes. In the double scull, her final was scratched. In the single scull, she came fourth. Due to the COVID-19 pandemic, there was no international rowing during 2020.

In early February 2021, Rowing New Zealand announced the elite women's team for the Olympic year, with Goodger put into the sweep squad. Two weeks later at the 2021 New Zealand rowing nationals at Lake Ruataniwha, Goodger competed in two boat classes. In the quad scull, the team came third. In the eight, she won her fourth national title. When New Zealand's Olympic team was announced in June 2021, Goodger was one of ten rowers nominated for the eight. In November 2020, the World Rowing Federation predicted that New Zealand and Australia are currently so dominant that their teams would compete in the eight for gold and silver, with the remaining nations fighting over bronze. Former Olympian Sarah Cowley Ross, who commentated from Tokyo for TVNZ, expected the eight to get a medal. Sports bookmaker Pinnacle offered very low odds for the women's eight to win gold. As of 9 July, for every dollar paid in, they would pay out $2.07 for the eight winning gold. In Tokyo at the Olympics, Grace Prendergast and Kerri Gowler did double-duty in the women's pair and the eight, with Goodger and Phoebe Spoors remaining unused reserve rowers.

=== National titles ===
National titles for senior rowers are known as Red Coats in New Zealand. As of 2021, Goodger has won four premier Red Coats.

Red Coats – New Zealand premier national titles
Eight	2016, 2018, 2019, 2021
