= Georgia Perry =

New Zealand rower

Personal information
- Born: 13 August 1993 (age 33)

Sport
- Sport: Rowing
Medal record
Women's rowing
Representing New Zealand
World Championships
| Bronze medal – third place | 2017 Sarasota | Eight |

Georgia Perry (born 13 August 1993) is a New Zealand rower.

== Private life ==
Perry was born in 1993 and grew up in Horotiu north of Hamilton. She received her secondary education at St Peter's School in Cambridge. She is enrolled at the University of Waikato, studying towards a Bachelor of Media and Creative Technologies.

== Rowing career ==
Perry took up rowing in 2007. She had an early defining moment in 2008 when she won silver with the under 15 girls' coxed quad sculls at the Maadi Cup, held at Lake Ruataniwha that year:

That was what started the belief that I was actually good enough to be the best in the country at something.

In 2011, she won the U18 coxed four and the U18 coxed quad sculls at the Maadi Cup, and that gained her a place with New Zealand's U18 squad that went to the World Rowing Junior Championships in August 2011 in Dorney, England. She competed with the junior women's quadruple sculls and they came ninth. In the following year, she competed at the 2012 World Rowing U23 Championships in Amsterdam, Netherlands with the U23 women's four (Grace Prendergast was in the team) and they came fourth. In 2013, she made New Zealand's elite rowing team for the first time, and she rowed with the women's quadruple sculls at the 2013 World Rowing Championships in Chungju, Korea where they came seventh. At the New Zealand national championships in February 2014, she won gold with the women's premier coxless quad sculls (with Zoe Stevenson, Sarah Gray, and Julia Edward). The same team again won the national championships in 2015.

Internationally, she remained with the women's quadruple sculls and competed at the World Championships in 2014 (Amsterdam, fifth place) and 2015 (Aiguebelette-le-Lac, sixth place).

At the 2016 national championships, she won two national titles: in the women's premier coxless quad sculls (with a new team composition), and in the women's premier double sculls (with Claudia Hyde). To qualify the women's quadruple sculls for the 2016 Rio Olympics, the team had to achieve a top-two finish in May 2016 at the Final Olympic Qualification Regatta in Lucerne, Switzerland, but they came third.

At the 2017 national championships, Perry once again became national champion with the women's premier coxless quad sculls. She won a bronze medal with the New Zealand women's eight at the 2017 World Rowing Championships in Sarasota, Florida.

== Major results ==
2020

2nd Time trial, National Championships

2022

4th Time trial, National Championships

2023
National Championships

1st Time trial
2nd Road race
