= Lucy Spoors =

New Zealand rower (born 1990)

Personal information
- Born: 24 December 1990 (age 35)
- Height: 183 cm (6 ft 0 in)
- Relative: Phoebe Spoors (sister)

Sport
- Country: New Zealand
- Sport: Rowing
- Events: Quadruple sculls, Coxless four, Eight
Medal record
Women's rowing
Representing New Zealand
Olympic Games
Silver medal – second place	2020 Tokyo	Eight
Gold medal – first place	2024 Paris	Double sculls
World Championships
Gold medal – first place	2019 Ottensheim	Eight
Bronze medal – third place	2017 Sarasota	Eight
World Championships (U23)
Bronze medal – third place	2012 Trakai	Quadruple sculls
World Championships (junior)
Gold medal – first place	2008 Linz	Coxless four

Lucy Spoors (born 24 December 1990) is a New Zealand rower. She is a 2019 world champion winning the women's eight title at the 2019 World Rowing Championships.

== Private life ==
Spoors was born in 1990. She received her secondary education at Christchurch Girls' High School and started rowing in 2005. She has younger twin sisters, Grace and Phoebe (born 1993), who both took up rowing, too.

== Rowing career ==
Her first international competition was at the 2007 World Rowing Junior Championships in Beijing, China, where her junior women's quad sculls team came sixth. At the 2008 World Rowing Junior Championships in Linz, Austria, she competed with the junior women's four and won gold. She transitioned to the U23 team for the 2009 season and competed with the U23 women's quad sculls; they came fourth at the World Rowing U23 Championships in Račice, Czech Republic, that year. Spoors competed in the same boat class at the 2010 World Rowing U23 Championships in Brest, Belarus, and the team came tenth that year. Three months later, Spoors competed for the first time at elite level. The 2010 World Rowing Championships were held on Lake Karapiro near Cambridge, New Zealand. Only four women's four team were competing, and the New Zealand squad came last.

In the following year, Spoors returned to the U23 level and at the 2011 World Rowing U23 Championships in Amsterdam, Netherlands, the U23 women's quad sculls team came fourth. The same boat class went to the 2012 World Rowing U23 Championships in Trakai, Lithuania, and her team won a bronze medal.

Spoors made the selection to the women's elite team in 2014. In the women's quad sculls, the team came fifth at the 2014 World Rowing Championships in Amsterdam, Netherlands. At the 2015 World Rowing Championships in Aiguebelette, France, the quad sculls team came sixth. To qualify the women's quadruple sculls for the 2016 Rio Olympics, the team had to achieve a top-two finish at the Final Olympic Qualification Regatta in Lucerne, Switzerland, but they came third.

She won a bronze medal with the New Zealand women's eight at the 2017 World Rowing Championships in Sarasota, Florida.
