= Nicole Hare =

Canadian rower (born 1994)

Personal information
- Nationality: Canadian
- Born: July 26, 1994 (age 31) Calgary, Alberta
- Height: 177 cm (5 ft 10 in)
- Weight: 75 kg (165 lb)

Sport
- College team: Washington State University
- Club: Calgary Rowing Club
Medal record
Women's rowing
Representing Canada
World Championships
Silver medal – second place	2017 Sarasota	Eight
World Rowing U23 Championships
Gold medal – first place	2016 Rotterdam	Coxless pair
Silver medal – second place	2015 Plovdiv	Coxless four
Bronze medal – third place	2014 Varese	Coxless four

Nicole Hare (born July 26, 1994) is a Canadian rower. In 2016, she was named to represent Canada at the 2016 Summer Olympics in the women's pair event. She competed at the 2020 Summer Olympics.
