= Sam Bosworth =

New Zealand coxswain

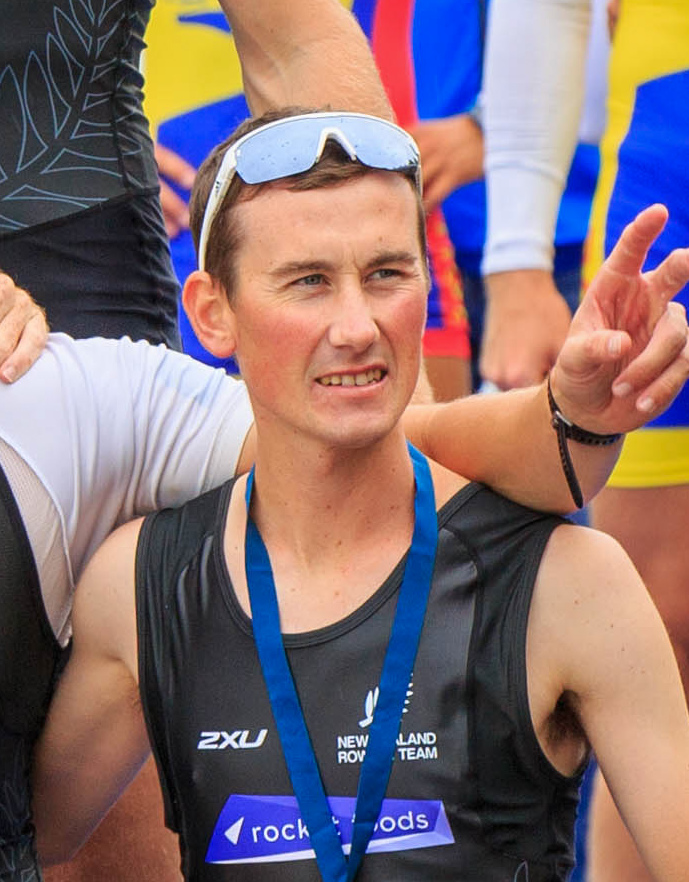
- Bosworth in 2021

Personal information
- Born: 5 April 1994 (age 32)
- Height: 169 cm (5 ft 7 in)
- Weight: 55 kg (121 lb)

Sport
- Sport: Rowing
Medal record
Men's rowing
Representing New Zealand
Olympic Games
Gold medal – first place	2020 Tokyo	Eight
World Championships
Bronze medal – third place	2017 Sarasota	Eight (women)

Sam Bosworth (born 5 April 1994) is a New Zealand coxswain. He is an Olympic champion and was the first male coxswain to win an international elite rowing event in a female crew.

== Personal life ==
Bosworth was born on 5 April 1994 and is from Waipara in North Canterbury. He received his education at Christ's College in Christchurch, and he took up rowing while at the school during 2009, moving to the sport from cricket. He is enrolled for tertiary study at Lincoln University, studying towards a bachelor of Environmental Management and Planning. In late 2016, he moved to Cambridge to be at the national rowing training centre.

== Rowing career ==
Bosworth is a member of the Avon Rowing Club. At the 2012 World Rowing Junior Championships in Plovdiv, Bulgaria, he won gold with the junior men's coxed four with Tom Murray, Michael Brake, Cameron Webster, and Thomas Jenkins. At the 2013 World Rowing U23 Championships in Linz, Austria, he won silver with the U23 men's coxed four. Bosworth won two subsequent silver medals at U23 World Championships in the same boat class in 2014 and 2015, both times beaten by the Italian team. At the 2016 World Rowing U23 Championships in Rotterdam, Netherlands, the U23 men's coxed four finally won gold, beating the Italian team.

In February 2017, the International Rowing Federation removed gender-restrictions from coxswains, and a month later, Bosworth was assigned the New Zealand women's eight. 2017 was his first year at elite level. The crew won the June 2017 World Rowing Cup II in Poznań, Poland, and Bosworth became the first male cox to win an international women's rowing event. On 2 July 2017, Bosworth's women's eight won the Remenham Challenge Cup at the Henley Royal Regatta. Bosworth then coxed the New Zealand women's eight at the 2017 World Rowing Championships in Sarasota, Florida. When they surprisingly won their heat, displacing the favourite team from the US to second place, he became the first male to win a race at a World Championship race with a female crew. In the A-final, the New Zealand team came third to win a bronze medal. He is the first male to ever cox for a female crew in New Zealand.

In August 2021, he coxed the New Zealand men's eight to a gold medal at the 2020 Tokyo Olympics.

In December 2022, he announced his retirement from rowing and look to start his next stage of life in London.
