= Beth Ross =

New Zealand rower

Personal information
- Nationality: New Zealand
- Born: Elizabeth Ross; 6 October 1996 (age 29)

Sport
- Country: New Zealand
- Sport: Rowing
- Event: Eight
Medal record
Women's rowing
Representing New Zealand
Olympic Games
Silver medal – second place	2020 Tokyo	Eight
World Championships
Gold medal – first place	2019 Ottensheim	Eight

Elizabeth Ross (born 6 October 1996) is a New Zealand representative rower. She won a gold medal as a member of the women's eight team at the 2019 World Rowing Championships.
