= Emma Dyke =

New Zealand rower

Personal information
- Nationality: New Zealand
- Born: 30 June 1995 (age 31) Invercargill, New Zealand
- Education: Craighead Diocesan School
- Height: 1.81 m (5 ft 11 in)
- Weight: 70 kg (154 lb)

Sport
- Country: New Zealand
- Sport: Rowing
- Event: Eight
- Club: Timaru
Medal record
Women's rowing
Representing New Zealand
Olympic Games
Silver medal – second place	2020 Tokyo	Eight
World Championships
Gold medal – first place	2019 Ottensheim	Eight
Silver medal – second place	2015 Aiguebelette	Eight
Bronze medal – third place	2017 Sarasota	Eight

Emma Dyke (born 30 June 1995) is a New Zealand rower. She is a 2019 world champion winning the women's eight title at the 2019 World Rowing Championships.

Dyke won a silver medal at the 2015 World Rowing Championships with the women's eight, qualifying the boat for the 2016 Olympics. With the women's eight, she came fourth at the 2016 Rio Olympics. At the 2017 New Zealand rowing nationals at Lake Ruataniwha, she partnered with Grace Prendergast in the premier women's pair and they became national champions.
