= Kelsey Bevan =

New Zealand rower (born 1990)

Personal information
- Nationality: New Zealand
- Born: Kelsey Campbell; 10 April 1990 (age 36) Auckland, New Zealand
- Education: Manurewa High School
- Height: 1.74 m (5 ft 9 in)
- Weight: 72 kg (159 lb)

Sport
- Country: New Zealand
- Sport: Rowing
- Events: Coxless four, Eight
- Club: Counties Manukau Rowing Club
Medal record
Women's rowing
Representing New Zealand
Olympic Games
Silver medal – second place	2020 Tokyo	Eight
World Championships
Gold medal – first place	2014 Amsterdam	Coxless four
Gold medal – first place	2019 Ottensheim	Eight
Silver medal – second place	2015 Aiguebelette	Eight
Bronze medal – third place	2017 Sarasota	Eight

Kelsey Bevan (married name Campbell, born 10 April 1990) is a New Zealand representative rower. She is an Olympian and a 2019 world champion winning the women's eight title at the 2019 World Rowing Championships.

Bevan was born in 1990. She received her education at Manurewa High School.

Bevan is a member of the Counties Manukau Rowing Club, and she started rowing there while at Manurewa High School. She won the gold medal in the coxless four at the 2014 World Rowing Championships in Amsterdam where the crew set the world record time (6:14.36). With the women's eight, she came fourth at the 2016 Rio Olympics.
