= 2018 World Rowing Championships – Women's eight =

Women's eight at the 2018 World Rowing Championships
- Venue: Plovdiv Regatta Venue
- Location: Plovdiv, Bulgaria
- Dates: 12–16 September
- Competitors: 72 from 8 nations
- Winning time: 6:00.97

Medalists
gold medal	Kristine O'Brien; Felice Mueller; Victoria Opitz; Gia Doonan; Dana Moffat; Tracy Eisser; Emily Regan; Olivia Coffey; Katelin Guregian	United States
silver medal	Lisa Roman; Stephanie Grauer; Madison Mailey; Susanne Grainger; Christine Roper; Sydney Payne; Jennifer Martins; Rebecca Zimmerman; Kristen Kit	Canada
bronze medal	Leah Saunders; Georgina Gotch; Rosemary Popa; Georgina Rowe; Annabelle McIntyre; Ciona Wilson; Jacinta Edmunds; Emma Fessey; James Rook	Australia

The women's eight competition at the 2018 World Rowing Championships in Plovdiv took place at the Plovdiv Regatta Venue.

== Schedule ==
The schedule was as follows:

Date	Time	Round
Wednesday 12 September 2018	11:17	Heats
Friday 14 September 2018	08:45	Repechage
Sunday 16 September 2018	11:10	Final B
Sunday 16 September 2018	12:47	Final A

All times are Eastern European Summer Time (UTC+3)

== Results ==
=== Heats ===
Heat winners advanced directly to the A final. The remaining boats were sent to the repechage.

==== Heat 1 ====
Rank	Rowers	Country	Time	Notes
1	O'Brien, Mueller, Opitz, Doonan, Moffat, Eisser, Regan, Coffey, Guregian	United States	5:56.68	FA
2	Hogerwerf, Oldenburg, Jorritsma, van Veen, Clevering, Lanz, Bouw, Wielaard, Noort	Netherlands	5:59.51	R
3	Xu, Li, Chen, Zhong, Qin, Xu, Huang, Yin, Zhang	China	6:05.31	R
4	Roman, Payne, Roper, Grauer, Mailey, Grainger, Martins, Zimmerman, Kit	Canada	6:07.69	R

==== Heat 2 ====
Rank	Rowers	Country	Time	Notes
1	Saunders, Gotch, Popa, Rowe, McIntyre, Wilson, Edmunds, Fessey, Rook	Australia	6:02.38	FA
2	Chitty, Girling, Gammond, Douglas, Hill, Norton, Bennett, Shorten, Horn	Great Britain	6:04.36	R
3	Greenslade, Parker, Spoors, Gowler, Ross, Dyke, Walters, Bevan, Bosworth	New Zealand	6:05.38	R
4	Vrînceanu, Bejinariu, Ailincai, Tivodariu, Parfenie, Popa, Bereș, Tîlvescu, Druncea	Romania	6:06.93	R

=== Repechage ===
The four fastest boats advanced to the A final. The remaining boats were sent to the B final.

Rank	Rowers	Country	Time	Notes
1	Hogerwerf, Oldenburg, Jorritsma, van Veen, Clevering, Lanz, Bouw, Wielaard, Noort	Netherlands	6:02.38	FA
2	Vrînceanu, Bejinariu, Ailincai, Tivodariu, Parfenie, Popa, Bereș, Tîlvescu, Druncea	Romania	6:03.93	FA
3	Roman, Grauer, Mailey, Grainger, Roper, Payne, Martins, Zimmerman, Kit	Canada	6:04.30	FA
4	Chitty, Girling, Gammond, Douglas, Hill, Norton, Bennett, Shorten, Horn	Great Britain	6:04.63	FA
5	Greenslade, Parker, Spoors, Gowler, Ross, Dyke, Walters, Bevan, Bosworth	New Zealand	6:04.79	FB
6	Xu, Li, Chen, Zhong, Qin, Xu, Huang, Yin, Zhang	China	6:13.04	FB

=== Finals ===
The A final determined the rankings for places 1 to 6. Additional rankings were determined in the B final.

==== Final B ====
Rank	Rowers	Country	Time
1	Greenslade, Parker, Spoors, Gowler, Ross, Dyke, Walters, Bevan, Bosworth	New Zealand	6:01.89
2	Xu, Li, Chen, Zhong, Qin, Xu, Huang, Yin, Zhang	China	6:18.33

==== Final A ====
Rank	Rowers	Country	Time
1st place, gold medalist(s)	O'Brien, Mueller, Opitz, Doonan, Moffat, Eisser, Regan, Coffey, Guregian	United States	6:00.97
2nd place, silver medalist(s)	Roman, Grauer, Mailey, Grainger, Roper, Payne, Martins, Zimmerman, Kit	Canada	6:03.05
3rd place, bronze medalist(s)	Saunders, Gotch, Popa, Rowe, McIntyre, Wilson, Edmunds, Fessey, Rook	Australia	6:03.86
4	Hogerwerf, Oldenburg, Jorritsma, van Veen, Clevering, Lanz, Bouw, Wielaard, Noort	Netherlands	6:06.48
5	Vrînceanu, Bejinariu, Ailincai, Tivodariu, Parfenie, Popa, Bereș, Tîlvescu, Druncea	Romania	6:07.99
6	Chitty, Girling, Gammond, Douglas, Hill, Norton, Bennett, Shorten, Horn	Great Britain	6:11.88
