= 2019 World Rowing Championships – Women's eight =

Women's eight at the 2019 World Rowing Championships
- Venue: Linz-Ottensheim
- Location: Ottensheim, Austria
- Dates: 27 August – 1 September
- Competitors: 100 from 11 nations
- Winning time: 5:56.91

Medalists
| gold medal | Ella Greenslade; Emma Dyke; Lucy Spoors; Kelsey Bevan; Grace Prendergast; Kerri Gowler; Elizabeth Ross; Jackie Gowler; Caleb Shepherd | New Zealand |
| silver medal | Leah Saunders; Jacinta Edmunds; Bronwyn Cox; Georgina Rowe; Rosemary Popa; Annabelle McIntyre; Jessica Morrison; Molly Goodman; James Rook | Australia |
| bronze medal | Felice Mueller; Kristine O'Brien; Meghan Musnicki; Dana Moffat; Olivia Coffey; Emily Regan; Gia Doonan; Erin Reelick; Katelin Guregian | United States |

The women's eight competition at the 2019 World Rowing Championships took place at the Linz-Ottensheim regatta venue. A top-five finish ensured qualification for the Tokyo Olympics.

== Schedule ==
The schedule was as follows:

| Date | Time | Round |
|---|---|---|
| Tuesday 27 August 2019 | 12:15 | Heats |
| Thursday 29 August 2019 | 13:43 | Repechages |
| Sunday 1 September 2019 | 12:06 | Final B |
| Sunday 1 September 2019 | 15:02 | Final A |

All times are Central European Summer Time (UTC+2)

== Results ==
=== Heats ===
Heat winners advanced directly to the A final. The remaining boats were sent to the repechages.

==== Heat 1 ====
| Rank | Rowers | Country | Time | Notes |
|---|---|---|---|---|
| 1 | Mueller, O'Brien, Musnicki, Moffat, Coffey, Regan, Doonan, Reelick, Guregian | United States | 6:07.04 | FA |
| 2 | Saunders, Edmunds, Cox, Rowe, Popa, McIntyre, Morrison, Goodman, Rook | Australia | 6:09.42 | R |
| 3 | Stepanova, Kovina, Potapova, Karpova, Zaruba, Tikhanova, Sevostianova, Oriabinskaia, Krylova | Russia | 6:10.51 | R |
| 4 | Cașu, Parascanu, Ailincai, Tivodariu, Parfenie, Popa, Rusu, Anghel, Druncea | Romania | 6:13.28 | R |
| 5 | Beeres, Oldenburg, Brandsma, van Veen, Jorritsma, Wilms, Rustenburg, Lanz, Fetter | Netherlands | 6:14.86 | R |
| 6 | Larsen, Sørensen, Davidsen, Ehlers, Hansen, Laidlaw, Steensberg, Kempf, Fejfer | Denmark | 6:28.56 | R |

==== Heat 2 ====
| Rank | Rowers | Country | Time | Notes |
|---|---|---|---|---|
| 1 | Greenslade, Dyke, Spoors, Bevan, Prendergast, K. Gowler, Ross, J. Gowler, Shepherd | New Zealand | 6:04.63 | FA |
| 2 | Gammond, Lee, Wratten, Taylor, McKellar, Shorten, Bennett, Norton, Horn | Great Britain | 6:08.81 | R |
| 3 | Qin, Miao, Wang, Liu, Huang, Zhong, Xu, Guo, Tan | China | 6:11.16 | R |
| 4 | Roman, Gruchalla-Wesierski, Wasteneys, Hare, Roper, Grainger, Janssens, Filmer, Kit | Canada | 6:11.58 | R |
| 5 | Meyer, Zeidler, Oertel, Göldner, Stöhner, Hundeling, Härtl, Wesselmann, Hillemann | Germany | 6:26.52 | R |

=== Repechages ===
The two fastest boats in each repechage advanced to the A final. The remaining boats were sent to the B final.

==== Repechage 1 ====
| Rank | Rowers | Country | Time | Notes |
|---|---|---|---|---|
| 1 | Roman, Gruchalla-Wesierski, Wasteneys, Hare, Roper, Grainger, Janssens, Filmer, Kit | Canada | 6:04.96 | FA |
| 2 | Saunders, Edmunds, Cox, Rowe, Popa, McIntyre, Morrison, Goodman, Rook | Australia | 6:06.07 | FA |
| 3 | Qin, Miao, Wang, Liu, Huang, Zhong, Xu, Guo, Tan | China | 6:08.63 | FB |
| 4 | Beeres, Oldenburg, Brandsma, van Veen, Jorritsma, Wilms, Rustenburg, Lanz, Fetter | Netherlands | 6:18.64 | FB |
| 5 | Larsen, Sørensen, Davidsen, Ehlers, Hansen, Laidlaw, Steensberg, Kempf, Fejfer | Denmark | 6:28.87 | FB |

==== Repechage 2 ====
| Rank | Rowers | Country | Time | Notes |
|---|---|---|---|---|
| 1 | Gammond, Lee, Wratten, Taylor, McKellar, Shorten, Bennett, Norton, Horn | Great Britain | 6:05.88 | FA |
| 2 | Cașu, Parascanu, Ailincai, Tivodariu, Parfenie, Popa, Rusu, Anghel, Druncea | Romania | 6:07.64 | FA |
| 3 | Stepanova, Kovina, Potapova, Karpova, Zaruba, Tikhanova, Sevostianova, Oriabinskaia, Krylova | Russia | 6:12.00 | FB |
| 4 | Meyer, Zeidler, Oertel, Göldner, Stöhner, Hundeling, Härtl, Wesselmann, Hillemann | Germany | 6:16.11 | FB |

=== Finals ===
The A final determined the rankings for places 1 to 6. Additional rankings were determined in the B final.

==== Final B ====
| Rank | Rowers | Country | Time |
|---|---|---|---|
| 1 | Qin, Miao, Wang, Liu, Huang, Zhong, Xu, Guo, Tan | China | 6:14.22 |
| 2 | Stepanova, Kovina, Potapova, Karpova, Zaruba, Tikhanova, Sevostianova, Oriabinskaia, Krylova | Russia | 6:17.34 |
| 3 | Beeres, Oldenburg, Brandsma, van Veen, Jorritsma, Wilms, Rustenburg, Lanz, Fetter | Netherlands | 6:19.15 |
| 4 | Meyer, Zeidler, Oertel, Göldner, Stöhner, Hundeling, Härtl, Höffgen, Hillemann | Germany | 6:28.71 |
| 5 | Larsen, Sørensen, Davidsen, Ehlers, Hansen, Laidlaw, Steensberg, Kempf, Fejfer | Denmark | 6:30.96 |

==== Final A ====
| Rank | Rowers | Country | Time |
|---|---|---|---|
| 1st place, gold medalist(s) | Greenslade, Dyke, Spoors, Bevan, Prendergast, K. Gowler, Ross, J. Gowler, Shepherd | New Zealand | 5:56.91 |
| 2nd place, silver medalist(s) | Saunders, Edmunds, Cox, Rowe, Popa, McIntyre, Morrison, Goodman, Rook | Australia | 5:59.63 |
| 3rd place, bronze medalist(s) | Mueller, O'Brien, Musnicki, Moffat, Coffey, Regan, Doonan, Reelick, Guregian | United States | 6:01.93 |
| 4 | Roman, Gruchalla-Wesierski, Wasteneys, Hare, Roper, Grainger, Janssens, Filmer, Kit | Canada | 6:03.04 |
| 5 | Gammond, Lee, Wratten, Taylor, McKellar, Shorten, Bennett, Norton, Horn | Great Britain | 6:06.96 |
| 6 | Cașu, Parascanu, Ailincai, Tivodariu, Parfenie, Popa, Rusu, Anghel, Druncea | Romania | 6:08.49 |
