= United States women's national rowing team =

Elite female athletes who represent the USA in international rowing competitions

The United States National Women's Rowing Team is a select group of elite female athletes who represent the United States in international rowing competitions. The team first competed at the Olympics in 1976 and has had a multitude of successes. The implementation of Title IX during the 1970s had a positive impact on women's collegiate rowing, and allowed for a growth in talent. The team is selected each year through a process that is facilitated by USRowing. Tom Terhaar served as the national women's head coach from 2001 until 2021. The team's eight (8+) won the gold medal at every summer Olympics between 2004 and 2016, finishing fourth at the 2021 Olympics. The US women's crew won every World Rowing Championships from 2005 through 2016.

== History ==
The first international race that included the United States women's rowing team took place at the 1976 Summer Olympics in Montreal. Prior to that summer, the United States women's rowing team did not compete at an international level. Other countries, like Germany and Russia, had strong national teams, and were already pushing to be recognized in international competitions. The International Rowing Federation, or FISA, began recognizing European women's teams in international competitions, which led to women's rowing becoming an Olympic sport. The International Rowing Federation introduced a women's commission in 1969, with the primary focus being the allowance of women to row at the Olympics and World Championships. As a result of the commission, six women's boat categories were added to the 1974 World Rowing Championships. This addition created more momentum towards the approval and inclusion of women's races at the Olympics, and in 1976 the same six races were officially added to the Olympic Games. The races were initially 1000 meters, but the International Rowing Federation pushed to change the race to the standard 2000 meters that men raced. This change was also implemented in the Olympics. Today, the same six races at the standard 2000 meters are held at international competitions.

== Title IX ==
=== Introduction of Title IX ===
In the 1970s, Title IX was implemented across college campuses in the United States. During this time women were seeking equal treatment in the world of athletics, specifically collegiate athletics. After the implementation of Title IX, collegiate athletic programs had to address the imbalance between men's and women's sports offerings and scholarships. Some elite colleges, like Yale University, already had women's rowing clubs or programs, but these programs had not been receiving the same funding or school support as the men's rowing programs. In 1975 the women's rowing team at Yale University protested to the athletic department for equal funding and conditions, and drew national attention to their program and to the need for equality in collegiate sports. The women on this team had previously been forced to wait for their men's team to shower after practice, and were not provided with a locker room or usable showers themselves. They sat in on buses and waited, no matter what the weather conditions were. At the time, the women's team was trying to gain access to usable showers. Collegiate and national journalists were able to capture the protest and draw attention to it.

For many colleges with large male athletic teams, like football programs, women's rowing was an easy addition. Women's collegiate rowing was added to the NCAA, and many universities began to add scholarships in order to attract women to the team. Rowing is unique in that many women who are highly competitive in other sports can also be very successful rowers. Women who had no prior rowing experience, but who may have been athletes prior to college, could now try to join growing programs and find success on a new team. Schools that had previously developed the reputation of having successful women's collegiate crew programs, like Harvard University, now had competition from large universities. Large schools were able to spend more money on the development of their women's rowing programs because they were also spending large amounts on their men's teams. This spread out the competition nationally, and eliminated the program divide between Ivy League schools and large public universities. Today, there are women's programs in all three divisions of the NCAA. Both private and public colleges competitively race, and the sport continues to grow in popularity.

=== Impact of Title IX ===
The development in women's collegiate crew programs directly impacted the success of the women's national team. Women's teams across the United States were becoming faster, and the talent pool for the national team began to grow. During the 1976 Summer Olympics, the women's team won a bronze medal. This was one of their first successful international races, and the women were determined to continue to develop and succeed on an international level. More and more collegiate athletes became hopeful that they could be selected for the national team, and the competition continued to increase. Today, thousands of women compete in high school, collegiate, and post-grad races. The growing popularity has allowed USRowing to add two additional national teams: the Under 23 National Team, and the Under 19 National Team. Both of these teams compete on national and international levels against athletes of the same age group and allow younger, developing athletes to compete at a high-level. Additionally, the teams help discover athletes who may be still developing, and who could later be selected for the senior national team. The senior team does not have an age limit, which makes it the most difficult to be selected for.

== Team selection ==
Each year USRowing facilitates the team selection process for both the men's and women's senior national teams. There are two ways to become a part of the senior national team for the United States: by winning certain races in small boats, or being invited to participate in selection camps.

Because rowing has multiple types of races and boats, it can be difficult to find the right athletes for certain spots on the team. The national team's smaller boats, and some of the boats without coxswains are the winners of specific races chosen by USRowing - typically the World Championship trials, National Selection regattas, and the FISA World Cups. Each year USRowing releases a document with the specific qualifications in order to be a part of the national team. The document can include specific placements in the selected races, or overall performances during the regattas. Typically, the winner of each race, and potentially a couple other places, are the selected groups to join the team.

For the more competitive races and bigger boats, like the women's 8+ and 4-, the athletes are chosen via the USRowing selection camp, which is an invitation-only event. The national team coaches distribute the invitations to athletes who meet a certain criteria that they set in collaboration with the USRowing organization. These criteria can include performance at identification camps, coach recommendations, performance in competition leading up to the present time, training performance, and other performances or recommendation-based qualities. If an athlete meets the qualifications, they are invited by the national coaches to the official selection camp. The coaches will then evaluate each athlete, and ensure that they are both compatible with the other athletes and capable of becoming a national team member.

These processes are also used for selecting the Under 23 and Under 19 national teams. The Under 23 team uses the Under 23 World Championship as a trial for boat eligibility, allowing each winning United States boat to be eligible for the team. The Under 19 team also has trial races, but only selects the single and double scullers and pairs from this race. Both the Under 23 and Under 19 teams have similar criteria in terms of recommendations, performance at national identification events, and overall ability for athletes chosen for the selection camps.

== Coaches ==
=== Tom Terhaar ===
The present senior national team head coach is Tom Terhaar. Terhaar was a rower himself, and competed at both the high school and collegiate levels for St. Joseph's Collegiate Institute, and Rutgers University. He began his coaching career as the men's lightweight coach for Columbia University, and transitioned to an assistant coach for the women's national team in 1994.

In 2001, Terhaar became head coach of USRowing. International competitors at this time had rigorous programs for their female rowers, with intensive training schedules and high expectations, but prior to Terhaar's promotion, the U.S. team had been practicing significantly less than their competition. Terhaar implemented a "three-a-day" practice schedule; one that is similar to the time demands of a full-time profession. Rowers had previously been expected to either sweep row or scull row in their training, but not both; however, Terhaar began training all of the rowers to be able to scull and sweep row. This allowed for the women to be more versatile in their rowing, and more flexible in terms of being in different boats. The switch in training approach, and increase in practices and intensity proved to be quite successful. Within the first year of Terhaar becoming head coach the team began to perform significantly better. Only a year after becoming head coach, Terhaar led the women to a gold medal at the world championships. At their first Olympics with Terhaar in 2004, the women's 8+ won a silver medal.

== Notable achievements ==
The women's team has achieved major wins in many recent international races. In every Olympics since his joining the team, the women's 8+ has medaled, and other boats have medaled or placed. Their silver medal in the 2004 Summer Olympics was the first medal the team had won in years. During the world championship that year the women finished with a silver medal, but have proven themselves and won nearly every year since then.

During the 2008 Summer Olympics in Beijing, the women's 8+ won gold. In the 2012 Summer Olympics the women continued to prove themselves, and commanded another gold. During the 2016 Summer Olympics the team won the competition yet again, and finished with another gold, beating out Great Britain by a few seconds.

Their recent performances at World Championships have been notable as they finished with multiple medals and achieved some of the fastest times in the world. Their first gold medal with Terhaar came during the 2006 world championships. They continued to win gold at the World championships through 2016. In 2017, the women placed fourth; a surprising result to end their 11 year winning streak.

Another one of the team's notable performances includes their world record for the women's 8+. During the 2013 world championships, the 8+ broke their own world record for the 2000 meter race, with a time of 5:54.160. The United States also set the world record in 1994 for the women's lightweight 4-, with a time of 6:36.400.

2019 Women's National Team
Boat Type	Athletes
Single Sculler	Kara Kohler
Lightweight Single Sculls	Emily Schmieg
Double Scull	Gevvie Stone, Cecily Madden
Lightweight Double Sculls	Michelle Sescher, Christine Cavallo
Lightweight Pair	Megan Kalmoe, Tracy Eisser
Quadruple Sculls	Lauren Schmetterling, Sophia Vitas, Emily Huelskamp, Kate Roach
Lightweight Quadruple Sculls	Mary Reckford, Rosa Kemp, Michaela Copenhaver, Jessica Hyne-Dolan
Four (4-)	Vicky Opitz, Madeleine Wanamaker, Caryn Davies, Molly Bruggeman
Eight (8+)	Felice Mueller, Kristine O'Brien, Megan Musnicki, Dana Moffat, Olivia Coffey, Emily Regan, Gia Doonan, Erin Reelick, Kateline Guregian (c)
