= 2016 World Rowing Championships – Women's coxless four =

Women's coxless four at the 2016 World Rowing Championships
- Venue: Willem-Alexander Baan
- Location: Rotterdam, Netherlands
- Dates: 22–27 August
- Competitors: 28 from 7 nations
- Winning time: 7:16:28

Medalists
gold medal	Fiona Gammond; Donna Etiebet; Holly Nixon; Holly Norton	Great Britain
silver medal	Molly Bruggeman; Emily Huelskamp; Corinne Schoeller; Kristine O'Brien	United States
bronze medal	Melanie Hansen; Ronja Schütte; Charlotte Reinhardt; Lea-Kathleen Kühne	Germany

The women's coxless four competition at the 2016 World Rowing Championships in Rotterdam took place at the Willem-Alexander Baan.

== Schedule ==
The schedule was as follows:

Date	Time	Round
Monday 22 August 2016	16:10	Heats
Tuesday 23 August 2016	10:50	Repechage
Saturday 27 August 2016	11:55	Final

All times are Central European Summer Time (UTC+2)

== Results ==
=== Heats ===
Heat winners advanced directly to the final. The remaining boats were sent to the repechage.

==== Heat 1 ====
Rank	Rowers	Country	Time	Notes
1	Molly Bruggeman; Emily Huelskamp; Corinne Schoeller; Kristine O'Brien	United States	6:41.88	F
2	Alena Furman; Marharyta Krechka; Tatsiana Piharava; Darya Marchanka	Belarus	6:45.91	R
3	Zhang Ting; Sun Hongjing; Li Yangyang; Teng Sunyan	China	6:48.38	R
4	Michelle Truax; Sarah Black; Kristin Bauder; Kerry Maher-Shaffer	Canada	7:03.02	R

==== Heat 2 ====
Rank	Rowers	Country	Time	Notes
1	Fiona Gammond; Donna Etiebet; Holly Nixon; Holly Norton	Great Britain	6:40.22	F
2	Melanie Hansen; Ronja Schütte; Charlotte Reinhardt; Lea-Kathleen Kühne	Germany	6:42.03	R
3	Kyra de Vries; Annemarie Bernhard; Willeke Vossen; Jocelyn Spruit	Netherlands	7:00.50	R

=== Repechage ===
The four fastest boats advanced to the final. The remaining boat took no further part in the competition.

Rank	Rowers	Country	Time	Notes
1	Melanie Hansen; Ronja Schütte; Charlotte Reinhardt; Lea-Kathleen Kühne	Germany	6:41.85	F
2	Alena Furman; Marharyta Krechka; Tatsiana Piharava; Darya Marchanka	Belarus	6:44.22	F
3	Zhang Ting; Sun Hongjing; Li Yangyang; Teng Sunyan	China	6:44.42	F
4	Michelle Truax; Sarah Black; Kristin Bauder; Kerry Maher-Shaffer	Canada	6:45.71	F
5	Kyra de Vries; Annemarie Bernhard; Willeke Vossen; Jocelyn Spruit	Netherlands	6:47.99	

=== Final ===
The final determined the rankings.

Rank	Rowers	Country	Time
1st place, gold medalist(s)	Fiona Gammond; Donna Etiebet; Holly Nixon; Holly Norton	Great Britain	7:16.28
2nd place, silver medalist(s)	Molly Bruggeman; Emily Huelskamp; Corinne Schoeller; Kristine O'Brien	United States	7:21.53
3rd place, bronze medalist(s)	Melanie Hansen; Ronja Schütte; Charlotte Reinhardt; Lea-Kathleen Kühne	Germany	7:26.15
4	Alena Furman; Marharyta Krechka; Tatsiana Piharava; Darya Marchanka	Belarus	7:33.61
5	Zhang Ting; Sun Hongjing; Li Yangyang; Teng Sunyan	China	7:35.01
6	Michelle Truax; Sarah Black; Kristin Bauder; Kerry Maher-Shaffer	Canada	7:38.59
