= West Side Rowing Club =

Rowing club in Buffalo, New York, U.S.

Coordinates: 42°54′04″N 78°54′05″W

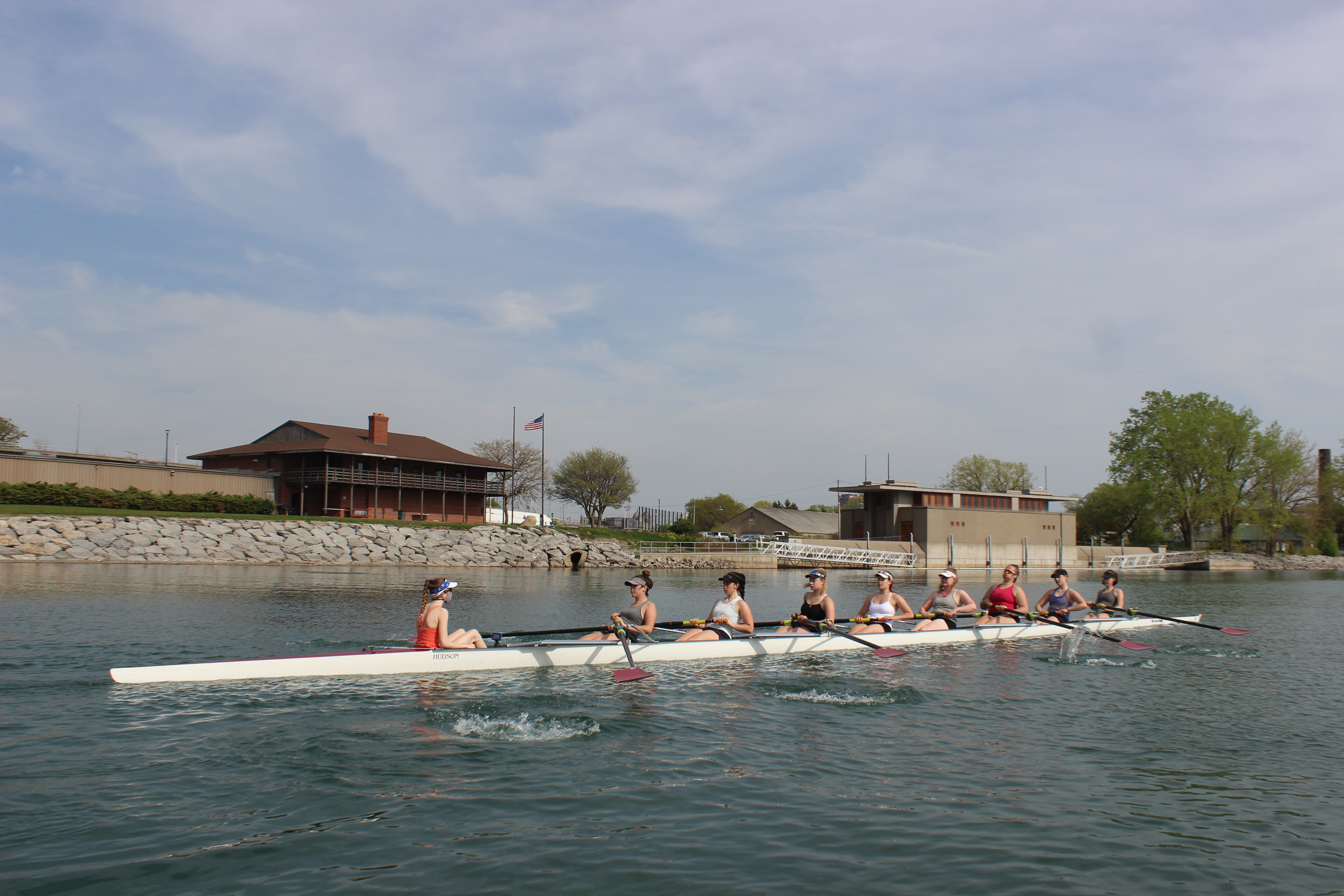
A women's 8+ rows by the West Side Rowing Club. The Frank Lloyd Wright designed Fontana Boathouse can be seen on the right.

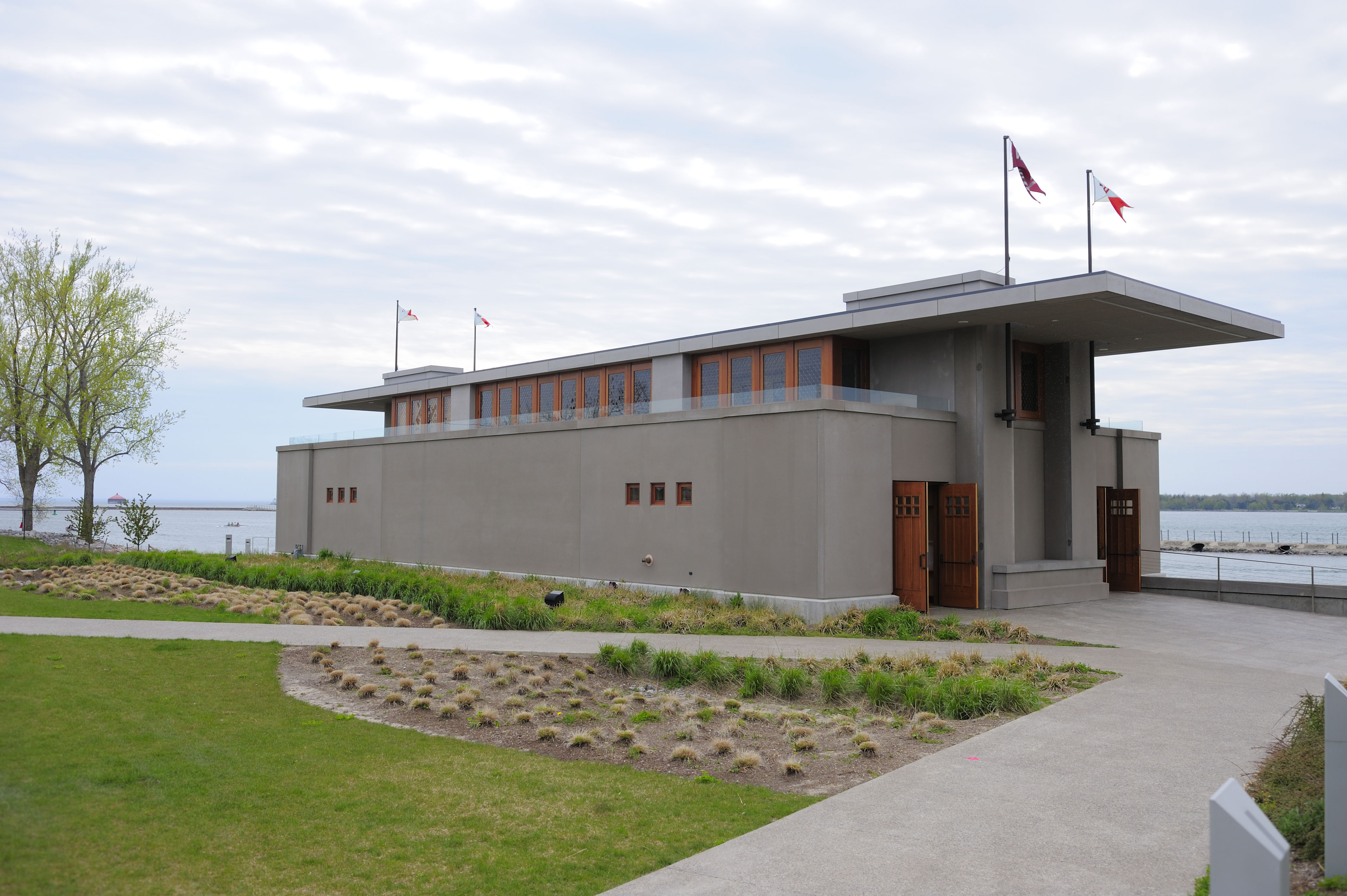
Fontana Boathouse

The West Side Rowing Club is a rowing club in Buffalo, New York. The club's athletes train, practice, and race along the Black Rock Canal and the Buffalo River. West Side is one of two rowing clubs in the city of Buffalo, the other being the Buffalo Scholastic Rowing Association to the south of downtown.

== History ==
The club was founded in 1912 at the southern tip of Squaw Island, now known as Unity Island. Although originally a men's club, West Side began sponsoring youth rowing programs as early as 1921. In 1975, the club burned down but was rebuilt in its present location near Porter Avenue shortly thereafter. Women's rowing began at West Side in 1978 and, as of 2023, outnumbers the men's programs. In 2007, the club expanded its facilities with the addition of a second boathouse. Using plans created for the University of Wisconsin by architect Frank Lloyd Wright, the Fontana Boathouse was built to house additional equipment and teams.

The club has produced rowers and coaches who have won multiple medals in the Summer Olympic Games. Tom Terhaar, coach of the United States National Women's Rowing Team, has won gold at every Summer Olympics game since 2008. Emily Regan, also a Buffalo native and a graduate of Nichols School, won gold at the 2016 Summer Olympics under Terhaar.

== Programs ==
The club offers programs to athletes in the junior, senior, master's, and pararowing boat classes, while also attracting athletes from area schools not offering rowing teams. Six high schools are partnered with West Side, including the Nichols School, Mount Saint Mary Academy, Nardin Academy, Gow School, St. Joseph's Collegiate Institute, and the public City Honors School. In addition to high schools, several colleges and universities are affiliated with the club, including Buffalo State College, Canisius College, and D'Youville College, all based within the city. The University at Buffalo, the larger SUNY university in the area, trains and races on Tonawanda Creek in the town of Amherst, but has been based at West Side in the past.

Each year, the West Side Rowing Club hosts between three and five regattas on the Black Rock Canal. The regattas draw thousands of athletes and hundreds of boats from the Western New York region, across the country, and internationally with Canada.

== Facilities ==
There are two facilities on the grounds of the West Side Rowing Club. The Doc Schabb Boathouse features an indoor rowing tank, ergometers and five bays of boat storage. The Fontana Boathouse was built in 2007 and is the newest facility at the West Side complex, home to the Canisius Golden Griffins women's crew since 2011. The design of the boathouse was adapted from plans by architect Frank Lloyd Wright for the Wisconsin Badgers Crew. When the University of Wisconsin–Madison suspended its football program in 1906 over safety concerns, plans for the boathouse were abandoned. Wright's plans were later reintroduced at West Side and the boathouse was constructed, opening in 2007.

== See also ==
- List of rowing venues
- List of rowing blades – Club oars
