= Gammond =

Gammond is a surname. Notable people with the surname include:

- Fiona Gammond (born 1992), British rower
- Peter Gammond (1925–2019), British music critic, writer, journalist, musician, poet, and artist
