= Rebecca Chin =

British rower, discus thrower, and shot putter

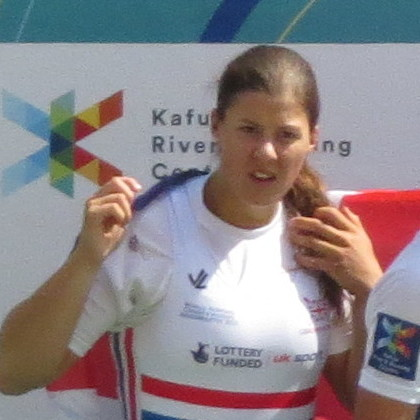
- Chin at the 2015 World Rowing Championships

Personal information
- Born: 11 December 1991 (age 34) St Asaph
- Height: 178 cm (5 ft 10 in)
- Weight: 75 kg (165 lb)

Sport
- Country: United Kingdom
- Sport: Rowing
- Club: Agecroft Rowing Club
- Coached by: Hamish Burrell; Robin Williams
- Retired: 2018
Medal record
Rowing
Representing United Kingdom
World Rowing Championships
Silver medal – second place	2015 Aiguebelette	Women's four
World University Rowing Championships
Gold medal – first place	2014 Gravelines	Women's four
World Rowing U23 Championships
Silver medal – second place	2013 Linz	Women's eight

Rebecca Chin (born 11 December 1991) is a retired British rower who competed in international events and a former Paralympic discus and shot put thrower.

== Paralympic career ==
Chin was born with hyperlax ankle ligaments. Chin competed in the Paralympic discus and shot put, in the F44 classification at the 2008 Summer Paralympics but was shifted to the F38 category as it was deemed appropriate for her unusual leg function. However, after her shot put event, she was stripped of her shot put silver medal due to an on the spot reclassification of her disability.

== Rowing career ==
During her rowing career, she competed in the women's fours events mainly with Karen Bennett, Pippa Whittaker and Michelle Vezie. She was part of the British team that topped the medal table at the 2015 World Rowing Championships at Lac d'Aiguebelette in France, where she won a silver medal as part of the coxless four with Karen Bennett, Lucinda Gooderham and Holly Norton.

Chin retired due to back injury in 2018 where she was aiming to compete at the 2020 Summer Olympics.
