= Emma Fessey =

Australian national representative rower

Personal information
- Born: 5 November 1996 (age 29)
- Home town: Brewarrina, New South Wales
- Height: 174 cm (5 ft 9 in)
- Weight: 74 kg (163 lb)

Sport
- Country: Australia
- Sport: Rowing
- Club: UTS Haberfield Rowing Club
- Coached by: John Keogh, Tom Westgarth
Medal record
Women's rowing
Representing Australia
World Championships
Bronze medal – third place	2018 Plovdiv	Women's eight

Emma Fessey (born 5 November 1996) is an Australian national representative rower. She is an Australian champion and was a medallist at the 2018 World Rowing Championships.

== Club and state rowing ==
Fessey was raised on a cattle and sheep property north of Brewarrina, New South Wales where her family were graziers. Her primary schooling was via the School of the Air. Her secondary education was at Loreto Normanhurst where she took up rowing. Her senior rowing club has been from the UTS Haberfield Rowing Club under coach David Gely who had also been her school coach.

Her state representative debut for New South Wales came in the 2016 youth eight which contested the Bicentennial Cup at the Interstate Regatta within the Australian Rowing Championships. Senior state honours came for Fessey in 2018 in the New South Wales women's eight which placed second in the Queen's Cup at the 2018 Interstate Regatta.

== International representative rowing ==
Fessey made her Australian representative debut to the Australian senior squad and straight into the stroke seat of the senior women's eight when they started their 2018 international campaign with a bronze medal win at the World Rowing Cup II in Linz, Austria. She then stroked the eight again to their fifth placing at the WRC III in Lucerne. Then at the 2018 World Rowing Championships in Plovdiv with Fessey again setting the pace, the Australian women's eight won their heat and placed third in the final winning the bronze medal.

In March 2022 Fessey was selected in the women's sweep squad of the broader Australian training team to prepare for the 2022 international season and the 2022 World Rowing Championships. She stroked the Australian women's eight at the World Rowing Cup II in Poznan to a third placing and at the WRC III in Lucerne to a gold medal. At the 2022 World Rowing Championships at Racize, Fessey stroked the Australian women's eight. They made the A final and finished in fifth place
