= Winter Park Crew =

Rowing club, based in Casselberry, Florida

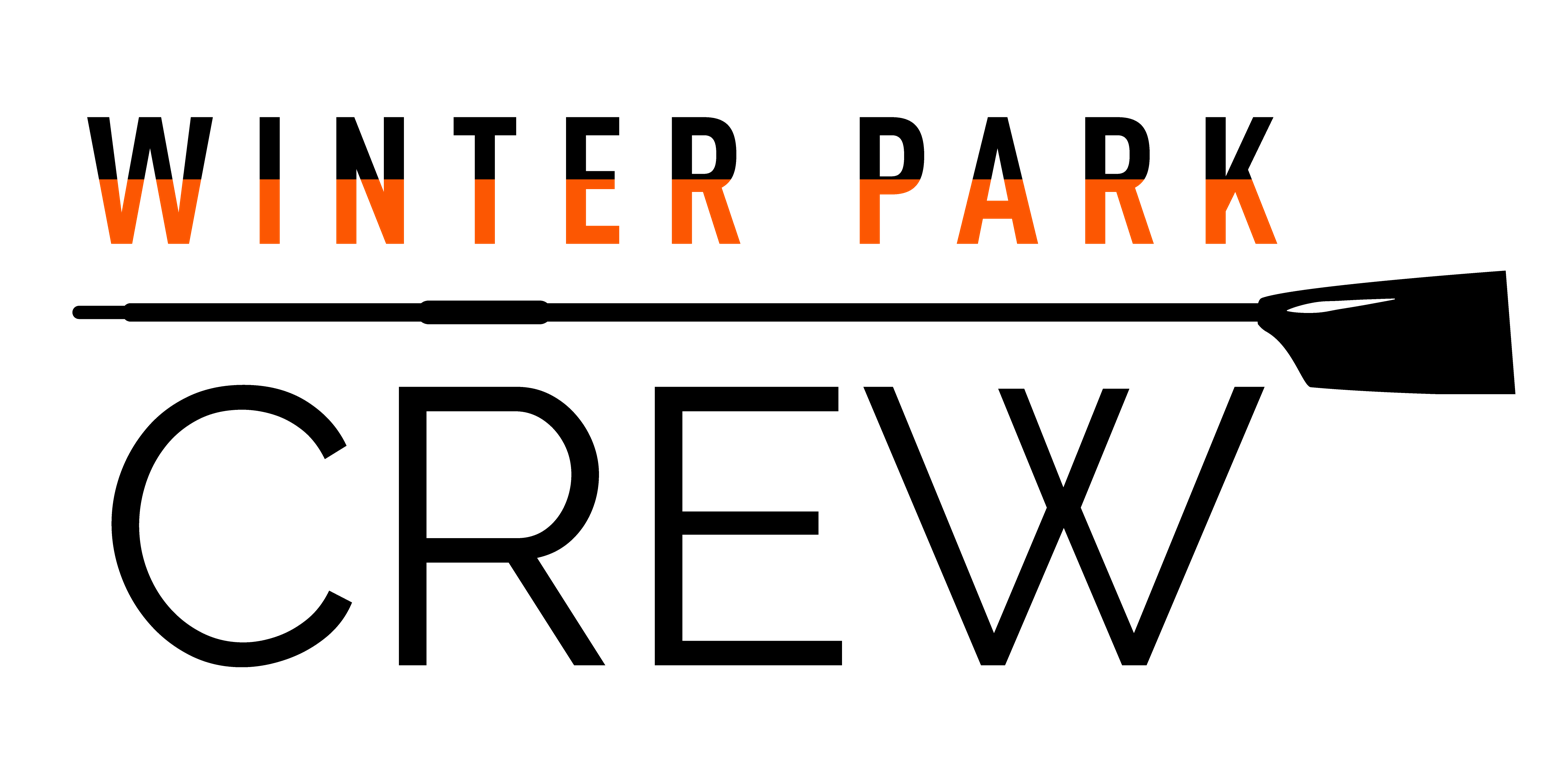
- Location: Winter Park, Florida
- Home water: Lake Howell
- Founded: 1962
- Affiliations: US Rowing
- Website: www.winterparkcrew.org

Notable members
- Katelin Snyder

Winter Park Crew is a rowing club in Winter Park, Florida. Winter Park Crew is a youth rowing program that includes a middle school program and high school program. The team has a tradition of winning with more than 30 state championships under its belt.

== Coaches ==
Michael Vertullo is the head coach of the Women's team. He joined Winter Park Crew in 1998 and in 2022 finished is 30th year as a coach. Prior to joining Winter Park Crew, he coached in New York. He attended college at Rutgers University where he himself was a rower.

== History ==
The club was founded in 1962 by a couple of guys with a dream and a borrowed rowing shell. At that time there were not enough boys to fill an entire shell. There were no girls on the team, that wouldn't happen for a few years. In those early days, the team rowed from the Rollins College boathouse.

In 2012, the team celebrated 50 years on the water.

Today the club rows from the McAllister Boathouse on Lake Howell in Casselberry, Florida.

In 2022 the Women's V8 earned a spot to row in the inaugural Prince Philip Challenge Trophy at the Henley Royal Regatta which is held annually in Henley-on-Thames, England.

== Honours ==
=== Scholastic Rowing Association of America "Nationals" ===
Year	Winning crew/s
2022	Girls V8, Gold Medal
2023	Girls V8, Gold Medal
2022	Girls Ltwt 8, Gold Medal
2022	Girls Freshman 8, Silver Medal
2022	Girls Ltwt Double, Bronze Medal
2021	Girls Ltwt 8, Gold Medal
2021	Girls V8, Bronze Medal
