= Leah Saunders =

Australian rower

Personal information
- Nationality: Australian
- Born: 7 February 1993 (age 33) New South Wales, Australia

Sport
- Country: Australia
- Sport: Rowing
- Event(s): Quadruple sculls, Eight
- Club: Sydney Rowing Club

Achievements and titles
- National finals: Queen's Cup 2015-18
Medal record
Women's rowing
Representing Australia
World Championships
| Silver medal – second place | 2019 Ottensheim | Eight |
| Bronze medal – third place | 2018 Plovdiv | Eight |
World Championships (U23)
| Silver medal – second place | 2015 Plovdiv | Quadruple sculls |

Leah Saunders (born 7 February 1993) is an Australian former representative rower, a medallist at the 2018 and 2019 World Rowing Championships.

== Club and state rowing ==
Saunders was raised in northern New South Wales and first rowed from the Lower Clarence Rowing Club before coming to Sydney in 2011 and taking up at the Sydney Rowing Club.

She was first selected to represent New South Wales in the women's youth eight which contested and won the Bicentennial Cup in the Interstate Regatta at the 2012 Australian Rowing Championships. In 2013 she rowed again in a victorious New South Wales youth eight. For five consecutive years from 2014 to 2019 she rowed in New South Welsh senior women's eights contesting the Queen's Cup at the Australian Interstate Regatta. In 2019 that New South Wales Women's eight broke the 14 year Victorian stronghold and took a Queen's Cup victory.

== International representative rowing ==
Saunders made her Australian representative debut in 2011 at the World Junior Rowing Championships at Eton Dorney. She raced in the quad scull which finished in overall tenth place. In 2014 and 2015 she rowed in Australian quads at the World Rowing U23 Championships. They placed seventh at Varese 2014 and took a silver medal at Plovdiv 2015. Saunders first made the Australian senior women's squad in 2017 and raced in the women's quad at the World Rowing Cups II and III in Europe before contesting the 2017 World Rowing Championships in Sarasota USA. At those World Championships the quad made the A final and finished in sixth place.

The women's eight with Saunders at bow started their 2018 international campaign with a bronze medal win at the World Rowing Cup II in Linz, Austria. Then at the WRC III in Lucerne they finished fifth. At the 2018 World Rowing Championships in Plovdiv the Australian women's eight with Saunders in the bow seat, won their heat and placed third in the final winning the bronze medal. In 2019 Saunders was again picked in Australian women's sweep squad for the international season. She rowed in the bow seat of the Australian women's eight to a gold medal win at Rowing World Cup II in Poznan and to a silver medal at WRC III in Rotterdam. Saunders was selected to race in Australia's women's eight at the 2019 World Rowing Championships in Linz, Austria. The eight were looking for a top five finish at the 2019 World Championships to qualify for the Tokyo Olympics. They placed second in their heat, came through the repechage and led in the final from the start and at all three 500m marks till they were overrun by New Zealand by 2.7secs. The Australian eight took the silver medal and qualified for Tokyo 2020.
