= Jacinta Edmunds =

Australian national representative rower

Personal information
- Nationality: Australian
- Born: 5 October 1994 (age 32) Queensland, Australia
- Height: 1.83 m (6 ft 0 in)

Sport
- Country: Australia
- Sport: Rowing
- Event: Eight
- Club: Commercial Rowing Club
Medal record
Women's rowing
Representing Australia
World Championships
Silver medal – second place	2019 Ottensheim	Eight
Bronze medal – third place	2018 Plovdiv	Eight

Jacinta Edmunds (born 5 October 1994) is an Australian former representative rower. She was twice an Australian champion and a medallist at the 2018 and 2019 World Rowing Championships.

== Club and state rowing ==
Raised in Brisbane, Edmunds' is the daughter of 1984 Olympic bronze medal winning rower Ian Edmunds and the sister of Olympian rower Madeleine Edmunds. Jacinta was educated at St Margaret’s Anglican Girls School at Ascot and her senior rowing has been from the Commercial Rowing Club in Brisbane.

Her state representative debut for Queensland came in the 2012 youth eight which contested the Bicentennial Cup at the Interstate Regatta within the Australian Rowing Championships. Senior state honours came for Edmunds in 2018 when she rowed behind her sister Maddie in Queensland's women's eight contesting the Queen's Cup at the 2018 Interstate Regatta. In 2019 she stroked the Queensland women's eight who placed fourth in the Queen's Cup.

In 2018 she crewed a composite Australian selection eight who won the women's eight title at the Australian Rowing Championships and in a composite Australian selection four she won the 2018 women's coxless four national title.

== International representative rowing ==
Edmunds made her Australian representative debut in a junior quad scull at the 2012 Junior World Rowing Championships in Plovdiv. That quad placed tenth overall. From 2014 to 2016 she represented Australia at World Rowing U23 Championships. She was in the Australian U23 eight at Varese 2014 and at Rotterdam 2016. At the 2015 U23 World Championships in Plovdiv she rowed in the Australian coxless four. All of those crews made the A finals but finished outside the medals.

Edmunds made the Australian senior squad and into the seven seat of the senior women's eight when they started their 2018 international campaign with a bronze medal win at the World Rowing Cup II in Linz, Austria. She was not in the crew for the WRC III nor for their victory at Henley but she was back in the eight for 2018 World Rowing Championships in Plovdiv where the Australian women's eight with Edmunds in the seven seat, won their heat and placed third in the final winning the bronze medal.

In 2019 Edmunds was again picked in Australian women's sweep squad for the international season. She rowed in the two seat of the Australian women's eight to a gold medal win at Rowing World Cup II in Poznan and to a silver medal at WRC III in Rotterdam. Edmunds was selected to race in Australia's women's eight at the 2019 World Rowing Championships in Linz, Austria. The eight were looking for a top five finish at the 2019 World Championships to qualify for the Tokyo Olympics. They placed second in their heat, came through the repechage and led in the final from the start and at all three 500m marks till they were overrun by New Zealand by 2.7secs. The Australian eight took the silver medal and qualified for Tokyo 2020.

In 2021 Edmunds was in the Australian senior squad and vying for a seat in one of the sweep-oared boats in the lead-up to the delayed Tokyo Olympics. When the final crews were announced six weeks out from the event, Edmunds was selected as a travelling reserve.

== Coaching ==
After competition, Edmunds held coaching roles at St Margaret’s Anglican Girls School in Brisbane.
