= Donna Etiebet =

British rower

Personal information
- Born: 29 April 1986 (age 40)
Medal record
Women's rowing
Representing Great Britain
World Championships
Gold medal – first place	2016 Rotterdam	Coxless four

Donna Etiebet (born 29 April 1986) is a British rower. In the 2016 World Rowing Championships, she won a gold medal in the women's coxless four event with Fiona Gammond, Holly Nixon and Holly Norton.
