= Holly Nixon =

British rower

Personal information
- Born: 7 December 1993 (age 32)
Medal record
Women's rowing
Representing Great Britain
World Championships
Gold medal – first place	2016 Rotterdam	Coxless four
Bronze medal – third place	2017 Sarasota	Quadruple sculls
European Championships
Bronze medal – third place	2017 Račice	Quadruple sculls
Bronze medal – third place	2021 Varese	Double sculls

Holly Nixon (born 7 December 1993) is a British rower. She won the gold medal in the coxless four at the 2016 World Rowing Championships with Donna Etiebet, Fiona Gammond and Holly Norton. She won a bronze medal at the 2017 World Rowing Championships in Sarasota, Florida, as part of the quadruple sculls with Bethany Bryan, Mathilda Hodgkins-Byrne and Jessica Leyden.

In 2021, she won a European bronze medal in the double sculls in Varese, Italy.
