= Lucinda Gooderham =

British rower

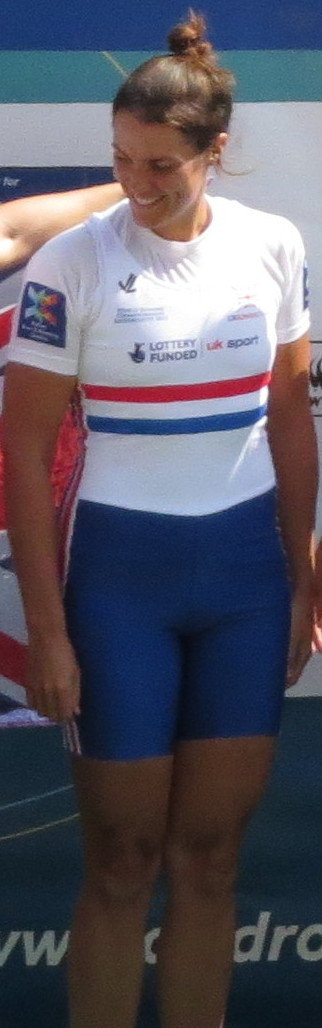
- Lucinda Gooderham at the 2015 World Championships

Personal information
- Born: 9 June 1984 (age 42) Garboldisham

Sport
- Country: Great Britain
- Club: Sport Imperial BC
Medal record
Women's rowing
Representing Great Britain
World Championships
Silver medal – second place	2015 Aiguebelette	Coxless four

Lucinda Elizabeth Gooderham (born 9 June 1984) is a former British rower.

== Rowing career ==
Gooderham represented England at U23 level before teaching full-time. She made her senior British debut in 2013.

After finishing in ninth place at both the 2013 and 2014 World Championships Gooderham was part of the British team that topped the medal table at the 2015 World Rowing Championships at Lac d'Aiguebelette in France, where she won a silver medal as part of the coxless four with Rebecca Chin, Karen Bennett and Holly Norton.
