= Georgina Gotch =

Australian rower (born 1994)

Personal information
- Born: 9 April 1994 (age 32)
- Education: Queenwood
- Height: 188 cm (6 ft 2 in)
- Weight: 72 kg (159 lb)

Sport
- Sport: Rowing
- Club: Sydney University Boat Club

Achievements and titles
- National finals: Queen's Cup (W8+) 2015–21; Australian Championship W2- 2019
Medal record
Women's rowing
Representing Australia
World Championships
Bronze medal – third place	2018 Plovdiv	Women's eight

Georgina Gotch (born 9 April 1994 in New South Wales) is an Australian former national representative rower. She was a four-time national champion and a medallist at the 2018 World Rowing Championships.

== Club and state rowing ==
Gotch was raised in Sydney and educated at Queenwood where she took up rowing. Her senior rowing has been from the Sydney University Boat Club.

She was first selected to represent New South Wales in the women's youth eight which contested and won the Bicentennial Cup in the Interstate Regatta at the 2012 Australian Rowing Championships. In 2013 she rowed again in a victorious New South Wales youth eight and then in the 2014 youth eight. For six consecutive years from 2015 to 2021 she rowed in New South Welsh senior women's eights contesting the Queen's Cup at the Australian Interstate Regatta. She stroked those VIIIs in 2015, 2017 and 2018 and saw a victory in 2019.

In a composite pairing with the West Australian Bronwyn Cox, Gotch won the 2019 Australian national title in the coxless pair at the 2019 Australian Championships.

== International representative rowing ==
Gotch made her Australian representative debut in 2011 at the World Junior Rowing Championships at Eton Dorney. She raced in the coxless four which finished in overall seventh place. In 2012 she again rowed in the coxless four at the Junior World Championships, making the A final and placing overall fifth. In 2013 she made it into the U23 Australian eight who at the U23 World Championships in Linz that year placed fourth. She raced in a coxless pair at the 2014 WRC I in Sydney and was in the U23 eight again for the 2014 U23 World Championships in Varese. In 2015 Gotch stroked the Australian quad to a silver medal win at the World Rowing U23 Championships in Plovdiv.

Gotch finally made the Australian senior squad and into the four seat of the senior women's eight when they started their 2018 international campaign with a bronze medal win at the World Rowing Cup II in Linz, Austria. Then at the WRC III in Lucerne they finished fifth. At the 2018 World Rowing Championships in Plovdiv the Australian women's eight with Gotch in the two seat, won their heat and placed third in the final winning the bronze medal.
