= Bronwyn Cox =

Australian rower (born 1997)

Personal information
- Nickname: Bronnie
- Nationality: Australian
- Born: 19 April 1997 (age 29) Bristol, England
- Height: 1.77 m (5 ft 10 in)
- Weight: 80 kg (176 lb)

Sport
- Country: Australia
- Sport: Rowing
- Events: Coxless pair, Eight
- Club: University of WA Boat Club

Achievements and titles
- Olympic finals: Tokyo 2020 W8+
- National finals: Queen's Cup (W8+) 2018–21; Aust Championship W2- 2019
Medal record
Women's rowing
Representing Australia
World Championships
Silver medal – second place	2019 Ottensheim	Eight
Silver medal – second place	2026 Amsterdam	Coxless four
Bronze medal – third place	2022 Račice	Coxless four
Bronze medal – third place	2023 Belgrade	Eight
World Championships (U23)
Silver medal – second place	2017 Plovdiv	Coxless pair

Bronwyn Cox (born 19 April 1997) is an Australian representative, national champion and Olympic rower. She was a silver medallist at the 2019 World Championships and won gold and silver medals at Rowing World Cups in the 2019 international representative season. She rowed in the Australian women's eight at the Tokyo 2020 Olympics and the Paris 2024 Olympics.

== Club and state rowing ==
Cox is a West Australian whose senior club rowing has been from the University of Western Australia Boat Club.

Her state representative debut for Western Australia came in the 2015 youth eight which contested the Bicentennial Cup at the Interstate Regatta within the Australian Rowing Championships. She made two further appearances in the West Australian youth eight in 2016 and 2017. Cox stroked the 2017 WA youth eight to a bronze medal in the Bicentennial Cup.

She made Western Australia's senior women's eight in 2018 and contested the Queen's Cup at the Interstate Regatta for WA in 2018 and 2019. In 2019 she stroked the West Australian women's eight to their third placing in the Queen's Cup and in 2021 and 2023 again raced in the event.

In a composite pairing with Georgina Gotch from the SUBC, Cox won the 2019 Australian national title in the coxless pair at the 2019 Australian Championships. In 2021 in a National Training Centre eight she won the open women's eight title at the Australian Championships.

== International representative rowing ==
Cox made her Australian representative debut in the coxless pair with Annabelle McIntyre at the 2017 World Rowing U23 Championships in Plovdiv. They rowed to a silver medal. In 2018 she was again selected in Australia's U23 coxless pair and rowed with her fellow West Australian Giorgia Patten to sixth place at the World Rowing Cup III in Lucerne. Cox and Patten then took the pair to the 2018 World Rowing U23 Championships in Poznan and finished in 5th place.

Cox was picked in the Australian women's sweep squad for the 2019 international season. She secured the three seat in the Australian women's eight for both World Rowing Cups in Europe winning a gold medal at the WRC II in Poznan and silver at WRC III in Rotterdam. Cox was selected to race in Australia's women's eight at the 2019 World Rowing Championships in Linz, Austria. The eight were looking for a top five finish at the 2019 World Championships to qualify for the Tokyo Olympics. They placed second in their heat, came through the repechage and led in the final from the start and at all three 500m marks till they were overrun by New Zealand by 2.7secs. The Australian eight took the silver medal and qualified for Tokyo 2020.

At the Tokyo 2020 Olympics the Australian women's eight were placed third in their heat, fourth in the repechage and fifth in the Olympic A final. Had they managed to maintain their time of 5:57:15 that they achieved in their repechage they would have beaten the winners, Canada, by nearly two seconds and won the gold medal.

Cox was selected in the Australian women's sweep squad to prepare for the 2022 international season and the 2022 World Rowing Championships. She rowed in Australian women's coxless four at the World Rowing Cup II in Poznan and in the two seat of the eight at the WRC III in Lucerne to gold medals on both occasions. At the 2022 World Rowing Championships at Racize, she rowed in the Australian coxless four to a bronze medal.

In March 2023 Cox was again selected in the Australian senior women's sweep-oar squad for the 2023 international season. At the Rowing World Cup II in Varese Italy, Cox stroked the Australian women's eight. They led from the start in the A final and won the gold medal. At 2023's RWC III in Lucerne, the eight was unchanged. In the final they led through to the 1500m mark but finished in third place for the bronze medal. For the 2023 World Rowing Championships in Belgrade Serbia, the Australian women's eight was unchanged aside from some seat shifts in the bow end and Cox again stroked the crew. They finished 2nd in their heat and needed to proceed through a repechage which they won. In the A final they led through the first 1000m on a low rating of 37/38 but were rowed through by the high-rating Romanians and a fast finishing USA eight. The Australians won the bronze medal, a 3rd place world ranking and Paris 2024 qualification.

Bronwyn was selected to the Australia Women's Eight for the 2024 Paris Olympic Games. The crew placed second in their Heat in the third fastest qualifying time (6:18.61) but booked a spot in the repechage two days later. They were third in the Rep, with the US and Canada getting their bows in front but beating Italy and Denmark to secure their A Final spot. In the A Final, eventual winners Romania dominated the race and the Australian crew finished fourth - the best result for an Australian Women's Eight in Olympic history, and just 1.2 seconds back from bronze medalists, Great Britain.
