= Georgina Rowe =

Australian rower

Personal information
- Nickname: Georgie
- Born: 13 November 1992 (age 33) North Sydney, New South Wales, Australia
- Height: 1.85 m (6 ft 1 in)

Sport
- Country: Australia
- Sport: Rowing
- Event: Eight
- Club: UTS Haberfield Rowing Club

Achievements and titles
- Olympic finals: Tokyo 2020 W8+
- National finals: Queen's Cup 2018,19,21
Medal record
Women's rowing
Representing Australia
World Championships
Silver medal – second place	2019 Ottensheim	Eight
Silver medal – second place	2026 Amsterdam	Coxless four
Bronze medal – third place	2018 Plovdiv	Eight
Bronze medal – third place	2023 Belgrade	Eight

Georgina Rowe (born 13 November 1992) is an Australian national representative rower, an Olympian and medallist at the 2018 and 2019 World Rowing Championships. She was a 2016 indoor rowing Australian champion and a winner of the Remenham Challenge Cup at the 2018 Henley Royal Regatta. She rowed in the Australian women's eight at the Tokyo 2020 Olympics.

== Early sporting life ==
Rowe was raised on Sydney's northern beaches, attending Davidson High School in Frenchs Forest. She is the niece of Australian dual-Olympian kayaker Shelley Oates-Wilding and as a girl she aspired to kayaking success and trained in that sport. By the end of high-school she had joined at Collaroy SLSC and was competing in surf-boat racing at state and national carnivals.

She was encouraged by surfboat colleagues to the attend the 2016 Australian National Indoor Rowing Championship, which she won. She then met coaching staff from Rowing Australia and the UTS Haberfield Rowing Club who encouraged her to compete at the 2017 World Indoor Rowing Championships in Boston. There she placed second to Olena Buryak in the CRASH-B Sprints – women's open 2000m category.

== Club and state stillwater rowing ==
Rowe joined the UTS Haberfield Rowing Club in Sydney. She raced for New South Wales in the state representative eight who contested and placed second in the 2018 Queen's Cup at the Interstate Regatta within the Australian Rowing Championships. In 2019, she was again in the New South Wales Women's eight when they broke the 14 year Victorian stronghold and took a Queen's Cup victory. She rowed again in the New South Wales Queen's Cup eights of 2021, 2022 and 2023.

In 2018, she crewed a composite Australian selection eight who won the women's eight title at the Australian Rowing Championships. She repeated that feat and again won that title in a National Training Centre eight in 2021. At the 2023 Australian Rowing Championships, she won the quad scull national title in a composite crew.

== International representative rowing ==
Rowe made her Australian representative debut straight into the senior squad and into the engine room – the five seat – of the women's eight when they started their 2018 international campaign with a bronze medal win at the World Rowing Cup II in Linz, Austria. In their second competitive outing of the 2018 international season in an Australian selection eight and racing as the Georgina Hope Rinehart National Training Centre, after Rowing Australia patron, Gina Rinehart, Rowe won the 2018 Remenham Challenge Cup at the Henley Royal Regatta. Then at the WRC III in Lucerne they finished fifth. At the 2018 World Rowing Championships in Plovdiv the Australian women's eight with Rowe seated at four, won their heat and placed third in the final winning the bronze medal.

In 2019 Rowe was again picked in Australian women's sweep squad for the international season. She rowed in the four seat of the Australian women's eight to a gold medal win at Rowing World Cup II in Poznan and to a silver medal at WRC III in Rotterdam. Rowe was selected to race in Australia's women's eight at the 2019 World Rowing Championships in Linz, Austria. The eight were looking for a top five finish at the 2019 World Championships to qualify for the Tokyo Olympics. They placed second in their heat, came through the repechage and led in the final from the start and at all three 500m marks till they were overrun by New Zealand by 2.7secs. The Australian eight took the silver medal and qualified for Tokyo 2020.

At the Tokyo 2020 Olympics the Australian women's eight were placed third in their heat, fourth in the repechage and fifth in the Olympic A final. Had they managed to maintain their time of 5:57:15 that they achieved in their repechage they would have beaten the winners, Canada, by nearly two seconds and won the gold medal.

Rowe was selected in the Australian women's sweep squad for the 2022 international season and the 2022 World Rowing Championships. She rowed in the seven seat of the Australian women's eight at the World Rowing Cup II in Poznan to a third placing and at the WRC III in Lucerne to a gold medal. At the 2022 World Rowing Championships at Racize, Rowe was again in the seven seat of the Australian eight. They made the A final and finished in fifth place.

In March 2023, Rowe was again selected in the Australian senior women's sweep-oar squad for the 2023 international season. At the Rowing World Cup II in Varese Italy, Rowe raced in the Australian women's eight. They led from the start in the A final and won the gold medal. At 2023's RWC III in Lucerne, the eight was unchanged. In the final they led through to the 1500m mark but finished in third place for the bronze medal. For the 2023 World Rowing Championships in Belgrade Serbia, the Australian women's eight was unchanged aside from some seat shifts in the bow end and Rowe again raced in the five seat. They finished 2nd in their heat and then needed to proceed through a repechage which they won. In the A final they led through the first 1000m on a low rating of 37/38 but were rowed through by the high-rating Romanians and a fast finishing USA eight. The Australians won the bronze medal, a 3rd place world ranking and Paris 2024 qualification.

== Personal ==
Rowe was working as a registered nurse in aged healthcare when she made the switch from surf boats to still water rowing. Since then she has completed an MBA and a Masters in Public Health and post-rowing she expects to work in hospital administration.
