= Ciona Wilson =

Australian rower

Personal information
- Born: 18 June 1992 (age 34)

Sport
- Country: Australia
- Sport: Rowing
- Club: Tamar Rowing Club

Achievements and titles
- National finals: Queen's Cup 2013–15; Nell Slatter Trophy 2016 & 2018
Medal record
Women's rowing
Representing Australia
World Championships
Bronze medal – third place	2018 Plovdiv	Women's eight

Ciona Wilson (born 18 June 1992) is an Australian national representative rower from Tasmania. She is an Australian national champion, was a medallist at the 2018 World Rowing Championships and won the Remenham Challenge Cup at the 2018 Henley Royal Regatta.

== Club and state rowing ==
Raised Launceston Tasmania, Wilson was educated at Launceston Church Grammar School where she took up rowing. Her senior rowing has been from the Tamar Rowing Club in Launceston where her father and grandfather had been competitive members.

Her state representative debut for Tasmania came in the 2011 youth eight which contested the Bicentennial Cup at the Interstate Regatta within the Australian Rowing Championships. She rowed again in the 2012 Tasmanian women's youth eight at the Interstate Regattas of 2012. She made Tasmania's senior women's eight in 2013 and stroked that crew contesting the Queen's Cup. She rowed again in Tasmanian women's eights competing for the Queen's Cup at the Interstate Regattas of 2014 and 2015. In 2016 and 2018 she was Tasmania's single sculls entrant to race for the Nell Slatter Trophy at the Interstate Regatta. She placed sixth in the single scull on both occasions.

In 2018 she crewed a composite Australian selection eight who won the women's eight title at the Australian Rowing Championships and in a composite Australian selection four she won the 2018 women's coxless four national title.

== International representative rowing ==
Wilson made her Australian representative debut straight into the senior squad and into the engine room – the five seat – of the women's eight in their second competitive outing of the 2018 international season and racing as the Georgina Hope Rinehart National Training Centre, after Rowing Australia patron, Gina Rinehart. Wilson in the Australian eight won the 2018 Remenham Challenge Cup at the Henley Royal Regatta. Then at the WRC III in Lucerne they finished fifth. At the 2018 World Rowing Championships in Plovdiv the Australian women's eight with Wilson seated at six, won their heat and placed third in the final winning the bronze medal.

In 2021 Wilson was in the Australian senior squad and vying for a seat in one of the sweep-oared boats in the lead-up to the delayed Tokyo Olympics. When the final crews were announced six weeks out from the event, Wilson was selected as a travelling reserve.
