= Kristine O'Brien =

American rower

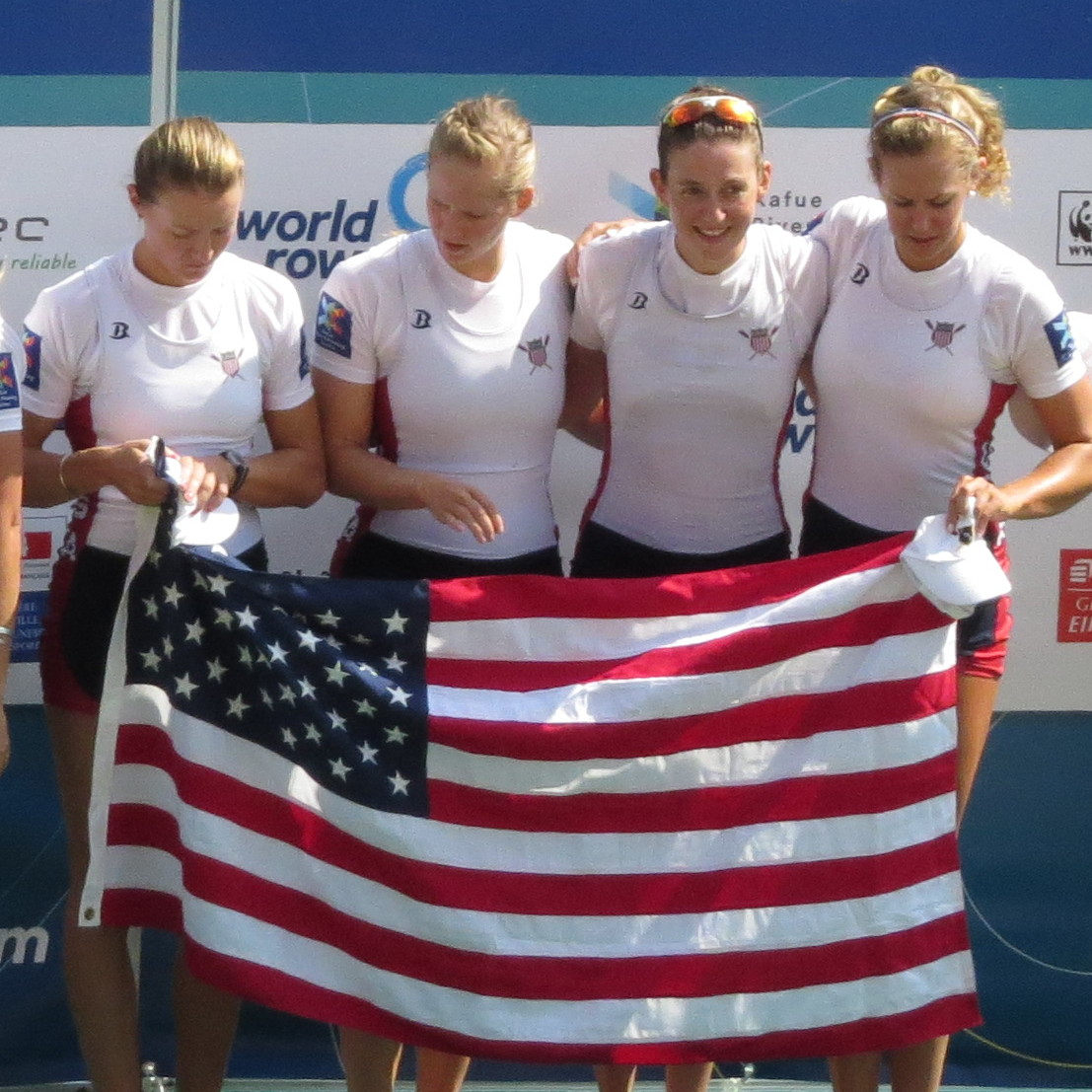
- The gold medal team in 2015 at Aiguebelette

Personal information
- Nationality: American
- Born: October 3, 1991 (age 35) Clane, Ireland
- Height: 5 ft 11 in (180 cm)
- Weight: 164 lb (74 kg)

Sport
- Country: United States
- Sport: Rowing
- Events: Coxless four, Eight
- College team: Virginia Cavaliers
Medal record
Women's rowing
Representing United States
World Championships
Gold medal – first place	2015 Aiguebelette	Coxless four
Gold medal – first place	2018 Plovdiv	Eight
Silver medal – second place	2016 Rotterdam	Coxless four
Bronze medal – third place	2019 Ottensheim	Eight

Kristine O'Brien (born October 3, 1991) is an American rower. In 2015 O'Brien, Adrienne Martelli, Grace Latz and Grace Luczak took the gold medal in the coxless four at the 2015 World Rowing Championships.

O'Brien and her twin sister were raised in Massapequa Park, New York, after moving to America from Ireland at two years old. A Catholic, she attended St. John the Baptist Diocesan High School in West Islip. She rowed at the University of Virginia, and was named the 2012 USRowing Fan's Choice Collegiate Rower of the Year.

In 2018 she was selected to the women's eight and rowed bow-seat at the World Championships, obtaining the gold medal.

In 2019 she rowed 2-seat in the women's eight, earning bronze at the World Championships.

She qualified to represent the United States at the 2020 Summer Olympics. At these Olympics, she rowed stroke seat in the women's eight, leading the USA to first place in the heat and thereby qualifying directly to the A final. The American boat finished in fourth place in the A final, 1.57 seconds behind third place China.
