= Charlotte Reinhardt =

German rower

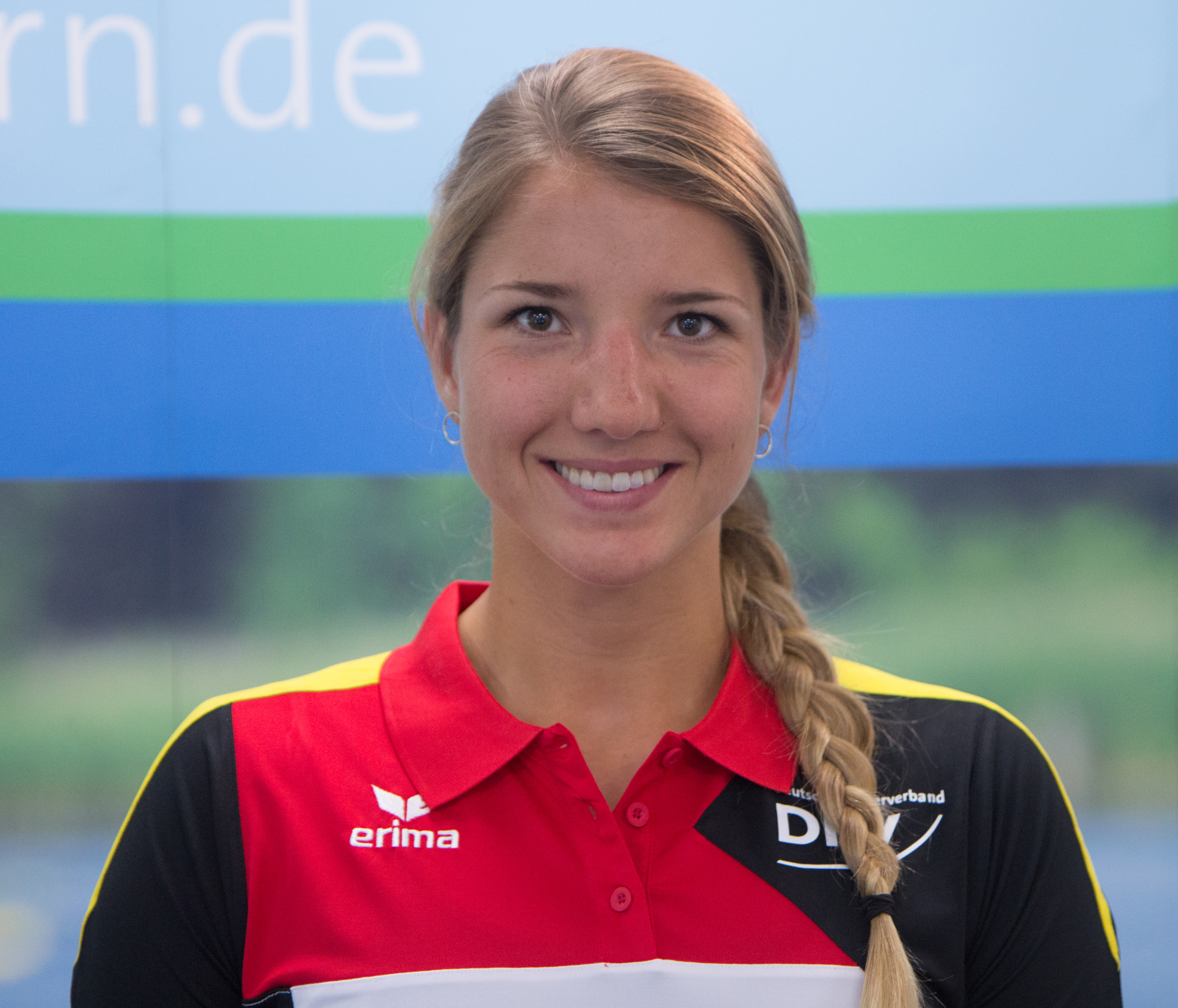

Personal information
- Born: 25 November 1993 (age 32) Dortmund, Germany
- Height: 186 cm (6 ft 1 in)

Sport
- Country: Germany
- Sport: Rowing
- Club: Dorsten Olympic Rowing Club
Medal record
Rowing
Representing Germany
World Championships
Bronze medal – third place	2016 Rotterdam	Women's coxless fours
World U23 Championships
Bronze medal – third place	2013 Linz Ottensheim	Women's eight
European Championships
Gold medal – first place	2017 Racice	Women's quadruple sculls
Bronze medal – third place	2014 Belgrade	Women's eight

Charlotte Reinhardt (born 25 November 1993) is a German rower who competes in international level events. She is a double World bronze medalist and a European champion, she competes in coxless four and eight.
