= Dana Moffat =

American rower (born 1997)

Personal information
- Nationality: American
- Born: April 30, 1997 (age 29)

Sport
- Country: United States
- Sport: Rowing
- Event: Eight
Medal record
World Championships
| Gold medal – first place | 2018 Plovdiv | Eight |
| Bronze medal – third place | 2019 Ottensheim | Eight |

Dana Moffat (born April 30, 1997) is an American rower.

Dana won a gold medal in the W8+ event at the 2018 World Rowing Championships and a bronze medal in the W8+ event at the 2019 World Rowing Championships.

Dana was a member of the USA Junior National Women's Rowing Team in 2014 where she and her women's 4- boat won a silver medal at the Junior World Rowing Championships in Hamburg, Germany. She made the team again in 2015 where her women's 4- boat won a gold medal at the Junior World Rowing championships in Rio de Janeiro, Brazil. She was also a member of the 2017 USA Under-23 National Women's Rowing team and earned a silver medal at the Under-23 World Rowing Championships in Plovdiv, Bulgaria.

Dana attended the University of California Berkeley 2015-2019 and was a valuable member of the Women's Varsity Rowing Team. She earned four varsity letters, two NCAA Championship gold medals, two Pac-12 Championship gold medals, and the title of Pac-12 Athlete of the year in 2019.

Dana and her team from Fayetteville-Manlius High School was a runner up on Season 8 in the local Central New York televised gameshow, Double Down, in 2013.
