= Christine Roper =

Canadian rower (born 1990)

Personal information
- Born: 15 May 1990 (age 36) Montego Bay, Jamaica
- Height: 188 cm (6 ft 2 in)
- Weight: 87 kg (192 lb)

Sport
- University team: Virginia Cavaliers
Medal record
Women's rowing
Representing Canada
Olympic Games
Gold medal – first place	2020 Tokyo	Eight
World Championships
Silver medal – second place	2013 Chungju	Coxless four
Silver medal – second place	2014 Amsterdam	Eight
Silver medal – second place	2017 Sarasota	Eight
Silver medal – second place	2018 Plovdiv	Eight
Bronze medal – third place	2013 Chungju	Eight
Bronze medal – third place	2015 Aiguebelette	Eight
World Rowing U23 Championships
Gold medal – first place	2011 Amsterdam	Eight
Gold medal – first place	2012 Trakai	Coxless four
Bronze medal – third place	2010 Belarus	Eight

Christine Faith Roper (born 15 May 1990) is a Canadian rower.

In June 2016, she was officially named to Canada's 2016 Olympic team as part of the women's eight, which finished in 5th place.

After the Rio Olympics, Roper went on to represent Canada at the 2017, 2018, and 2019 World Rowing Championships. Over the course of her rowing career, she has medalled over 20 times at World Rowing events.

She represented Canada at the 2020 Summer Olympics, where she won the gold medal in the women's eight, Canada's first in the event since 1992.

== Early life ==
Roper was born and raised in Jamaica. She migrated to the United States at the age of 14 to attend high school, where she was introduced to the sport of rowing. She graduated from Kent School in 2007. Roper moved to Canada after graduating from the University of Virginia in 2011 and began training with the national team.
