= Olivia Coffey =

American rower

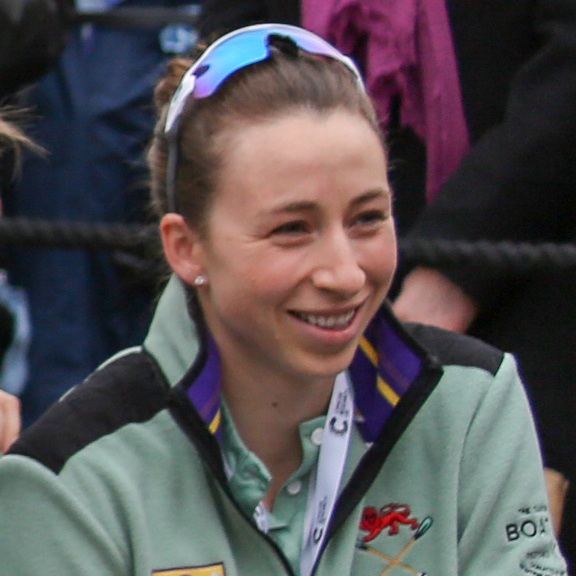
- Coffey before the 2018 Oxford vs Cambridge boat race

Personal information
- Nationality: American
- Born: January 29, 1989 (age 37) Elmira, New York, United States
- Height: 6 ft 1 in (185 cm)
- Weight: 170 lb (77 kg)

Sport
- Country: United States
- Sport: Rowing
- Events: Quad sculls, Coxless four, Eight

Achievements and titles
- Olympic finals: Tokyo 2020 W8+
Medal record
Women's rowing
Representing the United States
World Championships
Gold medal – first place	2013 Chungju	Coxless four
Gold medal – first place	2015 Aiguebelette	Quadruple sculls
Gold medal – first place	2018 Plovdiv	Eight
Bronze medal – third place	2014 Amsterdam	Quadruple sculls
Bronze medal – third place	2019 Ottensheim	Eight

Olivia Coffey (born January 29, 1989) is an American rower. She is a three-time world champion and an Olympian. She won the gold medal in the quad sculls at the 2015 World Rowing Championships. Coffey was in the winning Cambridge crew of The Boat Race 2018.

== Life ==
Coffey was born in 1989 in Elmira, New York. She first competed at rowing whilst at Phillips Academy in 2005. She was a member of the rowing team in her first year at Harvard University. She graduated in 2011. She took sixth in the 2016 rowing championship which qualified her to be the alternate in the US rowing team at the 2016 Olympics.

Coffey became a student at Cambridge University and was a member of the winning women's boat race in 2018.

She represented the United States at the 2020 Summer Olympics.
