= Willem-Alexander Baan =

Rowing venue in Zevenhuizen, Netherlands

Coordinates: 51°59′55″N 4°33′40″E

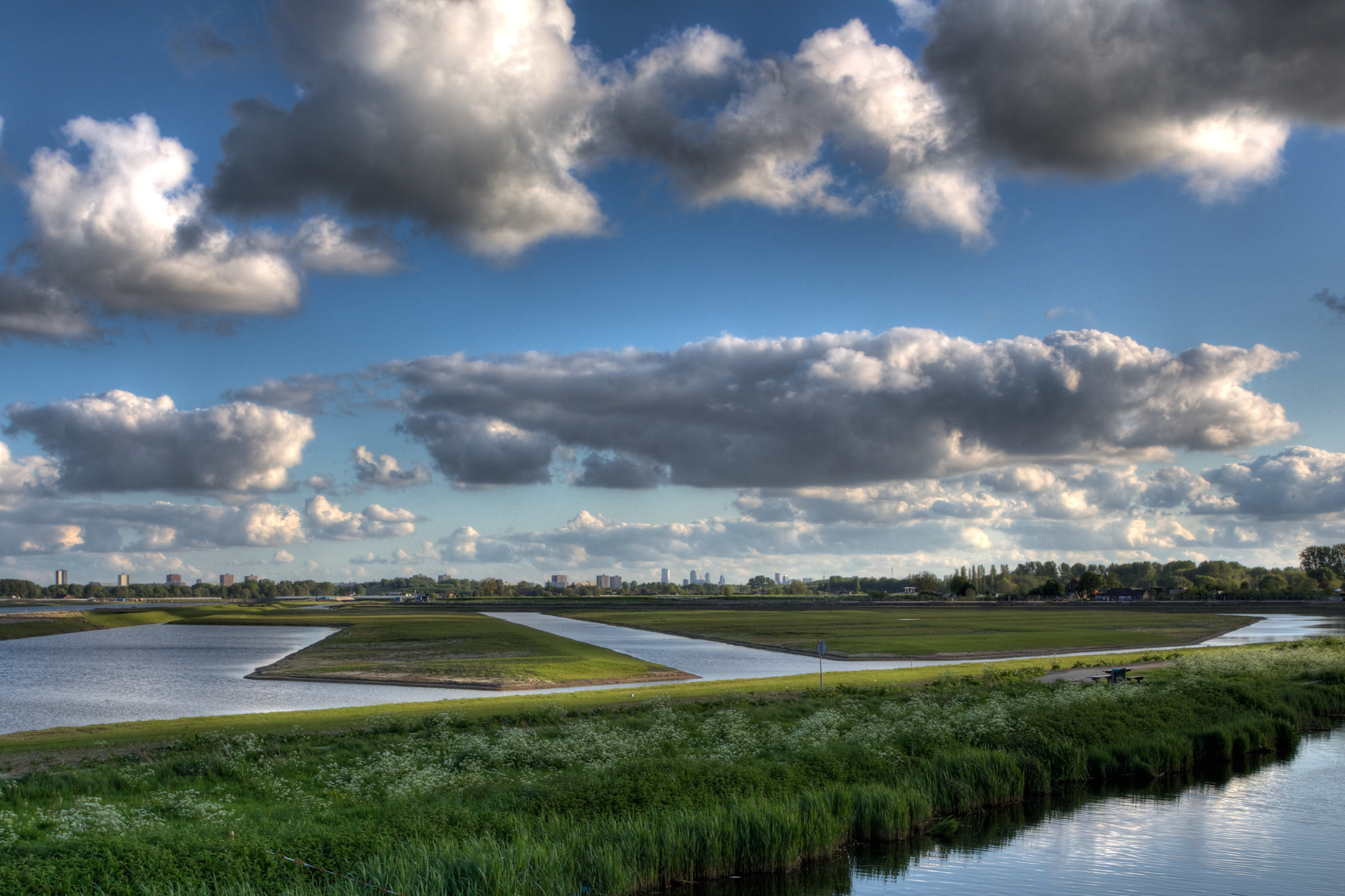
Willem-Alexander Baan under construction in 2012

Willem-Alexander Baan (Dutch for Willem-Alexander Rowing Course) is an artificial lake in the Dutch village of Zevenhuizen near Rotterdam. It has been used as a rowing regatta venue since 2012 and hosted the 2016 World Rowing Championships.

== History ==
Planning for the rowing lake started in 2002. Construction started in 2011 and was undertaken by the Government of Rotterdam, and the facility was opened by King Willem-Alexander on 26 April 2013.

The first competition was held in 2012, i.e. prior to the official opening of the facility. The first large competition that was held here was the rowing part of the European Universities Games 2014. In August 2016, the venue hosted the World Rowing Championships, the World Rowing U23 Championships, and the World Rowing Junior Championships.

== Description ==
Willem-Alexander Rowing Course is located parallel to the river Rotte. The competition area is laid out with eight lanes using the Albano buoy system. There is a second canal parallel to the competition area available for training runs and warm ups. The 2,000 metres (6,600 ft) course was designed in collaboration with the International Rowing Federation (FISA).
