= Gia Doonan =

American rower

Personal information
- Born: June 30, 1994 (age 32) Rochester, Massachusetts, U.S.
- Height: 6 ft 0 in (183 cm)
- Weight: 173 lb (78 kg)

Sport
- Country: United States
- Sport: Rowing
- Event: Eight

Achievements and titles
- Olympic finals: Tokyo 2020 W8+
Medal record
World Championships
Gold medal – first place	2018 Plovdiv	Eight
Bronze medal – third place	2019 Ottensheim	Eight

Gia Doonan (born June 30, 1994) is an American rower.

She attended Tabor Academy Harry Hoyle Award and the University of Texas. 3 Time 1st Team All-American--4 Time All-Big 12 Selection--2 Time Big 12 Rower of The Year--Jill Sterkel Leadership Award--NCAA Woman of the Year nominee--University of Texas Hall of Fame Inductee 2023

She won Gold at 2016 U23 World Rowing Championships. 4's and 8's. She won Gold at the 2018 World Rowing Championships. She won a medal at the 2019 World Rowing Championships.

She rowed in the United States women's eight at the 2020 Summer Olympics.
