= Katelin Guregian =

American rowing cox

Personal information
- Born: Katelin Snyder; August 16, 1987 (age 39) Nashua, New Hampshire, U.S.
- Height: 5 ft 4 in (163 cm)
- Weight: 110 lb (50 kg)
- Spouse: Nareg Guregian

Sport
- Country: United States
- Sport: Rowing
- Event: Eight
- College team: University of Washington
- Club: USRowing Training Center – Princeton
Medal record
Women's rowing
Representing the United States
Olympic Games
Gold medal – first place	2016 Rio de Janeiro	W8+ {{2020 Tokyo|W8+}}
World Championships
Gold medal – first place	2009 Poznań	W8+
Gold medal – first place	2013 Chungju	W8+
Gold medal – first place	2014 Amsterdam	W8+
Gold medal – first place	2015 Aiguebelette	W8+
Gold medal – first place	2018 Plovdiv	W8+
Gold medal – first place	2019 Long Beach	2019 USRowing Indoor Championships- Women’s Open Lightweight
Bronze medal – third place	2019 Ottensheim	W8+
U23 World Championships
Bronze medal – third place	2007 Glasgow	W8+
Gold medal – first place	2006 Hazewinkel	W8+

Katelin Guregian (née Snyder; August 16, 1987) is an American national rowing team coxswain. She is a five-time world champion and an Olympic gold medallist.

== Career ==
She attended Winter Park High School and rowed for Winter Park Crew.

She coxed the University of Washington men's eight in college to multiple victories, and has since moved on to the international level. She coxed the US Women's 8+ to a gold medal at the 2016 Summer Olympics. In 2013, Snyder coxed the U.S. Women's eight to a world record of 5:54.16 at the Rowing World Cup III in Lucerne, Switzerland.

She has qualified to represent the United States at the 2020 Summer Olympics.

== Competitive history ==
=== Senior ===
Year	Event	Women's 8+	Men's 8+
2013	World Rowing Cup III	1st place, gold medalist(s)	
2014	World Championships	1st place, gold medalist(s)	
2014	World Rowing Cup II	1st place, gold medalist(s)	
2015	World Championships	1st place, gold medalist(s)	
2015	World Rowing Cup II	1st place, gold medalist(s)	
2016	Olympic Games	1st place, gold medalist(s)	
2016	World Rowing Cup II	1st place, gold medalist(s)	
2017	World Championships	4th	

== Private life ==
Snyder met her future husband, Nareg Guregian, during the summer of 2013 at a training camp. They got engaged in 2015 and married towards the end of 2016. Snyder adopted dog Olly, December 22, 2018.
