= Felice Mueller =

American rower

Personal information
- Born: October 15, 1989 (age 37) Cleveland, Ohio, United States
- Height: 6 ft 0 in (183 cm)
- Weight: 161 lb (73 kg)

Sport
- Country: United States
- Sport: Rowing
- Events: Quadruple sculls, Coxless four, Eight
Medal record
Women's rowing
Representing the United States
World Championships
Gold medal – first place	2013 Chungju	Coxless four
Gold medal – first place	2018 Plovdiv	Eight
Bronze medal – third place	2014 Amsterdam	Quadruple sculls
Bronze medal – third place	2015 Aiguebelette	Coxless pair
Bronze medal – third place	2019 Ottensheim	Eight

Felice Mueller (born October 15, 1989) is an American rower. She won the gold medal in the coxless four at the 2013 World Rowing Championships. Her rowing career began at the Pomfret School. From there, she attended and rowed at the University of Michigan from 2008 to 2012. She won a bronze medal at the 2019 World Rowing Championships in the Women’s Eights.
