= Ella Greenslade =

New Zealand rower

Personal information
- Nationality: New Zealand
- Born: 8 April 1997 (age 29) Christchurch, New Zealand

Sport
- Country: New Zealand
- Sport: Rowing
- Event: Eight
Medal record
Women's rowing
Representing New Zealand
Olympic Games
Silver medal – second place	2020 Tokyo	Eight
World Championships
Gold medal – first place	2019 Ottensheim	Eight

Ella Greenslade (born 8 April 1997) is a New Zealand representative rower.

Greenslade is from Christchurch and was educated at St Margaret's College. She won a gold medal as a member of the women's eight team at the 2019 World Rowing Championships.
