= Ronja Schütte =

German rower

Personal information
- Nationality: German
- Born: 20 February 1990 (age 35); Geesthacht, West Germany

Sport
- Sport: Rowing

Ronja Schütte (born 20 February 1990) is a German rower. She competed in the women's eight event at the 2012 Summer Olympics.
