= Molly Bruggeman =

American rower

Personal information
- Nationality: American
- Born: June 19, 1992 (age 34) Dayton, Ohio, U.S.
- Height: 5 ft 11 in (180 cm)

Sport
- Country: United States
- Sport: Rowing
- Events: Coxless four; Eight
- College team: Notre Dame Fighting Irish (2010–2014)
Medal record
Women's rowing
Representing United States
World Championships
Gold medal – first place	2018 Plovdiv	Coxless four
Gold medal – first place	2026 Amsterdam	Coxless four
Silver medal – second place	2016 Rotterdam	Coxless four
Bronze medal – third place	2026 Amsterdam	Mixed eight
Pan American Games
Gold medal – first place	2015 Toronto	Coxless pair

Molly Bruggeman (/ˈbrʌɡəmən/ BRUG-ə-mən; born June 19, 1992) is an American rower. In the 2018 World Rowing Championships, she won a gold medal in the women's coxless four event. She also won a silver medal in the 2016 World Rowing Championships in the same event. During the 2024 Summer Olympics, she competed in the women's eight event.
