= Monica Lanz =

Dutch rower (born 1991)

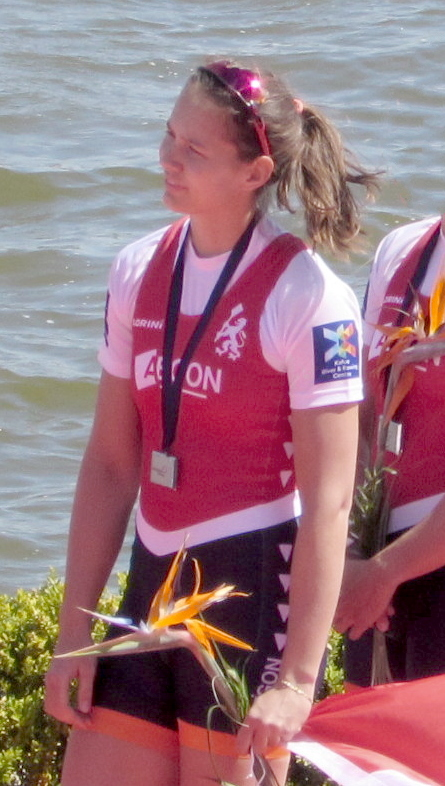
- Lanz at the 2016 European Championships

Personal information
- Born: 8 April 1991 (age 35)
- Height: 180 cm (5 ft 11 in)
- Weight: 70 kg (154 lb)

Sport
- Sport: Rowing
- Event: Eights
- Club: USR Triton
- Coached by: Josy Verdonkschot

Achievements and titles
- Olympic finals: 2016
Medal record
Women's rowing
Representing the Netherlands
European Championships
Silver medal – second place	2015 Poznań	Eights
Silver medal – second place	2016 Brandenburg	Eights

Monica Lanz (born 8 April 1991) is a Dutch rower who competes in the eights. She won silver medals at the 2015 and 2016 European Championships and placed sixth at the 2016 Rio Olympics.

Lanz took up rowing aged 12 with her sister and began competing in 2009. She has a degree in law from Utrecht University.
