= Holly Norton =

South African–British rower (born 1993)

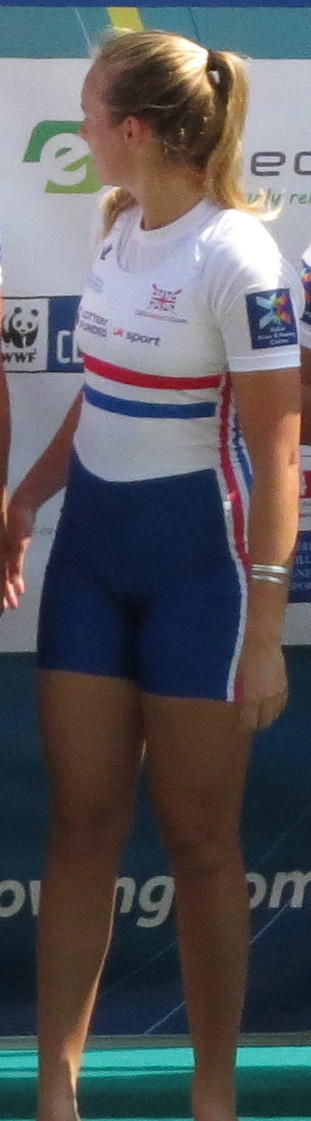
- Holly Norton

Personal information
- Born: 1 January 1993 (age 33) Harare, Zimbabwe
- Home town: Johannesburg, South Africa
- Education: BSc Psychology from Ohio State University
- Height: 6 ft 0 in (183 cm)

Sport
- Country: Great Britain
- College team: Ohio State Buckeyes
- Club: Leander
Medal record
Women's rowing
Representing Great Britain
World Championships
| Gold medal – first place | 2016 Rotterdam | Coxless four |
| Silver medal – second place | 2015 Aiguebelette | Coxless four |
European Championships
| Silver medal – second place | 2018 Glasgow | Eight |
| Silver medal – second place | 2019 Lucerne | Eight |
| Bronze medal – third place | 2017 Račice | Coxless pair |
Representing South Africa
World Junior Championships
| Silver medal – second place | 2011 Eton | Coxless pair |

Holly Norton (born 1 January 1993) is a South African–British rower.

== Biography ==
Born and raised in Harare, Zimbabwe, Holly's family moved to South Africa in 2003. It was at St Stithians Girl's College that she first took up rowing.

She was part of the British team that topped the medal table at the 2015 World Rowing Championships at Lac d'Aiguebelette in France, where she won a silver medal as part of the coxless four with Rebecca Chin, Karen Bennett and Lucinda Gooderham. She won the gold medal in the coxless four at the 2016 World Rowing Championships with Donna Etiebet, Holly Nixon and Fiona Gammond.

Norton formerly represented South Africa as a junior rower. She rowed collegiately for the Ohio State Buckeyes, and helped the team to three consecutive NCAA national championship titles in 2013, 2014 and 2015. She currently rows for the Leander Club.
