= Matilda Horn =

British rowing cox

Personal information
- Full name: Matilda Alice Horn
- Born: 16 August 1992 (age 33) London, England
- Height: 161 cm (5 ft 3 in)
Medal record
Women's rowing
Representing Great Britain
European Championships
Silver medal – second place	2018 Glasgow	Eight
Silver medal – second place	2019 Lucerne	Eight

Matilda Alice Horn (born 16 August 1992) is a British coxswain. She won a silver medal in the eight at the 2019 European Rowing Championships.
