= Aletta Jorritsma =

Dutch rower

Personal information
- Born: 17 May 1989 (age 37)
- Height: 1.86 m (6 ft 1 in)
- Weight: 76 kg (168 lb)

Sport
- Sport: Rowing

Aletta Jorritsma (born 17 May 1989) is a Dutch rower. She competed in the women's coxless pair event at the 2016 Summer Olympics.
