= Xu Fei =

Chinese rower

Personal information
- Nationality: Chinese
- Born: 17 September 1994 (age 31)

Sport
- Sport: Rowing
Medal record
Women's rowing
Representing China
Olympic Games
| Bronze medal – third place | 2020 Tokyo | Eight |

Xu Fei (born 17 September 1994) is a Chinese rower. She competed in the women's eight event at the 2020 Summer Olympics.
