= Huang Kaifeng =

Chinese rower

Personal information
- Nationality: China
- Born: 21 December 1997 (age 28) Xuzhou, China

Sport
- Sport: Rowing

Huang Kaifeng (Chinese: 黄开凤, born 21 December 1997) is a Chinese rower. She competed for China at the 2020 Summer Olympics, placing 13th in the women's coxless pair event with Liu Jinchao.
