= José van Veen =

Dutch rower (born 1986)

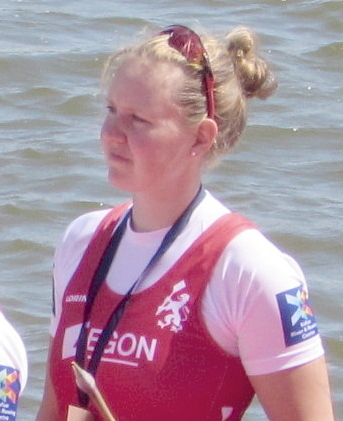
- Van Veen at the 2016 European Championships

Personal information
- Full name: José Agnes van Veen
- Born: 9 January 1986 (age 40)
- Education: The Hague University of Applied Sciences
- Height: 195 cm (6 ft 5 in)
- Weight: 87 kg (192 lb)

Sport
- Sport: Rowing
- Event: Eights
- Club: RV De Laak
- Coached by: Josy Verdonkschot

Achievements and titles
- Olympic finals: 2016
Medal record
Women's rowing
Representing the Netherlands
European Championships
Silver medal – second place	2016 Brandenburg	Eights
Silver medal – second place	2017 Račice	Eights
Bronze medal – third place	2018 Glasgow	Eights

José Agnes van Veen (born 9 January 1986) is a Dutch rower who competes in the eights. She won a silver medal at the 2016 European Championships and placed sixth at the 2016 Rio Olympics.
