= Karen Bennett (rower) =

British rower (born 1989)

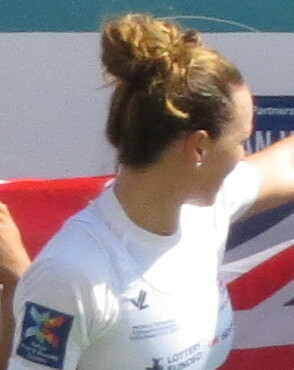
- Bennett at the 2015 World Championships

Personal information
- Born: 5 February 1989 (age 37) Perth, Scotland
- Home town: Edinburgh, Scotland
- Height: 179 cm (5 ft 10 in)
- Weight: 75 kg (165 lb)

Sport
- Club: Leander Club
Medal record
Women's rowing
Representing Great Britain
Olympic Games
| Silver medal – second place | 2016 Rio de Janeiro | Eight |
World Championships
| Silver medal – second place | 2015 Aiguebelette | Coxless four |
European Championships
| Gold medal – first place | 2016 Brandenburg | Eight |
| Bronze medal – third place | 2017 Račice | Coxless pair |
| Silver medal – second place | 2018 Glasgow | Eight |
| Silver medal – second place | 2019 Lucerne | Eight |
| Silver medal – second place | 2023 Bled | Eight |
| Bronze medal – third place | 2021 Varese | Coxless four |

Karen Bennett (born 5 February 1989) is a British rower who competed both the 2016 Summer Olympics and 2020 Summer Olympics.

== Rowing career ==
Bennett's hometown is Edinburgh in Scotland. In Edinburgh, she rows for the Leander Club. She was a member of the Scotland Team at the 2014 Commonwealth Rowing Championships.

She was part of the British team that topped the medal table at the 2015 World Rowing Championships at Lac d'Aiguebelette in France, where she won a silver medal as part of the coxless four with Rebecca Chin, Lucinda Gooderham and Holly Norton.

She won a silver medal in the women's eight at the 2016 Olympic Games.

In 2021, she won a European bronze medal in the coxless four in Varese, Italy.
