= Qin Miaomiao =

Chinese rower

Personal information
- Nationality: Chinese
- Born: 11 December 1996 (age 28)

Sport
- Sport: Rowing

Qin Miaomiao (born 11 December 1996) is a Chinese rower. She competed in the women's coxless four event at the 2020 Summer Olympics.
