= Emily Regan =

American rower (born 1988)

Personal information
- Born: June 10, 1988 (age 38) Buffalo, New York, United States
- Height: 6 ft 2 in (188 cm)
- Weight: 179 lb (81 kg)

Sport
- Country: United States
- Sport: Rowing
- Event(s): Coxless four, Eight
Medal record
Women's rowing
Representing the United States
Olympic Games
Gold medal – first place	2016 Rio de Janeiro	Eight
World Championships
Gold medal – first place	2011 Bled	Coxless four
Gold medal – first place	2013 Chungju	Eight
Gold medal – first place	2015 Aiguebelette	Eight
Gold medal – first place	2018 Plovdiv	Eight
Silver medal – second place	2014 Amsterdam	Coxless four
Bronze medal – third place	2019 Ottensheim	Eight

Emily Regan (born June 10, 1988) is an American rower. She is a four-time gold medalist at the World Rowing Championships and she won Olympic Gold in the Women's eight in 2016. She won a medal at the 2019 World Rowing Championships.
