= Fiona Gammond =

British rower

Personal information
- Full name: Fiona Catherine Gammond
- Born: 19 October 1992 (age 34) Bicester, England, U.K.
- Height: 182 cm (6 ft 0 in)

Sport
- Country: Great Britain
- Club: Leander Club
Medal record
Women's rowing
Representing Great Britain
World Championships
Gold medal – first place	2016 Rotterdam	Coxless four
European Championships
Silver medal – second place	2018 Glasgow	Eight
Silver medal – second place	2019 Lucerne	Eight

Fiona Catherine Gammond (born 19 October 1992) is a British rower. In the 2016 World Rowing Championships, she won a gold medal in the women's coxless four event with Donna Etiebet, Holly Nixon and Holly Norton.
